= 2016–17 Scottish League Cup group stage =

2016–17 Scottish League Cup (group stage)
Tournament details
- Country: Scotland
- Dates: 15 July 2016 – 31 July 2016
- Teams: 40

Tournament statistics
- Matches played: 64
- Goals scored: 244 (3.81 per match)
- Top goal scorer(s): Brian Graham; Greg Stewart (6 goals)

The 2016–17 Scottish League Cup group stage was played from 15 July to 31 July 2016. A total of 40 teams competed in the group stage. The winners of each of the 8 groups, as well as the 4 best runners-up progressed to the second round (last 16) of the 2016–17 Scottish League Cup.

== Format ==
The group stage is made up of 9 teams from the 2015–16 Scottish Premiership, 9 from the 2015–16 Scottish Championship, 10 from each of the 2015–16 Scottish League One and 2015–16 Scottish League Two, as well as the winners of the 2015–16 Highland Football League and 2015–16 Lowland Football League, and will see these 40 teams divided into two sections: 4 groups of 20 teams from the North section and 4 groups of 20 teams from the South sections. Each section comprises four top seeded teams, four second seeded teams and 12 unseeded teams, with each group being made up of 1 top seed, 1 second seed and 3 unseeded sides. The draw for the group stages took place on 27 May 2016 at 7:30pm BST at the BT Sport Studio in London and was shown live on BT Sport Europe.

== Teams ==
Teams in Bold qualified for the second round

=== Seeding ===
==== North ====
Top seeds	Second seeds	Unseeded
01. **St Johnstone**; 02. Ross County; 03. **Inverness CT**; 04. Dundee	09. **Dundee United**; 10. Falkirk; 11. Raith Rovers; 12. Dumbarton	17. Dunfermline Athletic; 18. **Alloa Athletic**; 19. **Peterhead**; 20. Brechin City; 21. East Fife; 22. Cowdenbeath; 23. Forfar Athletic; 24. Elgin City; 25. Stirling Albion; 26. Arbroath; 27. Montrose; 28. Cove Rangers

==== South ====
Top seeds	Second seeds	Unseeded
05. **Motherwell**; 06. **Partick Thistle**; 07. **Hamilton Academical**; 08. Kilmarnock	13. **Rangers**; 14. **Greenock Morton**; 15. St Mirren; 16. **Queen of the South**	29. **Ayr United**; 30. Livingston; 31. Stranraer; 32. Airdrieonians; 33. Albion Rovers; 34. Stenhousemuir; 35. Queen's Park; 36. Clyde; 37. Annan Athletic; 38. Berwick Rangers; 39. Edinburgh City; 40. East Stirlingshire

== North ==
All times are BST (UTC+1).

=== Group A ===
Pos	Team	Pld	W	PW	PL	L	GF	GA	GD	Pts	Qualification	PET	EFI	DND	FOR	DUM
1	Peterhead (Q)	4	2	1	0	1	8	6	+2	**8**	Qualification for the Second Round	—	—	2–1	2–0	—
2	East Fife	4	2	1	0	1	5	4	+1	**8**		2–1	—	p1–1	—	—
3	Dundee	4	2	0	1	1	15	5	+10	**7**		—	—	—	7–0	6–2
4	Forfar Athletic	4	1	1	0	2	4	11	−7	**5**		—	2–0	—	—	p2–2
5	Dumbarton	4	0	0	2	2	7	13	−6	**2**		3–3p	0–2	—	—	—

Source: SPFL
(Q) Qualified to the phase indicated

==== Matches ====
16 July 2016
15:00

East Fife	1–1	Dundee
Smith 78'	SPFL Report	Hemmings 36'
Penalties
Mercer (penalty scored); McManus (penalty missed); Duggan (penalty scored); Lamont (penalty scored); Robinson (penalty scored)	4–2	(penalty scored) Hemmings; (penalty missed) Loy; (penalty missed) Vincent; (penalty scored) Williams

Bayview Stadium, Methil
Attendance: 1,407
Referee: Barry Cook
16 July 2016
15:00

Forfar Athletic	2–2	Dumbarton
Peters 36'; O'Brien 62'	SPFL Report	Gallagher 54'; Fleming 69' (pen.)
Penalties
Cox (penalty scored); Milne (penalty scored); Lister (penalty scored); Munro (penalty scored); Swankie (penalty scored)	5–3	(penalty scored) Thomson; (penalty missed) Gallagher; (penalty scored) Fleming; (penalty scored) Stevenson

Station Park, Forfar
Attendance: 426
Referee: David Lowe
19 July 2016
19:45

Dumbarton	0–2	East Fife
	SPFL Report	Smith 19'; McManus 39'

Dumbarton Football Stadium, Dumbarton
Attendance: 452
Referee: Craig Charleston
19 July 2016
20:00

Peterhead	2–0	Forfar Athletic
Munro 20' (o.g.); McAllister 34' (pen.)	SPFL Report

Balmoor Stadium, Peterhead
Attendance: 508
Referee: Gavin Ross
23 July 2016
15:00

Dundee	6–2	Dumbarton
Stewart 16', 74', 80'; Hemmings 48', 85'; O'Dea 73'	SPFL Report	Wright 26'; Buchanan 33'

Dens Park, Dundee
Attendance: 2,319
Referee: Kevin Clancy
23 July 2016
15:00

East Fife	2–1	Peterhead
Page 38'; McManus 50' (pen.)	SPFL Report	Brown 26'

Bayview Stadium, Methil
Attendance: 532
Referee: Kevin Graham
26 July 2016
19:45

Forfar Athletic	2–0	East Fife
Lister 20'; Munro 50'	SPFL Report

Station Park, Forfar
Attendance: 565
Referee: Mat Northcroft
26 July 2016
20:00

Peterhead	2–1	Dundee
McAllister 62', 88' (pen.)	SPFL Report	Stewart 90'

Balmoor Stadium, Peterhead
Attendance: 998
Referee: Nick Walsh
30 July 2016
15:00

Dumbarton	3–3	Peterhead
Thomson 21'; D. Smith 36'; Stevenson 48' (pen.)	SPFL Report	Dzierzawski 16'; McIntosh 57'; McAllister 69' (pen.)
Penalties
Thomson (penalty missed); McCallum (penalty missed); D. Smith (penalty missed); Todd (penalty scored); Stevenson (penalty scored); Docherty (penalty scored); Buchanan (penalty scored); Kassaraté (penalty missed); Stirling (penalty scored); Pettigrew (penalty missed)	5–6	(penalty scored) McAllister; (penalty scored) Stevenson; (penalty missed) Strachan; (penalty missed) Brown; (penalty missed) Kelleher; (penalty scored) Dzierzawski; (penalty scored) Blockley; (penalty missed) G. Smith; (penalty scored) Noble; (penalty scored) Riley

Dumbarton Stadium, Dumbarton
Attendance: 305
Referee: Alan Muir
30 July 2016
15:00

Dundee	7–0	Forfar Athletic
McGowan 18'; Duffy 34'; Stewart 39', 64'; Etxabeguren 55'; Loy 72'; Teijsse 88'	SPFL Report

Dens Park, Dundee
Attendance: 2,219
Referee: Willie Collum

=== Group B ===
Pos	Team	Pld	W	PW	PL	L	GF	GA	GD	Pts	Qualification	STJ	FAL	STI	BRE	ELG
1	St Johnstone (Q)	4	3	0	1	0	11	2	+9	**10**	Qualification for the Second Round	—	3–0	4–0	—	—
2	Falkirk	4	2	0	0	2	5	4	+1	**6**		—	—	—	2–0	3–0
3	Stirling Albion	4	2	0	0	2	6	7	−1	**6**		—	1–0	—	—	4–1
4	Brechin City	4	1	1	0	2	5	8	−3	**5**		p1–1	—	2–1	—	—
5	Elgin City	4	1	0	0	3	6	12	−6	**3**		1–3	—	—	4–2	—

Source: SPFL
(Q) Qualified to the phase indicated

==== Matches ====
16 July 2016
15:00

Elgin City	1–3	St Johnstone
Duff 48'	BBC Report; SPFL Report	Swanson 16'; Cummins 71'; MacLean 79'

Borough Briggs, Elgin
Attendance: 1,046
Referee: Alan Muir
16 July 2016
15:00

Stirling Albion	1–0	Falkirk
Smith 41'	BBC Report; SPFL Report

Forthbank Stadium, Stirling
Attendance: 1,315
Referee: Colin Steven
19 July 2016
19:45

Brechin City	2–1	Stirling Albion
Love 14'; Trouten 87'	SPFL Report	Henderson 38' (pen.)

Glebe Park, Brechin
Attendance: 362
Referee: Graham Beaton
19 July 2016
19:45

Falkirk	3–0	Elgin City
Vaulks 28'; Miller 36'; McHugh 88'	SPFL Report

Falkirk Stadium, Falkirk
Attendance: 1,278
Referee: Kevin Graham
23 July 2016
15:00

Elgin City	4–2	Brechin City
Gunn 11', 45+2' (pen.); Moore 61'; McHardy 66'	SPFL Report	Dyer 30'; Trouten 68' (pen.)

Borough Briggs, Elgin
Attendance: 506
Referee: Craig Naiper
23 July 2016
15:00

St Johnstone	3–0	Falkirk
Swanson 25' (pen.), 38' (pen.); MacLean 68'	SPFL Report

McDiarmid Park, Perth
Attendance: 2,725
Referee: Bobby Madden
26 July 2016
19:45

Brechin City	1–1	St Johnstone
Jackson 35'	SPFL Report	Kane 86'
Penalties
Hill (penalty scored); Dyer (penalty scored); Graham (penalty missed); Trouten (penalty scored); Love (penalty scored)	4–2	(penalty scored) Swanson; (penalty missed) Kane; (penalty scored) Cummins; (penalty missed) Coulson

Glebe Park, Brechin
Attendance: 912
Referee: John McKendrick
26 July 2016
19:45

Stirling Albion	4–1	Elgin City
Ferns 11'; Henderson 48', 71', 74' (pen.)	SPFL Report	McLeod 12'

Forthbank Stadium, Stirling
Attendance: 522
Referee: Scott Millar
30 July 2016
15:00

Falkirk	2–0	Brechin City
Gasparotto 50'; Austin 53'	SPFL Report

Falkirk Stadium, Falkirk
Attendance: 1,073
Referee: Steven McLean
30 July 2016
15:00

St Johnstone	4–0	Stirling Albion
Anderson 4'; MacLean 33'; Craig 43'; Wotherspoon 90+2'	SPFL Report

McDiarmid Park, Perth
Attendance: 2,858
Referee: Barry Cook

=== Group C ===
Pos	Team	Pld	W	PW	PL	L	GF	GA	GD	Pts	Qualification	ICT	DUN	DNF	COW	ARB
1	Inverness CT (Q)	4	3	0	1	0	15	3	+12	**10**	Qualification for the Second Round	—	1–1p	—	—	7–0
2	Dundee United (Q)	4	2	2	0	0	10	3	+7	**10**	Qualification for the Second Round	—	—	2–0	6–1	—
3	Dunfermline Athletic	4	2	0	0	2	7	7	0	**6**		1–5	—	—	—	3–0
4	Cowdenbeath	4	1	0	0	3	4	11	−7	**3**		1–2	—	0–3	—	—
5	Arbroath	4	0	0	1	3	1	13	−12	**1**		—	1–1p	—	0–2	—

Source: SPFL
(Q) Qualified to the phase indicated

==== Matches ====
15 July 2016
19:45

Arbroath	1–1	Dundee United
Hamilton 90+2'	BBC Report; SPFL Report	Anier 85'
Penalties
Doris (penalty scored); Whatley (penalty scored); Callaghan (penalty missed); Hamilton (penalty scored)	3–5	(penalty scored) Telfer; (penalty scored) Donaldson; (penalty scored) Dixon; (penalty scored) Souttar; (penalty scored) Fraser

Gayfield Park, Arbroath
Attendance: 3,124
Referee: Don Robertson
16 July 2016
15:00

Cowdenbeath	1–2	Inverness CT
Brett 23'	BBC Report; SPFL Report	Draper 13'; Warren 74'

Central Park, Cowdenbeath
Attendance: 487
Referee: Stephen Finnie
19 July 2016
19:45

Dundee United	6–1	Cowdenbeath
Murray 4', 32', 72'; Toshney 9'; Smith 21'; Anier 88'	SPFL Report	Turner 25'

Tannadice Park, Dundee
Attendance: 3,360
Referee: Crawford Allan
19 July 2016
19:45

Dunfermline Athletic	3–0	Arbroath
Moffat 44', 66'; Geggan 62'	SPFL Report

East End Park, Dunfermline
Attendance: 1,974
Referee: David Munro
23 July 2016
15:00

Cowdenbeath	0–3	Dunfermline Athletic
	SPFL Report	Geggan 57', 85'; Ashcroft 68'

Central Park, Cowdenbeath
Attendance: 1,481
Referee: Colin Steven
23 July 2016
15:00

Inverness CT	1–1	Dundee United
Boden 35'	SPFL Report	Murdoch 45'
Penalties
Tremarco (penalty scored); Tansey (penalty missed); Draper (penalty missed)	1–4	(penalty scored) Obadeyi; (penalty scored) Donaldson; (penalty scored) Murdoch; (penalty scored) Murray

Caledonian Stadium, Inverness
Attendance: 1,839
Referee: Euan Anderson
26 July 2016
19:45

Dunfermline Athletic	1–5	Inverness CT
Geggan 28'	SPFL Report	Vigurs 16', 42', 66'; King 54'; Tremarco 89'

East End Park, Dunfermline
Attendance: 2,580
Referee: Crawford Allan
27 July 2016
19:45

Arbroath	0–2	Cowdenbeath
	SPFL Report	Johnston 14'; Todorov 42'

Gayfield Park, Arbroath
Attendance: 421
Referee: Mike Roncone
30 July 2016
15:00

Inverness CT	7–0	Arbroath
King 10': Boden 18', 25', 71'; Tremarco 37', 87'; Vigurs 46'	SPFL Report

Caledonian Stadium, Inverness
Attendance: 1,316
Referee: Greg Aitken
31 July 2016
15:00

Dundee United	2–0	Dunfermline Athletic
Murray 49'; Fraser 83'	SPFL Report

Tannadice Park, Dundee
Attendance: 4,951
Referee: John McKendrick

=== Group D ===
Pos	Team	Pld	W	PW	PL	L	GF	GA	GD	Pts	Qualification	ALL	RAI	ROS	COV	MON
1	Alloa Athletic (Q)	4	4	0	0	0	10	2	+8	**12**	Qualification for the Second Round	—	—	3–2	4–0	—
2	Raith Rovers	4	2	1	0	1	5	4	+1	**8**		0–1	—	—	—	2–1
3	Ross County	4	2	0	1	1	11	4	+7	**7**		—	1–1p	—	7–0	—
4	Cove Rangers	4	1	0	0	3	4	13	−9	**3**		—	1–2	—	—	3–0
5	Montrose	4	0	0	0	4	1	8	−7	**0**		0–2	—	0–1	—	—

Source: SPFL
(Q) Qualified to the phase indicated

==== Matches ====
15 July 2016
19:45

Cove Rangers	1–2	Raith Rovers
Stott 32'	SPFL Report	Benedictus 36'; Vaughan 56'

Station Park, Forfar
Attendance: 362
Referee: Graham Beaton
16 July 2016
15:00

Montrose	0–1	Ross County
	SPFL Report	Graham 86' (pen.)

Links Park, Montrose
Attendance: 557
Referee: Craig Charleston
19 July 2016
19:30

Alloa Athletic	4–0	Cove Rangers
Spence 23'; Graham 51'; Kirkpatrick 64'; Layne 83'	SPFL Report

Recreation Park, Alloa
Attendance: 213
Referee: Steven Reid
19 July 2016
19:45

Raith Rovers	2–1	Montrose
Johnston 12'; Vaughan 87' (pen.)	SPFL Report	Bolochoweckyj 58'

Stark's Park, Kirkcaldy
Attendance: 1,147
Referee: Colin Steven
23 July 2016
15:00

Montrose	0–2	Alloa Athletic
	SPFL Report	Spence 33'; Layne 50'

Links Park, Montrose
Attendance: 358
Referee: Grant Irvine
23 July 2016
15:00

Ross County	1–1	Raith Rovers
Graham 75' (pen.)	SPFL Report	Čikoš 18' (o.g.)
Penalties
Schalk (penalty scored); Graham (penalty scored); Gardyne (penalty missed); Routis (penalty scored); McEveley (penalty missed); McShane (penalty missed)	3–4	(penalty scored) Benedictus; (penalty scored) Stewart; (penalty missed) Callachan; (penalty missed) Thomson; (penalty scored) McManus; (penalty scored) McHattie

Victoria Park, Dingwall
Referee: John McKendrick
26 July 2016
19:30

Alloa Athletic	3–2	Ross County
Kirkpatrick 2'; Robertson 11'; Waters 72'	SPFL Report	Graham 14'; Schalk 21'

Recreation Park, Alloa
Attendance: 319
Referee: Stephen Finnie
27 July 2016
19:45

Cove Rangers	3–0	Montrose
Walker 14'; Megginson 59'; Park 78'	SPFL Report

Station Park, Forfar
Attendance: 189
Referee: Mike Taylor
30 July 2016
15:00

Raith Rovers	0–1	Alloa Athletic
	SPFL Report	Spence 34'

Stark's Park, Kirkcaldy
Attendance: 1,674
Referee: Kevin Clancy
30 July 2016
15:00

Ross County	7–0	Cove Rangers
Schalk 24', 49'; Graham 46', 56', 89'; Curran 65', 81'	SPFL Report

Victoria Park, Dingwall
Attendance: 722
Referee: Mat Northcroft

== South ==
All times are BST (UTC+1).

=== Group E ===
Pos	Team	Pld	W	PW	PL	L	GF	GA	GD	Pts	Qualification	PAR	QOS	AIR	QPA	STE
1	Partick Thistle (Q)	4	4	0	0	0	9	2	+7	**12**	Qualification for the Second Round	—	2–1	—	2–0	—
2	Queen of the South (Q)	4	3	0	0	1	6	2	+4	**9**	Qualification for the Second Round	—	—	2–0	—	1–0
3	Airdrieonians	4	1	1	0	2	5	7	−2	**5**		0–1	—	—	—	2–1
4	Queen's Park	4	1	0	1	2	5	7	−2	**4**		—	0–2	p3–3	—	—
5	Stenhousemuir	4	0	0	0	4	2	9	−7	**0**		1–4	—	—	0–2	—

Source: SPFL
(Q) Qualified to the phase indicated

==== Matches ====
15 July 2016
19:30

Airdrieonians	0–1	Partick Thistle
	SPFL Report	Doolan 55'

Excelsior Stadium, Airdrie
Attendance: 1,632
Referee: Kevin Clancy
16 July 2016
15:00

Queen's Park	0–2	Queen of the South
	SPFL Report	Pickard 29'; Dowie 34'

Excelsior Stadium, Airdrie
Attendance: 410
Referee: Alan Newlands
19 July 2016
19:45

Queen of the South	2–0	Airdrieonians
Lyle 9', 24'	SPFL Report

Palmerston Park, Dumfries
Attendance: 1,036
Referee: Nick Walsh
19 July 2016
19:45

Stenhousemuir	0–2	Queen's Park
	SPFL Report	Burns 40': >McVey 81'

Ochilview Park, Stenhousemuir
Attendance: 273
Referee: Craig Napier
23 July 2016
15:00

Airdrieonians	2–1	Stenhousemuir
Brown 13', 67'	SPFL Report	Gilhaney 56'

Excelsior Stadium, Airdrie
Attendance: 532
Referee: Gavin Duncan
23 July 2016
15:00

Partick Thistle	2–1	Queen of the South
Erskine 82'; Lawless 90'	SPFL Report	Hilson 48'

Firhill Stadium, Glasgow
Attendance: 2,358
Referee: Alan Muir
26 July 2016
19:30

Queen's Park	3–3	Airdrieonians
Cummins 3'; Malone 48'; Burns 79'	SPFL Report	Ryan 19': Brown 20'; Russell 31'
Penalties
Miller (penalty scored); Millen (penalty scored); Burns (penalty scored); Woods (penalty missed); McGeever (penalty scored); Cummins (penalty scored); Gibson (penalty scored); MacPherson (penalty scored); McVey (penalty missed)	7–8	(penalty scored) Fitzpatrick; (penalty scored) Russell; (penalty missed) Brown; (penalty scored) McLaughlin; (penalty scored) Higgins; (penalty scored) Schmidt; (penalty scored) Truesdale; (penalty scored) Stewart; (penalty scored) McIntosh

Hampden Park, Glasgow
Attendance: 553
Referee: David Munro
26 July 2016

Stenhousemuir	1–4	Partick Thistle
McCroary 73'	SPFL Report	Pogba 20'; Welsh 22' (pen.); Amoo 85'; Azeez 86'

Ochilview Park, Stenhousemuir
Attendance: 1,433
Referee: Don Robertson
30 July 2016
15:00

Partick Thistle	2–0	Queen's Park
Erskine 6'; Lindsay 78'	SPFL Report

Firhill Stadium, Glasgow
Attendance: 2,250
Referee: Andrew Dallas
30 July 2016
15:00

Queen of the South	1–0	Stenhousemuir
Hamill 78'	SPFL Report

Palmerston Park, Dumfries
Attendance: 1,013
Referee: Kevin Graham

=== Group F ===
Pos	Team	Pld	W	PW	PL	L	GF	GA	GD	Pts	Qualification	RAN	MOT	STR	ANN	EST
1	Rangers (Q)	4	4	0	0	0	10	0	+10	**12**	Qualification for the Second Round	—	—	3–0	2–0	—
2	Motherwell (Q)	4	3	0	0	1	9	3	+6	**9**	Qualification for the Second Round	0–2	—	—	—	3–0
3	Stranraer	4	2	0	0	2	5	8	−3	**6**		—	0–3	—	—	3–1
4	Annan Athletic	4	1	0	0	3	4	7	−3	**3**		—	1–3	1–2	—	—
5	East Stirlingshire	4	0	0	0	4	1	11	−10	**0**		0–3	—	—	0–2	—

Source: SPFL
(Q) Qualified to the phase indicated

==== Matches ====
16 July 2016
15:00

Annan Athletic	1–2	Stranraer
Dachnowicz 87'	SPFL Report	Nadé 59'; McKeown 76'

Galabank, Annan
Attendance: 418
Referee: Steven Reid
16 July 2016
15:00

Motherwell	0–2	Rangers
	SPFL Report	Tavernier 48'; Waghorn 90+1'

Fir Park, Motherwell
Attendance: 6,951
Referee: Steven McLean
19 July 2016
19:45

Rangers	2–0	Annan Athletic
McKay 30'; Waghorn 74'	SPFL Report

Ibrox Stadium, Glasgow
Attendance: 31,628
Referee: Euan Anderson
19 July 2016
19:45

Stranraer	3–1	East Stirlingshire
Malcolm 64'; McKeown 90+1'; Turner 90+4'	SPFL Report	Glasgow 60'

Stair Park, Stranraer
Attendance: 373
Referee: David Lowe
22 July 2016
19:45

East Stirlingshire	0–3	Rangers
	SPFL Report	Halliday 10' (pen.); Windass 35'; Dodoo 90+1'

Ochilview Park, Stenhousemuir
Attendance: 2,246
Referee: Crawford Allan
23 July 2016
15:00

Annan Athletic	1–3	Motherwell
Omar 44'	SPFL Report	Johnson 16'; Moult 61', 63'

Galabank, Annan
Attendance: 956
Referee: Nick Walsh
25 July 2016
19:45

Rangers	3–0	Stranraer
Waghorn 5' (pen.), 16'; Kranjčar 53'	SPFL Report

Ibrox Stadium, Glasgow
Attendance: 29,575
Referee: John Beaton
26 July 2016
19:45

Motherwell	3–0	East Stirlingshire
Johnson 53'; McDonald 76'; Cadden 87'	SPFL Report

Fir Park, Motherwell
Attendance: 2,503
Referee: Craig Charleston
30 July 2016
15:00

East Stirlingshire	0–2	Annan Athletic
	SPFL Report	Finnie 56'; Wright 90+2' (pen.)

Ochilview Park, Stenhousemuir
Attendance: 134
Referee: Mike Roncone
30 July 2016
15:00

Stranraer	0–3	Motherwell
	SPFL Report	Cadden 51'; Johnson 84'; McDonald 86'

Stair Park, Stranraer
Attendance: 953
Referee: Don Robertson

=== Group G ===
Pos	Team	Pld	W	PW	PL	L	GF	GA	GD	Pts	Qualification	HAM	AYR	STM	LIV	EDI
1	Hamilton Academical (Q)	4	3	0	0	1	10	5	+5	**9**	Qualification for the Second Round	—	—	3–0	2–1	—
2	Ayr United (Q)	4	3	0	0	1	5	2	+3	**9**	Qualification for the Second Round	2–1	—	—	—	1–0
3	St Mirren	4	3	0	0	1	7	5	+2	**9**		—	1–0	—	—	3–0
4	Livingston	4	1	0	0	3	6	7	−1	**3**		—	0–2	2–3	—	—
5	Edinburgh City	4	0	0	0	4	2	11	−9	**0**		2–4	—	—	0–3	—

Source: SPFL
(Q) Qualified to the phase indicated

==== Matches ====
16 July 2016
15:00

Ayr United	2–1	Hamilton Academical
Forrest 2' (pen.); Crawford 49'	SPFL Report	Longridge 90+4'

Somerset Park, Ayr
Attendance: 994
Referee: Willie Collum
16 July 2016
15:00

Livingston	2–3	St Mirren
Cadden 50'; Carrick 68'	SPFL Report	Clarkson 13', 81'; Morgan 74'

Almondvale Stadium, Livingston
Attendance: 894
Referee: Gavin Duncan
19 July 2016
19:45

St Mirren	1–0	Ayr United
Baird 90+3'	SPFL Report

St Mirren Park, Paisley
Attendance: 2,098
Referee: John Beaton
20 July 2016
19:45

Edinburgh City	0–3	Livingston
	SPFL Report	J. Mullin 27'; D. Mullen 45+2'; Buchanan 76'

Meadowbank Stadium, Edinburgh
Attendance: 525
Referee: Alan Newlands
23 July 2016
15:00

Ayr United	1–0	Edinburgh City
Gilmour 11'	SPFL Report

Somerset Park, Ayr
Attendance: 862
Referee: Barry Cook
23 July 2016
15:00

Hamilton Academical	3–0	St Mirren
Crawford 13'; Imrie 51'; Donati 70'	SPFL Report

New Douglas Park, Hamilton
Attendance: 1,379
Referee: Don Robertson
26 July 2016
19:45

Livingston	0–2	Ayr United
	SPFL Report	Murphy 19'; McGuffie 78'

Almondvale Stadium, Livingston
Attendance: 643
Referee: David Lowe
27 July 2016
19:45

Edinburgh City	2–4	Hamilton Academical
Allum 17', 19'	SPFL Report	Crawford 22'; D'Acol 26'; McGregor 66'; Imrie 71' (pen.)

Meadowbank Stadium, Edinburgh
Attendance: 459
Referee: Colin Steven
30 July 2016
15:00

Hamilton Academical	2–1	Livingston
D'Acol 22'; Longridge 55'	SPFL Report	Matthews 41' (o.g.)

New Douglas Park, Hamilton
Attendance: 764
Referee: Euan Anderson
30 July 2016
15:00

St Mirren	3–0	Edinburgh City
Shankland 12'; Walsh 30'; Baird 33'	SPFL Report

St Mirren Park, Paisley
Attendance: 1,800
Referee: Steven Kirkland

=== Group H ===
Pos	Team	Pld	W	PW	PL	L	GF	GA	GD	Pts	Qualification	GMO	KIL	CLY	ALB	BER
1	Morton (Q)	4	3	1	0	0	5	0	+5	**11**	Qualification for the Second Round	—	—	1–0	—	2–0
2	Kilmarnock	4	2	0	1	1	5	5	0	**7**		0–2	—	—	0–0p	—
3	Clyde	4	1	1	0	2	4	5	−1	**5**		—	1–2	—	—	p1–1
4	Albion Rovers	4	0	2	1	1	1	2	−1	**5**		0–0p	—	1–2	—	—
5	Berwick Rangers	4	0	0	2	2	3	6	−3	**2**		—	2–3	—	0–0p	—

Source: SPFL
(Q) Qualified to the phase indicated

==== Matches ====
16 July 2016
15:00

Albion Rovers	0–0	Morton
	BBC Report; SPFL Report
Penalties
Reid (penalty missed); Dunlop (penalty scored); McBride (penalty scored); Willis (penalty scored); Fisher (penalty missed)	3–4	(penalty scored) Tidser; (penalty scored) Tiffoney; (penalty scored) O'Ware; (penalty missed) Forbes; (penalty scored) Kilday

Cliftonhill, Coatbridge
Attendance: 431
Referee: Craig Napier
16 July 2016
15:00

Clyde	1–2	Kilmarnock
Watson 87'	BBC Report; SPFL Report	Coulibaly 69'; Boyle 76'

Broadwood Stadium, Cumbernauld
Attendance: 1,303
Referee: John Beaton
19 July 2016
19:45

Berwick Rangers	0–0	Albion Rovers
	SPFL Report
Penalties
McKenna (penalty scored); Martin (penalty scored); Fairbairn (penalty scored); Sheerin (penalty scored); Bauld (penalty missed); Thomson (penalty missed)	4–5	(penalty scored) Ferry; (penalty scored) Dunlop; (penalty scored) Willis; (penalty missed) Stewart; (penalty scored) Davidson; (penalty scored) Turnbull

Shielfield Park, Berwick, England
Attendance: 323
Referee: Grant Irvine
19 July 2016
19:45

Morton	1–0	Clyde
O'Ware 77'	SPFL Report

Cappielow, Greenock
Attendance: 931
Referee: John McKendrick
23 July 2016
15:00

Clyde	1–1	Berwick Rangers
MacDonald 49'	SPFL Report	Sheerin 64'
Penalties
McLaughin (penalty scored); MacDonald (penalty scored); Gormley (penalty scored); Easton (penalty scored); Linton (penalty scored); Lowdon (penalty scored)	6–5	(penalty scored) McKenna; (penalty scored) Martin; (penalty scored) Fairbairn; (penalty scored) Sheerin; (penalty scored) A Walker; (penalty missed) Beveridge

Broadwood Stadium, Cumbernauld
23 July 2016
15:00

Kilmarnock	0–2	Morton
	SPFL Report	Oliver 7'; Quitongo 67'

Rugby Park, Kilmarnock
Attendance: 3,020
Referee: Steven McLean
26 July 2016
19:45

Albion Rovers	1–2	Clyde
Davidson 59'	SPFL Report	McNeil 73'; Easton 90+1' (pen.)

Cliftonhill, Coatbridge
Attendance: 377
Referee: Gavin Ross
26 July 2016
19:45

Berwick Rangers	2–3	Kilmarnock
Fairbairn 11'; Mackie 56'	SPFL Report	Coulibaly 65', 70'; McKenzie 85'

Shielfield Park, Berwick, England
Attendance: 609
Referee: Gavin Duncan
30 July 2016
15:00

Kilmarnock	0–0	Albion Rovers
	SPFL Report
Penalties
Smith (penalty scored); Dicker (penalty scored); Magennis (penalty missed); Bojaj (penalty scored)	3–5	(penalty scored) Stewart; (penalty scored) M Dunlop; (penalty scored) Willis; (penalty scored) Turnbull; (penalty scored) McBride

Rugby Park, Kilmarnock
Attendance: 2,219
Referee: Alan Newlands
30 July 2016
15:00

Morton	2–0	Berwick Rangers
Lindsay 2'; Quitongo 16'	SPFL Report

Cappielow, Greenock
Attendance: 1,044
Referee: Bobby Madden

== Best runners-up ==
Pos	Team	Pld	W	D	L	GF	GA	GD	Pts	Qualification
1	Dundee United (Q)	4	2	2	0	10	3	+7	10	Qualification to the Second Round
2	Motherwell (Q)	4	3	0	1	9	3	+6	9	Qualification to the Second Round
3	Queen of the South (Q)	4	3	0	1	6	2	+4	9	Qualification to the Second Round
4	Ayr United (Q)	4	3	0	1	5	2	+3	9	Qualification to the Second Round
5	Raith Rovers	4	2	1	1	5	4	+1	8	
6	East Fife	4	2	1	1	5	4	+1	8	
7	Kilmarnock	4	2	1	1	5	5	0	7	
8	Falkirk	4	2	0	2	5	4	+1	6	

Updated to match(es) played on 30 July 2016. Source: BBC
Rules for classification: 1) Points, 2) goal difference, 3) goals scored, 4) away goals scored, 5) matches won, 6) away matches won, 7) drawing of lots
(Q) Qualified for the phase indicated

== Qualified teams ==
Team	Qualified as	Qualified on	Notes
Rangers	Group F winner	25 July 2016	Seeded for the Second Round draw
Peterhead	Group A winner	30 July 2016	
St Johnstone	Group B winner	30 July 2016	
Alloa Athletic	Group D winner	30 July 2016	Seeded for the Second Round draw
Partick Thistle	Group E winner	30 July 2016	Seeded for the Second Round draw
Hamilton Academical	Group G winner	30 July 2016	
Morton	Group H winner	30 July 2016	Seeded for the Second Round draw
Inverness CT	Group C winner	30 July 2016	
Motherwell	Best runner-up	30 July 2016	
Queen of the South	Best runner-up	30 July 2016	
Ayr United	Best runner-up	30 July 2016	
Dundee United	Best runner-up	31 July 2016	

== Top goalscorers ==
Rank	Player	Club	Goals
1	(Scotland) Brian Graham	Ross County	6
1	(Scotland) Greg Stewart	Dundee	6
3	(England) Scott Boden	Inverness CT	4
3	(Scotland) Andy Geggan	Dunfermline Athletic	4
3	(Scotland) Blair Henderson	Stirling Albion	4
3	(Scotland) Rory McAllister	Peterhead	4
3	(Scotland) Simon Murray	Dundee United	4
3	(Scotland) Iain Vigurs	Inverness CT	4
3	(England) Martyn Waghorn	Rangers	4
10	(Scotland) Adam Brown	Airdrieonians	3
10	(Ivory Coast) Souleymane Coulibaly	Kilmarnock	3
10	(England) Kane Hemmings	Dundee	3
10	(England) Marvin Johnson	Motherwell	3
10	(Scotland) Steven MacLean	St Johnstone	3
10	(Netherlands) Alex Schalk	Ross County	3
10	(Scotland) Greig Spence	Alloa Athletic	3
10	(Scotland) Danny Swanson	St Johnstone	3
10	(England) Carl Tremarco	Inverness CT	3
