= 2016–17 Dumbarton F.C. season =

Dumbarton
2016–17 season
- Chairman: Alan Jardine
- Manager: Stevie Aitken
- Stadium: Dumbarton Football Stadium
- Championship: 8th
- Challenge Cup: Third Round
- League Cup: Prelims
- Scottish Cup: Third Round
- Top goalscorer: League: Robert Thomson (11); All: Robert Thomson (12)
Home colours	Away colours

The 2016–17 season is Dumbarton's fifth consecutive season back in the second tier of Scottish football and their fourth season in the Scottish Championship, having won promotion via the play-offs from the Scottish Second Division at the end of the 2011–12 season. This is Stevie Aitken's second full season as manager.

Dumbarton finished eighth in the Scottish Championship. Dumbarton did not advance beyond the group stage of the newly revamped League Cup, drawing 2 and losing 2 of the qualifying matches. In the Challenge Cup, Dumbarton's abysmal record in this competition continued (5 wins from 31 starts) with a third round exit to League One opponents, Stranraer. And it was a disastrous first hurdle exit to non-league junior side Bonnyrigg Rose in the third round of the Scottish Cup.

== Results & fixtures ==
Win Draw Loss Abandoned or Postponed

=== Pre Season ===
28 June 2016 Friendly	Dumbarton	1–2	Dundee	Dumbarton Football Stadium
19:30	Buchanan 70'	DFC Report	Kerr 20'; Kerr 89'	Attendance: 300; Referee: Nick Walsh

4 July 2016 Friendly	Cumbernauld Colts	0–3	Dumbarton	Broadwood Stadium
20:00		DFC Report	Stevenson 76' (pen.); Tatar 79'; Thomson 83'	Attendance: 200; Referee: Grant Irvine

5 July 2016 Friendly	Stranraer	2–1	Dumbarton	New Tinto Park, Glasgow
	Goal		Goal

9 July 2016 Friendly	Dumbarton	1–2	Motherwell	Dumbarton Football Stadium
12:30	Thomson 24'	DFC Report	MacLean 63'; Moore 75'	Attendance: 334; Referee: Willie Collum

2 August 2016 Friendly	Clydebank	2–0	Dumbarton	Holm Park, Clydebank
	Goal

=== League Cup ===
16 July 2016 Group A	Forfar Athletic	2–2 (5–3 p)	Dumbarton	Station Park, Forfar
15:00	Peters 35'; O'Brien 62'	SPFL Report	Gallagher 54'; Fleming 69' (pen.)	Attendance: 426; Referee: David Lowe

19 July 2016 Group A	Dumbarton	0–2	East Fife	Dumbarton Football Stadium
19:45		SPFL Report	Smith 19'; McManus 39'	Attendance: 452; Referee: Craig Charleston

23 July 2016 Group A	Dundee	6–2	Dumbarton	Dens Park
15:00	Stewart 16'; Hemmings 48'; O'Dea 73'; Stewart 74'; Stewart 80'; Hemmings 85'	SPFL Report	Wright 26'; Buchanan 33'	Attendance: 2,319; Referee: Kevin Clancy

30 July 2016 Group A	Dumbarton	3–3 (5–6 p)	Peterhead	Dumbarton Football Stadium
15:00	Thomson 21'; Smith 36'; Stevenson 48' (pen.)	SPFL Report	Dzierzawski 16'; McIntosh 57'; McAllister 69' (pen.)	Attendance: 305; Referee: Alan Muir

=== Challenge Cup ===
3 September 2016 Round 3	Stranraer	1–0	Dumbarton	Stair Park
15:00	McGuigan 84'	SPFL Report		Attendance: 401; Referee: John McKendrick

=== Scottish Championship ===
6 August 2016 Championship	Dunfermline Athletic	4–3	Dumbarton	East End Park
15:00	Cardle 23', 26', 66'; Hopkirk 81'; Ashcroft (red card) 90+4'	SPFL Report	Thomson 18'; Docherty 90+1' (pen.), 90+4' (pen.)	Attendance: 3,496; Referee: Barry Cook

13 August 2016 Championship	Dumbarton	1–0	Dundee United	Dumbarton Football Stadium
15:00	Docherty 54' (pen.)	SPFL Report		Attendance: 1,475; Referee: Gavin Duncan; Man of the Match: Mark Docherty

20 August 2016 Championship	Morton	1–1	Dumbarton	Cappielow Park
15:00	Oyenuga 62'	SPFL Report	OG 28'	Attendance: 1,586; Referee: Mat Northcroft

27 August 2016 Championship	Falkirk	1–0	Dumbarton	Falkirk Stadium
15:00	Miller 86'	SPFL Report		Attendance: 4,311; Referee: Don Robertson

10 September 2016 Championship	Dumbarton	0–1	Hibernian	Dumbarton Football Stadium
15:00		SPFL Report	Cummings 32' (pen.)	Attendance: 1,339; Referee: Greg Aitken; Man of the Match: Craig Pettigrew

17 September 2016 Championship	Dumbarton	1–1	St Mirren	Dumbarton Football Stadium
15:00	Stirling 15'	SPFL Report	Hardie 41'	Attendance: 1,101; Referee: Stephen Finnie; Man of the Match: Andy Stirling

24 September 2016 Championship	Raith Rovers	3–2	Dumbarton	Starks Park
15:00	McHattie 15'; Callachan 34'; Roberts 35'	SPFL Report	Stevenson 71'; R Thomson 71'	Attendance: 1,636; Referee: Steve Kirkland

1 October 2016 Championship	Dumbarton	0–0	Queen of the South	Dumbarton Football Stadium
15:00		SPFL Report		Attendance: 840; Referee: Mat Northcroft; Man of the Match: Mark Docherty

15 October 2016 Championship	Dumbarton	0–3	Ayr United	Dumbarton Football Stadium
15:00		SPFL Report	Forrest 2', 50', 62' (pen.)	Attendance: 1,005; Referee: Gavin Duncan

22 October 2016 Championship	Dundee United	2–1	Dumbarton	Tannadice Park
15:00	Buchanan 53' (o.g.); Edjenguélé 66'	SPFL Report	Thomson 73'	Attendance: 5,979; Referee: Craig Charleston

29 October 2016 Championship	Dumbarton	2–2	Dunfermline Athletic	Dumbarton Football Stadium
15:00	Joe Thomson 37'; Garry Fleming 82'	SPFL Report	Nicky Clark 50'; Joe Cardle 80'	Attendance: 1,018; Referee: Steve Kirkland; Man of the Match: Mark Docherty

5 November 2016 Championship	St Mirren	0–1	Dumbarton	Paisley 2021 Stadium
15:00		SPFL Report	Fleming 63'	Attendance: 2,758; Referee: John McKendrick

12 November 2016 Championship	Dumbarton	0–2	Morton	Dumbarton Football Stadium
15:00		SPFL Report	Russell 69'; Oyenuga 76'	Attendance: 1,147; Referee: Don Robertson; Man of the Match: Alan Martin

19 November 2016 Championship	Dumbarton	0–0	Raith Rovers	Dumbarton Football Stadium
15:00		SPFL Report		Attendance: 600; Referee: Alan Muir; Man of the Match: Darren Barr

3 December 2016 Championship	Queen of the South	1–2	Dumbarton	Palmerston Park
15:00	Lyle 80'	SPFL Report	Stevenson 32'; Fleming 42' (pen.)	Attendance: 1,261; Referee: Gavin Duncan

10 December 2016 Championship	Hibernian	2–0	Dumbarton	Easter Road
15:00	Hanlon 45'; Graham 76'	SPFL Report		Attendance: 13,881; Referee: John McKendrick

17 December 2016 Championship	Dumbarton	2–1	Falkirk	Dumbarton Football Stadium
15:00	R Thomson 44'; Fleming 68'	SPFL Report	Sibbald 66'	Attendance: 832; Referee: Mat Northcroft; Man of the Match: R Thomson

24 December 2016 Championship	Ayr United	4–4	Dumbarton	Somerset Park
12:30	McKenna 31'; Harkins 43'; Forrest 74' (pen.); Cairney 85'	SPFL Report	Robert Thomson 45+2'; Harvie 52'; Joe Thomson 84'; Stevenson 88'	Attendance: 1,441; Referee: Craig Charleston

31 December 2016 Championship	Dumbarton	1–0	Dundee United	Dumbarton Football Stadium
13:30	Docherty 27'	SPFL Report		Attendance: 1,221; Referee: Stephen Finnie; Man of the Match: Mark Docherty

7 January 2017 Championship	Morton	2–1	Dumbarton	Cappielow Park
15:00	OG 19'; Tidser 66' (pen.)	SPFL Report	Stirling 69'	Attendance: 2,094; Referee: John Beaton

14 January 2017 Championship	Dumbarton	0–1	Hibernian	Dumbarton Football Stadium
15:00		SPFL Report	Commons 14'	Attendance: 1,523; Referee: Nick Walsh; Man of the Match: Lewis Vaughan

21 January 2017 Championship	Dumbarton	1–2	Queen of the South	Dumbarton Football Stadium
15:00	Nade 61'	SPFL Report	Thomas 24' (68)	Attendance: 825; Referee: Steve Kirkland

28 January 2017 Championship	Raith Rovers	1–3	Dumbarton	Starks Park
15:00	Hardie 27'	SPFL Report	Nade 49'; Harvie 57'; Buchanan 63'	Attendance: 1,413; Referee: Mat Northcroft

4 February 2017 Championship	Dumbarton	2–2	St Mirren	Dumbarton Football Stadium
15:00	Nade 56'; R Thomson 80'	SPFL Report	Clarkson 35'; Davis 71'	Attendance: 1,377; Referee: John Beaton; Man of the Match: Andy Stirling

18 February 2017 Championship	Dumbarton	2–2	Ayr United	Dumbarton Football Stadium
15:00	Sam Stanton 62', 75'	SPFL Report	Rose 90+1'; Moore 90+3' (pen.)	Attendance: 1,198; Referee: John McKendrick; Man of the Match: Sam Stanton

25 February 2017 Championship	Falkirk	2–2	Dumbarton	Falkirk Stadium
15:00	Leahy 37'; Austin 59'	SPFL Report	Vaughan 38'; Stirling 51'	Attendance: 4,160; Referee: Mat Northcroft

4 March 2017 Championship	Dunfermline Athletic	5–1	Dumbarton	East End Park
15:00	Clark 7', 60', 79', 84'; McMullan 27'	SPFL Report	Harvie 86'	Attendance: 3,320; Referee: Kevin Clancy

11 March 2017 Championship	Dumbarton	4–0	Raith Rovers	Dumbarton Football Stadium
15:00	Thomson, R 6', 44'; Stanton 46'; Fleming 90+4'	SPFL Report		Attendance: 719; Referee: Alan Newlands; Man of the Match: Robert Thomson

18 March 2017 Championship	Hibernian	2–2	Dumbarton	Easter Road
15:00	OG 57'; Boyle 83'	SPFL Report	Nade 57' (pen.); Thomson, R 62'	Attendance: 14,093; Referee: Gavin Duncan

25 March 2017 Championship	Ayr United	2–1	Dumbarton	Somerset Park
12:30	El Alagui 45+1'; Crawford 51'	SPFL Report	Thomson, R 21'	Attendance: 1,608; Referee: Craig Charleston

1 April 2017 Championship	Dumbarton	1–0	Morton	Dumbarton Football Stadium
15:00	Vaughan 59'	SPFL Report		Attendance: 1,323; Referee: John Beaton; Man of the Match: Lewis Vaughan

8 April 2017 Championship	St Mirren	1–1	Dumbarton	Paisley 2021 Stadium
15:00	Magennis 10'	SPFL Report	Vaughan 37'	Attendance: 3,906; Referee: Steven Kirkland

15 April 2017 Championship	Dumbarton	0–2	Dunfermline Athletic	Dumbarton Football Stadium
15:00		SPFL Report	McCabe 80'; Hopkirk 85'	Attendance: 1,142; Referee: Alan Muir; Man of the Match: Alan Martin

22 April 2017 Championship	Queen of the South	1–2	Dumbarton	Palmerston Park
15:00	Dobbie 15'	SPFL Report	Stanton 20'; Thomson R 39'	Attendance: 1,289; Referee: John McKendrick

29 April 2017 Championship	Dundee United	2–2	Dumbarton	Tannadice Park
15:00	Andreu 22'; Mikkelsen 79'	SPFL Report	Thomson R 35'; Vaughan 65'	Attendance: 5,107; Referee: Nick Walsh; Man of the Match: Andy Stirling

6 May 2017 Championship	Dumbarton	0–1	Falkirk	Dumbarton Football Stadium
15:00		SPFL Report	Austin 85'	Attendance: 1,660; Referee: Don Robertson

=== Scottish Cup ===
26 November 2016 Round 3	Bonnyrigg Rose	0–0	Dumbarton	New Dundas Park, Bonnyrigg
15:00		BBC Report		Attendance: 1,552; Referee: Stephen Finnie

6 December 2016 Round 3 Replay	Dumbarton	0–1	Bonnyrigg Rose	Dumbarton Football Stadium
19:45		DFC Report	Nelson 86'	Attendance: 632; Referee: Greg Aitken

== Player statistics ==
=== Squad ===
Last updated 7 May 2017

No.	Pos	Nat	Player	Total		Scottish Championship		Challenge Cup		League Cup		Scottish Cup	
No.	Pos	Nat	Player	Apps	Goals	Apps	Goals	Apps	Goals	Apps	Goals	Apps	Goals
	GK	(Scotland) SCO	Jamie Barclay	0	0	0+0	0	0+0	0	0+0	0	0+0	0
	GK	(Scotland) SCO	Mark Brown	5	0	0+1	0	0+0	0	4+0	0	0+0	0
	GK	(Scotland) SCO	Jamie Ewings	0	0	0+0	0	0+0	0	0+0	0	0+0	0
	GK	(Scotland) SCO	Alan Martin	39	0	36+0	0	1+0	0	0+0	0	2+0	0
	DF	(Scotland) SCO	Darren Barr	35	0	31+1	0	1+0	0	0+0	0	2+0	0
	DF	(Scotland) SCO	Gregor Buchanan	40	2	33+0	1	1+0	0	4+0	1	2+0	0
	DF	(Scotland) SCO	Mark Docherty	35	4	23+5	4	1+0	0	4+0	0	2+0	0
	DF	(Scotland) SCO	Daniel Harvie	34	3	34+0	3	0+0	0	0+0	0	0+0	0
	DF	(Scotland) SCO	Tom Lang	6	0	1+5	0	0+0	0	0+0	0	0+0	0
	DF	(Scotland) SCO	Ross McCrorie	9	0	6+3	0	0+0	0	0+0	0	0+0	0
	DF	(Scotland) SCO	Craig Pettigrew	19	0	10+2	0	1+0	0	4+0	0	1+1	0
	DF	(Scotland) SCO	Frazer Wright	5	1	2+0	0	0+0	0	3+0	1	0+0	0
	MF	(Scotland) SCO	Stuart Carswell	16	0	16+0	0	0+0	0	0+0	0	0+0	0
	MF	(Scotland) SCO	Ryan Clark	0	0	0+0	0	0+0	0	0+0	0	0+0	0
	MF	(Scotland) SCO	Grant Gallagher	13	1	8+2	0	1+0	0	2+0	1	0+0	0
	MF	(Scotland) SCO	Ross Lyden	2	0	1+1	0	0+0	0	0+0	0	0+0	0
	MF	(Scotland) SCO	Kyle Prior	1	0	0+1	0	0+0	0	0+0	0	0+0	0
	MF	(Scotland) SCO	David Smith	43	1	34+2	0	0+1	0	4+0	1	2+0	0
	MF	(Scotland) SCO	Sam Stanton	27	4	22+4	4	1+0	0	0+0	0	0+0	0
	MF	(Scotland) SCO	Ryan Stevenson	24	4	9+8	3	1+0	0	4+0	1	2+0	0
	MF	(Scotland) SCO	Andy Stirling	41	3	26+8	3	1+0	0	4+0	0	2+0	0
	MF	(Scotland) SCO	Joe Thomson	20	2	19+0	2	0+0	0	0+0	0	1+0	0
	FW	(Scotland) SCO	Garry Fleming	36	5	14+15	4	0+1	0	4+0	1	2+0	0
	FW	(Scotland) SCO	Calum Gallagher	3	0	1+2	0	0+0	0	0+0	0	0+0	0
	FW	(Senegal) SEN	Amadou Kassaraté	2	0	0+0	0	0+0	0	0+2	0	0+0	0
	FW	(Scotland) SCO	Donald McCallum	12	0	1+6	0	0+1	0	0+2	0	1+1	0
	FW	(France) FRA	Christian Nadé	15	4	10+5	4	0+0	0	0+0	0	0+0	0
	FW	(England) ENG	Joe Nuttall	2	0	0+2	0	0	0	0	0	0	0
	FW	(Scotland) SCO	Robert Thomson	42	14	34+1	13	1+0	0	4+0	1	1+1	0
	FW	(England) ENG	Josh Todd	26	0	16+3	0	1+0	0	3+1	0	2+0	0
	FW	(Scotland) SCO	Lewis Vaughan	15	4	11+4	4	0+0	0	0+0	0	0+0	0

== Transfers ==
=== Players in ===
Player	From	Fee
(Scotland) Robert Thomson	(Scotland) Brechin City	Free
(Scotland) Andy Stirling	(Scotland) Stranraer	Free
(Scotland) Craig Pettigrew	(Scotland) Stranraer	Free
(Scotland) Ryan Stevenson	(Scotland) Ayr United	Free
(Scotland) David Smith	(Scotland) Falkirk	Free
(Scotland) Jamie Barclay	(Scotland) Stenhousemuir	Free
(England) Josh Todd	(Scotland) Annan Athletic	Free
(Scotland) Daniel Harvie	(Scotland) Aberdeen	Loan
(Scotland) Alan Martin	(Scotland) Hamilton	Free
(Scotland) Joe Thomson	(Scotland) Celtic	Loan
(Scotland) Sam Stanton	(Scotland) Hibernian	Loan
(France) Christian Nadé	(Scotland) Stranraer	Free
(Scotland) Lewis Vaughan	(Scotland) Raith Rovers	Loan
(Scotland) Stuart Carswell	(Iceland) Keflavik	Free
(Scotland) Tom Lang	(Scotland) Rangers	Free
(Scotland) Calum Gallagher	(Scotland) St Mirren	Free
(Scotland) Ross McCrorie	(Scotland) Rangers	Loan
(England) Joe Nuttall	(Scotland) Aberdeen	Loan

=== Players out ===
Player	To	Fee
(Scotland) Kevin Cawley	(Scotland) Alloa Athletic	Free
(Republic of Ireland) Paul Heffernan		Free
(Scotland) Mikey Hopkins		Free
(Scotland) Jordan Kirkpatrick	(Scotland) Alloa Athletic	Free
(Scotland) Scott Taggart	(Scotland) Alloa Athletic	Free
(England) Jon Routledge	(Wales) New Saints	Free
(Scotland) Steven Saunders	(Wales) New Saints	Free
(France) Christian Nadé	(Scotland) Stranraer	Free
(Scotland) Jamie Barclay	(Scotland) East Stirlingshire	Free
(Scotland) Ryan Clark	(Scotland) Kilwinning Rangers	Loan
(Senegal) Amadou Kassaraté	(Scotland) Kirkintilloch Rob Roy	Loan
(Scotland) Ryan Stevenson	(Scotland) Raith Rovers	Free
(Scotland) Frazer Wright	(Scotland) Stirling Albion	Free
(Scotland) Craig Pettigrew	(Scotland) Stranraer	Free
(England) Josh Todd	(Scotland) St Mirren	Free
(Scotland) Donald McCallum	(Scotland) Arbroath	Loan
(Senegal) Amadou Kassaraté	(Scotland) Stranraer	Loan
(Scotland) Mark Brown		Retired

== See also ==
- List of Dumbarton F.C. seasons
