= 2014–15 Dumbarton F.C. season =

Dumbarton
2014–15 season
- Chairman: Alan Jardine
- Manager: Ian Murray
- Stadium: Bet Butler Stadium
- Championship: 7th
- Challenge Cup: First round (eliminated by Stranraer)
- League Cup: Second round (eliminated by Hibernian)
- Scottish Cup: Third round (eliminated by Rangers)
- Top goalscorer: League: Garry Fleming (6); All: Garry Fleming (6)
Home colours	Away colours

The 2014–15 season was Dumbarton's third consecutive season in the second tier of Scottish football – the Scottish Championship, having been promoted from the Scottish Second Division at the end of the 2011–12 season. The season marked Ian Murray's second full season as manager.

Dumbarton finished seventh in the Scottish Championship. They continued their poor form in the Challenge Cup by losing in the first round to Stranraer. Additionally, Dumbarton only reached the second round of the League Cup and the third round of the Scottish Cup.

== Results & fixtures ==
Win Draw Loss Postponed

=== Pre season/other matches ===
3 July 2014 Friendly	Vale of Leithen	0–4	Dumbarton	Victoria Park, Innerleithen
19:30	Goal	Report	Kirkpatrick 4', 23'; Nish; Scott Taggart	Attendance: 100

5 July 2014 Friendly	Edinburgh City	0–2	Dumbarton	Ainslie Park
15:00	Goal	Report	Trialist; Kirkpatrick	Attendance: 100

15 July 2014 Friendly	Hamilton	3–1	Dumbarton	New Douglas Park
	Antonie-Curier 20' (pen.) 75'	Report	Kirkpatrick	Attendance: 300

19 July 2014 Friendly	Dumbarton	1–1	Partick Thistle	Bet Butler Stadium
15:00	Prunty 57'	Report	Stevenson 79'	Attendance: 600

29 July 2014 Friendly	Dumbarton	0–2	Carlisle	Bet Butler Stadium
19:45		Report	Amoo 46'; Dempsey 89'	Attendance: 353; Referee: Don Robertson

29 July 2014 Friendly	Dumbarton	8–1	Grindlay XI	Bet Butler Stadium
15:00	McCalllum; Kirkpatrick; Megginson; Turner; Taggart; Hopkins		Goal

=== SPFL Championship ===
9 August 2014 Championship	Raith Rovers	3–1	Dumbarton	Stark's Park
15:00	Watson 56'; Conroy 78'; Nadé 81'	Dumbarton Report; SPFL Report	Agnew 90'	Attendance: 1,642; Referee: Beaton

16 August 2014 Championship	Dumbarton	0–4	Queen of the South	Bet Butler Stadium
15:00		SPFL Report	Lyle 20'; Reilly 50'; Fowler 68'; Russell 77'	Attendance: 958; Referee: D Robertson

23 August 2014 Championship	Rangers	4–1	Dumbarton	Ibrox Stadium
15:00	McCulloch 15'; McGregor 30'; Clark 54'; Turner 76' (Own goal)	SPFL Report	Mohsni 81' (Own goal)	Attendance: 31,175; Referee: Colvin

30 August 2014 Championship	Dumbarton	1–0	Livingston	Bet Butler Stadium
15:00	Kane 89'	SPFL Report		Attendance: 814; Referee: Cook

13 September 2014 Championship	Dumbarton	0–0	Heart of Midlothian	Dumbarton Football Stadium
15:00		BBC Report		Attendance: 1,757; Referee: Salmond

20 September 2014 Championship	Falkirk	1–1	Dumbarton	Falkirk Stadium
15:00	Sibbald 5'	BBC Report	Kane 90+2'	Attendance: 3,503; Referee: Graham

27 September 2014 Championship	Dumbarton	3–1	Alloa Athletic	Dumbarton Football Stadium
15:00	Campbell 39'; Kirkpatrick 54'; Nish 78'	Report	Simmons 90+1'	Attendance: 758; Referee: (Scotland) McLean

4 October 2014 Championship	Dumbarton	0–0	Cowdenbeath	Dumbarton Football Stadium
15:00	Fleming (yellow card) 79'	Report		Attendance: 851; Referee: (Scotland) Greg Aitken

11 October 2014 Championship	Hibernian	0–0	Dumbarton	Easter Road
15:00	Malonga (yellow card) 45'; Cummings (yellow card) 68'; Robertson (yellow card) 74'	Report	Agnew (yellow card) 9'; Graham (yellow card) 43'; Gilhaney (yellow card) 55' linton (yellow card) 90+2'	Attendance: 7,923; Referee: (Scotland) Barry Cook

18 October 2014 Championship	Heart of Midlothian	5–1	Dumbarton	Tynecastle Stadium
15:00	Sow 26'; Buaben 40' (pen.); Holt 56'; Paterson 84'; King 88'	Report	Nish (yellow card) 25'; Fleming (yellow card) 42' (goal) 73'	Attendance: 15,522; Referee: (Scotland) John McKendrick

25 October 2014 Championship	Dumbarton	0–3	Rangers	Dumbarton Football Stadium
15:00		Report	Miller 26'; Wallace 61'; Boyd 73'	Attendance: 1,850; Referee: (Scotland) Andrew Dallas

8 November 2014 Championship	Queen of the South	3–0	Dumbarton	Palmerston Park
15:00	Baird 33'; Durnan 69'; Lyle 71'	Report		Attendance: 1,677; Referee: (Scotland) Craig Thomson

15 November 2014 Championship	Livingston	1–2	Dumbarton	Almondvale Stadium
15:00	Mullen 29'	Report	Fleming 62'; Megginson 70'	Attendance: 1,020; Referee: (Scotland) Stephen Finnie

22 November 2014 Championship	Dumbarton	3–6	Hibernian	Dumbarton Football Stadium
15:00	Kane 50'; Graham 61'; Fleming 71'	Report	Allan 23'; Malonga 25'; Hanlon 30'; Malonga 64'; Stanton 83'; Malonga 85'	Attendance: 1,409; Referee: (Scotland) Calum Murray

6 December 2014 Championship	Alloa Athletic	0–1	Dumbarton	Recreation Park, Alloa
15:00		Report	Kane 9'	Attendance: 666; Referee: (Scotland) Craig Thomson

13 December 2014 Championship	Dumbarton	2–1	Raith Rovers	Dumbarton Football Stadium
15:00	Agnew 20'; Agnew 88'	Report	Stewart, M 63'	Attendance: 764; Referee: (Scotland) Bobby Madden

20 December 2014 Championship	Dumbarton	0–3	Falkirk	Dumbarton Football Stadium
15:00		Report	Loy 11'; Alston 80'; Sibbald 83'	Attendance: 663; Referee: (Scotland) Des Roache

27 December 2014 Championship	Cowdenbeath	1–3	Dumbarton	Central Park, Cowdenbeath
15:00	Sutherland 66'	Report	Nish 36'; Mair 68'; Fleming 73'	Attendance: 556; Referee: (Scotland) Kevin Clancy

3 January 2015 Championship	Rangers	3–1	Dumbarton	Ibrox Stadium
15:00	Daly 22'; Wallace 41'; Shiels 90+3'	SPFL Report	Graham 15'	Attendance: 30,031; Referee: Colvin

10 January 2015 Championship	Dumbarton	1–5	Heart of Midlothian	Dumbarton Football Stadium
15:00	Kane 63'	SPFL Report	Nicholson 8'; Walker 26'; Zeefuik 52'; Nicholson 57'; Zeefuik 62'	Attendance: 1,537; Referee: John Beaton

17 January 2015 Championship	Raith Rovers	2–1	Dumbarton	Starks Park
15:00	Conroy 29'; Anderson 32'	SPFL Report	Megginson 81'	Attendance: 1,474; Referee: John McKendrick

24 January 2015 Championship	Dumbarton	1–5	Livingston	Dumbarton Football Stadium
15:00	McCallum 87'	SPFL Report	White 5'; Mullen 63'; Mullen 73'; Jacobs 79'; White 82'	Attendance: 793; Referee: Craig Charleston

31 January 2015 Championship	Falkirk	3–3	Dumbarton	Falkirk Stadium
15:00	Sibbald 21'; Leahy 35'; Smith 80'	SPFL Report	Taggart 19'; Petrie 63'; Campbell 71'	Attendance: 3,703; Referee: George Salmond

14 February 2015 Championship	Dumbarton	1–2	Cowdenbeath	Dumbarton Football Stadium
15:00	Taggart 34'	SPFL Report	Brownlie 70'; Oyenuga 73'	Attendance: 756; Referee: (Scotland) Don Robertson

21 February 2015 Championship	Hibernian	3–0	Dumbarton	Easter Road
15:00	Dja Djedge 29'; Malonga 32'; Malonga 56'	SPFL Report		Attendance: 8,370; Referee: (Scotland) Greg Aitken

28 February 2015 Championship	Dumbarton	0–0	Queen of the South	Dumbarton Football Stadium
15:00		SPFL Report		Attendance: 904; Referee: Steven McLean

7 March 2015 Championship	Dumbarton	1–0	Alloa Athletic	Dumbarton Football Stadium
15:00	Fleming 42'	SPFL Report		Attendance: 791; Referee: (Scotland) Andrew Dallas

14 March 2015 Championship	Heart of Midlothian	4–0	Dumbarton	Tynecastle Stadium
15:00	Sow 53'; Wilson 69'; King 86'; King 90'	SPFL Report		Attendance: 15,631; Referee: (Scotland) John Beaton

21 March 2015 Championship	Livingston	1–2	Dumbarton	Almondvale Stadium
15:00	Sives 14'	SPFL Report	Agnew 80'; Fleming 88'	Attendance: 831; Referee: (Scotland) John McKendrick

28 March 2015 Championship	Dumbarton	1–0	Falkirk	Dumbarton Football Stadium
15:00	Campbell 81'	SPFL Report		Attendance: 1,016; Referee: (Scotland) Greg Aitken

4 April 2015 Championship	Cowdenbeath	3–0	Dumbarton	Central Park, Cowdenbeath
15:00	Toshney 44'; Higgins 48'; Nish 79'	SPFL Report		Attendance: 515; Referee: (Scotland) Barry Cook

8 April 2015 Championship	Dumbarton	1–2	Hibernian	Dumbarton Football Stadium
19:45	Megginson 55'	SPFL Report	Hanlon 42'; Cummings 66'	Attendance: 1,110; Referee: (Scotland) Craig Charleston

11 April 2015 Championship	Alloa Athletic	3–0	Dumbarton	Recreation Park, Alloa
15:00	Flannigan 7'; Cawley 21'; Spence 71'	SPFLReport		Attendance: 535; Referee: (Scotland) Kevin Graham

18 April 2015 Championship	Dumbarton	1–3	Rangers	Dumbarton Football Stadium
15:00	Wilson 2'	SPFLReport	Hardie 10'; Hardie 48'; Vuckic 52'	Attendance: 1,766; Referee: (Scotland) Craig Thomson

25 April 2015 Championship	Queen of the South	2–1	Dumbarton	Palmerston Park
15:00	Holt 55'; McKenna 72'	SPFL Report	McCallum 80'	Attendance: 1,865; Referee: (Scotland) Brian Colvin

2 May 2015 Championship	Dumbarton	2–2	Raith Rovers	Dumbarton Football Stadium
15:00	Kirkpatrick 21'; Agnew 78'	SPFL Report	Stewart 53'; Vaughan 80'	Attendance: 801; Referee: (Scotland) Mat Thorncroft

=== Scottish Challenge Cup ===
26 July 2014 Scottish Challenge Cup round 1	Stranraer	3–2	Dumbarton	Stair Park
15:00	McKeown 64', 77'; Winter 90+4'	Dumbarton Report; SPFL Report	Kirkpatrick 4'; Gilhaney 45'	Attendance: 355; Referee: Roache

=== Scottish League Cup ===
2 August 2014 Scottish League Cup round 1	Brechin City	0–1	Dumbarton	Glebe Park
15:00		Dumbarton Report; SPFL Report	Graham 59'	Attendance: 379; Referee: Clancy

26 August 2014 Scottish League Cup round 2	Hibernian	3–2	Dumbarton	Easter Road
19:45	El Alagui 78', 84'; Stanton 90+1'	BBC Report	Megginson 52'; Gilhaney 59'	Attendance: 5,066; Referee: Robertson

=== Scottish Cup ===
1 November 2014 Scottish Cup round 3	Dumbarton	0–1	Rangers	Dumbarton Football Stadium
15:00		Report	Boyd 45'	Attendance: 1,878; Referee: Bobby Madden

=== Stirlingshire Cup ===
17 March 2015 Round 1	Dumbarton	3–1	Falkirk	Dumbarton Football Stadium
19:45	Petrie 17'; Megginson 43'; Megginson 45'	Report	Sneddon 85'	Attendance: 120; Referee: Colin Steven

15 April 2015 Semi Final	East Stirling	2–0	Dumbarton	Ochilview Park
19:45	Wallace 54'; Townsley 77'	Report		Attendance: 124; Referee: Gavin Duncan

== League table ==
Pos	Team	Pld	W	D	L	GF	GA	GD	Pts	Promotion, qualification or relegation
5	Falkirk	36	14	11	11	48	48	0	53	
6	Raith Rovers	36	12	7	17	42	65	−23	43	
7	Dumbarton	36	9	7	20	36	79	−43	34	
8	Livingston (Note: Livingston were deducted 5 points due to failure of tax payments.)	36	8	8	20	41	53	−12	27	
9	Alloa Athletic (O)	36	6	9	21	34	56	−22	27	Qualification for the Championship play-offs

Source: Soccerway
Rules for classification: 1) Points; 2) Goal difference; 3) Number of goals scored
(O) Play-off winners

== Player statistics ==
As of 16 July 2016

No.	Pos	Nat	Player	Total		Championship		Challenge Cup		League Cup		Scottish Cup	
No.	Pos	Nat	Player	Apps	Goals	Apps	Goals	Apps	Goals	Apps	Goals	Apps	Goals
	GK	(Scotland) SCO	Jamie Ewings	3	0	2+0	0	0+0	0	0+0	0	1+0	0
	GK	(Scotland) SCO	Stephen Grindlay	1	0	0+0	0	1+0	0	0+0	0	0+0	0
	GK	(Scotland) SCO	Josh Lumsden	0	0	0+0	0	0+0	0	0+0	0	0+0	0
	GK	(Republic of Ireland) IRL	Danny Rogers	36	0	34+0	0	0+0	0	2+0	0	0+0	0
	DF	(Scotland) SCO	Joseph Coleman	0	0	0+0	0	0+0	0	0+0	0	0+0	0
	DF	(Scotland) SCO	Stuart Findlay	15	0	15+0	0	0+0	0	0+0	0	0+0	0
	DF	(Scotland) SCO	Andy Graham	38	3	34+0	2	1+0	0	2+0	1	1+0	0
	DF	(Scotland) SCO	Scott Linton	32	0	24+4	0	1+0	0	2+0	0	1+0	0
	DF	(Scotland) SCO	Lee Mair	15	1	12+1	1	0+0	0	1+0	0	1+0	0
	DF	(Scotland) SCO	Kieran MacDonald	13	0	4+9	0	0+0	0	0+0	0	0+0	0
	DF	(Scotland) SCO	Mark McLaughlin	4	0	2+1	0	0+0	0	0+0	0	1+0	0
	DF	(Scotland) SCO	Scott Taggart	35	2	28+5	2	1+0	0	1+0	0	0+0	0
	DF	(Republic of Ireland) IRL	David van Zanten	23	0	19+0	0	1+0	0	2+0	0	0+1	0
	DF	(Scotland) SCO	Mark Wilson	11	1	9+2	1	0+0	0	0+0	0	0+0	0
	MF	(Scotland) SCO	Scott Agnew	40	5	35+1	5	1+0	0	2+0	0	1+0	0
	MF	(Scotland) SCO	Ryan Clark	2	0	0+2	0	0+0	0	0+0	0	0+0	0
	MF	(Scotland) SCO	Dylan Easton	13	0	8+5	0	0+0	0	0+0	0	0+0	0
	MF	(Scotland) SCO	Garry Fleming	34	6	28+3	6	1+0	0	1+0	0	1+0	0
	MF	(Scotland) SCO	Mark Gilhaney	37	2	27+6	0	1+0	1	2+0	1	1+0	0
	MF	(Scotland) SCO	Jordan Kirkpatrick	23	3	15+5	2	1+0	1	0+2	0	0+0	0
	MF	(Scotland) SCO	Alistair McKerracher	0	0	0+0	0	0+0	0	0+0	0	0+0	0
	MF	(Scotland) SCO	Hugh Murray	2	0	0+1	0	1+0	0	0+0	0	0+0	0
	MF	(Scotland) SCO	Darren Petrie	8	1	5+3	1	0+0	0	0+0	0	0+0	0
	MF	(Northern Ireland) NIR	Chris Turner	28	0	21+4	0	0+0	0	2+0	0	0+1	0
	FW	(Scotland) SCO	Archie Campbell	38	3	20+14	3	0+1	0	0+2	0	1+0	0
	FW	(Scotland) SCO	Chris Duggan	7	0	4+3	0	0+0	0	0+0	0	0+0	0
	FW	(Scotland) SCO	Chris Kane	10	5	8+2	5	0+0	0	0+0	0	0+0	0
	FW	(Scotland) SCO	Colin Nish	24	2	14+6	2	0+1	0	2+0	0	1+0	0
	FW	(Scotland) SCO	Donald McCallum	5	2	0+5	2	0+0	0	0+0	0	0+0	0
	FW	(Scotland) SCO	Steven McDougall	10	0	2+6	0	0+0	0	0+1	0	0+1	0
	FW	(Scotland) SCO	Mitchel Megginson	40	4	26+10	3	1+0	0	2+0	1	1+0	0
	FW	(Scotland) SCO	Bryan Prunty	5	0	0+2	0	0+1	0	1+1	0	0+0	0

== Transfers ==
=== Players in ===
Player	From	Fee
(Scotland) Scott Taggart	(Scotland) Morton	Free
(Scotland) David van Zanten	(Scotland) St Mirren	Free
(Scotland) Lee Mair	(Scotland) Partick Thistle	Free
(Scotland) Archie Campbell	(Scotland) Morton	Free
(Republic of Ireland) Danny Rogers	(Scotland) Aberdeen	Loan
(Scotland) Kieran MacDonald	(Scotland) Hamilton	Loan
(Scotland) Chris Kane	(Scotland) St Johnstone	Loan
(Scotland) Stuart Findlay	(Scotland) Celtic	Loan
(Scotland) Dylan Easton	(Scotland) St Johnstone	Loan
(Scotland) Darren Petrie	(Scotland) Dundee United	Loan
(Scotland) Mark Wilson	(Scotland) Dundee United	Free
(Scotland) Chris Duggan	(Scotland) Partick Thistle	Loan

=== Players out ===
Player	To	Fee
(Scotland) Owen Ronald	Free agent	Free
(Scotland) Nick Phinn	Free agent	Free
(Scotland) Scott Smith	Free agent	Free
(Scotland) Paul McGinn	(Scotland) Dundee	Free
(Scotland) Bryan Prunty	(Scotland) Airdrie	Free
(Scotland) Hugh Murray	(Scotland) Clyde	Free
(Scotland) Steven McDougall	(Scotland) Clyde	Free
(Scotland) Mark McLaughlin	Free agent	Free
(Scotland) Colin Nish	(Scotland) Cowdenbeath	Free
(Scotland) Kevin Smith	(Scotland) East Fife	Free

== See also ==
- List of Dumbarton F.C. seasons
