= 2015–16 Dumbarton F.C. season =

Dumbarton
2015–16 season
- Chairman: Alan Jardine
- Manager: Stevie Aitken
- Stadium: Dumbarton Football Stadium
- Championship: 8th
- Challenge Cup: Second round
- League Cup: First round
- Scottish Cup: Fifth round
Home colours	Away colours

The 2015–16 season was Dumbarton's fourth consecutive season back in the second tier of Scottish football and their third season in the Scottish Championship, having won promotion from the Scottish Second Division at the end of the 2011–12 season via the play-offs. Ian Murray resigned as manager before the start of the season and moved to Championship rivals St Mirren and was replaced by Stephen Aitken.

Dumbarton finished eighth in the Scottish Championship. They reached the second round in the Challenge Cup before losing to Queens Park, lost in the first round of the League Cup to East Fife and the fifth round of the Scottish Cup to Dundee, following a drawn game.

== Results & fixtures ==
Win Draw Loss Abandoned or Postponed

=== Scottish Championship ===
8 August 2015 Championship	Dumbarton	2–1	Hibernian	Dumbarton Football Stadium
15:00	Buchanan 3'; Gibson 55'	BBC Report	Malonga 14'	Attendance: 1,552; Referee: Robertson

15 August 2015 Championship	St Mirren	1–2	Dumbarton	St Mirren Park
15:00	Agnew 63'	BBC Report	Gibson 26'; Fleming 85' (pen.)	Attendance: 3,806; Referee: Beaton

22 August 2015 Championship	Dumbarton	0–2	Queen of the South	Dumbarton Football Stadium
15:00		BBC Report	Russell 41'; Lyle 68'	Attendance: 943; Referee: Colvin

28 August 2015 Championship	Falkirk	2–1	Dumbarton	Falkirk Stadium
19:45	Alston 5'; Sibbald 14'	BBC Report	Barr 27'	Attendance: 3,600; Referee: Cook

5 September 2015 Championship	Dumbarton	0–2	Alloa Athletic	Dumbarton Football Stadium
15:00		BBC Report	Holmes 59'; Ferns 90+3'	Attendance: 715; Referee: Charleston

12 September 2015 Championship	Greenock Morton	0–0	Dumbarton	Cappielow
15:00		BBC Report		Attendance: 2,016; Referee: Finnie

19 September 2015 Championship	Dumbarton	1–2	Rangers	Dumbarton Football Stadium
15:00	Fleming 90' (pen.); Buchanan (red card) 72'	BBC Report	Waghorn 64', 73' (pen.)	Attendance: 1,572; Referee: Robertson

26 September 2015 Championship	Raith Rovers	1–0	Dumbarton	Stark's Park
15:00	Toshney 56'	BBC Report		Attendance: 1,440; Referee: Cook

3 October 2015 Championship	Dumbarton	2–1	Livingston	Dumbarton Football Stadium
15:00	Cawley 40'; Brophy 82'	BBC Report	Glen 44'; Hippolyte (red card) 45'	Attendance: 819; Referee: Walsh

17 October 2015 Championship	Hibernian	4–2	Dumbarton	Easter Road
15:00	Malonga 21'; Fontaine 26'; Cummings 43' (pen.); Keatings 60'	BBC Report	Gallagher 22'; Craig 74'	Attendance: 8,221; Referee: Colvin

24 October 2015 Championship	Dumbarton	0–5	Falkirk	Dumbarton Football Stadium
15:00		BBC Report	Baird 5', 23', 48'; McHugh 43'; Alston 71'	Attendance: 963; Referee: Collum

31 October 2015 Championship	Dumbarton	1–2	Greenock Morton	Dumbarton Football Stadium
15:00	Barr 53'	BBC Report	McKee 41'; Johnstone 85'	Attendance: 1,110; Referee: Salmond

7 November 2015 Championship	Queen of the South	1–0	Dumbarton	Palmerston Park
15:00	Heffernan 52'	BBC Report		Attendance: 1,465; Referee: Muir

21 November 2015 Championship	Dumbarton	3–3	Raith Rovers	Dumbarton Football Stadium
15:00	Saunders 81', 83'; Fleming 87' (pen.)	BBC Report	Craigen 4'; Stewart 44'; S.Robertson 56'	Attendance: 707; Referee: Aitken

1 December 2015 Championship	Rangers	4–0	Dumbarton	Ibrox Stadium
19:45	Holt 47'; Waghorn 60'; Oduwa 81'; Halliday 88' (pen.)	Report	Saunders (yellow card) 17' (red card) 87'	Attendance: 37,182; Referee: (Scotland) Crawford Allan

5 December 2015 Championship	Alloa Athletic	0–2	Dumbarton	Recreation Park, Alloa
15:00		Report	Docherty 68'; Gallagher 84'	Attendance: 492; Referee: Willie Collum

12 December 2015 Championship	Dumbarton	1–0	St Mirren	Dumbarton Football Stadium
15:00	Fleming 50'	Report		Attendance: 1,142; Referee: Nick Walsh

19 December 2015 Championship	Livingston	1–1	Dumbarton	Almondvale Stadium
15:00	Pittman 14'	Report	Saunders 89'	Attendance: 911; Referee: Mat Northcroft

26 December 2015 Championship	Falkirk	1–0	Dumbarton	Falkirk Stadium
15:00	Alston 36'	Report		Attendance: 4,013; Referee: Euan Anderson

2 January 2016 Championship	Dumbarton	0–6	Rangers	Dumbarton Football Stadium
15:00		SPFL Report	Miller 42', 59', 64'; Waghorn 71'; Halliday 81'; Tavernier 88'	Attendance: 1,894; Referee: Craig Charleston

23 January 2016 Championship	Raith Rovers	0–0	Dumbarton	Stark's Park
15:00		SPFL Report		Attendance: 1,397; Referee: Stephen Finnie

30 January 2016 Championship	Dumbarton	1–0	Livingston	Dumbarton Football Stadium
15:00	Docherty 56'	SPFL Report		Attendance: 760; Referee: Crawford Allan

13 February 2016 Championship	Greenock Morton	2–0	Dumbarton	Cappielow
15:00	Johnstone 64'; McKee 88'	SPFL Report		Attendance: 1,595; Referee: George Salmond

20 February 2016 Championship	St Mirren	1–0	Dumbarton	St Mirren Park
15:00	Shankland 63'	SPFL Report		Attendance: 2,792; Referee: Beaton

27 February 2016 Championship	Dumbarton	3–2	Hibernian	Dumbarton Football Stadium
15:00	Cawley 21'; Nade 42'; Barr 49'	SPFL Report	Henderson 57'; El Alagui 71'	Attendance: 1,345; Referee: Barry Cook

5 March 2016 Championship	Livingston	2–0	Dumbarton	Almondvale Stadium
15:00	Buchanan 29'; White 83'	SPFL Report		Attendance: 828; Referee: Don Robertson

8 March 2016 Championship	Dumbarton	3–1	Alloa Athletic	Dumbarton Football Stadium
19:45	Nade 9', 32', 46'	SPFL Report	Megginson 31'	Attendance: 468; Referee: Willie Collum

12 March 2016 Championship	Dumbarton	1–1	Falkirk	Dumbarton Football Stadium
17:15	Fleming 90+3' (pen.)	SPFL Report	Baird 65' (pen.)	Attendance: 734; Referee: Andrew Dallas

19 March 2016 Championship	Queen of the South	6–0	Dumbarton	Palmerston Park
15:00	Brownlie 34'; Lyle 43', 52'; Harris 69', 73'; Russell 88'	SPFL Report		Attendance: 1,459; Referee: John Beaton

2 April 2016 Championship	Dumbarton	0–0	Greenock Morton	Dumbarton Football Stadium
15:00		SPFL Report		Attendance: 994; Referee: Crawford Allan

5 April 2016 Championship	Rangers	1–0	Dumbarton	Ibrox Stadium
19:45	Tavernier 50'	SPFL Report		Attendance: 48,568; Referee: Steven McLean

12 April 2016 Championship	Dumbarton	4–2	Queen of the South	Dumbarton Football Stadium
19:45	Nade 4', 50'; Walsh 48'; Fleming 86' (pen.)	SPFL Report	Russell 28'; Harris 43'	Attendance: 573; Referee: Stephen Finnie

16 April 2016 Championship	Dumbarton	2–3	Raith Rovers	Dumbarton Football Stadium
15:00	Nade 12'; Saunders 90+3'	SPFL Report	Hardie 49'; Connolly 60'; Craigen 70'	Attendance: 655; Referee: Nick Walsh

23 April 2016 Championship	Dumbarton	2–1	St Mirren	Dumbarton Football Stadium
15:00	OG 40'; Fleming 54'	SPFL Report	Gallagher 10'	Attendance: 1,387; Referee: Kevin Graham

26 April 2016 Championship	Hibernian	4–0	Dumbarton	Easter Road
17:45	Keatings 7', 13'; OG 75'; Stokes 90+2'	SPFL Report		Attendance: 6,686; Referee: Don Robertson

1 May 2016 Championship	Alloa Athletic	1–1	Dumbarton	Recreation Park, Alloa
12:30	Layne 7'	SPFL Report	McCallum 51'	Attendance: 515; Referee: Barry Cook

=== Scottish Cup ===
28 November 2015 Round 3	Dumbarton	P–P	Alloa Athletic	Dumbarton Football Stadium
15:00		BBC Report
Note: Postponed due to waterlogged pitch

8 December 2015 Round 3	Dumbarton	5–0	Alloa Athletic	Dumbarton Football Stadium
19:30	McCallum 1'; Barr (yellow card) 9'; Fleming 14'; Kirkpatrick 78' 90+2'; Waters 90'	Report	Flannigan (yellow card) 53'; Chopra (yellow card) 72'	Attendance: 274; Referee: (Scotland) Stephen Finnie

9 January 2016 Round 4	Dumbarton	2–1	Queen of the South	Dumbarton Football Stadium
15:00	Saunders (yellow card) 15'; Fleming 17' 57'; Waters (yellow card) 68'	Report	Lyle 52'	Attendance: 680; Referee: (Scotland) George Salmond

6 February 2016 Round 5	Dumbarton	0–0	Dundee	Dumbarton Football Stadium
15:00	Routledge (yellow card) 79'	Report	O'Dea (yellow card) 85'	Attendance: 1,410; Referee: (Scotland) Stephen Finnie

23 February 2016 Round 5 Replay	Dundee	5–0	Dumbarton	Dens Park
19:45	McGinn 16'; Hemmings 29'; Stewart 51', 90'; Holt 79'	BBC Report		Attendance: 3,532; Referee: (Scotland) Stephen Finnie

=== Scottish Challenge Cup ===
25 July 2015 Round 1	Greenock Morton	2–3	Dumbarton	Cappielow
15:00	Kilday 73'; MacDonald 83' (pen.)	BBC Report	Gallagher 6', 30'; Fleming 65'	Attendance: 1,418; Referee: Charleston

18 August 2015 Round 2	Queen's Park	1–0 (a.e.t.)	Dumbarton	Hampden Park
19:45	Bradley 95'	BBC Report		Attendance: 587; Referee: Walsh

=== League Cup ===
1 August 2015 First round	East Fife	1–1 (4–3 p)	Dumbarton	Bayview Stadium
15:00	Austin 48'	BBC Report	Cawley 65'	Attendance: 461; Referee: Kirkland
	Penalties
	Mullan (penalty scored); Naismith (penalty scored); Walker (penalty missed); Sutherland (penalty missed); Slattery (penalty scored); O'Kane (penalty scored)		(penalty scored) Taggart; (penalty scored) Gallagher; (penalty scored) Graham; (penalty missed) Craig; (penalty missed) Gibson; (penalty missed) Cawley

=== Stirlingshire Cup ===
18 April 2015 Semi Final	East Stirling	0 – 0	Dumbarton	Ochilview Park
20:00

=== Pre Season Matches ===
4 July 2015 Friendly	Edinburgh City	0–1	Dumbarton	Ainslie Park
15:00		DFC Report	Gibson 67'

9 July 2015 Friendly	Dumbarton	2–0	Hearts	Dumbarton Football Stadium
19:45	Gallagher; Cawley	DFC Report		Attendance: 347; Referee: Alan Muir

11 July 2015 Friendly	Partick Thistle	3–2	Dumbarton	Firhill
	Goal		Barr

14 July 2015 Friendly	Stranraer	3–1	Dumbarton	Stair Park
	Goal		Buchanan

18 July 2015 Friendly	Dumbarton	2–1	Clydebank	Dumbarton Football Stadium
15:00	Buchanan; Fleming	DFC Report	Burbidge	Attendance: 366; Referee: Grant Irvine

== Player statistics ==
=== Squad ===
Last updated 25 August 2016

No.	Pos	Nat	Player	Total		Scottish Championship		Challenge Cup		League Cup		Scottish Cup	
No.	Pos	Nat	Player	Apps	Goals	Apps	Goals	Apps	Goals	Apps	Goals	Apps	Goals
	GK	(Scotland) SCO	Mark Brown	27	0	21+0	0	2+0	0	1+0	0	3+0	0
	GK	(Scotland) SCO	Jamie Ewings	16	0	15+0	0	0+0	0	0+0	0	1+0	0
	DF	(Scotland) SCO	Darren Barr	36	3	30+1	3	1+0	0	1+0	0	3+0	0
	DF	(Scotland) SCO	Gregor Buchanan	37	1	29+1	1	2+0	0	1+0	0	4+0	0
	DF	(Scotland) SCO	Mark Docherty	39	2	31+3	2	0+1	0	0+0	0	4+0	0
	DF	(Scotland) SCO	Andy Graham	4	0	1+1	0	1+0	0	0+1	0	0+0	0
	DF	(Scotland) SCO	Steven Saunders	26	4	24+0	4	0+0	0	0+0	0	2+0	0
	DF	(Scotland) SCO	Scott Taggart	20	0	9+5	0	2+0	0	1+0	0	1+2	0
	DF	(Scotland) SCO	Calum Waters	21	1	9+7	0	2+0	0	1+0	0	1+1	1
	DF	(Scotland) SCO	Frazer Wright	31	0	26+1	0	0+0	0	0+0	0	4+0	0
	MF	(Scotland) SCO	Scott Brown	16	0	12+4	0	0+0	0	0+0	0	0+0	0
	MF	(Scotland) SCO	Ryan Clark	0	0	0+0	0	0+0	0	0+0	0	0+0	0
	MF	(Scotland) SCO	Grant Gallagher	37	4	24+7	2	2+0	2	1+0	0	3+0	0
	MF	(Scotland) SCO	Willie Gibson	21	2	13+5	2	1+1	0	1+0	0	0+0	0
	MF	(Scotland) SCO	Mikey Hopkins	1	0	0+0	0	0+0	0	0+0	0	0+1	0
	MF	(Scotland) SCO	Jordan Kirkpatrick	27	2	7+15	0	1+0	0	0+1	0	1+2	2
	MF	(Scotland) SCO	Jamie Lindsay	28	0	20+3	0	1+0	0	1+0	0	2+1	0
	MF	(Scotland) SCO	Donald McCallum	16	2	3+12	1	0+0	0	0+0	0	1+0	1
	MF	(England) ENG	Jon Routledge	38	0	30+1	0	2+0	0	1+0	0	4+0	0
	FW	(Scotland) SCO	Eamonn Brophy	10	1	5+5	1	0+0	0	0+0	0	0+0	0
	FW	(Scotland) SCO	Kevin Cawley	39	3	25+7	2	2+0	0	1+0	1	2+2	0
	FW	(Scotland) SCO	Steven Craig	14	1	7+4	1	0+1	0	0+1	0	0+1	0
	FW	(Scotland) SCO	Garry Fleming	42	11	30+5	7	2+0	1	1+0	0	3+1	3
	FW	(Ireland) EIR	Paul Heffernan	8	0	4+4	0	0+0	0	0+0	0	0+0	0
	FW	(Thailand) THA	Kler Heh	5	0	0+4	0	0+0	0	0+0	0	1+0	0
	FW	(France) FRA	Christian Nade	14	7	10+2	7	0+0	0	0+0	0	2+0	0
	FW	(Scotland) SCO	Steven Ross	5	0	1+4	0	0+0	0	0+0	0	0+0	0
	FW	(Scotland) SCO	Gordon Smith	4	0	0+2	0	1+1	0	0+0	0	0+0	0
	FW	(Scotland) SCO	Tom Walsh	16	1	10+4	1	0+0	0	0+0	0	2+0	0

== Team statistics ==
=== League table ===
Pos	Team	Pld	W	D	L	GF	GA	GD	Pts	Promotion, qualification or relegation
6	St Mirren	36	11	9	16	44	53	−9	42	
7	Queen of the South	36	12	6	18	46	56	−10	42	
8	Dumbarton	36	10	7	19	35	66	−31	37	
9	Livingston (R)	36	8	7	21	37	51	−14	31	Qualification for the Championship play-offs
10	Alloa Athletic (R)	36	4	9	23	22	67	−45	21	Relegation to League One

Source: Soccerway
Rules for classification: 1) Points; 2) Goal difference; 3) Number of goals scored
(R) Relegated

=== Division summary ===
Round	1	2	3	4	5	6	7	8	9	10	11	12	13	14	15	16	17	18	19	20	21	22	23	24	25	26	27	28	29	30	31	32	33	34	35	36
Ground	H	A	H	A	H	A	H	A	H	A	H	H	A	H	A	A	H	A	A	H	A	H	A	A	H	A	H	H	A	H	A	H	H	H	A	A
Result	W	W	L	L	L	D	L	L	W	L	L	L	L	D	L	W	W	D	L	L	D	W	L	L	W	L	W	D	L	D	L	W	L	W	L	D
Position	4	2	5	5	7	7	7	7	7	8	8	9	9	9	9	7	7	7	7	8	7	7	8	8	8	8	8	8	8	8	8	8	8	8	8	8

Updated to match(es) played on 25 August 2016. Source:
A = Away; H = Home; W = Win; D = Draw; L = Loss

== Transfers ==
=== Players in ===
Player	From	Fee
(Scotland) Gregor Buchanan	(Scotland) Dunfermline Athletic	Free
(Scotland) Grant Gallagher	(Scotland) Stranraer	Free
(Scotland) Kevin Cawley	(Scotland) Alloa Athletic	Free
(Scotland) Darren Miller	(Scotland) Queen's Park	Free
(Scotland) Mark Docherty	(Scotland) Alloa Athletic	Free
(Scotland) Mark Brown	(Scotland) Ross County	Free
(Scotland) Willie Gibson	(Scotland) Stranraer	Free
(Scotland) Gordon Smith	(Scotland) Stirling Albion	Free
(Scotland) Darren Barr	(Scotland) Ross County	Free
(England) Jon Routledge	(Scotland) Hamilton Academical	Free
(Scotland) Calum Waters	(Scotland) Celtic	Loan
(Scotland) Steven Craig	(England) Wycombe Wanderers	Free
(Scotland) Jamie Lindsay	(Scotland) Celtic	Loan
(Scotland) Scott Brown	(Scotland) St Johnstone	Loan
(Scotland) Frazer Wright	(Scotland) St Johnstone	Free
(Scotland) Steven Ross	(Scotland) Ross County	Free
(Scotland) Eamonn Brophy	(Scotland) Hamilton	Loan
(Scotland) Steven Saunders	(Scotland) Ross County	Free
(Scotland) Tom Walsh	(Scotland) Rangers	Loan
(Thailand) Kler Heh	(England) Sheffield United	Loan
(France) Christian Nade	(Scotland) Hamilton	Free
(Republic of Ireland) Paul Heffernan	(Scotland) Queen of the South	Free

=== Players out ===
Player	To	Fee
(Scotland) Archie Campbell	(Scotland) Clyde	Free
(Scotland) Scott Linton	(Scotland) Clyde	Free
(Scotland) Mitchel Megginson	(Scotland) Raith Rovers	Free
(Scotland) Lee Mair	(Scotland) Stranraer	Free
(Scotland) Stephen Grindlay	(Scotland) Beith Juniors	Free
(Scotland) Joe Coleman		Free
(Northern Ireland) Chris Turner	(Scotland) Hamilton Academical	Free
(Scotland) Mark Gilhaney	(Scotland) Stenhousemuir	Free
(Republic of Ireland) David van Zanten	(Scotland) Airdrieonians	Free
(Scotland) Scott Agnew	(Scotland) St Mirren	Free
(Scotland) Andy Graham	(Scotland) Ayr United	Free
(Scotland) Darren Miller		Free
(Scotland) Gordon Smith	(Scotland) Cowdenbeath	Loan
(England) Josh Lumsden	(Scotland) Clydebank	Free
(Scotland) Mark Wilson		Free
(Scotland) Kjeld McIntyre		Free
(Scotland) Willie Gibson	(Scotland) Stranraer	Free
(Scotland) Gordon Smith		Free
(Scotland) Ryan Clark	(Scotland) Arthurlie	Loan
(Scotland) Steven Craig		Free
(Scotland) Jordan Kirkpatrick	(Scotland) Clyde	Loan

== Factfile ==
* The 9 league goals scored in away games matched the record fewest away goals scored set during the 1894–95 season.

== See also ==
- List of Dumbarton F.C. seasons
