= Lyden (surname) =

Lyden is a surname. Notable people with the surname include:

- Jacki Lyden (born 1953 or 1954), American news reporter
- Jordan Lyden (born 1996), Australian footballer
- Mitch Lyden (born 1964), American baseball player
- Pierce Lyden (1908–1998), American actor
- Robert Lyden (1942–1986), American actor
- Ross Lyden (born 2000), Scottish footballer
