= Robert Thomson (footballer, born 1993) =

Scottish footballer (born 1993)

Personal information
- Date of birth: 28 May 1993 (age 33)
- Place of birth: Paisley, Scotland
- Height: 6 ft 2 in (1.88 m)
- Position: Forward

Team information
- Current team: Gartcairn Juniors

Youth career
- 2004–2012: Dundee United

Senior career*
Years	Team	Apps	(Gls)
2012–2013	Dundee United	2	(0)
2012	→ Alloa Athletic (loan)	14	(4)
2013	Dunfermline Athletic	9	(1)
2014–2016	Brechin City	80	(29)
2016–2017	Dumbarton	36	(11)
2017–2019	Greenock Morton	38	(4)
2019–2021	Alloa Athletic	39	(4)
2021–2022	Stenhousemuir	25	(4)
2022–2024	Stirling Albion	47	(10)
2024	East Kilbride	10	(6)
2024–	Gartcairn Juniors		
- * Club domestic league appearances and goals as of 3 August 2024

Robert Thomson (born 28 May 1993) is a Scottish footballer who plays as a forward for West of Scotland League First Division club Gartcairn Juniors. He has previously played for Dundee United, Alloa Athletic, Dunfermline Athletic, Brechin City, Dumbarton, Greenock Morton, Stenhousemuir, Stirling Albion and East Kilbride.

== Career ==
=== Dundee United ===
Born in Paisley, Thomson spent the majority of his youth career as an academy player with Scottish Premier League side Dundee United. After spending time on loan at Alloa in 2012–13, Thomson returned to Dundee United and made his official first-team debut in the Scottish Premier League on 9 March 2013, against St Mirren coming on as a substitute in the 68th minute for Rory Boulding as Dundee United drew the match 0–0.

==== Alloa Athletic loan ====
On 11 August 2012, it was officially confirmed that Thomson had signed with Scottish Second Division side Alloa Athletic on loan till 1 January 2013. Thomson then made his debut for Alloa Athletic that same day, in a 1–1 draw against East Fife as a substitute for Mark Docherty. In the following game, on 18 August 2012, he scored the first professional goals of his career, with a brace against Albion Rovers in the 79th and 83rd minutes of the match to give Alloa Athletic a 3–0 away victory. Thomson then scored two further goals for Alloa, on 1 September 2012 in a 3–1 win against Brechin City and then on 15 December 2012, against Stranraer in a 3–2 defeat.

=== Dunfermline Athletic ===
On 30 August 2013, Thomson signed for Dunfermline Athletic on a contract running until the end of December 2013. He made his debut the following day in a 3–1 win against Stranraer. On 14 September 2013, he scored what turned out to be his only goal for Dunfermline in a 1–1 draw against Brechin City.

=== Brechin City ===
On 27 January 2014, Thomson signed for Brechin City until the end of the season. He scored 15 goals in the 2015–16 season and won the Scottish League One Player of the Month for April a month in which he scored his first senior hat-trick in a 5–1 victory over Peterhead.

=== Dumbarton ===
In May 2016, Thomson signed for Scottish Championship club Dumbarton. He scored his first goal for the club in a 3–3 draw with Peterhead in July 2016. He scored the Sons 500th goal at the Cheaper Insurance Direct Stadium in March 2017, with the first of a double against Raith Rovers in a 4–0 victory.

=== Greenock Morton ===
After impressing Greenock Morton manager Jim Duffy with displays against his side, Thomson signed a pre-contract agreement for a two-year deal with the Cappielow club on 9 February 2017, with the move taking place during the summer of 2017.

=== Alloa Athletic ===
On 18 June 2019, Thomson rejoined Alloa Athletic on a permanent basis.

=== Stenhousemuir ===
In May 2021, Thomson signed for League Two club Stenhousemuir.

=== Stirling Albion ===
In May 2022, Thomson signed for Scottish League Two side Stirling Albion.

== Career statistics ==
As of match played 30 April 2022

Appearances and goals by club, season and competition
Club	Season	League			Scottish Cup		League Cup		Other		Total	
Club	Season	Division	Apps	Goals	Apps	Goals	Apps	Goals	Apps	Goals	Apps	Goals
Dundee United	2012–13	Scottish Premier League	2	0	0	0	0	0	0	0	2	0
Alloa Athletic (loan)	2012–13	Scottish Second Division	14	4	1	0	0	0	0	0	15	4
Dunfermline Athletic	2013–14	Scottish League One	9	1	0	0	0	0	0	0	9	1
Brechin City	2013–14	Scottish League One	14	7	0	0	0	0	0	0	14	7
Brechin City	2014–15	Scottish League One	34	7	4	0	1	0	4 (Note: Two appearances and a goal in the Scottish Challenge Cup, two appearances in the Championship play-offs)	1	43	8
Brechin City	2015–16	Scottish League One	32	15	1	0	1	0	1 (Note: Appearances in the Scottish Challenge Cup)	0	35	15
Brechin City	Total		80	29	5	0	2	0	5	1	92	30
Dumbarton	2016–17	Scottish Championship	36	11	2	0	4	1	1	0	43	12
Greenock Morton	2017–18	Scottish Championship	25	4	0	0	3	2	1	0	29	6
Greenock Morton	2018–19	Scottish Championship	13	0	3	1	0	0	1	0	17	1
Greenock Morton	Total		38	4	3	1	3	2	2	0	46	7
Alloa Athletic	2019–20	Scottish Championship	23	1	2	0	1	0	2	1	28	2
Alloa Athletic	2020–21	Scottish Championship	16	3	1	0	5	3	0	0	22	6
Alloa Athletic	Total		39	4	3	0	6	3	2	1	50	8
Stenhousemuir	2021–22	Scottish League Two	25	4	0	0	4	2	2	0	31	6
Stirling Albion	2022–23	Scottish League Two	0	0	0	0	0	0	0	0	0	0
Career total			243	57	14	1	19	8	12	2	288	68
