= Amadou Kassaraté =

English-Senegalese footballer

Personal information
- Date of birth: 14 January 1996 (age 30)
- Place of birth: London, England
- Position: Midfielder

Team information
- Current team: Folkestone Invicta

Youth career
- Tottenham Hotspur
- –2015: Welling United

Senior career*
Years	Team	Apps	(Gls)
2015	Walton Casuals		
2016–2017	Dumbarton	0	(0)
2016–2017	→ Kirkintilloch Rob Roy (loan)		
2017	→ Stranraer (loan)	13	(2)
2017-2018	Cheshunt	10	(1)
2018–2019	Thesprotos	15	(4)
2019–2020	Cheshunt	18	(3)
2021–2022	Cheshunt	29	(6)
2022–2023	Welling United	52	(1)
2023–2024	Bishop's Stortford	21	(2)
2024–	Folkestone Invicta	1	(0)

International career
2015	Senegal U20	2	(0)
- * Club domestic league appearances and goals as of 11:25, 26 August 2024 (UTC)

Amadou Kassaraté (born 14 January 1996) is an English footballer who plays as a midfielder for National League South club Folkestone Invicta. He is also eligible to play for the Senegal national football team, on account of his parents' birth in Senegal.

== Early life and education ==
Amadou Kassaraté was born on 14 January 1996 in London, England, to Senegalese parents.

He attended Thomas Tallis Secondary School.

== Career ==
After starting his career with Welling United, Kassarate joined Walton Casuals in February 2015. However, he failed to make an appearance for the Isthmian Division One South club and left at the end of the season.

In December 2015, he joined Scottish Championship side Dumbarton's under-20 side. After impressing for them he signed a first team deal in July 2016 alongside fellow under-20s player Ryan Clark, having made his debut as a trialist in a pre-season friendly with Dundee. He made his senior debut for the club as a substitute in a 6–2 defeat to Dundee.

He joined Junior side Kirkintilloch Rob Roy on loan in September 2016.

On 3 February 2017, Kassaraté moved on loan to Scottish League One side Stranraer, joining up with former Dumbarton assistant manager and current Stranraer boss, Stephen Farrell. He scored his first senior goal with a spectacular bicycle kick against Stenhousemuir in April 2017.

On 5 October 2018, Kassaraté joined Greek side Thesprotos. On his second appearance for his new club on 4 November 2018, he scored his first goal, a header in a 3–0 win over Souli Paramythia. He was part of the side who secured promotion to the Greek Football League after winning 3–0 on aggregate in the Gamma Ethniki promotion playoffs.

In November 2019, Kassaraté rejoined Isthmian League Premier Division side Cheshunt. He went on to make 16 appearances in all competitions, scoring three times. In May 2022, he scored in the play-off final to help Cheshunt secure promotion to National League South.

Following a season-and-a-half with Welling United, Kassaraté joined National League North club Bishop's Stortford in December 2023.

In August 2024, Kassaraté joined Isthmian League Premier Division club Folkestone Invicta.

== International career ==
Kassaraté is eligible to play for England, through his birth country and Senegal, through his parents. In April 2015, he was called up by Manager Joseph Koto to play for Senegal under-20s. Kassaraté was expected to be included in the Senegal squad for the FIFA U-20 World Cup, but a foot injury prevented him from joining the squad.

== Personal life ==
Kassaraté is a former student of University of East London where he graduated with a degree in sport and exercise science. He is the founder of urban streetwear clothing brand Sapécomejamais.

== Career statistics ==
=== Club ===
As of match played 7 November 2018

Appearances and goals by club, season and competition
Club	Season	League			Cup		League Cup		Other		Total	
Club	Season	Division	Apps	Goals	Apps	Goals	Apps	Goals	Apps	Goals	Apps	Goals
Dumbarton	2016–17	Scottish Championship	0	0	0	0	2	0	0	0	2	0
Stranraer	2016–17	Scottish League One	13	2	0	0	0	0	0	0	13	2
Scotland total			13	2	0	0	2	0	0	0	15	2
Thesprotos	2018–19	Gamma Ethniki	15	4	0	0	0	0	2 (Note: Appearances in Gamma Ethniki play-offs)	0	17	4
Greece total			15	4	0	0	0	0	2	0	17	4
Career total			28	6	0	0	2	0	2	0	32	6

== Honours ==
Thesprotos

- Gamma Ethniki play-off winner: 2018-19

Cheshunt

- Isthmian League Premier Division play-off winner: 2021–22
