= Jamie Barclay =

Scottish footballer

Personal information
- Full name: Jamie Barclay
- Date of birth: 26 September 1989 (age 37)
- Place of birth: Glasgow, Scotland
- Position: Goalkeeper

Team information
- Current team: Irvine Meadow

Youth career
- Celtic
- Falkirk

Senior career*
Years	Team	Apps	(Gls)
2006–2011	Falkirk	0	(0)
2006–2007	→ Partick Thistle (loan)	0	(0)
2008–2010	→ East Stirling (loan)	48	(0)
2011–2012	Berwick Rangers	43	(0)
2012–2015	Clyde	78	(0)
2015–2016	Stenhousemuir	30	(0)
2016	Dumbarton	0	(0)
2016–2020	East Stirlingshire	145	(0)
2020–2022	Kilwinning Rangers	?	(?)
2021	→ Dumbarton (loan)	0	(0)
2022-2023	Cumnock Juniors	?	(?)
2023-	Irvine Meadow	?	(?)

International career
2010	Scotland U21	1	(0)
- * Club domestic league appearances and goals

Jamie Barclay (born 26 September 1989) is a Scottish footballer who plays as a goalkeeper for West of Scotland First Division side Irvine Meadow.

Barclay has previously played for Falkirk, Partick Thistle, Berwick Rangers, Clyde, Stenhousemuir, Dumbarton and East Stirlingshire, He has also played international football for the Scotland U21 side.

At the end of the 2010-11 season, he was released by the club.

In September 2016, Barclay signed for East Stirlingshire, on a short-term deal until the opening of the next transfer window but agreed to remain with the club on 14 December 2016. Barclay was named as club captain in February 2019 after Danny Ashe signed a pre-contract agreement with Lowland League rivals Kelty Hearts.

After 4 years with East Stirlingshire, Barclay decided to leave the club in May 2020 and later signed for Kilwinning Rangers in June. After the West of Scotland Football League season was declared null and void, Barclay joined Dumbarton on an emergency loan in April 2021 - but did not make an appearance for the club.

After two seasons at the Buffs, Barclay left to join rival Premier Division club Cumnock Juniors.

== Honours ==
=== Kilwinning Rangers ===
- Eglinton Cup: Winner 2021-22

=== Cumnock Juniors ===
- Scottish Junior Cup: Winner 2022-23
