= Chris Duggan =

Scottish Australian footballer

Personal information
- Full name: Christopher Duggan
- Date of birth: 30 January 1994 (age 32)
- Place of birth: Perth, Western Australia
- Height: 6 ft 1 in (1.85 m)
- Position: Forward

Team information
- Current team: Port Melbourne

Youth career
- Queen's Park
- 2010–2012: Hamilton Academical

Senior career*
Years	Team	Apps	(Gls)
2013–2016	Partick Thistle	0	(0)
2014	→ Forfar Athletic (loan)	6	(1)
2014	→ Queen's Park (loan)	5	(1)
2015	→ Dumbarton (loan)	7	(0)
2015	→ Queen's Park (loan)	30	(15)
2016–2018	East Fife	58	(22)
2018–2019	Raith Rovers	14	(2)
2019	East Fife	7	(0)
2020–	Port Melbourne	39	(23)
- * Club domestic league appearances and goals as of 3 November 2022

Christopher Duggan (born 30 January 1994) is an Australian professional footballer, who plays as a forward.

== Career ==
Duggan started his career as a player at Queen's Park before moving to Hamilton Academical. He also spent some time playing in the United States. Following an impressive trial at an Irvine Meadow tournament with the jags, newly promoted Scottish Premiership side Partick Thistle signed Duggan in 2013.

After spending some time in Thistle's under 20 squad, Duggan moved to Scottish League One side Forfar Athletic on 21 March 2014, on loan until the end of the 2013–14 season. In March 2014, Duggan scored his first goal for Forfar in a 2–1 defeat to East Fife at Station Park. Duggan returned on loan to Queens Park on loan on 11 September 2014. for three months. Duggan got two assists in his first game back with Queens Park in a 2–1 victory. His loan at Queen's Park came to an end on 1 November 2014, after he had injured his ankle while training with Partick Thistle.

He signed for Dumbarton on an emergency loan until the end of the season in February 2015. Duggan made his debut as a late sub in a 3–0 defeat to Hibernian. He went on to make seven appearances for the club without scoring. Having been released by Partick Thistle, Duggan went on trial with Morton and scored two goals in a friendly against Greenock Juniors. On 21 August 2015, Duggan signed a new one-year contract with Partick Thistle and was immediately loaned to Queen's Park again, moving until 1 January 2016. Duggan helped lead Queens Park to Promotion from League 2, including 2 goals in the playoffs. After his contract with Thistle expired, Duggan signed for East Fife in May 2016.

During the 2018 close season, Duggan signed for Raith Rovers. Duggan was not offered a new contract at the end of an injury prone season and the club did not retain him. He re-signed for East Fife in July 2019, but then left them midway through the 2019–20 as he wanted to move back to Australia.

== Career statistics ==
As of match played 28 October 2017

Appearances and goals by club, season and competition
Club	Season	League			Scottish Cup		League Cup		Other		Total	
Club	Season	Division	Apps	Goals	Apps	Goals	Apps	Goals	Apps	Goals	Apps	Goals
Forfar Athletic (loan)	2013–14	League One	6	1	0	0	0	0	0	0	6	1
Queen's Park (loan)	2014–15	League Two	5	1	0	0	0	0	0	0	5	1
Dumbarton (loan)	2014–15	Championship	7	0	0	0	0	0	0	0	7	0
Queen's Park (loan)	2015–16	League Two	30	12	2	1	0	0	4 (Note: Two appearances and a goal in the Scottish Challenge Cup; two appearances and two goals in the League One play-offs)	3	36	15
East Fife	2016–17	League One	20	7	2	2	2	0	0	0	20	7
East Fife	2017–18	League One	32	14	2	0	4	1	1 (Note: Appearance in the Scottish Challenge Cup)	0	38	15
East Fife	East Fife total		42	21	4	2	6	1	1	0	58	22
Career total			100	35	4	3	6	1	5	3	106	39
