= Mark Docherty (footballer) =

Scottish footballer (born 1988)

Personal information
- Full name: Mark John Docherty
- Date of birth: 15 May 1988 (age 38)
- Place of birth: Bellshill, Scotland
- Height: 1.75 m (5 ft 9 in)
- Positions: Defender; midfielder

Team information
- Current team: Dumbarton (Assistant manager)

Senior career*
Years	Team	Apps	(Gls)
2005–2008	St Mirren	1	(0)
2007	→ Montrose (loan)	9	(1)
2008–2009	Stirling Albion	29	(3)
2009–2011	Brechin City	45	(4)
2011	→ Annan Athletic (loan)	18	(0)
2011–2013	Alloa Athletic	58	(4)
2013–2014	Stranraer	33	(0)
2014–2015	Alloa Athletic	32	(2)
2015–2017	Dumbarton	63	(6)
2017–2019	East Fife	47	(7)
2019–2020	Forfar Athletic	21	(2)
2020	Annan Athletic	22	(0)
2021–2022	Clyde	27	(0)
2022–2023	Edinburgh City	2	(0)
2022–2023	→ Forfar Athletic (loan)	24	(1)
2023–2024	Arthurlie		
2024–2025	East Stirlingshire	44	(8)

Managerial career
- 2025–: Dumbarton (Assistant)
- * Club domestic league appearances and goals as of 14:09, 5 December 2025 (UTC)

Mark John Docherty (born 15 May 1988) is a Scottish former footballer who is currently the assistant manager of Dumbarton. Docherty, who started his career with St Mirren, has since played for Stirling Albion, Brechin City, Alloa Athletic (twice), Stranraer, Dumbarton, East Fife, Montrose, Forfar Athletic (twice), Annan Athletic (twice), Clyde, Edinburgh City Arthurlie and East Stirlingshire.

== Career ==
Born in Bellshill, Docherty began his career with St Mirren and had a loan spell with Montrose in 2007. He made his St Mirren début coming on as a substitute in the 2–0 win over Gretna on 29 March 2008.

He joined Stirling Albion in August 2008, but was released at the end of the 2008–09 season. He then joined Brechin City on a short-term contract and in January 2010 his deal with the club was extended by a further 18-months. On 31 January 2011, he moved to Annan Athletic on loan until the end of the 2010–11 season.

Docherty joined Alloa Athletic in July 2011, helping the club to consecutive promotions before being released in May 2013. He then signed for Stranraer in the summer of 2013. On 29 May 2014, Docherty rejoined Alloa Athletic.

Docherty joined Scottish Championship side Dumbarton in June 2015. He scored his first goal for the club direct from a corner against former club Alloa His second also came direct from a corner in a 1–0 win over Livingston. He renewed his contract in June 2016 for another season He scored the winner from the penalty spot in a 1–0 victory over Dundee United for the Sons in August 2016, his third penalty conversion for the club in two games. He left the club in May 2017

After leaving Dumbarton, Docherty subsequently signed for Scottish League One club East Fife on 13 June 2017. After making over fifty appearances for East Fife, Docherty signed a two-year deal with Forfar Athletic in May 2019. Docherty was released by Forfar in January 2020 and moved to Annan Athletic. He joined Clyde in the summer of 2021, playing 33 times before leaving the club after one season. After spells with Edinburgh City and Forfar Athletic, Docherty joined West of Scotland Football League side Arthurlie in June 2023. He spent a season with the club, which included captaining the club in the 2023–24 Scottish Junior Cup final, before moving to Lowland Football League side East Stirlingshire.

=== Coaching career ===
Docherty returned to former club Dumbarton in December 2025 as assistant to Frank McKeown.

== Career statistics ==
As of match played 30 April 2022

Appearances and goals by club, season and competition
Club	Season	League			Scottish Cup		League Cup		Other		Total	
Club	Season	Division	Apps	Goals	Apps	Goals	Apps	Goals	Apps	Goals	Apps	Goals
Montrose (loan)	2006–07	Third Division	9	1	0	0	0	0	0	0	9	1
St Mirren	2007–08	Premier League	1	0	0	0	0	0	0	0	1	0
Stirling Albion	2008–09	Second Division	29	3	1	0	0	0	0	0	30	3
Brechin City	2009–10	Second Division	35	4	2	1	2	0	4 (Note: Appearances in the First Division play-offs)	0	43	5
Brechin City	2010–11	Second Division	10	0	3	0	2	0	1 (Note: Appearances in the Scottish Challenge Cup)	0	16	0
Brechin City	Brechin City total		45	4	5	1	4	0	5	0	59	5
Annan Athletic (loan)	2010–11	Third Division	18	1	—		—		4 (Note: Appearances in the Second Division play-offs)	0	22	1
Alloa Athletic	2011–12	Third Division	30	4	0	0	1	0	1	0	32	4
Alloa Athletic	2012–13	Second Division	28	0	1	0	1	0	3 (Note: One appearance in the Scottish Challenge Cup and two in the First Division play-offs)	0	33	0
Alloa Athletic	Alloa Athletic total		58	4	1	0	2	0	4	0	65	4
Stranraer	2013–14	League One	32	0	6	0	2	0	4 (Note: Two appearances in the Scottish Challenge Cup and two in the Championship play-offs)	0	44	0
Alloa Athletic	2014–15	Championship	32	2	3	2	2	0	9 (Note: Five appearances in the Scottish Challenge Cup and four in the Championship play-offs)	0	46	4
Dumbarton	2015–16	Championship	34	2	4	0	0	0	1	0	39	2
Dumbarton	2016–17	Championship	29	4	2	0	4	0	1	0	36	4
Dumbarton	Dumbarton total		63	6	6	0	4	0	2	0	75	6
East Fife	2017–18	League One	23	7	1	0	4	1	1	0	29	8
East Fife	2018–19	League One	24	0	3	0	0	0	2	0	29	0
	East Fife total		47	7	4	0	4	1	3	0	58	8
Forfar Athletic	2019–20	League One	21	2	1	0	4	0	1	0	27	3
Annan Athletic	2019–20	League Two	5	0	0	0	0	0	0	0	5	0
Annan Athletic	2020–21	League Two	17	0	1	0	3	1	0	0	21	1
	Annan Athletic total (both spells)		40	1	1	0	3	1	4	0	48	2
Clyde	2021–22	League One	27	0	1	0	4	0	1	0	33	0
Edinburgh City	2022–23	League One	2	0	0	0	2	0	1	0	5	0
Forfar Athletic (loan)	2022–23	League Two	24	1	2	0	0	0	0	0	26	1
Forfar Athletic total (both spells)			45	3	3	0	4	0	1	0	53	3
Career total			430	31	32	3	31	2	34	0	527	36
