= Ross Lyden =

Scottish footballer

Personal information
- Full name: Ross Lyden
- Date of birth: 13 April 2000 (age 26)
- Place of birth: Glasgow, Scotland
- Position: Midfielder

Team information
- Current team: Vale of Leven

Youth career
- 2014–2017: Dumbarton

Senior career*
Years	Team	Apps	(Gls)
2016–2017	Dumbarton	2	(0)
2017–2018	Clydebank		
2018–	Vale of Leven		
- * Club domestic league appearances and goals as of 21:06 14 July 2017 (UTC)

Ross Lyden (born 13 April 2000) is a Scottish footballer who plays as a midfielder for Vale of Leven.

== Career ==
After playing for the club's under-17s side Lyden made his senior debut at the age of 16 in a 2–1 victory for Dumbarton over Queen of the South in December 2016, as an injury time sub for Andy Stirling. In doing so he became the first player born in the 21st century to play for the club. He made his home debut in March, again in place of Stirling, in a 4–0 victory over Raith Rovers. Following the disbanding of Dumbarton's youth system, Lyden signed for Clydebank and, in doing so, became the youngest player to ever agree first team terms with the club. He joined Vale of Leven in July 2018.
