= Craig Pettigrew =

Scottish footballer

Personal information
- Full name: Craig Pettigrew
- Date of birth: 25 November 1986 (age 39)
- Place of birth: Irvine, Scotland
- Height: 6 ft 2 in (1.88 m)
- Position: Centre-back

Team information
- Current team: Glenafton Athletic

Youth career
- –2007: Ayr United

Senior career*
Years	Team	Apps	(Gls)
2007–2008	Ayr United	16	(0)
2008–2014	Auchinleck Talbot	?	(?)
2014–2016	Stranraer	65	(2)
2016–2017	Dumbarton	12	(0)
2017	Stranraer	10	(0)
2017	Auchinleck Talbot	?	(?)
2017–2019	Kilwinning Rangers	?	(?)
2019-2021	Glenafton Athletic	22	(2)
2021	St Cadoc's	?	(?)
2021-	Glenafton Athletic	116	(5)
- * Club domestic league appearances and goals as of 23 July 2024

Craig Pettigrew (born 25 November 1986 in Irvine), is a Scottish footballer who plays as a centre-back for Glenafton Athletic in the West of Scotland Football League. He has previously played for Kilwinning Rangers, Stranraer and Auchinleck Talbot (twice), Dumbarton and Ayr United.

== Career ==
Craig, predominantly a right back and centre-back began his career at Ayr United making 18 appearances. He was released by the club in Summer 2008, and joined Auchinleck Talbot, he spent five years with the West of Scotland Super League Premier Division side winning the Junior Cup three times.

In June 2014 he joined Scottish League One side Stranraer. After two seasons with the Stair Park men he joined Scottish Championship side Dumbarton on a one-year deal, however, he left the club in January 2017 after his contract was cancelled by mutual consent. Shortly after leaving Dumbarton, Pettigrew re-signed for League One side Stranraer. He left the club in May 2017, rejoining Auchinleck a month later. He left Talbot after three months, and joined Kilwinning Rangers. In 2019, Pettigrew signed for Glenafton Athletic, and after a brief spell at St Cadoc's, returned to Glenafton in 2021.
