= Andy Stirling (footballer) =

Scottish footballer (born 1990)

Personal information
- Full name: Andrew Stirling
- Date of birth: 5 March 1990 (age 36)
- Place of birth: Paisley, Scotland
- Height: 1.58 m (5 ft 2 in)
- Position: Midfielder

Team information
- Current team: East Kilbride
- Number: 22

Youth career
- 2006–2009: St Mirren

Senior career*
Years	Team	Apps	(Gls)
2009–2011	Stenhousemuir	39	(1)
2011–2013	East Stirlingshire	55	(9)
2013	Kitsap Pumas	6	(1)
2013–2014	Stranraer	36	(4)
2014–2015	Dunfermline Athletic	15	(2)
2015	→ Stirling Albion (loan)	10	(2)
2015–2016	Stranraer	32	(5)
2016–2017	Dumbarton	34	(3)
2017–2019	Queen of the South	48	(2)
2018	→ Dumbarton (loan)	12	(0)
2019	Alloa Athletic	2	(0)
2019–2021	Stranraer	22	(1)
2021–2023	Darvel		
2023–	East Kilbride	34	(3)
- * Club domestic league appearances and goals as of 14 December 2024

Andy Stirling (born 5 March 1990) is a Scottish footballer who plays as a midfielder for Scottish League One club East Kilbride. Stirling has previously played for Stenhousemuir, East Stirlingshire, Kitsap Pumas, Dunfermline Athletic, Stirling Albion, Dumbarton, Queen of the South, Alloa Athletic, Stranraer F.C and Darvel.

== Career ==
Born in Paisley, Stirling signed a full-time contract with his local club St Mirren at sixteen years old and was released by the Buddies three years later.

Stirling signed for Scottish Second Division club Stenhousemuir and made over 40 appearances in two seasons.

Stirling then moved to local rivals East Stirlingshire. He was with the Shire for two seasons also. During this time, Stirling had a brief spell with Washington state club Kitsap Pumas.

Stirling returned to Scotland in July 2013 and signed for Scottish League One club Stranraer. After an impressive season at Stair Park he was included in the 2013–14 Scottish League One Team of the Year.

Stirling was then given the option to return to full-time football with League One rivals Dunfermline Athletic. In May 2014, Stirling became the Pars manager Jim Jefferies' third signing of the 2014 close season. After 15 appearances for the side, Stirling was sent out on loan to Stirling Albion with manager John Potter confirming the move had been sanctioned to give Stirling more first-team football. After an unsuccessful season with Dunfermline, Stirling was released by the East End Park club.

Stirling signed once again for Stranraer in May 2015. His first appearance after re-signing for the Stair Park club was in a 2–0 defeat versus Queen of the South in the Scottish Challenge Cup. Stirling's first goal for Stranraer was versus Ayr United in August 2015. After just one season with the Blues Stirling again moved on.

Stirling then signed for Scottish Championship club Dumbarton on a one-year contract. He scored his first goal for the Sons in a 1–1 draw versus his first club St Mirren in September 2016.

After impressing during the 2016–17 season against Queen of the South, Stirling signed a pre-contract with the Dumfries club on 24 April 2017, agreeing a two-year deal from the summer of 2017. Stirling scored his first league goal for the Doonhamers on 9 September 2017 in a 2–2 draw away to Livingston.

On 30 January 2018, Stirling returned to the Sons on loan from Queens until the end of the 2017–18 season.

On 19 June 2019, Stirling signed a one-year contract with Alloa Athletic. He left the club on 3 September 2019.

== Career statistics ==
As of 24 August 2019

Appearances and goals by club, season and competition
Club	Season	League			Scottish Cup		League Cup		Other		Total	
Club	Season	Division	Apps	Goals	Apps	Goals	Apps	Goals	Apps	Goals	Apps	Goals
Stenhousemuir	2008–09	Scottish Third Division	4	1	0	0	0	0	0	0	4	1
Stenhousemuir	2009–10	Scottish Second Division	15	0	1	0	1	0	1 (Note: Appearances in the Scottish Challenge Cup)	0	18	0
Stenhousemuir	2010–11	Scottish Second Division	20	0	1	1	1	0	1	0	23	1
Stenhousemuir	Total		39	1	2	1	2	0	2	0	45	2
East Stirlingshire	2011–12	Scottish Third Division	35	5	3	2	1	0	1	0	40	7
East Stirlingshire	2012–13	Scottish Third Division	20	4	0	0	0	0	0	0	20	4
East Stirlingshire	Total		55	9	3	2	1	0	1	0	60	11
Kitsap Pumas	2013	PDL Northwest Division	6	1	0	0	0	0	0	0	6	1
Stranraer	2013–14	Scottish League One	36	4	6	1	1	0	3 (Note: One appearance in the Scottish Challenge Cup and two appearances in the Championship play-offs)	0	46	5
Dunfermline Athletic	2014–15	Scottish League One	15	2	2	0	1	0	0	0	18	2
Stirling Albion (loan)	2014–15	Scottish League One	10	2	0	0	0	0	0	0	10	2
Stranraer	2015–16	Scottish League One	32	5	1	0	2	0	5 (Note: One appearance in the Scottish Challenge Cup and four appearances and one goal in the Scottish Championship play-offs)	1	40	6
Dumbarton	2016–17	Scottish Championship	34	3	2	0	4	0	1	0	41	3
Queen of the South	2017–18	Scottish Championship	13	1	2	0	4	0	4	0	23	1
Queen of the South	2018–19	Scottish Championship	35	1	4	0	5	1	6 (Note: Three appearances in the Scottish Challenge Cup and three appearances in the Scottish Championship play-offs)	0	50	2
Queen of the South	Total		48	2	6	0	9	1	10	0	73	3
Dumbarton (loan)	2017–18	Scottish Championship	12	0	0	0	0	0	4 (Note: Appearances in the Scottish Championship play-offs)	0	16	0
Alloa Athletic	2019–20	Scottish Championship	2	0	0	0	3	0	0	0	5	0
Career total			289	29	22	4	23	1	26	1	360	35
