= Frank McKeown =

Scottish footballer

Personal information
- Date of birth: 18 August 1986 (age 40)
- Place of birth: Glasgow, Scotland
- Height: 1.88 m (6 ft 2 in)
- Position: Defender

Senior career*
Years	Team	Apps	(Gls)
2003–2004	Raith Rovers	0	(0)
2004–2005	Partick Thistle	0	(0)
2004-2005	Linlithgow Rose		
2005–2010	Arthurlie	145	(19)
2010–2015	Stranraer	178	(16)
2015–2016	Greenock Morton	0	(0)
2016–2017	Stranraer	11	(0)
2017–2018	Alloa Athletic	16	(0)

Managerial career
- 2025–2026: Dumbarton
- * Club domestic league appearances and goals as of 18:49, 31 May 2021 (UTC)

Frank McKeown (born 18 August 1986) is a Scottish professional footballer and manager who played as a central defender. He has played for Stranraer, Raith, Partick Thistle, Greenock Morton, Alloa Athletic and junior club Arthurlie. McKeown recently managed Scottish League Two side Dumbarton.

== Playing career ==
After being released by Partick Thistle as an 18-year-old, McKeown signed with junior club Linlithgow Rose before moving on to Arthurlie. In 2011, McKeown went senior with Stranraer where he stayed for four years and became club captain in 2013.

In 2015, the opportunity arose to turn full-time with Greenock Morton. He made his debut from the bench in a cup-tie against Elgin City as a late substitute. After less than ten minutes of professional football, McKeown suffered extensive knee ligament damage and was ruled out for at least six months.

McKeown was released by Morton at the end of April 2016, after not recovering from his injury, subsequently returning to Stranraer in June 2016. McKeown made a further 18 appearances for the Blues before departing the club on 11 January 2017, signing for fellow Scottish League One side Alloa Athletic on 13 January 2017. He left the club in May 2018, following their promotion to the Scottish Championship.

== Coaching career ==
McKeown moved into coaching as first team coach at Stranraer in 2019. He was promoted to assistant manager in May 2020 when Chris Aitken left the position to join brother Stephen Aitken at East Kilbride. McKeown left the Blues in May 2021, taking on the same role with Scottish League One club Dumbarton. After four years as assistant to Stephen Farrell, McKeown was appointed Sons manager in December 2025 and signed a two year extension with the club in April 2026 - after leading them to safety in Scottish League Two and their longest unbeaten run in 14 years. McKeown resigned from his position as Dumbarton manager on 14 October 2026.

== Personal life ==
As well as being a part-time footballer until he joined Morton, McKeown worked full-time as a fireman. He was involved in rescue attempts following the 2013 Glasgow helicopter crash, captaining Stranraer in a game against Clyde a few hours later.

== Managerial record ==
As of match played 13 October 2026

Managerial record by team and tenure
Team	From	To	Record				
Team	From	To	P	W	D	L	Win %
Dumbarton	5 December 2025	14 October 2026	43	12	8	23	27.9
Total			43	12	8	23	27.91
