= Ryan Clark (footballer) =

Scottish footballer

Personal information
- Date of birth: 1 August 1997 (age 29)
- Place of birth: Glasgow, Scotland
- Position: Midfielder

Team information
- Current team: Cumbernauld United

Youth career
- –2015: Dumbarton

Senior career*
Years	Team	Apps	(Gls)
2015–2017	Dumbarton	2	(0)
2016	→ Arthurlie (loan)		
2016–2017	→ Kilwinning Rangers (loan)		
2019–	Cumbernauld United		
- * Club domestic league appearances and goals as of 19 January 2019

Ryan Clark (born 1 August 1997) is a Scottish footballer who plays as a midfielder for Cumbernauld United.

== Career ==
Clark began his career at Dumbarton. He was first called up for a Scottish Championship game against Queen of the South on 25 April 2015, replacing Mitch Megginson for the final 14 minutes of a 2–1 away defeat. A week later, in the final game of the season, he played the final two minutes of a 2–2 home draw with Raith Rovers in place of Mark Gilhaney.

He suffered a leg break in a pre-season U20s match against Cumbernauld Colts in August 2015, and joined Arthurlie on loan in January 2016 after recovering.

He signed his first professional deal with the club in July 2016 before joining Kilwinning Rangers on loan in August. Clark joined Cumbernauld United in January 2019.
