= Donald McCallum (footballer, born 1996) =

Scottish footballer

Personal information
- Full name: Donald McCallum
- Date of birth: 27 September 1996 (age 30)
- Place of birth: Campbeltown, Scotland
- Height: 5 ft 9 in (1.75 m)
- Position: Forward

Team information
- Current team: Yoker Athletic FC

Youth career
- 2012–2015: Dumbarton

Senior career*
Years	Team	Apps	(Gls)
2015–2017	Dumbarton	26	(3)
2017	→ Arbroath (loan)	5	(0)
2017–2021	Campbeltown Pupils AFC		
2021-2022	Drumchapel United		
2023–	Yoker Athletic FC		
- * Club domestic league appearances and goals as of 16:06 1 September 2017 (UTC)

Donald McCallum (born 27 September 1996) is a Scottish footballer who plays for Campbeltown Pupils AFC, having played senior for Dumbarton and Arbroath.

== Career ==
Born in Campbeltown, Argyll and Bute, McCallum came through the Dumbarton youth setup and was promoted to the first team in January 2015, wearing the number 15 shirt. He made his first team début as a late substitute in a 5–1 home defeat to Hearts on 10 January. His second appearance came against Livingston where he scored his side's only goal in another 1–5 defeat. He scored his second goal on 25 April 2015, having only been on the park for three minutes, against Queen of the South.

McCallum signed a new one-year deal with Dumbarton in June 2015. He scored on his first start for the club after only 12 seconds in a 5–0 victory over Alloa Athletic in the Scottish Cup, and got his third league goal in a 1–1 draw with the Wasps in April 2016; his performances earned him another year-long contract in June 2016.

On 19 January 2017, McCallum moved on loan to Scottish League Two side Arbroath until the end of the 2016–17 season. After making just five appearances for the Lichties without scoring, he was released by Dumbarton in May 2017. McCallum returned to his hometown of Campbeltown that summer, and joined local Scottish Amateur Football League side Campbeltown Pupils AFC.

== Honours ==
Arbroath

- Scottish League Two (fourth tier): Winners 2016-17
