= Christian Nadé =

French footballer (born 1984)

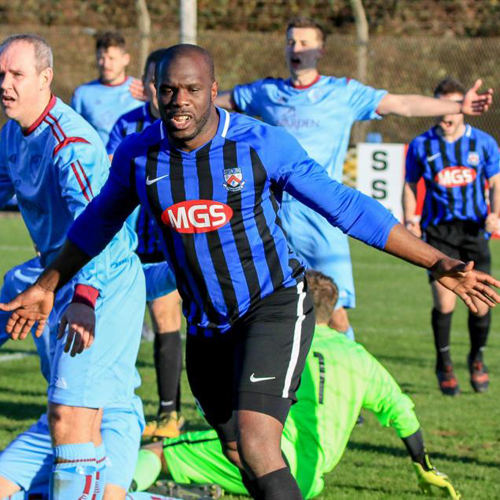
- Nadé after scoring for Troon

Personal information
- Date of birth: 18 September 1984 (age 42)
- Place of birth: Montmorency, France
- Height: 1.82 m (6 ft 0 in)
- Position: Forward

Team information
- Current team: Petershill
- Number: 9

Senior career*
Years	Team	Apps	(Gls)
1999–2006	Troyes AC	48	(7)
2004–2005	→ Le Havre (loan)	17	(1)
2006–2007	Sheffield United	25	(3)
2007–2010	Heart of Midlothian	83	(8)
2010	Alki Larnaca	10	(1)
2011–2013	Samut Songkhram		
2013	PTT Rayong		
2014	Dundee	13	(3)
2014–2015	Raith Rovers	27	(6)
2015–2016	Hamilton Academical	17	(2)
2016	Dumbarton	12	(7)
2016	Stranraer	6	(1)
2016	Annan Athletic (trial)	3	(0)
2016–2018	Dumbarton	35	(4)
2018–2019	Troon	29	(14)
2019–2020	Annan Athletic	35	(7)
2020	Troon	0	(0)
2020–2021	Annbank United	4	(1)
2021	Muirkirk Juniors	10	(5)
2022–2023	Petershill	13	(2)

International career
	France U21	1	(0)
- * Club domestic league appearances and goals as of 25 February 2023

Christian Nadé (born 18 September 1984) is a French professional footballer who plays as a forward for WoSFL Premier Division club Petershill, and is also the head coach of Petershill's under-21 team.

Nadé has played for clubs such as Troyes AC, Le Havre, Sheffield United, Heart of Midlothian and Dundee, and has also represented the France national under-21 football team.

== Early life ==
Nadé was born and grew up in Montmorency, a northern suburb of Paris, France until his parents divorced when he was 13. He moved to England in 2006 at the age of 21.

== Club career ==
=== Troyes ===
Nadé began his career with ES Troyes AC. While with Troyes, he spent a six-month loan spell at Le Havre.

=== Sheffield United ===
Nadé signed a three-year contract for Sheffield United on 27 June 2006 and scored on his debut for the club in a friendly against Rotherham United on 28 July after coming on as substitute for Rob Hulse in the 70th minute. He scored his first competitive goal for the Blades in a League Cup 2nd round tie against Bury at Bramall Lane on 19 September 2006. His first Premiership goal came on 30 December 2006 against Arsenal in a famous 1–0 win. It was the last goal of 2006 in English football. On 16 July 2007 Hull City confirmed that they had agreed a fee with Sheffield United for Nadé, believed to be in the region of £550,000, and were to hold talks with the striker. Due to concerns over his long-term fitness Nadé was offered an incentive-based contract, which he refused and the move subsequently broke down.

=== Heart of Midlothian ===
Nadé signed for SPL outfit Heart of Midlothian in a three-year deal on 31 August 2007. He made his debut on 3 September 2007 in a 2–0 victory over Motherwell at Fir Park and his first league goal came in a 4–2 home win over Falkirk on 6 October 2007. Neil Warnock, Nadé's manager at former club Sheffield United, declared his interest in signing the striker for Crystal Palace in June 2008. His first season with the club was his most prolific as he scored five goals in total. Prior to the 2008–09 season Csaba László was appointed Hearts manager and due to injuries and fitness concerns during pre-season Nadé struggled to break into the starting line up with Jamie Mole being preferred as the lone-striker in László's newly implemented formation. However, after several appearances as a substitute he eventually established himself as first-choice striker and Mole was loaned out to Dunfermline Athletic in January for the remainder of the season. During October 2009, Nadé revealed that his club form had been affected by personal problems off the field. Following a 2–0 defeat to Celtic in February 2010 he was involved in a dressing room bust-up with teammate Ian Black which resulted in the Frenchman being frozen out of the squad for approximately a month. Nadé was released by Hearts at the end of the 2009–10 season. This decision was disputed by Nadé, who claimed he had agreed a new contract with the club.

=== Cyprus and Thailand ===
On 29 July 2010, Nadé signed a three-year contract with the Cypriot side Alki Larnaca.

After a trial with TOT S.C. and Osotspa Saraburi during spring 2011, Nadé signed a contract with Thai Premier League side Samut Songkhram. He was officially unveiled in May 2011. After two years at the club Nadé joined PTT Rayong.

Nadé agreed to sign for Scottish club East Fife in the summer of 2013, but the move collapsed because the club was unable to obtain international clearance for the move. Upon the move breaking down, East Fife's chairman Lee Murray said that he didn't care that the striker's move to East Fife had collapsed and that he "never thought he was that great."

=== Dundee ===
Nadé then signed for another Scottish club, Dundee, in January 2014. Nadé made his debut for Dundee, on 25 January 2014, in a 2–0 loss against Falkirk. After making four appearances, Nadé scored his first goal for the club, as they beat Greenock Morton 2–0 on 1 March 2014. His performances as the Dee won the Championship to return to the top tier made him hugely popular with the Dundee supporters. He scored the first goal as Dundee beat Dumbarton 2–1 at Dens Park in the last game of the season to clinch the title. Despite making an impression at Dundee, Nadé was released upon his expiry of his contract. Although released by the club, Nadé remains optimistic of finding a new club. Nadé also stated he lost weight, quoting: "I'm in better condition than I’ve ever been in my career."

=== Raith Rovers ===
On 17 June 2014, Nadé agreed to sign for Raith Rovers. He scored the winning goal in Raith's 2–1 win over Rangers in the fifth round Scottish Cup tie on 9 February 2015. It was the club's first away win against Rangers since 1959.

=== Hamilton Academical ===
On 13 July 2015, Nadé joined Hamilton alongside Antons Kurakins, Gramoz Kurtaj and Nico Sumsky. He was released by the club in January 2016.

=== Dumbarton ===
Nadé joined Dumbarton on 31 January 2016. His first goal for the club came at home in a 3–2 victory over Hibernian which he celebrated in front of the visiting fans He scored his first career hat-trick in his third league game for the club, a 3–1 win over Alloa on 8 March 2016. In June 2016 Sons' manager Stevie Aitken admitted a deal to keep Nadé at the club was "dead".

=== Stranraer ===
After leaving Dumbarton, Nadé signed for Scottish League One side Stranraer in July 2016.

On 10 November 2016, Nadé was released by Stranraer. After leaving the blues he played as a trialist for Scottish League Two side Annan Athletic

=== Dumbarton return ===
Nadé rejoined Dumbarton on 31 December 2016, and extended his deal until the summer of 2018 in May 2017. He didn't appear again for the club after being charged with a number of criminal offences, which he was later cleared of, and left the club upon expiry of his contract at the end of the season.

=== Troon ===
Nadé joined Junior side Troon in July 2018 after a spell training on his own amidst rumours and controversy surrounding his private life. The Troon management team of Jimmy Kirkwood & Nadé's former Stranraer Coach Matt Maley took a chance on the forward & their belief in him was rewarded with 14 goals in 29 appearances at Troon, which is the most prolific spell of his career to date.

Always keen to return to senior football, Nadé signed for Annan Athletic on the last day of the January transfer window.

=== Annan Athletic ===
Nadé returned to senior football in February 2019, joining Scottish League Two side Annan Athletic.

=== Troon return ===
Nadé re-signed for his former club Troon to play alongside his former Hearts team-mates Ryan Stevenson and Jordan Morton for their debut season in the West of Scotland Football League on 7 July 2020.

=== Annbank United ===
In November 2020, Nadé signed for West of Scotland Football League side Annbank United.

=== Muirkirk Juniors ===
In July 2021, Nadé signed for West of Scotland League side Muirkirk Juniors.

=== Petershill ===
In November 2022, West of Scotland Football League Premier Division side Petershill announced that they had signed Nadé. On 3 December, Nadé scored his first goal for Petershill in their first league victory of the season against Kirkintilloch Rob Roy. His following appearance against Irvine Meadow XI was also notable as Nadé would be sent off just three minutes in, having been shown 2 yellow cards for dissent in the space of 20 seconds.

In June 2023, Nadé was named as the manager for Petershill's under-21 team.

== International career ==
Nadé represented France at Under-21 level, alongside Arsenal forward Jérémie Aliadière, Blackburn Captain Gael Givet, Liverpool strike duo Florent Sinama Pongolle and Anthony Le Tallec, future Manchester United defender Patrice Evra and Barcelona defender Jeremy Mathieu.

== Personal life ==
In October 2018 Nadé revealed that he had tried to commit suicide in 2014 following struggles with depression. In June 2020, he appeared in a special podcast panel discussing his experiences of racism in football with A View from the Terrace host Craig Fowler.

== Career statistics ==
As of 19 May 2020

Appearances and goals by club, season and competition
Club	Season	League			National cup		League cup		Other		Total	
Club	Season	Division	Apps	Goals	Apps	Goals	Apps	Goals	Apps	Goals	Apps	Goals
Troyes	2002–03	Ligue 1	5	1	0	0	0	0	0	0	5	1
Troyes	2003–04	Ligue 2	25	6	1	0	3	0	—		29	6
Troyes	2004–05	Ligue 2	1	0	0	0	0	0	—		1	0
Troyes	2005–06	Ligue 1	17	0	1	1	1	0	—		19	1
Troyes	Total		48	7	2	1	4	0	0	0	54	8
Le Havre (loan)	2004–05	Ligue 2	17	1	1	0	1	0	—		19	1
Sheffield United	2006–07	Premier League	25	3	1	0	2	1	—		28	4
Heart of Midlothian	2007–08	Scottish Premier League	24	4	1	0	2	1	—		27	5
Heart of Midlothian	2008–09	Scottish Premier League	36	2	1	1	1	0	—		38	3
Heart of Midlothian	2009–10	Scottish Premier League	23	2	1	0	2	0	2 (Note: Appearance(s) in UEFA Europa League)	0	28	2
Heart of Midlothian	Total		83	8	3	1	5	1	2	0	93	10
Alki Larnaca	2010–11	Cypriot First Division	10	1	2	2	-	-	-	-	12	3
Dundee FC	2013–14	Scottish Championship	13	3	-	-	-	-	-	-	13	3
Raith Rovers	2014–15	Scottish Championship	27	6	2	1	2	0	-	-	31	7
Hamilton Academical	2015–16	Scottish Premiership	17	2	-	-	1	1	-	-	18	3
Dumbarton	2015–16	Scottish Championship	12	7	2	0	-	-	-	-	14	7
Stranraer	2016–17	Scottish League One	6	1	0	0	4	1	2	0	12	2
Annan Athletic (trial)	2016–17	Scottish League Two	3	0	0	0	0	0	-	-	3	0
Dumbarton	2016–17	Scottish Championship	15	4	0	0	0	0	-	-	15	4
Dumbarton	2017–18	Scottish Championship	20	0	2	0	3	1	3	0	28	1
Annan Athletic	2018–19	Scottish League Two	12	3	0	0	0	0	3	0	15	3
Annan Athletic	2019–20	Scottish League Two	23	4	3	0	4	0	1	0	31	4
Total			331	50	18	5	26	5	11	0	386	60

== Honours ==
Dundee

- Scottish Championship: 2013–14
