= Garry Fleming =

Scottish footballer (born 1987)

Personal information
- Date of birth: 17 May 1987 (age 39)
- Place of birth: Alexandria, Scotland
- Height: 6 ft 2 in (1.88 m)
- Positions: Midfielder; striker

Youth career
- Albion Rovers

Senior career*
Years	Team	Apps	(Gls)
2003–2005	Albion Rovers	10	(1)
2005–2007	Carluke Rovers	?	(?)
2007–2010	Bellshill Athletic	?	(?)
2010–2012	Irvine Meadow	?	(?)
2012–2017	Dumbarton	152	(27)
2017–2018	Alloa Athletic	28	(3)
2018–2020	Kilwinning Rangers	?	(?)
2020–2021	Carluke Rovers	?	(?)
- * Club domestic league appearances and goals as of 16:42, 10 August 2022 (UTC)

Garry Fleming (born 17 May 1987), is a Scottish footballer, predominantly a midfielder or striker.

Fleming, started his career with Albion Rovers, and has also played for Carluke Rovers, Bellshill Athletic, Irvine Meadow, Dumbarton, Alloa Athletic, Kilwinning Rangers.

== Career ==
Garry began his senior career at Albion Rovers before dropping down to the junior game with Carluke Rovers, Bellshill Athletic and then Irvine Meadow. His prolific form with Irvine earned him a move to hometown team Dumbarton, recently promoted to the Scottish First Division, in June 2012. Fleming established himself as a key player in the side often filling in, in defensive midfield and on the wing. At the end of the 2012–13 season, he won the Lennox Herald's 'Rockstar Award'. While at Dumbarton Garry worked as a delivery driver for Scottish owned company Arnold Clark.

In the 2014–15 season he collected the Trust travel and Sonsview Player of the Year awards. and also finished as the club's top goalscorer with six goals. At the end of the season he turned down a move to St Mirren.

He captained Dumbarton for the first time in a 2–1 victory over Hibernian in August 2015. Fleming scored a 25-yard volleyed winner against St Mirren in the club's final home game of the season, a result which kept the club in the Scottish Championship for a further season. It was also his third goal in three games against the Saints.

He won the club's Player of the Year award at the end of the campaign, along with the Players' Player of the Year crown and goal of the season for his volley against St Mirren whilst scoring a career high 11 goals during the season. He renewed his contract at the end of the season

After 179 appearances and 33 goals for the club, he was released in May 2017, signing a one-year deal with Scottish League One side Alloa Athletic on 3 June 2017. After 38 appearances and three goals for the Wasps, he was released in May 2018 following their promotion to the Scottish Championship.

In July 2018, Fleming signed for Kilwinning Rangers.

Carluke Rovers announced the signing of Fleming on 10 December 2020.
