= The Rock, Dumbarton =

Football stadium in Dumbarton, Scotland

The Rock sponsored by Marbill Coaches
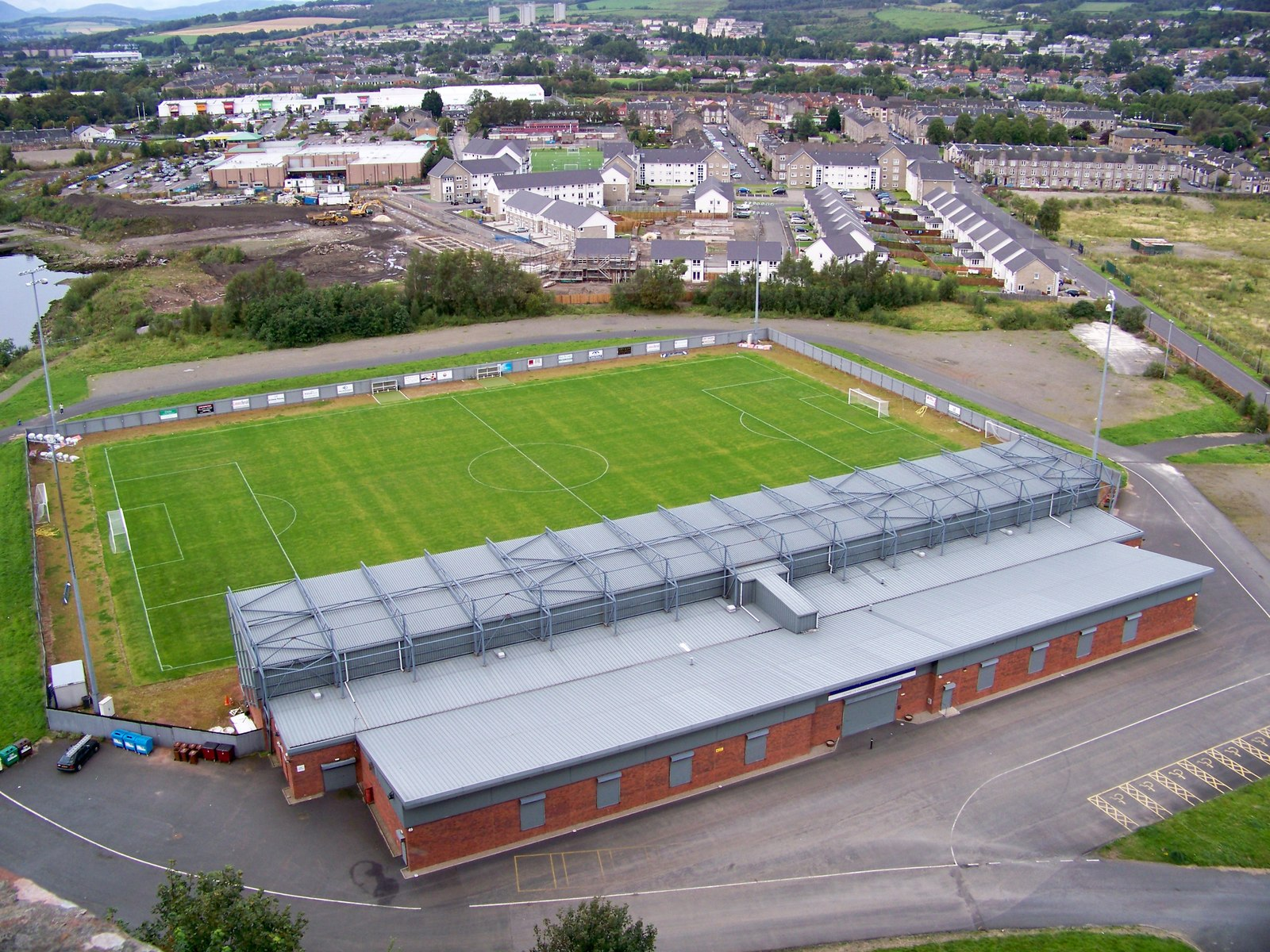
- The stadium seen from Dumbarton Rock

- Location in West Dunbartonshire
- Former names: Strathclyde Homes Stadium (2000–2011); Dumbarton Football Stadium Sponsored By DL Cameron (2012); The Bet Butler Stadium (2012–2014); The Cheaper Insurance Direct Stadium (2015–2017); The YOUR Radio 103FM Stadium (2017–2018); C&G Systems Stadium (2018–2021); Moreroom.com Stadium (2021–2023); The Marbill Coaches Stadium (2024–2026)
- Location: Castle Road; Dumbarton; G82 1JJ
- Coordinates: 55°56′18″N 4°33′41″W
- Owner: Dumbarton F.C.
- Capacity: 2,020
- Surface: Grass (2000–2026) Artificial turf (2026–)

Construction
- Opened: Saturday, 2 December 2000

Tenants
- Dumbarton Football Club (2000–); Broomhill FC (2023–2025)

The Rock, known as The Rock sponsored by Marbill Coaches for sponsorship reasons and formerly known as the Dumbarton Football Stadium, is a stadium in Dumbarton, Scotland, used mostly for football matches; it is the home ground of Dumbarton Football Club. The stadium has a capacity of 2,020, and was built in 2000 after the move away from Dumbarton's former home, Boghead Park. It was built on part of the site formerly occupied by Denny's shipyard. The stadium is 5–10 minutes walk from Dumbarton East railway station on the North Clyde Line. Dumbarton have the fourth smallest stadium in the SPFL.

== History ==
The stadium has just one stand, officially opened on Saturday 2 December 2000 prior to the visit of Elgin City; a match which ended 3–0 to the Sons. It is nicknamed The Rock by fans, as it is adjacent to Dumbarton Castle. Open areas ring the three sides without stands.

The Scotland international team have also used the stadium for training purposes before playing home matches. Celtic have used the stadium for UEFA Youth League home games.

In 2023, Lowland Football League side Broomhill announced a deal to move from Broadwood Stadium in Cumbernauld and play their matches in Dumbarton.

Aside from football the stadium also hosts many other events; wedding receptions, conferences and parties.

On May 6 2026 Dumbarton announced that an artificial pitch would be installed for the first time at the venue, allowing the club's women's team and youth sides to play at the stadium for the first time.

== Names ==
The original name of the stadium, Strathclyde Homes Stadium, changed after the stadium sponsor, Strathclyde Homes, went into receivership in September 2011.

On 18 February 2012, the stadium was officially renamed Dumbarton Football Stadium, sponsored by DL Cameron.

It was renamed again, just five months later on 20 July 2012, The Bet Butler Stadium.

On 9 July 2015, the stadium was unveiled as the Cheaper Insurance Direct Stadium, after fan Alex Couper and his company took over the sponsorship.

At the end of the 2016–17 season the name reverted to Dumbarton Football Stadium. In July 2017 the club agreed a deal with local radio station Your Radio, which would see the stadium known as 'The YOUR Radio 103FM Stadium' for at least the next two years. That deal was cancelled in May 2018 with Your Radio facing an uncertain future, with C&G Systems agreeing a three-year deal a week later.

In September 2021 Manchester-based housing specialists Moreroom agreed a deal with the club to be the sponsors for the 2021-22 season and the name of the stadium was changed to the Moreroom.com Stadium. Following the dissolution of Moreroom in 2023, the name reverted to The Dumbarton Football Stadium.

In July 2024 Marbill Coaches bought the naming rights, with the ground renamed The Marbill Coaches Stadium. In April 2026 the stadium was officially renamed The Rock sponsored by Marbill Coaches, the name traditionally used by fans.

== See also ==
- Stadium relocations in Scottish football
