= 2020–21 Dumbarton F.C. season =

Dumbarton
2020–21 season
- Chairman: John Steele
- Manager: Jim Duffy
- Stadium: C&G Systems Stadium
- League One: 9th (won playoffs)
- League Cup: Group stage
- Scottish Cup: 3rd round (lost to Aberdeen
- Top goalscorer: League: Jaime Wilson (4); All: Jaime Wilson (7)
- Highest home attendance: 398 (v Edinburgh City May 20, 2021)
Home colours	Away colours

The 2020–21 season will be Dumbarton Football Club's third in Scottish League One, the third tier of Scottish football, having finished sixth in the division in 2019–20. Dumbarton also competed in the Scottish League Cup and the Scottish Cup.

== Story of the season ==
=== July ===
After the premature end to the season due to the COVID-19 pandemic in the United Kingdom, preparations for the new campaign began in July with manager Jim Duffy signing a one-year contract extension. He was followed by defenders Morgyn Neill, Ryan McGeever and forward Stefan McCluskey in committing to the club for the new season. Young Player of the Year Rico Quitongo was next to sign a new deal, and he was joined by midfielder Ruaridh Langan. Striker Denny Johnstone then became the club's first new signing of the summer - joining after leaving Falkirk. Striker Robert Jones and captain Stuart Carswell were next to sign new deals. A day later PJ Crossan agreed a new deal, becoming the 10th player to sign up for the new campaign after six goals in his first season with the club. Later that week nine players left the club at the expiry of the contract, with player of the year Kyle Hutton, top scorer Isaac Layne, leading assister Joe McKee and number one goalkeeper Conor Brennan joined by Lewis Crawford, Jordan Pettigrew, Callum Wilson, Jai Quitongo and Ryan Tierney in leaving the club.

=== August ===
Sam Wardrop was the club's second new signing of the window, joining from Dundee United after two successful loan spells. The Sons were drawn against Kilmarnock, Dunfermline Athletic, Clyde and Falkirk in the Scottish League Cup, which was scheduled the start the season in early October. On 25 August the club started pre-season training following a change in the Scottish Government guidelines implemented due to the COVID-19 pandemic in Scotland. Two days later Jim Paton became the club's new groundsman, replacing Alan Brown.

=== September ===
On 1 September midfielder Nat Wedderburn became the club's third new season of the summer, joining on a one-year deal after leaving Airdrieonians. Goalkeeper Kevin Dąbrowski was next to join, signing on a season long loan from Hibernian. The Sons played their first game in over six months on 15 September, defeating local rivals Clydebank 4-0 in a closed doors friendly with trialist Jaime Wilson and new signing Denny Johnstone both scoring twice. Johnstone was again on the scoresheet in a friendly defeat to Greenock Morton before a 3-2 victory against Albion Rovers with Robert Jones scoring twice and Ross Forbes finding the net from long range. The Sons then drew 1-1 with BSC Glasgow with a trialist on the scoresheet. Defender Chris Hamilton became the club's fifth new signing of the summer, joining on-loan from Heart of Midlothian.

=== October ===
On 2 October long-serving goalkeeper coach Jamie Ewings left the club after nine seasons with the club as a player and a coach. He was replaced by former Ayr United and Annan Athletic goalkeeper coach Robert Glen in the role. The same day C&G Systems were announced as the club's new shirt sponsors for the upcoming season. Goalkeeper Chris Smith became the club's sixth new signing of the summer. Returning to the club on a permanent deal after a loan spell from East Kilbride in 2018–19. The Sons season started with a 1-0 Scottish League Cup defeat to Dunfermline Athletic, before a 3-2 defeat to Clyde with Chris Hamilton scoring his first goal for the club - and being sent off. Forward Jaime Wilson became the club's seventh new signing of the summer on 12 October, joining from National Premier Leagues Victoria 2 side Northcote City. Donald Morrison became the club's next new addition, joining from Inverness Caledonian Thistle on 16 October. The Sons' league season began with a 0-0 draw against Forfar Athletic, with winger Matthew Reilly playing as a trialist. He went on to sign permanently for the club on 23 October before the club's first home league game against Clyde was called off due to a waterlogged pitch. The following week Adam Frizzell became the club's 10th new addition of the summer on 30 October, joining on a permanent basis after a successful loan spell. The same day it was announced that the Sons next home match, against Airdrieonians, would be switched to the Excelsior Stadium due to forecast poor weather. Despite the change of venue Sons still recorded their first victory of the season in the match, with Jaime Wilson and a Leon McCann own goal securing a 2-0 win.

=== November ===
The Sons continued their good start to the season with a 1-0 victory against Clyde on 3 November. Adam Frizzell got the only goal on his second debut for the club. The same day goalkeeper Chris Calder joined the club on an emergency loan from West of Scotland Football League side St Roch's. The unbeaten start to the season ended on 7 November against East Fife in a game where Dumbarton had three goals disallowed. Three days later Sons lost again, 4-0 at home to Falkirk, in the Scottish League Cup - in a tie where they were only able to name one outfield substitute. Three days later the Sons strengthened their squad again, with the addition of defender Daniel Church from Celtic. Church made his debut the next day, as the Sons dismal Scottish League Cup form continued with a 2-0 defeat to Kilmarnock. Back on league duty, Dumbarton recorded a fourth consecutive defeat - losing 1-0 to Peterhead. A miserable month ended with Sons suffering a fifth straight defeat, 3-0 at home to Falkirk on 24 November.

=== December ===
The Sons barren run in front of goal stretched into December, as the month opened with a 0-0 draw against Partick Thistle - with Kevin Dąbrowski saving a first-half Brian Graham penalty. In that game 16-year-old goalkeeper Michael Carr was named on the bench, becoming the youngest ever play to be involved in a Sons matchday squad. A week later Nat Wedderburn then got the only goal as Sons ended their winless streak with a 1-0 home victory against Cove Rangers. They failed to build on that however, suffering a heavy defeat to Montrose the following week. The club's final game of 2020 against East Fife on Boxing Day was then called off because of a waterlogged pitch.

=== January ===
Another postponement followed, as the Sons' tie with Airdrieonians on 2 January was called off because of a frozen pitch. The decision meant that five of the club's first six home matches of the league season had been rearranged - with four failing pitch inspections and one moved due to Falkirk advancing in the Scottish League Cup. Days later goalkeeper Kevin Dąbrowski, who had been a key figure, was recalled by Hibernian after an injury to Ofir Marciano. He was followed out by fellow loanee Chris Hamilton who was recalled by Heart of Midlothian and loaned to Stirling Albion. On January 9 goalkeeper Joshua Bradley-Hurst became the club's first signing of the winter window, joining from Birmingham City however the same day the Sons Scottish Cup tie with Highland Football League side Huntly became the club's sixth game of the season to be called off. The following day defender Daniel Church and midfielder Adam Frizzell extended their deals until the end of the season, whilst defender Donald Morrison left the club at the end of his short-term deal. On January 11 the Sons season was put on hold, with a three week suspension of lower league football introduced due to the COVID-19 pandemic in Scotland. The season postponement was then extended further - until at least mid-February.

=== February ===
The suspension of lower league football was extended into March in early February - despite clubs offering to test their players weekly. This led to calls from Stefan McCluskey for the Scottish Government to rethink their decision whilst a PFA Scotland survey showed that players were overwhelmingly in favour of a return to the pitch.

=== March ===
On March 2 First Minister Nicola Sturgeon gave clubs the green-light to return to action with the resumption of the league season scheduled for Saturday March 20. The club's outstanding 2020–21 Scottish Cup tie with Huntly was also rescheduled - for March 23. After returning to training on March 6, Jim Duffy started to reshape his squad - with winger Matthew Reilly and striker Denny Johnstone both departing. Midfielder Tomas Brindley became the club's first arrival of the month, joining on loan from Kilmarnock on March 11. On March 13 the Sons finally returned to the pitch after almost three months, losing 2-1 in a friendly to Scottish League Two side Stranraer. Goalkeeper Sam Ramsbottom was the club's third new face of the winter window, joining after Joshua Bradley-Hurst suffered an injury. He was followed in arriving before the first game of 2021 by defender Nicholas McAllister, who joined on loan from St Mirren. The Sons season resumed with defeat to Forfar Athletic on March 20 - courtesy of an unfortunate Ryan McGeever own goal. Two days later winger Stefan McCluskey who was ruled out for the season with a shoulder injury left the club whilst Conner Duthie - who had featured as a trialist again Forfar - signed a deal until the end of the season. Winger Rabin Omar and striker James Wallace were next to arrive, joining on-loan from Greenock Morton. Following a 1-0 defeat to Peterhead striker Isaac Layne rejoined the club on-loan from the Blue Toon. He made his debut as a late substitute on March 30, in a 1-1 draw with Falkirk where Rabin Omar scored his first goal for the Sons.

=== April ===
April began with another 1-0 home loss, this time against Airdrieonians. Another 1-0 home loss - the Sons' fourth in five games - followed, this time to Scottish Premiership side Aberdeen in the Scottish Cup. Goalkeeper Chris Smith left the club on April 6 due to work commitments with Jamie Barclay signed on an emergency loan deal from Kilwinning Rangers as his replacement. On April 8 the Sons finally secured their first league win of 2020, with Ryan McGeever and Adam Frizzell on target in a 2-1 victory against East Fife. A controversial defeat to Cove Rangers followed, before a second victory of the year against Clyde thanks to a Nat Wedderburn header. That victory was followed by back-to-back defeats to Partick Thistle and East Fife. The run was halted on April 27, with a 1-0 success against Forfar Athletic courtesy of Conner Duthie's late strike. The month ended with private equity firm Cognitive Capital Ltd buying out Brabco 736, to become the club's majority shareholder.

=== May ===
May began with a 2-0 defeat to Clyde that left the Sons a point adrift of safety with just one game remaining. The regular season ended on May 4, with a dramatic 3-2 victory against Peterhead thanks to an injury time header from Jaime Wilson. Two days later however Clyde defeated East Fife to send the Sons into the playoffs, with the semi-final seeing Jim Duffy's side defeat Stranraer over two legs thanks to Jaime Wilson's goal. The Sons secured their place in Scottish League One with a 3-2 final victory against Edinburgh City. Goals from Ryan McGeever, Tomas Brindley and Morgyn Neill saw Dumbarton win the first-leg 3-1, before losing the second 1-0 with Ouzy See getting the only goal. The home leg was played in front of a sell-out crowd of 398 - the first time in 15 months fans had been able to attend a game due to the COVID-19 pandemic in Scotland.

== First team transfers ==
- From end of 2019–20 season, to last match of season 2020–21

=== In ===
Player	From	League	Fee
Denny Johnstone	Falkirk	Scottish League One	Free
Sam Wardrop	Dundee United	Scottish Premiership	Free
Nat Wedderburn	Airdrieonians	Scottish League One	Free
Kevin Dąbrowski	Hibernian	Scottish Premiership	Loan
Chris Hamilton	Heart of Midlothian	Scottish Championship	Loan
Chris Smith	Annan Athletic	Scottish League Two	Free
Jaime Wilson	Northcote City	National Premier Leagues Victoria 2	Free
Donald Morrison	Inverness Caledonian Thistle	Scottish Championship	Free
Matthew Reilly	Glenafton Athletic	West of Scotland Football League	Free
Adam Frizzell	Kilmarnock	Scottish Premiership	Free
Chris Calder	St Roch's	West of Scotland Football League	Loan
Daniel Church	Celtic	Scottish Premiership	Free
Joshua Bradley-Hurst	Birmingham City	EFL Championship	Free
Tomas Brindley	Kilmarnock	Scottish Premiership	Loan
Sam Ramsbottom	Greenock Morton	Scottish Championship	Free
Nicholas McAllister	St Mirren	Scottish Premiership	Loan
Conner Duthie	Free agent		Free
Rabin Omar	Greenock Morton	Scottish Championship	Loan
James Wallace	Greenock Morton	Scottish Championship	Loan
Isaac Layne	Peterhead	Scottish League One	Loan
Jamie Barclay	Kilwinning Rangers	West of Scotland Football League	Loan

=== Out ===
Player	To	League	Fee
Joe McKee	Queen of the South	Scottish Championship	Free
Conor Brennan	East Kilbride	Lowland Football League	Free
Lewis Crawford	Linlithgow Rose	East of Scotland Football League	Free
Isaac Layne	Peterhead	Scottish League One	Free
Ryan Tierney	BSC Glasgow	Lowland Football League	Free
Callum Wilson	Albion Rovers	Scottish League Two	Free
Kyle Hutton	East Kilbride	Lowland Football League	Free
Jai Quitongo	Queen's Park	Scottish League Two	Free
Jordan Pettigrew	Annan Athletic	Scottish League Two	Free
Donald Morrison	Clachnacuddin	Highland Football League	Free
Denny Johnstone	Retired	N/A	Free
Matthew Reilly	Released		Free
Stefan McCluskey	Forfar Athletic	Scottish League Two	Free
Chris Smith	Retired	N/A	Free

== Fixtures and results ==
Win Draw Loss Upcoming fixture

=== Friendlies ===
15 September 2020 Friendly	Clydebank	0 - 4	Dumbarton	Holm Park
19:30		Report	Wilson (trialist) 30' 55', Denny Johnstone 60' 90'	Attendance: Closed doors

19 September 2020 Friendly	Dumbarton	1 - 2	Greenock Morton	Dumbarton Football Stadium
12:00	Denny Johnstone 26'	Report	Robbie Muirhead 55' (pen.) Gary Oliver 65' (pen.)	Attendance: Closed doors

23 September 2020 Friendly	Albion Rovers	2 - 3	Dumbarton	Cliftonhill Stadium
19:30	Gabe Skeoch 60', Aron Lynas 66'	Report	Robert Jones 23' 28', Ross Forbes 36'	Attendance: Closed doors

26 September 2020 Friendly	Dumbarton	1 - 1	BSC Glasgow	Dumbarton Football Stadium
12:00	Trialist 82'	Report	Alfredo Agyeman 31'	Attendance: Closed doors

13 March 2021 Friendly	Stranraer	2 - 1	Dumbarton	Holm Park
12:00	Tom Devitt 57', James Hilton 63'	Report	Jaime Wilson 33'	Attendance: Closed doors

=== Scottish League One ===
17 October 2020 League One	Forfar Athletic	0 – 0	Dumbarton	Station Park, Forfar
15:00		Report		Attendance: Closed doors Referee: Peter Stuart

31 October 2020 League One	Airdrieonians	0 – 2	Dumbarton	Excelsior Stadium
15:00		Report	Jaime Wilson 22' OG 60'	Attendance: Closed doors Referee: Alan Muir

3 November 2020 League One	Dumbarton	1 – 0	Clyde	Dumbarton Football Stadium
19:00	Adam Frizzell 13'	Report		Attendance: Closed doors Referee: Duncan Williams

7 November 2020 League One	East Fife	2 – 1	Dumbarton	Bayview Stadium
15:00	Jack Hamilton 18' Ryan Wallace 69'	Report	Jaime Wilson 61'	Attendance: Closed doors Referee: Peter Stuart

21 November 2020 League One	Peterhead	1 – 0	Dumbarton	Balmoor Stadium
15:00	Ben Armour 4'	Report		Attendance: Closed doors Referee: Calum Scott

24 November 2020 League One	Dumbarton	0 – 3	Falkirk	Dumbarton Football Stadium
19:00		Report	Callumn Morrison 16', Blair Alston 31', Aidan Connolly 77'	Attendance: Closed doors Referee: Steven Kirkland

5 December 2020 League One	Partick Thistle	0 – 0	Dumbarton	Firhill Stadium
15:00		Report		Attendance: Closed doors Referee: David Lowe

12 December 2020 League One	Dumbarton	1 – 0	Cove Rangers	Dumbarton Football Stadium
15:00	Nat Wedderburn 51'	Report		Attendance: Closed doors Referee: Greg Aitken

19 December 2020 League One	Montrose	4 – 0	Dumbarton	Links Park
15:00	Andrew Steeves 8', Cammy Ballantyne 24' 85', Russell McLean 40'	Report		Attendance: Closed doors Referee: Matthew MacDermid

20 March 2021 League One	Dumbarton	0 – 1	Forfar Athletic	Dumbarton Football Stadium
15:00		Report	OG 57'	Attendance: Closed doors

27 March 2021 League One	Dumbarton	0 – 1	Peterhead	Dumbarton Football Stadium
15:00		Report	Ben Armour 54'	Attendance: Closed doors Referee: Peter Stuart

30 March 2021 League One	Falkirk	1 – 1	Dumbarton	Falkirk Stadium
19:45	Anton Dowds 74' Mark Durnan (red card) 80'	Report	Rabin Omar 68'	Attendance: Closed doors Referee: Steven Kirkland

1 April 2021 League One	Dumbarton	0 – 1	Airdrieonians	Dumbarton Football Stadium
19:45	Ross Forbes (red card) 90'	Report	Ally Roy 79'	Attendance: Closed doors Referee: Gavin Ross

6 April 2021 League One	Dumbarton	0 – 0	Montrose	Dumbarton Football Stadium
19:00		Report		Attendance: Closed doors Referee: Calum Scott

8 April 2021 League One	Dumbarton	2 – 1	East Fife	Dumbarton Football Stadium
19:00	Ryan McGeever 3', Adam Frizzell 68'	Report	Ross Dunlop 90'	Attendance: Closed doors Referee: Barry Cook

10 April 2021 League One	Cove Rangers	1 – 0	Dumbarton	Balmoral Stadium
15:00	Rory McAllister 54'	Report		Attendance: Closed doors Referee: David Lowe

15 April 2021 League One	Clyde	0 – 1	Dumbarton	Broadwood Stadium
19:00		Report	Nat Wedderburn 45'	Attendance: Closed doors Referee: Grant Irvine

20 April 2021 League One	Dumbarton	0 – 2	Partick Thistle	Dumbarton Football Stadium
15:00		Report	Zak Rudden 79', Ross MacIver 89'	Attendance: Closed doors Referee: Barry Cook

24 April 2021 League One	East Fife	2 – 1	Dumbarton	Bayview Stadium
15:00	Aaron Dunsmore 28', Aaron Steele 67'	Report	PJ Crossan 80'	Attendance: Closed doors Referee: Gavin Ross

27 April 2021 League One	Dumbarton	1 – 0	Forfar Athletic	Dumbarton Football Stadium
19:00	Conner Duthie 88'	Report		Attendance: Closed doors Referee: Matthew MacDermid

1 May 2021 League One	Clyde	2 – 0	Dumbarton	Broadwood Stadium
15:00	Mark Lamont 31', Ross Cunningham 75'	Report		Attendance: Closed doors Referee: David Lowe

4 May 2021 League One	Dumbarton	3 – 2	Peterhead	Dumbarton Football Stadium
19:00	Jaime Wilson 21' 90+1', Morgyn Neill 80'	Report	Steven Boyd 34', Derek Lyle 62'	Attendance: Closed doors Referee: David Dickenson

=== Scottish League One Playoffs ===
8 May 2021 Semi-final	Stranraer	0 - 0	Dumbarton	Stair Park
15:00		Report		Attendance: Closed doors Referee: Peter Stuart

11 May 2021 Semi-final	Dumbarton	1 - 0 (1 – 0 agg.)	Stranraer	Dumbarton Football Stadium
19:45	Jaime Wilson 36'	Report		Attendance: Closed doors Referee: Gavin Duncan

17 May 2021 Final	Edinburgh City	1 - 3	Dumbarton	Ainslie Park
19:45	Robbie MacIntyre 44'	Report	Ryan McGeever 53', Tomas Brindley 67', Morgyn Neill 82'	Attendance: Closed doors Referee: Colin Steven

20 May 2021 Final	Dumbarton	0 - 1 (3 – 2 agg.)	Edinburgh City	Dumbarton Football Stadium
19:45		Report	Ousman See 52', Liam Henderson (yellow card) 8' (yellow-red card) 58'	Attendance: 398; Referee: Alan Newlands

=== Scottish Cup ===
23 March 2021 Second round	Dumbarton	4 - 0	Huntly	Dumbarton Football Stadium
19:45	Jaime Wilson 31' 69', Ryan McGeever 40', Ross Forbes 75'	Report		Attendance: Closed doors Referee: Matthew McDermid

3 April 2021 Third round	Dumbarton	0 - 1	Aberdeen	Dumbarton Football Stadium
15:00		Report	Callum Hendry 83'	Attendance: Closed doors Referee: Don Robertson

=== Scottish League Cup ===
==== Matches ====
6 October 2020 Group Stage	Dumbarton	0 - 1	Dunfermline Athletic	Dumbarton Football Stadium
19:45		Report	Kevin O'Hara 26' (pen.)	Attendance: Closed Doors; Referee: Gavin Ross

10 October 2020 Group Stage	Clyde	3 - 2	Dumbarton	Broadwood Stadium
15:00	Barry Cuddihy 10', David Goodwillie 22' (pen.), Ross Cunningham 45'	Report	Chris Hamilton 40' (red card) 90', Robert Jones 55'	Attendance: Closed doors Referee: Scott Lambie

10 November 2020 Group Stage	Dumbarton	0 - 4	Falkirk	Dumbarton Football Stadium
19:45		Report	Callumn Morrison 12' 49', Conor Sammon 72', Anton Dowds 84'	Attendance: Closed door Referee: Scott Lambie

14 November 2020 Group Stage	Kilmarnock	2 - 0	Dumbarton	Rugby Park
15:00	Eamonn Brophy 2', Mitch Pinnock 45'	Report		Attendance: Closed doors Referee: Gavin Duncan

== Player statistics ==
As of 23:53, 20 May 2021 (UTC)

=== All competitions ===
#	Position	Player	Starts	Subs	Unused subs	Goals	Red cards (red card)	Yellow cards (yellow card)
21	GK	(Scotland) Jamie Barclay	0	0	11	0	0	0
1	GK	(Scotland) Joshua Bradley-Hurst	0	0	0	0	0	0
17	MF	(Scotland) Tomas Brindley	14	3	2	0	0	2
21	GK	(Scotland) Chris Calder	0	1	3	0	0	0
21	GK	(Scotland) Michael Carr	0	0	2	0	0	0
6	MF	(Scotland) Stuart Carswell	23	3	0	0	0	7
24	FW	(Scotland) PJ Crossan	8	10	0	1	0	2
19	DF	(Scotland) Daniel Church	6	0	0	0	0	0
1	GK	(Poland) Kevin Dąbrowski	12	0	0	0	0	0
15	MF	(Scotland) Conner Duthie	1	13	5	1	0	0
8	MF	(Scotland) Ross Forbes	27	1	0	1	1	3
11	MF	(Scotland) Adam Frizzell	22	3	4	2	0	2
18	DF	(Scotland) Chris Hamilton	9	1	0	1	1	3
9	FW	(Scotland) Denny Johnstone	4	7	0	0	0	0
10	FW	(Scotland) Robert Jones	16	14	2	1	0	1
4	MF	(Scotland) Ruaridh Langan	8	11	11	0	0	1
20	FW	(England) Isaac Layne	1	1	1	0	0	0
18	DF	(Scotland) Nicholas McAllister	16	0	2	0	0	2
7	FW	(Scotland) Stefan McCluskey	1	3	1	0	0	0
2	DF	(Scotland) Ryan McGeever	26	0	1	3	0	3
15	DF	(Scotland) Donald Morrison	1	3	5	0	0	0
5	DF	(Scotland) Morgyn Neill	31	0	0	2	0	5
7	MF	(Netherlands) Rabin Omar	8	8	1	1	0	2
3	DF	(Scotland) Rico Quitongo	24	1	1	0	0	3
1	GK	(England) Sam Ramsbottom	17	0	2	0	0	0
17	MF	(Scotland) Matthew Reilly	2	4	1	0	0	0
21	GK	(Scotland) Chris Smith	3	0	8	0	0	0
9	ST	(Scotland) James Wallace	6	7	4	0	0	1
12	DF	(Scotland) Sam Wardrop	22	0	1	0	0	3
16	MF	(England) Nat Wedderburn	23	3	1	2	0	4
14	FW	(Scotland) Jaime Wilson	19	7	2	7	0	4

=== Captains ===
No.	P	Name	Country	No. games	Notes
6	MF	Stuart Carswell	(Scotland)	23	
8	MF	Ross Forbes	(Scotland)	2	
5	DF	Morgyn Neill	(Scotland)	6	
16	MF	Nat Wedderburn	(England)	1	

Last updated: As of match played 23:53, 20 May 2021 (UTC)
Source: Competitive match reports.
Competitive matches only
Matches started as captain only
Country: FIFA nationality; No.: Squad number; P: Position; Name: Player name; No. Games: Number of games started as captain.

== League table ==
Pos	Team	Pld	W	D	L	GF	GA	GD	Pts	Promotion, qualification or relegation
6	East Fife	22	10	3	9	30	33	−3	33	
7	Peterhead	22	9	2	11	24	27	−3	29	
8	Clyde	22	8	2	12	27	38	−11	26	
9	Dumbarton (O)	22	7	4	11	14	24	−10	25	Qualification for the League One play-offs
10	Forfar Athletic (R)	22	4	5	13	18	37	−19	17	Relegation to League Two

Source: SPFL
Rules for classification: 1) Points; 2) Goal difference; 3) Goals scored; 4) Head-to-to head points; 5) Head-to-head goal difference; 6) Play-off (only for deciding promotion, play-off participation and relegation).
(O) Play-off winners; (R) Relegated
