= 2019–20 Falkirk F.C. season =

Falkirk
2019–20 season
- Chairman: Gary Deans
- Manager: Ray McKinnon (until 16 November); David McCracken & Lee Miller (from 19 November)
- Stadium: Falkirk Stadium
- League One: 2nd
- Scottish Cup: Fifth round
- League Cup: Group stage
- Challenge Cup: Third round
- Top goalscorer: League: Declan McManus (19); All: Declan McManus (24)
- Highest home attendance: 5,976 vs. Heart of Midlothian, Scottish Cup, 8 February 2020
- Lowest home attendance: 1,706 vs. Celtic U21s, Challenge Cup, 13 August 2019
- Average home league attendance: 3,713
Home colours	Away colours

The 2019–20 season was Falkirk's first season in League One following their relegation from the Championship at the end of the 2018–19 season. Falkirk also competed in the League Cup, Challenge Cup and the Scottish Cup. On 13 March 2020 all SPFL competitions were indefinitely suspended due to the coronavirus pandemic.

== Summary ==
Falkirk began the season on 3 August 2019 and was scheduled to end on 2 May 2020. On 8 April 2020, the SPFL proposed to end the 2019–20 season by utilising a points per game ratio to determine the final standings. The plan was approved on 15 April 2020, declaring that the season was over, with Raith Rovers being named as title winners and relegating Stranraer to League Two.

=== Management ===
Falkirk began the 2019–20 season under the management of Ray McKinnon who had been appointed midway through the previous season. On 16 November, McKinnon left his position as manager with the club in fourth place. Former Falkirk player David McCracken and striker Lee Miller were appointed as replacement co-managers on 19 November on an interim basis before being installed permanently on 13 December.

== Results and fixtures ==
Win Draw Loss Postponed

=== Pre Season ===
2 July 2019	Falkirk	0–2	Hamilton Academical	Stirling
15:00		Report		Stadium: University of Stirling

6 July 2019	Falkirk	2–2	Partick Thistle	Stirling
15:00	Connolly; Trialist	Report	Bannigan; Mansell	Stadium: University of Stirling

10 July 2019	Brechin City	0–3	Falkirk	Brechin
19:45		Report	Johnstone 10'; Sammon 59' (pen.); Trialist 61'	Stadium: Glebe Park

=== Scottish League One ===
3 August 2019 1	Peterhead	0–0	Falkirk	Peterhead
15:00		Report	McShane (yellow card) 71'	Stadium: Balmoor Stadium; Attendance: 1,513; Referee: Colin Steven

10 August 2019 2	Falkirk	6–0	Dumbarton	Falkirk
15:00	Sammon 7' (yellow card) 42' (goal) 53'; McManus 11', 34', 42'; Telfer 38'	Report	McMillan (yellow card) 45+1'	Stadium: Falkirk Stadium; Attendance: 4,060; Referee: Graham Beaton

17 August 2019 3	Falkirk	2–1	Montrose	Falkirk
15:00	Sammon 31', 56'; Buchanan (yellow card) 90+2'	Report	Josh Skelly 17'; Ballantyne (yellow card) 59'; Webster (yellow card) 64'; Russell McLean (yellow card) 90+3'	Stadium: Falkirk Stadium; Attendance: 3,736; Referee: Steven Reid

24 August 2019 4	Clyde	1–0	Falkirk	Cumbernauld
15:00	Mark Lamont 34'; Grant (yellow card) 51'	Report	Gomis (yellow card) 8'; Telfer (yellow card) 40'	Stadium: Broadwood Stadium; Attendance: 2,048; Referee: David Lowe

31 August 2019 5	Airdrieonians	0–0	Falkirk	Airdrie
15:00		Report	Durnan (yellow card) 82'	Stadium: Excelsior Stadium; Attendance: 1,888; Referee: David Dickinson

14 September 2019 6	Falkirk	3–0	Forfar Athletic	Falkirk
15:00	Doyle 14'; Longridge 18', 86'; Durnan (yellow card) 43'; Gomis (yellow card) 68'; McManus (yellow card) 75'	Report	Tapping (yellow card) 74'; Bain (yellow card) 76'	Stadium: Falkirk Stadium; Attendance: 3,663; Referee: Barry Cook

21 September 2019 7	Stranraer	0–3	Falkirk	Stranraer
15:00		Report	McMillan 24'; Telfer 67'; Gomis 81'	Stadium: Stair Park; Attendance: 549; Referee: Grant Irvine

28 September 2019 8	Falkirk	0–0	East Fife	Falkirk
15:00	Longridge (yellow card) 38'	Report	Higgins (yellow card) 44'	Stadium: Falkirk Stadium; Attendance: 3,933; Referee: David Dickinson

5 October 2019 9	Raith Rovers	2–2	Falkirk	Kirkcaldy
15:00	Miller 60'; Armstrong 78'; Davidson (yellow card) 82'	Report	Longridge 3'; Sammon 17'; Gomis (yellow card) 28'; Dixon (yellow card) 60'; Telfer (yellow card) 66'; McShane (yellow card) 85'	Stadium: Stark's Park; Attendance: 2,756; Referee: Scott Lambie

19 October 2019 10	Falkirk	4–0	Peterhead	Falkirk
15:00	Sammon 13'; Telfer (yellow card) 31'; McMillan 36'; Longridge 59'; McManus 64'	Report	Hooper (yellow card) 59'; Boyle (yellow card) 70'; Stevenson (yellow card) 74'	Stadium: Falkirk Stadium; Attendance: 3,289; Referee: Grant Irvine

26 October 2019 11	Falkirk	0–1	Clyde	Falkirk
15:00	Sammon (yellow card) 28'; Gomis (yellow card) 77' (yellow-red card) 87'	Report	Love (yellow card) 50'; Smith 81'; Mitchell (yellow card) 90+2'	Stadium: Falkirk Stadium; Attendance: 4,021; Referee: Mike Roncone

2 November 2019 12	Forfar Athletic	0–2	Falkirk	Forfar
15:00	Docherty (yellow card) 31'; Robertson (yellow card) 59'; Ross Meechan (yellow card) 89'	Report	Durnan 33' (yellow card) 36'; Doyle (yellow card) 38'; Buchanan (yellow card) 44'; Travis 86' (o.g.); Longridge (yellow card) 89'	Stadium: Station Park; Attendance: 998; Referee: Kevin Graham

9 November 2019 13	Falkirk	1–2	Airdrieonians	Falkirk
15:00	McManus 71'; Doyle (yellow card) 86'; Durnan (yellow card) 90+2'	Report	McKay 32'; Kyle MacDonald (yellow card) 60'; Gallagher 90+3'; Millar (yellow card) 90+4'	Stadium: Falkirk Stadium; Attendance: 4,000; Referee: Steven Kirkland

16 November 2019 14	Dumbarton	1–1	Falkirk	Dumbarton
15:00	Crossan (yellow card) 16'; Layne 29' (yellow card) 42'; Hutton (yellow card) 60'; Carswell (yellow card) 90+2'	Report	Doyle (yellow card) 16'; Durnan (yellow card) 56'; Buchanan (yellow card) 66'; McManus 90' (pen.)	Stadium: Dumbarton Football Stadium; Attendance: 982; Referee: Barry Cook

30 November 2019 15	Falkirk	3–0	Stranraer	Falkirk
15:00	McManus 18' (yellow card) 78'; Doyle 40'; Durnan 72'	Report		Stadium: Falkirk Stadium; Attendance: 3,488; Referee: Steven Reid

7 December 2019 16	East Fife	0–0	Falkirk	Methil
15:00	Patrick Slattery (yellow card) 31'	Report	Durnan (yellow card) 89'; Toshney (yellow card) 90+3'	Stadium: Bayview Stadium; Attendance: 1,182; Referee: Craig Napier

14 December 2019 17	Falkirk	1–1	Raith Rovers	Falkirk
15:00	Dixon (yellow card) 13'; Telfer (red card) 14'; Miller (yellow card) 56'; McManus 58'; Gomis (yellow card) 61' (yellow-red card) 83'	Report	David McKay (yellow card) 18'; Gullan 37'; Benedictus (yellow card) 51' (yellow-red card) 65'; Kieron Bowie (yellow card) 74'	Stadium: Falkirk Stadium; Attendance: 4,024; Referee: Gavin Ross

21 December 2019 18	Montrose	2–3	Falkirk	Montrose
15:00	Paul Watson (yellow card) 23'; Terry Masson 67'; Webster 85' (pen.)	Report	McMillan 39'; McManus 52'; Longridge (yellow card) 61'; MacLean (yellow card) 83'; Connolly 90+1'	Stadium: Links Park; Attendance: 1,095; Referee: Gavin Duncan

28 December 2019 19	Airdrieonians	1–1	Falkirk	Airdrie
15:00	Carrick 39' (pen.); Leon McCann (yellow card) 60'	Report	Toshney (yellow card) 27'; McMillan 34'; Connolly (yellow card) 36'; Buchanan (yellow card) 39'; MacLean (yellow card) 66'	Stadium: Excelsior Stadium; Attendance: 2,530; Referee: David Dickinson

4 January 2020 20	Falkirk	3–0	Dumbarton	Falkirk
15:00	Telfer 38'; McManus 63', 85'	Report	Carswell (yellow card) 70'; Tumilty (yellow card) 71'	Stadium: Falkirk Stadium; Attendance: 3,807; Referee: Euan Anderson

11 January 2020 21	Peterhead	1–3	Falkirk	Peterhead
15:00	Leitch (yellow card) 15'; Durnan 26' (o.g.); McAllister (yellow card) 36'; Ferguson (red card) 61'	Report	McManus 9', 24', 62' (pen.) (yellow card) 30'; Durnan (yellow card) 72'	Stadium: Balmoor Stadium; Attendance: 886; Referee: Steven Reid

25 January 2020 22	Falkirk	6–0	Forfar Athletic	Falkirk
15:00	Stanger 45+1' (o.g.); Hall 72', 87'; Connolly 83', 89'; Dixon 90+2'	Report	Kirkpatrick (yellow card) 49'; Darren Whyte (yellow card) 71'	Stadium: Falkirk Stadium; Attendance: 3,522; Referee: Craig Napier

1 February 2020 23	Stranraer	1–1	Falkirk	Stranraer
15:00	Thomson 52'	Report	Connolly 31'	Stadium: Stair Park; Attendance: 546; Referee: John McKendrick

18 February 2020 24	Falkirk	2–0	East Fife	Falkirk
19:45	Doyle 72'; McManus 77'	Report		Stadium: Falkirk Stadium; Attendance: 3,376; Referee: Steven Reid

22 February 2020 25	Falkirk	1–0	Montrose	Falkirk
15:00	McManus 40' (pen.) (red card) 70'	Report		Stadium: Falkirk Stadium; Attendance: 3,561; Referee: Grant Irvine

29 February 2020 26	Clyde	3–2	Falkirk	Cumbernauld
15:00	Lamont 3'; Goodwillie 43' (pen.), 53'	Report	Telfer 45+1' (pen.); Longridge 90'	Stadium: Broadwood Stadium; Attendance: 1,784; Referee: David Dickinson

3 March 2020 27	Raith Rovers	1–1	Falkirk	Kirkcaldy
15:00	MacLean 47'	Report	McManus 69'	Stadium: Stark's Park; Attendance: 3,235; Referee: Peter Stuart

7 March 2020 28	Falkirk	3–0	Peterhead	Falkirk
15:00	Miller 9'; McManus 25' (pen.), 61'	Report		Stadium: Falkirk Stadium; Attendance: 3,507; Referee: Craig Napier

=== Scottish League Cup ===
==== Group stage ====
Results

13 July 2019 1	Falkirk	1–1 (3–4 p)	Livingston	Falkirk
15:00	Connolly (yellow card) 6'; Dixon (yellow card) 68'; Sammon 90'	Report	Dykes 36'	Stadium: Falkirk Stadium; Attendance: 2,121; Referee: Alan Muir

16 July 2019 2	Falkirk	1–0	Stranraer	Falkirk
19:45	McManus 9'	Report	Cummins (yellow card) 52'; Robertson (yellow card) 57'; Hamill (yellow card) 77'	Stadium: Falkirk Stadium; Attendance: 1,838; Referee: Chris Fordyce

20 July 2019 3	Ayr United	2–1	Falkirk	Ayr
15:00	McCowan 26'; Moffat (yellow card) 36'; Doohan (yellow card) 47'; Geggan 75'; Muirhead (yellow card) 78'	Report	McShane (yellow card) 22'; McManus 42'; Durnan (red card) 47'; Buchanan (yellow card) 78'	Stadium: Somerset Park; Attendance: 1,605; Referee: Barry Cook

23 July 2019 4	Berwick Rangers	0–3	Falkirk	Berwick-upon-Tweed
19:45	Lewis Barr (yellow card) 30'; Jack Cook (yellow card) 65'	Report	McManus 13'; Gomis (yellow card) 38'; Leitch 51'; Johnstone 76'	Stadium: Shielfield Park; Attendance: 509; Referee: Steven Kirkland

Pos	Team	Pld	W	PW	PL	L	GF	GA	GD	Pts	Qualification	LIV	AYR	FAL	STR	BER
1	Livingston	4	3	1	0	0	10	3	+7	11	Qualification for the Second Round	—	2–1	—	—	5–0
2	Ayr United	4	2	0	1	1	12	5	+7	7		—	—	2–1	2–2p	—
3	Falkirk	4	2	0	1	1	6	3	+3	7		1–1p	—	—	1–0	—
4	Stranraer	4	1	1	0	2	9	5	+4	5		1–2	—	—	—	6–0
5	Berwick Rangers	4	0	0	0	4	0	21	−21	0		—	0–7	0–3	—	—

Rules for classification: 1) goal difference, 2) goals scored, 3) away goals scored, 4) matches won, 5) away matches won, 6) drawing of lots.

=== Scottish Challenge Cup ===
13 August 2019 Second round	Falkirk	1–1 (6–5 p)	Celtic U21	Falkirk
19:45	Longridge 10'; Gomis (yellow card) 85'	Report	Robertson 11' (yellow card) 56'	Stadium: Falkirk Stadium; Attendance: 1,706; Referee: David Dickinson

7 September 2019 Third round	Raith Rovers	2–0	Falkirk	Kirkcaldy
15:00	Hendry 17' (pen.) (yellow card) 35' (goal) 50' (pen.)	Report	Telfer (yellow card) 34'; Durnan (yellow card) 74'	Stadium: Stark's Park; Attendance: 1,771; Referee: Greg Aitken

=== Scottish Cup ===
22 November 2019 Third round	Linlithgow Rose	1–4	Falkirk	Linlithgow
19:05	Tommy Coyne 20'; Sam Collumbine (yellow card) 89'	Report	Sammon 8', 30'; Mutch (yellow card) 21'; McManus 78'; Dixon 86'	Stadium: Prestonfield; Attendance: 1,720; Referee: Grant Irvine

18 January 2020 Fourth round	Arbroath	0–0	Falkirk	Arbroath
15:00	Whatley (yellow card) 75'; Virtanen (yellow card) 77'; Michael McKenna (yellow card) 79'	Summary	Durnan (yellow card) 40'; Dixon (yellow card) 90+2'	Stadium: Gayfield Park; Attendance: 1,733; Referee: Greg Aitken

28 January 2020 Fourth Round Reply	Falkirk	2–0	Arbroath	Falkirk
19:45	McManus 47'; Sammon 66'; Doyle (yellow card) 77'	Report	Donnelly (yellow card) 61'	Stadium: Falkirk Stadium; Attendance: 2,704; Referee: Euan Anderson

8 February 2020 Fifth round	Falkirk	0–1	Heart of Midlothian	Falkirk
19:20	Miller (yellow card) 7'; Dixon (yellow card) 26'	Report	Clare (yellow card) 23' (goal) 50' (pen.); Irving (yellow card) 88'	Stadium: Falkirk Stadium; Attendance: 5,976; Referee: John Beaton

== Player statistics ==
As of 4 May 2019 (UTC)

No.	Pos	Nat	Player	Total		Championship		League Cup		Scottish Cup		Other	
No.	Pos	Nat	Player	Apps	Goals	Apps	Goals	Apps	Goals	Apps	Goals	Apps	Goals
2	DF	(Scotland) SCO	Michael Doyle	37	3	28+0	3	4+0	0	4+0	0	1+0	0
3	DF	(Scotland) SCO	Paul Dixon	37	2	28+0	1	4+0	0	4+0	1	1+0	0
4	DF	(Scotland) SCO	Gregor Buchanan	35	0	25+0	0	4+0	0	4+0	0	2+0	0
5	DF	(Scotland) SCO	Mark Durnan	30	2	21+1	2	3+0	0	4+0	0	1+0	0
6	MF	(Senegal) SEN	Morgaro Gomis	30	2	20+2	1	3+0	0	4+0	1	1+0	0
7	MF	(Scotland) SCO	Aidan Connolly	34	4	17+8	4	4+0	0	3+0	0	0+2	0
8	MF	(Scotland) SCO	Ian McShane	21	0	9+5	0	3+1	0	1+0	0	2+0	0
9	FW	(Scotland) SCO	Declan McManus	34	24	26+0	19	3+0	3	4+0	2	0+1	0
10	FW	(Scotland) SCO	Denny Johnstone	14	1	0+7	0	2+2	1	0+1	0	2+0	0
12	GK	(Scotland) SCO	Calum Ferrie	0	0	0+0	0	0+0	0	0+0	0	0+0	0
14	MF	(Scotland) SCO	Louis Longridge	28	6	18+6	5	0+0	0	1+1	0	2+0	1
15	DF	(Northern Ireland) NIR	Ben Hall	6	2	6+0	2	0+0	0	0+0	0	0+0	0
16	DF	(Scotland) SCO	Gary Miller	21	0	15+1	0	0+0	0	3+0	0	2+0	0
17	FW	(Scotland) SCO	Robbie Leitch	7	0	0+3	0	1+1	0	0+0	0	2+0	0
18	FW	(Republic of Ireland) IRL	Conor Sammon	35	10	17+10	6	1+1	1	4+0	3	0+2	0
19	MF	(England) ENG	Josh Todd	6	0	3+1	0	0+0	0	1+1	0	0+0	0
20	FW	(Scotland) SCO	Aidan Laverty	0	0	0+0	0	0+0	0	0+0	0	0+0	0
21	MF	(Scotland) SCO	Charlie Telfer	29	4	15+5	4	3+1	0	2+1	0	1+1	0
23	MF	(Italy) ITA	Raffaele De Vita	9	0	3+4	0	0+0	0	0+2	0	0+0	0
29	FW	(Republic of Ireland) IRL	David McMillan	22	4	12+7	4	0+0	0	0+3	0	0+0	0
31	GK	(Scotland) SCO	Robbie Mutch	26	0	17+1	0	2+0	0	4+0	0	2+0	0
99	FW	(Scotland) SCO	Lee Miller	4	1	1+3	1	0+0	0	0+0	0	0+0	0
Players who left the club during the 2019–20 season
1	GK	(Scotland) SCO	Cammy Bell	13	0	11+0	0	0+0	0	2+0	0	0+0	0
11	MF	(Scotland) SCO	Ross MacLean	11	0	0+7	0	1+1	0	0+1	0	1+0	0
12	MF	(Scotland) SCO	Michael Tidser	14	0	9+0	0	3+1	0	0+1	0	0+0	0
15	DF	(Scotland) SCO	Lewis Toshney	12	0	7+1	0	1+2	0	1+0	0	0+0	0
19	MF	(Scotland) SCO	Lewis Moore	4	0	0+2	0	0+0	0	0+0	0	2+0	0

== Team statistics ==
=== League table ===
Pos	Team	Pld	W	D	L	GF	GA	GD	Pts	PPG	Promotion, qualification or relegation (Note: All play-off matches were cancelled, as clubs voted to curtail the season due to the COVID-19 pandemic.)
1	Raith Rovers (C, P)	28	15	8	5	49	33	+16	53	1.89	Promotion to the Championship
2	Falkirk	28	14	10	4	54	18	+36	52	1.86	
3	Airdrieonians	28	14	6	8	38	27	+11	48	1.71	
4	Montrose	28	15	2	11	48	38	+10	47	1.68	
5	East Fife	28	12	9	7	44	36	+8	45	1.61	

Source: SPFL
Rules for classification: 1) Points per game.
(C) Champions; (P) Promoted

=== Division summary ===
Round	1	2	3	4	5	6	7	8	9	10	11	12	13	14	15	16	17	18	19	20	21	22	23	24	25	26	27	28
Ground	A	H	H	A	A	H	A	H	A	H	H	A	H	A	H	A	H	A	A	H	A	H	A	H	H	A	A	H
Result	D	W	W	L	D	W	W	D	D	W	L	W	L	D	W	D	D	W	D	W	W	W	D	W	W	L	D	W
Position	7	3	1	3	4	3	3	3	3	3	3	1	3	4	3	3	4	4	3	3	2	2	2	2	2	2	2	2

Updated to match(es) played on 15 April 2020. Source:
A = Away; H = Home; W = Win; D = Draw; L = Loss

== Transfers ==
=== Players in ===
Player	From	Fee
(Scotland) Gregor Buchanan	(Scotland) Greenock Morton	Free
(Scotland) Michael Tidser	(Scotland) Greenock Morton	Free
(Scotland) Aidan Connolly	(Scotland) Dunfermline Athletic	Free
(Senegal) Morgaro Gomis	(Scotland) Dundee United	Free
(Scotland) Charlie Telfer	(Scotland) Greenock Morton	Free
(Scotland) Cammy Bell	(Scotland) Partick Thistle	Free
(Scotland) Michael Doyle	(Scotland) Queen of the South	Free
(Scotland) Mark Durnan	(Scotland) Dunfermline Athletic	Free
(Republic of Ireland) Conor Sammon	(Scotland) Heart of Midlothian	Free
(Scotland) Robbie Leitch	(Croatia) NK Novigrad	Free
(Scotland) Lewis Toshney	(Scotland) Dundee United	Free
(Scotland) Denny Johnstone	(Scotland) Greenock Morton	Free
(Scotland) Declan McManus	(Scotland) Ross County	Loan
(Scotland) Louis Longridge	(Scotland) Dunfermline Athletic	Free
(Scotland) Lewis Moore	(Scotland) Heart of Midlothian	Loan
(Republic of Ireland) David McMillan	(Scotland) St Johnstone	Loan
(Italy) Raffaele De Vita	(Scotland) Livingston	Loan
(Northern Ireland) Ben Hall	(Scotland) Partick Thistle	Free
(England) Josh Todd	(Scotland) Dundee	Free
(Scotland) Calum Ferrie	(Scotland) Dundee	Loan

=== Players out ===
Player	To	Fee
(Italy) Leo Fasan	Unattached	Free
(Scotland) David Mitchell	(Scotland) Clyde	Free
(Scotland) Ciaran McKenna	(Scotland) Hamilton Academical	Free
(Northern Ireland) Paul Paton	(Scotland) Dunfermline Athletic	Free
(Scotland) Jordan McGhee	(Scotland) Dundee	Free
(England) Patrick Brough	(England) Barrow	Free
(Bulgaria) Nikolay Todorov	(Scotland) Inverness CT	Free
(England) Thomas Robson	(Scotland) Partick Thistle	Free
(Scotland) Lewis Kidd	(Scotland) Queen of the South	Free
(Lithuania) Deimantas Petravičius	(Kazakhstan) Okzhetpes	Free
(Scotland) Jason Jarvis	(Scotland) University of Stirling	Free
(Scotland) Kevin O'Hara	(Scotland) Alloa Athletic	Free
(Scotland) Cieran Dunne	(England) Sunderland	Free
(Ghana) Abdul Osman	(Scotland) Queen of the South	Free
(Scotland) Lewis Toshney	(Scotland) Inverness CT	Free
(Scotland) Ross MacLean	(Scotland) Queen's Park	Free
(Scotland) Robbie Leitch	(Scotland) Forfar Athletic	Loan
(Scotland) Michael Tidser	(Scotland) Kelty Hearts	Free
(Scotland) Cammy Bell	(Scotland) Queen's Park	Free

== See also ==
- List of Falkirk F.C. seasons
