= Langan =

Langan may refer to:

- Langan (surname)
- Ləngan, Azerbaijan
- Langan, Ille-et-Vilaine, France

== See also ==
- Langan's Brasserie, London restaurant
