= Langan (surname) =

Langan is a surname. Notable people with the surname include:

- Bill Langan (1955–2010), American yacht designer and naval architect
- Christine Langan (born 1965), English film producer
- Christopher Langan (born 1952), American known for high IQ
- Dan Langan, American baker
- Daniel Langan (1910–1985), Irish rugby player
- Darragh Langan (born 2005), Irish hurler
- Dave Langan (born 1957), Irish footballer
- Ezequiel Fernández Langan (born 1978), Argentine politician
- Gary Langan (born 1956), English audio engineer and record producer
- Glenn Langan (1917–1991), American actor
- Jamie Langan, Scottish politician
- John Langan (born 1969), American horror author
- Joseph N. Langan (1912–2004), American politician
- Joy Langan (1943–2009), member of the Canadian House of Commons
- Kevin Langan, (born 1955), American operatic bass
- Kevin Langan (born 1978), English footballer and coach
- Marese Langan, British makeup artist
- Mary Langan (born 1948), Irish nun
- Michael Langan, Irish Gaelic footballer
- Patrick Langan, American criminologist and statistician
- Peter Langan (1941–1988), Irish restaurateur
- Ruaridh Langan (born 1998), Scottish footballer
- Ruth Ryan Langan (born 1937), American romance author
- Sarah Langan (born 1974), American horror author
- Sean Langan (born 1964), British journalist and documentary filmmaker
- Thomas Langan (1929–2012), American philosopher
- Tom Langan, American television producer and writer
- Tommy Langan (1921–1974), Irish Gaelic footballer
