= 2019–20 Dumbarton F.C. season =

Dumbarton
2019–20 season
- Chairman: John Steele
- Manager: Jim Duffy
- Stadium: C&G Systems Stadium
- League One: 6th
- Challenge Cup: First round (lost to St Mirren Colts)
- League Cup: Group Stage
- Scottish Cup: Fourth round (lost to Aberdeen)
- Top goalscorer: League: Isaac Layne (8); All: Isaac Layne (9)
- Highest home attendance: 1394 (vs Motherwell, July 23, 2019)
- Lowest home attendance: 279 (vs St Mirren Colts, August 13, 2019)
- Average home league attendance: 663
Home colours	Away colours

Season 2019–20 was Dumbarton's second in the third tier of Scottish football having finished sixth in the division in 2018–19. Dumbarton also competed in the Challenge Cup, Scottish League Cup and the Scottish Cup.

== Story of the season ==
=== May ===
Dumbarton's first transfer business of the 2019–20 season saw defender Cammy Ballantyne leave the club for Montrose. Ballantyne was followed by Craig Barr and Brian McLean who turned down new deals, along with Grant Adam, Willie Dyer, Ross Perry, Michael Paton and Ryan Thomson who were released at the end of their contracts. After lengthy negotiations it was eventually revealed on 29 May that Jim Duffy would remain as the club's manager – having guided the club from a relegation battle to sixth place in Scottish League One the previous season. The same day the club were drawn against Motherwell. Greenock Morton, Queen of the South and Annan Athletic in the group stages of the 2019–20 Scottish League Cup. The following day club captain Ross Forbes departed for Forfar Athletic. On 31 May the club announced their first two signings of the summer – with Stefan McCluskey and Morgyn Neill signing from Pollok and Stenhousemuir respectively.

=== June ===
June opened with Bobby Barr leaving the club to join Lowland League outfit East Stirlingshire. Shortly after Kyle Hutton became the first member of the previous season's squad to sign-up for the new campaign, inking a new one-year deal. Meanwhile, friendlies were arranged for July with Dunfermline Athletic, Dundee United and Hamilton Academical. Jordan Pettigrew became the club's third signing of the summer, joining from Livingston and he was followed by midfielder Conor Scullion from Cumbernauld United and forward Ryan Tierney from Edusport Academy. Top scorer from the previous two season Calum Gallagher departed the club for Airdrieonians however. The following day Isaac Layne became the club's sixth new signing of the window whilst goalkeeper Conor Brennan also agreed a new deal. Player of the Year Stuart Carswell was next to renew his contract, penning a new one-year deal.

=== July ===
Defender Jordan McMillan was the club's next addition, signing on the same day as the club's first pre-season match with Dunfermline Athletic was cancelled. Defender Lewis Crawford was next to sign up, joining from junior side Petershill. He made his debut the following day, in a 3–2 victory against Dundee United with all three goals coming from trialists – Muhammadu Faal, Joe McKee and Mati Zata. The Sons final pre-season game ended in defeat, 2–0 to a young Hamilton Academical side. On 11 July, just two days before the start of the Scottish League Cup, Duffy added four players: Mati Zata, Ruaridh Langan, PJ Crossan and Rico Quitongo to his squad. The club's new kit was revealed the following day, with a return to a yellow and black home kit after seven seasons in white and gold. Ryan McGeever then became the Sons 13th signing of the summer. The competitive season started with a 1–0 victory against Annan Athletic with Ryan Tierney scoring the only goal of the game. On Monday 15 July Matthew Shiels became the club's first loan signing of the summer, joining on a deal until January 2020. After a heavy defeat to Greenock Morton in the Scottish League Cup Duffy moved into the transfer market again – signing Joe McKee on a one-year deal. The League Cup campaign ended with defeats to Queen of the South and Motherwell.

=== August ===
Before the start of the new season Rory Loy left the club having not made an appearance for 11 months following a serious back injury. The Sons league season opened with a 1–0 defeat to Raith Rovers. A heavy defeat to Falkirk followed, before a humiliating defeat to St Mirren under-21s in the Scottish Challenge Cup. The Sons recorded their first victory of the new season on 17 August, coming from 2–0 down to defeat Peterhead 3–2 at Balmoor Stadium thanks to goals from Ruaridh Langan, PJ Crossan and Isaac Layne. Prior to the next game against Stranraer Reghan Tumilty became the club's 16th signing of the summer, joining on loan until January from Greenock Morton. Tumility scored his first goal for the club in the afternoon, with Layne continuing his good from with a brace as Sons recorded a first home win of the campaign. The game also marked Stuart Carswell's 100th Dumbarton appearance. The month ended with a 2–1 victory against Montrose, where Layne again scored a double.

=== September ===
September opened with defeat to Airdrieonians. That was followed by a 2–2 draw with East Fife where Ryan McGeever scored his first goal for the club, with Isaac Layne taking his total to six for the season from the penalty spot. A defeat to Clyde followed, before Adam Frizzell became the club's 17th signing of the summer – joining on loan from Kilmarnock.

=== October ===
Frizzell made his debut in a 3–1 victory against Forfar Athletic where he scored twice, meaning that the Sons ended the first quarter of the season in fifth place with 13 points from their first nine games. Two more positive results followed to ensure that the Sons ended the month undefeated, a 0–0 draw with Stranraer and a 1–0 victory against Peterhead with Ryan McGeever scoring his second goal of the campaign.

=== November ===
November began with a 3–1 defeat to Airdrieonians, with Calum Gallagher giving the hosts the lead after just 27 seconds. Another defeat followed, this time by four goals to two at home to East Fife. A 1–1 draw with Falkirk saw Isaac Layne score for the first time since September – with his 30th-minute strike being cancelled out by Declan McManus's injury time penalty. Before the next game Lewis Crawford and Mati Zata left the club on loan, joining Junior side Rossvale until January.

=== December ===
A 2–0 home defeat to Montrose opened December, before a 4–3 comeback victory against Forfar Athletic where Sons had been 1–0, 2–1 and 3–2 down but came back to win with strikes from Joe McKee, Reghan Tumilty and a PJ Crossan brace. Defender Jordan McMillan was next leave, joining Pollok on a short-term loan, before the Sons defeated table-topping Raith Rovers at Stark's Park with goals from Crossan and Ryan McGeever. The year ended with a 1–1 draw against Stranraer where the Sons were able to name just one outfield sub. Ryan Tierney, on his first start since August, got the goal.

=== January ===
January began with Mati Zata and Lewis Crawford being recalled from their loan spell with Rossvale after an injury crisis left the duo as the only outfield substitutes for the 3–0 defeat to Falkirk. Dumbarton's squad then took another hit when defender Reghan Tumilty returned to Greenock Morton at the end of his loan spell. The following week a waterlogged pitch caused the postponement of a home tie with Clyde. Callum Wilson became the first signing of the winter window, joining from Partick Thistle. A controversial late penalty then saw the Sons exit the Scottish Cup at the hands of Aberdeen. Sam Wardrop became the club's second signing of the window, joining for a second loan spell on 23 January – this time on a temporary deal from Dundee United until the end of the season. Wardrop debuted two days later in a 1–0 defeat to Peterhead that left the Sons without a win, or a goal, in the month of January. After the match Jim Duffy confirmed that winger Conor Scullion was to leave the club. Two days later assistant manager Craig McPherson left the club and was replaced by former Dundee manager Barry Smith. Jai Quitongo became the club's second signing of the winter, joining after leaving Persian Gulf Pro League side Machine Sazi. The month ended with defender Jordan McMillan leaving the club and striker Robert Jones joining from Stranraer. On deadline day Ross Forbes returned to the club from Forfar Athletic.

=== February ===
Jones opened his account for the Sons on his debut in a 4–2 defeat to East Fife. That was followed by a 0–0 home draw against Airdrieonians in the club's first home game of 2020. The winless run continued into mid-February after a 2–1 defeat to Montrose but was finally ended on 25 February with a 1–0 victory against Clyde where Morgyn Neill got the only goal. That was followed up by another victory, with Stuart Carswell scoring an injury time winner at home to Raith Rovers.

=== March ===
March opened with a 2–0 victory against Forfar Athletic where Ross Forbes scored his first goal since returning to the club, and Jai Quitongo also scored his first for the Sons. A 2–0 defeat to Clyde ended the unbeaten run four days later. On Friday 13 March all Scottish football was suspended indefinitely due to the coronavirus pandemic. A week later midfielder Mati Zata left the club whilst chairman John Steele admitted the pandemic presented a risk to the club's future.

=== April ===
Having not played since early March, and with football suspended until at least June, the decision was taken to end the 2019–20 season on 15 April, with the Sons sitting sixth in Scottish League One.

=== May ===
At a virtual player of the year awards ceremony held on 2 May, Kyle Hutton was named as the club's Player of the Season and Players' Player of the Season, whilst Rico Quitongo was named Young Player of the Season.

== First team transfers ==
- From end of 2018–19 season, to last match of season 2019–20

=== In ===
Player	From	League	Fee
(Scotland) Stefan McCluskey	Pollok	SJFA West Region Premiership	Free
(Scotland) Morgyn Neill	Stenhousemuir	Scottish League Two	Free
(Scotland) Jordan Pettigrew	Livingston	Scottish Premiership	Free
(Scotland) Conor Scullion	Cumbernauld United	SJFA West Region Premiership	Free
(Scotland) Ryan Tierney	Edusport Academy	Scottish Lowland League	Free
(England) Isaac Layne	Free agent	N/A	Free
(Scotland) Jordan McMillan	Edusport Academy	Scottish Lowland League	Free
(Scotland) Lewis Crawford	Petershill	SJFA West Region Premiership	Free
(Zimbabwe) Mati Zata	Dundee United	Scottish Championship	Free
(Scotland) Rico Quitongo	Heart of Midlothian	Scottish Premiership	Free
(Scotland) PJ Crossan	Celtic	Scottish Premiership	Free
(Scotland) Ruaridh Langan	Falkirk	Scottish Championship	Free
(Scotland) Ryan McGeever	Brechin City	Scottish League One	Free
(Scotland) Matthew Shiels	Rangers	Scottish Premiership	Loan
(Scotland) Joe McKee	Falkirk	Scottish League One	Free
(Scotland) Reghan Tumilty	Greenock Morton	Scottish Championship	Loan
(Scotland) Adam Frizzell	Kilmarnock	Scottish Premiership	Loan
(Scotland) Callum Wilson	Partick Thistle	Scottish Championship	Free
(Scotland) Sam Wardrop	Dundee United	Scottish Championship	Loan
(Scotland) Jai Quitongo	Machine Sazi	Persian Gulf Pro League	Free
(Scotland) Robert Jones	Stranraer	Scottish League One	Free
(Scotland) Ross Forbes	Forfar Athletic	Scottish League One	Free

=== Out ===
Player	To	League	Fee
(Scotland) Cammy Ballantyne	Montrose	Scottish League One	Free
(Scotland) Craig Barr	Cowdenbeath	Scottish League Two	Free
(Scotland) Grant Adam	Downfield	SJFA North Region Superleague	Free
(Northern Ireland) Brian McLean	Greenock Morton	Scottish Championship	Free
(Scotland) Ross Perry	Darvel	SJFA West Region Championship	Free
(Scotland) Michael Paton	Queen of the South	Scottish Championship	Free
(Scotland) Ryan Thomson	Stranraer	Scottish League One	Free
(Scotland) Willie Dyer	East Stirlingshire	Scottish Lowland League	Free
(Scotland) Ross Forbes	Forfar Athletic	Scottish League One	Free
(Scotland) Bobby Barr	East Stirlingshire	Scottish Lowland League	Free
(Scotland) Calum Gallagher	Airdrieonians	Scottish League One	Free
(Scotland) Iain Russell	Pollok	SJFA West Region Premiership	Free
(Scotland) Rory Loy	Free agent		Free
(France) Boris Melingui	Free agent		Free
(Scotland) Lewis Crawford	Rossvale	SJFA West Region Premiership	Loan
(Zimbabwe) Mati Zata	Rossvale	SJFA West Region Premiership	Loan
(Scotland) Jordan McMillan	Pollok	SJFA West Region Premiership	Loan
(Scotland) Conor Scullion	Fauldhouse United	East of Scotland Football League	Free
(Scotland) Jordan McMillan	Pollok	SJFA West Region Premiership	Free
(Zimbabwe) Mati Zata	Bo'ness Athletic F.C.	East of Scotland Football League	Free

== Fixtures and results ==
Win Draw Loss Upcoming fixture

=== Friendlies ===
6 July 2019 Friendly	Dumbarton	3–2	Dundee United	Dumbarton
15:00	Muhammadu Faal (T) 48', Joe McKee (T) 65', Mati Zata (T) 80'	Report	Lawrence Shankland 58', Louis Appéré 77'	Stadium: Dumbarton Football Stadium; Referee: Alan Newlands

9 July 2019 Friendly	Dumbarton	0–2	Hamilton Academical	Dumbarton
19:30		Report	Cunningham 2', Breen 44'	Stadium: Dumbarton Football Stadium; Referee: Colin Steven

=== Scottish League One ===
3 August 2019 League One	Dumbarton	0–1	Raith Rovers	Dumbarton Football Stadium
15:00		Report	Grant Anderson 79'	Attendance: 870; Referee: Duncan Williams; Man of the Match: Stefan McCluskey

10 August 2019 League One	Falkirk	6–0	Dumbarton	Falkirk Stadium
15:00	Conor Sammon 7', 53', Declan McManus 11', 34', 42', Charlie Telfer 38'	Report		Attendance: 4.060; Referee: Graham Beaton

17 August 2019 League One	Peterhead	2–3	Dumbarton	Balmoor Stadium
15:00	Gary Fraser 3', Jason Brown 36'	Report	Ruaridh Langan 42', PJ Crossan 68', Isaac Layne 79'	Attendance: 688; Referee: David Dickinson

24 August 2019 League One	Dumbarton	3–1	Stranraer	Dumbarton Football Stadium
15:00	Isaac Layne 25' 76', Reghan Tumilty 63'	Report	Leon Murphy 20'	Attendance: 583; Referee: Barry Cook; Man of the Match: Isaac Layne

31 August 2019 League One	Montrose	1–2	Dumbarton	Links Park
15:00	Blair Lyons 75'	Report	Isaac Layne 21' 34'	Attendance: 480; Referee: Peter Stuart

14 September 2019 League One	Dumbarton	0–1	Airdrieonians	Dumbarton Football Stadium
15:00		Report	Paul McKay 44'	Attendance: 813; Referee: Steven Kirkland; Man of the Match: Kyle Hutton

21 September 2019 League One	East Fife	2–2	Dumbarton	Bayview Stadium
15:00	Stewart Murdoch 58', Scott Agnew 73' (pen.)	Report	Ryan McGeever 38', Isaac Layne 48' (pen.)	Attendance: 719; Referee: Lloyd Wilson

28 September 2019 League One	Dumbarton	1–2	Clyde	Dumbarton Football Stadium
15:00	PJ Crossan 41'	Report	Chris McStay 61' Chris Johnston 75'	Attendance: 851; Referee: Steven Reid; Man of the Match: Stuart Carswell

5 October 2019 League One	Dumbarton	3–1	Forfar Athletic	Dumbarton Football Stadium
15:00	Morgyn Neill 11', Adam Frizzell 28' 34'	Report	Jordan Kirkpatrick 48'	Attendance: 532; Referee: David Dickinson; Man of the Match: Adam Frizzell

19 October 2019 League One	Stranraer	0–0	Dumbarton	Stair Park
15:00		Report		Attendance: 289; Referee: Steven Reid

26 October 2019 League One	Dumbarton	1–0	Peterhead	Dumbarton Football Stadium
15:00	Ryan McGeever 54'	Report		Attendance: 600; Referee: Steven Kirkland; Man of the Match: Ryan McGeever

2 November 2019 League One	Airdrieonians	3–1	Dumbarton	Excelsior Stadium
15:00	Calum Gallagher 1', Dale Carrick 35' 39'	Report	Reghan Tumilty 16'	Attendance: 727; Referee: Craig Napier; Man of the Match: Dale Carrick

9 November 2019 League One	Dumbarton	2–4	East Fife	Dumbarton Football Stadium
15:00	Ryan McGeever 33', OG 38'	Report	Danny Denholm 8', Liam Watt 30' 65', Steven Boyd 54'	Attendance: 702; Referee: Chris Graham; Man of the Match: Kyle Hutton

16 November 2019 League One	Dumbarton	1–1	Falkirk	Dumbarton Football Stadium
15:00	Isaac Layne 30'	Report	Declan McManus 90' (pen.)	Attendance: 982; Referee: Barry Cook; Man of the Match: Kyle Hutton

30 November 2019 League One	Clyde	1–2	Dumbarton	Broadwood Stadium
15:00	Chris Johnston 7'	Report	Joe McKee 17', Isaac Layne 48'	Attendance: 721; Referee: Chris Graham

7 December 2019 League One	Dumbarton	0–2	Montrose	Dumbarton Football Stadium
15:00		Report	Andrew Steeves 35', OG 76'	Attendance: 459; Referee: David Munro

14 December 2019 League One	Forfar Athletic	3–4	Dumbarton	Station Park
15:00	Michael Travis 2' 29', Dale Hilson 45' (pen.)	Report	Joe McKee 22', PJ Crossan 44', 73', Reghan Tumilty 58'	Attendance: 431; Referee: Scott Lambie; Man of the Match: Michael Travis

21 December 2019 League One	Raith Rovers	0–2	Dumbarton	Stark's Park
15:00		Report	PJ Crossan 28', Ryan McGeever 41'	Attendance: 1504; Referee: Alan Muir

28 December 2019 League One	Dumbarton	1–1	Stranraer	Dumbarton Football Stadium
15:00	Ryan Tierney 85'	Report	James Hilton 88'	Attendance: 656; Referee: Barry Cook; Man of the Match: Kyle Hutton

4 January 2020 League One	Falkirk	3–0	Dumbarton	Falkirk Stadium
15:00	Charlie Telfer 38', Declan McManus 63' 85'	Report		Attendance: 3807; Referee: Euan Anderson; Man of the Match: Morgaro Gomis

26 January 2020 League One	Peterhead	1–0	Dumbarton	Balmoor Stadium
15:00	Ben Armour 82'	Report		Attendance: 531; Referee: Steven Kirkland

1 February 2020 League One	East Fife	4–2	Dumbarton	Bayview Stadium
15:00	Scott Agnew 4' 79', Chris Higgins 27', Stewart Murdoch 70'	Report	Morgyn Neill 45+3', Robert Jones 59'	Attendance: 536; Referee: Gavin Duncan

8 February 2020 League One	Dumbarton	0–0	Airdrieonians	Dumbarton Football Stadium
15:00		Report		Attendance: 594; Referee: Lloyd Wilson

15 February 2020 League One	Montrose	2–1	Dumbarton	Links Park
15:00	Blair Lyons 16', Graham Webster 54'	Report	PJ Crossan 90+2'	Attendance: 423; Referee: Duncan Williams

25 February 2020 League One	Dumbarton	1–0	Clyde	Dumbarton Football Stadium
15:00	Morgyn Neill 67'	Report		Attendance: 468; Referee: Lloyd Wilson; Man of the Match: Morgyn Neill

29 February 2020 League One	Dumbarton	1–0	Raith Rovers	Dumbarton Football Stadium
15:00	Stuart Carswell 90+3'	Report		Attendance: 804; Referee: Kevin Graham; Man of the Match: Ryan McGeever

3 March 2020 League One	Dumbarton	2–0	Forfar Athletic	Dumbarton Football Stadium
15:00	Ross Forbes 33', Jai Quitongo 69'	Report		Attendance: 364; Referee: Barry Cook; Man of the Match: Ross Forbes

7 March 2020 League One	Clyde	2–0	Dumbarton	Broadwood Stadium
15:00	David Goodwillie 49', John Rankin 90'	Report		Attendance: 767; Referee: Alan Muir

=== Scottish Cup ===
23 November 2019 Third round	Dumbarton	3–1	Forfar Athletic	Dumbarton Football Stadium
15:00	Adam Frizzell 9', Ryan McGeever 72', Isaac Layne 78'	Report	Callum Tapping 20'	Attendance: 424; Referee: Chris Fordyce

18 January 2020 Fourth round	Aberdeen	1–0	Dumbarton	Aberdeen
15:00	Sam Cosgrove 86' (pen.)	Report		Stadium: Pittodrie Stadium; Attendance: 10,010; Referee: Gavin Duncan

=== Scottish League Cup ===
==== Table ====
Pos	Team	Pld	W	PW	PL	L	GF	GA	GD	Pts	Qualification	MOT	GMO	QOS	DUM	ANN
1	Motherwell	4	4	0	0	0	13	0	+13	12	Qualification for the Second Round	—	4–0	—	—	4–0
2	Greenock Morton	4	2	1	0	1	14	8	+6	8	Qualification for the Second Round	—	—	p3–3	6–1	—
3	Queen of the South	4	1	1	1	1	10	10	0	6		0–3	—	—	—	p3–3
4	Dumbarton	4	1	0	0	3	3	12	−9	3		0–2	—	1–4	—	—
5	Annan Athletic	4	0	0	1	3	3	13	−10	1		—	0–5	—	0–1	—

Rules for classification: 1) goal difference, 2) goals scored, 3) away goals scored, 4) matches won, 5) away matches won, 6) drawing of lots.

==== Matches ====
13 July 2018 Group stage	Annan Athletic	0–1	Dumbarton	Annan
15:00		Report	Ryan Tierney 63'	Stadium: Galabank Stadium; Attendance: 264; Referee: Steven Kirkland

16 July 2018 Group stage	Greenock Morton	6–1	Dumbarton	Greenock
19:45	OG 15', Peter Grant 17', Kyle Jacobs 23', Lewis Strapp 31', John Sutton 45', Bob McHugh 69'	Report	Morgyn Neill 63'	Stadium: Cappielow Park; Attendance: 1,257

20 July 2018 Group stage	Dumbarton	1–4	Queen of the South	Dumbarton
15:00	PJ Crossan 8'	Report	Michael Paton 10', Gary Oliver 13', Stephen Dobbie 18', Connor Murray 22'	Stadium: Dumbarton Football Stadium; Attendance: 580; Referee: Gavin Duncan

27 July 2018 Group stage	Dumbarton	0–2	Motherwell	Dumbarton
15:00		Report	Christian Ilić 42', Peter Hartley 76'	Stadium: Dumbarton Football Stadium; Attendance: 1,394; Referee: Colin Steven

=== Scottish Challenge Cup ===
13 August 2019 2nd round	Dumbarton	0–1	St Mirren U21s	Dumbarton
19:45		Report	Josh Jacks 31'	Stadium: Dumbarton Football Stadium; Attendance: 279; Referee: Craig Napier

== Player statistics ==
As of 22:28, 7 March 2020

=== All competitions ===
#	Position	Player	Starts	Subs	Unused subs	Goals	Red cards (red card)	Yellow cards (yellow card)
1	GK	(Northern Ireland) Conor Brennan	32	0	3	0	0	3
6	MF	(Scotland) Stuart Carswell	30	1	1	1	0	12
2	DF	(Scotland) Lewis Crawford	10	4	12	0	0	2
24	FW	(Scotland) PJ Crossan	26	6	1	6	0	2
18	MF	(Scotland) Adam Frizzell	10	0	0	3	0	1
11	MF	(Scotland) Ross Forbes	6	1	0	1	0	2
8	MF	(Scotland) Kyle Hutton	27	1	1	0	0	4
15	FW	(Scotland) Robert Jones	4	3	0	1	0	2
4	MF	(Scotland) Ruaridh Langan	17	11	7	1	0	2
17	FW	(England) Isaac Layne	17	7	0	9	0	3
33	FW	(Scotland) Rory Loy	0	0	0	0	0	0
10	MF	(Scotland) Stefan McCluskey	24	7	0	0	0	5
22	DF	(Scotland) Ryan McGeever	32	1	0	5	0	3
14	MF	(Scotland) Joe McKee	28	0	0	2	0	3
23	DF	(Scotland) Jordan McMillan	5	6	6	0	0	1
5	DF	(Scotland) Morgyn Neill	35	0	0	4	0	4
12	GK	(Scotland) Jordan Pettigrew	3	0	32	0	0	0
7	FW	(Scotland) Jai Quitongo	3	3	1	1	0	3
3	DF	(Scotland) Rico Quitongo	30	1	0	0	0	4
11	MF	(Scotland) Conor Scullion	6	8	8	0	0	0
7	DF	(Scotland) Matthew Shiels	4	5	5	0	0	0
9	FW	(Scotland) Ryan Tierney	9	12	11	2	0	0
15	DF	(Scotland) Reghan Tumilty	17	0	0	3	0	4
25	DF	(Scotland) Sam Wardrop	7	0	0	0	0	1
20	MF	(Scotland) Callum Wilson	2	2	5	0	0	0
16	MF	(Zimbabwe) Mati Zata	4	5	12	0	0	0

=== Captains ===
No.	P	Name	Country	No. games	Notes
6	MF	Stuart Carswell	(Scotland)	30	
8	MF	Kyle Hutton	(Scotland)	5	

Last updated: As of match played 7 March 2020
Source: Competitive match reports.
Competitive matches only
Matches started as captain only
Country: FIFA nationality; No.: Squad number; P: Position; Name: Player name; No. Games: Number of games started as captain.

== League table ==
Pos	Team	Pld	W	D	L	GF	GA	GD	Pts	PPG	Promotion, qualification or relegation (Note: All play-off matches were cancelled, as clubs voted to curtail the season due to the COVID-19 pandemic.)
4	Montrose	28	15	2	11	48	38	+10	47	1.68	
5	East Fife	28	12	9	7	44	36	+8	45	1.61	
6	Dumbarton	28	11	5	12	35	44	−9	38	1.36	
7	Clyde	28	9	7	12	35	43	−8	34	1.21	
8	Peterhead	27	7	5	15	30	44	−14	26	0.96	

Source: SPFL
Rules for classification: 1) Points per game.
