= Paul Crossan =

Paul Crossan may refer to:

- PJ Crossan (born 1998), Scottish footballer
- Rick O'Shea (Paul Crossan, born 1973), Irish radio personality
