= James Wallace (footballer, born 2000) =

Scottish footballer

Personal information
- Date of birth: 29 August 2000 (age 26)
- Place of birth: Inverness, Scotland
- Position: Forward

Team information
- Current team: Brora Rangers
- Number: 11

Youth career
- –2018: Ross County

Senior career*
Years	Team	Apps	(Gls)
2018–2020	Ross County	1	(0)
2019–2020	→ Brora Rangers (loan)		
2020–2022	Greenock Morton	0	(0)
2021	→ Dumbarton (loan)	10	(0)
2022–	Brora Rangers		
- * Club domestic league appearances and goals as of 22:48, 29 June 2022(UTC)

James Wallace (born 29 August 2000) is a Scottish professional footballer who plays as a forward for Highland League club Brora Rangers. He made his League debut for Ross County against Partick Thistle in the Scottish Championship, coming on as a substitute for Josh Mullin.

== Career ==
In September 2020, after departing Ross County earlier in the year, Wallace signed with Scottish Championship club Greenock Morton. He joined Scottish League One side Dumbarton on loan in March 2021.

== Career statistics ==
As of 22:48, 17 May 2021 (UTC)

Appearances and goals by club, season and competition
Club	Season	League			Cup		League Cup		Other		Total	
Club	Season	Division	Apps	Goals	Apps	Goals	Apps	Goals	Apps	Goals	Apps	Goals
Ross County Under 20s	2016–17	—	0	0	0	0	0	0	1 (Note: Appearances in the Scottish Challenge Cup)	1	1	1
Ross County Under 20s	2017–18	—	0	0	0	0	0	0	2	0	2	0
Ross County Under 20s	2019–20	—	0	0	0	0	0	0	2	0	2	0
Ross County Under 20s	Total		0	0	0	0	0	0	5	1	5	1
Ross County	2018–19	Scottish Championship	1	0	1	0	0	0	1	0	3	0
Brora Rangers (loan)	2019–20	Highland Football League	—	—	3	1	—	—	—	—	3	1
Greenock Morton	2020–21	Scottish Championship	0	0	0	0	2	0	0	0	2	0
Dumbarton (loan)	2020–21	Scottish League One	10	0	0	0	0	0	3	0	13	0
Career total			13	0	4	1	2	0	9	1	26	2
