= Sam Wardrop =

Scottish footballer

Personal information
- Full name: Sam Wardrop
- Date of birth: 20 October 1997 (age 29)
- Place of birth: Glasgow, Scotland
- Position: Defender

Youth career
- –2017: Celtic

Senior career*
Years	Team	Apps	(Gls)
2017–2018	Celtic	0	(0)
2017–2018	→ Dumbarton (loan)	22	(1)
2018–2020	Dundee United	1	(0)
2020	→ Dumbarton (loan)	7	(0)
2020–2021	Dumbarton	17	(0)
2021	Airdrieonians	2	(0)
2024	Ljungskile SK	6	(0)

International career
2012	Scotland U16	6	(1)
2013–2014	Scotland U17	11	(0)
2015–2016	Scotland U19	2	(0)
- * Club domestic league appearances and goals as of 18:09, 13 September 2021 (UTC)

Sam Wardrop (born 20 October 1997) is a Scottish footballer, who last played as a defender for Ettan Fotboll club Ljungskile SK. His previous clubs include Celtic, Dundee United and Dumbarton.

== Career ==
Wardrop started his career at Celtic, and captained the club's Under-20s to victory in the 2017 Scottish Youth Cup final.

On 1 August 2017, Wardrop joined Scottish Championship club Dumbarton on loan, until May 2018. He scored his first senior goal, the winner, against Inverness Caledonian Thistle in September 2017.

Wardrop signed a two-year contract with Dundee United on 31 May 2018. After suffering an injury that ruled out a potential loan return to Dumbarton in January 2019, he rejoined the club on loan in January 2020 playing seven times prior to the season being ended early by the COVID-19 pandemic.

Wardrop was then released by United in May 2020 and signed a permanent contract with Dumbarton. He left the club after one season in June 2021 and subsequently signed a one-year contract with Airdrieonians but left just two months into the season for personal reasons.

In 2024, after documenting his return to professional football on social media, he agreed a deal with Swedish Ettan Fotboll club Ljungskile SK.

== International career ==
Wardrop was selected for the Scotland U17 team in the UEFA under-17 Championship in 2014, where the Netherlands beat them in the semi-finals.

He was selected for the under-20 squad in the 2017 Toulon Tournament. After a historic first ever win against Brazil, which was at any level. Scotland later won the bronze medal. It was the nations first ever medal at the competition.

== Personal life ==
Wardrop attended Bearsden Academy.

After leaving professional football in 2021, Sam set up his own business offering football and fitness coaching to young players alongside fellow Celtic academy graduate Aidan Nesbitt. In 2023, he began documenting his return to professional football through a series of vlogs on his social media accounts, including training sessions in the United Arab Emirates, Australia and Sweden where he eventually signed a contract with Ljungskile SK.

== Career statistics ==
As of match played 13 September 2021

Appearances and goals by club, season and competition
Club	Season	League			Scottish Cup		League Cup		Other		Total	
Club	Season	Division	Apps	Goals	Apps	Goals	Apps	Goals	Apps	Goals	Apps	Goals
Celtic	2016–17	Scottish Premiership	0	0	0	0	0	0	0	0	0	0
Celtic	2017–18	Scottish Premiership	0	0	0	0	0	0	0	0	0	0
Celtic	Total		0	0	0	0	0	0	0	0	0	0
Celtic U20	2016–17		—		—		—		3 (Note: Appearances in Scottish Challenge Cup)	0	3	0
Dumbarton (loan)	2017–18	Scottish Championship	22	1	1	0	0	0	4	0	27	1
Dundee United	2018–19	Scottish Championship	1	0	0	0	3	0	2	0	6	0
Dundee United	2019–20	Scottish Championship	0	0	0	0	0	0	0	0	0	0
Dundee United	Total		1	0	0	0	3	0	2	0	6	0
Dumbarton	2019–20	Scottish League One	7	0	0	0	0	0	0	0	7	0
Dumbarton	2020–21	Scottish League One	17	0	2	0	4	0	0	0	23	0
Dumbarton	Total		24	0	2	0	4	0	0	0	30	0
Airdrieonians	2021–22	Scottish League One	2	0	0	0	4	0	1	0	7	0
Career total			49	1	3	0	11	0	10	0	72	1
