= Rabin Omar =

Iraqi-Dutch footballer

Personal information
- Date of birth: 21 July 1997 (age 29)
- Place of birth: Delft, Netherlands
- Height: 1.76 m (5 ft 9 1/2 in)
- Positions: Midfielder; winger

Youth career
- Vitesse Delft
- ADO Den Haag
- -2014: Partick Thistle

Senior career*
Years	Team	Apps	(Gls)
2014–2018	Annan Athletic	105	(9)
2018–2020	Elgin City	49	(6)
2020–2021	Greenock Morton	11	(0)
2021	→ Dumbarton (loan)	11	(1)
2021–2022	Stirling Albion	7	(0)
2022	Elgin City	12	(1)
2022–2023	East Fife	4	(0)
2023–2024	Broomhill	13	(0)
2024	→ Troon (loan)		
- * Club domestic league appearances and goals as of 23 December 2023

Rabin Omar (born 21 July 1997) is an Iraqi-Dutch professional footballer. Omar has previously played for Annan Athletic, Greenock Morton, Dumbarton, Stirling Albion, Elgin City, East Fife, Broomhill and Troon.

== Personal life ==
Born in Delft, Netherlands, Omar is of Iraqi descent.

Omar has a degree in Pharmacology from the University of Glasgow.

== Career ==
After playing for four seasons in Scottish League Two with Annan Athletic, Omar left to join divisional rivals Elgin City. Two seasons later, Omar made the step-up to the Scottish Championship with Greenock Morton on 5 August 2020.

Omar made his Morton debut in the Scottish League Cup draw against Queen of the South.

In March 2021, Omar joined Scottish League One side Dumbarton on loan until the end of the season.

On 30 June 2021, Omar signed for Scottish League Two side Stirling Albion.

On 7 January 2022, Omar rejoined Elgin City for a second spell.

2022–2023 season he joined East Fife and made his long await East Fife debut after a long injury comeback against Forfar Athletic at home on 4 March 2023 in a 3–2 victory as a substitute with 10 minutes remaining.
