= Charlie Telfer =

Scottish footballer

Personal information
- Date of birth: 4 July 1995 (age 31)
- Place of birth: Carluke, Scotland
- Position: Midfielder

Team information
- Current team: Airdrieonians
- Number: 23

Youth career
- 2003–2014: Rangers

Senior career*
| Years | Team | Apps | (Gls) |
| 2013–2014 | Rangers | 1 | (0) |
| 2014–2017 | Dundee United | 53 | (4) |
| 2016 | → Livingston (loan) | 13 | (0) |
| 2017–2018 | Almere City | 8 | (0) |
| 2018–2019 | Greenock Morton | 29 | (5) |
| 2019–2022 | Falkirk | 69 | (13) |
| 2022–2024 | Airdrieonians | 60 | (5) |
| 2024–2025 | Ross County | 7 | (0) |
| 2025 | → Hamilton Academical (loan) | 8 | (0) |
| 2025– | Airdrieonians | 30 | (1) |

International career^{‡}
| 2011–2012 | Scotland U17 | 6 | (1) |
| 2013–2014 | Scotland U19 | 5 | (0) |
| 2015 | Scotland U21 | 1 | (0) |
- * Club domestic league appearances and goals as of 4 May 2026 ‡ National team caps and goals as of 18 June 2018

Charlie Telfer (born 4 July 1995) is a Scottish midfielder who plays for side Airdrieonians

== Early life ==
Telfer was born in Carluke and grew up supporting Rangers. He joined the club as a youth player after being spotted at a Football in the Community course at Bell College, Hamilton, when he was eight.

== Club career ==
=== Rangers ===
After progressing through the Rangers academy, Telfer signed his first professional contract with the club in November 2011. He would make one competitive first team appearance for the club against Stenhousemuir in April 2014. On 13 May 2014, he was in the Rangers side that won the Scottish Youth Cup beating Hearts 8–7 on penalties following a 2–2 draw, at St Mirren Park. Telfer later describe playing in the Scottish Youth Cup Final as his biggest game of his life.

At the end of the 2013–14 season, Telfer's future at Rangers appeared to be in doubt when Dundee United were reported to be keen to sign him. Dundee United then made a £50,000 bid to sign Telfer, which was rejected by Rangers, who offered him a new contract.

=== Dundee United ===
After rejecting the offer of a new contract with Rangers, Telfer signed for Dundee United in June 2014, with a compensation payment still to be agreed between the clubs. Telfer's departure from Rangers was commented on by the club's manager Ally McCoist, who described him as a "great prospect" and said that the club had wanted to keep him but it had been Telfer's decision to leave. The level of compensation to be paid was set by an independent tribunal, with Dundee United paying £200,000 to Rangers in January 2015.

He made his Dundee United debut as a substitute against Aberdeen in the opening match of the 2014–15 season, and scored his first goal for the club in a 3–0 win over St Mirren on 1 November 2014. Telfer was named as SPFL Young Player of the Month for November 2014. On 1 January 2015 he scored United's sixth goal in a 6–2 Dundee derby victory over local rivals Dundee. This was followed by two goals against Motherwell later that month. Telfer was a substitute for the 2015 Scottish League Cup Final, but was unused as Dundee United lost 2–0 to Celtic. He made 25 appearances and scored 4 times in his first season at the club.

Having been unable to gain a regular place in the Dundee United team, Telfer moved on loan to Scottish Championship side Livingston in January 2016 until the end of the 2015–16 season.

Telfer was released by United on 5 June 2017.

=== Almere City ===
Telfer signed for Dutch club Almere City in August 2017 on a one-year contract.

He had been training with Dumbarton and Bolton Wanderers; rejecting a contract at the Macron Stadium to move to the Netherlands.

=== Greenock Morton ===
Telfer signed a one-year contract with Scottish Championship club Greenock Morton in June 2018. He went on to make 29 league appearances, 24 of them in the starting line-up. Morton manager Jonatan Johansson and his assistant Peter Houston walked out on the club before the final game of the season in May 2019, claiming that chairman Crawford Rae had told them not to select Telfer, as one further appearance would trigger an automatic contract extension. Rae subsequently suggested that Telfer could still be offered a new contract once a replacement manager was appointed.

=== Falkirk ===
On 18 June 2019, Telfer signed for Falkirk on a two-year contract. At the end an injury-hit 2020–21 season, Telfer signed a further one-year contract with the club. After three years at Falkirk, he left at the end of his contract in May 2022.

=== Airdrieonians ===
Following a trial spell with Airdrieonians, Telfer signed a contract with the club in September 2022. Telfer played a key role in helping Airdrieonians gain promotion back to the Scottish Championship via the play-offs at the end of season 2022-23.

=== Ross County ===
Telfer signed for Ross County in July 2024 on a one-year contract.

==== Hamilton Academical (loan) ====
He signed for Hamilton Academical on loan in February 2025 for the remainder of the 2024-25 season.

== International career ==
Telfer has represented Scotland at under-17, under-19 and under-21 level.

== Career statistics ==
As of match played 19 April 2025

Appearances and goals by club, season and competition
| Club | Season | League | | | National cup (Note: Includes Scottish Cup, KNVB Cup) | | League cup (Note: Includes Scottish League Cup) | | Other | | Total | |
| Club | Season | Division | Apps | Goals | Apps | Goals | Apps | Goals | Apps | Goals | Apps | Goals |
|---|---|---|---|---|---|---|---|---|---|---|---|---|
| Rangers | 2013–14 | Scottish League One | 1 | 0 | 0 | 0 | 0 | 0 | 0 | 0 | 1 | 0 |
| Dundee United | 2014–15 | Scottish Premiership | 21 | 4 | 3 | 0 | 1 | 0 | 0 | 0 | 25 | 4 |
| Dundee United | 2015–16 | Scottish Premiership | 7 | 0 | 0 | 0 | 1 | 0 | 0 | 0 | 8 | 0 |
| Dundee United | 2016–17 | Scottish Championship | 25 | 0 | 1 | 0 | 3 | 0 | 9 (Note: Four appearances and two goals in the Scottish Challenge Cup and five appearances in the Scottish Premiership play-offs) | 2 | 38 | 2 |
| Dundee United | Total | | 53 | 4 | 4 | 0 | 5 | 0 | 9 | 2 | 71 | 6 |
| Livingston (loan) | 2015–16 | Scottish Championship | 13 | 0 | 0 | 0 | 0 | 0 | 2 (Note: Appearances in the Scottish Championship play-offs) | 0 | 15 | 0 |
| Almere City | 2017–18 | Eerste Divisie | 8 | 0 | 1 | 0 | — | | 0 | 0 | 9 | 0 |
| Greenock Morton | 2018–19 | Scottish Championship | 29 | 5 | 2 | 0 | 3 | 0 | 0 | 0 | 34 | 5 |
| Falkirk | 2019–20 | Scottish League One | 20 | 4 | 3 | 0 | 4 | 0 | 2 (Note: Appearances in the Scottish Challenge Cup) | 0 | 29 | 4 |
| Falkirk | 2020–21 | Scottish League One | 13 | 4 | 2 | 1 | 2 | 0 | — | | 17 | 5 |
| Falkirk | 2021–22 | Scottish League One | 36 | 5 | 1 | 0 | 2 | 1 | 2 | 0 | 41 | 6 |
| Falkirk | Total | | 69 | 13 | 6 | 1 | 8 | 1 | 4 | 0 | 87 | 15 |
| Airdrieonians | 2022–23 | Scottish League One | 30 | 3 | 1 | 0 | 0 | 0 | 5 (Note: One appearance in the Scottish Challenge Cup and four appearances in the Scottish League One play-offs) | 0 | 36 | 3 |
| Airdrieonians | 2023–24 | Scottish Championship | 30 | 2 | 3 | 0 | 5 | 1 | 6 (Note: Four appearances in the Scottish Challenge Cup and two appearances in the Scottish League One play-offs) | 0 | 44 | 3 |
| Airdrieonians | Total | | 60 | 5 | 4 | 0 | 5 | 1 | 11 | 0 | 80 | 6 |
| Ross County | 2024–25 | Scottish Premiership | 7 | 0 | 1 (Note: Telfer came on in the 105th minute of the 4th Round of the Scottish Cup against Livingston on 18 January 2025. It was not recorded by Soccerbase.) | 0 | 4 | 0 | — | | 12 | 0 |
| Hamilton Academical (loan) | 2024–25 | Scottish Championship | 8 | 0 | — | | — | | — | | 8 | 0 |
| Career total | | | 248 | 32 | 18 | 1 | 25 | 2 | 26 | 2 | 317 | 37 |

== Honours ==
=== Club ===
Rangers

- Scottish Youth Cup: 2013-14

Dundee United

- Scottish Challenge Cup: 2016-17

=== Individual ===
- SPFL Young Player of the Month: November 2014
