= Ryan McGeever =

Scottish footballer

Personal information
- Date of birth: 30 April 1994 (age 32)
- Place of birth: Glasgow, Scotland
- Position: Defender

Youth career
- –2012: Queen's Park

Senior career*
Years	Team	Apps	(Gls)
2012–2015	Falkirk	7	(0)
2013	→ Peterhead (loan)	8	(2)
2014	→ Arbroath (loan)	5	(0)
2015	→ Arbroath (loan)	10	(0)
2015–2017	Queen's Park	62	(8)
2017–2019	Brechin City	25	(1)
2019–2023	Dumbarton	61	(7)
2023	→ Clyde (loan)	7	(0)
2023–	Broomhill	2	(0)
2023–2025	Irish		
- * Club domestic league appearances and goals as of 10:32, 21 November 2023 (UTC)

Ryan McGeever (born 30 April 1994) is a Scottish footballer who plays as a Defender. McGeever began his career with Queen's Park, and signed for Falkirk in the summer of 2012 also spending time with Brechin City and Dumbarton, where he was club captain. During his time at Falkirk, he had loan spells at Peterhead, Arbroath (twice) and whilst at Dumbarton he spent time on loan at Clyde.

== Club career ==
=== Falkirk ===
McGeever joined Falkirk in the summer of 2012, making his first team début in the Scottish Football League First Division against Dumbarton on 20 October 2012. On his second start for the club, McGeever earned the ire of Partick Thistle boss Jackie McNamara for a "shocking" challenge on Thistle]]'s Stuart Bannigan.

In January 2013, McGeever signed a new three-and-a-half-year contract with Falkirk, tying him to the club until 2016.

=== Peterhead (loan) ===
McGeever joined Scottish League Two side Peterhead on a season-long loan on 22 August 2013. His Peterhead debut came two days later, in the 2–2 draw against Elgin City. McGeever made nine appearances in all competitions for the club.

=== Arbroath (loans) ===
On 31 March 2014, McGeever signed for Scottish League One club Arbroath on loan until the end of the 2013–14 season.

On 8 January 2015, McGeever returned to Arbroath for a second loan spell.

=== Queen's Park ===
On 7 August 2015, McGeever signed for Queen's Park, returning to the club three years after first leaving.

=== Brechin City ===
After impressing in his performances for Queen's Park during the 2016–17 season, McGeever subsequently signed for recently promoted Scottish Championship club Brechin City on 12 June 2017.

=== Dumbarton ===
McGeever joined Scottish League One side Dumbarton in July 2019 where he became an ever-present for the Sons, scoring five times in 33 games. He extended his deal with the club until the summer of 2021 in July 2020. After another impressive season at the Rock, he turned down offers from elsewhere to sign a new two-year deal with the Sons in May 2021 – despite the club not having a manager in place at the time. He was named the Sons' captain in June 2022 - replacing Stuart Carswell in the role. He left the club in the summer of 2023 to pursue a teaching career in Dubai after a short spell with Broomhill.

=== Clyde (loan) ===
After struggling for game-time as he recovered from a long-term injury, McGeever moved to Scottish League One side Clyde on loan in February 2023 - with Peter Grant going in the opposite direction.

== Career statistics ==
As of 10:32, 14 April 2023 (UTC)

Appearances and goals by club, season and competition
Club	Season	League			Scottish Cup		League Cup		Other		Total	
Club	Season	Division	Apps	Goals	Apps	Goals	Apps	Goals	Apps	Goals	Apps	Goals
Falkirk	2012–13	Scottish First Division	7	0	1	0	0	0	0	0	8	0
Falkirk	2013–14	Scottish Championship	0	0	0	0	0	0	0	0	0	0
Falkirk	2014–15	Scottish Championship	0	0	0	0	0	0	0	0	0	0
Falkirk	2015–16	Scottish Championship	0	0	0	0	0	0	0	0	0	0
Falkirk	Total		7	0	1	0	0	0	0	0	8	0
Peterhead (loan)	2013–14	Scottish League Two	8	2	1	0	0	0	0	0	9	2
Arbroath (loan)	2013–14	Scottish League One	5	0	0	0	0	0	0	0	5	0
Arbroath (loan)	2014–15	Scottish League One	10	0	0	0	0	0	0	0	10	0
Arbroath (loan)	Total		15	0	0	0	0	0	0	0	15	0
Queen's Park	2015–16	Scottish League Two	28	4	3	0	0	0	6 (Note: Two appearances in the Scottish Challenge Cup and four in the League One play-offs)	0	37	4
Queen's Park	2016–17	Scottish League One	34	4	3	0	4	0	3 (Note: Appearances in the Scottish Challenge Cup)	1	44	5
Queen's Park	Total		62	8	6	0	4	0	9	1	81	9
Brechin City	2017–18	Scottish Championship	5	0	0	0	2	0	1	0	8	0
Brechin City	2018–19	Scottish League One	20	1	1	0	0	0	0	0	21	1
Brechin City	Total		25	1	1	0	2	0	1	0	29	1
Dumbarton	2019–20	Scottish League One	26	4	2	1	4	0	1	0	33	5
Dumbarton	2020–21	Scottish League One	18	1	2	1	4	0	2	1	26	3
Dumbarton	2021–22	Scottish League One	10	2	0	0	3	0	1	0	14	2
Dumbarton	2022–23	Scottish League Two	6	0	1	0	0	0	1	0	8	0
Clyde (loan)	2022–23	Scottish League One	7	0	0	0	0	0	0	0	7	0
Career total			184	18	14	2	17	0	15	2	230	22
