= Kyle Hutton =

Scottish footballer (born 1991)

Personal information
- Date of birth: 5 February 1991 (age 35)
- Place of birth: Cambuslang, Scotland
- Height: 1.89 m (6 ft 2 in)
- Position: Midfielder

Team information
- Current team: Gartcairn

Senior career*
Years	Team	Apps	(Gls)
2010–2015	Rangers	54	(2)
2011	→ Partick Thistle (loan)	12	(0)
2012	→ Dunfermline Athletic (loan)	9	(0)
2015–2016	Queen of the South	30	(0)
2016–2017	St Mirren	11	(0)
2016–2017	→ Airdrieonians (loan)	20	(0)
2017–2020	Dumbarton	87	(0)
2020–2021	East Kilbride		
2021	→ Cowdenbeath (loan)	12	(0)
2021–2022	Cowdenbeath	12	(0)
2022–2023	Forfar Athletic	43	(1)
2023–2024	Pollok	8	(0)
2024	→ Darvel (loan)		
2024–	Gartcairn		

International career^{‡}
2009–2010	Scotland U19	7	(0)
2010	Scotland U21	1	(0)
- * Club domestic league appearances and goals as of 14:45, 7 November 2024 (UTC) ‡ National team caps and goals as of 30 October 2011

Kyle Hutton (born 5 February 1991) is a Scottish professional footballer who plays as a midfielder for West of Scotland League First Division club Gartcairn.

He has previously played for Rangers, Partick Thistle, Dunfermline Athletic and Queen of the South, St Mirren, Airdrieonians, Dumbarton, Cowdenbeath and Forfar Athletic.

== Career ==
=== Rangers ===
Hutton made his professional debut for Rangers in the opening Scottish Premier League match of the season against Kilmarnock on 14 August 2010, coming on for James Beattie. He made his first start against Dunfermline Athletic on 21 September 2010. He picked up his first senior honour after coming on as an 82nd-minute substitute for Rangers in a 2–1 extra-time victory over Celtic in the 2011 Scottish League Cup final. A fortnight before, Hutton had signed a new contract with Rangers, keeping him there until 2014.

In October 2012, after returning from loan spells with Partick Thistle and Dunfermline Athletic, Hutton hoped his performances could see him feature more regularly for the first team. Ahead of the 2012–13 season Hutton agreed to transfer to Charles Green's new holding company saying, "For me, it is in my best interests to stay where I am and to try to establish myself in the side next season. I feel I've got a lot more to give the club." After starting in Rangers' first league game of the season against Brechin City in late July, Hutton wouldn't feature again till late September, coming on as a substitute in the League Cup against Motherwell for the injured Francisco Sandaza. His performance earned many plaudits, with Hutton saying afterwards he was 'in the dark' over why he hadn't featured more. In November 2013, Hutton suffered a broken leg, ruling him out of action on a long-term basis.

At the end of the 2014–15 season, Hutton was one of eleven players released by Rangers.

==== Partick Thistle (loan) ====
With first team chances limited at Rangers, Hutton agreed to move to Sheffield United on a season long loan at the end of the summer transfer window in 2012, but the deal subsequently fell through as the paperwork was not completed before the deadline. However, Hutton was eligible to leave on loan after the transfer window shut to a team in Scotland outwith the SPL and subsequently joined Partick Thistle on a three-month loan deal on 9 September 2011.

==== Dunfermline (loan) ====
On the last day of the January 2012 transfer window, Hutton joined Dunfermline Athletic on loan until the end of the season. During his time on loan there was much speculation about Rangers possibly being forced to sell players with Hutton saying, "If Rangers need to sell players then it might give younger lads like myself an opportunity because there are definitely kids there who can do a job." Hutton went on to play nine games for Dunfermline Athletic but couldn't help save them from relegation.

=== Queen of the South ===
On 13 August 2015, Hutton joined Queen of the South, signing a contract until January 2016. Hutton debuted for the Doonhamers on 30 August 2015, appearing as a second-half substitute in a 5–1 defeat at home to his former club Rangers. On 8 January 2016, Hutton signed an extension to his current contract, taking him through to the end of the season.

=== St Mirren ===
On 10 May 2016, Hutton signed a two-year contract with St Mirren, after leaving Queen of the South. After just one year, Hutton's contract was terminated by St Mirren on 23 May 2017.

==== Airdrieonians (loan) ====
On 29 November 2016, Hutton moved to Scottish League One side Airdrieonians on an emergency loan deal. On 20 January 2017, the loan was extended until the end of the season.

=== Dumbarton ===
Hutton subsequently signed a six-month deal with Dumbarton on 21 July 2017. He extended his deal until the end of the season on 26 January 2018. After playing 47 times as the Sons were relegated to Scottish League One, Hutton had interest from Inverness Caledonian Thistle to stay with the club in May 2018. He was a virtual ever-present the following season too, playing more minutes than any other player and captaining the side on a number of occasions. Hutton signed a fresh one-year deal with the club, taking him into his third season at Dumbarton, in June 2019. He was named the club's 2019–20 Player of the Year in May 2020 but left two months later at the end of his contract.

=== East Kilbride and Cowdenbeath ===
After leaving the Sons, Hutton dropped to the Lowland Football League to sign for East Kilbride along with Dumbarton teammate Conor Brennan. Following the suspension of the 2021–22 Lowland Football League season due to the COVID-19 pandemic Hutton joined Scottish League Two side Cowdenbeath on loan in March 2021. He joined the club permanently that summer – before having his contract cancelled in January 2022.

=== Forfar Athletic ===
Hutton joined Forfar Athletic in February 2022, where he was signed by former teammate at St Mirren Gary Irvine.

==== Pollok ====
In May 2023, it was confirmed that Hutton had signed for West of Scotland Premier side Pollok. He was transfer listed in October and spent the rest of the season on loan at Darvel.

==== Darvel ====
In November 2023, Hutton signed for Darvel F.C. on loan for the remainder of the 2023/24 season.

==== Gartcairn ====
In June 2024, Hutton signed for Gartcairn and was immediately named vice-captain.

== Career statistics ==
As of 23:53, 7 March 2020 (UTC)

Appearances and goals by club, season and competition
Club	Season	League			Scottish Cup		League Cup		Other		Total	
Club	Season	Division	Apps	Goals	Apps	Goals	Apps	Goals	Apps	Goals	Apps	Goals
Rangers	2010–11	Premier League	7	0	1	0	3	0	3 (Note: Two appearances in the Champions League and one in the Europa League)	0	14	0
Rangers	2011–12	Premier League	0	0	0	0	0	0	0	0	0	0
Rangers	2012–13	Third Division	27	2	2	0	3	0	1 (Note: Appearances in the Scottish Challenge Cup)	0	33	2
Rangers	2013–14	League One	10	0	2	0	0	0	1	0	13	0
Rangers	2014–15	Championship	10	0	1	0	1	0	0	0	12	0
Rangers	Total		54	2	6	0	7	0	5	0	72	2
Partick Thistle (loan)	2011–12	First Division	12	0	0	0	0	0	0	0	12	0
Dunfermline Athletic (loan)	2011–12	Premier League	9	0	0	0	0	0	0	0	9	0
Queen of the South	2015–16	Championship	30	0	1	0	1	0	1	0	33	0
St Mirren	2016–17	Championship	11	0	0	0	4	0	2	0	17	0
Airdrieonians (loan)	2016–17	League One	20	0	0	0	0	0	2 (Note: Appearances in the League One play-offs)	0	22	0
Dumbarton	2017–18	Championship	31	0	3	0	3	0	10	0	47	0
Dumbarton	2018–19	League One	35	0	1	0	4	0	1	0	41	0
Dumbarton	2019–20	League One	21	0	2	0	4	0	1	0	28	0
Dumbarton	Total		87	0	6	0	11	0	12	0	116	0
Career total			223	2	13	0	23	0	22	0	280	2

== Personal life ==
On 20 September 2010, Hutton and fellow Rangers youth player Kal Naismith were abducted by two men in Edinburgh and driven around the city before being dumped in the city's Niddrie area. The men then mugged the players and stole the car. The car was later recovered and the men were both convicted.

In November 2024, Hutton was arrested and charged with road traffic offences following the death of a woman who was hit by a pick-up truck in Rutherglen.

== Honours ==
Rangers

- Scottish Premier League: 2010–11
- Scottish League One: 2013–14
- Scottish Third Division: 2012–13
- Scottish League Cup: 2010–11

Dumbarton

- Scottish Challenge Cup: Runners Up 2017–18

Darvel

- West of Scotland Football League Cup: 2023-24
- Scottish Junior Cup: 2023-24
