= Patrick Langan =

American statistician and criminologist

Patrick A. Langan is an American statistician and criminologist who was formerly the senior statistician at the Bureau of Justice Statistics.

He has also served as a research statistician at the Maryland Department of Juvenile Services, and as a research analyst at the National Institute of Justice. He received his Ph.D. from the University of Maryland in criminology. He has studied various issues related to crime, including felony conviction rates in the United States, finding them to be highest in the South.
