= Daniel Langan =

Irish rugby union player

- Full name: Daniel Joseph Langan
- Born: 19 March 1910 Dublin, Ireland
- Died: 9 October 1985 (aged 75)

Rugby union career
- Position: Fullback
International career
Years	Team	Apps	(Points)
1934	Ireland	1	(0)

Daniel Joseph Langan (19 March 1910 — 9 October 1985) was an Irish international rugby union player.

Born in Dublin, Langan represented Munster and gained his solitary Ireland cap in the 1934 Home Nations, displacing Robin Pratt at fullback for the match against Wales in Swansea, towards the end of which he broke his collarbone.

Langan won his Ireland cap while with Clontarf and later played for Garryowen.

An oil executive, Langan was the father of restaurateur Peter Langan, founder of Langan's Brasserie.

== See also ==
- List of Ireland national rugby union players
