= Stuart Carswell =

Scottish footballer

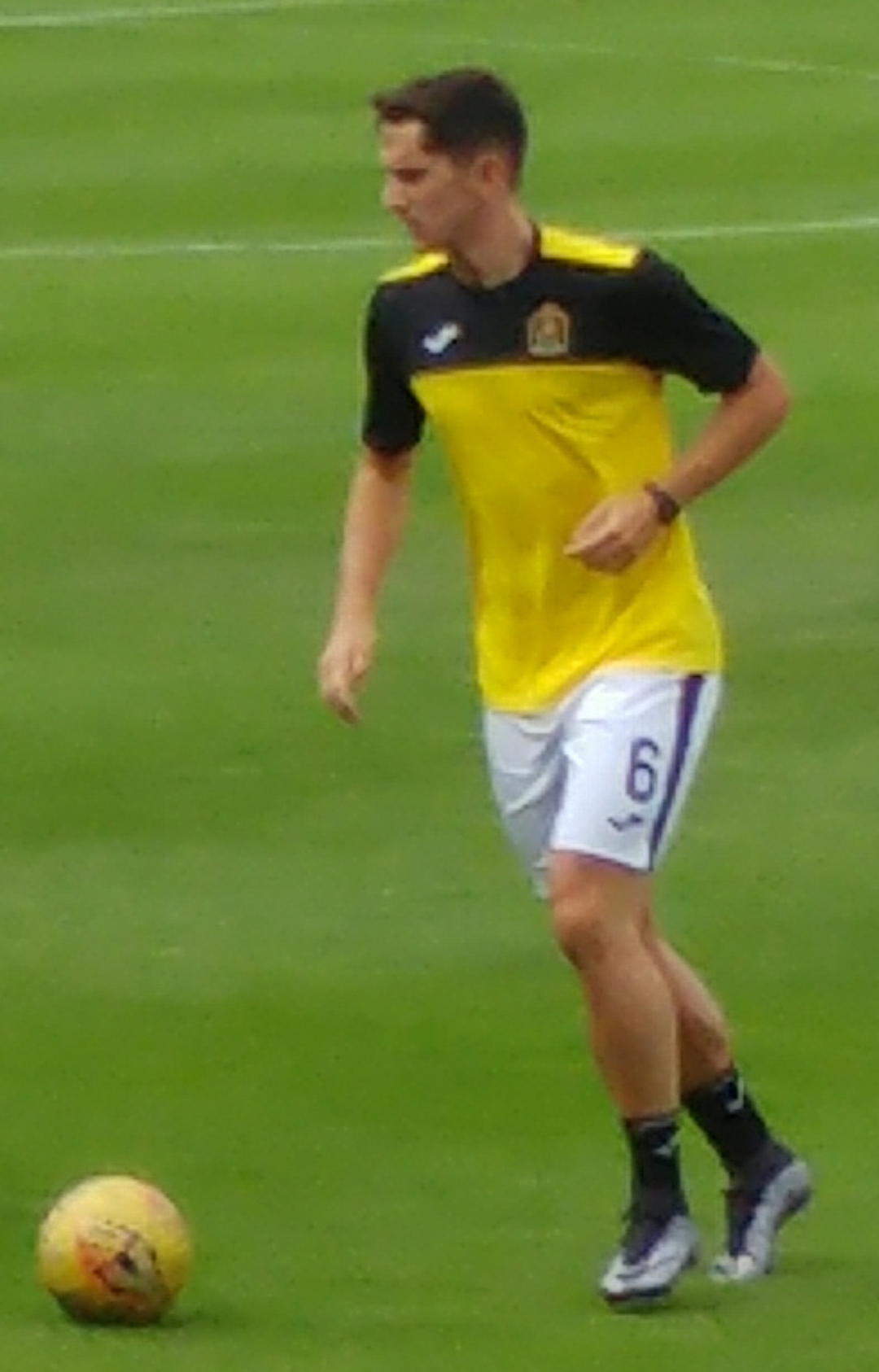

Personal information
- Date of birth: 9 September 1993 (age 33)
- Place of birth: Bellshill, Scotland
- Height: 6 ft 0 in (1.83 m)
- Position: Midfielder

Team information
- Current team: Thorniewood United

Youth career
- 2009–2011: Motherwell

Senior career*
Years	Team	Apps	(Gls)
2011–2015	Motherwell	86	(0)
2015–2016	St Mirren	20	(0)
2016	Keflavík	12	(0)
2017–2023	Dumbarton	174	(13)
2023–2024	Clyde	13	(0)
2024–	Thorniewood United		
- * Club domestic league appearances and goals as of 14:52, 24 August 2024 (UTC)

Stuart Carswell (born 9 September 1993) is a Scottish professional footballer who plays as a midfielder for West of Scotland Football League side Thorniewood United. Carswell has previously played for Motherwell, St Mirren, Dumbarton and Clyde, as well as Icelandic side Keflavík.

== Career ==
=== Motherwell ===
Born in Bellshill, and a product of the Fir Park club's youth system, Carswell starred in the Motherwell under-19 side that finished second behind Celtic in the 2009–10 Scottish Premier League under-19 season. Carswell made his first team debut in the 0–0 draw against Hearts on 9 April 2011, playing the full 90 minutes.

On 3 February 2012, Carswell signed a new contract, keeping him at Motherwell until 2014. That was extended by a further year on 21 March 2013. On 2 June 2015, Motherwell announced that Carswell was amongst the players leaving the club, with his contract having expired.

=== St Mirren ===
Carswell signed a two-year contract with St Mirren on 29 June 2015. He decided to leave St Mirren at the end of the 2015–16 season having made 24 appearances for the club.

=== Keflavík ===
After leaving St Mirren, Carswell signed for Icelandic side Keflavík in July 2016, making his debut in a goalless draw with Leiknir R. Carswell left Keflavík at the end of the 2016 season wanting to progress his career back home.

=== Dumbarton ===
Carswell joined Scottish Championship side Dumbarton on 5 January 2017. After playing in every game following his arrival at 'The Rock' he signed a new deal in May 2017. He scored his first goal in senior football for the club, in his 151st game, with a free-kick winner in a Scottish Cup tie against Elgin City, his next goal also came in a 1-0 success, as he rifled in a 'magnificent' 25 yard strike against Alloa Athletic in the Scottish Championship playoff final. Despite the club's relegation to Scottish League One Carswell signed a new one-year deal in June 2018. He scored his first goal in league football, the third in a 4–0 victory against East Fife, in October 2018. After impressing in both central midfield and central defence, Carswell was named Dumbarton's Player of the Year for the 2018–19 season. He renewed his deal with the club in June 2019 where he was appointed club captain. He made his 100th appearance for the club in August 2019. He extended his deal for a fifth season with the club in July 2020. Carswell extended his time at the Rock by another two seasons in June 2021. He finished the 2021–22 season with seven goals to his name - a career best, as the Sons were relegated to Scottish League Two. He was replaced as the club's captain in June 2022 by Ryan McGeever. Carswell scored the winning goal on his 200th appearance for the Sons, against Bonnyrigg Rose Athletic in September 2022. Carswell was released by the Sons in May 2023 after six-and-a-half seasons and 224 appearances for the club.

=== Later career ===
Carswell joined Clyde in June 2023 but left the club after just 17 appearances in January 2024 and joined West of Scotland Football League side Thorniewood United along with former Motherwell, Dumbarton and Clyde teammate Ross Forbes.

== Career statistics ==
As of 09:03, 21 November 2023 (UTC)

Club	Season	League		National Cup		League Cup		Other		Total	
Club	Season	Apps	Goals	Apps	Goals	Apps	Goals	Apps	Goals	Apps	Goals
Motherwell	2010–11	4	0	0	0	0	0	0	0	4	0
Motherwell	2011–12	14	0	1	0	1	0	0	0	16	0
Motherwell	2012–13	23	0	1	0	0	0	2	0	26	0
Motherwell	2013–14	28	0	1	0	2	0	1	0	32	0
Motherwell	2014–15	19	0	0	0	0	0	2	0	21	0
Motherwell	Total	88	0	3	0	3	0	5	0	99	0
St Mirren	2015–16	20	0	1	0	1	0	2	0	24	0
Keflavík	2016	12	0	0	0	0	0	0	0	12	0
Dumbarton	2016–17	16	0	0	0	0	0	0	0	17	0
Dumbarton	2017–18	26	0	3	1	0	0	9	1	38	2
Dumbarton	2018–19	31	2	1	0	4	0	2	0	38	2
Dumbarton	2019–20	25	1	1	0	4	0	1	0	31	1
Dumbarton	2020–21	18	0	2	0	2	0	4	0	26	0
Dumbarton	2021–22	31	7	2	0	3	0	3	0	39	7
Dumbarton	2022–23	27	3	3	1	4	0	2	0	36	4
Dumbarton	Total	174	13	12	2	17	0	21	1	224	16
Clyde	2023–24	13	0	3	0	0	0	1	0	17	0
Total		305	13	19	2	22	0	29	1	378	16
