= 2020–21 Scottish League One =

Scottish League One
- Season: 2020–21
- Dates: 17 October 2020 – 6 May 2021
- Champions: Partick Thistle
- Promoted: Partick Thistle
- Relegated: Forfar Athletic
- Matches: 110
- Goals: 278 (2.53 per match)
- Top goalscorer: Mitch Megginson (14 goals)

The 2020–21 Scottish League One was the eighth season of Scottish League One, the third tier of Scottish football. The season commenced later than usual, on the October 17th, being played over a shortened 22 game period due to the ongoing coronavirus pandemic.

Ten teams contested the league: Airdrieonians, Clyde, Cove Rangers, Dumbarton, East Fife, Falkirk, Forfar Athletic, Montrose, Partick Thistle and Peterhead.

On 11 January 2021, the league was suspended for three weeks due to the COVID-19 pandemic. On 29 January 2021, the suspension was extended until at least 14 February. In March 2021, the Scottish Government gave permission for the league to resume. On 4 March, League One and Two clubs proposed shortening the season to 22 matches, with each team playing all other teams twice, followed by a split in the table to determine the final four matches. The clubs suggested a restart date of 20 March, which was approved by the SPFL.

== Teams ==
The following teams changed division after the 2019–20 season.

=== To League One ===
Promoted from League Two

- Cove Rangers

Relegated from the Championship

- Partick Thistle

=== From League One ===
Relegated to League Two

- Stranraer

Promoted to the Championship

- Raith Rovers

=== Stadia and locations ===
Airdrieonians	Clyde	Cove Rangers	Dumbarton
Excelsior Stadium	Broadwood Stadium	Balmoral Stadium	Dumbarton Football Stadium
Capacity: 10,101	Capacity: 8,086	Capacity: 2,602	Capacity: 2,020
East Fife	Location of teams in 2020–21 Scottish League One		Falkirk
Bayview Stadium	Location of teams in 2020–21 Scottish League One		Falkirk Stadium
Capacity: 1,980	Location of teams in 2020–21 Scottish League One		Capacity: 7,937
Forfar Athletic	Montrose	Partick Thistle	Peterhead
Station Park	Links Park	Firhill Stadium	Balmoor
Capacity: 6,777	Capacity: 4,936	Capacity: 10,102	Capacity: 3,150

=== Personnel and kits ===
Team	Manager	Captain	Kit manufacturer	Shirt sponsor
Airdrieonians	(Scotland) Ian Murray	(Scotland) Sean Crighton	Umbro	Holemasters
Clyde	(Scotland) Danny Lennon	(Scotland) David Goodwillie	Uhlsport	North Lanarkshire Leisure (Home); HomesBook Factoring (Away)
Cove Rangers	(Scotland) Paul Hartley	(Scotland) Mitch Megginson	Adidas	ACE Group
Dumbarton	(Scotland) Jim Duffy	(Scotland) Stuart Carswell	Joma	C&G Systems
East Fife	(Scotland) Darren Young	(Scotland) Kevin Smith	Joma	BW Technology
Falkirk	(Scotland) Gary Holt (Interim)	(Scotland) Gary Miller	Puma	Central Demolition
Forfar Athletic	(Scotland) Gary Irvine	(Scotland) Gary Irvine	Pendle	Orchard Timber Products
Montrose	(Scotland) Stewart Petrie	(Scotland) Paul Watson	Hummel	Carnegie Fuels Ltd
Partick Thistle	(Scotland) Ian McCall	(Scotland) Thomas O'Ware	O'Neills	Just Employment Law
Peterhead	(Scotland) Jim McInally	(Scotland) Scott Brown	Adidas	The Score Group

=== Managerial changes ===
Team	Outgoing manager	Manner of departure	Date of vacancy	Position in table	Incoming manager	Date of appointment
Forfar Athletic	(Scotland) Stuart Malcolm	Resigned	9 April 2021	10th	(Scotland) Gary Irvine	9 April 2021
Falkirk	(Scotland) David McCracken (Scotland) Lee Miller	Sacked	21 April 2021	3rd	(Scotland) Gary Holt (interim)	21 April 2021

== League summary ==
=== League table ===
Pos	Team	Pld	W	D	L	GF	GA	GD	Pts	Promotion, qualification or relegation
1	Partick Thistle (C, P)	22	11	7	4	40	18	+22	40	Promotion to the Championship
2	Airdrieonians	22	12	2	8	35	24	+11	38	Qualification for the Championship play-offs
3	Cove Rangers	22	10	6	6	28	18	+10	36	Qualification for the Championship play-offs
4	Montrose	22	9	6	7	33	33	0	33	Qualification for the Championship play-offs
5	Falkirk	22	9	5	8	29	26	+3	32	
6	East Fife	22	10	3	9	30	33	−3	33	
7	Peterhead	22	9	2	11	24	27	−3	29	
8	Clyde	22	8	2	12	27	38	−11	26	
9	Dumbarton (O)	22	7	4	11	14	24	−10	25	Qualification for the League One play-offs
10	Forfar Athletic (R)	22	4	5	13	18	37	−19	17	Relegation to League Two

Source: SPFL
Rules for classification: 1) Points; 2) Goal difference; 3) Goals scored; 4) Head-to-to head points; 5) Head-to-head goal difference; 6) Play-off (only for deciding promotion, play-off participation and relegation).
(C) Champions; (O) Play-off winners; (P) Promoted; (R) Relegated

== Results ==
Teams play each other two times, making a total of 90 games, with each team playing 18, the league then splits in half for a further 4 matches. This was reduced from the normal 36 due to the coronavirus pandemic.

=== Matches 1–18 ===
Home \ Away	AIR	CLY	COV	DUM	EFI	FAL	FOR	MON	PAR	PET
Airdrieonians	—	5–0	1–1	0–2	2–0	2–1	3–1	0–1	2–4	2–0
Clyde	2–4	—	1–1	0–1	1–3	0–3	3–0	3–2	1–0	0–2
Cove Rangers	2–0	2–3	—	1–0	3–1	2–0	3–0	1–2	1–0	1–0
Dumbarton	0–1	1–0	1–0	—	2–1	0–3	0–1	0–0	0–2	0–1
East Fife	2–0	1–0	0–0	2–1	—	2–1	2–0	2–2	2–2	2–1
Falkirk	0–1	2–1	1–0	1–1	2–0	—	1–1	2–0	0–0	2–1
Forfar Athletic	1–3	1–3	0–1	0–0	1–2	0–2	—	2–3	0–2	1–1
Montrose	2–2	2–2	1–0	4–0	3–0	1–3	0–0	—	0–1	3–2
Partick Thistle	2–1	2–0	1–1	0–0	2–0	2–2	2–2	5–0	—	0–1
Peterhead	1–0	0–2	0–2	1–0	2–1	1–0	0–1	1–1	0–3	—

Source: SPFL
Legend: Blue = home team win; Yellow = draw; Red = away team win.
For upcoming matches, an "a" indicates there is an article about the rivalry between the two participants.

=== Post-Split Fixtures (Matches 19–22) ===
==== Top half ====
Home \ Away	AIR	COV	FAL	MON	PAR
Airdrieonians	—	—	2–0	2–1	—
Cove Rangers	0–2	—	—	—	2–2
Falkirk	—	2–2	—	1–2	—
Montrose	—	0–2	—	—	3–2
Partick Thistle	1–0	—	5–0	—	—

Source: SPFL
Legend: Blue = home team win; Yellow = draw; Red = away team win.
For upcoming matches, an "a" indicates there is an article about the rivalry between the two participants.

==== Bottom half ====
Home \ Away	CLY	DUM	EFI	FOR	PET
Clyde	—	2–0	2–1	—	—
Dumbarton	—	—	—	1–0	3–2
East Fife	—	2–1	—	—	1–3
Forfar Athletic	2–1	—	2–3	—	—
Peterhead	3–0	—	—	1–2	—

Source: SPFL
Legend: Blue = home team win; Yellow = draw; Red = away team win.
For upcoming matches, an "a" indicates there is an article about the rivalry between the two participants.

== Season statistics ==
=== Scoring ===
==== Top scorers ====
As of 6 May 2021

Rank	Player	Club	Goals
1	(Scotland) Mitch Megginson	Cove Rangers	14
2	(Scotland) David Goodwillie	Clyde	11
2	(Scotland) Brian Graham	Partick Thistle	11
4	(Scotland) Dale Carrick	Airdrieonians	9
5	(Scotland) Graham Webster	Montrose	8
6	(Scotland) Jack Hamilton	East Fife	7
6	(Scotland) Russell McLean	Montrose	7
6	(Scotland) Scott Tiffoney	Partick Thistle	7

==== Hat-tricks ====
Player	For	Against	Score	Date
(Scotland) David Goodwillie	Clyde	Montrose	3–2 (H)	21 November 2020

=== Attendances ===
Games were mostly played behind closed doors due to the COVID-19 pandemic. Limited attendance was allowed at some grounds with strict conditions under the Scottish Government Tier system, dependent on the club's geographical location.

== Awards ==
Month	Manager of the Month		Player of the Month	
Month	Manager	Club	Player	Club
October	(Scotland) Paul Hartley	Cove Rangers	(Scotland) Stuart McKenzie	Cove Rangers
November	(Scotland) David McCracken (Scotland) Lee Miller	Falkirk	(France) Thomas Robert	Airdrieonians
December	(Scotland) Stewart Petrie	Montrose	(Scotland) Jack Hamilton	East Fife
January	N/A	N/A	N/A	N/A
February	N/A	N/A	N/A	N/A
March	(Scotland) David McCracken (Scotland) Lee Miller	Falkirk	(Scotland) Graham Webster	Montrose
April	(Scotland) Ian McCall	Partick Thistle	(Scotland) Scott Tiffoney	Partick Thistle

== League One play-offs ==
The second bottom team, Dumbarton, entered into a 4-team playoff with the 2nd-4th placed teams in 2020–21 Scottish League Two. Edinburgh City along with Elgin City and Stranraer secured playoff spots.

=== Semi-final ===
==== First leg ====
8 May 2021	Stranraer	0–0	Dumbarton	Stranraer
15:00		Report		Stadium: Stair Park; Referee: Chris Graham

8 May 2021	Elgin City	0–1	Edinburgh City	Elgin
15:00		Report	Campbell 45'	Stadium: Borough Briggs; Referee: Alan Newlands

==== Second leg ====
11 May 2021	Dumbarton	1–0 (1–0 agg.)	Stranraer	Dumbarton
19:45	Wilson 36'	Report		Stadium: Dumbarton Football Stadium; Referee: Gavin Duncan

11 May 2021	Edinburgh City	2–2 (3–2 agg.)	Elgin City	Edinburgh
19:45	Handling 26'; Campbell 88'	Report	McHardy 22', 42'	Stadium: Ainslie Park; Referee: Craig Napier

=== Final ===
==== First leg ====
17 May 2021	Edinburgh City	1–3	Dumbarton	Edinburgh
19:35	McIntyre 44'	Report	McGeever 53'; Brindley 67'; Neill 82'	Stadium: Ainslie Park; Referee: Colin Steven

==== Second leg ====
20 May 2021	Dumbarton	0–1 (3–2 agg.)	Edinburgh City	Dumbarton
19:35		Report	See 52'	Stadium: Dumbarton Football Stadium; Referee: Alan Newlands
