= PJ Crossan =

Scottish footballer (born 1998)

Personal information
- Full name: Paul Joseph Crossan
- Date of birth: 9 October 1998 (age 28)
- Place of birth: Motherwell, Scotland
- Height: 1.71 m (5 ft 7 in)
- Position: Forward

Youth career
- Yett Farm Boys Club
- –2014: Fife Elite Football Academy
- 2014–2016: Dunfermline Athletic
- 2016–2019: Celtic

Senior career*
| Years | Team | Apps | (Gls) |
| 2016 | Dunfermline Athletic | 2 | (0) |
| 2016–2019 | Celtic | 0 | (0) |
| 2017–2018 | → Alloa Athletic (loan) | 28 | (3) |
| 2018–2019 | → Stranraer (loan) | 21 | (2) |
| 2019–2021 | Dumbarton | 39 | (6) |
| 2021–2022 | Forfar Athletic | 29 | (1) |

International career^{‡}
| 2014 | Scotland U17 | 1 | (0) |
- * Club domestic league appearances and goals as of 22:48, 30 June 2022 (UTC) ‡ National team caps and goals as of 12:37, 11 July 2016 (UTC)

Paul Joseph "PJ" Crossan (born 9 October 1998) is a Scottish professional footballer who plays as a forward. Crossan began his career with Dunfermline Athletic, before moving to Celtic in 2016. He also had spells with Alloa Athletic, Stranraer, Dumbarton and Forfar Athletic.

== Career ==
Crossan started his career with Yett Farm Boys Club and Fife Elite Football Academy, before signing with Dunfermline Athletic in 2014. Initially playing in the U20s squad, Crossan eventually progressed to the Pars first-team, making two substitutes in Scottish League One towards the end of the 2015–16 season. His first appearance came as a substitute in a 6–1 defeat of Stranraer, whilst his second came in Dunfermline's League One title winning match against Brechin City, coming on as an 89th minute-substitute and setting up a goal.

He signed for Celtic on 4 July 2016 for an undisclosed transfer fee. In August 2017, and after a year playing with Celtic's development side, Crossan was sent on loan to Scottish League One club Alloa Athletic, until January 2018. The loan was subsequently extended until the end of the season.

Crossan was loaned to Stranraer at the end of September 2018. After spending three years with Celtic, he was released by the club at the end of the 2018–19 season. He signed for Scottish League One club Dumbarton in July 2019 scoring six times in his first season with the club, before extending his stay in July 2020. He left the club after an injury plagued second season, joining Scottish League Two side Forfar Athletic.

== Career statistics ==
As of 22:48, 1 May 2021 (UTC)

Appearances and goals by club, season and competition
| Club | Season | League | | | FA Cup | | League Cup | | Other | | Total | |
| Club | Season | Division | Apps | Goals | Apps | Goals | Apps | Goals | Apps | Goals | Apps | Goals |
|---|---|---|---|---|---|---|---|---|---|---|---|---|
| Dunfermline Athletic | 2015–16 | Scottish League One | 2 | 0 | 0 | 0 | 0 | 0 | 0 | 0 | 2 | 0 |
| Celtic U20/U21 | 2016–17 | SPFL Development League | — | | — | | — | | 3 (Note: Appearances in the Scottish Challenge Cup) | 0 | 3 | 0 |
| Celtic U20/U21 | 2017–18 | SPFL Development League | — | | — | | — | | 1 | 0 | 1 | 0 |
| Celtic U20/U21 | 2018–19 | SPFL Reserve League | — | | — | | — | | 1 | 0 | 1 | 0 |
| Celtic U20/U21 | Celtic U20/U21 total | | — | | — | | — | | 5 | 0 | 5 | 0 |
| Alloa Athletic (loan) | 2017–18 | Scottish League One | 28 | 3 | 1 | 0 | 0 | 0 | 0 | 0 | 29 | 3 |
| Stranraer (loan) | 2018–19 | Scottish League One | 21 | 2 | 2 | 1 | 0 | 0 | 0 | 0 | 23 | 3 |
| Dumbarton | 2019–20 | Scottish League One | 25 | 5 | 2 | 0 | 4 | 1 | 1 | 0 | 32 | 6 |
| Dumbarton | 2020–21 | Scottish League One | 14 | 1 | 2 | 0 | 2 | 0 | 0 | 0 | 18 | 1 |
| Dumbarton | Dumbarton total | | 39 | 6 | 4 | 0 | 6 | 1 | 1 | 0 | 50 | 7 |
| Forfar Athletic | 2021–22 | Scottish League Two | 29 | 1 | 2 | 0 | 3 | 0 | 4 | 0 | 38 | 1 |
| Career total | | | 119 | 12 | 9 | 1 | 9 | 1 | 10 | 0 | 147 | 14 |
