= Conor Brennan =

Northern Irish footballer

Personal information
- Date of birth: 30 March 1994 (age 32)
- Place of birth: Downpatrick, County Down, Northern Ireland
- Height: 1.90 m (6 ft 3 in)
- Position: Goalkeeper

Youth career
- Leicester City

Senior career*
Years	Team	Apps	(Gls)
2014–2016	Kilmarnock	7	(0)
2015	→ Stranraer (loan)	3	(0)
2016–2017	Raith Rovers	8	(0)
2017–2018	Ballymena United	11	(0)
2018	Greenock Morton	5	(0)
2018–2019	Brechin City	17	(0)
2019–2020	Dumbarton	30	(0)
2020–2022	East Kilbride	43	(0)
2022–2023	Stenhousemuir	17	(0)

International career^{‡}
	Northern Ireland U16	12	(0)
	Northern Ireland U17	6	(0)
	Northern Ireland U19	2	(0)
2013–2016	Northern Ireland U21	13	(0)
- * Club domestic league appearances and goals as of 6 May 2023 ‡ National team caps and goals as of 22:28, 4 May 2019 (UTC)

Conor Brennan (born 30 March 1994) is a Northern Irish footballer who plays as a goalkeeper, and is currently the Head of Academy Goalkeeping at Rangers.

Brennan has previously played for Kilmarnock, Stranraer, Raith Rovers, Ballymena United, Greenock Morton, Brechin City, Dumbarton, East Kilbride and Stenhousemuir.

== Career ==
Brennan made his debut for Kilmarnock in a 2–0 victory over Dundee United on 3 October 2014, after replacing injured Killie goalkeeper Craig Samson at half time.

In July 2015, Brennan signed on loan with Scottish League One side Stranraer on a six-month deal. He was recalled by Kilmarnock on 1 September 2015, after the club loaned fellow goalkeeper Devlin McKay to Derby County. On 23 May 2016, he was one of six players released at the end of their contract.

On 27 August 2016, Brennan signed for Scottish Championship club Raith Rovers on a contract until January 2017. He made his debut the same day, as Raith Rovers drew 2–2 away to Dundee United. On 12 January 2017 Brennan signed an extension to his contract keeping him at the club until the end of the season.

After leaving Raith, Brennan signed with the NIFL Premiership side Ballymena United before returning to Scotland to sign with Greenock Morton on 18 January 2018.

During the 2018 close season, Brennan signed for Brechin City. He left the club in January 2019 and signed for Dumbarton. After impressing in his two appearances for the club he signed a new one-year deal in June the same year. He left the club in July 2020 after spending the 2019–20 season as the club's number one and signed for Lowland Football League side East Kilbride.

== Career statistics ==
As of 23:53, 7 March 2020 (UTC)

Club statistics
Club	Season	League			Scottish Cup		League Cup		Other		Total	
Club	Season	Division	Apps	Goals	Apps	Goals	Apps	Goals	Apps	Goals	Apps	Goals
Kilmarnock	2014–15	Scottish Premiership	4	0	0	0	0	0	0	0	4	0
Kilmarnock	2015–16	Scottish Premiership	3	0	0	0	0	0	0	0	3	0
Kilmarnock	Total		7	0	0	0	0	0	0	0	7	0
Stranraer (loan)	2015–16	Scottish League One	3	0	0	0	2	0	1	0	6	0
Raith Rovers	2016–17	Scottish Championship	8	0	0	0	0	0	3	0	11	0
Ballymena United	2017–18	NIFL Premiership	11	0	0	0	0	0	0	0	11	0
Greenock Morton	2017–18	Scottish Championship	5	0	0	0	0	0	0	0	5	0
Brechin City	2018–19	Scottish League One	17	0	1	0	4	0	0	0	22	0
Dumbarton	2018–19	Scottish League One	2	0	0	0	0	0	0	0	2	0
Dumbarton	2019–20	Scottish League One	28	0	2	0	2	0	0	0	32	0
Dumbarton	Total		30	0	2	0	2	0	0	0	34	0
Career total			81	0	2	0	4	0	4	0	96	0
