= Isaac Layne =

English footballer (born 1995)

Carlos Lyon
Personal information
- Date of birth: 16 May 1995 (age 31)
- Place of birth: London, England
- Height: 5 ft 9 in (1.75 m)
- Position: Forward

Team information
- Current team: Cheshunt

Youth career
- –2013: Brentford

Senior career*
Years	Team	Apps	(Gls)
2013–2014	Billericay Town	27	(18)
2014–2015	Southend United	0	(0)
2014	→ Hayes & Yeading United (loan)	8	(3)
2015–2017	Alloa Athletic	36	(3)
2015–2016	→ Brechin City (loan)	21	(7)
2016	→ Stirling Albion (loan)	8	(3)
2017	Billericay Town	12	(5)
2017	Grays Athletic	16	(7)
2017–2018	Brechin City	34	(3)
2018	Stranraer	4	(1)
2019–2020	Dumbarton	21	(8)
2020–2021	Peterhead	8	(3)
2021	→ Dumbarton (loan)	2	(0)
2022	Cowdenbeath	0	(0)
2022	Cheshunt	0	(0)
2022	→ FC Romania (loan)	3	(0)
2023-	Bedford Town	0	(0)
- * Club domestic league appearances and goals as of 11:42, 17 September 2022 (UTC)

Carlos Lyon (born 16 May 1995) is an English footballer who plays as a forward for Cheshunt. He has previously played for Billericay Town (twice), Southend United, Alloa Athletic, Grays Athletic, Brechin City, Stranraer and Dumbarton (twice) as well as Hayes & Yeading United, Brechin City and Stirling Albion on loan, Recently in 2022 he signed for Lowland League side Cowdenbeath. He was previously known as Isaac Layne.

== Career ==
Lyon began his career as a youth with Football League side Brentford, but was released and signed for Isthmian League Premier Division team Billericay Town in October 2013, scoring two goals on his debut. In the summer of 2014, he trialled with Charlton Athletic and played a friendly match against Southend United, which inspired Southend manager Phil Brown to sign him on a one-year deal on 4 August. Layne was only included in the matchday squads for two Southend games: a 2–0 home win over Stevenage twelve days after signing, and a 1–0 victory against Hartlepool United at Roots Hall on 15 November.

On 27 November, he joined Conference South team Hayes & Yeading United on a month-long loan. He scored once in five appearances for the team, in a 2–1 home win over Chelmsford City on 20 December.

Lyon moved to Scottish Championship club Alloa Athletic on 25 January 2015, on a free transfer. He made his debut six days later, replacing Graeme Holmes in the 60th minute of an eventual 1–4 home defeat to Heart of Midlothian. On 5 April, he was a 69th-minute substitute for Michael Chopra in the 2015 Scottish Challenge Cup Final, a 4–0 loss to Livingston at McDiarmid Park in Perth. In November 2015, Layne signed on temporary loan with Scottish League One side Brechin City, scoring his first goal in a 4–0 win against Ayr United. After impressing manager Darren Dods with his performances, Layne's loan was initially extended until the end of the season, however he was recalled shortly after this agreement was put in place in order to help cover injuries sustained to the Alloa squad.

In August 2016, Lyon once again moved out on loan, this time to Scottish League Two side Stirling Albion initially until January 2017. Similar to his loan with Brechin, however, his time with Stirling was cut short, and he returned to Alloa in November 2016. Layne left Alloa on 6 January 2017 after the club agreed to terminate his contract.

After leaving Alloa, Lyon signed for Billericay Town for a second time, before finishing the season with Grays Athletic. Layne subsequently signed for Scottish Championship club Brechin City on 15 June 2017, where he had previously been on loan. Layne left the club at the end of the 2017–18 season. After a short spell with Stranraer which was ended by injury he signed for Dumbarton in June 2019. After scoring nine times in his first 15 starts for the Sons, he extended his deal until the end of the 2019–20 season in December 2019. He left the club in July 2020 after finishing the season as the club's top scorer, albeit without adding to his tally of nine goals in all competitions. Layne signed for Peterhead in August 2020 but struggled with injury before returning to Dumbarton on loan in March 2021. He made just two appearances for the Sons before being released by Peterhead in May 2021.

Lyon signed for Cowdenbeath on 16 September 2022.

On 24 December 2022, Lyon had left the club.

On 20 January 2023, Lyon signed for Cheshunt.
