= Callum Wilson (footballer, born 1999) =

Scottish footballer

Personal information
- Date of birth: 23 June 1999 (age 27)
- Position: Midfielder

Team information
- Current team: Forfar Athletic
- Number: 24

Youth career
- Partick Thistle

Senior career*
Years	Team	Apps	(Gls)
2018–2020	Partick Thistle	2	(0)
2019	→ Elgin City (loan)	10	(0)
2020	Dumbarton	3	(0)
2020–2023	Albion Rovers	83	(9)
2023–2024	Dumbarton	6	(0)
2024–2026	Cumbernauld Colts		
2026-	Forfar Athletic	16	(1)
- * Club domestic league appearances and goals as of 4 May 2026

Callum Wilson (born 23 June 1999) is a Scottish professional footballer who plays as a midfielder for Forfar Athletic.

== Career ==
Wilson began his career at Partick Thistle; he moved on loan to Elgin City in February 2019. Wilson left Thistle in January 2020.

After leaving Thistle, Wilson moved to Scottish League One side Dumbarton in January 2020. After making just five appearances for the club, he was released in July 2020,

Wilson then signed for Albion Rovers later that month. Wilson would go on to play over 100 games for Albion Rovers in all competitions.

Wilson rejoined Dumbarton in May 2023 following Rovers' relegation to the Lowland Football League. After a serious ankle injury, he eventually made his second debut for the club in March 2024, playing 60 minutes in a 6–2 victory against The Spartans. That would be one of just six appearances he would make for the club as they were promoted to Scottish League One, with Wilson leaving the club in May 2024.

Upon leaving Dumbarton, Wilson joined Lowland League club Cumbernauld Colts. He moved to Forfar Athletic in January 2026.
