= Ruaridh Langan =

Scottish footballer

Personal information
- Date of birth: 15 June 1998 (age 28)
- Place of birth: Greenock, Scotland
- Height: 1.73 m (5 ft 8 in)
- Position: Midfielder

Team information
- Current team: Auchinleck Talbot

Youth career
- Greenock Morton

Senior career*
Years	Team	Apps	(Gls)
2017–2019	Greenock Morton	3	(0)
2017	→ Neilston (loan)		
2018–2019	→ Annan Athletic (loan)	0	(0)
2019	Falkirk	0	(0)
2019–2021	Dumbarton	35	(1)
2021–2022	Stranraer	11	(0)
2022–2023	Beith Juniors		
2023–	Auchinleck Talbot		
- * Club domestic league appearances and goals as of 2 January 2022

Ruaridh Langan (born 15 June 1998) is a Scottish footballer who plays for Lowland League West club Auchinleck Talbot.

== Club career ==
Langan came through the Greenock Morton youth academy, to rise to become the captain of the successful under-20 side and spent time on loan at Neilston.

He made his first-team debut in a Scottish League Cup tie against Edinburgh City in July 2017.

In late September 2018, Langan and team-mate Lewis Strapp joined Annan Athletic on a short-term development loan. Langan signed for Falkirk in March 2019, leaving in the summer without making a senior appearance and teaming up with his former manager at Greenock Morton, Jim Duffy at Scottish League One club Dumbarton scoring his first goal in senior football in a 3-2 victory against Peterhead in August 2019. After playing 28 times in his first season with the club, he extended his deal for another season in July 2020. Langan left the club in May 2021 and joined League Two side Stranraer.

== Honours ==
- SPFL Development League West: Winners (2) 2015-16, 2017-18
