= 2018–19 Dumbarton F.C. season =

Dumbarton
2018–19 season
- Chairman: John Steele
- Manager: Stevie Aitken (until 8/10/2018) Ian Durrant and Jamie Ewings (Caretakers between 8/10/2018 and 20/10/2018) Jim Duffy (21/10/2018 -)
- Stadium: C&G Systems Stadium
- League One: 6th
- Challenge Cup: 2nd round (lost to Montrose)
- League Cup: Group Stage
- Scottish Cup: 3rd round (lost to Airdrieonians)
- Top goalscorer: League: Dom Thomas (14); All: Calum Gallagher & Dom Thomas (14)
- Highest home attendance: 1,353 (vs Kilmarnock 21 July 2018)
- Lowest home attendance: 425 (vs Queen's Park 17 July 2018)
- Average home league attendance: 637
Home colours	Away colours

Season 2018–19 was Dumbarton's first in the third tier of Scottish football for six years, having finished ninth and lost the playoffs in 2017–18. Dumbarton also competed in the Challenge Cup, Scottish League Cup and the Scottish Cup.

== Story of the season ==
=== May ===
Two days after the Sons' relegation to Scottish League One club director Callum Hosie died. The same day Tom Walsh became the first member of the squad to depart, joining Inverness Caledonian Thistle on a two-year deal. On 16 May the club released seven players, with David Smith, David Wilson, Kyle Prior, Grant Gallagher, Chris Johnston, Dougie Hill and Dimitris Froxylias all exiting. Meanwhile, Jamie Ewings was released as a player, but continued as the club's goalkeeper coach. Calum Gallagher, Scott Gallacher, Andy Dowie, Stuart Carswell, Kyle Hutton and Danny Handling were all offered new deals, whilst Christopher McLaughlin and Iain Russell were offered training facilities. Pre-season friendlies were then arranged against East Kilbride, Cumbernauld Colts and Queen's Park. Goalkeeper Scott Gallacher rejected a new deal to join Airdrieonians on 19 May, joining up with Grant Gallagher at the Lanarkshire side. Captain Andy Dowie was the first man to re-sign for the club, inking a one-year deal on 23 May, and he was followed by Kyle Hutton. Liam Dick left however, having made 17 appearances since signing in January 2018. Meanwhile, a fourth pre-season friendly was arranged against Heart of Midlothian on 7 July. Willie Dyer became the club's first signing of the summer on 30 May, joining on a year-long deal from Brechin City.

=== June ===
June started with striker Mark Stewart having the second year of his contract cancelled. Following this Turnberry Homes signed a new two-year deal to continue as the club's shirt sponsors. Bobby Barr became the club's second signing of the summer, joining on a year-long deal from Raith Rovers. Ross Forbes was announced as the club's third summer signing on 11 June – signing a season-long deal nine years after a loan spell with the club. A day later the club's top scorer from the 2017–18 season, Calum Gallagher, signed a new one-year deal. The week ended with Grant Adam becoming the club's fourth signing of the summer, joining on a one-year deal from Forfar Athletic. His arrival was followed by that of striker Rory Loy, who joined after leaving Falkirk, however Danny Handling turned down a new deal with the club to join Scottish League Two side Edinburgh City. Stuart Carswell was the next player to commit himself for another season, signing a new one-year deal after 54 appearances and two goals in his 18 months at the club. The following week defenders Ross Perry and Cammy Ballantyne signed for the club on year-long deals, and they were joined by Ryan Thomson who had left Stranraer. A day after signing Thomson marked his debut with a goal, which was added to by strikes from Calum Gallagher and Iain Russell (playing as a trialist) as Dumbarton overcame Lowland League side East Kilbride in their first friendly of the season.

=== July ===
Russell made it two in as many games, as he scored a late winner in a 3–2 comeback victory against Cumbernauld Colts on 1 July, with fellow trialist Andy Little also on target. That form earned him a new year long deal, and he made his third debut as a signed player in a 2–0 friendly defeat to Heart of Midlothian. Little also joined the club, on a short-term deal, on 11 July. A busy week also saw the arrival of goalkeeper Jamie McGowan, who joined having left Greenock Morton, and forward Michael Paton who had impressed as a trialist against Heart of Midlothian. In the Scottish League Cup Sons opened their season with a 0–0 draw against Lowland League champions Spartans, winning the bonus point on penalties after Grant Adam saved two spot-kicks. They followed that result up with a 1–0 victory over Queen's Park thanks to a Calum Gallagher goal, their first victory since the restructuring of the Cup in the summer of 2016. Defeat to Scottish Premiership Kilmarnock courtesy of a Kris Boyd hat-trick followed, despite the Sons taking the lead twice. Rory Loy made his debut for the club as a second-half substitute after missing the earlier games through injury, with Craig Barr and Bobby Barr (his first goal for the club) scoring for Dumbarton. The League Cup campaign ended on a low note however, with a 6–0 defeat to St Mirren.

=== August ===
Dumbarton kicked off their league campaign with a 2–0 victory against East Fife, with Andy Dowie scoring his first goal for the club. That was followed by a 2–0 home defeat to Forfar Athletic. The club did progress to the 2nd round of the Scottish Challenge Cup however, with Michael Paton scoring his first goal for the club in a 2–1 victory against Scottish Championship side Greenock Morton. That was followed by a 1–1 draw at home with Arbroath, with Ross Forbes scoring an injury-time leveler, before defeat against Brechin City, where the Sons threw away a two-goal lead with 30 minutes remaining. Bobby Barr and trialist Brad Spencer got the goals. With the squad down to bare bones Stevie Aitken dipped into the transfer market once more – signing Spencer on a permanent deal along with Dundee United defender Scott Allardice. On deadline day Jack Aitchison became the 14th signing of the summer – joining on a loan deal until January from Celtic.

=== September ===
September opened with another defeat, this time against newly promoted Stenhousemuir. Craig McPherson was appointed first-team coach a week later, but a third consecutive loss followed, this time in the Scottish Challenge Cup against Montrose. The same opponents visited a week later in the league, and this time Dumbarton recorded victory. Two goals inside two minutes from Andy Dowie and Ross Forbes gave the Sons their first home league win since early April. Brad Spencer scored his first goal as a signed player for the club a week later, but it was cancelled out by a Cammy Russell strike as Sons drew their next game against Airdrieonians. The month ended with a 5–1 home defeat to Raith Rovers. On the final day of the transfer window Dom Thomas became the club's 15th signing of the summer – joining on a four-month loan from Kilmarnock.

=== October ===
With Grant Adam injured, Sons turned to the transfer market again – bringing in Robbie Mutch on an emergency loan deal. Mutch made his debut the following day in a 3–2 defeat to Stranraer that saw Sons end the first quarter in ninth position – only ahead of Montrose on goal difference. Two days later Stephen Aitken was sacked having been in charge since May 2015. Ian Durrant and Jamie Ewings were put in temporary charge for the trip to Arbroath which Sons lost 3–1. On 21 October Jim Duffy was announced as the club's new manager with Craig McPherson returning to the club as his assistant a fortnight after leaving his position as first team coach. His first action was to sign goalkeeper Chris Smith on loan from East Kilbride after Falkirk recalled Robbie Mutch. Smith debuted that weekend, keeping a clean sheet in a 4–0 victory against East Fife in Duffy's first game in charge.

=== November ===
Dumbarton failed to build on that result however, falling to the foot of the Scottish League One table after a 1–0 defeat to Montrose on 3 November. Three days later striker Andrew Little announced his retirement from football. A 2–1 home victory against Stenhousemuir followed, before Sons were able to name just two outfield subs in a 3–0 defeat to Forfar Athletic. The following week another 3–0 defeat followed, this time against Airdrieonians in the Scottish Cup.

=== December ===
The inconsistent form continued into December, as Sons opened the month with a 4–1 victory against Brechin City, thanks to a brace from Calum Gallagher and goals from Ross Forbes and Dom Thomas. A week later an injury time Brad Spencer goal rescued a point at home to Airdrieonians, before Sons lost 4–2 to Raith Rovers – conceding twice in the final two minutes. Their final home game of 2018 ended in a 1–0 defeat to Stranraer, before an injury time Ross Forbes free-kick earned a point against Stenhousemuir in their final game of 2018. The year ended with kit coordinator Colm McKinlay, who had been with the club since Stephen Aitken's appointment in 2015, resigning from the position.

=== January ===
2019 opened with Scott Allardice returning to parent club Dundee United. A day later Dumbarton suffered their second consecutive home defeat, losing 3–2 to Forfar Athletic with Bobby Barr scoring twice. Ben Armour became the club's first signing of the window, joining on a development loan from Greenock Morton, whilst Dom Thomas returned to Kilmarnock at the end of his loan spell. Armour made his debut the next day, starting in a 1–0 defeat to ninth placed Brechin City, where Sons conceded in injury time and played half-an-hour with ten men following the dismissal of Michael Paton. The following day club captain Andy Dowie left by mutual consent to focus on a career outside football. Dowie was followed by summer arrivals Brad Spencer and Jamie McGowan who were both released on 16 January. David Ferguson became the club's second signing of the window, joining on loan from Ayr United and his arrival was quickly followed by that of Henk van Schaik who joined on a temporary transfer from Livingston. Both players made their debut in a 1–1 draw with Montrose, with trialist striker Boris Melingui scoring for the Sons. Melingui signed a contract until the end of the season on 30 January and his arrival was followed by that of goalkeeper Conor Brennan who also joined following his release by Brechin City. On deadline day Dom Thomas returned to the club on loan from Kilmarnock.

=== February ===
Thomas marked his return with a goal and an assist in a 2–2 draw with Airdrieonians. He scored again a fortnight later, with Ross Forbes and Ross Perry also on the scoresheet as Dumbarton recorded their first away victory since the opening day against Stranraer in Ross Forbes' first game as club captain. Meanwhile, Robert Brooks was appointed the club's new kit coordinator, replacing Colm McKinlay who had resigned in December. Sons made it two away wins in a row, with Thomas getting his first senior hat-trick in a 4–3 success against East Fife. The month ended with a 2–2 draw against Raith Rovers, with Ross Forbes and Stuart Carswell on the scoresheet.

=== March ===
The positive form continued into March, as Sons opened the month with a 2–0 victory against league leaders Arbroath. Defender Brian McLean became Sons' 23rd signing of the season on 6 March, joining on a deal until the end of the season having left Brunei based DPMM FC. Dom Thomas and Jim Duffy were then announced as the League One Player of the Month for February. McLean made his debut the following weekend in a 1–3 victory against Montrose as Dumbarton went seven league games unbeaten for the first time since early 2014. After a game against Airdrieonians fell to the weather, Sons unbeaten run ended on 23 March with a 4–1 defeat to Raith Rovers. The following week Sons suffered another loss, this time against Stenhousemuir.

=== April ===
April opened with Dumbarton drawing their re-arranged League One match with Airdrieonians 3–3 thanks to goals from Dom Thomas, Calum Gallagher and Ross Forbes. Sons then recorded their first victory in three games with a 2–1 triumph against Brechin City thanks to an own-goal from former Dumbarton player Dougie Hill and a Calum Gallagher header. A scoreless draw with Forfar Athletic followed, leaving Sons four points clear of the bottom two positions with three games remaining. Safety was secured a week later with a 3–0 victory against East Fife – Sons' fourth success of the season against the Fifers. The following week forward Dom Thomas was nominated for PFA Scotland League One Players' Player of the Year after scoring 14 times in 24 games for the club. April ended with a 2–1 victory against Stranraer, with Ross Forbes and Calum Gallagher both scoring their 13th goals of the season. After the match Stuart Carswell was named as the club's Player of the Year, with Dom Thomas picking up the Young Player of the Year award.

=== May ===
May began with Calum Gallagher and Jim Duffy picking up the League One Player and Manager of the Month awards for April, Sons' second awards double of the season. The season ended with a 1–1 draw with Champions Arbroath, a result that left the Sons sixth in the table.

== First team transfers ==
- From end of 2017–18 season, to last match of season 2018–19

=== In ===
Player	From	League	Fee
(Scotland) Willie Dyer	Brechin City	Scottish League One	Free
(Scotland) Bobby Barr	Raith Rovers	Scottish League One	Free
(Scotland) Ross Forbes	Greenock Morton	Scottish Championship	Free
(Scotland) Grant Adam	Forfar Athletic	Scottish League One	Free
(Scotland) Rory Loy	Falkirk	Scottish Championship	Free
(Scotland) Ross Perry	Albion Rovers	Scottish League Two	Free
(Scotland) Cammy Ballantyne	Dundee United	Scottish Championship	Free
(Scotland) Ryan Thomson	Stranraer	Scottish League One	Free
(Northern Ireland) Andrew Little	Stirling Albion	Scottish League Two	Free
(Scotland) Jamie McGowan	Greenock Morton	Scottish Championship	Free
(Scotland) Michael Paton	Dunfermline Athletic	Scottish Championship	Free
(England) Brad Spencer	Kilmarnock	Scottish Premiership	Free
(Scotland) Scott Allardice	Dundee United	Scottish Championship	Loan
(Scotland) Jack Aitchison	Celtic	Scottish Premiership	Loan
(Scotland) Dom Thomas	Kilmarnock	Scottish Premiership	Loan
(Scotland) Robbie Mutch	Falkirk	Scottish Championship	Loan
(Scotland) Chris Smith	East Kilbride	Lowland Football League	Loan
(Scotland) Ben Armour	Greenock Morton	Scottish Championship	Loan
(Scotland) David Ferguson	Ayr United	Scottish Championship	Loan
(Netherlands) Henk van Schaik	Livingston	Scottish Premiership	Loan
(France) Boris Melingui	Brechin City	Scottish League One	Free
(Northern Ireland) Conor Brennan	Brechin City	Scottish League One	Free
(Northern Ireland) Brian McLean	DPMM FC	Singapore Premier League	Free

=== Out ===
Player	To	League	Fee
(Scotland) Tom Walsh	Inverness Caledonian Thistle	Scottish Championship	Free
(Scotland) David Smith	Stranraer	Scottish League One	Free
(Scotland) Kyle Prior	Released	N/A	Free
(Scotland) David Wilson	Annan Athletic	Scottish League Two	Free
(Scotland) Grant Gallagher	Airdrieonians	Scottish League One	Free
(Scotland) Dougie Hill	Brechin City	Scottish League One	Free
(Scotland) Chris Johnston	Annan Athletic	Scottish League Two	Free
(Cyprus) Dimitris Froxylias	Falkirk	Scottish Championship	Free
(Scotland) Scott Gallacher	Airdrieonians	Scottish League One	Free
(France) Christian Nadé	Troon	SJFA West Region Premiership	Free
(Scotland) Liam Dick	Alloa Athletic	Scottish Championship	Free
(Scotland) Mark Stewart	Stirling Albion	Scottish League Two	Free
(Scotland) Danny Handling	Edinburgh City	Scottish League Two	Free
(Scotland) Christopher McLaughlin	Stirling Lions SC	National Premier Leagues Western Australia	Free
(Northern Ireland) Andrew Little	Retired	N/A	N/A
(Scotland) Andy Dowie	Edusport Academy	Lowland Football League	Free
(England) Brad Spencer	Forfar Athletic	Scottish League One	Free

== Fixtures and results ==
Win Draw Loss Upcoming fixture

=== Friendlies ===
30 June 2018 Friendly	East Kilbride	1–3	Dumbarton	East Kilbride
15:00	Paul Woods 58'	Report	Calum Gallagher 30'; Ryan Thomson 48'; Iain Russell(T) 89'	Stadium: K-Park Training Academy; Attendance: 150

2 July 2018 Friendly	Cumbernauld Colts	2–3	Dumbarton	Cumbernauld
19:45	Jordan Marshall 4', Paul Nash 20'	Report	OG 42'; Andy Little(T) 69'; Iain Russell(T) 85'	Stadium: Broadwood Stadium; Attendance: 100

7 July 2018 Friendly	Dumbarton	0–2	Hearts	Dumbarton
15:00		Report	Uche Ikpeazu 12' (pen.), 85'	Stadium: Dumbarton Football Stadium; Attendance: 442; Referee: Steven McLean

17 January 2019 Friendly	Dumbarton	3–0	Kilbirnie Ladeside
	Ben Armour, Stuart Carswell, Boris Melingui	Report

=== Scottish League One ===
4 August 2018 League One	East Fife	0–2	Dumbarton	Bayview Stadium
15:00		Report	Andy Dowie 47'; Calum Gallagher 61'	Attendance: 525; Referee: Grant Irvine

11 August 2018 League One	Dumbarton	0–2	Forfar Athletic	Dumbarton Football Stadium
15:00		Report	John Baird 27', 70'	Attendance: 575; Referee: David Munro

18 August 2018 League One	Dumbarton	1–1	Arbroath	Dumbarton Football Stadium
15:00	Ross Forbes 90+1'	Report	Bobby Linn 26'	Attendance: 627; Referee: Kevin Graham; Man of the Match: Ryan Thomson

25 August 2018 League One	Brechin City	3–2	Dumbarton	Glebe Park
15:00	Boris Melingui 60'; Callum Tapping 77', Boris Melingui 90+3'	Report	Bobby Barr 18', Brad Spencer (Trialist) 56'	Attendance: 371; Referee: Mike Roncone

1 September 2018 League One	Stenhousemuir	2–1	Dumbarton	Ochilview
15:00	Seb Ross 11'; Conner Duthie 80'	Report	Bobby Barr 6'	Attendance: 616; Referee: Alan Newlands

15 September 2018 League One	Dumbarton	2–1	Montrose	Dumbarton Football Stadium
15:00	Andy Dowie 69'; Ross Forbes 71' (pen.)	Report	Craig Johnston 42'; Michael Bolochoweckyj (red card) 73'	Attendance: 529; Referee: David Dickinson; Man of the Match: Ross Forbes

22 September 2018 League One	Airdrieonians	1–1	Dumbarton	Excelsior Stadium
15:00	Cammy Russell 70'	Report	Brad Spencer 29'	Attendance: 777; Referee: John McKendrick

29 September 2018 League One	Dumbarton	1–5	Raith Rovers	Dumbarton Football Stadium
15:00	Calum Gallagher 71'	Report	Lewis Vaughan 1', Nathan Flannagan 12', 33'; Kevin Nisbet 37'; Liam Buchanan 87'	Attendance: 756; Referee: Steven Reid

6 October 2018 League One	Stranraer	3–2	Dumbarton	Stair Park
15:00	Grant Anderson 9', David Brownlie 34'; PJ Crossan 65'	Report	Ross Forbes 11'; Dom Thomas 60'	Attendance: 305; Referee: Barry Cook; Man of the Match: Connor McManus

20 October 2018 League One	Arbroath	3–1	Dumbarton	Gayfield Park
15:00	Ryan Wallace 61'; Steven Doris 75'; Gavin Swankie 77'	Report	Iain Russell 15'	Attendance: 700; Referee: Alan Newlands

27 October 2018 League One	Dumbarton	4–0	East Fife	Dumbarton Football Stadium
15:00	Calum Gallagher 7'; Bobby Barr 45+1'; Stuart Carswell 51'; Dom Thomas 71'	Report	Ross Davidson (yellow card) 68' (yellow-red card) 69'	Attendance: 713; Referee: Greg Aitken; Man of the Match: Calum Gallagher

3 November 2018 League One	Montrose	1–0	Dumbarton	Links Park
15:00	Graham Webster 53'	Report		Attendance: 549; Referee: John McKendrick

10 November 2018 League One	Dumbarton	2–1	Stenhousemuir	Dumbarton Football Stadium
15:00	Ross Forbes 23' (pen.); Dom Thomas 56'	Report	Mark McGuigan 33' (pen.)	Attendance: 605; Referee: David Lowe; Man of the Match: Dom Thomas

17 November 2018 League One	Forfar Athletic	3–0	Dumbarton	Station Park
15:00	Darren Whyte 49'; John Baird 54'; Mark Hill 78'	Report		Attendance: 491; Referee: Lloyd Wilson

1 December 2018 League One	Dumbarton	4–1	Brechin City	Dumbarton Football Stadium
15:00	Calum Gallagher 52', 83'; Ross Forbes 54'; Dom Thomas 69'	Report	Jordan Sinclair 71'	Attendance: 456; Referee: Craig Napier; Man of the Match: Dom Thomas

8 December 2018 League One	Dumbarton	1–1	Airdrieonians	Dumbarton Football Stadium
15:00	Brad Spencer 90'	Report	Leighton McIntosh 3'	Attendance: 624; Referee: Colin Steven; Man of the Match: Dom Thomas

15 December 2018 League One	Raith Rovers	4–2	Dumbarton	Stark's Park
15:00	Daniel Armstrong 13'; Kevin Nisbet 63'; Euan Murray 88'; Lewis Vaughan 90'	Report	Ross Forbes 10'; Michael Paton 20'	Attendance: 1,089; Referee: Barry Cook

22 December 2018 League One	Dumbarton	0–1	Stranraer	Dumbarton Football Stadium
15:00		Report	Kyle Turner 66'	Attendance: 686; Referee: John McKendrick; Man of the Match: Dom Thomas

29 December 2018 League One	Stenhousemuir	2–2	Dumbarton	Ochilview Park
15:00	Harry Paton 8'; Mark McGuigan 54'; Conor McBreaty (yellow card) 58' (yellow-red card) 90+1'	Report	Ross Forbes 45', 90+2'	Attendance: 536; Referee: Mike Roncone

5 January 2019 League One	Dumbarton	2–3	Forfar Athletic	Dumbarton Football Stadium
15:00	Bobby Barr 18', 85'	Report	Dale Hilson 4'; John Baird 37'; Dylan Easton 41'	Attendance: 619; Referee: Alan Muir; Man of the Match: Bobby Barr

12 January 2019 League One	Brechin City	1–0	Dumbarton	Glebe Park
15:00	J.Tapping 90+3'	Report	Michael Paton (yellow card) 38' (yellow-red card) 60'	Attendance: 456; Referee: Gavin Duncan

26 January 2019 League One	Dumbarton	1–1	Montrose	Dumbarton Football Stadium
15:00	Boris Melingui 83'	Report	Martin Rennie 89' (pen.)	Attendance: 521; Referee: Barry Cook; Man of the Match: Boris Melingui

2 February 2019 League One	Airdrieonians	2–2	Dumbarton	Excelsior Stadium
15:00	Darryl Duffy 2'; Leighton McIntosh 64'	Report	Bobby Barr 56'; Dom Thomas 86'	Attendance: 709; Referee: John McKendrick

16 February 2019 League One	Stranraer	0–3	Dumbarton	Stair Park
15:00	Andy McDonald (yellow card) 70' (yellow-red card) 73'	Report	Ross Forbes 56'; Dom Thomas 80'; Ross Perry 83'	Attendance: 327; Referee: Grant Irvine

23 February 2019 League One	East Fife	3–4	Dumbarton	Bayview Stadium
15:00	Pat Slattery 54'; Kevin Smith 58', Anton Dowds 65'; Chris Kane (red card) 77'	Report	Dom Thomas 20', 42', 62'; Calum Gallagher 36'	Attendance: 571; Referee: Gavin Ross

26 February 2019 League One	Dumbarton	2–2	Raith Rovers	Dumbarton Football Stadium
15:00	Ross Forbes 27'; Stuart Carswell 33'	Report	Nathan Flanagan 19'; Kevin Nisbet 90+2'	Attendance: 507; Referee: Alan Newlands; Man of the Match: Stuart Carswell

2 March 2019 League One	Dumbarton	2–0	Arbroath	Dumbarton Football Stadium
15:00	Ross Forbes 30' (pen.); Dom Thomas 52'	Report	Michael McKenna (yellow card) 67' (yellow-red card) 81'	Attendance: 700; Referee: Scott Millar; Man of the Match: Bobby Barr

9 March 2019 League One	Montrose	1–3	Dumbarton	Links Park
15:00	Seán Dillon 51'	Report	Dom Thomas 17', 59'; Calum Gallagher 37'	Attendance: 574; Referee: Graham Beaton

23 March 2019 League One	Raith Rovers	4–1	Dumbarton	Stark's Park
15:00	Ross Matthews 9'; Liam Buchanan 26'; Kevin Nisbet 45', 55'	Report	Calum Gallagher 38'	Attendance: 1,338; Referee: Greg Aitken; Man of the Match: Jamie Gullan

30 March 2019 League One	Dumbarton	1–2	Stenhousemuir	Dumbarton Football Stadium
15:00	Craig Barr 85'	Report	David Marsh 28'; Conor McBrearty 72'	Attendance: 613; Referee: Steven Reid; Man of the Match: Boris Melingui

2 April 2019 League One	Dumbarton	3–3	Airdrieonians	Dumbarton Football Stadium
19:45	Dom Thomas 21'; Calum Gallagher 75'; Ross Forbes 82'	Report	Scott Stewart 27', 79'; Darryl Duffy 32'	Attendance: 691; Referee: Lloyd Wilson; Man of the Match: Cammy Ballantyne

6 April 2019 League One	Dumbarton	2–1	Brechin City	Dumbarton Football Stadium
15:00	OG 36'; Calum Gallagher 38'	Report	Dougie Hill 17'	Attendance: 531; Referee: Colin Steven; Man of the Match: Kyle Hutton

13 April 2019 League One	Forfar Athletic	0–0	Dumbarton	Station Park
15:00		Report		Attendance: 554; Referee: Alan Muir; Man of the Match: Brad Spencer

20 April 2019 League One	Dumbarton	3–0	East Fife	Dumbarton Football Stadium
15:00	Craig Barr 20'; Dom Thomas 44'; Calum Gallagher 66'	Report		Attendance: 659; Referee: Grant Irvine; Man of the Match: Dom Thomas

27 April 2019 League One	Dumbarton	2–1	Stranraer	Dumbarton Football Stadium
15:00	Calum Gallagher 8'; Ross Forbes 19'	Report	Innes Cameron 54'	Attendance: 704; Referee: Alan Newlands; Man of the Match: Calum Gallagher

4 May 2019 League One	Arbroath	1–1	Dumbarton	Gayfield Park
15:00	Michael McKenna 62' (pen.)	Report	Calum Gallagher 54'; Cammy Ballantyne (red card) 61'	Attendance: 1,373; Referee: Peter Stewart

=== Scottish Cup ===
24 November 2018 Third Round	Airdrieonians	3–0	Dumbarton	Airdrie
15:00	Kyle Wilkie 26', 77'; Darryl Duffy 36'	Report		Stadium: Excelsior Stadium; Attendance: 592; Referee: Steven Kirkland

=== Scottish League Cup ===
==== Table ====
Pos	Team	Pld	W	PW	PL	L	GF	GA	GD	Pts	Qualification	KIL	STM	DUM	QPA	SPA
1	Kilmarnock (Q)	4	3	0	1	0	9	2	+7	10	Qualification for the Second round	—	0–0p	—	2–0	—
2	St Mirren (Q)	4	1	3	0	0	8	2	+6	9	Qualification for the Second round	—	—	6–0	—	p2–2
3	Dumbarton	4	1	1	0	2	3	10	−7	5		2–4	—	—	1–0	—
4	Queen's Park	4	1	0	1	2	2	4	−2	4		—	0–0p	—	—	2–1
5	Spartans	4	0	0	2	2	3	7	−4	2		0–3	—	0–0p	—	—

Rules for classification: 1) goal difference, 2) goals scored, 3) away goals scored, 4) matches won, 5) away matches won, 6) drawing of lots.
(Q) Qualified to the phase indicated

==== Matches ====
14 July 2018 Group stage	Spartans	0–0 (3–4 p)	Dumbarton	Edinburgh
15:00		Report		Stadium: Ainslie Park; Attendance: 245; Referee: Stephen Brown

17 July 2018 Group stage	Dumbarton	1–0	Queen's Park	Dumbarton
19:45	Calum Gallagher 35'	Report		Stadium: Dumbarton Football Stadium; Attendance: 425; Referee: Gavin Ross

21 July 2018 Group stage	Dumbarton	2–4	Kilmarnock	Dumbarton
15:00	Craig Barr 41'; Bobby Barr 65'	Report	Mikael Ndjoli 48'; Kris Boyd 68', 76', 90'	Stadium: Dumbarton Football Stadium; Attendance: 1,353; Referee: Craig Thomson

28 July 2018 Group stage	St Mirren	6–0	Dumbarton	Paisley
15:00	Hayden Coulson 1'; Cammy Smith 35', 84'; Ross Stewart 48'; Stephen McGinn 53'; James Kellermann 82'	Report		Stadium: St Mirren Park; Attendance: 1,610; Referee: Euan Anderson

=== Scottish Challenge Cup ===
14 August 2018 1st Round	Dumbarton	2–1	Greenock Morton	Dumbarton
19:45	Michael Paton 12'; Iain Russell 26'	Report	Gary Oliver 39'	Stadium: Dumbarton Football Stadium; Attendance: 680; Referee: Gavin Ross

8 September 2018 2nd Round	Dumbarton	0–1	Montrose	Dumbarton
15:00		Report	Craig Johnston 19'	Stadium: Dumbarton Football Stadium; Attendance: 456; Referee: David Munro

== League table ==
Pos	Team	Pld	W	D	L	GF	GA	GD	Pts	Promotion, qualification or relegation
4	Montrose	36	15	6	15	49	50	−1	51	Qualification for the Championship play-offs
5	Airdrieonians	36	14	6	16	51	44	+7	48	
6	Dumbarton	36	12	10	14	60	60	0	46	
7	East Fife	36	13	7	16	49	56	−7	46	
8	Stranraer	36	11	9	16	45	57	−12	42	

Source: SPFL
Rules for classification: 1) Points; 2) Goal difference; 3) Number of goals scored

== Player statistics ==
As of 4 May 2019 21:11 (UTC)

=== All competitions ===
#	Position	Player	Starts	Subs	Unused subs	Goals	Red cards (red card)	Yellow cards (yellow card)
1	GK	(Scotland) Grant Adam	26	0	2	0	0	1
19	FW	(Scotland) Jack Aitchison	4	0	0	0	0	0
18	DF	(Scotland) Scott Allardice	10	3	3	0	0	5
16	FW	(Scotland) Ben Armour	3	7	6	0	0	2
2	DF	(Scotland) Cammy Ballantyne	31	1	3	0	1	2
11	MF	(Scotland) Bobby Barr	39	4	0	7	0	4
55	DF	(Scotland) Craig Barr	19	2	3	3	0	3
21	GK	(Northern Ireland) Conor Brennan	2	0	9	0	0	0
6	MF	(Scotland) Stuart Carswell	36	2	2	2	0	8
4	DF	(Scotland) Andy Dowie	26	0	0	2	0	1
3	DF	(Scotland) Willie Dyer	20	1	2	0	0	2
21	GK	(Scotland) Jamie Ewings (Trialist)	0	0	3	0	0	0
12	DF	(Scotland) David Ferguson	15	0	0	0	0	1
10	MF	(Scotland) Ross Forbes	37	6	0	13	0	6
9	FW	(Scotland) Calum Gallagher	31	9	3	14	0	1
8	MF	(Scotland) Kyle Hutton	40	1	1	0	0	7
7	FW	(Northern Ireland) Andrew Little	2	9	2	0	0	1
33	FW	(Scotland) Rory Loy	7	5	0	0	0	1
17	GK	(Scotland) Jamie McGowan	4	1	22	0	0	0
4	DF	(Northern Ireland) Brian McLean	7	0	1	0	0	1
21	GK	(Scotland) Robbie Mutch	2	0	0	0	0	0
7	FW	(France) Boris Melingui	3	9	2	1	0	1
15	FW	(Scotland) Michael Paton	20	10	2	2	1	3
5	DF	(Scotland) Ross Perry	16	1	4	1	0	4
14	FW	(Scotland) Iain Russell	10	12	7	2	0	2
21	GK	(Scotland) Chris Smith	9	1	1	0	0	0
12	MF	(England) Brad Spencer	10	9	1	3	0	4
20	MF	(Scotland) Dom Thomas	26	0	0	14	0	1
23	MF	(Scotland) Ryan Thomson	14	11	6	0	0	6
21	GK	(France) Eric Tshibangu (Trialist)	0	0	1	0	0	0
18	DF	(Netherlands) Henk van Schaik	5	1	1	0	0	1

=== Captains ===
No.	P	Name	Country	No. games	Notes
4	DF	Andy Dowie	(Scotland)	26	
8	MF	Kyle Hutton	(Scotland)	4	
10	MF	Ross Forbes	(Scotland)	13	

Last updated: As of match played 4 May 2019
Source: Competitive match reports.
Competitive matches only
Matches started as captain only
Country: FIFA nationality; No.: Squad number; P: Position; Name: Player name; No. Games: Number of games started as captain.

=== Management statistics ===
Last Updated 19:37 April 27, 2019

Name	From	To	P	W	D	L	Win%
Stephen Aitken	14 July 2018	8 October 2018	15	4	3	8	26.67
Ian Durrant & Jamie Ewings (Caretakers)	9 October 2018	20 October 2018	1	0	0	1	0.00
Jim Duffy	21 October 2018	Present	27	10	8	9	37.03
