= 2011–12 Rangers F.C. season =

Rangers
2011–12 season
- Chairman: Craig Whyte
- Manager: Ally McCoist
- Ground: Ibrox Stadium
- Scottish Premier League: 2nd (Expelled from league)
- Scottish Cup: Fifth round
- League Cup: Third round
- UEFA Champions League: Third qualifying round
- UEFA Europa League: Play-off round
- Top goalscorer: League: Nikica Jelavić (14); All: Nikica Jelavić (17)
- Highest home attendance: 50,268 v Kilmarnock (18 February 2012)
- Lowest home attendance: 17,822 v Dundee United (5 February 2012)
Home colours	Away colours	Third colours

The 2011–12 season was the 132nd season in the history of Rangers Football Club. They played in the Scottish Premier League in their 115th consecutive top tier season of Scottish Football. This would be their last season in the top tier until 2016 due to the liquidation of the company, with the club re-entering the league through the Scottish Third Division in the next season.

== Overview ==
Rangers played a total of 45 competitive matches during the 2011–12 season. Smith's deputy and Rangers record goalscorer Ally McCoist was appointed manager of the club. However, McCoist was hampered by a bizarre transfer policy the club utilised under Whyte's control. This resulted in protracted transfer negotiations with several targets but without significant recruitment and this probably contributed to Rangers being knocked out of both the UEFA Champions League and the UEFA Europa League by the end of August, depriving the club of income that may have been anticipated. With the new ownership there initially appeared to be some financial stability of the club. A number of first-team regulars were secured on long-term contract extensions including Steven Davis, Allan McGregor, Steven Whittaker and Gregg Wylde. When McCoist entered the transfer market, his first signing being Almería midfielder Juan Manuel Ortiz, he soon encountered difficulties. A number of highly publicised failed transfers, including deals for Wesley Verhoek and Roland Juhász, led to many doubting Whyte's financial prowess.

Rangers' first Scottish Premier League match of the season was a home match against Jim Jefferies' Heart of Midlothian, where the league flag was unfurled by then chairman Craig Whyte, as Rangers were under considerable pressure for most of the first half but managed to salvage a draw. The following week, McCoist claimed his first competitive victory as manager with a win over St Johnstone. The season proved to be a baptism of fire for McCoist, by early October the club held a ten-point lead over Celtic, and on 5 November the lead stood at fifteen points over Celtic and twelve over second placed Motherwell. However, a draw with St Johnstone and subsequent defeats to Kilmarnock, St Mirren and Old Firm rivals Celtic, who then went on a run of twenty-one matches undefeated saw Rangers slip to second place where the club remained for the rest of the season.

Rangers' European adventure began in the middle of the final week of July, where Rangers were defeated by underdogs Malmö 1–0 at home and Rangers crashed out of the Champions League with a bad tempered 1–1 draw in Sweden in which both Steven Whittaker and Madjid Bougherra were both given their marching orders, and ultimately relegating the Gers to the Europa League play-off round, where they faced Slovenian team NK Maribor. In cup competitions the club fair no better, a third round defeat to First Division side Falkirk in the League Cup and a fifth round exit at home at the hands of Dundee United in the Scottish Cup.

On 13 February 2012, Rangers filed legal papers at the Court of Session giving notice of their intention to appoint administrators. Rangers officially entered administration on the following day, appointing London-based financial advisers Duff & Phelps as administrators. Rangers entered administration over an alleged non-payment of £9m in PAYE and VAT taxes to HM Revenue and Customs. On entering administration, the team was docked ten points by the SPL, a move regarded as 'effectively ending' its 2012 championship challenge. A failure then to submit accounts for 2011 meant the club was not granted a licence to play in European football in season 2012–13. In April it was revealed that the club's total debts could be as high as £134m.

On 13 May it was revealed that Whyte sold his controlling interest in The Rangers Football Club Plc for £2 to a consortium led by Charles Green. Green offered the creditors a settlement, in the form of a company voluntary arrangement (CVA), in an attempt to exit administration. On 12 June 2012, it emerged that HMRC would reject the CVA put forward by Green. Green's takeover of the club depended on the CVA being accepted by HMRC, which would have seen only £8.5m of the total debt repaid. The formal rejection of the CVA, two days later, meant that the Rangers Football Club Plc entered the liquidation process and the club would have to reform with new corporate ownership. The oldco's assets, including Rangers F.C., Ibrox Stadium and Rangers Training Centre, were sold to Sevco 5088 Ltd, a consortium led by Green, in a deal worth £5.5m.

== Players ==
=== Squad information ===
N	Pos.	Nat.	Name	Age	Since	App	Goals	Ends	Transfer fee	Notes
1	GK	(Scotland)	Allan McGregor	30	1998	278	0	2017	Youth system	
2	DF	(Romania)	Dorin Goian	31	2011	38	1	2014	£0.8m	
3	DF	(Scotland)	David Weir (captain)	41	2007 (Winter)	231	5	2012	Free	left on 17 January
4	DF	(Scotland)	Kirk Broadfoot	27	2007	116	1	2013	Free	
5	DF	(Bosnia and Herzegovina)	Saša Papac	32	2006	227	7	2012	£0.45m	
6	MF	(Scotland)	Lee McCulloch	33	2007	173	20	2013	£2.25m	
7	MF	(United States)	Maurice Edu	26	2008	125	12	2013	£2.6m	
8	MF	(Northern Ireland)	Steven Davis (captain)	27	2008	211	22	2016	£3m	
9	FW	(Croatia)	Nikica Jelavić	26	2010	55	36	2014	£4m	left on 31 January
10	MF	(Scotland)	John Fleck	20	2007	58	3	2013	Youth system	
11	FW	(Northern Ireland)	Kyle Lafferty	24	2008	138	38	2013	£3.25m	
12	DF	(Scotland)	Lee Wallace	24	2011	34	2	2016	£1.5m	
14	FW	(Scotland)	Steven Naismith	25	2008	140	33	2015	£1.9m	
15	FW	(Northern Ireland)	David Healy	32	2011 (Winter)	25	5	2012	Free	
16	DF	(Scotland)	Steven Whittaker	27	2007	209	28	2016	£2m	
17	MF	(Spain)	Juan Manuel Ortiz	30	2011	14	1	2014	£0.5m	
18	DF	(United States)	Carlos Bocanegra (vc)	32	2011	34	3	2014	£0.4m	
19	FW	(England)	James Beattie	33	2010	10	0	2012	£1.25m	left on 31 August
19	MF	(Nigeria)	Sone Aluko	23	2011	23	12	2012	£0.15m	
20	MF	(Australia)	Matt McKay	29	2011	3	0	2014	£0.32m	left on 27 February
21	MF	(United States)	Alejandro Bedoya	25	2011	13	1	2014	£0.4m	
22	DF	(England)	Kyle Bartley	20	2011	30	1	2012	Loan	
23	DF	(Scotland)	Jordan McMillan	23	2005	5	0	2012	Youth system	left on 31 January
24	DF	(Algeria)	Madjid Bougherra	28	2008	113	5	2012	£2.5m	left on 10 August
24	MF	(Sweden)	Mervan Çelik	21	2012 (Winter)	6	0	2015	£0.25m	left on 6 March
25	GK	(Scotland)	Neil Alexander	34	2008 (Winter)	47	0	2013	Free	
26	MF	(Scotland)	Jamie Ness	21	2007	18	2	2015	Youth system	
27	MF	(Scotland)	Gregg Wylde	20	2007	48	2	2016	Youth system	left on 6 March
28	MF	(Algeria)	Salim Kerkar	24	2010	18	2	2012	Free	
32	DF	(Scotland)	Ross Perry	22	2006	13	0	2015	Youth system	
33	MF	(Norway)	Thomas Kind Bendiksen	22	2007	3	0	2012	£0.09m	left on 1 January
34	FW	(Northern Ireland)	Andrew Little	23	2007	24	7	2012	Youth system	
35	MF	(Scotland)	Kyle Hutton	21	2008	14	0	2014	Youth system	out on season loan
38	FW	(England)	Kane Hemmings	21	2008	5	0	2013	Youth system	
40	MF	(Northern Ireland)	Andrew Mitchell	20	2010	2	0	2012	Free	
41	MF	(Scotland)	Rhys McCabe	19	2009	9	0	2015	Youth system	
69	FW	(Scotland)	Barrie McKay	17	2011	1	0	2013	Free	

- Last updated: 13 May 2012
- Source: Players transfer, Wikipedia players' articles
- Ordered by squad numbers.

=== Transfers ===
==== In ====
No.	Pos.	Nat.	Name	Age	Moving from	Type	Transfer window	Ends	Transfer fee	Source
17	MF	(Spain)	Juan Manuel Ortiz	29	Almería (Spain)	Transfer	Summer	2014	£0.5m	
12	DF	(Scotland)	Lee Wallace	23	Heart of Midlothian	Transfer	Summer	2016	£1.5m	
2	DF	(Romania)	Dorin Goian	30	Palermo (Italy)	Transfer	Summer	2014	£0.8m	
22	DF	(England)	Kyle Bartley	20	Arsenal (England)	Loan extension	Summer	2012	n/a	
21	MF	(United States)	Alejandro Bedoya	24	Örebro SK (Sweden)	Transfer	Summer	2014	£0.4m	
18	DF	(United States)	Carlos Bocanegra	32	Saint-Étienne (France)	Transfer	Summer	2014	£0.4m	
20	MF	(Australia)	Matt McKay	28	Brisbane Roar (Australia)	Transfer	Summer	2014	£0.32m	
19	MF	(Nigeria)	Sone Aluko	22	Aberdeen	Transfer	n/a	2012	£0.15m	
24	MF	(Sweden)	Mervan Çelik	21	GAIS (Sweden)	Transfer	Winter	2015	£0.24m	

Last updated: 11 February 2012
Total spending: £4.31m

==== Out ====
No.	Pos.	Nat.	Name	Age	Moving to	Type	Transfer window	Transfer fee	Source
20	MF	(Slovakia)	Vladimír Weiss	21	Manchester City (England)	Loan return	Summer	n/a	
12	DF	(Scotland)	Richard Foster	25	Aberdeen	Loan return	Summer	n/a	
17	FW	(Senegal)	El Hadji Diouf	30	Blackburn Rovers (England)	Loan return	Summer	n/a	
37	MF	(Scotland)	Andrew Shinnie	22	Inverness Caledonian Thistle	End of contract	Summer	n/a	
38	MF	(Scotland)	Stephen Stirling	22	Stranraer	End of contract	Summer	n/a	
41	FW	(Scotland)	Archie Campbell	21	Greenock Morton	End of contract	Summer	n/a	
42	GK	(Northern Ireland)	Wayne Drummond	19	Ballymena United (Northern Ireland)	End of contract	Summer	n/a	
49	FW	(Democratic Republic of the Congo)	Cristiano Kisuka	19	Beith Juniors	End of contract	Summer	n/a	
57	MF	(Scotland)	Dylan McGeouch	18	Celtic	End of contract	Summer	£0.1m	
65	MF	(England)	Steven Hetherington	17	Motherwell	End of contract	Summer	n/a	
31	GK	(Scotland)	Grant Adam	20	Forfar Athletic	Loan	Summer	n/a	
24	DF	(Algeria)	Madjid Bougherra	28	Lekhwiya (Qatar)	Transfer	Summer	£1.7m	
34	FW	(Northern Ireland)	Andrew Little	22	Port Vale (England)	Loan	Summer	n/a	
19	FW	(England)	James Beattie	33	Sheffield United	Contract terminated	Summer	n/a	
42	FW	(Scotland)	Kal Naismith	19	Cowdenbeath	Loan	Summer	n/a	
35	MF	(Scotland)	Kyle Hutton	20	Partick Thistle	Loan	Summer	n/a	
51	GK	(Scotland)	Blair Currie	18	Hamilton Academical	Loan	Winter	n/a	
33	MF	(Norway)	Thomas Kind Bendiksen	22	Tromsø (Norway)	End of contract	Winter	£0.25m	
36	DF	(Scotland)	Darren Cole	19	Partick Thistle	Loan	Winter	n/a	
59	FW	(England)	Sam McMahon	17	Doncaster Rovers (England)	Transfer	Winter	Free	
42	FW	(Scotland)	Kal Naismith	19	Partick Thistle	Loan	Winter	n/a	
3	DF	(Scotland)	David Weir	41	Free agent	Contract terminated	Winter	n/a	
10	MF	(Scotland)	John Fleck	20	Blackpool (England)	Loan	Winter	n/a	
31	GK	(Scotland)	Grant Adam	20	Airdrie United	Loan	Winter	n/a	
63	FW	(Sweden)	Freddie Espling	18	Djurgårdens IF (Sweden)	Transfer	Winter	Free	
45	MF	(Denmark)	Nicolaj Køhlert	19	Silkeborg IF (Denmark)	Transfer	Winter	Free	
17	MF	(Spain)	Juan Manuel Ortiz	29	Almería (Spain)	Loan	Winter	n/a	
23	DF	(Scotland)	Jordan McMillan	23	Dunfermline Athletic	Transfer	Winter	Undisclosed	
9	FW	(Croatia)	Nikica Jelavić	26	Everton (England)	Transfer	Winter	£5.5m	
35	MF	(Scotland)	Kyle Hutton	20	Dunfermline Athletic	Loan	Winter	n/a	
64	MF	(Scotland)	Marc Dyer	17	Ayr United	Transfer	Winter	Free	
61	FW	(England)	Jack Werndly	18	Albion Rovers	Loan	Winter	n/a	
20	MF	(Australia)	Matt McKay	29	Busan I'Park (South Korea)	Transfer	n/a	£0.063m	
24	MF	(Sweden)	Mervan Çelik	21	Free agent	Contract terminated	n/a	n/a	
27	MF	(Scotland)	Gregg Wylde	20	Free agent	Contract terminated	n/a	n/a	
52	DF	(Scotland)	Ewan McNeil	18	Airdrie United	Loan	n/a	n/a	

Last updated: 25 March 2012
Total income: £7.513m

==== New contracts ====
No.	Pos.	Nat.	Name	Age	Status	Contract length	Expiry date	Source
5	DF	(Bosnia and Herzegovina)	Saša Papac	31	Signed	1 year	June 2012	
32	MF	(Norway)	Thomas Kind Bendiksen	21	Signed	6 months	January 2012	
28	MF	(Algeria)	Salim Kerkar	23	Signed	1 year	June 2012	
15	FW	(Northern Ireland)	David Healy	31	Signed	1 year	June 2012	
29	FW	(Northern Ireland)	Andrew Little	22	Signed	1 year	June 2012	
1	GK	(Scotland)	Allan McGregor	29	Signed	6 years	June 2017	
16	DF	(Scotland)	Steven Whittaker	27	Signed	5 years	June 2016	
3	DF	(Scotland)	David Weir	41	Signed	1 year	June 2012	
8	MF	(Northern Ireland)	Steven Davis	26	Signed	5 years	June 2016	
27	MF	(Scotland)	Gregg Wylde	20	Signed	5 years	June 2016	
32	DF	(Scotland)	Ross Perry	21	Signed	4 years	June 2015	
23	DF	(Scotland)	Jordan McMillan	23	Rejected	3 years	June 2015	
33	MF	(Norway)	Thomas Kind Bendiksen	22	Rejected	2 years & 6 months	June 2014	
41	MF	(Scotland)	Rhys McCabe	19	Signed	3 years	June 2015	

Last updated: 2 January 2012

=== Squad statistics ===
				Total			Scottish Premier League		UEFA Champions League		Scottish Cup		League Cup		UEFA Europa League	
No.	Pos.	Nat.	Name	Sts	App	Gls	App	Gls	App	Gls	App	Gls	App	Gls	App	Gls
1	GK	(Scotland)	Allan McGregor	43	43		37		2		2				2	
2	DF	(Romania)	Dorin Goian	38	38	1	33				2		1	1	2	
3	DF	(Scotland)	David Weir	1	1				1							
4	DF	(Scotland)	Kirk Broadfoot	13	18		16								2	
5	DF	(Bosnia and Herzegovina)	Saša Papac	26	26		21		2		2		1			
6	MF	(Scotland)	Lee McCulloch	24	30	5	26	5	2				1		1	
7	MF	(United States)	Maurice Edu	40	42	3	36	3	2		2				2	
8	MF	(Northern Ireland)	Steven Davis	39	39	5	33	5	2		1		1		2	
9	FW	(Croatia)	Nikica Jelavić	26	28	17	22	14	2	1	1	1	1	1	2	
10	MF	(Scotland)	John Fleck	1	5		4				1					
11	FW	(Northern Ireland)	Kyle Lafferty	16	23	7	20	7					1		2	
12	DF	(Scotland)	Lee Wallace	32	34	2	28	2	2		2				2	
14	FW	(Scotland)	Steven Naismith	14	15	9	11	9	2				1		1	
15	FW	(Northern Ireland)	David Healy	9	15	4	11	3			2	1	1		1	
16	DF	(Scotland)	Steven Whittaker	27	28	2	25	2	2				1			
17	MF	(Spain)	Juan Manuel Ortiz	8	14	1	10		2						2	1
18	DF	(United States)	Carlos Bocanegra	34	34	3	29	2			2		1		2	1
19	MF	(Nigeria)	Sone Aluko	21	23	12	21	12			2					
20	MF	(Australia)	Matt McKay	2	3		3									
21	MF	(United States)	Alejandro Bedoya	6	13	1	12	1					1			
22	DF	(England)	Kyle Bartley	20	21		19				2					
23	DF	(Scotland)	Jordan McMillan	1	3		2				1					
24	DF	(Algeria)	Madjid Bougherra	4	4		2		2							
24	MF	(Sweden)	Mervan Çelik	1	6		5				1					
25	GK	(Scotland)	Neil Alexander	2	2		1						1			
26	MF	(Scotland)	Jamie Ness	3	5	1	5	1								
27	MF	(Scotland)	Gregg Wylde	15	25	2	21	2			2		1		1	
28	MF	(Algeria)	Salim Kerkar	5	17	2	15	1			2	1				
32	DF	(Scotland)	Ross Perry	8	13		12								1	
33	MF	(Norway)	Thomas Kind Bendiksen	1	3		3									
34	FW	(Northern Ireland)	Andrew Little	6	11	5	10	5			1					
38	FW	(England)	Kane Hemmings		5		4		1							
40	MF	(Northern Ireland)	Andrew Mitchell	1	2		2									
41	MF	(Scotland)	Rhys McCabe	8	9		9									
69	FW	(Scotland)	Barrie McKay		1		1									

Last updated: 13 May 2012
Source: Soccerbase – Rangers 2011/2012 player appearances
Ordered by squad numbers
0 shown as blank

=== Top scorers ===
N	P	Nat.	Name	League	Scottish Cup	League Cup	Champions League	Europa League	Total
9	FW	(Croatia)	Nikica Jelavić	14	1	1	1		17
19	MF	(Nigeria)	Sone Aluko	12					12
14	FW	(Scotland)	Steven Naismith	9					9
11	FW	(Northern Ireland)	Kyle Lafferty	7					7
8	MF	(Northern Ireland)	Steven Davis	5					5
6	MF	(Scotland)	Lee McCulloch	5					5
34	FW	(Northern Ireland)	Andrew Little	5					5
15	FW	(Northern Ireland)	David Healy	3	1				4
18	DF	(United States)	Carlos Bocanegra	2				1	3
7	MF	(United States)	Maurice Edu	3					3
27	MF	(Scotland)	Gregg Wylde	2					2
28	MF	(France)	Salim Kerkar	1	1				2
12	DF	(Scotland)	Lee Wallace	2					2
16	DF	(Scotland)	Steven Whittaker	2					2
17	MF	(Spain)	Juan Manuel Ortiz					1	1
2	DF	(Romania)	Dorin Goian			1			1
26	MF	(Scotland)	Jamie Ness	1					1
21	MF	(United States)	Alejandro Bedoya	1					1
			Own goal	3	1				4

Last updated: 13 May 2012
Source: Match reports
Only competitive matches

=== Disciplinary record ===
N	P	Nat.	Name	YC	Yellow card Red card	RC
2	DF	(Romania)	Dorin Goian	10	1	
4	DF	(Scotland)	Kirk Broadfoot	3		
5	DF	(Bosnia and Herzegovina)	Saša Papac	4		1
6	MF	(Scotland)	Lee McCulloch	6		1
7	MF	(United States)	Maurice Edu	9	1	
8	MF	(Northern Ireland)	Steven Davis	5		
9	FW	(Croatia)	Nikica Jelavić	2		
11	FW	(Northern Ireland)	Kyle Lafferty	7		
12	DF	(Scotland)	Lee Wallace	2		
14	FW	(Scotland)	Steven Naismith	3		
15	FW	(Northern Ireland)	David Healy	2		
16	DF	(Scotland)	Steven Whittaker	4		1
17	MF	(Spain)	Juan Manuel Ortiz	2		
18	DF	(United States)	Carlos Bocanegra	8		1
19	MF	(Nigeria)	Sone Aluko	2		
21	MF	(United States)	Alejandro Bedoya	1		
22	DF	(England)	Kyle Bartley	6		
23	DF	(Scotland)	Jordan McMillan	2		
24	DF	(Algeria)	Madjid Bougherra			1
26	MF	(Scotland)	Jamie Ness	1		
27	MF	(Scotland)	Gregg Wylde			1
28	MF	(Algeria)	Salim Kerkar	2		
32	DF	(Scotland)	Ross Perry	1		
40	MF	(Northern Ireland)	Andrew Mitchell	2		
41	MF	(Scotland)	Rhys McCabe	2		

Last updated: 13 May 2012
Source: Match reports
Only competitive matches

== Club ==
=== Board of directors ===
Position	Staff
Chairman	(Scotland) Alastair Johnston (until 23 May) (Scotland) Craig Whyte (from 24 May)
Chief executive	(Scotland) Martin Bain (until 20 June)
Chief operations officer	(Scotland) Ali Russell (from 18 June) (until 29 February)
Director of Football	(Scotland) Gordon Smith (from 18 June) (until 29 February)
Director of Finance	(Scotland) Donald McIntyre (until 10 October)
Non-executive director	(Scotland) John Greig (until 17 October)
Non-executive director	(Scotland) John McClelland (until 17 October)
Non-executive director	(Scotland) Dave King
Non-executive director	(Scotland) Paul Murray (until 23 May)
Non-executive director	(England) Phil Betts (until 20 January)
Non-executive director	(England) Andrew Ellis (from 20 January)

Source: Rangers.co.uk

=== Coaching staff ===
Position	Staff
Manager	(Scotland) Ally McCoist
Assistant manager	(Scotland) Kenny McDowall
First-team coach	(Scotland) Ian Durrant
Head of Sports; Science	(Wales) Adam Owen
Goalkeepers coach	(Scotland) Jim Stewart

Source: Rangers.co.uk

=== Other staff ===
Position	Staff
Head of Football; Administration	(Scotland) Andrew Dickson
Director of Global; Partnerships	(Ukraine) Misha Sher (from 17 January) (until 9 March)
Company secretary	(England) Gary Withey (from 26 May)
Physiotherapist	(Scotland) Philip Yeates
Doctor	(Scotland) Dr Paul Jackson
Chief scout	(Scotland) Neil Murray
First-team scout	(Scotland) John Brown
Masseur	(Scotland) Davie Lavery
Kit controller	(Scotland) Jimmy Bell
Video analyst	(Scotland) Steve Harvey
Administrator	(England) David Whitehouse (England) Paul Clark (from 14 February) from Duff & Phelps

Source: Rangers.co.uk

== Matches ==
=== Scottish Premier League ===
Game	Date	Tournament	Round	Ground	Opponent	Score^{1}	Report
1	23 July 2011	Scottish Premier League	1	H	Heart of Midlothian	1–1	Report / Report link; Kick off / 12:30 BST; Attendance / 49,083; Referee / Calum Murray; Rangers / Heart of Midlothian; 58' Naismith / 16' Obua
3	30 July 2011	Scottish Premier League	2	A	St Johnstone	2–0	Report / Report link; Kick off / 12:00 BST; Attendance / 6,459; Referee / Alan Muir; St Johnstone / Rangers; / 31' Naismith; 50' Jelavić
5	13 August 2011	Scottish Premier League	4	A	Inverness Caledonian Thistle	2–0	Report / Report link; Kick off / 12:45 BST; Attendance / 6,623; Referee / Euan Norris; Inverness Caledonian Thistle / Rangers; (red card) 59' Tokely / 60' (pen.) Jelavić; 68' Edu; (yellow card) 75' (red card) Edu
7	21 August 2011	Scottish Premier League	5	A	Motherwell	3–0	Report / Report link; Kick off / 14:15 BST; Attendance / 10,092; Referee / Craig Thomson; Motherwell / Rangers; / 20' Naismith; 45+1' Lafferty; 85' Wylde
9	28 August 2011	Scottish Premier League	6	H	Aberdeen	2–0	Report / Report link; Kick off / 15:00 BST; Attendance / 44,070; Referee / Iain Brines; Rangers / Aberdeen; 15' Davis; 90+2' Naismith
10	10 September 2011	Scottish Premier League	7	A	Dundee United	1–0	Report / Report link; Kick off / 12:30 BST; Attendance / 10,156; Referee / Calum Murray; Dundee United / Rangers; (red card) 30' Russell / 61' Lafferty
11	17 September 2011	Scottish Premier League	8	H	Celtic	4–2	Report / Report link; Kick off / 12:30 BST; Attendance / 50,221; Referee / Craig Thomson; Rangers / Celtic; 23' Naismith; 55' Jelavić; 67' Lafferty; 90+3' Naismith / 34' Hooper; 41' El Kaddouri; (yellow card) 75' (red card) Mulgrew
13	24 September 2011	Scottish Premier League	9	A	Dunfermline Athletic	4–0	Report / Report link; Kick off / 12:45 BST; Attendance / 7,577; Referee / Iain Brines; Dunfermline Athletic / Rangers; / 9' Bocanegra; 17' Edu; 51' Naismith; 81' Naismith
14	27 September 2011	Scottish Premier League	3	H	Kilmarnock	2–0	Report / Report link; Kick off / 19:45 BST; Attendance / 43,761; Referee / William Collum; Rangers / Kilmarnock; 64' Jelavić; 66' Wylde
15	1 October 2011	Scottish Premier League	10	H	Hibernian	1–0	Report / Report link; Kick off / 15:00 BST; Attendance / 44,430; Referee / Stevie O'Reilly; Rangers / Hibernian; 68' Lafferty
16	15 October 2011	Scottish Premier League	11	H	St Mirren	1–1	Report / Report link; Kick off / 15:00 BST; Attendance / 47,034; Referee / Crawford Allan; Rangers / St Mirren; 48' Jelavić / 90+5' Thompson
17	23 October 2011	Scottish Premier League	12	A	Heart of Midlothian	2–0	Report / Report link; Kick off / 12:30 BST; Attendance / 15,495; Referee / Calum Murray; Heart of Midlothian / Rangers; / 21' Naismith; 74' Jelavić
18	29 October 2011	Scottish Premier League	13	A	Aberdeen	2–1	Report / Report link; Kick off / 12:00 BST; Attendance / 15,468; Referee / William Collum; Aberdeen / Rangers; 82' Foster / 58' Lafferty; 70' (pen.) Jelavić
19	5 November 2011	Scottish Premier League	14	H	Dundee United	3–1	Report / Report link; Kick off / 15:00 GMT; Attendance / 45,600; Referee / Brian Winter; Rangers / Dundee United; 19' Jelavić; 63' (pen.) Jelavić; 82' (o.g.) Kenneth; (red card) 90+1' Wylde / 73' Daly
20	19 November 2011	Scottish Premier League	15	H	St Johnstone	0–0	Report / Report link; Kick off / 15:00 GMT; Attendance / 45,279; Referee / Euan Norris
21	27 November 2011	Scottish Premier League	16	A	Kilmarnock	0–1	Report / Report link; Kick off / 12:45 GMT; Attendance / 9,506; Referee / Alan Muir; Kilmarnock / Rangers; 80' Pascali
22	3 December 2011	Scottish Premier League	17	H	Dunfermline Athletic	2–1	Report / Report link; Kick off / 15:00 GMT; Attendance / 47,305; Referee / Steve Conroy; Rangers / Dunfermline Athletic; 22' (o.g.) Keddie; 29' (pen.) Jelavić / 31' Cardle
23	10 December 2011	Scottish Premier League	18	A	Hibernian	2–0	Report / Report link; Kick off / 12:30 GMT; Attendance / 11,380; Referee / Iain Brines; Hibernian / Rangers; / 61' (pen.) Jelavić; 69' Jelavić
24	17 December 2011	Scottish Premier League	19	H	Inverness Caledonian Thistle	2–1	Report / Report link; Kick off / 15:00 GMT; Attendance / 43,701; Referee / Bobby Madden; Rangers / Inverness Caledonian Thistle; 55' Bocanegra; 83' Lafferty / 67' Shinnie
25	24 December 2011	Scottish Premier League	20	A	St Mirren	1–2	Report / Report link; Kick off / 12:45 GMT; Attendance / 6,711; Referee / Steven McLean; St Mirren / Rangers; 44' Mooy; 45+2' McGowan / 11' Wallace; (red card) 24' McCulloch; (yellow card) 87' (red card) Goian
26	28 December 2011	Scottish Premier League	21	A	Celtic	0–1	Report / Report link; Kick off / 19:45 GMT; Attendance / 58,658; Referee / William Collum; Celtic / Rangers; 52' Ledley
27	2 January 2012	Scottish Premier League	22	H	Motherwell	3–0	Report / Report link; Kick off / 15:00 GMT; Attendance / 44,893; Referee / Euan Norris; Rangers / Motherwell; 35' Healy; 55' Aluko; 73' (o.g.) Craigan
29	14 January 2012	Scottish Premier League	23	A	St Johnstone	2–1	Report / Report link; Kick off / 12:30 GMT; Attendance / 6,577; Referee / Craig Thomson; St Johnstone / Rangers; 68' (o.g.) Bocanegra / 24' Jelavić; 81' Jelavić
30	21 January 2012	Scottish Premier League	24	H	Aberdeen	1–1	Report / Report link; Kick off / 15:00 GMT; Attendance / 46,648; Referee / Iain Brines; Rangers / Aberdeen; 67' Edu / 63' Árnason
31	28 January 2012	Scottish Premier League	25	H	Hibernian	4–0	Report / Report link; Kick off / 15:00 GMT; Attendance / 44,057; Referee / Charlie Richmond; Rangers / Hibernian; 27' Davis; 55' Healy; 72' Aluko; 90+3' Davis
33	11 February 2012	Scottish Premier League	26	A	Dunfermline Athletic	4–1	Report / Report link; Kick off / 12:00 GMT; Attendance / 7,464; Referee / Brian Winter; Dunfermline Athletic / Rangers; 16' Kirk / 24' Healy; 39' McCulloch; 71' Aluko; 85' Kerkar
34	18 February 2012	Scottish Premier League	27	H	Kilmarnock	0–1	Report / Report link; Kick off / 15:00 GMT; Attendance / 50,268; Referee / Iain Brines; Rangers / Kilmarnock; (red card) 43' Papac / 12' Shiels
35	26 February 2012	Scottish Premier League	28	A	Inverness Caledonian Thistle	4–1	Report / Report link; Kick off / 12:45 GMT; Attendance / 6,416; Referee / William Collum; Inverness Caledonian Thistle / Rangers; 40' Williams / 6' Davis; 16' Aluko; 36' Little; 72' McCulloch
36	3 March 2012	Scottish Premier League	29	H	Heart of Midlothian	1–2	Report / Report link; Kick off / 15:00 GMT; Attendance / 47,276; Referee / Crawford Allan; Rangers / Heart of Midlothian; 45' Davis / 58' Black; 79' Hamill
37	17 March 2012	Scottish Premier League	30	A	Dundee United	1–2	Report / Report link; Kick off / 12:45 GMT; Attendance / 9,464; Referee / Brian Winter; Dundee United / Rangers; 37' Watson; 47' Daly / 60' Aluko
38	24 March 2012	Scottish Premier League	31	H	Celtic	3–2	Report / Report link; Kick off / 13:00 BST; Attendance / 50,191; Referee / Calum Murray; Rangers / Celtic; 11' Aluko; 72' Little; 77' Wallace; (red card) 88' Bocanegra / (red card) 29' Cha; (red card) 57' Wanyama; 89' (pen.) Brown; 90+2' Rogne
39	31 March 2012	Scottish Premier League	32	A	Motherwell	2–1	Report / Report link; Kick off / 12:00 BST; Attendance / 9,063; Referee / Iain Brines; Motherwell / Rangers; 6' Ojamaa / 9' Whittaker; 89' McCulloch
40	7 April 2012	Scottish Premier League	33	H	St Mirren	3–1	Report / Report link; Kick off / 15:00 BST; Attendance / 46,998; Referee / William Collum; Rangers / St Mirren; 1' McCulloch; 40' Little; 60' (pen.) Lafferty / 49' (pen.) McGowan; (red card) 51' Tesselaar
41	21 April 2012	Scottish Premier League	34	A	Heart of Midlothian	3–0	Report / Report link; Kick off / 15:00 BST; Attendance / 14,842; Referee / Calum Murray; Heart of Midlothian / Rangers; / 29' Aluko; 35' Little; 88' Little
42	29 April 2012	Scottish Premier League	35	A	Celtic	0–3	Report / Report link; Kick off / 12:00 BST; Attendance / 58,546; Referee / Calum Murray; Celtic / Rangers; 17' Mulgrew; 31' Commons; 54' Hooper
43	2 May 2012	Scottish Premier League	36	H	Dundee United	5–0	Report / Report link; Kick off / 19:45 BST; Attendance / 43,383; Referee / Alan Muir; Rangers / Dundee United; 6' Whittaker; 17' Aluko; 20' Aluko; 57' Ness; 84' Bedoya
44	5 May 2012	Scottish Premier League	37	H	Motherwell	0–0	Report / Report link; Kick off / 12:45 BST; Attendance / 45,962; Referee / William Collum
45	13 May 2012	Scottish Premier League	38	A	St Johnstone	4–0	Report / Report link; Kick off / 12:30 BST; Attendance / 6,459; Referee / Bobby Madden; St Johnstone / Rangers; / 23' McCulloch; 56' Aluko; 62' Aluko; 73' Aluko

Last updated: 13 May 2012
Source: Wikipedia article
^{1}Rangers goals come first.
National flags for Ground and Opponent columns are only shown when different from that of Rangers.
M = Match; Ground: H = Home, A = Away, N = Neutral, HR = Home replacement, AR = Away replacement.

=== UEFA Champions League ===
Game

Date

Tournament

Round

Ground

Opponent

Score^{1}

Report

2
26 July 2011
UEFA Champions League
QR3
H
Malmö FF (Sweden)
0–1

Report	Report link
Kick off	19:45 BST
Attendance	28,828
Referee	Antonio Miguel Mateu Lahoz
Rangers	Malmö FF
	18' Larsson

4
3 August 2011
UEFA Champions League
QR3
A (Sweden)
Malmö FF (Sweden)
1–1

Report	Report link
Kick off	18:00 BST
Attendance	19,084
Referee	Vladislav Bezborodov
Malmö FF	Rangers
(yellow card) 73' (red card) Ricardinho; 80' Hamad	(red card) 18' Whittaker; 23' Jelavić; (red card) 66' Bougherra

Last updated: 3 August 2011
Source: Wikipedia article
^{1}Rangers goals come first.
National flags for Ground and Opponent columns are only shown when different from that of Rangers.
M = Match; Ground: H = Home, A = Away, N = Neutral, HR = Home replacement, AR = Away replacement.

=== UEFA Europa League ===
Game

Date

Tournament

Round

Ground

Opponent

Score^{1}

Report

6
18 August 2011
UEFA Europa League
POR
A (Slovenia)
Maribor (Slovenia)
1–2

Report	Report link
Kick off	19:45 BST
Attendance	11,000
Referee	Manuel Gräfe
Maribor	Rangers
52' Ibraimi; 90+1' Velikonja	31' Ortiz

8
25 August 2011
UEFA Europa League
POR
H
Maribor (Slovenia)
1–1

Report	Report link
Kick off	19:30 BST
Attendance	32,223
Referee	Aleksandar Stavrev
Rangers	Maribor
75' Bocanegra	55' Volaš

Last updated: 25 August 2011
Source: Wikipedia article
^{1}Rangers goals come first.
National flags for Ground and Opponent columns are only shown when different from that of Rangers.
M = Match; Ground: H = Home, A = Away, N = Neutral, HR = Home replacement, AR = Away replacement.

=== Scottish Cup ===
Game

Date

Tournament

Round

Ground

Opponent

Score^{1}

Report

28
8 January 2012
Scottish Cup
R4
A
Arbroath
4–0

Report	Report link
Kick off	12:45 GMT
Attendance	5,895
Referee	Calum Murray
Arbroath	Rangers
	Healy 17'; Wedderburn 22' (o.g.); Jelavić 59'; Kerkar 77'

32
5 February 2012
Scottish Cup
R5
H
Dundee United
0–2

Report	Report link
Kick off	12:15 GMT
Attendance	17,822
Referee	William Collum
Rangers	Dundee United
	Gunning 16'; Russell 35'

Last updated: 5 February 2012
Source: Wikipedia article
^{1}Rangers goals come first.
National flags for Ground and Opponent columns are only shown when different from that of Rangers.
M = Match; Ground: H = Home, A = Away, N = Neutral, HR = Home replacement, AR = Away replacement.

=== League Cup ===
Game

12
Date

21 September 2011
Tournament

League Cup
Round

R3
Ground

A
Opponent

Falkirk
Score^{1}

2–3
Report

Report	Report link
Kick off	19:45 BST
Attendance	6,493
Referee	Brian Winters
Falkirk	Rangers
58' El Alagui; 73' El Alagui; 90+3' Millar	83' Goian; 87' Jelavić

Last updated: 21 September 2011
Source: Wikipedia article
^{1}Rangers goals come first.
National flags for Ground and Opponent columns are only shown when different from that of Rangers.
M = Match; Ground: H = Home, A = Away, N = Neutral, HR = Home replacement, AR = Away replacement.

=== Friendlies ===
Game	Date	Tournament	Round	Ground	Opponent	Score^{1}	Report
1	7 July 2011	Friendly		A (Germany)	Sportfreunde Lotte (Germany)	0–1	Report / Report link; Kick off / 18:00 BST; Attendance / 1,100; Sportfreunde Lotte / Rangers; 52' Engelmann
2	9 July 2011	Friendly		A (Germany)	VfL Bochum (Germany)	0–3	Report / Report link; Kick off / 14:30 BST; Attendance / 5,400; Referee / Christian Fischer; VfL Bochum / Rangers; 63' Ginczek; 73' Aydın; 80' Yahia
3	13 July 2011	Friendly		N (Germany)	Bayer Leverkusen (Germany)	0–2	Report / Report link; Kick off / 17:30 BST; Attendance / 4,050; Bayer Leverkusen / Rangers; 13' Barnetta; 80' (pen.) Ballack
4	16 July 2011	Friendly		A (Northern Ireland)	Linfield (Northern Ireland)	4–1	Report / Report link; Kick off / 14:00 BST; Attendance / 8,500; Referee / Trevor Moutray; Linfield / Rangers; 29' Carvill / 20' Ortiz; 67' Naismith; 78' Jelavić; 84' Hemmings
5	19 July 2011	Friendly		A (England)	Blackpool (England)	2–0	Report / Report link; Kick off / 19:30 BST; Attendance / 7,000; Referee / Neil Swarbrick; Blackpool / Rangers; / 35' Davis; 43' Davis
6	6 August 2011	Friendly		H	Chelsea (England)	1–3	Report / Report link; Kick off / 15:00 BST; Attendance / 47,379; Referee / Craig Thomson; Rangers / Chelsea; 7' Jelavić / 22' Sturridge; 30' Sturridge; 72' Malouda
7	18 October 2011	Friendly		H	Liverpool (England)	1–0	Report / Report link; Kick off / 19:30 BST; Attendance / 27,453; Referee / William Collum; Rangers / Liverpool; 20' McCulloch
8	29 November 2011	Friendly		A (Germany)	Hamburger SV (Germany)	1–2	Report / Report link; Kick off / 18:15 GMT; Attendance / 12,117; Hamburger SV / Rangers; 38' Iličević; 81' Son / 71' Bendiksen
9	7 May 2012	Friendly		A (Northern Ireland)	Linfield (Northern Ireland)	2–0	Report / Report link; Kick off / 15:00 BST; Attendance / 7,000; Referee / Colin Burns; Linfield / Rangers; / 54' Bedoya; 78' McKay

Last updated: 29 November 2011
Source: Wikipedia article
^{1}Rangers goals come first.
National flags for Ground and Opponent columns are only shown when different from that of Rangers.
M = Match; Ground: H = Home, A = Away, N = Neutral, HR = Home replacement, AR = Away replacement.

== Competitions ==
=== Overall ===
Competition	Started round	Current position / round	Final position / round	First match	Last match
Scottish Premier League	—	—	2nd	23 July	13 May
UEFA Champions League	Third qualifying round	—	Third qualifying round	26 July	3 August
UEFA Europa League	Play-off round	—	Play-off round	18 August	25 August
League Cup	3rd Round	—	3rd Round	21 September	
Scottish Cup	4th Round	—	5th Round	8 January	5 February

Source: Competitions

=== Scottish Premier League ===
==== Standings ====
Pos	Team	Pld	W	D	L	GF	GA	GD	Pts	Qualification or relegation
1	Celtic (C)	38	30	3	5	84	21	+63	93	Qualification for the Champions League third qualifying round
2	Rangers (D, R)	38	26	5	7	77	28	+49	73	Refused SPL admission, accepted into the Third Division and disqualified from the Champions League third qualifying round (Note: Rangers were deducted 10 points for entering administration. As Rangers did not exit administration by 31 March, they were ineligible to compete in Europe in the 2012–13 season. Rangers were unable to agree a CVA with their creditors and the company entered proceedings to be liquidated. After a new company took over, Rangers were denied continued SPL membership and ended up in the 2012–13 Scottish Third Division in time for the start of the season.)
3	Motherwell	38	18	8	12	49	44	+5	62	Qualification for the Champions League third qualifying round
4	Dundee United	38	16	11	11	62	50	+12	59	Qualification for the Europa League third qualifying round
5	Heart of Midlothian	38	15	7	16	45	43	+2	52	Qualification for the Europa League play-off round (Note: Hearts qualified for the Europa League as 2011–12 Scottish Cup winners. Since they finished fifth in the league, the sixth-placed team, St Johnstone, also qualified for the Europa League.)

Source: SPFL Archive
Rules for classification: 1) points; 2) goal difference; 3) number of goals scored.
(C) Champions; (D) Disqualified; (R) Relegated

==== Results summary ====
Overall								Home						Away					
Pld	W	D	L	GF	GA	GD	Pts	W	D	L	GF	GA	GD	W	D	L	GF	GA	GD
38	26	5	7	77	28	+49	73^{†}	12	5	2	38	14	+24	14	0	5	39	14	+25

Last updated: 13 May 2012.
Source: Wikipedia article

==== Results by round ====
Round	1	2	3	4	5	6	7	8	9	10	11	12	13	14	15	16	17	18	19	20	21	22	23	24	25	26	27	28	29	30	31	32	33	34	35	36	37	38
Ground	H	A	H	A	A	H	A	H	A	H	H	A	A	H	H	A	H	H	H	A	A	H	A	H	H	A	H	A	H	A	H	A	H	A	A	H	H	A
Result	D	W	W	W	W	W	W	W	W	W	D	W	W	W	D	L	W	W	W	L	L	W	W	D	W	W	L	W	L	L	W	W	W	W	L	W	D	W

Updated to match(es) played on 13 May 2012. Source: 2011–12 Scottish Premier League
A = Away; H = Home; W = Win; D = Draw; L = Loss
