= Ross Perry =

Scottish footballer

Personal information
- Date of birth: 7 February 1990 (age 36)
- Place of birth: Falkirk, Scotland
- Position: Centre back

Team information
- Current team: Darvel

Senior career*
| Years | Team | Apps | (Gls) |
| 2006–2014 | Rangers | 29 | (0) |
| 2009–2010 | → Oxford United (loan) | 8 | (0) |
| 2011 | → Falkirk (loan) | 12 | (0) |
| 2014–2015 | Raith Rovers | 11 | (0) |
| 2015 | Northampton Town | 0 | (0) |
| 2015–2016 | Brechin City | 8 | (0) |
| 2016–2017 | Clyde | 21 | (0) |
| 2017–2018 | Albion Rovers | 29 | (1) |
| 2018–2019 | Dumbarton | 11 | (1) |
| 2019– | Darvel | | |

International career
| 2008–2009 | Scotland U19 | 6 | (1) |
| 2009–2012 | Scotland U21 | 16 | (0) |
- * Club domestic league appearances and goals as of 18:28, 6 June 2019 (UTC)

Ross Perry (born 7 February 1990) is a Scottish footballer who plays as a centre back for Darvel.

He has previously played for Rangers, Oxford United, Falkirk, Raith Rovers, Northampton Town, Brechin City, Clyde, Albion Rovers and Dumbarton.

== Career ==
Perry's first appearance for Rangers came in a post-season friendly match against Los Angeles Galaxy at the Home Depot Center, coming on as a substitute for David Weir. This made him the first player born in the 1990s to play for the Rangers first team. Perry signed a two-year contract extension in October 2007.

On 28 August 2009, he joined Oxford United on a season-long loan. On 11 February 2011, he joined Falkirk in another loan spell, until the end of the 2010–11 season.

Perry made his professional Rangers debut in the Scottish Premier League on 13 August 2011, replacing Kyle Bartley in a match against Inverness Caledonian Thistle. A week later, Perry was given his first start for Rangers, and played the full 90 minutes, helping keep a clean sheet in a 3–0 win away to Motherwell.

On 9 September 2011, Perry signed a new four-year contract with Rangers. Rangers entered administration in 2012 and were unable to agree a deal with its creditors. Perry agreed to transfer his contract.

Perry suffered ankle ligament damage during a pre-season friendly which meant that he did not play at all during the 2013–14 season. His contract with Rangers was cancelled by mutual consent in June 2014. In July 2014 Perry signed for Raith Rovers on a short-term deal. He left when this expired in early January 2015. He signed a short-term contract with Northampton Town in March 2015, however left the club in May 2015 without making any appearances. Perry then signed for Scottish League One side Brechin City in July 2015. He subsequently signed for Clyde in 2016, where he spent one season before being released in May 2017. He signed for Albion Rovers in July 2017, after a year at the club he signed for Dumbarton. Following an injury hit season with the Sons, Perry was released in May 2019 and signed for SJFA West Region Championship side Darvel.

== Career statistics ==
As of 18:28, 23 February 2019 (UTC)

Appearances and goals by club, season and competition
| Club | Season | League | | | National Cup | | League Cup | | Other | | Total | |
| Club | Season | Division | Apps | Goals | Apps | Goals | Apps | Goals | Apps | Goals | Apps | Goals |
|---|---|---|---|---|---|---|---|---|---|---|---|---|
| Rangers | 2009–10 | Scottish Premiership | 0 | 0 | 0 | 0 | 0 | 0 | 0 | 0 | 0 | 0 |
| Rangers | 2010–11 | Scottish Premiership | 0 | 0 | 0 | 0 | 0 | 0 | 0 | 0 | 0 | 0 |
| Rangers | 2011–12 | Scottish Premiership | 12 | 0 | 0 | 0 | 0 | 0 | 1 | 0 | 13 | 0 |
| Rangers | 2012–13 | Scottish Third Division | 17 | 0 | 1 | 0 | 2 | 0 | 0 | 0 | 20 | 0 |
| Rangers | 2013–14 | Scottish League One | 0 | 0 | 0 | 0 | 0 | 0 | 0 | 0 | 0 | 0 |
| Rangers | Total | | 29 | 0 | 1 | 0 | 2 | 0 | 1 | 0 | 33 | 0 |
| Oxford United (loan) | 2009–10 | Conference Premier | 8 | 0 | 3 | 0 | 0 | 0 | 0 | 0 | 11 | 0 |
| Falkirk (loan) | 2010–11 | Scottish First Division | 12 | 0 | 0 | 0 | 0 | 0 | 0 | 0 | 12 | 0 |
| Raith Rovers | 2014–15 | Scottish Championship | 11 | 0 | 2 | 0 | 2 | 0 | 1 | 0 | 16 | 0 |
| Northampton Town | 2014–15 | Football League Two | 0 | 0 | 0 | 0 | 0 | 0 | 0 | 0 | 0 | 0 |
| Brechin City | 2015–16 | Scottish League One | 8 | 0 | 1 | 0 | 1 | 0 | 0 | 0 | 10 | 0 |
| Clyde | 2016–17 | Scottish League Two | 21 | 0 | 5 | 0 | 0 | 0 | 0 | 0 | 26 | 0 |
| Albion Rovers | 2017–18 | Scottish League One | 29 | 1 | 1 | 0 | 4 | 0 | 1 | 0 | 35 | 1 |
| Dumbarton | 2018–19 | Scottish League One | 11 | 1 | 1 | 0 | 4 | 0 | 1 | 0 | 17 | 1 |
| Career Total | | | 129 | 2 | 14 | 0 | 13 | 0 | 4 | 0 | 160 | 2 |

== Honours ==
Rangers

- Scottish Third Division (1): 2012–13
