= Robbie Mutch =

Scottish footballer

Personal information
- Date of birth: 20 August 1998 (age 28)
- Place of birth: Elgin, Scotland
- Height: 1.94 m (6 ft 4 in)
- Position: Goalkeeper

Team information
- Current team: Cove Rangers
- Number: 1

Youth career
- 2006–2014: Aberdeen

Senior career*
Years	Team	Apps	(Gls)
2014–2017	Aberdeen	0	(0)
2016–2017	→ Arbroath (loan)	14	(0)
2017–2022	Falkirk	79	(0)
2018	→ Dumbarton (loan)	2	(0)
2019	→ Deveronvale (loan)	9	(0)
2022–2023	Edinburgh City	36	(0)
2023–2025	Ayr United	13	(0)
2024–2025	→ Stranraer (loan)	7	(0)
2025–	Cove Rangers	47	(0)
- * Club domestic league appearances and goals as of 4 May 2026

Robbie Mutch (born 20 August 1998) is a Scottish footballer who plays as a goalkeeper for Scottish League One side Cove Rangers.

== Career ==
Mutch came through Aberdeen's youth system, and joined Scottish League Two side Arbroath on loan in June 2016. After leaving the Dons he joined Scottish Championship side Falkirk in the summer of 2017. He won the club's Young Player of the Year Award in his first season, and signed a new three-year deal in May 2018. Mutch joined Scottish League One side Dumbarton on a short-term loan as cover for the injured Grant Adam in October 2018. He returned to Falkirk a fortnight later to cover for the suspended Leo Fasan. In January 2019, Mutch joined Scottish Highland Football League side Deveronvale on loan for the remainder of the 2018/19 campaign following an injury to Vale's regular goalkeeper Grant Pennet. Mutch returned to Falkirk in pre season of the 2019/20 season and started the season as back-up to Cammy Bell. During the season he took the number one spot at Falkirk and, in January 2020 despite interest from English Premier League side Southampton he signed a contract extension taking it up to the summer of 2022.

Mutch left Falkirk after the 2021–22 season ended, and then signed for Edinburgh in July 2022.

After one season with Edinburgh, Mutch signed for Championship club Ayr United in June 2023.

On 30 September 2024, Mutch joined Stranraer on loan until January 2025.

== Career statistics ==
As of match played 4 March 2025

Appearances and goals by club, season and competition
Club	Season	League			Scottish Cup		Scottish League Cup		Other		Total	
Club	Season	Division	Apps	Goals	Apps	Goals	Apps	Goals	Apps	Goals	Apps	Goals
Aberdeen	2014-15	Scottish Premiership	0	0	0	0	0	0	0	0	0	0
Aberdeen	2015-16	Scottish Premiership	0	0	0	0	0	0	0	0	0	0
Aberdeen	2016-17	Scottish Premiership	0	0	0	0	0	0	0	0	0	0
Aberdeen	Total		0	0	0	0	0	0	0	0	0	0
Arbroath (loan)	2016-17	Scottish League Two	8	0	0	0	4	0	2 (Note: Appearance(s) in Scottish Challenge Cup)	0	14	0
Falkirk	2017-18	Scottish Championship	5	0	0	0	0	0	0	0	5	0
Falkirk	2018-19	Scottish Championship	0	0	0	0	1	0	1	0	2	0
Falkirk	2019-20	Scottish League One	18	0	4	0	2	0	2	0	26	0
Falkirk	2020-21	Scottish League One	17	0	2	0	2	0	0	0	21	0
Falkirk	2021-22	Scottish League One	23	0	0	0	2	0	0	0	25	0
Falkirk	Total		63	0	6	0	7	0	3	0	79	0
Dumbarton (loan)	2018-19	Scottish League One	2	0	0	0	0	0	0	0	2	0
Deveronvale (loan)	2018–19	Highland Football League	—		—		—		—		—	
Edinburgh City	2022-23	Scottish League One	35	0	1	0	0	0	0	0	36	0
Ayr United	2023-24	Scottish Championship	7	0	1	0	3	0	1	0	12	0
Ayr United	2024-25	Scottish Championship	1	0	0	0	0	0	0	0	1	0
Ayr United	Total		8	0	1	0	3	0	1	0	13	0
Stranraer (loan)	2024-25	Scottish League Two	7	0	0	0	0	0	0	0	7	0
Career total			123	0	8	0	14	0	6	0	151	0
