= 2003 in Scottish television =

This is a list of events in Scottish television from 2003.

== Events ==
- 6 January – Scottish and Grampian adopt the celebrity idents package, albeit with their own logos attached and with idents featuring a lot more Scottish personalities alongside those of ITV1.
- 27 April – Scottish soap High Road ends after 23 years and over 1,700 episodes. The series airs in some English regions until 2004.
- 1 May – Television coverage of the 2003 Scottish Parliament general election.
- 17 December – BBC Scotland will not pursue the idea of a Scottish Six news programme, following a major review of output which indicated that a majority of viewers are satisfied with the status quo.

== Debuts ==
=== BBC ===
- 29 October – Blue Heaven (2003)
- Unknown – The Karen Dunbar Show

== Television series ==
- Scotsport (1957–2008)
- Reporting Scotland (1968–1983; 1984–present)
- Scotland Today (1972–2009)
- Sportscene (1975–present)
- The Beechgrove Garden (1978–present)
- Grampian Today (1980–2009)
- Taggart (1983–2010)
- Crossfire (1984–2004)
- Win, Lose or Draw (1990–2004)
- Only an Excuse? (1993–2020)
- Monarch of the Glen (2000–2005)
- Balamory (2002–2005)
- Jeopardy (2002–2004)
- Still Game (2002–2007; 2016–2019)
- River City (2002–2026)

== Ending this year ==
- 27 April – High Road (1980–2003)
- 3 December – Blue Heaven (2003)
- Unknown – Live Floor Show (2002–2003)

== Deaths ==
- 26 November – Gordon Reid, 64, actor

== See also ==
- 2003 in Scotland
