= Jordan McMillan =

Scottish footballer (born 1988)

Personal information
- Date of birth: 16 October 1988 (age 38)
- Place of birth: Glasgow, Scotland
- Position: Defender

Team information
- Current team: Pollok

Youth career
- –2007: Rangers

Senior career*
Years	Team	Apps	(Gls)
2007–2012	Rangers	2	(0)
2009	→ Hamilton Academical (loan)	4	(0)
2009	→ Queen of the South (loan)	16	(0)
2011	→ Wrexham (loan)	5	(0)
2012–2013	Dunfermline Athletic	38	(2)
2013–2015	Partick Thistle	30	(3)
2017	Clyde	11	(0)
2018–19	Cambuslang Rangers		
2019	Edusport		
2019–2020	Dumbarton	6	(0)
2019–2020	→ Pollok (loan)		
2020–	Pollok		
- * Club domestic league appearances and goals as of 18:30, 14 July 2020 (UTC)

Jordan McMillan (born 16 October 1988) is a Scottish footballer who plays as a defender for West of Scotland club Pollok.

McMillan's career began at Rangers where his career development was documented on the television documentary Blue Heaven. McMillan made two first team appearances for Rangers but failed to secure a regular starting place; the majority of his time at the club was spent on loan at Hamilton Academical, Queen of the South and Wrexham. McMillan left Rangers in 2013 to join fellow Scottish Premier League side Dunfermline Athletic. He was made redundant the following season after the club entered administration.

In March 2013, McMillan joined Scottish First Division side Partick Thistle and became part of their title-winning team. He was released from his contract in February 2015, following a failed drugs test, and was subsequently banned from all competitive sport for two years. McMillan returned to football in 2017, signing a short-term contract with Clyde, before spending time with Cambuslang Rangers, Edusport Academy, Dumbarton and Pollok.

== Career ==
=== Rangers ===
McMillan was born in Glasgow and began his career with hometown club Rangers. He featured on Blue Heaven, a BBC Scotland programme following the lives of young footballers at Rangers, and went on to captain Rangers reserve team. In 2005, McMillan signed his first professional contract at Rangers. During his Rangers career, he was an unused substitute on several occasions, including the 2008 Scottish Cup Final against Queen of the South, before making his senior debut against Dundee in a Scottish League Cup quarter-final tie on 27 October 2009, starting in a 3–1 away win.

McMillan signed a new two-year contract with Rangers in July 2010, having performed well on loan for Queen of the South during the previous season. He made his Champions League debut as an 82nd-minute substitute for Darren Cole on 7 December 2010 in a 1–1 draw away at Bursaspor.

After several appearances as an unused substitute, McMillan made his league debut for Rangers, after six years in the first-team squad, starting at right-back in a 3–0 win away to Motherwell, on 21 August 2011 In January 2012, McMillan rejected a new three-year deal at £2,000 a week to stay at Rangers, explaining his actions as not wanting "to come across as greedy", but stated he was happy to stay at Rangers on one condition: to play regularly in the first team.

==== Loan moves ====
On 7 January 2009, McMillan joined Hamilton Academical on loan until the end of the 2008–09 season. He made his first professional appearance in a 1–0 Scottish Cup victory over Ross County on 10 January 2009.

The following season McMillan joined Dumfries club Queen of the South on 1 December 2009. He made his Queens debut on the evening of the same day in the home game against Dunfermline Athletic. He made 16 appearances for Queens between then and the season's end, all in the league. On 1 February 2011, Wrexham recruited McMillan on loan for the rest of the season.

=== Dunfermline Athletic ===
On 31 January 2012, McMillan joined fellow Scottish Premier League club Dunfermline Athletic on a deal to May 2013. He made his debut on 7 February 2012, in a 1–1 draw with Kilmarnock, and scored his first goal for the club in a 4–4 draw against St Mirren on 21 April 2012. However, the club was relegated from the Scottish Premier League after losing 4–0 to Hibernian.

In the 2012–13 season, McMillan was appointed the new club captain ahead of a new season in the Scottish First Division. On 22 September 2012, McMillan scored his first goal of the season and his second goal of his Dunfermline career, in a 4–2 win over Livingston. In a 1–0 loss against Falkirk, on 26 December 2012, McMillan was sent-off, being given a straight red card for violent conduct when he appeared to grab Stewart Murdoch's throat. At the beginning of the season Dunfermline were expected to be chasing for the title, but later in the season, the club's season became marred with financial difficulties, which led to administration. In the wake of the club's financial difficulties, McMillan stated previous few months at the club had been "horrible" and he expressed his fears that some at the club could lose their jobs. On 27 March 2013, McMillan made his last appearance, in a 2–0 loss against Falkirk.

The club's fears came true on 28 March 2013, Dunfermline announced 11 players were to be made redundant after the club went into administration and this included McMillan, who announced it to his fans on social networking site Twitter. After being made redundant, Manager Jim Jefferies paid tribute to McMillan, saying: "He is a wee bit of a 'Jack the lad' but there is not an ounce of malice in him. He is a terrific boy and he handled things really well as my captain."

=== Partick Thistle ===
On 29 March 2013, McMillan joined Scottish First Division club Partick Thistle on a deal to May 2013. After the move, McMillan said that Partick Thistle saved his career after being released by Dunfermline Athletic. After Partick Thistle had clinched the First Division title and promotion to the Scottish Premier League, McMillan made his first start, scoring against his former club, Dunfermline Athletic, in a 3–3 draw. At the end of the season, McMillan, along with former Dunfermline teammate Callum Morris and four Partick Thistle teammates, was named in the PFA Scotland First Division Team of the Year

Ahead of the 2013–14 season, he signed a new two-year contract with the Jags on 17 June 2013, as they prepared for the Scottish Premiership season.

After having spent a period of time out for personal reasons, McMillan was suspended by the club for an unspecified reason in January 2015. An internal investigation was carried out by the club, and at the conclusion of this investigation in February 2015, McMillan's contract was terminated by Thistle. It was later discovered that McMillan had failed a UK Anti-Doping (UKAD) drugs test, following a 1–0 defeat to Celtic on 3 December 2014. Thistle later clarified that his exclusion from the team and later suspension had been due to the failed test.

As a result of the failed drugs test, McMillan was banned from competitive sport by the National Anti-Doping Panel for two years. McMillan had tested positive for the cocaine metabolite benzoylecgonine. The suspension was appealed by McMillan, who protested that he had consumed cocaine unwittingly having had his drink spiked at a party. The appeal panel upheld the original decision, with his suspension due to run until 17 December 2016. The chief executive of UKAD stressed the importance of "strict liability", meaning that athletes are responsible for all substances entering their bodies.

=== Post-ban ===
In July 2016, McMillan's ban from football was reduced by one month, which would allow him to return to football from November 2016. With the end of his ban approaching, McMillan was given use of his former side Dunfermline Athletic's training facilities in October 2016, in a bid to return to match fitness and find a new club. After suggestions that McMillan would join his former club on a permanent deal, Pars boss Allan Johnston stressed that McMillan's use of the club's training facilities would be "as far as it goes". With his ban expiring on 17 November, McMillan was subsequently given use of the training facilities of Scottish League One side Livingston, with a view to potentially signing for the club.

On 20 January 2017, McMillan returned to football, signing for Scottish League Two club Clyde on a short-term contract as an amateur. His contract was not renewed and he departed the club in June 2017.

McMillan signed for Scottish Junior Football Association, West Region side Cambuslang Rangers in September 2018. In October 2018, he participated at the Hamilton Open Trials of the newly formed Canadian Premier League; it is unknown whether he received a contract offer. On 4 February 2019, Edusport announced that McMillan had joined the club.

After his spell with Edusport, McMillan moved to Scottish League One side Dumbarton in July 2019. After making only a handful of appearances, McMillan joined Pollok on a short-term loan in December 2019. He left the Sons in January 2020. McMillan signed a permanent deal with Pollok after leaving Dumbarton.

== Career statistics ==
As of 22:28, 30 November 2019 (UTC)

Club statistics
Club	Season	League		Scottish Cup		League Cup		Europe		Other		Total	
Club	Season	App	Goals	App	Goals	App	Goals	App	Goals	App	Goals	App	Goals
Rangers	2007–08	0	0	0	0	0	0	0	0	0	0	0	0
Rangers	2008–09	0	0	0	0	0	0	0	0	0	0	0	0
Rangers	2009–10	0	0	0	0	1	0	0	0	0	0	1	0
Rangers	2010–11	0	0	0	0	0	0	1	0	0	0	1	0
Rangers	2011–12	2	0	1	0	0	0	0	0	0	0	3	0
Rangers	Total	2	0	1	0	1	0	1	0	0	0	5	0
Hamilton Academical (loan)	2008–09	4	0	1	0	0	0	0	0	0	0	5	0
Queen of The South (loan)	2009–10	16	0	0	0	0	0	0	0	0	0	16	0
Wrexham (loan)	2010–11	5	0	0	0	0	0	0	0	0	0	5	0
Dunfermline Athletic	2011–12	11	1	0	0	0	0	0	0	0	0	11	1
Dunfermline Athletic	2012–13	27	1	2	0	2	0	0	0	1	0	32	1
Dunfermline Athletic	Total	38	2	2	0	2	0	0	0	1	0	43	2
Partick Thistle	2012–13	3	1	0	0	0	0	0	0	0	0	3	1
Partick Thistle	2013–14	16	1	0	0	0	0	0	0	0	0	16	1
Partick Thistle	2014–15	11	1	0	0	2	0	0	0	0	0	13	1
Partick Thistle	Total	30	3	0	0	2	0	0	0	0	0	32	3
Clyde	2016–17	11	0	3	0	0	0	0	0	0	0	14	0
Dumbarton	2019–20	6	0	1	0	3	0	0	0	1	0	11	0
Career total		112	5	8	0	8	0	1	0	2	0	131	5

== Honours ==
Rangers

- Scottish Cup: 2007–08
