= Jamie Ewings =

Scottish footballer and coach

Personal information
- Date of birth: 4 August 1984 (age 42)
- Place of birth: Bellshill, Scotland
- Position: Goalkeeper

Senior career*
Years	Team	Apps	(Gls)
2002–2005	Motherwell	0	(0)
2005–2007	Albion Rovers	40	(0)
2008	Drogheda United	32	(0)
2009–2010	Albion Rovers	35	(0)
2010–2011	Alloa Athletic	20	(0)
2011–2018	Dumbarton	71	(0)
2012	→ Arthurlie (loan)	3	(0)
Total		201	(0)

Managerial career
- 2018: Dumbarton (caretaker)
- * Club domestic league appearances and goals as of 28 April 2018

Jamie Ewings (born 4 August 1984) is a Scottish former footballer and goalkeeping coach.

== Career ==
Born in Bellshill, Ewings began his career at Motherwell but left the club in 2005 without making a first-team appearance. From there he moved to Albion Rovers. In 2007, he left Albion Rovers for a scholarship in the US.

In February 2008, Ewings signed for League of Ireland club Drogheda United on a one-year contract. During his time at Drogheda he played as the club took on Dynamo Kyiv in the UEFA Champions League qualifiers, but his stay there ended in disappointment with the club experiencing financial problems.

Ewings then returned to Scotland for a second spell at Albion Rovers. On 19 June 2010, he then moved to Alloa Athletic.

On 4 June 2011 Ewings signed for Dumbarton. In April 2012, he spent time on loan at junior club Arthurlie. Ahead of the 2013–14 season, Ewings signed a new one-year contract with Dumbarton. On 16 May 2014 Ewings committed himself to Dumbarton, signing a new one-year deal. Exactly a year later he signed on for another year at the Rock.

He made his first appearance for the club in 14 months keeping a clean sheet a 0–0 draw with Raith Rovers in January 2016, and became the club's first choice goalkeeper for the remainder of the season. He signed a new one-year deal with the club in May 2016, taking him into his sixth season with the club

He missed the first seven months of the 2016–17 season after picking up a serious back injury, and failed to make a competitive appearance for the club all season due to the form of Alan Martin. With Martin leaving that summer he was rewarded with a new deal in May 2017, taking into his 7th season with the Sons. In June 2017 it was announced that he would also become the club's new goalkeeping coach. After not featuring in a competitive game for 15 months, Ewings returned to action as a substitute for the injured Scott Gallacher in a Scottish Challenge Cup victory against Stranraer in October 2017. Ewings was released as a player in May 2018, but remained the club's goalkeeping coach. He was appointed joint caretaker manager along with Ian Durrant following Stephen Aitken's sacking in October 2018.

After nine seasons with the club as a player and coach, Ewings left Dumbarton in October 2020.
