= Henk van Schaik =

Dutch footballer

Personal information
- Date of birth: 20 January 1998 (age 28)
- Place of birth: Leiden, Netherlands
- Height: 1.91 m (6 ft 3 in)
- Position: Centre back

Team information
- Current team: IF Karlstad
- Number: 35

Youth career
- Quick Boys
- 2016–2017: ADO Den Haag

Senior career*
| Years | Team | Apps | (Gls) |
| 2017–2018 | Jong Twente | 18 | (3) |
| 2018–2019 | Livingston | 1 | (0) |
| 2019 | → Dumbarton (loan) | 6 | (0) |
| 2019 | Greenock Morton | 1 | (0) |
| 2020 | Jong Almere City | 3 | (0) |
| 2020–2023 | Eintracht Trier | 36 | (3) |
| 2023– | IF Karlstad | 14 | (1) |
- * Club domestic league appearances and goals as of 29 November 2023

Henk van Schaik (born 20 January 1998) is a Dutch professional footballer who plays for Swedish club IF Karlstad as a defender.

== Career ==
Born in Leiden, van Schaik spent time with Quick Boys, ADO Den Haag and Twente before signing for Scottish club Livingston in October 2018.

He made his senior debut on 11 November 2018, in the Scottish Premiership, appearing as a 90th-minute substitute in a 0–0 draw at home to Celtic. Van Schaik joined Scottish League One side Dumbarton on loan in January 2019.

He then moved to Greenock Morton for a nominal fee on 26 July 2019, however, he subsequently left the club only one month later on 28 August 2019 when his contract was terminated by mutual consent.

In January 2020, van Schaik joined Almere City FC, where he played for the club's U21/Jong team. He made three appearances for the team in the Derde Divisie, before moving to Germany and joining Oberliga Rheinland-Pfalz/Saar club SV Eintracht Trier 05, signing on 7 August 2020 until the summer 2022.
