= Blue Heaven (2003 TV series) =

- Directed by: Mike Alexander
- Country of origin: Scotland
- No. of series: 1
- No. of episodes: 6 + 1 Special

Production
- Producers: Clare Manning; Peter Barber-Fleming
- Running time: 30 minutes
- Production company: Saltire Films

Original release
- Network: BBC Scotland
- Release: 29 October 2003 – 24 May 2011

Blue Heaven is a Scottish television documentary series filmed by BBC Scotland which followed aspiring young footballers at Rangers Football Club as they tried to forge a career in football. The series was originally broadcast in the winter of 2003 with a follow-up episode in 2011.

== Background ==
The building of Rangers' new training facility in July 2001 was the catalyst for the filming of a six-part television series by BBC Scotland. The show documented the hopes and aspirations of a group of young footballers as they try to make the breakthrough at Rangers.

The production company, Saltire Films, was given unprecedented access for two years, the series begins during the Dick Advocaat era and continues through to the Alex McLeish's reign. The length of filming allowed for the following of particular youngsters.

Some of those would go on to graduate to the first team, Chris Burke for example. His Rangers debut covered during the series. Other players never made it as a professional footballer at all. Rangers-daft David Ford and his family's story is covered as Ford struggles to make an impact due to his lack of height and slight frame. The Head of Youth Development, Jan Derks, is replaced part-way through filming the series and is replaced by George Adams. Derks was seen deciding on the futures of young players, including Kevin Morrison, who was eventually released by the club.

In May 2011, a follow-up episode was broadcast featuring several of the trainees from the original documentary.

== Episodes ==
No.	Title	Original release date
1	"Episode 1"	29 October 2003
A Sixteen-year-old Charlie Adam leaves school and signs his first professional contract with Rangers and then puts himself to the test with a game against Old Firm rivals Celtic. Captain Andy Dowie's challenging training schedule is considered by his coaches as they discuss how to get the best out of him. Also the star player for the under-18 team the previous season struggles to recover from a career-threatening injury at the club's brand-new state-of-the-art training centre, Murray Park.
2	"Episode 2"	5 November 2003
Rangers under-13s team captain Jordan McMillan talent is showcased as the side play Feyenoord under-14s and their parents are invited for a discussion about the players mid-season assessment. Meanwhile, a Gorbals youngster celebrating his 18th birthday has high hopes of getting into the first team, but optimism is fading for a fellow player who can't get off the subs' bench.
3	"Episode 3"	12 November 2003
Rangers under-18s team embark on the road to the Scottish Youth Cup final, while the 13-to-15-year-olds prepare for their European trips. Meanwhile, Peter Leven recovers from his knee injury and Fife youngster Steven Campbell receives the offer of a lifetime.
4	"Episode 4"	19 November 2003
The 2002–03 season gets under way, and for the under-18s team, there's a surprise in store as they head for Australia. Chris Craig tries to put a family tragedy behind him to hone his record-breaking keepy-uppy skills, the under-15s team get a reputation for inconsistency and Peter Leven recovers from his recent injuries in time to take on Hibernian with the under-21s.
5	"Episode 5"	26 November 2003
Alex McLeish checks up on his recently injured first-teamers as they rejoin the Rangers under-21 side. Former Rangers player Kevin Morrison finds a new club in East Stirlingshire, after being released last season. David Ford takes to the pitch at Cathkin Park to play for the Rangers Boys Club after he too was released.
6	"Episode 6"	3 December 2003
The conclusion of the series, Jan Derks approaches the end of his tenure as the Head of Youth Development and the under-18s team look forward to their end-of-season bash. Goalkeeper Calum Reidford undergoes training with Stefan Klos and the other first team keepers, and McLeish makes a dream come true for the best members of the under-15s squad when he gives them a chance to play at Ibrox Stadium.
7	"Where are they now?"	24 May 2011
Almost ten years on, discover which of the young aspirant footballers made it to the first team.

== List of footballers which appeared ==
=== Players who graduated to first team ===
- Charlie Adam
- Steven Smith
- Chris Burke
- Jordan McMillan

=== Players who made careers with other clubs ===
- Steven Campbell
- Andy Dowie
- Calum Reidford
- Peter Leven
- Scott Agnew
