= Andrew Ellis (businessman) =

London-based football and property entrepreneur

Andrew Ellis is a London-based football and property entrepreneur. The founder and director of successful commercial and residential estate agency Wilton Estates with successful developments in Zanzibar and Portugal, among others, Andrew currently sits on the board of Glasgow Rangers, is a former director of QPR and was formerly chairman of Northampton Town.

== Football ==
In 2001, Ellis, was linked with a £9m takeover of Queens Park Rangers FC. Ellis' father, Peter Ellis, was QPR chairman during the mid-1990s.

2002 saw an Ellis-led consortium pay £500,000 for troubled Northampton Town FC, which was otherwise headed for liquidation. Ellis initially took over as chairman, later bringing brother-in-law David Cardoza in the role.

When Scottish businessman David Murray announced he was planning to sell Rangers F.C. in 2009, Ellis was one of the names linked with a bid. Speculation heightened in March 2010 when Rangers announced they had had discussions with Ellis. In June 2010, it was announced 'advanced talks' were taking place. Ellis joined the board of Rangers following the takeover of the club by Craig Whyte, he is a Director and 29% shareholder in the club.

In January 2012, Andrew Ellis told the BBC how he was "delighted to join the board at Rangers," stating his commitment to: "making sure Rangers remains the number one club in Scotland." When Rangers went into administration in February 2012 with an unpaid tax bill of £9 million, Ellis was the first board member to break ranks in apologising to the club's fans. He said: "I can only say I'm sorry to the Rangers fans. Bringing in Craig Whyte was done in good faith."
