= Calum Gallagher =

Scottish footballer (born 1994)

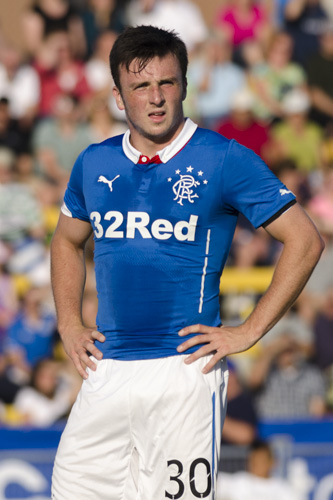
- Gallagher playing for Rangers in 2014

Personal information
- Full name: Calum Gallagher
- Date of birth: 13 September 1994 (age 32)
- Place of birth: Giffnock, Scotland
- Height: 5 ft 11 in (1.80 m)
- Position: Striker

Team information
- Current team: Alloa Athletic
- Number: 17

Youth career
- 2007–2008: Dundee United
- 2008–2010: Giffnock Soccer Centre
- 2010–2013: Rangers

Senior career*
Years	Team	Apps	(Gls)
2013–2015	Rangers	5	(1)
2012–2013	→ Alloa Athletic (loan)	9	(0)
2013–2014	→ East Stirlingshire (loan)	4	(2)
2014	→ Cowdenbeath (loan)	10	(5)
2015–2017	St Mirren	44	(6)
2017–2019	Dumbarton	68	(16)
2019–2024	Airdrieonians	149	(59)
2024–2025	Arbroath	27	(4)
2025–	Alloa Athletic	14	(1)
- * Club domestic league appearances and goals as of 4 May 2026

Calum Gallagher (born 13 September 1994) is a Scottish footballer who plays as a forward for Alloa Athletic. He has previously played for Rangers (with short loans at Alloa Athletic, East Stirlingshire and Cowdenbeath), St Mirren, Dumbarton and Airdrieonians; his longest spell was five seasons with Airdrie, departing in 2024 to join Arbroath.

== Career ==
=== Rangers ===
Gallagher came through the Rangers youth system. He played for Alloa Athletic and East Stirlingshire on loan to gain first team experience. On 15 March 2014, Gallagher made his Rangers debut and scored in a 2–0 victory over Dunfermline Athletic. He joined Cowdenbeath on loan in September 2014.

=== St Mirren ===
Gallagher left Rangers in August 2015 and signed a one-year contract with St Mirren; he scored his first goal for the Paisley side in a 3–2 defeat against Livingston in the Scottish League Cup on 25 August 2015. He scored eight goals in 41 appearances for the club in his first season, and signed a one-year contract extension in May 2016.

=== Dumbarton ===
Gallagher left St Mirren in January 2017, signing for Scottish Championship rivals Dumbarton on a short-term contract until the end of the season. After making three starts and four substitute appearances, grabbing one assist, in May 2017 he extended his contract until the end of the 2017–18 season. Whilst at the Sons, Gallagher scored his first career brace in a 3–2 Scottish Cup victory against Peterhead in January 2018. After finishing as the club's top scorer with seven for the season as Dumbarton were relegated to Scottish League One, Gallagher signed a new one-year deal in June 2018. In his third season at the club he again finished top scorer with 14 goals, the best return of his career to date.

=== Airdrieonians ===
Gallagher turned down a new deal with Dumbarton and joined another Scottish League One club, Airdrieonians, in June 2019. He was their top scorer in the 2021–22 and 2022–23 seasons, helping the Diamonds gain promotion back to the Championship via the play-offs in 2022-23 and being named the division's PFA Scotland Players' Player of the Year for that season.

=== Arbroath ===
In April 2024, Gallagher signed a pre-contract agreement with Arbroath.

== Career statistics ==
As of 1 July 2025

Appearances and goals by club, season and competition
Club	Season	League			National Cup		League Cup		Other		Total	
Club	Season	Division	Apps	Goals	Apps	Goals	Apps	Goals	Apps	Goals	Apps	Goals
Rangers	2012–13	Scottish Third Division	0	0	0	0	0	0	0	0	0	0
Rangers	2013–14	Scottish League One	4	1	1	0	0	0	1 (Note: Appearances in the Scottish Challenge Cup)	0	6	1
Rangers	2014–15	Scottish Championship	1	0	0	0	0	0	0	0	1	0
Rangers	Total		5	1	1	0	0	0	1	0	7	1
Alloa Athletic (loan)	2012–13	Scottish Second Division	9	0	0	0	0	0	0	0	9	0
East Stirlingshire (loan)	2013–14	Scottish League Two	4	2	0	0	0	0	0	0	4	2
Cowdenbeath (loan)	2014–15	Scottish Championship	10	5	0	0	0	0	0	0	10	5
St Mirren	2015–16	Scottish Championship	36	6	1	0	1	1	3	1	41	8
St Mirren	2016–17	Scottish Championship	8	0	0	0	4	0	1	0	13	0
St Mirren	Total		44	6	1	0	5	1	4	1	54	8
Dumbarton	2016–17	Scottish Championship	7	0	0	0	0	0	0	0	7	0
Dumbarton	2017–18	Scottish Championship	28	3	2	2	4	0	8 (Note: Six appearances and one goal in the Scottish Challenge Cup and two appearances and one goal in the Scottish Championship play-offs)	2	42	7
Dumbarton	2018–19	Scottish League One	33	13	1	0	4	1	2	0	40	14
Dumbarton	Total		68	16	3	2	8	1	10	2	89	21
Airdrieonians	2019–20	Scottish League One	25	11	1	0	3	1	3	2	32	14
Airdrieonians	2020–21	Scottish League One	21	6	0	0	2	0	4 (Note: Appearances in the Championship play-offs)	2	27	8
Airdrieonians	2021–22	Scottish League One	34	15	1	0	4	0	4 (Note: Four appearances and one goal in the Scottish Championship play-offs)	1	43	16
Airdrieonians	2022–23	Scottish League One	36	22	1	1	3	0	5 (Note: One appearance in Scottish Challenge Cup, and four appearances in the Scottish Championship play-offs)	0	45	23
Airdrieonians	2023–24	Scottish Championship	33	5	3	1	5	2	6 (Note: Four appearances and one goal in the Scottish Challenge Cup, and two appearances in the Scottish Premiership play-offs)	1	47	9
Airdrieonians	Total		149	59	6	2	17	3	22	6	194	70
Career total			289	89	11	4	30	5	37	9	367	107

== Honours ==
Individual

- PFA Scotland Players' Player of the Year: 2022–23 Scottish League One
- Scottish League One Player of the Month: April 2019
- Scottish Challenge Cup: 2023–24
