= 2018–19 Scottish League One =

Scottish League One
- Season: 2018–19
- Dates: 4 August 2018 – 4 May 2019
- Champions: Arbroath
- Promoted: Arbroath
- Relegated: Stenhousemuir; Brechin City
- Matches: 180
- Goals: 522 (2.9 per match)
- Top goalscorer: Kevin Nisbet (30 goals)
- Biggest home win: Raith Rovers 4–0 Forfar Athletic (1 September 2018); Dumbarton 4–0 East Fife (27 October 2018); Brechin City 4–0 Forfar Athletic (10 November 2018); Raith Rovers 5–1 Stenhousemuir (5 January 2019)
- Biggest away win: Montrose 0–4 Arbroath (4 August 2018); Dumbarton 1–5 Raith Rovers (29 September 2018); Forfar Athletic 0–4 East Fife (6 October 2018); Brechin City 1–5 Arbroath (17 November 2018)
- Highest scoring: Airdrieonians 3–4 Raith Rovers (25 August 2018); Arbroath 5–2 Stenhousemuir (1 December 2018); Stranraer 3–4 East Fife (26 January 2019); Montrose 5–2 Brechin City (2 February 2019); East Fife 3–4 Dumbarton (23 February 2019)
- Longest winning run: 8 matches: Arbroath
- Longest unbeaten run: 17 matches: Arbroath
- Longest winless run: 9 matches: East Fife
- Longest losing run: 6 matches: Brechin City
- Highest attendance: 2,833; Raith Rovers 1–2 East Fife (29 December 2018)
- Lowest attendance: 219; Stranraer 1–1 Stenhousemuir (26 February 2019)
- Total attendance: 135,576
- Average attendance: 753 (78)
- All statistics correct as of 4 May 2019.

The 2018–19 Scottish League One (known as the Ladbrokes League One for sponsorship reasons) was the 25th season in the current format of 10 teams in the third-tier of Scottish football. The fixtures were published on 15 June 2018 and the season began on 4 August 2018.

Ten teams contested the league: Airdrieonians, Arbroath, Brechin City, Dumbarton, East Fife, Forfar Athletic, Montrose, Raith Rovers, Stenhousemuir and Stranraer.

Arbroath won the league following a 1–1 draw at Brechin City on 13 April 2019. Brechin were relegated after a 1–1 draw with Stenhousemuir on the final day.

== Teams ==
The following teams have changed division since the 2017–18 season.

=== To League One ===
Promoted from League Two

- Montrose
- Stenhousemuir

Relegated from the Championship

- Brechin City
- Dumbarton

=== From League One ===
Relegated to League Two

- Albion Rovers
- Queen's Park

Promoted to the Championship

- Ayr United
- Alloa Athletic

=== Stadia and locations ===
Airdrieonians	Arbroath	Brechin City	Dumbarton
Excelsior Stadium	Gayfield Park	Glebe Park	Dumbarton Football Stadium
Capacity: 10,101	Capacity: 6,600	Capacity: 4,123	Capacity: 2,020
East Fife	Location of teams in 2018–19 League One		Forfar Athletic
Bayview Stadium	Location of teams in 2018–19 League One		Station Park
Capacity: 1,980	Location of teams in 2018–19 League One		Capacity: 6,777
Montrose	Raith Rovers	Stenhousemuir	Stranraer
Links Park	Stark's Park	Ochilview Park	Stair Park
Capacity: 4,936	Capacity: 8,867	Capacity: 3,746	Capacity: 4,178

=== Personnel and kits ===
Team	Manager	Captain	Kit manufacturer	Shirt sponsor
Airdrieonians	(Scotland) Ian Murray	(Scotland) Sean Crighton	Hummel	Holemasters
Arbroath	(Scotland) Dick Campbell	(Scotland) Mark Whatley	Pendle	Megatech
Brechin City	(Scotland) Barry Smith	(Scotland) Paul McLean	Pendle	JJKS Estates (Home); Ferguson Oliver (Away)
Dumbarton	(Scotland) Jim Duffy	(Scotland) Ross Forbes	Joma	Turnberry Homes
East Fife	(Scotland) Darren Young	(Scotland) Kevin Smith	Joma	Liam Anderson Architectural Services (Home); EF Joinery (Away)
Forfar Athletic	(Scotland) Jim Weir	(South Africa) Michael Travis	Pendle	Orchard Timber Products
Montrose	(Scotland) Stewart Petrie	(Scotland) Paul Watson	Nike	Carnegie Fuels Ltd
Raith Rovers	(Scotland) John McGlynn	(Scotland) Kyle Benedictus	Puma	valmcdermid.com (Home); Tag Games (Away)
Stenhousemuir	(Scotland) Colin McMenamin	(Scotland) Graeme Smith	Mitre	Warriors in the Community
Stranraer	(Scotland) Stephen Farrell	(Scotland) Jamie Hamill	Joma	Stena Line

=== Managerial changes ===
Team	Outgoing manager	Manner of departure	Date of vacancy	Position in table	Incoming manager	Date of appointment
Raith Rovers	(Scotland) Barry Smith	Resigned	4 September 2018	2nd	(Scotland) John McGlynn	25 September 2018
Airdrieonians	(Scotland) Stevie Findlay	Sacked	8 October 2018	6th	(Scotland) Ian Murray	19 October 2018
Dumbarton	(Scotland) Stephen Aitken	Sacked	8 October 2018	9th	(Scotland) Jim Duffy	21 October 2018
Brechin City	(Scotland) Darren Dods	Sacked	30 October 2018	6th	(Scotland) Barry Smith	5 November 2018
Stenhousemuir	(Scotland) Brown Ferguson	Sacked	6 November 2018	9th	(Scotland) Colin McMenamin	28 November 2018

== League summary ==
=== League table ===
Pos	Team	Pld	W	D	L	GF	GA	GD	Pts	Promotion, qualification or relegation
1	Arbroath (C, P)	36	20	10	6	63	38	+25	70	Promotion to the Championship
2	Forfar Athletic	36	19	6	11	54	47	+7	63	Qualification for the Championship play-offs
3	Raith Rovers	36	16	12	8	74	48	+26	60	Qualification for the Championship play-offs
4	Montrose	36	15	6	15	49	50	−1	51	Qualification for the Championship play-offs
5	Airdrieonians	36	14	6	16	51	44	+7	48	
6	Dumbarton	36	12	10	14	60	60	0	46	
7	East Fife	36	13	7	16	49	56	−7	46	
8	Stranraer	36	11	9	16	45	57	−12	42	
9	Stenhousemuir (R)	36	10	7	19	35	61	−26	37	Qualification for the League One play-offs
10	Brechin City (R)	36	9	9	18	42	61	−19	36	Relegation to League Two

Source: SPFL
Rules for classification: 1) Points; 2) Goal difference; 3) Number of goals scored
(C) Champions; (P) Promoted; (R) Relegated

=== Positions by round ===
The table lists the positions of teams after each week of matches. In order to preserve chronological progress, any postponed matches are not included in the round at which they were originally scheduled but added to the full round they were played immediately afterwards. For example, if a match is scheduled for matchday 13, but then postponed and played between days 16 and 17, it will be added to the standings for day 16.

Leader - Promotion to 2019–20 Championship
Qualification for Championship play-offs
Qualification for League One play-offs
Relegation to 2019–20 League Two

Team \ Round	1	2	3	4	5	6	7	8	9	10	11	12	13	14	15	16	17	18	19	20	21	22	23	24	25	26	27	28	29	30	31	32	33	34	35	36
Arbroath	1	1	1	1	1	1	1	1	1	1	1	1	1	1	1	1	1	1	1	1	1	1	1	1	1	1	1	1	1	1	1	1	1	1	1	1
Forfar Athletic	8	4	5	3	5	8	8	7	8	7	4	4	4	4	4	5	4	5	4	4	4	4	4	3	3	3	2	3	2	3	3	3	3	2	2	2
Raith Rovers	5	2	4	2	2	2	2	2	2	2	2	2	2	2	2	2	2	2	2	2	2	2	2	2	2	2	3	2	3	2	2	2	2	3	3	3
Montrose	10	8	3	6	7	10	9	9	10	10	10	6	9	8	7	4	5	4	6	6	6	6	5	5	5	5	5	5	5	5	5	5	4	4	4	4
Airdrieonians	2	3	2	4	3	3	3	4	6	4	5	7	6	5	5	6	6	6	5	5	5	5	6	6	6	6	6	7	7	6	6	6	6	6	6	5
Dumbarton	3	5	6	8	9	6	6	8	9	9	9	10	8	9	8	8	8	8	8	8	8	9	9	10	8	7	7	6	6	7	7	7	7	7	7	6
East Fife	9	10	10	10	10	7	4	3	3	3	3	3	3	3	3	3	3	3	3	3	3	3	3	4	4	4	4	4	4	4	4	4	5	5	5	7
Stranraer	6	9	9	7	8	5	7	6	5	6	7	5	7	6	6	7	7	7	7	7	7	7	7	7	9	8	8	8	8	9	9	8	8	8	8	8
Stenhousemuir	4	7	8	9	6	9	10	10	7	8	8	9	10	10	10	10	10	10	10	10	10	10	10	9	10	10	10	10	10	10	10	10	10	10	9	9
Brechin City	7	6	7	5	4	4	5	5	4	5	6	8	5	7	9	9	9	9	9	9	9	8	8	8	7	9	9	9	9	8	8	9	9	9	10	10

Source: BBC Sport
Updated: 4 May 2019

== Results ==
Teams play each other four times, twice in the first half of the season (home and away) and twice in the second half of the season (home and away), making a total of 36 games.

=== First half of season ===
Home \ Away	AIR	ARB	BRE	DUM	EFI	FOR	MON	RAI	STE	STR
Airdrieonians	—	0–1	1–3	1–1	4–2	0–1	0–1	3–4	0–1	2–0
Arbroath	3–1	—	2–2	3–1	1–0	3–1	2–0	0–2	5–2	3–1
Brechin City	0–1	1–5	—	3–2	1–0	4–0	1–3	1–1	1–2	1–1
Dumbarton	1–1	1–1	4–1	—	4–0	0–2	2–1	1–5	2–1	0–1
East Fife	2–1	0–3	3–1	0–2	—	1–0	0–2	2–1	2–0	3–3
Forfar Athletic	1–3	2–3	1–1	3–0	0–4	—	2–1	3–2	2–0	0–0
Montrose	0–3	0–4	2–1	1–0	0–2	2–2	—	3–2	3–1	1–1
Raith Rovers	2–0	1–1	2–1	4–2	2–2	4–0	1–1	—	2–0	2–1
Stenhousemuir	1–2	1–2	1–0	2–1	0–2	1–2	3–2	1–3	—	0–2
Stranraer	1–2	0–1	0–2	3–2	0–2	2–1	2–0	1–1	2–0	—

Source: Scottish League One
Legend: Blue = home team win; Yellow = draw; Red = away team win.

=== Second half of season ===
Home \ Away	AIR	ARB	BRE	DUM	EFI	FOR	MON	RAI	STE	STR
Airdrieonians	—	3–0	0–1	2–2	0–0	1–0	1–0	1–1	0–1	3–0
Arbroath	3–2	—	1–0	1–1	2–1	0–2	1–0	2–2	0–2	1–1
Brechin City	0–3	1–1	—	1–0	0–0	2–2	0–3	2–1	1–1	1–2
Dumbarton	3–3	2–0	2–1	—	3–0	2–3	1–1	2–2	1–2	2–1
East Fife	1–2	1–1	0–2	3–4	—	2–3	0–2	1–2	1–1	3–1
Forfar Athletic	2–0	2–1	2–0	0–0	3–0	—	1–0	2–1	2–1	2–1
Montrose	2–1	1–1	5–2	1–3	0–2	2–0	—	1–1	2–0	3–1
Raith Rovers	1–0	0–1	3–2	4–1	1–2	1–1	4–1	—	5–1	2–3
Stenhousemuir	1–0	1–4	2–2	2–2	1–1	0–3	1–0	1–1	—	0–1
Stranraer	1–4	0–0	3–0	0–3	3–4	2–1	1–2	2–2	1–1	—

Source: Scottish League One
Legend: Blue = home team win; Yellow = draw; Red = away team win.

== Season statistics ==
=== Scoring ===
==== Top scorers ====
As of 4 May 2019

Rank	Player	Club	Goals
1	(Scotland) Kevin Nisbet	Raith Rovers	29
2	(Scotland) Bobby Linn	Arbroath	21
3	(Scotland) John Baird	Forfar Athletic	16
3	(Scotland) Mark McGuigan	Stenhousemuir	16
5	(Scotland) Leighton McIntosh	Airdrieonians	15
6	(Scotland) Dom Thomas	Dumbarton	14

==== Hat-tricks ====
Player	For	Against	Result	Date	Ref
(Scotland) Liam Buchanan	Raith Rovers	Airdrieonians	3–4 (A)	25 August 2018	
(Scotland) Bobby Linn	Arbroath	Forfar	3–1 (H)	15 September 2018	
(Scotland) Bobby Linn	Arbroath	Forfar	2–3 (A)	8 December 2018	
(Scotland) Bobby Linn	Arbroath	Airdrieonians	3–2 (H)	23 February 2019	
(Scotland) Dom Thomas	Dumbarton	East Fife	3–4 (A)	23 February 2019	
(Scotland) Leighton McIntosh	Airdrieonians	Stranraer	1–4 (A)	4 May 2019	

Note

(H) = Home, (A) = Away

=== Attendances ===
Pos	Team	Total	High	Low	Average	Change
1	Airdrieonians	13,743	1,140	600	763	−0.7%
2	Arbroath	17,109	1,808	532	950	+23.1%
3	Brechin City	10,457	1,509	355	580	−37.2%
4	Dumbarton	11,116	756	456	617	−26.4%
5	East Fife	12,561	1,756	323	697	+2.0%
6	Forfar Athletic	11,976	1,342	459	665	+7.6%
7	Montrose	14,210	1,666	486	789	+9.1%
8	Raith Rovers	28,004	2,833	1,089	1,555	−17.6%
9	Stenhousemuir	10,286	797	362	571	+36.0%
10	Stranraer	6,108	432	219	339	−23.3%
	League total	135,576	2,833	219	753	−9.4%

Updated to games played on 4 May 2019

== Awards ==
Month	Manager of the Month		Player of the Month		Ref.
Month	Manager	Club	Player	Club	Ref.
August	(Scotland) Dick Campbell	Arbroath	(Scotland) Ryan Wallace	Arbroath	
September	(Scotland) Darren Young	East Fife	(Scotland) Bobby Linn	Arbroath	
October	(Scotland) Dick Campbell	Arbroath	(Scotland) Kevin Nisbet	Raith Rovers	
November	(Scotland) Dick Campbell	Arbroath	(Scotland) Ricky Little	Arbroath	
December	(Scotland) Stewart Petrie	Montrose	(Scotland) Martin Rennie	Montrose	
January	(Scotland) Jim Weir	Forfar Athletic	(Scotland) Anton Dowds	East Fife	
February	(Scotland) Jim Duffy	Dumbarton	(Scotland) Dom Thomas	Dumbarton	
March	(Scotland) Jim Weir	Forfar Athletic	(Scotland) Dale Hilson	Forfar Athletic	
April	(Scotland) Jim Duffy	Dumbarton	(Scotland) Calum Gallagher	Dumbarton	

== League One play-offs ==
The second bottom team (Stenhousemuir) entered into a four-team playoff with the second, third, and fourth placed teams in League Two (Clyde, Edinburgh City and Annan Athletic). Clyde were promoted to League One after defeating Annan 2–0 in the final. Stenhousemuir were relegated to League Two after defeat to Annan in the semi-final.

=== Semi-final ===
==== First leg ====
7 May 2019	Annan Athletic	2–0	Stenhousemuir	Annan
19:45	Johnston 8'; Sonkur 39'	Report		Stadium: Galabank; Attendance: 637; Referee: Steven Reid

7 May 2019	Edinburgh City	0–1	Clyde	Edinburgh
19:45		Report	Syvertsen 15'	Stadium: Ainslie Park; Attendance: 617; Referee: Barry Cook

==== Second leg ====
11 May 2019	Stenhousemuir	1–2 (1–4 agg.)	Annan Athletic	Stenhousemuir
15:00	Marsh 37'	Report	Bradley 10'; Swinglehurst 73'	Stadium: Ochilview Park; Attendance: 794; Referee: David Munro

11 May 2019	Clyde	3–0 (4–0 agg.)	Edinburgh City	Cumbernauld
15:00	Syvertsen 14'; Love 48'; Goodwillie 58'	Report		Stadium: Broadwood Stadium; Attendance: 1,204; Referee: Craig Napier

=== Final ===
==== First leg ====
14 May 2019	Annan Athletic	1–0	Clyde	Annan
19:45	Johnston 22'	Report		Stadium: Galabank; Attendance: 1,006; Referee: Greg Aitken

==== Second leg ====
18 May 2019	Clyde	2–0 (2–1 agg.)	Annan Athletic	Cumbernauld
15:00	McNiff 60'; Love 86' (pen.)	Report		Stadium: Broadwood Stadium; Attendance: 2,725; Referee: Bobby Madden
