= Dom Thomas =

Scottish footballer (born 1996)

Personal information
- Date of birth: 14 February 1996 (age 30)
- Place of birth: Glasgow, Scotland
- Position: Winger

Team information
- Current team: Hamilton Academical
- Number: 7

Youth career
- Celtic
- 2010–2015: Motherwell

Senior career*
Years	Team	Apps	(Gls)
2014–2017	Motherwell	33	(0)
2016–2017	→ Queen of the South (loan)	17	(3)
2017–2020	Kilmarnock	30	(1)
2018	→ Queen of the South (loan)	14	(2)
2018–2019	→ Dumbarton (loan)	12	(4)
2019	→ Dumbarton (loan)	14	(10)
2020	→ Dunfermline Athletic (loan)	8	(1)
2020–2022	Dunfermline Athletic	46	(5)
2022–2025	Queen's Park	83	(19)
2025	Derry City	13	(1)
2025	Ayr United	7	(0)
2026	Airdrieonians	11	(3)
2026–	Hamilton Academical	10	(1)

International career^{‡}
2017	Scotland U21	6	(0)
- * Club domestic league appearances and goals as of 18 October 2026 ‡ National team caps and goals as of 4 March 2019

Dominic Thomas (born 14 February 1996) is a Scottish professional footballer who plays as a winger for Scottish League One club Hamilton Academical. Thomas, who started his professional career with Motherwell, has also played for Kilmarnock, Queen of the South, Dumbarton, Queen's Park, Dunfermline Athletic, Ayr United, Airdrieonians and Derry City.

A former Celtic academy player, Thomas made his Motherwell debut in 2014 and went on to sign a new contract in 2015. He joined Kilmarnock in 2017 and had multiple loan spells before signing a permanent deal with Dunfermline Athletic in 2020. Internationally, Thomas represented Scotland at the Under-21 level with six caps.

== Club career ==
=== Motherwell ===
Thomas was a product of Celtic's academy until 2010 and then transferred to the Fir Park club.

On 20 December 2014, Thomas made his debut for Motherwell as a substitute in a narrow away win versus St Mirren. Thomas signed a new contract with the Steelmen on 6 March 2015 to keep him at the club until 2018.

Although by now established in the senior squad, at the end of the 2015–16 season Thomas returned to the Motherwell Development team to help them win the Scottish Youth Cup for the first time.

==== Queen of the South (first loan spell) ====
On 1 January 2017, Thomas was loaned to Queen of the South for the second half of the 2016–17 season. Thomas debuted for the club on 7 January 2017, in a 3–0 away win at St Mirren. The following weekend, Thomas scored his first and the Doonhamers' third goal in a 3–3 draw versus Dundee United at Tannadice. Thomas returned his parent club Motherwell at the end of the season.

=== Kilmarnock ===
==== 2017–18 ====
Thomas requested a transfer from Motherwell during summer of 2017. He was duly released by the Lanarkshire club and signed a three-year contract with Kilmarnock on 12 July 2017.

On 30 January 2018, Thomas returned to Palmerston Park until the end of the 2017–18 season, joining the Doonhamers for a second loan spell.

==== 2018–19: Dumbarton loans ====
Thomas joined Scottish League One side Dumbarton on loan in September 2018, scoring on his debut in a defeat against Stranraer.

After returning to Kilmarnock in January 2019, and being named in the club's squad for their Scottish Cup tie with Forfar Athletic, Thomas re-joined Dumbarton on loan on deadline day. During his time at the club he was nominated for PFA Scottish League One Players' Player of the Year and won Dumbarton's Young Player of the Year award. In total he made 26 appearances for the Sons, scoring 14 times and was named in the PFA Scotland League One Team of the Year.

==== 2019–20 ====
Thomas played regularly for Kilmarnock in the first part of the season, although mainly as a substitute. He was loaned to Championship club Dunfermline Athletic in January 2020, a day after Killie teammate Greg Kiltie had been recalled from a loan there. Although the 2019–20 was curtailed, Thomas impressed during his brief loan period with the side, and was signed on a permanent two-year deal on 10 July 2020.

=== Queen's Park ===
On 27 May 2022, Thomas signed for Scottish Championship side Queen's Park.

=== Derry City ===
On 20 January 2025, Thomas signed a two-year deal with League of Ireland Premier Division side Derry City.

=== Ayr United ===
On 24 June 2025, Thomas signed for Scottish Championship side Ayr United.

=== Airdrieonians ===
On 30 January 2026, Thomas signed for Scottish Championship side Airdrieonians.

=== Hamilton Academical ===
On 24 June 2026, Thomas signed for Scottish League One side Hamilton Academical.

== International career ==
In March 2017, Thomas made his first appearance for the Scotland Under-21 side in a friendly against Estonia. He was capped six times at that level.

== Personal life ==
Thomas attended Trinity High School (Rutherglen) and was in the same year group as fellow Celtic youth team player and future Kilmarnock teammate Stuart Findlay; Kevin Nisbet, who later was playing for Dunfermline when Thomas arrived, was in the year below at the school.

In 2017 he began operating a youth football training programme based at the sports centre attached to his former school.

== Career statistics ==
As of match played on 13 June 2025

Appearances and goals by club, season and competition
Club	Season	League			National cup		League cup		Other		Total	
Club	Season	Division	Apps	Goals	Apps	Goals	Apps	Goals	Apps	Goals	Apps	Goals
Motherwell	2013–14	Scottish Premiership	0	0	0	0	0	0	–		0	0
Motherwell	2014–15	Scottish Premiership	15	0	0	0	0	0	–		15	0
Motherwell	2015–16	Scottish Premiership	14	0	1	0	2	0	–		17	0
Motherwell	2016–17	Scottish Premiership	4	0	0	0	3	0	–		7	0
Motherwell	Total		33	0	1	0	5	0	–		39	0
Queen of the South (loan)	2016–17	Scottish Championship	17	3	–		–		1 (Note: Appearance(s) in the Scottish Challenge Cup)	0	18	3
Kilmarnock	2017–18	Scottish Premiership	9	0	0	0	4	2	–		13	2
Kilmarnock	2018–19	Scottish Premiership	0	0	0	0	2	0	–		2	0
Kilmarnock	2019–20	Scottish Premiership	20	1	0	0	2	1	2 (Note: Appearance(s) in the UEFA Europa League)	0	24	2
Kilmarnock	Total		29	1	0	0	8	3	2	0	39	4
Queen of the South (loan)	2017–18	Scottish Championship	14	2	–		–		–		14	2
Dumbarton (loan)	2018–19	Scottish League One	26	14	0	0	–		–		26	14
Dunfermline Athletic (loan)	2019–20	Scottish Championship	8	1	–		–		–		8	1
Dunfermline Athletic	2020–21	Scottish Championship	21	1	1	0	6	0	2 (Note: Appearances in the Scottish Premiership Playoffs)	0	30	1
Dunfermline Athletic	2021–22	Scottish Championship	25	4	1	0	5	1	0	0	31	5
Dunfermline Athletic	Total		46	5	2	0	11	1	2	0	61	6
Queen's Park	2022–23	Scottish Championship	35	5	2	3	4	0	5 (Note: Two appearances, two goals in the Scottish Premiership Playoffs; three appearances, two goals in the Scottish Challenge Cup)	4	46	12
Queen's Park	2023–24	Scottish Championship	33	10	1	0	4	0	2	0	40	10
Queen's Park	2024–25	Scottish Championship	15	4	1	0	5	2	2	1	23	7
Queen's Park	Total		83	19	4	3	13	2	9	5	109	29
Derry City	2025	LOI Premier Division	13	1	–		–		–		13	1
Ayr United	2025–26	Scottish Championship	0	0	0	0	0	0	0	0	0	0
Career total			269	46	7	3	37	6	14	5	327	60

== Honours ==
- Scottish League One Player of the Month: February 2019
