= Stephen Aitken =

Scottish footballer and coach

Personal information
- Full name: Stephen Aitken
- Date of birth: 25 September 1976 (age 50)
- Place of birth: Glasgow, Scotland
- Position: Midfielder

Youth career
- –1993: Erskine B.C.

Senior career*
Years	Team	Apps	(Gls)
1993–2001	Greenock Morton	113	(4)
2001–2007	Stranraer	156	(5)
2007	Stenhousemuir	11	(0)
2007–2009	Arthurlie	?	(?)
2009–2011	Stranraer	19	(0)

Managerial career
- 2012–2015: Stranraer
- 2015–2018: Dumbarton
- 2020–2021: East Kilbride
- * Club domestic league appearances and goals

Stephen Aitken (born 25 September 1976 in Glasgow) is a Scottish football player and coach who was most recently manager of East Kilbride.

Aitken played for Greenock Morton, Stranraer, Stenhousemuir and Junior side Arthurlie. He rejoined Stranraer in 2009 as assistant manager to Keith Knox. Aitken retired as a player in 2011, and he has since managed Stranraer and Dumbarton.

His younger brother Chris is also a former footballer.

== Playing career ==
Aitken started his senior career with Greenock Morton, where he played for eight years before moving to Stranraer where he stayed for six years. Upon leaving Stranraer he joined Stenhousemuir briefly, before leaving the senior game to join Barrhead side Arthurlie in the Junior ranks.

== Coaching career ==
In 2009, he returned to Stranraer for a second time at the age of 32, and shortly thereafter took up a role as assistant manager. On 27 October 2012 Aitken was appointed manager at the club.

After a successful three years with Stranraer he joined Dumbarton in May 2015, to replace Ian Murray. He won his first competitive game in charge 3–2 against former club Greenock Morton. After keeping the club in the Scottish Championship for both of his seasons in charge, he agreed a new 2-year deal in May 2017.

Aitken led the Sons to the Scottish Challenge Cup Final the following season, but a difficult league campaign resulted in relegation to Scottish League One after defeat to Alloa Athletic in the Scottish Championship play-offs. After a slow start to the 2018–19 Scottish League One season left the club in ninth position, Aitken left Dumbarton in October 2018.

Aitken was appointed manager of Lowland League team East Kilbride in May 2020. After his first season was declared null and void due to the COVID-19 pandemic in Scotland, Aitken left Kilby a month into the 2021-22 campaign after the club's worst start to a season in their history.

== Managerial statistics ==
As of 11 August 2021

Team	From	To	Record				
Team	From	To	G	W	D	L	Win %
Stranraer	October 2012	May 2015	124	54	27	43	43.55
Dumbarton	May 2015	October 2018	154	42	38	74	27.27
East Kilbride	May 2020	August 2021	8	1	4	3	12.50
Total			286	97	69	120	33.92

- East Kilbride statistics include League Cup forfeit victory against Kilmarnock on 10 July 2021.

== Honours and achievements ==
=== Player ===
Greenock Morton

- Scottish Second Division: 1994–95

Stranraer

- Scottish Third Division: 2003–04
- Scottish Second Division promotion: 2004–05
