= List of Scottish football transfers summer 2017 =

This is a list of Scottish football transfers, featuring at least one 2017–18 Scottish Premiership club or one 2017–18 Scottish Championship club, which were completed during the summer 2017 transfer window. The window closed at midnight on 31 August 2017.

== List ==
| Date | Name | Moving from | Moving to | Fee |
|---|---|---|---|---|
| 18 May 2017 | Chris Higgins | Queen of the South | Ayr United | Free |
| 18 May 2017 | Stevie Mallan | St Mirren | Barnsley | Undisclosed |
| 19 May 2017 | Morgyn Neill | Livingston | Stranraer | Free |
| 21 May 2017 | Tom Lang | Dumbarton | Stranraer | Free |
| 22 May 2017 | Cammy Smith | Aberdeen | St Mirren | Free |
| 22 May 2017 | Evan Horne | Dunfermline Athletic | St Mirren | Free |
| 23 May 2017 | Michael Moffat | Dunfermline Athletic | Ayr United | Free |
| 23 May 2017 | Callum Fordyce | Dunfermline Athletic | Queen of the South | Free |
| 23 May 2017 | Matty Allan | Dundee | Montrose | Free |
| 24 May 2017 | Ross M. Stewart | Albion Rovers | St Mirren | Free |
| 24 May 2017 | Jordan Kirkpatrick | Alloa Athletic | St Mirren | Free |
| 24 May 2017 | David Amoo | Partick Thistle | Cambridge United | Free |
| 25 May 2017 | Alan Martin | Dumbarton | Queen of the South | Free |
| 25 May 2017 | Andy Geggan | Dunfermline Athletic | Ayr United | Free |
| 25 May 2017 | Craig Moore | Motherwell | Ayr United | Free |
| 26 May 2017 | Ross C. Stewart | Albion Rovers | St Mirren | Free |
| 26 May 2017 | Gregor Buchanan | Dumbarton | St Mirren | Free |
| 26 May 2017 | Jamie Hamill | Queen of the South | Stranraer | Free |
| 29 May 2017 | Simon Murray | Dundee United | Hibernian | Free |
| 30 May 2017 | Lionel Ainsworth | Motherwell | Plymouth Argyle | Free |
| 31 May 2017 | Jamie Henry | Aberdeen | Arbroath | Free |
| 31 May 2017 | Darren McCormack | Brechin City | Free agent | Free |
| 31 May 2017 | Ross Caldwell | Brechin City | East Kilbride | Free |
| 31 May 2017 | Kris Commons | Celtic | Retired | Free |
| 31 May 2017 | Kolo Toure | Celtic | Retired | Free |
| 31 May 2017 | Donald McCallum | Dumbarton | Campbeltown Pupils AFC | Free |
| 31 May 2017 | Kévin Gomis | Dundee | Grand Quevilly | Free |
| 31 May 2017 | Calvin Colquhoun | Dundee | Downfield Juniors | Free |
| 31 May 2017 | Josh Skelly | Dundee | Arbroath | Free |
| 31 May 2017 | Wato Kuate | Dundee United | Hapoel Petah Tikva | Free |
| 31 May 2017 | Aaron Murrell | Dundee United | Berwick Rangers | Free |
| 31 May 2017 | Frank van der Struijk | Dundee United | ODC Boxtel | Free |
| 31 May 2017 | Cameron Eadie | Falkirk | Elgin City | Free |
| 31 May 2017 | Lewis McMinn | Falkirk | Stenhousemuir | Free |
| 31 May 2017 | Kudus Oyenuga | Greenock Morton | Chelmsford City | Free |
| 31 May 2017 | Jon Scullion | Greenock Morton | Kilbirnie Ladeside | Free |
| 31 May 2017 | Conor Pepper | Greenock Morton | Glentoran | Free |
| 31 May 2017 | Thomas Orr | Greenock Morton | Queen's Park | Free |
| 31 May 2017 | Gramoz Kurtaj | Hamilton Academical | SHB-Da Nang | Free |
| 31 May 2017 | Blair Adams | Hamilton Academical | Hartlepool United | Free |
| 31 May 2017 | Alex D'Acol | Hamilton Academical | PAS Lamia | Free |
| 31 May 2017 | Tasos Avlonitis | Heart of Midlothian | Panathinaikos | Free |
| 31 May 2017 | Brian McLean | Hibernian | IBV | Free |
| 31 May 2017 | Grant Holt | Hibernian | King's Lynn Town | Free |
| 31 May 2017 | Jamie Insall | Hibernian | Connah's Quay Nomads | Free |
| 31 May 2017 | Lewis Horner | Inverness Caledonian Thistle | Blyth Spartans | Free |
| 31 May 2017 | Jason Brown | Inverness Caledonian Thistle | Peterhead | Free |
| 31 May 2017 | Lee Lucas | Motherwell | Merthyr Town | Free |
| 31 May 2017 | Stephen Pearson | Motherwell | Retired | Free |
| 31 May 2017 | Michael McMullin | Partick Thistle | Albion Rovers | Free |
| 31 May 2017 | Dominic Docherty | Partick Thistle | Queen's Park | Free |
| 31 May 2017 | Matthew McInally | Partick Thistle | Cowdenbeath | Free |
| 31 May 2017 | Steven Rigg | Queen of the South | Carlisle United | Free |
| 31 May 2017 | Ayrton Sonkur | Queen of the South | Annan Athletic | Free |
| 31 May 2017 | Dean Brotherston | Queen of the South | Sunshine George Cross | Free |
| 31 May 2017 | Bruno Alves | Cagliari | Rangers | Free |
| 31 May 2017 | Andy Webster | St Mirren | Retired | Free |
| 1 June 2017 | Jean-Yves Mvoto | Raith Rovers | Dunfermline Athletic | Free |
| 1 June 2017 | Andy Stirling | Dumbarton | Queen of the South | Free |
| 1 June 2017 | Robert Thomson | Dumbarton | Greenock Morton | Free |
| 1 June 2017 | Ross Brown | East Fife | Livingston | Free |
| 1 June 2017 | Scott Robinson | East Fife | Livingston | Free |
| 1 June 2017 | Billy King | Heart of Midlothian | Dundee United | Free |
| 1 June 2017 | James Keatings | Hibernian | Dundee United | Free |
| 1 June 2017 | Danny Swanson | St Johnstone | Hibernian | Free |
| 1 June 2017 | Ryan Jack | Aberdeen | Rangers | Free |
| 1 June 2017 | David Mitchell | Dundee | Falkirk | Free |
| 1 June 2017 | Efe Ambrose | Celtic | Hibernian | Free |
| 2 June 2017 | Robert McHugh | Falkirk | Greenock Morton | Free |
| 2 June 2017 | Alex Fisher | Inverness Caledonian Thistle | Motherwell | Free |
| 2 June 2017 | Gael Bigirimana | Coventry City | Motherwell | Free |
| 3 June 2017 | Garry Fleming | Dumbarton | Alloa Athletic | Free |
| 5 June 2017 | Craig Tanner | Reading | Motherwell | Free |
| 5 June 2017 | Kyle McClean | Nottingham Forest | St Johnstone | Free |
| 6 June 2017 | Alan Trouten | Brechin City | Albion Rovers | Free |
| 6 June 2017 | Dálcio | Benfica | Rangers | Loan |
| 6 June 2017 | Darren Barr | Dumbarton | Greenock Morton | Free |
| 6 June 2017 | Trevor Carson | Hartlepool United | Motherwell | Free |
| 7 June 2017 | Jack Breslin | Hamilton Academical | Clyde | Freen |
| 7 June 2017 | Jordan Stewart | St Mirren | Clyde | Free |
| 7 June 2017 | Gary Harkins | Ayr United | Greenock Morton | Free |
| 7 June 2017 | Craig Samson | Motherwell | St Mirren | Free |
| 7 June 2017 | Callum Paterson | Heart of Midlothian | Cardiff City | Compensation |
| 7 June 2017 | Fabio Cardoso | Vitoria Setubal | Rangers | £1,300,000 |
| 8 June 2017 | Eoghan O'Connell | Celtic | Bury | Undisclosed |
| 9 June 2017 | Shaun Rooney | York City | Queen of the South | Free |
| 9 June 2017 | Greg Tansey | Inverness Caledonian Thistle | Aberdeen | Free |
| 11 June 2017 | Sean Kelly | AFC Wimbledon | Ross County | Free |
| 11 June 2017 | Daniel Candeias | Benfica | Rangers | Undisclosed |
| 11 June 2017 | Liam Buchanan | Livingston | Raith Rovers | Free |
| 12 June 2017 | Gavin Reilly | Heart of Midlothian | St Mirren | Free |
| 12 June 2017 | Ryan McGeever | Queen's Park | Brechin City | Free |
| 12 June 2017 | Andy Dowie | Queen of the South | Dumbarton | Free |
| 13 June 2017 | Mark Docherty | Dumbarton | East Fife | Free |
| 13 June 2017 | Andy Rose | Coventry City | Motherwell | Free |
| 13 June 2017 | Tam Scobbie | St Johnstone | Dundee United | Free |
| 14 June 2017 | Aidan Smith | Queen of the South | Annan Athletic | Free |
| 14 June 2017 | Josh Peters | Forfar Athletic | Livingston | Free |
| 14 June 2017 | Scott Hooper | Queen of the South | Annan Athletic | Free |
| 14 June 2017 | Luke Leahy | Falkirk | Walsall | Free |
| 14 June 2017 | Scott Allan | Celtic | Dundee | Loan |
| 14 June 2017 | Roarie Deacon | Sutton United | Dundee | Free |
| 14 June 2017 | Mark Stewart | Raith Rovers | Dumbarton | Free |
| 15 June 2017 | Isaac Layne | Grays Athletic | Brechin City | Free |
| 15 June 2017 | Declan McManus | Fleetwood Town | Dunfermline Athletic | Free |
| 15 June 2017 | Aaron Splaine | Kilmarnock | Dunfermline Athletic | Free |
| 15 June 2017 | Rafal Grzelak | Korona Kielce | Heart of Midlothian | Free |
| 15 June 2017 | Blair Spittal | Dundee United | Partick Thistle | Free |
| 15 June 2017 | Jamie Sneddon | Cowdenbeath | Partick Thistle | Free |
| 16 June 2017 | Robby McCrorie | Rangers | Berwick Rangers | Loan |
| 16 June 2017 | Joe Garner | Rangers | Ipswich Town | Undisclosed |
| 17 June 2017 | Jason Cummings | Hibernian | Nottingham Forest | Undisclosed |
| 17 June 2017 | Jonny Hayes | Aberdeen | Celtic | £1,300,000 |
| 17 June 2017 | Ryan Christie | Celtic | Aberdeen | Loan |
| 17 June 2017 | Stefan Scougall | Sheffield United | St Johnstone | Free |
| 18 June 2017 | Euan Spark | Dunfermline Athletic | Brechin City | Free |
| 19 June 2017 | Luis Zwick | Dundee United | Hansa Rostock | Free |
| 19 June 2017 | Alex Harris | Hibernian | Falkirk | Free |
| 19 June 2017 | Alfredo Morelos | HJK Helsinki | Rangers | Undisclosed |
| 20 June 2017 | Liam Boyce | Ross County | Burton Albion | Undisclosed |
| 20 June 2017 | Dylan Mackin | Motherwell | Livingston | Free |
| 21 June 2017 | Russell Griffiths | Everton | Motherwell | Free |
| 21 June 2017 | Keith Lasley | Motherwell | Retired | Free |
| 21 June 2017 | Tom Walsh | Limerick | Dumbarton | Free |
| 22 June 2017 | Lewis Spence | Dunfermline Athletic | Dundee | Free |
| 22 June 2017 | John Baird | Falkirk | Inverness Caledonian Thistle | Free |
| 22 June 2017 | Eduardo Herrera | UNAM | Rangers | Undisclosed |
| 22 June 2017 | Carlos Peña | Guadalajara | Rangers | Undisclosed |
| 22 June 2017 | Liam Lindsay | Partick Thistle | Barnsley | Undisclosed |
| 22 June 2017 | Owen Moxon | Queen of the South | Annan Athletic | Free |
| 22 June 2017 | Lennard Sowah | Heart of Midlothian | KS Cracovia | Free |
| 23 June 2017 | Andy Irving | Heart of Midlothian | Berwick Rangers | Loan |
| 23 June 2017 | Scott Gallacher | Hibernian | Dumbarton | Free |
| 23 June 2017 | Daniel Higgins | Dundee | Kilmarnock | Free |
| 23 June 2017 | Alan Power | Lincoln City | Kilmarnock | Free |
| 23 June 2017 | Paul McMullan | Celtic | Dundee United | Free |
| 23 June 2017 | Craig Barr | Raith Rovers | Dumbarton | Free |
| 24 June 2017 | Nikolay Todorov | Heart of Midlothian | Livingston | Loan |
| 26 June 2017 | David Wilson | Partick Thistle | Dumbarton | Free |
| 27 June 2017 | Greg Stewart | Birmingham City | Aberdeen | Loan |
| 27 June 2017 | Dale Hilson | Queen of the South | St Mirren | Free |
| 28 June 2017 | Juwon Oshaniwa | Heart of Midlothian | Akwa United | Free |
| 28 June 2017 | Kyle Lafferty | Norwich City | Heart of Midlothian | Free |
| 28 June 2017 | Andy Halliday | Rangers | Gabala | Loan |
| 28 June 2017 | Scott Tanser | Port Vale | St Johnstone | Free |
| 28 June 2017 | Randy Wolters | Go Ahead Eagles | Dundee | Free |
| 29 June 2017 | Ofir Marciano | Ashdod | Hibernian | Undisclosed |
| 29 June 2017 | Calum Waters | Alloa Athletic | Kilmarnock | Free |
| 29 June 2017 | Kundai Benyu | Ipswich Town | Celtic | Compensation |
| 30 June 2017 | Aaron Lennox | Aberdeen | Raith Rovers | Free |
| 30 June 2017 | Michael Smith | Peterborough United | Heart of Midlothian | Nominal |
| 30 June 2017 | Ashley Smith-Brown | Manchester City | Heart of Midlothian | Loan |
| 30 June 2017 | Patrick N'Koyi | Sukhothai | Dundee United | Free |
| 30 June 2017 | Seán Dillon | Dundee United | Montrose | Free |
| 30 June 2017 | Charles Dunne | Oldham Athletic | Motherwell | Free |
| 30 June 2017 | Chris Humphrey | Hibernian | Bury | Free |
| 1 July 2017 | Peter Pawlett | Aberdeen | Milton Keynes Dons | Free |
| 1 July 2017 | Rhys McCabe | Dunfermline Athletic | Sligo Rovers | Free |
| 1 July 2017 | Christophe Berra | Ipswich Town | Heart of Midlothian | Free |
| 1 July 2017 | Cole Stockton | Tranmere Rovers | Heart of Midlothian | Free |
| 1 July 2017 | Niall Keown | Reading | Partick Thistle | Undisclosed |
| 2 July 2017 | Gareth Rodger | Brechin City | Edinburgh City | Free |
| 3 July 2017 | Mark Ridgers | Partick Thistle | Inverness Caledonian Thistle | Free |
| 3 July 2017 | George Oakley | AFC Wimbledon | Inverness Caledonian Thistle | Free |
| 3 July 2017 | David McCracken | Falkirk | Peterhead | Free |
| 3 July 2017 | Mark Millar | Livingston | Forfar Athletic | Free |
| 3 July 2017 | Callum Donaldson | Hibernian | Berwick Rangers | Loan |
| 3 July 2017 | Kevin Waugh | Hibernian | Berwick Rangers | Loan |
| 3 July 2017 | Jamie Lindsay | Celtic | Ross County | Loan |
| 3 July 2017 | Jordon Forster | Hibernian | Cheltenham Town | Free |
| 4 July 2017 | Kyle Bradley | Rangers | Clyde | Loan |
| 4 July 2017 | Niall McGinn | Aberdeen | Gwangju | Free |
| 4 July 2017 | Jack Whittaker | Kilmarnock | Cowdenbeath | Free |
| 4 July 2017 | Robbie Buchanan | Heart of Midlothian | Cowdenbeath | Free |
| 4 July 2017 | Stephen O'Donnell | Luton Town | Kilmarnock | Free |
| 4 July 2017 | Thomas Mikkelsen | OB | Ross County | Undisclosed |
| 4 July 2017 | Rory Loy | Dundee | Falkirk | Free |
| 4 July 2017 | Kirk Broadfoot | Rotherham United | Kilmarnock | Free |
| 5 July 2017 | Collin Seedorf | RKC Waalwijk | Inverness Caledonian Thistle | Free |
| 5 July 2017 | Barrie McKay | Rangers | Nottingham Forest | £500,000 |
| 5 July 2017 | Cédric Kipré | Leicester City | Motherwell | Free |
| 5 July 2017 | Jack Hendry | Wigan Athletic | Dundee | Free |
| 5 July 2017 | Ade Azeez | Partick Thistle | Cambridge United | Undisclosed |
| 5 July 2017 | Perry Kitchen | Heart of Midlothian | Randers | Free |
| 5 July 2017 | Ash Taylor | Aberdeen | Northampton Town | Free |
| 6 July 2017 | Lewis Allan | Hibernian | Edinburgh City | Loan |
| 6 July 2017 | Sean Mackie | Hibernian | Edinburgh City | Loan |
| 6 July 2017 | Riccardo Calder | Aston Villa | Inverness Caledonian Thistle | Free |
| 6 July 2017 | Matthew Elsdon | Middlesbrough | Inverness Caledonian Thistle | Loan |
| 6 July 2017 | Graham Dorrans | Norwich City | Rangers | Undisclosed |
| 6 July 2017 | Scott Boden | Inverness Caledonian Thistle | Wrexham | Free |
| 7 July 2017 | Nicky Maynard | Milton Keynes Dons | Aberdeen | Free |
| 7 July 2017 | Saidy Janko | Celtic | Saint-Etienne | Free |
| 7 July 2017 | Chris Johnston | Raith Rovers | Dumbarton | Free |
| 7 July 2017 | Zack Elbouzedi | West Bromwich Albion | Inverness Caledonian Thistle | Free |
| 7 July 2017 | Neil Alexander | Aberdeen | Livingston | Free |
| 7 July 2017 | James Atkinson | Queen of the South | Annan Athletic | Free |
| 9 July 2017 | Logan Bailly | Celtic | Royal Excel Mouscron | Free |
| 10 July 2017 | Henri Anier | Inverness Caledonian Thistle | Lahti | Free |
| 10 July 2017 | Louis Laing | Inverness Caledonian Thistle | Hartlepool United | Free |
| 10 July 2017 | Sam Nicholson | Heart of Midlothian | Minnesota United | Free |
| 10 July 2017 | Robbie Mutch | Aberdeen | Falkirk | Free |
| 11 July 2017 | Aaron Dunsmore | Hibernian | East Fife | Free |
| 12 July 2017 | Olivier Ntcham | Manchester City | Celtic | £4,500,000 |
| 12 July 2017 | Dom Thomas | Motherwell | Kilmarnock | Free |
| 12 July 2017 | Gary Mackay-Steven | Celtic | Aberdeen | Undisclosed |
| 12 July 2017 | Jordie Briels | Fortuna Sittard | Dundee United | Free |
| 12 July 2017 | Craig Watson | Hamilton Academical | East Fife | Free |
| 13 July 2017 | Callumn Morrison | Heart of Midlothian | Stirling Albion | Loan |
| 13 July 2017 | David Ferguson | Motherwell | Ayr United | Free |
| 13 July 2017 | Glen Kamara | Arsenal | Dundee | Free |
| 13 July 2017 | Deniz Mehmet | Port Vale | Dundee United | Free |
| 13 July 2017 | Ian McShane | Ross County | St Mirren | Free |
| 14 July 2017 | Sean Crighton | Livingston | Brechin City | Free |
| 14 July 2017 | Jordan Sinclair | Livingston | Brechin City | Free |
| 14 July 2017 | Kalvin Orsi | St Mirren | Brechin City | Free |
| 14 July 2017 | Joe Chalmers | Motherwell | Inverness Caledonian Thistle | Free |
| 14 July 2017 | Xavier Tomas | Lausanne-Sport | Hamilton Academical | Undisclosed |
| 14 July 2017 | Sofien Moussa | Lokomotiv Gorna Oryahovitsa | Dundee | Free |
| 14 July 2017 | Ben Gordon | St Mirren | East Fife | Free |
| 14 July 2017 | Nathan Flanagan | St Mirren | East Fife | Loan |
| 14 July 2017 | Kári Árnason | Omonia Nicosia | Aberdeen | Free |
| 14 July 2017 | Alex Samizadeh | Bolton Wanderers | Kilmarnock | Free |
| 14 July 2017 | Harry Lewis | Southampton | Dundee United | Loan |
| 15 July 2017 | Steven Whittaker | Norwich City | Hibernian | Free |
| 15 July 2017 | Sam Stanton | Hibernian | Dundee United | Loan |
| 15 July 2017 | Ben Richards-Everton | Dunfermline Athletic | Accrington Stanley | Free |
| 15 July 2017 | Dougie Hill | Brechin City | Dumbarton | Free |
| 15 July 2017 | Christopher McLaughlin | Ross County | Dumbarton | Free |
| 17 July 2017 | Mark Foden | Ross County | Stirling Albion | Loan |
| 17 July 2017 | Dean Shiels | Edmonton | Dunfermline Athletic | Free |
| 17 July 2017 | Craig Clay | Motherwell | Leyton Orient | Free |
| 17 July 2017 | Felitciano Zschusschen | Saarbrücken | Inverness Caledonian Thistle | Free |
| 18 July 2017 | Ryan Fulton | Liverpool | Hamilton Academical | Free |
| 18 July 2017 | Matt Crooks | Rangers | Northampton Town | Undisclosed |
| 18 July 2017 | Chris Burke | Ross County | Kilmarnock | Free |
| 18 July 2017 | Ally Roy | Heart of Midlothian | Dumbarton | Loan |
| 19 July 2017 | Deivydas Matulevičius | Royal Excel Mouscron | Hibernian | Free |
| 20 July 2017 | Calum Hall | Hibernian | Edinburgh City | Free |
| 20 July 2017 | Jim O'Brien | Shrewsbury Town | Ross County | Free |
| 20 July 2017 | Elliot Parish | Accrington Stanley | Dundee | Free |
| 21 July 2017 | Emilio Izaguirre | Celtic | Al-Fayha | £1,250,000 |
| 21 July 2017 | Kyle Hutton | St Mirren | Dumbarton | Free |
| 21 July 2017 | Connor McLaren | St Johnstone | Montrose | Free |
| 21 July 2017 | David Hutton | Dunfermline Athletic | Arbroath | Free |
| 21 July 2017 | Connor McManus | Celtic | Greenock Morton | Free |
| 21 July 2017 | Alex Cooper | East Fife | Inverness Caledonian Thistle | Free |
| 22 July 2017 | David Brownlie | Ross County | Airdrieonians | Free |
| 22 July 2017 | Joe Nuttall | Aberdeen | Blackburn Rovers | Free |
| 24 July 2017 | George Newell | Bolton Wanderers | Motherwell | Free |
| 25 July 2017 | Michael Coulson | St Johnstone | Scarborough Athletic | Free |
| 25 July 2017 | Billy Mckay | Wigan Athletic | Ross County | Undisclosed |
| 25 July 2017 | Scott McDonald | Motherwell | Dundee United | Free |
| 26 July 2017 | Vykintas Slivka | Juventus | Hibernian | Undisclosed |
| 26 July 2017 | Nathan Tyson | Kilmarnock | Wycombe Wanderers | Free |
| 26 July 2017 | Karleigh Osborne | Kilmarnock | Grimsby Town | Free |
| 27 July 2017 | Jay McEveley | Ross County | Tranmere Rovers | Free |
| 28 July 2017 | Lee Erwin | Leeds United | Kilmarnock | Free |
| 28 July 2017 | Danny Handling | Hibernian | Dumbarton | Free |
| 28 July 2017 | Connor Randall | Liverpool | Heart of Midlothian | Loan |
| 28 July 2017 | Jack Iredale | Perth Glory | Greenock Morton | Free |
| 29 July 2017 | Alexandros Tziolis | Heart of Midlothian | Al-Fayha | Free |
| 29 July 2017 | Michael O'Halloran | Rangers | St Johnstone | Loan |
| 29 July 2017 | Connor Bell | Servette | Inverness Caledonian Thistle | Free |
| 29 July 2017 | Paul Dixon | Dundee United | Grimsby Town | Free |
| 31 July 2017 | Jamie McDonagh | Greenock Morton | Sligo Rovers | Free |
| 31 July 2017 | Bjorn Johnsen | Heart of Midlothian | ADO Den Haag | Undisclosed |
| 31 July 2017 | Jordan Turnbull | Coventry City | Partick Thistle | Loan |
| 31 July 2017 | Gordon Greer | Blackburn Rovers | Kilmarnock | Free |
| 1 August 2017 | Harry Davis | Crewe Alexandra | St Mirren | Free |
| 1 August 2017 | Sam Wardrop | Celtic | Dumbarton | Loan |
| 2 August 2017 | Ellis Plummer | Manchester City | Motherwell | Free |
| 2 August 2017 | Anthony Stokes | Blackburn Rovers | Hibernian | Free |
| 3 August 2017 | Fraser Aird | Falkirk | Dunfermline Athletic | Free |
| 3 August 2017 | Rob Kiernan | Rangers | Southend United | Undisclosed |
| 4 August 2017 | Cammy Bell | Dundee United | Kilmarnock | Free |
| 4 August 2017 | Milan Nitrianský | Slovan Liberec | Partick Thistle | Free |
| 4 August 2017 | Fraser Fyvie | Hibernian | Dundee United | Free |
| 4 August 2017 | Ben Stirling | Hibernian | Cowdenbeath | Loan |
| 4 August 2017 | Callum Crane | Hibernian | Alloa Athletic | Loan |
| 4 August 2017 | Greg Hurst | St Johnstone | East Fife | Loan |
| 7 August 2017 | Martyn Waghorn | Rangers | Ipswich Town | Undisclosed |
| 7 August 2017 | Philippe Senderos | Rangers | Houston Dynamo | Free |
| 7 August 2017 | Coll Donaldson | Dundee United | Inverness Caledonian Thistle | Free |
| 8 August 2017 | Charlie Telfer | Dundee United | Almere City | Free |
| 8 August 2017 | Jacob Blyth | Motherwell | Barrow | Free |
| 9 August 2017 | Ross Draper | Inverness Caledonian Thistle | Ross County | £100,000 |
| 10 August 2017 | Chris Kane | St Johnstone | Queen of the South | Loan |
| 10 August 2017 | Jason Kerr | St Johnstone | Queen of the South | Loan |
| 10 August 2017 | Darryl Duffy | Mohun Bagan | St Mirren | Free |
| 10 August 2017 | Brian Graham | Hibernian | Cheltenham Town | Free |
| 10 August 2017 | Leo Fasan | Celtic | Bury | Free |
| 10 August 2017 | Stevie May | Preston North End | Aberdeen | Undisclosed |
| 11 August 2017 | Miles Storey | Aberdeen | Partick Thistle | Undisclosed |
| 11 August 2017 | Conor Sammon | Heart of Midlothian | Partick Thistle | Loan |
| 12 August 2017 | Paul Quinn | Ross County | Dundee United | Free |
| 14 August 2017 | Stephen McManus | Motherwell | Retired | Free |
| 14 August 2017 | Liam Smith | Heart of Midlothian | St Mirren | Loan |
| 15 August 2017 | Andy Ryan | Airdrieonians | Dunfermline Athletic | Undisclosed |
| 17 August 2017 | Jonathan Franks | Ross County | Hartlepool United | Free |
| 17 August 2017 | Brandon Barker | Manchester City | Hibernian | Loan |
| 18 August 2017 | James Penrice | Partick Thistle | Livingston | Loan |
| 18 August 2017 | Josh Meekings | Inverness Caledonian Thistle | Dundee | Free |
| 18 August 2017 | Rohan Ferguson | Airdrieonians | Motherwell | Undisclosed |
| 18 August 2017 | Rohan Ferguson | Motherwell | Airdrieonians | Loan |
| 18 August 2017 | Luke Watt | Motherwell | Airdrieonians | Loan |
| 18 August 2017 | Jake Hastie | Motherwell | Airdrieonians | Loan |
| 18 August 2017 | Eamonn Brophy | Hamilton Academical | Kilmarnock | Free |
| 18 August 2017 | Brad Spencer | Houston Dynamo | Kilmarnock | Free |
| 18 August 2017 | Ryan Tierney | Hamilton Academical | Airdrieonians | Loan |
| 21 August 2017 | Nadir Çiftçi | Celtic | Plymouth Argyle | Loan |
| 22 August 2017 | Deimantas Petravičius | Zagłębie Lubin | Motherwell | Free |
| 23 August 2017 | Harry Forrester | Rangers | AFC Wimbledon | Loan |
| 24 August 2017 | Denny Johnstone | Colchester United | St Johnstone | Loan |
| 24 August 2017 | Aaron Nemane | Manchester City | Rangers | Loan |
| 25 August 2017 | Keith Watson | St Johnstone | Hartlepool United | Loan |
| 25 August 2017 | Jon McLaughlin | Burton Albion | Heart of Midlothian | Free |
| 25 August 2017 | Stuart Findlay | Newcastle United | Kilmarnock | Loan |
| 25 August 2017 | PJ Crossan | Celtic | Alloa Athletic | Loan |
| 28 August 2017 | Patrick Roberts | Manchester City | Celtic | Loan |
| 30 August 2017 | Jon Aurtenetxe | Amorebieta | Dundee | Free |
| 30 August 2017 | Greg Morrison | Ross County | Dumbarton | Loan |
| 31 August 2017 | Ross Callachan | Raith Rovers | Heart of Midlothian | Undisclosed |
| 31 August 2017 | David Milinković | Genoa | Heart of Midlothian | Loan |
| 31 August 2017 | Declan John | Cardiff City | Rangers | Loan |
| 31 August 2017 | Jayden Stockley | Aberdeen | Exeter City | £100,000 |
| 31 August 2017 | Paul McGinn | Chesterfield | Partick Thistle | Free |
| 31 August 2017 | Jordan McGhee | Heart of Midlothian | Falkirk | Undisclosed |
| 31 August 2017 | Conrad Balatoni | Ayr United | Falkirk | Free |
| 31 August 2017 | Paolo Buzzi | Monza | Hamilton Academical | Undisclosed |
| 31 August 2017 | Antonio Rojano | Real Potosí | Hamilton Academical | Undisclosed |
| 31 August 2017 | Botti Biabi | Swansea City | Hamilton Academical | Loan |
| 31 August 2017 | Dimitris Froxylias | Ermis Aradippou | Dumbarton | Free |
| 31 August 2017 | Aidan Keena | St Patrick's Athletic | Heart of Midlothian | Free |
| 31 August 2017 | Eoghan McCawl | St Johnstone | Glentoran | Free |
| 31 August 2017 | Dylan Bikey | Heart of Midlothian | Doxa Katokopias | Free |
| 31 August 2017 | Andraž Struna | Heart of Midlothian | New York City | Free |
| 31 August 2017 | Connor McLennan | Aberdeen | Brechin City | Loan |
| 31 August 2017 | Bruce Anderson | Aberdeen | Elgin City | Loan |
| 31 August 2017 | Mark Lamont | Partick Thistle | Clyde | Loan |
| 31 August 2017 | Paul Allan | Dunfermline Athletic | Stenhousemuir | Loan |
| 31 August 2017 | Dario Zanatta | Heart of Midlothian | Raith Rovers | Loan |
| 31 August 2017 | P. J. Morrison | Motherwell | Clyde | Loan |
| 31 August 2017 | Ben Heneghan | Motherwell | Sheffield United | Undisclosed |
| 31 August 2017 | A-Jay Leitch-Smith | Shrewsbury Town | Dundee | Loan |
| 31 August 2017 | Aidan Nesbitt | Celtic | Milton Keynes Dons | Undisclosed |
| 31 August 2017 | Liam Grimshaw | Preston North End | Motherwell | Free |
| 31 August 2017 | Peter Hartley | Blackpool | Motherwell | Loan |
| 31 August 2017 | Jack McMillan | Motherwell | Livingston | Loan |
| 31 August 2017 | Andrew Blake | Hibernian | Edinburgh City | Loan |
| 31 August 2017 | Jack Iredale | Greenock Morton | Queen's Park | Loan |
| 31 August 2017 | Marcus Godinho | Heart of Midlothian | Berwick Rangers | Loan |
| 31 August 2017 | Odsonne Édouard | Paris Saint-Germain | Celtic | Loan |
| 31 August 2017 | Joe Dodoo | Rangers | Charlton Athletic | Loan |
| 31 August 2017 | Dominic Ball | Rotherham United | Aberdeen | Loan |
| 31 August 2017 | Joe Piggott | Rochdale | Dundee United | Undisclosed |

== See also ==
- List of Scottish football transfers winter 2016–17
- List of Scottish football transfers winter 2017–18
