= 2017–18 Scottish Challenge Cup =

Tournament details
- Country: Scotland
- Teams: 56

Final positions
- Champions: Inverness Caledonian Thistle
- Runners-up: Dumbarton

Tournament statistics
- Matches played: 55
- Goals scored: 169 (3.07 per match)
- Top goal scorer(s): Stephen Dobbie & Lewis Vaughan (4 goals)

The 2017–18 Scottish Challenge Cup, known as the IRN-BRU Cup due to sponsorship reasons, is the 27th season of the competition. The tournament took on a similar format from the previous season, however, two teams from the Republic of Ireland's Airtricity League (Sligo Rovers and Bray Wanderers) entered the competition for the first time taking the total number of participating clubs to 56. This was the second season with two clubs from both Northern Ireland and Wales competing alongside the 30 members of the 2017–18 Scottish Championship, 2017–18 Scottish League One and 2017–18 Scottish League Two, four teams from the 2017–18 Highland Football League and four from the 2017–18 Lowland Football League as well as the Under-20 teams of the teams competing in the 2017–18 Scottish Premiership. The Welsh teams were The New Saints and Connah's Quay Nomads while the Northern Irish teams were Crusaders and Linfield.

Dundee United were the defending champions after they beat St Mirren 2–1 in the 2017 final, but lost 2–1 in the Quarter-finals to Crusaders.

Irn Bru replaced Petrofac as the main sponsor of the competition in June 2016.

== Format ==
Round	Date	Fixtures	Clubs	New entries
First round	15–16 August 2017	24	56 → 32	Teams placed 3rd–10th from 2016–17 Scottish Championship; 10 teams from 2016–17 Scottish League One; 10 teams from 2016–17 Scottish League Two; 4 teams from 2016–17 Highland Football League; 4 teams from 2016–17 Lowland Football League; 12 U20s teams from 2017–18 Scottish Premiership
Second round	2–3 September 2017	16	32 → 16	12th placed team from 2016–17 Scottish Premiership; 2nd placed team from 2016–17 Scottish Championship; 2 teams from 2016–17 NIFL Premiership; 2 teams from 2016–17 Welsh Premier League; 2 teams from 2017 League of Ireland Premier Division
Third round	7–8 October 2017	8	16 → 8	
Quarter-finals	11–12 November 2017	4	8 → 4	
Semi-finals	17–18 February 2018	2	4 → 2	
Final	24 or 25 March 2018	1	2 → 1	

== First round ==
The draw for the first round was made at 1 pm on 27 June 2017 at the Summerlee Industrial Museum in Coatbridge and was streamed live on the SPFL's Facebook page. The draw was regionalised into northern and southern sections with each section containing 14 SPFL clubs, four Highland Football League or Lowland Football League clubs and six U20s teams with any team able to face any other within their section.

=== North Section ===
==== Draw ====
Teams in Bold advanced to the second round.

North section

01. **Alloa Athletic**
02. Arbroath
03. Brechin City
04. Cowdenbeath
05. **Dundee United**
06. **Dunfermline Athletic**

07. East Fife
08. **Elgin City**
09. Forfar Athletic
10. **Montrose**
11. **Peterhead**
12. **Raith Rovers**

13. Stenhousemuir
14. Stirling Albion
15. **Aberdeen U20s**
16. Dundee U20s
17. **Heart of Midlothian U20s**
18. Hibernian U20s

19. **Ross County U20s**
20. St Johnstone U20s
21. Brora Rangers
22. **Buckie Thistle**
23. **Cove Rangers**
24. Formartine United

==== Matches ====
15 August 2017	**Ross County U20s**	**2–1**	Forfar Athletic	Dingwall, Scotland
19:30	Mckay 25'; MacIver 27'	Report	Millar 89'	Stadium: Victoria Park; Referee: Billy Baxter

15 August 2017	**Aberdeen U20s**	**1–0**	St Johnstone U20s	Brechin, Scotland
19:45	Ross 42'	Report		Stadium: Glebe Park; Attendance: 155; Referee: Alex Shepherd

15 August 2017	Stirling Albion	**1–3**	**Montrose**	Stirling, Scotland
19:45	Smith 90'	Report	Steeves 45'; Ballantyne 56', 85'	Stadium: Forthbank Stadium; Attendance: 413; Referee: Peter Stuart

15 August 2017	**Dundee United**	**2–0**	Cowdenbeath	Dundee, Scotland
19:45	N'Koyi 61', 67'	Report		Stadium: Tannadice Park; Attendance: 1,655; Referee: Mat Northcroft

15 August 2017	Formartine United	**2–3** (a.e.t.)	**Heart of Midlothian U20s**	Pitmedden, Scotland
19:45	MacPhee 17'; Berton 35'	Report	Zanatta 50', 90+2'; Paton 119'	Stadium: North Lodge Park; Attendance: 200; Referee: Dan McFarlane

15 August 2017	East Fife	**0–2**	**Peterhead**	Methil, Scotland
19:45		Report	Lawrence 2'; Adams 64'	Stadium: Bayview Stadium; Attendance: 333; Referee: Mike Roncone

15 August 2017	Stenhousemuir	**0–2**	**Cove Rangers**	Stenhousemuir, Scotland
19:45		Report	R Dunlop 19' (o.g.); Megginson 36' (pen.)	Stadium: Ochilview Park; Attendance: 169; Referee: Scott Lambie

15 August 2017	**Raith Rovers**	**3–0**	Brora Rangers	Kirkcaldy, Scotland
19:45	Callachan 16'; Vaughan 65'; Osei 84'	Report		Stadium: Stark's Park; Attendance: 971; Referee: Steven Reid

15 August 2017	**Dunfermline Athletic**	**2–0**	Arbroath	Dunfermline, Scotland
19:45	Ryan 24', 40'	Report		Stadium: East End Park; Attendance: 1,462; Referee: Euan Anderson

15 August 2017	Hibernian U20s	**1–2**	**Elgin City**	Edinburgh, Scotland
19:45	Murray 48'	Report	McLeish 19'; Bronsky 89'	Stadium: Ainslie Park; Attendance: 387; Referee: Alan Newlands

15 August 2017	**Buckie Thistle**	**2–1**	Brechin City	Buckie, Scotland
20:00	Fraser 56', 82'	Report	McLean 14'	Stadium: Victoria Park; Attendance: 453; Referee: Graham Beaton

16 August 2017	Dundee U20s	**2–4**	**Alloa Athletic**	Dundee, Scotland
19:30	Henvey 40', 79'	Report	Malcolm 13', 90+1'; Crane 21'; Flannigan 33'	Stadium: Dens Park; Attendance: 110; Referee: Stephen Brown

=== South Section ===
==== Draw ====
Teams in Bold advanced to the second round.

South section

25. Airdrieonians
26. Albion Rovers
27. **Annan Athletic**
28. **Berwick Rangers**
29. **Ayr United**
30. Clyde

31. **Dumbarton**
32. Edinburgh City
33. **Livingston**
34. Greenock Morton
35. **Queen of the South**
36. Queen's Park

37. **St Mirren**
38. **Stranraer**
39. Celtic U20s
40. **Hamilton Academical U20s**
41. Kilmarnock U20s
42. **Motherwell U20s**

43. **Partick Thistle U20s**
44. Rangers U20s
45. East Kilbride
46. East Stirlingshire
47. **Spartans**
48. Stirling University

==== Matches ====
15 August 2017	Kilmarnock U20s	**0–2**	**Berwick Rangers**	Kilmarnock, Scotland
19:45		Report	Thomson 19'; McKenna 39'	Stadium: Rugby Park; Referee: Duncan Williams

15 August 2017	Clyde	**2–3** (a.e.t.)	**Stranraer**	Cumbernauld, Scotland
19:45	McNiff 2'; Osadolor 48'	Report	Agnew 66' (pen.); Stewart 70' (o.g.); Wallace 103'	Stadium: Broadwood Stadium; Attendance: 319; Referee: Grant Irvine

15 August 2017	**Hamilton Academical U20s**	**1–0**	Edinburgh City	Hamilton, Scotland
19:45	Tierney 4' (pen.)	Report		Stadium: New Douglas Park; Attendance: 153; Referee: Lloyd Wilson

15 August 2017	Albion Rovers	**0–3** **(Awarded)**	**Spartans**	Coatbridge, Scotland
19:45		Report		Stadium: Cliftonhill; Attendance: 155; Referee: Kevin Graham
	**Penalties**
	Michael McMullin (penalty missed); McLaughlin (penalty scored); Jamie Gallagher (penalty scored); Trouten (penalty scored); Fisher (penalty scored); Marr (penalty scored)		(penalty scored) Ross Allum; (penalty scored) Ian McFarland; (penalty missed) Michael Herd; (penalty scored) Adam Corbett; (penalty scored) Jamie Dishington; (penalty missed) Dachi Khutsishvili

15 August 2017	**St Mirren**	**2–1**	East Kilbride	Paisley, Scotland
19:45	Stewart 87'; Morgan 90+2'	Report	McLaren 81'	Stadium: St Mirren Park; Attendance: 1,357; Referee: John McKendrick

15 August 2017	**Partick Thistle U20s**	**6–1**	Stirling University	Glasgow, Scotland
19:45	McLaughlin 15', 57', 79'; Lamont 52'; Nisbet 60'; Fitzpatrick 67'	Report	Lyons 75'	Stadium: Firhill Stadium; Referee: Stewart Luke

15 August 2017	**Queen of the South**	**4–0**	Airdrieonians	Dumfries, Scotland
19:45	Lyle 14'; Kerr 25'; Brownlie 44'; Rooney 88'	Report		Stadium: Palmerston Park; Attendance: 1,012; Referee: Barry Cook

15 August 2017	Greenock Morton	**0–2**	**Livingston**	Greenock, Scotland
19:45		Report	Todorov 25'; Mullen 70'	Stadium: Cappielow; Attendance: 1,036; Referee: Colin Steven

15 August 2017	**Annan Athletic**	**3–1**	Celtic U20s	Annan, Scotland
19:45	Smith 17', 23' (pen.), 84'	Report	Hendry 30'	Stadium: Galabank; Attendance: 278; Referee: Chris Graham

16 August 2017	**Motherwell U20s**	**2–1**	Queen's Park	Stirling, Scotland
19:30	Plummer 62'; Gordon 69'	Report	Cummins 29'	Stadium: Forthbank Stadium; Attendance: 168; Referee: David Dickinson

16 August 2017	**Dumbarton**	**2–1**	Rangers U20s	Dumbarton, Scotland
19:45	Gallagher 2' (pen.); Stewart 49'	Report	Hardie 72'	Stadium: Dumbarton Football Stadium; Attendance: 389; Referee: Gavin Ross

16 August 2017	East Stirlingshire	**1–5**	**Ayr United**	Stenhousemuir, Scotland
19:45	Ure 40'	Report	Murphy 26'; Gilmour 38'; Moore 54'; Forrest 58'; McCowan 88'	Stadium: Ochilview Park; Attendance: 318; Referee: David Munro

Notes

1. A-Spartans were awarded a 3–0 win against Albion Rovers at a disciplinary hearing on 24 August 2017. Albion Rovers pleaded guilty to fielding Liam McGuigan as a second half substitute when he was ineligible to play in the match. The match had ended 0–0 with Albion Rovers winning 5–4 on penalties. Albion Rovers were also fined £2,000 for the breach of IRN-BRU Cup regulations. Both teams were included in the draw for the second round on 17 August 2017.

== Second round ==
=== Draw ===
The draw for the second round was made at 1 pm on 17 August 2017 at the Falkirk Wheel and streamed live on the SPFL's Facebook page. The draw was unseeded but the six non-Scottish teams were kept apart with one team from each country drawn at home and one away. Linfield were allocated an away tie due to the unavailability of Windsor Park so Crusaders played at home.

Teams in Italics were not known at the time of the draw. Teams in Bold advanced to the third round.

(Republic of Ireland) Premier Division	(Northern Ireland) NIFL Premiership	(Wales) Welsh Premier League	(Scotland) SPFL	Other Scottish
01. Sligo Rovers; 02. Bray Wanderers	03. **Linfield**; 04. **Crusaders**	05. **The New Saints**; 06. Connah's Quay Nomads	07. **Inverness Caledonian Thistle**; 08. **Falkirk**; 09. **Dundee United**; 10. **Dunfermline Athletic**; 11. **Queen of the South**; 12. **St Mirren**; 13. **Dumbarton**; 14. **Raith Rovers**; 15. Ayr United; 16. Livingston; 17. Alloa Athletic; 18. **Stranraer**; 19. Spartans; 20. **Peterhead**; 21. Annan Athletic; 22. **Montrose**; 23. **Elgin City**; 24. Berwick Rangers	Premiership U20s; 25. Ross County U20s; 26. Hamilton Academical U20s; 27. Motherwell U20s; 28. Partick Thistle U20s; 29. Aberdeen U20s; 30. Heart of Midlothian U20s; Highland Football League; 31. Buckie Thistle; 32. **Cove Rangers**

=== Matches ===
29 August 2017	Ayr United	**1–1** (a.e.t.) (**5–6** p)	**Montrose**	Ayr, Scotland
19:45	Moore 29'	Report	I Campbell 3'	Stadium: Somerset Park; Attendance: 906; Referee: Grant Irvine
	**Penalties**
	Rose (penalty scored); Gilmour (penalty missed); McGuffie (penalty scored); Moore (penalty scored); Forrest (penalty scored); Geggan (penalty scored); Higgins (penalty missed)		(penalty scored) I Campbell; (penalty scored) Steeves; (penalty scored) Callaghan; (penalty missed) Allan; (penalty scored) Ferguson; (penalty scored) Millar; (penalty scored) McLaren

1 September 2017	**Stranraer**	**2–0**	Partick Thistle U20s	Stranraer, Scotland
19:45	Wallace 33'; Stoney 90+1'	Report		Stadium: Stair Park; Attendance: 228; Referee: Steven Reid

2 September 2017	**Dumbarton**	**2–1** (a.e.t.)	Connah's Quay Nomads	Dumbarton, Scotland
14:30	Wilson 81'; Froxylias 120'	Report	Morris 26' (pen.)	Stadium: Dumbarton Football Stadium; Attendance: 491; Referee: Ben Connolly

2 September 2017	**Elgin City**	**2–0**	Bray Wanderers	Elgin, Scotland
15:00	Dodd 45'; Allan 90+2'	Report		Stadium: Borough Briggs; Attendance: 611; Referee: Arnold Hunter

2 September 2017	**Crusaders**	**3–2**	Motherwell U20s	Belfast, Northern Ireland
15:00	Lowry 28'; Burns 84', 90+2'	Report	Turnbull 51'; Newell 67'	Stadium: Seaview; Attendance: 494; Referee: Kris Hames

2 September 2017	Spartans	**1–2**	**Linfield**	Edinburgh, Scotland
15:00	Atkinson 74'	Report	Rooney 39' (pen.); Lowry 49'	Stadium: Ainslie Park; Attendance: 902; Referee: Mark Petch

2 September 2017	**Peterhead**	**2–0**	Annan Athletic	Peterhead, Scotland
15:00	McLean 59' (pen.); McAllister 78'	Report		Stadium: Balmoor Stadium; Attendance: 529; Referee: Craig Napier

2 September 2017	**Dundee United**	**3–1**	Alloa Athletic	Dundee, Scotland
15:00	N'Koyi 72'; McMullan 90+1'; Flood 90+3'	Report	Cawley 78'	Stadium: Tannadice Park; Attendance: 1,763; Referee: Willie Collum

2 September 2017	Berwick Rangers	**0–5**	**Queen of the South**	Berwick-upon-Tweed, England
15:00		Report	Rooney 53'; Dobbie 58', 63'; Lyle 60'; Kane 87'	Stadium: Shielfield Park; Attendance: 621; Referee: Greg Aitken

2 September 2017	**St Mirren**	**3–1**	Heart of Midlothian U20s	Paisley, Scotland
15:00	Reilly 8', 48'; Sutton 83'	Report	Currie 81'	Stadium: St Mirren Park; Attendance: 1,130; Referee: Craig Charleston

2 September 2017	Hamilton Academical U20s	**1–3**	**Cove Rangers**	Hamilton, Scotland
15:00	Breen 54'	Report	Masson 14'; Megginson 27' (pen.), 30'	Stadium: New Douglas Park; Attendance: 297; Referee: David Munro

2 September 2017	Aberdeen U20s	**2–4**	**Inverness Caledonian Thistle**	Brechin, Scotland
15:00	Ross 51'; Anderson 89'	Report	Calder 4'; Polworth 25'; Raven 40'; Tremarco 82'	Stadium: Glebe Park; Attendance: 175; Referee: Alan Newlands

2 September 2017	Buckie Thistle	**0–3**	**Dunfermline Athletic**	Buckie, Scotland
15:00		Report	Clark 7', 35'; Ryan 39'	Stadium: Victoria Park; Attendance: 606; Referee: Mike Roncone

2 September 2017	**Raith Rovers**	**4–0**	Ross County U20s	Kirkcaldy, Scotland
15:00	Vaughan 7', 21'; Barr 10'; Buchanan 27'	Report		Stadium: Stark's Park; Attendance: 1,035; Referee: Gavin Ross

2 September 2017	Sligo Rovers	**1–2**	**Falkirk**	Sligo, Ireland
19:45	Sharkey 18'	Report	Austin 9'; Craigen 28'	Stadium: The Showgrounds; Attendance: 520; Referee: Keith Kennedy

3 September 2017	**The New Saints**	**1–1** (a.e.t.) (**6–5** p)	Livingston	Oswestry, England
14:45	Edwards 20'	Report	Mackin 64'	Stadium: Park Hall; Attendance: 403; Referee: Robert Harvey
	**Penalties**
	Mullan (penalty scored); Draper (penalty scored); Brobbel (penalty missed); Seargeant (penalty scored); Spender (penalty missed); Rawlinson (penalty scored); Routledge (penalty scored); Harrison (penalty scored)		(penalty missed) Mackin; (penalty scored) Todorov; (penalty scored) Halkett; (penalty missed) Lithgow; (penalty scored) Gallagher; (penalty scored) Longridge; (penalty scored) Mullin; (penalty missed) Pittman

The SPFL launched an investigation after two different methods of penalty shootout were used in the second round matches that required the tiebreaker. Montrose's 6–5 win over Ayr United used the traditional ABAB method where one team follows the other whereas The New Saints' 6–5 win over Livingston used the trial ABBA method where one team goes first before the other takes two consecutively and then the first team takes their second. SPFL rules state that the ABAB method should be used. The mix up is suspected to have come after confusion between the Irish referee and Welsh linesmen in The New Saints-Livingston match over which method was to be used. The result of the investigation is not expected to impact the result of The New Saints-Livingston tie.

== Third round ==
=== Draw ===
The draw for the third round was made at 1 pm on 5 September 2017 at the Riverside Museum and was streamed live on the SPFL's Facebook page. The draw was unseeded and there were no longer any requirements for non-SPFL sides to be kept apart.

Teams in Bold advanced to the third round.

(Northern Ireland) NIFL Premiership	(Wales) Welsh Premier League	(Scotland) SPFL	(Scotland) Highland Football League
01. Linfield; 02. **Crusaders**	03. **The New Saints**	04. **Inverness Caledonian Thistle**; 05. **Falkirk**; 06. **Dundee United**; 07. Dunfermline Athletic; 08. **Queen of the South**; 09. St Mirren; 10. **Dumbarton**; 11. **Raith Rovers**; 12. Stranraer; 13. Peterhead; 14. Montrose; 15. Elgin City	16. Cove Rangers

=== Matches ===
6 October 2017	**Dumbarton**	**2–1**	Stranraer	Dumbarton, Scotland
19:45	Barr 12'; Stewart 65'	Report	Okoh 90'	Stadium: Dumbarton Football Stadium; Attendance: 492; Referee: Greg Aitken

7 October 2017	St Mirren	**1–3**	**Raith Rovers**	Paisley, Scotland
15:00	Reilly 63'	Report	Vaughan 64'; Spence 73'; Barr 81'	Stadium: St Mirren Park; Attendance: 1,970; Referee: Euan Anderson

7 October 2017	Montrose	**1–3** (a.e.t.)	**Queen of the South**	Montrose, Scotland
15:00	Masson 23'	Report	Dobbie 87', 120'; Dykes 113'	Stadium: Links Park; Attendance: 534; Referee: Kevin Graham

7 October 2017	**Falkirk**	**2–0**	Dunfermline Athletic	Falkirk, Scotland
15:00	Balatoni 19'; Hippolyte 59'	Report		Stadium: Falkirk Stadium; Attendance: 4,082; Referee: Steven McLean

7 October 2017	Cove Rangers	**0–3**	**Crusaders**	Forfar, Scotland
15:00		Report	Carvill 45'; Glackin 60'; Caddell 90'	Stadium: Station Park; Attendance: 268; Referee: Paul McLaughlin

7 October 2017	**Inverness Caledonian Thistle**	**3–0**	Peterhead	Inverness, Scotland
15:00	Polworth 2'; Calder 51'; MacKay 90'	Report		Stadium: Caledonian Stadium; Attendance: 930; Referee: Alan Muir

7 October 2017	**The New Saints**	**4–0**	Elgin City	Oswestry, England
16:30	Draper 17', 61'; Edwards 39'; Mullan 44'	Report		Stadium: Park Hall; Attendance: 404; Referee: Andrew Davey

7 October 2017	**Dundee United**	**1–0**	Linfield	Dundee, Scotland
17:15	Chalmers 90'	Report		Stadium: Tannadice Park; Attendance: 1,967; Referee: Iwan Griffith

== Quarter-finals ==
=== Draw ===
The draw for the quarter-finals was made at 1 pm on 10 October 2017 at the Forth Road Bridge Visitor Centre and was streamed live on the SPFL's Facebook page. The draw was unseeded.

Teams in Bold advanced to the semi-finals.

(Northern Ireland) NIFL Premiership	(Wales) Welsh Premier League	(Scotland) SPFL
01. **Crusaders**	02. **The New Saints**	03. **Inverness Caledonian Thistle**; 04. Falkirk; 05. Dundee United; 06. Queen of the South; 07. **Dumbarton**; 08. Raith Rovers

=== Matches ===
11 November 2017	Dundee United	**1–2**	**Crusaders**	Dundee, Scotland
13:15	Fyvie 55'	Report	Cushley 67'; Whyte 90+1'	Stadium: Tannadice Park; Attendance: 2,048; Referee: Robert Hennessy

11 November 2017	**Dumbarton**	**2–0**	Raith Rovers	Dumbarton, Scotland
15:00	McLaughlin 20'; Roy 49'	Report		Stadium: Dumbarton Football Stadium; Attendance: 888; Referee: Gavin Duncan

11 November 2017	**Inverness Caledonian Thistle**	**1–0**	Falkirk	Inverness, Scotland
17:15	Bell 57'	Report		Stadium: Caledonian Stadium; Attendance: 1,078; Referee: Euan Anderson

12 November 2017	**The New Saints**	**0–0** (a.e.t.) (**4–3** p)	Queen of the South	Oswestry, England
14:45		Report		Stadium: Park Hall; Attendance: 808; Referee: Raymond Crangle
	**Penalties**
	Mullan (penalty missed); Brobbel (penalty missed); Seargeant (penalty scored); Darlington (penalty scored); Fletcher (penalty scored); Harrison (penalty scored)		(penalty missed) Lyle; (penalty missed) Dobbie; (penalty scored) Jacobs; (penalty scored) McFadden; (penalty scored) Fordyce; (penalty missed) Stirling

== Semi-finals ==
=== Draw ===
The draw for the semi-finals was made at 1pm on 14 November 2017 at the SEC Armadillo and was streamed live on the SPFL's Facebook page. The draw was unseeded.

Teams in Bold advanced to the final.

(Northern Ireland) NIFL Premiership	(Wales) Welsh Premier League	(Scotland) SPFL
01. Crusaders	02. The New Saints	03. **Inverness Caledonian Thistle**; 04. **Dumbarton**

=== Matches ===
17 February 2018	The New Saints	**1–2**	**Dumbarton**	Oswestry, England
19:35	Ebbe 52'	Report	Handling 74'; Froxylias 84'	Stadium: Park Hall; Attendance: 825; Referee: Neil Doyle

18 February 2018	**Inverness Caledonian Thistle**	**3–2**	Crusaders	Inverness, Scotland
17:15	Oakley 1'; Chalmers 13'; Mulraney 44'	Report	Heatley 57', 79'	Stadium: Caledonian Stadium; Attendance: 1,044; Referee: Bryn Markham-Jones

== Final ==
24 March 2018	Dumbarton	**0–1**	**Inverness Caledonian Thistle**	Perth, Scotland
16:15		Report	Tremarco 90+2'	Stadium: McDiarmid Park; Attendance: 4,602; Referee: Andrew Dallas

== Statistics ==
=== Top goalscorers ===
As of matches played on 24 March 2018

Rank	Player	Club	Goals
1	(Scotland) Stephen Dobbie	Queen of the South	4
1	(Scotland) Lewis Vaughan	Raith Rovers	4
3	(Scotland) Aidan Smith	Annan Athletic	3
3	(Scotland) Mitchel Megginson	Cove Rangers	3
3	(Democratic Republic of the Congo) Patrick N'Koyi	Dundee United	3
3	(Scotland) Andy Ryan	Dunfermline Athletic	3
3	(Scotland) Neil McLaughlin	Partick Thistle U20s	3
3	(Scotland) Gavin Reilly	St Mirren	3
9	20 players		2

== Player of the Round ==
The Golden Ball Award is a 'Player of the Round' award given to the player who is adjudged to have had the best performance of that round out of all the players in teams left competing in that round of the competition. The winner is voted for by supporters from a chosen short-list of players, which is posted on the Irn-Bru Football Twitter page.

Round	Player	Club	Match	Ref
First Round	(Scotland) Kevin Fraser	Buckie Thistle	2–1 v Brechin City (H)	
Second Round	(Scotland) Gavin Reilly	St Mirren	3–1 v Heart of Midlothian U20s (H)	
Third Round	(England) Myles Hippolyte	Falkirk	2–0 v Dunfermline Athletic (H)	
Quarter-finals	(Northern Ireland) Gavin Whyte	Crusaders	2–1 v Dundee United (A)	
Semi-finals	(Cyprus) Dimitris Froxylias	Dumbarton	2–1 v The New Saints (A)	

== Broadcasting rights ==
The domestic broadcasting rights for the competition are held jointly by BBC Alba, S4C (for matches involving Welsh teams) and subscription channel Premier Sports. Prior to the re-format in the 2016–17 season, BBC Alba had exclusive rights.

The following matches are to be broadcast live on UK television:

Round	BBC Alba	S4C	Premier Sports
Second Round		The New Saints v Livingston	
Third Round	Dundee United v Linfield	The New Saints v Elgin City	
Quarter-Finals	Inverness Caledonian Thistle v Falkirk	The New Saints v Queen of the South	
Semi-Finals	Inverness Caledonian Thistle v Crusaders	The New Saints v Dumbarton	
Final	Dumbarton v Inverness Caledonian Thistle		
