= 2017–18 Dumbarton F.C. season =

Dumbarton
2017–18 season
- Chairman: Les Hope (until April) John Steele (May – )
- Manager: Stevie Aitken
- Stadium: YOUR Radio 103FM Stadium (until 1/5/18) C&G Systems Stadium (5/5/18 – )
- Championship: 9th (relegated via playoffs)
- Challenge Cup: Finalists (lost to Inverness Caledonian Thistle)
- League Cup: Group Stage
- Scottish Cup: Last 16 (lost to Greenock Morton)
- Top goalscorer: League: Dimitris Froxylias (4); All: Calum Gallagher (7)
- Highest home attendance: League: 1,652 (vs St Mirren January 2018); Cup: 888 (vs Raith Rovers November 2017)
- Lowest home attendance: League: 392 (vs Inverness CT March 2018); Cup: 366 (vs Annan Athletic July 2017)
Home colours	Away colours

Season 2017–18 was Dumbarton's sixth in the second tier of Scottish football, having finished eighth in 2016–17. Dumbarton also competed in the Challenge Cup, Scottish League Cup and the Scottish Cup.

== Story of the season ==
=== May ===
May started with Stevie Aitken releasing four members of the squad, on top of the two who had already agreed deals elsewhere. Garry Fleming lead the list, departing after 179 appearances for the club, he was joined by Tom Lang, Mark Docherty and Donald McCallum. Also leaving the club were Robert Thomson who joined Greenock Morton and Andy Stirling who joined Queen of the South.

The club's Head of Youth, Tony McNally, was next to leave, on 19 May. Meanwhile, Les Hope was announced as the club's new chairman, replacing Alan Jardine.

Manager Stevie Aitken agreed a new two-year contract with the club on 24 May, and he was joined in agreeing terms for the new campaign by assistant Ian Durrant. Seven players also signed contracts for the new season, with Christian Nadé, Stuart Carswell, Calum Gallagher, Grant Gallagher, Kyle Prior, David Smith and Jamie Ewings all agreeing one year contracts. Defender Gregor Buchanan turned down a new deal however, and joined St Mirren. Player of the year Alan Martin also moved on. Joining Queen of the South.

The club's chief scout (and former player) Stuart Millar moved on, on 28 May, joining Stranraer in a similar role.

May ended with the club's sponsorship deal with Cheaper Insurance Direct expiring, meaning that the stadium reverted to being called the Dumbarton Football Stadium.

=== June ===
June started with a press release stating that the club's owners (Brabco) had formally applied for planning permission for a new stadium.

Dumbarton were then drawn against Kilmarnock, Ayr United, Annan Athletic and Clyde in the group stage of the Scottish League Cup.

On 6 June club captain Darren Barr rejected a new deal to join Greenock Morton as the coach of their development squad.

Pre-season friendlies were announced, with a game against Albion Rovers at Cliftonhill, and home matches against Clydebank and Partick Thistle scheduled.

Jamie Ewings was announced as the club's new goalkeeper coach on 9 June, before Andy Dowie became their first signing of the summer – joining from Queen of the South. Forward Mark Stewart was next to sign, joining the club after three seasons with Raith Rovers. A week later Tom Walsh rejoined the club on a one-year deal from Limerick, having spent time on loan at the club during the 2015–16 season. Defender Craig Barr was next to arrive, from Raith Rovers, on a one-year deal, Barr's signing was followed by that of goalkeeper Scott Gallacher from Hibernian.

On 26 June there were further boardroom changes, as Ian Wilson (one of the main members of Brabco, and drivers behind the new stadium move) resigned from the board, in order to concentrate on the holding company's other interests. On the same day midfielder David Wilson joined having left Partick Thistle. A day later it became clear that the new stadium development was in difficulty over fears that it could destroy a former home of Robert the Bruce. June ended with the club revealing their new Joma home kit, which was a modern take on their traditional white, black and gold colours.

=== July ===
July 1 saw the team take to the pitch for the first time in a low key 0–0 draw with Stranraer at Lochinch Park. Winger Chris Johnston became the club's third summer arrival from Raith Rovers, after Mark Stewart and Craig Barr, joining on 7 July. That was followed by a 1–1 draw with Albion Rovers at Cliftonhill, where Calum Gallagher scored his first goal for the club. The first home pre-season friendly saw Sons host Scottish Premiership side Partick Thistle. Goals by Christian Nadé and trialist Jordan Allan gave Stevie Aitken's men a 2–1 win.

A day later it was announced that summer signing Andy Dowie would be the club's new captain, taking over the role vacated by Darren Barr. Dumbarton ended their pre-season campaign unbeaten, after goals from Calum Gallagher and Mark Stewart gave them a 2–1 victory over local rivals Clydebank on 15 July. The same day the club announced the double signing of defenders Christopher McLaughlin and Dougie Hill.

On 17 July a new 2 year sponsorship deal was agreed with local radio station Your Radio, which saw the Dumbarton Football Stadium become known as The Your Radio 103FM Stadium. Prior to the start of the Betfred Cup campaign, striker Ally Roy joined on loan from Hearts. Following injuries to Grant Gallagher and Stuart Carswell midfielder Kyle Hutton joined the squad from St Mirren on 21 July, having previously worked with Ian Durrant at Rangers. A week later former Hibernian midfielder Danny Handling joined the club, having negotiated his release from the Easter Road club.

Once again Dumbarton exited the Betfred Cup at the group stage, following a dismal run which included defeats to Ayr United, Clyde and Kilmarnock as well as a penalty shootout defeat to Annan Athletic.

=== August ===
August began with Stevie Aitken securing the signing of Celtic U20s captain Sam Wardrop on a season long development loan. Dumbarton's league season began with a 0–0 draw at home to Greenock Morton. In the Scottish Challenge Cup Dumbarton tasted victory for first time since 2015 (and for only the sixth time in their history) as they overcame Rangers U20s 2–1. Calum Gallagher and Mark Stewart got the Sons goals – their first competitive strikes for the club. After scoring just once in four league games (two draws, two defeats) Stevie Aitken dipped into the transfer market again on 30 August to sign Ross County striker Greg Morrison, on loan from the Scottish Premiership side until January. On deadline day he added to the squad again, signing Cypriot attacker Dimitris Froxylias from Ermis Aradippou.

=== September ===
September began with a 2–1 Scottish Challenge Cup success over Welsh Premier League runners-up Connah's Quay Nomads at the YOUR Radio 103FM Stadium, in what was the first competitive match in history between Sons and a Welsh side. An early Callum Morris penalty gave the visitors the lead, before David Wilson equalised with his first senior goal. That sent the game into extra-time, with debutant Dimitris Froxylias scoring a final minute free-kick to win the tie. Their reward was another home tie, this time against Scottish League One Stranraer managed by Aitken's former assistant at Dumbarton Stevie Farrell.

In the league, the Sons finally secured their first league victory of the campaign on 16 September, beating fellow part-timers Brechin City 2–1 at the YOUR Radio 103FM Stadium thanks to late goals from Mark Stewart and Dimitris Froxylias. They followed this up with another 2–1 home victory, this time against Inverness Caledonian Thistle in the first ever league meeting between the sides. Dimitris Froxylias scored again, with Celtic loanee Sam Wardrop scoring the winner with his first goal in senior football. The month ended with a 2–1 defeat against Livingston at Almondvale Stadium, where Tom Walsh scored his first goal of his second spell with the club.

=== October ===
October began with Sons making it into the quarter-finals of the Scottish Challenge Cup for the first time in 15 years after a 2–1 success against Stranraer. They were drawn to face Raith Rovers in the next round.

Back on league duty, the side fell to their second consecutive defeat, against St Mirren at the YOUR Radio 103FM Stadium.

In the Scottish Cup meanwhile, Sons were handed a home tie against Elgin City.

A draw with Morton at Cappielow followed, with Mark Stewart scoring an early opener. The following week attacker Dimitris Froxylias agreed a contract extension until the end of the season, after impressing with 3 goals and 2 assists in his 8 appearances for the club. The month ended winless in the league for Sons, with Dundee United taking all three points thanks to two goals from former Dumbarton loanee Sam Stanton.

=== November ===
November began with Sons securing their first away league win of the season, 1–0 against Brechin City thanks to an injury time Willie Dyer own-goal. The Sons made it two victories in a row, and made it to the semi-finals of the Scottish Challenge Cup for the first time in their history, the following week – with a 2–0 success over Raith Rovers thanks to goals from Christopher McLaughlin and Ally Roy. A further success followed a week later, as Stuart Carswell's first career goal was enough to defeat Elgin City in the Scottish Cup. Sons continued the run, as Dimitris Froxylias returned from injury with a stunning goal in a 2–2 draw with Dunfermline Athletic. They ended the month undefeated, with Greg Morrison scoring his first goal for the club in a 2–2 draw with Queen of the South.

=== December ===
The good form continued into December, as Tom Walsh scored the winner against his former club St Mirren, a result that knocked the Paisley club off the top of the table. After going through November unbeaten, Stevie Aitken was named Ladbrokes Championship Manager of the Month. Sons finally fell to their first defeat since October, against Inverness on 16 December. This was followed by a 0–0 draw with Falkirk in which left-back Chris McLaughlin was stretchered off with a serious injury. Three days later Sons were back in action again, falling to a 4–1 defeat at home to Livingston, with Kyle Hutton being sent-off. Snow forced their final scheduled game of the year, a home tie against Greenock Morton to be called off. The month ended with left-back Liam Dick joining the club from Stranraer.

=== January ===
Dumbarton opened the year with a goal-less draw against Queen of the South at Palmerston Park. Later in the week young midfielder Kyle Prior joined Lowland Football League side BSC Glasgow on loan until the end of the season. An early Joe Cardle goal consigned the club to their first defeat of 2018 against Dunfermline Athletic, a result that also left them without a home league victory since September. Iain Russell became the club's second signing of the January window, as he came out of retirement to re-join the club after leaving in 2006. A day later Sons tasted defeat again, going down 0–2 against league leaders St Mirren at the YOUR Radio 103FM Stadium, meaning that they still hadn't scored in 2018. Post-match it was confirmed that attacker Ally Roy wouldn't be having his loan spell from Hearts extended. On 22 January striker Kevin Nisbet joined the club on loan from Partick Thistle. A day later Dumbarton extended their run in the Scottish Cup with a 3–2 victory against Peterhead at Balmoor Stadium thanks to a double from Calum Gallagher and Iain Russell's first goal for the club since returning. That set up a fifth round tie with Greenock Morton. Despite the cup success however, Dumbarton remained winless (and goal-less) in the league in 2018, as first-half goals from Alan Lithgow and Ryan Hardie consigned them to a 2–0 defeat to Livingston. On the penultimate day of the January transfer window winger Andy Stirling returned to the club on-loan from Queen of the South.

=== February ===
Dumbarton's first scheduled game of February against Brechin City fell victim to the weather. A week later winger Chris Johnston left the club on an emergency loan – joining Peterhead. The same day defender Aidan Wilson joined on an emergency loan from Rangers. After defeat to Greenock Morton in the Scottish Cup Aitken re-entered the emergency loan market, to add midfielder Liam Burt on a 28 day loan from Rangers. There was reason to be cheerful a day later, as Dumbarton made it to their first major national cup final for more than 100 years. Danny Handling's first goal for the club was followed by a stunning, late, Dimitris Froxylias free-kick, as Sons overcame Welsh Premier League Champions The New Saints to reach the final of the Scottish Challenge Cup. Four days later, and back on league action, Sons suffered defeat at the hands of Greenock Morton – despite a strong first half showing. Next up was a 0–0 draw with eighth placed Falkirk – a result that left the Sons still searching for their first league goal of 2018.

=== March ===
With no game scheduled for the first weekend in March due to the Scottish Cup, Dumbarton started the month with defeat against Queen of the South at the Your Radio stadium on 10 March. That was followed by the club's first league win (and goal) of the year, as Dimitris Froxylias scored the only goal in a victory against Brechin City. Four days later Brechin were defeated again, this time at Glebe Park, thanks to first league goals for the club from Calum Gallagher and Danny Handling and a Sean Crighton own-goal. It was heartbreak in the 2018 Scottish Challenge Cup Final however, as Carl Tremarco won the game in injury time for Inverness Caledonian Thistle. The month ended with heavy defeats, 5–0 at table-topping St Mirren, and 3–0 against playoff bound Livingston, where Grant Gallagher made his return after 18 months out injured.

=== April ===
April opened with a 2–0 midweek defeat against Dundee United. Four days later Sons faced the same opponents, and won 3–2, having gone ahead three times thanks to goals from Calum Gallagher and a brace from Craig Barr. It was then announced that Helensburgh based solicitor John Steele would become the club's new Chairman during the summer, replacing Les Hope who took up the role in May 2017. On the park meanwhile a last minute defeat to Greenock Morton left the Sons eight points adrift of eighth placed Falkirk with just four games remaining. Ninth place was confirmed after two defeats in five days to Inverness Caledonian Thistle, coupled with victory for Falkirk against Champions St Mirren, left the Sons 11 points adrift with just two matches remaining. During the match goalkeeper Jamie Ewings made his first league appearance for the club since May 2016 as a substitute for the injured Scott Gallacher. Ewings' first start followed, in a 5–2 defeat to Falkirk where Liam Burt scored his first goal for the club. Post-match Andy Dowie was named as the club's Player of the Year, Christopher McLaughlin won Young Player of the Year and Craig Barr won Players' Player of the Year. The league season ended with a 4–0 defeat to Dunfermline Athletic with Barr sent off after just nine minutes, setting up a playoff semi-final tie with Arbroath.

=== May ===
May opened with the club's stadium sponsorship deal with Your Radio being terminated due to the station's financial situation. In the first-leg of the playoff final Sons defeated League One Arbroath 2–1 thanks to an injury time Craig Barr goal – with the defender only playing after appealing his red card. The second leg finished 1–1, with Dougie Hill scoring his first goal for the club. The same day the Dumbarton Football Stadium was renamed as the 'C&G Systems Stadium' thanks to a new three year sponsorship deal. In the first-leg of the final, a stunning Stuart Carswell goal (just the second of his career) was enough to defeat Alloa Athletic. In the second-leg however the Sons lost by two goals to nil after extra-time, meaning relegation to Scottish League One for the first time since the 2011–12 season.

== First team transfers ==
- From end of 2016–17 season, to last match of season 2017–18

=== In ===
Player	From	League	Fee
(Scotland) Andy Dowie	(Scotland) Queen of the South	Scottish Championship	Free
(Scotland) Mark Stewart	(Scotland) Raith Rovers	Scottish League One	Free
(Scotland) Tom Walsh	(Republic of Ireland) Limerick	League of Ireland Premier Division	Free
(Scotland) Craig Barr	(Scotland) Raith Rovers	Scottish League One	Free
(Scotland) Scott Gallacher	(Scotland) Hibernian	Scottish Premiership	Free
(Scotland) David Wilson	(Scotland) Partick Thistle	Scottish Premiership	Free
(Scotland) Chris Johnston	(Scotland) Raith Rovers	Scottish League One	Free
(Scotland) Dougie Hill	(Scotland) Brechin City	Scottish Championship	Free
(Scotland) Christopher McLaughlin	(Scotland) Ross County	Scottish Premiership	Free
(Scotland) Ally Roy	(Scotland) Hearts	Scottish Premiership	Loan
(Scotland) Kyle Hutton	(Scotland) St Mirren	Scottish Championship	Free
(Scotland) Danny Handling	(Scotland) Hibernian	Scottish Premiership	Free
(Scotland) Sam Wardrop	(Scotland) Celtic	Scottish Premiership	Loan
(Scotland) Greg Morrison	(Scotland) Ross County	Scottish Premiership	Loan
(Cyprus) Dimitris Froxylias	(Cyprus) Ermis Aradippou	Cypriot First Division	Free
(Scotland) Liam Dick	(Scotland) Stranraer	Scottish League One	Free
(Scotland) Iain Russell	(Scotland) Free agent	N/A	Free
(Scotland) Kevin Nisbet	(Scotland) Partick Thistle F.C.	Scottish Premiership	Loan
(Scotland) Andy Stirling	(Scotland) Queen of the South	Scottish Championship	Loan
(Scotland) Aidan Wilson	(Scotland) Rangers	Scottish Premiership	Loan
(Scotland) Liam Burt	(Scotland) Rangers	Scottish Premiership	Loan

=== Out ===
Player	To	League	Fee
(Scotland) Robert Thomson	(Scotland) Greenock Morton	Scottish Championship	Free
(Scotland) Andy Stirling	(Scotland) Queen of the South	Scottish Championship	Free
(Scotland) Donald McCallum	(Scotland) Campbeltown Pupils AFC	Scottish Amateur Premier League	Free
(Scotland) Garry Fleming	(Scotland) Alloa Athletic	Scottish League One	Free
(Scotland) Mark Docherty	(Scotland) East Fife	Scottish League One	Free
(Scotland) Tom Lang	(Scotland) Stranraer	Scottish League One	Free
(Scotland) Alan Martin	(Scotland) Queen of the South	Scottish Championship	Free
(Scotland) Gregor Buchanan	(Scotland) St Mirren	Scottish Championship	Free
(Scotland) Darren Barr	(Scotland) Greenock Morton	Scottish Championship	Free
(Scotland) Kyle Prior	(Scotland) BSC Glasgow	Lowland Football League	Loan
(Scotland) Chris Johnston	(Scotland) Peterhead	Scottish League Two	Free

== Fixtures and results ==
Win Draw Loss Upcoming fixture

=== Friendlies ===
1 July 2017 Friendly	Stranraer	0–0	Dumbarton	Glasgow
11:00		Report		Stadium: Pollok Country Park

8 July 2017 Friendly	Albion Rovers	1–1	Dumbarton	Coatbridge
14:00	Joao Victoria 23'	Report	Calum Gallagher 67'	Stadium: Cliftonhill; Referee: S Reid

11 July 2017 Friendly	Dumbarton	2–1	Partick Thistle	Dumbarton
19:45	Christian Nadé 11', Jordan Allan (T) 82'	Report	Kevin Nisbet 52'	Stadium: Dumbarton Football Stadium; Attendance: 686; Referee: Steven McLean

15 July 2017 Friendly	Dumbarton	2–1	Clydebank	Dumbarton
12:00	Calum Gallagher 42', Mark Stewart 76'	Report	Jordan Shelvey 11'	Stadium: Dumbarton Football Stadium; Attendance: 308; Referee: Stephen Brown

=== Scottish Championship ===
5 August 2017 Championship	Dumbarton	0–0	Greenock Morton	Dumbarton Football Stadium
15:00		SPFL Report		Attendance: 1,161; Referee: Steven Kirkland; Man of the Match: Craig Barr

12 August 2017 Championship	Falkirk	1–1	Dumbarton	The Falkirk Stadium
15:00	Myles Hippolyte 24' (pen.)	SPFL Report	Alistair Roy 14'	Attendance: 3,864; Referee: Alan Muir

19 August 2017 Championship	Queen of the South	1–0	Dumbarton	Palmerston Park
15:00	Callum Fordyce 44'	SPFL Report		Attendance: 1,442; Referee: Kevin Graham

26 August 2017 Championship	Dumbarton	0–4	Dunfermline Athletic	Dumbarton Football Stadium
15:00	Andy Dowie (yellow card) 19' (yellow-red card) 76'	SPFL Report	Joe Cardle 5', Kallum Higginbotham 28', Nicky Clark 87', Andy Ryan 90+1'	Attendance: 1,028; Referee: Barry Cook; Man of the Match: Craig Barr

9 September 2017 Championship	Dundee United	1–1	Dumbarton	Tannadice Stadium
15:00	James Keatings 87'	DFC Report	David Smith 4'	Attendance: 5,331; Referee: Greg Aitken

16 September 2017 Championship	Dumbarton	2–1	Brechin City	Dumbarton Football Stadium
15:00	Mark Stewart 82', Dimitris Froxylias 86'	Report	Jordan Sinclair 2', Aron Lynas (red card) 70'	Attendance: 589; Referee: Nick Walsh; Man of the Match: Dimitris Froxylias

23 September 2017 Championship	Dumbarton	2–1	Inverness Caledonian Thistle	Dumbarton Football Stadium
15:00	Dimitris Froxylias 46', Sam Wardrop 62'	Report	Connor Bell 8', Gary Warren (yellow card) 60' (yellow-red card) 78'	Attendance: 594; Referee: Colin Steven; Man of the Match: Dimitris Froxylias

30 September 2017 Championship	Livingston	2–1	Dumbarton	Almondvale Stadium
15:00	Alan Lithgow 19', Craig Halkett 85'	Report	Tom Walsh 76'	Attendance: 938; Referee: Mat Northcroft

14 October 2017 Championship	Dumbarton	0–2	St Mirren	Dumbarton Football Stadium
15:00		Report	Gavin Reilly 36', John Sutton 70'	Attendance: 1178; Referee: Alan Newlands; Man of the Match: Christopher McLaughlin

21 October 2017 Championship	Greenock Morton	1–1	Dumbarton	Cappielow
15:00	Bob McHugh 50'	Report	Mark Stewart 5'	Attendance: 1428; Referee: Barry Cook

28 October 2017 Championship	Dumbarton	0–2	Dundee United	Dumbarton Football Stadium
15:00	Craig Barr (yellow card) 53' (yellow-red card) 63'	Report	Sam Stanton 2', 15'	Attendance: 968; Referee: Craig Charleston; Man of the Match: Dimitris Froxylias

4 November 2017 Championship	Brechin City	0–1	Dumbarton	Glebe Park
15:00		Report	OG 90'	Attendance: 538; Referee: Don Robertson

25 November 2017 Championship	Dunfermline Athletic	2–2	Dumbarton	East End Park
15:00	Callum Morris 55', Nicky Clark 88'	Report	Tom Walsh 51', Dimitris Froxylias 68'	Attendance: 4505; Referee: Nick Walsh

28 November 2017 Championship	Dumbarton	2–2	Queen of the South	Dumbarton Football Stadium
19:45	OG 11', Greg Morrison 81'	Report	Stephen Dobbie 70' (pen.), OG 84'	Attendance: 474; Referee: Alan Newlands; Man of the Match: Sam Wardrop

2 December 2017 Championship	St Mirren	0–1	Dumbarton	St Mirren Park
15:00	Stelios Demetriou (red card) 43'	Report	Tom Walsh 80'	Attendance: 3591; Referee: Andrew Dallas

16 December 2017 Championship	Inverness Caledonian Thistle	1–0	Dumbarton	Caledonian Stadium
15:00	Carl Tremarco 34'	Report		Attendance: 2103; Referee: Steven Kirkland

23 December 2017 Championship	Dumbarton	0–0	Falkirk	Dumbarton Football Stadium
15:00		Report		Attendance: 874; Referee: John McKendrick; Man of the Match: Scott Gallacher

26 December 2017 Championship	Dumbarton	1–4	Livingston	Dumbarton Football Stadium
14:00	Ally Roy 25', Kyle Hutton (yellow card) 90' (yellow-red card) 90+1'	Report	Craig Halkett 27', Scott Pittman 43', Dylan Mackin 58', Scott Robinson 80', Matthew Knox (penalty missed)	Attendance: 495; Referee: Nick Walsh; Man of the Match: Ally Roy

2 January 2018 Championship	Queen of the South	0–0	Dumbarton	Palmerston Park
15:00		Report		Attendance: 1,269; Referee: Barry Cook

6 January 2018 Championship	Dumbarton	0–1	Dunfermline Athletic	Dumbarton Football Stadium
15:00		Report	Joe Cardle 24'	Attendance: 1,086; Referee: John Beaton; Man of the Match: Stuart Carswell

13 January 2018 Championship	Dumbarton	0–2	St Mirren	Dumbarton Football Stadium
15:00		Report	Cammy Smith 47', Stephen McGinn 58'	Attendance: 1,652; Referee: Kevin Graham; Man of the Match: Andy Dowie

27 January 2018 Championship	Livingston	2–0	Dumbarton	Almondvale Stadium
15:00	Alan Lithgow 23', Ryan Hardie 28'	Report		Attendance: 732; Referee: Colin Steven

20 February 2018 Championship	Dumbarton	0–1	Greenock Morton	Dumbarton Football Stadium
19:45		Report	Thomas O'Ware 74'	Attendance: 833; Referee: Don Robertson

24 February 2018 Championship	Falkirk	0–0	Dumbarton	Falkirk Stadium
15:00		Report		Attendance: 6,094; Referee: Colin Steven

10 March 2018 Championship	Dumbarton	0–1	Queen of the South	Dumbarton Football Stadium
15:00		Report	Dom Thomas 48'	Attendance: 642; Referee: Stephen Finnie; Man of the Match: Kyle Hutton

13 March 2018 Championship	Dumbarton	1–0	Brechin City	Dumbarton Football Stadium
19:45	Dimitris Froxylias 37'	Report		Attendance: Alan Newlands; Referee: 403; Man of the Match: Andy Dowie

17 March 2018 Championship	Brechin City	1–3	Dumbarton	Glebe Park
15:00	Craig Storie 38'	Report	Calum Gallagher 11', OG 24', Danny Handling 43'	Attendance: 445; Referee: Alan Muir

27 March 2018 Championship	St Mirren	5–0	Dumbarton	St Mirren Park
19:45	Lewis Morgan 31' 85', Cammy Smith 32', Danny Mullen 49', Gavin Reilly 70'	Report		Attendance: 3964; Referee: Colin Steven

31 March 2018 Championship	Dumbarton	0–3	Livingston	Dumbarton Football Stadium
15:00	Aidan Wilson (yellow card) 20' (yellow-red card) 80'	Report	Lee Miller 34', Ryan Hardie 36', Raffaele De Vita 45'	Attendance: 670; Referee: Barry Cook

3 April 2018 Championship	Dundee United	2–0	Dumbarton	Tannadice Park
19:45	Paul McMullen 30', Bilel Mohsni 45+1'	Report		Attendance: 3,620; Referee: Kevin Clancy

7 April 2018 Championship	Dumbarton	3–2	Dundee United	Dumbarton Football Stadium
15:00	Calum Gallagher 11', Craig Barr 59' 79'	Report	Anthony Ralston 51', Scott McDonald 70'	Attendance: 994; Referee: Steven McLean; Man of the Match: Craig Barr

10 April 2018 Championship	Greenock Morton	3–2	Dumbarton	Cappielow Park
19:45	Fraser 62'; Baird 69'; Iredale 90+4'	Report	Handling 55'; O'Ware 87' (o.g.)	Attendance: 1,134; Referee: Craig Charleston

14 April 2018 Championship	Inverness Caledonian Thistle	5–1	Dumbarton	Caledonian Stadium
15:00	Aaron Doran 17', Nathan Austin 41' 50' 66', Iain Vigurs 63'	Report	Grant Gallagher 13'	Attendance: 2,355; Referee: Gavin Duncan

18 April 2018 Championship	Dumbarton	0–1	Inverness Caledonian Thistle	Dumbarton Football Stadium
19:45		Report	Iain Vigurs 56'	Attendance: 392; Referee: Don Robertson

21 April 2018 Championship	Dumbarton	2–5	Falkirk	Dumbarton Football Stadium
15:00	Calum Gallagher 37', Liam Burt 87'	Report	Alex Jakubiak 19', Louis Longridge 47', Thomas Robson 59', Craig Sibbald 70', Joe McKee 86'	Attendance: 942; Referee: Mike Roncone; Man of the Match: Stuart Carswell

28 April 2018 Championship	Dunfermline Athletic	4–0	Dumbarton	East End Park
15:00	Kallum Higginbotham 18' 25', Fraser Aird 45', Ryan Williamson 65'	Report	Craig Barr (red card) 9'	Attendance: 5,506; Referee: Colin Steven

=== Scottish Championship play-offs ===
1 May 2017 Championship play-off Semi-final 1st Leg	Arbroath	1–2	Dumbarton	Gayfield Park
19:45	Bobby Linn 64'	Report	Calum Gallagher 55', Craig Barr 90+3'	Attendance: 892; Referee: Nick Walsh

5 May 2017 Championship play-off Semi-final 2nd Leg	Dumbarton	1–1 (3–2 agg.)	Arbroath	Dumbarton Football Stadium
15:00	Dougie Hill 9'	Report	Gavin Swankie 27'	Attendance: 872; Referee: Craig Charleston; Man of the Match: Dougie Hill

9 May 2017 Championship play-off Final 1st Leg	Alloa Athletic	0–1	Dumbarton	Recreation Park
19:45		Report	Stuart Carswell 6'	Attendance: 811; Referee: John McKendrick; Man of the Match: Craig Barr

13 May 2017 Championship play-off Final 2nd Leg	Dumbarton	0–2 (a.e.t.) (1–2 agg.)	Alloa Athletic	Dumbarton Football Stadium
16:05		Report	Ross Stewart 90+3', Jordan Kirkpatrick 95'	Attendance: 1,115; Referee: John Beaton

=== Scottish Cup ===
18 November 2017 3rd round	Dumbarton	1–0	Elgin City	Dumbarton
15:00	Stuart Carswell 24'	Report		Stadium: Dumbarton Football Stadium; Attendance: 491; Referee: Colin Steven

23 January 2018 4th round	Peterhead	2–3	Dumbarton	Peterhead
19:45	Jason Brown 31', Mason Robertson 83'	Report	Calum Gallagher 12', 53', Iain Russell 56'	Stadium: Balmoor Stadium; Attendance: 691; Referee: Gavin Ross

10 February 2018 5th round	Greenock Morton	3–0	Dumbarton	Greenock
15:00	Frank Ross 12', Jack Iredale 49', Robert McHugh 80'	Report		Stadium: Cappielow Park; Attendance: 1,746; Referee: Craig Thomson

=== Scottish League Cup ===
==== Table ====
Pos	Team	Pld	W	PW	PL	L	GF	GA	GD	Pts	Qualification	AYR	KIL	CLY	ANN	DUM
1	Ayr United (Q)	4	4	0	0	0	15	3	+12	12	Qualification for the Second Round	—	1–0	5–1	—	—
2	Kilmarnock (Q)	4	3	0	0	1	9	3	+6	9	Qualification for the Second Round	—	—	4–2	—	3–0
3	Clyde	4	2	0	0	2	7	11	−4	6		—	—	—	2–1	2–1
4	Annan Athletic	4	0	1	0	3	2	10	−8	2		1–6	0–2	—	—	—
5	Dumbarton	4	0	0	1	3	2	8	−6	1		1–3	—	—	0–0p	—

Rules for classification: 1) goal difference, 2) goals scored, 3) away goals scored, 4) matches won, 5) away matches won, 6) drawing of lots.
(Q) Qualified to the phase indicated

==== Matches ====
18 July 2017 Group stage	Dumbarton	1–3	Ayr United	Dumbarton
19:45	Christian Nade 45'	Report	OG 36', Declan McDaid 71', Rab Crawford 87'	Stadium: Dumbarton Football Stadium; Attendance: 615; Referee: Barry Cook

22 July 2017 Group stage	Clyde	2–1	Dumbarton	Cumbernauld
15:00	Darren Miller 57', Max Wright 67'	Report	Craig Barr 31'	Stadium: Broadwood Stadium; Attendance: 416; Referee: John McKendrick

25 July 2017 Group stage	Dumbarton	0–0 (3–4 p)	Annan Athletic	Dumbarton
19:45	Christian Nadé (red card) 32'	Report	Owen Moxon (yellow card) 64' (yellow-red card) 72'	Stadium: Dumbarton Football Stadium; Attendance: 366; Referee: Craig Charleston

29 July 2017 Group stage	Kilmarnock	3–0	Dumbarton	Kilmarnock
15:00	Chris Burke 53', Kris Boyd 73', Lee Erwin 76'	Report		Stadium: Rugby Park; Attendance: 2,444; Referee: Bobby Madden; Man of the Match: Adam Frizzell

=== Scottish Challenge Cup ===
16 August 2017 1st round	Dumbarton	2–1	Rangers U20s	Dumbarton
19:45	Calum Gallagher 2' (pen.), Mark Stewart 49'	Report	Ryan Hardie 72'	Stadium: Dumbarton Football Stadium; Attendance: 389; Referee: Gavin Ross

2 September 2017 2nd round	Dumbarton	2–1	Connah's Quay Nomads	Dumbarton
14:30	David Wilson 81', Dimitris Froxylias 120'	Report	Callum Morris 26' (pen.), George Horan (yellow card) (yellow-red card) 98'	Stadium: Dumbarton Football Stadium; Attendance: 491; Referee: Ben Connolly

6 October 2017 3rd round	Dumbarton	2–1	Stranraer	Dumbarton
19:45	Craig Barr 12', Mark Stewart 65'	Report	Chukwunweike Okoh 90+3'	Stadium: Dumbarton Football Stadium; Attendance: 492; Referee: Greg Aitken

11 November 2017 Quarter-Finals	Dumbarton	2–0	Raith Rovers	Dumbarton
15:00	Christopher McLaughlin 20', Ally Roy 49'	Report	Greig Spence (red card) 58'	Stadium: Dumbarton Football Stadium; Attendance: 888; Referee: Kevin Graham; Man of the Match: Christopher McLaughlin

17 February 2018 Semi-Finals	The New Saints	1–2	Dumbarton	Oswestry
15:00	Dean Ebbe 52'	Report	Danny Handling 74', Dimitris Froxylias 84'	Stadium: Park Hall; Attendance: 825; Referee: Neil Doyle; Man of the Match: Craig Barr

24 March 2018 Final	Dumbarton	0–1	Inverness Caledonian Thistle	Perth
16:15		Report	Carl Tremarco 90+3'	Stadium: McDiarmid Park; Attendance: 4,602; Referee: Andrew Dallas; Man of the Match: Coll Donaldson

== League table ==
Pos	Team	Pld	W	D	L	GF	GA	GD	Pts	Promotion, qualification or relegation
6	Queen of the South	36	14	10	12	59	53	+6	52	
7	Greenock Morton	36	13	11	12	47	40	+7	50	
8	Falkirk	36	12	11	13	45	49	−4	47	
9	Dumbarton (R)	36	7	9	20	27	63	−36	30	Qualification for the Championship play-offs
10	Brechin City (R)	36	0	4	32	20	90	−70	4	Relegation to League One

Source: Soccerway
Rules for classification: 1) Points; 2) Goal difference; 3) Goals scored; 4) Points in head-to-head matches; 5) Goal difference in hth matches; 6). Goals scored in hth matches; 7). Play-off (only for deciding promotion, play-off participation and relegation).
(R) Relegated

== Player statistics ==
As of 22:38, 13 May 2018 (UTC)

=== All competitions ===
#	Position	Player	Starts	Subs	Unused subs	Goals	Red cards (red card)	Yellow cards (yellow card)
55	DF	(Scotland) Craig Barr	46	0	0	5	2	12
31	MF	(Scotland) Liam Burt	4	15	1	1	0	0
6	MF	(Scotland) Stuart Carswell	35	2	1	2	0	5
4	DF	(Scotland) Andy Dowie	48	0	1	0	1	5
22	DF	(Scotland) Liam Dick	17	0	0	0	0	4
19	GK	(Scotland) Jamie Ewings	2	2	49	0	0	0
20	MF	(Cyprus) Dimitris Froxylias	20	9	9	6	0	3
1	GK	(Scotland) Scott Gallacher	51	0	2	0	0	2
7	FW	(Scotland) Calum Gallagher	28	14	9	7	0	1
5	MF	(Scotland) Grant Gallagher	3	7	3	1	0	0
21	FW	(Scotland) Danny Handling	17	6	6	3	0	1
15	DF	(Scotland) Dougie Hill	26	3	19	1	0	8
14	MF	(Scotland) Kyle Hutton	44	3	0	0	1	13
11	MF	(Scotland) Chris Johnston	5	9	17	0	0	1
3	DF	(Scotland) Christopher McLaughlin	32	0	2	1	0	7
16	FW	(Scotland) Greg Morrison	6	9	0	1	0	2
27	FW	(France) Christian Nadé	12	16	1	1	1	4
24	FW	(Scotland) Kevin Nisbet	9	4	7	0	0	2
18	MF	(Scotland) Kyle Prior	0	4	16	0	0	0
17	FW	(Scotland) Ally Roy	11	14	5	3	0	2
23	FW	(Scotland) Iain Russell	9	5	2	1	0	1
2	DF	(Scotland) David Smith	25	4	8	1	0	1
9	FW	(Scotland) Mark Stewart	23	13	6	4	0	3
25	MF	(Scotland) Andy Stirling	16	0	1	0	0	2
10	FW	(Scotland) Tom Walsh	40	1	4	3	0	7
12	DF	(Scotland) Sam Wardrop	27	0	0	1	0	4
30	DF	(Scotland) Aidan Wilson	4	0	3	0	1	4
8	MF	(Scotland) David Wilson	23	10	15	1	0	2
