= Christian McLaughlin =

Christian McLaughlin may refer to:

- Christian McLaughlin (television writer) (born 1967), American television writer, producer, and author
- Christian McLaughlin (film producer), American film producer

== See also ==
- Chris McLaughlin (disambiguation)
- Christopher McLaughlin (born 1998), Scottish footballer
