= Peninsula FM =

Radio station in Scotland

Peninsula FM was a radio station founded by and aimed at the people of Helensburgh and the surrounding areas, in Argyll, Scotland.

When it was announced in 1999 that a licence would become available for Helensburgh and the Clyde Peninsula Towns, the then local station for Dumbarton, Castle Rock FM, thought they would automatically be given the rights to broadcast in the new catchment. The people of Helensburgh however, had other ideas. Founded by local businessman Mr. G Reynolds, the station ran for three very successful one-month Restricted Service Licences (RSL) between 1999 and 2001, on 105.4 FM.

The idea of the radio station was to offer a service that aimed to inform and entertain, focusing on 'connecting the community'; broadcasting from the heart of Helensburgh with maximum use of live interviews, with a mix of music and chat, and live sports coverage relevant to Helensburgh, Rhu, Garelochhead and the Rosneath peninsula villages of Kilcreggan, Cove and Clynder. Some of the highlights from the station include an exclusive interview with Murdo MacLeod from Celtic Football Club, and live broadcasts from the Rhu and Cardross Gala days. The support Peninsula FM gave to the Rhu Gala day was so successful in fact; they still provide the PA and music for the event to this day, albeit not live on air.

On 12 June 2003, Ofcom, the UK radio authority, granted the new licence to the Dumbarton station rather than Peninsula FM.
