= Chris McLaughlin =

Chris McLaughlin may refer to:

- Chris McLaughlin (journalist) (born 1955), British journalist
- Chris McLaughlin (sound engineer), American sound engineer

== See also ==
- Christian McLaughlin (disambiguation)
- Christopher McLaughlin (born 1998), Scottish footballer
