= A Better Life (film) =

2011 film directed by Chris Weitz

- Theatrical release poster
- Directed by: Chris Weitz
- Screenplay by: Eric Eason
- Story by: Roger L. Simon
- Produced by: Paul Junger Witt; Christian McLaughlin; Chris Weitz; Jami Gertz
- Starring: Demián Bichir
- Cinematography: Javier Aguirresarobe
- Edited by: Peter Lambert
- Music by: Alexandre Desplat
- Production companies: Lime Orchard Productions; Witt/Thomas Productions
- Distributed by: Summit Entertainment
- Release date: June 24, 2011
- Running time: 94 minutes
- Country: United States
- Languages: English; Spanish
- Budget: $10 million
- Box office: $1.7 million

A Better Life is a 2011 American drama film directed by Chris Weitz and written by Eric Eason, based on a story by Roger L. Simon. It stars Demián Bichir as an undocumented immigrant gardener in Los Angeles who, along with his teenage son, attempts to find his stolen truck.

The film received a limited release in the United States on June 24, 2011, by Summit Entertainment. For his performance, Bichir was nominated for the Academy Award for Best Actor.

== Plot ==
Carlos Galindo is a gardener in Los Angeles working with his partner, Blasco. His son, Luis, studies at high school. Luis spends time with his girlfriend, Ruthie, who is affiliated with gang members. They pressure him to join them. On one occasion, Luis is suspended for assaulting a student.

Carlos' sister, Anita, lends $12,000 from the family's emergency fund for Carlos to buy Blasco's truck. It is later stolen by Santiago, a worker whom Carlos had hired for his gardening business. The next day, Carlos and Luis head to a South Central apartment complex, which is used as lodgings for undocumented immigrant workers. One man tells the two that Santiago works at a nightclub. Carlos and Luis head to the restaurant, which would open during the night. At the rodeo, Carlos mentions to Luis about his mother abandoning them.

Luis mentions that he dislikes Mexican music and culture. After finding Santiago at the nightclub, Carlos and Luis interrogate him in the parking lot. They learn that he has sold the truck to a black market garage and sent the money to his family in El Salvador. When Santiago pleads not guilty, Carlos defends him and Luis angrily leaves them. The next day, Carlos convinces Luis to go with him to the black market garage where the truck is.

They retrieve the truck but are stopped by the police. Carlos is arrested and incarcerated in the United States as an undocumented immigrant. Luis visits the detention center and reconciles with his father. After promising Luis that he will return, Carlos boards the deportation bus and is sent back to Mexico. Although Luis' friends are joining gangs, he rejects that life and goes to live with his aunt's family. Four months later, Carlos attempts to return illegally to the United States to be with Luis, using a coyote to guide him and other migrants through the desert, knowing that, as a returning deportee, he will face criminal charges if he is caught.

== Cast ==
- Demián Bichir as Carlos Galindo
- José Julián as Luis Galindo
- Dolores Heredia as Anita
- Carlos Linares as Santiago
- Joaquín Cosío as Blasco Martinez
- Gabriel Chavarria as Ramon
- Chelsea Rendon as Ruthie Valdez
- Richard Cabral as Marcelo Valdez
- Rolando Molina as Jesus
- Nancy Lenehan as Mrs. Donnely
- Eddie "Piolín" Sotelo as himself
- Tom Schanley as ICE officer
- Tim Griffin as Juvie Officer
- Magi Avila as shot girl

== Production ==
The film was originally titled The Gardener. Uncommon among Hollywood productions, it is set in a Hispanic community and features an almost entirely Hispanic cast.

Weitz used the film to explore the culture and geography of Los Angeles. Father Gregory Boyle of Homeboy Industries, run by former gang members, helped Weitz and his crew with finding locations and making their film as authentic as possible. The language of the script was modified to reflect the actual slang used in Los Angeles, even reflecting linguistic differences from the street.

== Release ==
The film opened in limited release on June 24, 2011.

=== Critical reception ===
Critical response to the film has been positive. It has garnered an 86% "fresh" rating from Rotten Tomatoes, based on 104 reviews, and an average rating of 6.9/10. The critical consensus reads: "Powered by a terrific performance from Demián Bichir, A Better Life is an immigrant story told with simplicity and an ample amount of heart." The critical aggregator Metacritic awarded the film a score of 64 out of 100, based on 30 critics, signifying "generally positive reviews".

Manohla Dargis, film critic for The New York Times, called the film "Touching and startling." Peter Travers of Rolling Stone called the film "a haunting movie that gets under your skin."

Writing for Entertainment Weekly, Dave Karger called A Better Life an "unfussy, yet quite powerful drama with a terrific central performance by Demián Bichir." Karger called the film an "awards contender" and wrote, "With the right reviews and commercial reception, it could go even further." Roger Ebert of the Chicago Sun-Times, wrote "the performances are pitch perfect" and he gave the film three and a half out of four stars.

The New Yorker critic Richard Brody wrote: "The story unfolds without hagiography, pity, or trumped-up heroism, as the filmmaker approaches the lives of everyday people with modest compassion and imaginative sympathy. Amy Biancolli, writing in the Houston Chronicle, said "It's straight, true and heartbreaking, a masterstroke of raw emotional minimalism".

=== Awards ===
Award	Category	Nominee(s)	Result	Ref.
Academy Awards	Best Actor	Demián Bichir	Nominated	
Independent Spirit Awards	Best Male Lead	Demián Bichir	Nominated	
Screen Actors Guild Awards	Outstanding Performance by a Male Actor in a Leading Role	Demián Bichir	Nominated	
Young Artist Awards	Best Leading Young Actor in a Feature Film	José Julián	Nominated	

== Telenovela version ==
Telemundo produced a telenovela adaptation, Bajo el mismo cielo, starring Gabriel Porras and María Elisa Camargo. It aired from July 28, 2015 to January 25, 2016.
