= Scott Gallacher =

Scottish footballer (born 1989)

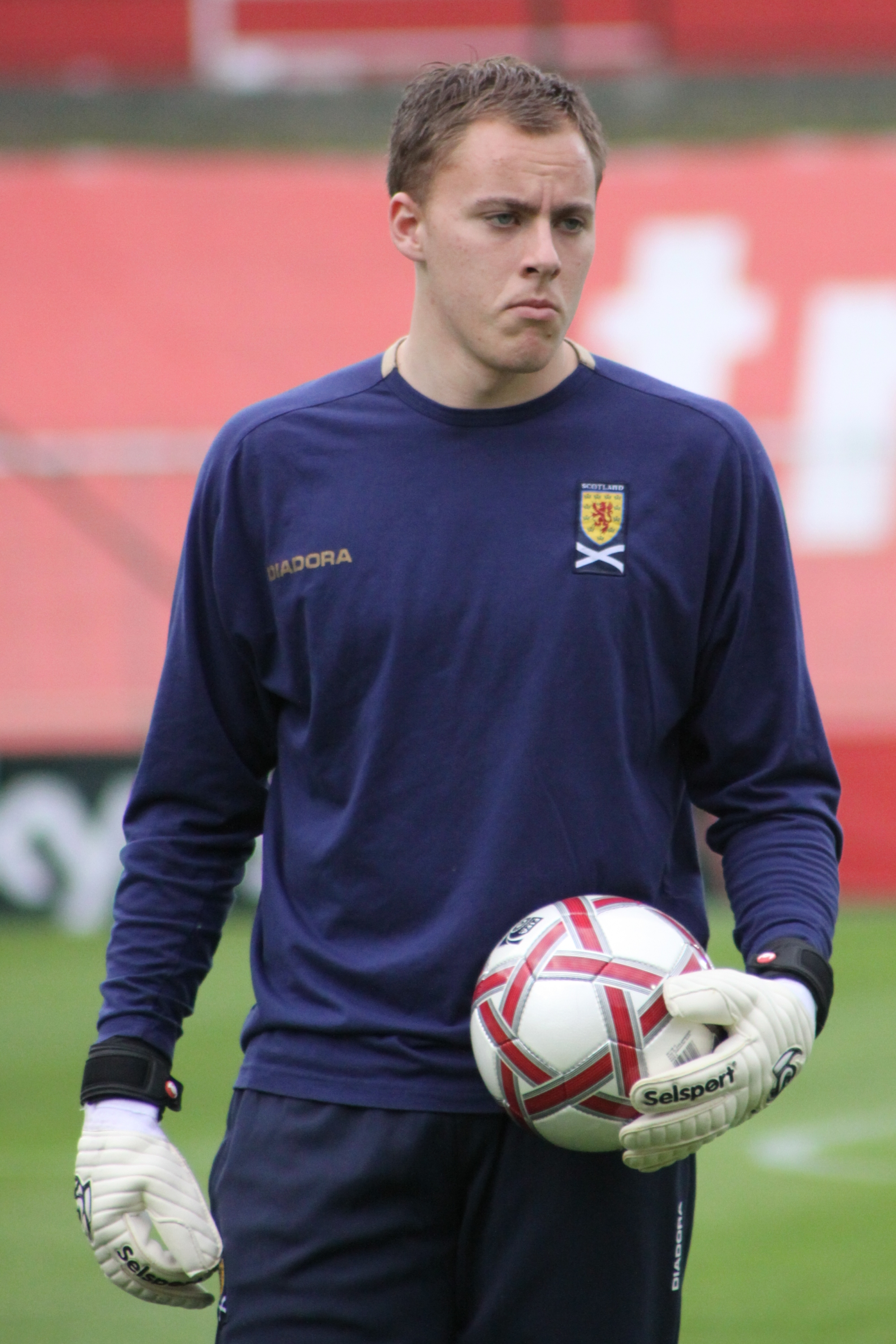
- Gallacher training with the Scotland U21s in 2009

Personal information
- Date of birth: 15 July 1989 (age 37)
- Place of birth: Bellshill, Scotland
- Height: 1.88 m (6 ft 2 in)
- Position: Goalkeeper

Senior career*
Years	Team	Apps	(Gls)
2006–2014	Rangers	11	(0)
2008–2009	→ Cowdenbeath (loan)	7	(0)
2010–2011	→ Forfar Athletic (loan)	29	(0)
2013	→ Airdrieonians (loan)	8	(0)
2014–2016	Heart of Midlothian	3	(0)
2015	→ Forfar Athletic (loan)	4	(0)
2016	Alloa Athletic	15	(0)
2016–2017	St Mirren	12	(0)
2017	Hibernian	0	(0)
2017–2018	Dumbarton	34	(0)
2018–2020	Airdrieonians	9	(0)
2020–2021	Arbroath	0	(0)
2021–2023	East Fife	11	(0)
2023	Alloa Athletic	0	(0)

International career
2008–2010	Scotland U21	5	(0)
- * Club domestic league appearances and goals as of 01:47, 14 January 2023 (UTC)

Scott Gallacher (born 15 July 1989) is a Scottish professional footballer who plays as a goalkeeper. Gallacher has previously played for Rangers, Cowdenbeath, Forfar Athletic, Airdrieonians, Heart of Midlothian, Alloa Athletic, St Mirren, Hibernian, Dumbarton, Arbroath and East Fife. He also played five times for the Scotland under-21 team between 2008 and 2010.

== Career ==
Gallacher started his career with Rangers. He helped the Rangers under-19 team win league and Scottish Youth Cup doubles in the 2006–07 and 2007–08 seasons being part of the most successful youth team of rangers history. He also travelled with the first team squad for a UEFA Cup tie against Hapoel Tel Aviv in February 2007 and involved in champions league squads against Stuttgart and Sevilla . He was included in the first team squad on many occasions and was an unused substitute many times, including an Old Firm derby on 5 May 2007. He joined Cowdenbeath, then in the Scottish Third Division on 1 September 2008. In 2010, Gallacher signed a six-month loan deal with Forfar Athletic which was later extended until the end of the season. Gallacher made his debut for Rangers in a 4–0 win over Albion Rovers. In September 2013, Gallacher signed on loan for Airdrieonians.

In July 2014, Gallacher signed for Scottish Championship side Heart of Midlothian on a two-year deal. Gallacher made his first team debut on 10 August 2014, coming on as a 67th-minute substitute at Ibrox Stadium in a league match against Rangers, replacing the injured Neil Alexander in a 2–1 win.

On 10 September 2015, Gallacher moved on loan to Forfar Athletic for a second time, joining on a short-term deal.

On 14 January 2016, Gallacher signed a contract with Alloa until the end of the season, after leaving Hearts by mutual consent. Gallagher signed a one-year deal with St Mirren in June 2016, beginning the season as the Saints first-choice goalkeeper. After Jack Ross his former Alloa manager was appointed manager of st mirren in October 2016, Gallacher was surprisingly dropped after man of the match performances in previous two games in favour of Jamie Langfield, however, he returned to the starting line-up in mid-November, playing in St Mirren's 2–1 victory over Ayr United in the Scottish Challenge Cup. Gallacher continued in goal for the side until January 2017. Hibs came calling for Gallachers signature after a mutual agreement to leave st mirren was confirmed. Hibernian. He left Hibs at the end of his short-term contract, in May 2017, and joined Dumbarton on 23 June 2017. After 51 appearances for the Sons and an irn bru cup final he rejected a new contract and joined Scottish League One side Airdrieonians on a two-year contract in May 2018. Gallacher suffered a serious knee injury in 2018 and was ruled out for a year. He regained his position after the long absence and kept numerous clean sheets until the season was cut short due to COVID-19. On 30 July 2020, Gallacher signed for Arbroath.

In May 2021 Gallacher signed for East Fife.

On 13 January 2023, Gallacher rejoined Alloa Athletic in league one after some financial difficulties at East Fife.

== Career statistics ==
As of 18:49, 11 August 2018 (UTC)

Appearances and goals by club, season and competition
Club	Season	League			Scottish Cup		League Cup		Other		Total	
Club	Season	Division	App	Goals	App	Goals	App	Goals	App	Goals	App	Goals
Rangers	2008–09	Scottish Premier League	0	0	0	0	0	0	0	0	0	0
Rangers	2009–10	Scottish Premier League	0	0	0	0	0	0	0	0	0	0
Rangers	2010–11	Scottish Premier League	0	0	0	0	0	0	0	0	0	0
Rangers	2011–12	Scottish Premier League	0	0	0	0	0	0	0	0	0	0
Rangers	2012–13	Scottish Third Division	0	0	0	0	0	0	0	0	0	0
Rangers	2013–14	Scottish League One	6	0	0	0	1	0	1	0	5	0
Rangers	Total		3	0	0	0	1	0	1	0	5	0
Cowdenbeath (loan)	2008–09	Scottish Third Division	7	0	1	0	0	0	0	0	8	0
Forfar Athletic (loan)	2010–11	Scottish Second Division	34	0	0	0	0	0	0	0	29	0
Airdrieonians (loan)	2013–14	Scottish League One	8	0	0	0	0	0	0	0	8	0
Heart of Midlothian	2014–15	Scottish Championship	3	0	0	0	0	0	0	0	3	0
Heart of Midlothian	2015–16	Scottish Premiership	0	0	0	0	0	0	0	0	0	0
Heart of Midlothian	Total		3	0	0	0	0	0	0	0	3	0
Forfar Athletic (loan)	2015–16	Scottish League One	4	0	0	0	0	0	0	0	4	0
Alloa Athletic	2015–16	Scottish Championship	15	0	0	0	0	0	0	0	15	0
St Mirren	2016–17	Scottish Championship	12	0	1	0	3	0	1	0	17	0
Hibernian	2016–17	Scottish Championship	0	0	0	0	0	0	0	0	0	0
Dumbarton	2017–18	Scottish Championship	34	0	3	0	4	0	10	0	51	0
Airdrieonians	2018–19	Scottish League One	2	0	0	0	4	0	0	0	6	0
Total			117	0	5	0	12	0	12	0	146	0
