= Christian McLaughlin (film producer) =

American film producer

Christian McLaughlin is an American film producer.

== Personal life ==
Christian McLaughlin is originally from Dover, Massachusetts and is a graduate of Colgate University. In 2011 Christian produced A Better Life, directed by Chris Weitz and starring Demián Bichir for which he was nominated for an Academy Award for Best Actor.

== Filmography ==
| Year | Title | Role |
|---|---|---|
| 2001 | Legally Blonde | co-producer |
| 2008 | The Diagnosis | producer |
| 2011 | A Better Life | producer |
| 2011 | Mardi Gras: Spring Break | producer |
| 2021 | Operation Mincemeat | Executive Producer |
