= Greg Morrison (footballer) =

Scottish footballer

Personal information
- Date of birth: 19 February 1998 (age 28)
- Place of birth: Keith, Scotland
- Height: 1.85 m (6 ft 1 in)
- Position: Forward

Team information
- Current team: Rothes
- Number: 9

Youth career
- –2015: Ross County

Senior career*
| Years | Team | Apps | (Gls) |
| 2015–2019 | Ross County | 7 | (0) |
| 2017–2018 | → Dumbarton (loan) | 14 | (1) |
| 2018–2019 | → Elgin City (loan) | 33 | (5) |
| 2019–2021 | Brora Rangers | | |
| 2021–2025 | Rothes | 74 | (20) |
| 2025– | Clachnacuddin | 0 | (0) |
- * Club domestic league appearances and goals as of 23:09, 31 January 2026 (UTC)

Greg Morrison (born 19 February 1998) is a Scottish professional footballer who plays as a forward for Highland League side Clachnacuddin.

== Career ==
Morrison came through the youth ranks at Ross County, scoring a number of goals and consistently was a standout performer. He made his first-team debut for County against Aberdeen in January 2016. On 30 August 2017, he joined Scottish Championship side Dumbarton on loan until January 2018. He scored his first goal for the club on his 11th appearance, in a 2–2 draw with Queen of the South in November 2017. After making 15 appearances for the Sons, scoring once, Morrison returned to the Staggies at the end of his loan spell. In August 2018, Morrison was loaned to Elgin City.

== Career statistics ==
As of match played 5 May 2019

Appearances and goals by club, season and competition
| Club | Season | League | | | Cup | | League Cup | | Other | | Total | |
| Club | Season | Division | Apps | Goals | Apps | Goals | Apps | Goals | Apps | Goals | Apps | Goals |
|---|---|---|---|---|---|---|---|---|---|---|---|---|
| Ross County Under 20s | 2016–17 | SPFL Development League | 0 | 0 | 0 | 0 | 0 | 0 | 1 (Note: Appearances in the Scottish Challenge Cup) | 1 | 1 | 1 |
| Ross County Under 20s | 2017–18 | SPFL Development League | 0 | 0 | 0 | 0 | 0 | 0 | 2 | 0 | 2 | 0 |
| Ross County Under 20s | Total | | 0 | 0 | 0 | 0 | 0 | 0 | 3 | 1 | 3 | 1 |
| Ross County | 2015–16 | Scottish Premiership | 2 | 0 | 0 | 0 | 0 | 0 | — | | 2 | 0 |
| Ross County | 2016–17 | Scottish Premiership | 5 | 0 | 0 | 0 | 0 | 0 | 0 | 0 | 5 | 0 |
| Ross County | 2017–18 | Scottish Premiership | 0 | 0 | 0 | 0 | 1 | 0 | 0 | 0 | 1 | 0 |
| Ross County | 2018–19 | Scottish Championship | 0 | 0 | 0 | 0 | 0 | 0 | 1 | 0 | 1 | 0 |
| Ross County | Total | | 7 | 0 | 0 | 0 | 1 | 0 | 1 | 0 | 9 | 0 |
| Dumbarton (loan) | 2017–18 | Scottish Championship | 14 | 1 | 1 | 0 | 0 | 0 | 0 | 0 | 15 | 1 |
| Elgin City (loan) | 2018–19 | Scottish League Two | 33 | 5 | 3 | 1 | 0 | 0 | 0 | 0 | 36 | 6 |
| Career total | | | 54 | 6 | 4 | 1 | 1 | 0 | 4 | 1 | 63 | 8 |
