= Danny Handling =

Scottish footballer (born 1994)

Personal information
- Full name: Daniel Handling
- Date of birth: 6 February 1994 (age 32)
- Place of birth: Edinburgh, Scotland
- Height: 1.83 m (6 ft 0 in)
- Position: Attacking midfielder

Team information
- Current team: Tranent Juniors

Youth career
- Civil Service Strollers
- Hibernian

Senior career*
Years	Team	Apps	(Gls)
2011–2017	Hibernian	55	(3)
2012	→ Berwick Rangers (loan)	7	(7)
2017	→ Raith Rovers (loan)	5	(0)
2017–2018	Dumbarton	16	(2)
2018–2023	Edinburgh City	80	(19)
2023–2024	Brechin City		
2024–	Tranent Juniors	0	(0)

International career
2010–2011	Scotland U17	2	(0)
2014–2015	Scotland U21	3	(0)
- * Club domestic league appearances and goals as of 16:15, 27 May 2022 (UTC)

Daniel Handling (born 6 February 1994) is a Scottish footballer who plays for Tranent Juniors. Handling has previously played for Hibernian and Dumbarton as well as Berwick Rangers and Raith Rovers on loan.

== Early life ==
Handling grew up in Haddington, East Lothian, and attended Knox Academy . His brother, Darren, plays as an attacking midfield player for Dunbar United.

== Career ==
He made his first-team debut for Hibs as a substitute against Aberdeen on 14 May 2011, becoming the fourth-youngest person to play for Hibs. Handling agreed a new contract with Hibs later that year.

Handling was loaned to Third Division club Berwick Rangers in March 2012. He scored two goals on his Berwick debut, a 2–1 win at Peterhead on 24 March. He scored six goals in his first four games for the club, which gave Berwick a chance of qualifying for the end of season playoffs.

Handling made 24 appearances for the Hibs first team in the 2014–15 season, scoring three goals. He then missed all of the 2015–16 season due to suffering a knee injury in a pre-season game. Handling was an unused substitute in a 2016–17 UEFA Europa League tie with Brondby, but then suffered another injury. This prevented him from playing until late January, when he appeared in a development squad match. On 31 March, Handling moved to Raith Rovers on an emergency loan deal.

Having negotiated his release from Hibernian, Handling joined Scottish Championship side Dumbarton in July 2017. He scored his first goal for the club (and first since December 2014) in the semi-final of the Scottish Challenge Cup against Welsh Champions The New Saints in February 2018. After 23 appearances and three goals he turned down a new deal to join Scottish League Two side Edinburgh City. Handling signed a new two-year contract with Edinburgh City in June 2020.

In June 2024, Handling joined Tranent Juniors after a short spell with Brechin City.

== Career statistics ==
As of match played 13 May 2022

Appearances and goals by club, season and competition
Club	Season	League			Cup		League Cup		Other		Total	
Club	Season	Division	Apps	Goals	Apps	Goals	Apps	Goals	Apps	Goals	Apps	Goals
Hibernian	2010–11	Scottish Premier League	1	0	0	0	0	0	0	0	1	0
Hibernian	2011–12	Scottish Premier League	0	0	0	0	0	0	0	0	0	0
Hibernian	2012–13	Scottish Premier League	15	1	3	0	0	0	0	0	18	1
Hibernian	2013–14	Scottish Premiership	19	0	1	1	0	0	2	0	22	1
Hibernian	2014–15	Scottish Championship	20	2	1	0	2	0	1	1	24	3
Hibernian	2015–16	Scottish Championship	0	0	0	0	0	0	0	0	0	0
Hibernian	2016–17	Scottish Championship	0	0	0	0	0	0	0	0	0	0
Hibernian	2017–18	Scottish Premiership	0	0	0	0	0	0	0	0	0	0
Hibernian	Total		55	3	5	1	2	0	3	1	65	5
Berwick Rangers (loan)	2011–12	Scottish Third Division	7	7	0	0	0	0	0	0	7	7
Raith Rovers (loan)	2016–17	Scottish Championship	5	0	0	0	0	0	2	0	7	0
Dumbarton	2017–18	Scottish Championship	16	2	1	0	1	0	5	1	23	3
Edinburgh City	2018–19	Scottish League Two	9	0	0	0	4	0	3	0	16	0
Edinburgh City	2019–20	Scottish League Two	25	10	3	2	4	1	1	0	33	13
Edinburgh City	2020–21	Scottish League Two	16	2	1	0	4	1	4	1	25	4
Edinburgh City	2021–22	Scottish League Two	30	7	3	1	3	0	4	0	41	8
Edinburgh City	Total		80	19	7	3	15	2	12	1	114	25
Career total			163	31	13	4	18	2	22	3	216	40

== Honours ==
=== Player ===
Hibernian

- Scottish Cup winners: 2015–16
- Scottish League Cup runners-up: 2015–16
