= Craig Barr =

Scottish footballer

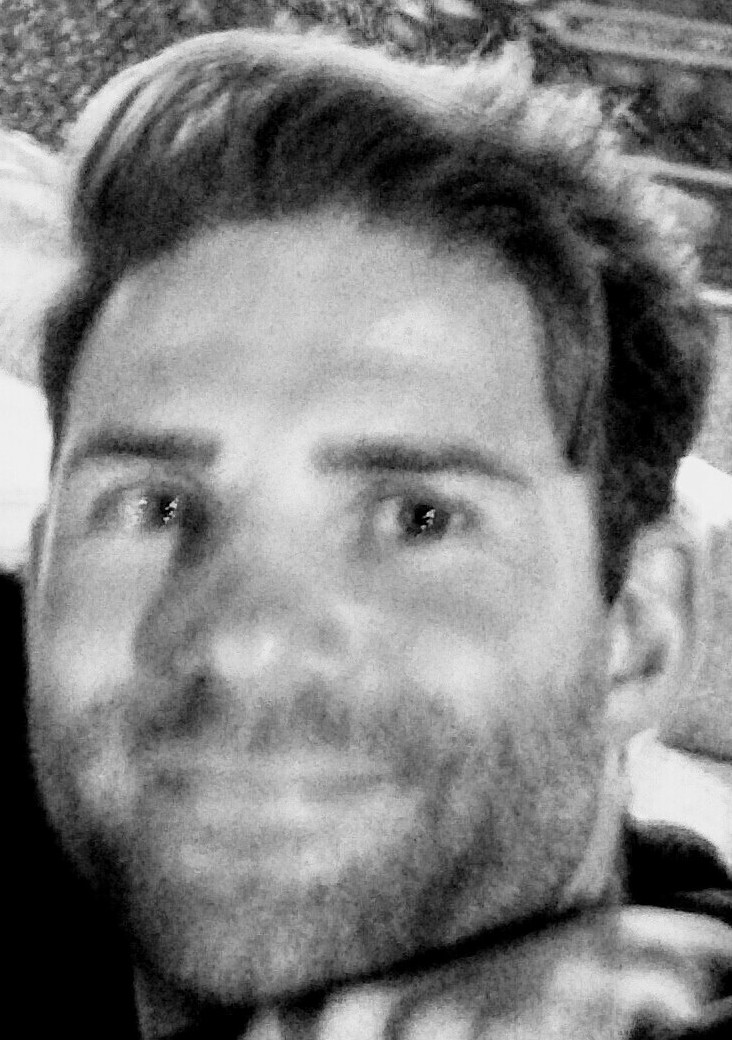

Personal information
- Full name: Craig Mango Barr
- Date of birth: 29 March 1987 (age 39)
- Place of birth: Edinburgh, Scotland
- Position: Defender

Team information
- Current team: Tranent

Youth career
- 2003–2006: Blackburn Rovers

Senior career*
Years	Team	Apps	(Gls)
2006–2008	Gretna	47	(5)
2008–2010	Queen of the South	24	(1)
2010–2013	Livingston	100	(8)
2013	Östersunds FK	13	(1)
2014	Airdrieonians	11	(2)
2014–2017	Raith Rovers	39	(4)
2017–2019	Dumbarton	48	(4)
2019–2022	Cowdenbeath	85	(7)
2022-	Tranent		
- * Club domestic league appearances and goals as of 23:34, 29 October 2020 (UTC)

Craig Barr (born 29 March 1987) is a Scottish footballer who plays as a defender for Tranent. Barr has previously played for Gretna, Queen of the South, Livingston, Airdrieonians, Raith Rovers and Dumbarton, as well as Swedish club Östersunds FK.

== Career ==
=== Early years ===
Born in Edinburgh, Barr moved south as a 16-year-old to join Blackburn Rovers and spent three years with the Lancashire club winning the FA Premier Academy League in 2004–05.

=== Gretna ===
Barr played in the early part of his career with Gretna signing for the club when they were bankrolled by Brooks Mileson. He was part of the squad who won the Scottish Football League First Division in the 2006–07 season which earned them promotion into the SPL. In 47 league appearances for Gretna, Barr scored five goals.

Mileson pulled the plug on the club's cashflow when his health deteriorated. The club thus became financially stricken and went into administration. Administrators for Gretna laid off their last 40 staff including Barr on 19 May 2008.

=== Queen of the South ===
Barr signed a two-year contract with Dumfries-based First Division side Queen of the South on 26 June 2008.

Just after signing, Barr said "I'm really looking forward to the move. Queens are coming off the back of a fantastic season and I'm excited at the prospect of playing for the Scottish Cup finalists. I know big Neilly MacFarlane, Jamie McQuilken and 'Tosher' from my time at Gretna and also have a lot of respect for ex-Queens player, big Derek Townsley, who I also know well".

Barr played both games in Queen of the South's Uefa Cup Second qualifying round against FC Nordsjælland losing out 4-2 on aggregate.

After playing over thirty games in his first season with the club, Barr suffered a season-ending injury on his knee during the pre-season of 2009–10. He had two operations on this injury, with the major one being a complete cruciate reconstruction. As Queens refused to pay for the operation, Barr took it upon himself to fund it. Due to this matter, he then spent the last six months of his contract doing his own rehab away from the club. Barr was among the players announced as released by the club at the end of the 2009–10 season.

=== Livingston ===
Barr signed for Livingston in August 2010. In his first season, he played a pivotal role in helping the club to win the Second Division title. He subsequently signed a new two-year deal, keeping him at the club until the end of season 2012–13.

In his second season, he won the end of season Players' Player of the Year award

Barr left Livingston at the end of the 2012–13 season, following a relatively successful three-year spell with the club making 112 appearances in all competitions.

=== Östersunds FK ===
In July 2013, Barr signed for Swedish Superettan club Östersunds FK, then managed by current Chelsea F.C. manager, Graham Potter.

=== Airdrieonians ===
On 23 February 2014, Barr returned to Scottish football, signing for Airdrieonians on a contract until the end of the 2013–14 season.

=== Raith Rovers ===
In summer 2014, Barr joined Raith Rovers. He left the club in June 2017, following their relegation to Scottish League One.

=== Dumbarton ===
Having left Raith, Barr joined Scottish Championship side Dumbarton on a two-year deal in June 2017. He scored his first goal for the club in a 2–1 defeat to Clyde in July 2017. He won the club's Players' Player of the Year award in his first season at the Rock and captained the side on a number of occasions. Barr turned down a new deal and left the club in May 2019 after an injury hit second season.

=== Cowdenbeath ===
On 11 June 2019, Barr signed for Scottish League Two club Cowdenbeath. In his first couple of months at the club, Barr was voted as Ladbrokes Player of the Month for September for the whole of League 2. Barr won historic back-to-back awards for the first time since 1952 as he was named Player of the Year and Players' Player of the Year for two consecutive season's in a row.

=== Tranent ===
Barr signed for Tranent in 2022.

== Career statistics ==
As of 17 September 2019

Appearances and goals by club, season and competition
Club	Season	League			National Cup		League Cup		Other		Total	
Club	Season	Division	Apps	Goals	Apps	Goals	Apps	Goals	Apps	Goals	Apps	Goals
Gretna	2007–08	Scottish Premier League	26	4	1	0	1	1	0	0	28	5
Queen of the South	2008–09	Scottish First Division	24	1	1	0	1	0	5 (Note: Three appearances and one goal in the Scottish Challenge Cup and two appearances in the UEFA Cup)	1	31	2
Queen of the South	2009–10	Scottish First Division	0	0	0	0	0	0	1 (Note: Appearances in the Scottish Challenge Cup)	0	1	0
Queen of the South	Total		24	1	1	0	1	0	6	1	32	2
Livingston	2010–11	Scottish Second Division	33	2	1	0	1	0	0	0	35	2
Livingston	2011–12	Scottish First Division	35	2	2	0	2	0	2	0	41	2
Livingston	2012–13	Scottish First Division	32	4	1	0	2	0	0	0	35	4
Livingston	Total		100	8	4	0	5	0	2	0	111	8
Östersunds FK	2013	Superettan	13	1	0	0	0	0	0	0	13	1
Airdrieonians	2013–14	Scottish League One	11	2	0	0	0	0	0	0	11	2
Raith Rovers	2014–15	Scottish Championship	12	1	1	0	0	0	0	0	13	1
Raith Rovers	2015–16	Scottish Championship	12	1	0	0	0	0	2 (Note: Appearances in the Scottish Premiership play-offs)	0	14	1
Raith Rovers	2016–17	Scottish Championship	15	2	0	0	0	0	2 (Note: Appearances in the Scottish Championship play-offs)	0	17	2
Raith Rovers	Total		39	4	1	0	0	0	4	0	44	4
Dumbarton	2017–18	Scottish Championship	32	2	3	0	3	1	8 (Note: Six appearances and one goal in the Scottish Challenge Cup and two appearances and one goal in the Scottish Championship play-offs)	2	46	5
Dumbarton	2018–19	Scottish League One	16	2	0	0	4	1	1	0	21	3
Dumbarton	Total		48	4	3	0	7	2	9	2	67	8
Cowdenbeath	2019–20	Scottish League Two	6	1	0	0	3	0	1	1	10	2
Career total			267	25	10	0	17	3	22	4	316	32
