= David Wilson (footballer, born 1994) =

Scottish footballer

Personal information
- Date of birth: 6 September 1994 (age 32)
- Place of birth: Glasgow, Scotland
- Height: 6 ft 0 in (1.83 m)
- Position: Midfielder

Youth career
- 2011–2013: Partick Thistle

Senior career*
Years	Team	Apps	(Gls)
2013–2017	Partick Thistle	19	(0)
2017	→ Stranraer (loan)	13	(0)
2017–2018	Dumbarton	22	(0)
2018–2019	Annan Athletic	36	(5)
2019–2021	Stirling Albion	40	(4)
2021–22	Albion Rovers	33	(3)
2022–2025	Dumbarton	73	(5)
- * Club domestic league appearances and goals as of 15:45, 3 May 2025 (UTC)

David Wilson (born 6 September 1994) is a Scottish professional footballer who plays as a midfielder and last played for Scottish League Two club Dumbarton.

== Career ==
Wilson joined Partick Thistle in the summer of 2011, and made his senior debut for the club on 1 January 2014. He signed a new one-year contract in June 2014. He signed on loan for Stranraer in January 2017. Wilson left Firhill in May 2017, after his contract with the club was not renewed. After leaving Thistle, Wilson signed a one-year deal with Scottish Championship club Dumbarton on 26 June 2017. He scored his first senior goal for the Sons, in a 2–1 Scottish Challenge Cup victory over Connah's Quay Nomads. Wilson was released by Dumbarton at the end of the 2017–18 season and joined Scottish League Two side Annan Athletic.

After playing with Stirling Albion, he signed for Albion Rovers in 2021. He returned for a second spell at Dumbarton in May 2022. He signed a two-year contract extension in April 2023. His second spell at the club ended in May 2025, with Wilson having played 131 times across his two stints with the club.

== Career statistics ==
As of 15:45, 3 May 2025 (UTC)

Appearances and goals by club, season and competition
Club	Season	League			Scottish Cup		League Cup		Other		Total	
Club	Season	Division	Apps	Goals	Apps	Goals	Apps	Goals	Apps	Goals	Apps	Goals
Partick Thistle	2013–14	Scottish Premiership	1	0	0	0	0	0	0	0	1	0
Partick Thistle	2014–15	Scottish Premiership	6	0	0	0	0	0	0	0	6	0
Partick Thistle	2015–16	Scottish Premiership	11	0	0	0	1	0	0	0	12	0
Partick Thistle	2016–17	Scottish Premiership	1	0	0	0	3	0	0	0	4	0
Partick Thistle	Total		19	0	0	0	4	0	0	0	23	0
Stranraer (loan)	2016–17	Scottish League One	13	0	1	0	0	0	0	0	14	0
Dumbarton	2017–18	Scottish Championship	22	0	2	0	4	0	4 (Note: Appearance(s) in the Scottish Challenge Cup)	1	32	1
Annan Athletic	2018–19	Scottish League Two	36	5	3	1	4	2	4 (Note: Appearance(s) in the League One play-offs)	0	47	8
Stirling Albion	2019–20	Scottish League Two	24	2	1	0	4	2	0	0	29	4
Stirling Albion	2020–21	Scottish League Two	16	2	1	0	4	0	0	0	21	2
Stirling Albion	Total		40	4	2	0	8	2	0	0	50	6
Albion Rovers	2021–22	Scottish League Two	33	3	3	1	3	1	1	0	40	5
Dumbarton	2022–23	Scottish League Two	24	3	3	1	4	0	3	0	34	4
Dumbarton	2023–24	Scottish League Two	27	2	2	0	4	0	5	0	38	2
Dumbarton	2024–25	Scottish League One	22	0	0	0	3	0	2	1	27	1
Dumbarton	Total (both spells)		95	5	7	1	15	0	14	2	131	8
Career total			236	17	16	3	34	5	19	1	303	27
