= Your Radio =

Coordinates: 55.9402°N 4.5552°W

- Dumbarton; Scotland
- Broadcast area: Argyll & Bute, Inverclyde, West Dunbartonshire
- Frequencies: FM: 103 MHz and 106.9 MHz; DAB: 10B

Programming
- Format: Classic and current hits

Ownership
- Owner: Nation Broadcasting

History
- First air date: 30 November 2003
- Last air date: 31 March 2020

Links
- Website: Nation Radio

YOUR Radio (formerly Castle Rock FM) was an Independent Local Radio station, serving Argyll & Bute, Inverclyde and West Dunbartonshire. It was VT (Voice Tracked) and was owned and operated by Nation Broadcasting Group. The station ceased operations in 2018.

Since 31 March 2020, the station had been relaying Nation Radio Scotland on its transmitters as a response to UK government restrictions due to the COVID-19 pandemic.

== Overview ==
Originally broadcast as Castle Rock FM, the Dumbarton-based licence relaunched as YOUR Radio when it expanded its coverage area to Helensburgh (broadcasting on 106.9 FM). Previously owned by Clyde and Forth Press, it was sold onto Romanes Media Group, until the firm was bought by Newsquest in August 2015. Three months later, the station was bought out for an undisclosed sum by directors Gary Marshall and Spencer Pryor. On 6 September 2018 Nation Radio took ownership of Your Radio.

On 1 April 2020, YOUR Radio became Nation Radio Scotland.
