= Dimitris Froxylias =

Greek footballer (born 1993)

Personal information
- Full name: Dimitrios Froxylias
- Date of birth: 28 June 1993 (age 33)
- Place of birth: Larissa, Greece
- Height: 1.75 m (5 ft 9 in)
- Position: Attacking midfielder

Team information
- Current team: PAC Omonia 29M
- Number: 10

Youth career
- Toxotis Larissa
- APOEL
- AEK Athens

Senior career*
Years	Team	Apps	(Gls)
2010–2012	AEK Athens	1	(0)
2011–2012	→ Fokikos (loan)	8	(0)
2013–2014	Apollon Limassol	5	(0)
2014	→ Ethnikos Achna (loan)	17	(1)
2014–2015	AEK Larnaca	5	(0)
2015–2016	Enosis Neon Paralimni	19	(2)
2016	Nea Salamina	1	(0)
2017	Ermis Aradippou	5	(1)
2017–2018	Dumbarton	23	(4)
2018	Falkirk	4	(0)
2019–2020	Haringey Borough	15	(3)
2020	Panachaiki	6	(0)
2020	Onisilos Sotira 2014	3	(0)
2021–	PAC Omonia 29M	0	(0)

International career
2011–2012	Cyprus U19	3	(0)
2013–2014	Cyprus U21	6	(1)
2018	Cyprus	2	(0)
- * Club domestic league appearances and goals as of 15:45, 20 January 2020 (UTC)

Dimitris Froxylias (Greek: Δημήτρης Φροξυλιάς; born 28 June 1993) is a Cypriot professional footballer who plays as an attacking midfielder for PAC Omonia 29M.

== Club career ==
Born in Larissa, Greece, Froxylias began his early career in 2005, aged 12, at Toxotis Larissa's youth team. He continued in APOEL and in July 2007, he moved to AEK Athens youth academy after Toni Savevski's recommendation.

In October 2009, he was selected by coach Dušan Bajević to begin training with AEK's first squad. In January 2010, at the age of sixteen, he signed a three-year contract with AEK. Froxylias made his first appearance for the club, as a substitute for Panagiotis Lagos, during a UEFA Europa League match with R.S.C. Anderlecht on 4 November 2010, becoming the youngest player ever to wear the club's shirt in a European club football match, at the age of seventeen.

He signed a deal until January with Scottish Championship side Dumbarton on deadline day, 2017, scoring an extra-time free-kick winner on his debut against Connah's Quay Nomads. He followed that up by scoring another late winner on his home league debut, this time against Brechin City on 16 September 2017. After a series of impressive performances, he agreed a deal until the summer of 2018 with the club in October 2017.

Froxylias scored a stunning late free-kick winner for the Sons against Welsh Champions The New Saints - a goal that sent Dumbarton into a national cup final for the first time in over 100 years. He left the club at the end of his contract in May 2018 and signed for Scottish Championship club Falkirk. After just eight appearances he left the club in October 2018. After a spell out of the game Froxylias joined English Isthmian League side Haringey Borough, joining up with international teammate Georgios Aresti.

== International career ==
Froxylias was called up to the Cyprus national football team for the first time in March 2018 for their friendly against Montenegro, becoming the first Dumbarton player since Harry Chatton in 1932 to receive full international honours.

== Personal life ==
Froxylias holds passports from both Greece and Cyprus, since his mother originates from Cypriot village Agios Epifanios. He decided to join the Cypriot national team.

== Career statistics ==
As of 22:38, 24 February 2019 (UTC)

Appearances and goals by club, season and competition
Club	Season	League			National Cup		League Cup		Other		Total	
Club	Season	Division	Apps	Goals	Apps	Goals	Apps	Goals	Apps	Goals	Apps	Goals
AEK Athens	2010–11	Super League Greece	0	0	0	0	—		1 (Note: Appearance in the Europa League)	0	1	0
Fokikos (loan)	2011–12	Greek Football League	8	0	0	0	—		—		8	0
Apollon Limassol	2012–13	Cypriot First Division	6	0	0	0	—		0	0	6	0
Apollon Limassol	2013–14	Cypriot First Division	2	0	0	0	—		0	0	2	0
Apollon Limassol	Total		8	0	0	0	—		0	0	8	0
Ethnikos Achna (loan)	2013–14	Cypriot First Division	17	1	1	0	—		—		18	1
AEK Larnaca	2014–15	Cypriot First Division	5	0	0	0	—		0	0	5	0
Enosis	2015–16	Cypriot First Division	19	2	0	0	—		—		19	2
Nea Salamis	2016–17	Cypriot First Division	1	0	0	0	—		—		1	0
Ermis	2016–17	Cypriot First Division	5	1	0	0	—		—		5	1
Dumbarton	2017–18	Scottish Championship	23	4	2	0	0	0	4 (Note: Appearances in the Scottish Challenge Cup)	2	29	6
Falkirk	2018–19	Scottish Championship	4	0	0	0	2	0	2	0	8	0
Haringey Borough	2018–19	Isthmian League Premier Division	2	0	0	0	0	0	1 (Note: Appearances in the Isthmian League Playoffs)	0	3	0
Haringey Borough	2019–20	Isthmian League Premier Division	13	3	3	2	1	1	3 (Note: Appearances in the FA Trophy)	1	20	7
Panachaiki	2019–20	Super League Greece 2	6	0	0	0	—		—		6	0
Onisilos Sotira 2014	2020–21	Cypriot Second Division	3	0	0	0	—		—		3	0
Career total			114	11	6	2	3	1	11	3	134	17
