= Christopher McLaughlin =

Scottish footballer

Personal information
- Full name: Christopher McLaughlin
- Date of birth: 22 March 1998 (age 28)
- Place of birth: Glasgow, Scotland
- Height: 6 ft 1 in (1.85 m)
- Position: Left-back

Youth career
- Dundee United

Senior career*
Years	Team	Apps	(Gls)
2015–2017	Ross County	3	(0)
2017	→ Forfar Athletic (loan)	14	(0)
2017–2018	Dumbarton	23	(0)
2018–2019	Stirling Lions		
2019–2020	Brechin City	14	(0)
2020–2021	East Kilbride		
- * Club domestic league appearances and goals as of 23:17, 23 May 2021 (UTC)

Christopher McLaughlin (born 22 March 1998) is a Scottish professional footballer.

== Career ==
After beginning his career with Dundee United, McLaughlin signed for Ross County in July 2015. He moved on loan to Forfar Athletic in January 2017.

Having left Ross County in the summer of 2017, McLaughlin signed for Scottish Championship side Dumbarton on a one-year contract. He scored his first senior goal for the Sons, the opener in a 2–1 Scottish Challenge Cup victory over Raith Rovers in November 2017. After winning the club's Young Player of the Year award he left on the expiry of his contract following the Sons relegation to Scottish League One.

McLaughlin signed for National Premier Leagues Western Australia side Stirling Lions SC on a short-term contract in July 2018. He then signed for Brechin City in June 2019.

McLaughlin signed for East Kilbride in November 2020.

== Career statistics ==
As of 23 May 2021

Appearances and goals by club, season and competition
Club	Season	League			Scottish Cup		Scottish League Cup		Other		Total	
Club	Season	Division	Apps	Goals	Apps	Goals	Apps	Goals	Apps	Goals	Apps	Goals
Ross County	2015–16	Scottish Premiership	2	0	0	0	0	0	—		2	0
Ross County	2016–17	Scottish Premiership	1	0	0	0	0	0	—		1	0
Ross County	Total		3	0	0	0	0	0	0	0	3	0
Forfar Athletic (loan)	2016–17	Scottish League Two	14	0	0	0	0	0	4 (Note: Appearances in the League One play-offs)	0	18	0
Dumbarton	2017–18	Scottish Championship	23	0	0	0	4	0	5 (Note: Appearances in the Scottish Challenge Cup)	1	32	1
Brechin City	2019–20	Scottish League Two	14	0	2	0	3	0	1	0	20	0
Career total			54	0	2	0	7	0	19	0	73	1
