= 2026–27 Partick Thistle F.C. season =

Partick Thistle
2025–26 season
- Chairman: Richard Beastall
- Head coach: Mark Wilson
- Stadium: Firhill Stadium
- League Cup: Second round
- Scottish Cup: Third round
- Challenge Cup: Third round

The 2026–27 season is Partick Thistle's sixth season back in the Scottish Championship, having been promoted from League One at the end of the 2020–21 season. Thistle will also compete in the League Cup, Challenge Cup, Scottish Cup and Glasgow Cup.

== Results and fixtures ==
Win Draw Loss Postponed

=== Pre-season ===
| 27 June 2026 Friendly | Pollok | 0–0 | Partick Thistle | Newlandsfield Park |
| 15:00 | | Report |

| 30 June 2026 Friendly | Partick Thistle | 8–0 | Kilbirnie Ladeside | Petershill Park |
| 19:30 | Reading 14'; Fitzpatrick 26'; Lets'osa 29'; O'Reilly 35'; Drozd 67', 70'; Gray 82'; Low 85' | Report |

| 26 July 2026 Nicky Little testimonial | Clydebank | 2–2 | Partick Thistle XI | Holm Park |
| 15:00 |

=== Scottish Championship ===
| 1 August 2026 1 | Greenock Morton | 0–1 | Partick Thistle | Cappielow |
| 15:00 | | Report | Lets'osa 82' | Attendance: 3,143; Referee: Jamie Wilkie |

| 7 August 2026 2 | Partick Thistle | 2–0 | Livingston | Firhill Stadium |
| 19:45 | Crawford 4'; MacPherson 44' (o.g.) | Report | | Attendance: 3,939; Referee: Dan McFarlane |

| 21 August 2026 3 | Inverness CT | 1–1 | Partick Thistle | Caledonian Stadium |
| 19:45 | Bavidge 89' | Report | Drozd 17' | Attendance: 2,809; Referee: Chris Graham |

| 29 August 2026 4 | Partick Thistle | 0–0 | Queen's Park | Firhill Stadium |
| 19:45 | | Report | | Attendance: 3,911; Referee: Calum Scott |

| 5 September 2026 5 | Partick Thistle | 1–0 | Ayr United | Firhill Stadium |
| 15:00 | Drozd 38' | Report | | Attendance: 3,869; Referee: Nick Walsh |

| 15 September 2026 6 | Stenhousemuir | 1–0 | Partick Thistle | Ochilview Park |
| 19:45 | Kargbo 76' | Report | | Attendance: 1,774; Referee: Sean Murdoch |

| 19 September 2026 7 | Partick Thistle | 0–0 | Raith Rovers | Firhill Stadium |
| 15:00 | | Report | | Attendance: 4,514; Referee: Cameron Stirling |

| 3 October 2026 8 | Partick Thistle | 3–0 | Arbroath | Firhill Stadium |
| 15:00 | Stanway 7', 20'; Reid 69' (o.g.) | Report | | Attendance: 4,066; Referee: Jamie Wilkie |

| 10 October 2026 9 | Livingston | 1–2 | Partick Thistle | Almondvale Stadium |
| 15:00 | van Hoeven 44' | Report | Reading 17'; Watt 62' | Attendance: 2,339; Referee: Calum Scott |

| 16 October 2026 10 | Ayr United | 0–1 | Partick Thistle | Somerset Park |
| 19:45 | | Report | Smyth 45' (pen.) | Attendance: 2,445; Referee: Matthew MacDermid |

| 20 October 2026 11 | Dunfermline Athletic | 1–1 | Partick Thistle | East End Park |
| 19:45 | A.Tod 41' | Report | Watt 13' | Attendance: 5,427; Referee: Peter Stuart |

| 24 October 2026 12 | Partick Thistle | 3–0 | Stenhousemuir | Firhill Stadium |
| 15:00 | Henderson 7', 25', 56' | Report | | Attendance: 4,068; Referee: Calum Scott |

| 31 October 2026 13 | Partick Thistle | 2–3 | Greenock Morton | Firhill Stadium |
| 15:00 | Ashcroft 14'; Watt 35' | Report | Garrity 3'; Sandilands 59', 68' | Attendance: 3,811; Referee: Colin Steven |

| 7 November 2026 14 | Queen's Park | 0–1 | Partick Thistle | Lesser Hampden |
| 15:00 | | Report | Watt 55' | Attendance: 909; Referee: Cameron Stirling |

| 14 November 2026 15 | Partick Thistle | 3–2 | Inverness CT | Firhill Stadium |
| 15:00 | Smyth 39' (pen.), 44' (pen.); Watt 61' | Report | Allan 84'; MacGregor 85' | Attendance: 4,658; Referee: Lewis Hogarth |

| 21 November 2026 16 | Raith Rovers | 0–2 | Partick Thistle | Stark's Park |
| 15:00 | Adamson (red card) 58' | Report | Loughrey 60'; Henderson 76' | Attendance: 3,661; Referee: Colin Steven |

=== Scottish League Cup ===
==== Group stage ====
| 11 July 2026 Group stage | Partick Thistle | 6–0 | Brechin City | Firhill Stadium |
| 15:00 | Mackay-Steven 7', 28'; Smyth 22' (pen.); Fitzpatrick 58'; Drozd 66'; Henderson 67' | Report | | Attendance: 2,063; Referee: Steven McLean |

| 14 July 2026 Group stage | Forfar Athletic | 0–4 | Partick Thistle | Station Park |
| 19:45 | | Report | Drozd 4' (pen.); Samuel 6'; O'Reilly 16'; Lets'osa 90+1' | Attendance: 467; Referee: Sean Murdoch |

| 18 July 2026 Group stage | Livingston | 1–1 (2–3 p) | Partick Thistle | Almondvale Stadium |
| 15:00 | Muirhead 60' | Report | Samuel 80' | Attendance: 1,536; Referee: Josh Hay |

| 21 July 2026 Group stage | Partick Thistle | 2–2 (3–5 p) | Stenhousemuir | Firhill Stadium |
| 19:45 | Smyth 33'; Watt 81' | Report | O'Reilly 6' (pen.); Penman 23' | Attendance: 2,046; Referee: Daniel Graves |

==== Knockout phase ====
| 16 August 2026 Second round | Hibernian | 1–0 | Partick Thistle | Easter Road |
| 14:00 | Elding 12' | Report | | Attendance: 10,608; Referee: Duncan Nicolson |

=== Scottish Challenge Cup ===
==== Knockout phase ====
| 3 November 2026 Second round | Edinburgh City | 0–3 | Partick Thistle | Meadowbank Stadium |
| 19:45 | Foster (red card) 29' | Report | Samuel 45'; Stanway 45+3'; Drozd 87' | Referee: Peter Stuart |

| 24 November 2026 Third round | East Kilbride | v | Partick Thistle | K-Park Training Academy |
| 19:45 |

=== Scottish Cup ===
| 28 November 2026 Third round | Elgin City | v | Partick Thistle | Borough Briggs |
| 15:00 |

== Squad statistics ==
=== Player statistics ===
As of 21 November 2026 (UTC)

| No. | Pos | Nat | Player | Total | | Championship | | League Cup | | Challenge Cup | | Scottish Cup | | Glasgow Cup | |
| No. | Pos | Nat | Player | Apps | Goals | Apps | Goals | Apps | Goals | Apps | Goals | Apps | Goals | Apps | Goals |
|---|---|---|---|---|---|---|---|---|---|---|---|---|---|---|---|
| 1 | GK | (Scotland) SCO | Lewis Budinauckas | 9 | 0 | 5+0 | 0 | 3+0 | 0 | 1+0 | 0 | 0+0 | 0 | 0+0 | 0 |
| 2 | DF | (Scotland) SCO | Cammy Logan | 9 | 0 | 2+2 | 0 | 3+1 | 0 | 1+0 | 0 | 0+0 | 0 | 0+0 | 0 |
| 3 | DF | (Scotland) SCO | Paddy Reading | 20 | 1 | 16+0 | 1 | 4+0 | 0 | 0+0 | 0 | 0+0 | 0 | 0+0 | 0 |
| 5 | DF | (Scotland) SCO | Lee Ashcroft | 12 | 1 | 10+0 | 1 | 2+0 | 0 | 0+0 | 0 | 0+0 | 0 | 0+0 | 0 |
| 6 | MF | (England) ENG | Ben Dempsey | 15 | 0 | 8+5 | 0 | 0+1 | 0 | 0+1 | 0 | 0+0 | 0 | 0+0 | 0 |
| 7 | FW | (England) ENG | Seb Drozd | 22 | 5 | 14+2 | 2 | 3+2 | 2 | 0+1 | 1 | 0+0 | 0 | 0+0 | 0 |
| 8 | MF | (Northern Ireland) NIR | Oisin Smyth | 18 | 5 | 14+0 | 3 | 3+0 | 2 | 0+1 | 0 | 0+0 | 0 | 0+0 | 0 |
| 9 | FW | (Wales) WAL | Alex Samuel | 21 | 3 | 6+9 | 0 | 2+3 | 2 | 1+0 | 1 | 0+0 | 0 | 0+0 | 0 |
| 10 | FW | (Scotland) SCO | Euan Henderson | 18 | 5 | 7+6 | 4 | 3+1 | 1 | 1+0 | 0 | 0+0 | 0 | 0+0 | 0 |
| 11 | MF | (Scotland) SCO | Gary Mackay-Steven | 11 | 2 | 2+5 | 0 | 2+2 | 2 | 0+0 | 0 | 0+0 | 0 | 0+0 | 0 |
| 12 | GK | (Scotland) SCO | Liam McFarlane | 13 | 0 | 11+0 | 0 | 2+0 | 0 | 0+0 | 0 | 0+0 | 0 | 0+0 | 0 |
| 14 | MF | (Scotland) SCO | Robbie Crawford | 19 | 1 | 7+6 | 1 | 5+0 | 0 | 1+0 | 0 | 0+0 | 0 | 0+0 | 0 |
| 17 | DF | (England) ENG | Ethan Ingram | 13 | 0 | 2+9 | 0 | 0+1 | 0 | 1+0 | 0 | 0+0 | 0 | 0+0 | 0 |
| 20 | DF | (Republic of Ireland) IRL | Daniel O'Reilly | 14 | 1 | 8+1 | 0 | 4+1 | 1 | 0+0 | 0 | 0+0 | 0 | 0+0 | 0 |
| 21 | MF | (Scotland) SCO | Aidan Fitzpatrick | 21 | 1 | 10+5 | 0 | 3+2 | 1 | 1+0 | 0 | 0+0 | 0 | 0+0 | 0 |
| 22 | DF | (Canada) CAN | Cale Loughrey | 20 | 1 | 14+0 | 1 | 4+1 | 0 | 1+0 | 0 | 0+0 | 0 | 0+0 | 0 |
| 24 | DF | (Scotland) SCO | Ben McPherson | 14 | 0 | 12+0 | 0 | 1+0 | 0 | 1+0 | 0 | 0+0 | 0 | 0+0 | 0 |
| 26 | MF | (Scotland) SCO | Ben Stanway | 15 | 3 | 11+2 | 2 | 0+1 | 0 | 1+0 | 1 | 0+0 | 0 | 0+0 | 0 |
| 31 | DF | (Scotland) SCO | Jamie Low | 2 | 0 | 0+0 | 0 | 1+0 | 0 | 0+1 | 0 | 0+0 | 0 | 0+0 | 0 |
| 32 | FW | (Scotland) SCO | Tony Watt | 20 | 6 | 9+6 | 5 | 3+1 | 1 | 0+1 | 0 | 0+0 | 0 | 0+0 | 0 |
| 34 | MF | (Scotland) SCO | Stephen Docherty | 1 | 0 | 0+0 | 0 | 0+1 | 0 | 0+0 | 0 | 0+0 | 0 | 0+0 | 0 |
| 40 | MF | (Scotland) SCO | Nick Lockhart | 0 | 0 | 0+0 | 0 | 0+0 | 0 | 0+0 | 0 | 0+0 | 0 | 0+0 | 0 |
| 44 | FW | (Scotland) SCO | Daniel Gray | 0 | 0 | 0+0 | 0 | 0+0 | 0 | 0+0 | 0 | 0+0 | 0 | 0+0 | 0 |
| 64 | MF | (Scotland) SCO | Ts'oanelo Lets'osa | 18 | 2 | 7+5 | 1 | 4+1 | 1 | 1+0 | 0 | 0+0 | 0 | 0+0 | 0 |
Players who departed the club during the 2026–27 season:
| – | GK | (Northern Ireland) NIR | Josh Clarke | 0 | 0 | 0+0 | 0 | 0+0 | 0 | 0+0 | 0 | 0+0 | 0 | 0+0 | 0 |
| 18 | FW | (Scotland) SCO | Ricco Diack | 0 | 0 | 0+0 | 0 | 0+0 | 0 | 0+0 | 0 | 0+0 | 0 | 0+0 | 0 |
| 25 | MF | (Scotland) SCO | Matthew Falconer | 5 | 0 | 0+1 | 0 | 2+2 | 0 | 0+0 | 0 | 0+0 | 0 | 0+0 | 0 |
| 27 | GK | (Scotland) SCO | Conor Storey | 0 | 0 | 0+0 | 0 | 0+0 | 0 | 0+0 | 0 | 0+0 | 0 | 0+0 | 0 |
| 29 | DF | (Scotland) SCO | Liam Rooney | 0 | 0 | 0+0 | 0 | 0+0 | 0 | 0+0 | 0 | 0+0 | 0 | 0+0 | 0 |
| 30 | DF | (Scotland) SCO | Liam Dolan | 1 | 0 | 0+0 | 0 | 0+1 | 0 | 0+0 | 0 | 0+0 | 0 | 0+0 | 0 |
| 37 | FW | (Scotland) SCO | Thomas Horn | 1 | 0 | 0+0 | 0 | 0+1 | 0 | 0+0 | 0 | 0+0 | 0 | 0+0 | 0 |

== Club statistics ==
=== League table ===
| Pos | Team | Pld | W | D | L | GF | GA | GD | Pts | Promotion, qualification or relegation |
|---|---|---|---|---|---|---|---|---|---|---|
| 1 | Partick Thistle | 16 | 10 | 4 | 2 | 23 | 9 | +14 | 34 | Promotion to the Premiership |
| 2 | Livingston | 16 | 8 | 3 | 5 | 25 | 13 | +12 | 27 | Qualification for the Premiership play-off semi-final |
| 3 | Stenhousemuir | 16 | 8 | 2 | 6 | 19 | 18 | +1 | 26 | Qualification for the Premiership play-off quarter-final |
| 4 | Dunfermline Athletic | 14 | 6 | 7 | 1 | 15 | 7 | +8 | 25 | Qualification for the Premiership play-off quarter-final |
| 5 | Raith Rovers | 16 | 7 | 4 | 5 | 21 | 14 | +7 | 25 | |

Updated to match(es) played on 21 November 2026. Source:
Rules for classification: 1) Points; 2) Goal difference; 3) Goals scored; 4) Head-to head points; 5) Head-to-head goal difference; 6) Play-off (only for deciding promotion, play-off participation and relegation).

=== League Cup table ===
| Pos | Team | Pld | W | PW | PL | L | GF | GA | GD | Pts | Qualification | STE | PAR | LIV | FOR | BRE |
|---|---|---|---|---|---|---|---|---|---|---|---|---|---|---|---|---|
| 1 | Stenhousemuir | 4 | 2 | 2 | 0 | 0 | 6 | 3 | +3 | 10 | Qualification for the second round | — | — | p0–0 | 2–0 | — |
| 2 | Partick Thistle | 4 | 2 | 1 | 1 | 0 | 13 | 3 | +10 | 9 | Qualification for the second round | 2–2p | — | — | — | 6–0 |
| 3 | Livingston | 4 | 2 | 0 | 2 | 0 | 11 | 1 | +10 | 8 | | — | 1–1p | — | 8–0 | — |
| 4 | Forfar Athletic | 4 | 1 | 0 | 0 | 3 | 3 | 15 | −12 | 3 | | — | 0–4 | — | — | 3–1 |
| 5 | Brechin City | 4 | 0 | 0 | 0 | 4 | 2 | 13 | −11 | 0 | | 1–2 | — | 0–2 | — | — |

Rules for classification: 1) goal difference, 2) goals scored, 3) away goals scored, 4) matches won, 5) away matches won, 6) drawing of lots.

== Transfers ==
=== In ===
| Date | Position | Nationality | Name | From | Fee |
|---|---|---|---|---|---|
| 29 May 2026 | GK | (Northern Ireland) | Josh Clarke | (Scotland) Celtic | Free |
| 29 May 2026 | DF | (Scotland) | Ben McPherson | (Scotland) Celtic | Free |
| 4 June 2026 | MF | (Northern Ireland) | Oisin Smyth | (Scotland) St Mirren | Free |
| 4 June 2026 | FW | (Scotland) | Euan Henderson | (Scotland) Hamilton Academical | Free |
| 10 June 2026 | MF | (England) | Ben Dempsey | (Scotland) Ayr United | Free |
| 17 June 2026 | MF | (England) | Seb Drozd | (Scotland) Queen's Park | Free |
| 9 July 2026 | DF | (England) | Ethan Ingram | (Scotland) Dundee | Free |

=== Out ===
| Date | Position | Nationality | Name | To | Fee |
|---|---|---|---|---|---|
| 29 May 2026 | MF | (Scotland) | Scott Martin | (Scotland) Queen's Park | Free |
| 4 June 2026 | MF | (Scotland) | Kyle Turner | (Scotland) Raith Rovers | Free |
| 21 June 2026 | FW | (Scotland) | Logan Chalmers | (Scotland) St Johnstone | Free |
| 23 June 2026 | MF | (Scotland) | Zander MacKenzie | (Scotland) Queen of the South | Free |
| 29 June 2026 | DF | (Scotland) | Luke McBeth | (Scotland) Ayr United | Undisclosed |
| 7 August 2026 | MF | (Scotland) | Daniel MacKay | (Scotland) Inverness Caledonian Thistle | Free |

=== Loans in ===
| Date | Position | Nationality | Name | From | Fee |
|---|---|---|---|---|---|
| 17 July 2026 | GK | (Scotland) | Liam McFarlane | (Scotland) Heart of Midlothian | Loan |

=== Loans out ===
| Date | Position | Nationality | Name | To | Fee |
|---|---|---|---|---|---|
| 7 July 2026 | GK | (Northern Ireland) | Josh Clarke | (England) Doncaster Rovers | Loan (Note: Clarke has initially joined Rovers on loan from Thistle, with the deal expected to be made permanent in January 2027 for an undisclosed fee.) |
| 10 July 2026 | DF | (Scotland) | Liam Rooney | (Scotland) Clyde | Loan |
| 26 July 2026 | GK | (Scotland) | Connor Storey | (Scotland) Pollok | Loan (Note: Short-term loan.) |
| 7 August 2026 | DF | (Scotland) | Liam Dolan | (Scotland) Albion Rovers | Loan |
| 29 August 2026 | FW | (Scotland) | Thomas Horn | (Scotland) Cumbernauld Colts | Loan |
| 31 August 2026 | FW | (Scotland) | Ricco Diack | (Scotland) Ross County | Loan |
| 31 August 2026 | MF | (Scotland) | Matthew Falconer | (Scotland) Kelty Hearts | Loan |

== See also ==
- List of Partick Thistle F.C. seasons
