= 2025–26 Partick Thistle F.C. season =

Partick Thistle
2025–26 season
- Chairman: Richard Beastall
- Head coach: Mark Wilson
- Stadium: Firhill Stadium
- Scottish Championship: 2nd
- Premiership play-offs: Runners-up
- Scottish Cup: Quarter-finals
- League Cup: Quarter-finals
- Challenge Cup: Third round
- Glasgow Cup: Semi-finals
- Top goalscorer: League: Alex Samuel (9); All: Logan Chalmers; Alex Samuel (13)
- Highest home attendance: 8,817 vs. Celtic, League Cup, 20 September 2025
- Lowest home attendance: 1,370 vs. Inverness CT, Challenge Cup, 13 January 2026
- Average home league attendance: 3,793
Home colours

The 2025–26 season was Partick Thistle's fifth season back in the Scottish Championship, having been promoted from League One at the end of the 2020–21 season. Thistle also competed in the League Cup, Challenge Cup, Scottish Cup and Glasgow Cup.

== Results and fixtures ==
Win Draw Loss Postponed

=== Pre-season ===
28 June 2025 Friendly	Glenafton Athletic	1–3	Partick Thistle	Loch Park
14:00	Lindsay 56'	Report	Falconer 25'; Trialist 45'; Horn 58'

1 July 2025 Friendly	Partick Thistle	3–2	Inverness CT	Petershill Park
19:00	Stanway 50', 53'; Chalmers 51'	Report	Trialist 8', 10'

5 July 2025 Friendly	Partick Thistle	4–1	Hamilton Academical	Petershill Park
14:00	22'; Chalmers 73'; Crawford 79'; Fitzpatrick	Report	45'

=== Scottish Championship ===
2 August 2025 1	St Johnstone	5–1	Partick Thistle	McDiarmid Park
15:00	Gullan 17'; McPake 28', 37', 48'; Mallan 82'	Report	Reading 15'	Attendance: 4,991; Referee: Ross Hardie

9 August 2025 2	Partick Thistle	1–1	Greenock Morton	Firhill Stadium
15:00	Chalmers 50' (pen.)	Report	Crawford 33'	Attendance: 3,926; Referee: Calum Scott

23 August 2025 3	Ross County	1–3	Partick Thistle	Victoria Park
15:00	Randall 66'	Report	Stanway 28'; Chalmers 48'; Lawless 90+2' (pen.)	Attendance: 3,098; Referee: Iain Snedden

30 August 2025 4	Partick Thistle	3–2	Raith Rovers	Firhill Stadium
15:00	Watt 7'; Fitzpatrick 13'; Chalmers 75'	Report	Easton 22' (pen.); Matthews 36'	Attendance: 3,871; Referee: Peter Stuart

12 September 2025 5	Partick Thistle	2–1	Airdrieonians	Firhill Stadium
19:45	O'Reilly 77'; Samuel 82'	Report	McKinnon 3'	Attendance: 3,234; Referee: Grant Irvine

27 September 2025 6	Dunfermline Athletic	0–2	Partick Thistle	East End Park
15:00	Cáceres (red card) 44'	Report	Watt 1'; Chalmers 10'	Attendance: 5,629; Referee: Duncan Nicolson

30 September 2025 7	Queen's Park	0–1	Partick Thistle	Lesser Hampden
19:45		Report	Watt 7'	Attendance: 903; Referee: Sean Murdoch

4 October 2025 8	Partick Thistle	1–1	Arbroath	Firhill Stadium
19:45	Chalmers 5'	Report	Marshall 62'	Attendance: 3,128; Referee: Chris Graham

11 October 2025 9	Greenock Morton	1–1	Partick Thistle	Cappielow
15:00	Adeloye 23'	Report	Samuel 90+3'	Attendance: 2,883; Referee: Kevin Clancy

18 October 2025 10	Partick Thistle	1–0	Ross County	Firhill Stadium
15:00	Smyth 58'	Report		Attendance: 3,182; Referee: Peter Stuart

21 October 2025 11	Partick Thistle	2–1	Ayr United	Firhill Stadium
19:45	Lets'osa 46'; Stanway 50'	Report	Walker 45+2' (red card) 72'	Attendance: 3,123; Referee: David Dickinson

25 October 2025 12	Raith Rovers	2–0	Partick Thistle	Stark's Park
15:00	Easton 55'; Hanlon 67'	Report		Attendance: 3,776; Referee: Grant Irvine

1 November 2025 13	Partick Thistle	5–0	Queen's Park	Firhill Stadium
15:00	Reading 16'; Stanway 45+11'; Chalmers 74'; Lets'osa 78'; McBeth 90+2'	Report		Attendance: 3,370; Referee: Chris Graham

7 November 2025 14	Airdrieonians	1–1	Partick Thistle	Excelsior Stadium
19:45	Henderson 70'	Report	Smyth 90+4'	Attendance: 2,068; Referee: Duncan Nicolson

22 November 2025 15	Partick Thistle	2–1	St Johnstone	Firhill Stadium
15:00	O'Reilly 6'; Watt 45+2'	Report	McPake 71'	Attendance: 5,461; Referee: Don Robertson

25 November 2025 16	Partick Thistle	1–0	Dunfermline Athletic	Firhill Stadium
19:45	Fitzpatrick 25'	Report		Attendance: 2,893; Referee: Calum Scott

6 December 2025 17	Ayr United	0–0	Partick Thistle	Somerset Park
15:00		Report		Attendance: 2,815; Referee: Euan Anderson

13 December 2025 18	Arbroath	2–1	Partick Thistle	Gayfield Park
15:00	Marshall 50'; Reilly 63'; Watson (red card) 74'	Report	Samuel 77'	Attendance: 1,844; Referee: Ryan Lee

20 December 2025 19	Partick Thistle	0–0	Raith Rovers	Firhill Stadium
15:00		Report	Mullin (red card) 66'	Attendance: 3,682; Referee: Ross Hardie

27 December 2025 20	Queen's Park	2–2	Partick Thistle	Lesser Hampden
15:00	Drozd 29'; Murray 82'		Stanway 12'; Murray 16' (o.g.); Smyth (red card) 41'	Attendance: 939; Referee: Lloyd Wilson

3 January 2026 21	Partick Thistle	3–2	Greenock Morton	Firhill Stadium
15:00	Stanway 50'; Turner 77'; Watt 90+4'	Report	Garrity 22'; Brophy 44'	Attendance: 3,741; Referee: Sean Murdoch

9 January 2026 22	Ross County	2–0	Partick Thistle	Victoria Park
19:45	Henderson 1', 10'	Report		Attendance: 2,720; Referee: Colin Steven

24 January 2026 23	Partick Thistle	2–1	Ayr United	Firhill Stadium
15:00	Chalmers 12'; Samuel 14'	Report	Main 44'	Attendance: 3,977; Referee: Grant Irvine

30 January 2026 24	St Johnstone	2–2	Partick Thistle	McDiarmid Park
19:45	Agyeman 48'; McPake 66'	Report	Smyth 42', 90+6' (pen.)	Attendance: 5,949; Referee: Sean Murdoch

21 February 2026 25	Partick Thistle	1–0	Airdrieonians	Firhill Stadium
15:00	Stanway 23'	Report		Attendance: 3,984; Referee: Euan Anderson

24 February 2026 26	Dunfermline Athletic	2–2	Partick Thistle	East End Park
19:45	Abdulai 50'; Ngwenya 90+2'	Report	Chalmers 15'; Samuel 66'	Attendance: 5,246; Referee: Dan McFarlane

28 February 2026 27	Partick Thistle	0–0	Arbroath	Firhill Stadium
15:00	O'Reilly (red card) 59'	Report	O'Brien (red card) 86'	Attendance: 3,693; Referee: Sean Murdoch

13 March 2026 28	Greenock Morton	1–2	Partick Thistle	Cappielow
19:45	MacPherson 22'; Lopata-White (red card) 37'	Report	Stanway 38' (pen.); Samuel 90'	Attendance: 1,976; Referee: Ross Hardie

20 March 2026 29	Partick Thistle	0–0	St Johnstone	Firhill Stadium
19:45		Report		Attendance: 6,137; Referee: Duncan Nicolson

24 March 2026 30	Raith Rovers	0–2	Partick Thistle	Stark's Park
19:45		Report	McPherson 40'; Fitzpatrick 90+4'	Attendance: 3,422; Referee: Dan McFarlane

27 March 2026 31	Partick Thistle	3–1	Ross County	Firhill Stadium
19:45	Samuel 19'; Crawford 25'; McPherson 45'	Report	Lindsay 2'	Attendance: 3,370; Referee: Chris Graham

4 April 2026 32	Ayr United	1–1	Partick Thistle	Somerset Park
15:00	Murphy 77' (pen.)	Report	Ashcroft (red card) 58'; Loughrey 69'	Attendance: 3,253; Referee: Ross Hardie

11 April 2026 33	Partick Thistle	2–0	Dunfermline Athletic	Firhill Stadium
15:00	Samuel 18', 22'	Report		Attendance: 4,017; Referee: Kevin Clancy

18 April 2026 34	Airdrieonians	2–2	Partick Thistle	Excelsior Stadium
15:00	Mochrie 36'; McGrattan 90'	Report	Mochrie 50' (o.g.); Fitzpatrick 57'	Attendance: 2,275; Referee: Calum Scott

25 April 2026 35	Arbroath	0–0	Partick Thistle	Gayfield Park
15:00		Report		Attendance: 2,015; Referee: Grant Irvine

1 May 2026 36	Partick Thistle	1–1	Queen's Park	Firhill Stadium
19:45	Watt 25'	Report	Ruth 64' (pen.)	Attendance: 3,478; Referee: Jamie Wilkie

=== Premiership play-offs ===
12 May 2026 Semi-finals 1st leg	Dunfermline Athletic	1–1	Partick Thistle	East End Park
19:45	Morrison 23'	Report	Stanway 24'	Attendance: 6,873; Referee: Duncan Nicolson

15 May 2026 Semi-finals 2nd leg	Partick Thistle	2–1 (3–2 agg.)	Dunfermline Athletic	Firhill Stadium
19:45	Chalmers 50'; Samuel 75'	Report	Gilmour 34'	Attendance: 8,044; Referee: Calum Scott

21 May 2026 Final 1st leg	Partick Thistle	1–1	St Mirren	Firhill Stadium
20:00	Fitzpatrick 62'	Report	Phillips 39'	Attendance: 8,323; Referee: Ryan Lee

25 May 2026 Final 2nd leg	St Mirren	1–0 (2–1 agg.)	Partick Thistle	St Mirren Park
20:00	Fraser 65'	Report		Attendance: 7,472; Referee: Nick Walsh

=== Scottish League Cup ===
==== Group stage ====
11 July 2025 Group stage	Edinburgh City	1–4	Partick Thistle	Meadowbank Stadium
19:45	Daramola 45+5'	Report	Logan 6'; Crawford 9'; Mahon 23' (o.g.); Chalmers 40'	Attendance: 564; Referee: Iain Snedden

15 July 2025 Group stage	Partick Thistle	2–0	Stranraer	Firhill Stadium
19:45	Ashcroft 46'; Watt 87'	Report		Attendance: 1,952; Referee: Duncan Nicolson

22 July 2025 Group stage	Partick Thistle	2–0	Queen of the South	Firhill Stadium
19:45	Fitzpatrick 32'; Lets'osa 34'	Report		Attendance: 2,235; Referee: George Calder

26 July 2025 Group stage	Ross County	1–3	Partick Thistle	Victoria Park
15:00	White 88'	Report	Crawford 44'; Chalmers 64'; Stanway 84'	Attendance: 1,740; Referee: Ryan Lee

==== Knockout phase ====
16 August 2025 Second round	Partick Thistle	2–0	Ayr United	Firhill Stadium
15:00	O'Reilly 41'; Chalmers 45+4'	Report		Attendance: 3,124; Referee: Ryan Lee

20 September 2025 Quarter-finals	Partick Thistle	0–4	Celtic	Firhill Stadium
15:30		Report	Yang 26'; Scales 28'; Tounekti 46'; McCowan 79'	Attendance: 8,817; Referee: Kevin Clancy

=== Scottish Challenge Cup ===
16 December 2025 Second round	Cove Rangers	1–2	Partick Thistle	Balmoral Stadium
19:45	Emslie 3'	Report	Turner 24'; Samuel 27'	Attendance: 389; Referee: Gavin Duncan
Note: Match postponed due to Storm Bram.

13 January 2026 Third round	Partick Thistle	3–3 (2–4 p)	Inverness CT	Firhill Stadium
19:45	Chalmers 11'; Loughrey 61'; Samuel 62'	Report	MacIntyre 23'; McKay 39', 84'	Attendance: 1,370; Referee: Euan Anderson

=== Scottish Cup ===
29 November 2025 Third round	Forfar Athletic	0–2	Partick Thistle	Station Park
15:00		Report	Stanway 20'; Samuel 90+3'	Attendance: 1,394; Referee: Iain Snedden

17 January 2026 Fourth round	Partick Thistle	3–1	Montrose	Firhill Stadium
15:00	Watt 10', 48'; Chalmers (red card) 73'; Diack 90+1'	Report	North 85'; Masson (red card) 86'	Attendance: 2,564; Referee: Lloyd Wilson

7 February 2026 Fifth round	Elgin City	2–3	Partick Thistle	Borough Briggs
19:45	Sargent 39', 74'	Report	Crawford 17'; Watt 44' (pen.); Stanway 80'	Attendance: 2,754; Referee: Colin Steven

8 March 2026 Quarter-finals	St Mirren	2–1	Partick Thistle	St Mirren Park
19:30	Nlundulu 33' (pen.); Young 45+2'	Report	Stanway 61'	Attendance: 5,548; Referee: David Dickinson

=== Glasgow Cup ===
14 October 2025 Group Stage	Queen's Park	1–1 (5–6 p)	Partick Thistle	Pollok
17:00	Sowa 49'	Report	Falconer 61'	Stadium: Lochinch Park

19 January 2026 Group Stage	Rangers B	5–0	Partick Thistle	Milngavie
19:30	Cameron; Eadie; Lawson	Report		Stadium: Rangers Training Centre

10 February 2026 Group Stage	Celtic B	6–0	Partick Thistle	Lennoxtown
19:30				Stadium: Lennoxtown Training Centre

14 April 2026 Semi-finals	Celtic B	4–1	Partick Thistle	Lennoxtown
19:30				Stadium: Lennoxtown Training Centre

== Squad statistics ==
=== Player statistics ===
As of 25 May 2026 (UTC)

No.	Pos	Nat	Player	Total		Championship + playoffs		League Cup		Challenge Cup		Scottish Cup		Glasgow Cup	
No.	Pos	Nat	Player	Apps	Goals	Apps	Goals	Apps	Goals	Apps	Goals	Apps	Goals	Apps	Goals
1	GK	(Scotland) SCO	Lewis Budinauckas	11	0	3+0	0	5+0	0	2+0	0	0+0	0	1+0	0
2	DF	(Scotland) SCO	Cammy Logan	28	1	5+13	0	5+1	1	2+0	0	1+1	0	0+0	0
3	DF	(Scotland) SCO	Patrick Reading	49	2	36+1	2	6+0	0	2+0	0	3+1	0	0+0	0
5	DF	(Scotland) SCO	Lee Ashcroft	42	1	32+0	0	6+0	1	0+0	0	4+0	0	0+0	0
6	MF	(Scotland) SCO	Kyle Turner	33	2	5+21	1	0+1	0	2+0	1	2+2	0	0+0	0
7	MF	(Scotland) SCO	Daniel MacKay	1	0	0+0	0	0+0	0	0+0	0	0+0	0	1+0	0
8	MF	(Northern Ireland) NIR	Oisin Smyth	28	3	24+2	3	0+1	0	0+1	0	0+0	0	0+0	0
9	FW	(Wales) WAL	Alex Samuel	43	13	21+13	10	0+2	0	2+0	2	4+0	1	1+0	0
10	MF	(Scotland) SCO	Logan Chalmers	42	13	27+6	9	6+0	3	2+0	1	1+0	0	0+0	0
11	MF	(Scotland) SCO	Gary Mackay-Steven	7	0	1+6	0	0+0	0	0+0	0	0+0	0	0+0	0
12	GK	(Northern Ireland) NIR	Josh Clarke	42	0	37+0	0	1+0	0	0+0	0	4+0	0	0+0	0
14	MF	(Scotland) SCO	Robbie Crawford	35	4	19+7	1	6+0	2	0+0	0	2+0	1	1+0	0
17	DF	(England) ENG	Ethan Ingram	10	0	7+3	0	0+0	0	0+0	0	0+0	0	0+0	0
18	FW	(Scotland) SCO	Ricco Diack	12	1	0+8	0	0+0	0	0+1	0	0+2	1	1+0	0
19	MF	(Scotland) SCO	Luke McBeth	39	1	17+11	1	4+1	0	2+0	0	1+2	0	1+0	0
20	DF	(Republic of Ireland) IRL	Daniel O'Reilly	42	3	32+0	2	6+0	1	1+0	0	3+0	0	0+0	0
21	MF	(Scotland) SCO	Aidan Fitzpatrick	47	6	33+2	5	6+0	1	1+1	0	4+0	0	0+0	0
22	DF	(Canada) CAN	Cale Loughrey	14	2	7+6	1	0+0	0	0+1	1	0+0	0	0+0	0
23	MF	(Scotland) SCO	Sean McArdle	5	0	0+4	0	0+0	0	0+0	0	0+1	0	0+0	0
24	DF	(Scotland) SCO	Ben McPherson	39	2	33+1	2	1+0	0	0+0	0	4+0	0	0+0	0
26	MF	(Scotland) SCO	Ben Stanway	43	12	28+4	8	4+2	1	1+0	0	4+0	3	0+0	0
30	MF	(Scotland) SCO	Fraser Taylor	8	0	3+5	0	0+0	0	0+0	0	0+0	0	0+0	0
32	FW	(Scotland) SCO	Tony Watt	44	10	29+4	6	4+2	1	0+2	0	3+0	3	0+0	0
39	MF	(Scotland) SCO	Matthew Falconer	8	1	0+1	0	0+4	0	0+1	0	0+0	0	2+0	1
40	MF	(Scotland) SCO	Nick Lockhart	6	0	0+0	0	0+4	0	0+0	0	0+0	0	1+1	0
42	DF	(Scotland) SCO	Liam Dolan	2	0	0+0	0	0+0	0	1+0	0	0+0	0	1+0	0
44	FW	(Scotland) SCO	Daniel Gray	2	0	0+1	0	0+0	0	0+0	0	0+0	0	0+1	0
64	MF	(Scotland) SCO	Ts'oanelo Lets'osa	46	3	27+9	2	4+0	1	0+2	0	2+2	0	0+0	0
Players who left the club during the 2025–26 season
4	MF	(Scotland) SCO	Scott Martin	9	0	0+3	0	0+0	0	2+0	0	1+2	0	1+0	0
11	MF	(Scotland) SCO	Steven Lawless	23	1	0+14	1	2+4	0	1+0	0	1+0	0	1+0	0
17	MF	(Scotland) SCO	Zander MacKenzie	4	0	0+1	0	0+3	0	0+0	0	0+0	0	0+0	0
36	MF	(Scotland) SCO	Ché Campbell	1	0	0+0	0	0+1	0	0+0	0	0+0	0	0+0	0
37	FW	(Scotland) SCO	Thomas Horn	7	0	0+1	0	0+4	0	0+0	0	0+0	0	1+1	0
38	GK	(Scotland) SCO	Luis Cameron	0	0	0+0	0	0+0	0	0+0	0	0+0	0	0+0	0
41	DF	(Scotland) SCO	Liam Rooney	1	0	0+0	0	0+0	0	0+0	0	0+0	0	1+0	0
43	DF	(Scotland) SCO	Jamie Low	0	0	0+0	0	0+0	0	0+0	0	0+0	0	0+0	0

== Club statistics ==
=== League table ===
Pos	Team	Pld	W	D	L	GF	GA	GD	Pts	Promotion, qualification or relegation
1	St Johnstone (C, P)	36	22	11	3	67	25	+42	77	Promotion to the Premiership
2	Partick Thistle	36	17	15	4	53	36	+17	66	Qualification for the Premiership play-off semi-final
3	Arbroath	36	13	13	10	43	41	+2	52	Qualification for the Premiership play-off quarter-final
4	Dunfermline Athletic	36	14	9	13	52	41	+11	51	Qualification for the Premiership play-off quarter-final
5	Raith Rovers	36	12	9	15	43	42	+1	45	

Rules for classification: 1) Points; 2) Goal difference; 3) Goals scored; 4) Head-to head points; 5) Head-to-head goal difference; 6) Play-off (only for deciding promotion, play-off participation and relegation).
(C) Champions; (P) Promoted

=== League Cup table ===
Pos	Team	Pld	W	PW	PL	L	GF	GA	GD	Pts	Qualification	PAR	ROS	STR	QOS	EDI
1	Partick Thistle	4	4	0	0	0	11	2	+9	12	Qualification for the second round	—	—	2–0	2–0	—
2	Ross County	4	2	0	1	1	11	4	+7	7		1–3	—	—	—	8–0
3	Stranraer	4	1	1	1	1	2	3	−1	6		—	p1–1	—	1–0	—
4	Queen of the South	4	1	0	0	3	4	4	0	3		—	0–1	—	—	4–0
5	Edinburgh City	4	0	1	0	3	1	16	−15	2		1–4	—	p0–0	—	—

Rules for classification: 1) goal difference, 2) goals scored, 3) away goals scored, 4) matches won, 5) away matches won, 6) drawing of lots.

== Transfers ==
=== In ===
Date	Position	Nationality	Name	From	Fee
17 June 2025	DF	(Scotland)	Patrick Reading	Ayr United	Free
19 June 2025	GK	(Scotland)	Lewis Budinauckas	Rangers	Free
4 July 2025	DF	(Scotland)	Cammy Logan	Forfar Athletic	Free
9 July 2025	FW	(Scotland)	Tony Watt	Dundee United	Free
15 July 2025	MF	(Scotland)	Ts'oanelo Lets'osa	Lommel	Free
12 August 2025	FW	(Wales)	Alex Samuel	Ross County	Free
13 January 2026	DF	(Canada)	Cale Loughrey	Hamilton Academical	Free
26 March 2026	MF	(Scotland)	Gary Mackay-Steven	Ross County	Free

=== Out ===
Date	Position	Nationality	Name	To	Fee
4 June 2025	FW	(Scotland)	Alex Jakubiak	Al Ittihad	Free
4 June 2025	DF	(Scotland)	Sean Kelly	Boeung Ket	Free
4 June 2025	GK	(Scotland)	David Mitchell	Ayr United	Free
4 June 2025	DF	(Scotland)	Aaron Muirhead	Arbroath	Free
4 June 2025	MF	(Scotland)	Jamie Taggart	Benburb	Free
4 June 2025	FW	(Scotland)	Sallu Turay	Stranraer	Free
4 June 2025	MF	(Scotland)	Stuart Bannigan	Ayr United	Free
13 June 2025	FW	(Scotland)	Brian Graham	Falkirk	Undisclosed
2 February 2026	MF	(Scotland)	Steven Lawless	The Spartans	Free

=== Loans in ===
Date	Position	Nationality	Name	From	Fee
25 July 2025	GK	(Northern Ireland)	Josh Clarke	Celtic	Loan
4 August 2025	DF	(Scotland)	Ben McPherson	Celtic	Loan
1 September 2025	MF	(Northern Ireland)	Oisin Smyth	St Mirren	Loan
1 October 2025	MF	(Scotland)	Sean McArdle	Celtic	Loan
29 January 2026	MF	(Scotland)	Fraser Taylor	St Mirren	Loan
27 February 2026	DF	(England)	Ethan Ingram	Dundee	Loan

=== Loans out ===
Date	Position	Nationality	Name	To	Fee
30 July 2025	GK	(Scotland)	Luis Cameron	Drumchapel United	Loan
5 September 2025	GK	(Scotland)	Ricco Diack	Kelty Hearts	Loan
25 September 2025	MF	(Scotland)	Zander MacKenzie	Queen of the South	Loan
26 September 2025	MF	(Scotland)	Matthew Falconer	Linlithgow Rose	Co-operation loan
26 September 2025	MF	(Scotland)	Nick Lockhart	Linlithgow Rose	Co-operation loan
31 October 2025	MF	(Scotland)	Jamie Low	Glenafton Athletic	Loan
16 January 2026	DF	(Scotland)	Jamie Low	Pollok	Loan
16 January 2026	DF	(Scotland)	Alex Mann	Pollok	Loan
30 January 2026	MF	(Scotland)	Ché Campbell	East Stirlingshire	Loan
19 February 2026	MF	(Scotland)	Scott Martin	Queen's Park	Loan

== See also ==
- List of Partick Thistle F.C. seasons
