= 2024–25 Partick Thistle F.C. season =

Partick Thistle
2024–25 season
- Chairman: Richard Beastall
- Manager: Kris Doolan (until 18 February); Brian Graham (interim)
- Stadium: Firhill Stadium
- Scottish Championship: 4th
- Premiership play-offs: Semi-finals
- Scottish Cup: Third round
- League Cup: Group stage
- Challenge Cup: Third round
- Glasgow Cup: Semi-finals
- Top goalscorer: League: Brian Graham (15); All: Brian Graham (21)
- Highest home attendance: 5,470 vs. Livingston, Play-offs, 13 May 2025
- Lowest home attendance: 1,923 vs. Montrose, League Cup, 13 July 2024
- Average home league attendance: 3,942
Home colours	Away colours	Third colours

The 2024–25 season was Partick Thistle's fourth season back in the Scottish Championship, having been promoted from League One at the end of the 2020–21 season. Thistle also competed in the League Cup, Challenge Cup, Scottish Cup and Glasgow Cup.

== Results and fixtures ==
Win Draw Loss Postponed

=== Pre-season ===
6 July 2024	Glenafton Athletic	2–4	Partick Thistle	Loch Park
15:00	Kerr 63', 87'	Report	Graham 8', 11', 44'; Fitzpatrick 32'

=== Scottish Championship ===
3 August 2024 1	Partick Thistle	0–0	Greenock Morton	Firhill Stadium
15:00		Report		Attendance: 4,148; Referee: Colin Steven

10 August 2024 2	Raith Rovers	1–0	Partick Thistle	Stark's Park
15:00	Easton 27 pen.'	Report	Robinson (red card) 76'	Attendance: 4,002; Referee: Peter Stuart

24 August 2024 3	Falkirk	2–1	Partick Thistle	Falkirk Stadium
15:00	Henderson 58'; Spencer 83'	Report	Stanway (red card) 25'; Ablade 76'	Attendance: 6,502; Referee: Lloyd Wilson

31 August 2024 4	Partick Thistle	3–0	Queen's Park	Firhill Stadium
15:00	Milne 11'; Fitzpatrick 72'; MacKenzie 89'	Report		Attendance: 4,034; Referee: Steven Kirkland

14 September 2024 5	Ayr United	1–1	Partick Thistle	Somerset Park
15:00	Dowds 25 pen.'	Report	Milne 74'	Attendance: 3,118; Referee: Ross Hardie

14 September 2024 6	Partick Thistle	1–0	Dunfermline Athletic	Firhill Stadium
15:00	Fitzpatrick 88'	Report		Attendance: 4,301; Referee: Euan Anderson

28 September 2024 7	Hamilton Academical	1–0	Partick Thistle	New Douglas Park
15:00	Kilday 56'	Report		Attendance: 1,677; Referee: David Dickinson

5 October 2024 8	Partick Thistle	0–0	Livingston	Firhill Stadium
15:00		Report		Attendance: 3,668; Referee: Ryan Lee

12 October 2024 9	Partick Thistle	1–1	Falkirk	Firhill Stadium
15:00	Graham 61'	Report	Ross 59'	Attendance: 4,762; Referee: Steven McLean

19 October 2024 10	Partick Thistle	2–1	Airdrieonians	Firhill Stadium
15:00	Graham 5', 72'	Report	Frizzell 39'; McGrattan (red card) 51'	Attendance: 3,609; Referee: Iain Snedden

26 October 2024 11	Queen's Park	0–1	Partick Thistle	Hampden Park
15:00		Report	Chalmers 14'	Attendance: 2,779; Referee: Craig Napier

2 November 2024 12	Dunfermline Athletic	0–1	Partick Thistle	East End Park
15:00		Report	Robinson 57'	Attendance: 5,162; Referee: Matthew MacDermid

9 November 2024 13	Partick Thistle	1–1	Raith Rovers	Firhill Stadium
15:00	Graham 6'	Report	Easton 68'	Attendance: 4,348; Referee: Ryan Lee

16 November 2024 14	Partick Thistle	5–1	Hamilton Academical	Firhill Stadium
15:00	Robinson 5', 20'; Graham 49', 66'; Chalmers 64'	Report	O'Hara 45'	Attendance: 3,845; Referee: Ross Hardie

7 December 2024 15	Partick Thistle	1–0	Ayr United	Firhill Stadium
15:00	Turner 82 pen.'	Report		Attendance: 3,521; Referee: Calum Scott

13 December 2024 16	Livingston	2–0	Partick Thistle	Almondvale Stadium
19:45	Yengi 7'; Muirhead 69'	Report		Attendance: 1,544; Referee: Graham Grainger

21 December 2024 17	Airdrieonians	0–2	Partick Thistle	Excelsior Stadium
15:00		Report	Graham 37'; O'Reilly 43'	Referee: Peter Stuart

28 December 2024 18	Partick Thistle	2–1	Queen's Park	Firhill Stadium
15:00	Graham 7', 47'	Report	Thomas 26'	Attendance: 4,350; Referee: Lloyd Wilson

31 December 2024 19	Greenock Morton	2–1	Partick Thistle	Cappielow
15:00	Stuparević 54'; Blues 90+1'	Report	Fitzpatrick 61'	Attendance: 2,340; Referee: Ryan Lee

4 January 2025 20	Partick Thistle	1–4	Dunfermline Athletic	Firhill Stadium
15:00	Chalmers 6'	Report	McCann 4'; Megwa 35 o.g.' Kane 45+2'; Cooper 82'	Attendance: 3,938; Referee: Steven Kirkland

10 January 2025 21	Hamilton Academical	1–2	Partick Thistle	New Douglas Park
15:00	Tumilty 61'	Report	Graham 75'; Stanway 82'	Attendance: 1,122; Referee: Iain Snedden

25 January 2025 22	Ayr United	2–1	Partick Thistle	Somerset Park
15:00	Oakley 19', 36'; McAllister (red card) 76'	Report	Milne 87'	Attendance: 3,175; Referee: Peter Stuart

1 February 2025 23	Partick Thistle	2–2	Greenock Morton	Firhill Stadium
15:00	O'Reilly 61'; Chalmers 90+1'	Report	Shaw 45'; Stuparević 69'	Attendance: 3,966; Referee: Chris Graham

8 February 2025 24	Falkirk	5–2	Partick Thistle	Falkirk Stadium
15:00	Arfield 1', 40 pen.', 60 pen.' Oliver 35'; McCann 76'	Report	Chalmers 10'; Graham 24' (red card)	Attendance: 6,471; Referee: Ross Hardie

15 February 2025 25	Raith Rovers	3–0	Partick Thistle	Stark's Park
15:00	Pollock 8', 26'; Easton 62 pen.'	Report		Attendance: 3,749; Referee: Lloyd Wilson

22 February 2025 26	Partick Thistle	1–1	Airdrieonians	Firhill Stadium
15:00	Graham 17'	Report	Wilson 54'	Attendance: 3,599; Referee: David Dickinson

28 February 2025 27	Partick Thistle	1–1	Livingston	Firhill Stadium
19:45	Graham 25'	Report	Muirhead 78'	Attendance: 2,946; Referee: Ryan Lee

11 March 2025 28	Queen's Park	0–2	Partick Thistle	Hampden Park
19:45		Report	Chalmers 5'; Jakubiak 90+2'	Attendance: 1,758; Referee: Ross Hardie

15 March 2025 29	Partick Thistle	2–0	Ayr United	Firhill Stadium
15:00	Chalmers 19'; McBeth 27'	Report		Attendance: 4,289; Referee: Lloyd Wilson

21 March 2025 30	Partick Thistle	0–0	Raith Rovers	Firhill Stadium
19:45		Report		Attendance: 3,213; Referee: Calum Scott

29 March 2025 31	Greenock Morton	0–1	Partick Thistle	Cappielow
15:00		Report	O'Reilly 74'	Attendance: 2,570; Referee: Chris Graham

5 April 2025 32	Airdrieonians	2–1	Partick Thistle	Excelsior Stadium
15:00	Mochrie 48', 90'	Report	Stanway 83'	Attendance: 2,249; Referee: Greg Soutar

12 April 2025 33	Partick Thistle	1–2	Hamilton Academical	Firhill Stadium
15:00	Graham 90+5'	Report	Todorov 15'; Robinson 17'	Attendance: 3,421; Referee: Duncan Nicolson

19 April 2025 34	Dunfermline Athletic	0–0	Partick Thistle	East End Park
15:00		Report		Attendance: 5,688; Referee: Nick Walsh

25 April 2025 35	Partick Thistle	2–1	Falkirk	Firhill Stadium
19:45	Graham 6'; Bannigan (yellow card) 35' (yellow-red card); Ablade 90+8'	Report	Arfield 39'; Agyeman (red card) 83'	Attendance: 4,997; Referee: Matthew MacDermid

2 May 2025 36	Livingston	0–1	Partick Thistle	Almondvale Stadium
19:45		Report	Tait 39 o.g.'	Attendance: 4,500; Referee: Calum Scott

=== Premiership play-offs ===
6 May 2025 Quarter-finals 1st leg	Partick Thistle	0–1	Ayr United	Firhill Stadium
19:45		Report	Murphy 55'	Attendance: 5,250; Referee: David Dickinson

9 May 2025 Quarter-finals 2nd leg	Ayr United	0–2 (1–2 agg.)	Partick Thistle	Somerset Park
19:45		Report	Graham 6', 88'	Attendance: 5,308; Referee: Nick Walsh

13 May 2025 Semi-finals 1st leg	Partick Thistle	0–2	Livingston	Firhill Stadium
19:45		Report	Pittman 39'; Wilson 52'	Attendance: 5,470; Referee: Don Robertson

16 May 2025 Semi-finals 2nd leg	Livingston	2–0 (4–0 agg.)	Partick Thistle	Almondvale Stadium
19:45	Brandon 40'; May 67'	Report		Referee: Kevin Clancy

=== Scottish League Cup ===
==== Group stage ====
13 July 2024 Group stage	Partick Thistle	3–2	Montrose	Firhill Stadium
15:00	Muirhead 43'; Turner 47'; Graham 75'	Report	Maciver-Redwood 37'; Hermiston 64'	Attendance: 1,923; Referee: Matthew McDermid

20 July 2024 Group stage	Edinburgh City	0–6	Partick Thistle	Meadowbank Stadium
15:00		Report	Robinson 57'; Graham 69'; Milne 75'; Diack 78'; Williams 85'; Turner 90+1'	Referee: Ross Hardie

23 July 2024 Group stage	Partick Thistle	2–3	Clyde	Firhill Stadium
19:45	Fitzpatrick 5'; Graham 61'	Report	Ashcroft 27 o.g.' Dunachie 44', 86'	Attendance: 2,848; Referee: John Beaton

27 July 2024 Group stage	Motherwell	0–0 (1–3 p)	Partick Thistle	Fir Park
15:00		Report		Attendance: 5,695; Referee: David Dickinson

=== Scottish Challenge Cup ===
7 September 2024 Third round	Partick Thistle	1–3	Alloa Athletic	Fir Park
15:00	Graham 14'	Report	Cawley 65', 76'; Taggart 90+5 pen.'	Attendance: 1,969; Referee: Duncan Williams

=== Scottish Cup ===
30 November 2024 Third round	Queen's Park	2–2 (7–6 p)	Partick Thistle	Hampden Park
15:00	Longridge 34'; MacGregor 42'	Report	Crawford 12'; Tizzard 64 o.g.'	Attendance: 1,769; Referee: Euan Anderson

=== Glasgow Cup ===
2 September 2024 Group stage	Queen's Park	2–2 (5–4 p)	Partick Thistle	Lochinch Park
14:00	McLeish 46'; McVey (red card); McGarva	Report	Diack 55'; Falconer 90'

5 November 2024 Group stage	Rangers B	5–0	Partick Thistle	Rangers Training Centre
19:45	Curtis; Hagi; Eadie	Report

4 February 2025 Group stage	Celtic B	5–0	Partick Thistle	Lennoxtown
19:45		Report

2 April 2025 Group stage	Partick Thistle	4–4 (5–3 p)	Clyde	Petershill Park
19:45	Falconer 26'; Campbell 72', 80'; Horn 77'	Report	Leitch 14'; Connell 17'; Scullion 47'; Williamson 90'

15 April 2025 Semi-finals	Rangers B	2–1	Partick Thistle	Rangers Training Centre
19:45	Burnside 12'; Eadie 20'	Report	Taggart 50'

== Squad statistics ==
=== Player statistics ===
As of 16 May 2025 (UTC)

No.	Pos	Nat	Player	Total		Championship + Play-offs		League Cup		Challenge Cup		Scottish Cup		Glasgow Cup	
No.	Pos	Nat	Player	Apps	Goals	Apps	Goals	Apps	Goals	Apps	Goals	Apps	Goals	Apps	Goals
1	GK	(Scotland) SCO	David Mitchell	17	0	13+0	0	3+0	0	0+0	0	0+0	0	1+0	0
2	DF	(Scotland) SCO	Sean Kelly	6	0	3+2	0	0+0	0	0+0	0	0+0	0	1+0	0
3	DF	(Scotland) SCO	Josh Reid	8	0	7+1	0	0+0	0	0+0	0	0+0	0	0+0	0
4	MF	(Scotland) SCO	Scott Martin	5	0	4+1	0	0+0	0	0+0	0	0+0	0	0+0	0
6	MF	(Scotland) SCO	Kyle Turner	44	3	32+6	1	4+0	2	1+0	0	1+0	0	0+0	0
7	MF	(Scotland) SCO	Daniel MacKay	2	0	0+0	0	1+1	0	0+0	0	0+0	0	0+0	0
8	MF	(Scotland) SCO	Stuart Bannigan	37	0	29+4	0	1+1	0	1+0	0	1+0	0	0+0	0
9	FW	(Scotland) SCO	Brian Graham	43	21	37+0	17	4+0	3	1+0	1	1+0	0	0+0	0
10	MF	(Scotland) SCO	Logan Chalmers	41	7	30+5	7	3+1	0	1+0	0	1+0	0	0+0	0
11	MF	(Scotland) SCO	Steven Lawless	19	0	3+13	0	0+0	0	0+0	0	0+1	0	2+0	0
12	GK	(Scotland) SCO	Lewis Budinauckas	8	0	8+0	0	0+0	0	0+0	0	0+0	0	0+0	0
14	MF	(Scotland) SCO	Robbie Crawford	42	1	32+6	0	2+1	0	0+0	0	1+0	1	0+0	0
15	FW	(Scotland) SCO	Alex Jakubiak	9	1	1+7	1	0+0	0	0+0	0	0+0	0	1+0	0
18	FW	(Finland) FIN	Terry Ablade	30	2	4+21	2	0+0	0	0+1	0	0+1	0	3+0	0
19	MF	(Scotland) SCO	Luke McBeth	46	1	28+11	1	4+0	0	1+0	0	0+1	0	1+0	0
20	DF	(Republic of Ireland) IRL	Daniel O'Reilly	43	3	39+0	3	2+1	0	0+0	0	1+0	0	0+0	0
21	MF	(Scotland) SCO	Aidan Fitzpatrick	44	4	28+10	3	4+0	1	1+0	0	1+0	0	0+0	0
22	DF	(Scotland) SCO	Ethan Drysdale	0	0	0+0	0	0+0	0	0+0	0	0+0	0	0+0	0
23	DF	(Scotland) SCO	Lee Ashcroft	41	0	33+3	0	2+1	0	0+0	0	1+0	0	1+0	0
26	MF	(Scotland) SCO	Ben Stanway	29	2	9+14	2	1+2	0	0+1	0	0+0	0	2+0	0
29	MF	(Scotland) SCO	Zander MacKenzie	19	1	0+14	1	0+2	0	0+1	0	0+0	0	2+0	0
30	DF	(England) ENG	Kanayo Megwa	29	0	26+3	0	0+0	0	0+0	0	0+0	0	0+0	0
38	GK	(Scotland) SCO	Luis Cameron	1	0	0+0	0	0+0	0	0+0	0	0+0	0	1+0	0
39	MF	(Scotland) SCO	Matthew Falconer	5	2	0+1	0	0+0	0	0+0	0	0+0	0	3+1	2
41	DF	(Scotland) SCO	Liam Rooney	3	0	0+1	0	0+0	0	0+0	0	0+0	0	2+0	0
42	DF	(Scotland) SCO	Liam Dolan	1	0	0+1	0	0+0	0	0+0	0	0+0	0	0+0	0
43	DF	(Scotland) SCO	Jamie Low	2	0	2+0	0	0+0	0	0+0	0	0+0	0	0+0	0
Players who left the club during the 2024–25 season
2	DF	(Sweden) SWE	Casper Nilsson	4	0	3+0	0	0+0	0	1+0	0	0+0	0	0+0	0
3	DF	(Scotland) SCO	Harry Milne	22	4	17+0	3	3+0	1	1+0	0	1+0	0	0+0	0
4	DF	(England) ENG	Wasiri Williams	9	1	3+1	0	4+0	1	0+0	0	0+0	0	1+0	0
5	DF	(Scotland) SCO	Aaron Muirhead	13	1	3+6	0	3+1	1	0+0	0	0+0	0	0+0	0
12	GK	(England) ENG	Myles Roberts	23	0	18+0	0	3+0	0	1+0	0	1+0	0	0+0	0
17	FW	(Scotland) SCO	Scott Robinson	22	4	17+1	3	2+1	1	0+0	0	1+0	0	0+0	0
15	MF	(Scotland) SCO	Liam Smith	8	0	0+6	0	0+0	0	0+0	0	0+0	0	2+0	0
22	DF	(England) ENG	Charlie Sayers	10	0	5+2	0	0+0	0	1+0	0	0+0	0	2+0	0
24	GK	(United States) USA	Mason McCready	2	0	0+0	0	1+0	0	0+0	0	0+0	0	1+0	0
27	MF	(Scotland) SCO	James Lyon	3	0	1+0	0	0+0	0	1+0	0	0+0	0	1+0	0
32	FW	(Scotland) SCO	Sallu Turay	0	0	0+0	0	0+0	0	0+0	0	0+0	0	0+0	0
33	MF	(Scotland) SCO	Jamie Taggart	3	1	0+0	0	0+0	0	0+0	0	0+0	0	3+0	1
34	FW	(Scotland) SCO	Ricco Diack	14	2	2+7	0	0+1	1	0+1	0	0+1	0	2+0	1
36	MF	(Scotland) SCO	Ché Campbell	2	2	0+0	0	0+0	0	0+0	0	0+0	0	2+0	2
37	FW	(Scotland) SCO	Thomas Horn	1	1	0+0	0	0+0	0	0+0	0	0+0	0	0+1	1

== Club statistics ==
=== League table ===
Pos	Team	Pld	W	D	L	GF	GA	GD	Pts	Promotion, qualification or relegation
2	Livingston (O, P)	36	20	10	6	55	27	+28	70	Qualification for the Premiership play-off semi-final
3	Ayr United	36	18	9	9	57	39	+18	63	Qualification for the Premiership play-off quarter-final
4	Partick Thistle	36	15	10	11	43	38	+5	55	Qualification for the Premiership play-off quarter-final
5	Raith Rovers	36	15	8	13	47	43	+4	53	
6	Greenock Morton	36	12	12	12	42	48	−6	48	

Rules for classification: 1) Points; 2) Goal difference; 3) Goals scored; 4) Head-to-to head points; 5) Head-to-head goal difference; 6) Play-off (only for deciding promotion, play-off participation and relegation).
(O) Play-off winners; (P) Promoted

=== League Cup table ===
Pos	Team	Pld	W	PW	PL	L	GF	GA	GD	Pts	Qualification	MOT	PAR	MON	CLY	EDI
1	Motherwell	4	2	1	1	0	7	2	+5	9	Qualification for the second round	—	0–0p	—	—	3–0
2	Partick Thistle	4	2	1	0	1	11	5	+6	8		—	—	3–2	2–3	—
3	Montrose	4	2	0	1	1	6	5	+1	7		1–1p	—	—	—	2–1
4	Clyde	4	2	0	0	2	9	6	+3	6		1–3	—	0–1	—	—
5	Edinburgh City	4	0	0	0	4	1	16	−15	0		—	0–6	—	0–5	—

Rules for classification: 1) goal difference, 2) goals scored, 3) away goals scored, 4) matches won, 5) away matches won, 6) drawing of lots.

== Transfers ==
=== In ===
Date	Position	Nationality	Name	From	Fee
23 May 2024	MF	(Scotland)	Robbie Crawford	Greenock Morton	Free
6 June 2024	MF	(Scotland)	Kyle Turner	Ross County	Free
18 June 2024	MF	(Scotland)	Logan Chalmers	Dundee United	Free
25 June 2024	MF	(Scotland)	Daniel MacKay	Hibernian	Free
25 June 2024	DF	(Scotland)	Lee Ashcroft	Dundee	Free
2 August 2024	DF	(England)	Charlie Sayers	Tottenham Hotspur	Free
3 February 2024	MF	(Scotland)	Scott Martin	Hamilton Academical	Free
26 February 2024	FW	(Scotland)	Alex Jakubiak	Free agent	Free
27 February 2024	DF	(Scotland)	Sean Kelly	Dundee	Free

=== Out ===
Date	Position	Nationality	Name	To	Fee
21 May 2024	GK	(Scotland)	Jamie Sneddon	Falkirk	Free
21 May 2024	GK	(Scotland)	Ross Stewart	Queen of the South	Free
21 May 2024	MF	(Scotland)	Ji Stevenston	Annan Athletic	Free
10 June 2024	DF	(Scotland)	Jack McMillan	Exeter City	Free
3 July 2024	FW	(Scotland)	Ceiran Loney	Everton	Undisclosed
17 July 2024	MF	(Scotland)	Blair Alston	Stenhousemuir	Free
1 October 2024	DF	(England)	Wasiri Williams	Whitehawk	Free
19 December 2024	GK	(United States)	Mason McCready	Texoma	Free
14 January 2025	MF	(Scotland)	James Lyon	Kelty Hearts	Free
31 January 2025	DF	(England)	Charlie Sayers	Woking	Free
3 February 2025	DF	(Scotland)	Harry Milne	Heart of Midlothian	Undisclosed
3 February 2025	MF	(Scotland)	Scott Robinson	Hamilton Academical	Free

=== Loans in ===
Date	Position	Nationality	Name	From	Fee
29 July 2024	GK	(England)	Myles Roberts	Watford	Loan
12 August 2024	DF	(Sweden)	Casper Nilsson	Brighton & Hove Albion	Loan
23 August 2024	FW	(Scotland)	Liam Smith	Swansea City	Loan
23 August 2024	FW	(Finland)	Terry Ablade	Fulham	Loan
16 September 2024	DF	(England)	Kanayo Megwa	Hibernian	Loan
3 February 2025	DF	(Scotland)	Ethan Drysdale	Heart of Midlothian	Loan
13 February 2025	DF	(Scotland)	Josh Reid	Ross County	Loan
20 February 2025	GK	(Scotland)	Lewis Budinauckas	Rangers	Loan

=== Loans out ===
Date	Position	Nationality	Name	To	Fee
14 August 2024	MF	(Scotland)	Jamie Taggart	St. Cadoc’s	Loan
15 August 2024	FW	(Scotland)	Sallu Turay	Benburb	Loan
2 October 2024	MF	(Scotland)	Ché Campbell	East Kilbride	Loan
19 October 2024	GK	(Scotland)	Luis Cameron	Johnstone Burgh	Loan
30 December 2024	FW	(Scotland)	Thomas Horn	Cumbernauld United	Loan
2 October 2024	MF	(Scotland)	Ché Campbell	Broomhill	Loan
14 January 2025	FW	(Scotland)	Ricco Diack	Airdrieonians	Loan
17 January 2025	MF	(Scotland)	Jamie Taggart	Glenafton Athletic	Loan
25 February 2025	DF	(Scotland)	Aaron Muirhead	Arbroath	Loan

== See also ==
- List of Partick Thistle F.C. seasons
