= Lee Ashcroft (Scottish footballer) =

Scottish footballer (born 1993)

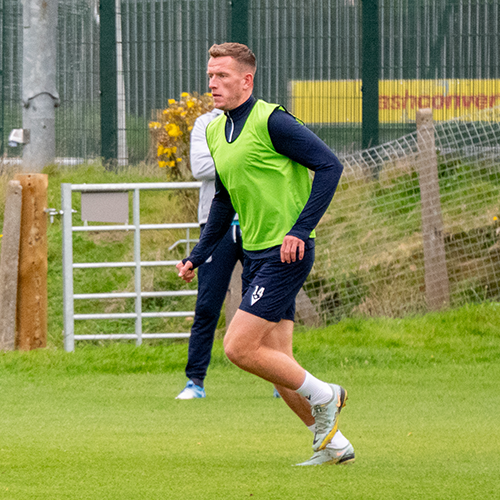
- Ashcroft training with Dundee in 2023

Personal information
- Full name: Lee Ashcroft
- Date of birth: 29 August 1993 (age 33)
- Place of birth: Barrhead, Scotland
- Position: Defender

Team information
- Current team: Partick Thistle
- Number: 5

Youth career
- Barrhead Boys Club
- 2009–2010: Hillwood Boys Club
- 2010–2013: Kilmarnock

Senior career*
| Years | Team | Apps | (Gls) |
| 2013–2016 | Kilmarnock | 66 | (4) |
| 2016–2020 | Dunfermline Athletic | 129 | (7) |
| 2020–2024 | Dundee | 83 | (9) |
| 2024 | → Raith Rovers (loan) | 1 | (0) |
| 2024– | Partick Thistle | 73 | (1) |
- * Club domestic league appearances and goals as of 18:30, 21 November 2026 (UTC)

Lee Ashcroft (born 29 August 1993) is a Scottish footballer who plays as a defender for Scottish Championship club Partick Thistle. Ashcroft previously played for Kilmarnock, Dunfermline Athletic and Dundee, as well as on loan for Raith Rovers.

== Career ==
=== Kilmarnock ===
Raised in Barrhead, Ashcroft was not picked up by a professional club as a youth and had transitioned into local amateur leagues when he signed for Kilmarnock in 2010. He made his senior debut for the club on 11 May 2013, as a substitute in a 3–2 victory against Dundee in the Scottish Premier League and then four days later scored his first career goal in a 3–1 loss against Hibernian. On 14 May 2013, Ashcroft signed a new contract with Kilmarnock, keeping him at the club until 2016. He captained Kilmarnock for the first time on 4 April 2015, aged 21, in a 2–1 defeat to Motherwell at Rugby Park. On 23 May 2016, he was one of six players released at the end of their contract.

=== Dunfermline Athletic ===
On 25 May 2016, Ashcroft signed for recently promoted Scottish Championship side Dunfermline Athletic, making his first start for the club in a 3–0 victory over Arbroath in the Scottish League Cup. His first goal for the club was versus Fife rivals Cowdenbeath in the same competition, where he scored from a Kallum Higginbotham free-kick. Ashcroft's first league match for the Pars was versus Dumbarton, and saw him concede a late penalty and receive a straight red for his last-man challenge on former Dunfermline striker Robert Thomson, though Dunfermline ended the match as 4–3 winners.

Ashcroft spent four seasons with the Pars and captained the club for the 2018–19 season. He was released by the club in May 2020 following the expiry of his contract, having appeared in over 160 matches.

=== Dundee ===
In July 2020, Ashcroft signed a two-year deal with Dundee. A regular starter throughout the season, Ashcroft scored his first competitive goal for the Dee in a Scottish Cup win against Bonnyrigg Rose Athletic. Ashcroft would score his first and second league goals for them in an away win against Alloa Athletic. At the end of the league season, Ashcroft was awarded the Andrew De Vries Player of the Year award, as well as the Player's Player of the Year award. Ashcroft was also named to PFA Scotland's Championship Team of the Year for 2020–21. Along with his impressive defensive performances, Ashcroft would amass 7 goals in all competitions, including one in the 2nd leg of the Premiership play-offs final, and was a major factor in helping Dundee gain promotion to the Scottish Premiership. Ashcroft would also be named to the SPFL's Championship Team of the Season.

During a game against Motherwell in December 2021, Ashcroft would damage a tendon in his hamstring which would require surgery and keep him out for approximately 3–4 months. While out with injury, Ashcroft would sign a contract extension with Dundee, keeping him at the club until the summer of 2023. Ashcroft made his return from injury off the bench in a league game against Hibernian in March 2022. After just two starts however, Ashcroft would experience a recurrence of the hamstring injury against Rangers that would end his season and required surgery again.

Ashcroft would make his return for Dundee off the bench in an away league win over Raith Rovers in August. He would score in his first start of the season in a Scottish League Cup win over Falkirk. Ashcroft would start every game after in a very successful season which would culminate in scoring a goal in the win over Queen's Park which clinched the Scottish Championship title for the Dark Blues. Ashcroft would be named to PFA Scotland's Scottish Championship Team of the Year at the end of the season, as well as being named in the SPFL's Championship Team of the Season.

On 2 June 2023, Dundee announced that Ashcroft had signed a new two-year contract, keeping him there until the summer of 2025. After struggling for game time under new manager Tony Docherty, Ashcroft returned to the first team in January 2024 following injuries in defence, and would score his first goal of the season on 30 January to help Dundee earn a point away to Aberdeen. Despite breaking back into the Dundee squad, a combination of returning squad depth and interest from clubs promising regular playing time made Ashcroft available for a loan, and on 21 February he joined Championship club Raith Rovers on loan until the end of the season. Ashcroft made his debut on 24 February away to Ayr United, but had to come off in the first half after suffering a hamstring injury. Rovers manager Ian Murray confirmed in March that Ashcroft would be out for the season.

On 24 June 2024, Dundee announced that Ashcroft had left the club as his contract had been terminated by mutual consent.

=== Partick Thistle ===
The day following his departure from Dundee, Ashcroft joined Scottish Championship club Partick Thistle on a two-year deal. Ashcroft made his debut on 13 July 2024 as a substitute in a 3–2 win over Montrose in the Scottish League Cup group stage, and assisted the winning goal.

Ashcroft was named club captain of Thistle in June 2025. On 15 July 2025, Ashcroft scored his first goal for Thistle in a 2–0 home win over Stranraer in the Scottish League Cup group stages.

== Career statistics ==
As of 18 July 2026

Appearances and goals by club, season and competition
| Club | Season | League | | | National Cup | | League Cup | | Other | | Total | |
| Club | Season | Division | Apps | Goals | Apps | Goals | Apps | Goals | Apps | Goals | Apps | Goals |
|---|---|---|---|---|---|---|---|---|---|---|---|---|
| Kilmarnock | 2012–13 | Scottish Premier League | 3 | 1 | 0 | 0 | 0 | 0 | 0 | 0 | 3 | 1 |
| Kilmarnock | 2013–14 | Scottish Premiership | 25 | 1 | 0 | 0 | 0 | 0 | 0 | 0 | 25 | 1 |
| Kilmarnock | 2014–15 | Scottish Premiership | 22 | 2 | 0 | 0 | 0 | 0 | 0 | 0 | 22 | 2 |
| Kilmarnock | 2015–16 | Scottish Premiership | 15 | 0 | 2 | 0 | 2 | 0 | 2 (Note: Appearances in the Scottish Premiership play-offs) | 0 | 21 | 0 |
| Kilmarnock | Total | | 65 | 4 | 2 | 0 | 2 | 0 | 2 | 0 | 71 | 4 |
| Dunfermline Athletic | 2016–17 | Scottish Championship | 35 | 1 | 4 | 0 | 4 | 1 | 3 (Note: Appearances in the Scottish Challenge Cup) | 2 | 46 | 4 |
| Dunfermline Athletic | 2017–18 | Scottish Championship | 33 | 4 | 1 | 0 | 5 | 0 | 4 (Note: Two appearances in the Scottish Challenge Cup and two appearances in the Scottish Premiership play-offs) | 0 | 43 | 4 |
| Dunfermline Athletic | 2018–19 | Scottish Championship | 36 | 0 | 1 | 0 | 5 | 0 | 2 | 0 | 44 | 0 |
| Dunfermline Athletic | 2019–20 | Scottish Championship | 25 | 2 | 0 | 0 | 5 | 0 | 1 | 0 | 31 | 2 |
| Dunfermline Athletic | Total | | 129 | 7 | 6 | 0 | 19 | 1 | 10 | 2 | 164 | 10 |
| Dundee | 2020–21 | Scottish Championship | 25 | 5 | 2 | 1 | 2 | 0 | 4 (Note: Appearances in the Premiership play-offs) | 1 | 33 | 7 |
| Dundee | 2021–22 | Scottish Premiership | 16 | 1 | 1 | 0 | 5 | 1 | 0 | 0 | 22 | 2 |
| Dundee | 2022–23 | Scottish Championship | 34 | 2 | 2 | 0 | 2 | 1 | 4 | 0 | 42 | 3 |
| Dundee | 2023–24 | Scottish Premiership | 8 | 1 | 1 | 0 | 4 | 0 | 0 | 0 | 13 | 1 |
| Dundee | Total | | 83 | 9 | 6 | 1 | 13 | 2 | 8 | 1 | 110 | 13 |
| Raith Rovers (loan) | 2023–24 | Scottish Championship | 1 | 0 | — | | — | | 0 | 0 | 1 | 0 |
| Partick Thistle | 2024–25 | Scottish Championship | 33 | 0 | 1 | 0 | 3 | 0 | 3 (Note: Appearance(s) in the Scottish Premiership play-offs) | 0 | 40 | 0 |
| Partick Thistle | 2025–26 | Scottish Championship | 30 | 0 | 4 | 0 | 6 | 1 | 4 (Note: 2 appearances in the Scottish Premiership play-offs) | 0 | 44 | 1 |
| Partick Thistle | 2026–27 | Scottish Championship | 0 | 0 | 0 | 0 | 2 | 0 | 0 | 0 | 2 | 0 |
| Partick Thistle | Total | | 63 | 0 | 5 | 0 | 11 | 1 | 7 | 0 | 86 | 1 |
| Career total | | | 341 | 20 | 19 | 1 | 45 | 4 | 27 | 3 | 432 | 28 |

== Honours ==
=== Club ===
Dundee

- Scottish Premiership play-offs: 2020–21
- Scottish Championship: 2022–23

=== Individual ===
Dundee

- Andrew De Vries Player of the Year: 2020–21
- Players' Player of the Year: 2020–21
- PFA Scotland Championship Team of the Year: 2020–21, 2022–23
- SPFL Championship Team of the Season: 2020–21, 2022–23
