= Casper Nilsson =

Swedish footballer (born 2003)

Personal information
- Full name: Casper Hugo Nilsson
- Date of birth: 26 November 2003 (age 22)
- Place of birth: Sweden
- Height: 1.88 m (6 ft 2 in)
- Position: Right back

Team information
- Current team: BK Olympic
- Number: 3

Youth career
- 2015–2020: Malmö FF
- 2020–2022: Brighton & Hove Albion

Senior career*
Years	Team	Apps	(Gls)
2022–2025	Brighton & Hove Albion	0	(0)
2024–2025	→ Partick Thistle (loan)	3	(0)
2025	Ängelholms FF	11	(0)
2025–	BK Olympic	42	(7)

International career^{‡}
2019–2020	Sweden U17	13	(0)
2021–2023	Sweden U19	6	(0)
2023	Sweden U21	2	(0)
- * Club domestic league appearances and goals as of 16 November 2026 ‡ National team caps and goals as of 17:07, 16 October 2024 (UTC)

Casper Hugo Nilsson (born 26 November 2003) is a Swedish footballer who plays as a defender for Swedish third tier side BK Olympic. Nilsson has previously played with Ängelholms FF, as well as having had a loan spell with Scottish club Partick Thistle.

Nilsson is a native of Ystad, Sweden. Nilsson joined the youth academy of English Premier League side Brighton at the age of sixteen.

Nilsson debuted for the Sweden national under-21 football team in March 2023. Nilsson mainly operates as a right-back.

== Club career ==
=== Brighton & Hove Albion ===
Nilsson made the step up from academy to under 23 with Brighton in 2022. On 3 February 2025 Nilsson was released by Brighton.

=== Partick Thistle (loan) ===
Nilsson made his first move into senior football, signing on a season long loan with Scottish Championship side Partick Thistle in August 2024. On 3 February 2025 his loan agreement was ended.

=== Ängelholms FF ===
Following his departure from Brighton, Nilsson signed for Swedish third tier side Ängelholms FF

== Career statistics ==
As of match played 8 November 2025

Appearances and goals by club, season and competition
Club	Season	League			National cup (Note: Includes Scottish Cup)		League cup (Note: Includes Scottish League Cup)		Other		Total	
Club	Season	Division	Apps	Goals	Apps	Goals	Apps	Goals	Apps	Goals	Apps	Goals
Brighton & Hove Albion U21	2022–23	—			—		—		1 (Note: Appearance(s) in EFL Trophy)	0	1	0
Brighton & Hove Albion U21	2023–24	—			—		—		5	0	5	0
Brighton & Hove Albion U21	2024–25	—			—		—		0	0	0	0
Brighton & Hove Albion U21	Total		—		—		—		6	0	6	0
Partick Thistle (loan)	2024–25	Scottish Championship	3	0	0	0	0	0	1 (Note: Appearance(s) in Scottish Challenge Cup)	0	4	0
Ängelholms FF	2025	Ettan	11	0	0	0	—		—		11	0
BK Olympic	2025	Ettan	13	1	0	0	—		—		13	1
Career total			27	1	0	0	0	0	7	0	34	1
