= Charlie Sayers =

English professional footballer

Personal information
- Full name: Charlie Sayers
- Date of birth: 29 April 2004 (age 22)
- Place of birth: Southend-on-Sea, England
- Height: 1.88 m (6 ft 2 in)
- Position: Defender

Team information
- Current team: Salisbury

Youth career
- Billericay Town
- –2020: Bowers & Pitsea
- 2020–2021: Southend United

Senior career*
Years	Team	Apps	(Gls)
2021	Southend United	6	(0)
2021–2024	Tottenham Hotspur	0	(0)
2024–2025	Partick Thistle	7	(0)
2025	Woking	1	(0)
2025–2026	Hampton & Richmond Borough	30	(1)
2026	Dorking Wanderers	11	(0)
2026–	Salisbury	0	(0)
- * Club domestic league appearances and goals as of 17:08, 18 November 2026 (UTC)

Charlie Sayers (born 29 March 2004) is an English professional footballer who plays as a defender for National League South club Salisbury.

== Career ==
Sayers began his career locally with Billericay Town and Bowers & Pitsea before moving onto Southend United, breaking through as a 17 year old. Sayers joined English Premier League club Tottenham Hotspur for an undisclosed fee in December 2021. Sayers was released by Spurs in 2024.

Sayers joined Scottish Championship club Partick Thistle on a three-year deal in August 2024. Sayers made his Thistle debut coming off the bench in a 2–1 away defeat to Falkirk in the Scottish Championship. Sayers left Thistle by mutual consent in January 2025, just six months into his three year deal.

On 28 March 2025, Sayers joined National League side, Woking. On 6 May 2025, it was announced that Sayers would leave the club upon the expiry of his contract in June.

On 9 August 2025, following his departure from Woking, Sayers joined National League South side, Hampton & Richmond Borough.

On 26 May 2026, it was announced that Sayers would join Dorking Wanderers following his departure from Hampton & Richmond Borough.

On 18 November 2026, Sayers joined fellow National League South side, Salisbury.

== Career statistics ==
As of match played 14 November 2026.

Appearances and goals by club, season and competition
Club	Season	League			FA Cup		EFL Cup		Other		Total	
Club	Season	Division	Apps	Goals	Apps	Goals	Apps	Goals	Apps	Goals	Apps	Goals
Southend United	2021–22	National League	6	0	0	0	—		0	0	6	0
Tottenham Hotspur	2021–22	Premier League	0	0	0	0	0	0	0	0	0	0
Tottenham Hotspur	2022–23	Premier League	0	0	0	0	0	0	0	0	0	0
Tottenham Hotspur	2023–24	Premier League	0	0	0	0	0	0	—		0	0
Tottenham Hotspur	Total		0	0	0	0	0	0	0	0	0	0
Tottenham Hotspur U21	2023–24	—			—		—		3 (Note: Appearances in the EFL Trophy)	0	3	0
Partick Thistle	2024–25	Scottish Championship	7	0	0	0	0	0	1 (Note: Appearance in the Scottish Challenge Cup)	0	8	0
Woking	2024–25	National League	1	0	—		—		0	0	1	0
Hampton & Richmond Borough	2025–26	National League South	30	1	1	0	—		1 (Note: Appearance in the FA Trophy)	0	32	1
Dorking Wanderers	2026–27	National League South	11	0	2	0	—		1	0	14	0
Salisbury	2026–27	National League South	0	0	—		—		—		0	0
Career total			55	1	3	0	0	0	6	0	64	1
