= Alex Samuel =

Welsh footballer (born 1995)

Personal information
- Full name: Alexander Kinloch Samuel
- Date of birth: 20 September 1995 (age 31)
- Place of birth: Neath, Wales
- Positions: Winger; forward

Team information
- Current team: Partick Thistle
- Number: 9

Youth career
- 2008–2011: Aberystwyth Town

Senior career*
Years	Team	Apps	(Gls)
2011–2012	Aberystwyth Town	9	(0)
2012–2017	Swansea City	0	(0)
2015–2016	→ Greenock Morton (loan)	26	(2)
2017	→ Newport County (loan)	18	(2)
2017–2018	Stevenage	22	(0)
2018–2021	Wycombe Wanderers	72	(6)
2021–2025	Ross County	51	(3)
2024	→ Inverness Caledonian Thistle (loan)	14	(4)
2025–	Partick Thistle	48	(9)

International career
2012	Wales U18	3	(2)
- * Club domestic league appearances and goals as of 18:33, 21 November 2026 (UTC)

Alexander Kinloch Samuel (born 20 September 1995) is a Welsh professional footballer who plays as a forward for Scottish Championship club Partick Thistle.

Samuel began his career in the youth academy at Aberystwyth Town, breaking into the first team during the 2011–12 season. He joined Swansea City's academy in the summer of 2012 and spent time on loan at Greenock Morton and Newport County. He signed for Stevenage ahead of the 2017–18 season, spending one year at the club before joining Wycombe Wanderers of League One in August 2018.

He spent three seasons at Wycombe, scoring 11 goals in 88 appearances and helping the club earn promotion to the Championship. Samuel joined Ross County of the Scottish Premiership on a free transfer in August 2021, but his time there was limited by injuries. He spent the second half of the 2023–24 season on loan at Inverness Caledonian Thistle, was released by Ross County in June 2025, and signed for Partick Thistle in August 2025. He has also represented Wales at under-18 level.

== Club career ==
=== Aberystwyth Town ===
Samuel started his career at Cymru Premier club Aberystwyth Town, progressing through the club's academy. While still in the academy, he briefly joined boyhood club Swansea City, but travelling difficulties led to a return to Aberystwyth. He trained with the Aberystwyth first team in the opening months of the 2011–12 season while continuing to feature for the under-16 team. Samuel made his senior debut two weeks after his 16th birthday, coming on as a 77th-minute substitute in a 2–0 away defeat to Llanelli Town on 8 October 2011. In his third appearance, he came off the substitutes' bench to score a late equaliser in Aberystwyth's 1–1 Welsh Cup draw with Llandudno in January 2012. He made nine first-team appearances that season in all competitions, scoring once.

=== Swansea City and loan spells ===
Following his first-team involvement at Aberystwyth, Samuel attracted transfer interest from several Premier League clubs, including Aston Villa, Manchester United, Newcastle United, and Swansea City. He chose to join Swansea, where he had briefly spent time two years earlier, signing a two-year scholarship in the summer of 2012. He spent the next two seasons in Swansea's academy before signing his first professional contract on 30 May 2014. Samuel played regularly for the Swansea City under-21 team during the 2014–15 season, helping them win the Professional Development League Two title. At the end of the season, he signed a two-year contract extension to remain at the club until the summer of 2017.

Samuel joined Greenock Morton of the Scottish Championship on loan on transfer deadline day in early September 2015, a move he said he "knew straight away" he wanted to take. He signed an initial four-month loan deal, running until January 2016. Samuel made his Morton debut as a 78th-minute substitute for Romario Sabajo in a 4–2 away victory at Livingston on 5 September 2015. He scored his first two goals for the club in a 3–2 extra-time Scottish League Cup victory over Motherwell at Cappielow in his fourth appearance for the club. His first Scottish League goal came in the Renfrewshire derby, a close-range equaliser in a 1–1 draw away at St Mirren on 20 November 2015. In January 2016, his loan was extended for the rest of the 2015–16 season. A month later, he briefly returned to Swansea to receive treatment on a knee injury sustained in a Development League West match against Queen's Park. The injury sidelined him for a month, but he returned as a late substitute in a 3–2 victory against Queen of the South on 15 March 2016. Samuel featured predominantly from the substitutes' bench for the remainder of the season, finishing his time at Morton with 30 appearances and four goals in all competitions, as the club placed fifth in the Scottish Championship.

Upon returning to Swansea, Samuel began the 2016–17 season playing regularly for the Swansea City under-23 team, also making three appearances in the EFL Trophy, scoring in a 2–1 group-stage win away to Newport County on 4 October 2016. Having yet to make a senior appearance for Swansea, he joined League Two club Newport County on loan on 13 January 2017. He made his Newport debut as a 29th-minute substitute in a 0–0 draw away at Barnet on 21 January 2017. After coming on as a substitute in his first three games, Samuel started every subsequent match, scoring his first goal in a 3–1 home defeat to Blackpool on 18 March 2017. Samuel made 18 appearances and scored twice during the five-month loan, as Newport secured their League Two status by winning five of their final seven games. He was named the club's Player of the Year at the end of the season.

=== Stevenage ===
Samuel signed for League Two club Stevenage on a two-year deal on 9 May 2017, joining on a free transfer. He made his Stevenage debut on the opening day of the 2017–18 season, playing the first 57 minutes in a 3–3 draw against former club Newport County at Broadhall Way. His first goal for Stevenage came in the club's 6–2 EFL Trophy defeat to Oxford United on 29 August 2017, when he capitalised on a defensive slip to score a late consolation. Samuel made 28 appearances across the season, of which 16 were from the substitutes' bench, and scored four goals. A "mystery ankle injury" restricted him to just five appearances during the second half of the 2017–18 season, and he was released in May 2018.

=== Wycombe Wanderers ===
After undergoing ankle surgery, Samuel turned down contract offers from Newport County and Yeovil Town. He signed for newly promoted League One club Wycombe Wanderers on 23 August 2018, initially on a short-term contract until 20 January 2019. Wycombe manager Gareth Ainsworth stated he had been impressed by his performance in a match between Wycombe and Stevenage in December 2017. He made his debut on 28 August 2018, coming on as an 80th-minute substitute for Adebayo Akinfenwa in an EFL Cup match against Forest Green Rovers, which Wycombe won on penalties. He scored his first goal in a 2–1 victory against Fulham under-21s at Adams Park in the EFL Trophy on 18 September 2018. Samuel signed a contract extension until June 2021 on 16 November 2018, with Ainsworth praising his work ethic and character. He was a regular starter for Wycombe throughout the 2018–19 season, scoring six goals in 36 games as Wycombe finished 17th in League One. Samuel was named Wycombe's Young Player of the Year at the club's end-of-season awards.

A month into the 2019–20 season, Samuel signed a one-year contract extension on 5 September 2019, with the new agreement running until June 2022. He sustained an injury in a 1–0 defeat away to Gillingham later that month, which kept him out of the first team until November 2019. He made 27 appearances over the course of the season, scoring four goals. That total included three appearances and one goal in the League One play-offs. Samuel started the final at Wembley Stadium, playing 62 minutes as Wycombe defeated Oxford United 2–1 to secure promotion on 13 July 2020. He made 23 appearances in the Championship during the following season, scoring once, as Wycombe were relegated back to League One after finishing in 22nd place.

=== Ross County ===
Samuel signed for Scottish Premiership club Ross County on a two-year contract on 31 August 2021, joining on a free transfer following his departure from Wycombe by mutual consent. He debuted for Ross County in a 3–0 defeat to Celtic on 11 September 2021. Later that season, he suffered an anterior cruciate ligament injury that sidelined him for a year. Samuel returned to the first team on 21 January 2023, appearing as a substitute in extra time during a Scottish FA Cup penalty shoot-out defeat to Hamilton Academical. He scored his first goal in a 2–0 victory against Livingston on 6 May 2023, and made 13 appearances during the second half of that season, helping the club retain its Premiership status with a comeback win over Partick Thistle in the Premiership play-off final. Samuel signed a new two-year contract on 27 June 2023, with the club highlighting his impact following his return from injury.

==== Loan to Inverness Caledonian Thistle ====
Having made 14 appearances for Ross County during the first half of the 2023–24 season, Samuel joined Highland rivals Inverness Caledonian Thistle on 19 January 2024, on a loan agreement until the end of the season. He scored on his debut the following day in a 4–0 victory over Broomhill, and followed this up with a nine-minute hat-trick, the first of his senior career, in a 3–2 win away to Raith Rovers on 27 January 2024. Samuel finished the loan spell with six goals in 19 appearances, as Inverness were relegated to Scottish League One after a play-off final defeat to Hamilton.

Samuel returned to Ross County and featured regularly during the first half of the 2024–25 season. He sustained a thigh injury in the club's 3–1 defeat to Hibernian on 14 December 2024, which sidelined him until March 2025. He made 29 appearances and scored twice during the season, as Ross County were relegated to the Scottish Championship via the Premiership play-offs. Samuel left the club following the expiry of his contract in June 2025.

=== Partick Thistle ===
Following his departure from Ross County, Samuel signed a one-year contract with Scottish Championship club Partick Thistle on 12 August 2025, with the club retaining the option to extend for a further year. He made his debut four days later, as a substitute in a 2–0 win over Ayr United in the Scottish League Cup. Samuel scored his first goal for the club in a 2–1 home victory over Airdrieonians on 12 September 2025, coming on as a second-half substitute and scoring the decisive goal.

In March 2026, Partick Thistle activated the option in Samuel’s contract to extend his deal by a further year.

== International career ==
Samuel represented Wales at under-18 level. He made his debut in a 2–1 victory over the Republic of Ireland in February 2012, scoring the winning goal.

== Style of play ==
Samuel has been described by manager Gareth Ainsworth as an energetic, direct player, noted for his persistence and willingness to press opponents. His strong work ethic has been highlighted, with Samuel also identifying it as one of his key attributes, stating that he always commits fully and believes supporters value that aspect of his game.

== Personal life ==
Samuel is a Christian. He married in 2017; his wife, Rachael, is a singer.

== Career statistics ==
As of match played 3 November 2026

Appearances and goals by club, season and competition
Club	Season	League			National cup (Note: Includes Welsh Cup, FA Cup, Scottish Cup)		League cup (Note: Includes Welsh League Cup, EFL Cup, Scottish League Cup)		Other		Total	
Club	Season	Division	Apps	Goals	Apps	Goals	Apps	Goals	Apps	Goals	Apps	Goals
Aberystwyth Town	2011–12	Welsh Premier League	9	0	1	1	1	0	0	0	11	1
Swansea City	2015–16	Premier League	0	0	0	0	0	0	0	0	0	0
Swansea City	2016–17	Premier League	0	0	0	0	0	0	0	0	0	0
Swansea City	Total		0	0	0	0	0	0	0	0	0	0
Swansea City U23s	2016–17	Professional Development League	—		—		—		3 (Note: Appearances in EFL Trophy)	1	3	1
Greenock Morton (loan)	2015–16	Scottish Championship	26	2	3	0	1	2	0	0	30	4
Newport County (loan)	2016–17	League Two	18	2	0	0	0	0	0	0	18	2
Stevenage	2017–18	League Two	22	0	3	1	1	0	2	3	28	4
Wycombe Wanderers	2018–19	League One	30	5	1	0	2	0	3	1	36	6
Wycombe Wanderers	2019–20	League One	21	1	2	1	1	1	3 (Note: Appearances in the 2020 English Football League play-offs)	1	27	4
Wycombe Wanderers	2020–21	Championship	21	0	1	1	1	0	0	0	23	1
Wycombe Wanderers	2021–22	League One	0	0	0	0	2	0	0	0	2	0
Wycombe Wanderers	Total		72	6	4	2	6	1	6	2	88	11
Ross County	2021–22	Scottish Premiership	5	0	1	0	0	0	—		6	0
Ross County	2022–23	Scottish Premiership	10	1	1	0	0	0	2 (Note: Appearances in 2023 Scottish Premiership play-offs)	0	13	1
Ross County	2023–24	Scottish Premiership	14	0	0	0	2	0	—		16	0
Ross County	2024–25	Scottish Premiership	22	2	0	0	5	0	2 (Note: Appearances in 2025 Scottish Premiership play-offs)	0	29	2
Ross County	Total		51	3	2	0	7	0	4	0	64	3
Inverness CT (loan)	2023–24	Scottish Championship	14	4	1	1	—		4 (Note: Appearances in 2024 Scottish Championship play-offs)	1	19	6
Partick Thistle	2025–26	Scottish Championship	32	9	4	1	2	0	6 (Note: Two appearances and two goals in Scottish Challenge Cup; four appearances and one goal in 2026 Scottish Premiership play-offs)	3	44	13
Partick Thistle	2026–27	Scottish Championship	13	0	0	0	5	2	0	1	19	3
Partick Thistle	Total		45	9	4	1	7	2	7	4	63	16
Career total			258	26	18	6	23	5	26	11	329	48

== Honours ==
Wycombe Wanderers

- EFL League One play-offs: 2020

Individual

- Newport County Player of the Year: 2016–17
