= Sean McArdle (footballer) =

Scottish footballer

Personal information
- Date of birth: 27 August 2007 (age 19)
- Place of birth: Mauchline, Scotland
- Position: Midfielder

Team information
- Current team: Celtic

Youth career
- Celtic

Senior career*
| Years | Team | Apps | (Gls) |
| 2024– | Celtic B | 40 | (5) |
| 2025– | Celtic | 2 | (0) |
| 2025 | → Partick Thistle (loan) | 5 | (0) |

International career^{‡}
| 2025- | Scotland U19 | 4 | (0) |
- * Club domestic league appearances and goals as of 00:39, 3 January 2026 (UTC) ‡ National team caps and goals as of 22 November 2025

Sean Patrick McArdle (born 27 August 2007) is a Scottish professional footballer who plays as a midfielder for Celtic.

== Club career ==
=== Celtic ===
On 16 October 2023, McArdle signed his first professional contract with Celtic, committing his future to the club until 2026. He was promoted to the club’s B-team ahead of the 2024–25 season, featuring in the Lowland Football League. McArdle made his senior and professional debut for Celtic on 10 May 2025, coming off the bench in a 3–1 Scottish Premiership victory over Hibernian.

=== Partick Thistle (loan) ===
On 1 October 2025, McArdle joined Scottish Championship club Partick Thistle on a season-long loan.He made six substitute appearances across all competitions before being recalled by Celtic in January 2026.

== Honours ==
Celtic

- Scottish Premiership: 2024–25
