= Aidan Fitzpatrick =

Scottish footballer

Personal information
- Full name: Aidan Fitzpatrick
- Date of birth: 20 March 2001 (age 25)
- Place of birth: Glasgow, Scotland
- Position: Winger

Team information
- Current team: Partick Thistle
- Number: 21

Youth career
- Partick Thistle

Senior career*
Years	Team	Apps	(Gls)
2017–2019	Partick Thistle	21	(3)
2019–2021	Norwich City	0	(0)
2020–2021	→ Queen of the South (loan)	22	(2)
2021–2022	Queen of the South	12	(2)
2022–	Partick Thistle	151	(16)

International career^{‡}
2017–2018	Scotland U17	5	(0)
2018–2019	Scotland U18	3	(0)
2019	Scotland U19	2	(0)
- * Club domestic league appearances and goals as of 18:36, 21 November 2026 (UTC) ‡ National team caps and goals as of 18:18, 13 July 2021 (UTC)

Aidan Fitzpatrick (born 20 March 2001) is a Scottish professional footballer who plays as a winger for Scottish Championship club Partick Thistle and has previously played for Norwich City and Queen of the South.

== Club career ==
=== Partick Thistle (first spell) ===
From Partick in Glasgow, Fitzpatrick started playing football at St Peters Primary School. He was recommended to Partick Thistle and progressed through the club's youth system.

Fitzpatrick debuted for the first-team versus Albion Rovers in the 2018–19 Scottish League Cup in July 2018, coming on as a substitute and scoring a goal in the 2–0 win. He was the first player born in the 21st century to play for Partick Thistle. On his first starting appearance versus Stranraer in the 2018–19 Scottish Challenge Cup, Fitzpatrick scored two goals and had an assist in a 5–0 victory, winning an Irn-Bru Golden Balls award. He signed a new long-term contract in September 2018. Thistle confirmed in January 2019 that the club had received two bids for Fitzpatrick, one in the summer of 2018 and one in January 2019, however, both bids were turned down.

Fitzpatrick scored his first league goal for Partick Thistle in the 2–1 away win to Inverness Caledonian Thistle in February 2019. The following month, he scored a stoppage time winner for Thistle in a 2–1 home win over Dundee United. In his first season of senior football, Fitzpatrick made 28 appearances for the Firhill club across all competitions, scoring seven goals and having four assists.

=== Norwich City ===
On 5 July 2019, Fitzpatrick signed for Premier League club Norwich City for a fee reported to be in the region of £350,000.

=== Queen of the South ===
On 24 August 2020, Fitzpatrick signed for Scottish Championship club Queen of the South in a season-long loan deal. On 8 September 2021, after securing his contract release from Norwich, he signed a one-year permanent contract with Queen of the South.

=== Partick Thistle (second spell) ===
On 13 July 2022, Fitzpatrick signed a two-year deal with Partick Thistle once again. Although his contract at previous club Queen of the South had expired, the Doonhamers held out for a compensation fee, due to the player still being under 23 years old.

In June 2023 Fitzpatrick extended his contract with Thistle, adding an extra two years on to his deal, extending it until June 2026.

Fitzpatrick signed a new one year contract extension with Thistle in June 2026, extending his deal until summer 2027.

== Career statistics ==
As of match played 06 July 2026

Appearances and goals by club, season and competition
Club	Season	League			National cup		League cup		Other		Total	
Club	Season	Division	Apps	Goals	Apps	Goals	Apps	Goals	Apps	Goals	Apps	Goals
Partick Thistle U20	2017–18	—			—		—		2 (Note: Appearance(s) in Scottish Challenge Cup)	1	2	1
Partick Thistle	2018–19	Scottish Championship	21	3	4	1	3	1	2	2	30	7
Norwich City U21	2019–20	—			—		—		1 (Note: Appearance(s) in EFL Trophy)	0	1	0
Norwich City	2020–21	Championship	0	0	0	0	0	0	—		0	0
Queen of the South (loan)	2020–21	Scottish Championship	22	2	1	1	4	1	—		27	4
Queen of the South	2021–22	Scottish Championship	12	2	0	0	0	0	2	1	14	3
Partick Thistle	2022–23	Scottish Championship	34	1	2	1	4	2	7 (Note: One appearance in Scottish Challenge Cup; Six appearances, one goal in Scottish Premiership play-offs)	3	47	7
Partick Thistle	2023–24	Scottish Championship	34	8	3	3	5	0	5 (Note: One appearance in Scottish Challenge Cup; One appearance in Scottish Premiership play-offs)	0	47	11
Partick Thistle	2024–25	Scottish Championship	35	3	1	0	4	1	5 (Note: One appearance in Scottish Challenge Cup; Four appearances in Scottish Premiership play-offs)	0	45	4
Partick Thistle	2025–26	Scottish Championship	33	4	4	0	6	1	6	1	49	6
Partick Thistle	Total		113	13	6	4	19	4	17	3	155	24
Career total			168	20	11	6	26	6	24	7	229	39
