= Logan Chalmers =

Scottish footballer

Personal information
- Date of birth: 24 March 2000 (age 26)
- Place of birth: Dundee, Scotland
- Height: 5 ft 9 in (1.75 m)
- Position: Winger

Team information
- Current team: St. Johnstone

Youth career
- 2010–2016: Dundee United

Senior career*
Years	Team	Apps	(Gls)
2016–2024	Dundee United	24	(1)
2020	→ Arbroath (loan)	1	(0)
2022	→ Inverness Caledonian Thistle (loan)	12	(5)
2022–2023	→ Ayr United (loan)	11	(2)
2023	→ Tranmere Rovers (loan)	13	(0)
2023–2024	→ Ayr United (loan)	26	(9)
2024–2026	Partick Thistle	64	(15)
2026–	St. Johnstone	7	(0)

International career^{‡}
2016	Scotland U17	1	(0)
2020–2021	Scotland U21	3	(0)
- * Club domestic league appearances and goals as of 17:27, 9 November 2026 (UTC) ‡ National team caps and goals as of 18:24, 30 August 2025 (UTC)

Logan Chalmers (born 24 March 2000) is a Scottish professional footballer who plays as a winger for Scottish Premiership side St. Johnstone. He has also previously played for Partick Thistle and Dundee United, as well as having loan spells at Arbroath, Inverness Caledonian Thistle, twice with Ayr United and Tranmere Rovers.

== Early life ==
Chalmers was born in Dundee on 24 March 2000 and joined the Dundee United Academy at the age of 10. He attended the Scottish Football Association Performance School at St John's Roman Catholic High School in Dundee.

== Club career ==
=== Dundee United ===
Chalmers signed his first professional contract with Dundee United in July 2016. His first involvement with the first team was for Seán Dillon's testimonial match in March 2017. His competitive debut came in the Scottish League Cup in July 2017, when he came on as a substitute in a 4–1 home win over Cowdenbeath. He scored his first senior goal in October 2017, a late winner against Linfield in a Scottish Challenge Cup tie at Tannadice Park.

==== Loan spells ====
Chalmers was loaned to Arbroath in January 2020.

On 21 January 2022, Chalmers joined Scottish Championship side Inverness Caledonian Thistle on loan for the remainder of the 2021–22 season.

He was then loaned to Ayr United in September 2022. After a successful loan spell, Chalmers was recalled on 14 January 2023 amid speculation of a move to England. Two days later, he moved on loan to Tranmere Rovers.

On 19 August 2023, Chalmers returned on a season-long loan to Ayr United.

=== Partick Thistle ===
Chalmers signed a two-year deal with Scottish Championship side Partick Thistle in June 2024. Chalmers scored his first Thistle goal, scoring the winner in a 1–0 away win at Hampden against Queen's Park in the Scottish Championship.

The winger played a key part in Partick Thistle's league campaigns across his two seasons at the club, including 21 goals and assists in all competitions in the 2025–26 season. Chalmers departed Firhill at the conclusion of his contract, despite being offered a new deal to stay with the club.

=== St. Johnstone ===
Logan Chalmers signed a two-year deal with Scottish Premiership side St. Johnstone in June 2026.

== International career ==
Chalmers represented Scotland at under-17 level once, playing against the Czech Republic in August 2016. He was then capped by the under-21 team in October 2020.

== Career statistics ==
As of match played 31 October 2026

Appearances and goals by club, season and competition
Club	Season	League			Scottish Cup		League Cup		Other		Total	
Club	Season	Division	Apps	Goals	Apps	Goals	Apps	Goals	Apps	Goals	Apps	Goals
Dundee United	2016–17	Scottish Championship	0	0	0	0	0	0	0	0	0	0
Dundee United	2017–18	Scottish Championship	2	0	0	0	2	0	3 (Note: Appearances in the Scottish Challenge Cup)	1	7	1
Dundee United	2018–19	Scottish Championship	2	0	0	0	1	0	1	1	4	1
Dundee United	2019–20	Scottish Championship	3	1	0	0	2	0	0	0	5	1
Dundee United	2020–21	Scottish Premiership	15	0	1	0	0	0	0	0	16	0
Dundee United	2021–22	Scottish Premiership	5	0	0	0	3	0	0	0	8	0
Dundee United	2022–23	Scottish Premiership	0	0	0	0	0	0	0	0	0	0
Dundee United	2023–24	Scottish Championship	0	0	0	0	1	0	0	0	1	0
Dundee United	Total		27	1	1	0	9	0	4	2	41	3
Arbroath (loan)	2019–20	Scottish Championship	1	0	2	0	0	0	0	0	3	0
Inverness Caledonian Thistle (loan)	2021–22	Scottish Championship	12	5	0	0	0	0	6	0	18	5
Ayr United (loan)	2022–23	Scottish Championship	11	2	1	0	0	0	0	0	12	2
Tranmere Rovers (loan)	2022–23	English League Two	13	0	0	0	0	0	0	0	13	0
Ayr United (loan)	2023–24	Scottish Championship	26	9	2	0	1	0	1	0	30	9
Partick Thistle	2024–25	Scottish Championship	33	7	1	0	4	0	1	0	39	7
Partick Thistle	2025–26	Scottish Championship	31	8	1	0	6	2	2	1	40	11
Partick Thistle	Total		64	15	2	0	10	2	3	1	79	18
St Johnstone	2026–27	Scottish Premiership	7	0	0	0	4	0	0	0	11	0
Career total			161	32	8	0	24	2	14	3	207	37
