= Ben Stanway =

Scottish professional footballer

Personal information
- Full name: Ben Robert Gordon Stanway
- Date of birth: 20 September 2004 (age 22)
- Place of birth: Glasgow, Scotland
- Height: 1.75 m (5 ft 9 in)
- Position: Central midfielder

Team information
- Current team: Partick Thistle
- Number: 26

Youth career
- Partick Thistle

Senior career*
Years	Team	Apps	(Gls)
2022–	Partick Thistle	90	(13)
2023	→ Airdrieonians (loan)	14	(1)
- * Club domestic league appearances and goals as of 18:10, 7 November 2026 (UTC)

Ben Robert Gordon Stanway (born 20 September 2004) is a Scottish professional footballer who plays as a midfielder for Scottish Championship club Partick Thistle.

== Career ==
=== Partick Thistle ===
Aged 17, Stanway graduated as a modern apprentice from the Thistle Weir Youth academy and joined the clubs first team in January 2022. Stanway made his professional debut, coming on a substitute in a 2–0 away win over Stranraer in the Scottish Challenge Cup.

After making a handful of appearances for Thistle's first team, Stanway joined Scottish League One side Airdrieonians on loan in January 2023, until the end of the season. Stanway made his debut for Airdrie, in which he won a penalty, in a 3–0 away win against Peterhead. Stanway scored his first professional goal, opening the scoring for Airdrie in a 1–1 draw away to league leaders Dunfermline.

After returning to Thistle following his loan spell, Stanway made his first start for Thistle, playing the full 90 minutes in a cup tie away to Peterhead. Stanway scored his first goal for Partick Thistle, with a header in a challenge cup game against Queen of the South. Following breaking into the Partick Thistle first team at the beginning of the 2023–24 season, Stanway signed a new three year professional contract with Partick Thistle until the end of the 2025–26 season.

Stanway scored his first league goal for Thistle away to champions Dundee United, on the final day of the league season in May 2024.

Stanway scored his first goal of the 2024–25 season, scoring the winner with a curling strike from 20 yards, in a 2–1 away win at Hamilton Academical.

Stanway scored his first goal of the 2025–26 season in a 3–1 away victory against Ross County, in the Scottish League Cup group stages.

Stanway signed a new one year extension with Thistle on 30th July 2026.

== Career statistics ==
As of match played 15 May 2026

Appearances and goals by club, season and competition
Club	Season	League			Scottish Cup		Scottish League Cup		Other		Total	
Club	Season	Division	Apps	Goals	Apps	Goals	Apps	Goals	Apps	Goals	Apps	Goals
Partick Thistle	2021–22	Scottish Championship	1	0	0	0	0	0	1 (Note: Appearance(s) in Scottish Challenge Cup)	0	2	0
Partick Thistle	2022–23	Scottish Championship	2	0	0	0	0	0	1	0	3	0
Partick Thistle	2023–24	Scottish Championship	24	1	3	0	5	0	5 (Note: One appearance in Scottish Challenge Cup, four appearances and one goal in Scottish Premiership play-offs)	1	37	2
Partick Thistle	2024–25	Scottish Championship	19	2	0	0	3	0	5 (Note: One appearance in Scottish Challenge Cup, four appearances in Scottish Premiership play-offs)	0	27	2
Partick Thistle	2025–26	Scottish Championship	30	7	4	3	6	1	3	1	43	12
Partick Thistle	Total		76	10	7	3	14	1	13	1	110	15
Airdrieonians (loan)	2022–23	Scottish League One	14	1	—		—		4 (Note: Appearance(s) in Scottish Championship play-offs)	0	18	1
Career total			90	11	7	3	14	1	18	2	130	17
