= Josh Clarke (footballer, born 2004) =

Northern Irish footballer (born 2004)

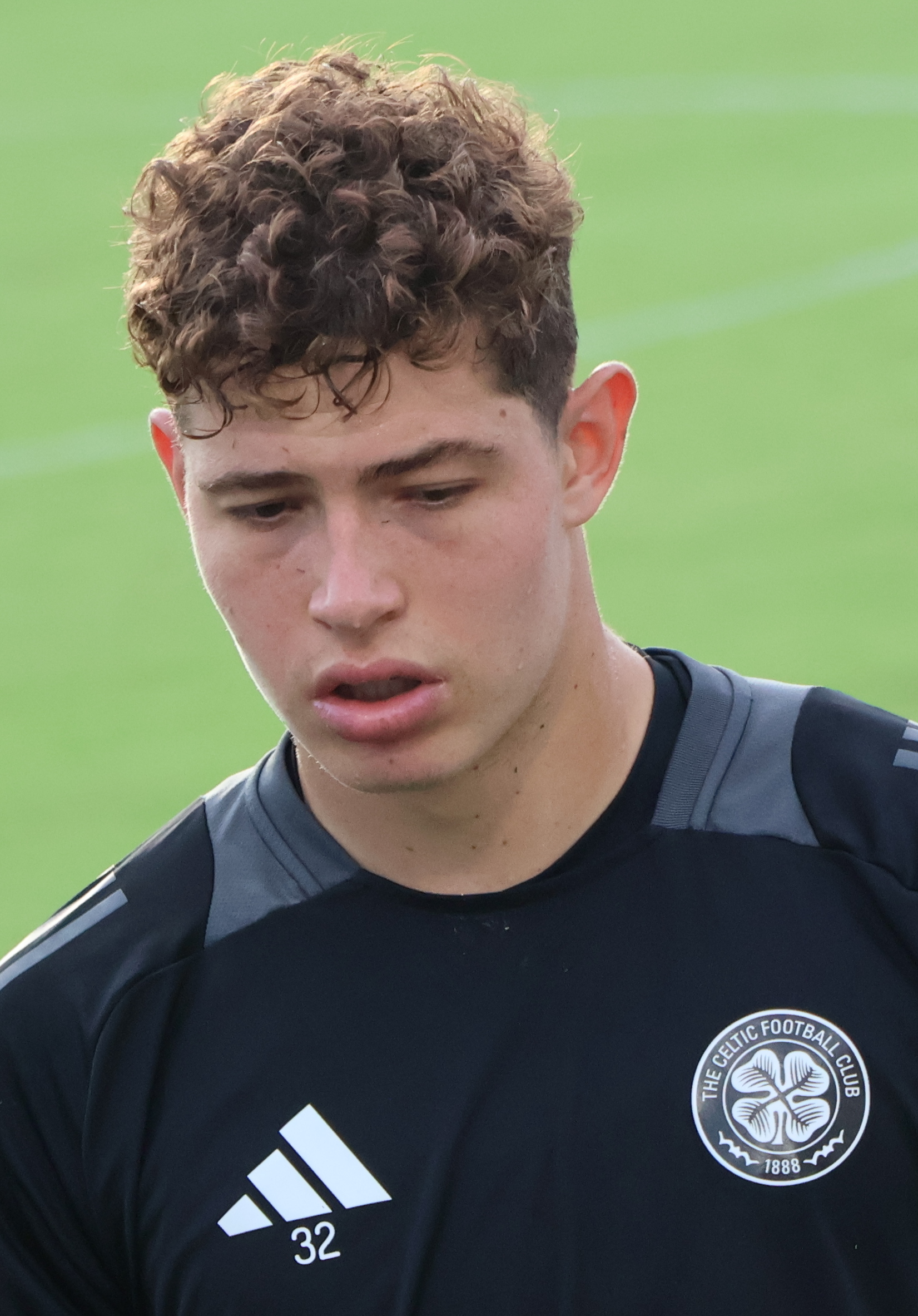
- Clarke training with Celtic in 2024

Personal information
- Full name: Josh Clarke
- Date of birth: 28 July 2004 (age 22)
- Place of birth: London, England
- Height: 1.88 m (6 ft 2 in)
- Position: Goalkeeper

Team information
- Current team: Doncaster Rovers (on loan from Partick Thistle
- Number: 42

Youth career
- 2011–2020: Chelsea
- 2020–2022: Bournemouth

Senior career*
Years	Team	Apps	(Gls)
2022	Glenavon	6	(0)
2022–2026	Celtic B	31	(0)
2023	→ Airdrieonians (loan)	1	(0)
2024	→ Ayr United (loan)	12	(0)
2025	→ Ayr United (loan)	8	(0)
2025–2026	→ Partick Thistle (loan)	33	(0)
2026–	Partick Thistle	0	(0)
2026–	→ Doncaster Rovers (loan)	0	(0)

International career^{‡}
2019	Sweden U17	2	(0)
2021	England U17	1	(0)
2021	Republic of Ireland U18	1	(0)
2021–2023	Northern Ireland U19	10	(0)
2023–	Northern Ireland U21	1	(0)
- * Club domestic league appearances and goals as of 10:43, 8 July 2026 (UTC) ‡ National team caps and goals as of 17:10, 29 June 2023 (UTC)

Josh Clarke (born 28 July 2004) is a professional footballer who plays as a goalkeeper for EFL League One side Doncaster Rovers on loan from Scottish Championship club Partick Thistle. A former youth international for England, Sweden and the Republic of Ireland, Clarke is currently a senior international for Northern Ireland.

== Early life ==
Clarke was born in London to a Swedish mother and an Irish father. As well as playing football, Clarke played cricket and rugby union. He fielded at the boundary in cricket and played rugby as a scrum-half or fly-half, roles he believed transferred to being a goalkeeper. He played rugby for Harlequins at Academy level, and made the Irish Exiles squad, before choosing a football career at 16.

== Club career ==
=== Early career ===
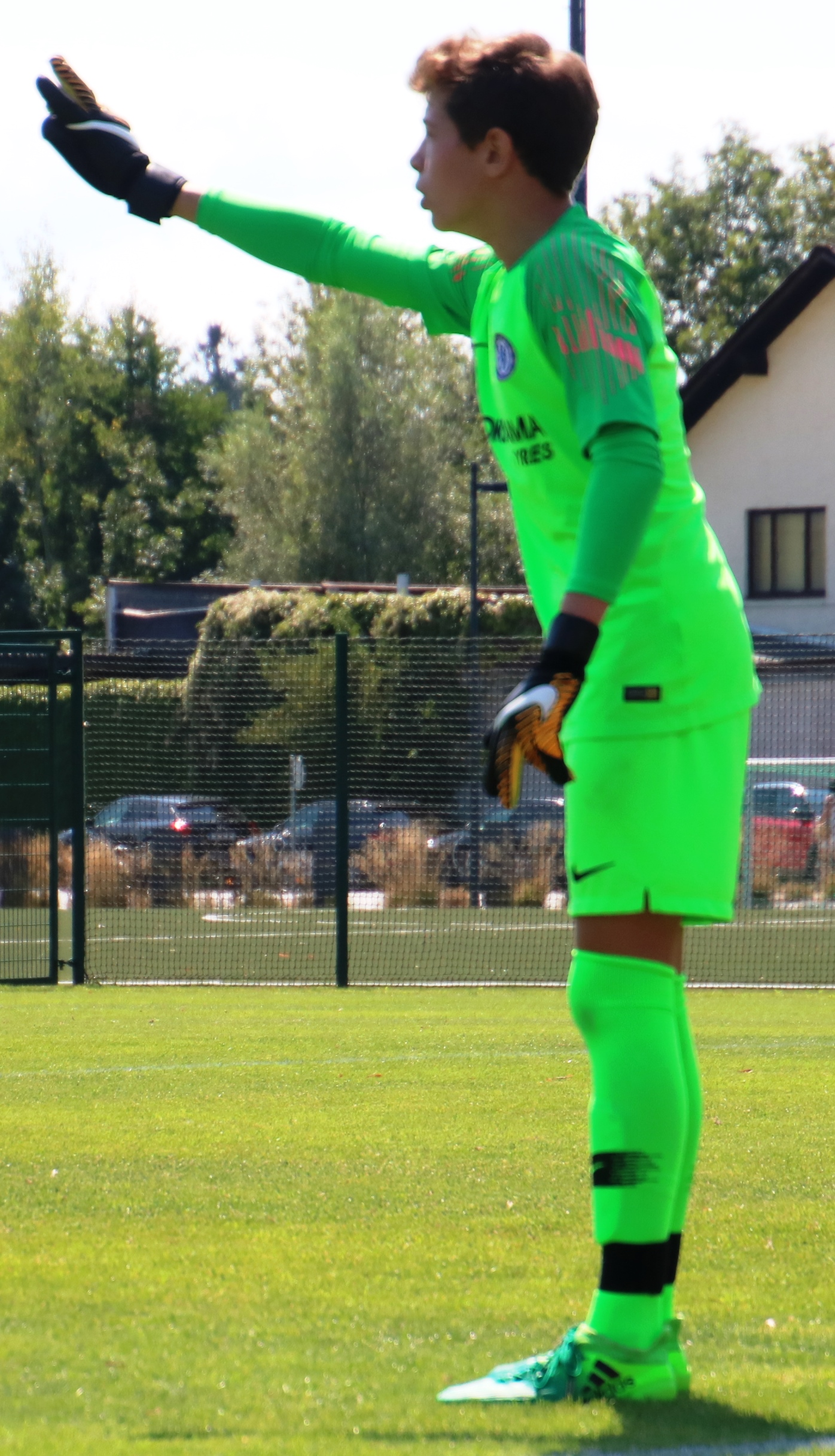
Clarke playing for Chelsea in 2018.

Clarke joined Chelsea's Academy in 2012 at the age of 8 years old. During his time in the academy, he won a Goalkeeper of the Tournament award at the Kevin de Bruyne Cup in 2019, as Chelsea went on to win the youth competition.

Clarke became a scholar at AFC Bournemouth in July 2020. He trained with the first team during his time at the club, and was the backup goalkeeper for an FA Cup fixture against Oldham Athletic in January 2021.

=== Glenavon ===
On 8 April 2022, Northern Irish club Glenavon announced the signing of Clarke. He had been brought in on a short-term, emergency deal, following the departure of Declan Brown and the suspension of James Taylor. He made his debut, as a 17 year old, a day after signing, in a NIFL Premiership game against Ballymena United. After Glenavon defender Danny Wallace was sent off for a foul inside the penalty area, Clarke saved the resulting penalty from Leroy Millar as Glenavon went on to win 3–1. He made five further appearances, including Glenavon's 2–0 away loss to Glentoran in the UEFA Europa Conference League play-offs, in which he made a number of saves. Clarke received the supporters' Player of the Month Award in April 2022.

=== Celtic ===
Clarke moved to Scotland to join Celtic, signing an initial two-year deal in August 2022 and being assigned to the club's B Team. He notably saved four penalties in Celtic B's penalty shoot-out win against Rangers B in the final of the Glasgow Cup, garnering national coverage for his performance.

==== Loan to Airdrieonians ====
On 5 August 2023, Clarke was sent on a one-game emergency loan to Scottish Championship side Airdrieonians, following the absences of first-choice goalkeeper Josh Rae and player-goalkeeper coach David Hutton. He made his debut the same day, as Airdrieonians lost 2–1 to Dunfermline Athletic, before returning to Celtic.

==== Loan to Ayr United ====
On 24 February 2024, Clarke extended his contract at Celtic and Ayr United announced that they had signed Clarke on a loan deal until the end of the season. He made a total of 22 appearances for Ayr United over two spells.

==== Loan to Partick Thistle ====
In July 2025, Clarke joined Scottish Championship club Partick Thistle on a season long loan. The keeper made his debut in a 1–1 league draw with Greenock Morton, going on to make 42 appearances in all competitions, keeping 14 clean sheets. Clarke, alongside fellow Celtic loanee Ben McPherson, agreed a pre-contract deal to join Partick Thistle on a permanent basis in February 2026, coming into effect at the end of the season.

=== Doncaster Rovers ===
Despite joining Partick Thistle permanently after signing a pre contract agreement, on 7 July 2026, it was announced that Clarke had joined EFL League One club Doncaster Rovers on a season-long loan deal with the option to make the move permanent in January, for an undisclosed fee. On 6 September, the option to make the deal permanent was enacted ahead of schedule, on a three-year deal for an undisclosed fee.

== International career ==
In 2019, Clarke was selected to play for Sweden's under-17 team in two friendly matches against Norway and Finland.

In late 2020, he was called up for an England youth training camp at St George's Park. In March of the following year, he featured in a hybrid friendly for the England under-17 team, coming on as a first-half substitute for James Beadle in a 2–1 win over the under-23 side of Watford. In August 2021, he featured in a 2–0 friendly win over Hungary for the Republic of Ireland under-18 side.

In September 2021, Clarke was selected to represent Northern Ireland at under-19 level in two 1–0 friendly wins against the Faroe Islands. He received his second call-up for Northern Ireland in their 2022 UEFA European Under-19 Championship qualification campaign. He was called up again in March 2023, ahead of Northern Ireland's games in the elite round of 2023 UEFA European Under-19 Championship qualification.

In March 2022, Clarke was called up to the senior Northern Irish team for the first time at the age of seventeen, but remained on the bench as Northern Ireland beat Luxembourg 3–1 in a friendly. He was called up again in May of the same year, ahead of UEFA Nations League fixtures the following month against Greece, Cyprus and Kosovo, but again did not feature. After a strong start to his loan spell at Partick Thistle, Clarke was recalled to the senior Northern Ireland squad in November 2025.

== Career statistics ==
As of 28 September 2026

Appearances and goals by club, season and competition
Club	Season	League			National cup (Note: Includes Irish Cup, Scottish Cup and FA Cup)		League cup (Note: Includes Northern Ireland Football League Cup, Scottish League Cup and EFL Cup)		Other		Total	
Club	Season	Division	Apps	Goals	Apps	Goals	Apps	Goals	Apps	Goals	Apps	Goals
Glenavon	2021–22	NIFL Premiership	6	0	0	0	0	0	0	0	6	0
Celtic B	2022–23	Lowland League	18	0	–		–		0	0	18	0
Celtic B	2023–24	Lowland League	13	0	–		–		1 (Note: Appearances in the Scottish Challenge Cup)	0	14	0
Celtic B	Total		31	0	0	0	0	0	1	0	32	0
Airdrieonians (loan)	2023–24	Scottish Championship	1	0	0	0	0	0	0	0	1	0
Ayr United (loan)	2023–24	Scottish Championship	12	0	0	0	0	0	0	0	12	0
Ayr United (loan)	2024–25	Scottish Championship	8	0	0	0	0	0	2 (Note: Appearances in the Scottish Premiership playoffs)	0	10	0
Partick Thistle (loan)	2025–26	Scottish Championship	33	0	4	0	1	0	4	0	42	0
Partick Thistle	2026–27	Scottish Championship	0	0	0	0	0	0	0	0	0	0
Doncaster Rovers (loan)	2026–27	EFL League One	0	0	0	0	1	0	1 (Note: Appearances in the EFL Trophy)	0	2	0
Career total			91	0	4	0	2	0	8	0	105	0
