= Cammy Logan =

Scottish footballer

Personal information
- Date of birth: 28 January 2002 (age 24)
- Position: Defender

Team information
- Current team: Partick Thistle
- Number: 2

Youth career
- Spartans
- Heart of Midlothian

Senior career*
Years	Team	Apps	(Gls)
2018–2023	Heart of Midlothian	1	(0)
2021	→ Cove Rangers (loan)	6	(0)
2022	→ Edinburgh City (loan)	18	(0)
2022–2023	→ Kelty Hearts (loan)	14	(0)
2023	→ Queen of the South (loan)	13	(0)
2023–2024	Queen of the South	35	(0)
2024–2025	Forfar Athletic	28	(1)
2025–	Partick Thistle	21	(0)

International career
2017	Scotland U16	3	(0)
2018–2019	Scotland U17	10	(0)
2019	Scotland U18	2	(0)
- * Club domestic league appearances and goals as of 18:23, 14 November 2026 (UTC)

Cammy Logan (born 28 January 2002) is a Scottish professional footballer who plays as a defender for Partick Thistle. Logan has previously played for Heart of Midlothian and Forfar Athletic, as well as loan spells with Cove Rangers, Edinburgh City, Kelty Hearts and Queen of the South.

== Club career ==
=== Heart of Midlothian ===
Logan debuted for Heart of Midlothian on 13 May 2018, in a 1–0 league defeat away at Kilmarnock. He was one of four Hearts youth players to make their debuts in that match, alongside Chris Hamilton, Leeroy Makovora and Connor Smith.

Logan was loaned to Cove Rangers in January 2021.

On 3 January 2022, Logan joined Scottish League Two side Edinburgh City on loan for the remainder of the season. He was a key part of helping the club gaining promotion to the Scottish League One via the play-offs.

Logan was loaned to Scottish League One club Kelty Hearts in August 2022. He returned to his parent club in January 2023.

Logan was loaned to Scottish League One club Queen of the South in February 2023.

=== Queen of the South ===
Following his loan spell, on 26 June 2023, Logan signed a one-year contract with Queen of the South.

=== Forfar Athletic ===
In October 2024, Logan joined Scottish League Two side Forfar Athletic on a contract until the end of the season. Logan scored the first goal of his professional career, scoring the equaliser in a 1-1 draw with Elgin City.

=== Partick Thistle ===
Following a successful trial period, Logan joined Scottish Championship club Partick Thistle on a one year deal with the option for an additional year.

On 11 July 2025 Logan made his Partick Thistle debut, as well as scoring his first Thistle goal in a 4–1 away victory over his former club Edinburgh City in the Scottish League Cup group stages.

In April 2026 Thistle activated the extension clause in Logan's contract, extending his deal until summer 2027.

== International career ==
Logan has represented both Scotland U16 and Scotland U17.

== Career statistics ==
As of 14 May 2018

Appearances and goals by club, season and competition
Club	Season	League			Scottish Cup		Scottish League Cup		Other		Total	
Club	Season	Division	Apps	Goals	Apps	Goals	Apps	Goals	Apps	Goals	Apps	Goals
Heart of Midlothian	2017–18	Scottish Premiership	1	0	0	0	0	0	0	0	1	0
Career total			1	0	0	0	0	0	0	0	1	0
Heart of Midlothian U20	2018–19	—			—		—		1 (Note: Appearance(s) in Scottish Challenge Cup)	1	1	1
Heart of Midlothian U20	2019–20	—			—		—		3	0	3	0
Heart of Midlothian U20	2020–21	—			—		—		0	0	0	0
Heart of Midlothian U20	2021–22	—			—		—		0	0	0	0
Heart of Midlothian U20	2022–23	—			—		—		1	0	1	0
Heart of Midlothian U20	Total		—		—		—		5	1	5	1
Cove Rangers (loan)	2020–21	Scottish League One	6	0	0	0	—		—		6	0
Edinburgh City (loan)	2021–22	Scottish League Two	18	0	1	0	—		4 (Note: Appearance(s) in Scottish League One play-offs)	0	23	0
Kelty Hearts (loan)	2022–23	Scottish League One	14	0	0	0	0	0	0	0	14	0
Queen of the South (loan)	2022–23	Scottish League One	13	0	—		—		0	0	13	0
Queen of the South	2023–24	Scottish League One	35	0	2	0	4	0	2	0	43	0
Forfar Athletic	2024–25	Scottish League Two	23	1	2	0	0	0	0	0	25	1
Partick Thistle	2025–26	Scottish Championship	6	0	0	0	6	1	0	0	12	1
Career total			116	1	5	0	10	1	11	1	1422	3
