= Liam McFarlane (footballer) =

Scottish footballer (born 2004)

Personal information
- Date of birth: 26 September 2004 (age 22)
- Place of birth: Lochgelly, Scotland
- Height: 6 ft 6 in (1.98 m)
- Position: Goalkeeper

Team information
- Current team: Partick Thistle (on loan from Heart of Midlothian)
- Number: 12

Youth career
- Heart of Midlothian

Senior career*
Years	Team	Apps	(Gls)
2020–2026	Heart of Midlothian B	53	(0)
2021	→ Brechin City (loan)	0	(0)
2022	→ Montrose (loan)	0	(0)
2023	→ Hamilton Academical (loan)	0	(0)
2024–2025	→ East Fife (loan)	31	(0)
2025–2026	→ Alloa Athletic (loan)	29	(0)
2026–	→ Partick Thistle (loan)	11	(0)

International career
2022	Scotland U19	1	(0)
2025–	Scotland U21	3	(0)
- * Club domestic league appearances and goals as of 18:32, 14 November 2026 (UTC)

Liam McFarlane (born 26 September 2004) is a Scottish professional footballer who plays as a goalkeeper for Scottish Championship club Partick Thistle on loan from Scottish Premiership club Heart of Midlothian.

== Club career ==
=== Heart of Midlothian ===
McFarlane joined Scottish Championship club Hamilton Academical on an emergency loan in May 2023.

In December 2023, McFarlane signed a contract extension until summer 2026 with Hearts.

In summer 2024, McFarlane joined Scottish League Two side East Fife on a season long loan.

In August 2025 McFarlane signed a new contract extension with Hearts until 2028.

McFarlane spent the 2025–2026 season on loan at Scottish League One club Alloa Athletic.

==== Partick Thistle (loan) ====
On 17 July 2026, McFarlane joined Scottish Championship club Partick Thistle on a season long loan deal.

== International career ==
McFarlane has played for Scotland at youth level for under 19s and under 21s, as well as being a part of the senior Scotland squad's training camp for the World Cup in summer 2026.
