= Oisin Smyth =

Northern Irish footballer (born 2000)

Personal information
- Full name: Oisin Smyth
- Date of birth: 5 May 2000 (age 26)
- Position: Midfielder

Team information
- Current team: Partick Thistle
- Number: 8

Youth career
- 2012–2018: Dungannon Swifts

Senior career*
Years	Team	Apps	(Gls)
2018–2022	Dungannon Swifts	98	(9)
2022–2024	Oxford United	17	(1)
2023	→ Solihull Moors (loan)	2	(0)
2024–	St Mirren	21	(4)
2025–2026	→ Partick Thistle (loan)	16	(2)
2026	→ Partick Thistle (loan)	9	(2)
2026–	Partick Thistle	14	(3)

International career
- Northern Ireland U21
- * Club domestic league appearances and goals as of 18:30, 14 November 2026 (UTC)

Oisin Smyth (born 5 May 2000) is a Northern Irish professional footballer who plays as a midfielder for Scottish Championship club Partick Thistle.

== Early and personal life ==
Smyth is from Derrytrasna. His father Liam was also a footballer, active in the Irish League. His uncle Pat McGibbon was a Northern Ireland international.

== Club career ==
Smyth began his career with Dungannon Swifts at the age of 12, making his senior debut in October 2018. He became club captain for the 2021–22 season.

=== Oxford United ===
In January 2022, Smyth signed for League One club Oxford United having been linked with a move away from Dungannon Swifts the previous month. On 5 January 2023, Smyth joined National League club Solihull Moors on an initial one-month loan deal. He played three times for Solihull Moors before returning to his parent club.

His first goal for Oxford United, and his first in English football, was a 30-yard winner in a 2–1 away victory over Charlton Athletic on 1 January 2024.

=== St Mirren ===
On 14 June 2024, he signed for St Mirren for an undisclosed fee. Smyth made his St Mirren debut in a Europa Conference League qualifier against Icelandic side Valur. Smyth scored his first and second goal for St Mirren on his league debut for the club, in a 3–0 home win over Hibernian on the opening day of the Scottish Premiership season.

=== Partick Thistle ===
On transfer deadline day in September 2025, Smyth joined Scottish Championship club Partick Thistle on a season long loan. He was recalled in January 2026. After playing two games with St Mirren in January, Smyth rejoined Thistle on loan later that month until the end of the season. Just five games into his return to Thistle, Smyth suffered a partial tear of the posterior cruciate ligament, which ruled him out for a significant period.

Smyth joined Partick Thistle permanently in June 2026, signing a two year deal. After returning to the club permanently, Smyth scored on his second debut, in a 6–0 home win over Brechin City in a Scottish League Cup group stage tie.

== International career ==
Smyth is a Northern Ireland under-21 youth international.
