= Patrick Reading =

Scottish footballer

Personal information
- Full name: Patrick James Reading
- Date of birth: 29 May 1999 (age 27)
- Position: Left-back

Team information
- Current team: Partick Thistle
- Number: 3

Youth career
- 2012–2020: Middlesbrough

Senior career*
Years	Team	Apps	(Gls)
2020	Stevenage	1	(0)
2020–2025	Ayr United	144	(3)
2025–	Partick Thistle	50	(3)

International career^{‡}
2019–2020	Scotland U21	6	(0)
- * Club domestic league appearances and goals as of 18:29, 21 November 2026 (UTC) ‡ National team caps and goals as of 23:19, 7 August 2026 (UTC)

Patrick James Reading (born 29 May 1999) is a Scottish professional footballer who plays as a left-back for club Partick Thistle.

== Club career ==
=== Stevenage ===
Reading spent his youth career at Middlesbrough, before he joined Stevenage on 31 January 2020. Reading made his Stevenage debut, playing the full 90 minutes in a 2–1 loss to Exeter City in League Two.

He was released by Stevenage at the end of the 2019–20 season.

=== Ayr United ===
In July 2020 he signed a two-year deal with Ayr United. Reading scored his first goal for Ayr United in January 2021, in a 3–2 away defeat to Queen of the South.

In May 2022 Reading signed a two year extension to his deal with Ayr United.

On 24 May 2024, Reading signed a further two year extension to his Ayr United contract, extending his deal until 2026.

=== Partick Thistle ===
After five years with Ayr United, Reading joined fellow Scottish Championship club Partick Thistle on a free transfer in June 2025, signing a two year deal. Reading made his Thistle debut in a 4–1 away victory over Edinburgh City in the Scottish League Cup group stages.

Reading scored his first Thistle goal on the opening day of the 2025–26 Scottish Championship season, in an away defeat to St Johnstone.

== International career ==
He has represented Scotland at under-21 level.

== Career statistics ==
As of match played 4 March 2025

Appearances and goals by club, season and competition
Club	Season	League			National cup (Note: Includes FA Cup, Scottish Cup)		League cup (Note: Includes EFL Cup, Scottish League Cup)		Other		Total	
Club	Season	Division	Apps	Goals	Apps	Goals	Apps	Goals	Apps	Goals	Apps	Goals
Middlesbrough U21	2017–18	—			—		—		2 (Note: Appearance(s) in EFL Trophy)	1	2	1
Stevenage	2019–20	League Two	1	0	0	0	0	0	—		1	0
Ayr United	2020–21	Scottish Championship	21	1	2	0	1	0	0	0	24	1
Ayr United	2021–22	Scottish Championship	35	2	2	0	4	0	0	0	41	2
Ayr United	2022–23	Scottish Championship	36	0	4	0	3	0	3 (Note: One appearance in Scottish Challenge Cup, Two appearances in Scottish Premiership play-offs)	0	46	0
Ayr United	2023–24	Scottish Championship	24	0	3	0	5	0	0	0	32	0
Ayr United	2024–25	Scottish Championship	22	0	3	0	4	0	3 (Note: Appearance(s) in Scottish Challenge Cup)	0	32	0
Ayr United	Total		138	3	14	0	17	0	6	0	175	3
Career total			139	3	14	0	17	0	8	1	178	4
