= Tsoanelo Letsosa =

Scottish footballer (born 2004)

Personal information
- Date of birth: June 6, 2004 (age 22)
- Place of birth: Quthing, Lesotho
- Height: 1.73 m (5 ft 8 in)
- Position: Midfielder

Team information
- Current team: Partick Thistle
- Number: 64

Youth career
- –2017: Park Villa
- 2017–2021: Celtic

Senior career*
Years	Team	Apps	(Gls)
2021–2023	Celtic B	32	(3)
2023–2025	Lommel	6	(0)
2025–	Partick Thistle	46	(3)

International career^{‡}
2019	Scotland U16	3	(1)
- * Club domestic league appearances and goals as of 18:40, 21 November 2026 (UTC) ‡ National team caps and goals as of 19 August 2026

Tsoanelo Letsosa, also stylized as Ts'oanelo Lets'osa (born 6 June 2004) is a professional footballer who plays as a midfielder for Scottish Championship club Partick Thistle. Born in Lesotho, he represented Scotland at youth international level.

== Club career ==
=== Celtic ===
Lets'osa began his career in the youth teams of Glasgow-based club Pollok, before aged 12 joining Celtic's youth academy in 2017.

After signing his first professional contract with the Hoops in July 2020, Lets'osa went on to feature for the club's B team in the Lowland League, and established himself as a regular member of the squad throughout the 2022–23 season, while also playing in the UEFA Youth League and contributing to the victory of the Glasgow Cup. During the same campaign, he also started training with the first team under manager Ange Postecoglou.

=== Lommel ===
After leaving Celtic in the summer of 2023, having turned down an offer for a new deal, on 7 July of the same year Lets'osa officially joined Belgian side Lommel on a free transfer, signing a five-year contract with the club.

After two seasons and only seven appearances for Lommel's first team, Lets'osa's contract was terminated by mutual agreement in June 2025.

=== Partick Thistle ===
In July 2025 Lets'osa signed for Scottish Championship club Partick Thistle, returning to Glasgow on a two year deal.

Lets’osa made his Thistle debut, and also scored his first Thistle goal, in a 2–0 home win over Queen of the South in the Scottish League Cup group stages. Lets’osa scored his first league goal for Thistle in October 2025, in a 2–1 home win over Ayr United.

== International career ==
Lets'osa represented Scotland at youth international level, having featured for the under-16 national team at the 2019 Victory Shield, where they finished as joint winners, together with Wales. In August 2025, he was called up to the Scotland U21 squad.

== Personal life ==
Lets'osa was born in Lesotho, before moving to Scotland with his family. He is a Christian.

== Honours ==
Celtic B

- Glasgow Cup: 2022–23

Scotland U16

- Victory Shield: 2019
