= Ricco Diack =

Scottish footballer (born 2005)

Personal information
- Full name: Ricco Diack
- Date of birth: 7 May 2005 (age 21)
- Place of birth: Glasgow, Scotland
- Height: 1.90 m (6 ft 3 in)
- Position: Striker

Team information
- Current team: Ross County (on loan from Partick Thistle)

Youth career
- 2008–2021: Rangers
- 2022–2023: Partick Thistle

Senior career*
Years	Team	Apps	(Gls)
2021–2022	Rossvale		
2023–	Partick Thistle	32	(3)
2025	→ Airdrieonians (loan)	15	(3)
2025	→ Kelty Hearts (loan)	14	(6)
2026–	→ Ross County (loan)	12	(2)
- * Club domestic league appearances and goals as of 18:41, 21 November 2026 (UTC)

Ricco Diack (born 7 May 2005) is a Scottish professional footballer who plays as a striker for Scottish League One club Ross County on loan from Partick Thistle.

== Career ==
=== Partick Thistle ===
Diack made his Partick Thistle debut coming off the bench in a Scottish Championship game against Hamilton Academical in January 2023.

Diack signed a two-year deal as a modern apprentice with Thistle in July 2023.

Diack made his first professional start in a Scottish Championship game against Airdrieonians, also scoring his first professional goal after just seven minutes, in a 2–1 home victory. Following this performance, Diack was named in the SPFL team of the week. Diack scored once again, scoring the equaliser in a 1–1 away draw with Greenock Morton. Diack scored his third goal of the season in a 4–0 home victory over Airdrie.

Diack scored his first goal of the 2024–25 season in a 6–0 away win over Edinburgh City FC in the Scottish League Cup.

Diack was involved in a referee admin error during the final game of the Scottish League Cup group stages in a 0–0 draw away to Motherwell, in which Thistle manager Kris Doolan attempted to substitute the striker on, but was denied the substitution, due to an admin error in which the matchday referee had accidentally cropped Diack's name out of Thistle's matchday squad, meaning he was not eligible to play, despite the club submitting his name. This incident became a source of controversy in the media over officials handling of confirming matchday squads.

After returning to Thistle from his loan at Kelty, Diack scored his first goal for Thistle in 2026 in a 3–1 win over Montrose in the Scottish Cup.

==== Airdrieonians (loan) ====
On the 14th of January 2025 Diack joined fellow Scottish Championship side Airdrieonians on loan until the end of the season.

Diack scored his first goal for Airdrie in a 2–2 away draw with Greenock Morton. Diack scored the first double of his career in a 5–0 away win against Queen’s Park.

==== Kelty Hearts (loan) ====
In September 2025, Diack joined Scottish League One club Kelty Hearts on loan until January 2026. Diack scored his first goal for Kelty, opening the scoring with a free kick, in a 2-1 defeat to Peterhead in Scottish League One.

==== Ross County (loan) ====
In August 2026, Diack joined Scottish League One club Ross County on a loan until January 2027.

Diack scored the first hat-trick of his career in a 14–0 win over Heart of Midlothian B, in the KDM Evolution Trophy league stage.

== Personal life ==
Diack is the son of former footballer Iain Diack who was also a former striker in the SPFL, currently Managing Scottish side Sauchie Juniors.
