= Luke McBeth =

Scottish professional footballer

Personal information
- Date of birth: 9 September 1999 (age 27)
- Place of birth: Glasgow, Scotland
- Height: 1.93 m (6 ft 4 in)
- Positions: Centre back; defensive midfielder

Team information
- Current team: Ayr United

Youth career
- St Cadocs Youth Club

College career
Years	Team	Apps	(Gls)
2018-2020	Lindenwood University	33	(12)
2020–2022	Monmouth University	39	(5)

Senior career*
Years	Team	Apps	(Gls)
2023	East Kilbride	3	(0)
2023	Glenafton Athletic	18	(3)
2024–2026	Partick Thistle	79	(2)
2026–	Ayr United	13	(3)
- * Club domestic league appearances and goals as of 23:10, 7 November 2026 (UTC)

Luke McBeth (born 9 September 1999) is a Scottish professional footballer who plays as a centre back or defensive midfielder for Scottish Championship club Ayr United. Born in Glasgow, McBeth developed his game in the US College system before returning to Scotland for his professional playing career.

== Career ==
=== College career ===
Following coming through the youth ranks at St Cadocs Youth Club in Glasgow's Southside, McBeth continued his footballing career in the US college football scholarship system. Between 2018 and 2022 he played for two universities during his time in the US, Lindenwood University in Missouri and Monmouth University in New Jersey.

=== Return to Scotland ===
After leaving the US, McBeth signed for Scottish Lowland Football League side East Kilbride in late 2022. Following a short spell with East Kilbride, McBeth moved to West of Scotland Football League club Glenafton Athletic in 2023.

=== Partick Thistle ===
On 1 January 2024, following a successful trial period, McBeth signed for Scottish Championship club Partick Thistle for an undisclosed fee, signing an 18-month contract, with the option of a further year, with the Glasgow club.

McBeth made his Thistle debut, coming off the bench as a substitute in a 3–2 home victory over Queen's Park in the Scottish Championship in January 2024.

McBeth made his first start for Thistle, playing the full 90 minutes in a 3–3 away draw with Inverness in February 2024.

McBeth scored his first goal for Thistle in the first leg of the Scottish Premiership play off quarter final against Airdrie in May 2024, curling in a stunning strike from over 25 yards.

McBeth signed a contract extension with Partick Thistle in May 2024, adding an extra two years to his deal, extending it until summer 2027.

McBeth scored his first league goal for Thistle with a volley, in a 2–0 home win over Ayr United in March 2025.

=== Ayr United ===
In June 2026, Luke McBeth joined fellow Championship side Ayr United for an undisclosed fee, with Partick Thistle manager Mark Wilson citing McBeth's desire for more regular playing time as the reason for the move.
