= Zander MacKenzie =

Scottish footballer

Personal information
- Date of birth: 28 August 2005 (age 21)
- Place of birth: Lochgilphead, Scotland
- Positions: Central midfielder; right back; left back

Team information
- Current team: Queen of the South
- Number: 8

Youth career
- Lochgilphead Red Star
- Partick Thistle

Senior career*
Years	Team	Apps	(Gls)
2022–2026	Partick Thistle	38	(1)
2022	→ Petershill (loan)		
2025–2026	→ Queen of the South (loan)	25	(0)
2026–	Queen of the South	15	(1)

International career^{‡}
2023–	Scotland U19	3	(0)
- * Club domestic league appearances and goals as of 08:47, 17 November 2026 (UTC) ‡ National team caps and goals as of 23:46, 23 December 2023 (UTC)

Zander MacKenzie (born 28 August 2005) is a Scottish professional footballer who plays as a midfielder or full back for Scottish League One club Queen of the South.

== Career ==
=== Partick Thistle ===
Aged 16 MacKenzie graduated from the Thistle Weir youth academy and joined the club's first team on a two-year contract, as a modern apprentice.

MacKenzie made his first team debut for Thistle in September 2022, in the Scottish Challenge Cup, coming off the bench away to Falkirk. MacKenzie made his first league appearance for Thistle as a substitute in a 3-2 home defeat to Dundee, in November 2022.

MacKenzie provided the first assist of his career in a 5-0 away win over Cove Rangers.

Following a breakthrough into the first team, MacKenzie signed a three-year contract extension with Partick Thistle in July 2023.

MacKenzie scored his first goal for Partick Thistle adding the third in a 3–0 home win over Queen's Park in the Scottish Championship in August 2024.

==== Loan to Queen of the South ====
In September 2025, MacKenzie joined Scottish League One club Queen of the South on loan until January 2026. In January 2026 MacKenzie’s loan with Queen of the South was extended until the end of the season.

=== Queen of the South ===
Following the end of his contract at Partick Thistle at the culmination of the 2025-26 season, it was announced that MacKenzie had signed for Queen of the South for the 2026-27 season.
