= Ben McPherson (Scottish footballer) =

Scottish footballer (born 2004)

Personal information
- Date of birth: 19 March 2004 (age 22)
- Height: 1.81 m (5 ft 11 in)
- Position: Right-back

Team information
- Current team: Partick Thistle
- Number: 24

Youth career
- Celtic

Senior career*
Years	Team	Apps	(Gls)
2023–2026	Celtic B	24	(1)
2023–2024	→ Queen's Park (loan)	24	(0)
2025–2026	→ Partick Thistle (loan)	31	(2)
2026–	Partick Thistle	12	(0)

International career^{‡}
2019	Scotland U16	1	(0)
2022	Scotland U19	4	(0)
2023-	Scotland U21	9	(0)
- * Club domestic league appearances and goals as of 18:38, 21 November 2026 (UTC) ‡ National team caps and goals as of 22:42, 15 November 2025 (UTC)

Ben McPherson (born 19 March 2004) is a Scottish professional footballer who plays as a defender for Partick Thistle.

== Club career ==
=== Celtic ===
McPherson has been a part of Celtic's B team since coming through the club's youth academy.

McPherson extended his Celtic deal in December 2022.

==== Queen's Park (loan) ====
McPherson joined Scottish Championship side Queen's Park on a season long loan in August 2023. McPherson made his Queen's Park debut in a 2–1 home win over Arbroath.

==== Partick Thistle (loan) ====
In August 2025, McPherson joined Scottish Championship club Partick Thistle on a season long loan.

McPherson scored his first goal for Thistle, opening the scoring in a 2–0 away win against Raith Rovers.

McPherson, alongside fellow Celtic loanee Josh Clarke, agreed to sign for Partick Thistle on a permanent basis in February 2026.
