= Lewis Budinauckas =

Scottish footballer

Personal information
- Date of birth: 19 June 2002 (age 24)
- Position: Goalkeeper

Team information
- Current team: Partick Thistle
- Number: 1

Senior career*
Years	Team	Apps	(Gls)
2020–2025	Rangers	0	(0)
2020–2021	→ Civil Service Strollers (loan)		
2021–2022	→ Raith Rovers (loan)	0	(0)
2023–2024	→ Stranraer (loan)	29	(0)
2024	→ Greenock Morton (loan)	4	(0)
2025	→ Partick Thistle (loan)	8	(0)
2025–	Partick Thistle	8	(0)

International career
2024	Scotland U21	2	(0)
- * Club domestic league appearances and goals as of 18:28, 21 November 2026 (UTC)

Lewis Budinauckas (born 19 June 2002) is a Scottish footballer who plays as a goalkeeper for Scottish Championship club Partick Thistle.

== Career ==
=== Rangers ===
Budinauckas signed a professional deal with Scottish Premiership club Rangers after coming through the clubs youth ranks. Initially joining up with the Rangers B side.

==== Loan spells ====
Bundinauckas has had numerous loan spells away from Rangers. Initially joining Civil Service Strollers, before joining Scottish Championship side Raith Rovers on an emergency loan in 2022.

In 2024 Bundinauckas joined Scottish Championship side Greenock Morton on an emergency loan.

In February 2025 Bundinauckas followed in his father Kevin’s footsteps as he joined Scottish Championship club Partick Thistle on loan until the end of the season.

=== Partick Thistle ===
Following his loan spell with the club, Budinauckas joined Partick Thistle permanently in June 2025, on a one year deal, with an option for a further year.

In June 2026, Budinauckas signed a new two year contract extension with Thistle, extending his deal until summer 2028.
