= 2018–19 Partick Thistle F.C. season =

Partick Thistle
2018–19 season
- Manager: Alan Archibald (until 6 October); Gary Caldwell (from 15 October)
- Stadium: Firhill Stadium
- Championship: Sixth place
- Scottish Cup: Quarter-finals
- League Cup: Second round
- Challenge Cup: Second round
- Top goalscorer: League: Blair Spittal (7); All: Blair Spittal (8)
- Highest home attendance: 6,517 vs. Dundee United, Championship, 28 February 2019
- Lowest home attendance: 1,879 vs. St Mirren, League Cup, 23 September 2018
- Average home league attendance: 3,042
Home colours	Away colours

The 2018–19 season was Partick Thistle's first season back in the Scottish Championship, following their relegation from the Scottish Premiership at the end of the 2017–18 season. Thistle also competed in the League Cup, Challenge Cup and the Scottish Cup.

== Summary ==
=== Management ===
Partick Thistle began the season under the management of Alan Archibald who been in charge since February 2013. On 6 October, following a poor start to the season, Archibald left his position as manager and was replaced by Gary Caldwell who was appointed on 15 October.

== Results and fixtures ==
Win Draw Loss Postponed

=== Pre Season ===
8 July 2018	Heart of Midlothian	3–1	Partick Thistle	Central Park, Cowdenbeath
14:00	Garuccio 2'; Lee 47', 76'	Report	O'Ware 38'

=== Scottish Championship ===
4 August 2018 1	Ayr United	2–0	Partick Thistle	Somerset Park, Ayr
15:00	Shankland 7' (pen.), 18'	Report		Attendance: 3,249; Referee: Craig Thomson

11 August 2018 2	Partick Thistle	2–1	Falkirk	Firhill Stadium, Glasgow
15:00	Penrice 24'; Erskine 28'	Report	Greenwood 90+1'	Attendance: 3,417; Referee: Kevin Clancy

17 August 2018 3	Dundee United	3–1	Partick Thistle	Tannadice Park, Dundee
15:00	Watson 6', 78'; Curran 86'	Report	Erskine 90+2'	Attendance: 5,219; Referee: David Munro

1 September 2018 4	Partick Thistle	1–0	Greenock Morton	Firhill Stadium, Glasgow
15:00	Erskine 50'	Report		Attendance: 3,431; Referee: Barry Cook

15 September 2018 5	Inverness CT	3–2	Partick Thistle	Caledonian Stadium, Inverness
15:00	White 11'; Rooney 23'; Welsh 32' (pen.)	Report	Spittal 82'; Doolan 90+3'	Attendance: 2,424; Referee: Greg Aitken

22 September 2018 6	Partick Thistle	3–2	Queen of the South	Firhill Stadium, Glasgow
15:00	Doolan 32'; Spittal 38', 41'	Report	Dobbie 4'; Todd 34'	Attendance: 2,710; Referee: John Beaton

28 September 2018 7	Dunfermline Athletic	1–0	Partick Thistle	East End Park, Dunfermline
19:45	Connolly 69'	Report		Attendance: 4,740; Referee: Kevin Clancy

6 October 2018 8	Partick Thistle	0–2	Ross County	Firhill Stadium, Glasgow
15:00		Report	Mullin 14'; McKay 56' (pen.); Draper (red card) 90+1'	Attendance: 2,784; Referee: Nick Walsh

13 October 2018 9	Partick Thistle	1–2	Dundee United	Firhill Stadium, Glasgow
15:00	Quitongo 77'	Report	Aird 45'; Šafranko 48'	Attendance: 3,087; Referee: Willie Collum

20 October 2018 10	Alloa Athletic	1–0	Partick Thistle	Recreation Park, Alloa
15:00	Zanatta 50'	Report		Attendance: 1,392; Referee: Alan Muir

27 October 2018 11	Partick Thistle	0–1	Ayr United	Firhill Stadium, Glasgow
15:00		Report	Rose 77'	Attendance: 3,491; Referee: Bobby Madden

3 November 2018 12	Greenock Morton	5–1	Partick Thistle	Cappielow, Greenock
15:00	Oliver 23'; McHugh 43', 66'; Iredale 54'; Tidser 71'	Report	Ntambwe 16'	Attendance: 2,197; Referee: Steven McLean

10 November 2018 13	Partick Thistle	0–1	Inverness CT	Firhill Stadium, Glasgow
15:00		Report	Walsh 71'	Attendance: 2,509; Referee: Bobby Madden

17 November 2018 14	Falkirk	1–1	Partick Thistle	Falkirk Stadium, Falkirk
15:00	Slater 57'	Report	McKee 59'	Attendance: 4,589; Referee: Craig Thomson

1 December 2018 15	Queen of the South	1–0	Partick Thistle	Palmerston Park, Dumfries
15:00	Dobbie 82'	Report		Attendance: 1,508; Referee: Steven McLean

8 December 2018 16	Partick Thistle	2–0	Dunfermline Athletic	Firhill Stadium, Glasgow
15:00	Spittal 12'; Storey 56'	Report		Attendance: 2,566; Referee: Kevin Clancy

15 December 2018 17	Partick Thistle	2–2	Alloa Athletic	Firhill Stadium, Glasgow
15:00	Doolan 18' (pen.); Spittal 37'	Report	Cawley 24'; Zanatta 59'	Attendance: 1,990; Referee: Alan Newlands

22 December 2018 18	Ross County	2–0	Partick Thistle	Victoria Park, Dingwall
15:00	McKay 26' (pen.); Stewart 79'	Report		Attendance: 3,467; Referee: Colin Steven

29 December 2018 19	Partick Thistle	1–2	Greenock Morton	Firhill Stadium, Glasgow
15:00	Slater 60'	Report	Tiffoney 9'; Telfer 80'	Attendance: 3,074; Referee: Euan Anderson

5 January 2019 20	Dundee United	1–1	Partick Thistle	Tannadice Park, Dundee
15:00	Fyvie 62' (pen.)	Report	Doolan 9'	Attendance: 5,282; Referee: Bobby Madden

12 January 2019 21	Partick Thistle	1–1	Falkirk	Firhill Stadium, Glasgow
15:00	Spittal 61'; Harkins (red card) 74'	Report	Rudden 76'	Attendance: 4,438; Referee: Andrew Dallas

26 January 2019 22	Partick Thistle	2–1	Queen of the South	Firhill Stadium, Glasgow
15:00	Cardle 18'; Storey 54'	Report	Dobbie 80' (pen.)	Attendance: 2,662; Referee: Colin Steven

2 February 2019 23	Inverness CT	1–2	Partick Thistle	Caledonian Stadium, Inverness
15:00	McCauley 77'	Report	Anderson 21'; Fitzpatrick 77'	Attendance: 2,171; Referee: David Lowe

16 February 2019 24	Alloa Athletic	0–2	Partick Thistle	Recreation Park, Alloa
15:00		Report	Spittal 4'; McDonald 79'	Attendance: 1,757; Referee: Gavin Ross

23 February 2019 25	Partick Thistle	2–4	Ross County	Firhill Stadium, Glasgow
15:00	Elliott 24'; Fitzpatrick 41'	Report	Stewart 47', 74'; Lindsay 64'; McKay 79' (pen.)	Attendance: 3,007; Referee: Gavin Duncan

26 February 2019 26	Dunfermline Athletic	3–0	Partick Thistle	East End Park, Dunfermline
15:00	Anderson 47', 86'; Devine 74'	Report		Attendance: 4,904; Referee: Greg Aitken

9 March 2019 27	Partick Thistle	2–1	Dundee United	Firhill Stadium, Glasgow
15:00	McDonald 4'; Fitzpatrick 90'	Report	Clark 76'	Attendance: 3,173; Referee: Alan Newlands

16 March 2019 28	Falkirk	1–1	Partick Thistle	Falkirk Stadium, Falkirk
15:00	McShane 45'	Report	McDonald 10'	Attendance: 4,896; Referee: Mike Roncone

22 March 2019 29	Partick Thistle	1–2	Inverness CT	Firhill Stadium, Glasgow
19:45	Bannigan 68'	Report	Doran 65'; Walsh 81'	Attendance: 2,149; Referee: John Beaton

30 March 2019 30	Greenock Morton	0–3	Partick Thistle	Cappielow, Greenock
15:00		Report	Doolan 17', 43'; Anderson 36'	Attendance: 2,329; Referee: John Beaton

6 April 2019 31	Partick Thistle	2–2	Dunfermline Athletic	Firhill Stadium, Glasgow
15:00	Blair 31' (o.g.); McDonald 77'	Report	Beadling 10'; Anderson 24'	Attendance: 2,850; Referee: Kevin Clancy

13 April 2019 32	Ross County	0–0	Partick Thistle	Victoria Park, Dingwall
15:00		Report		Attendance: 4,031; Referee: Gavin Duncan

20 April 2019 33	Partick Thistle	2–1	Alloa Athletic	Firhill Stadium, Glasgow
15:00	Cardle 47'; McDonald 86'	Report	Aitchison 13'	Attendance: 3,578; Referee: David Munro

23 April 2019 34	Ayr United	0–1	Partick Thistle	Somerset Park, Ayr
19:45		Report	Gordon 17'	Attendance: 2,429; Referee: Alan Newlands

27 April 2019 35	Partick Thistle	1–2	Ayr United	Firhill Stadium, Glasgow
15:00	Gordon 9'	Report	Smith 30'; Muirhead 56'	Attendance: 3,855; Referee: Nick Walsh

4 May 2019 36	Queen of the South	0–3	Partick Thistle	Palmerston Park, Dumfries
15:00		Report	Mansell 14'; McDonald 44'; Bannigan 73' (pen.)	Attendance: 3,916; Referee: Andrew Dallas

=== Scottish League Cup ===
==== Group stage ====
Results

14 July 2018 Group stage	Stenhousemuir	0–2	Partick Thistle	Ochilview Park, Stenhousemuir
15:00		Report	Gordon 2', 6'	Attendance: 675; Referee: Gavin Duncan

17 July 2018 Group stage	Partick Thistle	2–1	Greenock Morton	Firhill Stadium, Glasgow
19:45	Storer 17'; Penrice 29'	Report	Tumilty 74'	Attendance: 2,088; Referee: Kevin Clancy

21 July 2018 Group stage	Albion Rovers	0–2	Partick Thistle	Cliftonhill, Coatbridge
15:00		Report	Storey 59'; Fitzpatrick 83'	Attendance: 963; Referee: David Lowe

28 July 2018 Group stage	Partick Thistle	0–2	Ayr United	Firhill Stadium, Glasgow
15:00		Report	Moffat 6'; Shankland 66'	Attendance: 2,871; Referee: Nick Walsh

=== Scottish Challenge Cup ===
14 August 2018 First round	Stranraer	0–5	Partick Thistle	Stair Park, Stranraer
19:45		Report	O'Ware 10'; Fitzpatrick 34', 90+2'; Mbuyi-Mutombo 36'; Melbourne 89'	Attendance: 480; Referee: Alan Newlands

8 September 2018 Second round	East Fife	2–1	Partick Thistle	Bayview Stadium, Methil
15:00	Agnew 51'; Currie 74'	Report	Mbuyi-Mutombo 22'	Attendance: 932; Referee: Alan Muir

=== Scottish Cup ===
19 January 2019 Fourth round	Partick Thistle	4–1	Stranraer	Firhill Stadium, Glasgow
15:00	Fitzpatrick 17'; Cardle 50'; Saunders 74'; Spittal 81'	Report	Crossan 52'	Attendance: 2,254; Referee: Alan Newlands

19 January 2019 Fifth round	East Fife	0–1	Partick Thistle	Bayview Stadium, Methil
15:00		Report	Anderson 61'	Attendance: 1,724; Referee: Don Robertson

4 March 2019 Quarter–Final	Partick Thistle	1–1	Heart of Midlothian	Firhill Stadium, Glasgow
15:00	Elliott 72'	Report	Berra 12'	Attendance: 5,171; Referee: Bobby Madden

12 March 2019 Quarter–Final Replay	Heart of Midlothian	2–1	Partick Thistle	Tynecastle Park, Edinburgh
15:00	Ikpeazu 24'; Clare 35' (pen.)	Report	McDonald 17'	Attendance: 10,351; Referee: Bobby Madden

== Player statistics ==
As of 4 May 2019 (UTC)

No.	Pos	Nat	Player	Total		Championship		League Cup		Scottish Cup		Other	
No.	Pos	Nat	Player	Apps	Goals	Apps	Goals	Apps	Goals	Apps	Goals	Apps	Goals
2	DF	(England) ENG	Christie Elliott	44	2	33+0	1	5+0	0	4+0	1	2+0	0
3	DF	(Scotland) SCO	James Penrice	47	2	36+0	1	5+0	1	4+0	0	2+0	0
4	MF	(Scotland) SCO	Thomas O'Ware	8	4	3+0	3	4+0	0	0+0	0	1+0	1
5	DF	(Scotland) SCO	Steven Anderson	16	3	13+0	2	0+0	0	3+0	1	0+0	0
6	DF	(Republic of Ireland) IRL	Sean McGinty	36	0	28+0	0	5+0	0	1+1	0	1+0	0
7	MF	(Scotland) SCO	Blair Spittal	47	8	33+3	7	5+0	0	3+1	1	0+2	0
8	MF	(Scotland) SCO	Stuart Bannigan	31	2	26+2	2	0+0	0	3+0	0	0+0	0
9	FW	(Scotland) SCO	Kris Doolan	39	6	24+6	6	5+0	0	0+2	0	2+0	0
10	FW	(Australia) AUS	Scott McDonald	13	7	10+2	6	0+0	0	1+0	1	0+0	0
11	MF	(Scotland) SCO	Gary Harkins	16	0	8+5	0	2+1	0	0+0	0	0+0	0
14	MF	(Northern Ireland) NIR	Shea Gordon	14	4	9+0	2	5+0	2	0+0	0	0+0	0
15	GK	(Northern Ireland) NIR	Conor Hazard	15	0	11+0	0	0+0	0	4+0	0	0+0	0
16	MF	(Scotland) SCO	Andrew McCarthy	11	0	1+6	0	0+4	0	0+0	0	0+0	0
17	MF	(Scotland) SCO	Craig Slater	41	2	27+3	2	4+1	0	4+0	0	2+0	0
19	FW	(England) ENG	Miles Storey	37	3	23+7	2	2+2	1	1+2	0	0+0	0
20	MF	(Scotland) SCO	Callum Wilson	3	0	0+2	0	0+0	0	0+0	0	0+1	0
21	MF	(Scotland) SCO	Aidan Fitzpatrick	30	7	8+13	3	0+3	1	3+1	1	2+0	2
23	GK	(Scotland) SCO	Jamie Sneddon	16	0	13+0	0	0+1	0	0+0	0	2+0	0
29	FW	(Ivory Coast) CIV	Souleymane Coulibaly	4	0	0+3	0	0+0	0	0+1	0	0+0	0
30	FW	(England) ENG	Lewis Mansell	11	1	3+5	1	2+1	0	0+0	0	0+0	0
31	DF	(Scotland) SCO	Jack McMillan	16	0	13+0	0	0+0	0	3+0	0	0+0	0
32	MF	(England) ENG	Joe Cardle	14	3	5+6	2	0+0	0	1+2	1	0+0	0
43	DF	(Scotland) SCO	Steven Saunders	17	0	9+3	0	0+0	0	4+1	0	0+0	0
99	FW	(Scotland) SCO	Ally Roy	5	0	0+4	0	0+0	0	1+0	0	0+0	0
Players who left the club during the 2018–19 season
1	GK	(Scotland) SCO	Cammy Bell	16	0	12+0	0	4+0	0	0+0	0	0+0	0
5	DF	(Republic of Ireland) IRL	Niall Keown	16	0	13+1	0	1+0	0	0+0	0	1+0	0
10	MF	(Scotland) SCO	Chris Erskine	24	3	9+9	3	3+1	0	0+0	0	0+2	0
11	MF	(England) ENG	Jack Storer	11	0	2+2	0	4+1	0	0+0	0	2+0	0
12	GK	(Australia) AUS	Aaron Lennox	1	0	0+0	0	1+0	0	0+0	0	0+0	0
15	DF	(England) ENG	Max Melbourne	5	1	2+1	0	1+0	0	0+0	0	1+0	1
18	FW	(Democratic Republic of the Congo) COD	Andréa Mbuyi-Mutombo	12	3	4+5	0	1+0	1	0+0	0	2+0	2
30	DF	(Wales) WAL	Daniel Jefferies	4	0	3+1	0	0+0	0	0+0	0	0+0	0
33	FW	(Scotland) SCO	Jai Quitongo	13	1	4+9	1	0+0	0	0+0	0	0+0	0
37	DF	(Scotland) SCO	Tam Scobbie	8	0	6+1	0	0+0	0	0+0	0	1+0	0
39	MF	(Belgium) BEL	Brice Ntambwe	6	1	4+1	1	0+0	0	0+0	0	1+0	0

== Club statistics ==
=== League table ===
Pos	Team	Pld	W	D	L	GF	GA	GD	Pts	Promotion, qualification or relegation
4	Ayr United	36	15	9	12	50	38	+12	54	Qualification for the Premiership play-off quarter-final
5	Greenock Morton	36	11	13	12	36	45	−9	46	
6	Partick Thistle	36	12	7	17	43	52	−9	43	
7	Dunfermline Athletic	36	11	8	17	33	40	−7	41	
8	Alloa Athletic	36	10	9	17	39	53	−14	39	

Source: SPFL
Rules for classification: 1) Points; 2) Goal difference; 3) Goals scored; 4) Points in head-to-head matches; 5) Goal difference in hth matches; 6). Goals scored in hth matches; 7). Play-off (only for deciding promotion, play-off participation and relegation).

=== League Cup table ===
Pos	Team	Pld	W	PW	PL	L	GF	GA	GD	Pts	Qualification	AYR	PAR	GMO	STE	ALB
1	Ayr United (Q)	4	4	0	0	0	12	1	+11	12	Qualification for the Second round	—	—	3–1	5–0	—
2	Partick Thistle (Q)	4	3	0	0	1	6	3	+3	9	Qualification for the Second round	0–2	—	2–1	—	—
3	Greenock Morton	4	2	0	0	2	9	5	+4	6		—	—	—	2–0	5–0
4	Stenhousemuir	4	1	0	0	3	4	9	−5	3		—	0–2	—	—	4–0
5	Albion Rovers	4	0	0	0	4	0	13	−13	0		0–2	0–2	—	—	—

Rules for classification: 1) goal difference, 2) goals scored, 3) away goals scored, 4) matches won, 5) away matches won, 6) drawing of lots.
(Q) Qualified to the phase indicated

=== Division summary ===
Round	1	2	3	4	5	6	7	8	9	10	11	12	13	14	15	16	17	18	19	20	21	22	23	24	25	26	27	28	29	30	31	32	33	34	35	36
Ground	A	H	A	H	A	H	A	H	H	A	H	A	H	A	A	H	H	A	H	A	H	H	A	A	H	A	H	A	H	A	H	A	H	A	H	A
Result	L	W	L	W	L	W	L	L	L	L	L	L	L	D	L	W	D	L	L	D	D	W	W	W	L	L	W	D	L	W	D	D	W	W	L	W
Position	10	7	7	7	7	6	7	8	8	8	8	8	9	9	10	8	8	9	9	10	10	9	9	8	10	10	10	9	9	9	9	10	9	6	7	6

Updated to match(es) played on 4 May 2019. Source:
A = Away; H = Home; W = Win; D = Draw; L = Loss

== Transfers ==
=== In ===
Date	Position	Nationality	Name	From	Fee
2 June 2018	DF	(Scotland)	Thomas O'Ware	Greenock Morton	Free
18 June 2018	DF	(Republic of Ireland)	Sean McGinty	Torquay United	Free
23 June 2018	GK	(Australia)	Aaron Lennox	Raith Rovers	Free
1 July 2018	GK	(Scotland)	Cammy Bell	Hibernian	Free
2 July 2018	FW	(England)	Jack Storer	Birmingham City	Free
4 July 2018	MF	(Scotland)	Craig Slater	Colchester United	Free
12 August 2018	FW	(Democratic Republic of the Congo)	Andréa Mbuyi-Mutombo	RNK Split	Free
12 August 2018	FW	(Ivory Coast)	Souleymane Coulibaly	Al Ahly	Free
22 August 2018	MF	(Belgium)	Brice Ntambwe	Lierse	Free
31 August 2018	FW	(Scotland)	Jai Quitongo	Greenock Morton	Compensation
27 December 2018	MF	(Scotland)	Gary Harkins	Queen of the South	Free
3 January 2019	DF	(Scotland)	Steven Saunders	Livingston	Free
4 January 2019	MF	(England)	Joe Cardle	AFC Fylde	Free
4 January 2019	FW	(Scotland)	Ally Roy	Derry City	Free
15 February 2019	FW	(Australia)	Scott McDonald	Dundee United	Free

=== Out ===
Date	Position	Nationality	Name	To	Fee
28 May 2018	DF	(Scotland)	Paul McGinn	St Mirren	Free
30 May 2018	DF	(Scotland)	Callum Booth	Dundee United	Free
6 June 2018	MF	(Australia)	Ryan Edwards	Heart of Midlothian	Free
6 June 2018	DF	(Northern Ireland)	Danny Devine	Dunfermline Athletic	Free
10 June 2018	MF	(Scotland)	Mark Lamont	Clyde	Free
6 June 2018	MF	(Scotland)	Gary Fraser	Forfar Athletic	Free
21 June 2018	GK	(Republic of Ireland)	Ryan Scully	Greenock Morton	Free
10 July 2018	FW	(Scotland)	Neil McLaughlin	Motherwell	Free
11 July 2018	FW	(Scotland)	Kevin Nisbet	Raith Rovers	Free
14 July 2018	MF	(Republic of Ireland)	Adam Barton	Dundee United	Free
25 July 2018	GK	(Czech Republic)	Tomáš Černý	Aberdeen	Free
2 August 2018	MF	(Scotland)	Steven Lawless	Livingston	Free
17 August 2018	MF	(Ghana)	Abdul Osman	Lamia	Free
19 November 2018	DF	(Sierra Leone)	Mustapha Dumbuya	Falkirk	Free
9 January 2019	MF	(Belgium)	Brice Ntambwe	Macclesfield Town	Free
15 January 2019	MF	(Scotland)	Chris Erskine	Livingston	Undisclosed
29 January 2019	FW	(Democratic Republic of the Congo)	Andréa Mbuyi-Mutombo	Stade Lausanne Ouchy	Free

=== Loans in ===
Date from	Date to	Position	Nationality	Name	From
2 July 2018	End of season	MF	(Northern Ireland)	Shea Gordon	Motherwell
26 July 2018	1 January 2019	DF	(England)	Max Melbourne	West Bromwich Albion
31 August 2018	1 January 2019	DF	(Scotland)	Tam Scobbie	Dundee United
31 August 2018	1 January 2019	DF	(Wales)	Daniel Jefferies	Dundee
3 January 2019	End of season	GK	(Northern Ireland)	Conor Hazard	Celtic
17 January 2019	End of season	FW	(England)	Lewis Mansell	Blackburn Rovers
21 January 2019	End of season	DF	(Scotland)	Jack McMillan	Livingston
29 January 2019	End of season	DF	(Scotland)	Steven Anderson	St Johnstone

=== Loans out ===
Date from	Date to	Position	Nationality	Name	To
29 January 2019	End of season	DF	(Republic of Ireland)	Niall Keown	St Johnstone
31 January 2019	End of season	GK	(Scotland)	Cammy Bell	St Johnstone
31 January 2019	End of season	GK	(Australia)	Aaron Lennox	Cowdenbeath

== See also ==
- List of Partick Thistle F.C. seasons
