= 2023–24 Partick Thistle F.C. season =

Partick Thistle
2023–24 season
- Chairman: Alistair Creevy
- Manager: Kris Doolan
- Stadium: Firhill Stadium
- Scottish Championship: 3rd
- Premiership play-offs: Semi-finals
- Scottish Cup: Fifth round
- League Cup: Second round
- Challenge Cup: Third round
- Glasgow Cup: Group stage
- Top goalscorer: League: Brian Graham (20); All: Brian Graham (26)
- Highest home attendance: 6,531, vs. Airdrieonians, Play-offs, 10 May 2024
- Lowest home attendance: 2,231, vs. The Spartans, League Cup, 29 July 2023
- Average home league attendance: 3,517
Home colours	Away colours

The 2023–24 season was Partick Thistle's third season back in the Scottish Championship, having been promoted from League One at the end of the 2020–21 season. Thistle also competed in the League Cup, Challenge Cup, Scottish Cup and Glasgow Cup.

== Results and fixtures ==
Win Draw Loss Postponed

=== Pre-season ===
4 July 2023	Kelty Hearts	1–2	Partick Thistle	Kelty
19:45	Johnston 61'		Graham 32'; Trialist 82'	Stadium: New Central Park

=== Scottish Championship ===
5 August 2023 1	Partick Thistle	2–2	Raith Rovers	Firhill Stadium
15:00	McMillan 5'; Fitzpatrick 45'	Report	Easton 83'; Mitchell 89'	Attendance: 3,468; Referee: Calum Scott

12 August 2023 2	Airdrieonians	2–1	Partick Thistle	Excelsior Stadium
15:00	McGill 63'; Gallagher 71'	Report	Lyon 31'	Attendance: 2,691; Referee: Craig Napier

26 August 2023 3	Partick Thistle	3–1	Queen's Park	Firhill Stadium
15:00	McInroy 26', 57'; Graham 30'	Report	Paton 32'	Attendance: 3,365; Referee: Grant Irvine

2 September 2023 4	Greenock Morton	1–4	Partick Thistle	Excelsior Stadium
15:00	Muirhead 15'	Report	Lawless 39'; Graham 70', 72'; Milne (red card) 77'; Adeloye 84'	Attendance: 2,726; Referee: Graham Grainger

15 September 2023 5	Ayr United	0–4	Partick Thistle	Somerset Park
19:45		Report	Graham 2'; Lawless 58', 67'; Adeloye 81'	Attendance: 2,078; Referee: William Collum

23 September 2023 6	Partick Thistle	0–3	Arbroath	Firhill Stadium
15:00		Report	Hylton 12', 80'; O'Brien 39'	Attendance: 3,159; Referee: Graham Grainger

30 September 2023 7	Partick Thistle	3–0	Dunfermline Athletic	Firhill Stadium
15:00	Robinson 21'; Graham 49'; McInroy 60'	Report		Attendance: 3,703; Referee: Colin Steven

7 October 2023 8	Inverness CT	0–0	Partick Thistle	Caledonian Stadium
15:00		Report		Attendance: 2,364; Referee: Dan McFarlane

21 October 2023 9	Partick Thistle	0–5	Dundee United	Firhill Stadium
15:00	Muirhead (red card) 80'	Report	Sibbald 12'; Holt 61', 83', 88 pen.' McMann 63'	Attendance: 5,120; Referee: Steven Kirkland

27 October 2023 10	Queen's Park	2–2	Partick Thistle	Hampden Park
19:45	Paton 52 pen.' Turner 56'	Report	Lawless 45+2 pen.' Adeloye 58'	Attendance: 2,894; Referee: Chris Graham

31 October 2023 11	Partick Thistle	2–2	Ayr United	Firhill Stadium
19:45	Graham 17'; Milne 47'	Report	Murphy 19', 75 pen.'	Attendance: 2,428; Referee: Ross Hardie

3 November 2023 12	Arbroath	1–3	Partick Thistle	Gayfield Park
15:00	Hylton 87'	Report	Fitzpatrick 23', 61'; Graham 74'	Attendance: 1,753; Referee: Gavin Duncan

11 November 2023 13	Partick Thistle	2–1	Greenock Morton	Firhill Stadium
15:00	McInroy 3'; Graham (red card) 74'; Alston 77'	Report	Gillespie 32 pen.'	Attendance: 3,732; Referee: Alan Muir

2 December 2023 14	Partick Thistle	2–1	Airdrieonians	Firhill Stadium
15:00	Diack 7'; Fordyce 37 o.g.'	Report	Watson 54'	Attendance: 3,179; Referee: Steven McLean

8 December 2023 15	Raith Rovers	4–3	Partick Thistle	Stark's Park
19:45	O'Reilly 13'; Easton 46'; Smith 79'; Stanton 82'	Report	O'Reilly 51 o.g.' Graham 32'; Alston 69'	Attendance: 3,447; Referee: Alan Muir

16 December 2023 16	Dunfermline Athletic	1–2	Partick Thistle	East End Park
15:00	Todd 82'	Report	Milne 12'; Graham 45'	Attendance: 4,777; Referee: Chris Graham

23 December 2023 17	Partick Thistle	1–1	Inverness CT	Firhill Stadium
15:00	McMillan 15'	Report	Anderson 1'	Attendance: 3,326; Referee: Graham Grainger

29 December 2023 18	Dundee United	3–0	Partick Thistle	Tannadice Park
19:45	Watt 7', 86', 89'	Report		Attendance: 8,110; Referee: Matthew MacDermid

2 January 2024 19	Partick Thistle	3–2	Queen's Park	Firhill Stadium
15:00	Milne 27'; Fitzpatrick 48'; Neilson 85'	Report	Paton 31', 90'	Attendance: 3,212; Referee: Steven Kirkland

6 January 2024 20	Partick Thistle	4–0	Arbroath	Firhill Stadium
15:00	Graham 12'; Fitzpatrick 51'; Adeloye 80', 82'	Report		Attendance: 3,481; Referee: Calum Scott

13 January 2024 21	Greenock Morton	1–1	Partick Thistle	Cappielow
15:00	McMillan 31 o.g.'	Report	Diack 75'	Attendance: 3,568; Referee: Craig Napier

27 January 2024 22	Airdrieonians	1–1	Partick Thistle	Excelsior Stadium
15:00	Watson 37'	Report	Adeloye 41'	Attendance: 2,422; Referee: Lloyd Wilson

17 February 2024 23	Inverness CT	3–3	Partick Thistle	Caledonian Stadium
15:00	Kerr 27'; Savage 54'; Shaw 79'; Anderson (red card) 90+2'	Report	Fitzpatrick 64'; Graham 77', 86 pen.'	Attendance: 2,215; Referee: Grant Irvine

23 February 2024 24	Partick Thistle	1–3	Dunfermline Athletic	Firhill Stadium
19:45	Graham 30'	Report	Fagan-Walcott 37'; Todd 55'; Benjamin 65'	Attendance: 3,350; Referee: David Munro

27 February 2024 25	Ayr United	4–3	Partick Thistle	Somerset Park
19:45	McAllister 15'; Willoughby 43', 45+2'; McHugh 84'	Report	Graham 33'; Adeloye 78'; Sanders 83 o.g.'	Attendance: 2,227; Referee: Graham Grainger

2 March 2024 26	Partick Thistle	1–1	Dundee United	Firhill Stadium
15:00	Graham 3'	Report	Moult 67'	Attendance: 4,448; Referee: Matthew MacDermid

9 March 2024 27	Queen's Park	2–2	Partick Thistle	Hampden Park
15:00	Sheridan 38'; Paton 52'	Report	Adeloye 64'; Graham 70 pen.'	Attendance: 3,001; Referee: Iain Snedden

12 March 2024 28	Partick Thistle	0–1	Raith Rovers	Firhill Stadium
19:45		Report	Murray 34'	Attendance: 2,319; Referee: Euan Anderson

16 March 2024 29	Partick Thistle	2–1	Greenock Morton	Firhill Stadium
15:00	Graham 28'; Robinson 52'	Report	Muirhead 90+4'	Attendance: 3,428; Referee: Dan McFarlane

23 March 2024 30	Arbroath	0–1	Partick Thistle	Gayfield Park
15:00		Report	Fitzpatrick 15'	Attendance: 1,048; Referee: Steven Kirkland

30 March 2024 31	Partick Thistle	1–0	Inverness CT	Firhill Stadium
15:00	Robinson 41'	Report	Kerr (red card) 66'	Attendance: 3,371; Referee: John Beaton

6 April 2024 32	Dunfermline Athletic	1–1	Partick Thistle	East End Park
15:00	Kane 79 pen.'	Report	Graham 24'	Attendance: 5,572; Referee: Calum Scott

13 April 2024 33	Raith Rovers	0–0	Partick Thistle	Stark's Park
15:00		Report		Attendance: 3,928; Referee: David Munro

20 April 2024 34	Partick Thistle	4–0	Airdrieonians	Firhill Stadium
15:00	Fitzpatrick 52'; Graham 61', 68'; Diack 85'	Report		Attendance: 3,972; Referee: Iain Snedden

27 April 2024 35	Partick Thistle	0–0	Ayr United	Firhill Stadium
15:00		Report		Attendance: 4,243; Referee: Matthew MacDermid

3 May 2024 36	Dundee United	4–1	Partick Thistle	Tannadice Park
19:45	Sibbald 42'; Fotheringham 59'; Watt 69'; Moult 83 pen.'	Report	Stanway 13'	Attendance: 11,802; Referee: Steven McLean

=== Premiership play-offs ===
7 May 2024 Quarter-finals 1st leg	Airdrieonians	2–2	Partick Thistle	Excelsior Stadium
19:45	Todorov 5'; McGill 50'	Report	McBeth 29'; Robinson 45'	Attendance: 3,163; Referee: Grant Irvine

10 May 2024 Quarter-finals 2nd leg	Partick Thistle	2–1 (4–3 agg.)	Airdrieonians	Firhill Stadium
19:45	Graham 18', 47'	Report	Lyall 55'	Attendance: 6,531; Referee: Colin Steven

14 May 2024 Semi-finals 1st leg	Partick Thistle	1–2	Raith Rovers	Firhill Stadium
19:45	Alston 72'	Report	Brown 22'; Vaughan 40'	Attendance: 5,497; Referee: Chris Graham

17 May 2024 Semi-finals 2nd leg	Raith Rovers	1–2 (3–3 agg.) (4–3 p)	Partick Thistle	Stark's Park
19:45	Matthews 30'	Report	Alston 16', 45+1'	Attendance: 6,070; Referee: Steven McLean

=== Scottish League Cup ===
==== Group stage ====
15 July 2023 Group stage	Peterhead	1–1 (9–10 p)	Partick Thistle	Balmoor Stadium
15:00	Ritchie 32'	Report	Milne 3'	Attendance: 834; Referee: Dan McFarlane

18 July 2023 Group stage	Dundee United	1–2	Partick Thistle	Tannadice Park
19:45	Sibbald 18'	Report	Graham 32'; Milne 58'	Attendance: 3,147; Referee: Matthew MacDermid

23 July 2023 Group stage	Partick Thistle	2–2 (6–7 p)	Falkirk	Firhill Stadium
15:00	Graham 68'; Lyon 90+3'	Report	MacIver 14'; Spencer (red card) 67'; Agyeman 71'	Attendance: 2,607; Referee: Steven Kirkland

29 July 2023 Group stage	Partick Thistle	2–1	The Spartans	Firhill Stadium
15:00	Lyon 52'; Graham 88 pen.'	Report	Henderson 81'; Craigen (red card) 88'	Attendance: 2,231; Referee: Gavin Duncan

==== Knockout phase ====
19 August 2023 Second round	Heart of Midlothian	4–0	Partick Thistle	Tynecastle Park
15:00	Graham 11 o.g.' Offiah 45'; Shankland 48'; Tagawa 74'	Report		Attendance: 12,841; Referee: John Beaton

=== Scottish Challenge Cup ===
9 September 2023 Third round	Partick Thistle	2–3	Queen of the South	Firhill Stadium
15:00	Lawless 11 pen.' Stanway 48'	Report	McGuffie 7'; Reilly 24'; Ambrose 87'	Attendance: 2,307; Referee: Euan Anderson

=== Scottish Cup ===
25 November 2023 Third round	Partick Thistle	3–0	Queen's Park	Firhill Stadium
15:00	Alston 36'; Fitzpatrick 41', 50'	Report		Attendance: 2,520; Referee: Iain Snedden

20 January 2024 Fourth round	Ross County	0–3	Partick Thistle	Victoria Park
15:00		Report	Graham 37'; Robinson 45+1'; Bannigan 54'	Attendance: 2,116; Referee: David Dickinson

10 February 2024 Fifth round	Partick Thistle	2–3 (a.e.t.)	Livingston	Firhill Stadium
15:00	McInroy 27'; Fitzpatrick 61'	Report	Nouble 66', 82'; Yengi 120'	Attendance: 3,843; Referee: Nick Walsh

=== Glasgow Cup ===
28 November 2023 Group stage	Rangers B	6–0	Partick Thistle	Rangers Training Centre
15:00	Gentles; Stevens; McKinnon; Paul Nsio	Report

10 April 2024 Group stage	Partick Thistle	1–4	Queen's Park	Petershill Park
	Horn 63'	Report	McCormick 14', 19'; Williamson; Fiddes 73'

24 April 2024 Group stage	Celtic B	6–3	Partick Thistle	Lennoxtown Training Centre
19:45	Davidson 2', 7'; Dobbie 11', 15'; Quinn 48', 73'	Report	9'; 22'; 33'

== Squad statistics ==
=== Player statistics ===
As of 17 May 2024 (UTC)

No.	Pos	Nat	Player	Total		Championship + Playoffs		League Cup		Challenge Cup		Scottish Cup		Glasgow Cup	
No.	Pos	Nat	Player	Apps	Goals	Apps	Goals	Apps	Goals	Apps	Goals	Apps	Goals	Apps	Goals
1	GK	(Scotland) SCO	Jamie Sneddon	27	0	21+0	0	2+0	0	1+0	0	2+0	0	1+0	0
2	DF	(Scotland) SCO	Jack McMillan	37	2	31+1	2	1+0	0	1+0	0	2+0	0	1+0	0
3	DF	(Scotland) SCO	Harry Milne	47	5	37+2	3	5+0	2	1+0	0	2+0	0	0+0	0
4	DF	(England) ENG	Wasiri Williams	20	0	9+2	0	5+0	0	1+0	0	0+2	0	1+0	0
5	DF	(Scotland) SCO	Aaron Muirhead	47	0	38+0	0	5+0	0	1+0	0	2+0	0	1+0	0
6	DF	(Scotland) SCO	Lewis Neilson	43	1	37+3	1	0+0	0	0+0	0	2+0	0	1+0	0
7	MF	(Scotland) SCO	Kerr McInroy	39	5	34+1	4	1+0	0	0+1	0	2+0	1	0+0	0
8	MF	(Scotland) SCO	Stuart Bannigan	40	1	23+8	0	5+0	0	1+0	0	2+0	1	1+0	0
9	FW	(Scotland) SCO	Brian Graham	46	26	37+0	22	5+0	3	0+1	0	2+0	1	1+0	0
11	MF	(Scotland) SCO	Steven Lawless	41	5	32+0	4	5+0	0	1+0	1	2+0	0	1+0	0
12	DF	(Malawi) MWI	Kieran Ngwenya	21	0	8+11	0	0+1	0	0+0	0	0+1	0	0+0	0
17	FW	(Scotland) SCO	Scott Robinson	31	5	17+12	4	0+0	0	1+0	0	1+0	1	0+0	0
19	MF	(Scotland) SCO	Luke McBeth	21	1	17+4	1	0+0	0	0+0	0	0+0	0	0+0	0
20	DF	(Republic of Ireland) IRL	Daniel O'Reilly	8	0	2+6	0	0+0	0	0+0	0	0+0	0	0+0	0
21	MF	(Scotland) SCO	Aidan Fitzpatrick	47	11	37+1	8	5+0	0	0+1	0	2+0	1	1+0	2
23	MF	(Scotland) SCO	Blair Alston	32	6	8+20	5	0+1	0	0+0	0	0+2	0	1+0	1
25	GK	(Scotland) SCO	Ross Stewart	3	0	3+0	0	0+0	0	0+0	0	0+0	0	0+0	0
26	MF	(Scotland) SCO	Ben Stanway	36	1	20+7	0	3+2	0	1+0	1	1+1	0	1+0	0
29	MF	(Scotland) SCO	Zander MacKenzie	24	0	3+15	0	4+0	0	0+0	0	0+1	0	0+1	0
31	GK	(Scotland) SCO	David Mitchell	19	0	16+0	0	3+0	0	0+0	0	0+0	0	0+0	0
34	FW	(Scotland) SCO	Ricco Diack	19	3	2+14	3	0+0	0	0+1	0	0+2	0	0+0	0
36	MF	(Scotland) SCO	Ché Campbell	1	0	0+1	0	0+0	0	0+0	0	0+0	0	0+0	0
38	FW	(Scotland) SCO	Ceiran Loney	2	0	0+1	0	0+0	0	0+0	0	0+0	0	1+0	0
99	FW	(England) ENG	Tomi Adeloye	27	7	2+19	7	0+2	0	1+0	0	0+2	0	0+1	0
Players who left the club during the 2023–24 season
10	FW	(Scotland) SCO	Anton Dowds	4	0	0+1	0	1+2	0	0+0	0	0+0	0	0+0	0
19	DF	(England) ENG	Nathan McGinley	0	0	0+0	0	0+0	0	0+0	0	0+0	0	0+0	0
22	MF	(Scotland) SCO	Ben Williamson	13	0	3+5	0	4+0	0	0+0	0	0+0	0	0+1	0
24	GK	(United States) USA	Mason McCready	0	0	0+0	0	0+0	0	0+0	0	0+0	0	0+0	0
25	FW	(England) ENG	Wes McDonald	6	0	0+4	0	0+0	0	1+0	0	0+0	0	0+1	0
27	MF	(Scotland) SCO	James Lyon	9	3	1+2	1	1+4	2	0+0	0	0+0	0	0+1	0
30	MF	(Scotland) SCO	Ji Stevenson	1	0	0+0	0	0+1	0	0+0	0	0+0	0	0+0	0
32	FW	(Scotland) SCO	Sallu Turay	0	0	0+0	0	0+0	0	0+0	0	0+0	0	0+0	0
33	MF	(Scotland) SCO	Jamie Taggart	0	0	0+0	0	0+0	0	0+0	0	0+0	0	0+0	0

== Club statistics ==
=== League table ===
Pos	Team	Pld	W	D	L	GF	GA	GD	Pts	Promotion, qualification or relegation
1	Dundee United (C, P)	36	22	9	5	73	23	+50	75	Promotion to the Premiership
2	Raith Rovers	36	20	9	7	58	42	+16	69	Qualification for the Premiership play-off semi-final
3	Partick Thistle	36	14	13	9	63	54	+9	55	Qualification for the Premiership play-off quarter-final
4	Airdrieonians	36	15	7	14	44	44	0	52	Qualification for the Premiership play-off quarter-final
5	Greenock Morton	36	12	9	15	43	46	−3	45	

Rules for classification: 1) Points; 2) Goal difference; 3) Goals scored; 4) Head-to-to head points; 5) Head-to-head goal difference; 6) Play-off (only for deciding promotion, play-off participation and relegation).
(C) Champions; (P) Promoted

=== League Cup table ===
Pos	Team	Pld	W	PW	PL	L	GF	GA	GD	Pts	Qualification	PAR	FAL	DUN	SPA	PET
1	Partick Thistle	4	2	1	1	0	7	5	+2	9	Qualification for the second round	—	2–2p	—	2–1	—
2	Falkirk	4	2	1	0	1	8	5	+3	8		—	—	0–1	—	4–1
3	Dundee United	4	2	0	0	2	5	3	+2	6		1–2	—	—	—	3–0
4	The Spartans	4	2	0	0	2	5	5	0	6		—	1–2	1–0	—	—
5	Peterhead	4	0	0	1	3	3	10	−7	1		1–1p	—	—	1–2	—

Rules for classification: 1) goal difference, 2) goals scored, 3) away goals scored, 4) matches won, 5) away matches won, 6) drawing of lots.

== Transfers ==
=== In ===
Date	Position	Nationality	Name	From	Fee
26 June 2023	FW	(Scotland)	Scott Robinson	Kilmarnock	Free
26 June 2023	DF	(England)	Wasiri Williams	Swansea City	Free
29 July 2023	MF	(Scotland)	Blair Alston	Kilmarnock	Free
10 August 2023	FW	(England)	Wes McDonald	Hartlepool United	Free
1 January 2024	MF	(Scotland)	Luke McBeth	Glenafton Athletic	Undisclosed
6 January 2024	GK	(Scotland)	Ross Stewart	Free agent	Free
9 January 2024	DF	(Republic of Ireland)	Daniel O'Reilly	Raith Rovers	Free

=== Out ===
Date	Position	Nationality	Name	To	Fee
8 June 2023	DF	(Scotland)	Darren Brownlie	Dundalk	Free
8 June 2023	FW	(Scotland)	Danny Mullen	Derry City	Free
8 June 2023	FW	(Scotland)	Gospel Ocholi	Gala Fairydean Rovers	Free
8 June 2023	MF	(Scotland)	Billy Owens	Kelty Hearts	Free
8 June 2023	MF	(Scotland)	Cammy Smith	Morecambe	Free
8 June 2023	FW	(Scotland)	Scott Tiffoney	Dundee	Free
19 June 2023	MF	(Scotland)	Ross Docherty	Dundee United	Free
19 June 2023	DF	(Scotland)	Kevin Holt	Dundee United	Free
19 June 2023	MF	(Scotland)	Kyle Turner	Ross County	Free
4 August 2023	DF	(Northern Ireland)	Gallagher Lennon	St Mirren	Free
1 January 2024	FW	(England)	Wes McDonald		Free

=== Loans in ===
Date	Position	Nationality	Name	From	Fee
18 July 2023	MF	(Scotland)	Ben Williamson	Rangers	Loan
27 July 2023	FW	(England)	Tomi Adeloye	Swindon Town	Loan
3 August 2023	MF	(Scotland)	Kerr McInroy	Kilmarnock	Loan
3 August 2023	DF	(Scotland)	Lewis Neilson	Heart of Midlothian	Loan
10 August 2023	DF	(Malawi)	Kieran Ngwenya	Aberdeen	Loan
30 September 2023	DF	(England)	Nathan McGinley	Motherwell	Loan

=== Loans out ===
Date	Position	Nationality	Name	To	Fee
11 August 2023	MF	(Scotland)	Jamie Taggart	Gartcairn	Loan
11 August 2023	DF	(Scotland)	Sallu Turay	Gartcairn	Loan
25 August 2023	MF	(Scotland)	Ji Stevenson	Clyde	Loan
12 September 2023	FW	(Scotland)	Anton Dowds	Ayr United	Loan
3 November 2023	GK	(United States)	Mason McCready	Gretna 2008	Loan
13 January 2024	GK	(United States)	Mason McCready	The Spartans	Loan
2 February 2024	MF	(Scotland)	Ji Stevenson	Cumnock Juniors	Loan
14 February 2024	MF	(Scotland)	James Lyon	East Fife	Loan

== See also ==
- List of Partick Thistle F.C. seasons
