= 2022–23 Partick Thistle F.C. season =

Partick Thistle
2022–23 season
- Chairman: Jacqui Low
- Manager: Ian McCall (until 12 February); Kris Doolan (from 3 March)
- Stadium: Firhill Stadium
- Scottish Championship: 4th
- Premiership play-offs: Runners-up
- Scottish Cup: Fifth round
- League Cup: Quarter-final
- Challenge Cup: Third round
- Glasgow Cup: Semi-finals
- Top goalscorer: League: Brian Graham (13); All: Brian Graham (21)
- Highest home attendance: 7,291 vs. Ross County, Premiership play-off, 1 June 2023
- Lowest home attendance: 1,344 vs. Fraserburgh, League Cup, 19 July 2022
- Average home league attendance: 3,122
Home colours	Away colours	Third colours

The 2022–23 season was Partick Thistle's second season back in the Scottish Championship, having been promoted from League One at the end of the 2020–21 season. Thistle also competed in the League Cup, Challenge Cup, Scottish Cup and Glasgow Cup.

== Results and fixtures ==
Win Draw Loss Postponed

=== Pre-season ===
21 June 2022	Alloa Athletic	1–3	Partick Thistle	Alloa
19:30	Cawley 55'	Report	Graham 45'; Turner 70'; Dowds 84 pen.'	Stadium: Recreation Park

24 June 2022	Kelty Hearts	0–1	Partick Thistle	Kelty
19:45		Report	Lyon 71'	Stadium: New Central Park

2 July 2022	Rangers	3–2	Partick Thistle	Glasgow
19:30	Lundstram 2'; Sakala 40'; McPake 85'	Report	Graham 15'; Smith 47'	Stadium: Rangers Training Centre

16 July 2022	Partick Thistle	0–1	Motherwell	Glasgow
19:30		Report	Efford	Stadium: Firhill Stadium

=== Scottish Championship ===
30 July 2022 1	Dundee	2–3	Partick Thistle	Dens Park
15:00	Kerr 64'; French 85'	Report	Fitzpatrick 16'; Lawless 24'; McKinnon 50'	Attendance: 5,513; Referee: Alan Muir

6 August 2022 2	Partick Thistle	1–1	Hamilton Academical	Firhill Stadium
15:00	Graham 83'	Report	McMillan 43 o.g.'	Attendance: 2,970; Referee: Craig Napier

13 August 2022 3	Queen's Park	3–2	Partick Thistle	Ochilview Park
15:00	Savoury 36'; Robson 67'; Murray 76'	Report	McMillan 64'; Dowds 87'	Attendance: 1,357; Referee: Steven McLean

19 August 2022 4	Partick Thistle	4–1	Inverness CT	Firhill Stadium
19:45	Graham 21', 35'; Holt 59 pen.' Dowds 84'	Report	Oakley 90+2'	Attendance: 2,632; Referee: Grant Irvine

27 August 2022 5	Partick Thistle	2–1	Raith Rovers	Firhill Stadium
15:00	Tiffoney 3'; Lawless 42'	Report	Ross 43'	Attendance: 3,211; Referee: Matthew MacDermid

3 September 2022 6	Arbroath	0–2	Partick Thistle	Gayfield Park
15:00	Allan (red card) 50'	Report	Dowds 86'; McKinnon 90'	Attendance: 2,065; Referee: Duncan Williams

17 September 2022 7	Partick Thistle	2–2	Cove Rangers	Firhill Stadium
15:00	Lawless 17'; Bannigan 52'	Report	Reynolds 81', 84'	Attendance: 2,918; Referee: Calum Scott

1 October 2022 8	Partick Thistle	5–1	Greenock Morton	Firhill Stadium
15:00	Graham 27'; Holt 34'; Muirhead 55'; Tiffoney 77'; Dowds 84'	Report	Muirhead 17'	Attendance: 2,932; Referee: William Collum

7 October 2022 9	Inverness CT	1–0	Partick Thistle	Caledonian Stadium
19:30	Mckay 75'	Report	Turner (red card) 40'	Attendance: 2,354; Referee: Scott Lambie

15 October 2022 10	Hamilton Academical	1–2	Partick Thistle	New Douglas Park
15:00	Ryan 53'	Report	Graham 33'; Tiffoney 65'	Attendance: 1,991; Referee: Barry Cook

22 October 2022 11	Partick Thistle	0−4	Queen's Park	Glasgow
15:00		Report	Robson 26'; Eze 49'; McPake 54', 84'	Stadium: Firhill Stadium; Attendance: 3,088; Referee: Chris Graham

25 October 2022 12	Ayr United	4−2	Partick Thistle	Ayr
19:45	Chalmers 11'; Brownlie 39 o.g.' Mullin 55'; McKenzie 90+1'	Report	Hodson 18'; Graham 51'	Stadium: Somerset Park; Attendance: 2,782; Referee: William Collum

29 October 2022 13	Raith Rovers	3−0	Partick Thistle	Kirkcaldy
15:00	Connolly 12', 32'; Connell 44 pen.'	Report		Stadium: Stark's Park; Attendance: 2,096; Referee: Gavin Duncan

5 November 2022 14	Partick Thistle	2−3	Dundee	Glasgow
15:00	Mline 21', 36'; Muirhead (red card) 69'	Report	Robinson 58'; Sweeney 68'; Kerr 76'	Stadium: Firhill Stadium; Attendance: 3,046; Referee: Craig Napier

12 November 2022 15	Greenock Morton	2−1	Partick Thistle	Greenock
15:00	Ambrose 21'; Blues 79'	Report	Dowds 58'; Akinola (red card) 90+3'	Stadium: Cappielow; Attendance: 2,499; Referee: Graham Grainger

19 November 2022 16	Partick Thistle	3−0	Arbroath	Glasgow
15:00	Graham 16'; Turner 79'; Milne 84'	Report		Stadium: Firhill Stadium; Attendance: 2,839; Referee: Lloyd Wilson

3 December 2022 17	Cove Rangers	1−1	Partick Thistle	Aberdeen
15:00	Megginson 6'	Report	Sneddon 90+5'	Stadium: Balmoral Stadium; Attendance: 1,128; Referee: Steven McLean

17 December 2022 18	Partick Thistle	3−2	Ayr United	Glasgow
15:00	Milne 21'; Graham 45+1'; Lawless 56'	Report	Akinyemi 9'; Chalmers 47'	Stadium: Firhill Stadium; Attendance: 2,831; Referee: David Munro

23 December 2022 19	Partick Thistle	5−1	Inverness CT	Glasgow
19:45	Graham 16'; Turner 39'; McKinnon 53'; Muirhead 57'; Mullen 74'	Report	Doran 73'; Duffy (red card) 77'	Stadium: Firhill Stadium; Attendance: 2,243; Referee: Peter Stuart

2 January 2023 20	Queen's Park	2−0	Partick Thistle	Stenhousemuir
15:00	Murray 5'; Jarrett 76'	Report		Stadium: Ochilview Park; Attendance: 1,665; Referee: Steven Kirkland

7 January 2023 21	Partick Thistle	2−1	Greenock Morton	Glasgow
15:00	Lawless 51 pen.' Docherty 89'	Report	Baird 57'	Stadium: Firhill Stadium; Attendance: 3,640; Referee: Alan Muir

28 January 2023 22	Partick Thistle	0−1	Hamilton Academical	Glasgow
15:00		Report	Stephenson 54'	Stadium: Firhill Stadium; Attendance: 2,868; Referee: Greg Aitken

4 February 2023 23	Partick Thistle	0−1	Cove Rangers	Glasgow
15:00	Graham (red card) 70'	Report	Megginson 27'	Stadium: Firhill Stadium; Attendance: 2,432; Referee: Duncan Williams

18 February 2023 24	Ayr United	0−1	Partick Thistle	Ayr
15:00		Report	Mullen 32'	Stadium: Somerset Park; Attendance: 3,097; Referee: Nick Walsh

25 February 2023 25	Arbroath	0−0	Partick Thistle	Arbroath
15:00		Report		Stadium: Gayfield Park; Attendance: 2,057; Referee: Graham Grainger

28 February 2023 26	Dundee	1−3	Partick Thistle	Dundee
19:45	McGhee 80'	Report	Graham 42', 75'; Milne 80'	Stadium: Dens Park; Attendance: 4,622; Referee: Don Robertson

4 March 2023 27	Partick Thistle	3−0	Raith Rovers	Glasgow
15:00	Tiffoney 39', 63'; Graham 53'	Report		Stadium: Firhill Stadium; Attendance: 3,302; Referee: Greg Aitken

11 March 2023 28	Greenock Morton	0−0	Partick Thistle	Greenock
15:00		Report		Stadium: Cappielow; Attendance: 3,119; Referee: Alan Muir

18 March 2023 29	Partick Thistle	0−0	Dundee	Glasgow
15:00		Report		Stadium: Firhill Stadium; Attendance: 3,656; Referee: Alan Newlands

24 March 2023 30	Inverness CT	1−0	Partick Thistle	Inverness
19:45	Shaw 50'; Welsh (red card) 56'	Report		Stadium: Caledonian Stadium; Attendance: 2,075; Referee: Grant Irvine

1 April 2023 31	Cove Rangers	0−5	Partick Thistle	Aberdeen
15:00		Report	Tiffoney 11'; Lawless 18'; Graham 58'; Holt 62'; Mullen 90'	Stadium: Balmoral Stadium; Attendance: 1,044; Referee: Duncan Williams

7 April 2023 32	Partick Thistle	4−0	Queen's Park	Glasgow
19:45	Holt 50', 90+2'; Turner 67'; Mullen 86'	Report		Stadium: Firhill Stadium; Attendance: 3,783; Referee: William Collum

15 April 2023 33	Partick Thistle	1−1	Ayr United	Glasgow
15:00	Tiffoney 14'	Report	Akinyemi 72'	Stadium: Firhill Stadium; Attendance: 4,102; Referee: Grant Irvine

22 April 2023 34	Hamilton Academical	2−2	Partick Thistle	Hamilton
15:00	O'Reilly 36', 89'	Report	Graham 28'; Lawless 90+2'	Stadium: New Douglas Park; Attendance: 2,093; Referee: David Dickinson

29 April 2023 35	Partick Thistle	2−0	Arbroath	Glasgow
15:00	Turner 40', 61'	Report		Stadium: Firhill Stadium; Attendance: 3,701; Referee: Euan Anderson

5 May 2023 36	Raith Rovers	2−2	Partick Thistle	Kirkcaldy
19:45	Vaughan 35 pen.' McGill 59'	Report	Brownlie 21'; Tiffoney 68'	Stadium: Stark's Park; Attendance: 2,899; Referee: Chris Graham

=== Premiership play-offs ===
9 May 2023 Quarter-final 1st Leg	Partick Thistle	4−3	Queen's Park	Glasgow
19:45	Turner 15'; McMillan 28'; Fitzpatrick 69'; Graham 90+7'	Report	Thomas 33', 87'; Boateng 83'	Stadium: Firhill Stadium; Attendance: 3,754; Referee: Kevin Clancy

12 May 2023 Quarter-final 2nd Leg	Queen's Park	0−4 (3−8 agg.)	Partick Thistle	Stenhousemuir
19:45		Report	Graham 14'; Tiffoney 28'; Holt 41'; Mullen 82'	Stadium: Ochilview Park; Attendance: 1,581; Referee: Colin Steven

19 May 2023 Semi-final 1st Leg	Partick Thistle	3−0	Ayr United	Glasgow
19:45	McMillan 16'; Graham 50', 72'	Report		Stadium: Firhill Stadium; Attendance: 7,012; Referee: Greg Aitken

26 May 2023 Semi-final 2nd Leg	Ayr United	0−5 (0−8 agg.)	Partick Thistle	Ayr
19:45	Akinyemi (red card) 25'	Report	McMillan 7'; Tiffoney 27', 54'; Lawless 63'; Holt 88'	Stadium: Somerset Park; Referee: Colin Steven

1 June 2023 Final 1st Leg	Partick Thistle	2−0	Ross County	Glasgow
19:45	Fitzpatrick 9'; Graham 45'	Report	Smith (red card) 17'	Stadium: Firhill Stadium; Attendance: 7,291; Referee: David Munro

4 June 2023 Final 2nd Leg	Ross County	3−1 (a.e.t.) (3−3 agg.) (5−4 p)	Partick Thistle	Dingwall
16:30	Dhanda 71 pen.' Murray 72'; Harmon 90+1'	Report	Fitzpatrick 43'	Stadium: Victoria Park; Attendance: 4,533; Referee: Nick Walsh

=== Scottish League Cup ===
==== Group stage ====
9 July 2022 Group stage	Stenhousemuir	1–2	Partick Thistle	Ochilview Park
15:00	Yates 63'	Report	Turner 54'; Graham 75'	Referee: Calum Scott

13 July 2022 Group stage	Kilmarnock	1–1 (4–5 p)	Partick Thistle	Rugby Park
19:45	Donnelly 11'	Report	Muirhead 44'	Attendance: 3,012; Referee: Nick Walsh

19 July 2022 Group stage	Partick Thistle	2–0	Fraserburgh	Firhill Stadium
19:45	Hay 33 o.g.' Graham 62'	Report		Attendance: 1,344; Referee: Scott Lambie

23 July 2022 Group stage	Partick Thistle	4–2	Montrose	Firhill Stadium
15:00	McMillan 17'; Holt 45+1'; Fitzpatrick 66'; Mullen 81'	Report	Brown 55'; Johnston 85'	Attendance: 1,578; Referee: Duncan Williams

==== Knockout phase ====
30 August 2022 Second Round	Partick Thistle	1–0	Arbroath	Firhill Stadium
19:45	Fitzpatrick 83'	Report		Attendance: 1,960; Referee: John Beaton

19 October 2022 Quarter-final	Aberdeen	4–1	Partick Thistle	Pittodrie Stadium
19:45	Duk 16'; Holt 31 o.g.' Coulson 35'; Duncan 85'	Report	Brownlie 53'	Attendance: 9,323; Referee: David Munro

=== Scottish Challenge Cup ===
23 September 2022 Third round	Falkirk	2–0	Partick Thistle	Falkirk Stadium
19:45	Burrell 9'; Oliver 65'	Report		Attendance: 2,720; Referee: Lloyd Wilson

=== Scottish Cup ===
26 November 2022 Third Round	Partick Thistle	3–0	Kelty Hearts	Firhill Stadium
15:00	Graham 7'; Docherty (red card) 38'; Dowds 58'; Weston 79'	Report	Cardle (red card) 38'	Attendance: 1,484; Referee: Craig Napier

21 January 2023 Fourth Round	Partick Thistle	1–1 (a.e.t.) (4–2 p)	Dunfermline Athletic	Firhill Stadium
15:00	Fitzpatrick 51'	Report	Benedictus 42 pen.'	Attendance: 3,218; Referee: Scott Lambie

12 February 2023 Fifth Round	Rangers	3–2	Partick Thistle	Ibrox Stadium
16:00	Čolak 50'; Tillman 71'; Sands 86'	Report	Holt 35 pen.' Tiffoney 74'	Attendance: 44,636; Referee: David Munro

=== Glasgow Cup ===
29 November 2022 Group stage	Queen's Park	2–1	Partick Thistle	Glasgow
15:00	Connolly 9'; Fairlie 81'	Report	Weston 3'	Stadium: Lochinch Park

17 January 2023 Group stage	Rangers B	5–1	Partick Thistle	Milngavie
14:30	Weston 31'; Lovelace 36'; Lindsay 43'; Graham 83'; Ure 87'	Report	Harkness 46 o.g.' Docherty (red card) 61'	Stadium: Rangers Training Centre

11 April 2023 Semi-finals	Celtic B	4–0	Partick Thistle	Lennoxtown
14:00	Letsosa 17', 29'; Thomson 77'; McPherson 88'	Report		Stadium: Lennoxtown training centre

== Squad statistics ==
=== Player statistics ===
As of 4 June 2023 (UTC)

No.	Pos	Nat	Player	Total		Championship		League Cup		Challenge Cup		Scottish Cup		Glasgow Cup	
No.	Pos	Nat	Player	Apps	Goals	Apps	Goals	Apps	Goals	Apps	Goals	Apps	Goals	Apps	Goals
1	GK	(Scotland) SCO	Jamie Sneddon	20	1	13+0	1	3+0	0	1+0	0	3+0	0	0+0	0
2	DF	(Scotland) SCO	Jack McMillan	52	5	42+0	4	6+0	1	1+0	0	3+0	0	0+0	0
3	DF	(Scotland) SCO	Harry Milne	36	5	27+0	5	5+0	0	0+1	0	3+0	0	0+0	0
4	DF	(Scotland) SCO	Kevin Holt	39	9	28+3	7	6+0	1	0+0	0	2+0	1	0+0	0
5	DF	(Scotland) SCO	Darren Brownlie	33	1	22+5	1	1+2	0	1+0	0	1+1	0	0+0	0
6	MF	(Scotland) SCO	Kyle Turner	50	7	37+4	6	4+1	1	1+0	0	3+0	0	0+0	0
7	FW	(Scotland) SCO	Scott Tiffoney	36	12	23+8	11	2+0	0	0+0	0	2+0	1	1+0	0
8	MF	(Scotland) SCO	Stuart Bannigan	46	1	32+5	1	5+0	0	1+0	0	3+0	0	0+0	0
9	FW	(Scotland) SCO	Brian Graham	45	22	35+2	19	4+2	2	0+0	0	2+0	1	0+0	0
10	FW	(Scotland) SCO	Anton Dowds	35	6	5+23	5	2+2	0	0+0	0	0+3	1	0+0	0
11	MF	(Scotland) SCO	Steven Lawless	48	8	39+1	8	5+1	0	0+1	0	1+0	0	0+0	0
14	MF	(Scotland) SCO	Cammy Smith	19	0	3+8	0	4+1	0	1+0	0	0+2	0	0+0	0
15	MF	(Scotland) SCO	Cole McKinnon	31	3	16+9	3	3+2	0	0+0	0	1+0	0	0+0	0
16	DF	(Northern Ireland) NIR	Lee Hodson	30	1	13+12	1	0+1	0	1+0	0	2+1	0	0+0	0
18	DF	(Scotland) SCO	Connor McAvoy	6	0	4+1	0	0+0	0	0+0	0	1+0	0	0+0	0
19	FW	(Scotland) SCO	Danny Mullen	35	6	5+26	5	0+2	1	1+0	0	1+0	0	0+0	0
21	MF	(Scotland) SCO	Aidan Fitzpatrick	48	7	18+22	4	1+3	2	1+0	0	1+1	1	1+0	0
22	DF	(Scotland) SCO	Aaron Muirhead	41	3	31+2	2	5+0	1	0+0	0	3+0	0	0+0	0
23	MF	(Scotland) SCO	Ross Docherty	38	1	29+0	1	6+0	0	0+0	0	1+1	0	1+0	0
25	MF	(Scotland) SCO	Billy Owens	2	0	0+0	0	0+0	0	0+0	0	0+0	0	2+0	0
27	MF	(Scotland) SCO	James Lyon	9	0	0+2	0	0+2	0	0+1	0	0+1	0	3+0	0
29	MF	(Scotland) SCO	Zander MacKenzie	17	0	0+12	0	0+1	0	0+1	0	0+2	0	1+0	0
30	MF	(Scotland) SCO	Ji Stevenson	2	0	0+0	0	0+0	0	0+0	0	0+0	0	2+0	0
31	GK	(Scotland) SCO	David Mitchell	32	0	28+0	0	3+0	0	0+0	0	0+0	0	1+0	0
34	MF	(Scotland) SCO	Ricco Diack	3	0	0+1	0	0+0	0	0+0	0	0+0	0	2+0	0
Players who left the club during the 2022–23 season
17	FW	(England) ENG	Tony Weston	19	2	0+13	0	0+3	0	1+0	0	0+1	1	1+0	1
18	DF	(England) ENG	Tunji Akinola	13	0	5+1	0	1+2	0	1+0	0	0+1	0	2+0	0
24	GK	(United States) USA	Mason McCready	1	0	0+0	0	0+0	0	0+0	0	0+0	0	1+0	0
26	MF	(Scotland) SCO	Ben Stanway	3	0	0+2	0	0+0	0	0+1	0	0+0	0	0+0	0
28	FW	(Scotland) SCO	Gospel Ocholi	2	0	0+0	0	0+0	0	0+0	0	0+0	0	1+1	0

== Club statistics ==
=== League table ===
Pos	Team	Pld	W	D	L	GF	GA	GD	Pts	Promotion, qualification or relegation
2	Ayr United	36	16	10	10	61	43	+18	58	Qualification for the Premiership play-off semi-final
3	Queen's Park	36	17	7	12	63	52	+11	58	Qualification for the Premiership play-off quarter-final
4	Partick Thistle	36	16	9	11	65	45	+20	57	Qualification for the Premiership play-off quarter-final
5	Greenock Morton	36	15	12	9	53	43	+10	57	
6	Inverness Caledonian Thistle	36	15	10	11	52	47	+5	55	

Rules for classification: 1) Points; 2) Goal difference; 3) Goals scored; 4) Head-to-to head points; 5) Head-to-head goal difference; 6) Play-off (only for deciding promotion, play-off participation and relegation).

=== League Cup table ===
Pos	Team	Pld	W	PW	PL	L	GF	GA	GD	Pts	Qualification	PAR	KIL	STE	MON	FRA
1	Partick Thistle	4	3	1	0	0	9	4	+5	11	Qualification for the second round	—	—	—	4–2	2–0
2	Kilmarnock	4	3	0	1	0	11	3	+8	10	Qualification for the second round	1–1p	—	4–1	—	—
3	Stenhousemuir	4	2	0	0	2	7	6	+1	6		1–2	—	—	—	3–0
4	Montrose	4	1	0	0	3	6	11	−5	3		—	0–3	0–2	—	—
5	Fraserburgh	4	0	0	0	4	3	12	−9	0		—	1–3	—	2–4	—

Rules for classification: 1) goal difference, 2) goals scored, 3) away goals scored, 4) matches won, 5) away matches won, 6) drawing of lots.

== Transfers ==
=== In ===
Date	Position	Nationality	Name	From	Fee
16 May 2022	DF	(Scotland)	Aaron Muirhead	Ayr United	Free
1 June 2022	DF	(Scotland)	Jack McMillan	Livingston	Free
13 June 2022	MF	(Scotland)	Steven Lawless	Dunfermline Athletic	Free
13 June 2022	FW	(Scotland)	Anton Dowds	Falkirk	Free
23 June 2022	GK	(Scotland)	David Mitchell	Hibernian	Free
1 July 2022	DF	(Scotland)	Harry Milne	Cove Rangers	Free
13 July 2022	MF	(Scotland)	Aidan Fitzpatrick	Queen of the South	Free
21 July 2022	FW	(Scotland)	Danny Mullen	Dundee	Free

=== Out ===
Date	Position	Nationality	Name	To	Fee
9 May 2022	DF	(Scotland)	Richard Foster	Detroit City	Free
9 May 2022	DF	(Scotland)	Steven Bell	Kelty Hearts	Free
9 May 2022	DF	(Scotland)	Stephen Hendrie	Queen of the South	Free
25 May 2022	FW	(Scotland)	Ross MacIver	Alloa Athletic	Free
13 June 2022	MF	(Scotland)	Connor Murray	Queen of the South	Free
25 June 2022	MF	(Northern Ireland)	Shea Gordon	Larne	Free
23 June 2022	MF	(Senegal)	Mouhamed Niang	Hartlepool United	Free
25 June 2022	DF	(Scotland)	Ciaran McKenna	Queen of the South	Free
1 July 2022	FW	(Scotland)	Zak Rudden	Dundee	Undisclosed
18 August 2022	MF	(Scotland)	Robbie Crawford	Greenock Morton	Free
25 January 2023	DF	(England)	Tunji Akinola	Free agent	Free

=== Loans in ===
Date	Position	Nationality	Name	From	Fee
12 July 2022	FW	(England)	Tony Weston	Rangers	Loan
13 July 2022	MF	(Scotland)	Cole McKinnon	Rangers	Loan
12 August 2022	DF	(Northern Ireland)	Lee Hodson	Kilmarnock	Loan
31 January 2023	DF	(Scotland)	Connor McAvoy	Fulham	Loan

=== Loans out ===
Date	Position	Nationality	Name	To	Fee
8 July 2022	GK	(Scotland)	Mason McCready	Cowdenbeath	Loan
23 July 2022	FW	(Scotland)	Gospel Ocholi	Dalbeattie Star	Loan
13 August 2022	GK	(United States)	Mason McCready	Dalbeattie Star	Loan
1 January 2023	MF	(Scotland)	Ben Stanway	Airdrieonians	Loan
13 January 2023	MF	(Scotland)	Gospel Ocholi	Gala Fairydean Rovers	Loan

== See also ==
- List of Partick Thistle F.C. seasons
