= 2010–11 Annan Athletic F.C. season =

Annan Athletic
2010–11 season
- Chairman: Henry McLelland
- Manager: Harry Cairney
- Stadium: Galabank
- Third Division: Fourth place
- Challenge Cup: First round, lost to Stenhousemuir
- League Cup: First round, lost to Partick Thistle
- Scottish Cup: Third round, lost to Brechin City
- Top goalscorer: League: Ian Harty (14); All: Ian Harty (17)
- Highest home attendance: 671 vs. Stranraer, 21 August 2010
- Lowest home attendance: 293 vs. Queen's Park, 1 February 2011
- Average home league attendance: 457

The 2010–11 season was Annan Athletic's third consecutive season in the Scottish Third Division, having been admitted to the Scottish Football League at the start of the 2008–09 season. Annan also competed in the Challenge Cup, League Cup and the Scottish Cup.

== Summary ==
Annan finished fourth in the Third Division, entering the play-offs losing 4-3 to Albion Rovers on aggregate in the final. They reached the first round of the Challenge Cup, the first round of the League Cup and the third round of the Scottish Cup.

== Results and fixtures ==
Win Draw Loss

=== Scottish Third Division ===
7 August 2010 Scottish Third Division	Annan Athletic	3 – 1	East Stirlingshire	Galabank
	Jack 16'; Halsman 18'; Sloan 20'	BBC Report	Summersgill 38' (Own goal)	Attendance: 539; Referee: Roache

14 August 2010 Scottish Third Division	Arbroath	0 – 2	Annan Athletic	Gayfield Park
		BBC Report	Cox 38'; Neilson 40'	Attendance: 506; Referee: Clancy

21 August 2010 Scottish Third Division	Annan Athletic	2 – 2	Stranraer	Galabank
	Harty 13'; Halsman 67'	BBC Report	Malcolm 3'; Bouadji 7'	Attendance: 671; Referee: Robertson

28 August 2010 Scottish Third Division	Montrose	1 – 1	Annan Athletic	Links Park
	Tosh 16' (Penalty)	SFL Report	Gilfillan 66'	Attendance: 332; Referee: Somers

11 September 2010 Scottish Third Division	Annan Athletic	0 – 1	Elgin City	Galabank
		BBC Report	Nicolson 9'; Nicolson (red card) 55'	Attendance: 505; Referee: Anderson

18 September 2010 Scottish Third Division	Clyde	0 – 2	Annan Athletic	Broadwood
		BBC Report	Gilfillan 6'; Felvus 72'	Attendance: 1,043; Referee: Winter

25 September 2010 Scottish Third Division	Annan Athletic	2 – 1	Queen's Park	Galabank
	Harty 33'; Cox 83'	BBC Report	Smith 62'	Attendance: 546; Referee: Colvin

2 October 2010 Scottish Third Division	Berwick Rangers	2 – 2	Annan Athletic	Shielfield Park
	Gribben 1', 30'; Greenhill (yellow card) 57' (red card)	BBC Report	Sloan 25'; Steele 92'	Attendance: 448; Referee: Smith

16 October 2010 Scottish Third Division	Annan Athletic	4 – 1	Albion Rovers	Galabank
	Halsman 42', 56'; Gilfillan 70'; Jardine 80'	BBC Report	Canning 67'	Attendance: 517; Referee: Nicholls

6 November 2010 Scottish Third Division	Elgin City	2 – 0	Annan Athletic	Borough Briggs
	Cameron 5'; Crooks 11'	BBC Report		Attendance: 507; Referee: Robertson

9 November 2010 Scottish Third Division	Annan Athletic	2 – 2	Montrose	Galabank
	Cox 25'; Muirhead 43'	BBC Report	Campbell 41'; Tosh 60'	Attendance: 377; Referee: Hilland

13 November 2010 Scottish Third Division	Stranraer	2 – 2	Annan Athletic	Stair Park
	Winter 76'; Moore 82'	BBC Report	O'Connor 45'; Harty 48'	Attendance: 463; Referee: Roache

15 January 2011 Scottish Third Division	Annan Athletic	2 – 2	Elgin City	Galabank
	Gilfillan 6'; Muirhead (yellow card) 36' (red card); Macfarlane 95'	BBC Report	Crooks 3', 11'	Attendance: 311; Referee: Hilland

22 January 2011 Scottish Third Division	Montrose	0 – 1	Annan Athletic	Links Park
		BBC Report	Neilson 91'	Attendance: 335; Referee: Robertson

25 January 2011 Scottish Third Division	Albion Rovers	0 – 0	Annan Athletic	Cliftonhill
		BBC Report		Attendance: 323; Referee: Roache

1 February 2011 Scottish Third Division	Annan Athletic	1 – 2	Queen's Park	Galabank
	Sloan 55'	SFL Report	Daly 67'; Murray 69'	Attendance: 293; Referee: Somers

5 February 2011 Scottish Third Division	Clyde	0 – 2	Annan Athletic	Broadwood
		SFL Report	O'Connor 21'; Harty 74'	Attendance: 568; Referee: Nicholls

12 February 2011 Scottish Third Division	Berwick Rangers	2 – 3	Annan Athletic	Shielfield Park
	Gray 25'; Little 43'	BBC Report	Harty 27', 78' (Penalty); Muirhead 57'	Attendance: 311; Referee: Clancy

15 February 2011 Scottish Third Division	Annan Athletic	1 – 2	Arbroath	Galabank
	MacBeth (yellow card) 70' (red card); Griffin 81' (Own goal)	BBC Report	McGowan 49'; Wedderburn 53'; Malcolm (red card) 58'; Wedderburn (red card) 76'	Attendance: 304; Referee: Finnie

19 February 2011 Scottish Third Division	Annan Athletic	2 – 2	Albion Rovers	Galabank
	Harty 57', 77'; Aitken (yellow card) 92' (red card)	BBC Report	Lawless 14'; Boyle 94'	Attendance: 467; Referee: O'Reilly

22 February 2011 Scottish Third Division	Queen's Park	3 – 0	Annan Athletic	Hampden Park
	Daly 27'; Longworth 59'; Smith 85'	BBC Report		Attendance: 327; Referee: Anderson

26 February 2011 Scottish Third Division	Annan Athletic	2 – 1	East Stirlingshire	Galabank
	Gilfillan 67'; Muirhead (red card) 60'; Neilson 76'	BBC Report	Cawley 59'	Attendance: 402; Referee: Madden

1 March 2011 Scottish Third Division	Annan Athletic	1 – 1	Berwick Rangers	Galabank
	Neilson 35'	BBC Report	Gribben 74'	Attendance: 309; Referee: Beaton

5 March 2011 Scottish Third Division	Arbroath	2 – 1	Annan Athletic	Gayfield Park
	Doris 25'; Swankie 49'	BBC Report	Gilfillan 53'	Attendance: 575; Referee: Beaton

8 March 2011 Scottish Third Division	Annan Athletic	2 – 1	Stranraer	Galabank
	O'Connor 26'; Harty 41'	BBC Report	Murphy 25'; Moore (red card) 29'	Attendance: 307; Referee: Muir

12 March 2011 Scottish Third Division	Elgin City	2 – 3	Annan Athletic	Borough Briggs
	Gormley 65'; Gunn 69'	BBC Report	O'Connor 12'; Neilson 39'; Aitken (red card) 48'; Dempsie 84' (Own goal)	Attendance: 511; Referee: Hilland

15 March 2011 Scottish Third Division	East Stirlingshire	1 – 5	Annan Athletic	Ochilview Park
	Johnston 64'	SFL Report	Harty 2'; Cox 15'; O'Connor 29'; Docherty 48'; Bell 92'	Attendance: 178; Referee: Colvin

19 March 2011 Scottish Third Division	Annan Athletic	2 – 1	Montrose	Galabank
	Harty 46', 52' (Penalty)	SFL Report	Tosh 21'; Campbell (red card) 50'	Attendance: 473; Referee: Law

26 March 2011 Scottish Third Division	Queen's Park	0 – 1	Annan Athletic	Hampden Park
		BBC Report	Sloan 16'	Attendance: 561; Referee: Robertson

29 March 2011 Scottish Third Division	Annan Athletic	0 – 2	Clyde	Galabank
		BBC Report	McCluskey 18'; Scullion 65'	Attendance: 465; Referee: Norris

2 April 2011 Scottish Third Division	Annan Athletic	1 – 0	Clyde	Galabank
	Harty 36'	BBC Report		Attendance: 585; Referee: Aitken

9 April 2011 Scottish Third Division	Albion Rovers	0 – 0	Annan Athletic	Cliftonhill
		BBC Report		Attendance: 396; Referee: Watters

16 April 2011 Scottish Third Division	Annan Athletic	2 – 3	Berwick Rangers	Galabank
	Gilfillan 64'; O'Connor 80'	BBC Report	Gray 17', 44'; Currie 53'	Attendance: 515; Referee: O'Reilly

23 April 2011 Scottish Third Division	Stranraer	1 – 1	Annan Athletic	Stair Park
	Winter 7'	BBC Report	Harty 59'	Attendance: 493; Referee: Richmond

30 April 2011 Scottish Third Division	Annan Athletic	3 – 0	Arbroath	Galabank
	O'Connor 23', 66'; Sloan 72'	BBC Report		Attendance: 651; Referee: Roache

7 May 2011 Scottish Third Division	East Stirlingshire	2 – 0	Annan Athletic	Ochilview Park
	Cawley 42', 92'	SFL Report		Attendance: 322; Referee: Clancy

=== Second Division play-offs ===
11 May 2011 Scottish Second Division play-offs SF R1	Annan Athletic	2 – 1	Alloa Athletic	Galabank
19:45	Muirhead 14'; Steele 60'	BBC Report	Scott 65'	Attendance: 621; Referee: Charleston

14 May 2011 Scottish Second Division play-offs SF R2	Alloa Athletic	0 – 0	Annan Athletic	Recreation Park
15:00		BBC Report		Attendance: 622; Referee: Salmond

18 May 2011 Scottish Second Division play-offs Final R1	Albion Rovers	3 – 1	Annan Athletic	Cliftonhill
19:45	Love 15', 67', 76'	BBC Report	Harty 42'	Attendance: 1,014; Referee: Muir

22 May 2011 Scottish Second Division play-offs Final R2	Annan Athletic	2 – 1	Albion Rovers	Galabank
15:00	Gilfillan 51', 65'; Gilfillan (red card) 90'	BBC Report	Donnelly 24'	Attendance: 1,165; Referee: McKendrick

=== Scottish Challenge Cup ===
24 July 2010 Scottish Challenge Cup round 1	Stenhousemuir	3 – 2	Annan Athletic	Ochilview Park
	Watson 29' (o.g.); Williams 43', 45'	BBC Report	Halsman 89'; Muirhead 90+1'	Attendance: 223; Referee: Steven McLean

=== Scottish League Cup ===
31 July 2010 Scottish League Cup round 1	Annan Athletic	0 – 1	Partick Thistle	Galabank
		BBC Report	Donnelly 84'	Attendance: 1,025; Referee: Richmond

=== Scottish Cup ===
23 October 2010 Scottish Cup round 2	Preston Athletic	0 – 0	Annan Athletic	Pennypit Park
		ESPN Report		Attendance: 350; Referee: Robertson

30 October 2010 Scottish Cup round 2 replay	Annan Athletic	5 – 0	Preston Athletic	Galabank
	Macbeth 4'; Harty 15', 21'; Halsman 45+1'; Amaya 87'	ESPN Report		Attendance: 426; Referee: Robertson

20 November 2010 Scottish Cup round 3	Brechin City	2 – 2	Annan Athletic	Glebe Park
	McKenna 32', 57'	ESPN Report	Muirhead 52'; Gilfillan 68'	Attendance: 402; Referee: Madden

4 January 2011 Scottish Cup round 3 replay	Annan Athletic	2 – 5	Brechin City	Galabank
	Gilfillan 6'; Aitken 55'	ESPN Report	McAllister 2', 83'; Molloy 23'; McKenna 37'; Byers 41'	Attendance: 512; Referee: Madden

== Player statistics ==
=== Squad ===
No.	Pos	Nat	Player	Total		Third Division		Other^{[a]}		League Cup		Scottish Cup	
No.	Pos	Nat	Player	Apps	Goals	Apps	Goals	Apps	Goals	Apps	Goals	Apps	Goals
	GK	(England) ENG	Jonny Jamieson	13	0	8+0	0	0+1	0	0+0	0	4+0	0
	GK	(Scotland) SCO	Alex Mitchell	1	0	1+0	0	0+0	0	0+0	0	0+0	0
	GK	(England) ENG	Craig Summersgill	33	0	27+0	0	5+0	0	1+0	0	0+0	0
	DF	(Scotland) SCO	Andy Aitken	40	1	29+1	0	5+0	0	1+0	0	4+0	1
	DF	(Scotland) SCO	Mark Docherty	22	1	15+3	1	4+0	0	0+0	0	0+0	0
	DF	(Scotland) SCO	Jordan Halsman	19	6	13+0	4	0+1	1	1+0	0	4+0	1
	DF	(Scotland) SCO	John MacBeth	34	1	23+2	0	1+3	0	1+0	0	4+0	1
	DF	(Scotland) SCO	Neil Macfarlane	19	1	10+5	1	3+1	0	0+0	0	0+0	0
	DF	(Scotland) SCO	Aaron Muirhead	41	5	28+3	2	5+0	2	1+0	0	4+0	1
	DF	(Scotland) SCO	Kevin Neilson	43	5	34+1	5	4+0	0	1+0	0	3+0	0
	DF	(Scotland) SCO	John Watson	1	0	0+1	0	0+0	0	0+0	0	0+0	0
	DF	(Scotland) SCO	Peter Watson	25	0	18+1	0	4+1	0	0+0	0	0+1	0
	MF	(Northern Ireland) NIR	Bryan Gilfillan	42	11	30+2	7	3+2	2	1+0	0	4+0	2
	MF	(Scotland) SCO	Mike Jack	6	1	4+1	1	0+0	0	0+1	0	0+0	0
	MF	(Scotland) SCO	Chris Jardine	32	1	21+5	1	1+0	0	1+0	0	3+1	0
	MF	(Scotland) SCO	Steven Lawless	2	0	0+0	0	0+1	0	0+1	0	0+0	0
	MF	(Scotland) SCO	Patrick Slattery	1	0	0+1	0	0+0	0	0+0	0	0+0	0
	MF	(Scotland) SCO	Steven Sloan	46	5	31+5	5	5+0	0	1+0	0	4+0	0
	MF	(Scotland) SCO	Jack Steele	35	2	15+12	1	4+0	1	0+0	0	2+2	0
	FW	(Spain) ESP	Javier Amaya	4	1	0+2	0	0+0	0	0+0	0	0+2	1
	FW	(Scotland) SCO	Jordan Atkinson	1	0	0+1	0	0+0	0	0+0	0	0+0	0
	FW	(Scotland) SCO	Graeme Bell	14	1	2+12	1	0+0	0	0+0	0	0+0	0
	FW	(Scotland) SCO	Aaron Connelly	2	0	0+2	0	0+0	0	0+0	0	0+0	0
	FW	(Scotland) SCO	David Cox	37	4	31+1	4	0+0	0	0+1	0	4+0	0
	FW	(Scotland) SCO	Brian Felvus	20	1	2+13	1	0+3	0	0+0	0	0+2	0
	FW	(Scotland) SCO	Ian Harty	41	17	30+1	14	5+0	1	1+0	0	4+0	2
	FW	(England) ENG	Sean O'Connor	26	8	22+0	8	4+0	0	0+0	0	0+0	0
	FW	(Scotland) SCO	Lewis Sloan	8	0	1+4	0	1+0	0	0+0	0	0+2	0
	FW	(Scotland) SCO	Patrick Walker	9	0	1+6	0	1+0	0	1+0	0	0+0	0

a. Includes other competitive competitions, including playoffs and the Scottish Challenge Cup.

== League table ==
Pos	Team	Pld	W	D	L	GF	GA	GD	Pts	Promotion or qualification
2	Albion Rovers (O, P)	36	17	10	9	56	40	+16	61	Qualification for the Second Division Play-offs
3	Queen's Park	36	18	5	13	57	43	+14	59	Qualification for the Second Division Play-offs
4	Annan Athletic	36	16	11	9	58	45	+13	59	Qualification for the Second Division Play-offs
5	Stranraer	36	15	12	9	72	57	+15	57	
6	Berwick Rangers	36	12	13	11	62	56	+6	49	

Source: SPFL
Rules for classification: 1) points; 2) goal difference; 3) number of goals scored.
(O) Play-off winners; (P) Promoted

== See also ==
- List of Annan Athletic F.C. seasons
