= 2011–12 Annan Athletic F.C. season =

Annan Athletic
2011–12 season
- Manager: Harry Cairney
- Stadium: Galabank
- Scottish Third Division: Sixth
- Challenge Cup: Semi-final
- League Cup: First round
- Scottish Cup: Third round
- Top goalscorer: League: Scott Gibson (7); Aaron Muirhead (7); Sean O'Connor (7); All: Aaron Muirhead (9)
- Highest home attendance: 644 vs. Clyde, 27 August 2011
- Lowest home attendance: 304vs. Stranraer, 6 December 2011

The 2011–12 season was Annan Athletic's fourth consecutive season in the Scottish Third Division, having been admitted to the Scottish Football League at the start of the 2008–09 season. Annan also competed in the Challenge Cup, League Cup and Scottish Cup.

== Summary ==
Annan finished sixth in the Third Division. They reached the semi-final of the Challenge Cup, the first round of the League Cup and the third round of the Scottish Cup.

== Results & fixtures ==
Win Draw Loss Postponed

=== Third Division ===
6 August 2011 Scottish Third Division	Annan Athletic	5–2	Queen's Park	Galabank
15:00	Cox 32'; Bell 45'; Gibson 59', 65'; Sloan 18', 27'	Annan Athletic Report	Smith	Attendance: 511; Referee: Clancy

13 August 2011 Scottish Third Division	Peterhead	2–3	Annan Athletic	Balmoor Stadium
15:00	Deasley 8'; McAllister 41'	Annan Athletic Report	McKechnie 19', 50'; Harty 73' (pen.)	Attendance: 448; Referee: Anderson

20 August 2011 Scottish Third Division	Annan Athletic	2–0	Alloa Athletic	Galabank
15:00	Harty 33'; Cox 64'	Annan Athletic Report		Attendance: 516; Referee: Collum

27 August 2011 Scottish Third Division	Annan Athletic	1–0	Clyde	Galabank
15:00	Sloan 29'	BBC Report		Attendance: 644; Referee: Graham

10 September 2011 Scottish Third Division	Stranraer	4–2	Annan Athletic	Stair Park
	Aitken 29', 83' (pen.); McColm 55', 71'	BBC Report	Gibson 44'; Muirhead 64' (pen.)	Attendance: 396; Referee: Robertson

17 September 2011 Scottish Third Division	Montrose	2–3	Annan Athletic	Links Park
15:00	Boyle 13', 44'	BBC Report	Gibson 16', 84'; McKechnie 90'	Attendance: 308; Referee: Beaton

24 September 2011 Scottish Third Division	Annan Athletic	3–0	East Stirlingshire	Galabank
15:00	Sloan 10'; Cox 25', 33'	BBC Report		Attendance: 511; Referee: Conroy

1 October 2011 Scottish Third Division	Berwick Rangers	0–1	Annan Athletic	Shielfield Park
	Gribben (red card) 81'	BBC Report	Gibson 71'	Attendance: 412; Referee: Aitken

15 October 2011 Scottish Third Division	Annan Athletic	1–1	Elgin City	Galabank
15:00	Gibson 74'	SFL Report	Cameron 4'	Attendance: 417; Referee: Graham

29 October 2011 Scottish Third Division	Annan Athletic	P – P	Peterhead	Galabank
15:00

5 November 2011 Scottish Third Division	Queen's Park	0–0	Annan Athletic	Hampden Park
15:00		SFL Report		Attendance: 502; Referee: Des Roache

8 November 2011 Scottish Third Division	Annan Athletic	2–0	Peterhead	Galabank
19:30	Muirhead 10' (Penalty); Steele 11'	SFL Report		Attendance: 388; Referee: Robertson

12 November 2011 Scottish Third Division	Clyde	0–0	Annan Athletic	Broadwood Stadium
15:00	McDonald (yellow card) 69' (red card)	SFL Report	Watson (yellow card) 78' (red card)	Attendance: 668; Referee: Aitken

26 November 2011 Scottish Third Division	Annan Athletic	P – P	Stranraer	Galabank
15:00

3 December 2011 Scottish Third Division	East Stirlingshire	1–0	Annan Athletic	Ochilview Park
19:45	Coyne 39'	Annan Report		Attendance: 215; Referee: Robertson

6 December 2011 Scottish Third Division	Annan Athletic	0–3	Stranraer	Galabank
19:30		Report	McColm 18'; Grehan 31'; Stirling 79'	Attendance: 304; Referee: Hilland

10 December 2011 Scottish Third Division	Annan Athletic	2–1	Montrose	Galabank
15:00	O'Connor 33', 35'; Muirhead (red card) 53'	Report	Winter 54' (Penalty)	Attendance: 402; Referee: Aitken

17 December 2011 Scottish Third Division	Elgin City	P – P	Annan Athletic	Stair Park
15:00		Postponements

24 December 2011 Scottish Third Division	Annan Athletic	2–2	Berwick Rangers	Galabank
15:00	Watson 18'; Harty 41'; McGowan (red card) 53'	Report	Gibson 77' (Own Goal); Gribben 82'; Notman (yellow card) 91' (red card)	Attendance: 598; Referee: Cook

31 December 2011 Scottish Third Division	Stranraer	4–2	Annan Athletic	Stair Park
15:00	Winter 41', 69'; Stirling 61' (Penalty); Malcolm 88'	SFL Report	Harty 36' (Penalty); O'Connor 59'	Attendance: 592; Referee: Graham

7 January 2012 Scottish Third Division	Annan Athletic	1–0	Clyde	Galabank
15:00	O'Connor 64'	Report		Attendance: 505; Referee: Robertson

14 January 2012 Scottish Third Division	Alloa Athletic	1–0	Annan Athletic	Recreation Park
	May 30'	SFL Report		Attendance: 635; Referee: Aitken

21 January 2012 Scottish Third Division	Annan Athletic	2–3	Queen's Park	Galabank
15:00	Winters 2'; O'Connor 90'	SFL Report	McBride 19' (Penalty), 51' (Penalty); Smith 88'	Attendance: 507; Referee: Dallas

28 January 2012 Scottish Third Division	Annan Athletic	2 – 2	East Stirlingshire	Galabank
15:00	Winters 5'; Steele 57'	SFL Report	Maxwell 12'; Lurinsky 24'	Attendance: 401; Referee: Cook

4 February 2012 Scottish Third Division	Montrose	1–1	Annan Athletic	Links Park
15:00	Winter 45'; Cameron (red card) 77'	SFL Report	Muirhead 78' (Penalty)	Attendance: 246; Referee: Robertson

11 February 2012 Scottish Third Division	Annan Athletic	1 – 1	Elgin City	Galabank
15:00	Steele 17'	SFL Report	Niven 29'; Durnan (red card) 89'	Attendance: 413; Referee: Robertson

18 February 2012 Scottish Third Division	Berwick Rangers	2–3	Annan Athletic	Shielfield Park
15:00	Gribben 80'; Walker (yellow card) 86' (red card)	SFL Report	Cox 19'; Winters 20'; O'Connor 59'	Attendance: 389; Referee: Barry Cook

25 February 2012 Scottish Third Division	Peterhead	3–2	Annan Athletic	Balmoor Stadium
15:00	Tully 55'; Bavidge 60', 79'; McAllister (yellow card) 81' (red card)	SFL Report	Muirhead 15' (Penalty), 45'	Attendance: 453; Referee: Hilland

3 March 2012 Scottish Third Division	Annan Athletic	1 – 2	Alloa Athletic	Galabank
15:00	O'Connor 33'	SFL Report	Young 7'; May 77'	Attendance: 642; Referee: Graham

6 March 2012 Scottish Third Division	Elgin City	3–0	Annan Athletic	Borough Briggs
19:45	Gunn 28'; Muirhead 35' (o.g.); Niven 78'	SFL Report	McKechnie (red card) 84'	Attendance: 588; Referee: Robertson

10 March 2012 Scottish Third Division	Annan Athletic	1 – 3	Stranraer	Galabank
15:00	Swinglehurst 4'	SFL Report	Aitken 13' (Penalty); McKeown 45+2'; Malcolm 87'	Attendance: 491; Referee: Robertson

17 March 2012 Scottish Third Division	Clyde	1–1	Annan Athletic	Broadwood Stadium
15:00	Pollock 26'	SFL Report	Winters 70'; Cox (red card) 75'	Attendance: 503; Referee: McDermott

24 March 2012 Scottish Third Division	Annan Athletic	1 – 2	Montrose	Galabank
15:00	Muirhead 27' (Penalty)	SFL Report	Wood 5'; Winter 43' (Penalty)	Attendance: 418; Referee: Aitken

31 March 2012 Scottish Third Division	East Stirlingshire	0–4	Annan Athletic	Ochilview Park
15:00		SFL Report	Bell 5'; McGowan 62'; Steele 70'; Underwood 83'	Attendance: 235; Referee: Hilland

7 April 2012 Scottish Third Division	Annan Athletic	1 – 1	Berwick Rangers	Galabank
15:00	Muirhead 24'	SFL Report	Townsley (yellow card) 50' (red card); Forster 72'	Attendance: 430; Referee: Steven

14 April 2012 Scottish Third Division	Elgin City	1 – 2	Annan Athletic	Borough Briggs
15:00	Millar 6'; Leslie (yellow card) 31' (yellow-red card) 45'	Report	McKechnie 26', 38'	Attendance: 715; Referee: Roache

14 April 2012 Scottish Third Division	Elgin City	1–2	Annan Athletic	Borough Briggs
15:00	Millar 6'; Leslie (yellow card) 45' (red card)	SFL Report	McKechnie 26', 38'	Attendance: 715; Referee: Roache

21 April 2012 Scottish Third Division	Queen's Park	2–0	Annan Athletic	Hampden Park
15:00	Longworth 30'; Watt 71'	SFL Report		Attendance: 623; Referee: Hilland

28 April 2012 Scottish Third Division	Annan Athletic	0 – 3	Peterhead	Galabank
15:00		SFL Report	Deasley 21'; MacDonald 49'; McAllister 84'	Attendance: 408; Referee: Anderson

5 May 2012 Scottish Third Division	Alloa Athletic	0–1	Annan Athletic	Recreation Park
15:00	May 87'	SFL Report	Bell 31'	Attendance: 2,551; Referee: Salmond

=== Challenge Cup ===
23 July 2011 Challenge Cup Rd 1	Albion Rovers	0–2	Annan Athletic	Cliftonhill
		BBC Report	Cox 29'; Harty 81'	Attendance: 247; Referee: Des Roache

9 August 2011 Challenge Cup Rd 2	Annan Athletic	4–2	Peterhead	Galabank
	Harty 30', 48', 87'; Muirhead 31'	BBC Report	Redman 49'; McAllister 75' (pen.)	Attendance: 359; Referee: Stephen Finnie

4 September 2011 Challenge Cup QF	Ayr United	0–1	Annan Athletic	Somerset Park
15:00		BBC Report	Cox 58'	Attendance: 1,232; Referee: Charleston

9 October 2011 Challenge Cup SF	Annan Athletic	0–3	Falkirk	Galabank
15:00		BBC Report	Millar 10'; El Alagui 25', 42'	Attendance: 1,575; Referee: Salmond

=== League Cup ===
30 July 2011 Scottish League Cup Rd 1	Annan Athletic	1–2	Dunfermline Athletic	Galabank
	Cox 21'	BBC Report	Barrowman 18'; Kirk 51'	Attendance: 767; Referee: Richmond

=== Scottish Cup ===
22 October 2011 Round 2	Alloa Athletic	2 – 2	Annan Athletic	Recreation Park
15:00	Cawley 16'; Masterton 68'	Sky Report	Cox 36'; Watson 54'	Referee: Brines

29 October 2011 Round 2 Replay	Annan Athletic	2–0	Alloa Athletic	Galabank
15:00	Gilfillan 28'; Muirhead 85'	Sky Report		Attendance: 502; Referee: Brines

19 November 2011 Round 3	Stenhousemuir	4–0	Annan Athletic	Ochilview Park
15:00	Kean 9'; Rodgers 17', 22', 37'	BBC Report		Attendance: 602; Referee: McKendrick

== Player statistics ==
=== Squad ===
Last updated 5 May 2012

No.	Pos	Nat	Player	Total		Third Division		Scottish Cup		League Cup		Challenge Cup	
No.	Pos	Nat	Player	Apps	Goals	Apps	Goals	Apps	Goals	Apps	Goals	Apps	Goals
	GK	(England) ENG	Jonny Jamieson	0	0	0	0	0	0	0	0	0	0
	GK	(Scotland) SCO	Ross Hyslop	0	0	0	0	0	0	0	0	0	0
	GK	(Scotland) SCO	Alex Mitchell	27	0	25	0	1	0	0	0	1	0
	GK	(England) ENG	Craig Summersgill	17	0	11	0	2	0	1	0	3	0
	DF	(Scotland) SCO	Andy Aitken	5	0	3	0	0	0	1	0	1	0
	DF	(Scotland) SCO	John MacBeth	20	0	19	0	0	0	0	0	1	0
	DF	(Scotland) SCO	Scott Gibson	30	7	23	7	2	0	1	0	4	0
	DF	(Scotland) SCO	Michael McGowan	43	1	35	1	3	0	1	0	4	0
	DF	(Scotland) SCO	Aaron Muirhead	34	9	27	7	3	1	1	0	3	1
	DF	(Scotland) SCO	Kevin Neilson	8	0	5	0	2	0	0	0	1	0
	DF	(Scotland) SCO	Peter Watson	42	1	34	1	3	0	1	0	4	0
	DF	(Scotland) SCO	Sean Currie	1	0	0	0	1	0	0	0	0	0
	DF	(England) ENG	Steven Swinglehurst	14	1	14	1	0	0	0	0	0	0
	DF	(Scotland) SCO	Lee Underwood	1	1	1	1	0	0	0	0	0	0
	MF	(Northern Ireland) NIR	Bryan Gilfillan	27	1	20	0	3	1	1	0	3	0
	MF	(Scotland) SCO	Ryan Holms	2	0	1	0	0	0	1	0	0	0
	MF	(Scotland) SCO	Chris Jardine	34	0	29	0	3	0	0	0	2	0
	MF	(Scotland) SCO	Neil MacFarlane	0	0	0	0	0	0	0	0	0	0
	MF	(Scotland) SCO	Jordan McKechnie	35	5	27	5	3	0	1	0	4	0
	MF	(Scotland) SCO	Steven Sloan	44	3	36	3	3	0	1	0	4	0
	MF	(Scotland) SCO	Jack Steele	35	4	28	4	2	0	1	0	4	0
	MF	(Scotland) SCO	Gary Wild	4	0	3	0	1	0	0	0	0	0
	MF	(Scotland) SCO	Daniel Mitchell	14	0	14	0	0	0	0	0	0	0
	MF	(Northern Ireland) NIR	Ben McKenna	14	0	14	0	0	0	0	0	0	0
	FW	(Scotland) SCO	Jordan Atkinson	3	0	3	0	0	0	0	0	0	0
	FW	(Scotland) SCO	Graeme Bell	29	3	21	3	3	0	1	0	4	0
	FW	(Scotland) SCO	David Cox	39	8	31	5	3	0	1	1	4	2
	FW	(Scotland) SCO	Bryan Felvus	0	0	0	0	0	0	0	0	0	0
	FW	(Scotland) SCO	Ian Harty	18	8	13	4	0	0	1	0	4	4
	FW	(England) ENG	Sean O'Connor	34	7	27	7	2	0	1	0	4	0
	FW	(Scotland) SCO	David Winters	17	4	17	4	0	0	0	0	0	0

=== Disciplinary record ===
Includes all competitive matches.

Last updated 5 May 2012

Nation	Position	Name	Second Division		Scottish Cup		League Cup		Challenge Cup		Total	
Nation	Position	Name	Yellow card	Red card	Yellow card	Red card	Yellow card	Red card	Yellow card	Red card	Yellow card	Red card
(England)	GK	Jonny Jamieson	0	0	0	0	0	0	0	0	0	0
(Scotland)	GK	Ross Hyslop	0	0	0	0	0	0	0	0	0	0
(Scotland)	GK	Alex Mitchell	3	0	0	0	0	0	0	0	3	0
(England)	GK	Craig Summersgill	0	0	0	0	0	0	0	0	0	0
(Scotland)	DF	Andy Aitken	0	0	0	0	0	0	0	0	0	0
(Scotland)	DF	John MacBeth	0	0	0	0	0	0	0	0	0	0
(Scotland)	DF	Scott Gibson	2	1	0	0	0	0	0	0	2	1
(Scotland)	DF	Michael McGowan	3	1	0	0	0	0	0	0	3	1
(Scotland)	DF	Aaron Muirhead	7	1	0	0	0	0	0	0	7	1
(Scotland)	DF	Kevin Neilson	0	0	0	0	0	0	0	0	0	0
(Scotland)	DF	Peter Watson	12	1	0	0	1	0	0	0	13	1
(Scotland)	DF	Sean Currie	0	0	0	0	0	0	0	0	0	0
(Scotland)	DF	Steven Swinglehurst	4	0	0	0	0	0	0	0	4	0
(Northern Ireland)	MF	Bryan Gilfillan	3	0	0	0	0	0	0	0	3	0
(Scotland)	MF	Ryan Holms	0	0	0	0	0	0	0	0	0	0
(Scotland)	MF	Chris Jardine	2	0	0	0	0	0	0	0	2	0
(Scotland)	MF	Neil MacFarlane	0	0	0	0	0	0	0	0	0	0
(Scotland)	MF	Jordan McKechnie	3	1	1	0	0	0	1	0	4	1
(Scotland)	MF	Steven Sloan	2	0	0	0	0	0	0	0	2	0
(Scotland)	MF	Jack Steele	4	0	0	0	0	0	1	0	5	0
(Scotland)	MF	Gary Wild	1	0	0	0	0	0	0	0	1	0
(Scotland)	MF	Daniel Mitchell	1	0	0	0	0	0	0	0	1	0
(Northern Ireland)	MF	Ben McKenna	2	0	0	0	0	0	0	0	2	0
(Scotland)	FW	Graeme Bell	0	0	0	0	0	0	0	0	0	0
(Scotland)	FW	David Cox	7	1	2	0	0	0	0	0	8	1
(Scotland)	FW	Bryan Felvus	0	0	0	0	0	0	0	0	0	0
(Scotland)	FW	Ian Harty	1	0	0	0	0	0	0	0	1	0
(England)	FW	Sean O'Connor	0	0	0	0	0	0	0	0	0	0
(Scotland)	FW	David Winters	0	0	0	0	0	0	0	0	0	0

=== Awards ===
Last updated 21 December 2011

Nation	Name	Award	Month
(Scotland)	Harry Cairney	Third Division Manager of the Month	August

== League table ==
Pos	Team	Pld	W	D	L	GF	GA	GD	Pts	Promotion or qualification
4	Elgin City	36	16	9	11	68	60	+8	57	Qualification for the Second Division Play-offs
5	Peterhead	36	15	6	15	51	53	−2	51	
6	Annan Athletic	36	13	10	13	53	53	0	49	
7	Berwick Rangers	36	12	12	12	61	58	+3	48	
8	Montrose	36	11	5	20	58	75	−17	38	

Source: SPFL Archive
Rules for classification: 1) points; 2) goal difference; 3) number of goals scored.

== Transfers ==
=== Players in ===
Player	From	Fee
(Scotland) Jordan McKechnie	(Scotland) Raith Rovers	Free
(Scotland) Michael McGowan	(Scotland) Albion Rovers	Free
(Scotland) Scott Gibson	(Scotland) Musselburgh Athletic	Free
(Scotland) Ross Hyslop	(Scotland) Queen of the South	Free
(Scotland) Ryan Holms	(Scotland) Queens Park	Free
(Scotland) Gary Wild	(Scotland) Cumnock Juniors	Free
(Scotland) Danny Mitchell	(Scotland) Stranraer	Free
(Northern Ireland) Ben McKenna	(England) Carlisle United	Loan
(England) Steven Swinglehurst	(England) Carlisle United	Loan
(Scotland) David Winters	(Scotland) Dumbarton	Free

=== Players out ===
Player	To	Fee
(Scotland) Ryan Holms	(Scotland) Girvan	Free
(Scotland) Bryan Felvus	(Scotland) Lanark United	Free
(Scotland) Ross Hyslop	(Scotland) Lanark United	Loan
(Scotland) Andy Aitken		Retired
(Scotland) Greg Kelly	Free agent	Free
(England) Mike Jack	Free agent	Free
(Scotland) Neil MacFarlane		Retired
(Scotland) John MacBeth	(Scotland) Dalbeattie Star	Loan
(Scotland) Kevin Neilson	Free agent	Free
(Scotland) Scott Gibson	(Scotland) Musselburgh Athletic	Loan

== See also ==
- List of Annan Athletic F.C. seasons
