= Jack McMillan (Scottish footballer) =

Scottish footballer

Personal information
- Full name: Jack McMillan
- Date of birth: 18 December 1997 (age 28)
- Place of birth: Livingston, Scotland
- Height: 1.83 m (6 ft 0 in)
- Position: Right back

Team information
- Current team: Falkirk
- Number: 4

Youth career
- –2016: Motherwell

Senior career*
Years	Team	Apps	(Gls)
2016–2018	Motherwell	14	(0)
2017–2018	→ Livingston (loan)	6	(1)
2018–2022	Livingston	59	(2)
2019	→ Partick Thistle (loan)	13	(0)
2022–2024	Partick Thistle	64	(3)
2024–2026	Exeter City	84	(3)
2026–	Falkirk	7	(0)
- * Club domestic league appearances and goals as of 10:57, 12 November 2026 (UTC)

Jack McMillan (born 18 December 1997) is a Scottish footballer who plays as a defender for Scottish Premiership club Falkirk. He has previously played for Partick Thistle, Motherwell, Livingston and Exeter City.

== Career ==
=== Motherwell ===
McMillan is a product of the Motherwell Academy. He made his debut for Motherwell on 15 October 2016, in a 2–0 defeat against Celtic.

On 2 December 2016, McMillan signed a new two-and-a-half-year deal with Motherwell.

On 31 August 2017, McMillan moved on loan to Livingston until January 2018.

=== Livingston ===
He then made the move permanent on 19 January 2018, signing until summer 2019. McMillan moved on loan to Partick Thistle in January 2019. He made 16 appearances for the Jags in all competitions in which he featured predominantly as part of a back three.

=== Partick Thistle return ===
Three years after his initial loan at the club, on 1 June 2022, McMillan signed a two-year deal with Partick Thistle. McMillan was offered a new contract with Partick Thistle but opted to reject it, resulting in his departure from the club at the end of the 2023–24 season.

=== Exeter City ===
On 20 June 2024, McMillan made his first foray into English football by signing a two-year deal with EFL League One side Exeter City.The transfer reunited McMillan with manager Gary Caldwell who had originally signed him to Partick Thistle during his initial loan spell.

== Career statistics ==
As of match played 15 November 2025

Appearances and goals by club, season and competition
Club	Season	League			National cup (Note: Includes Scottish Cup and FA Cup)		League cup (Note: Includes Scottish League Cup and EFL Cup)		Other		Total	
Club	Season	Division	Apps	Goals	Apps	Goals	Apps	Goals	Apps	Goals	Apps	Goals
Motherwell U20	2016–17	—			—		—		2 (Note: Appearance(s) in Scottish Challenge Cup)	0	2	0
Motherwell U20	2017–18	—			—		—		2	0	2	0
Motherwell U20	Total		—		—		—		4	0	4	0
Motherwell	2016–17	Scottish Premiership	14	0	1	0	0	0	—		15	0
Motherwell	2017–18	Scottish Premiership	0	0	0	0	1	0	—		1	0
Motherwell	Total		14	0	1	0	1	0	—		16	0
Livingston (loan)	2017–18	Scottish Championship	6	1	0	0	0	0	0	0	6	1
Livingston	2017–18	Scottish Championship	7	0	1	0	—		1 (Note: Appearance(s) in Scottish Premiership play-offs)	0	9	0
Livingston	2018–19	Scottish Premiership	7	1	0	0	4	1	—		11	2
Livingston	2019–20	Scottish Premiership	21	0	1	0	3	0	—		25	0
Livingston	2020–21	Scottish Premiership	8	0	1	0	3	0	—		12	0
Livingston	2021–22	Scottish Premiership	16	1	2	0	5	0	—		23	1
Livingston	Total		59	2	5	0	15	1	1	0	80	3
Livingston U20	2018–19	—			—		—		1	0	1	0
Partick Thistle (loan)	2018–19	Scottish Championship	13	0	3	0	—		—		16	0
Partick Thistle	2022–23	Scottish Championship	36	1	3	0	6	1	7 (Note: One appearance in Scottish Challenge Cup; Six appearances, three goals in Scottish Premiership play-offs)	3	52	5
Partick Thistle	2023–24	Scottish Championship	28	2	3	0	1	0	5 (Note: One appearance in Scottish Challenge Cup; Four appearances in Scottish Premiership play-offs)	0	37	2
Partick Thistle	Total		64	3	6	0	7	1	12	3	89	7
Exeter City	2024–25	League One	44	2	4	0	1	0	0	0	49	2
Exeter City	2025–26	League One	18	1	2	0	0	0	3 (Note: Appearance(s) in EFL Trophy)	0	23	1
Exeter City	Total		62	3	6	0	1	0	3	0	72	3
Career total			218	9	21	0	24	2	21	3	284	14
