= Ben McKenna (footballer) =

English-born Northern Irish footballer

Personal information
- Full name: Benjamin James McKenna
- Date of birth: 16 January 1993 (age 33)
- Place of birth: Burnley, England
- Height: 1.79 m (5 ft 10 in)
- Position: Midfielder

Youth career
- 2001–2009: Burnley
- 2009–2010: Carlisle United

Senior career*
Years	Team	Apps	(Gls)
2010–2012	Carlisle United	2	(0)
2012	→ Annan Athletic (loan)	14	(0)
2013–2014	Workington	44	(4)
2014–2016	Stalybridge Celtic	73	(6)
2016	→ Ashton United (loan)	3	(0)
2016	Bradford Park Avenue	19	(3)
2016–2017	Southport	19	(2)
2017–2018	Stockport County	22	(1)
2018	Curzon Ashton	14	(3)
2018–2019	Bradford Park Avenue	21	(5)
2019	Chester	9	(1)
2019–2021	Spennymoor Town	41	(4)
2021	Farsley Celtic	7	(0)
2021–2022	Clitheroe	21	(2)
2023	Bury	1	(0)

International career
2009–2010	Northern Ireland U17	4	(0)
2010–2011	Northern Ireland U18	2	(0)
2011–2012	Northern Ireland U19	2	(0)
- * Club domestic league appearances and goals as of 14:13, 6 December 2023 (UTC)

Benjamin James McKenna (born 16 January 1993) is an English-born Northern Irish footballer. He plays as a midfielder.

== Early life ==
McKenna was born in Burnley, Lancashire. He attended Blessed Trinity RC College in the town. He started off at Burnley's academy, but after being released by his hometown club, McKenna joined Carlisle United on a two-year YTS contract.

== Career ==
=== Club ===
==== Carlisle United and loans ====
After impressive performances in the youth and reserve teams, McKenna got called up to the first team squad and made his senior debut for Carlisle United in a 6–0 FA Cup first round victory against Tipton Town in November 2010, as a 46th-minute substitute McKenna made his League debut in February 2011, during a 1–0 defeat to Sheffield Wednesday as a 79th-minute substitute. On 12 January 2012, he joined Scottish Third Division side Annan Athletic on loan until the end of the 2011–12 season. On 3 May 2012, Carlisle United announced that McKenna's contract would not be renewed at the end of the 2011–12 season.

==== Workington ====
After having an unsuccessful trial with League Two side Accrington Stanley in January 2013 McKenna joined Workington Reds on 4 March 2013 for the remainder of the 2012–2013 season.

==== Stalybridge Celtic ====
Between June 2014 and May 2016 he played for Stalybridge Celtic.

==== Bradford Park Avenue ====
In the summer of 2016 he joined Bradford Park Avenue.

==== Southport ====
In November 2016 he joined Southport.

==== Stockport County ====
He then joined Stockport County.

==== Curzon Ashton ====
McKenna left Stockport County in February 2018 to join fellow National League North side, Curzon Ashton.

==== Bradford Park Avenue (second spell) ====
In June 2018 he returned to Bradford Park Avenue for a second spell with the club.

==== Chester ====
In January 2019 he joined Chester from league rivals Bradford Park Avenue.

=== International ===
McKenna has been capped for Northern Ireland at under-17 under-18 and under-19 level.

== Career statistics ==
As of match played 22 March 2022

Appearances and goals by club, season and competition
Club	Season	League			FA Cup		League Cup		Other		Total	
Club	Season	Division	Apps	Goals	Apps	Goals	Apps	Goals	Apps	Goals	Apps	Goals
Carlisle United	2010–11	League One	1	0	1	0	0	0	0	0	2	0
Annan Athletic (loan)	2011–12	Scottish Third Division	14	0	0	0	0	0	0	0	14	0
Workington	2012–13	Conference North	5	0	—		—		—		5	0
Workington	2013–14	Conference North	39	4	1	0	—		0	0	40	4
Workington	Total		44	4	1	0	—		0	0	45	4
Stalybridge Celtic	2014–15	Conference North	41	5	1	0	—		2 (Note: Appearance(s) in the FA Trophy)	0	44	5
Stalybridge Celtic	2015–16	National League North	23	1	5	0	—		1	0	29	1
Stalybridge Celtic	Total		64	6	6	0	—		3	0	75	6
Bradford Park Avenue	2016–17	National League North	19	3	1	0	—		—		20	3
Southport	2016–17	National League	19	2	—		—		2	0	21	2
Stockport County	2017–18	National League North	17	0	2	0	—		3	1	22	1
Curzon Ashton	2017–18	National League North	14	3	—		—		—		14	3
Bradford Park Avenue	2018–19	National League North	21	5	2	0	—		1	0	24	5
Chester	2018–19	National League North	9	1	—		—		—		9	1
Spennymoor Town	2019–20	National League North	29	3	3	0	—		1	0	33	3
Spennymoor Town	2020–21	National League North	12	1	2	0	—		1	0	15	1
Spennymoor Town	Total		41	4	5	0	—		1	0	48	4
Farsley Celtic	2021–22	National League North	7	0	1	0	—		—		8	0
Clitheroe	2021–22	NPL Division One West	21	2	—		—		1	0	22	2
Career total			291	30	19	0	0	0	12	1	322	31
