= Tony Weston (footballer, born 2003) =

English footballer

Personal information
- Full name: Anthony John Billy Vaughan Weston
- Date of birth: 17 September 2003 (age 23)
- Place of birth: Liverpool, England
- Height: 5 ft 7 in (1.70 m)
- Position: Forward

Youth career
- Blackpool

Senior career*
Years	Team	Apps	(Gls)
2019–2020	Blackpool	0	(0)
2020–2023	Rangers	1	(0)
2022–2023	→ Partick Thistle (loan)	13	(0)
2023	→ Cove Rangers (loan)	13	(0)
2023–2025	Derby County	0	(0)
2024–2025	→ Boston United (loan)	25	(0)
2025–	Curzon Ashton	21	(6)
- * Club domestic league appearances and goals as of 04:18, 14 December 2025 (UTC)

Anthony John Billy Vaughan Weston (born 17 September 2003) is an English professional footballer who plays as a forward.

He started his career with Blackpool, before joining Rangers in 2020 and has had loan spells at Partick Thistle and Cove Rangers, he signed with Derby County in 2023 was sent on loan to Boston United in 2024. He left Derby County upon the expiry of his contract in June 2025.

== Career ==
After scoring fourteen goals in the Blackpool youth team in the first part of the 2019–20 season, first-team manager Simon Grayson invited Weston to travel with the squad to Ipswich Town on 23 November. He was taken out of school for the journey. He was then named on the bench in the Seasiders' following match, a home tie against Scunthorpe United in the EFL Trophy on 27 November. He made his professional debut on 1 December, in the final minute of normal time of Blackpool's 3–1 victory over Maidstone United in the second round of the FA Cup.

Weston joined Rangers on 31 July 2020 on a three-year contract for an undisclosed fee, reported to be £250,000. He initially played for the club's youth team; however, he made his debut for Rangers by replacing Steven Davis as a 71st-minute substitute during a 3–1 win over Heart of Midlothian on 14 May 2022. He was loaned to Partick Thistle in July 2022. Weston scored his first goal for Thistle in a 3–0 Scottish Cup victory over Kelty Hearts. On 19 January 2023, Weston joined Scottish Championship club Cove Rangers on loan until the end of the season. On 1 June 2023, he was released by Rangers.

On 1 August 2023, Weston joined Derby County, after a successful trial period, he joined the clubs under-21 team. He scored his first goal for the club on his debut, with the final goal in a 4-1 win over Wolverhampton Wanderers U-21s in the EFL Trophy on 8 November 2023. Derby head coach Paul Warne stated the Weston was getting closer to breaking into the first team after this performance. Weston made the substitutes bench in the next league match after this goal, against Barnsley on 11 November 2023. In his first season at Derby; Weston made two first team appearances for Derby both in the EFL Trophy, scoring one goal. For the under-21s, he would play in 19 Premier League 2 matches, scoring three times.

On 18 May 2024, Derby County confirmed that Weston was in talks to extend his contract at Derby with his deal expiring in June 2024. On 1 July 2024, it was confirmed that Weston had signed a one-year contract extension at Derby and would join National League Boston United on loan until January 2025. He played 30 times for Boston, failing to score a goal.

On 16 May 2025, it was announced by Derby County that his contract would not be renewed upon expiry in June 2025; he featured twice for Derby's first team in his two years at the club.

== Career statistics ==
As of match played 21 April 2025

Appearances and goals by club, season and competition
Club	Season	League			National Cup		League Cup		Other		Total	
Club	Season	Division	Apps	Goals	Apps	Goals	Apps	Goals	Apps	Goals	Apps	Goals
Blackpool	2019–20	League One	0	0	1	0	0	0	0	0	1	0
Rangers	2020–21	Scottish Premiership	0	0	0	0	0	0	0	0	0	0
Rangers	2021–22	Scottish Premiership	1	0	0	0	0	0	0	0	1	0
Rangers	2022–23	Scottish Premiership	0	0	0	0	0	0	0	0	0	0
Rangers	Total		1	0	0	0	0	0	0	0	1	0
Rangers B	2021–22	—			—		—		4 (Note: Appearances in Scottish Challenge Cup)	1	4	1
Partick Thistle (loan)	2022–23	Scottish Championship	13	0	1	1	3	0	1	0	18	1
Cove Rangers (loan)	2022–23	Scottish Championship	13	0	0	0	0	0	0	0	13	0
Derby County	2023–24	League One	0	0	0	0	0	0	2 (Note: Appearances in EFL Trophy)	1	2	1
Derby County	2024–25	Championship	0	0	0	0	0	0	0	0	0	0
Derby County	Total		0	0	0	0	0	0	2	1	2	1
Boston United (loan)	2024–25	National League	25	0	2	0	—		3 (Note: Appearances in FA Trophy)	0	30	0
Career total			52	0	4	1	3	0	10	2	59	3
