= Jamie Sneddon =

Scottish footballer (born 1997)

Personal information
- Date of birth: 6 September 1997 (age 29)
- Place of birth: Edinburgh, Scotland
- Height: 6 ft 1 in (1.85 m)
- Position: Goalkeeper

Team information
- Current team: Airdrieonians
- Number: 1

Youth career
- 2007–2014: Heart of Midlothian

Senior career*
Years	Team	Apps	(Gls)
2014–2017	Cowdenbeath	30	(0)
2017–2024	Partick Thistle	98	(1)
2024–2026	Falkirk	0	(0)
2026	→ Queen of the South (loan)	4	(0)
2026–	Airdrieonians	8	(0)
- * Club domestic league appearances and goals as of 13:44, 2 October 2026 (UTC)

Jamie Sneddon (born 6 September 1997) is a Scottish professional footballer who plays as a goalkeeper for Scottish League One club Airdrieonians.

== Career ==
=== Cowdenbeath ===
Born in Edinburgh, Sneddon began his career as a youth with local side Heart of Midlothian. After spending seven years in development at Tynecastle, Sneddon joined Fife's Scottish League Two side Cowdenbeath and made over thirty appearances for the club.

=== Partick Thistle ===
Sneddon played on trial with Hibernian in 2017, however he signed for (then) Scottish Premiership club Partick Thistle on 15 June 2017. Sneddon found himself third-choice keeper at Thistle behind Tomáš Černý and Ryan Scully. A poor season led to Thistle being relegated from the Premiership, which led to Černy and Scully departing the club.

For the 2018–19 Scottish Championship, Sneddon was promoted to back-up goalkeeper to Cammy Bell, and was first choice when Bell was injured during the season.

Sneddon signed a one-year contract extension at Thistle for the 2019/20 season. Sneddon also received the number 1 jersey, changing from 23.

Sneddon signed a further one-year contract with Thistle in December 2019, until May 2021.

After winning the 2020–21 Scottish League One title with Thistle, Sneddon signed a new one-year extension to his contract ahead of the Scottish Championship season.

Sneddon broke Thistle's club record for consecutive league clean sheets, after a 1-0 win over Hamilton Academical, his sixth league clean sheet in a row. Sneddon then went onto break another club record of consecutive clean sheets in all competitions, setting a new record of eight consecutive clean sheets in all competitions. Sneddon signed a new one-year contract extension in January 2022 to remain at Thistle until the end of the 2022–23 season.

Sneddon scored the first goal of his career, scoring a dramatic late equaliser for Thistle in the 95th minute to secure a 1-1 draw away to Cove Rangers, with a header from a corner.

Following Thistle's Premiership promotion play-off final defeat on penalties to Ross County, Sneddon signed a new one-year deal with the Jags ahead of the 2023–24 Scottish Championship season.

Sneddon left Partick Thistle after seven years with the club, following the conclusion of the 2023–24 season. Over his time at the club Sneddon made 128 appearances, kept 47 clean sheets and scored one goal in all competitions.

=== Falkirk ===
On June 10, 2024, Sneddon signed a two-year deal with newly promoted Championship side, Falkirk.

== Career statistics ==
=== Club ===
Appearances and goals by club, season and competition
Club	Season	League			Scottish Cup		League Cup		Other		Total	
Club	Season	Division	Apps	Goals	Apps	Goals	Apps	Goals	Apps	Goals	Apps	Goals
Cowdenbeath	2015–16	Scottish League One	15	0	3	0	1	0	0	0	19	0
Cowdenbeath	2016–17	Scottish League Two	15	0	0	0	0	0	0	0	15	0
Cowdenbeath	Total		30	0	3	0	1	0	0	0	34	0
Partick Thistle U20	2017–18	—			—		—		2 (Note: Appearance(s) in Scottish Challenge Cup)	0	2	0
Partick Thistle	2018–19	Scottish Championship	13	0	0	0	1	0	2	0	16	0
Partick Thistle	2019–20	Scottish Championship	6	0	0	0	2	0	0	0	8	0
Partick Thistle	2020–21	Scottish League One	10	0	0	0	3	0	0	0	13	0
Partick Thistle	2021–22	Scottish Championship	34	0	3	0	2	0	4 (Note: Two appearances in Scottish Challenge Cup; Two appearances in Scottish Premiership play-offs)	0	43	0
Partick Thistle	2022–23	Scottish Championship	14	1	3	0	3	0	1	0	21	1
Partick Thistle	2023–24	Scottish Championship	21	0	3	0	2	0	1	0	27	0
Partick Thistle	Total		98	1	9	0	13	0	8	0	128	1
Falkirk	2024–25	Scottish Championship	0	0	0	0	1	0	0	0	1	0
Falkirk	2025–26	Scottish Premiership	0	0	0	0	0	0	—		0	0
Falkirk	Total		0	0	0	0	1	0	0	0	1	0
Career total			129	1	12	0	15	0	10	0	166	1

== Honours ==
=== Club ===
Partick Thistle

- Scottish League One: 2020–21
