= Bryan Gilfillan =

Scottish footballer

Personal information
- Full name: Bryan James Gilillan
- Date of birth: 14 September 1984 (age 42)
- Place of birth: Cardenden, Scotland
- Positions: Defender; midfielder

Team information
- Current team: Gretna 2008 (Manager)

Senior career*
Years	Team	Apps	(Gls)
2000–2003	Inverness Caledonian Thistle	3	(0)
2001–2002	→ Brora Rangers (loan)		
2003–2004	Cowdenbeath	33	(7)
2004–2006	Gretna	26	(6)
2006	Stranraer	15	(0)
2006–2008	Peterhead	35	(1)
2008	Sunshine Coast	20	(5)
2008–2012	Annan Athletic	93	(12)
2012–2013	Clyde	17	(3)
2013	→ Peterhead (loan)	12	(1)
2013–2015	Peterhead	43	(5)
2015	Airdrieonians	11	(1)
2015–2016	Annan Athletic	11	(0)
2016	Threave Rovers		
2017	Penrith		
2017	Upper Annandale		
2017	Lochar Thistle		
2017	Gretna 2008		
2018	Cowdenbeath		
2018–2019	Gretna 2008		
2019	Lochar Thistle		
2019–2022	Gretna 2008		

International career
2005	Northern Ireland under-21		

Managerial career
- 2016: Threave Rovers
- 2017: Upper Annandale
- 2023–: Gretna 2008
- * Club domestic league appearances and goals as of 22:00, 13 July 2016 2016 (UTC)

Bryan James Gilfillan (born 14 September 1984), is a football manager and former player who played as a defender or midfielder. He is currently the manager of Gretna 2008.

He represented Northern Ireland at under-21 level.

== Club career ==
Gilfillan began his career with Inverness Caledonian Thistle in 2000, where he made a handful of substitute appearances before a loan spell at Brora Rangers in 2001. He later moved to Gretna, scoring 6 goals in 21 appearances, in a season that saw Gretna promoted to Division Two as Scottish Third Division 2004-05 champions. After a short spell at Stranraer and two years with Peterhead, Gilfillan went to Australia to play for Sunshine Coast in the Queensland State League. He returned to Scotland in December 2008, signing for Annan Athletic.

== International career ==
Although he was born in Scotland, Gilfillan's mother's family come from Northern Ireland, and he was first called up their under-21 team in 2005.
