= Steven Lawless =

Scottish footballer (born 1991)

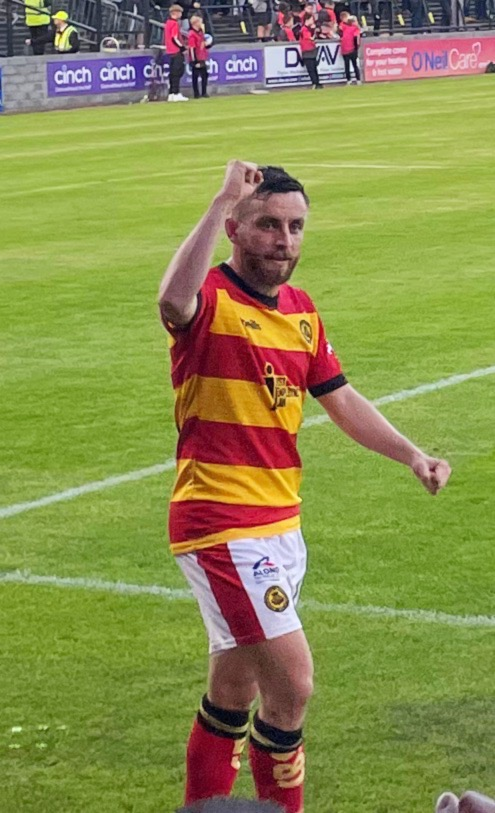
- Lawless in 2023

Personal information
- Full name: Steven Lawless
- Date of birth: 12 April 1991 (age 35)
- Place of birth: Glasgow, Scotland
- Position: Winger

Team information
- Current team: The Spartans

Senior career*
Years	Team	Apps	(Gls)
2009–2012	Motherwell	0	(0)
2010	→ Annan Athletic (loan)	0	(0)
2010–2011	→ Albion Rovers (loan)	25	(3)
2011–2012	→ Albion Rovers (loan)	10	(3)
2012–2018	Partick Thistle	190	(28)
2018–2020	Livingston	65	(11)
2020–2021	Burton Albion	16	(0)
2021	Motherwell	9	(0)
2021–2022	Dunfermline Athletic	18	(3)
2022–2026	Partick Thistle	95	(12)
2026–	The Spartans	9	(2)
- * Club domestic league appearances and goals as of 4 May 2026

Steven Lawless (born 12 April 1991) is a Scottish professional footballer who plays as a winger for Scottish League Two club The Spartans.

Lawless, who is a product of Motherwell's youth system, started his professional career at Fir Park. However, he failed to break into the club's first team, and was eventually loaned to Annan Athletic and later Albion Rovers. Following an extended loan period at Rovers, Lawless joined Partick Thistle in 2012, where he played a significant part in helping Thistle to achieve promotion to the Scottish Premiership in 2013. In 2018, he signed for Livingston, where he spent two seasons before joining English club Burton Albion. He returned to Motherwell in January 2021.

== Career ==
=== Motherwell ===
A product of the Fir Park youth system, Lawless was given a two-year professional contract in summer 2010, after helping Motherwell under-19s finish second in the 2009–10 Scottish Premier under-19 League, with Motherwell scoring the highest number of goals that season.

Lawless was loaned to Annan Athletic for a month at the beginning of the 2010–11 season, only managing to appear twice in cup competitions. He was then loaned to Albion Rovers towards the end of the transfer window, along with Steven Meechan and Peter Innes. Initially the loan was to last six months, but was extended to a full season after Lawless had impressed. He scored his first goal, in a 2–2 draw against former club Annan Athletic on 19 February 2011. Between 16 April 2011 and 23 April 2011, Lawless scored back-to-back goals against East Stirlingshire and Queen's Park. Later in the season, he helped the Cliftonhill side to promotion to the Second Division, beating former club Annan Athletic in the play-off final.

Lawless then returned to Fir Park and featured in a host of pre-season friendlies. He made his competitive first-team debut for Motherwell against Clyde in the League Cup, scoring the final goal in a 4–0 win.

On 18 October 2011, Lawless returned to Albion Rovers on an initial 28-day emergency loan, scoring on his second debut for the club in a 2–1 loss to Dumbarton. He then scored a brace, in a 3–3 draw against Cowdenbeath on 3 December 2011. The loan was later extended until 5 January.

On 11 May 2012, it was confirmed that Lawless would be released at the end of his contract, having not played regularly during the 2011–12 season. After leaving Motherwell for Partick Thistle, Lawless revealed he was disappointed to have never been given a chance in the first team at Motherwell.

=== Partick Thistle ===
Three days later on 15 May 2012, Lawless was signed by Jackie McNamara to play for Scottish First Division Partick Thistle, signing a two-year contract.

Lawless scored his first goal (and the club's first goal of the season, with a left-footed shot, as Thistle beat Falkirk 3–1 in the opening game of the season and would score again, the following week, in a 1–0 win over Dunfermline Athletic. Having made a perfect start to the season, Lawless was awarded the August IRN-BRU SFL Phenomenal Young Player of the Month. Lawless would say he couldn't have asked for a better start to his Partick Thistle career. On 19 January 2013, during a match between Thistle and Falkirk, he provided an assist for Conrad Balatoni to score the first goal before coming off in the 25th minute with a fractured cheekbone and after going under the knife, he was set to be out for a month, however, Lawless made a quick recovery following the operation. In his first season, Lawless become a regular player in the first team, scoring thirteen goals, including scoring three braces and he also helped Partick Thistle gain promotion to the Scottish Premier League for the first time in nine years. His performances attracted interest not only in Scotland, but also England. On 21 June 2013, Partick Thistle rejected a five-figure sum transfer fee for Lawless from recently relegated Dutch club Willem ll.

In the 2013–14 season, Lawless played his first Scottish Premiership game, in a 0–0 draw against Dundee United, where he made his first start and played 90 minutes. Then, eight days later, he scored twice, in a 3–1 win over Ross County, giving Thistle their first win of the season and first in the top flight since 2004. However, Lawless struggled for match action during the season. He then scored his third goal of the season, in a 5–1 loss against Motherwell on 29 December 2013 and then another against Ross County.

Following a relatively successful season with Thistle in the Scottish Premiership, Lawless signed a further contract to keep him at Firhill until the end of the 2014–15 Scottish Premiership season. Lawless made his 100th overall appearance for the Jags in a 5–0 win over Hamilton Academical at Firhill on 21 January 2015.

On 14 May 2015, Lawless was accused of breaching Scottish Football Association rules concerning gambling on matches and one week later was given a six-match ban, with four of those suspended until the end of the 2015–16 season. On 29 May 2015, he signed a new one-year contract extension with the Jags, keeping him at Firhill until the end of the 2015–16 Scottish Premiership season.

Thistle were relegated to the Scottish Championship via the play-offs at the end of the 2017–18 season. Following that relegation, Lawless was one of many players released by the club.

=== Livingston ===
On 1 August 2018, Lawless joined newly promoted Scottish Premiership side Livingston. He signed a new contract in June 2019.

=== Burton Albion ===
Lawless made the move to League One club Burton Albion on 13 July 2020, on a one-year deal. He scored his first goal for the club in an EFL Trophy tie against Peterborough United on 8 September 2020. Burton allowed Lawless to leave the club in January 2021 due to "family reasons".

=== Motherwell Return ===
On 15 January 2021, Lawless returned to Motherwell on a contract until the end of the 2021–22 season. On 11 October 2021, he left Motherwell by mutual consent.

=== Dunfermline Athletic ===
On 27 December 2021, Lawless signed with Scottish Championship side Dunfermline Athletic, becoming eligible to play for the club from January 2022. Captaining the club through most of his time there, Lawless' contract was not renewed following relegation to League One and he left on 27 May 2022.

=== Partick Thistle (2nd spell) ===
On 13 June 2022, Lawless re-joined Partick Thistle on a two-year deal.

Lawless scored the first goal of his second spell at Thistle on the opening day of the 2022–23 Scottish Championship season, in a 3–2 away win against Dundee.

Lawless scored his first goal of the 2023–24 season in a 4–1 away win over Greenock Morton in the Scottish Championship. In November 2023, Lawless signed a two year contract extension with Thistle, extending his deal to summer 2026. In April 2024, Lawless suffered a ruptured Achilles tendon in a 1–1 away draw with Dunfermline Athletic, ruling him out for the majority of 2024.

In August 2025, Lawless scored his first goal since returning from injury with a penalty, in a 3–1 away over Ross County in the Scottish Championship.

In February 2026 Lawless departed Thistle after spending 10 years at the club across two spells.

=== The Spartans ===
Lawless joined Scottish League Two club The Spartans in February 2026, on a deal until the end of the season.

== Career statistics ==
As of match played 7 May 2022

Appearances and goals by club, season and competition
Club	Season	League			National Cup		League Cup		Other		Total	
Club	Season	Division	Apps	Goals	Apps	Goals	Apps	Goals	Apps	Goals	Apps	Goals
Motherwell	2010–11	Scottish Premier League	0	0	0	0	0	0	0	0	0	0
Motherwell	2011–12	Scottish Premier League	0	0	1	0	1	1	—		2	1
Motherwell	Total		0	0	1	0	1	1	0	0	2	1
Annan Athletic (loan)	2010–11	Scottish Third Division	0	0	0	0	1	0	1 (Note: Appearances in the Scottish Challenge Cup)	0	2	0
Albion Rovers (loan)	2010–11	Scottish Third Division	25	3	1 (Note: Includes 1 match not listed on Soccerbase or Soccerway. Paterson, Colin (25 October 2010). "Match review: Albion Rovers 0 Sunnybank 1". Airdrie & Coatbridge Advertiser.)	0	0	0	2 (Note: Appearances in the Second Division play-offs)	0	28	3
Albion Rovers (loan)	2011–12	Scottish Second Division	10	3	0	0	0	0	0	0	10	3
Partick Thistle	2012–13	Scottish First Division	35	13	2	0	2	1	5	0	44	14
Partick Thistle	2013–14	Scottish Premiership	28	4	1	0	3	1	—		32	5
Partick Thistle	2014–15	Scottish Premiership	33	3	2	0	3	0	—		38	3
Partick Thistle	2015–16	Scottish Premiership	37	5	2	0	1	0	—		40	5
Partick Thistle	2016–17	Scottish Premiership	30	2	3	1	5	1	—		38	4
Partick Thistle	2017–18	Scottish Premiership	27	1	1	0	6	3	2 (Note: Appearances in the Scottish Premiership play-offs)	0	36	4
Partick Thistle	Total		190	28	11	1	20	6	7	0	228	35
Livingston	2018–19	Scottish Premiership	35	3	1	0	1	0	—		37	3
Livingston	2019–20	Scottish Premiership	30	8	2	2	6	1	—		38	11
Livingston	Total		65	11	3	2	7	1	0	0	75	14
Burton Albion	2020–21	EFL League One	16	0	0	0	2	0	2 (Note: Appearances in the EFL Trophy)	1	20	1
Motherwell	2020–21	Scottish Premiership	7	0	3	0	0	0	0	0	10	0
Motherwell	2021–22	Scottish Premiership	2	0	0	0	4	1	—		6	1
Motherwell	Total		9	0	3	0	4	1	0	0	16	1
Dunfermline Athletic	2021–22	Scottish Championship	18	3	0	0	0	0	2 (Note: Appearances in the Scottish Championship play-offs)	0	20	3
Career total			333	48	20	3	35	9	14	1	402	61

== Honours ==
Partick Thistle

- Scottish Football League First Division: 2012–13
- Scottish Challenge Cup runners up: 2012–13

Individual

- IRN-BRU SFL Phenomenal Young Player of the Month: August 2012.
