= Aaron Muirhead =

Scottish footballer (born 1990)

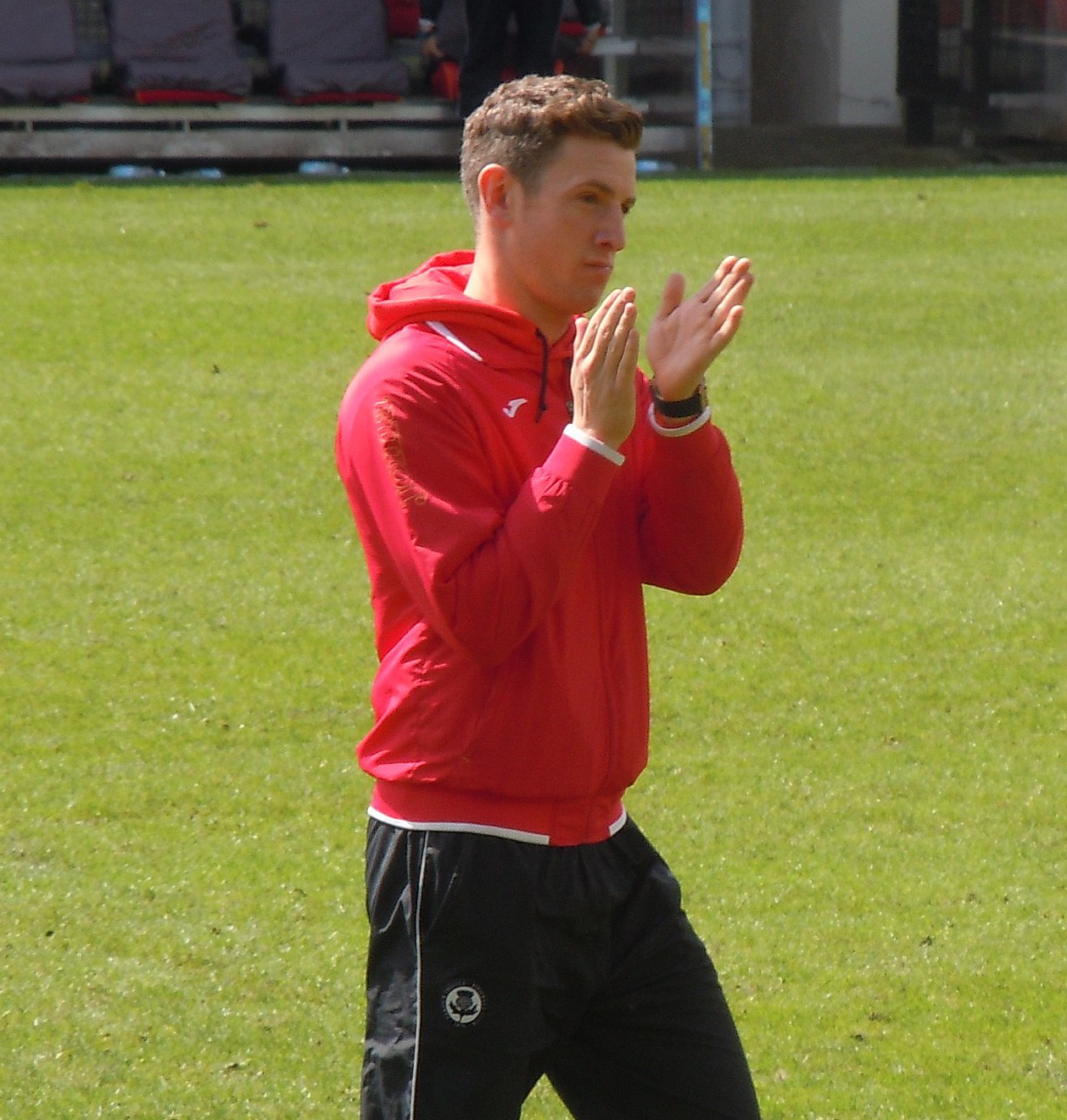
- Muirhead with Thistle

Personal information
- Date of birth: 30 August 1990 (age 36)
- Place of birth: Dumfries, Scotland
- Height: 1.91 m (6 ft 3 in)
- Position: Centre back

Team information
- Current team: Arbroath
- Number: 6

Youth career
- Dalbeattie Star
- Ayr United
- Queen of the South

Senior career*
Years	Team	Apps	(Gls)
2008–2012	Annan Athletic	92	(9)
2012–2014	Partick Thistle	55	(7)
2015–2019	Falkirk	110	(10)
2019–2022	Ayr United	84	(9)
2022–2025	Partick Thistle	72	(2)
2025	→ Arbroath (loan)	12	(2)
2025–	Arbroath	32	(3)
- * Club domestic league appearances and goals as of 4 May 2026

Aaron Muirhead (born 30 August 1990) is a Scottish professional footballer who plays for Scottish Championship club Arbroath. Muirhead has previously played for Annan Athletic, twice for Partick Thistle, as well as spells at Falkirk, and Ayr United and a loan spell with Arbroath.

== Career ==
Muirhead started his career with Ayr United's youth academy, before signing for Annan Athletic in November 2008, going on to play in 127 matches and scoring 15 goals. Muirhead signed for Partick Thistle in May 2012.

Muirhead is the nephew of Davie Irons, who also played for the Firhill club.

=== Partick Thistle ===
Muirhead signed for the Harry Wraggs during the 2012 close season from the Galabankies. In the 2013 Scottish Challenge Cup Final versus his home town club, Queen of the South, Muirhead missed a penalty in the defeat and was sent off for head butting Queens captain, Chris Higgins. Muirhead received a four match suspension following this incident.

Muirhead scored his first Premiership goal for newly promoted Partick Thistle in a 1–1 home draw with Hearts, scoring an 85th-minute penalty. Muirhead then scored his second goal of the season with another penalty versus Kilmarnock in another 1–1 home draw. Muirhead scored his third goal of the season, again with a penalty to make it 1–1 in a 4–1 defeat away to Dundee United. Muirhead also scored a penalty in the Scottish League Cup win versus Cowdenbeath as the Harry Wraggs won 3-1 after extra time.

=== Falkirk ===
After leaving Thistle by mutual consent, Muirhead signed for Falkirk in January 2015 alongside former Thistle team-mate Mark Kerr. Muirhead departed the club on 23 January 2019, with his contract being terminated by mutual consent.

=== Ayr United ===
On 24 January 2019, Muirhead signed for Ayr United on a contract until the end of the 2019–20 season.

=== Partick Thistle (second spell) ===
Muirhead returned to Thistle during the 2022 close season.

Muirhead scored his first goal on his return to Thistle, scoring the equaliser with a curling shot into the top corner in a league cup group stage game against Kilmarnock.

Muirhead was part of the Thistle squad that made it to the Scottish Premiership play off final, which they eventually lost on penalties to Ross County, meaning Thistle remained in the Scottish Championship. Following this Muirhead signed a one-year extension to his Thistle contract.

Following the conclusion of the 2023–24 season, Muirhead triggered an appearance based contract extension, which added a year to his Thistle deal.

In February 2025, Muirhead joined Scottish League One side Arbroath on loan until the end of the season.

=== Arbroath ===
After winning League One with Arbroath during his loan spell, Muirhead joined Arbroath permanently in June 2025, on a one year deal.

== Career statistics ==
As of match played 11 May 2019

Appearances and goals by club, season and competition
Club	Season	League			Scottish Cup		League Cup		Other		Total	
Club	Season	Division	Apps	Goals	Apps	Goals	Apps	Goals	Apps	Goals	Apps	Goals
Annan Athletic	2008–09	Scottish Third Division	11	0	0	0	0	0	0	0	11	0
Annan Athletic	2009–10	Scottish Third Division	23	0	1	0	1	0	3 (Note: Appearances in the Scottish Challenge Cup)	0	28	0
Annan Athletic	2010–11	Scottish Third Division	31	2	4	1	1	0	5 (Note: One appearance and a goal in the Scottish Challenge Cup; four appearances and a goal in the Second Division play-offs)	2	41	5
Annan Athletic	2011–12	Scottish Third Division	27	7	3	1	1	0	3	1	34	9
Annan Athletic	Total		92	9	8	2	3	0	11	3	114	14
Partick Thistle	2012–13	Scottish First Division	30	4	2	0	2	0	5	0	39	4
Partick Thistle	2013–14	Scottish Premiership	20	3	0	0	1	1	—		21	4
Partick Thistle	2014–15	Scottish Premiership	5	0	0	0	1	0	—		6	0
Partick Thistle	Total		55	7	2	0	4	1	5	0	66	8
Falkirk	2014–15	Scottish Championship	3	0	2	0	0	0	0	0	5	0
Falkirk	2015–16	Scottish Championship	31	0	2	0	3	1	6 (Note: One appearance in the Scottish Challenge Cup; Four appearances in the Scottish Premiership play-offs)	0	42	1
Falkirk	2016–17	Scottish Championship	26	4	1	0	2	0	2 (Note: Appearances in the Scottish Premiership play-offs)	0	31	4
Falkirk	2017–18	Scottish Championship	33	5	3	1	4	1	3	0	43	7
Falkirk	2018–19	Scottish Championship	17	1	1	0	3	0	2	0	23	1
Falkirk	Total		110	10	9	1	12	2	13	0	144	13
Ayr United	2018–19	Scottish Championship	9	0	0	0	0	0	2 (Note: Appearances in the Scottish Premiership play-offs)	0	11	0
Career total			266	26	19	3	19	3	31	3	335	35

== Honours ==
Partick Thistle

- Scottish First Division: 1

2012–13

Arbroath

- Scottish League One: 2024–25
