= 2024–25 Ayr United F.C. season =

Ayr United
2024–25 season
- Chairman: David Smith
- Manager: Scott Brown
- Stadium: Somerset Park
- Scottish Championship: 3rd
- Premiership play-offs: Quarter-finals
- Scottish Cup: Fifth round
- Scottish League Cup: Group stage
- Scottish Challenge Cup: Quarter-finals
- Top goalscorer: League: George Oakley (13); All: George Oakley (16)
- Highest home attendance: 7,364 vs. Hibernian, Scottish Cup, 7 February 2025
- Lowest home attendance: 1,415 vs. Buckie Thistle, League Cup, 27 July 2024
- Average home league attendance: 2,818
Home colours	Away colours	Third colours

The 2024–25 season was Ayr United's seventh consecutive season in the Scottish Championship after being promoted from League One in the 2017–18 season. Ayr are also competing in the Scottish Cup, League Cup, and Challenge Cup.

== Results and fixtures ==
Win Draw Loss Postponed

=== Pre-season ===
27 June 2024 John Sludden Trophy	East Stirlingshire	2–4	Ayr United	Falkirk
19:30	52' 67'		Bryden 5', 25'; McKenzie 11'; Ben Dempsey 27'	Stadium: Falkirk Stadium

2 July 2024	East Kilbride	2–4	Ayr United	East Kilbride
19:30	Watson 42'; Robertson 49'		Dowds 8'; Oakley 23'; Rus 58'; Bryden 90+1'	Stadium: K-Park Training Academy

5 July 2024	Ayr United	1–1	Celtic	Ayr
19:45	Dowds 34' (pen.)	Report	Furuhashi 24' (pen.)	Stadium: Somerset Park

11 July 2024 Ayrshire Derby	Ayr United	3–2	Kilmarnock	Ayr
19:45	Stanger 25'; Rus 34'; Dowds 65' (pen.)		Lyons 43'; Deas 72'	Stadium: Somerset Park

=== Scottish Championship ===
3 August 2024 1	Hamilton Academical	0–2	Ayr United	Hamilton
15:00	Martin (red card) 68'	Report	Stanger 18'; Dowds 72'	Stadium: New Douglas Park; Attendance: 1,468; Referee: Lloyd Wilson

9 August 2024 2	Ayr United	5–0	Airdrieonians	Ayr
19:45	Henderson 7', 49'; Oakley 24'; Dowds 56', 77' (pen.)	Report		Stadium: Somerset Park; Attendance: 2,857

17 August 2024 3	Ayr United	3–2	Hamilton Academical	Ayr
15:00	Murphy 8'; Rus 51'; Oakley 66'	Report	Shaw 27'; Barjonas 38'	Stadium: Somerset Park; Attendance: 2,846

24 August 2024 4	Ayr United	2–0	Raith Rovers	Ayr
15:00	Dowds 40' (pen.); Walker 90'	Report	Byrne (red card) 38'	Stadium: Somerset Park; Attendance: 2,928

31 August 2024 5	Dunfermline Athletic	1–1	Ayr United	Dunfermline
15:00	Otoo 15'	Report	Watret 22'	Stadium: East End Park; Attendance: 4,921; Referee: Ross Hardie

14 September 2024 6	Ayr United	1–1	Partick Thistle	Ayr
15:00	Dowds 25' (pen.)	Report	Milne 74'	Stadium: Somerset Park; Attendance: 3,118; Referee: Ross Hardie

21 September 2024 7	Queen's Park	1–1	Ayr United	Glasgow
15:00	Kerr 35'	Report	Dempsey 57'	Stadium: Hampden Park; Attendance: 1,635; Referee: Iain Snedden

28 September 2024 8	Ayr United	1–0	Greenock Morton	Ayr
15:00	Henderson 66' (pen.)	Report		Stadium: Somerset Park; Attendance: 2,846; Referee: Colin Steven

5 October 2024 9	Falkirk	2–0	Ayr United	Falkirk
15:00	Ross 8', 51'	Report		Stadium: Falkirk Stadium; Attendance: 6,753; Referee: Nick Walsh

19 October 2024 10	Ayr United	1–2	Livingston	Ayr
15:00	McLennan 42'	Report	Muirhead 8'; Pittman 38'	Stadium: Somerset Park; Attendance: 2,470; Referee: Don Robertson

26 October 2024 11	Airdrieonians	0–1	Ayr United	Airdrie
15:00		Report	Watret 70'	Stadium: Excelsior Stadium; Attendance: 1,747; Referee: Grant Irvine

1 November 2024 12	Raith Rovers	2–0	Ayr United	Kirkcaldy
19:45	Jamieson 19', 43'	Report		Stadium: Stark's Park; Attendance: 3,427; Referee: Lloyd Wilson

8 November 2024 13	Greenock Morton	1–1	Ayr United	Greenock
19:45	Wilson 37'	Report	Oakley 50'	Stadium: Cappielow; Attendance: 1,697; Referee: Peter Stuart

16 November 2024 14	Ayr United	3–2	Queen's Park	Ayr
15:00	Henderson 31' (pen.); McKenzie 39'; Oakley 76'	Report	Hinds 81'; Turner 83'; Hickey-Fugaccia (red card) 90+3'	Stadium: Somerset Park; Attendance: 2,012; Referee: Calum Scott

23 November 2024 15	Ayr United	1–0	Dunfermline Athletic	Ayr
15:15	Henderson 67'	Report		Stadium: Somerset Park; Attendance: 1,701; Referee: Craig Napier

7 December 2024 16	Partick Thistle	1–0	Ayr United	Glasgow
15:00	Turner 82' (pen.)	Report		Stadium: Firhill Stadium; Attendance: 3,521; Referee: Calum Scott

14 December 2024 17	Ayr United	5–2	Falkirk	Ayr
15:00	McLennan 34'; Dempsey 38'; McMann 40'; Bavidge 60', 70'	Report	MacIver 2'; Graham (red card) 8'; Agyeman 36'	Stadium: Somerset Park; Attendance: 3,039; Referee: David Dickinson

21 December 2024 18	Livingston	0–1	Ayr United	Livingston
15:00		Report	Oakley 41'	Stadium: Almondvale Stadium; Attendance: 1,521; Referee: Duncan Williams

28 December 2024 19	Ayr United	0–0	Greenock Morton	Ayr
15:00		Report		Stadium: Somerset Park; Attendance: 2,974; Referee: Duncan Nicolson

4 January 2025 20	Ayr United	3–0	Raith Rovers	Ayr
15:00	Oakley 2', 12', 25'	Report		Stadium: Somerset Park; Attendance: 2,733; Referee: Colin Steven

14 January 2025 21	Dunfermline Athletic	0–2	Ayr United	Dunfermline
19:45		Report	Henderson 61'; Oakley 71'	Stadium: East End Park; Attendance: 4,634; Referee: Nick Walsh

25 January 2025 22	Ayr United	2–1	Partick Thistle	Ayr
15:00	Oakley 19', 36'; McAllister (red card) 76'	Report	Milne 87'	Stadium: Somerset Park; Attendance: 3,175; Referee: Peter Stuart

1 February 2025 23	Hamilton Academical	0–2	Ayr United	Hamilton
15:00		Report	McKenzie 80'; Stanger 84'	Stadium: New Douglas Park; Attendance: 2,561; Referee: Matthew MacDermid

15 February 2025 24	Falkirk	2–2	Ayr United	Falkirk
15:00	Henderson 45'; Arfield 62'	Report	Henderson 14' (pen.); Oakley 38'	Stadium: Falkirk Stadium; Attendance: 7,419; Referee: Steven McLean

22 February 2025 25	Ayr United	1–2	Livingston	Ayr
15:00	Rus 73'	Report	Wilson 33'; Muirhead 90+6'	Stadium: Somerset Park; Attendance: 3,063; Referee: Don Robertson

1 March 2025 26	Ayr United	4–1	Airdrieonians	Ayr
15:00	Oakley 6'; Stanger 36'; Main 39', 78'	Report	Wilson 59' (pen.)	Stadium: Somerset Park; Attendance: 2,537; Referee: Euan Anderson

4 March 2025 27	Queen's Park	2–3	Ayr United	Glasgow
19:45	Turner 49'; Rudden 54'	Report	Rus 66'; Dempsey 76'; Main 79'	Stadium: Hampden Park; Attendance: 1,557; Referee: Lloyd Wilson

8 March 2025 28	Greenock Morton	2–1	Ayr United	Greenock
15:00	Blues 56'; Davies 77'; Corr (red card) 84'	Report	Main 8'	Stadium: Cappielow; Attendance: 2,235; Referee: John Beaton

15 March 2025 29	Partick Thistle	2–0	Ayr United	Glasgow
15:00	Chalmers 19'; McBeth 27'	Report		Stadium: Firhill Stadium; Attendance: 4,289; Referee: Lloyd Wilson

22 March 2025 30	Ayr United	1–1	Hamilton Academical	Ayr
15:00	Walker 90+5'	Report	Shaw 65'	Stadium: Somerset Park; Attendance: 2,587; Referee: Chris Graham

29 March 2025 31	Ayr United	3–0	Dunfermline Athletic	Ayr
15:00	McLennan 43'; Murphy 68'; Walker 90+4'	Report	Wanyama (red card) 84'	Stadium: Somerset Park; Attendance: 3,253; Referee: Iain Snedden

5 April 2025 32	Raith Rovers	1–0	Ayr United	Glasgow
15:00	Easton 62'	Report		Stadium: Firhill Stadium; Attendance: 3,919; Referee: Chris Graham

11 April 2025 33	Ayr United	1–1	Falkirk	Ayr
19:45	Walker 90' (red card) 90+3'	Report	Mackie 44'	Stadium: Somerset Park; Attendance: 4,471; Referee: Don Robertson

18 April 2025 34	Livingston	5–0	Ayr United	Livingston
19:45	Kelly 6', 45'; Muirhead 33' (pen.); Montaño 79'; McAlear 90+1'	Report		Stadium: Almondvale Stadium; Attendance: 1,606; Referee: Steven McLean

26 April 2025 35	Ayr United	2–2	Queen's Park	Ayr
15:00	Murphy 16'; McKenzie 54'	Report	Drozd 22'; MacGregor 31'	Stadium: Somerset Park; Attendance: 2,122; Referee: Sean Murdoch

2 May 2025 36	Airdrieonians	0–1	Ayr United	Airdrie
19:45		Report	Dempsey 44'	Stadium: Excelsior Stadium; Attendance: 1,637; Referee: Steven Kirkland

=== Premiership play-offs ===
6 May 2025 Quarter-final 1st leg	Partick Thistle	0–1	Ayr United	Glasgow
19:45		Report	Murphy 55'	Stadium: Firhill Stadium; Attendance: 5,250; Referee: David Dickinson

9 May 2025 Quarter-final 2nd leg	Ayr United	0–2 (1–2 agg.)	Partick Thistle	Ayr
19:45		Report	Graham 6', 88'	Stadium: Somerset Park; Attendance: 5,308; Referee: Nick Walsh

=== Scottish League Cup ===
==== Group stage ====
16 July 2024 1	Ayr United	1–0	Falkirk	Ayr
19:45	Dowds 5'	Report		Stadium: Somerset Park; Attendance: 1,900; Referee: Calum Scott

20 July 2024 2	Dundee United	2–1	Ayr United	Dundee
15:00	Babunski 17'; Forbes 68'	Report	Rus 55'	Stadium: Tannadice Park; Attendance: 2,157; Referee: Kevin Clancy

23 July 2024 3	Stenhousemuir	1–4	Ayr United	Stenhousemuir
19:45	Taylor 6'	Report	Oakley 8'; Musonda 26'; Dowds 56'; Henderson 65'	Stadium: Ochilview Park; Attendance: 629; Referee: Gavin Duncan

27 July 2024 4	Ayr United	3–2	Buckie Thistle	Ayr
15:00	Henderson 30', 43'; Hastie 67'	Report	Peters 45'; McLeod 57'	Stadium: Somerset Park; Attendance: 1,415; Referee: Colin Steven

=== Scottish Challenge Cup ===
8 September 2024 Third round	Ayr United	3–2	Raith Rovers	Ayr
13:00	Dowds 49' (pen.), 69'; Oakley 70'	Report	Smith 11'; Easton 15'	Stadium: Somerset Park; Attendance: 1,750; Referee: Graham Grainger

12 October 2024 Fourth round	Ayr United	2–1	Peterhead	Ayr
15:00	Murphy 34'; Walker 53'	Report	Smith 62'	Stadium: Somerset Park; Attendance: 1,698; Referee: George Calder

12 November 2024 Quarter-finals	East Kilbride	3–2	Ayr United	East Kilbride
19:40	Robertson 1'; Baldé 12'; Elliott 67'	Report	Henderson 58'; Rus 64'	Stadium: K-Park Training Academy; Attendance: 605; Referee: Ryan Lee

=== Scottish Cup ===
30 November 2024 Third round	Ayr United	2–0	Greenock Morton	Ayr
15:00	Devlin 63'; Murphy 89'	Report		Stadium: Somerset Park; Attendance: 1,775; Referee: Iain Snedden

18 January 2025 Fourth round	Broxburn Athletic	0–8	Ayr United	Broxburn
15:00		Report	Agbaire 16'; Henderson 38' (pen.), 52', 90'; McKenzie 65'; Oakley 69'; Hastie 70'; Watret 77'	Stadium: Albyn Park; Attendance: 2,100; Referee: Lloyd Wilson

7 February 2025 Fifth round	Ayr United	0–1	Hibernian	Ayr
19:45		Report	Bushiri 87'	Stadium: Somerset Park; Attendance: 7,364; Referee: Kevin Clancy

== Squad statistics ==
=== Appearances ===
As of 9 May 2025

No.	Pos	Nat	Player	Total		Championship + Play-offs		League Cup		Challenge Cup		Scottish Cup	
No.	Pos	Nat	Player	Apps	Goals	Apps	Goals	Apps	Goals	Apps	Goals	Apps	Goals
1	GK	(Scotland) SCO	Robbie Mutch	1	0	1+0	0	0+0	0	0+0	0	0+0	0
2	DF	(Scotland) SCO	Nick McAllister	33	0	21+5	0	1+0	0	3+0	0	0+3	0
3	DF	(Scotland) SCO	Patrick Reading	39	0	28+2	0	3+0	0	3+0	0	3+0	0
4	DF	(Zambia) ZAM	Frankie Musonda	19	1	11+5	0	1+1	1	0+0	0	0+1	0
5	DF	(Scotland) SCO	Mikey Devlin	12	1	10+0	0	0+0	0	0+0	0	2+0	1
7	FW	(Scotland) SCO	Anton Dowds	11	9	6+0	5	4+0	2	1+0	2	0+0	0
8	MF	(England) ENG	Ben Dempsey	44	4	36+0	4	3+0	0	3+0	0	2+0	0
9	FW	(England) ENG	George Oakley	48	16	34+4	13	4+0	1	3+0	1	3+0	1
10	MF	(Scotland) SCO	Connor McLennan	32	3	27+1	3	0+0	0	2+0	0	2+0	0
14	DF	(New Zealand) NZL	George Stanger	44	3	34+1	3	4+0	0	3+0	0	2+0	0
15	FW	(Scotland) SCO	Jamie Murphy	32	6	16+11	4	1+0	0	1+0	1	1+2	1
16	FW	(Scotland) SCO	Jake Hastie	33	2	7+18	0	1+3	1	0+3	0	0+1	1
17	MF	(Scotland) SCO	Jay Henderson	47	14	32+5	7	4+0	3	3+0	1	3+0	3
21	MF	(England) ENG	Ethan Walker	24	5	3+18	4	0+1	0	0+2	1	0+0	0
22	FW	(Scotland) SCO	Mark McKenzie	40	4	12+20	3	3+0	0	1+2	0	2+0	1
23	MF	(Romania) ROU	Marco Rus	39	5	21+10	3	3+0	1	2+1	1	1+1	0
25	MF	(Scotland) SCO	Kenzie Mitchell	1	0	0+0	0	0+0	0	0+0	0	0+1	0
26	DF	(Scotland) SCO	Lenny Agbaire	16	1	11+3	0	0+0	0	0+0	0	2+0	1
28	MF	(Scotland) SCO	David Craig	1	0	0+1	0	0+0	0	0+0	0	0+0	0
30	FW	(England) ENG	Curtis Main	15	4	8+6	4	0+0	0	0+0	0	0+1	0
31	GK	(Scotland) SCO	Harry Stone	24	0	15+0	0	4+0	0	3+0	0	2+0	0
32	MF	(Scotland) SCO	Dylan Watret	31	3	16+9	2	3+0	0	1+0	0	2+0	1
33	DF	(Scotland) SCO	Scott McMann	40	1	30+2	1	4+0	0	1+0	0	3+0	0
36	MF	(Scotland) SCO	Cole McKinnon	15	0	7+5	0	0+0	0	0+0	0	3+0	0
38	GK	(Scotland) SCO	Liam Russell	12	0	11+0	0	0+0	0	0+0	0	1+0	0
61	GK	(Scotland) SCO	Josh Clarke	10	0	10+0	0	0+0	0	0+0	0	0+0	0
Players who left the club during the 2024–25 season
6	MF	(Scotland) SCO	Andy Murdoch	0	0	0+0	0	0+0	0	0+0	0	0+0	0
10	MF	(Republic of Ireland) IRL	Aiden McGeady	0	0	0+0	0	0+0	0	0+0	0	0+0	0
11	FW	(Scotland) SCO	Fraser Bryden	3	0	0+0	0	0+3	0	0+0	0	0+0	0
18	MF	(Scotland) SCO	Jamie Hislop	5	0	0+3	0	0+0	0	0+1	0	0+1	0
19	GK	(Scotland) SCO	Ollie Ecrepont	0	0	0+0	0	0+0	0	0+0	0	0+0	0
20	MF	(Albania) ALB	Roy Syla	12	0	2+7	0	1+1	0	1+0	0	0+0	0
24	MF	(Scotland) SCO	Scott Tomlinson	3	0	0+1	0	0+2	0	0+0	0	0+0	0
25	MF	(Wales) WAL	Ryan Howley	13	0	3+7	0	0+0	0	2+1	0	0+0	0
26	DF	(Scotland) SCO	Connor McAvoy	0	0	0+0	0	0+0	0	0+0	0	0+0	0
27	FW	(Scotland) SCO	Max Guthrie	0	0	0+0	0	0+0	0	0+0	0	0+0	0
29	FW	(Scotland) SCO	Lucas McRoberts	0	0	0+0	0	0+0	0	0+0	0	0+0	0
36	FW	(Scotland) SCO	Alfie Bavidge	15	2	3+11	2	0+0	0	0+0	0	0+1	0
61	GK	(England) ENG	Jack McIntyre	1	0	1+0	0	0+0	0	0+0	0	0+0	0

== Team statistics ==
=== League table ===
Pos	Team	Pld	W	D	L	GF	GA	GD	Pts	Promotion, qualification or relegation
1	Falkirk (C, P)	36	22	7	7	72	33	+39	73	Promotion to the Premiership
2	Livingston (O, P)	36	20	10	6	55	27	+28	70	Qualification for the Premiership play-off semi-final
3	Ayr United	36	18	9	9	57	39	+18	63	Qualification for the Premiership play-off quarter-final
4	Partick Thistle	36	15	10	11	43	38	+5	55	Qualification for the Premiership play-off quarter-final
5	Raith Rovers	36	15	8	13	47	43	+4	53	

Rules for classification: 1) Points; 2) Goal difference; 3) Goals scored; 4) Head-to-to head points; 5) Head-to-head goal difference; 6) Play-off (only for deciding promotion, play-off participation and relegation).
(C) Champions; (O) Play-off winners; (P) Promoted

=== League Cup table ===
Pos	Team	Pld	W	PW	PL	L	GF	GA	GD	Pts	Qualification	FAL	DUN	AYR	STE	BUC
1	Falkirk	4	3	0	0	1	11	2	+9	9	Qualification for the second round	—	2–0	—	4–0	—
2	Dundee United	4	3	0	0	1	10	5	+5	9	Qualification for the second round	—	—	2–1	3–0	—
3	Ayr United	4	3	0	0	1	9	5	+4	9		1–0	—	—	—	3–2
4	Stenhousemuir	4	1	0	0	3	5	11	−6	3		—	—	1–4	—	4–0
5	Buckie Thistle	4	0	0	0	4	5	17	−12	0		1–5	2–5	—	—	—

Rules for classification: 1) goal difference, 2) goals scored, 3) away goals scored, 4) matches won, 5) away matches won, 6) drawing of lots.

== Transfers ==
=== Transfers in ===
Date	Position	Name	From	Fee	Ref.
24 May 2024	FW	(England) George Oakley	Greenock Morton	Free transfer	
25 May 2024	FW	Anton Dowds	Partick Thistle	Free transfer	
15 June 2024	MF	(Romania) Marco Rus	(England) Coventry City	Undisclosed	
16 June 2024	DF	Scott McMann	Dundee United	Free transfer	
19 June 2024	MF	(England) Ethan Walker	(England) Blackburn Rovers	Free transfer	
9 July 2024	MF	Jake Hastie	(England) Hartlepool United	Free transfer	
16 July 2024	GK	Liam Russell	Queen's Park	Free transfer	
19 July 2024	DF	Mikey Devlin	Livingston	Free transfer	
6 September 2024	DF	Jamie Hamilton	Hamilton Academical	Free transfer	
6 September 2024	GK	(England) Jack McIntyre	(England) Accrington Stanley	Free transfer	
11 October 2024	MF	Connor McLennan	(England) Salford City	Free transfer	
25 January 2025	FW	(England) Curtis Main	Dundee	Free transfer	

=== Transfers out ===
Date	Position	Name	To	Fee	Ref.
6 May 2024	GK	(England) Charlie Albinson	Hamilton Academical	Free transfer	
6 May 2024	DF	(England) Nathan McGinley	(England) Spennymoor Town	Free transfer	
6 May 2024	MF	Carter Jenkins	University of Stirling	Free transfer	
6 May 2024	MF	Paul Smith	Annan Athletic	Free transfer	
6 May 2024	MF	Dario Viviani	Troon	Free transfer	
24 May 2024	FW	(England) Franny Amartey	(England) Weymouth	Free transfer	
24 May 2024	FW	(Jamaica) Ahkeem Rose	(England) Hereford	Free transfer	
16 June 2024	DF	(Republic of Ireland) Sean McGinty	Hamilton Academical	Free transfer	
1 October 2024	MF	(Republic of Ireland) Aiden McGeady	Retired		
16 January 2025	DF	Jamie Hamilton	East Kilbride	Free transfer	
16 January 2025	MF	(Albania) Roy Syla	(Albania) KF Bylis	Free transfer	
7 February 2025	MF	Andy Murdoch	Clyde	Free transfer	

=== Loans in ===
Date	Position	Name	From	End date	Ref.
31 May 2024	GK	Harry Stone	Heart of Midlothian	31 May 2025	
1 June 2024	MF	Jay Henderson	Ross County	31 May 2025	
28 August 2024	MF	(Wales) Ryan Howley	(England) Coventry City	1 January 2025	
30 August 2024	DF	Connor McAvoy	(England) Fulham	1 January 2025	
31 August 2024	FW	Alfie Bavidge	Aberdeen	1 January 2025	
8 January 2025	MF	Cole McKinnon	Rangers	31 May 2025	
9 January 2025	DF	Lenny Agbaire	Celtic	31 May 2025	

=== Loans out ===
Date	Position	Name	To	End date	Ref.
19 July 2024	GK	Ollie Ecrepont	East Stirlingshire	31 May 2025	
3 August 2024	MF	Andy Murdoch	Clyde	1 January 2025	
23 August 2024	FW	Frase Bryden	Queen of the South	31 May 2025	
31 August 2024	FW	Max Guthrie	Stranraer	31 May 2025	
6 September 2024	FW	Lucas McRoberts	Bonnyrigg Rose	31 May 2025	
6 September 2024	DF	Jamie Hamilton	East Kilbride	1 January 2025	
24 September 2024	MF	Scott Tomlinson	Stenhousemuir	31 May 2025	
30 September 2024	GK	Robbie Mutch	Stranraer	1 January 2025	
27 January 2025	MF	Jamie Hislop	Cumnock Juniors	31 May 2025	
