= 2025–26 Ayr United F.C. season =

Ayr United
2025–26 season
- Chairman: David Smith
- Manager: Scott Brown (until 30 March); John Rankin (interim) (from 31 March)
- Stadium: Somerset Park
- Scottish Championship: Seventh place
- Scottish Cup: Fourth round
- Scottish League Cup: Second round
- Scottish Challenge Cup: Semi-finals
- Top goalscorer: League: Mark McKenzie; Jamie Murphy (7); All: Anton Dowds; Mark McKenzie; Jamie Murphy (7)
- Highest home attendance: 3,253 vs. Partick Thistle, Championship, 4 April 2026
- Lowest home attendance: 581 vs. Peterhead, Challenge Cup, 9 December 2025
- Average home league attendance: 2,112

The 2025–26 season is Ayr United's eighth consecutive season in the Scottish Championship after being promoted from League One in the 2017–18 season. Ayr are also competing in the Scottish Cup, League Cup, and Challenge Cup.

== Results and fixtures ==
Win Draw Loss Postponed

=== Pre-season ===
25 June 2025 Friendly	East Stirlingshire	0–3	Ayr United	Stenhousemuir
19:45			Murphy; Walker; Bryden	Stadium: Ochilview Park

27 June 2025 Friendly	Ayr United	1–1	(Wales) The New Saints	East Kilbride
19:45	Walker 49'		Clarke 78'	Stadium: K-Park Training Academy

1 July 2025 Friendly	The Spartans	3–2	Ayr United	Edinburgh
19:45	Craigen 23', 59'; Russell 26'	Report	Murphy 7', 30'	Stadium: Ainslie Park

4 July 2025 Ayrshire Derby	Kilmarnock	1–0	Ayr United	Kilmarnock
19:30	Kiltie 46'			Stadium: Rugby Park; Attendance: 5,416
Note: Testimonial match for Rory McKenzie.

=== Scottish Championship ===
1 August 2025 1	Arbroath	1–1	Ayr United	Arbroath
19:45	Todorov 89'	Report	Murphy 5'	Stadium: Gayfield Park; Attendance: 1,578; Referee: Chris Graham

9 August 2025 2	Ayr United	0–1	Raith Rovers	Ayr
15:00		Report	Easton 1'	Stadium: Somerset Park; Attendance: 2,570; Referee: Kevin Clancy

23 August 2025 3	Greenock Morton	2–2	Ayr United	Greenock
15:00	Brophy 23' (pen.), 87'	Report	Holt 55'; McAllister 59'	Stadium: Cappielow; Attendance: 1,877; Referee: Don Robertson

30 August 2025 4	Ayr United	1–1	Queen's Park	Ayr
15:00	Shiels 83' (o.g.)	Report	Fowler 33' (pen.)	Stadium: Somerset Park; Attendance: 1,997; Referee: John Beaton

13 September 2025 5	Ayr United	1–1	Ross County	Ayr
15:00	Walker 2'	Report	Henderson 49'	Stadium: Somerset Park; Attendance: 1,912; Referee: Matthew MacDermid

23 September 2025 6	Dunfermline Athletic	0–1	Ayr United	Dunfermline
15:00	Chilokoa-Mullen (red card) 47'	Report	McKenzie 9'; Watret (red card) 90+2'	Stadium: East End Park; Attendance: 4,910; Referee: Dan McFarlane

27 September 2025 7	Ayr United	4–2	Airdrieonians	Ayr
15:00	Walker 3'; McKenzie 6', 22'; Murphy 39'	Report	McGrattan 28'; Telfer 59'	Stadium: Somerset Park; Attendance: 1,923; Referee: David Dickinson

4 October 2025 8	St Johnstone	0–0	Ayr United	Perth
15:00		Report		Stadium: McDiarmid Park; Attendance: 4,277; Referee: Ryan Lee

11 October 2025 9	Raith Rovers	0–2	Ayr United	Kirkcaldy
15:00		Report	McKenzie 12'; Murphy 32' (pen.)	Stadium: Stark's Park; Attendance: 3,448; Referee: Duncan Nicolson

18 October 2025 10	Ayr United	2–1	Greenock Morton	Ayr
15:00	Rus 45'; Dempsey 87'	Report	Ballantyne 76'	Stadium: Somerset Park; Attendance: 2,135; Referee: Iain Snedden

21 October 2025 11	Partick Thistle	2–1	Ayr United	Glasgow
19:45	Lets'osa 46'; Stanway 50'	Report	Walker 45+2' (red card) 72'	Stadium: Firhill Stadium; Attendance: 3,123; Referee: David Dickinson

25 October 2025 12	Queen's Park	0–0	Ayr United	Glasgow
15:00	Fieldson (red card) 9'	Report		Stadium: Lesser Hampden; Attendance: 886; Referee: Peter Stuart

31 October 2025 13	Ayr United	0–1	Dunfermline Athletic	Ayr
19:45		Report	Stewart 42'	Stadium: Somerset Park; Attendance: 2,015; Referee: Grant Irvine

8 November 2025 14	Ross County	3–3	Ayr United	Dingwall
15:00	Hale 30'; White 32', 51'	Report	Walker 23'; McMann 66'; Main 71'	Stadium: Victoria Park; Attendance: 2,603; Referee: Chris Graham

15 November 2025 15	Ayr United	1–1	Arbroath	Ayr
15:00	Holt 87'	Report	Marshall 12'	Stadium: Somerset Park; Attendance: 2,019; Referee: Colin Steven

22 November 2025 16	Airdrieonians	0–1	Ayr United	Airdrie
15:00		Report	McKenzie 19'; Rus (red card) 59'	Stadium: Excelsior Stadium; Attendance: 1,582; Referee: Sean Murdoch

6 December 2025 17	Ayr United	0–0	Partick Thistle	Ayr
15:00		Report		Stadium: Somerset Park; Attendance: 2,815; Referee: Euan Anderson

12 December 2025 18	Ayr United	2–4	St Johnstone	Ayr
19:45	McKenzie 8'; Murphy 14'	Report	Foulds 47'; McPake 77', 88'; Fotheringham 90+2'	Stadium: Somerset Park; Attendance: 1,946; Referee: Colin Steven

20 December 2025 19	Dunfermline Athletic	2–3	Ayr United	Dunfermline
15:00	Ngwenya 63', 65'	Report	McKenzie 5'; Dowds 26'; King 45+4'	Stadium: East End Park; Attendance: 4,961; Referee: Calum Scott

27 December 2025 20	Greenock Morton	1–1	Ayr United	Greenock
15:00	Lyall 47'	Report	Dowds 25'	Stadium: Cappielow; Attendance: 1,811; Referee: Ross Hardie

10 January 2026 21	Ayr United	1–1	Airdrieonians	Ayr
15:00	Murphy 29' (pen.)	Report	McKinnon 42'	Stadium: Somerset Park; Attendance: 2,007; Referee: Chris Graham

24 January 2026 22	Partick Thistle	2–1	Ayr United	Glasgow
15:00	Chalmers 12'; Samuel 14'	Report	Main 44'	Stadium: Firhill Stadium; Attendance: 3,977; Referee: Grant Irvine

31 January 2026 23	Ayr United	2–1	Raith Rovers	Ayr
15:00	Dempsey 28'; Dowds 57'	Report	Vaughan 77'	Stadium: Somerset Park; Attendance: 2,062; Referee: Ross Hardie

21 February 2026 24	Ayr United	0–0	Ross County	Ayr
15:00		Report		Stadium: Somerset Park; Attendance: 1,921; Referee: Chris Graham

28 February 2026 25	St Johnstone	3–1	Ayr United	Perth
15:00	McAlear 16'; Diabate 42'; Paton 86'	Report	Dick 18'	Stadium: McDiarmid Park; Attendance: 3,961; Referee: Dan McFarlane

3 March 2026 26	Arbroath	1–1	Ayr United	Arbroath
19:45	Marshall 74'	Report	Dowds 86'	Stadium: Gayfield Park; Attendance: 1,077; Referee: Lloyd Wilson

10 March 2026 27	Ayr United	1–2	Queen's Park	Ayr
19:45	Dempsey 82'	Report	Smith 58'; Ruth 88'	Stadium: Somerset Park; Attendance: 1,414; Referee: Colin Steven

14 March 2026 28	Queen's Park	1–1	Ayr United	Glasgow
15:00	Murray 33'	Report	Dowds 24'	Stadium: Lesser Hampden; Attendance: 838; Referee: Ryan Lee

21 March 2026 29	Ayr United	0–1	Greenock Morton	Ayr
15:00		Report	Comrie 3'	Stadium: Somerset Park; Attendance: 1,875; Referee: Sean Murdoch

27 March 2026 30	Raith Rovers	3–0	Ayr United	Kirkcaldy
19:45	Cameron 6', 60'; Chin 67'	Report		Stadium: Stark's Park; Attendance: 3,113; Referee: Colin Steven

4 April 2026 31	Ayr United	1–1	Partick Thistle	Ayr
15:00	Murphy 77' (pen.)	Report	Ashcroft (red card) 58'; Loughrey 69'	Stadium: Somerset Park; Attendance: 3,253; Referee: Ross Hardie

7 April 2026 32	Ayr United	0–3	Dunfermline Athletic	Ayr
19:45		Report	Cooper 1'; Kane 55' (pen.); Bray 86'	Stadium: Somerset Park; Attendance: 2,033; Referee: Duncan Nicolson

11 April 2026 33	Ayr United	1–0	Arbroath	Ayr
19:45	Murphy 77'	Report		Stadium: Somerset Park; Attendance: 1,715; Referee: Peter Stuart

18 April 2026 34	Ross County	2–1	Ayr United	Dingwall
15:00	Duncan 4'; Iacovitti 70'	Report	Dowds 42'	Stadium: Victoria Park; Attendance: 2,712; Referee: Dan McFarlane

25 April 2026 35	Airdrieonians	2–1	Ayr United	Airdrie
15:00	Mahon 68'; McArthur 84'	Report	King 26'	Stadium: Excelsior Stadium; Attendance: 1,478; Referee: Lloyd Wilson

1 May 2026 36	Ayr United	0–1	St Johnstone	Ayr
19:45		Report	Fotheringham 37'	Stadium: Somerset Park; Referee: 2

=== Scottish League Cup ===
==== Group stage ====
15 July 2025 1	Annan Athletic	1–6	Ayr United	Annan
19:45	Smith 70'	Report	Walker 16'; Oakley 41', 46', 47'; Thomas 60'; McRoberts 75'	Stadium: Galabank; Attendance: 527; Referee: Daniel Graves

19 July 2025 2	Ayr United	4–0	Arbroath	Ayr
15:00	Main 19', 49'; Bonnar 74'; Oakley 82'	Report		Stadium: Somerset Park; Attendance: 1,534; Referee: Greg Soutar

22 July 2025 3	Ayr United	3–0	Forfar Athletic	Ayr
19:45	Thomas 3'; Oakley 32'; Main 34'	Report		Stadium: Somerset Park; Attendance: 1,721; Referee: Lloyd Wilson

27 July 2025 4	St Mirren	2–1	Ayr United	Paisley
15:00	Phillips 16', 38'	Report	Holt 65'	Stadium: St Mirren Park; Attendance: 4,174; Referee: Euan Anderson

==== Knockout phase ====
16 August 2025 Second round	Partick Thistle	2–0	Ayr United	Glasgow
15:00	O'Reilly 41'; Chalmers 45+4'	Report		Stadium: Firhill Stadium; Attendance: 3,124; Referee: Ryan Lee

=== Scottish Challenge Cup ===
9 December 2025 Second round	Ayr United	2–1	Peterhead	Ayr
19:45	Dowds 13'; McAllister 49'	Report	Pawlett 27'	Stadium: Somerset Park; Attendance: 581; Referee: Peter Stuart

13 January 2026 Third round	Ayr United	4–1	Stranraer	Ayr
19:45	Main 11'; Dempsey 42' (pen.); Finney 45+1'; Thomas 71'	Report	Hughes 22'	Stadium: Somerset Park; Attendance: 1,158; Referee: Colin Steven

17 February 2026 Quarter-finals	St Johnstone	3–3 (4–5 p)	Ayr United	Falkirk
19:45	McPake 30' (pen.); Smith 89'; Gullan 90+4'	Report	Oakley 15', 29'; Holt 47'	Stadium: Falkirk Stadium; Attendance: 999; Referee: Lloyd Wilson

24 February 2026 Semi-finals	Ayr United	1–2	Inverness CT	Ayr
19:30	Finney 34'	Report	Alonge 27', 82'	Stadium: Somerset Park; Attendance: 1,768; Referee: Peter Stuart

=== Scottish Cup ===
29 November 2025 Third round	Ayr United	3–0	Turriff United	Ayr
15:00	Main 27'; Watret 29'; Thomas 87'	Report		Stadium: Somerset Park; Attendance: 1,147; Referee: Lloyd Wilson

17 January 2026 Fourth round	Dundee United	2–0	Ayr United	Dundee
15:00	Möller 77'; Camará 89'	Report		Stadium: Tannadice Park; Attendance: 4,373; Referee: Ryan Lee

== Squad statistics ==
=== Appearances ===
As of 1 May 2026

No.	Pos	Nat	Player	Total		Championship		League Cup		Challenge Cup		Scottish Cup	
No.	Pos	Nat	Player	Apps	Goals	Apps	Goals	Apps	Goals	Apps	Goals	Apps	Goals
1	GK	(Scotland) SCO	David Mitchell	27	0	21+1	0	5+0	0	0+0	0	0+0	0
2	DF	(Scotland) SCO	Nick McAllister	30	1	16+6	1	4+1	0	2+1	0	0+0	0
3	DF	(Scotland) SCO	Liam Dick	36	1	22+5	1	4+1	0	2+1	0	1+0	0
4	DF	(Scotland) SCO	Shaun Want	19	0	2+8	0	5+0	0	2+1	0	1+0	0
5	DF	(Scotland) SCO	Kevin Holt	39	4	32+0	2	3+0	1	2+1	1	1+0	0
6	MF	(Scotland) SCO	Stuart Bannigan	35	0	21+7	0	1+0	0	4+0	0	2+0	0
7	FW	(Scotland) SCO	Anton Dowds	31	7	15+11	6	0+0	0	3+0	1	2+0	0
8	MF	(England) ENG	Ben Dempsey	31	4	24+3	3	0+0	0	2+0	1	2+0	0
9	FW	(England) ENG	George Oakley	20	6	6+7	0	3+2	4	2+0	2	0+0	0
11	MF	(Scotland) SCO	Dom Thomas	16	4	1+6	0	4+1	2	1+1	1	1+1	1
12	MF	(England) ENG	Francis Turley	7	0	3+4	0	0+0	0	0+0	0	0+0	0
14	MF	(Scotland) SCO	Kyle Ure	19	0	13+3	0	2+1	0	0+0	0	0+0	0
15	FW	(Scotland) SCO	Jamie Murphy	29	7	21+3	7	3+0	0	0+0	0	2+0	0
16	MF	(Scotland) SCO	Ben Summers	16	0	8+7	0	0+0	0	0+0	0	0+1	0
17	MF	(Scotland) SCO	Jude Bonnar	30	1	9+12	0	2+2	1	2+1	0	0+2	0
18	MF	(Scotland) SCO	Jamie Hislop	11	0	2+5	0	0+2	0	0+2	0	0+0	0
20	DF	(Scotland) SCO	Leon King	33	2	27+0	2	0+0	0	4+0	0	2+0	0
21	MF	(England) ENG	Ethan Walker	26	5	16+3	4	4+0	1	2+1	0	0+0	0
22	FW	(Scotland) SCO	Mark McKenzie	41	7	30+1	7	5+0	0	3+0	0	1+1	0
23	MF	(Romania) ROU	Marco Rus	36	1	25+4	1	3+2	0	1+0	0	1+0	0
26	FW	(New Zealand) NZL	Matthew Warbrick	1	0	0+0	0	0+0	0	0+0	0	0+1	0
29	FW	(Scotland) SCO	Lucas McRoberts	13	1	1+8	0	0+2	1	0+2	0	0+0	0
31	GK	(England) ENG	Max Thompson	10	0	8+0	0	0+0	0	2+0	0	0+0	0
32	MF	(Scotland) SCO	Dylan Watret	22	1	10+9	0	1+1	0	0+0	0	1+0	1
33	DF	(Scotland) SCO	Scott McMann	46	1	36+0	1	3+1	0	4+0	0	1+1	0
34	MF	(Scotland) SCO	Jack Simpson	4	0	0+1	0	0+0	0	0+3	0	0+0	0
38	GK	(Scotland) SCO	Liam Russell	11	0	7+0	0	0+0	0	2+0	0	2+0	0
55	DF	(England) ENG	George Finney	16	2	8+4	0	0+0	0	3+0	2	1+0	0
Players who left the club during the 2025–26 season
10	FW	(England) ENG	Curtis Main	24	7	6+10	2	3+2	3	1+0	1	1+1	1
12	MF	(Scotland) SCO	Aaron Brown	4	0	0+1	0	0+0	0	0+2	0	0+1	0
16	FW	(Scotland) SCO	Jake Hastie	8	0	0+5	0	0+3	0	0+0	0	0+0	0
19	GK	(Scotland) SCO	Ollie Ecrepont	0	0	0+0	0	0+0	0	0+0	0	0+0	0
24	MF	(Scotland) SCO	Scott Tomlinson	0	0	0+0	0	0+0	0	0+0	0	0+0	0
25	MF	(Scotland) SCO	Kenzie Mitchell	1	0	0+0	0	0+1	0	0+0	0	0+0	0
28	MF	(Scotland) SCO	David Craig	0	0	0+0	0	0+0	0	0+0	0	0+0	0

== Team statistics ==
=== League table ===
Pos	Team	Pld	W	D	L	GF	GA	GD	Pts	Promotion, qualification or relegation
5	Raith Rovers	36	12	9	15	43	42	+1	45	
6	Queen's Park	36	9	14	13	35	48	−13	41	
7	Ayr United	36	8	15	13	38	47	−9	39	
8	Greenock Morton	36	8	14	14	36	52	−16	38	
9	Airdrieonians (R)	36	8	12	16	35	49	−14	36	Qualification for the Championship play-offs

Rules for classification: 1) Points; 2) Goal difference; 3) Goals scored; 4) Head-to head points; 5) Head-to-head goal difference; 6) Play-off (only for deciding promotion, play-off participation and relegation).
(R) Relegated

=== League Cup table ===
Pos	Team	Pld	W	PW	PL	L	GF	GA	GD	Pts	Qualification	STM	AYR	ARB	FOR	ANN
1	St Mirren	4	3	0	1	0	12	4	+8	10	Qualification for the second round	—	2–1	—	—	8–2
2	Ayr United	4	3	0	0	1	14	3	+11	9	Qualification for the second round	—	—	4–0	3–0	—
3	Arbroath	4	1	1	0	2	6	5	+1	5		p0–0	—	—	—	6–0
4	Forfar Athletic	4	1	1	0	2	3	6	−3	5		1–2	—	1–0	—	—
5	Annan Athletic	4	0	0	1	3	4	21	−17	1		—	1–6	—	1–1p	—

Rules for classification: 1) goal difference, 2) goals scored, 3) away goals scored, 4) matches won, 5) away matches won, 6) drawing of lots.

== Transfers ==
=== Transfers in ===
Date	Position	Name	From	Fee	Ref.
4 June 2025	GK	David Mitchell	Partick Thistle	Free transfer	
16 June 2025	DF	Liam Dick	Raith Rovers	Free transfer	
16 June 2025	DF	Shaun Want	(Northern Ireland) Larne	Free transfer	
18 June 2025	MF	Stuart Bannigan	Partick Thistle	Free transfer	
24 June 2025	MF	Dom Thomas	(Republic of Ireland) Derry City	Free transfer	
17 July 2025	DF	Kevin Holt	(Republic of Ireland) Derry City	Undisclosed	
15 August 2025	FW	(New Zealand) Matthew Warbrick	St Cadoc's	Free transfer	

=== Transfers out ===
Date	Position	Name	To	Fee	Ref.
20 May 2025	GK	Robbie Mutch	Cove Rangers	Free transfer	
20 May 2025	DF	(Zambia) Frankie Musonda		Free transfer	
20 May 2025	FW	Max Guthrie	Stenhousemuir	Free transfer	
9 June 2025	MF	Connor McLennan	Livingston	Free transfer	
17 June 2025	DF	Patrick Reading	Partick Thistle	Free transfer	
19 June 2025	DF	(New Zealand) George Stanger	Kilmarnock	Free transfer	
5 July 2025	FW	Fraser Bryden	(Northern Ireland) Crusaders	Free transfer	
1 January 2026	FW	Jake Hastie	Airdrieonians	Free transfer	
24 January 2026	FW	Aaron Brown	Dumbarton	Free transfer	

=== Loans in ===
Date	Position	Name	From	End date	Ref.
19 July 2025	MF	Jude Bonnar	Celtic	Co-operation loan	
27 July 2025	MF	Kyle Ure	Celtic	Co-operation loan	
7 September 2025	DF	Leon King	Rangers	Loan	
13 January 2026	DF	(England) George Finney	(England) Everton	Loan	
16 January 2026	MF	Ben Summers	Celtic	Loan	
26 January 2026	GK	(England) Max Thompson	(England) Newcastle United	Loan	
27 February 2026	MF	(England) Francis Turley	Celtic	Loan	

=== Loans out ===
Date	Position	Name	To	End date	Ref.
13 June 2025	MF	Jamie Hislop	East Stirlingshire	Co-operation loan	
13 June 2025	MF	Kenzie Mitchell	East Stirlingshire	Co-operation loan	
13 June 2025	FW	Lucas McRoberts	East Stirlingshire	Co-operation loan	
16 June 2025	MF	David Craig	Glenafton Athletic	31 May 2026	
26 June 2025	GK	Ollie Ecrepont	Dumbarton	1 January 2026	
4 July 2025	MF	Scott Tomlinson	Dumbarton	31 May 2026	
1 October 2025	FW	Jake Hastie	Airdrieonians	1 January 2026	
22 January 2026	GK	Ollie Ecrepont	Glenafton Athletic	31 May 2026	
2 February 2026	FW	(England) Curtis Main	Greenock Morton	31 May 2026	
