= Anton Dowds =

Scottish footballer

Personal information
- Date of birth: 19 November 1996 (age 29)
- Place of birth: Edinburgh, Scotland
- Position: Forward

Team information
- Current team: Raith Rovers
- Number: 19

Senior career*
Years	Team	Apps	(Gls)
2018–2020	East Fife	60	(13)
2020–2022	Falkirk	30	(9)
2021–2022	→ Arbroath (loan)	17	(5)
2022–2024	Partick Thistle	26	(6)
2023–2024	→ Ayr United (loan)	28	(13)
2024–2026	Ayr United	25	(6)
2026-	Raith Rovers	0	(0)
- * Club domestic league appearances and goals as of 4 May 2026

Anton Dowds (born 19 November 1996) is a Scottish footballer who plays as a forward for Raith Rovers.

== Career ==
=== Early career ===
Dowds joined East Fife in 2018 from Heriot Watt University where he picked up end of season awards as Player and Coaches' Player of the Year as well as top scorer. Dowds was named the League One player of the month for January 2019, scoring four goals and assisting another. Following a successful first season at East Fife, where he finished as the club's top scorer, Dowds signed a contract extension until 2020.

On 20 July 2020, Dowds moved to League One rivals Falkirk, signing a full-time professional contract.

With his deal due to expire Falkirk, Dowds signed a pre-contract agreement with Partick Thistle in the Scottish Championship on 13 June 2022. He made his debut for the club in a 2–0 home victory over Fraserburgh in the Scottish League Cup. In his first season at the club, he scored seven goals in 35 appearances across all competitions.

=== Ayr United ===
On 12 September 2023, Dowds joined Ayr United on loan from Partick Thistle for the remainder of the 2023–24 season. Dowds scored a hat-trick for Ayr United in a 3–2 away victory over Airdrieonians on 17 February 2024 in the league.

On 25 May 2024, Dowds signed a one-year deal with Ayr United following a successful loan spell.

Dowds started the 2024–25 season in fine form, scoring four goals in his first five league outings to send his club to the top of the table. He was recognized with the SPFL Championship player of the month award for August 2024 for his efforts. In October 2024, Dowds underwent season-ending surgery to repair a ruptured cruciate ligament.

== Career statistics ==
As of match played 27 December 2025

Appearances and goals by club, season and competition
Club	Season	League			Scottish Cup		League Cup		Other		Total	
Club	Season	Division	Apps	Goals	Apps	Goals	Apps	Goals	Apps	Goals	Apps	Goals
East Fife	2018–19	Scottish League One	32	7	3	1	3	1	4 (Note: Appearance(s) in Scottish Challenge Cup)	3	42	12
East Fife	2019–20	Scottish League One	28	6	1	1	5	0	1	0	35	7
East Fife	Total		60	13	4	2	8	1	5	3	77	19
Falkirk	2020–21	Scottish League One	17	2	2	0	4	1	0	0	23	3
Falkirk	2021–22	Scottish League One	13	7	0	0	2	0	0	0	15	7
Falkirk	Total		30	9	2	0	6	1	0	0	38	10
Arbroath (loan)	2021–22	Scottish Championship	17	5	0	0	0	0	1	0	18	5
Partick Thistle	2022–23	Scottish Championship	25	6	3	1	4	0	3 (Note: Appearances in Scottish Premiership play-offs)	0	35	7
Partick Thistle	2023–24	Scottish Championship	1	0	0	0	3	0	0	0	4	0
Partick Thistle	Total		26	6	3	1	7	0	3	0	39	7
Ayr United (loan)	2023–24	Scottish Championship	28	13	3	0	–		–		31	13
Ayr United	2024–25	Scottish Championship	6	5	0	0	4	2	1	2	11	9
Ayr United	2025–26	Scottish Championship	14	2	1	0	0	0	1	1	16	3
Ayr United	Total		20	7	1	0	4	2	2	3	27	12
Career total			181	53	13	3	25	4	11	6	230	66

== Honours ==
Individual

- Scottish Championship Player of the Month: August 2024
- Scottish League One Player of the Month: January 2019
