= 2021–22 Arbroath F.C. season =

Arbroath
2020–21 season
- Chairman: Mike Caird
- Manager: Dick Campbell
- Stadium: Gayfield Park
- Scottish Championship: 2nd
- Premiership Playoff: Semi-final
- Scottish League Cup: Second round
- Scottish Challenge Cup: Second round
- Scottish Cup: Fifth round
- Top goalscorer: League: Michael McKenna (15); All: Michael McKenna (15)
- Highest home attendance: 5,154 vs. Inverness CT, Premiership play-off, 13 May 2022
- Lowest home attendance: 460 vs. East Fife, League Cup, 14 July 2021
- Average home league attendance: 1,400
Home colours	Away colours

The 2021–22 season was Arbroath's third consecutive season in the Scottish Championship, following their promotion from Scottish League One in the 2018–19 season. They also competed in the Scottish League Cup, Scottish Challenge Cup and the Scottish Cup.

== Season summary ==
In May 2021, the SPFL confirmed the return of the Scottish Challenge Cup after being scrapped for the 2020–21 season however, teams from Wales, Northern Ireland and the Republic of Ireland would not be included to reduce unnecessary travel during the COVID-19 pandemic.

== Competitions ==
=== Pre-season and friendlies ===
Date	Opponent	Venue	Result (Note: Arbroath's score written first)	Scorers	Attendance	Ref.
26 June 2021	Montrose	Away	1–1			
30 June 2021	Crossgates Primrose	Away	3–1			
2 July 2021	Bo'ness Athletic	Away	2–2			

=== Scottish Championship ===
Win	Draw	Loss

Date	Opponent	Venue	Result	Scorers	Attendance	Ref.
31 July 2021	Inverness Caledonian Thistle	Home	0–1		1,008	
7 August 2021	Ayr United	Away	2–2	Nouble 10', McKenna 28'	1,244	
21 August 2021	Partick Thistle	Home	3–1	McKenna 45', 54' Low 58'	1,585	
28 August 2021	Dunfermline Athletic	Away	3–0	McKenna 12', 67' Gold 44'	2,928	
11 September 2021	Hamilton Academical	Home	4–0	Stewart 45+2', McKenna 57', Nouble 80', Low 85'	1,234	
18 September 2021	Queen of the South	Away	2–0	O'Brien 16', Nouble 79'	1,174	
24 September 2021	Kilmarnock	Home	0–0		2,410	
2 October 2021	Greenock Morton	Away	2–2	Chr. Hamilton 43', McKenna 87' pen.	1,126	
16 October 2021	Raith Rovers	Away	1–2	Dowds 90+4'	1,748	
23 October 2021	Ayr United	Home	1–1	McKenna 56'	1,415	
26 October 2021	Inverness Caledonian Thistle	Away	1–0	McKenna 54'	1,909	
30 October 2021	Dunfermline Athletic	Home	4–2	O'Brien 15', Nouble 37', Linn 77', McKenna 85' pen.	1,359	
6 November 2021	Hamilton Academical	Away	1–1	O'Brien 90+1'	1,107	
13 November 2021	Queen of the South	Home	1–1	McKenna 67'	1,408	
20 November 2021	Kilmarnock	Away	1–0	Dowds 85'	4,242	
4 December 2021	Raith Rovers	Home	0–0		1,539	
11 December 2021	Partick Thistle	Away	2–0	Dowds 45' Henderson 78'		
18 December 2021	Greenock Morton	Home	2–1	Chr. Hamilton 48', Dowds 80'	1,220	
26 December 2021	Dunfermline Athletic	Away	3–0	Breen 6' o.g., McKenna 45', Dowds 81'	500	
2 January 2022	Inverness Caledonian Thistle	Home	0–0		500	
8 January 2022	Ayr United	Away	0–1		500	
15 January 2022	Raith Rovers	Away	2–1	J.Hamilton 47', Low 82' pen.	500	
4 February 2022	Kilmarnock	Home	1–0	J.Hamilton 56'	2,803	
9 February 2022	Hamilton Academical	Home	2–2	Low 38' pen., McKenna 90+1' pen.	1,213	
19 February 2022	Queen of the South	Away	0–0		1,067	
26 February 2022	Greenock Morton	Away	0–0		1,696	
1 March 2022	Partick Thistle	Home	1–1	Co. Hamilton 6'	1,648	
5 March 2022	Dunfermline Athletic	Home	1–0	Gold 9'	2,141	
12 March 2022	Inverness Caledonian Thistle	Away	0–3		2,149	
19 March 2022	Ayr United	Home	1–0	Co. Hamilton 50'	1,727	
26 March 2022	Raith Rovers	Home	3–3	J. Hamilton 1', Hilson 67', McKenna 70'	2,118	
2 April 2022	Partick Thistle	Away	0–0		2,810	
9 April 2022	Hamilton Academical	Away	1–0	J.Hamilton 59'	911	
16 April 2022	Queen of the South	Home	5–1	Col. Hamilton 25', J.Hamilton 37', 59', Cameron 54' o.g., Craigen 90'	2,413	
22 April 2022	Kilmarnock	Away	1–2	Craigen 9'	11,500	
29 April 2022	Greenock Morton	Home	3–0	Thomson 16', Craigen 78', McKenna 85'	3,121	

=== Premiership play-off ===
Win	Draw	Loss

Round	Date	Opponent	Venue	Result	Scorers	Attendance	Ref.
Semi-final 1st Leg	10 May 2022	Inverness Caledonian Thistle	Away	0–0		2,201	
Semi-final 2nd Leg	13 May 2022	Inverness Caledonian Thistle	Home	0–0 (a.e.t) (3–5p)		5,154	

=== Scottish League Cup ===
==== Group stage ====
Win	Draw	Loss

Date	Opponent	Venue	Result	Scorers	Attendance	Ref.
10 July 2021	Elgin City	Away	1–0	Donnelly 80'	220	
14 July 2021	East Fife	Home	2–0	Hilson 71', Donnelly 89'	460	
17 July 2021	Dundee United	Away	0–1		286	
24 July 2021	Kelty Hearts	Home	3–2	Donnelly 31', C.Hamilton 52', Low 58' pen.	626	

==== Knockout phase ====
Win	Draw	Loss

Round	Date	Opponent	Venue	Result	Scorers	Attendance	Ref.
Second round	15 August 2021	St Johnstone	Home	2–2 (2–3 P)	Nouble 31', O'Brien 90+3'	1,842	

=== Scottish Challenge Cup ===
Win	Draw	Loss

Round	Date	Opponent	Venue	Result	Scorers	Attendance	Ref.
Second round	4 September 2021	Aberdeen B	Away	1–1 (1–4 P)	C.Hamilton 90+4'	650	

=== Scottish Cup ===
Win	Draw	Loss

Round	Date	Opponent	Venue	Result	Scorers	Attendance	Ref.
Third round	27 November 2021	Forfar Athletic	Home	3–0	Thomson 8', Little 20', Donnelly 53'	1,280	
Fourth round	22 January 2022	Darvel	Home	3–0	J.Hamilton 28', 68', 90'	1,106	
Fifth round	13 February 2022	Hibernian	Home	1–3	Wighton 6'	4,049	

== Player statistics ==
=== Appearances and goals ===
As of 13 May 2022

No.	Pos	Player	Championship		League Cup		Challenge Cup		Scottish Cup		Total	
No.	Pos	Player	Apps	Goals	Apps	Goals	Apps	Goals	Apps	Goals	Apps	Goals
1	GK	(Scotland) Derek Gaston	35	0	3	0	0	0	3	0	41	0
2	DF	(Scotland) Jason Thomson	18+4	1	0	0	1	0	3	0	26	1
3	DF	(Scotland) Colin Hamilton	36	4	5	2+1	0+1	0	3	0	45	7
4	DF	(Scotland) Ricky Little	35	0	5	0	0	0	3	1	43	1
5	DF	(Scotland) Thomas O'Brien	36	3	2	1	0+1	0	3	0	42	4
6	MF	(Scotland) Nicky Low	18+3	4	5	1	1	0	0+1	0	28	5
7	MF	(Scotland) David Gold	10+16	2	2+3	0	1	0	0	0	32	2
8	MF	(Scotland) Michael McKenna	35+1	15	3+2	0	0+1	0	3	0	45	15
9	FW	(Scotland) Dale Hilson	5+18	1	3+2	1	1	0	0+1	0	30	2
10	MF	(Scotland) Gavin Swankie	1+5	0	1+3	0	0	0	0+1	0	11	0
11	MF	(Scotland) Bobby Linn	5+19	1	3+2	0	0	0	1+1	0	31	1
12	DF	(Scotland) Scott Stewart	35+2	1	5	0	0+1	0	3	0	46	1
15	FW	(Scotland) Luke Donnelly	12+14	0	3+2	3	1	0	1+2	1	35	4
16	FW	(England) Sam Ford	1+4	0	0	0	0	0	0+1	0	6	0
17	FW	(England) Michael Bakare	1+1	0	0	0	0	0	0	0+1	2	1
18	DF	(Scotland) Chris Hamilton	29+1	0	1	0	0	0	3	0	34	0
19	FW	(Scotland) Craig Wighton	9+5	0	0	0	0	0	2	1	16	1
20	FW	(Scotland) Jack Hamilton	16+2	7	0	0	0	0	2	3	20	10
21	GK	(Wales) Calum Antell	3	0	2	0	1	0	0	0	6	0
22	DF	(Scotland) Liam Henderson	20+7	1	3+1	0	1	1	2	0	34	2
28	MF	(England) James Craigen	18+17	3	3+1	0	0+1	0	1+1	0	42	3
Players who left the club during the 2021–22 season
14	MF	(Scotland) Dylan Paterson	0+2	0	0+3	0	1	0	0	0	6	0
16	DF	(England) Harrison Clark	7+1	0	4+1	0	1	0	0+1	0	15	0
17	FW	(England) Joel Nouble	20	4	2+1	1	0	0	0	0	23	5
19	FW	(Scotland) Anton Dowds	9+8	5	2+1	0	1	0	0	0	21	5

== Team statistics ==
=== League table ===
Pos	Team	Pld	W	D	L	GF	GA	GD	Pts	Promotion, qualification or relegation
1	Kilmarnock (C, P)	36	20	7	9	50	27	+23	67	Promotion to the Premiership
2	Arbroath	36	17	14	5	54	28	+26	65	Qualification for the Premiership play-off semi-final
3	Inverness Caledonian Thistle	36	16	11	9	53	34	+19	59	Qualification for the Premiership play-off quarter-final
4	Partick Thistle	36	14	10	12	46	40	+6	52	Qualification for the Premiership play-off quarter-final
5	Raith Rovers	36	12	14	10	44	44	0	50	

Rules for classification: 1) Points; 2) Goal difference; 3) Goals scored; 4) Head-to-to head points; 5) Head-to-head goal difference; 6) Play-off (only for deciding promotion, play-off participation and relegation).
(C) Champions; (P) Promoted

=== League cup table ===
Pos	Team	Pld	W	PW	PL	L	GF	GA	GD	Pts	Qualification	DUN	ARB	KEL	ELG	EFI
1	Dundee United	4	4	0	0	0	9	1	+8	12	Qualification for the second round	—	1–0	—	6–1	—
2	Arbroath	4	3	0	0	1	6	3	+3	9	Qualification for the second round	—	—	3–2	—	2–0
3	Kelty Hearts	4	2	0	0	2	8	5	+3	6		0–1	—	—	—	3–0
4	Elgin City	4	1	0	0	3	5	12	−7	3		—	0–1	1–3	—	—
5	East Fife	4	0	0	0	4	2	9	−7	0		0–1	—	—	2–3	—

Rules for classification: 1) goal difference, 2) goals scored, 3) away goals scored, 4) matches won, 5) away matches won, 6) drawing of lots.

== Transfers ==
=== Transfers in ===
Date	Position	Name	From	Fee	Ref.
6 May 2021	MF	Nicky Low	East Stirlingshire	Free transfer	
30 May 2021	DF	Liam Henderson	Edinburgh City	Free transfer	
11 June 2021	GK	(Wales) Calum Antell	Edinburgh City	Free transfer	
24 June 2021	MF	Dylan Paterson	Bo'ness Athletic	Free transfer	
31 January 2022	FW	(England) Sam Ford	(England) Felixstowe & Walton United	Free transfer	
11 February 2022	FW	(England) Michael Bakare	(England) Leatherhead	Free transfer	

=== Transfers out ===
Date	Position	Name	To	Fee	Ref.
7 May 2021	FW	Kris Doolan	Free Agent	Free transfer	
7 May 2021	GK	Scott Gallacher	East Fife	Free transfer	
13 May 2021	MF	Mark Whatley	Montrose	Free transfer	

=== Loans in ===
Date	Position	Name	From	End date	Ref.
10 July 2021	MF	(England) Harrison Clark	Livingston	1 January 2022	
13 July 2021	FW	(England) Joel Nouble	Livingston	1 January 2022	
22 July 2021	DF	Chris Hamilton	Heart of Midlothian	31 May 2022	
17 August 2021	FW	Anton Dowds	Falkirk	1 January 2022	
1 January 2022	FW	Jack Hamilton	Livingston	31 May 2022	
14 January 2022	FW	Craig Wighton	Dunfermline Athletic	31 May 2022	

=== Loans out ===
Date	Position	Name	To	End date	Ref.
4 November 2021	MF	Dylan Paterson	Bo'ness Athletic	1 January 2022	
28 January 2022	MF	Dylan Paterson	Stirling Albion	31 May 2022	
