= Aidan Keena =

Irish footballer (born 1999)

Personal information
- Date of birth: 25 April 1999 (age 27)
- Place of birth: Mullingar, Ireland
- Position: Forward

Team information
- Current team: St Patrick's Athletic
- Number: 9

Youth career
- Mullingar Athletic
- 2015: Shelbourne
- 2016–2017: St Patrick's Athletic

Senior career*
Years	Team	Apps	(Gls)
2017	St Patrick's Athletic	3	(0)
2017–2020	Heart of Midlothian	11	(0)
2018	→ Queen's Park (loan)	14	(8)
2018–2019	→ Dunfermline Athletic (loan)	12	(4)
2020	Hartlepool United	8	(2)
2020–2022	Falkirk	32	(6)
2022–2023	Sligo Rovers	32	(18)
2023–2024	Cheltenham Town	60	(7)
2024–	St Patrick's Athletic	63	(21)

International career^{‡}
2015	Republic of Ireland U17	2	(0)
2016–2017	Republic of Ireland U18	4	(0)
2018	Republic of Ireland U19	1	(0)
2019	Republic of Ireland U21	2	(0)
- * Club domestic league appearances and goals as of 23:40, 30 October 2026 (UTC) ‡ National team caps and goals as of 01:47, 17 June 2025 (UTC)

Aidan Keena (born 25 April 1999) is an Irish footballer who plays as a forward for League of Ireland Premier Division club St Patrick's Athletic. He has previously played for Heart of Midlothian, Hartlepool United, Queen's Park, Dunfermline Athletic, Falkirk, Sligo Rovers and Cheltenham Town.

== Club career ==
=== St Patrick's Athletic ===
Keena, a member of the St Patrick's Athletic under 19's squad, was called up to the first team by manager Liam Buckley for pre-season in January 2017 despite being just 17 years old. He scored on his first team debut, in a 5–0 win over Bluebell United in a friendly. Keena made his first official appearance in senior football on 24 February 2017 when he came on as a 67th-minute substitute in the Saints opening game of the season against Bray Wanderers. With Pats trailing 2–0, Kenna set up Graham Kelly for an 85th-minute goal before being shown a straight red card in the 91st minute for a late tackle on Dylan Connolly. Keena went on to make four more appearances for the club (two league and two League Cup) in the 2017 season, with the last of those being a Dublin Derby against Bohemians on 16 June 2017.

=== Heart of Midlothian ===
Keena was signed by Heart of Midlothian in August 2017. After impressing first team staff with his goalscoring form for the reserves, he was called up to the first team and made his debut as a late substitute in a 1–1 draw versus Partick Thistle at Tynecastle Park on 19 November 2017. Keena was loaned to Scottish League One club Queen's Park in January 2018. In August 2018, he joined Dunfermline Athletic in the Scottish Championship on a season-long loan. After a promising few months with Dunfermline, Keena was recalled to Hearts in January 2019, scoring his first goal for the club in a 4–0 victory against Auchinleck Talbot in the Scottish Cup.

=== Hartlepool United ===
Keena left Hearts in January 2020 and signed for Hartlepool United. Prior to this, Keena had unsuccessful trials with Darlington and Berwick Rangers. He scored his first goal for the club in a 2–0 win against Stockport County on 25 January 2020.

=== Falkirk ===
After leaving Hartlepool, Keena returned to Scotland and signed a two-year deal with Scottish League One side Falkirk on 5 August 2020. On 24 January 2022, it was announced that Keena had left Falkirk by mutual consent after 8 goals in 38 appearances for the club.

=== Sligo Rovers ===
On 24 January 2022, Keena signed for League of Ireland Premier Division club Sligo Rovers and quickly established himself. Keena made his debut on 25 February 2022, scoring the winner in a 2–1 victory away to his first senior club St Patrick's Athletic. On 14 March 2022, he scored a hat-trick in a 3–1 win over Finn Harps at The Showgrounds. Keena was named League of Ireland Player of the Month for March 2022, following a great start to life at his new club, scoring 5 goals in his first 6 appearances. He scored a brace in a 3–1 win at home to Shelbourne on 2 July 2022, his 10th and 11th goals of the season, to return to the top of the goal scoring charts in the league. On 7 July 2022, he scored on his debut in European football, scoring the equaliser in a 2–1 win away to Wales side Bala Town in the UEFA Europa Conference League. On 21 July 2022, Keena scored the winning goal in a 1–0 victory away to Motherwell in the UEFA Europa Conference League. He was named League of Ireland Player of the Month for July 2022, his second time winning the award. Keena finished the 2022 season as League of Ireland Premier Division top goalscorer with 18 goals. He ended the 2022 season with 21 goals in all competitions, two in the UEFA Conference League, one in the FAI Cup and eighteen in the league. He played a huge role in the attack for Rovers that year, also contributing 5 assists. Despite finishing as the top goalscorer and with 2 Player of the Month awards, he was not nominated for PFAI Players' Player of the Year.

=== Cheltenham Town ===
On 29 January 2023, Keena signed for Cheltenham Town for an undisclosed fee, reported as surpassing the club's previous record transfer of £50,000. On 18 March 2023, Keena scored his first goal for the club, in a 3–1 win at home to Exeter City. He scored a total of 7 goals in 66 appearances in all competitions during his time with the club.

=== Return to St Patrick's Athletic ===
==== 2024 season ====
On 28 July 2024, Keena returned to his first senior club, St Patrick's Athletic. He made his debut on 4 August 2024, scoring a penalty in a 3–2 win over his former club Sligo Rovers. On 21 September 2024, Keena came off the bench to score the third goal of the game in a 3–0 win over Waterford. On 18 October 2024, he scored both his sides goals in a 2–1 win over Galway United. On 1 November 2024, Keena opened the scoring in 2–0 win over Sligo Rovers as his side won a record equaling 9 league games in a row to secure 3rd position in the table and UEFA Conference League football for the following season.

==== 2025 season ====
Keena scored his first goal of the 2025 season in his sides first game of the season on 18 January 2025, coming off the bench for Conor Carty at half time, before scoring the second goal in a 2–0 win away to Inchicore Athletic in the Leinster Senior Cup. He scored his first league goal of the season on 21 February 2025 away to Galway United, with an incredible left footed volley on the turn, having controlled the ball with his right foot with his back to goal. The following week he scored twice in a 4–3 win against his former club Sligo Rovers at Richmond Park, including a 79th-minute winner a minute after his side had conceded an equaliser. On 3 March 2025, he scored both of his side's goals in a 2–0 win at home to Derry City to make it 5 goals in his last 3 games. On 12 March 2025, he was named League of Ireland Player of the Month for February 2025, his third time winning the award in his career. On 14 March 2025, Keena suffered a hamstring injury in a 3–0 win over Bohemians with the recovery period due to keep him out of action for 12 weeks. On 2 May 2025, he made his return from injury much earlier than an anticipated, with an immediate impact as he assisted Kian Leavy's goal in a 2–0 win at home to Galway United that put his side top of the league table. On 30 May 2025, he scored the only goal of the game in a 1–0 win over his former club Sligo Rovers at The Showgrounds, his 5th goal in 4 games against them. On 10 July 2025, Keena scored his first European goal for the club, coming off the bench in the 74th minute at home to Hegelmann of Lithuania in the UEFA Conference League 7 minutes before scoring from the penalty spot to secure a 1–0 win for his side. On 20 July 2025, he scored the third goal in an 8–0 win over UCC in the FAI Cup. On 31 July 2025, Keena was forced off with a Quad injury away to Nõmme Kalju in a UEFA Conference League tie in Estonia, with the recovery period seeing him out of action for 3 months. He returned to the side in late October, coming off the bench in the final two league games of the season as well as starting and scoring in the Leinster Senior Cup Final, a 2–1 defeat to Dundalk.

==== 2026 season ====
Keena scored his first goals of the season on 25 January 2026, with a brace in a 5–0 win over Longford Town in the Leinster Senior Cup. On 27 February 2026, he scored his first league goal of the season, coming off the bench to score his side's final goal of the game in a 4–0 win over Dundalk at Richmond Park. On 13 March 2026, he came off the bench to give his side the lead from the penalty spot in an eventual 4–1 win at home to Drogheda United. On 28 March 2026, he scored a hat-trick in a 5–3 win over Montpelier in the Leinster Senior Cup. On 17 April 2026, he scored the quickest goal of his career, chipping the ball into the top corner from 20 yards after 36 seconds in an eventual 3–1 win away to Drogheda United. On 3 July 2026, he scored his side's third goal in a 3–0 victory at home to Galway United. On 10 July 2026, he scored his 10th goal of the season in all competitions, earning his side a point by winning and scoring a 95th-minute penalty in a 1–1 draw away to Waterford at the RSC. On 17 July 2026, he scored for the third consecutive game, with a 90th-minute winner against Wexford in the FAI Cup. On 2 August 2026, he opened the scoring in a 1–1 draw at home to Derry City. On 16 August 2026, he scored a 94th-minute equaliser from the penalty spot a 3–2 win over Shamrock Rovers after extra time in the Third Round of the FAI Cup in which he was also named Man of The Match. On 11 September 2026, he scored his side's second goal in a 2–0 league victory at home to leaders Shamrock Rovers. 3 days later he scored the two opening goals in a 4–0 win away to Dundalk to put his side top of the league with 5 games to go in the season. On 19 September 2026, he scored for the third successive game, in a crucial 1–0 victory away to his former side Sligo Rovers which put his side top of the table with 4 games left to play in the season. He was named League of Ireland Player of the Month for the fourth time in his career, for the month of September 2026.

== International career ==
Keena has represented the Republic of Ireland at under-17, under-18, under-19 and under-21 level. On 6 November 2019, Keena was announced in Stephen Kenny's Republic of Ireland U21 side for the first time, for their European Under-21 Championship qualification games against Armenia U21 & Sweden U21.

== Career statistics ==
As of match played 30 October 2026

Season	Club	League			National Cup (Note: Includes FAI Cup, Scottish Cup & FA Cup)		League Cup (Note: Includes League of Ireland Cup, Scottish League Cup & EFL Cup)		Europe		Other		Total	
Season	Club	Division	Apps	Goals	Apps	Goals	Apps	Goals	Apps	Goals	Apps	Goals	Apps	Goals
St Patrick's Athletic	2017	LOI Premier Division	3	0	0	0	2	0	—		0 (Note: Appearances in Leinster Senior Cup)	0	5	0
Heart of Midlothian	2017–18	Scottish Premiership	1	0	0	0	0	0	—		—		1	0
Heart of Midlothian	2018–19	Scottish Premiership	5	0	2	1	1	0	—		1 (Note: Appearances for Hearts under-21s in Scottish Challenge Cup in which age-restricted sides from the Scottish Premiership clubs compete against senior clubs)	1	9	2
Heart of Midlothian	2019–20	Scottish Premiership	5	0	0	0	4	0	—		3	3	12	3
Heart of Midlothian	Total		11	0	2	1	5	0	—		4	4	22	5
Queen's Park (loan)	2017–18	Scottish League One	14	8	—		—		—		2 (Note: Appearances in Scottish League One play-offs)	0	16	8
Dunfermline Athletic (loan)	2018–19	Scottish Championship	12	4	—		—		—		0 (Note: Appearances in Scottish Challenge Cup)	0	12	4
Hartlepool United	2019–20	National League	8	2	—		—		—		—		8	2
Falkirk	2020–21	Scottish League One	11	1	1	0	2	1	—		—		14	2
Falkirk	2021–22	Scottish League One	21	5	1	0	1	0	—		1	1	24	6
Falkirk	Total		32	6	2	0	3	1	—		1	1	38	8
Sligo Rovers	2022	LOI Premier Division	32	18	1	1	—		5 (Note: Appearances in UEFA Europa Conference League)	2	—		38	21
Cheltenham Town	2022–23	EFL League One	19	6	—		—		—		1 (Note: Appearances in EFL Trophy)	0	20	6
Cheltenham Town	2023–24	EFL League One	41	1	1	0	1	0	—		3	0	46	1
Cheltenham Town	Total		60	7	1	0	1	0	—		4	0	66	7
St Patrick's Athletic	2024	LOI Premier Division	11	5	—		—		4 (Note: Appearances in the UEFA Conference League)	0	0	0	15	5
St Patrick's Athletic	2025	LOI Premier Division	21	6	1	1	—		4	1	4	2	30	10
St Patrick's Athletic	2026	LOI Premier Division	31	10	3	2	—		—		2	5	36	17
St Patrick's Athletic	Total		63	21	4	3	—		8	1	6	7	81	32
Career total			235	67	10	5	11	1	13	3	17	12	286	87

== Honours ==
=== Club ===
St Patrick's Athletic

- Leinster Senior Cup (1): 2023–24

=== Individual ===
- League of Ireland Player of the Month (4): March 2022, July 2022, February 2025, September 2026
- League of Ireland Premier Division top scorer (1): 2022
- PFAI Premier Division Team of the Year (1): 2022
- St Patrick's Athletic Goal of the Season (1): 2025 (vs. Galway United)
