= Mark McKenzie (footballer, born 2000) =

Scottish footballer

Personal information
- Date of birth: 17 August 2000 (age 26)
- Place of birth: Glasgow, Scotland
- Height: 6 ft 0 in (1.83 m)
- Position: Forward

Team information
- Current team: Ayr United
- Number: 22

Youth career
- –2019: Ayr United

Senior career*
Years	Team	Apps	(Gls)
2019–	Ayr United	183	(20)
2020	→ Forfar Athletic (loan)	3	(0)
- * Club domestic league appearances and goals as of 4 May 2026

Mark McKenzie (born 17 August 2000) is a Scottish footballer who plays as a forward for Scottish Championship club Ayr United.

== Career ==
McKenzie progressed through the youth academy at Ayr United, and made his debut for the club on 7 September 2019 against Wrexham in the Scottish Challenge Cup, before making his league debut later that month in a 4–1 Scottish Championship victory over Alloa Athletic.

He joined Forfar Athletic on loan on 25 February 2020.

McKenzie scored his first senior goals on 16 March 2021 with a brace in a 3–1 win over Dundee.

== Career statistics ==
As of match played 27 December 2025

Appearances and goals by club, season and competition
Club	Season	League			Scottish Cup		League Cup		Other		Total	
Club	Season	Division	Apps	Goals	Apps	Goals	Apps	Goals	Apps	Goals	Apps	Goals
Ayr United	2019–20	Scottish Championship	10	0	0	0	0	0	1 (Note: Appearance(s) in Scottish Challenge Cup)	0	11	0
Ayr United	2020–21	Scottish Championship	20	2	2	0	5	0	0	0	27	2
Ayr United	2021–22	Scottish Championship	28	2	1	0	4	0	1	0	34	2
Ayr United	2022–23	Scottish Championship	33	4	4	1	3	0	3 (Note: One appearance in Scottish Challenge Cup, two appearances in Scottish Premiership play-offs)	0	43	5
Ayr United	2023–24	Scottish Championship	31	2	3	1	5	2	1	0	40	5
Ayr United	2024–25	Scottish Championship	30	3	2	1	3	0	5 (Note: Three appearances in Scottish Challenge Cup, two appearances in Scottish Premiership play-offs)	0	40	4
Ayr United	2025–26	Scottish Championship	20	7	0	0	5	0	0	0	25	7
Ayr United	Total		172	20	12	3	25	2	11	0	220	25
Forfar Athletic (loan)	2019–20	Scottish League One	3	0	—		—		—		3	0
Career total			175	20	12	3	25	2	11	0	223	25
