= Max Thompson (footballer, born 2004) =

English footballer (born 2004)

Personal information
- Full name: Max Anthony Thompson
- Date of birth: 1 August 2004 (age 22)
- Place of birth: Newcastle upon Tyne, England
- Height: 6 ft 4 in (1.93 m)
- Position: Goalkeeper

Team information
- Current team: Gateshead

Youth career
- 2015–2023: Newcastle United

Senior career*
Years	Team	Apps	(Gls)
2023–2026	Newcastle United	0	(0)
2023–2024	→ Northampton Town (loan)	15	(0)
2024–2025	→ Chesterfield (loan)	18	(0)
2026	→ Ayr United (loan)	8	(0)
2026	Hartlepool United	3	(0)
2026–	Gateshead	0	(0)

International career^{‡}
2021–2022	England U18	2	(0)
- * Club domestic league appearances and goals as of 16:47, 11 October 2026 (UTC) ‡ National team caps and goals as of 28 March 2022

Max Anthony Thompson (born 1 August 2004) is an English professional footballer who plays as a goalkeeper for National League club Gateshead.

== Career ==
Thompson joined the Newcastle United academy at the age of 11. In August 2023, he signed on loan for Northampton Town. After 20 appearances, his loan deal ended in January 2024. In February 2024, Thompson signed a new contract with Newcastle United, running until the summer of 2025. On 29 August 2024, Thompson joined League Two club Chesterfield on a season-long loan deal.

In January 2026 he moved on loan to Ayr United. On 2 June 2026, Newcastle announced it would be releasing Thompson once his contract ended.

Thompson signed a short-term contract with Hartlepool United on 29 September 2026. Following the expiration of his contract with Hartlepool in November 2026, he subsequently joined fellow National League side Gateshead on a one-and-a-half year contract.

== Personal life ==
Thompson attended Ponteland High School growing up.

== Career statistics ==
As of match played on 17 October 2026

Appearances and goals by club, season and competition
Club	Season	League			FA Cup		EFL Cup		Other		Total	
Club	Season	Division	Apps	Goals	Apps	Goals	Apps	Goals	Apps	Goals	Apps	Goals
Newcastle United	2023–24	Premier League	0	0	0	0	0	0	0	0	0	0
Newcastle United	2024–25	Premier League	0	0	0	0	0	0	0	0	0	0
Newcastle United	2025–26	Premier League	0	0	0	0	0	0	0	0	0	0
Newcastle United	Career total		0	0	0	0	0	0	0	0	0	0
Northampton Town (loan)	2023–24	League One	15	0	1	0	1	0	3 (Note: Appearance(s) in the EFL Trophy.)	0	20	0
Chesterfield (loan)	2024–25	League Two	18	0	2	0	0	0	1	0	21	0
Ayr United (loan)	2025–26	Scottish Championship	8	0	0	0	0	0	2 (Note: Appearances in the Scottish League Challenge Cup)	0	10	0
Hartlepool United	2026–27	National League	3	0	1	0	0	0	0	0	4	0
Career total			44	0	4	0	1	0	6	0	55	0
