= 2020–21 Falkirk F.C. season =

Falkirk
2020–21 season
- Chairman: Gary Deans
- Manager: David McCracken & Lee Miller (Until 21 April); Gary Holt (Interim)
- Stadium: Falkirk Stadium
- League One: 5th
- Scottish Cup: Third round
- League Cup: Second round
- Top goalscorer: League: Callumn Morrison (7); All: Callumn Morrison (10)
Home colours	Away colours

The 2020–21 season was Falkirk's second season in League One following their relegation from the Championship at the end of the 2018–19 season. Falkirk also competed in the League Cup and the Scottish Cup. On 2 October 2020, the SPFL confirmed that the Scottish Challenge Cup had been cancelled for the upcoming season.

== Summary ==
Falkirk began their season on 6 October in the League Cup group stage with the League One season beginning on 17 October.

On 11 January 2021, all football below the Scottish Championship was postponed due to the COVID-19 pandemic. On 29 January 2021, the suspension was extended until at least 14 February.

In March 2021, the Scottish Government gave permission for the league to resume. On 16 March, clubs from League 1 and 2 voted to implement for a reduced 22-game season with a league split after 18 games.

On 21 April 2021, both of Falkirk's co-managers David McCracken & Lee Miller were sacked following their defeat to Peterhead with sporting director and former manager Gary Holt being appointed in interim charge until the end of the season.

== Results and fixtures ==
Win Draw Loss Postponed

=== Pre Season ===
19 September 2020	Raith Rovers	2–6	Falkirk	Kirkcaldy
15:00	Coulson 10'; Hendry 53' (pen.)	Report	Dowds 15', 57'; Morrison 28' (pen.); Connolly 66'; Keena 85'; Leitch 90'	Stadium: Stark's Park

22 September 2020	Heart of Midlothian	3–0	Falkirk	Edinburgh
	Boyce 44'; Walker 75'; Wighton 82' (pen.)	Report		Stadium: Oriam

26 September 2020	Falkirk	3–2	Ayr United	Falkirk
	Keena	Report	McCowan 10'; Hewitt 80'	Stadium: Falkirk Stadium

=== Scottish League One ===
17 October 2020 1	Montrose	1–3	Falkirk	Montrose
15:00	Quinn 50'; Steeves (red card) 85'	Report	Francis 43'; Morrison 85' (pen.); Leitch 90+2'	Stadium: Links Park; Attendance: 0 Referee: Craig Napier

24 October 2020 2	Falkirk	1–1	Forfar Athletic	Falkirk
15:00	Dowds 15'; Mutch (red card) 64'	Report	Allan 66' (pen.)	Stadium: Falkirk Stadium; Attendance: 0 Referee: Steve Kirkland

31 October 2020 3	Falkirk	2–0	East Fife	Falkirk
15:00	Leitch 39'; Francis 47'	Report		Stadium: Falkirk Stadium; Attendance: 0 Referee: Graham Beaton

7 November 2020 4	Partick Thistle	2–2	Falkirk	Glasgow
15:00	Cardle 66'; Graham 68'	Report	Morrison 13'; Telfer 88'	Stadium: Firhill Stadium; Attendance: 0 Referee: Grant Irvine

21 November 2020 5	Falkirk	1–0	Cove Rangers	Falkirk
15:00	Morrison 49'	Report		Stadium: Falkirk Stadium; Attendance: 0 Referee: David Dickinson

24 November 2020 6	Dumbarton	0–3	Falkirk	Dumbarton
19:00		Report	Morrison 16'; Alston 33'; Connolly 77'	Stadium: Dumbarton Football Stadium; Attendance: 0 Referee: Steven Kirkland

5 December 2020 7	Falkirk	2–1	Peterhead	Falkirk
15:00	Alston 25'; Sammon 45+1'	Report	Cameron 77'	Stadium: Falkirk Stadium; Attendance: 0 Referee: Peter Stuart

12 December 2020 8	Clyde	0–3	Falkirk	Cumbernauld
15:00		Report	Telfer 30'; Mercer 55'; Hall 59'	Stadium: Broadwood Stadium; Attendance: 0

20 December 2020 9	Falkirk	0–1	Airdrieonians	Falkirk
15:00		Report	Connell 82'	Stadium: Falkirk Stadium; Attendance: 0

26 December 2020 10	Falkirk	0–0	Partick Thistle	Falkirk
12:00		Report	Rudden (red card) 64'	Stadium: Falkirk Stadium; Attendance: 0 Referee: Duncan Williams

2 January 2021 11	East Fife	2–1	Falkirk	Methil
15:00	Smith 20'; Hamilton 69'	Report	Morrison 47'	Stadium: Bayview Stadium; Attendance: 0 Referee: Graham Beaton

20 March 2021 12	Falkirk	2–0	Montrose	Falkirk
15:00	Durnan 12'; Morrison 90'	Report		Stadium: Falkirk Stadium; Attendance: 0 Referee: Gavin Duncan

27 March 2021 13	Forfar Athletic	0–2	Falkirk	Forfar
15:00		Report	Telfer 25'; Alston 48'	Stadium: Station Park; Attendance: 0 Referee: Steven Reid

30 March 2021 14	Falkirk	1–1	Dumbarton	Falkirk
19:45	Dowds 74'; Durnan (red card) 81'	Report	Omar 68'	Stadium: Falkirk Stadium; Attendance: 0 Referee: Steven Kirkland

6 April 2021 15	Airdrieonians	2–1	Falkirk	Airdrie
19:00	Roy 9'; Carrick 81' (pen.)	Report	Telfer 35'	Stadium: Excelsior Stadium; Attendance: 0 Referee: Colin Steven

10 April 2021 16	Falkirk	2–1	Clyde	Falkirk
15:00	Hall 9'; Keena 68'	Report	Jack 84'	Stadium: Falkirk Stadium; Attendance: 0 Referee: Craig Napier

17 April 2021 17	Cove Rangers	2–0	Falkirk	Cove Bay
12:00	Megginson 12', 48'	Report		Stadium: Balmoral Stadium; Attendance: 0 Referee: David Dickinson

20 April 2021 18	Peterhead	1–0	Falkirk	Peterhead
19:45	Brown 81'	Report	Gomis (red card) 75'	Stadium: Balmoor Stadium; Attendance: 0 Referee: Duncan Williams

24 April 2021 19	Falkirk	2–2	Cove Rangers	Falkirk
15:00	Morrison 19' (pen.); Sammon 86'	Report	McIntosh 36'; Megginson 76'	Stadium: Falkirk Stadium; Attendance: 0 Referee: Gavin Duncan

29 April 2021 20	Partick Thistle	5–0	Falkirk	Glasgow
19:00	Rudden 30'; Graham 32', 41', 59'; Cardle 72'	Report		Stadium: Firhill Stadium; Attendance: 0 Referee: David Dickinson

1 May 2021 21	Falkirk	1–2	Montrose	Falkirk
15:00	Sammon 5'	Report	Ballantyne 45'; Milne 62'	Stadium: Falkirk Stadium; Attendance: 0 Referee: Steven Kirkland

4 May 2021 22	Airdrieonians	2–0	Falkirk	Airdrie
19:00	Thomson 88'; Turner 90+4'	Report		Stadium: Excelsior Stadium; Attendance: 0 Referee: Scott Lambie

=== Scottish League Cup ===
==== Group stage ====
Results

6 October 2020 1	Falkirk	3–0	Kilmarnock	Falkirk
19:45				Stadium: Falkirk Stadium

9 October 2020 2	Dunfermline Athletic	2–0	Falkirk	Dunfermline
19:45	Murray 58', 65'	Report		Stadium: East End Park; Attendance: 0 Referee: Grant Irvine

13 October 2020 3	Falkirk	2–1	Clyde	Falkirk
19:45	Keena 13'; Morrison 47' (pen.)	Report	Goodwillie 17'	Stadium: Falkirk Stadium; Attendance: 0 Referee: Lloyd Wilson

10 November 2020 4	Dumbarton	0–4	Falkirk	Dumbarton
19:45		Report	Morrison 12', 49'; Sammon 73'; Dowds 82'	Stadium: Dumbarton Football Stadium; Attendance: 0 Referee: Scott Lambie

Pos	Team	Pld	W	PW	PL	L	GF	GA	GD	Pts	Qualification	DNF	FAL	KIL	CLY	DUM
1	Dunfermline Athletic	4	4	0	0	0	9	2	+7	12	Qualification for the Second round	—	2–0	—	3–2	—
2	Falkirk	4	3	0	0	1	9	3	+6	9	Qualification for the Second round	—	—	3–0	2–1	—
3	Kilmarnock	4	2	0	0	2	4	6	−2	6		0–3	—	—	—	2–0
4	Clyde	4	1	0	0	3	6	9	−3	3		—	—	0–2	—	3–2
5	Dumbarton	4	0	0	0	4	2	10	−8	0		0–1	0–4	—	—	—

Rules for classification: 1) points, 2) goal difference, 3) goals scored, 4) away goals scored, 5) matches won, 6) away matches won, 7) drawing of lots.

==== Knockout stage ====
29 November 2020 Second round	Falkirk	0–4	Rangers	Falkirk
17:00		Report	Defoe 6'; Bassey 30'; Barišić 41'; Tavernier 51'	Stadium: Falkirk Stadium; Attendance: 0 Referee: Bobby Madden

=== Scottish Cup ===
23 March 2021 Second round	Arbroath	1–2	Falkirk	Arbroath
15:00	O'Brien 8'	Report	Telfer 42'; Fotheringham 87'	Stadium: Gayfield Park; Attendance: 0 Referee: David Munro

3 April 2021 Third round	Celtic	3–0	Falkirk	Glasgow
15:00	Forrest 56'; Christie 58'; Elyounoussi 79'	Report		Stadium: Celtic Park; Attendance: 0 Referee: John Beaton

== Player statistics ==
As of 4 May 2021 (UTC)

No.	Pos	Nat	Player	Total		League One		League Cup		Scottish Cup	
No.	Pos	Nat	Player	Apps	Goals	Apps	Goals	Apps	Goals	Apps	Goals
1	GK	(Scotland) SCO	Robbie Mutch	21	0	17+0	0	2+0	0	2+0	0
2	DF	(Scotland) SCO	Scott Mercer	19	1	15+1	1	2+0	0	1+0	0
3	DF	(Scotland) SCO	Paul Dixon	21	0	16+0	0	4+0	0	0+1	0
4	DF	(Northern Ireland) NIR	Ben Hall	21	2	16+0	2	4+0	0	1+0	0
5	DF	(Scotland) SCO	Mark Durnan	15	1	11+1	1	3+0	0	0+0	0
6	DF	(Scotland) SCO	Gary Miller	19	0	14+3	0	1+0	0	1+0	0
8	MF	(Scotland) SCO	Blair Alston	24	3	20+1	3	2+0	0	1+0	0
9	FW	(Republic of Ireland) IRL	Aidan Keena	14	2	7+4	1	2+0	1	1+0	0
10	FW	(Scotland) SCO	Anton Dowds	23	3	10+7	2	2+2	1	2+0	0
11	MF	(Scotland) SCO	Aidan Connolly	6	1	2+3	1	0+1	0	0+0	0
14	MF	(Senegal) SEN	Morgaro Gomis	23	0	16+2	0	3+1	0	1+0	0
15	DF	(Scotland) SCO	Lewis Neilson	10	0	7+1	0	0+0	0	2+0	0
16	FW	(England) ENG	Akeel Francis	22	2	4+13	2	1+2	0	2+0	0
17	FW	(Scotland) SCO	Robbie Leitch	27	2	10+11	2	3+1	0	2+0	0
18	FW	(Republic of Ireland) IRL	Conor Sammon	25	4	14+5	3	2+2	1	2+0	0
19	DF	(Northern Ireland) NIR	Euan Deveney	7	0	1+3	0	0+1	0	2+0	0
20	FW	(Scotland) SCO	Aidan Laverty	1	0	0+0	0	0+1	0	0+0	0
21	MF	(Scotland) SCO	Charlie Telfer	17	5	7+6	4	1+1	0	2+0	1
22	DF	(Scotland) SCO	Blair Sneddon	0	0	0+0	0	0+0	0	0+0	0
24	FW	(Scotland) SCO	Kai Fotheringham	13	1	10+1	0	0+0	0	1+1	1
25	GK	(Scotland) SCO	Jay Cantley	0	0	0+0	0	0+0	0	0+0	0
33	DF	(Scotland) SCO	Sean Kelly	16	0	11+3	0	2+0	0	0+0	0
38	MF	(Scotland) SCO	Callumn Morrison	25	10	19+2	7	4+0	3	0+0	0
72	DF	(Northern Ireland) NIR	Kyle McClelland	8	0	5+1	0	0+0	0	2+0	0
Players who left the club during the 2020–21 season
7	MF	(England) ENG	Josh Todd	12	0	3+5	0	3+1	0	0+0	0
23	GK	(Scotland) SCO	Peter Morrison	7	0	5+0	0	2+0	0	0+0	0
30	GK	(Scotland) SCO	Matthew Connolly	0	0	0+0	0	0+0	0	0+0	0
99	FW	(Scotland) SCO	Lee Miller	7	0	0+7	0	0+0	0	0+0	0

== Team statistics ==
=== League table ===
Pos	Team	Pld	W	D	L	GF	GA	GD	Pts	Promotion, qualification or relegation
3	Cove Rangers	22	10	6	6	28	18	+10	36	Qualification for the Championship play-offs
4	Montrose	22	9	6	7	33	33	0	33	Qualification for the Championship play-offs
5	Falkirk	22	9	5	8	29	26	+3	32	
6	East Fife	22	10	3	9	30	33	−3	33	
7	Peterhead	22	9	2	11	24	27	−3	29	

Source: SPFL
Rules for classification: 1) Points; 2) Goal difference; 3) Goals scored; 4) Head-to-to head points; 5) Head-to-head goal difference; 6) Play-off (only for deciding promotion, play-off participation and relegation).

=== Division summary ===
Round	1	2	3	4	5	6	7	8	9	10	11	12	13	14	15	16	17	18	19	20	21	22
Ground	A	H	H	A	H	A	H	A	H	H	A	H	A	H	A	A	A	A	H	A	H	A
Result	W	D	W	D	W	W	W	W	L	D	L	W	W	D	L	W	L	L	D	L	L	L
Position	2	2	2	2	2	1	1	1	1	1	1	1	1	1	1	1	1	2	2	4	4	5

Updated to match(es) played on 4 May 2020. Source:
A = Away; H = Home; W = Win; D = Draw; L = Loss

== Transfers ==
=== Players in ===
Player	From	Fee
(Scotland) Blair Sneddon	(Scotland) Camelon Juniors	Free
(Scotland) Anton Dowds	(Scotland) East Fife	Free
(Republic of Ireland) Aidan Keena	(England) Hartlepool United	Undisclosed
(Scotland) Callumn Morrison	(Scotland) Heart of Midlothian	Free
(Scotland) Blair Alston	(Scotland) Hamilton Academical	Free
(England) Akeel Francis	(England) Grantham Town	Free
(Scotland) Matthew Connolly	(Scotland) Motherwell	Loan
(Scotland) Peter Morrison	(Scotland) Motherwell	Loan
(Northern Ireland) Euan Deveney	(Scotland) Kilmarnock	Loan
(Scotland) Sean Kelly	Free Agent	Free
(Northern Ireland) Kyle McClelland	(Scotland) Rangers	Loan
(Scotland) Kai Fotheringham	(Scotland) Dundee United	Loan
(Scotland) Lewis Neilson	(Scotland) Dundee United	Loan

=== Players out ===
Player	To	Fee
(Scotland) Ian McShane	(Scotland) Darvel	Free
(Scotland) Denny Johnstone	(Scotland) Dumbarton	Free
(Scotland) Michael Doyle	(Scotland) Queen's Park	Free
(Scotland) Gregor Buchanan	(Scotland) Queen of the South	Free
(Scotland) Louis Longridge	(Scotland) Queen's Park	Free
(England) Josh Todd	(Scotland) Ayr United	Loan

== See also ==
- List of Falkirk F.C. seasons

Notes

1. A: Falkirk were awarded a technical 3–0 win over Kilmarnock who were unable to raise a team after six players tested positive for COVID-19.
