= Marco Rus =

Romanian professional footballer

Personal information
- Full name: Marco Alin Rus
- Date of birth: 23 January 2003 (age 23)
- Place of birth: Cluj-Napoca, Romania
- Height: 1.79 m (5 ft 10 in)
- Position: Midfielder

Team information
- Current team: Ayr United
- Number: 23

Youth career
- 2015–2019: Yeovil Town
- 2019–2021: Southampton
- 2021–2022: Coventry City

Senior career*
Years	Team	Apps	(Gls)
2022–2024	Coventry City	0	(0)
2022	→ Hereford (loan)	4	(1)
2023	→ Chorley (loan)	6	(1)
2023–2024	→ Chorley (loan)	6	(2)
2024	→ Universitatea Cluj (loan)	7	(0)
2024–	Ayr United	64	(5)

International career
2019	Romania U16	3	(0)
2019–2020	Romania U17	5	(0)
- * Club domestic league appearances and goals as of 7 November 2026

Marco Alin Rus (born 23 January 2003) is a Romanian professional footballer who plays as a midfielder for Scottish Championship club Ayr United.

Born in Cluj-Napoca, he moved to England at the age of 9. He played for the youth academies of English clubs Yeovil Town, Southampton and Coventry City before signing a senior contract at Coventry and spending time on loan at Hereford, Chorley and Universitatea Cluj. He joined Ayr United on a permanent basis in June 2024.

== Early life ==
Rus was born in Cluj-Napoca, but when he was 9 he moved to England with his family. He played for the youth academies of English clubs Yeovil Town, Southampton and Coventry City.

== Club career ==
=== Coventry City ===
In the summer of 2021, Rus joined the academy of EFL Championship club Coventry City after being released by Southampton at the end of the previous season. After a trial period, he signed a two-year contract until June 2023.

In June 2023, Rus signed a new two-year contract at Coventry until 2025.

==== Loan to Hereford ====
On 3 December 2022, Rus joined National League North club Hereford on a one-month loan. He made his debut the same day in a 2–1 league defeat away against King’s Lynn Town. He scored his first and only goal for Hereford three days later on his home debut in a 1–1 league draw against Chorley.

==== Loans to Chorley ====
On 23 March 2023, Rus joined National League North club Chorley on loan until the end of the season.

On 9 December 2023, Rus returned to Chorley on a one-month youth loan.

==== Loan to Universitatea Cluj ====
On 13 February 2024, Rus joined Liga I club Universitatea Cluj on loan until the end of the season. He made his league debut against FCSB on 19 February 2024.

=== Ayr United ===
On 15 June 2024, Rus signed for Scottish Championship club Ayr United for an undisclosed fee.

== Personal life ==
His father, Alin, was also a professional footballer.

== Career statistics ==
As of match played 7 November 2026

Appearances and goals by club, season and competition
Club	Season	League			National cup (Note: Includes FA Cup, Cupa României, Scottish Cup)		League cup (Note: Includes EFL Cup, Scottish League Cup)		Other		Total	
Club	Season	Division	Apps	Goals	Apps	Goals	Apps	Goals	Apps	Goals	Apps	Goals
Coventry City	2021–22	Championship	0	0	0	0	0	0	—		0	0
Coventry City	2022–23	Championship	0	0	0	0	0	0	0	0	0	0
Coventry City	2023–24	Championship	0	0	0	0	0	0	—		0	0
Coventry City	Total		0	0	0	0	0	0	0	0	0	0
Hereford (loan)	2022–23	National League North	4	1	0	0	—		0	0	4	1
Chorley (loan)	2022–23	National League North	6	1	0	0	—		0	0	6	1
Chorley (loan)	2023–24	National League North	6	2	0	0	—		0	0	6	2
Universitatea Cluj (loan)	2023–24	Liga I	7	0	1	0	—		—		8	0
Ayr United	2024–25	Scottish Championship	29	3	2	0	3	1	5 (Note: Three appearances in Scottish Challenge Cup; two appearances in Scottish Premiership play-offs)	1	39	5
Ayr United	2025–26	Scottish Championship	29	1	1	0	5	0	1 (Note: Appearance in Scottish Challenge Cup)	0	36	1
Ayr United	2026–27	Scottish Championship	6	1	0	0	0	0	0	0	6	1
Ayr United	Total		64	5	3	0	8	1	6	1	81	7
Career total			87	9	4	0	8	1	6	1	105	11

== Honours ==
Individual

- Ayr United Goal of the Season: 2024–25
- Ayr United Young Player of the Year: 2024–25
