= 2021–22 Falkirk F.C. season =

Falkirk
2021–22 season
- Chairman: Gary Deans
- Manager: Paul Sheerin (until 5 December); Martin Rennie (Until 14 April); Kenny Miller (Interim)
- Stadium: Falkirk Stadium
- League One: 6th
- Scottish Cup: Third round
- League Cup: Group stage
- Challenge Cup: Second round
- Top goalscorer: League: Anton Dowds (8); All: Callumn Morrison (10)
- Highest home attendance: 4,043 vs. Queen's Park, League One, 28 August 2021
- Lowest home attendance: 400 vs. Clyde, League One, 26 December 2021 (Behind Closed Doors)
- Average home league attendance: 3,500
Home colours	Away colours

The 2021–22 season was Falkirk's third season in League One following their relegation from the Championship at the end of the 2018–19 season. Falkirk also competed in the League Cup, Challenge Cup and the Scottish Cup.

== Summary ==
On 28 May 2021, former Aberdeen assistant coach Paul Sheerin was appointed as the club's new head coach ahead of the new season. On 5 December 2021, Paul Sheerin was relieved of his duties as head coach. On 10 December, Martin Rennie was appointed as the new head coach of Falkirk. Former Scotland striker Kenny Miller, who joined the club as an assistant coach, would take over on an interim basis for the final three matches of the season following Rennie's departure.

== Results and fixtures ==
Win Draw Loss Postponed

=== Pre Season ===
26 June 2021	Falkirk	5–0	Irvine Meadow XI	Falkirk Stadium
15:00	Trialist 14', 29', 36'; Morrison; Dowds	Report

3 July 2021	Heart of Midlothian	4–0	Falkirk	National Sports Training Centre, Largs
15:00	Henderson 2'; Gnanduillet 31', 69'; Kingsley 89'	Report

=== Scottish League One ===
31 July 2021 1	Cove Rangers	1–1	Falkirk	Balmoral Stadium
15:00	MacAllister 78'	Report	Nesbitt 65'	Attendance: 672; Referee: Alan Newlands

7 August 2021 2	Falkirk	2–1	Peterhead	Falkirk Stadium
15:00	McGuffie 14'; Dixon 54'	Report	Brown 90+4'	Attendance: 2,806; Referee: Matthew MacDermid

14 August 2021 3	Airdrieonians	1–2	Falkirk	Excelsior Stadium
15:00	McGill 50'	Report	Morrison 28'; Keena 30'; Hetherington (red card) 45'	Referee: Greg Aitken

21 August 2021 4	Falkirk	3–0	Clyde	Falkirk Stadium
15:00	Dixon 57'; Morrison 67' (pen.), 90+3'	Report		Attendance: 3,545; Referee: Colin Steven

28 August 2021 5	Falkirk	0–1	Queen's Park	Falkirk Stadium
15:00		Report	Murray 36'	Attendance: 4,043; Referee: Colin Steven

11 September 2021 6	Alloa Athletic	2–0	Falkirk	Recreation Park
15:00	Henderson 30'; Sammon 64'	Report		Referee: David Dickinson

18 September 2021 7	Falkirk	1–2	Dumbarton	Falkirk Stadium
15:00	Telfer 90+8'	Report	Orsi 60'; Wilson 68'	Attendance: 3,518; Referee: Dan McFarlane

25 September 2021 8	Montrose	2–2	Falkirk	Links Park
15:00	Webster 60', 76'	Report	Keena 79'; Ruth 90+1'	Attendance: 918; Referee: Dan McFarlane

2 October 2021 9	Falkirk	2–1	East Fife	Falkirk Stadium
15:00	Ruth 60'; Keena 74'	Report	Millar 21'	Attendance: 3,250; Referee: Alan Newlands

16 October 2021 10	Falkirk	0–3	Airdrieonians	Falkirk Stadium
15:00		Report	Easton 35'; Smith 67'; Kerr 81'	Attendance: 3,525; Referee: Steven Reid

23 October 2021 11	Peterhead	0–0	Falkirk	Balmoor Stadium
15:00		Report		Attendance: 743; Referee: Peter Stuart

30 October 2021 12	Clyde	1–3	Falkirk	Broadwood Stadium
15:00	Goodwillie 74' (pen.)	Report	Ruth 45+1'; McGuffie 67'; Hetherington (red card) 73'; Telfer 90+4'	Attendance: 1,163; Referee: Euan Anderson

6 November 2021 13	Falkirk	1–1	Alloa Athletic	Falkirk Stadium
15:00	Morrison 88' (pen.)	Report	Henderson 90'	Attendance: 3,514; Referee: Matthew MacDermid

13 November 2021 14	Dumbarton	0–3	Falkirk	Dumbarton Football Stadium
15:00		Report	Ruth 11'; Nesbitt 54'; Telfer 71'	Attendance: 886; Referee: Chris Graham

20 November 2021 15	Falkirk	0–1	Montrose	Falkirk Stadium
15:00		Report	Ballantyne 37'	Referee: Greg Aitken

4 December 2021 16	Queen's Park	6–0	Falkirk	Firhill Stadium
15:00	Longridge 4'; Brown 35', 65'; Connell 68'; Fox 77'; Longstaff 84'	Report		Attendance: 1,119; Referee: Euan Anderson

11 December 2021 17	Falkirk	0–3	Cove Rangers	Falkirk Stadium
15:00		Report	Neill 20'; McAllister 39'; McIntosh 90+1'; Logan (red card) 90+4'	Attendance: 3,258; Referee: Calum Scott

26 December 2021 19	Falkirk	1–2	Clyde	Falkirk Stadium
15:00	Keena 50' (pen.)	Report	Love 61' (pen.); Splaine 75'	Attendance: 400; Referee: Alan Newlands

8 January 2022 21	Falkirk	6–2	Dumbarton	Falkirk Stadium
15:00	Dowds 8', 45', 88'; Morrison 13'; Taylor-Sinclair 54'; Keena 72'	Report	Paton 56'; Carswell 66' (pen.)	Attendance: 500; Referee: Calum Scott

15 January 2022 22	Airdrieonians	3–2	Falkirk	Excelsior Stadium
15:00	Fordyce 35'; McGill 43'; Gallagher 86'	Report	McKay 47'; Dowds 89'	Attendance: 500; Referee: Duncan Williams

22 January 2022 18	East Fife	0–2	Falkirk	Bayview Stadium
15:00		Report	Kabia 52', 90+1'	Attendance: 1,020; Referee: Barry Cook

29 January 2022 23	Montrose	2–1	Falkirk	Links Park
15:00	Lyons 40'; Johnston 45+1'	Report	Fleming 34' (o.g.)	Attendance: 1,036; Referee: Mike Roncone

5 February 2022 24	Falkirk	1–1	Queen's Park	Falkirk Stadium
15:00	Dowds 49'; Nesbitt (red card) 90+5'	Report	Smith 15'	Attendance: 3,427; Referee: Stewart Luke

8 February 2022 20	Alloa Athletic	0–3	Falkirk	Recreation Park
15:00		Report	Kabia 50'; McGuffie 58'; Dowds 78'	Attendance: 1,504; Referee: Duncan Williams

19 February 2022 25	Cove Rangers	2–0	Falkirk	Balmoral Stadium
15:00	Megginson 25'; Fyvie 64'	Report	McKay (red card) 77'	Attendance: 1,101; Referee: Colin Steven

22 February 2022 26	Falkirk	1–1	Peterhead	Falkirk Stadium
19:45	Duncan 9'	Report	Dowds 41'	Attendance: 3,187; Referee: Peter Stuart

26 February 2022 27	Falkirk	3–1	East Fife	Falkirk Stadium
15:00	McGuffie 16'; Watson 89'; Griffiths 90+4' (pen.)	Report	Wallace 25'	Referee: Duncan Williams

5 March 2022 28	Clyde	1–1	Falkirk	Broadwood Stadium
15:00	Jamieson 90'	Report	Watson 27'	Attendance: 1,331; Referee: Alan Muir

12 March 2022 29	Falkirk	1–4	Airdrieonians	Falkirk Stadium
15:00	Griffiths 76'	Report	Smith 6', 62'; Gallagher 74'; McGill 83'	Attendance: 3,646; Referee: Lloyd Wilson

19 March 2022 30	Dumbarton	0–2	Falkirk	Dumbarton Football Stadium
15:00		Report	Kabia 4'; Telfer 27'	Referee: Steven Kirkland

26 March 2022 31	Peterhead	1–0	Falkirk	Balmoor Stadium
15:00	Brown 36'	Report	Wilson (red card) 90+3'	Attendance: 705; Referee: Alan Newlands

2 April 2022 32	Falkirk	0–3	Montrose	Falkirk Stadium
15:00		Report	Cameron 13'; Gardyne 71' (pen.); Campbell 89'	Attendance: 3,158; Referee: Stewart Luke

9 April 2022 33	Falkirk	0–2	Cove Rangers	Falkirk Stadium
15:00		Report	Milne 54', 60'	Attendance: 3,113; Referee: Chris Graham

16 April 2022 34	East Fife	1–3	Falkirk	Bayview Stadium
15:00	Semple 84' (pen.)	Report	Morrison 34', 90+1'; Telfer 56'	Referee: Steven Reid

23 April 2022 35	Falkirk	1–2	Alloa Athletic	Falkirk Stadium
15:00	Dowds 77'	Report	Cawley 8'; Sammon 56'	Referee: David Dickinson

30 April 2022 36	Queen's Park	1–1	Falkirk	Firhill Stadium
15:00	Quitongo 30'	Report	Morrison 84'	Attendance: 922; Referee: Chris Fordyce

=== Scottish League Cup ===
==== Group stage ====
Results

13 July 2021 Group stage	Falkirk	5–1	Albion Rovers	Falkirk
19:45	Morrison 23', 29'; Dixon 36'; Telfer 85'; Weekes 87'	Report	Wright 11'	Stadium: Falkirk Stadium; Attendance: 1,000; Referee: Steven Kirkland

17 July 2021 Group stage	Falkirk	1–2	Hamilton Academical	Falkirk
15:00	Nesbitt 46'; Miller (red card) 78'	Report	Hughes 79' (pen.); Hamilton 87'	Stadium: Falkirk Stadium; Attendance: 723; Referee: Steven McLean

21 July 2021 Group stage	Edinburgh City	3 – 0	Falkirk	Edinburgh
19:45				Stadium: Ainslie Park

24 July 2021 Group stage	Ayr United	3 – 0	Falkirk	Ayr
15:00				Stadium: Somerset Park

Pos	Team	Pld	W	PW	PL	L	GF	GA	GD	Pts	Qualification	AYR	HAM	ALB	EDI	FAL
1	Ayr United	4	3	0	1	0	7	0	+7	10	Qualification for the second round	—	—	—	3–0	3–0 (Note: Ayr United were awarded a technical 3−0 win over Falkirk, who were unable to raise a team after a COVID-19 outbreak among players and staff.)
2	Hamilton Academical	4	2	1	0	1	5	4	+1	8		0–1	—	p2–2	—	—
3	Albion Rovers	4	0	2	1	1	4	8	−4	5		p0–0	—	—	p1–1	—
4	Edinburgh City	4	1	0	1	2	4	5	−1	4		—	0–1	—	—	3–0 (Note: Edinburgh City were awarded a technical 3−0 win over Falkirk, who were unable to raise a team after a COVID-19 outbreak among players and staff.)
5	Falkirk	4	1	0	0	3	6	9	−3	3		—	1–2	5–1	—	—

Rules for classification: 1) goal difference, 2) goals scored, 3) away goals scored, 4) matches won, 5) away matches won, 6) drawing of lots.
Notes:

Notes

1. A: Edinburgh City were awarded a technical 3–0 win over Falkirk, who were unable to raise a team after a COVID-19 outbreak among players and staff.
2. B: Ayr United were awarded a technical 3–0 win over Falkirk, who were unable to raise a team after a COVID-19 outbreak among players and staff.

=== Scottish Challenge Cup ===
11 August 2021 First round	Falkirk	3–0	East Kilbride	Falkirk Stadium
19:30	Old 31' (o.g.); Ross 57'; Keena 72'	Report

4 September 2021 Second round	Kilmarnock	3–1	Falkirk	Rugby Park
15:00	Murray 4', 78'; Naismith 55'	Report	Nesbitt 8'	Attendance: 2,457; Referee: Alan Newlands

=== Scottish Cup ===
27 November 2021 Third round	Falkirk	1–2	Raith Rovers	Falkirk Stadium
15:00	Morrison 50'	Report	Tumilty (red card) 20'; Matthews 27'; Ross 84'	Attendance: 2,512; Referee: Nick Walsh

== Player statistics ==
As of 30 April 2022 (UTC)

No.	Pos	Nat	Player	Total		League One		League Cup		Challenge Cup		Scottish Cup	
No.	Pos	Nat	Player	Apps	Goals	Apps	Goals	Apps	Goals	Apps	Goals	Apps	Goals
1	GK	(Scotland) SCO	Robbie Mutch	25	0	23+0	0	2+0	0	0+0	0	0+0	0
2	DF	(Scotland) SCO	Ryan Williamson	22	0	19+0	0	2+0	0	0+0	0	1+0	0
3	DF	(Scotland) SCO	Paul Dixon	24	3	20+1	2	2+0	1	0+0	0	1+0	0
5	DF	(Antigua and Barbuda) ANT	Aaron Taylor-Sinclair	15	1	14+1	1	0+0	0	0+0	0	0+0	0
6	MF	(Scotland) SCO	Gary Miller	37	0	31+3	0	1+0	0	0+1	0	0+1	0
7	MF	(Scotland) SCO	Callumn Morrison	23	10	15+4	7	2+0	2	0+1	0	1+0	1
8	MF	(England) ENG	Steven Hetherington	30	0	22+5	0	1+0	0	0+1	0	1+0	0
9	FW	(Scotland) SCO	Leigh Griffiths	13	2	11+2	2	0	0	0	0	0	0
10	MF	(Scotland) SCO	Aidan Nesbitt	39	4	23+11	2	1+1	1	2+0	1	1+0	0
11	MF	(Scotland) SCO	Craig McGuffie	38	4	29+5	4	2+0	0	1+0	0	1+0	0
12	GK	(Scotland) SCO	Paddy Martin	16	0	13+0	0	0+0	0	2+0	0	1+0	0
13	GK	(Scotland) SCO	Luke Holt	0	0	0+0	0	0+0	0	0+0	0	0+0	0
14	FW	(Scotland) SCO	Jaimie Wilson	12	0	2+6	0	1+1	0	2+0	0	0+0	0
15	DF	(Scotland) SCO	Liam McCann	30	0	20+6	0	2+0	0	2+0	0	0+0	0
16	MF	(Scotland) SCO	Seb Ross	23	1	6+13	0	1+1	0	2+0	1	0+0	0
17	MF	(South Africa) RSA	Keaghan Jacobs	12	0	9+3	0	0+0	0	0+0	0	0+0	0
18	FW	(England) ENG	Samuel Ompreon	11	0	1+8	0	0+0	0	2+0	0	0+0	0
19	FW	(Scotland) SCO	Anton Dowds	15	8	11+2	8	1+1	0	0+0	0	0+0	0
20	DF	(Scotland) SCO	Blair Sneddon	0	0	0+0	0	0+0	0	0+0	0	0+0	0
21	MF	(Scotland) SCO	Charlie Telfer	38	6	34+0	5	2+0	1	0+1	0	1+0	0
22	DF	(Scotland) SCO	Brad McKay	16	1	14+0	1	1+0	0	1+0	0	0+0	0
25	DF	(Scotland) SCO	Mackenzie Lemon	8	0	5+1	0	0+0	0	2+0	0	0+0	0
27	FW	(Republic of Ireland) IRL	Jaze Kabia	12	4	8+4	4	0	0	0	0	0	0
28	MF	(Scotland) SCO	Johnny Armstrong	0	0	0	0	0	0	0	0	0	0
29	FW	(Scotland) SCO	Finlay Malcolm	1	0	0+1	0	0	0	0	0	0	0
30	DF	(Republic of Ireland) IRL	Jevon Mills	6	0	6+0	0	0+0	0	0+0	0	0+0	0
44	DF	(Scotland) SCO	Paul Watson	9	2	9+0	2	0+0	0	0+0	0	0+0	0
Players who left the club during the 2021–22 season
4	DF	(Northern Ireland) NIR	Ben Hall	21	0	17+1	0	0+1	0	1+0	0	1+0	0
5	MF	(Albania) ALB	Ernaldo Krasniqi	6	0	0+3	0	0+0	0	2+0	0	0+1	0
9	FW	(Scotland) SCO	Michael Ruth	13	4	11+1	4	0+0	0	0+0	0	1+0	0
17	FW	(Republic of Ireland) IRL	Aidan Keena	20	6	8+9	5	0+1	0	0+1	1	0+1	0
23	FW	(Scotland) SCO	Ben Weekes	4	1	0+2	0	0+1	1	1+0	0	0+0	0
24	DF	(Scotland) SCO	Cammy Williamson	9	0	2+4	0	0+1	0	2+0	0	0+0	0
26	MF	(Scotland) SCO	Declan McDaid	9	0	8+1	0	0+0	0	0+0	0	0+0	0
31	GK	(Scotland) SCO	Scott Cowie	0	0	0+0	0	0+0	0	0+0	0	0+0	0

== Team statistics ==
=== League table ===
Pos	Team	Pld	W	D	L	GF	GA	GD	Pts	Promotion, qualification or relegation
4	Queen's Park (O, P)	36	11	18	7	51	36	+15	51	Qualification for the Championship play-offs
5	Alloa Athletic	36	12	9	15	49	57	−8	45	
6	Falkirk	36	12	8	16	49	55	−6	44	
7	Peterhead	36	11	9	16	46	51	−5	42	
8	Clyde	36	9	12	15	39	62	−23	39	

Rules for classification: 1) Points; 2) Goal difference; 3) Goals scored; 4) Head-to-to head points; 5) Head-to-head goal difference; 6) Play-off (only for deciding promotion, play-off participation and relegation).
(O) Play-off winners; (P) Promoted

== Transfers ==
=== Players in ===
Player	From	Fee
(Scotland) Ryan Williamson	(Scotland) Partick Thistle	Free
(England) Steven Hetherington	(Scotland) Alloa Athletic	Free
(Scotland) Brad McKay	(Scotland) Inverness CT	Free
(Scotland) Aidan Nesbitt	(Scotland) Greenock Morton	Free
(Scotland) Craig McGuffie	(Scotland) Greenock Morton	Free
(Scotland) Leon McCann	(Scotland) Hamilton Academical	Free
(Scotland) Seb Ross	(Scotland) Cove Rangers	Free
(Scotland) Jaimie Wilson	(Scotland) Dumbarton	Free
(Scotland) Paddy Martin	(Scotland) Hibernian	Free
(Scotland) MacKenzie Lemon	(Scotland) Dundee United	Free
(England) Samuel Ompreon	(England) Sheffield United	Free
(Antigua and Barbuda) Aaron Taylor-Sinclair	Unattached	Free
(Scotland) Paul Watson	(Scotland) Dunfermline Athletic	Free
(Scotland) Leigh Griffiths	(Scotland) Celtic	Free

=== Players out ===
Player	To	Fee
(Scotland) Jay Cantley	(Scotland) Airdrieonians	Free
(England) Akeel Francis	Free Agent	Free
(Senegal) Morgaro Gomis	(Scotland) Clyde	Free
(Scotland) Aidan Laverty	Free Agent	Free
(Scotland) Robbie Leitch	(Scotland) Cove Rangers	Free
(Scotland) Scott Mercer	(Scotland) East Fife	Free
(Republic of Ireland) Conor Sammon	(Scotland) Alloa Athletic	Free
(England) Josh Todd	(Scotland) Queen of the South	Free
(Scotland) Mark Durnan	(Scotland) Alloa Athletic	Free
(Scotland) Blair Alston	(Scotland) Kilmarnock	Free
(Scotland) Aidan Connolly	(Scotland) Raith Rovers	Free
(Scotland) Sean Kelly	(Scotland) Livingston	Free
(Republic of Ireland) Aidan Keena	(Republic of Ireland) Sligo Rovers	Free
(Northern Ireland) Ben Hall	(Northern Ireland) Linfield	Free

=== Loans in ===
Player	From	Fee
(Albania) Ernaldo Krasniqi	(England) Huddersfield Town	Loan
(Scotland) Michael Ruth	(Scotland) Aberdeen	Loan
(Scotland) Declan McDaid	(Scotland) Dundee	Loan
(Scotland) Scott Cowie	(Scotland) Rangers	Loan
(Republic of Ireland) Jaze Kabia	(Scotland) Livingston	Loan
(Republic of Ireland) Jevon Mills	(England) Hull City	Loan
(South Africa) Keaghan Jacobs	(Scotland) Livingston	Loan

=== Loans out ===
Player	To	Fee
(Scotland) Luke Holt	(Scotland) Gretna F.C. 2008	Loan
(Scotland) Blair Sneddon	(Scotland) Gretna F.C. 2008	Loan
(Scotland) Anton Dowds	(Scotland) Arbroath	Loan
(Scotland) Blair Sneddon	(Scotland) East Stirlingshire	Loan
(Scotland) Ben Weekes	(Scotland) Penicuik Athletic	Loan
(Scotland) Cammy Williamson	(Scotland) Bo'ness Athletic	Loan
(England) Samuel Ompreon	(Scotland) Cowdenbeath	Loan

== See also ==
- List of Falkirk F.C. seasons
