= Curtis Main =

English footballer (born 1992)

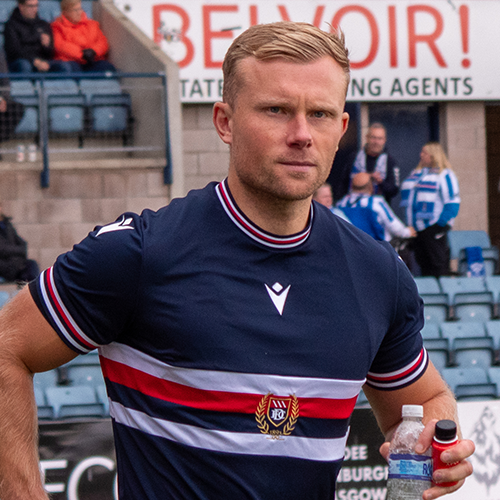
- Main training with Dundee in 2024

Personal information
- Full name: Curtis Lee Main
- Date of birth: 20 June 1992 (age 34)
- Place of birth: South Shields, England
- Height: 5 ft 10 in (1.78 m)
- Position: Striker

Team information
- Current team: Brechin City

Youth career
- ?–2005: Sunderland
- 2005–2007: Darlington

Senior career*
Years	Team	Apps	(Gls)
2007–2011	Darlington	61	(5)
2011–2014	Middlesbrough	48	(6)
2013	→ Shrewsbury Town (loan)	5	(0)
2014–2016	Doncaster Rovers	48	(9)
2016	→ Oldham Athletic (loan)	18	(4)
2016–2018	Portsmouth	17	(2)
2018–2019	Motherwell	47	(8)
2019–2021	Aberdeen	32	(6)
2021	Shrewsbury Town	20	(2)
2021–2023	St Mirren	68	(11)
2023–2024	Bengaluru	8	(2)
2024–2025	Dundee	28	(2)
2025–2026	Ayr United	28	(6)
2026	→ Greenock Morton (loan)	10	(2)
2026–	Brechin City	0	(0)
- * Club domestic league appearances and goals as of 14:39, 25 September 2026 (UTC)

Curtis Lee Main (born 20 June 1992) is an English professional footballer who plays as a striker for Lowland League East club Brechin City.

Main previously played in the Football League and the Football Conference for Darlington, and spent three seasons with Middlesbrough, from where he had a loan spell at Shrewsbury Town in 2013. He then joined Doncaster Rovers, and after a loan spell at Oldham Athletic in 2016, he signed for Portsmouth, whom he helped gain promotion to League One. He joined Motherwell in January 2018. He has since played for Scottish clubs Aberdeen, St Mirren, Dundee, Ayr United and Greenock Morton, as well as Indian Super League club Bengaluru and a second spell at Shrewsbury Town.

== Career ==
=== Darlington ===
Main was born in South Shields, Tyne and Wear. He attended St Mary's Church of England school in Tyne Dock, South Shields. He began his football career as a youngster at Sunderland before being released to League Two club Darlington, for whom he made his senior debut as a substitute in the last seven minutes of the game against Peterborough United on 3 May 2008. At 15 years 318 days, he became the youngest player to play for Darlington. In February 2009, he scored his first goal, the 86th-minute winner in a match against Grimsby Town, only two minutes after entering the game as a substitute. In May 2009, Main spent a week on trial with Premier League club Fulham, but the club preferred to monitor the player's progress rather than make an offer. Other clubs reported to be interested included Middlesbrough and Newcastle United. In September 2009, Main scored an 81st-minute equaliser against Grimsby Town, in a match that ended 1–1 and saw Darlington manager Colin Todd leave his post shortly after the final whistle.

In the early part of the 2010–11 season, Main had trials with Bury. In April 2011, after his contract was paid up by Darlington and he left the club, he joined Hartlepool United on trial.

=== Middlesbrough ===
After a trial with Middlesbrough, Main joined the Championship club on 12 May 2011, signing a one-year contract with an option for a second year. Manager Tony Mowbray described him as "a powerful lad", and said they intended to "mould him into a first-team player over the next couple of years". He made his debut on 4 February 2012, replacing Marvin Emnes in the 50th minute of a 0–0 draw with Crystal Palace, and his first start four days later, in a 2–1 defeat to Sunderland in the fourth round of the FA Cup. He scored his first goal for the club on 21 February, coming off the bench to score in a 3–1 win away to Millwall. On 14 April, he scored a late goal in a 1–0 win against Derby County. On 9 February 2013, he scored his first goal of the 2012–13 season on his third appearance, in a 3–2 loss to Barnsley. Three days later, he scored in the 81st minute of a 1–0 win over Leeds United, but within minutes was sent off after receiving two yellow cards for kicking the ball away and deliberate handball.

According to Mowbray, Main "came here on trial and trained with the youth team and you could see the power and speed he's got. His finishing with both feet is breathtaking at times. Whether the ball drops to his right foot or left foot, he doesn't hesitate. ... Physicality isn't going to be an issue for Curtis throughout his career. He's a boy who spends a lot of time looking after his physique and he's very, very strong."

==== Loan to Shrewsbury Town ====
On 30 August 2013, Main joined League One club Shrewsbury Town on loan for an initial month. He made his Shrewsbury debut the following day as a substitute against Coventry City and provided the assist for Tom Bradshaw in a 1–1 draw. His loan period was not extended, and he returned to Middlesbrough on 3 October having made six appearances for Shrewsbury in all competitions.

=== Doncaster Rovers ===
On 30 July 2014, Main signed a three-year contract with League One club Doncaster Rovers. The transfer was part of the deal by which James Husband joined Middlesbrough from Doncaster for an undisclosed fee.

==== Loan to Oldham ====
Main joined Oldham Athletic of League One on 15 February 2016 on loan until the end of the season. In March, Doncaster attempted to recall Main, but all parties had to agree on his return, and Main refused. With Oldham and Doncaster both trying to avoid relegation to League Two, Doncaster manager Darren Ferguson considered Main's decision "unfortunate". After Main helped Oldham stay up while his parent club did not, he was transfer-listed at the end of the season.

=== Portsmouth ===
On 4 July 2016, Main signed a two-year contract with League Two club Portsmouth. The fee was undisclosed. He scored his first goal for Portsmouth on his debut, in a 3–2 EFL Cup loss against Coventry City on 9 August, and continued as a regular member of the matchday squad, scoring 5 goals from 14 appearances, before back and hamstring problems put paid to his season. After Portsmouth gained promotion to League One as League Two champions, Main played little, unable to dislodge Brett Pitman and Ollie Hawkins from the starting eleven, and in January 2018 he was allowed to leave by mutual consent.

=== Motherwell ===
Main joined Scottish Premiership club Motherwell on 3 January 2018 on an 18-month deal. He made his debut for Motherwell on 20 January, in a 2–0 win against Hamilton Academical in the Scottish Cup. His first goal for the club came in a 2–0 win at home to Ross County. He followed this up with goals in his next two matches, away to Heart of Midlothian and Hibernian. On 14 April 2018, Main scored twice in a Scottish Cup semi-final as Motherwell beat Aberdeen 3–0 to reach their second cup final of the season.

=== Aberdeen ===
On 5 June 2019, Main joined fellow Scottish Premiership club Aberdeen on a two-year deal.

=== Shrewsbury Town ===
Main joined English League One club Shrewsbury Town on 1 February 2021 until the end of the season. He scored his first goal on 23 February in a 4–2 win over MK Dons, and scored twice from 20 league matches before leaving the club following the expiry of his contract.

=== St Mirren ===
Main returned to Scotland and signed a two-year deal with Scottish Premiership club St Mirren on 7 June 2021.

=== Bengaluru ===
On 18 July 2023, Main signed for Indian Super League club Bengaluru on a one-year contract, with the option to extend for a further year.

=== Dundee ===
On 17 January 2024, after agreeing to mutually part ways with Bengaluru, Main returned to Scotland with Scottish Premiership club Dundee on an 18-month deal. He made his debut on 20 January, as a substitute in a Scottish Cup game away to Kilmarnock.

Main opened his scoring account with Dundee on 13 July 2024 in style, scoring a hat-trick in a 7–1 away victory over Bonnyrigg Rose in the Scottish League Cup group stage. Main scored his first league goal for Dundee on 31 August against former club St Mirren.

=== Ayr United ===
On 25 January 2025, Main's Dundee contract was terminated by mutual consent and he signed an 18-month contract with Scottish Championship club Ayr United. Main made his debut for the Honest Men the same day, coming on as a substitute in a league win over Partick Thistle. On 1 March, Main scored his first goals for Ayr United, netting a brace in a home league win over Airdrieonians.

==== Greenock Morton (loan) ====
On January deadline day in February 2026, Main joined fellow Scottish Championship club Greenock Morton on loan until the end of the season. Main made 10 appearances and scored twice for the Ton, including a late equaliser against Airdrieonians which confirmed their Scottish Championship safety. Main left Ayr United after the club confirmed he was out of contract in May 2026.

=== Brechin City ===
On 25 September 2026, Main joined Lowland League East club Brechin City on a short-term deal until January 2027.

== Career statistics ==
As of match played 1 May 2026

Appearances and goals by club, season and competition
Club	Season	League			National cup (Note: Includes FA Cup, Scottish Cup)		League cup (Note: Includes Football League Cup/EFL Cup, Scottish League Cup)		Other		Total	
Club	Season	Division	Apps	Goals	Apps	Goals	Apps	Goals	Apps	Goals	Apps	Goals
Darlington	2007–08	League Two	1	0	0	0	0	0	0	0	1	0
Darlington	2008–09	League Two	18	2	0	0	1	0	0	0	19	2
Darlington	2009–10	League Two	26	3	1	0	1	0	1 (Note: Appearances in Football League Trophy)	0	29	3
Darlington	2010–11	Conference Premier	16	0	1	0	—		3 (Note: Appearances in FA Trophy)	2	20	2
Darlington	Total		61	5	2	0	2	0	4	2	69	7
Middlesbrough	2011–12	Championship	12	2	1	0	0	0	—		13	2
Middlesbrough	2012–13	Championship	13	3	1	0	0	0	—		14	3
Middlesbrough	2013–14	Championship	23	1	1	0	1	0	—		25	1
Middlesbrough	Total		48	6	3	0	1	0	0	0	52	6
Shrewsbury Town (loan)	2013–14	League One	5	0	—		—		1	0	6	0
Doncaster Rovers	2014–15	League One	38	8	4	2	1	0	1	0	44	10
Doncaster Rovers	2015–16	League One	10	1	1	0	2	0	1	0	14	1
Doncaster Rovers	Total		48	9	5	2	3	0	2	0	58	11
Oldham Athletic (loan)	2015–16	League One	18	4	—		—		—		18	4
Portsmouth	2016–17	League Two	12	2	0	0	1	1	1 (Note: Appearances in EFL Trophy)	2	14	5
Portsmouth	2017–18	League One	5	0	0	0	0	0	4	1	9	1
Portsmouth	Total		17	2	0	0	1	1	5	3	23	6
Motherwell	2017–18	Scottish Premiership	16	5	5	3	—		—		21	8
Motherwell	2018–19	Scottish Premiership	31	3	1	0	5	3	—		37	6
Motherwell	Total		47	8	6	3	5	3	0	0	58	14
Aberdeen	2019–20	Scottish Premiership	18	4	4	0	0	0	3 (Note: Appearances in UEFA Europa League)	0	25	4
Aberdeen	2020–21	Scottish Premiership	14	2	0	0	1	0	2	1	17	3
Aberdeen	Total		32	6	4	0	1	0	5	1	42	7
Shrewsbury Town	2020–21	League One	20	2	—		—		—		20	2
St Mirren	2021–22	Scottish Premiership	31	2	0	0	4	2	—		35	4
St Mirren	2022–23	Scottish Premiership	37	9	2	0	0	0	—		39	9
St Mirren	Total		68	11	2	0	4	2	0	0	74	13
Bengaluru	2023–24	Indian Super League	8	2	—		—		—		8	2
Dundee	2023–24	Scottish Premiership	14	0	1	0	—		0	0	15	0
Dundee	2024–25	Scottish Premiership	14	2	0	0	6	4	0	0	20	6
Dundee	Total		28	2	1	0	6	4	0	0	35	6
Ayr United	2024–25	Scottish Championship	12	4	1	0	—		2 (Note: Appearance(s) in the Scottish Premiership play-offs)	0	15	4
Ayr United	2025–26	Scottish Championship	16	2	2	1	5	3	0	0	23	6
Ayr United	Total		28	6	3	1	5	3	2	0	38	10
Greenock Morton	2025–26	Scottish Championship	10	2	—		—		0	0	10	2
Career total			438	65	26	6	28	13	19	6	511	90

== Honours ==
Portsmouth

- EFL League Two: 2016–17
