= Callumn Morrison =

Scottish footballer (born 1999)

Personal information
- Date of birth: 5 July 1999 (age 27)
- Place of birth: Alva, Scotland
- Height: 1.73 m (5 ft 8 in)
- Position: Winger

Team information
- Current team: Dunfermline Athletic
- Number: 38

Youth career
- 2013–2015: Heart of Midlothian

Senior career*
| Years | Team | Apps | (Gls) |
| 2015–2020 | Heart of Midlothian | 35 | (3) |
| 2016–2017 | → Stirling Albion (loan) | 17 | (1) |
| 2017–2018 | → Stirling Albion (loan) | 18 | (9) |
| 2018 | → Brechin City (loan) | 13 | (1) |
| 2020 | → East Fife (loan) | 8 | (0) |
| 2020–2025 | Falkirk | 124 | (61) |
| 2025–2026 | Linfield | 28 | (9) |
| 2026– | Dunfermline Athletic | 14 | (7) |

International career^{‡}
| 2015 | Scotland U17 | 5 | (2) |
- * Club domestic league appearances and goals as of 4 May 2026 ‡ National team caps and goals as of 15th January 2023

Callumn Morrison (born 5 July 1999) is a Scottish footballer who plays as a forward for Scottish Championship club Dunfermline Athletic. He has also played for Heart of Midlothian, Falkirk and Linfield, and had loan spells with Stirling Albion, Brechin City and East Fife.

Morrison grew up in the Alva area and attended Alva Academy.

== Career ==
Morrison made his league debut for Hearts on 22 August 2015, in a 3–0 win against Partick Thistle. He was loaned to Stirling Albion in the 2016–17 and 2017–18 seasons.

On 26 January 2018, Morrison extended his contract at Hearts until 2020. That same day, he moved on loan to Scottish Championship club Brechin City. He made his debut the following day in a 3–1 defeat against Queen of the South.

On 10 August 2020, Morrison signed for Falkirk, on a one-year deal. He signed a further year extension on 20 November 2020. In his first season at Falkirk, he finished as the club's top goalscorer scoring nine goals in twenty-six games in competitive competitions.

On 19 August 2021, Morrison signed a new two-year deal with Falkirk. In the 2023-2024 season Morrison finished as league one top goal scorer.

In February 2025 Morrison moved to Northern Irish Premier League side Linfield on a two and a half year deal, Scoring 12 goals in 33 appearances. Morrison failed to settle in Northern Ireland with a young family at home in Scotland and less than a year later he signed for Scottish Championship side and former rivals Dunfermline Athletic. He made his debut for the Pars in a victory over Scottish Premiership side Hibernian in the Scottish Cup, one day after signing.

== International career ==
Morrison played for the Scotland under-17 during the 2015–16 season.

== Career statistics ==
As of match played 19 January 2026

Appearances and goals by club, season and competition
| Club | Season | League | | | Scottish Cup | | League Cup | | Other | | Total | |
| Club | Season | Division | Apps | Goals | Apps | Goals | Apps | Goals | Apps | Goals | Apps | Goals |
|---|---|---|---|---|---|---|---|---|---|---|---|---|
| Heart of Midlothian | 2015–16 | Scottish Premiership | 1 | 0 | 0 | 0 | 1 | 0 | 0 | 0 | 2 | 0 |
| Heart of Midlothian | 2016–17 | Scottish Premiership | 0 | 0 | 0 | 0 | 0 | 0 | 0 | 0 | 0 | 0 |
| Heart of Midlothian | 2017–18 | Scottish Premiership | 0 | 0 | 0 | 0 | 0 | 0 | – | | 0 | 0 |
| Heart of Midlothian | 2018–19 | Scottish Premiership | 25 | 1 | 3 | 0 | 7 | 0 | – | | 35 | 1 |
| Heart of Midlothian | 2019–20 | Scottish Premiership | 4 | 0 | 0 | 0 | 1 | 0 | – | | 5 | 0 |
| Heart of Midlothian | Hearts Total | | 30 | 1 | 3 | 0 | 9 | 0 | 0 | 0 | 42 | 1 |
| Stirling Albion (loan) | 2016–17 | Scottish League Two | 15 | 0 | 1 | 0 | 0 | 0 | 0 | 0 | 16 | 0 |
| Stirling Albion (loan) | 2017–18 | Scottish League Two | 16 | 8 | 0 | 0 | 4 | 2 | 0 | 0 | 20 | 10 |
| Brechin City (loan) | 2017–18 | Scottish Championship | 12 | 0 | 0 | 0 | 0 | 0 | 0 | 0 | 12 | 0 |
| East Fife (loan) | 2019–20 | Scottish League One | 6 | 0 | 0 | 0 | 0 | 0 | 0 | 0 | 6 | 0 |
| Falkirk | 2020–21 | Scottish League One | 22 | 6 | 0 | 0 | 4 | 3 | — | | 26 | 9 |
| Falkirk | 2021–22 | Scottish League One | 20 | 8 | 1 | 1 | 2 | 2 | 1 (Note: Appearance(s) in Scottish Challenge Cup) | 0 | 24 | 11 |
| Falkirk | 2022–23 | Scottish League One | 35 | 12 | 4 | 2 | 5 | 1 | 4 (Note: Two appearances in Scottish Challenge Cup, two appearances in Scottish League One play-offs) | 0 | 48 | 15 |
| Falkirk | 2023–24 | Scottish League One | 32 | 23 | 2 | 0 | 4 | 0 | 3 | 2 | 37 | 24 |
| Falkirk | 2024–25 | Scottish Championship | 12 | 3 | 2 | 2 | 3 | 1 | 0 | 0 | 17 | 6 |
| Falkirk | Falkirk Total | | 118 | 52 | 9 | 5 | 18 | 7 | 8 | 2 | 152 | 65 |
| Linfield | 2024–25 | NIFL Premiership | 10 | 2 | 0 | 0 | 0 | 0 | 0 | 0 | 10 | 2 |
| Linfield | 2025–26 | NIFL Premiership | 12 | 2 | 1 | 0 | 3 | 3 | 7 (Note: Two appearances in County Antrim Shield, two appearances in UEFA Champions League Qualifying Rounds, two appearances in UEFA Conference League Qualifying Rounds one appearance in NIFL Charity Shield) | 5 | 23 | 10 |
| Linfield | Linfield Total | | 22 | 4 | 1 | 0 | 3 | 3 | 7 | 5 | 33 | 12 |
| Dunfermline Athletic | 2025-26 | Scottish Championship | 0 | 0 | 1 | 0 | 0 | 0 | 0 | 0 | 1 | 0 |
| Dunfermline Athletic | Dunfermline Total | | 0 | 0 | 1 | 0 | 0 | 0 | 0 | 0 | 1 | 0 |
| Career total | | | 213 | 65 | 15 | 5 | 34 | 12 | 15 | 7 | 282 | 88 |

== Honours ==
Falkirk

- Scottish League One: 2023–24
