= Jack McIntyre (English footballer) =

English footballer (born 2002)

Personal information
- Date of birth: 18 October 2002 (age 24)
- Place of birth: Manchester, England
- Height: 1.90 m (6 ft 3 in)
- Position: Goalkeeper

Team information
- Current team: Marine
- Number: 33

Youth career
- –2017: Manchester City
- 2017–2021: Everton
- 2021–2022: Sunderland

Senior career*
Years	Team	Apps	(Gls)
2021–2022	Sunderland	0	(0)
2022	→ Radcliffe (loan)	4	(0)
2022–2023	Larne	3	(0)
2023	Radcliffe	13	(0)
2023–2024	Accrington Stanley	3	(0)
2023	→ Dartford (loan)	2	(0)
2024–2025	Ayr United	1	(0)
2025	Carrick Rangers	7	(0)
2025-	Marine	10	(0)
- * Club domestic league appearances and goals as of 12:51, 26 April 2025 (UTC)

Jack Cameron McIntyre (born 18 October 2002) is an English semi-professional footballer who plays as a goalkeeper for Marine.

== Career ==
=== Sunderland ===
On 26 August 2021, McIntyre joined Sunderland on a one-year contract following his release from Everton. On 13 January 2022, McIntyre joined Radcliffe on a 28-day emergency loan.

=== Accrington Stanley ===
On 11 August 2023, McIntyre joined Accrington Stanley on a one-year contract. On 12 August 2023, McIntyre joined Dartford on a month loan. He made his league debut in a 2–0 loss against Tranmere Rovers on 23 September 2023, coming off the bench in the 45+6 minute. On 30 April 2024, it was announced McIntyre will be leaving the club at the end of his contract.

=== Ayr United ===
On 6 September 2024, McIntyre joined Ayr United on a contract until January 2025.

=== Carrick Rangers ===
After leaving Scottish club Ayr United in January 2025, McIntrye signed for Carrick Rangers. In March 2025, McIntrye was accused of pushing over a ballboy, with the police investigating the incident. McIntyre later apologised.
