= Jay Henderson (footballer) =

Scottish footballer (born 2002)

Personal information
- Date of birth: 21 February 2002 (age 24)
- Place of birth: Irvine, Scotland
- Position: Midfielder

Team information
- Current team: Coleraine

Youth career
- 2015–2020: St Mirren

Senior career*
Years	Team	Apps	(Gls)
2020–2023	St Mirren	27	(2)
2020–2021	→ Clyde (loan)	4	(0)
2023	→ Inverness Caledonian Thistle (loan)	16	(4)
2023–2026	Ross County	36	(4)
2024–2025	→ Ayr United (loan)	35	(7)
- * Club domestic league appearances and goals as of 3 May 2026

Jay Henderson (born 21 February 2002) is a Scottish professional footballer who plays as a midfielder last playing for Ross County. He started his career at St Mirren and had loan speels at Clyde and Inverness Caledonian Thistle before moving to Ross County on a permanent transfer and subsequently having a loan spell at Ayr United.

== Career ==
Raised in Kilmarnock, Henderson began his career in the youth system at St Mirren; he was loaned to Clyde in September 2020. He made his first team debut for St Mirren in a 1–0 Scottish Premiership defeat to Motherwell on 10 April 2021.

On 30 December 2022, Henderson joined Scottish Championship side Inverness Caledonian Thistle on loan until the end of the season.

On 30 June 2023 Henderson joined Scottish Premiership side Ross County for an undisclosed fee. Following Ross County's relegation to Scottish League One it was announsed that Henderson along with five other players would not be having there contract renewed by the club.

In June 2024, Henderson joined Scottish Championship club Ayr United on a season-long loan deal.

== Personal life ==
His father Darren was also a footballer.

== Career statistics ==
As of match played 9 January 2026

Appearances and goals by club, season and competition
Club	Season	League			Cup		League Cup		Other		Total	
Club	Season	Division	Apps	Goals	Apps	Goals	Apps	Goals	Apps	Goals	Apps	Goals
St Mirren B	2018-19	—			—		—		1 (Note: Appearance(s) in Scottish Challenge Cup)	0	1	0
St Mirren B	2019-20	—			—		—		3	1	3	1
St Mirren B	2022-23	—			—		—		1	0	1	0
St Mirren B	Total		—		—		—		5	1	5	1
St Mirren	2019-20	Scottish Premiership	0	0	0	0	0	0	—		0	0
St Mirren	2020-21	Scottish Premiership	5	0	2	0	0	0	—		7	0
St Mirren	2021-22	Scottish Premiership	19	2	3	0	4	0	—		26	2
St Mirren	2022-23	Scottish Premiership	3	0	0	0	2	0	—		5	0
St Mirren	Total		27	2	5	0	6	0	—		38	2
Clyde (loan)	2020-21	Scottish League One	4	0	0	0	2	0	—		6	0
Inverness Caledonian Thistle (loan)	2022-23	Scottish Championship	16	4	5	0	0	0	—		21	4
Ross County	2023-24	Scottish Premiership	8	0	1	0	5	1	1 (Note: Appearance(s) in Scottish Premiership play-offs)	0	15	1
Ross County	2024-25	Scottish Premiership	0	0	0	0	0	0	—		0	0
Ross County	2025-26	Scottish Championship	28	4	2	0	4	3	2	1	36	8
Ross County	Total		36	4	3	0	9	4	3	1	51	9
Ayr United (loan)	2024-25	Scottish Championship	35	7	3	3	4	3	5 (Note: 3 appearances 1 goal in Scottish Challenge Cup, 2 appearances in Scottish Premiership play-offs)	1	47	14
Career total			118	17	16	3	21	7	11	3	166	29
