= 2023–24 Ayr United F.C. season =

Ayr United
2023–24 season
- Chairman: David Smith
- Manager: Lee Bullen (until 15 January); Scott Brown (from 23 January)
- Stadium: Somerset Park
- Scottish Championship: 7th
- Scottish Cup: Fifth round
- Scottish League Cup: Second round
- Scottish Challenge Cup: Third round
- Top goalscorer: League: Anton Dowds (13); All: Anton Dowds (13)
- Highest home attendance: 3,103, vs. Dundee United, Championship, 26 August 2023
- Lowest home attendance: 757, vs. Stenhousemuir, League Cup, 18 July 2023
- Average home league attendance: 2,114
Home colours	Away colours	Third colours

The 2023–24 season was Ayr United's sixth consecutive season in the Scottish Championship after being promoted from league one in the 2017–18 season. Ayr also competed in the, League Cup, Challenge Cup and the Scottish Cup.

== Summary ==
=== Season ===
Lee Bullen takes charge of Ayr United for the second season in a row following their defeat to Partick Thistle in the semi-final of the Premiership play-off.

On 21 July, the club announced the singing of veteran winger Aiden McGeady on a two-year contract to serve as both a member of the playing squad and the club's technical manager.

On 15 January, manager Lee Bullen was sacked following a run of poor results. He was replaced by former Celtic captain Scott Brown.

== Results and fixtures ==
Win Draw Loss Postponed

=== Pre-season ===
8 July 2023	Ayr United	2–0	Stranraer	Ayr
13:30	Murphy 18'; McAllister 90'			Stadium: Dam Park

11 July 2023	East Kilbride	0–2	Ayr United	East Kilbride
19:30			McKenzie 3'; Murphy 53'	Stadium: K-Park Training Academy

22 July 2023	Troon	1–1	Ayr United	Troon
15:00				Stadium: Portland Park
Note: Testimonial match for Dean Keenan

=== Scottish Championship ===
5 August 2023 1	Greenock Morton	3–1	Ayr United	Greenock
15:00	Crawford 62'; Muirhead 75' (pen.); Boyd 87'	Report	Pendlebury 51'	Stadium: Cappielow; Attendance: 2,512; Referee: Matthew MacDermid

12 August 2023 2	Ayr United	1–0	Inverness CT	Ayr
15:00	Amartey 8'	Report		Stadium: Somerset Park; Attendance: 1,989; Referee: Peter Stuart

26 August 2023 3	Ayr United	0–3	Dundee United	Ayr
15:00		Report	Holt 58', 90'; Moult 62'	Stadium: Somerset Park; Attendance: 3,103; Referee: Nick Walsh

2 September 2023 4	Arbroath	2–1	Ayr United	Arbroath
15:00	Bird 21'; Hylton 82'	Report	Rose 45+3'	Stadium: Gayfield Park; Attendance: 1,643; Referee: Colin Steven

15 September 2023 5	Ayr United	0–4	Partick Thistle	Ayr
19:45		Report	Graham 2'; Lawless 58', 67'; Adeloye 81'	Stadium: Somerset Park; Attendance: 2,078; Referee: William Collum

22 September 2023 6	Queen's Park	2–5	Ayr United	Glasgow
19:45	Paton 28'; Hepburn 52'	Report	Chalmers 6', 12'; Rose 32'; Murphy 44'; Dowds 53'	Stadium: Hampden Park; Attendance: 1,651; Referee: David Dickinson

30 September 2023 7	Ayr United	1–2	Raith Rovers	Ayr
15:00	Dowds 50'	Report	Easton 23', 26'	Stadium: Somerset Park; Attendance: 1,848; Referee: David Munro

7 October 2023 8	Airdrieonians	1–2	Ayr United	Airdrie
15:00	McGregor 67'	Report	Chalmers 21'; Dowds 53'	Stadium: Excelsior Stadium; Attendance: 1,618; Referee: Iain Snedden

21 October 2023 9	Dunfermline Athletic	0–1	Ayr United	Dunfermline
15:00		Report	Chalmers 10'	Stadium: East End Park; Attendance: 5,073; Referee: David Munro

28 October 2023 10	Ayr United	0–1	Greenock Morton	Ayr
15:00		Report	Oakley 87'	Stadium: Somerset Park; Attendance: 2,212; Referee: Peter Stuart

31 October 2023 11	Partick Thistle	2–2	Ayr United	Glasgow
19:45	Graham 17'; Milne 47'	Report	Murphy 19', 75' (pen.)	Stadium: Firhill Stadium; Attendance: 2,428; Referee: Ross Hardie

4 November 2023 12	Ayr United	2–2	Queen's Park	Ayr
15:00	Dowds 23', 38'	Report	Bannon 58'; Paton 90+5'	Stadium: Somerset Park; Attendance: 2,046; Referee: William Collum

11 November 2023 13	Inverness CT	3–1	Ayr United	Inverness
15:00	Wotherspoon 32', 43'; Mckay 45+3' (pen.)	Report	Murphy 61' (pen.)	Stadium: Caledonian Stadium; Attendance: 2,259; Referee: Iain Snedden

9 December 2023 15	Dundee United	1–0	Ayr United	Dundee
15:00	Fotheringham 37'	Report		Stadium: Tannadice Park; Attendance: 7,000; Referee: Nick Walsh

16 December 2023 16	Ayr United	1–0	Airdrieonians	Ayr
15:00	Dowds 15'	Report		Stadium: Somerset Park; Attendance: 1,726; Referee: Peter Stuart

22 December 2023 17	Raith Rovers	4–4	Ayr United	Kirkcaldy
19:45	Stanton 30'; Vaughan 45', 81' (pen.), 90+1'	Report	McGeady 10'; McGinty (red card) 43'; Dempsey 55'; Chalmers 63'; Rose 85'	Stadium: Stark's Park; Attendance: 3,698; Referee: Craig Napier

30 December 2023 18	Ayr United	2–2	Dunfermline Athletic	Ayr
15:00	McGeady 41'; Stanger 63'	Report	Jakubiak 3', 9'	Stadium: Somerset Park; Attendance: 2,022; Referee: Ross Hardie

2 January 2024 19	Greenock Morton	3–0	Ayr United	Greenock
15:00	Muirhead 35', 57', 59'	Report		Stadium: Cappielow; Attendance: 2,252; Referee: Duncan Williams

6 January 2024 20	Ayr United	1–3	Inverness CT	Ayr
15:00	Chalmers 65'	Report	McKay 29'; Boyes 55', 63'	Stadium: Somerset Park; Attendance: 1,826; Referee: Gavin Duncan

13 January 2024 21	Arbroath	0–0	Ayr United	Arbroath
15:00		Report		Stadium: Gayfield Park; Attendance: 1,598; Referee: Euan Anderson

23 January 2024 14	Ayr United	2–0	Arbroath	Ayr
19:45	Dempsey 74'; Chalmers 77'	Report		Stadium: Somerset Park; Attendance: 1,115; Referee: Calum Scott
Note: Match postponed due to a frozen pitch.

27 January 2024 22	Queen's Park	1–2	Ayr United	Glasgow
15:00	Paton 63'; Welsh (red card) 65'	Report	Murphy 40'; McKenzie 74'	Stadium: Hampden Park; Attendance: 1,927; Referee: Steven Kirkland

3 February 2024 23	Ayr United	1–2	Dundee United	Ayr
15:00	Jamie Murphy 2'; Stanger (red card) 90+1'	Report	Watt 67'; Docherty 82'	Stadium: Somerset Park; Attendance: 2,943; Referee: Gavin Duncan

17 February 2024 24	Airdrieonians	2–3	Ayr United	Airdrie
15:00	Ballantyne 26'; Watson 84'	Report	Dowds 9', 48', 78'	Stadium: Excelsior Stadium; Attendance: 1,820; Referee: Alan Muir

24 February 2024 25	Ayr United	1–2	Raith Rovers	Ayr
15:00	Syla 11'	Report	Rudden 5'; Vaughan 45+2'	Stadium: Somerset Park; Attendance: 2,276; Referee: Steven McLean

27 February 2024 26	Ayr United	4–3	Partick Thistle	Ayr
19:45	McAllister 15'; Willoughby 43', 45+2'; McHugh 84'	Report	Graham 33'; Adeloye 78'; Sanders 83' (o.g.)	Stadium: Somerset Park; Attendance: 2,227; Referee: Graham Grainger

2 March 2024 27	Dunfermline Athletic	2–0	Ayr United	Dunfermline
15:00	Hamilton 42'; Kane 45+1'	Report		Stadium: East End Park; Attendance: 5,050; Referee: Peter Stuart

16 March 2024 28	Inverness CT	1–2	Ayr United	Inverness
15:00	McKay 45+3' (pen.)	Report	Stanger 5'; Bryden 61'	Stadium: Caledonian Stadium; Attendance: 1,979; Referee: Iain Snedden

23 March 2024 29	Ayr United	1–2	Queen's Park	Ayr
15:00	Sanders 78'	Report	Paton 19'; Sheridan 59'	Stadium: Somerset Park; Attendance: 2,264; Referee: Colin Steven

29 March 2024 30	Ayr United	2–1	Airdrieonians	Ayr
19:45	Dowds 47'; McGinty 50'	Report	O'Connor 38'	Stadium: Somerset Park; Attendance: 1,871; Referee: David Munro

6 April 2024 31	Raith Rovers	2–1	Ayr United	Kirkcaldy
15:00	Easton 45+2'; Hamilton 65' (pen.)	Report	Chalmers 55'	Stadium: Stark's Park; Attendance: 3,579; Referee: Ross Hardie

9 April 2024 32	Ayr United	1–1	Greenock Morton	Ayr
19:45	Dowds 45'	Report	Broadfoot 21'	Stadium: Somerset Park; Attendance: 1,905; Referee: Iain Snedden

13 April 2024 33	Ayr United	5–0	Arbroath	Ayr
15:00	Willoughby 23' (pen.); Musonda 32'; Dowds 41' (pen.); Dempsey 68'; Chalmers 90'	Report		Stadium: Somerset Park; Attendance: 1,849; Referee: Scott Lambie

20 April 2024 34	Dundee United	1–0	Ayr United	Dundee
15:00	Mochrie 78'	Report	McAllister (red card) 59'	Stadium: Tannadice Park; Attendance: 10,025; Referee: Craig Napier

27 April 2024 35	Partick Thistle	0–0	Ayr United	Glasgow
15:00		Report		Stadium: Firhill Stadium; Attendance: 4,243; Referee: Matthew MacDermid

3 May 2024 36	Ayr United	3–3	Dunfermline Athletic	Ayr
19:45	McKenzie 21'; McRoberts 68'; Dowds 73'	Report	Kane 35', 42'; Edwards 45'	Stadium: Somerset Park; Attendance: 2,748; Referee: William Collum

=== Scottish League Cup ===
==== Group stage ====
15 July 2023 1	Stirling Albion	1–1 (3–4 p)	Ayr United	Stirling
15:00	McGeachie 21'	Report	Bryden 84'	Stadium: Forthbank Stadium; Attendance: 791; Referee: Steven Kirkland

18 July 2023 2	Ayr United	1–0	Stenhousemuir	Cumnock
15:00	McKenzie 27'	Report		Stadium: Townhead Park; Attendance: 757; Referee: William Collum

25 July 2023 2	St Johnstone	1–2	Ayr United	Perth
19:45	Kucheriavyi 43'	Report	Stanger 29'; Dempsey 71'	Stadium: McDiarmid Park; Attendance: 2,669; Referee: Nick Walsh

29 July 2023 4	Ayr United	6–0	Alloa Athletic	Ayr
15:00	Bryden 14', 62'; McAllister 37'; Murphy 45+1'; Pendlebury 70'; Rose 84'	Report	Hetherington (red card) 73'	Stadium: Somerset Park; Attendance: 1,498; Referee: Don Robertson

==== Knockout phase ====
19 August 2023 Second round	Livingston	2–0	Ayr United	Livingston
15:00	Nouble 12'; Montaño 64'	Report		Stadium: Tony Macaroni Arena; Attendance: 1,304; Referee: Kevin Clancy

=== Scottish Challenge Cup ===
5 September 2023 Third round	Ayr United	0–1	Falkirk	Ayr
19:45	Syla (red card) 70'	Report	Henderson 30'	Stadium: Somerset Park; Attendance: 1,423; Referee: Steve Kirkland

=== Scottish Cup ===
25 November 2023 Third round	Peterhead	1–2	Ayr United	Peterhead
15:00	Shanks 50'	Report	McGinty 90+6'; Bryden 116'	Stadium: Balmoor Stadium; Attendance: 820; Referee: Steven Kirkland

20 January 2024 Fourth round	Ayr United	3–0	Kelty Hearts	Ayr
15:00	Syla 62'; Rose 79'; McKenzie 90'	Report		Stadium: Somerset Park; Attendance: 1,623; Referee: Colin Steven

10 February 2024 Fifth round	Rangers	2–0	Ayr United	Glasgow
17:30	Barišić 10'; Silva 76'	Report		Stadium: Ibrox Stadium; Attendance: 43,454; Referee: William Collum

== Squad statistics ==
=== Appearances ===
As of 3 May 2024

No.	Pos	Nat	Player	Total		Championship		League Cup		Challenge Cup		Scottish Cup	
No.	Pos	Nat	Player	Apps	Goals	Apps	Goals	Apps	Goals	Apps	Goals	Apps	Goals
1	GK	(England) ENG	Charlie Albinson	22	0	17+1	0	2+0	0	0+0	0	2+0	0
2	DF	(Scotland) SCO	Nick McAllister	31	2	24+0	1	3+0	1	0+1	0	3+0	0
3	DF	(Scotland) SCO	Patrick Reading	32	0	24+0	0	4+1	0	0+0	0	3+0	0
4	DF	(Zambia) ZAM	Frankie Musonda	22	1	18+2	1	1+0	0	0+0	0	1+0	0
5	DF	(Republic of Ireland) IRL	Sean McGinty	41	3	31+1	2	5+0	0	1+0	0	3+0	1
6	MF	(Scotland) SCO	Andy Murdoch	4	0	1+0	0	3+0	0	0+0	0	0+0	0
8	MF	(England) ENG	Ben Dempsey	29	4	22+0	3	4+0	1	0+0	0	3+0	0
9	FW	(England) ENG	Kurt Willoughby	13	3	4+8	3	0+0	0	0+0	0	0+1	0
10	MF	(Republic of Ireland) IRL	Aiden McGeady	19	2	6+10	2	1+0	0	1+0	0	1+0	0
11	FW	(Scotland) SCO	Logan Chalmers	31	9	23+4	9	0+1	0	1+0	0	2+0	0
14	DF	(New Zealand) NZL	George Stanger	34	3	26+0	2	5+0	1	1+0	0	2+0	0
15	FW	(Scotland) SCO	Jamie Murphy	39	7	29+3	6	4+0	1	0+0	0	3+0	0
16	FW	(Scotland) SCO	Anton Dowds	31	13	28+0	13	0+0	0	0+0	0	3+0	0
17	FW	(England) ENG	Franny Amartey	34	1	8+20	1	4+1	0	0+0	0	1+0	0
18	MF	(Scotland) SCO	Paul Smith	21	0	4+11	0	3+1	0	0+0	0	1+1	0
20	MF	(Albania) ALB	Roy Syla	29	2	20+5	1	0+0	0	1+0	0	3+0	1
21	MF	(England) ENG	Harry McHugh	12	1	10+2	1	0+0	0	0+0	0	0+0	0
22	FW	(Scotland) SCO	Mark McKenzie	40	4	24+7	2	5+0	1	0+1	0	1+2	1
23	DF	(England) ENG	Jack Sanders	14	1	12+2	1	0+0	0	0+0	0	0+0	0
24	MF	(Scotland) SCO	Scott Tomlinson	18	0	2+10	0	0+3	0	0+1	0	0+2	0
25	DF	(England) ENG	Nathan McGinley	0	0	0+0	0	0+0	0	0+0	0	0+0	0
27	FW	(Scotland) SCO	Max Guthrie	1	0	0+0	0	0+0	0	0+0	0	0+1	0
29	FW	(Scotland) SCO	Lucas McRoberts	4	1	0+4	1	0+0	0	0+0	0	0+0	0
30	FW	(Scotland) SCO	Fraser Bryden	36	5	11+16	1	3+2	3	0+1	0	0+3	1
31	GK	(Scotland) SCO	Robbie Mutch	12	0	7+0	0	3+0	0	1+0	0	1+0	0
38	GK	(Northern Ireland) NIR	Josh Clarke	12	0	12+0	0	0+0	0	0+0	0	0+0	0
32	MF	(Scotland) SCO	Dylan Watret	1	0	0+0	0	1+0	0	0+0	0	0+0	0
Players who left the club during the 2023–24 season
9	FW	(Jamaica) JAM	Ahkeem Rose	23	5	8+11	3	1+1	1	1+0	0	0+1	1
16	MF	(England) ENG	Oliver Pendlebury	6	2	0+2	1	2+2	1	0+0	0	0+0	0
19	GK	(Scotland) SCO	Ollie Ecrepont	0	0	0+0	0	0+0	0	0+0	0	0+0	0
20	MF	(Scotland) SCO	Michael Hewitt	2	0	0+0	0	1+1	0	0+0	0	0+0	0
21	DF	(Scotland) SCO	Finn Ecrepont	8	0	0+3	0	1+2	0	1+0	0	0+1	0
23	FW	(England) ENG	Sam Ashford	6	0	1+1	0	0+4	0	0+0	0	0+0	0
23	MF	(Belgium) BEL	Jack Senga	11	0	5+5	0	0+0	0	1+0	0	0+0	0
29	MF	(Democratic Republic of the Congo) COD	David Bangala	1	0	0+0	0	0+1	0	0+0	0	0+0	0
33	MF	(Scotland) SCO	Carter Jenkins	0	0	0+0	0	0+0	0	0+0	0	0+0	0
34	FW	(Scotland) SCO	Dario Viviani	0	0	0+0	0	0+0	0	0+0	0	0+0	0
38	DF	(England) ENG	Elicha Ahui	14	0	9+3	0	0+0	0	1+0	0	0+1	0
46	MF	(England) ENG	Jack Young	19	0	11+6	0	0+0	0	1+0	0	0+1	0

== Team statistics ==
=== League table ===
Pos	Team	Pld	W	D	L	GF	GA	GD	Pts	Promotion, qualification or relegation
5	Greenock Morton	36	12	9	15	43	46	−3	45	
6	Dunfermline Athletic	36	11	12	13	43	48	−5	45	
7	Ayr United	36	12	8	16	53	61	−8	44	
8	Queen's Park	36	11	10	15	50	56	−6	43	
9	Inverness Caledonian Thistle (R)	36	10	12	14	41	40	+1	42	Qualification for the Championship play-offs

Rules for classification: 1) Points; 2) Goal difference; 3) Goals scored; 4) Head-to-to head points; 5) Head-to-head goal difference; 6) Play-off (only for deciding promotion, play-off participation and relegation).
(R) Relegated

=== League Cup table ===
Pos	Team	Pld	W	PW	PL	L	GF	GA	GD	Pts	Qualification	AYR	STI	STJ	STE	ALL
1	Ayr United	4	3	1	0	0	10	2	+8	11	Qualification for the second round	—	—	—	1–0	6–0
2	Stirling Albion	4	3	0	1	0	9	3	+6	10	Qualification for the second round	1–1p	—	—	2–1	—
3	St Johnstone	4	1	0	0	3	5	7	−2	3		1–2	0–4	—	—	—
4	Stenhousemuir	4	1	0	0	3	3	6	−3	3		—	—	1–0	—	1–3
5	Alloa Athletic	4	1	0	0	3	4	13	−9	3		—	1–2	0–4	—	—

Rules for classification: 1) goal difference, 2) goals scored, 3) away goals scored, 4) matches won, 5) away matches won, 6) drawing of lots.

== Transfers ==
=== Transfers in ===
Date	Position	Name	From	Fee	Ref.
5 June 2023	GK	Robbie Mutch	Edinburgh City	Free transfer	
6 June 2023	DF	(New Zealand) George Stanger	Alloa Athletic	Free transfer	
19 June 2023	FW	Jamie Murphy	St Johnstone	Free transfer	
24 June 2023	FW	(England) Franny Amartey	(England) Aldershot Town	Free transfer	
24 June 2023	MF	(England) Oliver Pendlebury	(England) Aldershot Town	Free transfer	
21 July 2023	MF	(Republic of Ireland) Aiden McGeady	Hibernian	Free transfer	
24 July 2023	FW	(Jamaica) Ahkeem Rose	(England) Weymouth	Free transfer	
29 August 2023	MF	(Albania) Roy Syla	(England) Brentford	Free transfer	
1 March 2024	DF	(England) Nathan McGinley	Motherwell	Free transfer	

=== Transfers out ===
Date	Position	Name	To	Fee	Ref.
31 May 2023	DF	Kinlay Bilham	Stenhousemuir	Free transfer	
31 May 2023	DF	Jordan Houston	Queen of the South	Free transfer	
31 May 2023	DF	Alex Jeanes		Free transfer	
31 May 2023	FW	Chris Maguire	(England) Eastleigh	Free transfer	
31 May 2023	GK	Aidan McAdams	Edinburgh City	Free transfer	
31 May 2023	MF	Josh Mullin	Raith Rovers	Free transfer	
24 June 2023	MF	(Republic of Ireland) Daire O'Connor	(Northern Ireland) Glentoran	Free transfer	
14 July 2023	MF	(England) Jayden Mitchell-Lawson	(England) Maidenhead United	Free transfer	
15 July 2023	FW	(England) Dipo Akinyemi	(England) York City	Undisclosed	
4 August 2023	MF	Michael Hewitt	Hamilton Academical	Free transfer	
8 August 2023	MF	(Democratic Republic of the Congo) David Bangala		Free transfer	
23 August 2023	FW	(England) Sam Ashford	(Northern Ireland) Cliftonville	Free transfer	
30 August 2023	MF	(England) Oliver Pendlebury	(England) Farnborough	Free transfer	
5 January 2024	DF	Finn Ecrepont	Stranraer	Free transfer	

=== Loans in ===
Date	Position	Name	From	End date	Ref.
4 August 2023	DF	(England) Elicha Ahui	(England) Lincoln City	1 February 2024	
19 August 2023	FW	Logan Chalmers	Dundee United	31 May 2024	
25 August 2023	MF	(England) Jack Young	(England) Wycombe Wanderers	16 January 2024	
1 September 2023	MF	(Belgium) Jack Senga	(England) Reading	22 January 2024	
12 September 2023	FW	Anton Dowds	Partick Thistle	31 May 2024	
26 January 2024	DF	(England) Jack Sanders	Kilmarnock	31 May 2024	
1 February 2024	MF	(England) Harry McHugh	(England) Wigan Athletic	31 May 2024	
1 February 2024	FW	(England) Kurt Willoughby	(England) Oldham Athletic	31 May 2024	
24 February 2024	GK	(Northern Ireland) Josh Clarke	Celtic	31 May 2024	

=== Loans out ===
Date	Position	Name	To	End date	Ref.
13 July 2023	DF	Lyall Holding	Glenafton Athletic	31 May 2024	
25 July 2023	MF	Carter Jenkins	Gretna 2008	31 May 2024	
25 July 2023	FW	Dario Viviani	Gretna 2008	31 May 2024	
3 August 2023	GK	Derren Fairns	Dalry Thistle	31 May 2024	
13 January 2024	GK	Ollie Ecrepont	East Stirlingshire	31 May 2024	
1 February 2024	FW	(Jamaica) Ahkeem Rose	Hamilton Academical	31 May 2024	
