= 2022−23 Ayr United F.C. season =

Ayr United
2022–23 season
- Chairman: David Smith
- Manager: Lee Bullen
- Stadium: Somerset Park
- Scottish Championship: 2nd
- Premiership play-offs: Semi-finals
- Scottish Cup: Quarter-finals
- Scottish League Cup: Group stage
- Scottish Challenge Cup: Third round
- Top goalscorer: League: Dipo Akinyemi (20); All: Dipo Akinyemi (24)
- Highest home attendance: 5,811 vs. Partick Thistle, Play-offs, 20 May 2023
- Lowest home attendance: 1,194 vs. Elgin City, League Cup, 9 July 2022
- Average home league attendance: 2,213
Home colours	Away colours	Third colours

The 2022–23 season was Ayr United's fifth consecutive season in the Scottish Championship after being promoted from league one in the 2017–18 season. Ayr also competed in the, League Cup, Challenge Cup and the Scottish Cup.

== Summary ==
=== Season ===
In their first full season under the management of Lee Bullen, Ayr United finished as runners-up in the Scottish Championship and thus progressed to the semi-final of the Premiership play-off. Ultimately their bid for promotion was ended by Partick Thistle who would on to win 8−0 on aggregate across the two legs.

== Results and fixtures ==
Win Draw Loss Postponed

=== Pre-season ===
23 June 2022	Ayr United	1−1	Dumbarton	Largs
19:00	McNiff 9' (o.g.)	Report	Love 12'	Stadium: National Sports Training Centre Inverclyde

25 June 2022	Ayr United	2−1	Stranraer	Kilwinning
12:00	Ashford 19'; Bryden 68'		Trialist 67'	Stadium: Kilwinning Sports Club

28 June 2022	Ayr United	3−0	Darvel	Largs
	Akinyemi 10', 19'; Murdoch 12'	Report		Stadium: National Sports Training Centre Inverclyde

30 June 2022	Ayr United	1−1	University of Washington	Cumnock
	Akinyemi 56'	Report	84'	Stadium: Townhead Park

18 August 2022	Ayr United	0−4	Young Queen's Park	Cumnock
15:00		Report	Connolly 47', 65'; Scott 62'; Longridge 75'	Stadium: Townhead Park

=== Scottish Championship ===
30 July 2022 1	Ayr United	0−0	Arbroath	Ayr
15:00		Report	O'Brien (red card) 81'	Stadium: Somerset Park; Attendance: 1,872; Referee: Chris Graham

5 August 2022 2	Queen's Park	2−3	Ayr United	Stenhousemuir
19:45	Murray 18'; Thomas 32'	Report	Akinyemi 46', 90+2' (pen.); McGinty 78'	Stadium: Ochilview Park; Attendance: 943; Referee: Matthew MacDermid

13 August 2022 3	Ayr United	2−2	Hamilton Academical	Ayr
15:00	Akinyemi 3'; Murdoch 85'	Report	Winter 14'; O'Reilly 73'	Stadium: Somerset Park; Attendance: 2,014; Referee: Gavin Duncan

20 August 2022 4	Cove Rangers	1−2	Ayr United	Cove Bay
15:00	Masson 90+2' (pen.)	Report	Dempsey 59' (pen.); Akinyemi 68'	Stadium: Balmoral Stadium; Attendance: 951; Referee: Scott Lambie

26 August 2022 5	Ayr United	3−1	Dundee	Ayr
19:45	Akinyemi 17', 67'; Houston 62'	Report	Rudden 4'; Sweeney (red card) 90+2'	Stadium: Somerset Park; Attendance: 2,274; Referee: Greg Aitken

3 September 2022 6	Greenock Morton	1−2	Ayr United	Greenock
15:00	Muirhead 80'	Report	Akinyemi 34'; McKeznie 74'	Stadium: Cappielow; Attendance: 1,935; Referee: Lloyd Wilson

17 September 2022 7	Raith Rovers	3−2	Ayr United	Kirkcaldy
15:00	Connell 8'; Stanton 35'; Brown 83'	Report	Young 51'; Murdoch 68'	Stadium: Stark's Park; Attendance: 2,045; Referee: Greg Aitken

1 October 2022 8	Ayr United	0−1	Inverness CT	Ayr
15:00		Report	Harper 47'	Stadium: Somerset Park; Attendance: 1,866; Referee: Colin Steven

8 October 2022 9	Ayr United	5−0	Queen's Park	Ayr
15:00	Akinyemi 6', 36', 53'; Young 59'; Dempsey 62'	Report		Stadium: Somerset Park; Attendance: 2,052; Referee: Don Robertson

15 October 2022 10	Dundee	2−1	Ayr United	Dundee
15:00	McMullan 38'; Robinson 49'	Report	Mullin 61'	Stadium: Dens Park; Attendance: 4,490; Referee: Grant Irvine

22 October 2022 11	Ayr United	2−2	Cove Rangers	Ayr
15:00	Akinyemi 29'; Kirk 37'	Report	Scully 31'; McDonagh 52'	Stadium: Somerset Park; Attendance: 1,847; Referee: Calum Scott

25 October 2022 12	Ayr United	4−2	Partick Thistle	Ayr
19:45	Chalmers 11'; Brownlie 39' (o.g.); Mullin 55'; McKenzie 90+1'	Report	Hodson 18'; Graham 51'	Stadium: Somerset Park; Attendance: 2,782; Referee: William Collum

29 October 2022 13	Arbroath	0−2	Ayr United	Arbroath
15:00		Report	Dempsey 70' (pen.); Mitchell-Lawson 89'	Stadium: Gayfield Park; Referee: Graham Grainger

5 November 2022 14	Ayr United	1−1	Greenock Morton	Ayr
15:00	Kirk 3'	Report	Quitongo 16'	Stadium: Somerset Park; Attendance: 2,819; Referee: Euan Anderson

11 November 2022 15	Hamilton Academical	2−3	Ayr United	Hamilton
19:45	Lawson 50' (pen.); Ecrepont 80' (o.g.)	Report	Akinyemi 4', 69'; Dempsey 83' (pen.)	Stadium: New Douglas Park; Attendance: 1,677; Referee: Matthew MacDermid

19 November 2022 16	Inverness CT	2−2	Ayr United	Inverness
15:00	Shaw 6', 87'	Report	McKenzie 66'; Akinyemi 82'	Stadium: Caledonian Stadium; Attendance: 2,066; Referee: Grant Irvine

3 December 2022 17	Ayr United	2−0	Raith Rovers	Ayr
15:00	Mullin 31', 70'	Report		Stadium: Somerset Park; Attendance: 2,094; Referee: Kevin Clancy

17 December 2022 18	Partick Thistle	3−2	Ayr United	Glasgow
15:00	Milne 21'; Graham 45+1'; Lawless 56'	Report	Akinyemi 9'; Chalmers 47'	Stadium: Firhill Stadium; Attendance: 2,831; Referee: David Munro

23 December 2022 19	Ayr United	0−2	Dundee	Ayr
19:45	Bangala (red card) 63'	Report	Mulligan (red card) 19'; McCowan 68', 84'	Stadium: Somerset Park; Attendance: 2,704; Referee: Steven McLean

7 January 2023 20	Ayr United	1−0	Hamilton Academical	Ayr
15:00	Mullin 32'	Report		Stadium: Somerset Park; Attendance: 1,988; Referee: Calum Scott

14 January 2023 21	Ayr United	2−2	Arbroath	Ayr
15:00	Dempsey 38' (pen.); McGinty 76'	Report	Adarkwa 57'; Ben El-Mhanni 63'	Stadium: Somerset Park; Attendance: 2,064; Referee: Craig Napier

27 January 2023 22	Cove Rangers	0−5	Ayr United	Aberdeen
19:45		Report	McAllister 21'; Dempsey 55'; Mullin 61', 89'; Bryden 82'	Stadium: Balmoral Stadium; Referee: Graham Grainger

3 February 2023 23	Queen's Park	2−0	Ayr United	Stenhousemuir
19:45	Thomas 59' (pen.); McAllister 79' (o.g.)	Report		Stadium: Ochilview Park; Attendance: 1,192; Referee: Steven McLean

18 February 2023 24	Ayr United	0−1	Partick Thistle	Ayr
15:00		Report	Mullen 32'	Stadium: Somerset Park; Attendance: 3,097; Referee: Nick Walsh

24 February 2023 25	Raith Rovers	0−0	Ayr United	Kirkcaldy
19:45		Report		Stadium: Stark's Park; Attendance: 1,939; Referee: Colin Steven

4 March 2023 26	Ayr United	1−2	Inverness CT	Ayr
15:00	Akinyemi 12'; O'Connor (red card) 29'	Report	Welsh 19'; Henderson 74'	Stadium: Somerset Park; Attendance: 1,820; Referee: Scott Lambie

7 March 2023 27	Greenock Morton	1−3	Ayr United	Greenock
19:45	Crawford 29'	Report	Ashford 7'; McGinty 34'; Akinyemi 43'	Stadium: Cappielow; Attendance: 2,309; Referee: Peter Stuart

18 March 2023 28	Hamilton Academical	0−2	Ayr United	Hamilton
15:00		Report	Dempsey 12' (pen.); Ashford 27'	Stadium: New Douglas Park; Attendance: 1,284; Referee: Calum Scott

21 March 2023 29	Dundee	3−1	Ayr United	Dundee
19:45	Sweeney 13'; Jakubiak 59'; McCowan 80'	Report	Akinyemi 17'	Stadium: Dens Park; Attendance: 4,007; Referee: Steven Kirkland

24 March 2023 30	Ayr United	3−0	Cove Rangers	Ayr
19:45	O'Connor 7'; Akinyemi 24'; Mitchell-Lawson 74'	Report		Stadium: Somerset Park; Attendance: 1,710; Referee: Craig Napier

31 March 2023 31	Arbroath	2−0	Ayr United	Arbroath
19:45	Hilson 27'; Gold 60'	Report		Stadium: Gayfield Park; Attendance: 1,759; Referee: Chris Graham

8 April 2023 32	Ayr United	1−1	Greenock Morton	Ayr
15:00	Musonda 62'	Report	Waters 47'; Oakley (red card) 72'	Stadium: Somerset Park; Attendance: 2,265; Referee: Colin Steven

15 April 2023 33	Partick Thistle	1−1	Ayr United	Glasgow
15:00	Tiffoney 14'	Report	Akinyemi 72'	Stadium: Firhill Stadium; Attendance: 4,102; Referee: Grant Irvine

21 April 2023 34	Ayr United	0–0	Queen's Park	Ayr
19:45		Report		Stadium: Somerset Park; Attendance: 2,230; Referee: Steven McLean

29 April 2023 35	Ayr United	1–0	Raith Rovers	Ayr
15:00	Musonda 55'	Report		Stadium: Somerset Park; Attendance: 2,331; Referee: David Munro

5 May 2023 36	Inverness CT	1–2	Ayr United	Inverness
19:45	Shaw 81'	Report	Mullin 35'; McKenzie 88'	Stadium: Caledonian Stadium; Attendance: 3,435; Referee: Don Robertson

=== Premiership play-offs ===
19 May 2023 Semi-finals 1st Leg	Partick Thistle	3–0	Ayr United	Glasgow
19:45	McMillan 16'; Graham 50', 72'	Report		Stadium: Firhill Stadium; Attendance: 7,012; Referee: Greg Aitken

26 May 2023 Semi-finals 2nd Leg	Ayr United	0–5 (0–8 agg.)	Partick Thistle	Ayr
19:45	Akinyemi (red card) 25'	Report	McMillan 7'; Tiffoney 27', 54'; Lawless 63'; Holt 88'	Stadium: Somerset Park; Attendance: 5,811; Referee: Colin Steven

=== Scottish League Cup ===
==== Group stage ====
Results

9 July 2022 Group stage	Ayr United	3−0	Elgin City	Ayr
15:00		Report		Stadium: Somerset Park; Attendance: 1,194; Referee: David Munro

12 July 2022 Group stage	Ayr United	0−3	Queen of the South	Ayr
19:45		Report	Connelly 8'; Murray 60'; Todd 82'	Stadium: Somerset Park; Attendance: 1,352; Referee: Duncan Williams

19 July 2022 Group stage	Annan Athletic	1−1 (5−4 p)	Ayr United	Annan
19:45	Docherty (red card) 78'; Wallace 90+5' (pen.)	Report	Bryden 71'	Stadium: Galabank; Attendance: 528; Referee: Lloyd Wilson

23 July 2022 Group stage	St Johnstone	1−0	Ayr United	Perth
15:00	Carey 2'	Report		Stadium: McDiarmid Park; Attendance: 2,036; Referee: Gavin Duncan

=== Scottish Challenge Cup ===
22 September 2022 Third round	Greenock Morton	1−1 (5−4 p)	Ayr United	Greenock
19:45	McGregor 12'		Mullin 39'	Stadium: Cappielow; Attendance: 988; Referee: Craig Napier

=== Scottish Cup ===
28 November 2022 Third round	Ayr United	1−0	Pollok	Ayr
19:45	Dempsey 51'	Report		Stadium: Somerset Park; Attendance: 2,425; Referee: Don Robertson

31 January 2023 Fourth round	Cove Rangers	0−3	Ayr United	Aberdeen
19:45		Report	McKenzie 23'; Akinyemi 68'; Ashford 77'	Stadium: Balmoral Stadium; Attendance: 433; Referee: Steven Kirkland

11 February 2023 Fifth round	Ayr United	4−1	Elgin City	Ayr
15:00	Bryden 90'; Dempsey 94' (pen.); Akinyemi 103', 106'	Report	Hester 41'	Stadium: Somerset Park; Attendance: 1,819; Referee: John Beaton

13 March 2023 Quarter-final	Falkirk	2−1	Ayr United	Falkirk
19:45	Morrison 66' (pen.); Kennedy 83'	Report	Akinyemi 12'	Stadium: Falkirk Stadium; Attendance: 6,375; Referee: Nick Walsh

== Squad statistics ==
=== Appearances ===
As of 26 May 2023

No.	Pos	Nat	Player	Total		Championship		League Cup		Challenge Cup		Scottish Cup	
No.	Pos	Nat	Player	Apps	Goals	Apps	Goals	Apps	Goals	Apps	Goals	Apps	Goals
1	GK	(Scotland) SCO	Aidan McAdams	7	0	0+0	0	2+0	0	1+0	0	4+0	0
2	DF	(Scotland) SCO	Jordan Houston	25	1	10+7	1	3+0	0	1+0	0	4+0	0
3	DF	(Scotland) SCO	Patrick Reading	46	0	36+2	0	3+0	0	1+0	0	3+1	0
4	DF	(Zambia) ZAM	Frankie Musonda	30	1	24+1	1	4+0	0	0+0	0	1+0	0
5	DF	(Republic of Ireland) IRL	Sean McGinty	43	3	30+5	3	3+0	0	1+0	0	4+0	0
6	MF	(Scotland) SCO	Andy Murdoch	34	2	26+2	2	4+0	0	0+1	0	0+1	0
8	MF	(England) ENG	Ben Dempsey	46	9	37+0	7	3+1	0	1+0	0	4+0	2
9	FW	(England) ENG	Dipo Akinyemi	46	24	37+0	20	4+0	0	0+1	0	4+0	4
10	MF	(Republic of Ireland) IRL	Daire O'Connor	32	1	14+12	1	2+2	0	0+0	0	1+1	0
11	MF	(England) ENG	Jayden Mitchell-Lawson	36	2	9+21	2	2+1	0	0+0	0	2+1	0
14	MF	(Scotland) SCO	Josh Mullin	26	9	22+2	8	0+0	0	1+0	1	1+0	0
15	DF	(England) ENG	Alex Kirk	24	2	19+1	2	2+0	0	0+0	0	2+0	0
17	DF	(Scotland) SCO	Nick McAllister	33	1	25+2	1	2+0	0	1+0	0	2+1	0
18	MF	(Scotland) SCO	Reece McAlear	17	0	12+3	0	0+0	0	0+0	0	2+0	0
20	MF	(Scotland) SCO	Michael Hewitt	17	0	8+4	0	1+3	0	0+0	0	0+1	0
21	GK	(England) ENG	Charlie Albinson	40	0	38+0	0	2+0	0	0+0	0	0+0	0
22	FW	(Scotland) SCO	Mark McKenzie	43	5	15+20	4	1+2	0	0+1	0	2+2	1
23	FW	(England) ENG	Sam Ashford	42	3	21+13	2	3+0	0	1+0	0	2+2	1
24	MF	(Scotland) SCO	Scott Tomlinson	1	0	0+0	0	0+0	0	0+0	0	0+1	0
26	DF	(Scotland) SCO	Kinlay Bilham	2	0	0+0	0	0+0	0	0+1	0	0+1	0
27	FW	(Scotland) SCO	Max Guthrie	0	0	0+0	0	0+0	0	0+0	0	0+0	0
30	FW	(Scotland) SCO	Fraser Bryden	20	3	3+10	1	0+3	1	0+0	0	0+4	1
31	MF	(Scotland) SCO	Paul Smith	24	0	6+12	0	2+1	0	1+0	0	1+1	0
32	MF	(Scotland) SCO	Dylan Watret	2	0	0+1	0	0+0	0	0+0	0	0+1	0
33	MF	(Scotland) SCO	Carter Jenkins	0	0	0+0	0	0+0	0	0+0	0	0+0	0
77	FW	(Scotland) SCO	Chris Maguire	15	0	7+7	0	0+0	0	0+0	0	1+0	0
Players who left the club during the 2022–23 season
7	FW	(Scotland) SCO	Michael Moffat	0	0	0+0	0	0+0	0	0+0	0	0+0	0
16	MF	(Scotland) SCO	Logan Chalmers	12	2	8+3	2	0+0	0	0+0	0	1+0	0
18	FW	(England) ENG	Brad Young	13	2	7+4	2	0+0	0	1+0	0	1+0	0
19	GK	(England) ENG	Tom Carter	0	0	0+0	0	0+0	0	0+0	0	0+0	0
25	DF	(Scotland) SCO	Finn Ecrepont	9	0	2+4	0	1+1	0	0+1	0	0+0	0
28	DF	(Scotland) SCO	Alex Jeanes	0	0	0+0	0	0+0	0	0+0	0	0+0	0
29	MF	(Democratic Republic of the Congo) COD	David Bangala	9	0	1+5	0	0+0	0	1+0	0	2+0	0
34	FW	(Scotland) SCO	Dario Viviani	0	0	0+0	0	0+0	0	0+0	0	0+0	0

== Team statistics ==
=== League table ===
Pos	Team	Pld	W	D	L	GF	GA	GD	Pts	Promotion, qualification or relegation
1	Dundee (C, P)	36	17	12	7	66	40	+26	63	Promotion to the Premiership
2	Ayr United	36	16	10	10	61	43	+18	58	Qualification for the Premiership play-off semi-final
3	Queen's Park	36	17	7	12	63	52	+11	58	Qualification for the Premiership play-off quarter-final
4	Partick Thistle	36	16	9	11	65	45	+20	57	Qualification for the Premiership play-off quarter-final
5	Greenock Morton	36	15	12	9	53	43	+10	57	

Rules for classification: 1) Points; 2) Goal difference; 3) Goals scored; 4) Head-to-to head points; 5) Head-to-head goal difference; 6) Play-off (only for deciding promotion, play-off participation and relegation).
(C) Champions; (P) Promoted

=== League Cup table ===
Pos	Team	Pld	W	PW	PL	L	GF	GA	GD	Pts	Qualification	ANN	QOS	STJ	AYR	ELG
1	Annan Athletic	4	2	2	0	0	8	3	+5	10	Qualification for the second round	—	—	—	p1–1	4–0
2	Queen of the South	4	2	1	0	1	9	5	+4	8	Qualification for the second round	2–3	—	p2–2	—	—
3	St Johnstone	4	2	0	2	0	7	4	+3	8		0–0p	—	—	1–0	—
4	Ayr United	4	1	0	1	2	4	5	−1	4		—	0–3	—	—	3–0 (Note: Ayr United were awarded a technical 3−0 win over Elgin City, who fielded an ineligible player. The match had originally finished 0–0, with Ayr United securing the bonus point following a 4–3 win on penalties.)
5	Elgin City	4	0	0	0	4	2	13	−11	0		—	0–2	2–4	—	—

Rules for classification: 1) goal difference, 2) goals scored, 3) away goals scored, 4) matches won, 5) away matches won, 6) drawing of lots.

== Transfers ==
=== Transfers in ===
Date	Position	Name	From	Fee	Ref.
16 May 2022	MF	(England) Ben Dempsey	(England) Charlton Athletic	Undisclosed	
3 June 2022	FW	(England) Dipo Akinyemi	(England) Welling United	Free transfer	
10 June 2022	MF	(Democratic Republic of the Congo) David Bangala	(Slovakia) Pohronie	Free transfer	
22 June 2022	DF	(Zambia) Frankie Musonda	Raith Rovers	Free transfer	
28 June 2022	MF	(England) Jayden Mitchell-Lawson	(England) Swindon Town	Free transfer	
31 January 2023	MF	Josh Mullin	Livingston	Free transfer	
20 February 2023	FW	Chris Maguire	Free Agent	Free transfer	

=== Transfers out ===
Date	Position	Name	To	Fee	Ref.
6 May 2022	DF	(England) Ryan Gondoh	(England) Sevenoaks Town	Free transfer	
6 May 2022	DF	(Norway) Markus Fjørtoft	Retired		
6 May 2022	MF	(England) Alex Kenyon	(England) Chester	Free transfer	
6 May 2022	MF	Michael Miller	Stenhousemuir	Free transfer	
16 May 2022	DF	Aaron Muirhead	Partick Thistle	Free transfer	
1 July 2022	DF	Jack Baird	Greenock Morton	Free transfer	
15 July 2022	FW	(England) Tomi Adeloye	(England) Swindon Town	Free transfer	

=== Loans in ===
Date	Position	Name	From	End date	Ref.
7 July 2022	DF	(England) Alex Kirk	(England) Arsenal	31 May 2023	
19 August 2022	GK	Jack McConnell	Rangers	26 August 2022	
31 August 2022	MF	Josh Mullin	Livingston	31 January 2023	
1 September 2022	FW	(England) Brad Young	(England) Aston Villa	31 May 2023	
3 September 2022	GK	(England) Tom Carter	Hibernian	10 September 2022	
30 September 2022	MF	Logan Chalmers	Dundee United	14 January 2023	
31 January 2023	MF	Reece McAlear	(England) Tranmere Rovers	31 May 2023	

=== Loans out ===
Date	Position	Name	To	End date	Ref.
30 September 2022	DF	Michael Hewitt	Peterhead	1 January 2023	
26 January 2023	DF	Finn Ecrepont	Stranraer	31 May 2023	
31 January 2023	FW	Michael Moffat	Glenafton Athletic	31 May 2023	
1 February 2023	MF	(Democratic Republic of the Congo) David Bangala	Cove Rangers	31 May 2023	

Notes

1. A: Ayr United had originally drawn 0 – 0 with Elgin City, however it was later revealed that Elgin had fielded an ineligible player during the match and were subsequently charged by the SPFL with Ayr awarded a 3 – 0 victory.
