= Finn Ecrepont =

Scottish footballer

Personal information
- Date of birth: 30 July 2002 (age 24)
- Place of birth: Scotland
- Position: Left-back

Team information
- Current team: Stranraer
- Number: 3

Youth career
- 2011–2018: Ayr United

Senior career*
Years	Team	Apps	(Gls)
2018–2024	Ayr United	8	(0)
2020–2021	→ Albion Rovers (loan)	17	(0)
2023	→ Stranraer (loan)	13	(1)
2024–	Stranraer	74	(4)

International career^{‡}
2017–2018	Scotland U16	9	(1)
2018–2019	Scotland U17	9	(0)
- * Club domestic league appearances and goals as of 4 May 2026 ‡ National team caps and goals as of 18:37, 19 October 2019 (UTC)

Finn Ecrepont (born 30 July 2002) is a Scottish professional footballer who plays as a left-back for Scottish League Two club Stranraer. He spent his youth and early years at Ayr United, and also played on loan for Albion Rovers and Stranraer.

== Early life ==
Ecrepont was born in Scotland in 2002. He attended Alloway Primary School and had plans to play as a left back.

== Club career ==
=== Ayr United ===
Ecrepont joined Ayr United at the age of 9, moving through the under-17, under-20 and under-21 teams. On 1 July 2018, he signed a senior three-year contract. As well as playing for Ayr's youth teams he said that he often does a few shifts at a cafe which his dad Eddy runs. At first, Ecrepont struggled to find a school that would accept him because of his footballing duties as he was training four mornings a week after signing a new contract but Ayr Academy let him in.

Ecrepont made his debut, coming off the bench against Dundee United in the Scottish Championship on 30 November 2018.

On 26 January 2023, Ecrepont joined Scottish League Two club Stranraer on loan until the end of the season.

In January 2024, Ecrepont would return to Stranraer on a permanent basis.

== International career ==
On 25 July 2017, aged 14, Ecrepont made his Scotland under-16 debut in a 7–0 thrashing of Qatar. He went on to gain 9 caps and scored one goal at that level.

On 19 August 2018, Ecrepont made his debut for the under-17s in a 1–0 win over Russia.

== Personal life ==
His younger brother Ollie is also a footballer, who plays as a goalkeeper and was also in the Ayr United squad in 2023 – they were the first siblings to be contracted to the club at the same time.

== Career statistics ==
=== Club ===
As of match played 24 January 2026

Appearances and goals by club, season and competition
Club	Season	League			Scottish Cup		League cup		Other		Total	
Club	Season	Division	Apps	Goals	Apps	Goals	Apps	Goals	Apps	Goals	Apps	Goals
Ayr United	2018–19	Scottish Championship	1	0	0	0	0	0	0	0	1	0
Ayr United	2019–20	Scottish Championship	0	0	0	0	0	0	1 (Note: Appearance(s) in Scottish Challenge Cup)	0	1	0
Ayr United	2020–21	Scottish Championship	0	0	0	0	0	0	—		0	0
Ayr United	2021–22	Scottish Championship	1	0	0	0	2	0	1	0	4	0
Ayr United	2022–23	Scottish Championship	6	0	0	0	2	0	1	0	9	0
Ayr United	2023–24	Scottish Championship	3	0	0	0	2	0	1	0	6	0
Ayr United	Total		11	0	0	0	6	0	4	0	21	0
Albion Rovers (loan)	2020–21	Scottish League Two	17	0	0	0	2	0	—		19	0
Stranraer (loan)	2022–23	Scottish League Two	13	1	—		—		—		13	1
Stranraer	2023–24	Scottish League Two	16	1	—		—		2 (Note: Appearance(s) in Scottish Pyramid play-offs)	0	18	1
Stranraer	2024–25	Scottish League Two	31	0	2	0	3	0	2	0	38	0
Stranraer	2025–26	Scottish League Two	16	3	3	0	2	0	5	0	26	3
Stranraer	Total		63	4	5	0	5	0	9	0	82	4
Career total			104	5	5	0	13	0	13	0	135	5
