= 2021–22 Ayr United F.C. season =

Ayr United
2021–22 season
- Chairman: David Smith
- Manager: David Hopkin (until 9 September); Jim Duffy (from 1 October–19 December); Lee Bullen (from 7 January)
- Stadium: Somerset Park
- Scottish Championship: 8th
- Scottish League Cup: Second round
- Scottish Challenge Cup: Second round
- Scottish Cup: Fourth round
- Top goalscorer: League: Tomi Adeloye (11); All: Tomi Adeloye (14)
- Highest home attendance: 6,136 vs. Kilmarnock, Championship, 11 March 2022
- Lowest home attendance: 472 vs. Raith Rovers, Championship, 26 December 2021
- Average home league attendance: 1,574
Home colours	Away colours

The 2021–22 season was Ayr United's fourth consecutive season in the Scottish Championship after being promoted from league one in the 2017–18 season. Ayr also competed in the, League Cup, Challenge Cup and the Scottish Cup.

== Summary ==
=== Season ===
Ayr United began the season under the management of David Hopkin who had been in charge since March of the previous season. Hopkin would step down from his position on 9 September following a poor start to the season. He was replaced by his assistant Jim Duffy before he was also relieved of his duties by the club after just one win in eleven games. On 7 January 2022, Ayr United confirmed the appointment of Lee Bullen as their new manager.

== Results and fixtures ==
Win Draw Loss Postponed

=== Pre-season ===
25 June 2021	Ayr United	1–0	The New Saints	Townhead Park, Cumnock
15:00	Baird 33'	Report

29 June 2021	Stranraer	0–2	Ayr United	Stair Park, Stranraer
19:30			Trialist 19'; Trialist 80'

2 July 2021	Heart of Midlothian	1–1	Ayr United	National Sports Training Centre, Largs
15:00	Boyce 76'		Moffat 75'

=== Scottish Championship ===
2 August 2021 1	Kilmarnock	2–0	Ayr United	Kilmarnock
19:45	Polworth 56'; Cameron 86' (pen.)	Report		Stadium: Rugby Park; Attendance: 3,692; Referee: Don Robertson

7 August 2021 2	Ayr United	2–2	Arbroath	Ayr
15:00	Adeloye 70'; McKenzie 87'	Report	Nouble 10'; McKenna 28'	Stadium: Somerset Park; Attendance: 1,244; Referee: Colin Steven

21 August 2021 3	Inverness CT	1–0	Ayr United	Inverness
15:00	McGinty 54' (o.g.)	Report		Stadium: Caledonian Stadium; Attendance: 2,032; Referee: Kevin Clancy

7 September 2021 4	Ayr United	0–2	Raith Rovers	Ayr
15:00	Muirhead (red card) 70'; Afolabi (red card) 75'	Report	Varian 14'; Zanatta 25'; Riley-Snow (red card) 79'	Stadium: Somerset Park; Attendance: 1,204; Referee: Chris Graham

11 September 2021 5	Ayr United	3–1	Dunfermline Athletic	Ayr
15:00	Adeloye 3', 63'; Salkeld 25'	Report	Todorov 28'	Stadium: Somerset Park; Attendance: 1,553; Referee: Barry Cook

18 September 2021 6	Hamilton Academical	0–2	Ayr United	Hamilton
15:00		Report	Bradley 64'; Adeloye 78'	Stadium: New Douglas Park; Attendance: 1,365; Referee: Andrew Dallas

25 September 2021 7	Ayr United	0–0	Greenock Morton	Ayr
15:00		Report		Stadium: Somerset Park; Attendance: 1,638; Referee: Mike Roncone

2 October 2021 8	Partick Thistle	4–0	Ayr United	Glasgow
15:00	Rudden 34', 72'; Smith 45'; Graham 85'	Report		Stadium: Firhill Stadium; Attendance: 2,667; Referee: Duncan Williams

16 October 2021 9	Ayr United	2–1	Queen of the South	Ayr
15:00	Muirhead 73' (pen.); Maxwell 79'	Report	Connelly 68'	Stadium: Somerset Park; Attendance: 1,663; Referee: David Dickinson

23 October 2021 10	Arbroath	1–1	Ayr United	Arbroath
15:00	McKenna 56'	Report	Afolabi 80'	Stadium: Gayfield Park; Attendance: 1,415; Referee: John Beaton

26 October 2021 11	Ayr United	0–1	Kilmarnock	Ayr
19:45		Report	Shaw 89' (pen.)	Stadium: Somerset Park; Attendance: 6,052; Referee: Nick Walsh

30 October 2021 12	Raith Rovers	2–1	Ayr United	Kirkcaldy
15:00	Ross 12'; Zanatta 27'	Report	Baird 71'	Stadium: Stark's Park; Attendance: 1,602; Referee: Greg Aitken

6 November 2021 13	Ayr United	2–2	Inverness CT	Ayr
15:00	Chalmers 15'; Reading 53'	Report	Welsh 13'; Gardyne 26'	Stadium: Somerset Park; Attendance: 1,289; Referee: Steven McLean

13 November 2021 14	Ayr United	0–4	Partick Thistle	Ayr
15:00		Report	Docherty 30'; Graham 33', 81'; Gordon 90+2'	Stadium: Somerset Park; Attendance: 2,037; Referee: Gavin Duncan

20 November 2021 15	Dunfermline Athletic	3–0	Ayr United	Dunfermline
15:00	McCann 14', 52'; Dow 40'	Report		Stadium: East End Park; Attendance: 3,503; Referee: Alan Newlands

4 December 2021 16	Greenock Morton	2–2	Ayr United	Greenock
15:00	Ugwu 26', 84'	Report	Bradley 73'; Adeloye 77'	Stadium: Cappielow; Attendance: 1,335; Referee: Matthew MacDermid

10 December 2021 17	Ayr United	1–1	Hamilton Academical	Ayr
19:45	Adeloye 48'	Report	Smith 40'	Stadium: Somerset Park; Attendance: 951; Referee: Craig Napier

18 December 2021 19	Queen of the South	3–0	Ayr United	Dumfries
15:00	East 9'; Cameron 29'; Todd 48'	Report		Stadium: Palmerston Park; Attendance: 997; Referee: David Munro

26 December 2021 20	Ayr United	2–0	Raith Rovers	Ayr
15:00	Adeloye 22'; McKenzie 76'	Report		Stadium: Somerset Park; Attendance: 472; Referee: David Dickinson

8 January 2022 21	Ayr United	1–0	Arbroath	Ayr
15:00	Maxwell 18'	Report		Stadium: Somerset Park; Attendance: 500; Referee: David Munro

15 January 2022 22	Ayr United	0–2	Greenock Morton	Ayr
15:00		Report	Reilly 27', 61'	Stadium: Somerset Park; Attendance: 500; Referee: John Beaton

29 January 2022 23	Hamilton Academical	1–1	Ayr United	Hamilton
15:00	Kennedy 7'	Report	Ashford 66'	Stadium: New Douglas Park; Referee: John Beaton

1 February 2022 18	Partick Thistle	1–0	Ayr United	Glasgow
19:45	Graham 51'	Report		Stadium: Firhill Stadium; Attendance: 2,207; Referee: Greg Aitken

5 February 2022 24	Ayr United	1–1	Dunfermline Athletic	Ayr
15:00	Martin 17' (o.g.)	Report	Donaldson 10'	Stadium: Somerset Park; Attendance: 1,611; Referee: Alan Muir

9 February 2022 25	Kilmarnock	1–2	Ayr United	Kilmarnock
19:45	Murray 7'	Report	Maxwell 14'; Reading 80'	Stadium: Rugby Park; Attendance: 7,560; Referee: Bobby Madden

19 February 2022 26	Inverness CT	1–2	Ayr United	Inverness
15:00	Carson (red card) 68'; Nicolson 86'	Report	McGinty 35'; Adeloye 64'	Stadium: Caledonian Stadium; Attendance: 1,850; Referee: Kevin Clancy

26 February 2022 27	Ayr United	0–1	Queen of the South	Ayr
15:00		Report	Fitzpatrick 32'	Stadium: Somerset Park; Attendance: 1,875; Referee: Steven McLean

5 March 2022 28	Raith Rovers	0–4	Ayr United	Kirkcaldy
15:00		Report	Adeloye 3'; Maxwell 32', 38'; Ashford 65'	Stadium: Stark's Park; Attendance: 1,513; Referee: Don Robertson

11 March 2022 29	Ayr United	1–3	Kilmarnock	Ayr
19:45	Fjørtoft (red card) 30'; McInroy 38'	Report	McKenzie 3'; Shaw 12'; Sanders 16'	Stadium: Somerset Park; Attendance: 6,136; Referee: Alan Muir

19 March 2022 30	Arbroath	1–0	Ayr United	Arbroath
15:00	Hamilton 50'	Report		Stadium: Gayfield Park; Attendance: 1,727; Referee: Steven McLean

26 March 2022 31	Greenock Morton	1–1	Ayr United	Greenock
15:00	Blues 38'	Report	Adeloye 79'	Stadium: Cappielow; Attendance: 1,815; Referee: Mike Roncone

1 April 2022 32	Ayr United	1–1	Hamilton Academical	Ayr
19:45	McInroy 90+4'	Report	Winter 6'	Stadium: Somerset Park; Attendance: 1,618; Referee: Chris Graham

9 April 2022 33	Ayr United	2–2	Inverness CT	Ayr
15:00	Bryden 54'; Fjørtoft 76'	Report	Sutherland 6'; Chalmers 13'	Stadium: Somerset Park; Attendance: 1,756; Referee: William Collum

16 April 2022 34	Dunfermline Athletic	2–1	Ayr United	Dunfermline
15:00	Cole 79'; Todorov 86'	Report	Muirhead 35' (pen.)	Stadium: East End Park; Attendance: 4,855; Referee: Colin Steven

23 April 2022 35	Queen of the South	1–1	Ayr United	Dumfries
15:00	East 80'	Report	East 87' (o.g.)	Stadium: Palmerston Park; Attendance: 2,271; Referee: William Collum

29 April 2022 36	Ayr United	3–1	Partick Thistle	Somerset Park
19:45	Muirhead 5' (pen.), 61' (pen.); Adeloye 30'	Report	Jakubiak 81'	Attendance: 3,426; Referee: Bobby Madden

=== Scottish League Cup ===
==== Group stage ====
Results

10 July 2021 Group stage	Albion Rovers	0–0 (4–2 p)	Ayr United	Coatbridge
15:00		Report		Stadium: Cliftonhill; Attendance: 150; Referee: Grant Irvine

13 July 2021 Group stage	Ayr United	3–0	Edinburgh City	Ayr
19:45	Adeloye 37', 49'; Murdoch 84'	Report		Stadium: Somerset Park; Attendance: 439; Referee: Lloyd Wilson

20 July 2021 Group stage	Hamilton Academical	0–1	Ayr United	Hamilton
18:00		Report	Salkeld 27'	Stadium: New Douglas Park; Attendance: 801; Referee: Bobby Madden

24 July 2021 Group stage	Ayr United	3–0	Falkirk	Ayr
15:00				Stadium: Somerset Park

==== Knockout stage ====
14 August 2021 Second round	Ayr United	0–0 (3–4 p)	Dundee United	Ayr
15:00		Report		Stadium: Somerset Park; Attendance: 2,196; Referee: Nick Walsh

=== Scottish Challenge Cup ===
14 September 2021 Second round	Rangers B	3–0	Ayr United	Dumbarton
19:30		Report	O'Connor 40'; Chalmers 74'; Fjørtoft 78'	Stadium: Dumbarton Football Stadium; Referee: Steven Reid

Notes

1. A: Ayr United had originally beaten Rangers B 3 – 0, however it was later revealed that Ayr had fielded 2 ineligible players during the game and were subsequently charged by the SPFL with Rangers B awarded a 3 – 0, victory.

=== Scottish Cup ===
27 November 2021 Third round	Ayr United	2–1	Albion Rovers	Ayr
15:00	Maxwell 54'; Moffat 65'	Report	Wright 46'	Stadium: Somerset Park; Attendance: 986; Referee: William Collum

22 January 2022 Fourth round	Ayr United	0–2	St Mirren	Ayr
15:00		Report	McAllister 7'; Kiltie 24'	Stadium: Somerset Park; Attendance: 3,423; Referee: David Dickinson

== Squad statistics ==
=== Appearances ===
As of 29 April 2022

No.	Pos	Nat	Player	Total		Championship		League Cup		Challenge Cup		Scottish Cup	
No.	Pos	Nat	Player	Apps	Goals	Apps	Goals	Apps	Goals	Apps	Goals	Apps	Goals
1	GK	(Scotland) SCO	Aidan McAdams	32	0	27+0	0	2+0	0	1+0	0	2+0	0
2	DF	(Scotland) SCO	Jordan Houston	33	0	26+0	0	4+0	0	1+0	0	2+0	0
3	DF	(Scotland) SCO	Patrick Reading	41	2	35+0	2	4+0	0	0+0	0	2+0	0
4	DF	(Scotland) SCO	Aaron Muirhead	35	4	27+1	4	4+0	0	1+0	0	2+0	0
5	DF	(Republic of Ireland) IRL	Sean McGinty	35	1	28+0	1	3+1	0	1+0	0	2+0	0
6	MF	(Scotland) SCO	Andy Murdoch	39	1	32+0	0	4+0	1	1+0	0	2+0	0
7	FW	(Scotland) SCO	Michael Moffat	21	1	4+14	0	0+0	0	1+0	0	2+0	1
8	MF	(Scotland) SCO	Kerr McInroy	14	2	13+1	2	0+0	0	0+0	0	0+0	0
9	FW	(England) ENG	Tomi Adeloye	38	14	24+8	11	4+0	3	0+1	0	0+1	0
10	MF	(Republic of Ireland) IRL	Daire O'Connor	27	1	13+11	0	0+0	0	1+0	1	1+1	0
11	MF	(England) ENG	Alex Kenyon	3	0	3+0	0	0+0	0	0+0	0	0+0	0
12	DF	(England) ENG	Blaine Rowe	3	0	0+3	0	0+0	0	0+0	0	0+0	0
14	DF	(Scotland) SCO	James Maxwell	37	6	29+5	5	1+0	0	0+0	0	2+0	1
15	DF	(Scotland) SCO	Jack Baird	33	1	24+3	1	4+0	0	0+0	0	2+0	0
16	MF	(England) ENG	Ryan Gondoh	7	0	1+5	0	0+0	0	0+0	0	1+0	0
17	DF	(Scotland) SCO	Nick McAllister	13	0	11+1	0	0+1	0	0+0	0	0+0	0
18	MF	(England) ENG	Ben Dempsey	7	0	6+1	0	0+0	0	0+0	0	0+0	0
19	FW	(England) ENG	Sam Ashford	12	1	12+0	1	0+0	0	0+0	0	0+0	0
20	DF	(Scotland) SCO	Michael Hewitt	7	0	2+2	0	3+0	0	0+0	0	0+0	0
21	GK	(England) ENG	Charlie Albinson	11	0	9+0	0	2+0	0	0+0	0	0+0	0
22	FW	(Scotland) SCO	Mark McKenzie	34	2	20+8	2	4+0	0	1+0	0	1+0	0
23	DF	(Norway) NOR	Markus Fjørtoft	23	2	14+6	1	1+1	0	1+0	1	0+0	0
24	MF	(Scotland) SCO	Scott Tomlinson	0	0	0+0	0	0+0	0	0+0	0	0+0	0
25	DF	(Scotland) SCO	Finn Ecrepont	4	0	0+1	0	0+2	0	1+0	0	0+0	0
26	DF	(Scotland) SCO	Kinlay Bilham	1	0	0+0	0	0+0	0	0+1	0	0+0	0
27	FW	(Scotland) SCO	Max Guthrie	0	0	0+0	0	0+0	0	0+0	0	0+0	0
28	DF	(Scotland) SCO	Alex Jeanes	1	0	0+0	0	0+0	0	0+1	0	0+0	0
30	FW	(Scotland) SCO	Fraser Bryden	12	1	3+8	1	0+0	0	0+0	0	0+1	0
31	MF	(Scotland) SCO	Paul Smith	6	0	1+4	0	0+1	0	0+0	0	0+0	0
32	MF	(Scotland) SCO	Dylan Watret	0	0	0+0	0	0+0	0	0+0	0	0+0	0
33	MF	(Scotland) SCO	Carter Jenkins	0	0	0+0	0	0+0	0	0+0	0	0+0	0
34	FW	(Scotland) SCO	Dario Viviani	0	0	0+0	0	0+0	0	0+0	0	0+0	0
Players who left the club during the 2021–22 season
8	MF	(Scotland) SCO	Michael Miller	4	0	0+0	0	1+3	0	0+0	0	0+0	0
11	MF	(England) ENG	Cameron Salkeld	21	2	8+7	1	3+1	1	0+1	0	0+1	0
16	MF	(Scotland) SCO	Steven Bradley	15	2	6+7	2	0+0	0	0+1	0	0+1	0
18	MF	(Scotland) SCO	Joe Chalmers	19	2	13+3	1	0+2	0	1+0	1	0+0	0
24	FW	(Republic of Ireland) IRL	Jonathan Afolabi	16	1	5+9	1	0+1	0	0+0	0	1+0	0

== Team statistics ==
=== League table ===
Pos	Team	Pld	W	D	L	GF	GA	GD	Pts	Promotion, qualification or relegation
6	Hamilton Academical	36	10	12	14	38	53	−15	42	
7	Greenock Morton	36	9	13	14	36	47	−11	40	
8	Ayr United	36	9	12	15	39	52	−13	39	
9	Dunfermline Athletic (R)	36	7	14	15	36	53	−17	35	Qualification for the Championship play-offs
10	Queen of the South (R)	36	8	9	19	36	54	−18	33	Relegation to League One

Rules for classification: 1) Points; 2) Goal difference; 3) Goals scored; 4) Head-to-to head points; 5) Head-to-head goal difference; 6) Play-off (only for deciding promotion, play-off participation and relegation).
(R) Relegated

=== League Cup table ===
Pos	Team	Pld	W	PW	PL	L	GF	GA	GD	Pts	Qualification	AYR	HAM	ALB	EDI	FAL
1	Ayr United	4	3	0	1	0	7	0	+7	10	Qualification for the second round	—	—	—	3–0	3–0 (Note: Ayr United were awarded a technical 3−0 win over Falkirk, who were unable to raise a team after a COVID-19 outbreak among players and staff.)
2	Hamilton Academical	4	2	1	0	1	5	4	+1	8		0–1	—	p2–2	—	—
3	Albion Rovers	4	0	2	1	1	4	8	−4	5		p0–0	—	—	p1–1	—
4	Edinburgh City	4	1	0	1	2	4	5	−1	4		—	0–1	—	—	3–0 (Note: Edinburgh City were awarded a technical 3−0 win over Falkirk, who were unable to raise a team after a COVID-19 outbreak among players and staff.)
5	Falkirk	4	1	0	0	3	6	9	−3	3		—	1–2	5–1	—	—

Rules for classification: 1) goal difference, 2) goals scored, 3) away goals scored, 4) matches won, 5) away matches won, 6) drawing of lots.

== Transfers ==
=== Transfers in ===
Date	Position	Name	From	Fee	Ref.
25 May 2021	MF	(England) Cameron Salkeld	Greenock Morton	Free transfer	
27 May 2021	DF	(Norway) Markus Fjørtoft	Greenock Morton	Free transfer	
27 May 2021	DF	(Republic of Ireland) Sean McGinty	Greenock Morton	Free transfer	
27 May 2021	DF	Nick McAllister	St Mirren	Free transfer	
21 June 2021	GK	Aidan McAdams	Greenock Morton	Free transfer	
1 July 2021	FW	(England) Tomi Adeloye	(England) Barnet	Free transfer	
8 July 2021	GK	(England) Charlie Albinson	(England) Warrington Town	Free transfer	
28 July 2021	MF	(Republic of Ireland) Daire O'Connor	(Northern Ireland) Cliftonville	Free transfer	
12 January 2022	MF	(England) Ryan Gondoh	(England) Wealdstone	Free transfer	
29 January 2022	MF	(England) Sam Ashford	(England) Crawley Town	Free transfer	
7 March 2022	MF	(England) Alex Kenyon	(England) Scunthorpe United	Free transfer	

=== Transfers out ===
Date	Position	Name	To	Fee	Ref.
7 May 2021	MF	Liam Miller	Free Agent	Free transfer	
7 May 2021	DF	Sam Roscoe	(Northern Ireland) Linfield	Free transfer	
7 May 2021	FW	(England) Andre Wright	(Republic of Ireland) Sligo Rovers	Free transfer	
7 May 2021	MF	(Canada) Dario Zanatta	Raith Rovers	Free transfer	
1 June 2021	MF	Luke McCowan	Dundee	Free transfer	
24 January 2022	MF	Joe Chalmers	Dunfermline Athletic	Undisclosed	

=== Loans in ===
Date	Position	Name	From	End date	Ref.
27 July 2021	DF	James Maxwell	Rangers	31 May 2022	
2 August 2021	FW	(Republic of Ireland) Jonathan Afolabi	Celtic	11 February 2022	
6 September 2021	MF	Steven Bradley	Hibernian	3 January 2022	
24 January 2022	MF	(England) Ben Dempsey	(England) Charlton Athletic	31 May 2022	
31 January 2022	MF	Kerr McInroy	Celtic	31 May 2022	
31 January 2022	DF	(England) Blaine Rowe	(England) Coventry City	31 May 2022	

=== Loans out ===
Date	Position	Name	To	End date	Ref.
31 August 2021	FW	Paul Smith	Cumnock Juniors	31 May 2022	
3 September 2021	DF	Michael Miller	Stenhousemuir	31 May 2022	
28 January 2022	DF	Nick McAllister	Clyde	31 May 2022	

Notes

1. A: Ayr United were awarded a technical 3−0 win over Falkirk, who were unable to raise a team after a COVID-19 outbreak among players and staff.
