= Roy Syla =

Association footballer (born 2000)

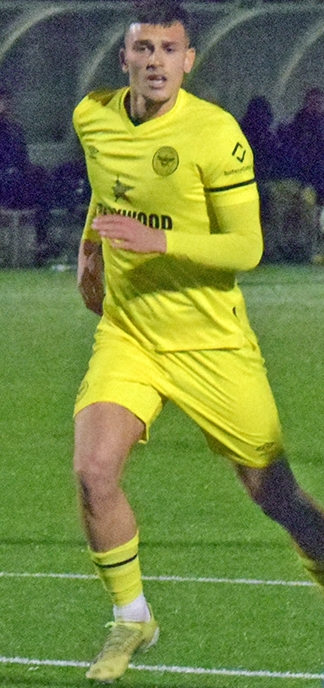
- Syla playing for Brentford B in 2022

Personal information
- Full name: Roy Syla
- Date of birth: 20 June 2000 (age 26)
- Place of birth: London, England
- Height: 1.83 m (6 ft 0 in)
- Position: Defensive midfielder

Team information
- Current team: Woking
- Number: 8

Youth career
- –2018: Barnet

Senior career*
Years	Team	Apps	(Gls)
2018–2020	Barnet	0	(0)
2018–2019	→ Kings Langley (loan)	17	(0)
2019	→ Hampton & Richmond Borough (loan)	5	(0)
2021–2022	Brentford	0	(0)
2022–2023	Brentford	0	(0)
2023–2025	Ayr United	33	(1)
2025	Bylis	2	(0)
2026–	Woking	26	(2)

International career
2016	Albania U17	1	(0)
2018	Albania U19	4	(0)
2019	Albania U20	1	(0)
2022	Albania U21	3	(0)
- * Club domestic league appearances and goals as of 20:14, 22 November 2026 (UTC)

Roy Syla (born 20 June 2000) is a professional footballer who plays as a defensive midfielder for National League club Woking.

Syla is a product of the Barnet academy, but he failed to break into the first team squad prior to his release in 2020. Following more than a year as a free agent, he transferred to Brentford in 2021. After two seasons of exclusively B team football, Syla's senior career began in earnest with Ayr United in 2023. He transferred to Albanian club Bylis in 2025. In 2026, Syla transferred to Woking. Born in England, Syla was capped by Albania at youth level.

== Club career ==
=== Barnet ===
A defensive midfielder, Syla began his career with Barnet at the age of 12 and he progressed through the club's academy to sign a professional contract in March 2018. He spent a large portion of the 2018–19 season away on loan at fellow non-League clubs Kings Langley and Hampton & Richmond Borough and remained at The Hive for 2019–20. Syla was released at the end of the COVID-19-affected 2019–20 season. He made two senior appearances for Barnet, both in Middlesex Senior Cup matches.

=== Brentford ===
On 23 October 2021, Syla joined the B team at Premier League club Brentford on a one-year contract, with the option of a further year, on a free transfer. He had spent periods of the 2020–21 and 2021–22 seasons on trial with the team and was a part of the 2021–22 London Senior Cup-winning squad. Late in the 2021–22 season, he participated in a first team training session. Following 26 appearances for the B team during the 2021–22 season, Syla was released when his contract expired.

Syla was re-signed as a free agent on 20 October 2022 and signed a one-year contract, with a one-year option. Despite being a B team player, but by virtue of being overage, Syla was named in Brentford's 25-man Premier League squad for the second half of the 2022–23 season. He was released at the end of the 2022–23 season.

=== Ayr United ===
On 29 August 2023, Syla signed a two-year contract with Scottish Championship club Ayr United on a free transfer. He made 28 appearances and scored two goals during a mid-table 2023–24 season. Syla appeared sparingly during the first half of the 2024–25 season and his contract was terminated by mutual consent on 16 January 2025. He made 40 appearances and scored two goals during 17 months at Somerset Park.

=== KF Bylis ===
After a trial with Boavista, Syla began making appearances for Albanian Kategoria Superiore club Bylis in March 2025. He made two substitute appearances during the remainder of the 2024–25 season.

=== Woking ===
In late 2025, Syla began training with National League club Woking. On 12 January 2026, he signed a contract running until the end of the 2025–26 season. Syla made 11 appearances prior to suffering a season-ending ankle injury in mid-March 2026. He signed a one-year contract extension in May 2026.

== International career ==
Syla was capped by Albania at U17, U19, U20 and U21 level. He was a member of the U17 team's 2016 Kazakhstan President Cup squad and captained the U19 team to the final of the 2018 Roma Caput Mundi International Tournament.

== Personal life ==
Syla was born in London to Albanian parents.

== Career statistics ==
As of match played 21 November 2026

Appearances and goals by club, season and competition
Club	Season	League			National cup (Note: Includes FA Cup, Scottish Cup)		League cup (Note: Includes Scottish League Cup, National League Cup)		Other		Total	
Club	Season	Division	Apps	Goals	Apps	Goals	Apps	Goals	Apps	Goals	Apps	Goals
Barnet	2018–19	National League	0	0	0	0	―		1 (Note: Appearance in Middlesex Senior Cup)	0	1	0
Barnet	2019–20	National League	0	0	0	0	―		1	0	1	0
Barnet	Total		0	0	0	0	―		2	0	2	0
Kings Langley (loan)	2018–19	Southern League Premier Division South	17	0	2	0	―		1 (Note: Appearance(s) in FA Trophy)	0	20	0
Hampton & Richmond Borough (loan)	2018–19	National League South	5	0	―		―		1 (Note: Appearance in Middlesex Senior Charity Cup)	0	6	0
Ayr United	2023–24	Scottish Championship	24	1	3	1	―		1 (Note: Appearance in Scottish Challenge Cup)	0	28	2
Ayr United	2024–25	Scottish Championship	9	0	0	0	2	0	1	0	12	0
Ayr United	Total		33	1	3	1	2	0	2	0	40	2
Bylis	2024–25	Kategoria Superiore	2	0	―		―		―		2	0
Woking	2025–26	National League	9	0	―		―		2	0	11	0
Woking	2026–27	National League	17	2	1	0	4	0	0	0	22	2
Woking	Total		26	2	1	0	4	0	2	0	33	2
Career total			83	4	6	1	6	0	8	0	103	4

== Honours ==
Brentford B

- London Senior Cup: 2021–22
- Premier League Cup: 2022–23
