= Ben Dempsey =

English footballer

Personal information
- Full name: Ben Michael Dempsey
- Date of birth: 25 November 1999 (age 26)
- Place of birth: Tooting, England
- Position: Midfielder

Team information
- Current team: Partick Thistle
- Number: 6

Youth career
- 2008–2018: Charlton Athletic

Senior career*
Years	Team	Apps	(Gls)
2018–2022	Charlton Athletic	4	(0)
2018–2019	→ Kingstonian (loan)	4	(0)
2019	→ Dulwich Hamlet (loan)	4	(0)
2020	→ Woking (loan)	5	(0)
2020–2021	→ Woking (loan)	26	(0)
2022	→ Ayr United (loan)	7	(0)
2022-2026	Ayr United	127	(17)
2026–	Partick Thistle	13	(0)
- * Club domestic league appearances and goals as of 18:32, 21 November 2026 (UTC)

Ben Michael Dempsey (born 25 November 1999) is an English professional footballer who plays for Scottish Championship club Partick Thistle.

== Career ==
=== Charlton Athletic ===
Having signed his first professional contract with Charlton Athletic in May 2018, Dempsey made his debut for Charlton on 14 August 2018, playing the full 90 minutes in a 3–0 EFL Trophy defeat to Milton Keynes Dons.

==== Loans ====
Dempsey joined Kingstonian on loan in December 2019 before joining Dulwich Hamlet on a one-month loan on 8 November 2019, making his debut for Dulwich on that day in a 4–1 FA Cup defeat to Carlisle United.

He then joined Woking on loan in February 2020 for the rest of the 2019-20 season. On 12 October 2020, Dempsey returned to Woking for a second loan spell, this time running until 9 January 2021. On 13 January 2021, the loan was extended until the end of the 2020-21 season.

On 24 January 2022, Dempsey joined Scottish Championship side Ayr United on loan for the rest of the 2021–22 season, with an option for a permanent deal in the summer.

=== Ayr United ===
On 16 May 2022, it was announced that Dempsey would join Ayr United on a permanent deal for an undisclosed fee.

=== Partick Thistle ===
In June 2026 Dempsey signed with fellow Scottish Championship club Partick Thistle on a two year deal.

== Career statistics ==
As of match played 1 May 2026

Appearances and goals by club, season and competition
Club	Season	League			National Cup (Note: Includes FA Cup & Scottish FA Cup)		League Cup (Note: Includes EFL Cup & Scottish League Cup)		Other		Total	
Club	Season	Division	Apps	Goals	Apps	Goals	Apps	Goals	Apps	Goals	Apps	Goals
Charlton Athletic	2018–19	League One	0	0	0	0	1	0	1 (Note: Appearances in the EFL Trophy)	0	2	0
Charlton Athletic	2019–20	Championship	4	0	–		0	0	–		4	0
Charlton Athletic	2020–21	League One	0	0	–		0	0	1	0	1	0
Charlton Athletic	2021–22	League One	0	0	0	0	0	0	4	0	4	0
Charlton Athletic	Total		4	0	0	0	1	0	6	0	11	0
Kingstonian (loan)	2018–19	Isthmian League Premier Division	4	0	–		–		–		4	0
Dulwich Hamlet (loan)	2019–20	National League South	4	0	1	0	–		2 (Note: Appearances in the FA Trophy)	0	7	0
Woking (loan)	2019–20	National League	5	0	–		–		1 (Note: Appearance in the Surrey Senior Cup)	0	6	0
Woking (loan)	2020–21	National League	26	0	2	0	–		4	0	32	0
Woking (loan)	Total		31	0	2	0	–		5	0	38	0
Ayr United (loan)	2021–22	Scottish Championship	7	0	–		–		–		7	0
Ayr United	2022–23	Scottish Championship	35	7	4	2	4	0	3 (Note: One appearance in the Scottish Challenge Cup; Two appearances in the Scottish Premiership play-offs)	0	46	9
Ayr United	2023–24	Scottish Championship	22	3	3	0	4	0	0	0	29	3
Ayr United	2024–25	Scottish Championship	34	4	2	0	3	0	5 (Note: Three appearances in the Scottish Challenge Cup; Two appearances in the Scottish Premiership play-offs)	0	44	4
Ayr United	2025–26	Scottish Championship	29	3	2	0	0	0	2 (Note: Appearances in the Scottish Challenge Cup)	1	33	4
Ayr United	Total		127	17	11	2	11	0	10	1	159	20
Career total			170	17	14	2	12	0	23	1	219	20
