= Barry Hepburn =

Scottish footballer

Personal information
- Date of birth: 7 March 2004 (age 22)
- Place of birth: Bannockburn, Scotland
- Height: 1.77 m (5 ft 10 in)
- Positions: Winger; wide midfielder

Team information
- Current team: Stirling Albion
- Number: 7

Youth career
- –2020: Celtic
- 2020–2023: Bayern Munich

Senior career*
Years	Team	Apps	(Gls)
2022–2024	Bayern Munich II	4	(0)
2023	→ Queen's Park (loan)	14	(2)
2024	→ DSV Leoben (loan)	10	(0)
2026	Manningham United	0	(0)
2026–	Stirling Albion	6	(0)

International career
2018–2019	Scotland U16	3	(0)
2019–2020	Scotland U17	3	(0)
2022	Scotland U19	6	(0)
- * Club domestic league appearances and goals as of 14 November 2026

Barry Hepburn (born 7 March 2004) is a Scottish professional footballer who plays as a winger and wide midfielder for Scottish League Two club Stirling Albion. He has represented Scotland at youth level internationally.

== Club career ==
=== Early career ===
As a youth player, Hepburn joined the youth academy of Scottish Premiership club Celtic.

=== Bayern Munich ===
On 2020, he moved to Germany and joined the youth academy of Bundesliga club Bayern Munich. He finished the 2022–23 Regionalliga season with four appearances. Hepburn left Bayern Munich after his contract expired following the 2023–24 season.

==== Loan to Queen's Park ====
On 23 June 2023, Hepburn signed a contract with Bayern Munich II until 2025 and was loaned to Scottish Championship club Queen's Park for the 2023–24 season. He made his debut for Queen's Park against East Fife on 15 July 2023 in the League Cup.

==== Loan to DSV Leoben ====
On 18 January 2024, after his loan was cut short he was instead loaned to Austrian 2. Liga club DSV Leoben for the rest of the season.

=== Manningham United ===
On 9 February 2026, Barry Hepburn signed for Australian third division side Manningham United, playing in the Victorian Premier League, ahead of the 2026 season.

=== Stirling Albion ===
On 1 July 2026, Hepburn signed with Scottish League Two side Stirling Albion ahead of the 2026–27 season.

== International career ==
Hepburn is a youth international for Scotland, having played for the Scotland U16s, U17s, and U19s.

== Career statistics ==
As of match played 9 December 2023

Appearances and goals by club, season and competition
Club	Season	League			National Cup		League Cup		Other		Total	
Club	Season	Division	Apps	Goals	Apps	Goals	Apps	Goals	Apps	Goals	Apps	Goals
Bayern Munich II	2022–23	Regionalliga Bayern	4	0	—		—		—		4	0
Queen's Park (loan)	2023–24	Scottish Championship	13	2	1	0	4	0	2 (Note: Appearances in the Scottish Challenge Cup)	1	20	3
Career Total			17	2	1	0	4	0	2	1	24	3
