= Stirling Albion F.C. =

Scottish football club

Stirling Albion
- Full name: Stirling Albion Football Club
- Nickname: The Binos
- Founded: 1945
- Ground: Forthbank Stadium, Stirling
- Capacity: 3,808 (2,508 seated)
- Coordinates: 56.119081°N 3.91186°W
- Owner: Stirling Albion Supporters Trust
- Chairman: Fraser McIntyre
- Manager: Steven Whittaker
- League: Scottish League Two
- 2025–26: Scottish League Two, 8th of 10
- Website: www.stirlingalbionfc.co.uk
Home colours	Away colours

Stirling Albion Football Club is a Scottish football club based in the city of Stirling. The club was founded in 1945 following the demise of King's Park after World War II. The club currently competes in Scottish League Two as a member of the Scottish Professional Football League. Its highest league position came in 1958–59 with a 12th-placed position in the top flight. Its only major success is in the league where it has won the second tier of Scottish football on four occasions, the last coming in 1964–65. The club has more recently competed in the third or fourth tier following league re-construction in 1975 and 1994.

Stirling's home ground is Forthbank Stadium, a 3,808 capacity stadium in the east of the city near the banks of the River Forth. Before the stadium was opened in 1993, the club was based at Annfield Stadium which had been the home of the club since it was founded in 1945.

== History ==
=== Origins ===
Stirling Albion was founded in 1945 after the town's previous football team King's Park had failed to survive the Second World War. King's Park's ground (Forthbank) had been damaged during the war, having been hit by a German bomb on 20 July 1940. This was one of only two bombs to fall on the town during the Second World War.

The new club was the brainchild of local businessman Thomas Fergusson, a local coal magnate, and he purchased the Annfield estate to build a new stadium. Annfield was situated within a quarter of a mile from the town centre and would be the home of The Binos until 1992.

The name 'Albion' supposedly came from the make of Fergusson's coal trucks. This however is an urban myth. Albion Coal lorries were used as grandstands but the club was named at a meeting of fans long before a ball was kicked. (Reference, Stirling Journal Newspaper, 1945.) The name Albion was chosen because it was an old word for Great Britain and held meaning for the founder.

=== The yo-yo years ===
Between 1946 and 1968, the club gained a reputation as a club that was too good for the lower league but never quite good enough to establish themselves in the top flight, being relegated and promoted several times, hence the club's nickname of The Yo-Yos. For a time it was a saying in Scotland that something or somebody was "going up and down like Stirling Albion". In 1966 the club became the first British team to play in Japan.

=== The 1970–1980s ===
Under the vastly experienced Bob Shankly, Stirling made progress, achieving consecutive third place finishes in 1971–72 and 1972–73, narrowly missing out on promotion to the top tier.

On retiring to the boardroom, Shankly was succeeded for one season by Frank Beattie but then handpicked his long-term protege, former Albion player Alex Smith, who had been cutting his managerial teeth at Stenhousemuir. Smith's first season in 1974–75 saw the club finish 8th, three points behind Alex Ferguson's St Mirren in 6th. That slim margin would prove crucial as league reconstruction meant it was the difference between staying in the Second Division or starting afresh in the new third tier.

Over the next two seasons, Smith began a major rebuild of the playing staff that would create one of Albion's finest squads. To a core of long-standing regulars including midfielder Robert Duffin, half-back James Clark and goalkeeper George Young, he added, among others, centre-half John Kennedy from Partick Thistle, Clyde full-back James Burns and Hibernian youngsters Allan Moffat and David Steedman. Midfielder Robin Thomson and teenage winger Graeme Armstrong also arrived from non-league football.

Albion opened the 1976–77 season with a League Cup campaign that saw them nearly topple Premier Division Aberdeen in the quarter-finals, losing the first leg 1–0 at Pittodrie but then winning the return by the same score at Annfield with a Robert Gray header. The Dons won the replay at the neutral ground of Dens Park, Dundee, 2–0, before beating both Rangers and Celtic on the way to lifting the trophy. Albion went on to win the Second Division crown that season, conceding only 29 goals in 39 matches and taking the title with several games to spare.

Back in the second tier, Albion finished a creditable 5th in 1977–78 and enjoyed comfortable mid-table finishes in the subsequent two seasons. However, despite consolidation on the pitch, Annfield's infrastructure was in dire need of repair and the club's cash supplies began to run low.

The 1980–81 season started memorably with a stunning 1–0 win over Celtic in the first leg of their second round League Cup tie thanks to a Lloyd Irvine goal. They took an early lead in the 2nd leg at Parkhead too with a Matt McPhee free kick, but minutes away from a famous victory, a late Tommy Burns strike took the tie to extra time. Albion were eventually overwhelmed and lost 6–2 on aggregate, a teenage Charlie Nicholas coming off the bench to grab his first two goals for the Hoops.

Following a third match against Celtic – a 3–0 defeat in the Scottish Cup in February – goals and confidence dried up and 13 games without finding the net led to relegation back to the 3rd tier. Through necessity, Albion began to cash in on the squad's better players, and Smith was given the task of developing a conveyor belt of local talent to sell on and keep Albion afloat.

George Young had already signed for Rangers for £20,000 in 1979 but the exodus began to pick up pace. Defender George Nicol went to Dundee United in 1981 and John Kennedy to St Johnstone a year later.

Three of Smith's local discoveries left in quick succession in 1983 and 1984: striker John Colquhoun to Celtic, midfielder Brian Grant to Aberdeen and Scotland youth defender John Philliben to Doncaster Rovers. Meanwhile, stalwart goalkeeper Gordon Arthur departed for Dumbarton. Despite the calibre of the players leaving, Albion maintained consistent top-half finishes and, in 1984, racked up a record 20–0 Scottish Cup victory over Selkirk, which made headlines around the world.

Following a bright start to the 1986–87 campaign, Smith was prised away to take charge of St Mirren, and his assistant George Peebles took over at Annfield. Albion finished third and missed out on promotion only on goal difference.

Three more local players were poached from the club between 1986 and 1987: Willie Irvine by Hibernian and Robert Dawson and Keith Walker by their old boss at St Mirren, bringing the total revenue raised from player sales linked to the Smith era to nearly £1 million.

However, off the field, the council had decided to make as much money as possible from Annfield, and the grass pitch was considered not to be cost effective. The main stand was also demolished after being declared an unsafe building. An extra large crowd turned up in September 1987, to see Stirling play Ayr United on the first-ever game on artificial turf in Scotland.

One consequence of the pitch change was that clubs could decide not to play on the surface in cup matches, and so for the next five years all of Stirling Albion's home cup games were played away. With the supposed advantage of the artificial pitch not working, St Johnstone defeated the Binos by six goals on the artificial surface, Peebles was relieved of his duties and Jim Fleeting was appointed.

Fleeting was manager for six months but shook the club up and served as a launch pad for the next 10 years. When Fleeting left to manage Kilmarnock days after declaring his "loyalty to Stirling Albion, a sincere loyalty I'm proud to say", Bino's star striker John Brogan was promoted to manager and would finally lead the Binos out of Division Two in 1991. The club went unbeaten away from home for a whole calendar year, and easily saw off the challenge of Montrose to clinch the title at Links Park on 7 April 1991.

=== The 1990s: between Divisions 1 and 2 ===
The next three years in Division 1 were eventful. The club stayed up, but Annfield was no more and a new ground was built outside Stirling town centre on the banks of the River Forth. After many years playing at Annfield in the centre of the town, the team now play at Forthbank Stadium which is owned by Stirling Council.

The club was relegated to Division 2 when the structure of Scottish Football was changed again to create a four division setup. Brogan was sacked and replaced by Kevin Drinkell. Drinkell had a terrible first season in charge: by February the club were third from bottom, and after a defeat at Brechin City the fans revolted against Drinkell. Sensing he was in the last chance saloon, he quickly brought in Paul Deas and Garry Paterson who shored up the team and took them on a 10-game unbeaten run. This run lifted the club into second on the last day of the season, when a point would have secured them an immediate return to Division 1. The Binos hosted Dumbarton at Forthbank but Dumbarton won, and the Binos were resigned to another season in the second division. However, in the 1995–96 season the club went on an amazing run and had the league sewn up by Christmas, and were regularly scoring six goals in their games.

During 1996 to 1998 the club returned to the First Division. The 1996–97 season saw a respectable mid-table finish. The 1997–98 season began with good early cup form, but the club were relegated after the introduction of foreign players failed to compensate for the loss of several key players. With one game remaining, Drinkell was replaced by his assistant, former West Ham United and Scotland star Ray Stewart.

Between 1998 and 2000 the club played in the 2nd Division under the management of John Philliben. Philliben was criticised as manager after the signings he made throughout his reign. He was sacked at the end of the 1999–00 season and replaced by Ray Stewart, who returned to manage the Binos for a second time.

=== Recent years ===
The 2000–01 season saw Stirling Albion go on a run of 17 games without a win, and finished at the bottom of the Second Division and were subsequently relegated to the Third Division. The following season was equally poor as The Binos finished second bottom of the Third Division, avoiding the bottom place by the narrowest of margins – a single missed penalty. Their Scottish Cup campaign was similarly weak, with the team being knocked out by East of Scotland League team Gala Fairydean. Ray Stewart was sacked at the end of the season.

Allan Moore was appointed manager at the beginning of the 2002–03 season, and the club saw immediate improvement in its fortunes. The Binos were promoted to the Second Division at the end of the 2003–04 season, and the following season saw a respectable fourth-place finish in the league. This improvement continued into season 2005–6. Major changes to the promotion/relegation issues had been put into place, with the advent of the play-off system, but Stirling just missed out in competing in the play-offs. The following seasons the Binos went on an 18-game unbeaten run. This successful run saw the club climb to 2nd place in the Second Division, where they would finish the season, guaranteeing them a play-off place for promotion to the Scottish First Division.

Stirling Albion went into the play-offs after a run of four defeats against Stranraer, Brechin City, Ayr United and Peterhead. The Binos played Raith Rovers in the playoffs semifinals. The first game was at Starks Park, where the game finished with a goal less draw. In the second game of the tie the Binos defeated Raith Rovers at Forthbank with Chris Aitken scoring two goals and Colin Cramb scoring a third, to secure a play-off final tie with Airdrie United. In the first game of the play-off final the Binos had to come from 2 goals behind at half time, to go into the second game all square at 2 each. On Saturday 12 May 2007 the Binos travelled to Airdrie to play the final game of the season and play for promotion to Scottish Division One. The game was played in front of a shared support of 3,465 people. Stirling Albion secured the win with Robert Snodgrass two goals and Stewart Devine scoring the third goal to gain the Binos promotion from the Scottish Second Division to the Scottish First Division.

It had taken the Binos nearly ten years to return to the Scottish First Division, after dropping down to ninth in the Scottish Third Division. Slowly over the past five seasons Binos boss Allan Moore took the side from the lowest ebb in the club's recent history to gaining promotion to the Scottish First Division. However the team entered the First Division as the sole part-time team in that league and failed to sustain their position, finishing in the automatic relegation spot.

In May 2009 various groups of Stirling Albion supporters, concerned about the future ownership and viability of the club, came together in a campaign to buy the club, inspiring car stickers and postering campaign to that end.

Due to the forced relegation of Livingston, the second division for 2009–10 contained three teams from the previous years Third Division. In addition, newly relegated Clyde were forced to build a squad from scratch and were thus seen as nigh on relegation certainties. This meant the division appeared to be as weak as it had been for many a season. Stirling Albion therefore began the season as one of, if not the, favourites for the title.

A good start from Stirling saw them set the early pace and for a while they appeared to be on their way to pulling well clear of the pack. Unfortunately for the Binos a combination of poor home form and an inability to keep clean sheets saw them fall from the top of the table. The extended cold spell of weather through the early months of 2010 hit Stirling worse than any other team and soon they were as many as four games behind their promotion rivals. Defeat to Alloa in early April appeared to be a fatal blow. Soon Stirling were 15 points behind the league leading Wasps and the title looked gone.

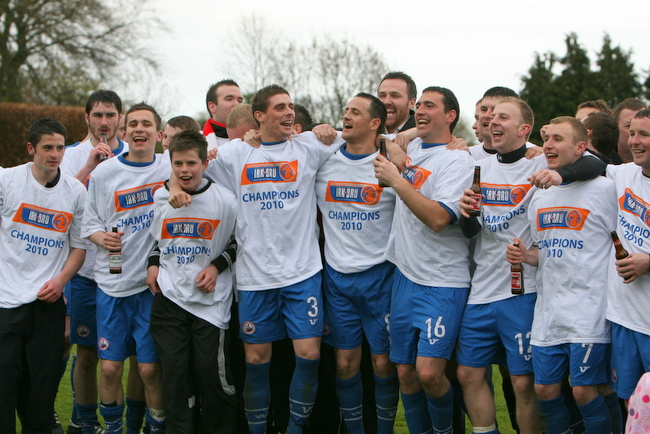

However, when all looked lost things suddenly began to turn. Eight games compressed into the final 21 days of the season saw the team come together and the gap to Alloa was reduced. As the long time leaders began to lose games the Binos consistent run of form saw them regain top spot on the penultimate weekend of the campaign. Stirling then had two chances to win the title. A dramatic 3–3 draw at Cowdenbeath knocked the Fife side out of title contention and meant only a draw was required four days later at Brechin.

An early Michael Mullen goal had Stirling in control but a Charlie King leveller and a red card for on-loan defender Brian Allison saw Stirling hearts skip a beat. However, the 10 men of Stirling held firm and earned the draw which won them their first divisional title for nearly 15-years.

In the aftermath of promotion, Stirling manager Allan Moore finally got his much sought after move into full-time football as he took charge of Greenock Morton. His replacement was John O'Neill, who stepped up from being assistant manager. Club coach Roddy Grant was appointed the new assistant manager.

On 2 July it was announced that chairman Peter McKenzie had agreed to sell his majority shareholding to the Stirling Albion Supporters Trust. Thus the BuyStirlingAlbion campaign which was launched in May 2009 had finally reached a conclusion. Stirling Albion became the first Scottish League club to be 100% owned by a fans trust.

A poor start to season 2010–11 saw John O'Neill and assistant Roddy Grant under pressure. After six straight league defeats, including three by five or more goals, the management team were let go in the wake of 6–1 drubbing at Partick Thistle on 15 January. Former Dundee and Aberdeen manager Jocky Scott replaced John O'Neill in the Stirling hot seat. Jocky was assisted by ex-Hibernian manager John Blackley. Only months after their appointment, the Binos were relegated back to the Second Division on 9 April 2011, with four games to spare. Jocky was able to finally secure his first win as Stirling Albion manager on the final day of the season in a 3–2 victory over Greenock Morton.

In the summer of 2011, the club requested a £200 payment from potential players attending 'So You Think You're Good Enough?' trials with the club, hoping to gain a contract for the 2011–12 season. Twelve of those who attended were invited back to attend pre-season training to aid their attempts to gain a contract. Despite criticism from Players' union representatives, the club announced that a further trial would take place for another 17 players hoping to secure a squad place. Two players who took place in these trials, goalkeeper Sam Filler and defender John Crawley were awarded professional contracts in July 2011.

After seven consecutive defeats between October and December 2011 Jocky Scott and assistant John Blackley left the club by mutual consent. During their period in charge the club won only 5 of 38 competitive fixtures. Defender Greig McDonald was placed in temporary charge, and after ending a losing streak was appointed full-time manager, making him the youngest in the UK at the age of just 29. Despite the appointment, Stirling Albion were relegated to the Third Division on 29 April 2012 following a 2–1 defeat to Dumbarton.

On 6 October 2012, Stirling Albion defeated Rangers while bottom of the Scottish league thanks to a Brian Allison goal. Albion then maintained their unbeaten home record against Rangers that season by earning a well deserved point in a 1–1 draw on 26 February 2013. On 9 March the club recorded a 9–1 home win against East Stirlingshire, with Jordan White scoring four goals.

In May 2014, Stirling Albion were promoted after winning the League One playoff final, beating East Fife 3–2 on aggregate. However, this spell in the higher division lasted a single season, and the club were relegated after finishing bottom in 2015. The club have remained in League Two from 2015 onwards, achieving mostly mid-table positions.

In December 2021, Stirling Albion parted ways with Kevin Rutkiewicz who had managed the club since October 2018.

In December 2021, Stirling Albion appointed Darren Young as the new first team manager.

== Honours ==
League

- Scottish second tier (currently Scottish Championship)
  - Champions (4): 1952–53, 1957–58, 1960–61, 1964–65
  - Runners-up (2): 1948–49, 1950–51
- Scottish third tier (currently Scottish League One)
  - Champions (5): 1946–47, 1976–77, 1990–91, 1995–96, 2009–10
  - Runners-up (1): 2006–07
  - Play-off winners (1): 2006–07
- Scottish fourth tier (currently Scottish League Two)
  - Champions (1): 2022–23
  - Runners-up (1): 2003–04

== Club records ==
- Record victory: 20–0 v Selkirk, Scottish Cup, 8 December 1984
- Record defeat: 0–9 v Dundee United, Division One, 30 December 1967; and 0–9 v Ross County, Scottish Cup, 6 February 2010
- Record attendance at Annfield Stadium: 26,400 v Celtic, Scottish Cup, 11 March 1959
- Record attendance at Forthbank Stadium: 3,808 v Aberdeen, Scottish Cup, 15 February 1996
- Most appearances: Matt McPhee – 556 (1967–1981)
- Top goalscorer: Billy Steele – 129 (1971–1983)

== Squad ==
As of 1 October 2026

Note: Flags indicate national team as defined under FIFA eligibility rules; some limited exceptions apply. Players may hold more than one non-FIFA nationality.

No.	Pos.	Nation	Player
1	GK	SCO	Andrew McNeil
2	DF	SCO	Murray Thomas
4	DF	SCO	Lee Hamilton
5	MF	SCO	Robbie McNab
6	DF	SCO	Kyle Banner
7	MF	SCO	Barry Hepburn
8	MF	SCO	Craig Brown
9	FW	SCO	Russell McLean
10	MF	SCO	Kurtis Roberts (on loan from Alloa Athletic)
11	MF	SCO	Harry Wright
14	MF	SCO	Josh Mullin (captain)
15	FW	SCO	Austin Laird

No.	Pos.	Nation	Player
16	DF	SCO	Sam Denham
17	FW	SCO	Lucas Fyfe (co-operation loan with Dunfermline Athletic)
20	MF	SCO	Robin Raine
22	MF	SCO	Billy Hutchinson (on loan from St Mirren)
23	DF	SCO	Kevin Waugh
24	DF	SCO	Ali Gould
25	MF	SCO	Danny Dobbie (co-operation loan with Dunfermline Athletic)
26	MF	SCO	Zeke Cameron (co-operation loan with Dunfermline Athletic)
29	FW	SCO	Jordan Allan
30	DF	SCO	Callum Crane
31	GK	SCO	Robert Duffy
34	GK	SCO	Curtis Lyle (on loan from Stenhousemuir)

=== On loan ===
Note: Flags indicate national team as defined under FIFA eligibility rules; some limited exceptions apply. Players may hold more than one non-FIFA nationality.

No.	Pos.	Nation	Player
—	DF	SCO	Ally Graham (on loan at Lanark United)
—	DF	SCO	Ross Nelson (on loan at Berwick Rangers)

No.	Pos.	Nation	Player
—	MF	SCO	Scott Boyle (on loan at Pollok)
—	MF	SCO	Kieran Breslin (on loan at Kirkintilloch Rob Roy)

== Club officials ==
=== Coaching staff ===
- Manager: Steven Whittaker
- Assistant coach: Mark McKenna
- First team coach: Josh Mullin
- Goalkeeping coach: David Earl
- Head of youth development: Tony McMinn
- Football operations support: Andy Kennedy
- Physiotherapist: Isobel Robertson
- First team analyst: Rory Crawford
- Sports scientist: Andy Somerville
- Kitman: Ian McIntyre
- Development squad coaching team: Thomas Grant, Stevie Nicholas, Lewis Steele, Derek Ure
