= Daire O'Connor =

Irish professional footballer (born 1997)

Personal information
- Date of birth: 15 April 1997 (age 29)
- Place of birth: Arklow, County Wicklow, Ireland
- Position: Winger

Team information
- Current team: Carrick Rangers

Youth career
- Arklow Town
- Home Farm
- 2014–2016: UCD

Senior career*
Years	Team	Apps	(Gls)
2015–2018	UCD	73	(12)
2019–2020	Cork City	38	(4)
2020–2021	Cliftonville	37	(6)
2021–2023	Ayr United	49	(1)
2023–2024	Glentoran	35	(11)
2024–2025	Hamilton Academical	4	(0)
2025	→ East Kilbride (loan)	6	(0)
2025–2026	Ballymena United	23	(3)
2026–	Carrick Rangers	0	(0)
- * Club domestic league appearances and goals as of 14:56, 3 July 2026 (UTC)

Daire O'Connor is an Irish professional footballer who plays as a winger for NIFL Premiership side Carrick Rangers.

== Club career ==
=== UCD ===
A native of Arklow, County Wicklow, O'Connor began playing football with his local side Arklow Town and Dublin club Home Farm before joining the Under 19 side of UCD in August 2014. He made his first team debut for the club on 7 March 2015, the opening day of the 2015 League of Ireland First Division season, replacing Dylan Watts in the 89th minute of a 3–0 win over Cobh Ramblers at St Colman's Park. In February 2018, he scored a 93rd-minute winner in the final of the Collingwood Cup against QUB. He was part of the side that won the 2018 League of Ireland First Division title, which was confirmed with a 1–1 draw against Finn Harps at the UCD Bowl on 14 September 2018. O'Connor was voted by his fellow League of Ireland First Division players into the PFAI First Division Team of the Year for 2018. He made a total of 86 appearances in all competitions during his 4 seasons at the club, scoring 12 goals. March 2019 saw O'Connor named Colleges and Universities Player of the Year at the FAI International Football Awards for his performances for University College Dublin's Collingwood Cup side.

=== Cork City ===
Deaspite leaving UCD at the end of the season, O'Connor still moved up to the League of Ireland Premier Division signing for Cork City ahead of the 2019 season. He made his Premier Division debut in the opening game of the season away to St Patrick's Athletic as his side lost 1–0 at Richmond Park but he did enough to impress the watching Republic of Ireland manager Mick McCarthy who said 'Daire O'Connor, he was the one player who stood out for me, he played very very well I thought. Whether it was on the right or on the left, he went and played in behind the striker. He was the one that stood out.' On 6 October 2020, it was announced that he had left the club, just 5 games before the end of the season after being told he was surplus to requirements by manager Neale Fenn. In the days the announcement, O'Connor revealed that he was "baffled" at being told he was no longer required at the club following no falling out with his manager, stating "I didn't expect to go in Monday morning to training and not go back again." He scored 5 goals in 47 appearances over his 2 seasons at the club.

=== Cliftonville ===
O'Connor signed for NIFL Premiership side Cliftonville on 21 October 2020 until the end of the season. In March 2021, Cliftonville manager Paddy McLaughlin called O'Connor 'unplayable' and backed him for a big future in the game. He scored 8 goals in 39 games for the club over the season.

=== Ayr United ===
On 28 July 2021, O'Connor signed for Scottish Championship side Ayr United. He made his debut for the club on 2 August 2021 in a 2–0 loss to Kilmarnock at Rugby Park. O'Connor scored his first goal for the club on 14 September 2021, opening the scoring in a 3–0 Scottish Challenge Cup win away to Rangers B. He spent 2 seasons at the club, making a total of 59 appearances in all competitions, scoring twice.

=== Glentoran ===
On 24 June 2023, O'Connor signed for NIFL Premiership club Glentoran. He made his debut for the club on 13 July 2023, scoring his first career European goal in a 2–2 draw away to Gżira United of Malta in a UEFA Europa Conference League tie. O'Connor scored 13 goals in 45 appearances in all competitions during his season with the club, as they came 5th in the league.

=== Hamilton Academical ===
On 23 July 2024, O'Connor signed a two-year-contract with Scottish Championship side Hamilton Academical. After making just 7 appearances in all competitions, the last of those coming in October 2024, he was sent out on loan in March 2025 in search of regular first team football.

==== East Kilbride loan ====
On 10 March 2025, O'Connor joined Lowland Football League side East Kilbride on loan until the end of the season. He made his debut the following day in a 2–1 win away to Linlithgow Rose in the Semi Final of the Lowland League Cup. On 15 March 2025, he scored his first goal for the club, in a 4–2 win over Musselburgh Athletic in the South Challenge Cup. On 30 March 2025, he scored in a 3–1 win over Bo'ness United in the Final of the Lowland League Cup. On 2 April 2025, he was part of the side that won the 2024–25 Lowland Football League after a 2–1 win away to University of Stirling.

=== Ballymena United ===
On 26 June 2025, O'Connor signed for NIFL Premiership club Ballymena United on a multi-year contract for an undisclosed fee.

=== Carrick Rangers ===
O'Connor signed for NIFL Premiership side Carrick Rangers ahead of the 2026–27 season.

== Personal life ==
O'Connor is close friends with fellow professional footballer Liam Scales, with the pair growing up together since the age of 5 and playing together at UCD, with O'Connor also choosing Scales as his best man at his wedding.

== Career statistics ==
As of match played on 31 January 2026

Appearances and goals by club, season and competition
Club	Season	League			National Cup (Note: Includes FAI Cup, Irish Cup & Scottish Cup)		League Cup (Note: Includes League of Ireland Cup, Northern Ireland Football League Cup, Scottish League Cup & Lowland League Cup)		Europe		Other		Total	
Club	Season	Division	Apps	Goals	Apps	Goals	Apps	Goals	Apps	Goals	Apps	Goals	Apps	Goals
UCD	2015	League of Ireland First Division	11	2	0	0	1	0	0 (Note: Appearances in the UEFA Europa League)	0	2 (Note: Appearances in the League of Ireland promotion/relegation play-off)	0	14	2
UCD	2016	League of Ireland First Division	16	2	1	0	1	0	—		2 (Note: Appearances in the Leinster Senior Cup)	0	20	2
UCD	2017	League of Ireland First Division	19	2	0	0	0	0	—		2	0	21	2
UCD	2018	League of Ireland First Division	27	6	3	0	1	0	—		0	0	31	6
UCD	Total		73	12	4	0	3	0	0	0	6	0	86	12
Cork City	2019	League of Ireland Premier Division	29	4	0	0	1	0	1	0	3 (Note: 2 appearances, 1 goal in the Munster Senior Cup & 1 appearance, 0 goals in the President of Ireland's Cup)	1	34	5
Cork City	2020	League of Ireland Premier Division	9	0	2	0	—		—		2 (Note: Appearances in the Munster Senior Cup)	0	13	0
Cork City	Total		38	4	2	0	1	0	1	0	5	1	47	5
Cliftonville	2020–21	NIFL Premiership	37	6	2	2	—		—		0 (Note: Appearances in the County Antrim Shield)	0	39	8
Ayr United	2021–22	Scottish Championship	24	0	2	0	0	0	—		1 (Note: Appearances in the Scottish Challenge Cup)	1	27	1
Ayr United	2022–23	Scottish Championship	25	1	2	0	4	0	—		1 (Note: Appearances in the Scottish Championship play-offs)	0	32	1
Ayr United	Total		49	1	4	0	4	0	—		2	1	59	2
Glentoran	2023–24	NIFL Premiership	35	11	4	1	1	0	2 (Note: Appearances in the UEFA Europa Conference League)	1	3	0	45	13
Hamilton Academical	2024–25	Scottish Championship	4	0	0	0	2	0	—		1	0	7	0
East Kilbride (loan)	2024–25	Lowland Football League	6	0	—		2	1	—		1 (Note: Appearance(s) in the South Challenge Cup)	1	9	2
Ballymena United	2025–26	NIFL Premiership	23	3	0	0	3	1	—		2	0	28	4
Carrick Rangers	2026–27	NIFL Premiership	0	0	0	0	0	0	—		0	0	0	0
Career Total			265	37	16	3	16	2	3	1	20	3	320	46

== Honours ==
=== Club ===
UCD

- League of Ireland First Division: 2018
- Collingwood Cup: 2018

East Kilbride

- Lowland Football League: 2024–25
- Lowland League Cup: 2024–25
- South Challenge Cup: 2024–25

=== Individual ===
- PFAI First Division Team of the Year: 2018
- FAI Colleges and Universities Player of the Year: 2018
