= Sam Ashford =

English footballer

Personal information
- Full name: Samuel Kenneth Ashford
- Date of birth: 21 December 1995 (age 30)
- Place of birth: Chelmsford, England
- Height: 6 ft 1 in (1.85 m)
- Positions: Centre forward; winger

Team information
- Current team: South Shields

Youth career
- Tottenham Hotspur

Senior career*
Years	Team	Apps	(Gls)
2014–2015	Maldon & Tiptree	8	(0)
2015	Heybridge Swifts	7	(0)
2015–2017	Stansted	59	(21)
2017	Witham Town	8	(1)
2017–2018	Brightlingsea Regent	12	(1)
2018	Witham Town	17	(8)
2019	East Thurrock United	10	(2)
2019	Concord Rangers	8	(3)
2019	Witham Town	20	(10)
2019–2020	Hemel Hempstead Town	29	(10)
2020–2022	Crawley Town	20	(1)
2021	→ Woking (loan)	14	(4)
2022–2023	Ayr United	47	(4)
2023–2024	Cliftonville	23	(6)
2024–2025	Wealdstone	28	(7)
2025–2026	Woking	16	(2)
2025	→ AFC Totton (loan)	4	(0)
2026	→ Hampton & Richmond Borough (loan)	6	(0)
2026–	South Shields	1	(0)

International career^{‡}
2018	England C	2	(0)
- * Club domestic league appearances and goals as of 04:30, 17 August 2026 (UTC) ‡ National team caps and goals as of 15:51, 23 June 2020 (UTC)

Samuel Kenneth Ashford (born 21 December 1995) is an English professional footballer who plays as a centre forward or winger for National League North club South Shields.

He played for Tottenham Hotspur's academy before starting his career non-league football with Maldon & Tiptree in 2014. He later played for Heybridge Swifts, Stansted, Witham Town and Brightlingsea Regent before joining National League South side East Thurrock United in 2019. He also played at this level with Concord Rangers and Hemel Hempstead Town before joining EFL League Two club Crawley Town in summer 2020. He had a loan spell at Woking in the National League in 2021 before joining Scottish Championship club Ayr United in January 2022. He is a former England C international.

== Early life ==
Ashford was born in Chelmsford.

== Club career ==
Ashford joined the academy of Tottenham Hotspur at the age of 8 before being released by the club at under-14 level.

After spells with Maldon & Tiptree, Heybridge Swifts and Essex Senior League side Stansted, where he scored 32 goals in 68 appearances, Ashford joined Witham Town in 2017. In November 2017, Ashford joined Brightlingsea Regent, before leaving the club in February 2018, having made only a handful of appearances as a result of injury. He rejoined Witham Town later that year.

In January 2019, Ashford joined National League South side East Thurrock United, before joining fellow National League South side and local rivals Concord Rangers later that year, where he made 8 appearances, scoring 3 goals. While signed to Concord Rangers he returned briefly to Witham Town for the final game of the 2018–19 season, scoring in that game, after Concord failed to make the play-offs. Ashford signed for fellow National League South side Hemel Hempstead Town in the summer of 2019. Ashford scored for Hemel on the opening game of the 2019–20 season in a 4–1 victory over Hungerford Town. He scored 10 goals in 29 league appearances across the 2019–20 season.

Following the expiry of his contract at Hemel Hempstead Town, Ashford joined League Two side Crawley Town in summer 2020 on a two-year contract. On his debut for the club on 5 September, Ashford scored Crawley's only goal of their 3–1 home defeat to Millwall in the EFL Cup. After 14 appearances for Crawley, Ashford joined Woking on loan until the end of the season on 5 March 2021. He scored his first goal for Woking the following day on his debut, heading in the opening goal of a 3–0 win over King's Lynn Town. He scored his first league goal for Crawley in a 2–2 draw with Harrogate Town on 21 September 2021. He scored twice in 15 matches for Crawley during the 2021–22 season.

On 29 January 2022, Ashford signed for Scottish Championship club Ayr United on a free transfer. He signed an 18-month contract with the club. He made his debut later that day as a substitute in a 1–1 draw with Hamilton Academical, and scored Ayr's equaliser 7 minutes after coming on as a substitute.

On 23 August 2023, Ashford signed for NIFL Premiership club Cliftonville. He scored 8 goals in 29 matches in all competitions, including one in the 2023–24 Irish Cup final which Cliftonville would win 3–1, before leaving the club at the end of the season.

On 20 June 2024, Ashford joined National League side Wealdstone on an initial one-year deal.

On 24 March 2025, Ashford returned to fellow National League side, Woking on a permanent basis for an undisclosed fee. On the 27 November 2025, Ashford went out on loan to National League South side AFC Totton to get some match fitness after he had suffered a broken collar bone earlier in the season. On 2 January 2026, he joined Hampton & Richmond Borough on loan for the remainder of the season. On 10 March 2026, Ashford’s loan at Hampton & Richmond Borough was terminated early due to injury problems within the Woking squad. On 7 May 2026, it was announced that Ashford would leave the club at the end of his contract in June.

On 30 June 2026, Ashford joined National League North club South Shields.

== International career ==
He made two appearances for the England C team in 2018.

== Playing style ==
Ashford plays as a centre forward and winger.

== Personal life ==
His father Mark Ashford is manager of non-league club Witham Town; Sam played under Mark at the club.

== Career statistics ==
As of match played 14 April 2026

Appearances and goals by club, season and competition
Club	Season	League			National Cup (Note: Includes FA Cup, Scottish Cup, Irish Cup)		League Cup (Note: Includes EFL Cup, Scottish League Cup, NIFL Cup)		Other		Total	
Club	Season	Division	Apps	Goals	Apps	Goals	Apps	Goals	Apps	Goals	Apps	Goals
Maldon & Tiptree	2014–15	Isthmian League Division One North	8	0	0	0	—		0	0	8	0
Heybridge Swifts	2014–15	Isthmian League Division One North	5	0	0	0	—		0	0	5	0
Heybridge Swifts	2015–16	Isthmian League Division One North	2	0	0	0	—		1 (Note: 1 appearance in Alan Turvey Trophy)	0	3	0
Heybridge Swifts	Total		7	0	0	0	0	0	1	0	8	0
Stansted	2015–16	Essex Senior League	31	8	0	0	—		4	0	35	8
Stansted	2016–17	Essex Senior League	28	13	0	0	—		1	0	29	13
Stansted	Total		59	21	0	0	0	0	5	0	64	21
Witham Town	2017–18	Isthmian League Division One North	8	1	1	1	—		3 (Note: 1 appearance in FA Trophy, 1 appearance in Alan Turvey Trophy, 1 appearance in Essex Senior Cup)	0	12	2
Brightlingsea Regent	2017–18	Isthmian League Premier Division	12	1	0	0	—		0	0	12	1
Witham Town	2018–19	Isthmian League North Division	17	8	1	0	—		3 (Note: 3 appearances and 1 goal in FA Trophy, 1 appearance in Alan Turvey Trophy, 1 appearance and 1 goal in Essex Senior Cup)	3	23	11
East Thurrock United	2018–19	National League South	10	2	0	0	—		0	0	10	2
Concord Rangers	2018–19	National League South	8	3	0	0	—		0	0	8	3
Witham Town	2018–19	Isthmian League North Division	1	1	0	0	—		0	0	1	1
Hemel Hempstead Town	2019–20	National League South	29	10	1	0	—		5 (Note: 1 appearance and 2 goals in the FA Trophy; 4 appearances and 2 goals in the Herts Senior Cup)	4	35	14
Crawley Town	2020–21	League Two	8	0	2	0	1	1	3 (Note: Appearance(s) in EFL Trophy)	0	14	1
Crawley Town	2021–22	League Two	12	1	0	0	1	1	2	0	15	2
Crawley Town	Total		20	1	2	0	2	2	5	0	29	3
Woking (loan)	2020–21	National League	14	4	0	0	—		1 (Note: 1 appearance in FA Trophy)	0	15	4
Ayr United	2021–22	Scottish Championship	13	2	0	0	0	0	0	0	13	2
Ayr United	2022–23	Scottish Championship	32	2	4	1	3	0	3	0	42	3
Ayr United	2023–24	Scottish Championship	2	0	0	0	4	0	0	0	6	0
Ayr United	Total		47	4	4	1	7	0	3	0	61	5
Cliftonville	2023–24	NIFL Premiership	23	6	4	2	1	0	1	0	29	8
Wealdstone	2024–25	National League	28	7	3	0	—		2 (Note: 1 appearance in the National League Cup; 1 appearance in the FA Trophy)	0	33	7
Woking	2024–25	National League	8	0	0	0	—		0	0	8	0
Woking	2025–26	National League	8	2	0	0	—		2 (Note: 2 appearance in National League Cup)	0	10	2
Woking	Total		16	2	0	0	—		2	0	18	2
AFC Totton (loan)	2025–26	National League South	4	0	0	0	—		0	0	4	0
Hampton & Richmond (loan)	2025–26	National League South	6	0	0	0	—		0	0	6	0
Career total			316	71	16	4	10	2	31	7	375	84

== Honours ==
Cliftonville

- Irish Cup: 2023-24
