= Dipo Akinyemi =

English footballer (born 1997)

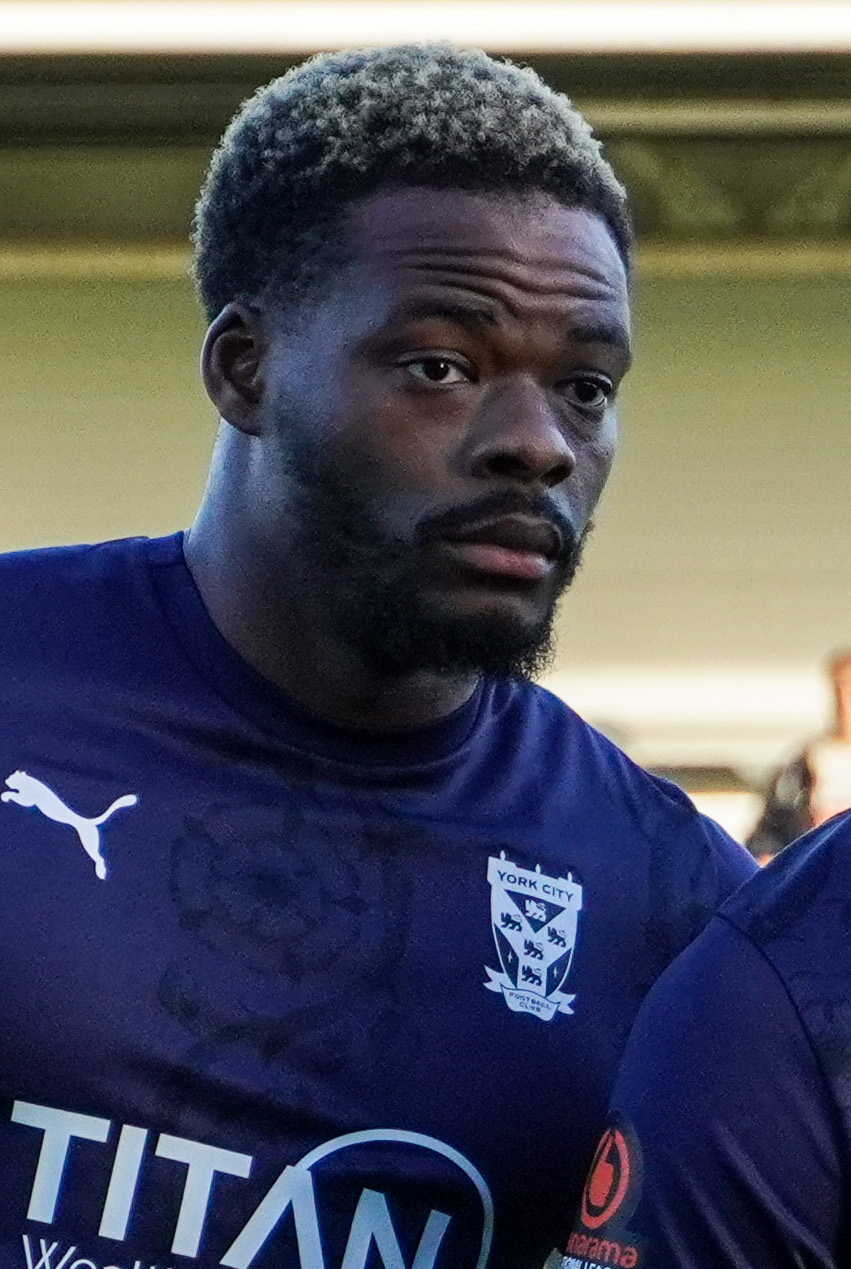
- Akinyemi in 2023

Personal information
- Full name: Afolabi Oladipo Christopher Akinyemi
- Date of birth: 10 June 1997 (age 29)
- Place of birth: Enfield, London, England
- Height: 6 ft 0 in (1.83 m)
- Position: Forward

Team information
- Current team: Eastleigh F.C (loan)
- Number: 9

Youth career
- 2011–2014: Potters Bar Town
- 2014–2015: Stevenage

Senior career*
Years	Team	Apps	(Gls)
2014	Potters Bar Town	7	(1)
2015–2018	Stevenage	15	(1)
2015	→ Aldershot Town (loan)	4	(1)
2016	→ St Neots Town (loan)	6	(1)
2016	→ Dulwich Hamlet (loan)	5	(5)
2016	→ St Albans City (loan)	15	(3)
2016–2017	→ Billericay Town (loan)	7	(1)
2017	→ Dulwich Hamlet (loan)	16	(5)
2017–2018	→ Bishop's Stortford (loan)	29	(8)
2018–2019	Dulwich Hamlet	53	(17)
2019	→ Cheshunt (loan)	10	(5)
2019	Braintree Town	2	(0)
2019–2022	Welling United	62	(28)
2022–2023	Ayr United	36	(20)
2023–2025	York City	65	(19)
2025–2026	Derry City	24	(6)
2026–	York City	1	(0)
2026–	→ Eastleigh F.C (loan)	1	(0)
- * Club domestic league appearances and goals as of 21:53, 26 August 2026 (UTC)

Afolabi Oladipo Christopher "Dipo" Akinyemi (born 10 June 1997) is a professional footballer who plays as a forward for EFL League Two club York City.

Akinyemi began his career in the youth academy at Potters Bar Town in 2011, progressing to the first team in 2014. He joined Stevenage's academy later that year and made his first-team debut at the start of the 2015–16 season. While at Stevenage, Akinyemi spent time on loan at Aldershot Town, St Neots Town, Dulwich Hamlet on two occasions, St Albans City, Billericay Town and Bishop's Stortford. Akinyemi joined Dulwich on a permanent basis in March 2018, and contributed to the club's promotion to the National League South during the remainder of the 2017–18 season.

He had a loan spell at Cheshunt in August 2019, before leaving Dulwich to join Braintree Town in November 2019. A month later, he signed for divisional rivals Welling United, where he spent three seasons. In June 2022, Akinyemi signed for Ayr United of the Scottish Championship, finishing the 2022–23 season as the division's top goalscorer. He subsequently joined York City of the National League for an undisclosed fee in July 2023, scoring 20 goals in 71 appearances over two seasons. He signed for League of Ireland Premier Division club Derry City in July 2025 before returning to York City in June 2026.

== Career ==
=== Potters Bar Town ===
Akinyemi began his career at Potters Bar Town's youth set-up in 2011 after impressing youth manager John Gibbs playing Sunday league football. He was part of the Potters Bar under-18 team that defeated full-time academy teams in consecutive years in the FA Youth Cup. After three years in the youth team, Akinyemi made his first-team debut on 6 September 2014, scoring in a 4–0 away victory against Bedford Town. He made seven league appearances in the Southern League Division One Central over the next two months.

=== Stevenage ===
After gaining first-team experience at Potters Bar, Akinyemi joined the academy of League Two club Stevenage at the end of 2014. He trained with the first team towards the end of the 2014–15 season and was an unused substitute in two league matches in April 2015. Akinyemi signed his first professional contract that summer, and made his senior debut under new manager Teddy Sheringham in the opening match of the 2015–16 season, a 2–0 defeat to Notts County at Broadhall Way. He scored his first goal for the club in his third appearance, finishing off a counterattack in a 2–2 draw away at Newport County on 15 August 2015. Akinyemi made 16 appearances during the season, predominantly in its opening months, and scored once.

==== Loan spells ====
Akinyemi joined National League club Aldershot Town on a one-month loan on 10 November 2015, intended to aid his development through regular first-team football. He scored on his debut the following day in a 2–1 home defeat to Lincoln City. Akinyemi made four appearances during the loan, scoring once, before returning to Stevenage in early December. Limited to two substitute appearances after his return, Akinyemi joined Southern League Premier Division club St Neots Town on 6 February 2016 on a one-month loan, scoring once in six appearances. He subsequently joined Isthmian League Premier Division club Dulwich Hamlet on loan on 25 March 2016, for the remainder of the season. Akinyemi scored on his debut in a 2–2 draw away at Enfield Town on 27 March 2016 and registered five goals in seven matches, as Dulwich missed out on promotion via the play-offs.

Ahead of the 2016–17 season, Akinyemi joined St Albans City of the National League South on loan until January 2017. He scored on his debut in a 2–0 home victory against Concord Rangers at Clarence Park. He was recalled by Stevenage at the end of November 2016, having made 21 appearances in all competitions, 11 of which as a substitute, and scoring five goals. Stevenage confirmed their intention to loan Akinyemi out again, and on 6 December 2016, he joined Isthmian League Premier Division club Billericay Town on a one-month loan. He made seven appearances at Billericay, scoring one goal. In January 2017, Akinyemi rejoined Dulwich Hamlet on loan for the remainder of the season. Akinyemi scored four goals in 14 minutes in Dulwich's 7–1 victory against Barkingside in the London Senior Cup on 21 February 2017. He finished the loan with 10 goals in 19 appearances in all competitions.

Akinyemi joined Southern League Premier Division club Bishop's Stortford on a season-long loan agreement on 26 July 2017. The move reunited him with manager Kevin Watson, formerly assistant manager at Stevenage during Akinyemi's debut season. Akinyemi scored his first goal for the club in a 5–0 away victory against Dunstable Town on 26 September 2017. He registered 10 goals in 36 appearances in all competitions during the 2017–18 season, including four goals in his final four games for the club before being recalled by Stevenage in March 2018.

=== Dulwich Hamlet ===
Upon his recall, Akinyemi signed for Isthmian League Premier Division club Dulwich Hamlet on a permanent basis on 6 March 2018, having previously had two loan spells at the South London club. Stevenage allowed him to depart on a free transfer in exchange for a "significant percentage of any future sale". He made 14 appearances and scored four goals in all competitions as Dulwich secured promotion to the National League South via the play-offs. Akinyemi scored the decisive penalty in the final as Dulwich defeated Hendon 4–3 on penalties following a 1–1 draw after extra-time. He remained a regular during the club's first season at National League South level, scoring 16 goals in 41 appearances.

After making three appearances for Dulwich at the start of the 2019–20 season, Akinyemi joined Isthmian League Premier Division club Cheshunt on a two-month loan on 25 August 2019. He made his debut the following day in the club's 1–1 draw with Corinthian Casuals and scored his first goal in a 2–1 home defeat to Bognor Regis Town on 14 September 2019. Akinyemi scored five times in 10 appearances during the loan spell.

=== Welling United ===
With first-team opportunities limited at Dulwich, Akinyemi joined fellow National League South club Braintree Town on 22 November 2019. After three appearances at Braintree, he moved to another club in the division, Welling United, on 13 December 2019. He scored four goals in 12 appearances during the remainder of the 2019–20 season, which was curtailed due to the COVID-19 pandemic in March 2020. Akinyemi added a further three goals in nine matches during the opening two months of the 2020–21 season, which was also cut short due to ongoing restrictions. Akinyemi scored 18 goals in 38 appearances during the 2021–22 season as Welling avoided relegation on the final day of the season.

=== Ayr United ===
Akinyemi signed a two-year contract with Scottish Championship club Ayr United on 3 June 2022. He scored his first two goals for the club in a 3–2 league victory away at Queen's Park on 5 August 2022, including a 92nd-minute penalty to win the match. The goals served as the catalyst for a run of 14 goals in 16 matches, which included Akinyemi's first career league hat-trick in a 5–0 victory against Queen's Park on 8 October 2022. He finished the 2022–23 season as the league's top goalscorer, scoring 24 goals in 45 appearances and earning the Scottish Championship Player of the Year award.

=== York City ===
Akinyemi signed for National League club York City for a club-record fee on 15 July 2023, undisclosed but reported to be between £250,000 and £340,000. He scored on his debut in a 2–1 defeat to Wealdstone and finished the 2023–24 season as York's leading goalscorer, with 15 goals in 42 appearances in all competitions. His goals were credited with contributing to York's survival, with the club avoiding relegation by one point. In the 2024–25 season, he scored five goals in 29 appearances, with a partial anterior cruciate ligament tear limiting his involvement during the second half of the season.

=== Derry City ===
Akinyemi signed for League of Ireland Premier Division club Derry City on a multi-year contract on 9 July 2025. He scored his first goal for the club on his league debut in a 1–1 draw with Bohemians on 25 July 2025. After scoring three goals in nine appearances, he suffered a thigh injury against Shelbourne on 19 September 2025, which sidelined him for five months. He made 17 appearances during the 2026 season, 11 as a substitute, and scored three goals.

=== York City return ===
Akinyemi returned to York City on 15 June 2026. The length of his contract and whether a transfer fee was paid to Derry City were not disclosed.

== Style of play ==
Deployed as a centre forward throughout his career, Akinyemi's youth manager at Potters Bar Town, John Gibbs, highlighted his work ethic and strength, also commending his attitude and dedication. He has also been described as "pacy and strong" and "a real threat".

== Personal life ==
Born in England, Akinyemi is of Nigerian descent.

== Career statistics ==
As of match played 15 August 2026

Appearances and goals by club, season and competition
Club	Season	League			National cup (Note: Includes FA Cup, FAI Cup, Scottish Cup)		League cup (Note: Includes EFL Cup, League of Ireland Cup, Scottish League Cup)		Other		Total	
Club	Season	Division	Apps	Goals	Apps	Goals	Apps	Goals	Apps	Goals	Apps	Goals
Potters Bar Town	2014–15	Southern League Division One Central	7	1	0	0	—		0	0	7	1
Stevenage	2014–15	League Two	0	0	—		—		—		0	0
Stevenage	2015–16	League Two	15	1	0	0	1	0	0	0	16	1
Stevenage	Total		15	1	0	0	1	0	0	0	16	1
Aldershot Town (loan)	2015–16	National League	4	1	—		—		—		4	1
St Neots Town (loan)	2015–16	Southern League Premier Division	6	1	—		—		—		6	1
Dulwich Hamlet (loan)	2015–16	Isthmian League Premier Division	5	5	—		—		2 (Note: Appearances in 2016 Isthmian League Premier Division play-offs)	0	7	5
St Albans City (loan)	2016–17	National League South	15	3	3	1	—		3 (Note: Two appearances in FA Trophy; one appearance and one goal in Herts Senior Cup)	1	21	5
Billericay Town (loan)	2016–17	Isthmian League Premier Division	7	1	—		—		—		7	1
Dulwich Hamlet (loan)	2016–17	Isthmian League Premier Division	16	5	—		—		3 (Note: Appearances in London Senior Cup)	5	19	10
Bishop's Stortford (loan)	2017–18	Southern League Premier Division	29	8	1	0	—		6 (Note: Two appearances and one goal in FA Trophy; one appearance and one goal in Southern Combination Challenge Cup; two appearances in Herts Charity Cup; one appearance in Herts Senior Cup)	2	36	10
Dulwich Hamlet	2017–18	Isthmian League Premier Division	11	4	0	0	—		3 (Note: Two appearances in Alan Turvey Trophy; one appearance in 2018 Isthmian League Premier Division play-offs)	0	14	4
Dulwich Hamlet	2018–19	National League South	38	13	3	3	—		0	0	41	16
Dulwich Hamlet	2019–20	National League South	4	0	0	0	—		0	0	4	0
Dulwich Hamlet	Total		53	17	3	3	0	0	3	0	59	20
Cheshunt (loan)	2019–20	Isthmian League Premier Division	10	5	—		—		0	0	10	5
Braintree Town	2019–20	National League South	2	0	—		—		1 (Note: Appearance(s) in FA Trophy)	0	3	0
Welling United	2019–20	National League South	12	4	—		—		0	0	12	4
Welling United	2020–21	National League South	13	6	0	0	—		1	0	14	6
Welling United	2021–22	National League South	37	18	1	0	—		0	0	38	18
Welling United	Total		62	28	1	0	0	0	1	0	64	28
Ayr United	2022–23	Scottish Championship	36	20	4	4	4	0	1 (Note: Appearance in Scottish League Challenge Cup)	0	45	24
York City	2023–24	National League	40	15	2	0	—		0	0	42	15
York City	2024–25	National League	25	4	2	1	—		2 (Note: One appearance in FA Trophy; one appearance in 2025 National League play-offs)	0	29	5
York City	Total		65	19	4	1	0	0	2	0	71	20
Derry City	2025	LOI Premier Division	7	3	2	0	—		—		9	3
Derry City	2026	LOI Premier Division	17	3	—		—		0	0	17	3
Derry City	Total		24	6	2	0	—		0	0	26	6
York City	2026–27	League Two	1	0	0	0	1	0	0	0	2	0
Career total			357	121	18	9	6	0	22	8	413	138

== Honours ==
Dulwich Hamlet

- Isthmian League Premier Division play-offs: 2017–18

Individual

- PFA Scotland Players' Player of the Year: 2022–23 Scottish Championship
