= Tomi Adeloye =

English footballer (born 1996)

Personal information
- Full name: Oluwatomisin Akintunde Adeloye
- Date of birth: 17 February 1996 (age 30)
- Place of birth: Sidcup, London, England
- Height: 1.87 m (6 ft 2 in)
- Position: Striker

Team information
- Current team: TransINVEST
- Number: 90

Youth career
- 2008–2013: Charlton Athletic
- 2013–2014: Millwall

Senior career*
Years	Team	Apps	(Gls)
2014–2015	Stoke City	0	(0)
2015	→ Macclesfield Town (loan)	0	(0)
2015	Chelmsford City	5	(2)
2015	Dover Athletic	0	(0)
2015	→ Leatherhead (loan)	9	(4)
2015	Welling United	6	(0)
2016	Leatherhead	13	(3)
2016	FC United of Manchester	8	(1)
2017	Altrincham	4	(0)
2017	Hartlepool United	9	(0)
2018–2019	Dagenham & Redbridge	27	(3)
2019–2020	Ebbsfleet United	22	(3)
2020	East Kilbride	2	(2)
2021	Barnet	17	(3)
2021–2022	Ayr United	32	(11)
2022–2024	Swindon Town	13	(1)
2023–2024	→ Partick Thistle (loan)	21	(8)
2025–2026	Greenock Morton	29	(6)
2026–	TransINVEST	4	(0)
- * Club domestic league appearances and goals as of 09:42, 30 March 2026 (UTC)

Oluwatomisin Akintunde Adeloye (born 17 February 1996) is an English professional footballer who plays as a forward for TOPLYGA club TransINVEST.

== Career ==
=== Early career ===
Adeloye began his career at Charlton Athletic where he enjoyed great success through the youth ranks, he went on to attract interest from Nigeria at youth level. He was then invited to train with Nigeria at U16 level. After departing Charlton Athletic, he moved to the youth team of both Millwall whilst he completed his scholarship. Soon after, he signed his first professional contract with Premier League outfit Stoke City scoring five goals for the U18s side before the close of the 2013–14 campaign. The majority of his moves since were all in the English Fifth tier where he got first-team experience with over 80 appearances to his name in the National League for Dagenham & Redbridge, Ebbsfleet United and Barnet.

Adeloye had a brief spell with East Kilbride in December 2020, scoring a brace as a second-half substitute on his debut in a 9–0 win over Edinburgh University, but made just one further appearance before the Lowland League was suspended and he played out the season with National League side Barnet, scoring three goals in 17 appearances.

=== Ayr United ===
After turning down a two-year deal at Barnet Adeloye moved back to Scotland on 1 July 2021 joining Ayr United on an initial one-year deal. Adeloye would become Ayr's top scorer that season with 14 goals in 38 appearances and would leave the club at the end of the season as a fan favourite.

=== Swindon Town ===
On 15 July 2022, Adeloye signed for Swindon Town on a two-year deal and made his debut in the 3–0 loss at Harrogate Town. Adeloye scored his first goal for Swindon as a substitute in a 2–1 defeat at Newport County. On 2 May 2024, Swindon announced the player would be released in the summer when his contract expired.

==== Partick Thistle (loan) ====
Adeloye returned to Scotland in July 2023 to sign for Scottish Championship club Partick Thistle on a season long loan.

Adeloye scored his first goal for Partick Thistle in a 4–1 away win over Greenock Morton, adding the 4th goal with a curling shot into the top corner.

In March 2024, Adeloye suffered a hamstring injury which required surgery, ruling him out for the remainder of the season after coming off the bench and scoring in a 2–2 draw away to Queens Park.

During his time with Partick Thistle, Adeloye had the best goal to minutes ratio in the league, with an average of 1.55 goals every 90 minutes.

=== Greenock Morton ===
In February 2025, Adeloye signed a short-term deal with Scottish Championship side Greenock Morton. In July 2025, he extended his contract with the club.

He departed the club following the expiration of his short-term contract in January 2026. On 12 March 2026, Adeloye joined TOPLYGA club TransINVEST.

== Style of play ==
Upon joining Ayr United Adeloye was described by manager David Hopkin as "Something different to what we already have. He has real pace and power and leads the line really well".

== Career statistics ==
As of match played 4 February 2023

Appearances and goals by club, season and competition
Club	Season	League			National cup		League cup		Other		Total	
Club	Season	Division	Apps	Goals	Apps	Goals	Apps	Goals	Apps	Goals	Apps	Goals
Hartlepool United	2017–18	National League	9	0	0	0	0	0	0	0	9	0
Dagenham & Redbridge	2018–19	National League	27	3	0	0	0	0	0	0	27	3
Ebbsfleet United	2019–20	National League	22	3	1	0	0	0	1 (Note: Appearances in FA Trophy)	0	24	3
Barnet	2020–21	National League	17	3	0	0	0	0	0	0	17	3
Ayr United	2021–22	Scottish Championship	32	11	1	0	4	3	1 (Note: Appearances in the Scottish Challenge Cup)	0	38	14
Swindon Town	2022–23	League Two	10	1	0	0	1	0	1 (Note: Appearance in Football League Trophy)	0	12	1
Swindon Town	2023–24	League Two	0	0	0	0	0	0	0	0	0	0
Swindon Town	Total		10	1	0	0	1	0	1	0	12	1
Partick Thistle (loan)	2023–24	Scottish Championship	0	0	0	0	0	0	0	0	0	0
Career total			117	21	2	0	5	3	3	0	127	24
