= 2018–19 Ayr United F.C. season =

Ayr United
2018–19 season
- Manager: Ian McCall
- Stadium: Somerset Park
- Scottish Championship: 4th
- Scottish Cup: Fourth round
- League Cup: Quarter-final
- Challenge Cup: First round
- Premiership play-offs: Quarter-final
- Top goalscorer: League: Lawrence Shankland (24); All: Lawrence Shankland (34)
- Highest home attendance: 3,249 v Partick Thistle, Championship, 4 August 2018
- Lowest home attendance: 1,227 v Stenhousemuir, League Cup, 24 July 2018
- Average home league attendance: 2,157
Home colours	Away colours

The 2018–19 season was Ayr United’s 109th season of competitive football and their first season back in the Scottish Championship following their promotion from League One in the 2017–18 season. Ayr also competed in the Scottish Cup, League Cup, and the Challenge Cup.

== Summary ==
=== Season ===
In their first season back in the second–tier of Scottish football, Ayr United finished in fourth place and qualified for the Premiership play-offs, losing to Inverness CT in the quarter-final.

== Results and fixtures ==
Win Draw Loss Postponed

=== Scottish Championship ===
4 August 2018 1	Ayr United	2–0	Partick Thistle	Somerset Park, Ayr
15:00	Shankland 7' (pen.), 18'	Report		Attendance: 3,249; Referee: Craig Thomson

11 August 2018 2	Inverness CT	0–0	Ayr United	Caledonian Stadium, Inverness
15:00		Report	Harvie (red card) 30'	Attendance: 2,376; Referee: Andrew Dallas

25 August 2018 3	Ayr United	4–1	Dunfermline Athletic	Somerset Park, Ayr
15:00	Forrest 5', 37'; Shankland 39'; Moffat 81'	Report	Longridge 55'	Attendance: 2,597; Referee: Euan Anderson

1 September 2018 4	Queen of the South	5–0	Ayr United	Palmerston Park, Dumfries
15:00	Dobbie 12', 20' (pen.), 22', 84'; Harkins 37'	Report	Harvie (red card) 79'	Attendance: 2,498; Referee: Colin Steven

15 September 2018 5	Ayr United	3–2	Falkirk	Somerset Park, Ayr
15:00	Shankland 48'; Geggan 63'; Fasan 65' (o.g.)	Report	Rudden 18'; Petravičius 25'	Attendance: 2,250; Referee: Alan Newlands

22 September 2018 6	Alloa Athletic	0–2	Ayr United	Recreation Park, Alloa
15:00		Report	Shankland 23', 65'	Attendance: 949; Referee: Gavin Duncan

29 September 2018 7	Greenock Morton	1–5	Ayr United	Cappielow, Greenock
15:00	Telfer 35'	Report	Shankland 19', 75'; Moore 73', 81'; McDaid 89'	Attendance: 2,273; Referee: Steven McLean

6 October 2018 8	Ayr United	2–0	Dundee United	Somerset Park, Ayr
15:00	Shankland 21'; McDaid 74'	Report		Attendance: 2,621; Referee: Greg Aitken

20 October 2018 9	Ross County	2–1	Ayr United	Victoria Park, Dingwall
15:00	McKay 23'; Mullin 34'	Report	Shankland 50'	Attendance: 3,140; Referee: Steven McLean

27 October 2018 10	Partick Thistle	0–1	Ayr United	Firhill Stadium, Glasgow
15:00		Report	Rose 77'	Attendance: 3,491; Referee: Bobby Madden

30 October 2018 11	Ayr United	3–0	Alloa Athletic	Somerset Park, Ayr
19:45	Shankland 46', 90+2'; Forrest 81'	Report		Attendance: 1,742; Referee: David Munro

3 November 2018 12	Falkirk	0–1	Ayr United	Falkirk Stadium, Falkirk
15:00		Report	Moore 51'	Attendance: 4,310; Referee: Greg Aitken

10 November 2018 13	Ayr United	1–1	Queen of the South	Somerset Park, Ayr
15:00	Rose 75'	Report	Murray 81'	Attendance: 2,539; Referee: John Beaton

17 November 2018 14	Ayr United	0–0	Greenock Morton	Somerset Park, Ayr
15:00	Moore (red card) 62'	Report		Attendance: 2,346; Referee: Willie Collum

30 November 2018 15	Dundee United	0–5	Ayr United	Tannadice Park, Dundee
19:45		Report	Shankland 3', 41', 87' (pen.), 89'; Moffat 78'	Attendance: 6,097; Referee: Don Robertson

15 December 2018 16	Ayr United	3–3	Ross County	Somerset Park, Ayr
15:00	Shankland 21' (pen.), 25'; Geggan 43'	Report	Mullin 12'; McKay 48' (pen.); Cowie 52'	Attendance: 2,030; Referee: Bobby Madden

22 December 2018 17	Dunfermline Athletic	0–0	Ayr United	East End Park, Dunfermline
19:45		Report		Attendance: 4,916; Referee: Steven McLean

29 December 2018 18	Queen of the South	1–1	Ayr United	Palmerston Park, Dumfries
15:00	Todd 29'	Report	Moffat 41'	Attendance: 2,349; Referee: Alan Newlands

5 January 2019 19	Ayr United	0–1	Falkirk	Somerset Park, Ayr
15:00		Report	Rudden 56'	Attendance: 2,729; Referee: Bobby Madden

12 January 2019 20	Inverness CT	1–0	Ayr United	Caledonian Stadium, Inverness
15:00	White 64'	Report		Attendance: 2,283; Referee: Alan Newlands

25 January 2019 21	Ayr United	1–0	Dundee United	Somerset Park, Ayr
19:45	Moore 4'	Report	Gomis (red card) 89'	Attendance: 2,232; Referee: Don Robertson

29 January 2019 22	Ayr United	2–3	Inverness CT	Somerset Park, Ayr
19:45	McDaid 53'; Shankland 85'	Report	Austin 9', 12'; Polworth 18'	Attendance: 1,559; Referee: Nick Walsh

2 February 2019 23	Alloa Athletic	1–3	Ayr United	Recreation Park, Alloa
15:00	Trouten 30'	Report	Moffat 29', 88'; Shankland 52' (pen.)	Attendance: 957; Referee: Mike Roncone

16 February 2019 24	Greenock Morton	0–0	Ayr United	Cappielow, Greenock
15:00		Report		Attendance: 2,335; Referee: Colin Steven

23 February 2019 25	Ayr United	0–1	Dunfermline Athletic	Somerset Park, Ayr
15:00		Report	Longridge 71' (pen.)	Attendance: 2,202; Referee: David Munro

26 February 2019 26	Ross County	3–2	Ayr United	Victoria Park, Dingwall
19:45	McKay 35', 70', 75'	Report	Shankland 62'; Murdoch 73'	Attendance: 3,489; Referee: Nick Walsh

8 March 2019 27	Falkirk	2–0	Ayr United	Falkirk Stadium, Falkirk
19:05	McGhee 27', 40'	Report		Attendance: 4,344; Referee: Alan Muir

29 March 2019 28	Dunfermline Athletic	0–1	Ayr United	East End Park, Dunfermline
19:05		Report	McDaid 31'	Attendance: 4,671; Referee: Gavin Duncan

2 April 2019 29	Ayr United	1–1	Greenock Morton	Somerset Park, Ayr
19:45	Shankland 21' (pen.)	Report	Kiltie 71'	Attendance: 1,802; Referee: Willie Collum

6 April 2019 30	Ayr United	0–1	Inverness CT	Somerset Park, Ayr
15:00		Report	McKay 66'	Attendance: 1,566; Referee: Craig Thomson

9 April 2019 31	Ayr United	1–0	Queen of the South	Somerset Park, Ayr
19:45	Shankland 43' (pen.)	Report		Attendance: 1,582; Referee: Greg Aitken

12 April 2019 32	Dundee United	2–1	Ayr United	Tannadice Park, Dundee
19:05	Šafranko 63'; McMullan 74'	Report	Bell 24'	Attendance: 4,392; Referee: Bobby Madden

19 April 2019 33	Ayr United	1–3	Ross County	Somerset Park, Ayr
19:05	Miller 12'; Docherty (red card) 90+5'	Report	Graham 42', 46', 71'	Attendance: 1,692; Referee: Euan Anderson

23 April 2019 34	Ayr United	0–1	Partick Thistle	Somerset Park, Ayr
19:45		Report	Gordon 17'	Attendance: 2,429; Referee: Alan Newlands

27 April 2019 35	Partick Thistle	1–2	Ayr United	Firhill Stadium, Glasgow
15:00	Gordon 9'	Report	Smith 17'; Muirhead 56'	Attendance: 3,855; Referee: Nick Walsh

4 May 2019 36	Ayr United	1–1	Alloa Athletic	Somerset Park, Ayr
15:00	Shankland 37'	Report	Shields 33'	Attendance: 1,665; Referee: Willie Collum

=== Premiership Play–Off ===
7 May 2019 Quarter-final 1st Leg	Ayr United	1–3	Inverness CT	Somerset Park, Ayr
19:45	Rose 65'	Report	Trafford 33'; White 51', 76' (pen.)	Attendance: 2,171; Referee: Alan Muir

11 May 2019 Quarter-final 2nd Leg	Inverness CT	1–1 (4–2 agg.)	Ayr United	Caledonian Stadium, Inverness
19:45	Donaldson 79'	Report	McCowan 19'	Attendance: 2,323; Referee: Steven McLean

=== Scottish League Cup ===
14 July 2018 Group Stage	Ayr United	3–1	Greenock Morton	Somerset Park, Ayr
15:00	Shankland 48', 72', 75'	Report	Tidser 14'	Attendance: 1,586; Referee: Willie Collum

21 July 2018 Group Stage	Albion Rovers	0–2	Ayr United	Cliftonhill, Coatbridge
15:00		Report	Forrest 15'; Bell 80'	Attendance: 519; Referee: Mike Roncone

24 July 2018 Group Stage	Ayr United	5–0	Stenhousemuir	Somerset Park, Ayr
19:45	Shankland 2', 8', 46'; Moffat 41', 86'	Report		Attendance: 1,227; Referee: David Munro

28 July 2018 Group Stage	Partick Thistle	0–2	Ayr United	Firhill Stadium, Glasgow
15:00		Report	Moffat 6'; Shankland 66'	Attendance: 2,871; Referee: Nick Walsh

==== Knockout round ====
8 August 2018 Round 2	Dundee	0–3	Ayr United	Dens Park, Dundee
19:45	Moussa (red card) 77'; Kusunga (red card) 90+3'	Report	Shankland 51', 86'; Moffat 89'	Attendance: 3,151; Referee: John Beaton

26 September 2018 Quarter-final	Rangers	4–0	Ayr United	Ibrox Stadium, Glasgow
19:45	Katić 16'; Middleton 31', 70'; Morelos 49'	Report		Attendance: 35,042; Referee: Bobby Madden

=== Scottish Challenge Cup ===
14 August 2018 First Round	Queen's Park	0–0 (4–2 p)	Ayr United	Hampden Park, Glasgow
19:45		Report		Attendance: 834

=== Scottish Cup ===
24 November 2018 Third Round	Beith Juniors	0–3	Ayr United	Bellsdale Park, Beith
15:00		Report	Shankland 64'; Docherty 79'; Moffat 88'	Attendance: 1,780; Referee: Colin Steven

19 January 2019 Fourth Round	Auchinleck Talbot	1–0	Ayr United	Beechwood Park, Auchinleck
15:00	McCracken 78'	Report		Attendance: 3,100; Referee: Euan Anderson

== Squad statistics ==
=== Appearances ===
As of 11 May 2019

No.	Pos	Nat	Player	Total		League One		League Cup		Scottish Cup		Other	
No.	Pos	Nat	Player	Apps	Goals	Apps	Goals	Apps	Goals	Apps	Goals	Apps	Goals
1	GK	(Scotland) SCO	Ross Doohan	47	0	36+0	0	6+0	0	2+0	0	3+0	0
2	DF	(Scotland) SCO	Chris Higgins	5	0	0+3	0	0+0	0	2+0	0	0+0	0
3	DF	(Scotland) SCO	Daniel Harvie	44	0	31+2	0	6+0	0	2+0	0	3+0	0
4	MF	(Scotland) SCO	Mark Kerr	30	0	18+4	0	5+1	0	0+0	0	1+1	0
5	DF	(Scotland) SCO	Michael Rose	44	1	34+0	0	5+0	0	2+0	0	3+0	1
6	MF	(Scotland) SCO	Andy Geggan	28	2	22+1	2	3+0	0	2+0	0	0+0	0
7	FW	(Scotland) SCO	Michael Moffat	44	10	29+5	5	4+2	4	2+0	1	1+1	0
8	MF	(Scotland) SCO	Robbie Crawford	44	0	30+3	0	5+1	0	2+0	0	2+1	0
9	FW	(Scotland) SCO	Craig Moore	26	4	8+12	4	1+3	0	1+0	0	1+0	0
10	MF	(Scotland) SCO	Alan Forrest	25	4	10+7	3	6+0	1	0+0	0	0+2	0
11	FW	(Scotland) SCO	Declan McDaid	45	4	20+14	4	1+5	0	2+0	0	3+0	0
12	MF	(Scotland) SCO	Craig McGuffie	16	0	0+9	0	1+3	0	0+2	0	1+0	0
14	DF	(Scotland) SCO	David Ferguson	6	0	1+2	0	3+0	0	0+0	0	0+0	0
15	DF	(Scotland) SCO	Steven Bell	33	2	21+5	1	2+2	1	1+1	0	1+0	0
16	MF	(Scotland) SCO	Jamie Adams	19	0	9+4	0	5+1	0	0+0	0	0+0	0
17	FW	(Scotland) SCO	Lawrence Shankland	41	34	29+2	24	6+0	9	1+0	1	2+1	0
18	MF	(Scotland) SCO	Andy Murdoch	44	1	33+1	1	6+0	0	1+0	0	3+0	0
19	GK	(New Zealand) NZL	Ellis Hare-Reid	0	0	0+0	0	0+0	0	0+0	0	0+0	0
20	MF	(Scotland) SCO	James Hilton	0	0	0+0	0	0+0	0	0+0	0	0+0	0
22	DF	(Scotland) SCO	Finn Ecrepont	1	0	0+1	0	0+0	0	0+0	0	0+0	0
23	MF	(Scotland) SCO	Ross Docherty	23	1	9+10	0	0+0	0	1+1	1	2+0	0
25	MF	(Scotland) SCO	Luke McCowan	9	1	2+3	0	0+0	0	0+1	0	2+1	1
27	DF	(Scotland) SCO	Liam Smith	39	1	32+1	1	1+0	0	1+1	0	3+0	0
28	MF	(Scotland) SCO	Nicky Cadden	11	0	6+4	0	0+0	0	0+0	0	0+1	0
29	MF	(Scotland) SCO	Calvin Miller	14	1	8+5	1	0+0	0	0+0	0	0+1	0
30	DF	(Scotland) SCO	Aaron Muirhead	11	1	8+1	1	0+0	0	0+0	0	2+0	0

== Team statistics ==
=== League table ===
Pos	Team	Pld	W	D	L	GF	GA	GD	Pts	Promotion, qualification or relegation
2	Dundee United	36	19	8	9	49	40	+9	65	Qualification for the Premiership play-off semi-final
3	Inverness Caledonian Thistle	36	14	14	8	48	40	+8	56	Qualification for the Premiership play-off quarter-final
4	Ayr United	36	15	9	12	50	38	+12	54	Qualification for the Premiership play-off quarter-final
5	Greenock Morton	36	11	13	12	36	45	−9	46	
6	Partick Thistle	36	12	7	17	43	52	−9	43	

Source: SPFL
Rules for classification: 1) Points; 2) Goal difference; 3) Goals scored; 4) Points in head-to-head matches; 5) Goal difference in hth matches; 6). Goals scored in hth matches; 7). Play-off (only for deciding promotion, play-off participation and relegation).

=== Division summary ===
Round	1	2	3	4	5	6	7	8	9	10	11	12	13	14	15	16	17	18	19	20	21	22	23	24	25	26	27	28	29	30	31	32	33	34	35	36
Ground	H	A	H	A	H	A	A	H	A	A	H	A	H	H	A	H	A	A	H	A	H	H	A	A	H	A	A	A	H	H	H	A	H	H	A	H
Result	W	D	W	L	W	W	W	W	L	W	W	W	D	D	W	D	D	D	L	L	W	L	W	D	L	L	L	W	D	L	W	L	L	L	W	D
Position	1	3	1	6	3	1	1	1	2	2	1	1	1	1	1	1	1	2	2	2	2	2	2	2	2	3	3	3	3	4	3	3	3	3	3	4

Updated to match(es) played on 28 April 2018. Source:
A = Away; H = Home; W = Win; D = Draw; L = Loss

=== League Cup table ===
Pos	Team	Pld	W	PW	PL	L	GF	GA	GD	Pts	Qualification	AYR	PAR	GMO	STE	ALB
1	Ayr United (Q)	4	4	0	0	0	12	1	+11	12	Qualification for the Second round	—	—	3–1	5–0	—
2	Partick Thistle (Q)	4	3	0	0	1	6	3	+3	9	Qualification for the Second round	0–2	—	2–1	—	—
3	Greenock Morton	4	2	0	0	2	9	5	+4	6		—	—	—	2–0	5–0
4	Stenhousemuir	4	1	0	0	3	4	9	−5	3		—	0–2	—	—	4–0
5	Albion Rovers	4	0	0	0	4	0	13	−13	0		0–2	0–2	—	—	—

Rules for classification: 1) goal difference, 2) goals scored, 3) away goals scored, 4) matches won, 5) away matches won, 6) drawing of lots.
(Q) Qualified to the phase indicated

== Transfers ==
=== Players in ===
Player	From	Fee
(Scotland) Daniel Harvie	(Scotland) Aberdeen	Free
(New Zealand) Ellis Hare-Reid	(Spain) Orihuela	Free
(Scotland) Andy Murdoch	(Scotland) Greenock Morton	Free
(Scotland) Ross Doohan	(Scotland) Celtic	Loan
(Scotland) Liam Smith	(Scotland) Hearts	Free
(Scotland) Aaron Muirhead	(Scotland) Falkirk	Free
(Scotland) Calvin Miller	(Scotland) Celtic	Loan
(Scotland) Nicky Cadden	(Scotland) Livingston	Loan

=== Players out ===
Player	To	Fee
(Scotland) Lyle Avci	(Scotland) Stranraer	Free
(Scotland) Jordan Hart	(Scotland) Queen's Park	Free
(Scotland) Craig Reid	(Scotland) East Kilbride	Free
(Scotland) Leon Murphy	(Scotland) Glenafton Athletic	Loan
(Scotland) David Waite	(Scotland) Auchinleck Talbot	Free
(Scotland) Patrick Boyle	(Scotland) Peterhead	Free
(Scotland) Craig McGuffie	(Scotland) Raith Rovers	Loan
(Scotland) David Ferguson	(Scotland) Dumbarton	Loan
(Scotland) Chris Higgins	(Scotland) East Fife	Loan
