= 2017–18 Ayr United F.C. season =

Ayr United
2017–18 season
- Manager: Ian McCall
- Stadium: Somerset Park
- Scottish League One: 1st (champions)
- Scottish Cup: Fifth round
- League Cup: Second round
- Challenge Cup: Second round
- Top goalscorer: League: Lawrence Shankland (26); All: Lawrence Shankland (29)
- Highest home attendance: 9,346 v Rangers, Scottish Cup, 11 February 2018
- Lowest home attendance: 906 v Montrose, Challenge Cup, 29 August 2017
- Average home league attendance: 1,532
Home colours	Away colours

The 2017–18 season was Ayr United’s 108th season of competitive football and their first season back in League One following their relegation from the Championship in the 2016–17 season. Ayr also competed in the League Cup, Scottish Cup and the Challenge Cup.

== Summary ==
=== Season ===
In their first season back in the third–tier of Scottish football, Ayr United finished in first place and were promoted as Champions back to the Scottish Championship after only one season in League One.

== Results and fixtures ==
Win Draw Loss Postponed

=== Scottish League One ===
5 August 2017 1	Albion Rovers	1 – 5	Ayr United	Cliftonhill, Coatbridge
15:00	Shields 87'	Report	McDaid 2'; Moffat 34'; Moore 39', 70' (pen.), 79'	Attendance: 806; Referee: Graham Beaton

12 August 2017 2	Ayr United	3 – 0	Forfar Athletic	Somerset Park, Ayr
15:00	Moore 37'; McDaid 37'; Crawford 81'	Report		Attendance: 1,399; Referee: David Lowe

19 August 2017 3	Stranraer	3 – 4	Ayr United	Stair Park, Stranraer
15:00	Wallace 16'; Thomson 79', 81'	Report	McDaid 42'; Moore 49'; Moffat 59'; Boyle 85'	Attendance: 1,070; Referee: Craig Charleston

26 August 2017 4	Ayr United	1 – 2	Arbroath	Somerset Park, Ayr
15:00	Higgins 42'	Report	Kader 45+2'; Whatley 59'	Attendance: 1,569; Referee: Mike Roncone

9 September 2017 5	Raith Rovers	2 – 1	Ayr United	Stark's Park, Kirkcaldy
15:00	Vaughan 50'; Thomson 59'	Report	Shankland 45+2'; Higgins (red card) 88'	Attendance: 2,286; Referee: Alan Muir

16 September 2017 6	Ayr United	3 – 3	Alloa Athletic	Somerset Park, Ayr
15:00	Shankland 4', 90+4'; Adams 80'	Report	Reid 36' (o.g.); Cawley 61'; Taggart 84' (pen.)	Attendance: 1,306; Referee: Euan Anderson

23 September 2017 7	Queen's Park	0 – 2	Ayr United	Hampden Park, Glasgow
15:00		Report	Adams 23'; Shankland 68'	Attendance: 1,051; Referee: Alan Muir

30 September 2017 8	Ayr United	3 – 0	East Fife	Somerset Park, Ayr
15:00	Shankland 7'; Geggan 50'; Higgins 73'	Report	Page (red card) 61'	Attendance: 1,382; Referee: Barry Cook

14 October 2017 9	Ayr United	2 – 2	Airdrieonians	Somerset Park, Ayr
15:00	Geggan 55', 57'	Report	McGregor 29'; Furtado 65'	Attendance: 1,513; Referee: Steven Reid

21 October 2017 10	Forfar Athletic	0 – 5	Ayr United	Station Park, Forfar
15:00		Report	Moffat 15', 64', 81'; Shankland 52'; Moore 85'	Attendance: 664; Referee: Steven Kirkland

28 October 2017 11	Ayr United	2 – 0	Stranraer	Somerset Park, Ayr
15:00	Moffat 66'; Shankland 80'	Report	Robertson (red card) 75'; Bell (red card) 90+1'	Attendance: 1,473; Referee: Mat Northcroft

4 November 2017 12	Arbroath	1 – 4	Ayr United	Gayfield Park, Arbroath
15:00	Swankie 86'	Report	Shankland 36', 57'; Gold 53' (o.g.); Moore 58'	Attendance: 922; Referee: Alan Muir

14 November 2017 13	Ayr United	3 – 0	Raith Rovers	Somerset Park, Ayr
19:45	Shankland 16'; Crawford 22'; Moore 90+3'	Report		Attendance: 2,040; Referee: Barry Cook

25 November 2017 14	Alloa Athletic	1 – 2	Ayr United	Recreation Park, Alloa
15:00	Taggart 76'	Report	Moffat 4'; Moore 90+1'	Attendance: 854; Referee: David Munro

2 December 2017 15	Ayr United	3 – 2	Albion Rovers	Somerset Park, Ayr
15:00	Moore 16'; Shankland 73'; C.Higgins 77'	Report	S.Higgins 25'; Trouten 75'	Attendance: 1,426; Referee: Craig Charleston

9 December 2017 16	Ayr United	3 – 2	Queen's Park	Somerset Park, Ayr
15:00	Moore 24' (pen.); McDaid 79'; Forrest 88'	Report	McVey 42'; Reid 48' (o.g.)	Attendance: 1,320; Referee: Gavin Ross

16 December 2017 17	East Fife	1 – 4	Ayr United	Bayview Stadium, Methil
15:00	Duggan 36'	Report	Rose 57', 72'; Moore 75'; Shankland 88'	Attendance: 637; Referee: John McKendrick

23 December 2017 18	Airdrieonians	2 – 0	Ayr United	Excelsior Stadium, Airdrie
15:00	Russell 4'; Brownlie 26'	Report		Attendance: 1,113; Referee: Scott Millar

30 December 2017 19	Ayr United	2 – 3	Forfar Athletic	Somerset Park, Ayr
15:00	Moffat 45'; Shankland 67'	Report	Hornby 75'; Aitken 83', 88'	Attendance: 1,477; Referee: Colin Steven

2 January 2018 20	Stranraer	1 – 5	Ayr United	Stair Park, Stranraer
15:00	Turner 80'	Report	Shankland 8', 53'; Moffat 39'; Forrest 49', 63'	Attendance: 1,143; Referee: Grant Irvine

6 January 2018 21	Ayr United	1 – 2	Arbroath	Somerset Park, Ayr
15:00	Forrest 4'	Report	Wallace 68'; O'Brien (red card) 82'; McIntosh 88'	Attendance: 1,436; Referee: Steven Kirkland

13 January 2018 22	Raith Rovers	1 – 1	Ayr United	Stark's Park, Kirkcaldy
15:00	Spence 47'	Report	Shankland 34'	Attendance: 3,064; Referee: Barry Cook

27 January 2018 23	Queen's Park	1 – 4	Ayr United	Hampden Park, Glasgow
15:00	Cummins 89'	Report	Moore 5'; Forrest 43'; McGuffie 80', 87'	Attendance: 1,233; Referee: Greg Aitken

3 February 2018 24	Ayr United	1 – 2	Alloa Athletic	Somerset Park, Ayr
15:00	Shankland 10'	Report	McCart 14'; Stewart 17'	Attendance: 1,139; Referee: Craig Napier

17 February 2018 25	Ayr United	3 – 0	East Fife	Somerset Park, Ayr
15:00	McDaid 32'; Shankland 53'; Forrest 60' (pen.)	Report		Attendance: 1,170; Referee: David Lowe

24 February 2018 26	Ayr United	3 – 0	Airdrieonians	Somerset Park, Ayr
15:00	Geggan 50'; Shankland 81' (pen.), 84'	Report		Attendance: 1,456; Referee: Alan Newlands

10 March 2018 27	Ayr United	3 – 0	Raith Rovers	Somerset Park, Ayr
15:00	Shankland 34'; Adams 43'; Moffat 53'	Report		Attendance: 2,126; Referee: Gavin Ross

14 March 2018 28	Arbroath	1 – 1	Ayr United	Gayfield Park, Arbroath
19:45	Denholm 45'	Report	McGuffie 86'	Attendance: 653; Referee: Colin Steven

17 March 2018 29	Forfar Athletic	0 – 2	Ayr United	Station Park, Forfar
15:00	Munro (red card) 81'	Report	Moffat 10'; Moore 81' (pen.)	Attendance: 629; Referee: Kevin Graham

20 March 2018 30	Albion Rovers	2 – 3	Ayr United	Cliftonhill, Coatbridge
19:45	Hester 39'; Trouten 66'	Report	Moore 28'; Adams 36'; Shankland 75'	Attendance: 652; Referee: Stephen Finnie

24 March 2018 31	Ayr United	4 – 0	Queen's Park	Somerset Park, Ayr
15:00	Shankland 10', 29', 34'; Moore 76' (pen.)	Report		Attendance: 1,600; Referee: Barry Cook

31 March 2018 32	East Fife	2 – 3	Ayr United	Bayview Stadium, Methil
15:00	Duggan 22', 53'	Report	Forrest 4'; Bell 72'; Moore 88' (pen.)	Attendance: 759; Referee: David Lowe

7 April 2018 33	Airdrieonians	1 – 2	Ayr United	Excelsior Stadium, Airdrie
15:00	Carrick 10'; Watt (red card) 90+2'	Report	Crawford 37'; Shankland 70'	Attendance: 1,129; Referee: Colin Steven

14 April 2018 34	Ayr United	1 – 2	Stranraer	Somerset Park, Ayr
15:00	Adams 16'; Shankland (red card) 32'	Report	Anderson 3'; Agnew 85' (pen.)	Attendance: 2,323; Referee: Euan Anderson

22 April 2018 35	Alloa Athletic	2 – 1	Ayr United	Recreation Park, Alloa
15:00	Flannigan 21'; Crane 33'	Report	Moore 50'	Attendance: 1,749; Referee: Greg Aitken

28 April 2018 36	Ayr United	2 – 0	Albion Rovers	Somerset Park, Ayr
15:00	Moore 34'; McDaid 86'	Report		Attendance: 2,441; Referee: Barry Cook

=== Scottish League Cup ===
==== Group stage ====
14 July 2017 Group stage	Ayr United	1 – 0	Kilmarnock	Somerset Park, Ayr
19:45	Geggan 39'	Report		Attendance: 6,417; Referee: John Beaton

18 July 2017 Group stage	Dumbarton	1 – 3	Ayr United	Dumbarton Football Stadium, Dumbarton
15:00	Nadé 45+2'	Report	Dowie 36' (o.g.); McDaid 71'; Crawford 88'	Attendance: 615; Referee: Barry Cook

14 July 2017 Group stage	Ayr United	5 – 1	Clyde	Somerset Park, Ayr
19:45	Crawford 20'; Moore 30', 64'; McDaid 75'	Report		Attendance: 1,501; Referee: Colin Steven

29 July 2017 Group stage	Annan Athletic	1 – 6	Ayr United	Galabank, Annan
15:00	Sinnamon 85'	Report	Docherty 1'; McGuffie 3'; Moffat 25'; Moore 45'; Geggan 67'; McDaid 81'	Attendance: 659; Referee: Steven Reid

==== Knockout round ====
8 August 2017 Second round	Hibernian	5 – 0	Ayr United	Easter Road, Edinburgh
19:45	Stokes 20', 59'; Murray 31'; Ambrose 69'; Matulevičius 85'	Report		Attendance: 8,135; Referee: Kevin Clancy

=== Scottish Challenge Cup ===
16 August 2017 Round 1	East Stirlingshire	1 – 5	Ayr United	Ochilview Park, Stenhousemuir
19:45		Report	Murphy 26'; Gilmour 38'; Moore 54'; Forrest 58'; McCowan 88'	Attendance: 274; Referee: David Munro

29 August 2017 Round 2	Ayr United	1 – 1 (a.e.t.) (5 – 6 p)	Montrose	Somerset Park, Ayr
19:45	Moore 28'	Report	Campbell 2'	Attendance: 906; Referee: Grant Irvine

=== Scottish Cup ===
18 November 2017 Round 3	Banks O'Dee	2 – 6	Ayr United	Spain Park, Aberdeen
15:00	Watt 9' (pen.), 26' (pen.); Winton (red card) 56'	Report	Shankland 1', 37'; McDaid 43', 45+1'; Moore 63', 66'	Attendance: 469; Referee: Craig Napier

20 January 2018 Round 4	Ayr United	4 – 1	Arbroath	Somerset Park, Ayr
15:00	McDaid 9', 83'; Shankland 58'; Moore 90+3'	Report	McCord 79'	Attendance: 1,151; Referee: Mike Roncone

11 February 2018 Round 5	Ayr United	1 – 6	Rangers	Somerset Park, Ayr
15:00	Forrest 11'	Report	Morelos 31', 72'; Cummings 66'; Windass 69', 81'; Murphy 88'	Attendance: 9,346; Referee: Nick Walsh

== Squad statistics ==
=== Appearances ===
As of 28 April 2018

No.	Pos	Nat	Player	Total		League One		League Cup		Challenge Cup		Scottish Cup	
No.	Pos	Nat	Player	Apps	Goals	Apps	Goals	Apps	Goals	Apps	Goals	Apps	Goals
1	GK	(Scotland) SCO	Jordan Hart	33	0	25+0	0	5+0	0	2+0	0	1+0	0
2	DF	(Scotland) SCO	Chris Higgins	26	3	19+0	3	5+0	0	2+0	0	0+0	0
3	DF	(Scotland) SCO	Patrick Boyle	36	1	26+1	1	5+0	0	1+0	0	3+0	0
4	MF	(Scotland) SCO	Brian Gilmour	19	1	7+7	0	1+2	0	1+1	1	0+0	0
5	DF	(Scotland) SCO	Michael Rose	40	3	33+1	2	2+0	0	1+0	1	3+0	0
6	MF	(Scotland) SCO	Andy Geggan	34	6	25+1	4	5+0	2	1+0	0	2+0	0
7	FW	(Scotland) SCO	Michael Moffat	45	13	30+5	11	5+0	2	1+1	0	3+0	0
8	MF	(Scotland) SCO	Robbie Crawford	28	5	21+1	3	4+0	2	1+0	0	1+0	0
9	FW	(Scotland) SCO	Craig Moore	41	27	15+16	19	5+0	3	2+0	2	3+0	3
10	MF	(Scotland) SCO	Alan Forrest	34	9	16+13	7	0+1	0	1+1	1	2+0	1
11	FW	(Scotland) SCO	Declan McDaid	43	13	28+6	6	5+0	3	1+0	0	2+1	4
12	MF	(Scotland) SCO	Craig McGuffie	38	4	6+23	3	2+2	1	1+1	0	0+3	0
14	DF	(Scotland) SCO	David Ferguson	34	0	21+4	0	1+3	0	2+0	0	2+1	0
15	MF	(Scotland) SCO	James Hilton	2	0	0+1	0	0+0	0	0+1	0	0+0	0
16	MF	(Scotland) SCO	Jamie Adams	30	5	21+4	5	3+0	0	0+0	0	2+0	0
17	FW	(Scotland) SCO	Lawrence Shankland	33	29	30+0	26	0+0	0	0+0	0	3+0	3
18	MF	(Scotland) SCO	Stuart Faulds	8	0	0+3	0	3+0	0	1+0	0	0+1	0
19	GK	(New Zealand) NZL	Ellis Hare-Reid	0	0	0+0	0	0+0	0	0+0	0	0+0	0
20	GK	(Scotland) SCO	Lyle Avci	0	0	0+0	0	0+0	0	0+0	0	0+0	0
20	GK	(Scotland) SCO	Jack Ruddy	13	0	11+0	0	0+0	0	0+0	0	2+0	0
21	DF	(Scotland) SCO	David Waite	1	0	0+0	0	0+0	0	1+0	0	0+0	0
22	MF	(Scotland) SCO	Kieran Balfour	0	0	0+0	0	0+0	0	0+0	0	0+0	0
23	MF	(Scotland) SCO	Ross Docherty	23	1	14+2	0	5+0	1	1+0	0	1+0	0
24	MF	(Scotland) SCO	Leon Murphy	11	1	0+5	0	0+4	0	1+0	1	0+1	0
25	MF	(Scotland) SCO	Luke McCowan	5	1	0+1	0	0+1	0	0+2	1	0+1	0
26	DF	(Scotland) SCO	Craig Reid	29	0	19+4	0	2+0	0	1+0	0	3+0	0
27	MF	(Scotland) SCO	Mark Kerr	14	0	14+0	0	0+0	0	0+0	0	0+0	0
28	DF	(Scotland) SCO	Steven Bell	15	1	15+0	1	0+0	0	0+0	0	0+0	0

== Team statistics ==
=== League table ===
Pos	Team	Pld	W	D	L	GF	GA	GD	Pts	Promotion, qualification or relegation
1	Ayr United (C, P)	36	24	4	8	92	42	+50	76	Promotion to the Championship
2	Raith Rovers	36	22	9	5	68	32	+36	75	Qualification for the Championship play-offs
3	Alloa Athletic (O, P)	36	17	9	10	56	43	+13	60	Qualification for the Championship play-offs
4	Arbroath	36	17	8	11	70	51	+19	59	Qualification for the Championship play-offs
5	Stranraer	36	16	5	15	58	66	−8	53	

Source: SPFL
Rules for classification: 1) Points; 2) Goal difference; 3) Number of goals scored
(C) Champions; (O) Play-off winners; (P) Promoted

=== Division summary ===
Round	1	2	3	4	5	6	7	8	9	10	11	12	13	14	15	16	17	18	19	20	21	22	23	24	25	26	27	28	29	30	31	32	33	34	35	36
Ground	A	H	A	H	A	H	A	H	H	A	H	A	H	A	H	H	A	A	H	A	H	A	A	H	H	H	H	A	A	A	H	A	A	H	A	H
Result	W	W	W	L	L	D	W	W	D	W	W	W	W	W	W	W	W	L	L	W	L	D	W	L	W	W	W	D	W	W	W	W	W	L	L	W
Position	1	1	1	2	2	2	3	2	2	2	2	1	1	1	1	1	1	1	1	1	2	2	1	2	2	2	2	2	1	1	1	1	1	1	2	1

Updated to match(es) played on 28 April 2018. Source:
A = Away; H = Home; W = Win; D = Draw; L = Loss

=== League Cup Table ===
Pos	Team	Pld	W	PW	PL	L	GF	GA	GD	Pts	Qualification	AYR	KIL	CLY	ANN	DUM
1	Ayr United (Q)	4	4	0	0	0	15	3	+12	12	Qualification for the Second Round	—	1–0	5–1	—	—
2	Kilmarnock (Q)	4	3	0	0	1	9	3	+6	9	Qualification for the Second Round	—	—	4–2	—	3–0
3	Clyde	4	2	0	0	2	7	11	−4	6		—	—	—	2–1	2–1
4	Annan Athletic	4	0	1	0	3	2	10	−8	2		1–6	0–2	—	—	—
5	Dumbarton	4	0	0	1	3	2	8	−6	1		1–3	—	—	0–0p	—

Rules for classification: 1) goal difference, 2) goals scored, 3) away goals scored, 4) matches won, 5) away matches won, 6) drawing of lots.
(Q) Qualified to the phase indicated

== Transfers ==
=== Players in ===
Player	From	Fee
(Scotland) Chris Higgins	(Scotland) Queen of the South	Free
(Scotland) Michael Moffat	(Scotland) Dunfermline Athletic	Free
(Scotland) Andy Geggan	(Scotland) Dunfermline Athletic	Free
(Scotland) Craig Moore	(Scotland) Motherwell	Free
(Scotland) Craig Reid	(Scotland) Peterhead	Free
(Scotland) David Ferguson	(Scotland) Motherwell	Free
(Scotland) Lawrence Shankland	(Scotland) Aberdeen	Free
(Scotland) Steven Bell	(Scotland) Stranraer	Free
(Scotland) Jack Ruddy	(England) Wolverhampton Wanderers	Loan
(Scotland) Mark Kerr	(Scotland) Falkirk	Free

=== Players out ===
Player	To	Fee
(Scotland) Daryll Meggatt	(Scotland) Alloa Athletic	Free
(Republic of Ireland) Peter Murphy	(Scotland) Annan Athletic	Free
(Scotland) Gary Harkins	(Scotland) Greenock Morton	Free
(Scotland) Michael Wardrope	(Scotland) Kilwinning Rangers	Free
(Scotland) Greg Fleming	(Scotland) Peterhead	Free
(Scotland) Nicky Devlin	(England) Walsall	Free
(Scotland) Paul Cairney	(Scotland) Peterhead	Free
(Scotland) Conrad Balatoni	(Scotland) Falkirk	Free
(France) Farid El Alagui	(Scotland) Edinburgh City	Free
(Scotland) Lyle Avci	(Scotland) Troon	Loan
