= Robbie Crawford (footballer, born 1994) =

Scottish footballer (born 1994)

Personal information
- Full name: Robbie Crawford
- Date of birth: 22 June 1994 (age 32)
- Place of birth: Irvine, Scotland
- Position: Central midfielder

Team information
- Current team: Partick Thistle
- Number: 14

Youth career
- –2012: Ayr United

Senior career*
Years	Team	Apps	(Gls)
2012–2019	Ayr United	217	(16)
2019–2021	Livingston	29	(0)
2020–2021	→ Motherwell (loan)	14	(0)
2021–2022	Motherwell	15	(0)
2022	Partick Thistle	16	(0)
2022–2024	Greenock Morton	69	(8)
2024–	Partick Thistle	71	(2)
- * Club domestic league appearances and goals as of 18:35, 21 November 2026 (UTC)

Robbie Crawford (born 22 June 1994) is a Scottish footballer who plays as a central midfielder for Scottish Championship club Partick Thistle He has previously played for Ayr United, Livingston, Motherwell, Greenock Morton and is now in his second spell with Partick Thistle.

== Career ==
=== Early career ===
After making more than 200 appearances for Ayr United, on 15 June 2019 Crawford joined Scottish Premiership side Livingston on a two-year deal.

=== Motherwell ===
On 18 September 2020, Crawford signed on loan for Motherwell until January 2021. He moved to Motherwell on a permanent basis on 1 February 2021.

On 2 April 2021, Crawford signed a one-year contract extension with Motherwell.

=== Partick Thistle (first spell) ===
On 7 January 2022, Crawford signed a 6-month contract with Scottish Championship side Partick Thistle. Crawford scored his first goal for Thistle in a 2–1 Scottish Premiership play off quarter final first leg defeat against Inverness.

=== Greenock Morton ===
Crawford signed for Greenock Morton in August 2022, scoring his first goal in a 2–1 away victory against Cove Rangers

=== Partick Thistle return ===
Crawford returned to Partick Thistle for a second spell, signing a two-year pre contract deal in May 2024.

Crawford scored the first goal of his second spell at Thistle in a Scottish Cup tie away to Queen's Park.

In April 2026, Crawford signed a one year contract extension with Thistle, extending his deal until summer 2027.

== Career statistics ==
As of match played 27 July 2022

Appearances and goals by club, season and competition
Club	Season	League			Scottish Cup		League Cup		Other		Total	
Club	Season	Division	Apps	Goals	Apps	Goals	Apps	Goals	Apps	Goals	Apps	Goals
Ayr United	2011–12	Scottish First Division	1	0	0	0	0	0	0	0	1	0
Ayr United	2012–13	Scottish Second Division	34	0	2	0	1	0	1 (Note: Appearances in the Scottish Challenge Cup)	0	38	0
Ayr United	2013–14	Scottish League One	15	0	3	0	0	0	2	0	20	0
Ayr United	2014–15	Scottish League One	23	1	0	0	0	0	0	0	23	1
Ayr United	2015–16	Scottish League One	27	1	1	0	1	0	6 (Note: Two appearances in the Scottish Challenge Cup; Four appearances and two goals in the Scottish Championship play-offs)	2	35	3
Ayr United	2016–17	Scottish Championship	27	2	3	0	5	1	2	0	37	3
Ayr United	2017–18	Scottish League One	22	3	1	0	4	2	1	0	28	5
Ayr United	2018–19	Scottish Championship	33	0	2	0	6	0	3 (Note: One appearance in the Scottish Challenge Cup; Two appearances in the Scottish Premiership play-offs)	0	44	0
Ayr United	Total		182	7	12	0	17	3	15	2	226	12
Livingston	2019–20	Scottish Premiership	20	0	0	0	5	0	0	0	25	0
Livingston	2020–21	Scottish Premiership	1	0	0	0	0	0	0	0	1	0
Livingston	Total		21	0	0	0	5	0	0	0	26	0
Motherwell (loan)	2020–21	Scottish Premiership	10	0	0	0	1	0	0	0	11	0
Motherwell	2020–21	Scottish Premiership	12	0	3	0	0	0	0	0	15	0
Motherwell	2021–22	Scottish Premiership	0	0	0	0	3	0	0	0	3	0
Motherwell	Total		12	0	3	0	3	0	0	0	18	0
Partick Thistle	2021–22	Scottish Championship	16	0	2	0	0	0	2 (Note: Two appearances in the Scottish Premiership play-offs)	1	20	1
Career total			241	7	17	0	26	3	17	3	281	12
