= Alan Forrest =

Scottish footballer (born 1996)

Personal information
- Full name: Alan James Forrest
- Date of birth: 9 September 1996 (age 30)
- Place of birth: Prestwick, Ayrshire, Scotland
- Height: 1.75 m (5 ft 9 in)
- Positions: Attacking midfielder; right midfielder

Team information
- Current team: Dundee
- Number: 14

Youth career
- Ayr United

Senior career*
Years	Team	Apps	(Gls)
2013–2020	Ayr United	197	(48)
2020–2022	Livingston	62	(9)
2022–2026	Heart of Midlothian	129	(14)
2026–	Dundee	13	(0)

International career^{‡}
2016	Scotland U21	1	(0)
- * Club domestic league appearances and goals as of 21 November 2026 ‡ National team caps and goals as of 4 March 2019

Alan James Forrest (born 9 September 1996) is a Scottish footballer who plays as an attacking midfielder or right midfielder for Scottish Premiership club Dundee.

Born in Prestwick, he began his career with Ayr United, coming through their academy and making 245 appearances for the Honest Men. Forrest then spent two seasons with Scottish Premiership side Livingston, before joining Heart of Midlothian, where he made over 140 appearances in four seasons.

He is the younger brother of Celtic and Scotland winger James Forrest; their sister Lisa is also a footballer.

== Club career ==
=== Ayr United ===
Forrest made his debut for Ayr United in a Scottish Challenge Cup match against Queen's Park. He came off the bench to score an 89th-minute winner at Hampden Park. With this goal Forrest became Ayr's youngest ever goalscorer aged 16 years, 321 days.

During the 2019–20 Scottish Championship season, Forrest was awarded the Scottish Championship Player of the Month for September after scoring five goals in three league games.

=== Livingston ===
Forrest signed a pre-contract deal with Livingston on 10 April 2020, making the jump from the Scottish Championship to the Scottish Premiership. Forrest made his debut for Livingston on the opening day of the 2020–21 Scottish Premiership season in a 1–0 loss against St Mirren at St Mirren Park. He scored his first goal for Livingston in a 2–2 draw against Motherwell on 12 August 2020, at Fir Park.

=== Heart of Midlothian ===
On 1 June 2022, it was announced that Forrest would join Scottish Premiership side Heart of Midlothian on a two-year deal, following the expiry of his Livingston contract on 10 June. In an Edinburgh derby match on 7 October 2023, Forrest scored a stunning long-range goal which later won the club's goal of the season award. On 19 January 2024, he signed a two-year extension to his contract until 2026.

After four years and 147 appearances with the club, Forrest departed at the end of his contract in July 2026.

=== Dundee ===
On 13 July 2026, Forrest joined Scottish Premiership club Dundee on a two-year deal with the option of a third. He made his debut on 21 July as a substitute in a Scottish League Cup group stage match away to Ross County. In their next game, Forrest scored his first goal for the Dee at home to Clyde.

== International career ==
In 2016, Forrest made his debut for the Scotland under-21 team in a friendly against Slovakia.

== Career statistics ==
As of 21 November 2026

Appearances and goals by club, season and competition
Club	Season	League			Scottish Cup		League Cup		Other		Total	
Club	Season	Division	Apps	Goals	Apps	Goals	Apps	Goals	Apps	Goals	Apps	Goals
Ayr United	2013–14	Scottish League One	27	8	2	0	1	0	4 (Note: Two appearances and one goal in the Scottish Challenge Cup; Two appearances in the Scottish Championship play-offs)	1	34	9
Ayr United	2014–15	Scottish League One	31	9	2	0	2	0	1 (Note: Appearances in the Scottish Challenge Cup)	0	36	9
Ayr United	2015–16	Scottish League One	34	5	1	0	2	0	2 (Note: One appearance in the Scottish Challenge Cup; One appearance in the Scottish Championship play-offs)	0	39	5
Ayr United	2016–17	Scottish Championship	34	6	6	0	2	2	3	1	45	9
Ayr United	2017–18	Scottish League One	29	7	2	1	1	0	2	1	34	9
Ayr United	2018–19	Scottish Championship	17	3	0	0	6	1	2 (Note: One appearance in the Scottish Challenge Cup; One appearance in the Scottish Premiership play-offs)	0	25	4
Ayr United	2019–20	Scottish Championship	25	10	2	0	4	0	1	0	32	10
Ayr United	Total		197	48	15	1	18	3	15	3	245	55
Livingston	2020–21	Scottish Premiership	30	4	2	0	7	7	0	0	39	11
Livingston	2021–22	Scottish Premiership	32	5	2	0	3	1	0	0	37	6
Livingston	Total		62	9	4	0	10	8	0	0	76	17
Heart of Midlothian	2022–23	Scottish Premiership	35	4	3	0	1	0	8	1	47	5
Heart of Midlothian	2023–24	Scottish Premiership	31	4	4	0	1	0	2	0	38	4
Heart of Midlothian	2024–25	Scottish Premiership	30	4	3	0	1	0	7	1	41	5
Heart of Midlothian	2025–26	Scottish Premiership	12	0	0	0	4	0	0	0	16	0
Heart of Midlothian	Total		108	12	10	0	7	0	17	2	142	14
Dundee	2026–27	Scottish Premiership	13	0	0	0	3	1	0	0	16	1
Career total			379	69	29	1	37	12	32	5	477	87

== Honours ==
=== Club ===
Ayr United

- Scottish League One: 2017–18
- Scottish Championship Play-Offs: 2015-16

=== Individual ===
- Scottish Championship Player of the Month: September 2019
- Scottish Premiership Player of the Month: January 2024.

== See also ==
- List of Scottish football families
