= 2016–17 Ayr United F.C. season =

Ayr United
2016–17 season
- Manager: Ian McCall
- Stadium: Somerset Park
- Scottish Championship: Tenth Place (Relegated)
- Scottish Cup: Quarter-final
- League Cup: Second round
- Challenge Cup: Quarter-final
- Top goalscorer: League: Alan Forrest (6); All: Alan Forrest (9)
- Highest home attendance: 3,100 v Hibernian, Championship, 5 November 2016
- Lowest home attendance: 862 v Edinburgh City, League Cup, 23 July 2016
- Average home league attendance: 1,854
Home colours	Away colours

The 2016–17 season was Ayr United's 107th season of competitive football and their first season back in the second tier of Scottish football, now known as the Championship. Ayr also competed in the League Cup, Scottish Cup and the Challenge Cup.

== Summary ==
=== Season ===
In their first season back in the second tier of Scottish football, Ayr United finished in tenth place and were relegated back to League One after only one season in the Scottish Championship. Their relegation was confirmed on the final day of the season with a 2–1 away defeat to Raith Rovers.

== Results and fixtures ==
Win Draw Loss Postponed

=== Pre-season and friendlies ===
2 July 2016	Stenhousemuir	0 – 2	Ayr United	Ochilview Park, Stenhousemuir
14:00		Report

==== Raydale Cup ====
10 July 2016 Semi-final	Ayr United	0 – 2	South Shields	Raydale Park, Gretna
		Ayr United	Arca 39'; Scroggins 41'

11 July 2016 3rd place play-off	Gretna 2008	0 – 8	Ayr United	Raydale Park, Gretna
14:00		Ayr United	Thomas 14', 62' (pen.); McCreadie 60'; McGuffie 65'; Forrest 71', 90'; Donald 79'; Crawford 82'

=== Scottish Championship ===
6 August 2016 1	Ayr United	0 – 2	Raith Rovers	Somerset Park, Ayr
15:00		Report	Callachan 19'; Matthews 75'	Attendance: 1,550; Referee: Euan Anderson

13 August 2016 2	Queen of the South	4 – 1	Ayr United	Palmerston Park, Dumfries
15:00	Lyle 12', 53'; Dobbie 44'; Dykes 74'	Report	Nisbet 61'	Attendance: 1,982; Referee: Stephen Finnie

20 August 2016 3	Dundee United	3 – 0	Ayr United	Tannadice Park, Dundee
15:00	Murray 13'; Robson 37'; Flood 76'	Report		Attendance: 6,427; Referee: Greg Aitken

27 August 2016 4	Ayr United	1 – 1	St Mirren	Somerset Park, Ayr
15:00	Adams 14'	Report	Walsh 89'	Attendance: 2,165; Referee: Crawford Allan

10 September 2016 5	Ayr United	2 – 1	Greenock Morton	Somerset Park, Ayr
15:00	Cairney 47'; Forrest 69'	Report	Forbes 86'	Attendance: 1,441; Referee: John McKendrick

17 September 2016 6	Hibernian	1 – 2	Ayr United	Easter Road, Edinburgh
15:00	Cummings 50'; Bartley (red card) 67'	Report	Balatoni 74'; Gilmour 80'	Attendance: 15,056; Referee: Nick Walsh

24 September 2016 7	Falkirk	2 – 0	Ayr United	Falkirk Stadium, Falkirk
15:00	Meggatt 78' (o.g.); Miller 90+1'	Report		Attendance: 4,345; Referee: Willie Collum

1 October 2016 8	Ayr United	0 – 0	Dunfermline Athletic	Somerset Park, Ayr
15:00		Report		Attendance: 2,883; Referee: Don Robertson

15 October 2016 9	Dumbarton	0 – 3	Ayr United	Dumbarton Football Stadium, Dumbarton
15:00		Report	Forrest 2', 50', 62' (pen.)	Attendance: 1,005; Referee: Gavin Duncan

22 October 2016 10	Ayr United	1 – 0	Queen of the South	Somerset Park, Ayr
15:00	Cairney 52'	Report		Attendance: 1,842; Referee: John Beaton

29 October 2016 11	Greenock Morton	2 – 1	Ayr United	Cappielow, Greenock
15:00	O'Ware 73'; Oliver 89'	Report	Nisbet 37'	Attendance: 1,859; Referee: Mat Northcroft

5 November 2016 12	Ayr United	0 – 3	Hibernian	Somerset Park, Ayr
15:00		Report	Boyle 28', 77'; McGinn 84'	Attendance: 3,100; Referee: Kevin Clancy

19 November 2016 13	Ayr United	0 – 1	Falkirk	Somerset Park, Ayr
15:00		Report	Craigen 15'	Attendance: 1,414; Referee: Gavin Duncan

22 November 2016 14	Raith Rovers	1 – 1	Ayr United	Stark's Park, Kirkcaldy
19:45	Coustrain 17'; Benedictus (red card) 36'	Report	Cairney (red card) 57'; Harkins 88'	Attendance: 1,241; Referee: Craig Charleston

3 December 2016 15	Dunfermline Athletic	1 – 1	Ayr United	East End Park, Dunfermline
15:00	Clark 30'; Martin (red card) 48'	Report	Forrest 50' (pen.)	Attendance: 3,250; Referee: Barry Cook

10 December 2016 16	Ayr United	0 – 1	Dundee United	Somerset Park, Ayr
15:00		Report	Obadeyi 6'	Attendance: 2,049; Referee: Willie Collum

17 December 2016 17	St Mirren	1 – 1	Ayr United	St Mirren Park, Paisley
15:00	Sutton 81'	Report	Cairney 63'; Adams (red card) 77'	Attendance: 3,124; Referee: Greg Aitken

24 December 2016 18	Ayr United	4 – 4	Dumbarton	Somerset Park, Ayr
12:30	McKenna 31'; Harkins 43'; Forest 74' (pen.); Cairney 85'	Report	R. Thomson 45+2'; Harvie 52'; Stirling (red card) 73'; J. Thomson 84'; Stevenson 88'	Attendance: 1,441; Referee: Craig Charleston

31 December 2016 19	Queen of the South	0 – 0	Ayr United	Palmerston Park, Dumfries
14:00		Report		Attendance: 1,594; Referee: Steven Kirkland

7 January 2017 20	Ayr United	0 – 2	Dunfermline Athletic	Somerset Park, Ayr
15:00		Report	Clark 26'; Geggan 33'	Attendance: 2,261; Referee: Craig Thomson

14 January 2017 21	Falkirk	1 – 1	Ayr United	Falkirk Stadium, Falkirk
15:00	Grant 45+2'	Report	Harkins 24'	Attendance: 5,038; Referee: Bobby Madden

28 January 2017 22	Ayr United	1 – 4	Greenock Morton	Somerset Park, Ayr
15:00	Adams 36'	Report	Forbes 11', 19'; Oliver 31', 65'	Attendance: 1,576; Referee: Don Robertson

4 February 2017 23	Hibernian	1 – 1	Ayr United	Easter Road, Edinburgh
15:00	Cummings 74'	Report	Crawford 4'	Attendance: 14,349; Referee: Crawford Allan

18 February 2017 24	Dumbarton	2 – 2	Ayr United	Dumbarton Football Stadium, Dumbarton
15:00	Stanton 62', 75'	Report	Docherty (red card) 27'; Rose 90+1'; Moore 90+3' (pen.)	Attendance: 1,198; Referee: John McKendrick

25 February 2017 25	Ayr United	0 – 2	St Mirren	Somerset Park, Ayr
15:00		Report	Sutton 51'; Morgan 82'	Attendance: 2,712; Referee: Craig Thomson

28 February 2017 26	Ayr United	1 – 0	Raith Rovers	Somerset Park, Ayr
19:45	El Alagui 62'	Report		Attendance: 1,103; Referee: Willie Collum

11 March 2017 27	Ayr United	1 – 4	Falkirk	Somerset Park, Ayr
15:00	Harkins 64'	Report	Austin 8', 63'; Sibbald 90'; Aird 90+2'	Attendance: 1,614; Referee: Steven McLean

18 March 2017 28	Dunfermline Athletic	0 – 1	Ayr United	East End Park, Dunfermline
15:00		Report	Docherty 49'	Attendance: 3,276; Referee: Bobby Madden

25 March 2017 29	Ayr United	2 – 1	Dumbarton	Somerset Park, Ayr
15:00	El Alagui 45+1'; Crawford 51'	Report	R. Thomson 21'; Fleming (red card) 71'	Attendance: 1,608; Referee: Craig Charleston

28 March 2017 30	Dundee United	2 – 1	Ayr United	Tannadice Park, Dundee
19:45	Murray 23'; Durnan 78'	Report	Harkins 51' (pen.)	Attendance: 4,661; Referee: Barry Cook

1 April 2017 31	St Mirren	6 – 2	Ayr United	St Mirren Park, Paisley
15:00	Mallan 5'; MacKenzie 20'; McGinn 23'; Magennis 36'; Morgan 52'; Smith 88'	Report	Cairney 74'; El Alagu 87'	Attendance: 4,620; Referee: Gavin Duncan

8 April 2017 32	Ayr United	0 – 2	Queen of the South	Somerset Park, Ayr
15:00		Report	Dobbie 71', 76'	Attendance: 1,476; Referee: Alan Newlands

15 April 2017 33	Ayr United	0 – 0	Dundee United	Somerset Park, Ayr
17:15		Report		Attendance: 1,205; Referee: Crawford Allan

22 April 2017 34	Greenock Morton	1 – 1	Ayr United	Cappielow, Greenock
15:00	Shankland 38'	Report	Moore 45+1'	Attendance: 2,390; Referee: Steven Kirkland

29 April 2017 35	Ayr United	0 – 4	Hibernian	Somerset Park, Ayr
15:00		Report	Cummings 27', 72'; Boyle 30'; Keatings 66'	Attendance: 2,152; Referee: Stephen Finnie

6 May 2017 36	Raith Rovers	2 – 1	Ayr United	Stark's Park, Kirkcaldy
15:00	Penska (red card) 4'; Court 37'; McManus 90'	Report	Docherty 70'	Attendance: 3,064; Referee: Steven McLean

=== Scottish League Cup ===
==== Group stage ====
Results

16 July 2016 Group G	Ayr United	2 – 1	Hamilton Academical	Somerset Park, Ayr
15:00	Forrest 2' (pen.); Crawford 49'	Report	Longridge 90+4'	Attendance: 994; Referee: Willie Collum

19 July 2016 Group G	St Mirren	1 – 0	Ayr United	St Mirren Park, Paisley
19:45	Baird 90+3'	SPFL Report		Attendance: 2,098; Referee: John Beaton

23 July 2016 Group G	Ayr United	1 – 0	Edinburgh City	Somerset Park, Ayr
15:00	Gilmour 11'	Report		Attendance: 862; Referee: Barry Cook

26 July 2016 Group G	Livingston	0 – 2	Ayr United	Almondvale, Livingston
19:45		Report	Murphy 19'; McGuffie 78'	Attendance: 643; Referee: David Lowe

==== Knockout phase ====
10 August 2016 Second round	Ayr United	1 – 2	Aberdeen	Somerset Park, Ayr
19:45	Forrest 41'	Report	Meggatt 3' (o.g.); McGinn 30'	Attendance: 2,653; Referee: Alan Muir

=== Scottish Challenge Cup ===
4 September 2016 Third round	Ayr United	3 – 2 (a.e.t.)	Airdrieonians	Somerset Park, Ayr
15:00	McGuffie 35'; Forrest 45'; Balatoni 97'	Report	Conroy 14'; Balatoni 49' (o.g.); Russell (red card) 113'	Attendance: 1,135; Referee: Barry Cook

7 October 2016 Fourth round	Ayr United	1 – 0 (a.e.t.)	Falkirk	Somerset Park, Ayr
19:45	Harkins 114'	Report		Attendance: 1,247; Referee: Alan Muir

13 November 2016 Quarter-final	St Mirren	2 – 1	Ayr United	St Mirren Park, Paisley
15:00	Sutton 83', 85'	Report	O'Connell 68'	Attendance: 2,199; Referee: Crawford Allan

=== Scottish Cup ===
29 November 2016 Third round	Brechin City	0 – 1	Ayr United	Glebe Park, Brechin
19:45		Report	O'Connell 70'	Attendance: 308; Referee: Alan Muir

21 January 2017 Fourth round	Ayr United	0 – 0	Queen's Park	Somerset Park, Ayr
15:00		Report		Attendance: 1,326; Referee: Barry Cook

24 January 2017 Fourth round reply	Queen's Park	2 – 2 (a.e.t.) (4 – 5 p)	Ayr United	Hampden Park
19:45	Woods 4'; Bryan Wharton 32'; Burns (red card) 97'	Report	Moore 26'; Cairney; Balatoni 83'	Attendance: 1,026; Referee: Barry Cook

11 February 2017 Fifth round	Ayr United	1 – 1	Clyde	Somerset Park, Ayr
15:00	Cairney 70'	Report	Gormley 55'	Attendance: 1,554; Referee: Stephen Finnie

14 February 2017 Fifth round replay	Clyde	1 – 2 (a.e.t.)	Ayr United	Broadwood Stadium
19:45	Gormley 88'	Report	McDaid 11'; Wardrope 117'	Attendance: 965; Referee: Stephen Finnie

4 March 2017 Quarter-final	Hibernian	3 – 1	Ayr United	Easter Road Stadium
15:00	McGinn 7'; Cummings 12' (pen.); Keatings 79'	Report	McGuffie 33'; McKenna (red card) 45'	Attendance: 13,602; Referee: Nick Walsh

== Player statistics ==
As of 6 May 2017

No.	Pos	Nat	Player	Total		Championship		League Cup		Challenge Cup		Scottish Cup	
No.	Pos	Nat	Player	Apps	Goals	Apps	Goals	Apps	Goals	Apps	Goals	Apps	Goals
1	GK	(Scotland) SCO	Greg Fleming	49	0	36	0	4	0	3	0	6	0
2	DF	(Scotland) SCO	Nicky Devlin	48	0	34	0	5	0	3	0	6	0
3	DF	(Scotland) SCO	Patrick Boyle	41	0	26+3	0	5	0	2	0	5	0
4	DF	(Scotland) SCO	Brian Gilmour	37	2	19+6	1	2+2	1	2	0	4+2	0
5	DF	(Scotland) SCO	Michael Rose	24	1	10+10	1	0	0	0	0	0+4	0
6	DF	(Republic of Ireland) IRL	Peter Murphy	39	1	29+1	0	5	1	1	0	2+1	0
8	DF	(Scotland) SCO	Robbie Crawford	37	3	24+3	2	5	1	1+1	0	3	0
9	DF	(Scotland) SCO	Craig Moore	17	3	9+4	2	1	0	0	0	3	1
10	MF	(Scotland) SCO	Alan Forrest	45	9	24+10	6	2	2	3	1	1+5	0
11	MF	(Scotland) SCO	Declan McDaid	9	1	2+5	0	0	0	0	0	2	1
12	MF	(Scotland) SCO	Gary Harkins	40	6	30+2	5	0	0	2	1	6	0
14	MF	(Scotland) SCO	Paul Cairney	42	6	27+3	5	4+1	0	2+1	0	3+1	1
15	FW	(France) FRA	Farid El Alagui	11	3	8+3	3	0	0	0	0	0	0
16	MF	(Scotland) SCO	Jamie Adams	25	2	16+2	2	4	0	0	0	2+1	0
17	FW	(Scotland) SCO	Kevin Nisbet	20	2	11+9	2	0	0	0	0	0	0
18	DF	(Scotland) SCO	Daryll Meggatt	43	0	31	0	5	0	2+1	0	4	0
19	GK	(Scotland) SCO	Jordan Hart	2	0	0+1	0	1	0	0	0	0	0
20	MF	(Scotland) SCO	Michael Wardrope	11	1	2+3	0	0+3	0	1	0	0+2	1
21	MF	(Scotland) SCO	Craig McGuffie	40	3	6+20	0	2+3	1	3	1	3+3	1
22	DF	(England) ENG	Conrad Balatoni	39	3	30	1	0	0	3	1	6	1
23	MF	(Scotland) SCO	Ross Docherty	42	2	29	2	4	0	3	0	6	0
26	DF	(Scotland) SCO	Scott McKenna	14	1	11	1	0	0	1	0	2	0
Players who left the club during the 2016–17 season
7	FW	(Wales) WAL	Jamie Thomas	7	0	0+3	0	3	0	1	0	0	0
11	MF	(Scotland) SCO	Michael Donald	13	0	1+5	0	2+1	0	0+3	0	1	0
15	MF	(Republic of Ireland) IRL	Andy O'Connell	15	2	1+7	0	1+2	0	0+3	1	1	1
17	FW	(Scotland) SCO	Sean McKenzie	1	0	0	0	0	0	0	0	0+1	0
22	DF	(Scotland) SCO	Craig McCracken	0	0	0	0	0	0	0	0	0	0
25	DF	(Scotland) SCO	Andy Johnston	0	0	0	0	0	0	0	0	0	0

== Team statistics ==
=== League table ===
Pos	Team	Pld	W	D	L	GF	GA	GD	Pts	Promotion, qualification or relegation
6	Queen of the South	36	11	10	15	46	52	−6	43	
7	St Mirren	36	9	12	15	52	56	−4	39	
8	Dumbarton	36	9	12	15	46	56	−10	39	
9	Raith Rovers (R)	36	10	9	17	35	52	−17	39	Qualification for the Championship play-offs
10	Ayr United (R)	36	7	12	17	33	62	−29	33	Relegation to League One

Source: Soccerway
Rules for classification: 1) Points; 2) Goal difference; 3) Number of goals scored
(R) Relegated

=== Division summary ===
Round	1	2	3	4	5	6	7	8	9	10	11	12	13	14	15	16	17	18	19	20	21	22	23	24	25	26	27	28	29	30	31	32	33	34	35	36
Ground	H	A	A	H	H	A	A	H	A	H	A	H	A	H	A	H	A	H	A	H	A	H	A	A	H	H	A	H	A	H	A	H	H	A	H	A
Result	L	L	L	D	W	W	L	D	W	W	L	L	L	D	D	L	D	D	D	L	D	L	D	D	L	W	L	L	W	W	L	L	D	D	L	L
Position	10	10	10	10	7	6	6	7	7	6	7	7	7	7	7	8	9	9	9	9	9	9	9	9	9	9	9	9	9	9	9	10	10	10	10	10

Updated to match(es) played on 6 May 2017. Source:
A = Away; H = Home; W = Win; D = Draw; L = Loss

=== League Cup table ===
Pos	Team	Pld	W	PW	PL	L	GF	GA	GD	Pts	Qualification	HAM	AYR	STM	LIV	EDI
1	Hamilton Academical (Q)	4	3	0	0	1	10	5	+5	9	Qualification for the Second Round	—	—	3–0	2–1	—
2	Ayr United (Q)	4	3	0	0	1	5	2	+3	9	Qualification for the Second Round	2–1	—	—	—	1–0
3	St Mirren	4	3	0	0	1	7	5	+2	9		—	1–0	—	—	3–0
4	Livingston	4	1	0	0	3	6	7	−1	3		—	0–2	2–3	—	—
5	Edinburgh City	4	0	0	0	4	2	11	−9	0		2–4	—	—	0–3	—

Source: SPFL
(Q) Qualified to the phase indicated

== Transfers ==
=== Players in ===
Player	From	Fee
(Scotland) Paul Cairney	(Scotland) Stranraer	Free
(Scotland) Michael Rose	(Scotland) Aberdeen	Free
(Scotland) Daryll Meggatt	(Scotland) Dundee	Free
(Republic of Ireland) Andy O’Connell	(Republic of Ireland) Cork City	Free
(Scotland) Jordan Hart	(Scotland) Annan Athletic	Free
(Wales) Jamie Thomas	(England) Burnley	Loan
(Scotland) Craig Moore	(Scotland) Motherwell	Loan
(Scotland) Kevin Nisbet	(Scotland) Partick Thistle	Loan
(Scotland) Gary Harkins	(Scotland) Dundee	Free
(England) Conrad Balatoni	(Scotland) Kilmarnock	Free
(Scotland) Scott McKenna	(Scotland) Aberdeen	Loan
(Scotland) Declan McDaid	(Scotland) Partick Thistle	Free
(France) Farid El Alagui	(Scotland) Dunfermline Athletic	Free

=== Players out ===
Player	To	Fee
(Scotland) Andy Graham	(Scotland) Alloa Athletic	Free
(Scotland) Ryan Stevenson	(Scotland) Dumbarton	Free
(Scotland) Alan Trouten	(Scotland) Brechin City	Free
(Scotland) Gerry McLauchlan	(Scotland) Cowdenbeath	Free
(Scotland) Jordan Preston	(England) Guiseley	Free
(Scotland) Craig McCracken	(Scotland) Auchinleck Talbot	Free
(Scotland) Scott McKenzie	(Scotland) Cumnock Juniors	Free
(Republic of Ireland) Andy O’Connell	Free Agent	Free
(Scotland) Andy Johnston	(Scotland) Stranraer	Free
(Scotland) Michael Donald	(Scotland) Stranraer	Free
