= 2013–14 Ayr United F.C. season =

Ayr United
2013–14 season
- Chairman: Lachlan Cameron
- Manager: Mark Roberts
- Stadium: Somerset Park
- League One: Fourth place
- Challenge Cup: Second round
- League Cup: First round
- Scottish Cup: Fourth round
- Top goalscorer: League: Michael Moffat (25); All: Michael Moffat (26)
- Highest home attendance: 8,968 vs Rangers, League One, 6 October 2013
- Lowest home attendance: 643 vs Dunfermline Athletic, League One, 14 December 2013
| Home colours | Away colours |

The 2013–14 season is the 104th season of competitive football by Ayr United, their first season in the newly formed Scottish League One and their second consecutive season in the third tier of Scottish football. Ayr also competed in the Challenge Cup, League Cup and the Scottish Cup

Ayr finished in fourth place in League One and qualified for the Scottish Championship play-offs, losing 5-2 on aggregate to Cowdenbeath. Ayr also reached the Second round of the Challenge Cup, the First round of the League Cup and the Fourth round of the Scottish Cup.

== Results and fixtures ==
Win Draw Loss Postponed

=== Pre–season ===
| 5 July 2013 | (Slovakia) Oțelul Galați | 2 – 0 | Ayr United | Leigh Sports Village, Leigh |
| 18:00 | Băjenaru 15'; Paraschiv 74' | Report | | Attendance: 0 Referee: Mark Halsey |

| 7 July 2013 | (Romania) Dinamo București | 1 – 1 | Ayr United | Leigh Sports Village, Leigh |
| 18:00 | Abdoulaye 65' | Report | Malcolm 59' | Attendance: 0 |

| 9 July 2013 | Queen's Park | 0 – 3 | Ayr United | Lesser Hampden, Glasgow |
| 19:30 | | | Malcolm 10'; Shankland 60'; Wardrope 90' | Attendance: 0 |

| 13 July 2013 | Ayr United | 1 – 4 | (England) Rotherham United | Somerset Park, Ayr |
| 15:00 | Moffat 86' (pen.) | Report; Rotherham United Report | Revell 52', 58'; Rose 68'; Pringle 89' | Attendance: 664 |

| 21 July 2013 | Cumnock Juniors | 0 – 5 | Ayr United | Townhead Park, Cumnock |
| 12:00 | | | Donald 24'; Forrest 30'; Moffat 75' (pen.); Marenghi 77'; McGowan 90' |

| 29 July 2013 | Ayr United | 0 – 2 | (Cyprus) AEL Limassol | Somerset Park, Ayr |
| 19:30 | | | Sá 10'; Targino 23' | Attendance: 461 |

=== Scottish League One ===
| 10 August 2013 1 | Arbroath | 0 – 3 | Ayr United | Gayfield Park, Arbroath |
| 15:00 | | Report | Moffat 13', 17'; Forrest 62' | Attendance: 775; Referee: John McKendrick |

| 17 August 2013 2 | Ayr United | 2 – 0 | Forfar Athletic | Somerset Park, Ayr |
| 15:00 | Malcolm 41'; Moffat 75' (pen.) | Report | | Attendance: 1,056; Referee: Matt Northcroft |

| 24 August 2013 3 | Stranraer | 1 – 1 | Ayr United | Stair Park, Stranraer |
| 15:00 | Longworth 8' | Report | McGowan 37' | Attendance: 845; Referee: Des Roache |

| 31 August 2013 4 | Ayr United | 2 – 2 | Airdrieonians | Somerset Park, Ayr |
| 15:00 | Moffat 12', 17' | Report | Boyle 4'; Blockley 37' | Attendance: 1,339; Referee: Andrew Dallas |

| 14 September 2013 5 | Stenhousemuir | 1 – 1 | Ayr United | Ochilview Park, Stenhousemuir |
| 15:00 | Roberts 42' | Report | Smith 71' | Attendance: 657; Referee: Iain Brines |

| 21 September 2013 6 | Ayr United | 2 – 2 | Brechin City | Somerset Park, Ayr |
| 15:00 | Moffat 43'; McGowan 45' | Report | Trouten 68'; McLean 90' | Attendance: 987; Referee: Don Robertson |

| 21 September 2013 7 | Dunfermline Athletic | 5 – 1 | Ayr United | East End Park, Dunfermline |
| 15:00 | Wallace 21' (pen.), 65'; Whittle 31'; Geggan 39'; Falkingham 41' | Report | Moffat 3' | Attendance: 2,743; Referee: George Salmond |

| 6 October 2013 8 | Ayr United | 0 – 2 | Rangers | Somerset Park, Ayr |
| 15:00 | | Report | Mohsni 56'; MacLeod 59' | Attendance: 8,968; Referee: Bobby Madden |

| 12 October 2013 9 | East Fife | 1 – 4 | Ayr United | Bayview Stadium, Methil |
| 15:00 | Buchanan 43' (pen.) | Report | Donald 29', 90'; Moffat 36'; McLaughlin 53' | Attendance: 753; Referee: Iain Brines |

| 19 October 2013 10 | Ayr United | 2 – 0 | Arbroath | Somerset Park, Ayr |
| 15:00 | Kyle 45'; Hunter 74' | Report | | Attendance: 990; Referee: Stevie O'Reilly |

| 26 October 2013 11 | Airdrieonians | 0 – 1 | Ayr United | Excelsior Stadium, Airdrie |
| 15:00 | | Report | Marenghi 53' | Attendance: 1,012; Referee: Kevin Graham |

| 12 November 2013 12 | Ayr United | 3 – 6 | Stranraer | Somerset Park, Ayr |
| 19:45 | Moffat 15', 17', 57' (pen.) | Report | Longworth 11', 24', 41'; Aitken 48' (pen.), 86' (pen.); McKenna 77' | Attendance: 986; Referee: Andrew Dallas |

| 16 November 2013 13 | Brechin City | 1 – 1 | Ayr United | Glebe Park, Brechin |
| 15:00 | Jackson 75' | Report | Marenghi 44' | Attendance: 518; Referee: Alan Muir |

| 23 November 2013 14 | Ayr United | 4 – 3 | Stenhousemuir | Somerset Park, Ayr |
| 15:00 | Moffat 5' (pen.), 72' (pen.); Donald 33'; Kyle 85' | Report | Gemmell 14' (pen.); Dickson 19'; McNeil 59' | Attendance: 986; Referee: Calum Murray |

| 7 December 2013 15 | Rangers | 3 – 0 | Ayr United | Ibrox Stadium, Glasgow |
| 15:00 | Daly 12'; Aird 23'; Mohsni 86' | Report | | Attendance: 45,227; Referee: Euan Anderson |

| 14 December 2013 16 | Ayr United | 2 – 4 | Dunfermline Athletic | Somerset Park, Ayr |
| 15:00 | Gilmour 17'; Moffat 27' | Report | Husband 44'; Wallace 60' (pen.), 69'; Moore 90' | Attendance: 643; Referee: Stevie O'Reilly |

| 21 December 2013 17 | Forfar Athletic | 0 – 1 | Ayr United | Station Park, Forfar |
| 15:00 | | Report | Kyle 62' | Attendance: 473; Referee: Don Robertson |

| 28 December 2013 18 | Ayr United | 2 – 0 | East Fife | Somerset Park, Ayr |
| 15:00 | Moffat 32', 68' | Report | | Attendance: 1,059; Referee: Des Roache |

| 4 January 2014 19 | Stranraer | 4 – 0 | Ayr United | Stair Park, Stranraer |
| 15:00 | Winter 14'; Grehan 33' (pen.), 47'; Stirling 49' | Report | | Attendance: 1,097; Referee: Crawford Allan |

| 11 January 2014 20 | Ayr United | 3 – 0 | Airdrieonians | Somerset Park, Ayr |
| 15:00 | Gilmour (yellow card) 40'; Kyle 59'; Moffat 76'; Forrest 79' | Report | | Attendance: 1,037; Referee: Euan Anderson |

| 18 January 2014 21 | Ayr United | 1 – 3 | Brechin City | Somerset Park, Ayr |
| 15:00 | Pope 79'; Moffat (yellow card) 88' | Report | McLauchlan 12'; McAusland 33' (o.g.); Hay 90+2' (pen.) | Attendance: 1,018; Referee: Alan Muir |

| 25 January 2014 22 | Stenhousemuir | 1 – 1 | Ayr United | Ochilview Park, Stenhousemuir |
| 15:00 | McNeil 89' | Report | Malcolm 27'; Donald (yellow card) 72' | Attendance: 467; Referee: John McKendrick |

| 1 February 2014 23 | Arbroath | 2 – 3 | Ayr United | Gayfield Park, Arbroath |
| 15:00 | Paul Sheerin (yellow card) 7'; Linn 63'; Chisholm (yellow card) 65'; McIntosh 79' | Report | Moffat 4', 29'; Donald 18'; Malcolm (yellow card) 23' | Attendance: 605; Referee: Matt Northcroft |

| 15 February 2014 24 | Ayr United | 0 – 2 | Rangers | Somerset Park, Ayr |
| 15:00 | | Report | Law 46'; Daly 59' | Attendance: 8,449; Referee: John McKendrick |

| 22 February 2014 25 | Dunfermline Athletic | 3 – 0 | Ayr United | East End Park, Dunfermline |
| 15:00 | Forbes 8'; Shankland 45+1', 78' | Report | | Attendance: 2,773; Referee: George Salmond |

| 1 March 2014 26 | Airdrieonians | 3 – 0 | Ayr United | Excelsior Stadium, Airdrie |
| 15:00 | Barr 30'; Watt 69'; Parker 75' (pen.) | Report | Hunter (red card) 41'; McAusland (red card) 74' | Attendance: 880; Referee: David Somers |

| 4 March 2014 27 | Ayr United | 2 – 3 | Forfar Athletic | Somerset Park, Ayr |
| 15:00 | Malcolm 34'; Campbell 62' | Report | Swankie 13', 67'; Templeman 45' | Attendance: 656; Referee: Craig Charleston |

| 8 March 2014 28 | Ayr United | 5 – 0 | Stranraer | Somerset Park, Ayr |
| 15:00 | Moffat 8' (pen.), 59'; Malcolm 20'; Donald 30'; Forrest 76' | Report | McKeown (red card) 61' | Attendance: 1,141; Referee: Brian Colvin |

| 15 March 2014 29 | East Fife | 0 – 5 | Ayr United | Bayview Stadium, Methil |
| 15:00 | | Report | Moffat 36' (pen.), 39'; Kyle 45+1'; Donald 51'; Forrest 90+1' | Attendance: 647; Referee: Euan Norris |

| 22 March 2014 30 | Ayr United | 2 – 1 | Arbroath | Somerset Park, Ayr |
| 15:00 | Malcolm 4'; Donald (red card) 22'; Moffat 40' | Report | Deuchar 38' | Attendance: 766; Referee: Greg Aitken |

| 29 March 2014 31 | Ayr United | 2 – 3 | Stenhousemuir | Somerset Park, Ayr |
| 15:00 | Moffat 66'; Forrest 68' | Report | Greenhalgh 20'; Higgins 87' (pen.), 90+1' | Attendance: 766; Referee: Greg Aitken |

| 5 April 2014 32 | Brechin City | 2 – 1 | Ayr United | Glebe Park, Brechin |
| 15:00 | Thomson 6'; Molloy 67' | Report | Forrest 75' | Attendance: 507; Referee: Brian Colvin |

| 19 April 2014 33 | Ayr United | 1 – 1 | Dunfermline Athletic | Somerset Park, Ayr |
| 15:00 | Forrest 55' | Report | Thomson 50' | Attendance: 1,272; Referee: Stephen Finnie |

| 22 April 2014 34 | Rangers | 2 – 1 | Ayr United | Ibrox Stadium, Glasgow |
| 15:00 | Mohsni 54', 82' | Report | Forrest 69' | Attendance: 40,651; Referee: Iain Brines |

| 26 April 2014 35 | Forfar Athletic | 4 – 2 | Ayr United | Station Park, Forfar |
| 15:00 | McLuskey 2'; Hilson 25', 73'; Kader 52' | Report | Moffat 60' (pen.); Gilmour 90+2' | Attendance: 532; Referee: Euan Anderson |

| 3 May 2014 36 | Ayr United | 4 – 1 | East Fife | Somerset Park, Ayr |
| 15:00 | Malcolm 42', 53', 63'; Gilmour 75' | Report | Buchanan 82' | Attendance: 1,952; Referee: Crawford Allan |

=== Championship play-off ===
| 7 May 2014 Semi-Final 1st Leg | Ayr United | 1 – 2 | Cowdenbeath | Somerset Park, Ayr |
| | Pope 79' | Report | Stewart 15', 37' | Attendance: 1,495; Referee: Don Robertson |

| 10 May 2014 Semi-Final 2nd Leg | Cowdenbeath | 3 – 1 (5 – 2 agg.) | Ayr United | Central Park, Cowdenbeath |
| | Stewart 1', 30'; O'Brien 52' | Report | Donald 35' | Attendance: 933; Referee: John Beaton |

=== Scottish Challenge Cup ===
| 27 July 2013 First Round | Queens Park | 1 – 2 | Ayr United | Hampden Park, Glasgow |
| 15:00 | Quinn 28' (pen.) | Report | Moffat 53'; Forrest 89' | Attendance: 887; Referee: Paul Robertson |

| 20 August 2013 Second Round | Ayr United | 1 – 2 (a.e.t.) | Falkirk | Somerset Park, Ayr |
| 19:45 | Malcolm 39' | | Loy 63'; Shepherd 110' | Attendance: 1,050; Referee: Craig Charleston |

=== Scottish League Cup ===
| 6 August 2013 First Round | Partick Thistle | 2 – 1 | Ayr United | Firhill Stadium, Glasgow |
| 19:45 | O'Donnell 12'; Balatoni 75' | Report | Shankland 89' | Attendance: 2,145; Referee: Iain Brines |

=== Scottish Cup ===
| 3 November 2013 Third Round | Ayr United | 3 – 2 | Queen's Park | Somerset Park, Ayr |
| 15:00 | Marenghi 39'; Lithgow 50'; Malcolm 60' | Report | Brough 27'; Spittal 67' | Attendance: 879; Referee: Euan Anderson |

| 30 November 2013 Fourth Round | Ayr United | 1 – 1 | Dunfermline Athletic | Somerset Park, Ayr |
| 15:00 | Donald 59' | Report | Geggan 14' | Attendance: 1,391; Referee: Stephen Finnie |

| 4 December 2013 Fourth Round Replay | Dunfermline Athletic | 1 – 0 | Ayr United | East End Park, Dunfermline |
| 19:45 | Thomson 60' | Report | | Attendance: 1,932; Referee: Stephen Finnie |

== Player statistics ==
=== Squad, appearance and goals ===
As of 3 May 2014

| No. | Nat | Player | Total | | League | | Scottish Cup | | League Cup | | Other | |
| No. | Nat | Player | Apps | Goals | Apps | Goals | Apps | Goals | Apps | Goals | Apps | Goals |
Goalkeepers
| | (Scotland) | David Hutton | 43 | 0 | 36 | 0 | 3 | 0 | 1 | 0 | 3 | 0 |
| | (Scotland) | William Muir | 0 | 0 | 0 | 0 | 0 | 0 | 0 | 0 | 0 | 0 |
| | (Scotland) | Shaun Newman | 0 | 0 | 0 | 0 | 0 | 0 | 0 | 0 | 0 | 0 |
Defenders
| | (Scotland) | Martyn Campbell | 21 (1) | 1 | 18 (1) | 1 | 0 | 0 | 1 | 0 | 1 | 0 |
| | (Scotland) | Adam Hunter | 36 | 1 | 28 (1) | 1 | 0 | 3 | 1 | 0 | 3 | 0 |
| | (Scotland) | Alan Lithgow | 41 | 1 | 34 | 1 | 3 | 1 | 1 | 0 | 3 | 0 |
| | (Scotland) | Jackson Longridge | 4 | 0 | 2 (2) | 0 | 0 | 0 | 0 | 1 | 0 | 0 |
| | (Scotland) | Josh McArthur | 2 | 0 | 1 | 0 | 0 | 0 | 0 (1) | 0 | 0 | 0 |
| | (Scotland) | Kyle McAusland | 19 | 0 | 12 (5) | 0 | 0 | 0 | 0 | 0 | 2 | 0 |
| | (Scotland) | Gordon Pope | 39 | 2 | 32 | 1 | 3 | 0 | 1 | 0 | 3 | 1 |
Midfielders
| | (Scotland) | Robbie Crawford | 19 | 0 | 12 (3) | 0 | 3 | 0 | 0 | 0 | 1 | 0 |
| | (Scotland) | Michael Donald | 40 | 8 | 34 | 6 | 3 | 1 | 1 | 0 | 2 | 1 |
| | (Scotland) | Alan Forrest | 32 | 9 | 11 (16) | 8 | 0 (2) | 0 | 0 (1) | 0 | 1 (2) | 1 |
| | (Scotland) | Brian Gilmour | 28 | 3 | 21 (1) | 3 | 2 | 0 | 2 | 0 | 2 | 0 |
| | (Scotland) | Anthony Marenghi | 26 | 3 | 16 (5) | 2 | 3 | 1 | 1 | 0 | 1 | 0 |
| | (Scotland) | Michael McGowan | 28 | 2 | 17 (7) | 2 | 0 (1) | 0 | 1 | 0 | 1 (1) | 0 |
| | (Scotland) | Scott McLaughlin | 42 | 1 | 35 | 1 | 3 | 0 | 1 | 0 | 3 | 0 |
| | (Scotland) | Michael Wardrope | 1 | 0 | 0 (1) | 0 | 0 | 0 | 0 | 0 | 0 | 0 |
Forwards
| | (Scotland) | Kevin Kyle | 29 | 5 | 22 (2) | 5 | 2 (1) | 0 | 0 | 0 | 1 (1) | 0 |
| | (Scotland) | Craig Malcolm | 39 | 9 | 28 (5) | 8 | 1 (1) | 1 | 1 | 0 | 3 | 0 |
| | (Scotland) | Michael Moffat | 37 | 26 | 32 | 25 | 3 | 0 | 1 | 0 | 3 | 1 |
| | (Scotland) | Mark Roberts | 8 | 0 | 5 (2) | 0 | 1 | 0 | 0 | 0 | 0 | 0 |

== Club statistics ==
=== League table ===
| Pos | Team | Pld | W | D | L | GF | GA | GD | Pts | Qualification or relegation |
|---|---|---|---|---|---|---|---|---|---|---|
| 2 | Dunfermline Athletic | 36 | 19 | 6 | 11 | 68 | 54 | +14 | 63 | Qualification for the Championship play-offs |
| 3 | Stranraer | 36 | 14 | 9 | 13 | 57 | 57 | 0 | 51 | Qualification for the Championship play-offs |
| 4 | Ayr United | 36 | 14 | 7 | 15 | 65 | 66 | −1 | 49 | Qualification for the Championship play-offs |
| 5 | Stenhousemuir | 36 | 12 | 12 | 12 | 57 | 66 | −9 | 48 | |
| 6 | Airdrieonians | 36 | 12 | 9 | 15 | 47 | 57 | −10 | 45 | |

Source: SPFL
Rules for classification: 1) points; 2) goal difference; 3) number of goals scored.

== Transfers ==
=== Players In ===
| Player | From | Fee |
|---|---|---|
| (Scotland) Craig Malcolm | (Scotland) Stranraer | Free |
| (Scotland) Alan Lithgow | (Scotland) Dumbarton | Free |
| (Scotland) Gordon Pope | (Scotland) Auchinleck Talbot | Undisclosed |
| (Scotland) Scott McLaughlin | (Scotland) Peterhead | Free |
| (Scotland) David Hutton | (Scotland) Greenock Morton | Free |
| (Scotland) Josh McArthur | (Scotland) St Mirren | Free |
| (Scotland) Kevin Kyle | (Scotland) Rangers | Free |
| (Scotland) Kyle McAusland | (Scotland) Rangers | Loan |
| (Scotland) Brian Gilmour | (Iceland) KA | Free |

=== Players out ===
| Player | To | Fee |
|---|---|---|
| (Scotland) Austin McCann | (Scotland) Clydebank | Free |
| (Scotland) Alistair Brown | Free Agent | Released |
| (Scotland) Marc Twaddle | (Scotland) Irvine Meadow | Free |
| (Scotland) John Robertson | Retired | |
| (Scotland) David Winters | (Scotland) Queen's Park | Free |
| (Scotland) Ryan McStay | (Northern Ireland) Portadown | Free |
| (Scotland) Liam Buchanan | (Scotland) East Fife | Free |
| (Scotland) Ross Robertson | (Scotland) Glenafton Athletic | Free |
| (Scotland) Darren Brownlie | (Scotland) Partick Thistle | Free |
| (Scotland) David Sinclair | (Scotland) Airdrieonians | Free |
| (Scotland) Graeme Smith | (Scotland) Brechin City | Free |
| (Scotland) Darren McGill | (Scotland) Cumnock | Loan |
| (Scotland) Aaron Wyllie | (Scotland) Troon | Mutual Consent |
| (Scotland) Mark Shankland | (Scotland) Albion Rovers | Loan |
