= Michael Moffat =

Scottish footballer

Personal information
- Full name: Michael Moffat
- Date of birth: 15 February 1985 (age 41)
- Place of birth: Kilmarnock, Scotland
- Position: Striker

Team information
- Current team: Glenafton Athletic

Senior career*
Years	Team	Apps	(Gls)
2005–2011	Girvan		
2011–2014	Ayr United	124	(57)
2014–2017	Dunfermline Athletic	97	(21)
2017–2023	Ayr United	139	(20)
2023	→ Glenafton Athletic (loan)	0	(0)
- * Club domestic league appearances and goals as of 00:02, 19 June 2023 (UTC)

Michael Moffat (born 15 February 1985) is a Scottish footballer who plays as a striker for Glenafton Athletic.

== Career ==
=== Girvan and Ayr United ===
Moffat spent six seasons in Junior football with Girvan before signing for Ayr United in January 2011. Moffat scored eleven goals in his first season at Ayr, including the winner against Brechin City to get the club promoted to the First Division. The following season, Moffat netted seven goals for the Honest Men, all of which came in the First Division. During the 2011–12 campaign, Moffat also appeared for Ayr at Hampden Park for the League Cup semi-final against local rivals, Kilmarnock. In June 2012, Moffat signed a new deal along with Mark Roberts to stay at the Somerset Park outfit, following the club's relegation to the Second Division.

=== Dunfermline Athletic ===
After an impressive 2013–14 season, in which he finished as league top scorer, Moffat signed for League One rivals Dunfermline Athletic. His first competitive goal for the side came in his debut against Annan Athletic in the Scottish League Cup. However, in his first season with Dunfermline, Moffat was unable to replicate the consistent goal scoring he had seen at both Girvan and then Ayr, managing only six competitive goals for the Pars in the 2014–15 season. His second season with the club started positively, with the striker surpassing his previous season's tally in his first twelve competitive matches. Of these goals, three were scored in consecutive league matches against Brechin City, Cowdenbeath and Peterhead, whilst he also scored a brace against league rivals Forfar Athletic in the Scottish Challenge Cup.

=== Ayr United return ===
After three seasons away, Moffat returned to Ayr United on 23 May 2017, signing a two-year deal with the club.

=== Glenafton Athletic ===
In February 2023 Moffat joined West of Scotland League side Glenafton Athletic on loan until the end of the season.

== Career statistics ==
As of match played 11 May 2019

Appearances and goals by club, season and competition
Club	Season	League			Scottish Cup		League Cup		Other		Total	
Club	Season	Division	Apps	Goals	Apps	Goals	Apps	Goals	Apps	Goals	Apps	Goals
Girvan	2009–10	West of Scotland Super; League First Division	33	21	2	1	0	0	0	0	35	22
Girvan	2010–11	West of Scotland Super; League First Division	20	19	3	3	0	0	0	0	23	22
Girvan	Total		53	40	5	4	0	0	0	0	58	44
Ayr United	2010–11	Scottish Second Division	22	7	0	0	0	0	4 (Note: Appearances in the First Division play-offs)	4	26	11
Ayr United	2011–12	Scottish First Division	36	9	5	0	5	0	5 (Note: Three appearances in the Scottish Challenge Cup and two in the First Division play-offs)	0	51	9
Ayr United	2012–13	Scottish Second Division	34	16	2	2	2	3	1 (Note: Appearances in the Scottish Challenge Cup)	0	39	21
Ayr United	2013–14	Scottish League One	32	26	3	0	1	0	4 (Note: Two appearances and a goal in the Scottish Challenge Cup and two appearances in the Championship play-offs)	1	40	27
Ayr United	Total		124	57	10	2	8	3	14	5	156	67
Dunfermline Athletic	2014–15	Scottish League One	34	5	3	0	2	1	2	0	41	6
Dunfermline Athletic	2015–16	Scottish League One	34	12	3	0	3	0	3	3	43	15
Dunfermline Athletic	2016–17	Scottish Championship	29	4	4	0	4	2	1	0	38	6
Dunfermline Athletic	Total		97	21	10	0	9	3	6	3	122	27
Ayr United	2017–18	Scottish League One	35	11	3	0	5	2	2	0	36	13
Ayr United	2018–19	Scottish Championship	34	5	2	1	6	4	2 (Note: Appearances in the Scottish Premiership play-offs)	0	44	10
Ayr United	Total		69	16	5	1	11	6	4	0	89	23
Career total			343	134	30	7	28	12	24	8	425	161

== Honours ==
=== Club ===
Dunfermline Athletic

- Scottish League One: 2015–16

Ayr United

- Scottish League One: 2017–18
