= Michael Wardrope =

Scottish footballer

Personal information
- Full name: Michael Wardrope
- Date of birth: 17 December 1996 (age 29)
- Place of birth: Irvine, Scotland
- Position: Midfielder

Team information
- Current team: Auchinleck Talbot

Senior career*
Years	Team	Apps	(Gls)
2013–2017	Ayr United	18	(1)
2014–2015	→ Glenafton Athletic (loan)		
2017–2019	Kilwinning Rangers		
2019	→ Ardrossan Winton Rovers (loan)		
2019–2021	Hurlford United		
2021–2022	Irvine Meadow XI		
2022–	Auchinleck Talbot		
- * Club domestic league appearances and goals as of 23 March 2022

Michael Wardrope (born 17 December 1996) is a Scottish footballer who plays as a midfielder for Auchinleck Talbot in the West of Scotland Football League.

A native of Ardrossan (though born in Irvine), he came through the Ayr United academy system and made his debut in April 2013 in a match against Arbroath. He spent the 2014–15 season on loan at New Cumnock-based Junior side, Glenafton Athletic. After four years with Ayr United, Wardrope left the club in June 2017 to sign for Kilwinning Rangers.

On 21 June 2019 Wardrope has signed for Hurlford United.

On 22 March 2022, Auchinleck Talbot announced they had signed Wardrope from local rivals Irvine Meadow XI.

== Career statistics ==
Last update: 10 July 2016

Club performance			League		Scottish Cup		League Cup		Challenge Cup		Play-Offs		Total	
Season	Club	League	Apps	Goals	Apps	Goals	Apps	Goals	Apps	Goals	Apps	Goals	Apps	Goals
2012–13	Ayr United	Second Division	2	0	0	0	0	0	0	0	-		2	0
2013–14	Ayr United	League One	1	0	0	0	0	0	0	0	0	0	1	0
2014–15	Ayr United	League One	0	0	0	0	0	0	0	0	-		0	0
2015–16	Ayr United	League One	10	1	0	0	0	0	0	0	0	0	10	1
2016–17	Ayr United	Championship	0	0	0	0	0	0	0	0	0	0	0	0
Career total			13	1	0	0	0	0	0	0	0	0	13	1
