= Craig Moore (footballer, born 1994) =

Scottish footballer

Personal information
- Date of birth: 16 August 1994 (age 32)
- Place of birth: Glasgow, Scotland
- Height: 5 ft 10 in (1.78 m)
- Position: Forward

Team information
- Current team: Darvel

Youth career
- 2003–2009: Heart of Midlothian
- 2009–2011: Motherwell

Senior career*
| Years | Team | Apps | (Gls) |
| 2011–2017 | Motherwell | 27 | (1) |
| 2013 | → Cowdenbeath (loan) | 12 | (7) |
| 2015–2016 | → Ayr United (loan) | 25 | (14) |
| 2016–2017 | → Ayr United (loan) | 13 | (2) |
| 2017–2021 | Ayr United | 55 | (26) |
| 2021– | Darvel | | |
- * Club domestic league appearances and goals as of 19:54, 20 May 2021 (UTC)

Craig Moore (born 16 August 1994) is a Scottish footballer who plays as a forward for Darvel. Moore has previously played for Motherwell and has had loan spells with Cowdenbeath and Ayr United.

== Career ==
Moore started his career with Motherwell, playing for their youth teams up to under-20 level. On 31 January 2013, he went on a one-month loan to Cowdenbeath of the First Division, making his first-team debut as a substitute in a 1–1 home draw against Raith Rovers. That loan was then extended to the end of the season on 6 March 2013. On 25 March 2013, after five appearances and four goals on loan at Cowdenbeath, Moore signed a new contract with parent club Motherwell until Summer 2015.

On 8 August 2013, Moore made his debut for Motherwell appearing as a substitute in a Europa League match against Kuban Krasnodar. He made his league debut for Motherwell against Hearts as a substitute on 19 October 2013, scoring with his very first touch. He suffered a cruciate ligament injury in his right knee during a match against Inverness Caledonian Thistle in May 2014. On 2 June 2014, Moore signed a contract extension, keeping him at Fir Park until June 2016.

On 30 July 2015, Moore joined Scottish League One side Ayr United on loan until 4 January 2016. On 5 January 2016, his loan with Ayr was extended until the end of the season. After a successful season with the Honest Men, it was confirmed in July 2016 that Moore would return on loan to Somerset Park for the 2016–17 season.

After returning to Motherwell at the end of the season, Moore was released by the club in May 2017 following the end of his contract. He subsequently returned to Somerset Park once again on 25 May 2017, signing a one-year contract with the side who he'd previously had two loan spells with.

On 20 May 2021, Moore signed for West of Scotland League side Darvel.

== Career statistics ==
As of match played 11 May 2019

Appearances and goals by club, season and competition
| Club | Season | League | | | National Cup | | League Cup | | Other | | Total | |
| Club | Season | Division | Apps | Goals | Apps | Goals | Apps | Goals | Apps | Goals | Apps | Goals |
|---|---|---|---|---|---|---|---|---|---|---|---|---|
| Motherwell | 2012–13 | Scottish Premier League | 0 | 0 | 0 | 0 | 0 | 0 | 0 | 0 | 0 | 0 |
| Motherwell | 2013–14 | Scottish Premiership | 18 | 1 | 0 | 0 | 1 | 0 | 1 (Note: Appearance in the Europa League) | 0 | 20 | 1 |
| Motherwell | 2014–15 | Scottish Premiership | 9 | 0 | 0 | 0 | 0 | 0 | 1 (Note: Appearance in the Premiership play-offs) | 0 | 10 | 0 |
| Motherwell | 2015–16 | Scottish Premiership | 0 | 0 | 0 | 0 | 0 | 0 | — | | 0 | 0 |
| Motherwell | 2016–17 | Scottish Premiership | 0 | 0 | 0 | 0 | 0 | 0 | — | | 0 | 0 |
| Motherwell | Total | | 27 | 1 | 0 | 0 | 1 | 0 | 2 | 0 | 30 | 1 |
| Cowdenbeath (loan) | 2012–13 | Scottish First Division | 12 | 7 | 0 | 0 | 0 | 0 | 0 | 0 | 12 | 7 |
| Ayr United (loan) | 2015–16 | Scottish League One | 25 | 14 | 0 | 0 | 1 | 0 | 4 (Note: One appearance in the Scottish Challenge Cup and three in the Championship play-offs) | 0 | 30 | 14 |
| Ayr United (loan) | 2016–17 | Scottish Championship | 13 | 2 | 3 | 1 | 1 | 0 | 0 | 0 | 17 | 3 |
| Ayr United | 2017–18 | Scottish League One | 31 | 19 | 3 | 3 | 5 | 3 | 2 (Note: Appearances in the Scottish Challenge Cup) | 2 | 41 | 28 |
| Ayr United | 2018–19 | Scottish Championship | 20 | 4 | 1 | 0 | 4 | 0 | 1 | 0 | 26 | 4 |
| Ayr United | Total | | 51 | 23 | 4 | 3 | 9 | 3 | 4 | 2 | 68 | 31 |
| Career total | | | 128 | 47 | 7 | 4 | 12 | 3 | 9 | 2 | 156 | 56 |

== Honours ==
SFL Young Player of the Month: March 2013 Ayr United Scottish league 1 playoff 2015-16 Scottish league 1 2017-18
