= Lawrence Shankland =

Scottish footballer (born 1995)

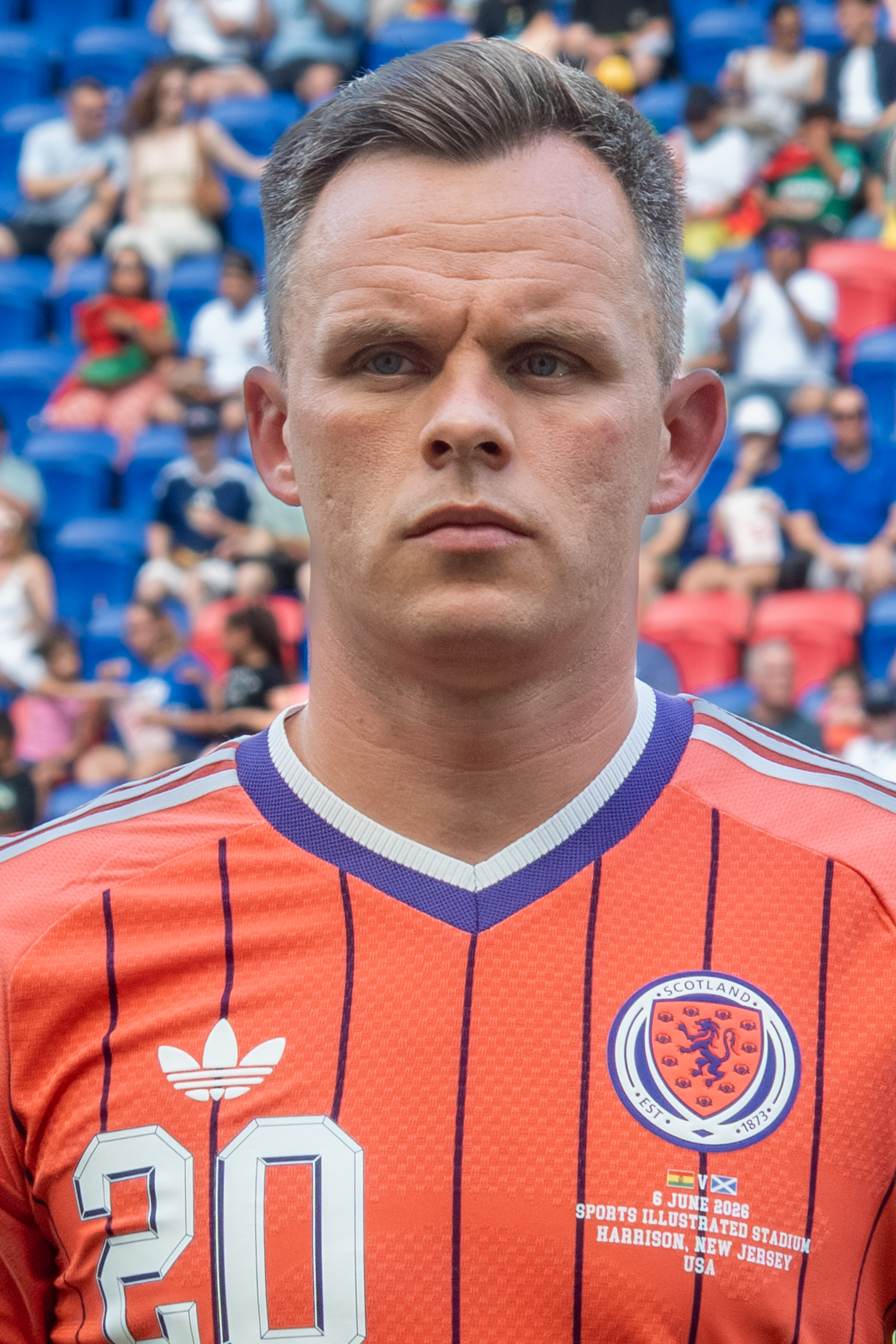
- Shankland with Scotland in 2026

Personal information
- Full name: Lawrence Shankland
- Date of birth: 10 August 1995 (age 31)
- Place of birth: Glasgow, Scotland
- Height: 6 ft 1 in (1.85 m)
- Position: Striker

Team information
- Current team: Rangers
- Number: 7

Youth career
- 2009–2011: Queen's Park

Senior career*
Years	Team	Apps	(Gls)
2011–2013	Queen's Park	34	(11)
2013–2017	Aberdeen	17	(0)
2014	→ Dunfermline Athletic (loan)	13	(7)
2015–2016	→ St Mirren (loan)	31	(10)
2016–2017	→ St Mirren (loan)	17	(0)
2017	→ Greenock Morton (loan)	16	(4)
2017–2019	Ayr United	61	(50)
2019–2021	Dundee United	59	(32)
2021–2022	Beerschot	26	(5)
2022–2026	Heart of Midlothian	135	(72)
2026–	Rangers	5	(3)

International career^{‡}
2015	Scotland U21	4	(2)
2019–	Scotland	22	(7)
- * Club domestic league appearances and goals as of 21:57, 5 September 2026 (UTC) ‡ National team caps and goals as of 25 June 2026

Lawrence Shankland (born 10 August 1995) is a Scottish professional footballer who plays as a striker for Scottish Premiership club Rangers, which he captains, and the Scotland national team.

Shankland began his career at Queen's Park before moving to Aberdeen in 2013. He played on loan with Dunfermline Athletic, St Mirren and Greenock Morton before joining Ayr United in 2017. He signed for Dundee United in 2019 and made his international debut later that year. In 2021 Shankland moved to Belgian club Beerschot, but returned to Scotland after one year, signing with Heart of Midlothian. At the Edinburgh club he was appointed captain before departing to join Rangers in the summer of 2026, just prior to making two appearances in the 2026 FIFA World Cup group stage (he had also featured at UEFA Euro 2024).

== Club career ==
=== Queen's Park ===
Shankland was born in Glasgow and attended Bannerman High School in Baillieston. He progressed through the Queen's Park youth system and was their top goalscorer in the 2012–13 season, having moved to the senior squad straight from the under-17 team; he also worked part-time as a tool setter in a local plumbing supplies company, a position arranged by the amateur club to help their young players earn a wage. He scored his first senior goal on 4 August 2012, aged 16, in a Scottish League Cup tie against Airdrieonians.

Shankland signed for Aberdeen at the end of the season. He was one of three Queen's Park players to move to top flight Scottish clubs at that time, as Andy Robertson and Aidan Connolly signed for Dundee United. Blair Spittal also made the move to Dundee United a year later.

=== Aberdeen ===
Shankland was initially placed in the Aberdeen under-20 squad, as he adjusted to full-time professional training. He made his debut appearance for Aberdeen in September 2014, in a 3–2 victory against Inverness Caledonian Thistle. After impressing in the under-20s, scoring plenty of goals, and making first team appearances as a substitute, Shankland signed a new contract to run until summer 2017; however, he was loaned to lower-division clubs for the vast majority of its duration. At the end of the 2016–17 season, Aberdeen confirmed that Shankland would be leaving the club.

==== Dunfermline loan ====
Shankland moved to Dunfermline Athletic on loan for the latter part of the 2013–14 season. The 18-year-old striker scored seven league goals during his short spell in Fife; however, injury prevented him taking part in the Pars' end-of-season promotion play-off with local rivals Cowdenbeath which ended in defeat.

==== St Mirren and Morton loans ====
Shankland was loaned to St Mirren in August 2015 for the rest of the 2015–16 season. He scored his first goal for the Buddies in a 2–1 home defeat to Raith Rovers on 18 September 2015. Shankland scored 10 goals in 32 appearances during his loan spell, and returned to Aberdeen at the end of the season.

In July 2016 it was confirmed that Shankland had returned to St Mirren, on a season-long loan. However, having failed to score any league goals in the first half of the season, his St Mirren deal was cut short and on 11 January 2017, he moved on loan to their rivals, fellow Scottish Championship side Greenock Morton. After helping the club to a fourth-place finish, his final appearance for Morton was in the Scottish Premiership playoff defeat to Dundee United.

=== Ayr United ===
In September 2017, free agent Shankland signed a short-term contract to play for Scottish League One club Ayr United until the following January. On 24 March 2018 he scored a hat-trick against former club Queen's Park. Ayr won the league by one point, and after finishing with 29 goals, Shankland was named as the division's PFA Scotland Players' Player of the Year.

He started the 2018–19 season with a hat-trick against former club Morton in the League Cup. On 28 July, he scored a "stunning goal" from 45 yards as Ayr defeated Partick Thistle to qualify for the knockout stage of the competition. With a goal against Dunfermline on 25 August 2018, Shankland moved to 41 goals in 42 games for the Honest Men.

In November 2018, he scored four goals in a league fixture away to Dundee United which ended 5–0 and put Ayr five points clear at the top of the table. However he then sustained an injury, and Ayr's form deteriorated in his absence. He returned towards the end of the season, but the team's campaign ended with defeat to Inverness CT in the opening round of the Premiership promotion play-offs, having finished in fourth position. Shankland, whose total return was 34 goals in 41 games, was nominated for the division's PFA Player of the Year Award, but lost out to another prolific striker, Stephen Dobbie. Both were named in the Team of the Year.

=== Dundee United ===
On 3 July 2019 it was announced that Shankland had left Ayr to join fellow Championship side Dundee United on a three-year contract, turning down offers from other clubs in both England and Scotland. He scored on his debut for the club in a Scottish League Cup tie against Hearts on 12 July 2019, and scored four goals in a 4–1 victory against Inverness Caledonian Thistle on the opening day of the 2019–20 Scottish Championship season. Shankland was named Scottish Championship Player of the Month for August 2019, having scored eight goals in four appearances during the month. The season was suspended in March 2020 due to the COVID-19 pandemic in Scotland, and curtailed a month later, with Dundee United declared winners and promoted; up to that point Shankland had scored 24 league goals to finish as the division's top scorer, and maintained the ratio of almost a goal-per-game he had set at Ayr, with a total of 28 from 33 appearances.

On 12 January 2021, Shankland scored with a "wonder strike" from 53 yards (48 m) to secure a 2–2 draw against St Johnstone.

=== Beerschot ===
On 11 August 2021, Shankland moved to Belgian side Beerschot for an undisclosed fee. Shankland scored five league goals for Beerschot during the 2021–22 season as they were relegated from the Belgian top division.

=== Heart of Midlothian ===
Shankland returned to Scottish football in July 2022, signing a three-year contract with Heart of Midlothian. He scored his first goal for Hearts in a 1–1 draw with Hibernian at Easter Road on 7 August 2022. After a season-ending injury to club captain Craig Gordon in a match on 28 December 2022, Shankland was named team captain for the rest of the season. In scoring in a Scottish Cup derby victory over Hibs in January 2023, he became the first Hearts player since John Robertson in the 1991–92 season to score 20 goals in all competitions.

In Gordon's continued absence, Shankland retained team captaincy for the 2023–24 season. His second season at Hearts showed a similar prolific form as his first, hitting 50 club goals by February 2024, less than 18 months after joining the club; he was only the second player to hit the milestone in the 21st century, after Jamie Walker.

During the 2024–25 season, Shankland's goalscoring output in the early part of the campaign was lower than in the previous season, with analysis noting a reduced conversion rate despite a similar volume of chances. In July 2025, Shankland signed a new three-year contract with the club.

In the 2025–26 season, he continued as club captain and contributed key goals in the title challenge, including in a 3–1 victory over Celtic on 26 October 2025 that increased Hearts' lead at the top of the table. He later netted the winning goal in a 2–1 victory against Rangers on 4 May 2026. On the final matchday of the season against Celtic, Shankland scored the opening goal in an eventual 3–1 defeat, resulting in Hearts finishing second in the title race behind Celtic. He ended the season with 16 league goals, just one short of top scorer Tawanda Maswanhise.

=== Rangers ===
On 26 May 2026, Rangers announced the signing of Shankland on a two-year deal with an option for an additional year. On 29 July 2026 Shankland was named club captain by manager Derek McInnes, a role that he had with McInnes at Hearts the season before.

== International career ==
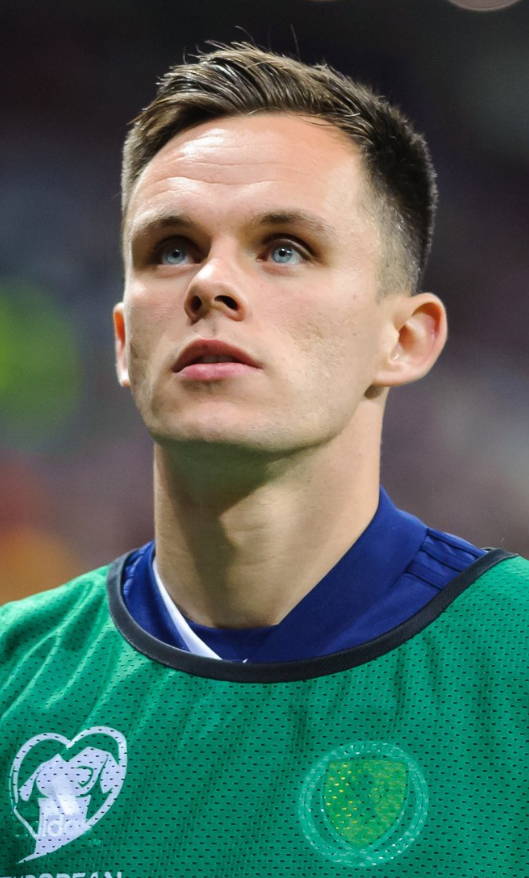
Shankland with Scotland in 2019.

Shankland represented Scotland under-18s in Victory Shield matches against the other home nations in 2012. He was first selected for the Scotland national under-21 football team in March 2015; he made his debut away to Hungary, scoring two late goals in a 2–1 victory. He made three other under-21 appearances, also in 2015, producing one draw and two defeats.

On 1 October 2019, Scotland manager Steve Clarke called up Shankland to the senior squad for the first time. He won his first cap when he came on as a second-half substitute in the side's 4–0 defeat by Russia on 10 October (playing alongside national team captain Andy Robertson for the first time since their time at Queen's Park in the fourth tier of Scottish football, nearly seven years earlier) and three days later made his first start and scored his first goal, the fourth in a 6–0 victory over San Marino at Hampden Park.

Shankland was recalled to the squad in March 2023, as an injury replacement for Ché Adams. He scored his second international goal on 16 November 2023, a late equaliser in a UEFA Euro 2024 qualifying match against Georgia. Shankland had again been a late addition to the squad as an injury replacement for Adams.

On 23 March 2024, Shankland was named in Scotland's starting XI for the first time since 2019 in a UEFA Euro 2024 warm-up match against the Netherlands.

On 7 June 2024, he was named in Scotland's 26-man squad for Euro 2024. He played the final eight minutes of the 5–1 loss to hosts Germany in the opening match of the tournament on 14 June. He went on to appear as a substitute against both Switzerland and Hungary as Scotland finished bottom of Group A with one point from three matches.

After a year out of the international team, Shankland was recalled for Scotland's 2026 FIFA World Cup qualifiers against Greece and Denmark in November 2025. He scored the second goal in a famous 4–2 win against Denmark on 18 November, allowing Scotland to top their group and qualify automatically for the 2026 FIFA World Cup; their first appearance at the tournament since 1998.

On 19 May 2026, Shankland was selected in the 26-man squad for the 2026 World Cup finals. He started in the 1–0 victory over Haiti and the 3–0 loss to Brazil, remaining on the bench in the 1–0 defeat by Morocco.

== Career statistics ==
=== Club ===
As of match played 5 September 2026

Appearances and goals by club, season and competition
Club	Season	League			National cup (Note: Includes Scottish Cup, Belgian Cup)		League cup (Note: Includes Scottish League Cup)		Europe		Other		Total	
Club	Season	Division	Apps	Goals	Apps	Goals	Apps	Goals	Apps	Goals	Apps	Goals	Apps	Goals
Queen's Park	2011–12	Scottish Third Division	1	0	0	0	0	0	—		0	0	1	0
Queen's Park	2012–13	Scottish Third Division	33	11	3	1	3	1	—		4 (Note: Two appearances and one goal in Scottish Challenge Cup, two appearances and one goal in Scottish Second Division play-offs)	2	43	15
Queen's Park	Total		34	11	3	1	3	1	—		4	2	44	15
Aberdeen	2013–14	Scottish Premiership	0	0	0	0	0	0	—		—		0	0
Aberdeen	2014–15	Scottish Premiership	17	0	0	0	0	0	0	0	—		17	0
Aberdeen	2015–16	Scottish Premiership	0	0	0	0	0	0	0	0	—		0	0
Aberdeen	2016–17	Scottish Premiership	0	0	0	0	0	0	0	0	—		0	0
Aberdeen	Total		17	0	0	0	0	0	0	0	—		17	0
Dunfermline Athletic (loan)	2013–14	Scottish League One	13	7	1	0	—		—		0	0	14	7
St Mirren (loan)	2015–16	Scottish Championship	31	10	1	0	0	0	—		0	0	32	10
St Mirren (loan)	2016–17	Scottish Championship	17	0	1	2	3	1	—		3 (Note: Appearances in Scottish Challenge Cup)	1	24	4
St Mirren (loan)	Total		48	10	2	2	3	1	—		3	1	56	14
Greenock Morton (loan)	2016–17	Scottish Championship	16	4	0	0	—		—		2 (Note: Appearances in Premiership play-offs)	0	18	4
Ayr United	2017–18	Scottish League One	30	26	3	3	0	0	—		0	0	33	29
Ayr United	2018–19	Scottish Championship	31	24	1	1	6	9	—		3 (Note: One appearance in Scottish Challenge Cup, two appearances in Premiership play-offs)	0	41	34
Ayr United	Total		61	50	4	4	6	9	—		3	0	74	63
Dundee United	2019–20	Scottish Championship	26	24	2	2	4	2	—		1	0	33	28
Dundee United	2020–21	Scottish Premiership	32	8	4	1	0	0	—		—		36	9
Dundee United	2021–22	Scottish Premiership	1	0	0	0	4	3	—		—		5	3
Dundee United	Total		59	32	6	3	8	5	—		1	0	74	40
Beerschot	2021–22	Belgian Pro League	26	5	2	0	—		—		—		28	5
Heart of Midlothian	2022–23	Scottish Premiership	37	24	1	1	1	0	8 (Note: Two appearances and one goal in UEFA Europa League, six appearances and two goals in UEFA Europa Conference League)	3	—		47	28
Heart of Midlothian	2023–24	Scottish Premiership	37	24	3	2	3	2	4 (Note: Appearances in UEFA (Europa) Conference League)	3	—		47	31
Heart of Midlothian	2024–25	Scottish Premiership	32	8	3	1	1	0	7	0	—		43	9
Heart of Midlothian	2025–26	Scottish Premiership	29	16	1	1	4	3	—		—		34	20
Heart of Midlothian	Total		135	72	8	5	9	5	19	6	—		171	88
Rangers	2026–27	Scottish Premiership	5	3	0	0	1	0	4 (Note: Two appearances in UEFA Europa League, two appearances in UEFA Conference League)	1	—		10	4
Career total			413	192	26	15	30	21	23	7	13	3	505	238

=== International ===
As of match played 24 June 2026

Appearances and goals by national team and year
National team	Year	Apps	Goals
Scotland	2019	2	1
Scotland	2020	2	0
Scotland	2023	3	1
Scotland	2024	9	1
Scotland	2025	2	1
Scotland	2026	4	3
Total		22	7

Scores and results list Scotland's goal tally first.

List of international goals scored by Lawrence Shankland
No.	Date	Venue	Opponent	Score	Result	Competition
1	13 October 2019	Hampden Park, Glasgow, Scotland	San Marino	4–0	6–0	UEFA Euro 2020 qualification
2	16 November 2023	Dinamo Arena, Tbilisi, Georgia	Georgia	2–2	2–2	UEFA Euro 2024 qualification
3	7 June 2024	Hampden Park, Glasgow, Scotland	Finland	2–0	2–2	Friendly
4	18 November 2025	Hampden Park, Glasgow, Scotland	Denmark	2–1	4–2	2026 FIFA World Cup qualification
5	30 May 2026	Hampden Park, Glasgow, Scotland	Curaçao	2–1	4–1	Friendly
6	30 May 2026	Hampden Park, Glasgow, Scotland	Curaçao	3–1	4–1	Friendly
7	6 June 2026	Sports Illustrated Stadium, Harrison, United States	Bolivia	1–0	4–0	Friendly

== Honours ==
Ayr United

- Scottish League One: 2017–18

Dundee United

- Scottish Championship: 2019–20

Individual

- PFA Scotland Players' Player of the Year: 2023–24
- Scottish Premiership top scorer: 2023–24
- PFA Scotland Team of the Year (Premiership): 2023–24, 2025–26
- SFWA Footballer of the Year: 2023–24
- PFA Scotland Players' Player of the Year (League One): 2017–18
- Scottish Premiership Player of the Month: November 2023, December 2023, September 2025
- Scottish Championship Player of the Month: August 2018, August 2019
- Scottish League One Player of the Month: November 2017, March 2018
