= 2018–19 Scottish Premiership =

Football league in Scotland

Scottish Premiership
- Season: 2018–19
- Dates: 4 August 2018 – 19 May 2019
- Champions: Celtic; 6th Premiership title 50th Scottish title
- Relegated: Dundee
- Champions League: Celtic
- Europa League: Rangers; Kilmarnock; Aberdeen
- Matches: 228
- Goals: 578 (2.54 per match)
- Top goalscorer: Alfredo Morelos (18 goals)
- Biggest home win: Hibernian 6–0 Hamilton Academical (6 October 2018); Rangers 7–1 Motherwell (11 November 2018)
- Biggest away win: St Johnstone 0–6 Celtic (7 October 2018)
- Highest scoring: Rangers 7–1 Motherwell (11 November 2018)
- Longest winning run: 8 matches: Celtic
- Longest unbeaten run: 16 matches: Celtic
- Longest winless run: 12 matches: St Mirren
- Longest losing run: 10 matches: Dundee
- Highest attendance: 59,143; Celtic 1–0 Aberdeen (29 September 2018)
- Lowest attendance: 1,022; Livingston 2–0 Hamilton Academical (3 April 2019)
- Total attendance: 3,641,850
- Average attendance: 15,973 (41)
- All statistics correct as of 19 May 2019.

The 2018–19 Scottish Premiership (known as the Ladbrokes Premiership for sponsorship reasons) was the sixth season of the Scottish Premiership, the highest division of Scottish football. The fixtures were published on 15 June 2018 and the season began on 4 August 2018.

Twelve teams contested the league: Aberdeen, Celtic, Dundee, Hamilton Academical, Heart of Midlothian, Hibernian, Kilmarnock, Livingston, Motherwell, Rangers, St Johnstone and St Mirren.

On 4 May 2019, Celtic won their eighth consecutive title and 50th overall after a 3–0 win over Aberdeen.

== Teams ==
To Premiership

St Mirren secured the Championship title and promotion to the Premiership on 14 April 2018 after a goalless draw with Livingston, who were also promoted after winning the play-off final.

To Championship

Ross County were relegated to the Championship on 12 May 2018 after a 1–1 draw with St Johnstone. Partick Thistle were also relegated following a 3–1 aggregate defeat to Livingston in the play-off final.

=== Stadia and locations ===
| Aberdeen | Celtic | Dundee | Hamilton Academical |
|---|---|---|---|
| Pittodrie Stadium | Celtic Park | Dens Park | New Douglas Park |
| Capacity: 20,866 | Capacity: 60,411 | Capacity: 11,775 | Capacity: 6,018 |
| Heart of Midlothian | Location of teams in 2018–19 Premiership | | Hibernian |
| Tynecastle Park | Location of teams in 2018–19 Premiership | | Easter Road |
| Capacity: 20,099 | Location of teams in 2018–19 Premiership | | Capacity: 20,421 |
| Kilmarnock | Location of teams in 2018–19 Premiership | | Livingston |
| Rugby Park | Location of teams in 2018–19 Premiership | | Almondvale Stadium |
| Capacity: 17,889 | Location of teams in 2018–19 Premiership | | Capacity: 9,512 |
| Motherwell | Rangers | St Johnstone | St Mirren |
| Fir Park | Ibrox Stadium | McDiarmid Park | St Mirren Park |
| Capacity: 13,677 | Capacity: 50,817 | Capacity: 10,696 | Capacity: 7,937 |

=== Personnel and kits ===
| Team | Manager | Captain | Kit manufacturer | Shirt sponsor |
|---|---|---|---|---|
| Aberdeen | (Scotland) Derek McInnes | (Scotland) Graeme Shinnie | Adidas | Saltire Energy |
| Celtic | (Northern Ireland) Neil Lennon (interim) | (Scotland) Scott Brown | New Balance | Dafabet |
| Dundee | (Northern Ireland) James McPake (interim) | (Scotland) Kenny Miller | Puma | McEwan Fraser Legal |
| Hamilton Academical | (Scotland) Brian Rice | (Scotland) Darian MacKinnon | Adidas | Euro Mechanical Handling |
| Heart of Midlothian | (Scotland) Craig Levein | (Scotland) Christophe Berra | Umbro | Save the Children |
| Hibernian | (England) Paul Heckingbottom | (Scotland) David Gray | Macron | Marathonbet |
| Kilmarnock | (Scotland) Steve Clarke | (Scotland) Kris Boyd | Nike | QTS |
| Livingston | (Scotland) Gary Holt | (Scotland) Craig Halkett | FBT | Tony Macaroni |
| Motherwell | (Northern Ireland) Stephen Robinson | (England) Peter Hartley | Macron | BetPark |
| Rangers | (England) Steven Gerrard | (England) James Tavernier | Hummel | 32Red |
| St Johnstone | (Northern Ireland) Tommy Wright | (Republic of Ireland) Joe Shaughnessy | BLK | Binn Group |
| St Mirren | (Northern Ireland) Oran Kearney | (Scotland) Stephen McGinn | Joma | Skyview Capital |

=== Managerial changes ===
| Team | Outgoing manager | Manner of departure | Date of vacancy | Position in table | Incoming manager | Date of appointment |
|---|---|---|---|---|---|---|
| Rangers | (Northern Ireland) Jimmy Nicholl | End of interim | 13 May 2018 | Pre-season | (England) Steven Gerrard | 1 June 2018 |
| St Mirren | (Scotland) Jack Ross | Signed by Sunderland | 25 May 2018 | Pre-season | (England) Alan Stubbs | 8 June 2018 |
| Livingston | (Scotland) David Hopkin | Contract expired | 31 May 2018 | Pre-season | (Scotland) Kenny Miller | 30 June 2018 |
| Livingston | (Scotland) Kenny Miller | Mutual consent | 20 August 2018 | 9th | (Scotland) Gary Holt | 23 August 2018 |
| St Mirren | (England) Alan Stubbs | Sacked | 3 September 2018 | 11th | (Northern Ireland) Oran Kearney | 7 September 2018 |
| Dundee | (Scotland) Neil McCann | Sacked | 16 October 2018 | 12th | (Scotland) Jim McIntyre | 17 October 2018 |
| Hamilton Academical | (Scotland) Martin Canning | Mutual consent | 29 January 2019 | 10th | (Scotland) Brian Rice | 31 January 2019 |
| Hibernian | (Northern Ireland) Neil Lennon | Mutual consent | 30 January 2019 | 8th | (Scotland) Eddie May (caretaker) | 30 January 2019 |
| Hibernian | (Scotland) Eddie May | End of caretaker spell | 13 February 2019 | 8th | (England) Paul Heckingbottom | 13 February 2019 |
| Celtic | (Northern Ireland) Brendan Rodgers | Signed by Leicester City | 26 February 2019 | 1st | (Northern Ireland) Neil Lennon (interim) | 26 February 2019 |
| Dundee | (Scotland) Jim McIntyre | Sacked | 12 May 2019 | 12th | (Northern Ireland) James McPake | 13 May 2019 |

== Format ==
In the initial phase of the season, the 12 teams will play a round-robin tournament whereby each team plays each one of the other teams three times. After 33 games, the league splits into two sections of six teams, with each team playing every other team in their section once. The league attempts to balance the fixture list so that teams in the same section have played each other twice at home and twice away, but sometimes this is impossible. A total of 228 matches will be played, with 38 matches played by each team.

== League summary ==
=== League table ===
| Pos | Team | Pld | W | D | L | GF | GA | GD | Pts | Qualification or relegation (Note: Teams play each other three times (33 matches), before the league is split into two groups (the top six and the bottom six).) |
|---|---|---|---|---|---|---|---|---|---|---|
| 1 | Celtic (C) | 38 | 27 | 6 | 5 | 77 | 20 | +57 | 87 | Qualification for the Champions League first qualifying round |
| 2 | Rangers | 38 | 23 | 9 | 6 | 82 | 27 | +55 | 78 | Qualification for the Europa League first qualifying round |
| 3 | Kilmarnock | 38 | 19 | 10 | 9 | 50 | 31 | +19 | 67 | Qualification for the Europa League first qualifying round |
| 4 | Aberdeen | 38 | 20 | 7 | 11 | 57 | 44 | +13 | 67 | Qualification for the Europa League first qualifying round |
| 5 | Hibernian | 38 | 14 | 12 | 12 | 51 | 39 | +12 | 54 | |
| 6 | Heart of Midlothian | 38 | 15 | 6 | 17 | 42 | 50 | −8 | 51 | |
| 7 | St Johnstone | 38 | 15 | 7 | 16 | 38 | 48 | −10 | 52 | |
| 8 | Motherwell | 38 | 15 | 6 | 17 | 46 | 56 | −10 | 51 | |
| 9 | Livingston | 38 | 11 | 11 | 16 | 42 | 44 | −2 | 44 | |
| 10 | Hamilton Academical | 38 | 9 | 6 | 23 | 28 | 75 | −47 | 33 | |
| 11 | St Mirren (O) | 38 | 8 | 8 | 22 | 34 | 66 | −32 | 32 | Qualification for the Premiership play-off final |
| 12 | Dundee (R) | 38 | 5 | 6 | 27 | 31 | 78 | −47 | 21 | Relegation to the Championship |

Source: Soccerway BBC SPFL
Rules for classification: 1) Points; 2) Goal difference; 3) Goals scored; 4) Play-off (only if deciding champion, UEFA competitions qualification and second stage group allocation).
(C) Champions; (O) Play-off winners; (R) Relegated

=== Positions by round ===
The table lists the positions of teams after each week of matches. In order to preserve chronological progress, any postponed matches are not included in the round at which they were originally scheduled but added to the full round they were played immediately afterwards. For example, if a match is scheduled for matchday 13, but then postponed and played between days 16 and 17, it will be added to the standings for day 16.

| Leader – Qualification for Champions League first qualifying round |
| Qualification for Europa League first qualifying round |
| Qualification for Premiership play-off final |
| Relegation to 2019–20 Championship |

| Team \ Round | 1 | 2 | 3 | 4 | 5 | 6 | 7 | 8 | 9 | 10 | 11 | 12 | 13 | 14 | 15 | 16 | 17 | 18 | 19 | 20 | 21 | 22 | 23 | 24 | 25 | 26 | 27 | 28 | 29 | 30 | 31 | 32 | 33 | 34 | 35 | 36 | 37 | 38 |
|---|---|---|---|---|---|---|---|---|---|---|---|---|---|---|---|---|---|---|---|---|---|---|---|---|---|---|---|---|---|---|---|---|---|---|---|---|---|---|
| Celtic | 3 | 6 | 2 | 2 | 2 | 6 | 5 | 3 | 2 | 3 | 2 | 2 | 1 | 1 | 2 | 3 | 1 | 1 | 1 | 1 | 1 | 1 | 1 | 1 | 1 | 1 | 1 | 1 | 1 | 1 | 1 | 1 | 1 | 1 | 1 | 1 | 1 | 1 |
| Rangers | 7 | 3 | 4 | 7 | 4 | 2 | 6 | 6 | 5 | 5 | 4 | 3 | 3 | 2 | 1 | 2 | 2 | 2 | 2 | 2 | 2 | 3 | 2 | 2 | 2 | 2 | 2 | 2 | 2 | 2 | 2 | 2 | 2 | 2 | 2 | 2 | 2 | 2 |
| Kilmarnock | 4 | 4 | 6 | 3 | 7 | 5 | 4 | 4 | 3 | 2 | 3 | 4 | 4 | 4 | 3 | 1 | 3 | 3 | 4 | 3 | 3 | 2 | 3 | 4 | 4 | 4 | 4 | 4 | 4 | 4 | 3 | 3 | 3 | 4 | 4 | 3 | 3 | 3 |
| Aberdeen | 6 | 5 | 5 | 8 | 8 | 7 | 7 | 7 | 7 | 8 | 8 | 7 | 6 | 6 | 7 | 6 | 6 | 4 | 3 | 4 | 4 | 4 | 4 | 3 | 3 | 3 | 3 | 3 | 3 | 3 | 4 | 4 | 4 | 3 | 3 | 4 | 4 | 4 |
| Hibernian | 2 | 2 | 3 | 6 | 5 | 3 | 2 | 2 | 6 | 6 | 5 | 6 | 8 | 7 | 8 | 8 | 8 | 8 | 7 | 8 | 8 | 8 | 7 | 7 | 8 | 8 | 6 | 6 | 6 | 6 | 6 | 6 | 5 | 5 | 5 | 5 | 5 | 5 |
| Hearts | 1 | 1 | 1 | 1 | 1 | 1 | 1 | 1 | 1 | 1 | 1 | 1 | 2 | 3 | 4 | 4 | 4 | 5 | 5 | 5 | 5 | 6 | 5 | 5 | 5 | 5 | 5 | 5 | 5 | 5 | 5 | 5 | 6 | 6 | 6 | 6 | 6 | 6 |
| St Johnstone | 10 | 10 | 8 | 5 | 6 | 8 | 8 | 8 | 8 | 7 | 7 | 5 | 5 | 5 | 5 | 5 | 5 | 7 | 8 | 6 | 6 | 5 | 6 | 6 | 6 | 6 | 7 | 7 | 8 | 7 | 8 | 7 | 7 | 7 | 7 | 7 | 7 | 7 |
| Motherwell | 12 | 12 | 11 | 9 | 9 | 10 | 10 | 10 | 10 | 10 | 9 | 9 | 9 | 9 | 9 | 9 | 9 | 9 | 9 | 9 | 9 | 9 | 9 | 9 | 7 | 7 | 8 | 8 | 7 | 8 | 7 | 8 | 8 | 8 | 8 | 8 | 8 | 8 |
| Livingston | 9 | 9 | 7 | 4 | 3 | 4 | 3 | 5 | 4 | 4 | 6 | 8 | 7 | 8 | 6 | 7 | 7 | 6 | 6 | 7 | 7 | 7 | 8 | 8 | 9 | 9 | 9 | 9 | 9 | 9 | 9 | 9 | 9 | 9 | 9 | 9 | 9 | 9 |
| Hamilton Academical | 11 | 8 | 9 | 10 | 11 | 9 | 9 | 9 | 9 | 9 | 10 | 10 | 10 | 10 | 10 | 10 | 10 | 10 | 10 | 10 | 10 | 10 | 10 | 10 | 10 | 11 | 11 | 10 | 10 | 10 | 10 | 10 | 10 | 10 | 10 | 10 | 10 | 10 |
| St Mirren | 5 | 7 | 10 | 11 | 10 | 11 | 11 | 11 | 11 | 11 | 11 | 11 | 11 | 11 | 11 | 11 | 12 | 11 | 11 | 11 | 11 | 12 | 12 | 12 | 12 | 12 | 12 | 12 | 12 | 12 | 11 | 11 | 11 | 11 | 11 | 11 | 11 | 11 |
| Dundee | 8 | 11 | 12 | 12 | 12 | 12 | 12 | 12 | 12 | 12 | 12 | 12 | 12 | 12 | 12 | 12 | 11 | 12 | 12 | 12 | 12 | 11 | 11 | 11 | 11 | 10 | 10 | 11 | 11 | 11 | 12 | 12 | 12 | 12 | 12 | 12 | 12 | 12 |

Updated: 19 May 2019

== Results ==
=== Matches 1–22 ===
Teams play each other twice, once at home and once away.

| Home \ Away | ABE | CEL | DUN | HAM | HOM | HIB | KIL | LIV | MOT | RAN | STJ | STM |
|---|---|---|---|---|---|---|---|---|---|---|---|---|
| Aberdeen | — | 3–4 | 5–1 | 3–0 | 2–0 | 1–0 | 0–2 | 3–2 | 1–0 | 1–1 | 0–2 | 4–1 |
| Celtic | 1–0 | — | 3–0 | 1–0 | 5–0 | 4–2 | 5–1 | 3–1 | 3–0 | 1–0 | 2–0 | 4–0 |
| Dundee | 0–1 | 0–5 | — | 4–0 | 0–3 | 0–3 | 1–2 | 0–0 | 1–3 | 1–1 | 0–2 | 1–1 |
| Hamilton Academical | 0–3 | 0–3 | 0–2 | — | 1–4 | 0–1 | 1–1 | 1–0 | 1–2 | 1–4 | 1–2 | 3–0 |
| Heart of Midlothian | 2–1 | 1–0 | 1–2 | 2–0 | — | 0–0 | 0–1 | 0–0 | 1–0 | 1–2 | 2–1 | 4–1 |
| Hibernian | 1–1 | 2–0 | 2–2 | 6–0 | 0–1 | — | 3–2 | 1–1 | 3–0 | 0–0 | 0–1 | 2–2 |
| Kilmarnock | 1–2 | 2–1 | 3–1 | 1–1 | 0–1 | 3–0 | — | 2–0 | 3–1 | 2–1 | 2–0 | 2–1 |
| Livingston | 1–2 | 0–0 | 4–0 | 1–0 | 5–0 | 2–1 | 0–0 | — | 2–0 | 1–0 | 0–1 | 3–1 |
| Motherwell | 3–0 | 1–1 | 1–0 | 0–1 | 0–1 | 1–0 | 0–1 | 1–1 | — | 3–3 | 0–1 | 0–1 |
| Rangers | 0–1 | 1–0 | 4–0 | 1–0 | 3–1 | 1–1 | 1–1 | 3–0 | 7–1 | — | 5–1 | 2–0 |
| St Johnstone | 1–1 | 0–6 | 1–0 | 4–0 | 2–2 | 1–1 | 0–0 | 1–0 | 1–2 | 1–2 | — | 2–0 |
| St Mirren | 1–2 | 0–0 | 2–1 | 1–3 | 2–0 | 0–1 | 1–2 | 0–2 | 0–2 | 0–2 | 0–1 | — |

Source: SPFL
Legend: Blue = home team win; Yellow = draw; Red = away team win.
For upcoming matches, an "a" indicates there is an article about the rivalry between the two participants.

=== Matches 23–33 ===
Teams play each other once.

| Home \ Away | ABE | CEL | DUN | HAM | HOM | HIB | KIL | LIV | MOT | RAN | STJ | STM |
|---|---|---|---|---|---|---|---|---|---|---|---|---|
| Aberdeen | — | — | — | 0–2 | — | — | 0–0 | 1–1 | 3–1 | 2–4 | — | 2–2 |
| Celtic | 0–0 | — | — | 3–0 | — | 2–0 | — | 0–0 | 4–1 | 2–1 | — | — |
| Dundee | 0–2 | 0–1 | — | — | 0–1 | 2–4 | 2–2 | — | 0–1 | — | — | — |
| Hamilton Academical | — | — | 1–1 | — | 1–0 | — | — | — | — | 0–5 | 2–1 | 1–1 |
| Heart of Midlothian | 2–1 | 1–2 | — | — | — | 1–2 | — | 0–0 | — | — | 2–0 | 1–1 |
| Hibernian | 1–2 | — | — | 2–0 | — | — | 0–0 | — | 2–0 | 1–1 | — | — |
| Kilmarnock | — | 0–1 | — | 5–0 | 1–2 | — | — | — | 0–0 | — | 2–0 | — |
| Livingston | — | — | 1–2 | 2–0 | — | 1–2 | 1–0 | — | — | 0–3 | 3–1 | — |
| Motherwell | — | — | — | 3–0 | 2–1 | — | — | 3–0 | — | 0–3 | 3–0 | — |
| Rangers | — | — | 4–0 | — | 3–0 | — | 1–1 | — | — | — | 0–0 | 4–0 |
| St Johnstone | 0–2 | 0–2 | 2–0 | — | — | 1–2 | — | — | — | — | — | 1–0 |
| St Mirren | — | 0–2 | 2–1 | — | — | 1–3 | 0–1 | 1–0 | 1–2 | — | — | — |

Source: SPFL
Legend: Blue = home team win; Yellow = draw; Red = away team win.
For upcoming matches, an "a" indicates there is an article about the rivalry between the two participants.

=== Matches 34–38 ===
After 33 matches, the league splits into two sections of six teams i.e. the top six and the bottom six, with the teams playing every other team in their section once (either at home or away). The exact matches are determined by the position of the teams in the league table at the time of the split.

==== Top six ====
| Home \ Away | ABE | CEL | HOM | HIB | KIL | RAN |
|---|---|---|---|---|---|---|
| Aberdeen | — | 0–3 | 2–1 | — | — | — |
| Celtic | — | — | 2–1 | — | 1–0 | — |
| Heart of Midlothian | — | — | — | — | 0–1 | 1–3 |
| Hibernian | 1–2 | 0–0 | 1–1 | — | — | — |
| Kilmarnock | 0–1 | — | — | 1–0 | — | 2–1 |
| Rangers | 2–0 | 2–0 | — | 1–0 | — | — |

Source: Scottish Premiership
Legend: Blue = home team win; Yellow = draw; Red = away team win.
For upcoming matches, an "a" indicates there is an article about the rivalry between the two participants.

==== Bottom six ====
| Home \ Away | DUN | HAM | LIV | MOT | STJ | STM |
|---|---|---|---|---|---|---|
| Dundee | — | 0–1 | — | — | — | 2–3 |
| Hamilton Academical | — | — | 3–3 | 1–1 | 2–0 | — |
| Livingston | 0–1 | — | — | — | — | 1–3 |
| Motherwell | 4–3 | — | 3–2 | — | — | 1–1 |
| St Johnstone | 2–0 | — | 1–1 | 2–0 | — | — |
| St Mirren | — | 2–0 | — | — | 1–1 | — |

Source: Scottish Premiership
Legend: Blue = home team win; Yellow = draw; Red = away team win.
For upcoming matches, an "a" indicates there is an article about the rivalry between the two participants.

== Season statistics ==
=== Scoring ===
==== Top scorers ====
As of 19 May 2019

| Rank | Player | Club | Goals |
|---|---|---|---|
| 1 | (Colombia) Alfredo Morelos | Rangers | 18 |
| 2 | (England) Sam Cosgrove | Aberdeen | 17 |
| 3 | (France) Odsonne Édouard | Celtic | 15 |
| 3 | (Scotland) David Turnbull | Motherwell | 15 |
| 5 | (England) James Tavernier | Rangers | 14 |
| 6 | (Scotland) James Forrest | Celtic | 11 |
| 6 | (Scotland) Eamonn Brophy | Kilmarnock | 11 |
| 6 | (Canada) Scott Arfield | Rangers | 11 |
| 9 | (Scotland) Steven Naismith | Heart of Midlothian | 10 |

==== Hat-tricks ====
| Player | For | Against | Score | Date |
|---|---|---|---|---|
| (Scotland) Steven Naismith | Hearts | St Mirren | 4–1 (H) | 1 September 2018 |
| (Scotland) James Forrest^{4} | Celtic | St Johnstone | 0–6 (A) | 7 October 2018 |
| (Scotland) Kenny Miller | Dundee | Hamilton Academical | 4–0 (H) | 5 December 2018 |
| (England) Scott Sinclair | Celtic | Aberdeen | 3–4 (A) | 26 December 2018 |
| (Canada) Scott Arfield | Rangers | Motherwell | 0–3 (A) | 7 April 2019 |
| (England) Cody Cooke | St Mirren | Dundee | 2–3 (A) | 18 May 2019 |

Note

^{4} Player scored four goals; (H) = Home, (A) = Away

=== Attendances ===
These are the average attendances of the teams.

| Pos | Team | Total | High | Low | Average | Change |
|---|---|---|---|---|---|---|
| 1 | Celtic | 1,097,782 | 59,143 | 54,563 | 57,778 | +0.1% |
| 2 | Rangers | 941,720 | 50,130 | 48,729 | 49,564 | +0.8% |
| 3 | Hibernian | 337,078 | 20,200 | 15,096 | 17,740 | −2.1% |
| 4 | Heart of Midlothian | 333,724 | 19,967 | 15,147 | 17,564 | −4.7% |
| 5 | Aberdeen | 283,567 | 20,027 | 12,252 | 14,924 | −5.4% |
| 6 | Kilmarnock | 130,999 | 12,374 | 4,143 | 6,894 | +27.9% |
| 7 | Dundee | 114,469 | 8,578 | 4,426 | 6,024 | +1.3% |
| 8 | Motherwell | 103,518 | 9,545 | 3,662 | 5,448 | 0.0% |
| 9 | St Mirren (Note: Club was playing in the Scottish Championship in the previous season.) | 101,680 | 7,288 | 4,001 | 5,351 | +20.3% |
| 10 | St Johnstone | 73,937 | 7,086 | 1,946 | 3,891 | +2.2% |
| 11 | Livingston | 69,616 | 9,246 | 1,022 | 3,664 | +171.8% |
| 12 | Hamilton Academical | 53,760 | 5,827 | 1,135 | 2,829 | −8.6% |
| | League total | 3,641,850 | 59,143 | 1,022 | 15,973 | +0.3% |

Updated to games played on 19 May 2019

== Awards ==
| Month | Manager of the Month | | Player of the Month | | Ref. |
| Month | Manager | Club | Player | Club | Ref. |
|---|---|---|---|---|---|
| August | (Scotland) Craig Levein | Hearts | (Scotland) Tony Watt | St Johnstone | |
| September | (Scotland) Gary Holt | Livingston | (Scotland) Steven Naismith | Hearts | |
| October | (Northern Ireland) Brendan Rodgers | Celtic | (Scotland) James Forrest | Celtic | |
| November | (Northern Ireland) Tommy Wright | St Johnstone | (Scotland) Ryan Christie | Celtic | |
| December | (Scotland) Derek McInnes | Aberdeen | (England) Sam Cosgrove | Aberdeen | |
| January | Winter Break | | | | |
| February | (Northern Ireland) Stephen Robinson | Motherwell | (Scotland) Jake Hastie | Motherwell | |
| March | (England) Paul Heckingbottom | Hibernian | (France) Odsonne Édouard | Celtic | |
| April | (England) Steven Gerrard | Rangers | (Canada) Scott Arfield | Rangers | |

=== Annual awards ===
| Award | Winner | Club |
|---|---|---|
| William Hill Premiership Player of the Year | (Scotland) James Forrest | Celtic |
| PFA Scotland Premiership Player of the Year | (Scotland) James Forrest | Celtic |
| PFA Scotland SPFL Young Player of the Year | (England) Ryan Kent | Rangers |
| PFA Scotland SPFL Manager of the Year | (Northern Ireland) Steve Clarke | Kilmarnock |
| PFA Scotland Goal of the Season | (Colombia) Alfredo Morelos | Rangers |
| SFWA Player of the Year | (Scotland) James Forrest | Celtic |

PFA Scotland Team of the Year
| Goalkeeper | (Scotland) Allan McGregor (Rangers) | | | |
| Defenders | (England) James Tavernier (Rangers) | (Denmark) Kristoffer Ajer (Celtic) | (Belgium) Dedryck Boyata (Celtic) | (Scotland) Craig Halkett (Livingston) |
| Midfielders | (Scotland) Callum McGregor (Celtic) | | (Scotland) Scott Brown (Celtic) | (Scotland) Graeme Shinnie (Aberdeen) |
| Forwards | (Scotland) James Forrest (Celtic) | | (Colombia) Alfredo Morelos (Rangers) | (England) Ryan Kent (Rangers) |

== Premiership play-offs ==
The quarter-final was contested by Ayr United and Inverness Caledonian Thistle, with Inverness Caledonian Thistle advancing to the semi-final where they lost to Dundee United. Dundee United faced St Mirren in the final, with the Saints securing the last place in the 2019–20 Premiership after victory in a penalty shoot-out.

Quarter-final
3 | Inverness Caledonian Thistle | 3 | 1 | 4
4 | Ayr United | 1 | 1 | 2

Semi-final
2 | Dundee United | 1 | 3 | 4
3 | Inverness Caledonian Thistle | 0 | 0 | 0

Final
1 | St. Mirren | 0 | 1 | 1 (2)
2 | Dundee United | 0 | 1 | 1 (0)

=== Quarter-final ===
==== First leg ====
| 7 May 2019 | Ayr United | 1–3 | Inverness Caledonian Thistle | Ayr |
| 19:45 | Rose 65' | BBC Report | Trafford 33'; White 51', 76' (pen.) | Stadium: Somerset Park; Attendance: 2,171; Referee: Alan Muir |

==== Second leg ====
| 11 May 2019 | Inverness Caledonian Thistle | 1–1 (4–2 agg.) | Ayr United | Inverness |
| 15:00 | Donaldson 79' | BBC Report | McCowan 19' | Stadium: Caledonian Stadium; Attendance: 2,323; Referee: Steven McLean |

=== Semi-final ===
==== First leg ====
| 14 May 2019 | Inverness Caledonian Thistle | 0–1 | Dundee United | Inverness |
| 19:45 | | Report | McMullan 78' | Stadium: Caledonian Stadium; Attendance: 2,604; Referee: Nick Walsh |

==== Second leg ====
| 17 May 2019 | Dundee United | 3–0 (4–0 agg.) | Inverness Caledonian Thistle | Dundee |
| 19:45 | Clark 45' (pen.); Sow 54'; Šafranko 80' | Report | | Stadium: Tannadice Park; Attendance: 8,504; Referee: Kevin Clancy |

=== Final ===
==== First leg ====
| 23 May 2019 | Dundee United | 0–0 | St Mirren | Dundee |
| 19:45 | | Report | | Stadium: Tannadice Park; Attendance: 11,062; Referee: Bobby Madden |

==== Second leg ====
| 26 May 2019 | St Mirren | 1–1 (a.e.t.) (1–1 agg.) (2–0 p) | Dundee United | Paisley |
| 15:00 | Mullen 26' | Report | Clark 23' (pen.) | Stadium: St Mirren Park; Attendance: 7,732; Referee: John Beaton |
| | Penalties |
| | McGinn (penalty scored); Popescu (penalty scored); Mužek (penalty missed) | | (penalty missed) Pawlett; (penalty missed) Šafranko; (penalty missed) Sow; (penalty missed) Booth |

== Broadcasting ==
=== Live Matches ===
The SPFL allows Sky Sports and BT Sport to broadcast up to six live home matches (combined) for each club, although this is only four for Celtic and Rangers. The TV deal allows the broadcasters to show 30 games each (and the play-offs for BT Sport) and provides approximately £21m to the SPFL per season.

=== Highlights ===
Sky Sports hold the rights to Saturday night highlights and show the Premiership goals on Sky Sports News in their Goals Express programme. Gaelic-language channel BBC Alba can broadcast in full the repeat of 38 Saturday 3pm matches "as live" at 5.30pm. The main Premiership highlights programme is BBC Scotland's Sportscene programme, which shows in-depth highlights of all six Premiership matches every weekend. STV show the goals on Monday nights during the Sport section of their News at Six programme. The SPFL also uploads the goals from every Premiership match onto its YouTube channel — available from 6pm on a Sunday for UK and Ireland viewers and 10pm on a Saturday for those worldwide.

== See also ==
- Nine in a row
