= 2011–12 Ayr United F.C. season =

Ayr United
2011–12 season
- Chairman: Lachlan Cameron
- Manager: Brian Reid
- Stadium: Somerset Park
- Scottish First Division: Ninth (relegated via 1st Division play-offs)
- Challenge Cup: Quarter Final; Lost to Annan Athletic
- League Cup: Semi-Final, lost to Kilmarnock
- Scottish Cup: Quarter Final, lost to Hibernian
- Top goalscorer: League: (Scotland) Michael Moffat (8) (Scotland) Mark Roberts (8); All: (Scotland) Mark Roberts (11)
- Highest home attendance: 1,938 vs. Falkirk, 20 August 2011
- Lowest home attendance: 1,096 vs. Ayr United, 29 February 2012
Home colours	Away colours

The 2011–12 season was Ayr United's first season back in the Scottish First Division, having been promoted from the Scottish Second Division at the end of the 2010–11 season. Ayr also competed in the Challenge Cup, League Cup and the Scottish Cup.

== Summary ==
Ayr United finished ninth in the First Division, entering the play-offs losing 3–1 to Airdrie United on aggregate in the Semi-final and were relegated to the Second Division. They reached the Quarter-final of the Challenge Cup, the Semi-final of the League Cup and the Quarter-final of the Scottish Cup.

== Results and fixtures ==
Win Draw Loss Postponed

=== Pre-season ===
9 July 2011 Friendly	Ayr United	1–0	St Mirren	Somerset Park, Ayr
15:00	Patterson 8O'	(St Mirren Report)		Attendance: 1,004; Referee: Steven McLean

16 July 2011 Friendly	Ayr United	1–1	St Johnstone	Somerset Park, Ayr
15:00	Roberts 36' (pen.)	(Ayr Report)	31' Millar	Attendance: 969; Referee: Iain Brines

18 July 2011 Friendly	Girvan	0–3	Ayr United	Hamilton Park, Girvan
15:00		(Ayr Report)	Robertson; 20' Wardlaw; 78' Patterson	Attendance: 321

25 July 2011 Friendly	Ayr United	0–1	Manchester United XI	Somerset Park, Ayr
19:00		(Ayr Report)	54' Norwood	Attendance: 2,876

=== Scottish First Division ===
6 August 2011 Match 1	Ayr United	1–2	Hamilton Academical	Somerset Park, Ayr
15:00	McGowan 8'; McGowan (yellow card) 76'; Trouten (yellow card) 85'; Geggan (yellow card) 86'; Moffat (yellow card) 90+1'	BBC Report	29', 57' McLaughlin; (yellow card) 37' Gillepsie	Attendance: 1,750; Referee: George Salmond

13 August 2011 Match 2	Dundee	1–1	Ayr United	Dens Park, Dundee
15:00	Hyde 30'; Milne (yellow card) 69'; Irvine (yellow card) 73'	Ayr Report	(yellow card) 2' Robertson; 14' Moffat; (yellow card) 17' Armstrong; (yellow card) 58' Campbell; (yellow card) 88' McKernon	Attendance: 4,686; Referee: Stevie O'Reilly

20 August 2011 Match 3	Ayr United	2–2	Falkirk	Somerset Park, Ayr
15:00	Wardlaw 29'; Roberts (yellow card) 47'; Malone 60'; Campbell (yellow card) 73' (red card); Robertson (yellow card) 90'	BBC Report	8' Higginbotham; 44' El Alagui; (yellow card) 47' Duffie; (yellow card) 59'Dods; (yellow card) 64' El Alagui; (yellow card) 65' Sibbald; (yellow card) 72' Scobbie	Attendance: 1,938; Referee: Stephen Finnie

27 August 2011 Match 4	Ayr United	2–1	Raith Rovers	Somerset Park, Ayr
15:00	Moffat 23'; Robertson 90'; Robertson (yellow card) 90'	Report	(red card) 28' Callachan; 34' Hamill; (yellow card) 88' Donaldson; (yellow card) 90' Williamson; (yellow card) 90' Baird	Attendance: 1,570; Referee: Matt Northcroft

10 September 2011 Match 5	Morton	4–1	Ayr United	Cappielow Park, Greenock
15:00	Peter MacDonald 10', 13'; Andy Jackson 11'; Peter Weatherson 89' (pen.)	BBC Report	Roberts 88' (pen.)	Attendance: 2,018; Referee: Conroy

17 September 2011 Match 6	Partick Thistle	4–0	Ayr United	Firhill Stadium, Glasgow
15:00	Rowson 49'; Cairney 65'; Erskine 73'; Doolan 90' (pen.)	BBC Report		Attendance: 2,639; Referee: O'Reilly

24 September 2011 Match 7	Ayr United	1–0	Queen of the South	Somerset Park, Ayr
15:00	Roberts 84'	BBC Report		Attendance: 1,582; Referee: Calum Murray

1 October 2011 Match 8	Ross County	4–0	Ayr United	Victoria Park, Dingwall
15:00	Brittain 5'; Lawson 64'; Morrow 69'; Vigurs 87'	BBC Sport		Attendance: 2,121; Referee: Hilland

15 October 2011 Match 9	Ayr United	0–0	Livingston	Somerset Park, Ayr
15:00		BBC Sport		Attendance: 1,390; Referee: McLean

22 October 2011 Match 10	Ayr United	1–3	Dundee	Somerset Park, Ayr
15:00	Roberts 83' (pen.)	BBC Report	Weston 16'; McIntosh 71'; Milne 87'	Attendance: 1,390; Referee: McKendrick

29 October 2011 Match 11	Hamilton Academical	2–3	Ayr United	New Douglas Park, Hamilton
15:00	Currie 17' (pen.); Spence 45'	BBC Report	Moffat 52'; Robertson 57'; Smith 90'	Attendance: 1,699; Referee: Somers

5 November 2011 Match 12	Ayr United	0–1	Morton	Somerset Park, Ayr
15:00		BBC Report	O'Brien 23'	Attendance: 1,570; Referee: Tumilty

12 November 2011 Match 13	Raith Rovers	0–1	Ayr United	Stark's Park, Kirkcaldy
15:00		BBC Report	Graham 10' (o.g.)	Attendance: 2,038; Referee: Beaton

26 November 2011	Ayr United	P – P	Partick Thistle	Somerset Park, Ayr
15:00

30 November 2011 Match 14	Ayr United	0–0	Partick Thistle	Somerset Park, Ayr
19:45		SFL Report		Attendance: 1,122; Referee: Colvin

3 December 2011 Match 15	Queen of the South	4–1	Ayr United	Palmerston Park, Dumfries
15:00	McKenna 31'; McLaughlin 71' (pen.); Carmichael 72'; Simmons 89'	BBC Report	Wardlaw 45'; Malone (red card) 70'	Attendance: 1,478; Referee: McLean

10 December 2011	Ayr United	P – P	Ross County	Somerset Park, Ayr
15:00

17 December 2012	Livingston	P – P	Ayr United	Almondvale Stadium, Livingston
15:00

26 December 2011 Match 16	Ayr United	1–1	Raith Rovers	Somerset Park, Ayr
15:00	Tiffoney 63'	BBC Report	Baird 42'	Attendance: 1,407; Referee: McKendrick

2 January 2012 Match 17	Greenock Morton	3–1	Ayr United	Cappielow Park, Greenock
15:00	O'Brien 44'; Campbell 64' di Giacomo 89'	BBC Report	Moffat 19'	Attendance: 2,108; Referee: O'Reilly

14 January 2012 Match 18	Falkirk	0–0	Ayr United	Falkirk Stadium, Falkirk
15:00		BBC Sport		Attendance: 3,091; Referee: Collum

21 January 2012 Match 19	Ayr United	2–2	Hamilton Academical	Somerset Park, Ayr
15:00	Dodd 32'; Malone 45'	BBC Sport	Spence 46'; Redmond 53'	Attendance: 1,310; Referee: Richmond

28 January 2012	Partick Thistle	P – P	Ayr United	Firhill Stadium, Glasgow
15:00

11 February 2012 Match 20	Ayr United	1–1	Queen of the South	Somerset Park, Ayr
15:00	Moffat 85'	SFL Sport	McLaughlin 76'	Attendance: 1,475; Referee: Clancy

18 February 2012 Match 21	Ross County	1–1	Ayr United	Victoria Park, Dingwall
15:00	Munro 7'	SFL Sport	Tomsett 79'; Tiffoney (red card) 81'	Attendance: 2,390; Referee: Norris

21 February 2012 Match 22	Partick Thistle	4–2	Ayr United	Firhill Stadium, Glasgow
19:45	Doolan 55', 64'; Cairney 81', 90'	SFL Sport	Parker 4'; McGowan 88'	Attendance: 1,439; Referee: Murray

25 February 2012 Match 23	Ayr United	3–1	Livingston	Somerset Park, Ayr
15:00	Geggan 33', 56'; Malone 53'	SFL Report	Cummings 11'	Attendance: 1,312; Referee: Thomson

29 February 2012 Match 24	Ayr United	2–3	Ross County	Somerset Park, Ayr
19:45	Parker 52', 75'	SFL Report	Brittain 16', 38' (Penalty), 80'	Attendance: 1,096; Referee: Clancy

3 March 2012 Match 25	Ayr United	1–0	Falkirk	Somerset Park, Ayr
15:00	Geggan 78'	BBC Report		Attendance: 1,621; Referee: McKendrick; Man of the Match: Smith

6 March 2012 Match 26	Livingston	1–2	Ayr United	Almondvale Stadium, Livingston
19:45	Ke. Jacobs 12'	SFL Report	Roberts 20' (pen.); McGowan 66'	Attendance: 859; Referee: Finnie

13 March 2012	Dundee	P – P	Ayr United	Dens Park, Dundee
19:45		Report

17 March 2012 Match 27	Raith Rovers	2–2	Ayr United	Stark's Park, Kirkcaldy
15:00	Graham 13'; Casalinuovo 90'	BBC Sport	Roberts 64' (pen.); Malone 79'	Attendance: 1,861; Referee: Allan

24 March 2012 Match 28	Ayr United	0–0	Greenock Morton	Somerset Park, Ayr
15:00		BBC Report		Attendance: 1,669; Referee: Brines

27 March 2012 Match 29	Dundee	4–1	Ayr United	Dens Park, Dundee
19:45	McCluskey 20'; Milne 62'; Conroy 90'; Hyde 90+2'	BBC Report	Roberts 77'	Attendance: 3,136; Referee: Brines

31 March 2012 Match 30	Queen of the South	2–1	Ayr United	Palmerston Park, Dumfries
15:00	Johnston 14'; Parkin 24'	BBC Report	Moffat 78'	Attendance: 2,079; Referee: Richmond

7 April 2012 Match 31	Ayr United	1–3	Partick Thistle	Somerset Park, Ayr
15:00	Dodd 79' (red card) 85'	BBC Report	Erskine 27'; Doolan 33'; McGuigan 90'	Attendance: 1,761; Referee: Madden

11 April 2012 Match 32	Ayr United	1–3	Ross County	Somerset Park, Ayr
19:45	Trouten 63'	BBC Report	Gardyne 46'; McMenamin 67'; Morrow 84'	Attendance: 1,389; Referee: Colvin

14 April 2012 Match 33	Livingston	0–1	Ayr United	Almondvale Stadium, Livingston
15:00		BBC Report	Roberts 24'	Attendance: 1,375; Referee: Winter

21 April 2012 Match 34	Hamilton Academical	3–2	Ayr United	New Douglas Park, Hamilton
15:00	McShane 24', 89'; Redmond 58'	SFL Report; BBC Report	Roberts 17'; Malone (red card) 48'; McGowan 59'	Attendance: 1,645; Referee: Charleston

28 April 2012 Match 35	Ayr United	3–2	Dundee	Somerset Park, Ayr
15:00	Parker 61', 84'; Robertson 89'	SFL Report	Conroy 14'; Milne 70'	Attendance: 1,656; Referee: Muir

5 May 2012 Match 36	Falkirk	3–2	Ayr United	Falkirk Stadium, Falkirk
15:00	Scobbie 7' (pen.); El Alagui 56'; Alston 63'	BBC Sport	Moffat 51', 81'	Attendance: 3,445; Referee: Tumilty

=== First Division play-offs ===
9 May 2012 Play-offs SF R1	Airdrie United	0–0	Ayr United	Excelsior Stadium, Airdrie
19:45		SFL Report		Attendance: 1,871; Referee: Allan

12 May 2012 Play-offs SF R2	Ayr United	1–3	Airdrie United	Somerset Park, Ayr
15:00	Longridge (red card) 17'; Geggan 64'; Tiffoney (yellow card) 94' (red card)	BBC Report	Holmes 55', 65'; McLaren 85'	Attendance: 2,782; Referee: McLean

=== Scottish League Cup ===
30 July 2011 Scottish League Cup round 1	East Stirlingshire	0–3	Ayr United	Ochilview Park, Stenhousemuir
15:00		Ayr Report	39' Trouten; 45', 52' Roberts	Attendance: 535; Referee: Euan Anderson

24 August 2011 Scottish League Cup round 2	Ayr United	1–0	Inverness Caledonian Thistle	Somerset Park, Ayr
19:30	Wardlaw (yellow card) 53'; Malone 60'	BBC Report	(yellow card) 40' Golobart; (yellow card) 90' Tadé	Attendance: 987; Referee: Brian Winter

21 September 2011 Scottish League Cup round 3	Ayr United	1–1 (a.e.t.) (4–1 p)	Hearts	Somerset Park, Ayr
19:45	Trouten (yellow card) 26'; Malone (yellow card) 45'; Wardlaw 63'; Smith (yellow card) 81'	BBC Report	Jonsson 49'; Jonsson (yellow card) 61'; Barr (yellow card) 112'	Attendance: 2,517; Referee: Iain Brines
	Penalties
	Moffat (penalty scored); McKernon (penalty scored); Trouten (penalty scored); Roberts (penalty scored)		Jónsson (penalty scored); Grainger (penalty missed); Skácel (penalty missed)

25 October 2011 Scottish League Cup Quarter-Final	St Mirren	0–1	Ayr United	St Mirren Park, Paisley
19:45		BBC Report	Smith 81'	Attendance: 4,570; Referee: O'Reilly

28 January 2012 Scottish League Cup Semi-Final	Ayr United	0–1 (a.e.t.)	Kilmarnock	Hampden Park, Glasgow
13:00		BBC Report	Shiels 109'	Attendance: 25,057; Referee: McLean

=== Scottish Cup ===
19 November 2011 Scottish Cup round 3	Ayr United	2–2	Montrose	Somerset Park, Ayr
15:00	Robertson 11'; Trouten 55' (pen.)	BBC Report	Mason 24'; Winter 57' (pen.)	Attendance: 988; Referee: Northcroft

22 November 2011 Scottish Cup round 3 Replay	Montrose	1–2	Ayr United	Links Park, Montrose
19:45	Winter 81'	Sky Report; Ayr Report	Trouten 28', 73'	Attendance: 575; Referee: Northcroft

7 January 2012 Scottish Cup round 4	Livingston	1–2	Ayr United	Braidwood Motor Company Stadium, Livingston
15:15	McNulty 43'	BBC Sport	Geggan 39'; McGowan 52'	Attendance: 932; Referee: Salmond

4 February 2012 Scottish Cup round 5	Ayr United	P – P	Falkirk	Somerset Park, Ayr
15:00

15 February 2012 Scottish Cup round 5	Ayr United	2–1	Falkirk	Somerset Park, Ayr
15:00	Geggan 19'; Roberts 57' (Penalty)	BBC Report	Alston 6'	Referee: Allan

10 March 2012 Scottish Cup QF	Ayr United	0–2	Hibernian	Somerset Park, Ayr
15:00		BBC Report	O'Donovan 6'; Griffiths 19' (pen.)	Attendance: 5,991; Referee: McLean

=== Scottish Challenge Cup ===
23 July 2011 Scottish Challenge Cup round 1	Ayr United	2–0 (a.e.t.)	Queen of the South	Somerset Park, Ayr
15:00	Campbell 94'; Geggan 115'	(Report)		Attendance: 1,272; Referee: Brian Winter

9 August 2011 Scottish Challenge Cup round 2	Ayr United	3–0	Raith Rovers	Somerset Park, Ayr
19:45	Patterson 43'; Campbell (yellow card) 70'; McKernon 76'; R. Robertson 79'	(Report) (Commentary)	Dyer (yellow card) 83'	Attendance: 227; Referee: Steve Conroy

4 September 2011 Challenge Cup QF	Ayr United	0–1	Annan Athletic	Somerset Park, Ayr
15:00		BBC Report	Cox 58'	Attendance: 1,232; Referee: Charleston

|}Last updated: 11 August 2011
Source: The Scottish Football League

== Player statistics ==
=== Captains ===
No.	P	Name	Country	No. games	Notes
	FW	Mark Roberts	(Scotland)	48	Club captain

Last updated: 13 May 2012
Source: Competitive match reports.
Competitive matches only
Matches started as captain only
Country: FIFA nationality; No.: Squad number; P: Position; Name: Player name; No. Games: Number of games started as captain.

=== Squad statistics ===
Last updated 13 May 2012

No.	Pos	Nat	Player	Total		Scottish First Division		Scottish Cup		League Cup		Other^{[a]}	
No.	Pos	Nat	Player	Apps	Goals	Apps	Goals	Apps	Goals	Apps	Goals	Apps	Goals
	GK	(Scotland) SCO	Ryan McWilliams	1	0	1+0	0	0+0	0	0+0	0	0+0	0
	GK	(Scotland) SCO	Kevin Cuthbert	50	0	35+0	0	5+0	0	5+0	0	5+0	0
	DF	(Scotland) SCO	Martyn Campbell	16	1	7+2	0	1+0	0	2+0	0	3+1	1
	DF	(Scotland) SCO	Bobby Donnelly	0	0	0+0	0	0+0	0	0+0	0	0+0	0
	DF	(Scotland) SCO	Iain Fisher	0	0	0+0	0	0+0	0	0+0	0	0+0	0
	DF	(Scotland) SCO	Eddie Malone	45	4	31+0	3	5+0	0	5+0	1	4+0	0
	DF	(Scotland) SCO	Ross Robertson	30	3	9+11	2	1+1	0	1+3	0	2+2	1
	DF	(Scotland) SCO	Chris Smith	49	2	34+0	1	5+0	0	5+0	1	5+0	0
	DF	(Scotland) SCO	John Robertson	39	2	27+0	1	4+0	1	5+0	0	3+0	0
	DF	(Scotland) SCO	Gareth Armstrong	7	0	2+2	0	0+0	0	0+1	0	2+0	0
	DF	(Scotland) SCO	Jackson Longridge	4	0	1+1	0	0+0	0	0+0	0	2+0	0
	MF	(Northern Ireland) NIR	Michael McGowan	46	5	32+0	4	4+1	1	5+0	0	1+3	0
	MF	(Scotland) SCO	Dean Keenan	0	0	0+0	0	0+0	0	0+0	0	0+0	0
	MF	(Scotland) SCO	Sean Kelly	0	0	0+0	0	0+0	0	0+0	0	0+0	0
	MF	(Scotland) SCO	Andy Geggan	47	7	34+0	3	5+0	2	5+0	0	3+0	2
	MF	(Scotland) SCO	Jonathan Tiffoney	44	1	28+2	1	5+0	0	3+1	0	4+1	0
	MF	(Scotland) SCO	Alan Trouten	36	5	16+7	1	4+0	3	4+0	1	4+1	0
	MF	(Scotland) SCO	Alex Burke	6	0	1+2	0	0+0	0	1+0	0	2+0	0
	MF	(Scotland) SCO	Jamie McKernon	30	1	16+4	0	2+2	0	3+0	0	2+1	1
	MF	(Scotland) SCO	Stuart Duff	3	0	3+0	0	0+0	0	0+0	0	0+0	0
	MF	(Republic of Ireland) IRL	Ryan Connolly	12	0	1+8	0	2+0	0	0+0	0	1+0	0
	MF	(England) ENG	Adam Dodd	19	2	13+3	2	2+0	0	0+1	0	0+0	0
	MF	(England) ENG	Liam Tomsett	20	1	15+1	1	2+0	0	0+1	0	1+0	0
	MF	(Scotland) SCO	Steven Hutchinson	2	0	1+1	0	0+0	0	0+0	0	0+0	0
	MF	(Scotland) SCO	Aaron Wyllie	1	0	0+1	0	0+0	0	0+0	0	0+0	0
	MF	(Scotland) SCO	Darren McGill	1	0	1+0	0	0+0	0	0+0	0	0+0	0
	MF	(Scotland) SCO	Robbie Crawford	1	0	1+0	0	0+0	0	0+0	0	0+0	0
	FW	(Scotland) SCO	Tam McManus	6	0	2+3	0	1+0	0	0+0	0	0+0	0
	FW	(Scotland) SCO	Michael Moffat	51	8	31+5	8	5+0	0	5+0	0	4+1	0
	FW	(Scotland) SCO	Dale Moore	0	0	0+0	0	0+0	0	0+0	0	0+0	0
	FW	(Scotland) SCO	Roddy Patterson	5	1	1+1	0	0+0	0	0+1	0	2+0	1
	FW	(Scotland) SCO	Mark Roberts	48	11	27+8	8	5+0	1	2+2	2	2+2	0
	FW	(Scotland) SCO	Gareth Wardlaw	37	3	10+15	2	2+3	0	4+1	1	2+0	0
	FW	(Scotland) SCO	Marc Dyer	0	0	0+0	0	0+0	0	0+0	0	0+0	0
	FW	(Scotland) SCO	Sean Higgins	1	0	1+0	0	0+0	0	0+0	0	0+0	0
	FW	(Scotland) SCO	Keigan Parker	19	5	14+2	5	1+0	0	0+0	0	1+1	0

a. Includes other competitive competitions, including the play-offs and the 2011–12 Scottish Challenge Cup.

=== Disciplinary record ===
Includes all competitive matches.

Last updated 13 May 2012

Nation	Position	Name	Scottish First Division		Scottish Cup		League Cup		Other		Total	
Nation	Position	Name	Booked	Sent off (straight red)	Booked	Sent off (straight red)	Booked	Sent off (straight red)	Booked	Sent off (straight red)	Booked	Sent off (straight red)
(Scotland)	GK	Ryan McWilliams	1	0	0	0	0	0	0	0	1	0
(Scotland)	GK	Kevin Cuthbert	1	0	1	0	0	0	0	0	2	0
(Scotland)	DF	Martyn Campbell	5	1	1	0	0	0	1	0	7	1
(Scotland)	DF	Bobby Donnelly	0	0	0	0	0	0	0	0	0	0
(Scotland)	DF	Iain Fisher	0	0	0	0	0	0	0	0	0	0
(Scotland)	DF	Eddie Malone	7	2	3	0	1	0	0	0	11	2
(Scotland)	DF	Ross Robertson	4	0	1	0	0	0	1	0	6	0
(Scotland)	DF	Chris Smith	3	0	0	0	1	0	0	0	4	0
(Scotland)	DF	John Robertson	3	0	0	0	0	0	0	0	3	0
(Scotland)	DF	Gareth Armstrong	1	0	0	0	0	0	1	0	2	0
(Scotland)	DF	Jackson Longridge	0	0	0	0	0	0	0	1	0	1
(Northern Ireland)	MF	Michael McGowan	6	0	0	0	1	0	0	0	7	0
(Scotland)	MF	Dean Keenan	0	0	0	0	0	0	0	0	0	0
(Scotland)	MF	Sean Kelly	0	0	0	0	0	0	0	0	0	0
(Scotland)	MF	Andy Geggan	9	0	1	0	1	0	1	0	12	0
(Scotland)	MF	Jonathan Tiffoney	5	1	2	0	0	0	4	1	11	2
(Scotland)	MF	Alan Trouten	5	0	1	0	1	0	1	0	8	0
(Scotland)	MF	Alex Burke	0	0	0	0	0	0	0	0	0	0
(Scotland)	MF	Jamie McKernon	4	0	0	0	0	0	0	0	4	0
(Scotland)	MF	Ryan Connolly	0	0	0	0	0	0	0	0	0	0
(Scotland)	MF	Stuart Duff	1	0	0	0	0	0	0	0	1	0
(Republic of Ireland)	MF	Ryan Connolly	0	0	0	0	0	0	0	0	0	0
(England)	MF	Adam Dodd	2	1	0	0	0	0	0	0	2	1
(England)	MF	Liam Tomsett	6	0	1	0	0	0	1	0	8	0
(Scotland)	MF	Steven Hutchinson	0	0	0	0	0	0	0	0	0	0
(England)	MF	Aaron Wyllie	0	0	0	0	0	0	0	0	0	0
(England)	MF	Darren McGill	0	0	0	0	0	0	0	0	0	0
(Scotland)	MF	Robbie Crawford	0	0	0	0	0	0	0	0	0	0
(Scotland)	FW	Tam McManus	2	0	0	0	0	0	0	0	2	0
(Scotland)	FW	Michael Moffat	3	0	0	0	1	0	0	0	4	0
(Scotland)	FW	Dale Moore	0	0	0	0	0	0	0	0	0	0
(Scotland)	FW	Roddy Patterson	0	0	0	0	0	0	0	0	0	0
(Scotland)	FW	Mark Roberts	5	0	0	0	0	0	0	0	5	0
(Scotland)	FW	Gareth Wardlaw	4	0	0	0	1	0	0	0	5	0
(Scotland)	FW	Marc Dyer	0	0	0	0	0	0	0	0	0	0
(Scotland)	FW	Sean Higgins	0	0	0	0	0	0	0	0	0	0
(Scotland)	FW	Keigan Parker	5	0	0	0	0	0	0	0	5	0

== Team stats ==
=== League table ===
Pos	Team	Pld	W	D	L	GF	GA	GD	Pts	Promotion, qualification or relegation
6	Partick Thistle	36	12	11	13	50	39	+11	47	
7	Raith Rovers	36	11	11	14	46	49	−3	44	
8	Greenock Morton	36	10	12	14	40	55	−15	42	
9	Ayr United (R)	36	9	11	16	44	67	−23	38	Qualification for the First Division play-offs
10	Queen of the South (R)	36	7	11	18	38	64	−26	32	Relegation to the Second Division

Source: SPFL Archive
Rules for classification: 1) points; 2) goal difference; 3) number of goals scored.
(R) Relegated

=== Results by round ===
Round	1	2	3	4	5	6	7	8	9	10	11	12	13	14	15	16	17	18	19	20	21	22	23	24	25	26	27	28	29	30	31	32	33	34	35	36
Ground	H	A	H	H	A	A	H	A	H	H	A	H	A	H	A	H	A	A	H	H	A	A	H	H	H	A	A	H	A	A	H	H	A	A	H	A
Result	L	D	D	W	L	L	W	L	D	L	W	L	W	D	L	D	L	D	D	D	D	L	W	L	W	W	D	D	L	L	L	L	W	L	W	L
Position	8	7	8	5	9	10	8	10	8	10	8	9	8	8	9	9	9	9	9	10	10	10	9	9	9	8	8	8	8	8	9	9	9	9	9	9

Updated to match(es) played on 5 May 2012. Source: Statto.com
A = Away; H = Home; W = Win; D = Draw; L = Loss

== Club ==
=== Coaching staff ===
Position	Staff
Manager	(Scotland) Brian Reid
Assistant First Team Manager	(Scotland) Scott Mackenzie
First Team Fitness Coach	(Scotland) David Johnston
Groundsman	(Scotland) David Harkness

Last updated: 7 August 2011
Source: Ayr United

=== Other information ===
Chairman	(United States) Lachlan Cameron
Vice Chairman	Alex Ingram
Ground (capacity and dimensions)	Somerset Park (10,185 / 100x66 metres)

Updated to match played 7 August 2011
Source: Ayr United

== Transfers ==
=== In ===
No.	Pos.	Nat.	Name	Age	EU	Moving from	Type	Transfer window	Ends	Transfer fee	Source
	GK	(Scotland)	Kevin Cuthbert	43	EU	Greenock Morton	Free Transfer ✓	Summer		Free	
	FW	(Scotland)	Gareth Wardlaw	46	EU	St Mirren	Free Transfer ✓	Summer		Free	
	MF	(Northern Ireland)	Michael McGowan	40	EU	Alloa Athletic	Free Transfer ✓	Summer		Free	
	MF	(Scotland)	Andy Geggan	38	EU	Dumbarton	Free Transfer ✓	Summer		Free	
	DF	(Scotland)	John Robertson	49	EU	Partick Thistle	Free Transfer ✓	Summer		Free	
	MF	(Scotland)	Alex Burke	47	EU	Dunfermline Athletic	Free Transfer ✓	Summer		Free	
	MF	(Scotland)	Jamie McKernon	33	EU	St Mirren	Loan →	Summer	January 2012, later extend to May 2012	Loan	
	MF	(Republic of Ireland)	Ryan Connolly	33	EU	Derby County (England)	Loan →	Summer	December 2011	Loan	
	FW	(Scotland)	Tam McManus	44	EU	Falkirk	Free Transfer ✓	Between Windows		Free	
	MF	(England)	Adam Dodd	32	EU	Blackpool	Loan →	Winter	May 2012	Loan	
	MF	(England)	Liam Tomsett	32	EU	Blackpool	Loan →	Winter	May 2012	Loan	
	FW	(Scotland)	Sean Higgins	40	EU	St Johnstone	Loan →	Winter	May 2012	Loan	
	FW	(Scotland)	Marc Dyer	30	EU	Rangers	Loan →	Winter	May 2012	Loan	
	FW	(Scotland)	Keigan Parker	43	EU	A.F.C. Fylde (England)	Free Transfer ✓	Winter	May 2012	Free	

Total spending: £0 million

=== Out ===
No.	Pos.	Nat.	Name	Age	EU	Moving to	Type	Transfer window	Transfer fee	Source
	FW	(Scotland)	Andy Rodgers	42	EU	Stenhousemuir	Contract Termination ✗	Summer	Free	
	LWB	(Scotland)	William Easton	39	EU	Kirkintilloch Rob Roy	Contract Termination ✗	Summer	Free	
	GK	(Scotland)	David Crawford	40	EU	Clyde	Contract Termination ✗	Summer	Free	
	MF	(Scotland)	Alistair Woodburn	35	EU	Airdrie United	Contract Termination ✗	Summer	Free	
	GK	(Scotland)	Alan Martin	36	EU	Crewe Alexandra (England)	Contract Termination ✗	Summer	Free	
	DF	(Scotland)	Jim Lauchlan	48	EU	Free agent	Contract Termination ✗	Summer	Free	
	FW	(Scotland)	Aaron Connelly	34	EU	Cumnock Juniors	Contract Termination ✗	Summer	Free	
	MF	(Scotland)	Scott McLaughlin	41	EU	Queen of the South	Contract Termination ✗	Summer	Free	
	MF	(Scotland)	Ryan McCann	44	EU	Stockport County (England)	Contract Termination ✗	Summer	Free	
	MF	(Scotland)	Robert Donnelly	38	EU	Kirkintilloch Rob Roy	Contract Termination ✗	Summer	Free	
	GK	(Scotland)	Darryl Jones	33	EU	Cumnock Juniors	Contract Termination ✗	Summer	Free	
	MF	(Scotland)	Alex Burke	47	EU	Free agent	Contract Termination ✗	Winter	Free	
	FW	(Scotland)	Tam McManus	44	EU	Rochester Rhinos (United States)	Contract Termination ✗	Winter	Free	
	DF	(Scotland)	Dean Keenan	39	EU	Troon	Contract Termination ✗	Winter	Free	
	DF	(Scotland)	Alan Murdoch		EU	Lugar Boswell Thistle	Loan →	Winter	Loan	

Total Income: £0.00 million

Expenditure: £0.00 million
