= 2012–13 Ayr United F.C. season =

Ayr United
2012–13 season
- Chairman: Lachlan Cameron
- Manager: Mark Roberts
- Stadium: Somerset Park
- Second Division: Seventh place
- Challenge Cup: First round, lost to East Stirlingshire
- League Cup: Second round, lost to St Mirren
- Scottish Cup: Fourth round, lost to Forfar Athletic
- Top goalscorer: League: Michael Moffat (16); All: Michael Moffat (21)
- Highest home attendance: 1,373 vs Queen of the South; Second Division; 15 September 2012
- Lowest home attendance: 631 vs Brechin City; Second Division; 5 March 2013
Home colours	Away colours

The 2012–13 season was Ayr United's first season back in the Scottish Second Division, after being relegated from the Scottish First Division at the end of the 2011–12 season after their two legged semi final play-off defeat to Airdrie United. Ayr also competed in the Challenge Cup, League Cup and the Scottish Cup.

== Summary ==
=== Season ===
Ayr United finished Seventh in the Scottish Second Division. They reached the first round of the Challenge Cup, the second round of the League Cup and the fourth round of the Scottish Cup.

=== Management ===
Ayr will be managed by Mark Roberts for the 2012–13 season, following the departure of Brian Reid whose contract with the club had expired.

== Results and fixtures ==
Win Draw Loss Postponed

=== Preseason ===
10 July 2012 Friendly	Queen's Park	1 – 1	Ayr United	Lesser Hampden, Glasgow
	Shankland	Ayr United Report	Moffat 65'	Attendance: 0

14 July 2012 Friendly	Ayr United	4 – 0	Motherwell	Somerset Park, Ayr
15:00	Robertson 19'; Moffat 24'; Campbell 47'; Sinclair 71'	Motherwell Report; Ayr United Report		Attendance: 825; Referee: Steven McLean

16 July 2012 Friendly	Ayr United	1 – 4	Partick Thistle	Somerset Park, Ayr
19:45	Trialist 34'	Ayr United Report; Partick Thistle Report	Welsh 10'; Lawless 76', 89'; Elliott 82'

18 July 2012 Friendly	Ayr United	1 – 1	Bolton Wanderers	Somerset Park, Ayr
19:45	Roberts 78'		Alonso 70'

21 July 2012 Friendly	Ayr United	1–1	Glentoran	Somerset Park, Ayr
17:00	McStay	Glentoran Report	Nixon

=== Scottish Second Division ===
11 August 2012 Scottish Second Division	Ayr United	1 – 1	Stenhousemuir	Somerset Park
15:00	Winters 19'	SFL Report	McMillan 90'	Attendance: 1,248; Referee: O'Reilly

18 August 2012 Scottish Second Division	Arbroath	4 – 2	Ayr United	Gayfield Park
15:00	Holmes 45'; Kerr 46'; Gribben 72'; Rennie 83'	SFL Report	Sinclair 22'; Holmes 67' (Own goal)	Attendance: 714; Referee: Northcroft

25 August 2012 Scottish Second Division	Ayr United	2 – 3	Forfar Athletic	Somerset Park
15:00	Sinclair 6', 52'	SFL Report	Campbell 45' (Penalty); Swankie 59'; Fotheringham 89'	Attendance: 1,094; Referee: Somers

1 September 2012 Scottish Second Division	Stranraer	2 – 0	Ayr United	Stair Park
15:00	Malcolm 34', 38'	SFL Report	Hunter (yellow card) 90' (red card)	Attendance: 772; Referee: Cook

15 September 2012 Scottish Second Division	Ayr United	2 – 4	Queen of the South	Somerset Park
15:00	MacKinnon 9', 19'	SFL Report	Clark 16'; Burns 31'; Reilly 62', 69'	Attendance: 1,373; Referee: Muir

22 September 2012 Scottish Second Division	East Fife	2 – 3	Ayr United	Bayview Stadium
15:00	Pollock 5'; Barr 83'	SFL Report	Sinclair 9', 34'; McAusland 88'	Attendance: 575; Referee: Hilland

29 September 2012 Scottish Second Division	Ayr United	3 – 0	Brechin City	Somerset Park
15:00	McCann (red card) 15'; Moffat 26'; Twaddle 53'; Sinclair 68'	SFL Report		Attendance: 993; Referee: Robertson

6 October 2012 Scottish Second Division	Ayr United	2 – 1	Albion Rovers	Somerset Park
15:00	Moffat 2' (Penalty), 94' (Penalty)	SFL Report	Howarth 45+1'; Russell (red card) 94'	Attendance: 1,023; Referee: Murray

20 October 2012 Scottish Second Division	Alloa Athletic	1 – 0	Ayr United	Recreation Park
15:00	Gordon 45'	SFL Report		Attendance: 595; Referee: Robertson

27 October 2012 Scottish Second Division	Ayr United	2 – 0	Arbroath	Somerset Park
15:00	MacKinnon 16'; Moffat 90'	SFL Report		Attendance: 1,062; Referee: Dallas

10 November 2012 Scottish Second Division	Stenhousemuir	1 – 1	Ayr United	Ochilview Park
15:00	Smith 84'	SFL Report	Moffat 68'	Attendance: 586; Referee: O'Reilly

17 November 2012 Scottish Second Division	Ayr United	2 – 1	Stranraer	Somerset Park
15:00	Moffat 57' (pen.), 90'; McStay (red card) 81'	SFL Report	Moore 31'	Attendance: 1,006; Referee: Hilland

24 November 2012 Scottish Second Division	Queen of the South	2 – 0	Ayr United	Palmerston Park
15:00	McGuffie 16'; Clark 55'	SFL Report		Attendance: 1,953; Referee: Anderson

8 December 2012 Scottish Second Division	Brechin City	P – P	Ayr United	Glebe Park
15:00		BBC Report

15 December 2012 Scottish Second Division	Ayr United	2 – 3	East Fife	Somerset Park
15:00	White 3' (o.g.); McAusland 17'	SFL Report	McBride 56', 65' (pen.); White 89'	Attendance: 943; Referee: Aitken

22 December 2012 Scottish Second Division	Brechin City	P – P	Ayr United	Glebe Park
15:00		BBC Report

26 December 2012 Scottish Second Division	Albion Rovers	2 – 0	Ayr United	Cliftonhill
15:00	Stevenson 24'; Elliott 69'; Elliott (red card) 76'	SFL Report		Attendance: 509; Referee: Northcroft

29 December 2012 Scottish Second Division	Ayr United	0 – 0	Alloa Athletic	Somerset Park
15:00		SFL Report		Attendance: 927; Referee: Robertson

2 January 2013 Scottish Second Division	Ayr United	1 – 5	Queen of the South	Somerset Park
15:00	Winters 30'	BBC Sport	McStay 32' (o.g.); Clark 43'; Carmichael 47'; McCann 69' (o.g.); Lyle 72'	Attendance: 1,216; Referee: Dallas

5 January 2013 Scottish Second Division	Stranraer	0 – 1	Ayr United	Stair Park
15:00		SFL Report; Ayr Report	Winters 38'	Attendance: 803; Referee: Madden

12 January 2013 Scottish Second Division	Forfar Athletic	2 – 1	Ayr United	Station Park
15:00	Robertson 9' (Own goal); Swankie 52'	SFL Report	Sinclair 48'	Attendance: 479; Referee: Hilland

19 January 2013 Scottish Second Division	Ayr United	P – P	Stenhousemuir	Somerset Park
15:00		BBC Report
Note: Postponed due to frozen pitch

26 January 2013 Scottish Second Division	East Fife	3 – 3	Ayr United	Bayview Stadium
15:00	White 26'; McManus 34', 45+1'	SFL Report	Moffat 5'; McAusland 17'; McDonald 85'	Attendance: 514; Referee: Robertson

2 February 2013 Scottish Second Division	Ayr United	P – P	Brechin City	Somerset Park
15:00		BBC Report
Note: Postponed due to frozen pitch

9 February 2013 Scottish Second Division	Alloa Athletic	2 – 2	Ayr United	Recreation Park
15:00	Megginson 63'; Gordon 90+2'	SFL Report	Buchanan 36'; McGregor 57'; Buchanan (yellow card) 78' (yellow-red card)	Attendance: 521; Referee: Cook

16 February 2013 Scottish Second Division	Ayr United	5 – 2	Albion Rovers	Somerset Park
15:00	Donald 18', 56'; Moffat 25' (Penalty), 59', 67'	SFL Report	Robbie Winters 42', 84'	Attendance: 1,064; Referee: McKendrick

19 February 2013 Scottish Second Division	Brechin City	2 – 1	Ayr United	Glebe Park
19:45	McLauchlan 40', 59'	SFL Report	Moyes 56' (Own goal)	Attendance: 412; Referee: Graham

23 February 2013 Scottish Second Division	Ayr United	2 – 1	Forfar Athletic	Somerset Park
15:00	Buchanan 19'; Donald 69'	SFL Report	Campbell 74' (Penalty)	Attendance: 1,008; Referee: Brines

26 February 2013 Scottish Second Division	Ayr United	1 – 2	Stenhousemuir	Somerset Park
19:45	Winters 33'	SFL Report	Dickson 60'; Corcoran 90+2'	Attendance: 821; Referee: Muir

2 March 2013 Scottish Second Division	Arbroath	1 – 4	Ayr United	Gayfield Park
15:00	Homes 2'; Kerr (yellow card) 54' (yellow-red card)	SFL Report	Moffat 41' (Penalty), 43', 72' (Penalty), 75'	Attendance: 651; Referee: Dallas

5 March 2013 Scottish Second Division	Ayr United	1 – 2	Brechin City	Somerset Park
19:45	Buchanan 50'	SFL Report	Moyes 25'; Hay 75'	Attendance: 631; Referee: Roache

9 March 2013 Scottish Second Division	Queen of the South	2 – 0	Ayr United	Palmerston Park
15:00	Lyle 45'; Reilly 60'	SFL Report		Attendance: 1,471; Referee: Charleston

16 March 2013 Scottish Second Division	Ayr United	2 – 1	Stranraer	Somerset Park
15:00	Hunter 8'; Donald 11'	SFL Report	Malcolm 68'	Attendance: 1,022; Referee: Hilland

23 March 2013 Scottish Second Division	Brechin City	2 – 1	Ayr United	Station Park
15:00	Carcary 15'; Trouten 19'	SFL Report	Buchanan 61'; McGregor (yellow card) 75' (yellow-red card)	Attendance: 427; Referee: Northcroft

30 March 2013 Scottish Second Division	Ayr United	2 – 1	East Fife	Somerset Park
15:00	Buchanan 79'; Winters 87'	SFL Report	Durie 15'	Attendance: 956; Referee: Robertson

6 April 2013 Scottish Second Division	Ayr United	0 – 2	Alloa Athletic	Somerset Park
15:00		SFL Report	McCord 27'; Holmes 90'	Attendance: 898; Referee: McLean

13 April 2013 Scottish Second Division	Albion Rovers	1 – 3	Ayr United	Cliftonhill Stadium
15:00	Dallas 57'	SFL Report	Moffat 31'; Buchanan 40'; McLaughlin 84'	Attendance: 475; Referee: Colvin

20 April 2013 Scottish Second Division	Stenhousemuir	4 – 0	Ayr United	Ochilview Park
15:00	Dickson 5'; Gemmell 20', 42' (Penalty); Smith 56'	SFL Report	Smith (red card) 42'	Attendance: 497; Referee: Somers

27 April 2013 Scottish Second Division	Ayr United	0 – 1	Arbroath	Somerset Park
15:00		SFL Report	Smith 60'	Attendance: 834; Referee: Aitken

4 May 2013 Scottish Second Division	Forfar Athletic	2 – 1	Ayr United	Station Park
15:00	Templeman 12'; Campbell 45' (Penalty)	SFL Report	Bolochoweckyj 36' (Own goal); Brownlie (red card) 44'	Attendance: 622; Referee: Charleston

=== Scottish Challenge Cup ===
28 July 2012 Scottish Challenge Cup round 1	East Stirlingshire	3 – 1	Ayr United	Ochilview Park
15:00	Herd 28', 42'; Maxwell 86'	SFL Report	Shankland 51'	Attendance: 493; Referee: Cook

=== Scottish League Cup ===
4 August 2012 Scottish League Cup round 1	Ayr United	6 – 1	Clyde	Somerset Park, Ayr
15:00	Winters 48'; Moffat 59', 90' (Penalty); Tiffoney 63'; Sinclair 68', 90'	SFL Report	Neil 82'	Attendance: 1,022; Referee: Anderson

29 August 2012 Scottish League Cup round 2	St Mirren	5 – 1	Ayr United	St Mirren Park
19:45	Guy 16'; Thompson 24'; McGowan 30'; McLean 38' (Penalty); Teale 58'	BBC Report	Moffat 39'	Attendance: 2,306; Referee: Tumilty

=== Scottish Cup ===
3 November 2012 Scottish Cup round 3	Ayr United	2 – 1	Clachnacuddin	Somerset Park
15:00	Moffat 50', 60' (pen.)	BBC Report	Graham 14'	Attendance: 1,032; Referee: Somers

1 December 2012 Scottish Cup round 4	Forfar Athletic	2 – 1	Ayr United	Station Park
15:00	Robertson 59'; King 74'	BBC Report	Sinclair 16'	Attendance: 505; Referee: Salmond

== Player statistics ==
=== Squad statistics ===
Last updated 12 May 2013

No.	Pos	Nat	Player	Total		Second Division		Challenge Cup		League Cup		Scottish Cup	
No.	Pos	Nat	Player	Apps	Goals	Apps	Goals	Apps	Goals	Apps	Goals	Apps	Goals
	GK	(Scotland) SCO	Alistair Brown	24	0	19+0	0	1+0	0	2+0	0	2+0	0
	GK	(Scotland) SCO	Darren Martin	2	0	2+0	0	0+0	0	0+0	0	0+0	0
	GK	(Scotland) SCO	Willie Muir	0	0	0+0	0	0+0	0	0+0	0	0+0	0
	GK	(Scotland) SCO	Graeme Smith	15	0	15+0	0	0+0	0	0+0	0	0+0	0
	DF	(Scotland) SCO	Gareth Armstrong	0	0	0+0	0	0+0	0	0+0	0	0+0	0
	DF	(Scotland) SCO	Darren Brownlie	20	0	15+1	0	1+0	0	2+0	0	0+1	0
	DF	(Scotland) SCO	Martyn Campbell	4	0	2+0	0	0+0	0	2+0	0	0+0	0
	DF	(England) ENG	Michael Donald	20	4	19+1	4	0+0	0	0+0	0	0+0	0
	DF	(Scotland) SCO	Adam Hunter	29	1	23+3	1	0+0	0	1+0	0	2+0	0
	DF	(Scotland) SCO	Jackson Longridge	3	0	2+1	0	0+0	0	0+0	0	0+0	0
	DF	(Scotland) SCO	Cameron MacDonald	1	1	1+0	1	0+0	0	0+0	0	0+0	0
	DF	(Scotland) SCO	Anthony Marenghi	16	0	8+4	0	1+0	0	2+0	0	0+1	0
	DF	(Scotland) SCO	Austin McCann	35	0	30+0	0	1+0	0	2+0	0	2+0	0
	DF	(Scotland) SCO	Kyle McAusland	26	3	24+1	3	0+0	0	0+0	0	1+0	0
	DF	(Scotland) SCO	Neil McGregor	14	1	14+0	1	0+0	0	0+0	0	0+0	0
	DF	(Scotland) SCO	Ross Robertson	17	0	3+10	0	1+0	0	0+1	0	0+2	0
	DF	(Scotland) SCO	John Robertson	23	0	19+1	0	1+0	0	0+0	0	2+0	0
	DF	(Scotland) SCO	Chris Smith	14	0	13+1	0	0+0	0	0+0	0	0+0	0
	DF	(Scotland) SCO	Marc Twaddle	20	1	16+1	1	0+0	0	0+1	0	2+0	0
	MF	(Scotland) SCO	Robbie Crawford	38	0	33+1	0	0+1	0	1+0	0	2+0	0
	MF	(Scotland) SCO	Steven Hutchinson	0	0	0+0	0	0+0	0	0+0	0	0+0	0
	MF	(Scotland) SCO	Darren McGill	3	0	2+1	0	0+0	0	0+0	0	0+0	0
	MF	(Northern Ireland) NIR	Michael McGowan	5	0	1+2	0	0+0	0	2+0	0	0+0	0
	MF	(Scotland) SCO	Scott McLaughlin	8	1	8+0	1	0+0	0	0+0	0	0+0	0
	MF	(Northern Ireland) NIR	Ryan McStay	22	0	13+6	0	0+1	0	1+0	0	1+0	0
	MF	(Scotland) SCO	David Sinclair	31	10	26+1	7	1+0	0	2+0	2	1+0	1
	MF	(Scotland) SCO	Jonathan Tiffoney	2	1	0+0	0	1+0	0	1+0	1	0+0	0
	MF	(Scotland) SCO	Michael Wardrobe	2	0	0+2	0	0+0	0	0+0	0	0+0	0
	MF	(Scotland) SCO	Aaron Wyllie	9	0	5+3	0	0+0	0	0+0	0	1+0	0
	FW	(Scotland) SCO	Liam Buchanan	14	6	14+0	6	0+0	0	0+0	0	0+0	0
	FW	(Scotland) SCO	Darian MacKinnon	8	3	8+0	3	0+0	0	0+0	0	0+0	0
	FW	(Scotland) SCO	Michael Moffat	39	21	34+0	16	1+0	0	2+0	3	2+0	2
	FW	(Scotland) SCO	Ryan Nisbet	1	0	0+1	0	0+0	0	0+0	0	0+0	0
	FW	(Scotland) SCO	Roddy Patterson	0	0	0+0	0	0+0	0	0+0	0	0+0	0
	FW	(Scotland) SCO	Mark Roberts	18	0	6+9	0	0+1	0	0+0	0	2+0	0
	FW	(Scotland) SCO	Mark Shankland	18	1	5+9	0	1+0	1	1+1	0	1+0	0
	FW	(Scotland) SCO	David Winters	36	6	15+17	5	0+0	0	1+1	1	1+1	0

=== Disciplinary record ===
Includes all competitive matches.

Last updated 12 May 2013

Nation	Position	Name	Second Division		Challenge Cup		League Cup		Scottish Cup		Total	
Nation	Position	Name	Booked	Sent off (straight red)	Booked	Sent off (straight red)	Booked	Sent off (straight red)	Booked	Sent off (straight red)	Booked	Sent off (straight red)
(Scotland)	GK	Alistair Brown	0	0	0	0	0	0	0	0	0	0
(Scotland)	GK	Darren Martin	0	0	0	0	0	0	0	0	0	0
(Scotland)	GK	Willie Muir	0	0	0	0	0	0	0	0	0	0
(Scotland)	GK	Graeme Smith	2	0	0	0	0	0	0	0	2	0
(Scotland)	DF	Gareth Armstrong	0	0	0	0	0	0	0	0	0	0
(Scotland)	DF	Darren Brownlie	1	1	0	0	1	0	0	0	2	1
(Scotland)	DF	Martyn Campbell	0	0	0	0	0	0	0	0	0	0
(England)	DF	Michael Donald	1	0	0	0	0	0	0	0	1	0
(Scotland)	DF	Adam Hunter	8	1	0	0	1	0	0	0	9	1
(Scotland)	DF	Jackson Longridge	0	0	0	0	0	0	0	0	0	0
(Scotland)	DF	Cameron MacDonald	0	0	0	0	0	0	0	0	0	0
(Scotland)	DF	Anthony Marenghi	1	0	0	0	1	0	0	0	2	0
(Scotland)	DF	Austin McCann	0	1	0	0	0	0	1	0	1	1
(Scotland)	DF	Kyle McAusland	8	0	0	0	0	0	0	0	8	0
(Scotland)	DF	Neil McGregor	6	1	0	0	0	0	0	0	6	1
(Scotland)	DF	Ross Robertson	3	0	0	0	0	0	1	0	4	0
(Scotland)	DF	John Robertson	3	0	0	0	0	0	0	0	3	0
(Scotland)	DF	Chris Smith	2	1	0	0	0	0	0	0	2	1
(Scotland)	DF	Marc Twaddle	1	0	0	0	0	0	0	0	1	0
(Scotland)	MF	Robbie Crawford	8	0	1	0	0	0	0	0	8	0
(Scotland)	MF	Steven Hutchinson	0	0	0	0	0	0	0	0	0	0
(Scotland)	MF	Darren McGill	1	0	0	0	0	0	0	0	1	0
(Northern Ireland)	MF	Michael McGowan	1	0	0	0	0	0	0	0	1	0
(Scotland)	MF	Scott McLaughlin	2	0	0	0	0	0	0	0	2	0
(Northern Ireland)	MF	Ryan McStay	3	1	0	0	0	0	0	0	3	1
(Scotland)	MF	David Sinclair	0	0	0	0	0	0	0	0	0	0
(Scotland)	MF	Jonathan Tiffoney	0	0	1	0	0	0	0	0	1	0
(Scotland)	MF	Michael Wardrobe	0	0	0	0	0	0	0	0	0	0
(Scotland)	MF	Aaron Wyllie	1	0	0	0	0	0	0	0	1	0
(Scotland)	FW	Liam Buchanan	3	1	0	0	0	0	0	0	3	1
(Scotland)	FW	Darian MacKinnon	2	0	0	0	0	0	0	0	2	0
(Scotland)	FW	Michael Moffat	6	0	0	0	0	0	0	0	6	0
(Scotland)	FW	Ryan Nisbet	0	0	0	0	0	0	0	0	0	0
(Scotland)	FW	Roddy Patterson	0	0	0	0	0	0	0	0	0	0
(Scotland)	FW	Mark Roberts	4	0	0	0	0	0	0	0	4	0
(Scotland)	FW	Mark Shankland	0	0	0	0	0	0	0	0	0	0
(Scotland)	FW	David Winters	1	0	0	0	0	0	1	0	2	0

== Team statistics ==
=== League table ===
Pos	Team	Pld	W	D	L	GF	GA	GD	Pts	Promotion, qualification or relegation
5	Arbroath	36	15	7	14	47	57	−10	52	
6	Stenhousemuir	36	12	13	11	59	59	0	49	
7	Ayr United	36	12	5	19	53	65	−12	41	
8	Stranraer	36	10	7	19	43	71	−28	37	
9	East Fife (O)	36	8	8	20	50	65	−15	32	Qualification for the Second Division play-offs

Source: SPFL Archive
Rules for classification: 1) points; 2) goal difference; 3) number of goals scored.
(O) Play-off winners

=== Division summary ===
Round	1	2	3	4	5	6	7	8	9	10	11	12	13	14	15	16	17	18	19	20	21	22	23	24	25	26	27	28	29	30	31	32	33	34	35	36
Ground	H	A	H	A	H	A	H	H	A	H	A	H	A	H	A	A	H	A	A	A	A	H	A	H	H	A	H	A	H	A	H	H	H	A	H	A
Result	D	L	L	L	L	W	W	W	L	W	D	W	L	L	L	D	L	W	L	D	D	W	L	W	L	W	L	L	W	L	W	L	W	L	L	L
Position	5	8	9	10	10	9	6	6	7	6	6	4	6	8	8	8	8	8	8	8	8	8	8	7	7	7	7	7	7	7	6	6	6	7	7	7

Updated to match(es) played on 12 May 2013. Source:
A = Away; H = Home; W = Win; D = Draw; L = Loss

== Club ==
=== Coaching staff ===
Position	Staff
Manager	(Scotland) Mark Roberts
Assistant First Team Manager	(Scotland) David White
First Team Fitness Coach	(Scotland) David Johnston
Groundsman	(Scotland) David Harkness

Last updated: 13 May 2012
Source: Ayr United

=== Other information ===
Chairman	(United States) Lachlan Cameron
Vice Chairman	Alex Ingram
Ground (capacity and dimensions)	Somerset Park (10,185 / 100x66 metres)

Updated to match played 13 May 2012

== Transfers ==
=== Players in ===
Player	From	Fee
(Scotland) Ryan McStay	(Scotland) Albion Rovers	Free
(Scotland) Austin McCann	(Scotland) Dunfermline Athletic	Free
(Scotland) David Sinclair	(Scotland) Livingston	Free
(Scotland) Anthony Marenghi	(Scotland) Rangers	Free
(Scotland) Alistair Brown	(Scotland) Stenhousemuir	Free
(Scotland) Darren Brownlie	(Scotland) Motherwell	Free
(Scotland) David Winters	(Scotland) Annan Athletic	Free
(Scotland) Darren Martin	(Scotland) Dalbeattie Star	Free
(Scotland) Kyle McAusland	(Scotland) Rangers	Loan
(Scotland) Darian MacKinnon	(Scotland) Hamilton Academical	Loan
(Scotland) Marc Twaddle	(England) Rochdale	Free
(Scotland) Adam Hunter	(Scotland) Rangers	Free
(Scotland) Willie Muir	(Scotland) Motherwell	Free
(Scotland) Liam Buchanan	(Scotland) Airdrie United	Free
(Scotland) Neil McGregor	(Scotland) Dundee	Loan
(Scotland) Chris Smith	(Scotland) Falkirk	Loan
(Scotland) Scott McLaughlin	(Scotland) Peterhead	Loan

=== Players out ===
Player	To	Fee
(Scotland) Eddie Malone	(Scotland) Raith Rovers	Free
(Scotland) Gareth Wardlaw	(Scotland) East Fife	Free
(Scotland) Ryan McWilliams	(Scotland) Albion Rovers	Free
(Scotland) Kevin Cuthbert	(Scotland) Hamilton Academical	Free
(Scotland) Andy Geggan	(Scotland) Dunfermline Athletic	Free
(Scotland) Chris Smith	(Scotland) Falkirk	Free
(Scotland) Alan Trouten	(Scotland) Brechin City	Free
(Scotland) Roddy Patterson	(Scotland) Cumnock Juniors	Loan
(Scotland) Keigan Parker	(Republic of Ireland) Cork City	Free
(Scotland) Darren Martin	Free Agent	Free
(Scotland) Jonathan Tiffoney	(Scotland) Alloa Athletic	Free
