= 2010–11 Dumbarton F.C. season =

Dumbarton
2010–11 season
- Chairman: Colin Hosie; Alan Jardine
- Manager: Jim Chapman; Alan Adamson
- Stadium: Strathclyde Homes Stadium
- Scottish Second Division: Seventh place
- Challenge Cup: First round, lost to Greenock Morton
- League Cup: First round, lost to Queen of the South
- Scottish Cup: Third round, lost to Greenock Morton
- Top goalscorer: League: Jon McShane (13); All: Jon McShane (13)
- Highest home attendance: 853 vs. Livingston, 5 March 2011
- Lowest home attendance: 350 vs. Alloa Athletic, 18 January 2011
- Average home league attendance: 624

The 2010–11 season was Dumbarton's second consecutive season in the Scottish Second Division, having been promoted from the Scottish Third Division at the end of the 2008–09 season. Dumbarton also competed in the Challenge Cup, League Cup and the Scottish Cup.

== Summary ==
Dumbarton finished seventh in the Second Division. They reached the first of the Scottish Challenge Cup, the first round of the League Cup and the third round of the Scottish Cup.

=== Management ===
Dumbarton began the 2010–11 season under the management of Jim Chapman. On 27 October 2010, Chapman resigned as manager, with Alan Adamson being appointed as interim manager. In April 2011, after six months as interim manager Adamson was appointed on a permanent basis.

== Results & fixtures ==
Win Draw Loss

=== Scottish Second Division ===
7 August 2010 Scottish Second Division	Forfar Athletic	4–1	Dumbarton	Station Park
	R Campbell 2'; Hilson 51'; Templeman 59', 77' (Penalty)	BBC Report	Chaplain 5' (Penalty)	Attendance: 510; Referee: McKendrick

14 August 2010 Scottish Second Division	Dumbarton	1–2	Livingston	Strathclyde Homes Stadium
15:00	Chaplain 70' (pen.)	BBC Report	Winters 25' (pen.); O'Byrne (yellow card) 71' (red card); Russell 77'	Attendance: 643; Referee: Watters

21 August 2010 Scottish Second Division	Ayr United	1–0	Dumbarton	Somerset Park
	Maxwell 35' (Own goal)	BBC Report		Attendance: 1,242; Referee: Smith

28 August 2010 Scottish Second Division	East Fife	6–0	Dumbarton	Bayview Stadium
	Young 15'; Byrne 35', 44', 71'; Linn 59'; Sloan 83'	BBC Report		Attendance: 687; Referee: Norris

11 September 2010 Scottish Second Division	Dumbarton	1–0	Stenhousemuir	Strathclyde Homes Stadium
	Carcary 77'	BBC Report		Attendance: 600; Referee: Charleston

18 September 2010 Scottish Second Division	Alloa Athletic	0–0	Dumbarton	Recreation Park
		BBC Report		Attendance: 559; Referee: Nicholls

25 September 2010 Scottish Second Division	Dumbarton	1–3	Brechin City	Strathclyde Homes Stadium
	Carcary 73'	BBC Report	Booth 36'; McKenna 40'; McAllister 88'	Attendance: 626; Referee: Beaton

2 October 2010 Scottish Second Division	Dumbarton	1–3	Airdrie United	Strathclyde Homes Stadium
	Maxwell 67'	SFL Report	McCord 52'; Wallace 62'; Gemmill 74'	Attendance: 812; Referee: Richmond

16 October 2010 Scottish Second Division	Peterhead	1–0	Dumbarton	Balmoor
	Ross 49'	SFL Report		Attendance: 496; Referee: Hilland

23 October 2010 Scottish Second Division	Stenhousemuir	4–0	Dumbarton	Ochilview Park
	Quinn 3'; Clark 22' (pen.), 43'; Plenderleith 89'	BBC Report		Attendance: 392; Referee: Northcroft

30 October 2010 Scottish Second Division	Dumbarton	4–1	East Fife	Strathclyde Homes Stadium
	McShane 31'; Durie 47' (Own goal); Gilhaney 89', 92'	BBC Report	Byrne 39'	Attendance: 585; Referee: Law

6 November 2010 Scottish Second Division	Livingston	2–0	Dumbarton	Braidwood Motor Company Stadium
15:00	Watson 19'; Russell 87'	BBC Report		Attendance: 1,417; Referee: Clancy

13 November 2010 Scottish Second Division	Dumbarton	3–2	Ayr United	Strathclyde Homes Stadium
	Cook 29' (Penalty); Walker 54'; R Campbell 84'	BBC Report	Tiffoney (red card) 28'; Roberts 66'; Rodgers 91'	Attendance: 811; Referee: Madden

2 January 2011 Scottish Second Division	Ayr United	2–0	Dumbarton	Somerset Park
	Roberts 11' (Penalty); McKay 78'	BBC Report		Attendance: 1,224; Referee: Charleston

15 January 2011 Scottish Second Division	Dumbarton	0–1	Stenhousemuir	Strathclyde Homes Stadium
		BBC Report	Dalziel 93'	Attendance: 490; Referee: Beaton

18 January 2011 Scottish Second Division	Dumbarton	4–1	Alloa Athletic	Strathclyde Homes Stadium
	McNiff 14'; Walker 41'; Carcary 53'; Geggan 80'	BBC Report	Gibson 56'	Attendance: 350; Referee: Norris

25 January 2011 Scottish Second Division	Dumbarton	1–2	Forfar Athletic	Strathclyde Homes Stadium
	Walker 26'	BBC Report	Fotheringham 71'; Deasley 72'	Attendance: 404; Referee: Colvin

29 January 2011 Scottish Second Division	Dumbarton	1–2	Brechin City	Strathclyde Homes Stadium
	McNiff (yellow card) 59' (red card); Gilhaney 86'	BBC Report	Hill 22'; Molloy 72'	Attendance: 565; Referee: Hilland

1 February 2011 Scottish Second Division	Airdrie United	1–2	Dumbarton	Excelsior Stadium
	McCord 84' (Penalty)	SFL Report	Gilhaney 21'; Walker 48'	Attendance: 591; Referee: Crawford

5 February 2011 Scottish Second Division	Alloa Athletic	2–3	Dumbarton	Recreation Park
	Motion 64'; Prunty 70'	BBC Report	Walker 35'; McShane 57'; McStay 74'	Attendance: 483; Referee: Smith

12 February 2011 Scottish Second Division	Dumbarton	1–1	Airdrie United	Strathclyde Homes Stadium
	McShane 4'	SFL Report	Morton 91'	Attendance: 723; Referee: Charleston

15 February 2011 Scottish Second Division	East Fife	1–3	Dumbarton	Bayview Stadium
	Park 44'	BBC Report	Walker 17'; Gilhaney 23'; Geggan 55'	Attendance: 392; Referee: Nicholls

19 February 2011 Scottish Second Division	Peterhead	1–2	Dumbarton	Balmoor
15:00	Smith 49'	SFL Report	McStay 25'; McShane 78'	Attendance: 388; Referee: Roache

22 February 2011 Scottish Second Division	Dumbarton	3–0	Peterhead	Strathclyde Homes Stadium
	Gilhaney 32', 54'; McShane 60'	SFL Report	Donald (red card) 39'	Attendance: 376; Referee: Somers

26 February 2011 Scottish Second Division	Forfar Athletic	2–1	Dumbarton	Station Park
	Brady 5'; R Campbell 78'	BBC Report	McShane 36'	Attendance: 487; Referee: Salmond

1 March 2011 Scottish Second Division	Brechin City	3–3	Dumbarton	Glebe Park
	Byers 9', 64'; McAllister 69'	BBC Report	McShane 11', 85'; Walker 65'	Attendance: 411; Referee: Robertson

5 March 2011 Scottish Second Division	Dumbarton	0–3	Livingston	Strathclyde Homes Stadium
15:00		BBC Report	Jacobs 5'; Russell 7'; Fox 70'	Attendance: 853; Referee: Roache

19 March 2011 Scottish Second Division	Dumbarton	4–2	East Fife	Strathclyde Homes Stadium
	Geggan 39'; McShane 51', 77'; Gilhaney 68'	BBC Report	Linn 27'; Johnstone 61'	Attendance: 615; Referee: O'Reilly

26 March 2011 Scottish Second Division	Brechin City	6–0	Dumbarton	Glebe Park
	McKenna 7', 79', 85'; Redman 46'; McAllister 52'; Megginson 83'	BBC Report		Attendance: 514; Referee: Somers

29 March 2011 Scottish Second Division	Stenhousemuir	2–2	Dumbarton	Ochilview Park
	Thomson (yellow card) 69' (red card); Paton 80' (Penalty); Hunter 83'	BBC Report	McShane 50', 68'	Attendance: 398; Referee: Beaton

2 April 2011 Scottish Second Division	Dumbarton	2–2	Alloa Athletic	Strathclyde Homes Stadium
	McLeish 36'; Geggan 49'	BBC Report	McGowan 48', 78'	Attendance: 640; Referee: Hilland

9 April 2011 Scottish Second Division	Dumbarton	5–2	Peterhead	Strathclyde Homes Stadium
	McShane 28'; Walker 40'; Halsman 64'; Gilhaney 73' (Penalty); McLeish 82'	SFL Report	Wyness 60'; Ross 81'	Attendance: 526; Referee: Charleston

16 April 2011 Scottish Second Division	Airdrie United	2–1	Dumbarton	Excelsior Stadium
	Sally 76'; Morton 81'	SFL Report	Halsman 16'	Attendance: 773; Referee: Conroy

23 April 2011 Scottish Second Division	Dumbarton	1–2	Ayr United	Strathclyde Homes Stadium
	Malone 63' (Own goal)	BBC Report	Trouten 10'; Moffat 16'	Attendance: 830; Referee: Smith

30 April 2011 Scottish Second Division	Livingston	1–1	Dumbarton	Braidwood Motor Company Stadium
15:00	Winters 80'	BBC Report	Walker 42'	Attendance: 1,549; Referee: O'Reilly

7 May 2011 Scottish Second Division	Dumbarton	0–0	Forfar Athletic	Strathclyde Homes Stadium
		BBC Report		Attendance: 787; Referee: Roache

=== Scottish Challenge Cup ===
25 July 2010 Scottish Challenge Cup round 1	Dumbarton	0–0 (a.e.t.) (3–4 p)	Greenock Morton	Strathclyde Homes Stadium
		SFL Report		Attendance: 1,301; Referee: Finnie

=== Scottish League Cup ===
31 July 2010 Scottish League Cup round 1	Queen of the South	5–1	Dumbarton	Palmerston Park
	Holmes 18', 28' (Penalty); Johnston 56'; Quinn 78'; Reilly 89'	BBC Report	Carcary 58'	Attendance: 1,329; Referee: Winter

=== Scottish Cup ===
20 November 2010 Scottish Cup round 3	Dumbarton	1–2	Greenock Morton	Strathclyde Homes Stadium
	Geggan 11'	BBC Report	Graham 42', 49'; MacGregor (yellow card) 79' (red card)	Attendance: 905; Referee: Charleston

=== Stirlingshire Cup ===
24 August 2010 First	Dumbarton	2–1	Stenhousemuir	Strathclyde Homes Stadium
	Metcalfe; Wallace		Goal

6 October 2010 Semi Final	Dumbarton	1–0	East Stirling	Strathclyde Homes Stadium
	Metcalfe

16 November 2010 Final	Dumbarton	2–0	Falkirk	Strathclyde Homes Stadium
	Wallace; Smith			Referee: C Charleston

=== Pre-season Matches ===
10 July 2010	Annan Athletic	0–0	Dumbarton	Galabank

13 July 2010	Dumbarton	2–1	Partick Thistle	Strathclyde Homes Stadium
	Geggan 10'; Campbell 87'		Donnelly	Attendance: 601; Referee: K Clancy

15 July 2010	Queen's Park	2–5	Dumbarton	Hampden Park
	Goal		McNiff 10'; Geggan; Chaplain; Cook

17 July 2010	Dumbarton	0–2	Oxford United	Strathclyde Homes Stadium
			Potter 19'; Deering 67'	Attendance: 461; Referee: S Conroy

19 July 2010	Dumbarton	2–2	St Mirren	Strathclyde Homes Stadium
	Carcary; Carcary		Goal	Attendance: 953

21 July 2010	Cumnock	1–3	Dumbarton	Townhead Park, Cumnock
	70'		Cook 12'; Chaplain 53'; Chisholm 77'

27 July 2010	Dumbarton	1–1	Clydebank	Strathclyde Homes Stadium
	McNiff		Goal

== League table ==
Pos	Team	Pld	W	D	L	GF	GA	GD	Pts	Promotion, qualification or relegation
5	East Fife	36	14	10	12	77	60	+17	52	
6	Airdrie United	36	13	9	14	52	60	−8	48	
7	Dumbarton	36	11	7	18	52	70	−18	40	
8	Stenhousemuir	36	10	8	18	46	59	−13	38	
9	Alloa Athletic (R)	36	9	9	18	49	71	−22	36	Qualification for the Second Division play-offs

Source: SPFL
Rules for classification: 1) points; 2) goal difference; 3) number of goals scored.
(R) Relegated

== Player statistics ==
=== Squad ===
No.	Pos	Nat	Player	Total		Second Division		Challenge Cup		League Cup		Scottish Cup	
No.	Pos	Nat	Player	Apps	Goals	Apps	Goals	Apps	Goals	Apps	Goals	Apps	Goals
	GK	(Scotland) SCO	Stephen Grindlay	33	0	30+0	0	1+0	0	1+0	0	1+0	0
	GK	(Scotland) SCO	Michael White	6	0	6+0	0	0+0	0	0+0	0	0+0	0
	DF	(Scotland) SCO	Iain Chisholm	17	0	11+5	0	0+0	0	0+0	0	0+1	0
	DF	(Scotland) SCO	James Creaney	26	0	25+0	0	0+0	0	0+0	0	1+0	0
	DF	(Scotland) SCO	Nicky Devlin	24	0	23+0	0	0+0	0	0+0	0	1+0	0
	DF	(Scotland) SCO	Ben Gordon	34	0	32+0	0	1+0	0	1+0	0	0+0	0
	DF	(Scotland) SCO	Jordan Halsman	14	2	13+1	2	0+0	0	0+0	0	0+0	0
	DF	(Scotland) SCO	Jonathan Lindsay	2	0	2+0	0	0+0	0	0+0	0	0+0	0
	DF	(Scotland) SCO	Martin McGowan	1	0	1+0	0	0+0	0	0+0	0	0+0	0
	DF	(Scotland) SCO	Allan McManus	10	0	8+0	0	1+0	0	1+0	0	0+0	0
	DF	(Scotland) SCO	Paul Nugent	34	0	32+0	0	1+0	0	0+0	0	1+0	0
	DF	(Scotland) SCO	Stirling Smith	6	0	6+0	0	0+0	0	0+0	0	0+0	0
	DF	(Scotland) SCO	Tony Wallace	5	0	3+1	0	0+0	0	1+0	0	0+0	0
	MF	(Scotland) SCO	Derek Carcary	24	4	8+14	3	1+0	0	1+0	1	0+0	0
	MF	(Scotland) SCO	Scott Chaplain	11	2	5+4	2	1+0	0	1+0	0	0+0	0
	MF	(Scotland) SCO	Alan Cook	11	1	4+5	1	0+1	0	0+0	0	1+0	0
	MF	(Scotland) SCO	Andy Geggan	37	5	33+1	4	1+0	0	1+0	0	1+0	1
	MF	(Scotland) SCO	Mark Gilhaney	29	9	24+5	9	0+0	0	0+0	0	0+0	0
	MF	(Scotland) SCO	Craig McLeish	11	2	7+3	2	0+0	0	0+0	0	1+0	0
	MF	(Scotland) SCO	Martin McNiff	30	1	24+3	1	1+0	0	1+0	0	1+0	0
	MF	(Scotland) SCO	Ryan McStay	33	2	25+5	2	1+0	0	1+0	0	0+1	0
	MF	(Scotland) SCO	Graham Wilson	5	0	3+1	0	1+0	0	0+0	0	0+0	0
	FW	(Scotland) SCO	Kieran Brannan	16	0	5+8	0	0+1	0	0+1	0	1+0	0
	FW	(Scotland) SCO	Ross Campbell	20	1	8+9	1	1+0	0	1+0	0	1+0	0
	FW	(Scotland) SCO	Roddy Hunter	1	0	1+0	0	0+0	0	0+0	0	0+0	0
	FW	(Scotland) SCO	Paul Maxwell	9	1	5+2	1	0+1	0	1+0	0	0+0	0
	FW	(Scotland) SCO	Ryan Metcalfe	4	0	1+3	0	0+0	0	0+0	0	0+0	0
	FW	(Scotland) SCO	Jon McShane	31	13	25+4	13	0+0	0	0+1	0	1+0	0
	FW	(Scotland) SCO	Gary Smith	5	0	1+3	0	0+0	0	0+0	0	0+1	0
	FW	(Scotland) SCO	Patrick Walker	24	9	24+0	9	0+0	0	0+0	0	0+0	0
	FW	(Scotland) SCO	Jordan White	8	0	1+7	0	0+0	0	0+0	0	0+0	0

=== Transfers ===
==== Players in ====
Player	From	Date
(Scotland) Paul Nugent	(Scotland) East Fife	4 Jun 2010
(Scotland) Stephen Grindlay	(Scotland) Ayr United	10 Jun 2010
(Scotland) Allan McManus	(Scotland) Morton	10 Jun 2010
(Scotland) Ross Campbell	(Scotland) Dunfermline Athletic	5 Jul 2010
(Scotland) Paul Maxwell	(Scotland) Ashfield	5 Jul 2010
(Scotland) Graham Wilson	(Scotland) Cumnock	5 Jul 2010
(Scotland) Tony Wallace	(Scotland) Dumbarton Youth	20 Jul 2010
(Scotland) Jon McShane	(Scotland) St Mirren (loan)	30 Jul 2010
(Scotland) James Creaney	(Republic of Ireland) Galway United	21 Aug 2010
(Scotland) Nicky Devlin	(Scotland) Dumbarton Youth	23 Aug 2010
(Scotland) Ryan Metcalfe	(Scotland) Dumbarton Youth	23 Aug 2010
(Scotland) Mark Gilhaney	(Scotland) Alloa Athletic	27 Aug 2010
(Scotland) Gary Smith	(Scotland) Motherwell (loan)	27 Aug 2010
(Scotland) Stirling Smith	(Scotland) Aberdeen (loan)	31 Aug 2010
(Scotland) Martin McGowan	(Scotland) Knightswood Juv (trialist)	23 Oct 2010
(Scotland) Jonathan Lindsay	(Scotland) St Johnstone (loan)	22 Nov 2010
(Scotland) Patrick Walker	(Scotland) Annan Athletic	16 Jan 2011
(Scotland) Craig McLeish	(Scotland) Falkirk (loan)	27 Jan 2011
(Scotland) Jordan Halsman	(Scotland) Motherwell (loan)	28 Jan 2011
(Scotland) Jordan White	(Scotland) Dunfermline Athletic (loan)	3 Mar 2011

==== Players out ====
Player	To	Date
(Scotland) Mick Dunlop	(Scotland) Alloa Athletic	20 May 2010
(Scotland) Stevie Murray	(Scotland) Stenhousemuir	2 Jun 2010
(Scotland) Ross Clark	(Scotland) Stenhousemuir	18 Jun 2010
(Scotland) Dennis Wyness	(Scotland) Peterhead	8 Jul 2010
(Scotland) Ross O'Donoghue	(Scotland) Elgin City	22 Jul 2010
(Scotland) Chris Smith	(Scotland) Ayr United	23 Jul 2010
(Scotland) Roddy Hunter	(Scotland) Pollok	
(Czech Republic) Jan Vojacek	(Czech Republic) SK Sigma Olomouc	
(Scotland) David Winters	(Vietnam) Can Tho	

== Trivia ==
- The League match against Arbroath on 26 February marked Stephen Grindlay's 200th appearance for Dumbarton in all national competitions - the 30th Dumbarton player to break the 'double century'.
- The League match against East Fife on 30 October marked Ben Gordon's 100th appearance for Dumbarton in all national competitions - the 131st Dumbarton player to reach this milestone.

== See also ==
- List of Dumbarton F.C. seasons
