= Jackson Longridge =

Scottish footballer

Personal information
- Full name: Jackson Longridge
- Date of birth: 12 April 1995 (age 31)
- Place of birth: Glasgow, Scotland
- Position: Left-back

Team information
- Current team: Greenock Morton
- Number: 23

Senior career*
| Years | Team | Apps | (Gls) |
| 2012–2014 | Ayr United | 9 | (0) |
| 2014–2015 | Stranraer | 34 | (1) |
| 2015–2018 | Livingston | 91 | (8) |
| 2018–2019 | Dunfermline Athletic | 33 | (4 (Note: A number of sources incorrectly attribute a goal against Ross County during the 2018–19 season to Longridge; however, an own goal was scored by County defender Ross Draper.)) |
| 2019–2021 | Bradford City | 3 | (0) |
| 2020 | → Torquay United (loan) | 6 | (0) |
| 2021–2023 | Livingston | 35 | (0) |
| 2023 | → Cove Rangers (loan) | 9 | (1) |
| 2023–2025 | Hamilton Academical | 56 | (2) |
| 2025– | Greenock Morton | 31 | (2) |
- * Club domestic league appearances and goals as of 4 May 2026

Jackson Longridge (born 12 April 1995) is a Scottish professional footballer who plays as a left-back for Scottish Championship club Greenock Morton.

Longridge previously played for Bradford City, Torquay United, Ayr United, Stranraer, Livingston and Dunfermline Athletic.

== Career ==
Longridge made his debut for Ayr United in a First Division match against Dundee, that Ayr won 3–2, winning the 'Man of the Match' award. In the play-off semi-final match, against Airdrie United on 12 May 2012, he was sent off by referee Steven McLean for an over the ball challenge on Ricki Lamie.

On 18 June 2014, he signed for Stranraer. Longridge scored his first senior goal in a 4–2 victory over Forfar Athletic on 10 January 2015. Longridge signed for Livingston in June 2015. He helped them win successive promotions in 2016–17 and 2017–18.

In June 2018, Longridge signed for Dunfermline Athletic on a two-year contract. He signed for the club at the same time as his brother Louis. After one season with Dunfermline, he signed a two-year contract with EFL League Two club Bradford City for an undisclosed fee. He moved on loan to Torquay United in January 2020.

On 19 January 2021, Longridge left Bradford City by mutual consent, and returned to Livingston. Longridge was loaned to Cove Rangers in March 2023.

Longridge signed for Hamilton Academical on 19 June 2023.

== Career statistics ==
As of 5 April 2025

Appearances and goals by club, season and competition
| Club | Season | League | | | National cup (Note: Includes Scottish Cup) | | League cup (Note: Includes Scottish League Cup, EFL Cup) | | Other | | Total | |
| Club | Season | Division | Apps | Goals | Apps | Goals | Apps | Goals | Apps | Goals | Apps | Goals |
|---|---|---|---|---|---|---|---|---|---|---|---|---|
| Ayr United | 2011–12 | Scottish First Division | 2 | 0 | 0 | 0 | 0 | 0 | 2 (Note: Appearances in the First Division play-offs) | 0 | 4 | 0 |
| Ayr United | 2012–13 | Scottish Second Division | 3 | 0 | 0 | 0 | 0 | 0 | 0 | 0 | 3 | 0 |
| Ayr United | 2013–14 | Scottish League One | 4 | 0 | 0 | 0 | 0 | 0 | 0 | 0 | 4 | 0 |
| Ayr United | Total | | 9 | 0 | 0 | 0 | 0 | 0 | 2 | 0 | 11 | 0 |
| Stranraer | 2014–15 | Scottish League One | 34 | 1 | 4 | 0 | 2 | 0 | 6 (Note: Four appearances in the Scottish Challenge Cup and two in the Championship play-offs) | 0 | 46 | 1 |
| Livingston | 2015–16 | Scottish Championship | 30 | 1 | 2 | 0 | 3 | 0 | 4 (Note: Three appearances in the Scottish Challenge Cup and two in the Championship play-offs) | 0 | 39 | 1 |
| Livingston | 2016–17 | Scottish League One | 30 | 3 | 1 | 0 | 4 | 0 | 3 (Note: Appearances in the Scottish Challenge Cup) | 1 | 38 | 4 |
| Livingston | 2017–18 | Scottish Championship | 31 | 3 | 2 | 0 | 6 | 0 | 6 (Note: Two appearances in the Scottish Challenge Cup and four in the Premiership play-offs) | 0 | 45 | 3 |
| Livingston | Total | | 91 | 7 | 5 | 0 | 13 | 0 | 13 | 1 | 122 | 8 |
| Dunfermline Athletic | 2018–19 | Scottish Championship | 33 | 4 | 1 | 0 | 5 | 1 | 2 | 0 | 41 | 5 |
| Bradford City | 2019–20 | EFL League Two | 1 | 0 | 0 | 0 | 1 | 0 | 3 (Note: Appearances in the Football League Trophy) | 0 | 5 | 0 |
| Bradford City | 2020–21 | EFL League Two | 2 | 0 | 0 | 0 | 0 | 0 | 3 | 0 | 5 | 0 |
| Bradford City | Total | | 3 | 0 | 0 | 0 | 1 | 0 | 6 | 0 | 7 | 0 |
| Torquay United (loan) | 2019–20 | National League | 6 | 0 | 0 | 0 | 0 | 0 | 1 (Note: Appearances in the FA Trophy) | 0 | 7 | 0 |
| Livingston | 2020–21 | Scottish Premiership | 9 | 0 | 2 | 0 | 1 | 0 | 0 | 0 | 12 | 0 |
| Livingston | 2021–22 | Scottish Premiership | 16 | 0 | 1 | 0 | 5 | 1 | 0 | 0 | 22 | 1 |
| Livingston | 2022–23 | Scottish Premiership | 10 | 0 | 1 | 0 | 1 | 0 | 0 | 0 | 12 | 0 |
| Livingston | Total | | 35 | 0 | 4 | 0 | 7 | 1 | 0 | 0 | 46 | 1 |
| Cove Rangers (loan) | 2022–23 | Scottish Championship | 9 | 1 | 0 | 0 | 0 | 0 | 0 | 0 | 9 | 1 |
| Hamilton Academical | 2023–24 | Scottish League One | 33 | 2 | 1 | 0 | 4 | 0 | 6 | 0 | 44 | 2 |
| Hamilton Academical | 2024–25 | Scottish Championship | 21 | 0 | 2 | 0 | 0 | 0 | 2 | 0 | 25 | 0 |
| Hamilton Academical | Total | | 54 | 2 | 3 | 0 | 4 | 0 | 8 | 0 | 69 | 2 |
| Career total | | | 274 | 15 | 17 | 0 | 32 | 2 | 38 | 1 | 361 | 18 |

== Honours ==
Livingston

- Scottish League One: 2016–17
