= Liam Tomsett =

English footballer (born 1992)

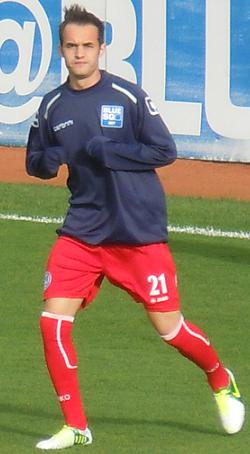
- Tomsett with Hyde in 2012

Personal information
- Full name: Liam Richard Tomsett
- Date of birth: 27 October 1992 (age 34)
- Place of birth: Ulverston, England
- Height: 5 ft 11 in (1.80 m)
- Position: Midfielder

Team information
- Current team: Ashton United

Youth career
- 2003–2010: Blackpool

Senior career*
Years	Team	Apps	(Gls)
2010–2014	Blackpool	0	(0)
2011–2012	→ Altrincham (loan)	5	(0)
2012	→ Ayr United (loan)	19	(1)
2012–2013	→ Hyde (loan)	38	(0)
2013–2014	→ Hyde (loan)	45	(4)
2014–2015	AFC Fylde	33	(3)
2015–2017	Curzon Ashton	54	(2)
2023–	Ashton United		
- * Club domestic league appearances and goals

Liam Richard Tomsett (born 27 October 1992) is an English footballer who plays as a midfielder. He began his career with Blackpool F.C.

== Career ==
=== Blackpool ===
Born in Ulverston, Cumbria, Tomsett was with Blackpool's junior teams for six years, before signing as a first year scholar with youth department in May 2009. On 8 January 2011, he made his first-team debut in the third round of the 2010–11 FA Cup, against Southampton. He won the club's Young Player of the year award at the end of the season. Then on 8 July he signed a professional contract with the Seasiders, 12 months with the option for a further year.

On 22 December 2011, he joined Conference North side Altrincham on a one-month loan deal. He made his debut on 26 December 2012 in his side's 5–1 win over Droylsden. He made five appearances for the club before returning to Blackpool. On his return in January 2012 he was sent on loan again to Scottish First Division side Ayr United until the end of the season. joining fellow Blackpool loanee Adam Dodd at Somerset Park. He made his debut the following day as a 71st-minute substitute in a 2–2 draw with Hamilton Academical. His full debut came on 11 February in a 1–1 draw at home to Queen of the South. Just a week after his full debut, he scored his first professional goal, a late equaliser in a 1–1 draw against league leaders Ross County at Victoria Park. He made a total of 19 appearances, scoring one goal before returning to Blackpool at the end of the season. He was also named young player of the year by the fans at Ayr united.

==== Hyde loans ====
Tomsett joined Conference Premier side Hyde on an initial one-month loan deal on 24 August 2012, with the option of an extension. He made his debut the following day as a 57th-minute substitute in a 1–0 defeat to Mansfield Town at Field Mill. He received the first red card of his career in September 2012 as his side lost 2–0 at Wrexham. He spent the whole of the 2012–13 season with Hyde playing a total of 41 games in all competitions, failing to score.

On 1 August 2013, he re-joined Hyde on a season-long loan deal, just weeks after agreeing a new one-year contract at his parent club Blackpool.

==== AFC Fylde ====
On 4 July 2014, it was announced that Liam had turned down several offers to join Conference North newcomers AFC Fylde following his release from Blackpool.

==== Curzon Ashton ====
He then joined Curzon Ashton.

== Career statistics ==
As of 1 August 2013

Club performance			League		Cup		League Cup		Total	
Season	Club	League	Apps	Goals	Apps	Goals	Apps	Goals	Apps	Goals
England			League		FA Cup		League Cup		Total	
2010–11	Blackpool	Premier League	0	0	1	0	0	0	1	0
2011–12	Altrincham	Conference North	5	0	0	0	—	—	5	0
Scotland			League		Scottish Cup		League Cup		Total	
2011–12	Ayr United	First Division	16	1	2	0	1	0	19	1
England			League		FA Cup		League Cup		Total	
2012–13	Hyde (loan)	Conference Premier	38	0	3	0	—	—	41	0
2013–14	Hyde (loan)	Conference Premier	45	4	0	0	—	—	0	0
Total	England		88	0	4	0	0	0	47	0
Total	Scotland		16	1	2	0	1	0	19	1
Career total			59	1	6	0	1	0	66	1
