= Adam Dodd =

English footballer

Personal information
- Full name: Adam John Dodd
- Date of birth: 14 May 1993 (age 33)
- Place of birth: Kirkham, England
- Positions: Midfielder; left back

Team information
- Current team: Bamber Bridge

Youth career
- 2002–2011: Blackpool

Senior career*
Years	Team	Apps	(Gls)
2011–2014	Blackpool	0	(0)
2011–2012	→ Altrincham (loan)	5	(0)
2012	→ Ayr United (loan)	16	(2)
2014–2015	Chorley	17	(0)
2015–2019	Bamber Bridge		
2019–2023	FC United of Manchester	88	(5)
2023–	Bamber Bridge		
- * Club domestic league appearances and goals as of 05:34, 19 September 2026 (UTC)

Adam John Dodd (born 14 May 1993) is an English professional footballer who plays as a left back for Northern Premier League Premier Division club Bamber Bridge.

== Career ==
Dodd was born in Kirkham, Lancashire, and joined Blackpool at under-10 level. He progressed through the youth teams & sign a two-year scholarship in 2009 along with seven other youngsters. During the 2010–11 season he appeared on the bench in Blackpool's FA Cup tie against Southampton but remained an unused substitute. He signed a full-time professional contract in May 2011 following the completion of his scholarship. A feat he admits would have been difficult without the guidance of Head of Youth Gary Parkinson.

Blackpool allowed Dodd to join Conference North side Altrincham on a month's loan deal. On 3 December 2011, he made his Conference debut at Halifax Town and started his first game, at left-back, on Boxing Day at home to Droylsden. He departed Altrincham on 7 January 2012 having made five league appearances – three of which were starts.

Upon his return to Blackpool he was again loaned out, this time to Scottish club Ayr United. He made his debut for the club in goalless draw against Falkirk in a First Division fixture. Dodd entered the match as 60th-minute substitute, replacing Tam McManus. Before the following match against Hamilton Academical he was joined at club by Blackpool teammate Liam Tomsett who had also agreed a five-month loan. On 21 January 2012, Dodd made his home debut for Ayr at Somerset Park, starting, in a 2–2 draw. He marked the occasion with his first senior competitive goal scoring a free kick from 30-yards, striking the ball with his left foot and curling it into the top right hand corner of the net.

In November 2015 he joined Bamber Bridge.

In May 2019 he joined FC United of Manchester.

In June 2023, Dodd returned to Bamber Bridge.

== Personal life ==
On the night of 3 June 2022, Dodd suffered a cardiac arrest in his sleep and was resuscitated the following morning by his girlfriend Kat. Dodd was fitted with a defibrillator in Blackpool Victoria Hospital prior to being discharged, but was readmitted a few days later due to complications. His first game after the cardiac arrest was FC United of Manchester's 3–2 defeat to BK Skjold at the FENIX Trophy semi-finals on 7 June 2023. In July 2024, Dodd and his girlfriend married in a ceremony attended by family and friends.

== Career statistics ==
Table correct as of 19 September 2026.

Appearances and goals by club, season and competition
Club	Season	League			Cup		League Cup		Other		Total	
Club	Season	Division	Apps	Goals	Apps	Goals	Apps	Goals	Apps	Goals	Apps	Goals
Blackpool	2010–11	Premier League	0	0	0	0	0	0	0	0	0	0
Blackpool	2011–12	Championship	0	0	0	0	0	0	0	0	0	0
Blackpool	2012–13	Championship	0	0	0	0	0	0	0	0	0	0
Blackpool	2013–14	Championship	0	0	0	0	0	0	0	0	0	0
Blackpool	Total		0	0	0	0	0	0	0	0	0	0
Altrincham (loan)	2011–12	Conference North	5	0	0	0	0	0	0	0	5	0
Ayr United (loan)	2011–12	Scottish First Division	16	2	2	0	1	0	0	0	19	2
Chorley	2014–15	Conference North	7	0	0	0	0	0	0	0	7	0
Chorley	2015–16	National League North	8	0	1	0	0	0	0	0	9	0
Chorley	Total		15	0	1	0	0	0	0	0	16	0
FC United of Manchester	2019–20	NPL Premier Division	29	3	3	0	2 (Note: Two appearances and one goal in Northern Premier League League Challenge Cup)	1	7 (Note: Five appearances and one goal in FA Trophy, and two appearances and one goal in Manchester Premier Cup)	2	41	6
FC United of Manchester	2020–21	NPL Premier Division	7	0	4	0	0	0	1 (Note: One appearance in FA Trophy)	0	12	0
FC United of Manchester	2021–22	NPL Premier Division	37	2	4	0	0	0	5 (Note: One appearance in FA Trophy, and four appearances and one goal in Fenix Trophy)	1	46	3
FC United of Manchester	2022–23	NPL Premier Division	15	0	0	0	0	0	4 (Note: Four appearances in Fenix Trophy)	0	19	0
FC United of Manchester	Total		88	5	11	0	2	1	17	3	118	9
Career total			124	7	14	0	3	1	17	3	158	11
