= Roddy Paterson =

Scottish footballer

Personal information
- Full name: Roddy Paterson
- Date of birth: 13 June 1993 (age 33)
- Place of birth: Irvine, Scotland
- Position: Forward

Team information
- Current team: Irvine Meadow

Senior career*
Years	Team	Apps	(Gls)
2009–2013	Ayr United	9	(1)
2013	Troon	21	(11)
2013–2014	Lugar Boswell Thistle F.C.	29	(16)
2015-2016	Maybole	13	(5)
2018-2019	Irvine Meadow XI	31	(18)
2019-	Petershill	42	(29)
- * Club domestic league appearances and goals as of 9 August 2012

Roddy Paterson (born 23 June 1993) is a Scottish professional footballer who plays for Petershill F.C. as a forward

== Career ==
=== Ayr United ===
Paterson signed for Ayr United on the 21 October 2009. On 24 July 2010, he made his first team debut as a substitute in the Challenge Cup with his Scottish Second Division debut coming on 7 August 2010 against Brechin City at Somerset Park. In all he made four appearances in his debut season.

A regular scorer for Ayr's reserves he scored his first professional goal in his first start on 9 August 2011, a 3–0 win over Raith Rovers in the Challenge Cup. Following Ayr's promotion he made his Scottish First Division debut as a substitute against Queen of the South on 24 September in a 1–0 win.

In January 2013, Paterson signed with Troon F.C., who he helped to promotion after finishing 2nd in the Ayrshire league in the 2012/13 season. He is now with Lugar Boswell in the Ayrshire league.

On 6 December 2018, Paterson signed with Irvine Meadow.

He is now with Petershill FC

== Career statistics ==
As of 8 August 2012

Club statistics
Club	Season	League	League		Scottish Cup		League Cup		Other		Total	
Club	Season	League	App	Goals	App	Goals	App	Goals	App	Goals	App	Goals
Ayr United	2010-11 season	SFL2	3	0	0	0	0	0	1	0	4	0
Ayr United	2011-12 season	SFL1	2	0	0	0	1	0	2	1	5	1
Ayr United	2012-13 season	SFL2	0	0	0	0	0	0	0	0	0	0
Total			5	0	0	0	1	0	3	1	9	1
