= Steven Hutchinson =

German basketball player and coach

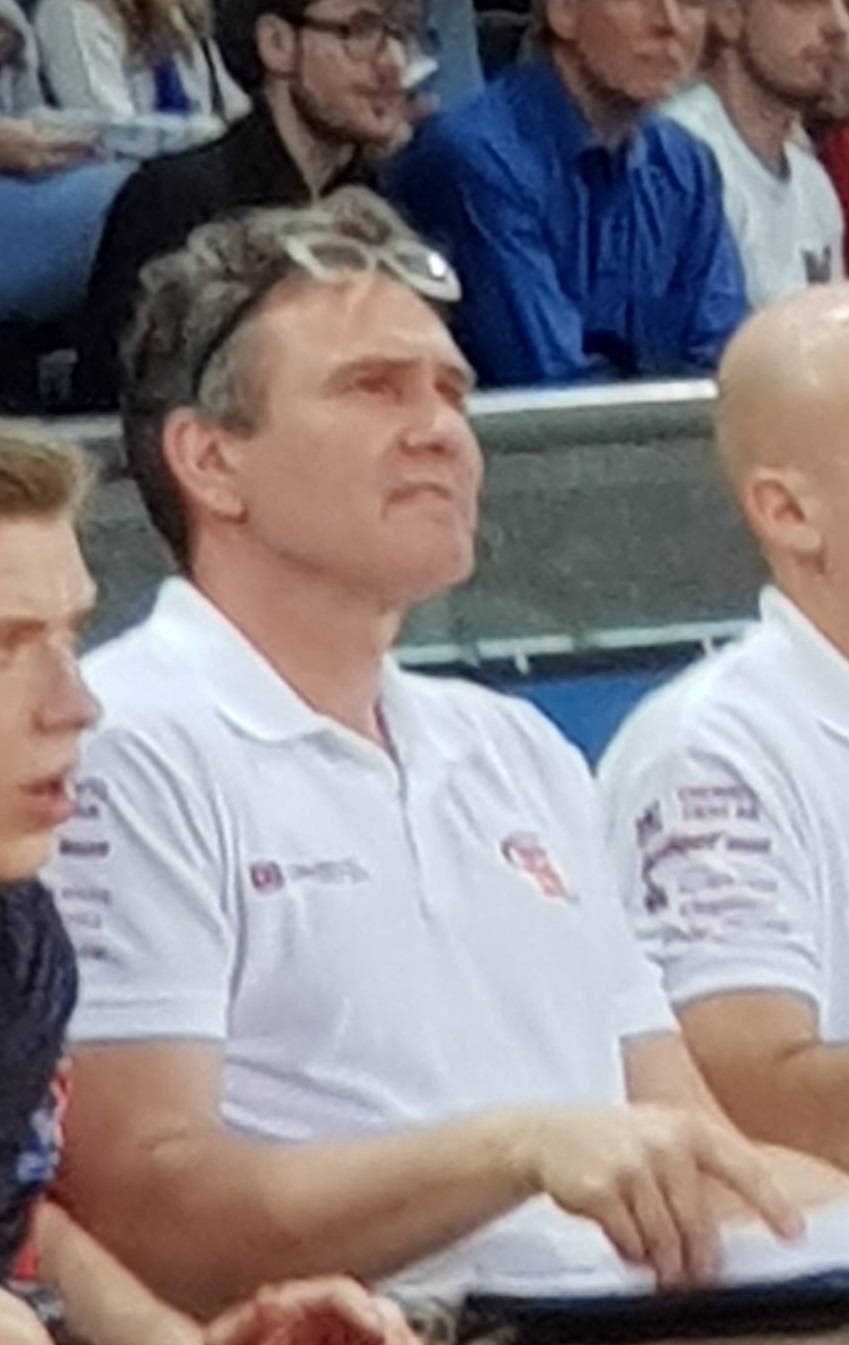
- Hutchinson with BV Chemnitz 99 in 2020

Personal information
- Born: 17 January 1968 (age 58) Berlin, Germany
- Listed height: 6 ft 7 in (2.01 m)
- Listed weight: 209 lb (95 kg)

Career information
- College: Portland (1989–1990)
- Playing career: 1991–2004
- Position: Assistant Coach

Career history

Playing
- 1990–1992: DJK Würzburg
- 1997–1999: Telekom Baskets Bonn
- 1999–2002: TSV Bayer 04 Leverkusen
- 2002–2004: EWE Baskets Oldenburg

Coaching
- 2018–2020: BV Chemnitz 99 (assistant)

Steven Hutchinson (born 17 January 1968) is a German basketball coach and former player. Since 2018, he has served as assistant coach for BV Chemnitz 99 of the German ProA league.

As an active player, he played several seasons for the Telekom Baskets Bonn of the German Basketball League.

His last team as an active player was EWE Baskets Oldenburg of the German Basketball Bundesliga.

Throughout his career, he had been selected to the BBL All-Star Game on two occasions.

== Personal ==
Born in Berlin as the child of an American father and a German mother, Hutchinson spent most of his childhood in Würzburg.
