= 2011–12 Scottish First Division =

Irn-Bru Scottish First Division
- Season: 2011–12
- Champions: Ross County
- Promoted: Ross County; Dundee
- Relegated: Ayr United; Queen of the South
- Matches: 180
- Goals: 507 (2.82 per match)
- Top goalscorer: Colin McMenamin (19)
- Biggest home win: Partick Thistle 5–0 Greenock Morton (30 September 2011); Raith Rovers 5–0 Greenock Morton (3 March 2012)
- Biggest away win: Hamilton Academical 1–6 Dundee (3 December 2011); Queen of the South 0–5 Partick Thistle (17 March 2012)
- Highest scoring: (8 goals); Queen of the South 3–5 Ross County (5 May 2012)
- Longest winning run: 9 games Ross County
- Longest unbeaten run: 34 games Ross County
- Longest winless run: 9 games Ayr United
- Longest losing run: 4 games Queen of the South; Raith Rovers; Falkirk; Ayr United
- Highest attendance: 5,862; Dundee v Greenock Morton (26 December 2011)
- Lowest attendance: 859; Livingston v Ayr United (6 March 2011)
- Average attendance: 2,297

The 2011–12 Scottish Football League First Division, also known as the 2011–12 Irn Bru Scottish Football League First Division for sponsorship reasons, is the 18th season of the Scottish First Division and the 106th season of a second-tier football league in Scotland. Dunfermline Athletic are the current champions. It began on 6 August 2011 and is scheduled to end on 5 May 2012. The league comprises the teams ranked second through eighth of the 2010–11 season, the relegated side from the 2010–11 Premier League (Hamilton Academical), the 2010–11 Second Division champions, and the winners of the 2010–11 First Division play-off (Livingston and Ayr United respectively).

== Teams ==
Location of teams in 2011–12 Scottish First Division

Dunfermline Athletic, champions of the 2010–11 season, were promoted to the 2011–12 Premier League. The club thus completed a five-season tenure in the First Division. Dunfermline were replaced by Hamilton Academical, who were relegated from the 2010–11 Premier League after finishing at the bottom of the table; Hamilton returned to the First Division after three years.

At the bottom end of the table, last-placed Stirling Albion were directly relegated to the 2011–12 Second Division after being promoted to the second tier only one season earlier. They were replaced by the 2010–11 Second Division champions Livingston, who returned to the First Division after two consecutive promotions in two years; the club had previously been demoted for financial irregularities at the end of the 2008–09 season.

An additional place in the league was available via a play-off tournament between the ninth-placed First Division team, Cowdenbeath, and the sides ranked second through to fourth in the Second Division, Ayr United, Forfar Athletic and Brechin City respectively. The tournament was won by Ayr United, who therefore were promoted back to the First Division after a one-year absence; Cowdenbeath hence were relegated, returning to the Second Division after just one season.

=== Stadia and locations ===
Team	Location	Stadium	Capacity
Ayr United	Ayr	Somerset Park	10,243
Dundee	Dundee	Dens Park	12,085
Falkirk	Falkirk	Falkirk Stadium	9,120
Greenock Morton	Greenock	Cappielow	11,612
Hamilton Academical	Hamilton	New Douglas Park	6,096
Livingston	Livingston	Braidwood Motor Company Stadium	10,122
Partick Thistle	Glasgow	Firhill Stadium	13,079
Queen of the South	Dumfries	Palmerston Park	6,412
Raith Rovers	Kirkcaldy	Stark's Park	10,104
Ross County	Dingwall	Victoria Park	6,310

=== Personnel and kits ===
Team	Manager	Kit manufacturer	Shirt sponsor
Ayr United	(Scotland) Brian Reid	Nike	Bodog
Dundee	(Scotland) Barry Smith	Puma	Kilmac Energy
Falkirk	(Scotland) Steven Pressley	Puma	Central Demolition
Greenock Morton	(Scotland) Allan Moore	Puma	Ferguson's Chocolates (H), Buchanan's Toffees (A), Millions Chews (T)
Hamilton Academical	(Scotland) Billy Reid	Nike	M&H Logistics (H), Life Skills Centres (A, T)
Livingston	(Scotland) John Hughes	Umbro	Fasteq
Partick Thistle	(Scotland) Jackie McNamara	Puma	macb (Until March) Just Employment Law (March onwards)
Queen of the South	(Scotland) Gus MacPherson	Joma	Border Utilities Ltd
Raith Rovers	(Scotland) John McGlynn	Puma	Kittys & Styx (H), ACA Sports (A)
Ross County	(Scotland) Derek Adams	Nike	Highnet

== League table ==
Pos	Team	Pld	W	D	L	GF	GA	GD	Pts	Promotion, qualification or relegation
1	Ross County (C, P)	36	22	13	1	72	32	+40	79	Promotion to the Premier League
2	Dundee (P)	36	15	10	11	53	43	+10	55 (Note: Dundee were chosen to take the place of Rangers.)	Promotion to the Premier League
3	Falkirk	36	13	13	10	53	48	+5	52	
4	Hamilton Academical	36	14	7	15	55	56	−1	49	
5	Livingston	36	13	9	14	56	54	+2	48	
6	Partick Thistle	36	12	11	13	50	39	+11	47	
7	Raith Rovers	36	11	11	14	46	49	−3	44	
8	Greenock Morton	36	10	12	14	40	55	−15	42	
9	Ayr United (R)	36	9	11	16	44	67	−23	38	Qualification for the First Division play-offs
10	Queen of the South (R)	36	7	11	18	38	64	−26	32	Relegation to the Second Division

Source: SPFL Archive
Rules for classification: 1) points; 2) goal difference; 3) number of goals scored.
(C) Champions; (P) Promoted; (R) Relegated

== Results ==
Teams play each other four times in this league. In the first half of the season each team plays every other team twice (home and away) and then do the same in the second half of the season, for a total of 36 games

=== First half of season ===
Home \ Away	AYR	DND	FAL	GMO	HAM	LIV	PAR	QOS	RAI	ROS
Ayr United		1–3	2–2	0–1	1–2	0–0	0–0	1–0	2–1	2–3
Dundee	1–1		4–2	0–1	0–1	3–0	0–1	2–1	1–0	1–2
Falkirk	0–0	2–1		1–0	0–0	4–3	2–1	1–0	2–0	1–1
Greenock Morton	4–1	1–2	3–2		0–2	2–1	1–2	2–2	1–1	0–2
Hamilton Academical	2–3	1–6	0–1	1–2		1–1	1–0	3–1	2–2	5–1
Livingston	1–2	4–2	1–1	1–1	1–0		2–1	2–2	1–1	0–3
Partick Thistle	4–0	0–1	2–2	5–0	1–1	2–1		2–1	0–1	0–1
Queen of the South	4–1	0–0	1–5	4–1	1–0	0–2	0–0		1–3	0–0
Raith Rovers	0–1	0–1	1–0	1–1	3–2	0–1	2–0	0–2		0–1
Ross County	4–0	1–1	3–1	0–0	1–0	1–1	2–2	2–0	4–2	

Updated to match(es) played on 7 March 2012. Source: BBC Sport
Legend: Blue = home team win; Yellow = draw; Red = away team win.

=== Second half of season ===
Home \ Away	AYR	DND	FAL	GMO	HAM	LIV	PAR	QOS	RAI	ROS
Ayr United		3–2	1–0	0–0	2–2	3–1	1–3	1–1	1–1	1–3
Dundee	4–1		3–1	0–1	2–2	1–0	0–3	1–1	1–1	1–1
Falkirk	3–2	1–1		0–2	3–0	2–5	1–1	3–0	2–3	1–1
Greenock Morton	3–1	0–2	0–0		1–2	1–3	1–0	2–2	1–3	1–1
Hamilton Academical	3–2	3–1	0–1	4–3		0–1	2–2	3–0	2–1	0–2
Livingston	0–1	2–3	1–2	0–0	0–4		3–1	2–2	4–0	1–3
Partick Thistle	4–2	0–0	1–1	0–0	2–0	2–3		1–0	1–1	0–1
Queen of the South	2–1	1–1	0–0	2–1	1–2	0–4	0–5		1–0	3–5
Raith Rovers	2–2	0–1	2–2	5–0	2–1	0–3	2–1	3–1		1–1
Ross County	1–1	3–0	2–1	2–2	5–1	3–0	3–0	2–1	1–1	

Updated to match(es) played on 5 May 2012. Source: BBC Sport
Legend: Blue = home team win; Yellow = draw; Red = away team win.

== First Division play-offs ==
Times are BST (UTC+1)

=== Semi-finals ===
The fourth placed team in the Second Division (Airdrie United) will play the ninth placed team in the First Division (Ayr United) and third placed team in the Second Division (Dumbarton) will play the second placed team in the Second Division (Arbroath). The play-offs will be played over two legs, the winning team in each semi-final will advance to the final.

Team 1	Agg.	Team 2	1st leg	2nd leg
Dumbarton	2–1	Arbroath	2–1	0–0
Airdrie United	3–1	Ayr United	0–0	3–1

First legs

9 May
7:30 pm

Dumbarton	2–1	Arbroath
Wallace 16'; Prunty 62'		Malcolm 5'

Dumbarton Football Stadium
Attendance: 911
Referee: Craig Charleston

9 May
7:45 pm

Airdrie United	0–0	Ayr United

Excelsior Stadium
Attendance: 1,871
Referee: Crawford Allan

Second legs

12 May
3:00 pm

Arbroath	0–0	Dumbarton

Gayfield Park

12 May
3:00 pm

Ayr United	1–3	Airdrie United
Geggan 64'; Longridge (red card) 17'; Tiffoney (red card) 90'		Holmes 55', 65'; McLaren 85'

Somerset Park

=== Final ===
The two semi-final winners will play each other over two legs. Originally, the winning team only was to be awarded a place in the 2012–13 First Division. Following the Rangers F.C. administration situation, both teams were awarded places.

Team 1	Agg.	Team 2	1st leg	2nd leg
Dumbarton	6–2	Airdrie United	2–1	4–1

First leg

16 May 2012
7:45 pm

Dumbarton	2–1	Airdrie United
Prunty 29'; Wallace 32'		Bain 42'

Dumbarton Football Stadium

Second leg

20 May 2012
4:05 pm

Airdrie United	1–4	Dumbarton
Holmes 35'; Bain (red card) 80'		Dargo 9', 21'; Gilhaney 45+3'; Wallace 65'

Excelsior Stadium

== Statistics ==
=== Top goalscorers ===
As of 21 April 2012

Rank	Scorer	Team	Goals
1	(Scotland) Colin McMenamin	Ross County	19
2	(Morocco) Farid El Alagui	Falkirk	18
3	(Scotland) Kris Doolan	Partick Thistle	13
3	(Scotland) Michael Gardyne	Ross County	13
4	(England) Rory Boulding	Livingston	11
4	(Scotland) Paul Cairney	Partick Thistle	11
4	(Scotland) Ryan Conroy	Dundee	11
4	(Scotland) Brian Graham	Raith Rovers	11
4	(Scotland) Marc McNulty	Livingston	11
4	(Scotland) Steven Milne	Dundee	11

=== Hat-tricks ===
Player	For	Against	Result	Date
(Scotland) Kevin Smith	Queen of the South	Greenock Morton	4–1	17 September 2011
(Scotland) Steven Milne	Dundee	Hamilton Academical	6–1	3 December 2011
(Scotland) Marc McNulty	Livingston	Raith Rovers	4–0	18 February 2012
(Scotland) Richard Brittain	Ross County	Ayr United	3–2	29 February 2012
(England) Rory Boulding	Livingston	Raith Rovers	3–0	10 April 2012
(Scotland) Brian Graham	Raith Rovers	Falkirk	3–2	21 April 2012
(Scotland) Paul Cairney	Partick Thistle	Dundee	3–0	21 April 2012

=== Disciplinary by player ===
As of 7 March 2011 23:25 (BST)

Rank	Player	Team	Yellow	Red
1	(Scotland) Mark McLaughlin	Hamilton Academical	5	2
1	(Germany) Simon Mensing	Hamilton Academical	8	1
3	(Scotland) Stephen O'Donnell	Dundee	4	2
3	(Scotland) Darren Dods	Falkirk	7	1
5	(Scotland) Craig Reid	Queen of the South	3	2
6	(Scotland) Stuart Kettlewell	Ross County	5	1
6	(Scotland) Mark Fotheringham	Livingston	5	1
6	(Scotland) Paul Watson	Livingston	5	1
9	(Morocco) Farid El Alagui	Falkirk	8	0
9	(Scotland) Stephen McKenna	Queen of the South	8	0

== Awards ==
Month	First Division Manager of the Month		SFL Player of the Month		SFL Young player of the Month		Ginger Boot	
Month	Manager	Club	Player	Club	Player	Club	Player	Club
August	(Scotland) Allan Moore	Greenock Morton	(Scotland) Dougie Imrie	Hamilton Academical	(Scotland) Craig Sibbald	Falkirk	Third division player	
September	(Scotland) Steven Pressley	Falkirk	(Morocco) Farid El Alagui	Falkirk	Second division player		(Scotland) Peter MacDonald	Greenock Morton
October	(Scotland) Derek Adams (Scotland) Steven Pressley	Ross County; Falkirk	(Scotland) Darren Dods (Scotland) Grant Munro	Falkirk; Ross County	(Scotland) Aaron Sinclair	Partick Thistle	Second division player	
November	(Scotland) Barry Smith	Dundee	(Scotland) Nicky Riley	Dundee	Second division player		Third division player	
December	(Scotland) Jackie McNamara	Partick Thistle	(Morocco) Farid El Alagui	Falkirk	Third division player		Third division player	
January	(Scotland) Steven Pressley	Falkirk	Third division player		Third division player		Third division player	
February	(Scotland) Steven Pressley	Falkirk	Second division player		(Scotland) Andy Ryan	Hamilton	Second division player	
March								
April								
