= Alistair Brown (footballer, born 1985) =

Scottish footballer

Personal information
- Date of birth: 12 December 1985 (age 40)
- Place of birth: Irvine, Scotland
- Height: 6 ft 1 in (1.85 m)
- Position: Goalkeeper

Senior career*
Years	Team	Apps	(Gls)
2003–2008	Hibernian	1	(0)
2003	→ Cowdenbeath (loan)	0	(0)
2005–2006	→ Raith Rovers (loan)	35	(0)
2006	→ Ayr United (loan)	0	(0)
2007	→ Ayr United (loan)	4	(0)
2007–2008	→ Stenhousemuir (loan)	24	(0)
2008–2010	Forfar Athletic	60	(0)
2010–2012	Stenhousemuir	25	(0)
2012–2013	Ayr United	18	(0)
2013–????	Hurlford United	?	(?)
Total		167+	(0+)
- * Club domestic league appearances and goals as of 21 July 2020

Alistair Brown (born 12 December 1985) is a Scottish retired football goalkeeper.

Brown has previously played for Hibernian, Cowdenbeath, Raith Rovers, Stenhousemuir, Forfar Athletic, Ayr United and Hurlford United.

== Career ==
Brown started his career at Hibernian, where he was frequently selected as the substitute goalkeeper, but rarely played. In fact, he only played in part of one Scottish Premier League match, coming on as a substitute for Simon Brown in a 2–1 win against Dunfermline on 18 December 2004. He didn't play in another first team match for Hibernian, despite being contracted with the club until 2008.

He spent most of the rest of his time with the club out on loan at various Scottish Football League clubs, including Ayr United and Raith Rovers. Brown initially joined Stenhousemuir on loan in October 2007. He then returned to Ochilview on loan in February 2008, having returned to Hibernian the previous month.

Brown signed for Forfar Athletic in the summer of 2008 on a free transfer. During his first season at Station Park, Brown played in a Scottish Cup tie against Rangers, where he came up against childhood contemporary Kris Boyd. Brown left Forfar at the end of the 2009–10 season, when he signed a one-year deal with Stenhousemuir.

Brown signed for Ayr United during the 2012 summer transfer window. He left Ayr United after the 2012–13 season and moved to junior club Hurlford United.

He has said to have retired in 2019.
