= David Sinclair (footballer, born 1990) =

Scottish footballer

Personal information
- Date of birth: 23 July 1990 (age 36)
- Place of birth: Glasgow, Scotland
- Height: 5 ft 9 in (1.75 m)
- Position: Midfielder

Team information
- Current team: Royal Albert (manager)

Senior career*
| Years | Team | Apps | (Gls) |
| 2006–2012 | Livingston | 114 | (6) |
| 2012–2013 | Ayr United | 32 | (7) |
| 2013–2014 | Airdrieonians | 25 | (1) |
| 2014 | BÍ/Bolungarvík | | |
| 2014–2015 | Clyde | 14 | (1) |
| 2015 | Mackay Wanderers | | |
| 2015–2016 | Stirling Albion | 1 | (0) |
| 2015 | → Irvine Meadow (loan) | | |
| 2016 | Bo'ness United | | |
| 2016 | Stenhousemuir | 2 | (0) |
| 2017–2021 | Caledonian Braves | 96 | (14) |
| 2021-2022 | Gartcairn | | |
| 2022 | Cambuslang Rangers | | |
| 2022-2023 | East Kilbride Thistle | | |

Managerial career
- 2026-: Royal Albert
- * Club domestic league appearances and goals as of 19:00, 10 December 2019 (UTC)

David Sinclair (born 23 July 1990, in Glasgow) is a former Scottish footballer who is the current manager of Royal Albert.

Sinclair started his career with Livingston, and has also played for Ayr United, Airdrieonians, Clyde, Stirling Albion, Stenhousemuir and East Kilbride Thistle. He has also played in Iceland for BÍ/Bolungarvík and Australia for Mackay Wanderers.

== Playing career ==
Sinclair signed for Livingston aged 12. He helped the club win Second Division and Third Division championships. Sinclair left Livingston after the 2011–12 season. He signed for Ayr United on 20 June 2013.

He signed for Airdrieonians in the summer of 2013, leaving the club in January 2014. After leaving Airdrieonians Sinclair signed for Icelandic club BÍ/Bolungarvík. He soon left the club after realizing he'd have to work in a fish processing plant in the town as part of his contract.

On 8 July 2014, Sinclair signed for Clyde. He left the club on 10 January 2015. In October 2015, Sinclair signed a short-term deal with Scottish League Two side Stirling Albion.

On 13 November 2015, Sinclair signed for Irvine Meadow XI F.C. on loan until January 2016.

Sinclair had spells at Bo'ness United, Stenhousemuir, Caledonian Braves, Gartcairn and Cambuslang Rangers before signing for East Kilbride Thistle in 2022.

== Managerial career ==
He was appointed manager of West of Scotland Football League side Royal Albert in October 2026.
