= Jon McShane =

Scottish footballer

Personal information
- Date of birth: 14 September 1991 (age 35)
- Place of birth: Paisley, Scotland
- Height: 6 ft 2 in (1.88 m)
- Position: Striker

Team information
- Current team: Hampton East Brighton FC
- Number: 19

Youth career
- St Mirren

Senior career*
Years	Team	Apps	(Gls)
2010–2012	St Mirren	9	(0)
2010–2011	→ Dumbarton (loan)	29	(13)
2012	→ Hamilton Academical (loan)	17	(9)
2012–2014	Hamilton Academical	28	(2)
2014	Celtic Nation		
2014–2015	East Fife	18	(4)
2015	→ Stranraer (loan)	12	(3)
2015–2016	Stenhousemuir	6	(0)
2016–2021	Altona Magic SC		
2022–2023	Dandenong City SC		
2023–2025	FC Clifton Hill		
2025–	Hampton East Brighton FC		
- * Club domestic league appearances and goals as of 28 August 2025 (UTC)

Jon McShane (born 14 September 1991) is a Scottish professional footballer who most recently played for Stenhousemuir. He previously played for St Mirren, Dumbarton, Hamilton Academical, Celtic Nation, East Fife and Stranraer. He now resides in Australia and currently plays for Hampton East Brighton FC.

== Career ==
Born in Paisley, McShane began his career with St Mirren and came through the youth system from the age of 12. McShane spent the 2010–11 season on loan at Dumbarton where he scored 13 goals in 29 games before returning to St Mirren for the 2011–2012 season. McShane joined Hamilton Academical on loan in January 2012. After he returned to St Mirren a permanent deal was agreed for McShane to join Hamilton Academical for an undisclosed fee.

On 25 January 2014, McShane was released by Hamilton Academical. On 28 March 2014, he signed for Celtic Nation of the Northern League Division One.

On 23 May 2014, McShane signed for East Fife and then on 9 January 2015, moved on loan to Stranraer until June 2015.

In 2016, McShane moved to Australia, signing for Altona Magic SC in the Victorian State League Division 1, the fourth tier of Australian soccer league system. McShane scored 17 goals in 21 games in his first season in Australia, the second highest tally in the league as his side won the championship. The following season, McShane scored 12 goals in 21 games as his side claimed back-to-back State League 1 championships, this time, with the league system opened up, helping his side achieve promotion to the National Premier Leagues Victoria 2 where he has signed for Altona Magic leading his team to consecutive titles and promotion to the top tier of Victorian football scoring 31 goals thus far. In the NPL2, Magic made it three consecutive league titles and achieved promotion to the top tier of football in Victoria, with McShane grabbing 17 goals in 27 games, the highest in the NPL2 West conferences and second highest in the NPL2 overall, with only Apai Ukuno scoring more (18).

== Career statistics ==
Appearances and goals by club, season and competition
Club	Season	League			Scottish Cup		League Cup		Other		Total	
Club	Season	Division	Apps	Goals	Apps	Goals	Apps	Goals	Apps	Goals	Apps	Goals
St Mirren	2010–11	Scottish Premier League	0	0	0	0	0	0	0	0	0	0
St Mirren	2011–12	Scottish Premier League	9	0	1	0	3	0	0	0	13	0
St Mirren	Total		9	0	1	0	3	0	0	0	13	0
Dumbarton (loan)	2010–11	Scottish Second Division	29	13	1	0	1	0	0	0	31	13
Hamilton Academical (loan)	2011–12	Scottish First Division	17	9	0	0	0	0	1 (Note: Appearance(s) in Scottish Challenge Cup)	0	18	9
Hamilton Academical	2012–13	Scottish First Division	15	2	0	0	2	0	0	0	17	2
Hamilton Academical	2013–14	Scottish Championship	13	0	1	0	3	0	1	0	18	0
Hamilton Academical	Total		28	2	1	0	5	0	1	0	35	2
East Fife	2014–15	Scottish League Two	18	4	2	2	1	0	3	3	24	9
Stranraer (loan)	2014–15	Scottish League One	12	3	0	0	0	0	2 (Note: Appearance(s) in Scottish League One play-offs)	0	14	3
Stenhousemuir	2015–16	Scottish League One	6	0	0	0	1	0	3	0	10	0
Career total			119	31	5	2	11	0	10	3	145	36
