= Victoria Park, Dingwall =

Football stadium in Dingwall, Scotland

Victoria Park
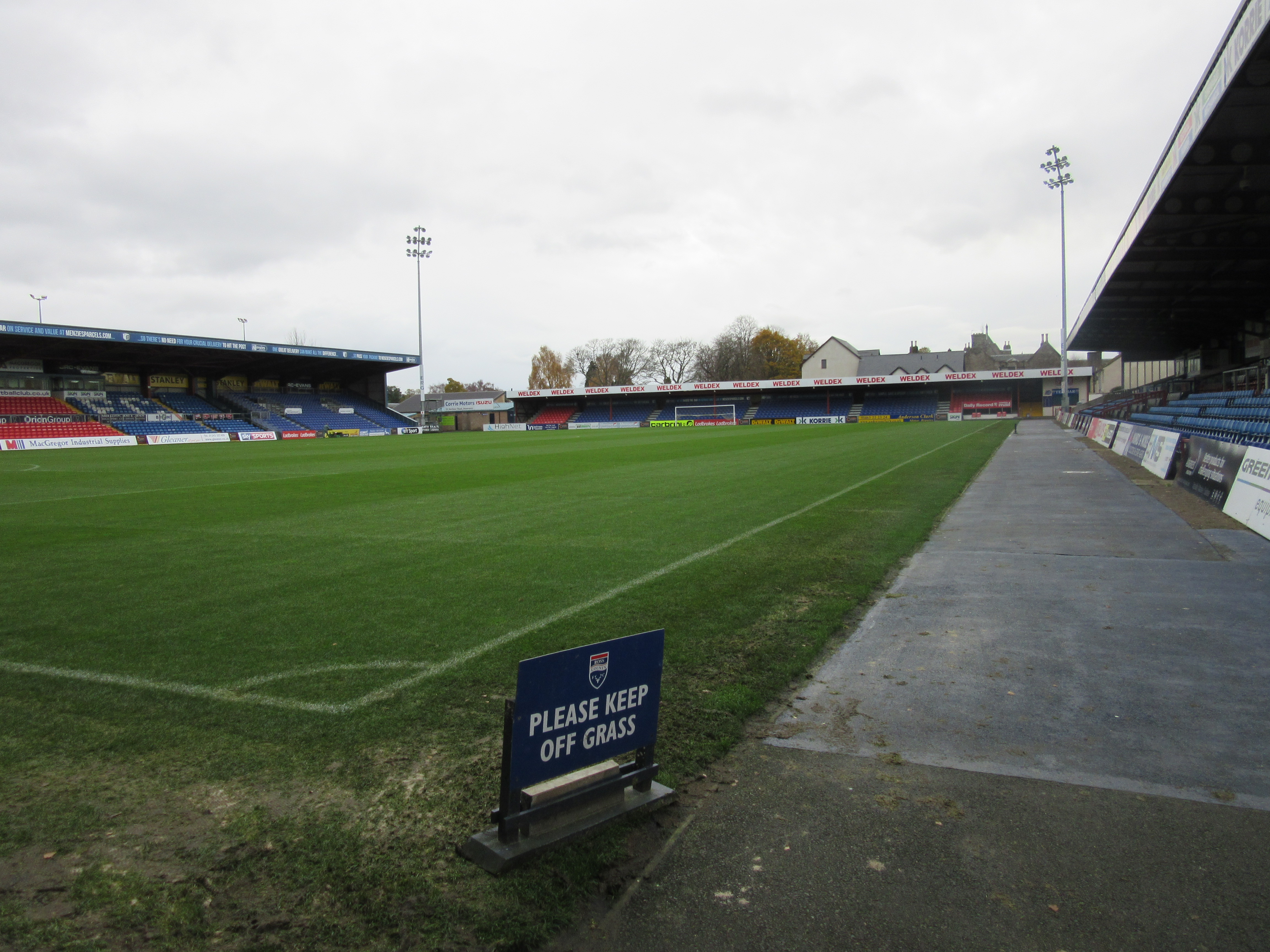

- Location in Ross and Cromarty
- Location: Jubilee Road, Dingwall, Ross-shire, Scotland
- Coordinates: 57°35′45″N 4°25′08″W
- Owner: Ross County F.C.
- Capacity: 6,541 all-seated
- Surface: Grass
- Field size: 110 × 75 yards

Construction
- Opened: 1929

Tenant
- Ross County F.C.: 1929–present

Victoria Park, also known as the Global Energy Stadium for sponsorship reasons, is an all-seater football stadium in the town of Dingwall, Highland, Scotland. It is the home ground of Ross County, who currently play in the Scottish League One.

== History ==
Victoria Park has a greater capacity than the population of Dingwall, which was 5,491 at the 2011 census. However the County of Ross and Cromarty, from which the club draws much of its support, has a population of over 60,000. The largest crowd ever to watch a match at Victoria Park was reported as 8,000, for the Scottish Cup match between Ross County and Rangers in February 1966. The revenue from this match helped to fund construction of the Jail End terrace.

Ross County played in the Highland League until 1994, when they were admitted to the Scottish Football League Third Division alongside Inverness Caledonian Thistle. Victoria Park then became the most northerly ground in the senior section of the Scottish football league system, until Elgin City were admitted in 2000.

Ross County gained promotion to the Scottish Premier League (SPL) by winning the 2011–12 Scottish First Division. The stadium was renovated in the spring and summer of 2012 to meet SPL criteria. This involved installing seats in the Jail End, constructing a new North Stand, installing undersoil heating and providing more car parking. Victoria Park was renamed the Global Energy Stadium, after the company founded by Ross County chairman Roy MacGregor, when the renovation was completed in July 2012.

== Structure and facilities ==
There are four all-seated stands: the West (Main Stand) and the East are on either side of the pitch, while the North Stand (Academy End) and the South Stand (Jail End) are behind each goal. The Jail End is so called because the old County Jail and Sheriff Court were behind it. The jails have since been converted to housing, but the Sheriff Court is still used. Away fans are housed in the Academy End. Home fans occupy all other sections of the stadium. There are corporate hospitality facilities and executive boxes in both the East and West Stands. The Sheriff Court is now closed.

The Dingwall campus of the Highland Football Academy is situated behind the Academy End. It has a three-quarter size 3G astroturf pitch under cover and a full-size Astroturf pitch adjacent to the East Stand, which has markings for football, 5-a-side football and field hockey. The academy also has three full-size grass pitches, plus additional grassed training and warm-up areas.

== Gallery ==
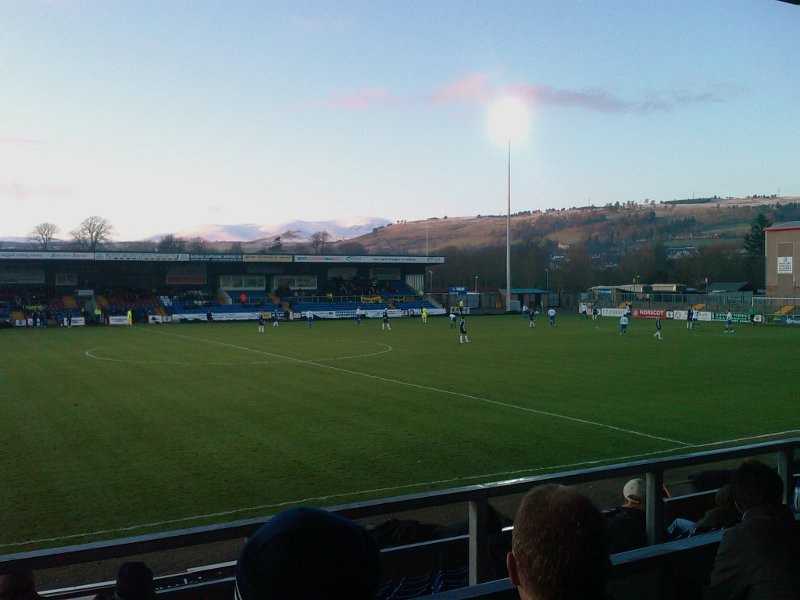
West Stand

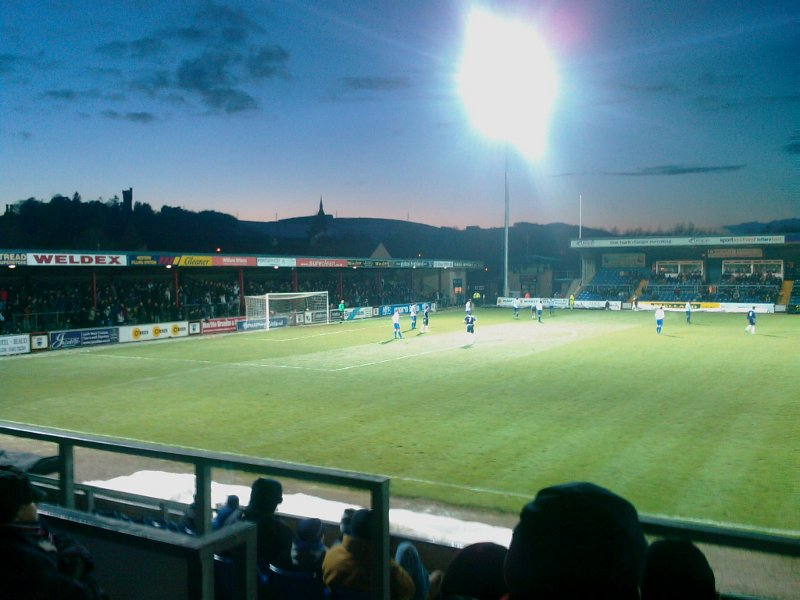
Jail End

== Sources ==
- Inglis, Simon (1996). Football Grounds of Britain. Collins Willow. ISBN 0-00-218426-5.
