= John Robertson (footballer, born 1976) =

Scottish footballer

Personal information
- Full name: John Alexander Robertson
- Date of birth: 28 March 1976 (age 50)
- Place of birth: Irvine, Scotland
- Position: Defender

Senior career*
Years	Team	Apps	(Gls)
1994–1997	Stranraer	68	(1)
1997–2000	Ayr United	83	(1)
2000–2001	Oxford United	40	(0)
2001–2002	Ayr United	36	(2)
2002–2004	St Johnstone	46	(0)
2004–2005	Ross County	25	(0)
2005–2006	Hamilton Academical	24	(2)
2006–2011	Partick Thistle	133	(2)
2011–2014	Ayr United	47	(1)
Total		502	(9)
- * Club domestic league appearances and goals

John Alexander Robertson (born 28 March 1976) is a Scottish former professional footballer.

Robertson played for several Scottish clubs, including Ayr United, St Johnstone, Hamilton and Partick Thistle. During his time at Thistle, he initially played at right back, but later played at right centre-back and occasionally sweeper.
