= Ross Robertson (footballer) =

Scottish footballer (born 1991)

Personal information
- Full name: Ross Robertson
- Date of birth: 3 June 1991 (age 35)
- Place of birth: Irvine, Scotland
- Position: Striker

Team information
- Current team: Hurlford United

Youth career
- 2009–2010: Ayr United

Senior career*
Years	Team	Apps	(Gls)
2010–2013	Ayr United	55	(4)
2013	→ Glenafton Athletic (loan)	16	(6)
2013	Glenafton Athletic	?	(?)
2013–2016	Hurlford United	133	(74)
2016–2017	Troon	?	(?)
2017–19	Hurlford United	64	(32)
2022–	Maybole Juniors	?	(?)
- * Club domestic league appearances and goals as of 25 August 2018

Ross Robertson is a Scottish professional footballer who plays for Super League Premier Division side Hurlford United.

He has previously played in the Scottish Football League First Division for Ayr United.

== Career ==
=== Ayr United ===
Robertson signed for Ayr United on the 19 October 2009, making his first team debut on 24 July 2010 as a substitute in the Scottish Challenge Cup. With his Scottish Second Division debut coming on 7 August 2010 against Brechin City. In all, he made 30 appearances scoring two goals during the 2010–11 season helping them win promotion to the First Division via the playoffs whilst playing in a variety of roles, mainly out wide or in his natural position as striker, but also occasionally as a fill-in centre-back.

On 1 June 2012, Ross signed a new one-year deal with Ayr for season 2012–13.

=== Glenafton Athletic ===
In the search of first-team football after falling out of favour at Ayr, Robertson moved on loan to Junior side Glenafton Athletic in February 2013, and after impressing with six goals in 16 appearances a permanent move followed at the end of that season after his contract at Ayr was not renewed.

=== Hurlford United & Troon ===
After the Manager who signed him for Glenafton Athletic, Darren Henderson, left New Cumnock for Premier League newcomers Hurlford United, Ross followed suit and signed on at Blair Park in the summer of 2013 alongside fellow Glens players Paul McKenzie and brothers Glen and Danny Mitchell.

Ross signed for Super League Premier Division side Troon on 22 June 2016 after his contract expired at Blair Park, before returning to Hurlford after just one season.
