= Stevie O'Reilly =

Scottish football referee

- Full name: Stevie O'Reilly
- Born: December 13, 1966 (age 59); Scotland
- Height: 5 ft 7 in (1.70 m)

Domestic
| Years | League | Role |
| 1995–2014 | Scottish Football Association | Referee |
| 2005–2013 | SFL / SPL | Referee |
| 2013–2014 | SPFL | Referee |

Stevie O'Reilly (born 13 December 1966) is a Scottish former football referee who was active in the Scottish Premier League. He also refereed at youth internationals and has been the fourth official in the UEFA Champions League and UEFA Cup in season 2007–08.
