= Jonathan Tiffoney =

Scottish footballer

Personal information
- Full name: Jonathan Tiffoney
- Date of birth: 7 May 1991 (age 35)
- Place of birth: Glasgow, Scotland
- Position: Right-back

Youth career
- 2007–2010: Ayr United

Senior career*
Years	Team	Apps	(Gls)
2010–2013	Ayr United	59	(1)
2013	Alloa Athletic	4	(0)
2013	Limerick	0	(0)
2013–2015	Alloa Athletic	36	(3)
2016–2019	Brechin City	29	(2)
2019–2021	Stenhousemuir	31	(1)
Total		159	(6)
- * Club domestic league appearances and goals

Jonathan Tiffoney (born 7 May 1991) is a Scottish former footballer who last played for Stenhousemuir as a right-back in 2021.

He also previously played for Ayr United, Alloa Athletic (two spells), Limerick and Brechin City.

== Club career ==
Jonathan Tiffoney began his career with the Ayr United Youth Academy, joining the first team squad prior to the 2010-11 season. He made his first competitive start for Ayr United against Airdrie United at Recreation Park, Alloa. After establishing himself in the right back position, he signed a contract to stay at Ayr until 2012. Tiffoney scored an own goal in the Play-off Final at Glebe Park against Brechin City. He scored his first goal for Ayr against Raith Rovers at Somerset Park in the Boxing Day fixture. At the end of the 2011-12 season, Tiffoney was given the official 'Young Player of the Year' by the club, voted by the club's supporters. In 2018, he sued Ayr United over their refusal to allow him to leave on a transfer to Dundee in 2012.

In January 2013, Tiffoney signed for Alloa Athletic, playing four games for the club. He then joined Limerick ahead of the 2013 League of Ireland season, but left the club shortly after, and in March 2013 returned for a second spell at Alloa. On 15 May 2013, Tiffoney scored as Alloa defeated Dunfermline Athletic 3-0 in the first leg of the SFL First Division play-off which Alloa won over two legs to gain promotion to the First Division. On 28 July 2013, Tiffoney signed a new contract with Alloa; however, due to a contract dispute with Ayr United, he was only able to sign as an amateur.

Tiffoney signed for Scottish League One club Brechin City in July 2015. He signed for Stenhousemuir on 15 November 2019.

On 29 April 2021, during a match against Albion Rovers, Tiffoney allegedly taunted Rovers player David Cox over his mental health issues. Cox left the stadium at half-time and stated he was retiring from football. Tiffoney denied the allegations and claimed it was Cox that verbally abused him. In a statement, Tiffoney said "I did not abuse him. I would never attack another player’s mental health or wellbeing and will fully cooperate with the Scottish FA investigation into this matter." Tiffoney was later released by Stenhousemuir and charged by the SFA due to the incident. It was Tiffoney's last game in football as he was not signed by another club.

== International career ==
He has played at under-21 level for Scotland, in a closed door friendly match against Greenock Morton at Cappielow, in which he provided the cross for the winner.

== Personal life ==
He is the older brother of fellow footballer, Scott Tiffoney.

=== Criminal conviction ===
In August 2014, Jonathan was found guilty of secretly filming himself having sex with a woman. Tiffoney shared the video amongst his friends; he was also convicted of spitting at the woman. After being found guilty, Tiffoney subject of an 18-month community payback order which required him to complete 15 hours of unpaid work and was put on the sex offenders' register for 18 months.
