= 2008–09 Dumbarton F.C. season =

Dumbarton
2008-09 season
- Manager: Jim Chapman
- Stadium: Strathclyde Homes Stadium, Dumbarton
- Scottish League Division 3: 1st
- Scottish Cup: Third Round
- Scottish League Cup: Second Round
- League Challenge Cup: First Round
- Top goalscorer: League: Ross Clark (14); All: Ross Clark (15)
- Highest home attendance: 1396
- Lowest home attendance: 462
- Average home league attendance: 712

Season 2008–09 was the 125th football season in which Dumbarton competed at a Scottish national level, entering the Scottish Football League for the 103rd time, the Scottish Cup for the 114th time, the Scottish League Cup for the 62nd time and the Scottish Challenge Cup for the 18th time.

== Overview ==
Jim Chapman's first full season in charge began with a large intake of new playing staff. A slow start however was to be replaced by an unbeaten run of 8 games which saw Dumbarton rise to 2nd place by the beginning of November. Mixed results in December through February meant that Dumbarton fell to 4th place, but still in with a playoff chance. However it was to be a final surge which saw 7 wins taken from the last 8 games which pushed Dumbarton to the Third Division title. Indeed that run brought about Dumbarton's record number of consecutive 'shut-outs' - 7 in all.

In the Scottish Cup, a second round victory over Highland League opponents Fraserburgh was followed by a close encounter with First Division Ross County, which was only decided by the odd goal in three and that after a draw.

In the League Cup, Dumbarton defeated Annan Athletic on penalties, but were to be overwhelmed by Premier Division St Mirren in the second round.

Finally, it was yet another League Challenge Cup first round exit, to Airdrie United.

Locally, the Stirlingshire Cup was not competed for.

== Results & fixtures ==
Win Draw Loss

=== Scottish Third Division ===
2 August 2008 Scottish Third Division	Dumbarton	1–1	Montrose	Dumbarton Football Stadium
	Clark 83' (pen.)		Stewart 26'	Attendance: 580; Referee: S Nicholls

9 August 2008 Scottish Third Division	Elgin City	1–1	Dumbarton	Borough Briggs
	McKay 24'		Logan 75'	Attendance: 462; Referee: C Boyle

16 August 2008 Scottish Third Division	Berwick Rangers	1–2	Dumbarton	Shielfield Park
	Gribben 40'		Lennon 55'; Tiernan 61'	Attendance: 516; Referee: G Hilland

23 August 2008 Scottish Third Division	Dumbarton	1–2	Stenhousemuir	Dumbarton Football Stadium
	Keegan 71'		Motion 23'; Shirra 90'	Attendance: 660; Referee: B Colvin

30 August 2008 Scottish Third Division	Dumbarton	1–1	East Stirlingshire	Dumbarton Football Stadium
	Murray 25'		McKenzie 69'	Attendance: 592

13 September 2008 Scottish Third Division	Albion Rovers	1–3	Dumbarton	Cliftonhill
	Walker, P 61' (pen.)		Clark 8'; McLeod 18'; Gordon 60' (pen.)	Attendance: 327; Referee: B Winter

20 September 2008 Scottish Third Division	Dumbarton	2–1	Cowdenbeath	Dumbarton Football Stadium
	Carcary 36'; Gordon 90'		McQuade 90'	Attendance: 801; Referee: S O'Reilly

27 September 2008 Scottish Third Division	Forfar Athletic	2–2	Dumbarton	Station Park, Forfar
	Russell 57'; Gibson, G 79'		Tulloch 7' (OG); McLeod 52'	Attendance: 431; Referee: F McDermott

4 October 2008 Scottish Third Division	Dumbarton	4–1	Annan Athletic	Dumbarton Football Stadium
	Watson 6' (OG); Keegan 30'; Clark 34' (pen.); Hill 45' (OG)		Inglis 59'	Attendance: 539; Referee: S Finnie

18 October 2008 Scottish Third Division	Montrose	1–2	Dumbarton	Borough Briggs
	Black 90'		Clark 32'; McLeod 51'	Attendance: 673; Referee: A Law

1 November 2008 Scottish Third Division	Dumbarton	5–2	Berwick Rangers	Dumbarton Football Stadium
	McLeod 9'; Clark 19', 62'; Murray 34'; Cusack 75'		Anderson Craig 32'; Ewart 83'	Attendance: 673; Referee: C Brown

8 November 2008 Scottish Third Division	Stenhousemuir	1–1	Dumbarton	Ochilview
	Brand 61'		Murray 62'	Attendance: 723; Referee: A Law

15 November 2008 Scottish Third Division	East Stirlingshire	5–2	Dumbarton	Firs Park
	Graham 22', 60'; Rodgers 44' (pen.); Donaldson 46'; Dunn 64'		Carcary 87'; Moore 90'	Attendance: 516; Referee: S McLean

22 November 2008 Scottish Third Division	Dumbarton	1–1	Albion Rovers	Dumbarton Football Stadium
	Clark 42'		Donnelly 37'	Attendance: 646; Referee: Mat Northcroft

13 December 2008 Scottish Third Division	Dumbarton	3–0	Forfar Athletic	Dumbarton Football Stadium
	Chisholm 24'; McLeod 67'; Keegan 88'			Attendance: 539; Referee: S Finnie

20 December 2008 Scottish Third Division	Annan Athletic	2–1	Dumbarton	Galabank
	Neilson 42', 90'		Clark 45' (pen.)	Attendance: 634; Referee: C Allan

10 January 2009 Scottish Third Division	Cowdenbeath	2–0	Dumbarton	Central Park, Cowdenbeath
	Adamson 18'; McQuade 80'			Attendance: 416; Referee: G Salmond

17 January 2009 Scottish Third Division	Dumbarton	1–0	Stenhousemuir	Dumbarton Football Stadium
	Chisholm 42'			Attendance: 425; Referee: B Madden

24 January 2009 Scottish Third Division	Berwick Rangers	1–2	Dumbarton	Shielfield Park
	Callaghan 28'		McLeod 21'; Carcary 43'	Attendance: 425; Referee: T Robertson

31 January 2009 Scottish Third Division	Dumbarton	1–1	Montrose	Dumbarton Football Stadium
	Carcary 5'		Hunter 54'	Attendance: 652; Referee: S Nicholls

21 February 2009 Scottish Third Division	Dumbarton	1–1	Cowdenbeath	Dumbarton Football Stadium
	Boyle 33'		Dempster 57'	Attendance: 692; Referee: E Norris

28 February 2009 Scottish Third Division	East Stirlingshire	3–1	Dumbarton	Firs Park
	Stevenson 5'; Cramb 67' (pen.); Rodgers 87'		Clark 39'	Attendance: 526; Referee: C Brown

3 March 2009 Scottish Third Division	Dumbarton	2–0	East Stirlingshire	Dumbarton Football Stadium
	McLaughlin 22'; Craig 32'			Attendance: 462

7 March 2009 Scottish Third Division	Dumbarton	1–0	Albion Rovers	Dumbarton Football Stadium
	Boyle 68'			Attendance: 692; Referee: J McKendrick

10 March 2009 Scottish Third Division	Dumbarton	2–0	Elgin City	Dumbarton Football Stadium
	McLaughlin 35'; Carcary 67'			Attendance: 471; Referee: N Watters

14 March 2009 Scottish Third Division	Montrose	1–0	Dumbarton	Links Park
	McKenzie 65'			Attendance: 343; Referee: Mat Northcroft

17 March 2009 Scottish Third Division	Albion Rovers	1–1	Dumbarton	Cliftonhill
	Barr 71'		Clark 90'	Attendance: 535; Referee: G Hilland

21 March 2009 Scottish Third Division	Dumbarton	0–2	Annan Athletic	Dumbarton Football Stadium
			Neilson 20'; Jack 39'	Attendance: 815; Referee: S McLean

31 March 2009 Scottish Third Division	Elgin City	0–2	Dumbarton	Borough Briggs
			Edwards 39' (OG); McLaughlin 67'	Attendance: 271; Referee: G Hilland

4 April 2009 Scottish Third Division	Stenhousemuir	0–2	Dumbarton	Ochilview
			Lennon 44'; Clark 76'	Attendance: 588; Referee: G Salmond

7 April 2009 Scottish Third Division	Forfar Athletic	0–2	Dumbarton	Station Park, Forfar
			Clark 55', 73'	Attendance: 513; Referee: N Watters

11 April 2009 Scottish Third Division	Dumbarton	2–0	Berwick Rangers	Dumbarton Football Stadium
	Forbes 15'; Boyle 64'			Attendance: 702; Referee: B Colvin

18 April 2009 Scottish Third Division	Cowdenbeath	0–0	Dumbarton	Central Park, Cowdenbeath
				Attendance: 1,181; Referee: S Finnie

25 April 2009 Scottish Third Division	Dumbarton	4–0	Forfar Athletic	Dumbarton Football Stadium
	Smith 4' (OG); McLaughlin 25'; Carcary 33'; Brannan 80'			Attendance: 539; Referee: S Finnie

2 May 2009 Scottish Third Division	Dumbarton	6–0	Elgin City	Dumbarton Football Stadium
	Carcary 13', 34', 43', 66'; McLaughlin 28'; Murray 84'			Attendance: 1,396; Referee: E Smith

9 May 2009 Scottish Third Division	Annan Athletic	1–3	Dumbarton	Galabank
	Watson 66'		Clark 23'; McLaughlin 28'; Carcary 88'	Attendance: 1,343; Referee: G Salmond

=== Alba Challenge Cup ===
26 July 2008 Scottish Challenge Cup round 1	Airdrie United	3–2	Dumbarton	Excelsior Stadium
	Noble 53'; Cardle 58'; Di Giacomo 75'		Clark 25'; Carcary 43'	Attendance: 808

=== Co-operative Insurance League Cup ===
5 August 2009 Scottish League Cup round 1	Dumbarton	1–1 (a.e.t.) (5-4 p)	Annan Athletic	Dumbarton Football Stadium
	Logan 115'		Jack 103' (pen.)	Attendance: 464

26 August 2009 Scottish League Cup round 1	St Mirren	7–0	Dumbarton	Love Street (stadium)
	Robb 18'; Mehmet 33', 50', 52'; Dorman 39'; Dargo 75'; Mason 77'			Attendance: 1,747

=== Homecoming Scottish Cup ===
25 October 2008 Scottish Cup round 2	Fraserburgh	0–1	Dumbarton	Bellslea Park
			Chisholm	Attendance: 517; Referee: B Colvin

29 November 2008 Scottish Cup round 3	Ross County	2–2	Dumbarton	Victoria Park, Dingwall
	Higgins 23', 57'		Carcary 80', 83'	Attendance: 1,200

15 December 2008 Scottish Cup round 3	Dumbarton	1–2	Ross County	Dumbarton Football Stadium
	Gordon 46'		Brittain 24' (pen.); Hart 37'	Attendance: 557

=== Pre-season ===
10 July 2008 Friendly	Queen's Park	2–3	Dumbarton	Hampden Park
	Goal		Geggan; Keegan; Gourlay

12 July 2008 Friendly	Rangers XI	2–2	Dumbarton	Ibrox Park
	Goal		Keegan; Gray

15 July 2008 Friendly	Stenhousemuir	0–2	Dumbarton	Ochilview
			O'Byrne; Chisholm

18 July 2008 Friendly	Dumbarton	0–1	Morton	Dumbarton Football Stadium
			Goal	Attendance: 562

22 July 2008 Friendly	Dumbarton	2–2	St Mirren	Dumbarton Football Stadium
	O'Byrne; Murray		Brady; Molloy	Attendance: 683

23 July 2008 Friendly	Dumbarton	1–3	Hamilton	Dumbarton Football Stadium
	Carcary		Stevenson; McCarthy; Akins	Attendance: 312

30 July 2008 Friendly	Rangers XI	1–2	Dumbarton	Ibrox Park
	Goal		Logan; Tiernan

14 August 2008 Friendly	Vale of Leven	1–2	Dumbarton	Millburn Park
	Goal		Weir; McCuiag

== League table ==
Pos	Team	Pld	W	D	L	GF	GA	GD	Pts	Promotion or qualification
1	Dumbarton (C, P)	36	19	10	7	65	36	+29	67	Promotion to the Second Division
2	Cowdenbeath (P)	36	18	9	9	48	34	+14	63 (Note: Cowdenbeath were promoted due to Livingston's demotion from the First Division to the Third.)	Qualification for the Second Division Play-offs (Note: The 2nd, 3rd and 4th placed teams will be entered into a play-off with the Second Division's 9th placed team. The winning team will be awarded a place in the 2009–10 Second Division.)
3	East Stirlingshire	36	19	4	13	57	50	+7	61	Qualification for the Second Division Play-offs
4	Stenhousemuir (O, P)	36	16	8	12	55	46	+9	56	Qualification for the Second Division Play-offs
5	Montrose	36	16	6	14	47	48	−1	54	

Source: BBC Sport
Rules for classification: 1) points; 2) goal difference; 3) number of goals scored.
(C) Champions; (O) Play-off winners; (P) Promoted

== Player statistics ==
=== Squad ===
No.	Pos	Nat	Player	Total		Third Division		League Cup		Challenge Cup		Scottish Cup	
No.	Pos	Nat	Player	Apps	Goals	Apps	Goals	Apps	Goals	Apps	Goals	Apps	Goals
	GK	(Scotland) SCO	Dave McEwan	27	0	22+0	0	2+0	0	1+0	0	2+0	0
	GK	(Scotland) SCO	Mark McGeown	16	0	14+1	0	0+0	0	0+0	0	1+0	0
	GK	(Scotland) SCO	Michael White	1	0	1+0	0	0+0	0	0+0	0	0+0	0
	DF	(Scotland) SCO	Pat Boyle	20	3	20+0	3	0+0	0	0+0	0	0+0	0
	DF	(Scotland) SCO	Craig Brittain	4	0	3+0	0	1+0	0	0+0	0	0+0	0
	DF	(Scotland) SCO	Iain Chisholm	32	3	15+12	2	1+1	0	0+0	0	2+1	1
	DF	(Scotland) SCO	Mick Dunlop	23	0	21+0	0	0+0	0	0+0	0	2+0	0
	DF	(Scotland) SCO	Ben Gordon	42	4	36+0	3	2+0	0	1+0	0	3+0	1
	DF	(Scotland) SCO	Gordon Lennon	39	1	32+2	1	1+1	0	0+1	0	2+0	0
	DF	(Scotland) SCO	Richie McKillen	2	0	2+0	0	0+0	0	0+0	0	0+0	0
	DF	(Scotland) SCO	Michael O'Byrne	19	0	13+0	0	2+0	0	1+0	0	3+0	0
	DF	(Scotland) SCO	Gary Wilson	11	0	8+0	0	1+0	0	1+0	0	1+0	0
	MF	(Scotland) SCO	Kieran Brannan	7	1	0+6	1	0+1	0	0+0	0	0+0	0
	MF	(Scotland) SCO	Mark Canning	24	0	10+10	0	0+0	0	1+0	0	2+1	0
	MF	(Scotland) SCO	Ross Clark	37	15	30+1	14	2+0	0	1+0	1	3+0	0
	MF	(Scotland) SCO	Ross Forbes	18	1	15+3	1	0+0	0	0+0	0	0+0	0
	MF	(Scotland) SCO	Andy Geggan	30	0	23+2	0	1+0	0	1+0	0	3+0	0
	MF	(Scotland) SCO	Alan Gourlay	5	0	0+3	0	2+0	0	0+0	0	0+0	0
	MF	(Scotland) SCO	David Gray	9	0	2+5	0	0+1	0	1+0	0	0+0	0
	MF	(Scotland) SCO	Raymond Logan	9	1	4+2	1	2+0	0	0+1	0	0+0	0
	MF	(Scotland) SCO	Kieran McAnespie	4	0	2+2	0	0+0	0	0+0	0	0+0	0
	MF	(Scotland) SCO	Martin McNiff	1	0	0+1	0	0+0	0	0+0	0	0+0	0
	MF	(Scotland) SCO	Ryan McStay	12	0	10+2	0	0+0	0	0+0	0	0+0	0
	MF	(Scotland) SCO	Stevie Murray	41	4	34+1	4	2+0	0	1+0	0	3+0	0
	MF	(Scotland) SCO	Fergus Tiernan	7	1	2+2	1	0+2	0	0+1	0	0+0	0
	FW	(Scotland) SCO	Derek Carcary	37	14	25+8	11	1+0	0	1+0	1	1+1	2
	FW	(Scotland) SCO	Paul Craig	3	1	3+0	1	0+0	0	0+0	0	0+0	0
	FW	(Scotland) SCO	Liam Cusack	11	1	1+8	1	0+0	0	0+0	0	0+2	0
	FW	(Scotland) SCO	Paul Keegan	27	3	12+9	3	2+0	0	1+0	0	1+2	0
	FW	(Scotland) SCO	Denis McLaughlin	16	6	16+0	6	0+0	0	0+0	0	0+0	0
	FW	(Scotland) SCO	Paul McLeod	27	6	19+5	6	0+0	0	0+0	0	2+1	0
	FW	(Scotland) SCO	Michael Moore	8	1	0+6	1	0+0	0	0+0	0	2+0	0
	FW	(Scotland) SCO	Nathan Taylor	1	0	0+1	0	0+0	0	0+0	0	0+0	0
	FW	(Scotland) SCO	Steven Weir	1	0	1+0	0	0+0	0	0+0	0	0+0	0

=== Transfers ===
==== Players in ====
Player	From	Date
(Scotland) Mick Dunlop	(Scotland) Queen's Park	25 May 2008
(Scotland) Paul Keegan	(Scotland) Partick Thistle	25 May 2008
(Scotland) Dave McEwan	(Northern Ireland) Derry City	28 May 2008
(Scotland) Iain Chisholm	(Scotland) Albion Rovers	13 Jun 2008
(Scotland) Mark McGeown	(Scotland) Ayr United	13 Jun 2008
(Scotland) Alan Gourlay	(Scotland) Vale of Leven	19 Jun 2008
(Scotland) Ross Clark	(Scotland) Alloa Athletic	27 Jun 2008
(Scotland) Stevie Murray	(Scotland) Partick Thistle	1 Jul 2008
(Scotland) Derek Carcary	(Scotland) Raith Rovers	7 Jul 2008
(Scotland) David Gray	(Scotland) Kilbirnie Ladeside	7 Jul 2008
(Scotland) Gary Wilson	(Scotland) Pollok	7 Jul 2008
(Scotland) Martin McNiff	(Scotland) Leven Valley Am	9 Jul 2008
(Scotland) Ben Gordon	(Scotland) Strathclyde Univ	22 Jul 2008
(Scotland) Michael White	(Scotland) Alloa Athletic	25 Jul 2008
(Scotland) Steven Weir	(Scotland) Livingston	9 Aug 2008
(Scotland) Raymond Logan	(Scotland) Pollok	26 Aug 2008
(Scotland) Paul McLeod	(Scotland) Hamilton	1 Sep 2008
(Scotland) Alan Cook	(Scotland) St Mirren Youth	8 Oct 2008
(Scotland) Nathan Taylor	(Scotland) Gretna	17 Jan 2009
(Scotland) Ross Forbes	(Scotland) Motherwell (loan)	23 Jan 2009
(Scotland) Kieran McAnespie	(Scotland) Morton (loan)	30 Jan 2009
(Scotland) Pat Boyle	(England) Everton	31 Jan 2009
(Scotland) Ryan McStay	(Scotland) Partick Thistle	3 Feb 2009
(Scotland) Denis McLaughlin	(Scotland) Hearts (loan)	21 Feb 2009
(Scotland) Paul Craig	(Scotland) Benburb	3 Mar 2009

==== Players out ====
Player	To	Date
(Scotland) David Crawford	(Scotland) Queen's Park	12 Jun 2008
(Scotland) Tommy Coyne	(Scotland) Albion Rovers	15 Jul 2008
(Scotland) Greg Cavanagh	(Scotland) St Anthonys	1 Aug 2008
(Scotland) Kenny Haswell	(Scotland) Kirkintilloch Rob Roy	1 Aug 2008
(Scotland) Steven Weir	(Scotland) Arbroath	21 Aug 2008
(Scotland) Chris Hamilton	(Scotland) Stirling Albion	22 Aug 2008
(Scotland) Alan Gourlay	(Scotland) Vale of Leven	10 Oct 2008
(Scotland) Craig Brittain		2 Jan 2009
(Scotland) David Gray		31 Jan 2009
(Scotland) Jason McLaughlin		31 Jan 2009
(Scotland) Liam Cusack	(Scotland) Annan Athletic	2 Feb 2009
(Scotland) Michael Moore	(Scotland) Stranraer	27 Feb 2009
(Finland) Axel Orrström	(Finland) AC Oulu	
(Scotland) David Craig	(Scotland) Arthurlie	
(Scotland) Peter Shaw	(Scotland) Arthurlie	
(Scotland) Brian McPhee	(Scotland) Bathgate Thistle	
(Scotland) Jonathan Yule	(Scotland) Benburb	
(Scotland) Craig Potter	(Scotland) Cumnock	
(Scotland) Chris Gentile	(Scotland) Kirkintilloch Rob Roy	
(Scotland) Paul McQuilken	(Scotland) Kirkintilloch Rob Roy	
(Scotland) Anton Nugent	(Scotland) Kirkintilloch Rob Roy	
(Scotland) David McNaught	(Scotland) Vale of Leven	
(Scotland) Ryan Russell	(Scotland) Vale of Leven	
(Scotland) Richie McKillen	(Scotland) Glenafton Athletic	
(Scotland) Raymond Logan	(Scotland)	
(Scotland) Michael Stokes	(Scotland)	

== Trivia ==
- The League match against Annan Athletic on 9 May marked Andy Geggan's 100th appearance for Dumbarton in all national competitions - the 130th Dumbarton player to reach this milestone.

== See also ==
- 2008–09 in Scottish football
