= 2009–10 Dumbarton F.C. season =

Dumbarton
2009-10 season
- Manager: Jim Chapman
- Stadium: Strathclyde Homes Stadium, Dumbarton
- Scottish League Division 2: 6th
- Scottish Cup: Third Round
- Scottish League Cup: First Round
- League Challenge Cup: First Round
- Top goalscorer: League: Scott Chaplain (10); All: Scott Chaplain (10)
- Highest home attendance: 975
- Lowest home attendance: 397
- Average home league attendance: 681

Season 2009–10 was the 126th football season in which Dumbarton competed at a Scottish national level, entering the Scottish Football League for the 104th time, the Scottish Cup for the 115th time, the Scottish League Cup for the 63rd time and the Scottish Challenge Cup for the 19th time.

== Overview ==
Following the success of the previous season, it was manager Jim Chapman's goal to consolidate the club's position in the Second Division. However, Dumbarton were to be devastated before a ball was kicked with the death during the close season of the club captain, Gordon Lennon, from a motoring accident. Nevertheless, despite there being few changes to the playing staff, the league campaign started disappointingly with only two draws to show from the first six starts - resulting in the club propping up the rest of the league. It was, however, to be a temporary blip and although there was no consistency in performances, a mid-table sixth place was achieved in the end.

In the domestic cups, however, it was all bad news - no wins and no goals! In the Scottish Cup, local rivals Morton would be victorious in the third round, after a goalless draw.

In the League Cup, Dunfermline Athletic had no difficulty in seeing off Dumbarton in the first round.

Finally, it was no surprise that the League Challenge Cup would witness another first round exit, and it would be Morton again who would do the damage.

Locally, the Stirlingshire Cup was resumed, and after two penalty shoot out wins in the group fixtures, the trophy would return to Dumbarton following a win in the final over Stenhousemuir.

== Results & fixtures ==
Win Draw Loss

=== Scottish Second Division ===
8 August 2009	Dumbarton	1–3	Alloa Athletic	Dumbarton Football Stadium
	Grant 53' (o.g.)		Grant 43'; Carrigan 59'; Noble 61'	Attendance: 864; Referee: Anthony Law

15 August 2009	Arbroath	3–1	Dumbarton	Gayfield Park
	Sellars 15'; Hislop 46'; Ross 90'		Hunter 89'	Attendance: 605; Referee: E Norris

22 August 2009	Dumbarton	3–3	Clyde	Dumbarton Football Stadium
	Dunlop 45'; Hunter 53'; Chisholm 86'		Lithgow 15', 24'; McLaughlan 65'	Attendance: 975; Referee: Bobby Madden

29 August 2009	Brechin City	3–1	Dumbarton	Glebe Park, Brechin
	Docherty 21'; McAllister 36'; Janczyk 59'		Dunlop 26'	Attendance: 470; Referee: Frank McDermott

12 September 2009	Dumbarton	0–0	Stenhousemuir	Dumbarton Football Stadium
				Attendance: 664; Referee: Stevie O'Reilly

19 September 2009	Dumbarton	0–3	Cowdenbeath	Dumbarton Football Stadium
			McBride 15', 53'; Wardlaw 23'	Attendance: 647; Referee: Gary Hilland

26 September 2009	Peterhead	1–2	Dumbarton	Balmoor Stadium
	Bruce 52'		Murray 77'; Carcary 90'	Attendance: 397; Referee: Stevie Nicholls

3 October 2009	Dumbarton	2–3	Stirling Albion	Dumbarton Football Stadium
	Chaplain 30'; Cook 41'		McKenna 32'; Devine 51'; Robertson 90'	Attendance: 654; Referee: S McLean

10 October 2009	East Fife	0–1	Dumbarton	Bayview Stadium
			McLaughlin 58'	Attendance: 684; Referee: Gary Hilland

17 October 2009	Alloa Athletic	1–3	Dumbarton	Recreation Park
	Gilhaney 41'		Geggan 16'; Cook 44'; Chaplain 62'	Attendance: 575; Referee: N Watters

24 October 2009	Dumbarton	1–0	Arbroath	Dumbarton Football Stadium
	Chaplain 45'			Attendance: 696; Referee: Mat Northcroft

31 October 2009	Dumbarton	0–0	Brechin City	Dumbarton Football Stadium
				Attendance: 687; Referee: Thomas Robertson

7 November 2009	Stenhousemuir	0–3	Dumbarton	Ochilview
			Hunter 49'; Chaplain 64'; O'Donoghue 89'	Attendance: 568; Referee: John McKendrick

14 November 2009	Cowdenbeath	2–1	Dumbarton	Central Park, Cowdenbeath
	McQuade 18' (pen.), 82'		Geggan 5'	Attendance: 389; Referee: Ian Brines

8 December 2009	Dumbarton	1–0	Peterhead	Dumbarton Football Stadium
	Chaplain 30' (pen.)			Attendance: 397; Referee: Stevie Nicholls

12 December 2009	Dumbarton	0–3	East Fife	Dumbarton Football Stadium
			McManus 37'; Smart 53'; Muir 89'	Attendance: 628; Referee: George Salmond

15 December 2009	Stirling Albion	2–2	Dumbarton	Forthbank Stadium
	Murphy 61'; Devine 88'		Craig 49'; Carcary 84'	Attendance: 462; Referee: Brian Colvin

23 January 2010	Dumbarton	2–1	Cowdenbeath	Dumbarton Football Stadium
	Hunter 65'; Clark 89'		Baxter 29'	Attendance: 657; Referee: Bobby Madden

6 February 2010	East Fife	2–3	Dumbarton	Bayview Stadium
	Crawford 13', 35'		Gordon 5'; Chaplain 15'; Carcary 38'	Attendance: 581; Referee: John Beaton

16 February 2010	Dumbarton	2–4	Stirling Albion	Dumbarton Football Stadium
	Gordon 4'; Hunter 45'		Robertson 1', 49'; Aitken 12', 34'	Attendance: 595; Referee: S McLean

27 February 2010	Arbroath	3–1	Dumbarton	Gayfield Park
	Dorris 55'; Redman 74'; Booth 88'		Winters 9'	Attendance: 521; Referee: Stevie O'Reilly

2 March 2010	Peterhead	2–1	Dumbarton	Balmoor Stadium
	Sharp 13', 79'		Wyness 27'	Attendance: 327; Referee: S MacDonald

6 March 2010	Dumbarton	0–1	Brechin City	Dumbarton Football Stadium
			Byers 57'	Attendance: 751; Referee: Gary Hilland

9 March 2010	Dumbarton	3–1	Alloa Athletic	Dumbarton Football Stadium
	Gordon 17'; Cook 47'; Clark 56' (pen.)		Smith 62' (o.g.)	Attendance: 552; Referee: C Brown

13 March 2010	Stenhousemuir	1–0	Dumbarton	Ochilview
	Quinn 87'			Attendance: 469; Referee: William Collum

16 March 2010	Clyde	0–2	Dumbarton	Broadwood Stadium
			Winters 27', 62'	Attendance: 531; Referee: Thomas Robertson

20 March 2010	Cowdenbeath	0–0	Dumbarton	Central Park, Cowdenbeath
				Attendance: 349; Referee: Frank McDermott

23 March 2010	Dumbarton	2–1	Stenhousemuir	Dumbarton Football Stadium
	Chaplain 45', 68' (pen.)		Lyle 65'	Attendance: 486; Referee: Iain Brines

27 March 2010	Dumbarton	1–3	Peterhead	Dumbarton Football Stadium
	Chaplain 49'		Wilson 55'; Bavidge 58'; Mann 80'	Attendance: 663; Referee: David Somers

3 April 2010	Stirling Albion	1–2	Dumbarton	Forthbank Stadium
	Taggart 51'		Wyness 54', 81'	Attendance: 568; Referee: Kevin Clancy

6 April 2010	Brechin City	0–1	Dumbarton	Glebe Park, Brechin
			Chaplain 56'	Attendance: 403; Referee: Matt Northcroft

10 April 2010	Dumbarton	0–1	East Fife	Dumbarton Football Stadium
			Linn 85'	Attendance: 728; Referee: Stevie Nicholls

13 April 2010	Dumbarton	3–3	Clyde	Dumbarton Football Stadium
	Carcary 21', 40'; Winters 45'		Strachan 29' (pen.), 79' (pen.); McGowan N 63'	Attendance: 601; Referee: Anthony Law

17 April 2010	Alloa Athletic	1–2	Dumbarton	Recreation Park
	Scott 55' (pen.)		Winters 33'; Wyness 65'	Attendance: 622; Referee: S MacDonald

24 April 2010	Dumbarton	0–2	Arbroath	Dumbarton Football Stadium
			Redman 39'; Megginson 49'	Attendance: 836; Referee: Stephen Finnie

1 May 2010	Clyde	4–2	Dumbarton	Broadwood Stadium
	Sawers 2'; Stewart 15', 19'; Strachan 84'		McStay 33'; Wyness 83'	Attendance: 631; Referee: Frank McDermott

=== Alba Challenge Cup ===
26 July 2009 Scottish Challenge Cup round 1	Dumbarton	0–1	Greenock Morton	Dumbarton Football Stadium
			Jenkins 25'	Attendance: 1,122; Referee: Stephen Finnie

=== Co-operative Insurance League Cup ===
1 August 2009 Scottish League Cup round 1	Dumbarton	0–5	Dunfermline Athletic	Dumbarton Football Stadium
			Graham 2'; Kirk 9', 56'; Burke 45'; Bell 65'	Attendance: 953; Referee: Chris Boyle

=== Active Nation Scottish Cup ===
28 November 2009 Scottish Cup round 3	Greenock Morton	0–0	Dumbarton	Cappielow
				Attendance: 1,882; Referee: S McLean

5 December 2009 Scottish Cup round 3R	Dumbarton	0–1	Greenock Morton	Dumbarton Football Stadium
			Graham 74'	Attendance: 1,495; Referee: S McLean

=== Stirlingshire Cup ===
28 July 2009 Round 1	Dumbarton	2–2*	East Stirlingshire	Dumbarton Football Stadium
	McKillen; Hunter		Goal

4 August 2009 Round 1	Stirling Albion	1–1*	Dumbarton	Forthbank Stadium
	Goal		Hunter	Attendance: 250

13 October 2009 Final	Stenhousemuir	0–2	Dumbarton	Ochilview
			Hunter; Martin McNiff	Attendance: 250

* - won on penalties

=== Scottish Brewers Challenge Cup ===
18 July 2009 Semi Final	Queen of the South	1–1 (7–6 p)	Dumbarton	Galabank
	Goal		Hunter	Attendance: 810

19 July 2009 3rd place	Annan Athletic	3–3 (4–2 p)	Dumbarton	Galabank
	Goal		Gribben; Hunter	Attendance: 205

=== Pre-season/Other Matches ===
14 July 2009 Friendly	Dumbarton	0–2	Partick Thistle	Dumbarton Football Stadium
			Robertson 40'; Doolan 86'	Attendance: 926

16 July 2009 Friendly	Dumbarton	0–3	St Mirren	Dumbarton Football Stadium
			O'Donnell; Dargo; Mehmet	Attendance: 1,109

22 July 2009 Friendly	Dumbarton	0–5	Middlesbrough	Dumbarton Football Stadium
			O'Neil 6'; Dunlop 42' (o.g.); Aliadière 45'; Johnson, A 70'; Williams 73'	Attendance: 1,227

15 November 2009 Friendly	Dumbarton	2–1	Gordon Lennon Select	Dumbarton Football Stadium
	Boyle; Brannan		Craig	Attendance: 732; Referee: D Somers

== League table ==
Pos	Team	Pld	W	D	L	GF	GA	GD	Pts	Promotion, qualification or relegation
4	Brechin City	36	15	9	12	47	42	+5	54	Qualification for the First Division play-offs (Note: The 2nd, 3rd and 4th placed teams will be entered into a play-off with the First Division's 9th placed team. The winning team will be awarded a place in the 2010–11 First Division.)
5	Peterhead	36	15	6	15	45	49	−4	51	
6	Dumbarton	36	14	6	16	49	58	−9	48	
7	East Fife	36	10	11	15	46	53	−7	41	
8	Stenhousemuir	36	9	13	14	38	42	−4	40	

Source: Scottish Football League
Rules for classification: 1) points; 2) goal difference; 3) number of goals scored.

== Player statistics ==
=== Squad ===
No.	Pos	Nat	Player	Total		Second Division		League Cup		Challenge Cup		Scottish Cup	
No.	Pos	Nat	Player	Apps	Goals	Apps	Goals	Apps	Goals	Apps	Goals	Apps	Goals
	GK	(Scotland) SCO	Dave McEwan	4	0	2+0	0	1+0	0	1+0	0	0+0	0
	GK	(Scotland) SCO	Mark McGeown	1	0	1+0	0	0+0	0	0+0	0	0+0	0
	GK	(Czech Republic) CZE	Jan Vojacek	26	0	24+0	0	0+0	0	0+0	0	2+0	0
	GK	(Scotland) SCO	Michael White	11	0	9+2	0	0+0	0	0+0	0	0+0	0
	DF	(Scotland) SCO	Iain Chisholm	35	1	27+4	1	1+0	0	1+0	0	2+0	0
	DF	(Scotland) SCO	Mick Dunlop	38	2	34+0	2	1+0	0	1+0	0	2+0	0
	DF	(Scotland) SCO	Ben Gordon	38	3	34+0	3	1+0	0	1+0	0	2+0	0
	DF	(Scotland) SCO	Ross Harvey	1	0	1+0	0	0+0	0	0+0	0	0+0	0
	DF	(Scotland) SCO	Richie McKillen	2	0	0+0	0	1+0	0	1+0	0	0+0	0
	DF	(Scotland) SCO	Chris Smith	36	0	34+0	0	0+0	0	0+0	0	2+0	0
	MF	(Scotland) SCO	Kieran Brannan	13	0	5+8	0	0+0	0	0+0	0	0+0	0
	MF	(Scotland) SCO	Scott Chaplain	38	10	29+5	10	0+1	0	0+1	0	2+0	0
	MF	(Scotland) SCO	Ross Clark	26	2	14+8	2	1+0	0	1+0	0	0+2	0
	MF	(Scotland) SCO	Alan Cook	10	3	10+0	3	0+0	0	0+0	0	0+0	0
	MF	(Scotland) SCO	Chris Craig	17	1	16+1	1	0+0	0	0+0	0	0+0	0
	MF	(Scotland) SCO	Andy Geggan	31	2	27+0	2	0+1	0	1+0	0	2+0	0
	MF	(Scotland) SCO	Martin McNiff	17	0	13+2	0	1+0	0	0+0	0	0+1	0
	MF	(Scotland) SCO	Ryan McStay	26	1	19+4	1	0+0	0	1+0	0	2+0	0
	MF	(Scotland) SCO	Stevie Murray	36	1	17+15	1	1+0	0	1+0	0	2+0	0
	MF	(Scotland) SCO	Ross O'Donoghue	23	1	15+4	1	1+0	0	0+1	0	2+0	0
	MF	(Scotland) SCO	Adam Strachan	3	0	1+2	0	0+0	0	0+0	0	0+0	0
	FW	(Scotland) SCO	Derek Carcary	35	5	9+22	5	1+0	0	1+0	0	0+2	0
	FW	(Scotland) SCO	Roddy Hunter	24	5	14+6	5	0+1	0	0+1	0	2+0	0
	FW	(Scotland) SCO	Simon Lynch	1	0	0+1	0	0+0	0	0+0	0	0+0	0
	FW	(Scotland) SCO	Denis McLaughlin	16	1	10+4	1	1+0	0	1+0	0	0+0	0
	FW	(Scotland) SCO	David Winters	15	5	15+0	5	0+0	0	0+0	0	0+0	0
	FW	(Scotland) SCO	Dennis Wyness	17	5	16+1	5	0+0	0	0+0	0	0+0	0

=== Transfers ===
==== Players in ====
Player	From	Date
(Scotland) Ross O'Donoghue	(Scotland) Elgin City	22 Jun 2009
(Scotland) Scott Chaplain	(Scotland) Partick Thistle	30 Jun 2009
(Scotland) Roddy Hunter	(Scotland) Montrose	14 Jul 2009
(Scotland) Denis McLaughlin	(Scotland) Hearts (loan)	24 Jul 2009
(Scotland) Chris Craig	(Scotland) Rangers	4 Aug 2009
(Scotland) Chris Smith	(Scotland) Morton	4 Aug 2009
(Scotland) Simon Lynch	(Scotland) Airdrie United (loan)	15 Aug 2009
(Scotland) Ross Harvey	(Scotland) Rangers	28 Aug 2009
(Czech Republic) Jan Vojacek	(Czech Republic) SK Sigma Olomouc	28 Aug 2009
(Scotland) Adam Strachan	(Scotland) Albion Rovers	18 Sep 2009
(Scotland) Dennis Wyness	(Scotland) St Mirren	11 Feb 2010
(Scotland) David Winters	(Scotland) Arbroath	12 Mar 2010

==== Players out ====
Player	To	Date
(Scotland) Michael O'Byrne	(Scotland) Albion Rovers	2 Jun 2009
(Scotland) Mark Canning	(Scotland) Albion Rovers	3 Jun 2009
(Scotland) Fergus Tiernan	(Scotland) Queen's Park	1 Jul 2009
(Scotland) Pat Boyle	(Scotland) Partick Thistle	10 Jul 2009
(Scotland) Paul Keegan	(Scotland) Airdrie United	22 Jul 2009
(Scotland) Paul McLeod	(Scotland) Clyde	22 Jul 2009
(Scotland) David McFarlane	(Scotland) Albion Rovers	23 Jul 2009
(Scotland) Mark McGeown	(Scotland) Queen of the South	16 Oct 2009
(Scotland) Adam Strachan	(Scotland) Clyde	13 Nov 2009
(Scotland) Nathan Taylor	(England) Clitheroe	1 Jan 2010
(Scotland) Paul Craig	Freed	25 Mar 2010
(Scotland) Chris Craig	(Scotland) Alloa Athletic	1 Apr 2010
(Scotland) Ross Harvey	(United States) Embry Riddle Eagles	
(Scotland) Gary Wilson	(Scotland) Larkhall Thistle	
(Scotland) Dave McEwan	(Scotland) Beith	

== See also ==
- 2009–10 in Scottish football
