= 2010–11 Stenhousemuir F.C. season =

Stenhousemuir
2010–11 season
- Chairman: Martin McNairney
- Manager: John Coughlin; Davie Irons
- Stadium: Ochilview Park
- Scottish Second Division: 8th
- Challenge Cup: Quarter-final (eliminated by Peterhead)
- League Cup: First round (eliminated by Brechin City)
- Scottish Cup: Fourth round (eliminated by Stranraer)
- Top goalscorer: League: Grant Anderson (7); All: Alex Williams (12)
- Highest home attendance: 837 vs. Livingston, 9 April 2011
- Lowest home attendance: 363 vs. Peterhead, 26 February 2011
- Average home league attendance: 560

The 2010–11 season was Stenhousemuir's second consecutive season in the Scottish Second Division, having been promoted from the Scottish Third Division at the end of the 2008–09 season. Stenhousemuir also competed in the Challenge Cup, League Cup and the Scottish Cup.

== Summary ==
Stenhousemuir finished Eighth in the Second Division. They reached the Quarter-final of the Challenge Cup, the first round of the League Cup and the fourth round of the Scottish Cup.

=== Management ===
Stenhousemuir began the 2010–11 season under the management of John Coughlin. On 11 December 2010, Coughlin resigned as manager following their defeat to East Fife. Coaches Graeme Robertson and Kevin McGoldrick took over as caretaker managers. On 30 December 2010, Davie Irons was appointed as manager.

== Results and fixtures ==
Win Draw Loss

=== Scottish Second Division ===
7 August 2010	Stenhousemuir	3–1	Peterhead	Ochilview Park
	Clark 17', 68'; Williams 50'	BBC Report	Donald 37'	Attendance: 423; Referee: Law

14 August 2010	Brechin City	0–0	Stenhousemuir	Glebe Park
		BBC Report		Attendance: 404; Referee: Allan

21 August 2010	Stenhousemuir	0–1	Alloa Athletic	Ochilview Park
		BBC Report	Prunty 13'	Attendance: 619; Referee: Murray

28 August 2010	Stenhousemuir	1–3	Airdrie United	Ochilview Park
	Fusco (red card) 46'; Williams 69'; Lyle (yellow card) 85' (red card)	SFL Report	McCord 38'; Lovering 46' (pen.); Gemmill 90+1'	Attendance: 820; Referee: Clancy

11 September 2010	Dumbarton	1–0	Stenhousemuir	Strathclyde Homes Stadium
	Carcary 77'	BBC Report		Attendance: 600; Referee: Charleston

18 September 2010	Stenhousemuir	3–0	Forfar Athletic	Ochilview Park
	Quinn 4', 69'; Scullion 72'	BBC Report		Attendance: 522; Referee: Allan

25 September 2010	Ayr United	2–0	Stenhousemuir	Somerset Park
	McCann 45'; McKay 87'	BBC Report		Attendance: 1,065; Referee: Richmond

2 October 2010	Stenhousemuir	1–1	East Fife	Ochilview Park
	Murray 66'	BBC Report	Ovenstone 51'	Attendance: 679; Referee: Hilland

16 October 2010	Livingston	4– 1	Stenhousemuir	Braidwood Motor Company Stadium
15:00	Winters 14'; Scullion 23' (og.); Conway 24'; Russell 40'	BBC Report	Lyle 28'	Attendance: 1,606; Referee: Conroy

23 October 2010	Stenhousemuir	4–0	Dumbarton	Ochilview Park
	Quinn 3'; Clark 22' (pen.), 43'; Plenderleith 89'	BBC Report		Attendance: 392; Referee: Northcroft

30 October 2010	Airdrie United	1–0	Stenhousemuir	Excelsior Stadium
	Bain 73'	SFL Report		Attendance: 848; Referee: Richmond

6 November 2010	Stenhousemuir	0–0	Brechin City	Ochilview Park
		BBC Report		Attendance: 491; Referee: Smith

13 November 2010	Alloa Athletic	1–0	Stenhousemuir	Recreation Park
	Prunty 55'	BBC Report		Attendance: 455; Referee: Watters

11 December 2010	East Fife	6–0	Stenhousemuir	Bayview Stadium
	Muir 19'; Crawford 32', 68'; Johnstone 33'; Sloan 45'; Linn 61'	BBC Report		Attendance: 472; Referee: Clancy

2 January 2011	Stenhousemuir	2–3	Alloa Athletic	Ochilview Park
	Anderson 89'; Thom 90+3'	BBC Report	Noble 12'; McGowan 15'; Gormley 72'	Attendance: 459; Referee: Colvin

15 January 2011	Dumbarton	0–1	Stenhousemuir	Strathclyde Homes Stadium
		BBC Report	Dalziel 90+3'	Attendance: 490; Referee: Beaton

22 January 2011	Stenhousemuir	1–0	Airdrie United	Ochilview Park
	Murray 84'	SFL Report		Attendance: 819; Referee: McKendrick

29 January 2011	Ayr United	4–3	Stenhousemuir	Somerset Park
	Roberts 6' (pen.), 63'; Trouten (red card) 43'; Lauchlan 51'; Robertson 54'; Tiffoney (yellow card) 90+4' (red card)	BBC Report	Clark 33' (pen.); Lynch 77'; Smith 87'	Attendance: 1,181; Referee: Watters

5 February 2011	Stenhousemuir	0–1	Forfar Athletic	Ochilview Park
		BBC Report	Bolochoweckyj 14'; Fotheringham (red card) 20'	Attendance: 504; Referee: Robertson

12 February 2011	Stenhousemuir	0–2	East Fife	Ochilview Park
		BBC Report	Young 45'; Linn 48'	Attendance: 590; Referee: Norris

19 February 2011	Livingston	2–1	Stenhousemuir	Braidwood Motor Company Stadium
15:00	Russell 34'; Barr 40'; Talbot (red card) 60'	BBC Report	Williams 64'	Attendance: 1,246; Referee: Alan Muir

26 February 2011	Stenhousemuir	4–2	Peterhead	Ochilview Park
	Williams 29'; Dalziel 40'; Anderson 45+1'; Lynch 88'	BBC Report	Emslie 35'; McDonald 38'	Attendance: 363; Referee: Charleston

1 March 2011	Stenhousemuir	3–1	Ayr United	Ochilview Park
	Dalziel 36'; Smith 53'; Williams 64' (pen.)	BBC Report	Bannigan 5'	Attendance: 484; Referee: McKendrick

5 March 2011	Brechin City	3–1	Stenhousemuir	Glebe Park
	McAllister 43'; Redman 55'; Janczyk 82'	BBC Report	Dalziel 8'	Attendance: 503; Referee: Finnie

8 March 2011	Stenhousemuir	1–2	Livingston	Ochilview Park
19:30	Williams 76'	BBC Report	Russell 3'; De Vita 31'	Attendance: 431; Referee: Richmond

19 March 2011	Airdrie United	2–2	Stenhousemuir	Excelsior Stadium
	Owens 16', 81'	SFL Report	Devlin 14'; Lynch 42'	Attendance: 642; Referee: Somers

22 March 2011	Peterhead	2–2	Stenhousemuir	Balmoor
	Wyness 41', 61' (pen.)	BBC Report	Anderson 35', 39'	Attendance: 384; Referee: Northcroft

26 March 2011	Stenhousemuir	2–1	Livingston	Ochilview Park
	Lynch 3'; Devlin 90+3'	BBC Report	Roberts 90'	Attendance: 568; Referee: Madden

29 March 2011	Stenhousemuir	2–2	Dumbarton	Ochilview Park
	Thomson (yellow card) 69' (red card); Paton 80' (pen.); Hunter 83'	BBC Report	McShane 50', 68'	Attendance: 398; Referee: Beaton

2 April 2011	Forfar Athletic	1–1	Stenhousemuir	Station Park
	Dow 16'	BBC Report	Devlin (red card) 62'; Anderson 78'	Attendance: 416; Referee: Norris

9 April 2011	Stenhousemuir	0–3	Livingston	Ochilview Park
15:00		BBC Report	Jacobs 35'; Fox 59'; Sinclair 90'	Attendance: 837; Referee: Beaton

12 April 2011	Forfar Athletic	2–0	Stenhousemuir	Station Park
	Templeman 37'; Dow 45+2'	BBC Report		Attendance: 347; Referee: Beaton

16 April 2011	East Fife	1–1	Stenhousemuir	Bayview Stadium
	Durie 56'	BBC Report	Murray 90+1'	Attendance: 562; Referee: Watters

23 April 2011	Alloa Athletic	1–2	Stenhousemuir	Recreation Park
	Walker 20'	BBC Report	Anderson 57'; Paton 61'	Attendance: 584; Referee: Madden

30 April 2011	Stenhousemuir	1–3	Brechin City	Ochilview Park
	Devlin 27'; McCluskey (yellow card) 90+4' (red card)	BBC Report	McAllister 5' (pen.), 45', 90+6' (pen.)	Attendance: 672; Referee: Clancy

7 May 2011	Peterhead	0–3	Stenhousemuir	Balmoor
		BBC Report	Anderson 42'; Paton 68'; Dalziel 75'	Attendance: 405; Referee: Colvin

=== Scottish Challenge Cup ===
24 July 2010 Round 1	Stenhousemuir	3–2	Annan Athletic	Ochilview Park
	Watson 29' (o.g.); Williams 43', 45'	BBC Report	Halsman 89'; Muirhead 90+1'	Attendance: 223; Referee: McLean

10 August 2010 Round 2	Stenhousemuir	4–1	Dundee	Ochilview Park
	Williams 9'; Anderson 16'; Quinn 63'; Motion 83'	BBC Report	Griffiths 74'	Attendance: 665; Referee: Brines

5 September 2010 Quarter-final	Peterhead	3–1	Stenhousemuir	Balmoor
	Wyness 9', 50'; Gethans 43'	BBC Report	Dalziel 76'	Attendance: 442; Referee: Colvin

=== Scottish League Cup ===
31 July 2010 Round 1	Stenhousemuir	1–3	Brechin City	Ochilview Park
	Anderson 8'	BBC Report	McLauchlan 18'; Molloy 29'; McAllister 53'	Attendance: 384; Referee: Beaton

=== Scottish Cup ===
20 November 2010 Round 3	Stenhousemuir	2–2	Threave Rovers	Ochilview Park
	Stirling 67'; Williams 90'	BBC Report	Middlemass 31'; Warren 56'	Attendance: 429; Referee: Robertson

12 January 2011 Round 3 replay	Threave Rovers	1–5	Stenhousemuir	Meadow Park
	Donley 48'	BBC Report	Clark 15', 25'; Williams 57', 67'; Smith 81'	Attendance: 240; Referee: Robertson

18 January 2011 Round 4	Stenhousemuir	0–0	Stranraer	Ochilview Park
		BBC Report		Attendance: 405; Referee: Somers

25 January 2011 Round 4 replay	Stranraer	4–3	Stenhousemuir	Stair Park
	One 19', 74'; Malcolm 44'; Murphy 49'	BBC Report	Dalziel 17'; Gallagher 45+2'; Clark 90'	Attendance: 521; Referee: Somers

== Player statistics ==
=== Squad ===
No.	Pos	Nat	Player	Total		Second Division		Challenge Cup		League Cup		Scottish Cup	
No.	Pos	Nat	Player	Apps	Goals	Apps	Goals	Apps	Goals	Apps	Goals	Apps	Goals
	GK	(Scotland) SCO	Alistair Brown	27	0	24+1	0	1+0	0	0+0	0	1+0	0
	GK	(Scotland) SCO	Chris McCluskey	19	0	12+1	0	2+0	0	1+0	0	3+0	0
	DF	(Scotland) SCO	Michael Devlin	10	3	10+0	3	0+0	0	0+0	0	0+0	0
	DF	(Scotland) SCO	Scott Fusco	10	0	5+2	0	2+0	0	1+0	0	0+0	0
	DF	(Scotland) SCO	Scott Gibb	25	0	21+1	0	1+0	0	1+0	0	1+0	0
	DF	(Scotland) SCO	Willie Lyle	42	1	35+0	1	3+0	0	0+0	0	4+0	0
	DF	(Scotland) SCO	Alistair Love	3	0	2+0	0	0+0	0	0+0	0	1+0	0
	DF	(Scotland) SCO	Jordan Smith	29	3	23+0	2	2+0	0	0+0	0	4+0	1
	DF	(Scotland) SCO	Stephen Thomson	9	0	5+0	0	3+0	0	1+0	0	0+0	0
	DF	(Scotland) SCO	Gary Thom	32	1	23+3	1	1+0	0	1+0	0	4+0	0
	MF	(Scotland) SCO	Grant Anderson	40	9	30+2	7	3+0	1	1+0	1	4+0	0
	MF	(Scotland) SCO	Ross Clark	22	8	11+4	5	3+0	0	1+0	0	3+0	3
	MF	(Scotland) SCO	Sean Dickson	27	0	21+2	0	0+0	0	0+0	0	4+0	0
	MF	(Scotland) SCO	Brian Gilmour	9	0	7+2	0	0+0	0	0+0	0	0+0	0
	MF	(Scotland) SCO	Michael Hunter	8	1	0+7	1	0+0	0	0+0	0	1+0	0
	MF	(Scotland) SCO	Kevin Motion	16	1	8+3	0	1+1	1	1+0	0	0+2	0
	MF	(Scotland) SCO	Mark McLennan	2	0	2+0	0	0+0	0	0+0	0	0+0	0
	MF	(Scotland) SCO	Stevie Murray	40	3	32+0	3	3+0	0	1+0	0	3+1	0
	MF	(Scotland) SCO	Eric Paton	18	3	18+0	3	0+0	0	0+0	0	0+0	0
	MF	(Scotland) SCO	Patrick Scullion	11	1	5+3	1	0+3	0	0+0	0	0+0	0
	MF	(Scotland) SCO	Adam Strachan	1	0	1+0	0	0+0	0	0+0	0	0+0	0
	MF	(Scotland) SCO	Lewis Sloan	9	0	2+7	0	0+0	0	0+0	0	0+0	0
	MF	(Scotland) SCO	Andrew Stirling	23	1	10+10	0	0+1	0	0+1	0	0+1	1
	MF	(Scotland) SCO	Iain Thomson	38	0	31+0	0	2+1	0	0+1	0	3+0	0
	FW	(Scotland) SCO	Mark Archdeacon	1	0	0+1	0	0+0	0	0+0	0	0+0	0
	FW	(Scotland) SCO	Kieran Connachan	1	0	1+0	0	0+0	0	0+0	0	0+0	0
	FW	(Scotland) SCO	Scott Dalziel	30	7	17+6	5	2+1	1	0+1	0	3+0	1
	FW	(Scotland) SCO	Stuart Love	4	0	2+2	0	0+0	0	0+0	0	0+0	0
	FW	(Scotland) SCO	Simon Lynch	17	4	11+6	4	0+0	0	0+0	0	0+0	0
	FW	(Scotland) SCO	Grant Plenderleith	13	1	0+10	1	0+0	0	0+0	0	1+2	0
	FW	(Scotland) SCO	Paul Quinn	30	4	15+8	3	1+1	1	1+0	0	0+4	0
	FW	(Scotland) SCO	Alex Williams	25	12	12+5	6	3+0	3	1+0	0	4+0	3

== League table ==
Pos	Team	Pld	W	D	L	GF	GA	GD	Pts	Promotion, qualification or relegation
6	Airdrie United	36	13	9	14	52	60	−8	48	
7	Dumbarton	36	11	7	18	52	70	−18	40	
8	Stenhousemuir	36	10	8	18	46	59	−13	38	
9	Alloa Athletic (R)	36	9	9	18	49	71	−22	36	Qualification for the Second Division play-offs
10	Peterhead (R)	36	5	11	20	47	76	−29	26	Relegation to the Third Division

Source: SPFL
Rules for classification: 1) points; 2) goal difference; 3) number of goals scored.
(R) Relegated
