= 2010–11 Alloa Athletic F.C. season =

Alloa Athletic
2010–11 season
- Chairman: Mike Mulraney
- Manager: Allan Maitland
- Stadium: Recreation Park
- Second Division: Ninth (relegated)
- Challenge Cup: First round, lost to Dundee
- League Cup: Second round, lost to Aberdeen
- Scottish Cup: Fourth round, lost to Hamilton Academical
- Highest home attendance: League: 688 vs. East Fife, 14 August 2010; 688 vs. Airdrie United, 9 April 2011
- Lowest home attendance: League: 375 vs. Brechin City, 19 March 2011

The 2010–11 season was Alloa Athletic's eighth consecutive season in the Scottish Second Division, having been relegated from the Scottish First Division at the end of season 2002–03. Alloa also competed in the Challenge Cup, League Cup and the Scottish Cup.

== Summary ==
Alloa finished ninth in the Second Division, entering the play-offs losing 2–1 to Annan Athletic on aggregate and were relegated to the Third Division. They reached the first round of the Challenge Cup, the second round of the League Cup and the fourth round of the Scottish Cup.

=== Management ===
They started season 2010–11 under the management of Allan Maitland. On 7 May 2011, Maitland was sacked by the club. Players Scott Walker and Brown Ferguson took over as caretaker managers for the play-offs.

== Results and fixtures ==
Win Draw Loss

=== Scottish Second Division ===
7 August 2010 Scottish Second Division	Livingston	3– 3	Alloa Athletic	Braidwood Motor Company Stadium
15:00	Jacobs 2'; Russell 21'; McAvoy 64' (o.g.)	BBC Report	Smith; Punty 57'; Scott 90' (pen.)	Attendance: 1,389; Referee: McDermott

14 August 2010 Scottish Second Division	Alloa Athletic	3–2	East Fife	Recreation Park
	Prunty 51'; McDonald 68'; Lister 77'	BBC Report	Johnstone 54'; Smart 65'	Attendance: 688; Referee: Finnie

21 August 2010 Scottish Second Division	Stenhousemuir	0–1	Alloa Athletic	Ochilview Park
		BBC Report	Prunty 13'	Attendance: 619; Referee: Murray

28 August 2010 Scottish Second Division	Brechin City	3–1	Alloa Athletic	Glebe Park
	Booth 20'; McAllister 21', 81'	BBC Report	Gormley 29'	Attendance: 418; Referee: Tumilty

11 September 2010 Scottish Second Division	Alloa Athletic	4–1	Ayr United	Recreation Park
	Lister 16'; Prunty 45'; McDonald 53' (pen.), 64' (pen.)	BBC Report	Smith 27'	Attendance: 641; Referee: Watters

18 September 2010 Scottish Second Division	Alloa Athletic	0–0	Dumbarton	Recreation Park
		BBC Report		Attendance: 559; Referee: Nicholls

25 September 2010 Scottish Second Division	Peterhead	1–0	Alloa Athletic	Balmoor
	Anderson 86'	BBC Report		Attendance: 534; Referee: McKendrick

2 October 2010 Scottish Second Division	Alloa Athletic	3–2	Forfar Athletic	Recreation Park
	McDonald 6', 17'; Gibson 29'	BBC Report	Tod 44'; Deasley 78'	Attendance: 436; Referee: Madden

16 October 2010 Scottish Second Division	Airdrie United	0–1	Alloa Athletic	Excelsior Stadium
	Stallard (yellow card) (red card) 77'; Devlin (red card) 73'	SFL Report	Prunty 34'	Attendance: 1,030; Referee: Robertson

23 October 2010 Scottish Second Division	Ayr United	2–1	Alloa Athletic	Somerset Park
	Roberts 36'; Grant 83' (o.g.)	BBC Report	McDonald 75' (pen.)	Attendance: 1,176; Referee: Law

30 October 2010 Scottish Second Division	Alloa Athletic	2–2	Brechin City	Recreation Park
	Dunlop 36'; Prunty 55'	BBC Report	Byers 22'; Bolger 69'	Attendance: 513; Referee: Muir

6 November 2010 Scottish Second Division	East Fife	4–1	Alloa Athletic	Bayview Stadium
	Linn 16'; Hislop 55'; Sloan 61' (pen.), 82'	BBC Report	Walker 50'	Attendance: 435; Referee: Allan

13 November 2010 Scottish Second Division	Alloa Athletic	1–0	Stenhousemuir	Recreation Park
	Prunty 55'	BBC Report		Attendance: 455; Referee: Watters

4 December 2010 Scottish Second Division	Alloa Athletic	2–2	Peterhead	Recreation Park
	Noble 35'; McDonald 90+1' (pen.)	BBC Report	Strachan 22' (pen.); Clark 44'	Attendance: 601; Referee: Smith

18 December 2010 Scottish Second Division	Alloa Athletic	2–3	Airdrie United	Recreation Park
	Noble 60'; Lister 70'	SFL Report	Ferguson 6'; Stevenson 89'; Watt 90'	Attendance: 502; Referee: Law

26 December 2010 Scottish Second Division	Alloa Athletic	2– 2	Livingston	Recreation Park
15:00	Noble 28'; Dunlop 45'	BBC Report	Sinclair 59'; De Vita 71'	Attendance: 566; Referee: Hilland

2 January 2011 Scottish Second Division	Stenhousemuir	2–3	Alloa Athletic	Ochilview Park
	Anderson 89'; Thom 93'	BBC Report	Noble 12'; McGowan 15'; Gormley 72'	Attendance: 459; Referee: Colvin

15 January 2011 Scottish Second Division	Alloa Athletic	0–1	Ayr United	Recreation Park
		BBC Report	Easton 64'	Attendance: 527; Referee: Northcroft

18 January 2011 Scottish Second Division	Dumbarton	4–1	Alloa Athletic	Strathclyde Homes Stadium
	McNiff 14'; Walker 41'; Carcary 53'; Geggan 80'	BBC Report	Gibson 56'	Attendance: 350; Referee: Norris

29 January 2011 Scottish Second Division	Peterhead	4–1	Alloa Athletic	Balmoor
	Wyness 22', 70'; Bavidge 27'; Gethins 90'	BBC Report	Noble 13'	Attendance: 469; Referee: Conroy

5 February 2011 Scottish Second Division	Alloa Athletic	2–3	Dumbarton	Recreation Park
	Motion 64'; Prunty 70'	BBC Report	Walker 35'; McShane 57'; McStay 74'	Attendance: 483; Referee: Smith

12 February 2011 Scottish Second Division	Alloa Athletic	0–3	Forfar Athletic	Recreation Park
		BBC Report	Campbell 61', 80'; Smith 93'	Attendance: 414; Referee: Watters

15 February 2011 Scottish Second Division	Forfar Athletic	1–1	Alloa Athletic	Station Park
	Campbell 71' (pen.)	BBC Report	Lister 81'	Attendance: 390; Referee: Beaton

19 February 2011 Scottish Second Division	Airdrie United	0–2	Alloa Athletic	Excelsior Stadium
	McKeown (red card) 88'	SFL Report	Noble 28'; McGowan 72'	Attendance: 731; Referee: Finnie

26 February 2011 Scottish Second Division	Livingston	4–0	Alloa Athletic	Braidwood Motor Company Stadium
15:00	Russell 55' (pen.); De Vita 56', 77'; Barr 90'	BBC Report		Attendance: 1,377; Referee: Clancy

5 March 2011 Scottish Second Division	Alloa Athletic	1–3	East Fife	Recreation Park
	McGowan 66' (pen.)	BBC Report	Johnstone 34', 45+5'; Philp 45+3' (o.g.)	Attendance: 579; Referee: Northcroft

12 March 2011 Scottish Second Division	Ayr United	1–0	Alloa Athletic	Somerset Park
	McCann 45'	BBC Report		Attendance: 1,049; Referee: Allan

19 March 2011 Scottish Second Division	Alloa Athletic	2–2	Brechin City	Recreation Park
	Walker 22'; Lister 48'	SFL Report	McKenna 9'; Moyes 68'	Attendance: 375; Referee: Smith

26 March 2011 Scottish Second Division	Alloa Athletic	0–0	Peterhead	Recreation Park
		BBC Report		Attendance: 406; Referee: Robertson

29 March 2011 Scottish Second Division	Brechin City	3–2	Alloa Athletic	Glebe Park
	McAllister 4'; Molloy 14'; Janczyk 78'	BBC Report	Lister 40'; McGowan 92' (pen.)	Attendance: 411; Referee: Madden

2 April 2011 Scottish Second Division	Dumbarton	2–2	Alloa Athletic	Strathclyde Homes Stadium
	McLeish 36'; Geggan 49'	BBC Report	McGowan 48', 78'	Attendance: 640; Referee: Hilland

9 April 2011 Scottish Second Division	Alloa Athletic	1–0	Airdrie United	Recreation Park
	McGowan 18'	SFL Report	Smith (red card) 45'	Attendance: 688; Referee: Clancy

16 April 2011 Scottish Second Division	Forfar Athletic	3–1	Alloa Athletic	Station Park
	Fotheringham 23'; Templeman 60'; Dow 62'	BBC Report	Lister 56'	Attendance: 458; Referee: Law

23 April 2011 Scottish Second Division	Alloa Athletic	1–2	Stenhousemuir	Recreation Park
	Walker 20'	BBC Report	Anderson 57'; Paton 61'	Attendance: 584; Referee: Madden

30 April 2011 Scottish Second Division	East Fife	3–1	Alloa Athletic	Bayview Stadium
	Wallace 16'; Park 54'; Durie 87'	BBC Report	Motion 61'	Attendance: 846; Referee: Colvin

7 May 2011 Scottish Second Division	Alloa Athletic	1–3	Livingston	Recreation Park
15:00	Dunlop 53'	BBC Report	Jacobs 43'; De Vita 77'; Russell 87'	Attendance: 647; Referee: Beaton

=== Second Division play-offs ===
11 May 2011 Second Division play-offs SF R1	Annan Athletic	2–1	Alloa Athletic	Galabank
19:45	Muirhead 14'; Steele 60'	BBC Report	Scott 65'	Attendance: 621; Referee: Charleston

14 May 2011 Second Division play-offs SF R2	Alloa Athletic	0–0	Annan Athletic	Recreation Park
15:00		BBC Report		Attendance: 622; Referee: Salmond

=== Scottish Challenge Cup ===
24 July 2010 Challenge Cup round 1	Dundee	2–1	Alloa Athletic	Dens Park
	McMenamin 86'; Higgins 90'	BBC Report	Walker 74'	Attendance: 1,522; Referee: Norris

=== Scottish League Cup ===
1 August 2010 League Cup round 1	East Stirlingshire	1–2	Alloa Athletic	Ochilview Park
	Cawley 17'	BBC Report	Prunty 45+1'; Tully 60' (o.g.)	Attendance: 543; Referee: Madden

24 August 2010 League Cup round 2	Alloa Athletic	0–3	Aberdeen	Recreation Park
19:45		BBC Report	Hartley 18' (pen.); McArdle 38'; Maguire 60'	Attendance: 1,649; Referee: O'Reilly

=== Scottish Cup ===
20 November 2010 Scottish Cup round 3	Alloa Athletic	4–2	Raith Rovers	Recreation Park
	McDonald 41', 42', 66'; Noble 48'	BBC Report	Baird 27'; Dyer (yellow card) 44' (red card); Murray 86'	Attendance: 1,039; Referee: Salmond

8 January 2011 Scottish Cup round 4	Hamilton Academical	2–0	Alloa Athletic	New Douglas Park
	Hasselbaink 33'; Paixao 93'	BBC Report	Robertson (red card) 89'	Attendance: 1,054; Referee: Muir

== League table ==
Pos	Team	Pld	W	D	L	GF	GA	GD	Pts	Promotion, qualification or relegation
6	Airdrie United	36	13	9	14	52	60	−8	48	
7	Dumbarton	36	11	7	18	52	70	−18	40	
8	Stenhousemuir	36	10	8	18	46	59	−13	38	
9	Alloa Athletic (R)	36	9	9	18	49	71	−22	36	Qualification for the Second Division play-offs
10	Peterhead (R)	36	5	11	20	47	76	−29	26	Relegation to the Third Division

Source: SPFL
Rules for classification: 1) points; 2) goal difference; 3) number of goals scored.
(R) Relegated
