= Michael Dunlop (footballer, born 1982) =

Scottish footballer

Personal information
- Date of birth: 5 November 1982 (age 43)
- Place of birth: Glasgow, Scotland
- Position: Defender

Team information
- Current team: Gartcairn (manager)

Senior career*
Years	Team	Apps	(Gls)
2000–2005	Ayr United	76	(2)
2005–2008	Queen's Park	89	(3)
2008–2010	Dumbarton	55	(2)
2010–2011	Alloa Athletic	35	(3)
2011–2012	Brechin City	32	(1)
2012–2013	Stranraer	35	(1)
2013–2017	Albion Rovers	137	(9)
2017–2018	Stenhousemuir	36	(1)
2018–2020	Peterhead	37	(2)
2020	→ Hurlford United (loan)		
2020	Hurlford United		
2021	Rossvale		
2021–2022	Broomhill		

Managerial career
- 2022–2025: Gartcairn
- 2025–: Beith Juniors
- * Club domestic league appearances and goals

Michael Dunlop (born 5 November 1982) is a Scottish footballer who is manager of Gartcairn. Dunlop has previously played for Ayr United, Queen's Park, Dumbarton, Alloa Athletic, Brechin City, Stranraer, Albion Rovers, Stenhousemuir, Peterhead, Hurlford United and Rossvale.

== Career ==
Dunlop, along with his younger brother Ross, signed for Scottish League Two side Stenhousemuir on 22 May 2017. The brothers had played together briefly at Queen's Park before the elder sibling moved on to Dumbarton (where he became captain after the sudden death of Gordon Lennon), then reunited for four seasons at Albion Rovers.

In January 2020, Dunlop signed for Junior side Hurlford United on loan until the end of the season due to work commitments making it difficult to travel to his parent club Peterhead. The move was made permanent that summer, but almost no football was played in that year due to the COVID-19 pandemic in Scotland.

In May 2021, Dunlop signed for West of Scotland Football League side Rossvale as player-assistant manager.

In May 2022 Dunlop was appointed manager of Gartcairn. Dunlop led the club to promotion by winning the West of Scotland First Division in his first season. After a downturn in form in the 2024/25 season following a 15-point deduction, Dunlop subsequently resigned as manager of Gartcairn in March 2025.

In May 2025 Dunlop was appointed manager of Beith Juniors.

He should not be confused with another player of the same name, also a defender but born in 1993, whose clubs included Forfar Athletic, Arbroath and Berwick Rangers.

== Career statistics ==
As of 17 May 2020

Appearances and goals by club, season and competition
Club	Season	League			Scottish Cup		League Cup		Other		Total	
Club	Season	Division	Apps	Goals	Apps	Goals	Apps	Goals	Apps	Goals	Apps	Goals
Ayr United	2001–02	Scottish First Division	1	0	0	0	0	0	0	0	1	0
Ayr United	2002–03	Scottish First Division	24	0	1	0	0	0	1 (Note: Appearances in the Scottish Challenge Cup)	0	26	0
Ayr United	2003–04	Scottish First Division	22	2	1	0	0	0	0	0	23	2
Ayr United	2004–05	Scottish Second Division	28	0	3	0	1	0	0	0	32	0
Ayr United	Total		75	2	5	0	1	0	1	0	82	2
Queen's Park	2005–06	Scottish Third Division	2	0	0	0	0	0	0	0	2	0
Queen's Park	2006–07	Scottish Third Division	32	1	2	0	3	0	4 (Note: One appearance in the Scottish Challenge Cup and three in the Second Division play-offs)	0	41	1
Queen's Park	2007–08	Scottish Second Division	25	0	1	0	2	1	2	0	30	1
Queen's Park	Total		59	1	3	0	5	1	6	0	73	2
Dumbarton	2008–09	Scottish Third Division	21	0	1	0	0	0	0	0	22	0
Dumbarton	2009–10	Scottish Second Division	34	2	0	0	1	0	0	0	35	2
Dumbarton	Total		55	2	1	0	1	0	0	0	57	2
Alloa Athletic	2010–11	Scottish Second Division	33	2	1	0	1	0	2 (Note: Appearances in the Second Division play-offs)	0	37	2
Brechin City	2011–12	Scottish Second Division	32	1	1	0	1	0	1	0	35	1
Stranraer	2012–13	Scottish Second Division	35	1	1	0	1	0	0	0	37	1
Albion Rovers	2013–14	Scottish League Two	32	2	5	0	1	0	1	0	39	2
Albion Rovers	2014–15	Scottish League Two	34	3	4	1	1	0	2	0	41	4
Albion Rovers	2015–16	Scottish League One	36	2	1	0	1	0	1	0	39	2
Albion Rovers	2016–17	Scottish League One	35	2	2	1	4	0	2	1	43	4
Albion Rovers	Total		137	9	12	2	7	0	6	1	162	12
Stenhousemuir	2017–18	Scottish League Two	36	1	2	0	4	0	5	2	47	3
Peterhead	2018–19	Scottish League Two	27	1	3	0	0	0	1	0	31	1
Peterhead	2019–20	Scottish League One	10	1	0	0	2	0	0	0	12	1
Career total			499	21	26	2	23	1	21	3	573	27

== Honours ==
Dumbarton

- Scottish Division Three (fourth tier): 2008–09

Albion Rovers

- Scottish League Two (fourth tier): 2014–15

Peterhead

- Scottish League Two (fourth tier): 2018–19
