= David McEwan =

David McEwan may refer to:

- David McEwan (footballer) (born 1982), Scottish footballer
- David McEwan (producer) (born 1972), Australian/British music producer and musician
