= Patrick Boyle (footballer) =

Scottish footballer (born 1987)

Personal information
- Full name: Patrick Joseph Gerard Boyle
- Date of birth: 20 March 1987 (age 39)
- Place of birth: Glasgow, Scotland
- Position: Left-back

Team information
- Current team: Gartcairn (player/assistant manager)

Youth career
- –2003: Livingston
- 2003–2008: Everton

Senior career*
| Years | Team | Apps | (Gls) |
| 2005–2008 | Everton | 0 | (0) |
| 2006 | → Norwich City (loan) | 3 | (0) |
| 2008 | → Crewe Alexandra (loan) | 17 | (0) |
| 2009 | Dumbarton | 20 | (3) |
| 2009–2011 | Partick Thistle | 50 | (5) |
| 2010 | → Clyde (loan) | 8 | (0) |
| 2011–2013 | Dunfermline Athletic | 22 | (0) |
| 2012–2013 | → Gateshead (loan) | 37 | (0) |
| 2013–2015 | Airdrieonians | 68 | (3) |
| 2015–2018 | Ayr United | 114 | (1) |
| 2018–2020 | Peterhead | 60 | (2) |
| 2020–2021 | Kelty Hearts | 17 | (0) |
| 2021–2022 | Dumbarton | 29 | (1) |

International career
- Scotland U19
- * Club domestic league appearances and goals as of 14:52, 10 June 2022 (UTC)

Patrick Joseph Gerard Boyle (born 20 March 1987) is a Scottish footballer who plays as a left-back. He is player/assistant manager at Gartcairn in the West of Scotland football league after rejecting a new contract at Dumbarton.

Boyle represented Scotland at under-19 level and has previously played for Everton, Norwich City, Crewe Alexandra, Dumbarton, Partick Thistle Clyde, Dunfermline Athletic, Gateshead, Airdrieonians, Ayr United, Peterhead and Kelty Hearts.

== Career ==
=== Everton ===
Born in Glasgow, Boyle signed terms for Everton's academy in 2003, from Scottish side Livingston. He performed well in his first two years for the academy and reserves and in July 2005, the defender was rewarded with a one-year professional contract. Boyle was named on the substitutes bench for a FA Cup fourth round tie against Chelsea in March 2006. In the summer of 2006, he signed a one-year extension to his contract and made his first appearances for the first team in the 2006 pre-season.

Boyle joined Championship side Norwich City on a one-month loan deal and made his début for the club on 16 September against Crystal Palace at Carrow Road. His loan spell at Norwich ended on 17 October, due to Boyle suffering a back injury, which caused him to miss the remainder of the 2006–07 season.

Boyle signed on loan for League One side Crewe Alexandra on 21 January 2008. After impressing in his first month, his loan contract was extended by a further two months. After making a total of 17 appearances for Crewe Alexandra, Boyle returned to Everton. On 14 May 2008, he was, along with many other young players, released by Everton.

=== Career in Scotland ===
After appearing as a trialist in 3 matches, on 31 January 2009, Boyle signed with Scottish Third Division side Dumbarton. In the remainder of the 2008–09 season, he made 17 league appearances for the club, scoring 3 goals. This contribution helped Dumbarton win the Third Division title, and promotion to the Second Division.

Boyle signed for Partick Thistle on 9 July 2009 on a 2-year contract. On 5 March 2010, Boyle joined Clyde on loan for a month, joining Partick teammates Kris Doolan and William Kinniburgh, who were already on loan at Broadwood Stadium. He made 8 appearances in his spell at Clyde, before returning to Partick at the start of April. In Thistle's first home league match of the 2010–11 season, Boyle scored the winning goal in a 1–0 victory over title favourites Dundee at Firhill. On 1 April 2011, Boyle rejected the offer of a new two-year contract from Thistle amidst rumours of interest from Scottish Premier League teams.

Boyle signed a two-year contract with Dunfermline Athletic in June 2011. He made his Pars and SPL début in a home match against Hearts on 15 October 2011, in 2–0 defeat. He made more appearances for Dunfermline after this, covering for the absence of Austin McCann. Dunfermline were relegated from the SPL at the end of the 2011–12 season.

Due to financial difficulties at Dunfermline Boyle signed on loan for Conference National club Gateshead in July 2012. He made his début on 11 August 2012, in a 2–2 draw with Luton Town. On 8 January 2013, Boyle's loan was extended until the end of the season. He signed for Airdrieonians in the summer of 2013, scoring his 1st goal for the club v Ayr Utd on 31 August 2013.

At the end of the 2014–15 season, Boyle left Airdrieonians and signed a two-year deal with Ayr United. Boyle helped Ayr to promotions in 2015–16 and 2017–18, but was released at the end of the latter season. During the 2018 close season, Boyle signed for Peterhead.

Kelty Hearts announced the signing of Boyle on 31 July 2020.

Boyle re-joined Dumbarton on 3 June 2021 scoring his first goal in 12 years for the club in a 1–1 draw with Alloa Athletic in September 2021. He left the Sons following their relegation to Scottish League Two in May 2022, turning down a new deal and a coaching role.

== Career statistics ==
As of 07:36, 4 May 2022 (UTC)

| Club | Season | League | League^{[A]} | | FA Cup | | League Cup | | Other^{[B]} | | Total | |
| Club | Season | League | Apps | Goals | Apps | Goals | Apps | Goals | Apps | Goals | Apps | Goals |
|---|---|---|---|---|---|---|---|---|---|---|---|---|
| Everton | 2005–06 | Premier League | 0 | 0 | 0 | 0 | 0 | 0 | 0 | 0 | 0 | 0 |
| Everton | 2006–07 | Premier League | 0 | 0 | 0 | 0 | 0 | 0 | 0 | 0 | 0 | 0 |
| Everton | 2007–08 | Premier League | 0 | 0 | 0 | 0 | 0 | 0 | 0 | 0 | 0 | 0 |
| Everton | Total | | 0 | 0 | 0 | 0 | 0 | 0 | 0 | 0 | 0 | 0 |
| Norwich City (loan) | 2006–07 | Championship | 3 | 0 | 0 | 0 | 0 | 0 | 0 | 0 | 3 | 0 |
| Crewe Alexandra (loan) | 2007–08 | League One | 17 | 0 | 0 | 0 | 0 | 0 | 0 | 0 | 17 | 0 |
| Dumbarton | 2008–09 | Scottish Third Division | 20 | 3 | 0 | 0 | 0 | 0 | 0 | 0 | 20 | 3 |
| Partick Thistle | 2009–10 | Scottish First Division | 6 | 0 | 0 | 0 | 1 | 0 | 3 | 0 | 10 | 0 |
| Partick Thistle | 2010–11 | Scottish First Division | 35 | 4 | 4 | 0 | 2 | 0 | 4 | 1 | 45 | 5 |
| Partick Thistle | Total | | 41 | 4 | 4 | 0 | 3 | 0 | 7 | 1 | 55 | 5 |
| Clyde (loan) | 2009–10 | Scottish Second Division | 8 | 0 | 0 | 0 | 0 | 0 | 0 | 0 | 8 | 0 |
| Dunfermline Athletic | 2011–12 | Scottish Premier League | 21 | 0 | 2 | 0 | 0 | 0 | 0 | 0 | 23 | 0 |
| Dunfermline Athletic | 2012–13 | Scottish First Division | 0 | 0 | 0 | 0 | 0 | 0 | 0 | 0 | 0 | 0 |
| Dunfermline Athletic | Total | | 21 | 0 | 2 | 0 | 0 | 0 | 0 | 0 | 23 | 0 |
| Gateshead (loan) | 2012–13 | Conference National | 37 | 0 | 0 | 0 | 0 | 0 | 3 | 0 | 40 | 0 |
| Gateshead (loan) | Total | | 37 | 0 | 0 | 0 | 0 | 0 | 3 | 0 | 40 | 0 |
| Airdrieonians | 2013–14 | Scottish League One | 29 | 1 | 1 | 0 | 1 | 0 | 0 | 0 | 31 | 1 |
| Airdrieonians | 2014–15 | Scottish League One | 27 | 2 | 2 | 0 | 1 | 0 | 1 | 0 | 31 | 2 |
| Airdrieonians | Total | | 56 | 3 | 3 | 0 | 2 | 0 | 1 | 0 | 62 | 3 |
| Ayr United | 2015–16 | Scottish League One | 28 | 0 | 1 | 0 | 2 | 1 | 6 | 0 | 37 | 1 |
| Ayr United | 2016–17 | Scottish Championship | 29 | 0 | 5 | 0 | 5 | 0 | 2 | 0 | 41 | 0 |
| Ayr United | 2017–18 | Scottish League One | 27 | 1 | 3 | 0 | 5 | 0 | 1 | 0 | 36 | 1 |
| Ayr United | Total | | 84 | 1 | 9 | 0 | 12 | 1 | 9 | 0 | 114 | 2 |
| Peterhead | 2018–19 | Scottish League Two | 28 | 1 | 2 | 0 | 0 | 0 | 0 | 0 | 30 | 1 |
| Peterhead | 2019–20 | Scottish League One | 25 | 0 | 1 | 0 | 4 | 0 | 0 | 0 | 30 | 0 |
| Peterhead | Total | | 53 | 1 | 3 | 0 | 4 | 0 | 0 | 0 | 60 | 1 |
| Dumbarton | 2021–22 | Scottish League One | 28 | 1 | 2 | 0 | 0 | 0 | 2 | 0 | 32 | 1 |
| Career totals | | | 368 | 13 | 23 | 0 | 21 | 1 | 22 | 1 | 434 | 15 |

A. The "League" column constitutes appearances and goals (including those as a substitute) in The Football League, Scottish Premier League, Scottish Football League and Football Conference.
B. The "Other" column constitutes appearances and goals (including those as a substitute) in the Scottish Football League Promotion / Relegation Play-offs, Scottish Challenge Cup and FA Trophy.

== Honours ==
Dumbarton

- Scottish Third Division:
  - Winner (1): 2008–09

Peterhead

- Scottish League Two :
  - Winner (1): 2018–19
