= Jamie McKenzie (footballer, born 1980) =

Scottish footballer and manager

Personal information
- Date of birth: 29 November 1980 (age 45)
- Place of birth: Bellshill, Scotland
- Position: Midfielder

Team information
- Current team: Cambuslang Rangers (first team coach)

Youth career
- Partick Thistle B.C.

Senior career*
Years	Team	Apps	(Gls)
1996–1999	Partick Thistle	25	(1)
1998–1999	→ Cowdenbeath (loan)	15	(0)
1999–2002	Albion Rovers	48	(4)
2002–2004	Stenhousemuir	43	(15)
2003–2006	Elgin City	72	(6)
2006	Bellshill Athletic (Loan)		
2006-2007	Albion Rovers	35	(4)
2007-2009	Cumnock Juniors (player-coach)		
2009	Montrose	10	(2)
2009-2010	Fauldhouse United		
2010-2011	Vale of Clyde (player-coach)	13	(1)
2011-2013	Forth Wanderers		
Total		225	(22)

Managerial career
- 2005–2006: Elgin City
- 2011–2014: Forth Wanderers (assistant)
- 2014-2018: Forth Wanderers
- 2018–2020: Gartcairn Juniors
- * Club domestic league appearances and goals

Jamie McKenzie (born 29 November 1980 in Bellshill) is a Scottish former professional footballer. He played for Partick Thistle, Cowdenbeath, Albion Rovers, Stenhousemuir, Elgin City and Montrose in the Scottish Football League.

McKenzie also served as caretaker manager of Elgin City during the 2005–06 season at the age of 25. After moving into Junior football, McKenzie managed West Region side Gartcairn.

On 17 December 2019, McKenzie left Gartcairn.
