= Gartcairn F. A. Juniors =

Association football club in Scotland

Gartcairn Juniors
- Full name: Gartcairn Football Academy Juniors
- Nickname: The Cairn
- Founded: 2007 (Gartcairn Football Academy); 2015 (Gartcairn FA Juniors)
- Ground: MTC Park, Airdrie
- Coordinates: 55°52′17″N 3°57′51″W
- Chairman: Martin Peacock
- Manager: Ryan McStay and Darren Barr
- League: West of Scotland League First Division
- 2025–26: West of Scotland League First Division, 15th of 16
Home colours	Away colours

Gartcairn Football Academy Juniors, commonly referred to as Gartcairn Juniors, are a Scottish semi-professional football club from the town of Airdrie, North Lanarkshire who play in the West of Scotland League First Division.

== History ==
The Gartcairn Football Academy was founded in 2007 with two teams at under-8 and under-10 level. Since that time, the club grew to involve 700 players and 60 coaches with teams from the youngest age groups up to an adult amateur side. Gartcairn decided to apply for membership of the Scottish Junior Football Association in 2015, to create an unbroken player pathway to semi-professional level and to provide a playing option for existing local talent in Airdrie and neighbouring Coatbridge. Airdrie had previously had no representation at Junior level since the 1930s.

The academy officially opened their own facility at St Margaret's High School in Airdrie in January 2014, however the Junior side initially had to play out of Coatbridge Outdoor Sports Centre due to certain ground criteria not being met. The club were able to use to their own ground, named MTC Park, from January 2016 after alterations were made.

Willie Kinniburgh was appointed manager of the first team in December 2019. The club attracted former Hibernian player Tam McManus out of retirement for their debut Junior season. The club did the same with recently retired former Dundee and Partick Thistle player Gary Harkins in 2020.

Entering the SJFA West Region's bottom tier, Central District Division Two, the club finished 2nd in 2017–18 and gained promotion. The following season, they became champions of West League One to gain promotion to the second tier of the West Region structure.

After the move to the West of Scotland Football League in 2020, the club consolidated their position in the Conferences and then won the First Division title in 2022–23 to gain promotion to the Premier Division.

== Honours ==
West of Scotland Football League

- First Division winners: 2022–23

SJFA West Region

- League One winners: 2018–19

== Managers ==
- Billy McKie (Jun 2015 – Aug 2015)
- Gary Johnstone (Aug 2015 – Mar 2016)
- Gerry Bonham (Mar 2016 – Dec 2016)
- David Greig (Dec 2016 – May 2018)
- Jamie McKenzie (May 2018 – December 2019)
- Willie Kinniburgh (December 2019 – April 2022)
- Michael Dunlop (May 2022 – March 2025)
- Ryan McStay and Darren Barr (March 2025 — Present)
