= Mark McLennan =

Scottish footballer

Personal information
- Date of birth: 28 April 1991 (age 35)
- Position: Right back

Team information
- Current team: Irvine Meadow

Senior career*
Years	Team	Apps	(Gls)
2010–2011	St Mirren	1	(0)
2010	→ Stenhousemuir (loan)	2	(0)
2011–2013	Irvine Meadow		
2013–2014	Pollok		
2014–2015	Irvine Meadow		
2015–2016	Pollok		
2016–	Irvine Meadow		
- * Club domestic league appearances and goals as of 10:03, 24 August 2016 (UTC)

Mark McLennan (born 28 April 1991) is a Scottish professional footballer who plays as a right back for Irvine Meadow in the Scottish Junior Football Association, West Region. He has previously played in the Scottish Premier League for St Mirren.

== Career ==
McLennan began his career with St Mirren, where he also spent a loan spell at Stenhousemuir. On 13 May 2011, McLennan was informed he would not be offered a new contract at St Mirren, and would leave the club at the end of the 2010–11 season.

He spent two seasons with Irvine Meadow before signing for Pollok in June 2013. McLennan returned to Meadow for a second spell in June 2014, before returning to Pollok in February 2015. McLennan retraced his steps yet again to sign with Irvine Meadow for a third time in July 2016.
