= Alan Cook (footballer) =

Scottish footballer (born 1992)

Personal information
- Date of birth: 25 April 1992 (age 34)
- Position: Midfielder

Team information
- Current team: Open Goal Broomhill

Senior career*
Years	Team	Apps	(Gls)
2009–2011	Dumbarton	19	(4)
2011–2012	Stirling Albion	33	(8)
2012–2013	Airdrie United	11	(2)
2013–2014	Arbroath	35	(12)
2014–2015	East Fife	24	(2)
2015–2017	Stenhousemuir	61	(13)
2017–2018	Alloa Athletic	9	(0)
2017–2018	→ Stenhousemuir (loan)	23	(2)
2018–2020	Stenhousemuir	48	(6)
2020	→ Peterhead (loan)	5	(1)
2020–2022	Peterhead	20	(0)
2022	Annan Athletic	0	(0)
2022-	Open Goal Broomhill		
- * Club domestic league appearances and goals as of 20:59, 5 October 2022 (UTC)

Alan Cook (born 25 April 1992) is a Scottish footballer who plays for Open Goal Broomhill as a midfielder.

== Career ==
Cook has previously played for Dumbarton, Stirling Albion, Airdrie United, Arbroath, East Fife, Alloa Athletic, as well as Stenhousemuir on loan.

In January 2020, he moved to Peterhead. After playing for Annan Athletic, he signed for Open Goal Broomhill for the 2022–23 season.

== Career statistics ==
As of 25 May 2018

Appearances and goals by club, season and competition
Club	Season	League			Scottish Cup		League Cup		Other		Total	
Club	Season	Division	Apps	Goals	Apps	Goals	Apps	Goals	Apps	Goals	Apps	Goals
Dumbarton	2009–10	Scottish Second Division	10	3	0	0	0	0	0	0	10	3
Dumbarton	2010–11	Scottish Second Division	9	1	0	0	0	0	0	0	9	1
Dumbarton	Total		19	4	0	0	0	0	0	0	19	4
Stirling Albion	2011–12	Scottish Second Division	33	8	0	0	1	0	1 (Note: Appearances in the Scottish Challenge Cup)	0	35	8
Airdrie United	2012–13	Scottish First Division	11	2	0	0	1	1	1	0	13	3
Arbroath	2013–14	Scottish League One	35	12	1	0	1	0	1	0	38	12
East Fife	2014–15	Scottish League Two	24	2	0	0	1	0	4 (Note: Two appearances in the Scottish Challenge Cup and two in the League One play-offs)	0	29	2
Stenhousemuir	2015–16	Scottish League One	31	8	2	0	1	0	3	1	37	9
Stenhousemuir	2016–17	Scottish League One	30	5	2	0	4	0	2	2	38	7
Stenhousemuir	Total		61	13	4	0	5	0	5	3	75	16
Alloa Athletic	2017–18	Scottish League One	9	0	1	0	3	0	2	0	15	0
Stenhousemuir (loan)	2017–18	Scottish League Two	23	2	0	0	0	0	4 (Note: Four appearances in the League One play-offs)	0	27	2
Stenhousemuir	2018–19	Scottish League One	0	0	0	0	0	0	0	0	0	0
Stenhousemuir	Total		23	2	0	0	0	0	4	0	27	2
Career total			191	41	6	0	12	1	18	3	227	45
