= Willie Lyle =

Scottish footballer

Personal information
- Full name: William Lyle
- Date of birth: 14 April 1984 (age 42)
- Place of birth: Irvine, Scotland
- Position: Full-back

Team information
- Current team: Kilbirnie Ladeside (assistant manager)

Youth career
- –2000: Auchinleck Talbot BC

Senior career*
Years	Team	Apps	(Gls)
2000–2005	Ayr United	98	(1)
2005–2006	Raith Rovers	30	(0)
2006–2007	Stranraer	18	(0)
2007–2012	Stenhousemuir	150	(4)
2012–2022	Auchinleck Talbot	?	(?)
2022–2023	Irvine Meadow XI	?	(?)
- * Club domestic league appearances and goals as of 17 May 2023

William Lyle (born 14 April 1984) is a Scottish footballer who plays for Auchinleck Talbot.

== Playing career ==
A right sided full-back, Lyle joined Ayr United from school in July 2000 and made his first-team debut against Falkirk in August 2002. The player later had a season each at Raith Rovers and Stranraer before signing for Stenhousemuir in July 2007. Lyle remained at Ochilview Park for five seasons, eventually becoming club captain. After his release in 2012, he joined Junior side Auchinleck Talbot with whom he had played at boys club level, years previously.

Lyle signed on with Talbot for another season in June 2013.

After 10 years with Auchinleck, Lyle signed for Irvine Meadow in early 2022.

=== International ===
Lyle was called up to the Scotland Junior international squad in October 2012 for their fixture against the Republic of Ireland.

== Coaching ==
After retiring as a player, Lyle was appointed assistant manager of Kilbirnie Ladeside, alongside his former Meadow boss Colin Spence, in May 2023.
