= 2008–09 Scottish Football League =

Scottish football season

Statistics of the Scottish Football League in season 2008–09.

== Scottish First Division ==
Pos	Team	Pld	W	D	L	GF	GA	GD	Pts	Promotion, qualification or relegation
1	St Johnstone (C, P)	36	17	14	5	55	35	+20	65	Promotion to the Premier League
2	Partick Thistle	36	16	7	13	39	35	+4	55	
3	Dunfermline Athletic	36	14	9	13	51	43	+8	51	
4	Dundee	36	13	11	12	33	32	+1	50	
5	Queen of the South	36	12	11	13	57	50	+7	47	
6	Greenock Morton	36	12	11	13	40	40	0	47	
7	Livingston (R)	36	13	8	15	56	58	−2	47 (Note: Demoted to 3rd Division for Financial Irregularities)	
8	Ross County	36	13	8	15	42	46	−4	47	
9	Airdrie United	36	10	12	14	29	43	−14	42 (Note: Spared Relegation as Losing Finalist in the playoff due to Livingston)	Qualification for the First Division Play-offs (Note: The 9th placed team will be entered into a play-off with the Second Division's 2nd, 3rd and 4th placed teams. The winning team will be awarded a place in the 2009–10 First Division.)
10	Clyde (R)	36	10	9	17	41	58	−17	39	Relegation to the Second Division

Source: BBC Sport
Rules for classification: 1) points; 2) goal difference; 3) number of goals scored.
(C) Champions; (P) Promoted; (R) Relegated

== Scottish Second Division ==
Pos	Team	Pld	W	D	L	GF	GA	GD	Pts	Promotion, qualification or relegation
1	Raith Rovers (C, P)	36	22	10	4	60	27	+33	76	Promotion to the First Division
2	Ayr United (P)	36	22	8	6	71	38	+33	74	Qualification for the First Division Play-offs (Note: The 2nd, 3rd and 4th placed teams will be entered into a play-off with the First Division's 9th placed team. The winning team will be awarded a place in the 2009–10 First Division)
3	Brechin City	36	18	8	10	51	45	+6	62	Qualification for the First Division Play-offs
4	Peterhead	36	15	11	10	54	39	+15	56	Qualification for the First Division Play-offs
5	Stirling Albion	36	14	11	11	59	49	+10	53	
6	East Fife	36	13	5	18	39	44	−5	44	
7	Arbroath	36	11	8	17	44	46	−2	41	
8	Alloa Athletic	36	11	8	17	47	59	−12	41	
9	Queen's Park (R)	36	7	12	17	35	54	−19	33	Qualification for the Second Division Play-offs (Note: The 9th placed team will be entered into a play-off with the Third Division's 2nd, 3rd and 4th placed teams. The winning team will be awarded a place in the 2009–10 Second Division.)
10	Stranraer (R)	36	3	7	26	31	90	−59	16	Relegation to the Second Third Division

Source: BBC Sport
Rules for classification: 1) points; 2) goal difference; 3) number of goals scored.
(C) Champions; (P) Promoted; (R) Relegated

== Scottish Third Division ==
Pos	Team	Pld	W	D	L	GF	GA	GD	Pts	Promotion or qualification
1	Dumbarton (C, P)	36	19	10	7	65	36	+29	67	Promotion to the Second Division
2	Cowdenbeath (P)	36	18	9	9	48	34	+14	63 (Note: Cowdenbeath were promoted due to Livingston's demotion from the First Division to the Third.)	Qualification for the Second Division Play-offs (Note: The 2nd, 3rd and 4th placed teams will be entered into a play-off with the Second Division's 9th placed team. The winning team will be awarded a place in the 2009–10 Second Division.)
3	East Stirlingshire	36	19	4	13	57	50	+7	61	Qualification for the Second Division Play-offs
4	Stenhousemuir (O, P)	36	16	8	12	55	46	+9	56	Qualification for the Second Division Play-offs
5	Montrose	36	16	6	14	47	48	−1	54	
6	Forfar Athletic	36	14	9	13	53	51	+2	51	
7	Annan Athletic	36	14	8	14	56	45	+11	50	
8	Albion Rovers	36	11	6	19	39	47	−8	39	
9	Berwick Rangers	36	10	7	19	46	61	−15	37	
10	Elgin City	36	7	5	24	31	79	−48	26	

Source: BBC Sport
Rules for classification: 1) points; 2) goal difference; 3) number of goals scored.
(C) Champions; (O) Play-off winners; (P) Promoted

== See also ==
- 2008–09 in Scottish football
