= 2009–10 Scottish Football League =

Irn-Bru Football League
- Season: 2009–10

Statistics of the Scottish Football League in season 2009–10.

== Scottish First Division ==
Pos	Team	Pld	W	D	L	GF	GA	GD	Pts	Promotion, qualification or relegation
1	Inverness Caledonian Thistle (C, P)	36	21	10	5	72	32	+40	73	Promotion to the Premier League
2	Dundee	36	16	13	7	48	34	+14	61	
3	Dunfermline Athletic	36	17	7	12	54	44	+10	58	
4	Queen of the South	36	15	11	10	53	40	+13	56	
5	Ross County	36	15	11	10	46	44	+2	56	
6	Partick Thistle	36	14	6	16	43	40	+3	48	
7	Raith Rovers	36	11	9	16	36	47	−11	42	
8	Greenock Morton	36	11	4	21	40	65	−25	37	
9	Airdrie United (R)	36	8	9	19	41	56	−15	33	Qualification to the First Division play-offs
10	Ayr United (R)	36	7	10	19	29	60	−31	31	Relegation to the Second Division

Source: Scottish Football League
Rules for classification: 1) points; 2) goal difference; 3) number of goals scored.
First Division play-offs: The 9th place team will be entered into a play-off with the 2nd, 3rd and 4th places of the Second Division. The winner gets a place in the 2010-11 First Division
(C) Champions; (P) Promoted; (R) Relegated

Playoffs

Semifinals
Brechin City	2	1	3
Airdrie United	1	0	1
Cowdenbeath	1	2	3
Alloa Athletic	1	0	1
3
6
2
7

Final
Brechin City	0	0	0
Cowdenbeath	0	3	3

Finals

== Scottish Second Division ==
Pos	Team	Pld	W	D	L	GF	GA	GD	Pts	Promotion, qualification or relegation
1	Stirling Albion (C, P)	36	18	11	7	68	48	+20	65	Promotion to the First Division
2	Alloa Athletic	36	19	8	9	49	35	+14	65	Qualification for the First Division play-offs (Note: The 2nd, 3rd and 4th placed teams will be entered into a play-off with the First Division's 9th placed team. The winning team will be awarded a place in the 2010–11 First Division.)
3	Cowdenbeath (O, P)	36	16	11	9	60	41	+19	59	Qualification for the First Division play-offs
4	Brechin City	36	15	9	12	47	42	+5	54	Qualification for the First Division play-offs
5	Peterhead	36	15	6	15	45	49	−4	51	
6	Dumbarton	36	14	6	16	49	58	−9	48	
7	East Fife	36	10	11	15	46	53	−7	41	
8	Stenhousemuir	36	9	13	14	38	42	−4	40	
9	Arbroath (R)	36	10	10	16	41	55	−14	40	Qualification for the Second Division play-offs (Note: The 9th place team will be entered into a play-off with the 2nd, 3rd and 4th places of the Third Division. The winner gets a place in the 2010-11 Second Division)
10	Clyde (R)	36	8	7	21	37	57	−20	31	Relegation to the Third Division

Source: Scottish Football League
Rules for classification: 1) points; 2) goal difference; 3) number of goals scored.
(C) Champions; (O) Play-off winners; (P) Promoted; (R) Relegated
Notes:

Play-Offs

Team 1	Agg.	Team 2	1st leg	2nd leg
Queen's Park	2–6	Arbroath	0–4	2–2
East Stirlingshire	2–3	Forfar Athletic	0–1	2–2

Team 1	Agg.	Team 2	1st leg	2nd leg
Arbroath	0–2	Forfar Athletic	0–0	0–2

== Scottish Third Division ==
Pos	Team	Pld	W	D	L	GF	GA	GD	Pts	Promotion or qualification
1	Livingston (C, P)	36	24	6	6	63	25	+38	78	Promotion to the Second Division
2	Forfar Athletic (P, O)	36	18	9	9	59	44	+15	63	Qualification for the Second Division Play-offs (Note: The 2nd, 3rd and 4th placed teams will be entered into a play-off with the Second Division's 9th placed team. The winning team will be awarded a place in the 2010–11 Second Division.)
3	East Stirlingshire	36	19	4	13	50	46	+4	61	Qualification for the Second Division Play-offs
4	Queen's Park	36	15	6	15	42	42	0	51	Qualification for the Second Division Play-offs
5	Albion Rovers	36	13	11	12	35	35	0	50	
6	Berwick Rangers	36	14	8	14	46	50	−4	50	
7	Stranraer	36	13	8	15	48	54	−6	47	
8	Annan Athletic	36	11	10	15	41	42	−1	43	
9	Elgin City	36	9	7	20	46	59	−13	34	
10	Montrose	36	5	9	22	30	63	−33	24	

Source: Scottish Football League
Rules for classification: 1) points; 2) goal difference; 3) number of goals scored.
(C) Champions; (O) Play-off winners; (P) Promoted

== See also ==
- 2009–10 in Scottish football
