= Iain Chisholm =

Scottish footballer

Personal information
- Full name: Iain Chisholm
- Date of birth: 29 August 1985 (age 41)
- Place of birth: Glasgow, Scotland
- Position: Utility player

Youth career
- Tower Hearts

Senior career*
Years	Team	Apps	(Gls)
2005–2008	Albion Rovers	78	(7)
2008–2011	Dumbarton	74	(3)
2011–2012	East Stirling	20	(0)
2013–2015	Annan Athletic	54	(1)
2016–	Shettleston		
- * Club domestic league appearances and goals

Iain Chisholm (born 29 August 1985) is a Scottish footballer who played 'senior' for Albion Rovers, Dumbarton and East Stirling.

== Honours ==
Dumbarton

- Scottish Division Three (fourth tier): Winners 2008–09
