= Denis McLaughlin =

Irish footballer

Personal information
- Date of birth: 5 February 1987 (age 39)
- Place of birth: Letterkenny, Ireland
- Height: 6 ft 1 in (1.85 m)
- Position: Striker

Youth career
- 2004–2006: Heart of Midlothian

Senior career*
Years	Team	Apps	(Gls)
2006–2009	Heart of Midlothian	0	(0)
2006	→ Berwick Rangers (loan)	10	(2)
2007	→ Raith Rovers (loan)	16	(2)
2007	→ Gimnástica (loan)		
2009	→ Dumbarton (loan)	16	(6)
2009–2010	Dumbarton	14	(1)
2010	Albion Rovers	8	(0)
2010	Arthurlie		
- * Club domestic league appearances and goals as of 3 June 2011

Denis McLaughlin (born 5 February 1987) is an Irish professional association football player who plays for Muirton AFC as a striker.

He transferred from Berwick Rangers to Hearts, and then from Hearts to Torrelavege. He has also played for Cowdenbeath, Raith Rovers and the Spanish club Gimnástica.

== Career ==
McLaughlin started his career with Hearts, but was loaned to Berwick Rangers for the first half of the 2006–07 season in order to gain more competitive experience. He rejected the chance to extend this loan in January, instead opting to move to Raith Rovers on loan, where former coach at Hearts John McGlynn had recently been appointed manager. He joined Gimnástica on a 6-month loan deal in August 2007.

After being released by Hearts in the summer of 2009, McLaughlin signed for Second Division side Dumbarton on 30 August but moved on to Albion Rovers in February 2010. He was released at the end of the 2009–10 season and currently plays for Muirton AFC.

== Honours ==
Dumbarton

- Scottish Division Three (fourth tier): Winners 2008–09
