= Raymond Logan =

Scottish footballer

Personal information
- Date of birth: 20 September 1978 (age 48)
- Place of birth: Bellshill, Scotland
- Position: Midfielder

Senior career*
Years	Team	Apps	(Gls)
1999–2000	East Fife	77	(17)
2000-2001	Linlithgow Rose		
2005–2008	Ayr United	92	(22)
2008–2010	Dumbarton	37	(19)
- * Club domestic league appearances and goals

Raymond Logan (born 20 September 1978) is a Scottish footballer who played for East Fife, Ayr United and Dumbarton.

Logan had a spell at Linlithgow Rose in 2000-2001.
