= 2002–03 Ayr United F.C. season =

Ayr United
2002–03 season
- Manager: Campbell Money
- Stadium: Somerset Park
- Scottish First Division: Sixth Place
- Scottish Cup: Fourth round, lost to Rangers
- League Cup: Second round, lost to Falkirk
- Scottish Challenge Cup: Second round, lost to Dumbarton
Home colours	Away colours

The 2002–03 season is the 93rd season of competitive football by Ayr United.

== Competitions ==
Win Draw Loss

=== Preseason ===
17 July 2002 Friendly	Dungannon Swifts	2–4	Ayr United	Stangmore Park, Dungannon

18 July 2002 Friendly	Glenavon	2–3	Ayr United	Mourneview Park, Lurgan

20 July 2002 Friendly	Glenatoran	1–0	Ayr United	The Oval, Belfast

23 July 2002 Friendly	Ayr United	1–3	Cardiff City	Somerset Park, Ayr

25 July 2002 Friendly	Ayr United	1–2	Wycombe Wanderers	Somerset Park, Ayr

27 July 2002 Friendly	Ayr United	2–4	Stranraer	Somerset Park, Ayr

30 July 2002 Friendly	Kilwinning Rangers	2–0	Ayr United	Abbey Park, Kilwinning

Last updated: 25 May 2003.
Source: ayr-united.co.uk

=== Scottish First Division ===
==== Matches ====
3 August 2002 match 1	Ayr United	1–3	Falkirk	Somerset Park, Ayr
15:00				Attendance: 3,030

10 August 2002 match 2	Clyde	1–0	Ayr United	Broadwood Stadium, Cumbernauld
15:00				Attendance: 1,077

17 August 2002 match 3	Ayr United	2–1	Ross County	Somerset Park, Ayr
15:00				Attendance: 1,692

24 August 2002 match 4	Queen of the South	1–2	Ayr United	Palmerston Park, Dumfries
15:00				Attendance: 2,803

31 August 2002 match 5	Ayr United	1–0	Arbroath	Somerset Park, Ayr
15:00				Attendance: 1,732

14 September 2002 match 6	Ayr United	0–0	St Johnstone	Somerset Park, Ayr
15:00				Attendance: 2,320

21 September 2002 match 7	Alloa Athletic	0–1	Ayr United	Recreation Park, Alloa
15:00				Attendance: 619

28 September 2002 match 8	Ayr United	1–1	St Mirren	Somerset Park, Ayr
15:00				Attendance: 2,489

5 October 2002 match 9	Inverness CT	2–0	Ayr United	Caledonian Stadium, Inverness
15:00				Attendance: 1,803

19 October 2002 match 10	Falkirk	3–0	Ayr United	Brockville Park, Falkirk
15:00				Attendance: 3,441

26 October 2002 match 11	Ayr United	1–1	Clyde	Somerset Park, Ayr
15:00				Attendance: 1,989

5 November 2002 match 12	Arbroath	1–1	Ayr United	Gayfield Park, Arbroath
15:00

9 November 2002 match 13	Ayr United	0–1	Queen of the South	Somerset Park, Ayr
15:00				Attendance: 2,234

16 November 2002 match 14	St Johnstone	0–2	Ayr United	McDiarmid Park, Perth
15:00				Attendance: 2,003

23 November 2002 match 15	Ayr United	3–1	Alloa Athletic	Somerset Park, Ayr
15:00				Attendance: 1,632

30 November 2002 match 16	St Mirren	1–0	Ayr United	Love Street, Paisley
15:00				Attendance: 1,638

7 December 2002 match 17	Ayr United	3–3	Inverness CT	Somerset Park, Ayr
15:00				Attendance: 1,663

14 December match 18	Ross County	1–0	Ayr United	Victoria Park, Dingwall
15:00				Attendance: 2,352

28 December 2002 match 19	Ayr United	4–0	Arbroath	Somerset Park, Ayr
15:00

1 January 2003 match 20	Queen of the South	1–1	Ayr United	Palmerston Park, Dumfries
15:00

18 January 2003 match 21	Inverness CT	0–1	Ayr United	Caledonian Stadium, Inverness
15:00

1 February 2003 match 22	Ayr United	0–0	St Mirren	Somerset Park, Ayr
15:00				Attendance: 2,738

8 February 2003 match 23	Ayr United	1–1	Ross County	Somerset Park, Ayr
15:00				Attendance: 1,486

25 February 2003 match 24	Ayr United	1–0	Falkirk	Somerset Park, Ayr
15:00

1 March 2003 match 25	Arbroath	1–2	Ayr United	Gayfield Park, Arbroath
				Attendance: 505

4 March 2003 match 26	Ayr United	0–1	St Johnstone	Somerset Park, Ayr

8 March 2003 match 27	Ayr United	0–1	Queen of the South	Somerset Park, Ayr
				Attendance: 1,730

15 March 2003 match 28	Ayr United	0–1	Alloa Athletic	Somerset Park, Ayr
				Attendance: 1,363

22 March 2003 match 29	Clyde	3–0	Ayr United	Broadwood Stadium, Cumbernauld
				Attendance: 1,015

25 March match 30	Alloa Athletic	2–3	Ayr United	Recreation Park, Alloa
				Attendance: 454

5 April 2003 match 31	St Johnstone	1–0	Ayr United	McDiarmid Park, Perth
15:00				Attendance: 2,132

12 April 2003 match 32	St Mirren	1–1	Ayr United	Love Street, Paisley
15:00				Attendance: 2,248

26 April 2003 match 33	Falkirk	3–0	Ayr United	Brockville Park, Falkirk
15:00				Attendance: 4,042

29 April 2003 match 34	Ayr United	1–0	Inverness CT	Somerset Park, Ayr
15:00				Attendance: 1,114

3 May 2003 match 35	Ayr United	0–3	Clyde	Somerset Park, Ayr
15:00				Attendance: 1,795

10 May 2003 match 36	Ross County	4–1	Ayr United	Victoria Park, Dingwall
15:00				Attendance: 3,449

Last updated: 25 May 2003.
Source: Statto.com

=== Scottish Challenge Cup ===
5 August 2002 Round 1	Stranraer	1–2	Ayr United	Stair Park, Stranraer

13 August 2002 Round 2	Dumbarton	3–0	Ayr United	Strathclyde Homes Stadium, Dumbarton

Last updated: 25 May 2003.
Source: Statto.com

=== Scottish League Cup ===
24 September 2002 Round 2	Ayr United	0–2	Falkirk	Somerset Park, Ayr

Last updated: 25 May 2003.
Source: Statto.com

=== Scottish Cup ===
25 January 2003 Round 3	Ayr United	2–0	Peterhead	Somerset Park, Ayr

22 February 2003 Round 4	Ayr United	0–1	Rangers	Somerset Park, Ayr

Last updated: 25 May 2003.
Source: Statto.com

== Statistics ==
=== League table ===
Pos	Team	Pld	W	D	L	GF	GA	GD	Pts
4	Inverness CT	36	20	5	11	74	45	+29	65
5	Queen of the South	36	12	12	12	45	48	−3	48
6	Ayr United	36	12	9	15	34	44	−10	45
7	St Mirren	36	9	10	17	42	71	−29	37
8	Ross County	36	9	8	19	42	46	−4	35

Source: "2002-2003 First Division - SPFL Archive". SPFL.
Rules for classification: 1) points; 2) goal difference; 3) number of goals scored.

=== Results summary ===
Overall								Home						Away					
Pld	W	D	L	GF	GA	GD	Pts	W	D	L	GF	GA	GD	W	D	L	GF	GA	GD
36	12	9	15	34	44	−10	45	6	6	6	19	18	+1	6	3	9	15	26	−11

Last updated: 25 May 2003.
Source: Wikipedia article

=== Results by round ===
Round	1	2	3	4	5	6	7	8	9	10	11	12	13	14	15	16	17	18	19	20	21	22	23	24	25	26	27	28	29	30	31	32	33	34	35	36
Ground	H	A	H	A	H	H	A	H	A	A	H	A	H	A	H	A	H	A	H	A	A	H	H	H	A	H	H	H	A	A	A	A	A	H	H	A
Result	L	L	W	W	W	D	W	D	L	L	D	D	L	W	W	L	D	L	W	D	W	D	D	W	W	L	L	L	L	W	L	D	L	W	L	L
Position	8	9	7	5	3	4	4	3	4	5	5	5	5	5	5	5	5	6	5	5	5	5	5	5	5	5	5	5	6	5	5	5	6	5	6	6

Source: Statto.com
A = Away; H = Home; W = Win; D = Draw; L = Loss
