= Mark McGeown =

Scottish footballer

Personal information
- Full name: Mark McGeown
- Date of birth: 10 May 1970 (age 56)
- Place of birth: Paisley, Scotland
- Height: 1.80 m (5 ft 11 in)
- Position: Goalkeeper

Youth career
- 1987-1988: Celtic

Senior career*
Years	Team	Apps	(Gls)
1988	Blantyre Victoria	?	(?)
1988–1999	Stirling Albion	338	(0)
1999	→ Raith Rovers (loan)	3	(0)
1999–2002	Stranraer	104	(1)
2002–2005	Airdrie United	100	(0)
2005–2008	Ayr United	101	(0)
2008–2009	Dumbarton	16	(0)
2009–2010	Queen of the South	0	(0)
2010	Queen's Park	15	(0)
Total		677	(1)
- * Club domestic league appearances and goals

Mark McGeown (born 10 May 1970 in Paisley, Scotland) is a Scottish former footballer, who last played for Queen's Park in the Scottish Football League Third Division. He was a goalkeeper.

McGeown began his senior career with Stirling Albion where he spent over a decade and made 338 league appearances. He has also played for Raith Rovers (on loan), Stranraer, Airdrie United, Ayr United, Dumbarton, Queen of the South and Queens Park .

McGeown signed for Queen of the South on amateur forms in September 2009, as cover for David Hutton whilst Ludovic Roy recovered from a hip injury. McGeown left the Dumfries club in the January 2010 transfer window without having played a first team. McGeown signed for Queens Park in January 2010 and finished his career at the end of that season.

Whilst playing for Stranraer he was officially credited with scoring one goal in a league match.

== Honours ==
Dumbarton

- Scottish Division Three (fourth tier): Winners 2008–09

Airdrie United

- Scottish Division Two (3rd tier): Winners 2003–04

Stirling Albion

- Scottish Division Two (3rd tier): Winners 1995–96

Stirling Albion

- Scottish Division Two (3rd tier): Winners 1990–91

== See also ==
- List of footballers in Scotland by number of league appearances (500+)
