= Paul McLeod =

Scottish footballer

Personal information
- Date of birth: 22 May 1987 (age 39)
- Place of birth: Bellshill, Scotland
- Position: Striker

Youth career
- Hamilton Academical

Senior career*
Years	Team	Apps	(Gls)
2004–2008	Hamilton Academical	50	(8)
2006	→ Alloa Athletic (loan)	12	(1)
2007	→ Alloa Athletic (loan)	1	(0)
2008	→ Ayr United (loan)	13	(1)
2008–2009	Dumbarton	24	(6)
2009	Clyde	15	(3)
2010–2011	Albion Rovers	32	(8)
Total		147	(27)
- * Club domestic league appearances and goals

Paul McLeod (born 22 May 1987) is a Scottish professional footballer. After his release by Albion Rovers in January 2011, he has recently signed for Glasgow Junior side Petershill, and he made his debut as a substitute in an Emirates Scottish Junior Cup 4th Round tie at Dunbar United on 19 February 2011.

== Career ==
McLeod made his debut for Hamilton Academical against Queen of the South on 1 January 2005, scoring the winner for Accies. After playing in the Hamilton first team for a while, he was twice loaned out to Second Division side Alloa Athletic; the first time in the 2005-06 season and then again during the 2006-07 season.

After being rewarded with a new contract, McLeod was once again loaned out to a Second Division side, this time Ayr United.

McLeod was released by Hamilton in September 2008. He then joined Dumbarton. He spent a year with the Sons, winning the Scottish Third Division, before signing for Clyde. He was released from his contract in December 2009, after making 17 appearances, scoring 3 goals.

== Honours ==
Dumbarton

- Scottish Division Three (fourth tier): Winners 2008–09
