= Steven Weir =

Scottish footballer

Personal information
- Date of birth: 3 October 1988 (age 38)
- Place of birth: Harthill, Scotland
- Position: Striker

Team information
- Current team: Fauldhouse

Senior career*
Years	Team	Apps	(Gls)
2004–2008	Livingston	18	(1)
2007	→ Cowdenbeath (loan)	7	(0)
2008–2009	Dumbarton	1	(0)
2008–2009	Arbroath	24	(5)
2009	Whitburn		
2009–2011	Shepparton South		
2011	East Fife	1	(0)
2011	Hume City		
2011	South Melbourne FC		
2012	Moreland Zebras FC		
2012–2013	Stirling Albion		
2013–2014	Broxburn Athletic		
2014–2015	Penicuik Athletic	17	(3)
2015–2016	Armadale Thistle		
2016–2017	Fauldhouse United		
2017–2018	Arthurlie		
2018–2020	Harthill		
2020–	Fauldhouse United		
- * Club domestic league appearances and goals

Steven Weir (born 3 October 1988) is a Scottish footballer who plays as a striker for West of Scotland Football League club Fauldhouse United.

== Career ==
Born in Harthill, Scotland, he started his career with Livingston, where he also spent a spell on loan at Cowdenbeath. He joined Arbroath before moving to Australia where he played for North Eastern Soccer League side Shepparton South. He scored 28 goals in 12 games in his first season with the club, and played his first match for the team four hours after arriving in Australia.

In January 2011 he returned to Scotland during the Australian summer break, where he joined East Fife, playing into two matches. He then returned to Australia where he joined Victorian Premier League side Hume City.

In August 2012, Weir signed for Scottish club Stirling Albion on a short-term contract. He left Stirling Albion to sign for Junior side Broxburn Athletic in January 2013 when his short-term contract expired.

He joined Penicuik Athletic in September 2014. His left the club at the end of the season to join Armadale Thistle.

His brother is Graham Weir is also a footballer who plays for Junior team Linlithgow Rose.
