= Martin McNiff =

Scottish footballer

Personal information
- Date of birth: 23 August 1991 (age 35)
- Place of birth: Clydebank, Scotland
- Position: Defender

Senior career*
Years	Team	Apps	(Gls)
2008–2014	Dumbarton	81	(3)
2013	→ Annan Athletic (loan)	16	(2)
2013–2014	→ Annan Athletic (loan)	32	(3)
2014–2016	Annan Athletic	70	(2)
2016–2021	Clyde	140	(10)
2021–22	Stirling Albion	24	(2)
2022–23	Dumbarton	35	(3)
2023–	Drumchapel United		
- * Club domestic league appearances and goals as of 18:39, 6 May 2023 (UTC)

Martin McNiff (born 23 August 1991) is a Scottish footballer who plays as a defender for West of Scotland Football League side Drumchapel United. McNiff has previously played for Dumbarton, Annan Athletic, Clyde and Stirling Albion.

McNiff started his career as a youth player at Dumbarton, making his debut in 2008 as a 17-year-old whilst still at school in a 3-1 victory against Albion Rovers. He established himself in the first team over the following three seasons, including making 29 appearances as the Sons won promotion to the Scottish First Division via the playoffs in 2011/12. in 2012-13 he joined Annan Athletic on loan, before spending a second spell at Galabank in 2013-14. He signed a permanent deal with the club in the summer of 2014.

McNiff then joined Clyde in 2016, becoming the first Clyde defender to score ten goals in one season since 1934–35 in April 2019 and the first defender to register ten goals from open play. The team won promotion to League One in 2018–19. At the PFA Scotland awards, he was named in Team of the Year for League Two He returned to Dumbarton after a season with Stirling Albion in May 2022, making 42 appearances for the club before leaving in the summer of 2023 and joining Drumchapel United.

== Career statistics ==
As of 20:11, 13 May 2023 (UTC)

Appearances and goals by club, season and competition
Club	Season	League			Scottish Cup		League Cup		Other		Total	
Club	Season	Division	Apps	Goals	Apps	Goals	Apps	Goals	Apps	Goals	Apps	Goals
Dumbarton	2008–09	Scottish Third Division	1	0	0	0	0	0	0	0	1	0
Dumbarton	2009–10	Scottish Second Division	15	0	0	0	1	0	0	0	16	0
Dumbarton	2010–11	Scottish Second Division	27	1	0	0	0	0	0	0	27	1
Dumbarton	2011–12	Scottish Second Division	29	2	0	0	0	0	0	0	29	2
Dumbarton	2012–13	Scottish First Division	9	0	1	0	1	0	0	0	11	0
Dumbarton	Dumbarton total		81	3	1	0	2	0	0	0	84	3
Annan Athletic (loan)	2012–13	Scottish Third Division	16	2	0	0	0	0	0	0	16	2
Annan Athletic (loan)	2013–14	Scottish League Two	32	3	4	1	0	0	2 (Note: Appearances in the League One play-offs)	1	38	5
Annan Athletic	2014–15	Scottish League Two	34	2	4	0	1	0	1 (Note: Appearances in the Scottish Challenge Cup)	0	40	2
Annan Athletic	2015–16	Scottish League Two	36	0	5	0	1	0	2	0	44	0
Annan Athletic	Annan Athletic total		70	2	9	0	2	0	3	0	84	2
Clyde	2016–17	Scottish League Two	31	1	6	0	4	0	0	0	41	1
Clyde	2017–18	Scottish League Two	36	1	2	0	4	0	1	1	43	2
Clyde	2018–19	Scottish League Two	29	8	1	0	3	2	4 (Note: Appearances in the League One play-offs)	1	37	11
Clyde	2019–20	Scottish League One	26	0	2	0	4	0	4	2	36	2
Clyde	2020–21	Scottish League One	18	0	2	0	4	0	0	0	24	0
Clyde	Clyde total		140	10	13	0	19	2	9	4	181	16
Stirling Albion	2021–22	Scottish League Two	24	2	1	0	4	1	0	0	29	3
Dumbarton	2022–23	Scottish League Two	35	3	3	0	3	0	2	0	42	3
Career total			399	25	31	1	30	3	16	5	474	34
