= Michael O'Byrne =

Scottish footballer

Mick O'Byrne
Personal information
- Full name: Michael O'Byrne
- Date of birth: 7 September 1988 (age 38)
- Position: Defender

Team information
- Current team: Rutherglen Glencairn

Senior career*
Years	Team	Apps	(Gls)
2007–2009	Dumbarton	40	(1)
2009–2010	Albion Rovers	30	(2)
2010–2012	Livingston	12	(0)
2011–2012	→ Albion Rovers (loan)	31	(3)
2012–2013	Albion Rovers	9	(0)
2013–2014	Airdrie	9	(0)
2013–2014	→ Stirling Albion (loan)	11	(0)
2014-2015	Linlithgow Rose		
2015-2020	Kilbirnie Ladeside		
2020-	Rutherglen Glencairn		
- * Club domestic league appearances and goals

Michael 'Mick' O'Bryne (born 7 September 1988) is a Scottish footballer who plays for Rutherglen Glencairn. He played 'senior' for Dumbarton, Albion Rovers, Livingston, Airdrie, Stirling Albion and Linlithgow Rose.

He signed for Rutherglen Glencairn in 2020 after a spell at Kilbirnie Ladeside.
