= Scott Walker (footballer) =

Scottish footballer

Personal information
- Full name: Scott Edward Walker
- Date of birth: 5 March 1975 (age 51)
- Place of birth: Paisley, Scotland
- Position: Central defender

Youth career
- Dalry Thistle
- 1995–1997: Kilmarnock
- 1997: Kilwinning Rangers

Senior career*
Years	Team	Apps	(Gls)
1997–1999	East Stirlingshire	42	(4)
1999–2002	St Mirren	97	(9)
2002–2003	Dunfermline Athletic	20	(2)
2003	St Mirren	1	(0)
2003–2004	Alloa Athletic	11	(0)
2004	Brechin City	1	(0)
2004	Hartlepool United	6	(0)
2004–2008	Brechin City	127	(9)
2008–2009	Ayr United	34	(1)
2009–2011	Alloa Athletic	63	(5)
- Linlithgow Rose
Total		402	(30)
- * Club domestic league appearances and goals

Scott Edward Walker (born 5 March 1975) is a Scottish footballer who played for several clubs in Scotland and England, including St Mirren, Dunfermline Athletic and Hartlepool United.
