= David McEwan (footballer) =

Scottish footballer

Personal information
- Full name: David McEwan
- Date of birth: 26 February 1982 (age 44)
- Place of birth: Lanark, Scotland
- Height: 1.83 m (6 ft 0 in)
- Position: Goalkeeper

Senior career*
Years	Team	Apps	(Gls)
2000–2004	Livingston	5	(0)
2002	→ Clyde (loan)	1	(0)
2003–2004	→ Hamilton Academical (loan)	19	(0)
2004–2007	Hamilton Academical	97	(0)
2007	Alloa Athletic	4	(0)
2007–2008	Derry City		
2008–2010	Dumbarton	24	(0)
2010–2014	Larkhall Thistle		

International career
2002	Scotland U21	2	(0)
- * Club domestic league appearances and goals as of 1 July 2010

David McEwan (born 26 December 1981 in Lanark) is a Scottish former footballer. He played as a goalkeeper.

In his career he has played for Livingston, Clyde (on loan), Hamilton Academical (on loan and then permanently), Alloa Athletic, Dumbarton and Irish side Derry City.

== Career ==
McEwan began his career in the youth team of Livingston, before being loaned out to Clyde and Hamilton Academical.

After being released by Livi in 2004, he made his loan spell at Hamilton permanent. After over 100 appearances for Accies, he moved for a short time to Recreation Park to play for Alloa Athletic.

He then spent a season in Ireland with Derry City.

McEwan signed for Dumbarton in May 2008 after leaving Derry City, but was released at the end of the 2009–10 season. He then joined the Junior ranks with Larkhall Thistle.

== Honours ==
Livingston

- Scottish First Division (second tier): Winners 2000–01

Dumbarton

- Scottish Division Three (fourth tier): Winners 2008–09
