= Gordon Lennon =

Northern Irish footballer (1983-2009)

Personal information
- Full name: Gordon Lennon
- Date of birth: 15 February 1983
- Place of birth: Larne, Northern Ireland
- Date of death: 7 June 2009 (aged 26)
- Place of death: Inverness, Scotland
- Position: Defender

Youth career
- Harmony Row Boys Club

Senior career*
Years	Team	Apps	(Gls)
2005–2007	Albion Rovers	68	(2)
2007–2008	Partick Thistle	0	(0)
2007–2008	→ Stenhousemuir (loan)	10	(0)
2008–2009	Dumbarton	50	(1)
Total		128	(3)
- * Club domestic league appearances and goals

Gordon Lennon (15 February 1983 – 7 June 2009) was a Northern Irish association footballer. Starting his career at Albion Rovers, he signed for Partick Thistle in 2007, though he made no appearances for the first team and spent most of his season with the club on loan to Stenhousemuir. After moving to Dumbarton in 2008, he became club captain and helped secure the team's promotion to the Scottish Second Division.

== Career ==
Lennon was born in Larne, Northern Ireland. He was named Albion's Player of the Year in 2006–07.

In 2007, after several weeks of negotiations, Scottish First Division club Partick Thistle signed Lennon, beating Ross County and Airdrie United to his signature. Manager Ian McCall expected at the time that Lennon would fight for a first-team place at the club.

He did not make any first team appearances for Thistle and was loaned to Stenhousemuir.

Lennon moved to Dumbarton in 2008, and captained Dumbarton to the Scottish Third Division title in 2008–09.

== Death ==
Lennon died in an off-road accident at the age of 26 while on a family break near Dingwall – the car in which he was a passenger struck an electrical pole which snapped causing live wires to fall onto the bodywork, and he was fatally electrocuted when he tried to exit the vehicle. In August 2010, it was reported that a fatal accident inquiry would be held at Dingwall Sheriff Court regarding Lennon's death.

== Personal life ==
He was father to a son, Kai, with his partner Kelly Dempsey.

== Honours ==
=== Club ===
Dumbarton

- Scottish Third Division: 2008–09

=== Individual ===
- Albion Rovers Player of the Year: 2006–07
