= Stevie Murray =

Scottish footballer

Personal information
- Full name: Stephen Murray
- Date of birth: 18 April 1983 (age 43)
- Place of birth: Bellshill, Scotland
- Position: Midfielder

Youth career
- Celtic

Senior career*
Years	Team	Apps	(Gls)
2001–2007	Kilmarnock	105	(3)
2007	→ Queen of the South (loan)	14	(2)
2007–2008	Partick Thistle	28	(0)
2008–2010	Dumbarton	67	(5)
2010–2012	Stenhousemuir	62	(4)
2017–2019	BSC Glasgow		
- * Club domestic league appearances and goals as of 21 June 2019

Stevie Murray (born 18 April 1983 in Bellshill) is a Scottish professional footballer who last played for BSC Glasgow in the Lowland Football League

== Career ==
Murray spent his youth career with Celtic Boys Club.

=== Kilmarnock ===
Murray signed for Kilmarnock at the start of the 2001-02 season. Murray stayed with the Ayrshire club for 6 years, where he scored 3 goals in 105 league appearances.

=== Queen of the South (loan) ===
Murray joined Queen of the South on loan in the January 2007 transfer window, as part of the deal that brought Willie Gibson to Rugby Park. He was joined in Dumfries by teammate Jamie Adams, who also joined Queen of the South as a loan player at the same time. Murray spent 6 months at Palmerston Park, where he scored 2 goals in 14 league appearances.

=== Partick Thistle ===
Murray signed for Partick Thistle at the start of the 2007-08 season. Murray stayed one year with the Firhill club, where he failed to score a league goal in 28 league appearances.

=== Dumbarton ===
Murray signed a two-year contract with Dumbarton in June 2008.

Murray's most memorable moment for Dumbarton was when he chipped the Berwick Rangers goalkeeper from the halfway line on 1 November 2008 in a league match that ended in a 5–2 win. He was a member of the side which won the 2008-09 Scottish Third Division title, becoming a firm fans' favourite.

He left the club in May 2010.

=== Stenhousemuir ===
At the end of the 2009–10 season, Murray signed for Stenhousemuir on a free transfer.

=== BSC Glasgow ===
After a spell in amateur football, Murray joined Lowland Football League side BSC Glasgow in June 2017.

== Honours ==
Dumbarton

- Scottish Division Three (fourth tier): Winners 2008–09
