= Ross Clark (footballer) =

Scottish footballer (born 1983)

Personal information
- Date of birth: 7 February 1983 (age 43)
- Place of birth: Rutherglen, Scotland
- Position: Midfielder

Youth career
- Queens Park Youth

Senior career*
Years	Team	Apps	(Gls)
2000–2006	Queen's Park	125	(9)
2006–2008	Alloa Athletic	37	(3)
2008–2010	Dumbarton	53	(16)
2010–2011	Stenhousemuir	15	(5)
Total		230	(33)
- * Club domestic league appearances and goals

Ross Clark (born 7 February 1983) is a Scottish footballer who played for Queen's Park, Alloa Athletic, Dumbarton and Stenhousemuir.

== Honours ==
Dumbarton

- Scottish Division Three (fourth tier): Winners 2008–09
