= Ryan McStay =

Scottish footballer

Personal information
- Full name: Ryan Michael McStay
- Date of birth: 4 December 1985 (age 40)
- Place of birth: Bellshill, Scotland
- Position: Midfielder

Team information
- Current team: St Roch's FC

Youth career
- Falkirk

Senior career*
Years	Team	Apps	(Gls)
2003–2007	Falkirk	28	(1)
2006	→ Queen of the South (loan)	14	(0)
2007–2009	Partick Thistle	22	(0)
2009–2011	Dumbarton	65	(3)
2011–2012	Albion Rovers	32	(2)
2012–2013	Ayr United	19	(0)
2013–2014	Portadown		
2014–2016	Annan Athletic	40	(5)
2016–2017	Shettleston		
2017	Pollok		
2017–2019	BSC Glasgow		

Managerial career
- 2016–2017: Shettleston
- * Club domestic league appearances and goals as of 17:00, 1 January 2018 (UTC)

Ryan Michael McStay (born 4 December 1985 in Bellshill, Scotland), is a Scottish professional footballer who plays for St Roch's FC. McStay has previously played in the Scottish Premier League for Falkirk.

McStay started his career with Falkirk at U16 D-Form level, before playing for Partick Thistle, Dumbarton and Albion Rovers. McStay also had a loan spell at Queen of the South when he was at the Bairns.

== Career ==
At Falkirk, McStay scored the goal that got the club promoted to the SPL in the 2004–2005 season. Despite this, McStay turned down a new deal at Falkirk in the summer of 2007 as he was in search of first-team football elsewhere. McStay signed for Partick Thistle on 1 June 2007, as one of three signings by new manager Ian McCall.

On 31 January 2009, McStay left by mutual consent at the Maryhill club. On that same day, McStay played and signed for Dumbarton to stay at the club for the remainder of the season and played a part in winning the third division title.

On 18 July 2011, McStay signed for his local and newly promoted, Second Division club Albion Rovers on a one-year contract. McStay left the Coatbridge club after the 2011-12 season and then signed for Ayr United on a 12-month contract.

In July 2013 McStay then departed for NIFL Premiership club Portadown before the start of September 2013.

On 3 July 2014, McStay signed for Annan Athletic. This was the second time that Jim Chapman, the Black and Golds' manager had McStay as a player, having played at the Sons when Chapman was in charge there. McStay was then announced as one of the joint player-managers at Shettleston in March 2016, alongside his Galabankies team-mate Peter Weatherson, with their tenure to commence at the start of the 2016–17 season in the Scottish Juniors, West Region.

McStay departed Shettleston by mutual consent, alongside joint player-manager Weatherson on 9 January 2017, after a 1–1 draw at home to Irvine Meadow on 7 January 2017.

On 15 February 2017, McStay signed for Pollok. He joined BSC Glasgow in the summer of 2017.

== Honours ==
Dumbarton

- Scottish Division Three (fourth tier): Winners 2008–09
