= Derek Carcary =

Scottish footballer

Personal information
- Date of birth: 11 July 1986 (age 40)
- Place of birth: Glasgow, Scotland
- Position: Forward

Youth career
- Queens Park

Senior career*
Years	Team	Apps	(Gls)
2003–2004	Queen's Park	22	(5)
2004–2006	Rangers	0	(0)
2006–2008	Raith Rovers	42	(4)
2008–2011	Dumbarton	86	(19)
2011–2014	Brechin City	60	(15)
2014	Annan Athletic	6	(1)
2014–2015	Clydebank		
- * Club domestic league appearances and goals

Derek Carcary (born 11 July 1986) is a Scottish former footballer who played for Queen's Park, Rangers, Raith Rovers, Dumbarton, Brechin City and Annan Athletic and Clydebank.

== Honours ==
Dumbarton

- Scottish Division Three (fourth tier): Winners 2008–09
