= 2008–09 Scottish Third Division =

Irn-Bru Scottish Third Division
- Season: 2008–09
- Champions: Dumbarton
- Promoted: Dumbarton; Stenhousemuir; Cowdenbeath
- Relegated: n/a
- Matches: 180
- Goals: 497 (2.76 per match)
- Top goalscorer: Scott Dalziel (15); Mike Jack (15)
- Biggest home win: Annan Athletic 6–0 Elgin City (7 March 2009); Dumbarton 6–0 Elgin City (2 May 2009)
- Biggest away win: Elgin City 1–6 Albion Rovers (20 September 2008)
- Highest scoring: Forfar Athletic 5–4 Berwick Rangers (28 February 2009)
- Longest winning run: 5 games Cowdenbeath; Stenhousemuir
- Longest unbeaten run: 10 games Cowdenbeath
- Longest winless run: 13 games Albion Rovers
- Longest losing run: 7 games Elgin City

The 2008–09 Scottish Football League Third Division (also known as the 2008–09 Irn-Bru Scottish Football League Third Division for sponsorship reasons) was the 15th season in the format of ten teams in the fourth-tier of Scottish football. The season started on 2 August 2008 and ended on 9 May 2009. Dumbarton F.C. finished top and were promoted alongside Stenhousemuir F.C. as play-off winners. Cowdenbeath F.C. were also promoted due to Livingston being demoted to the Third Division.

== Teams for 2008–09 ==
Location of teams in 2008–09 Scottish Third Division

East Fife as champions of the 2007–08 season were directly promoted to the 2008–09 Scottish Second Division. They were replaced by Berwick Rangers who finished bottom of the 2007–08 Scottish Second Division.

A second promotion place was available via a play-off tournament between the ninth-placed team of the 2007–08 Scottish Second Division, Cowdenbeath, and the sides ranked second, third and fourth in the 2007–08 Scottish Third Division, Stranraer, Montrose and Arbroath respectively. The play off was won by Arbroath who defeated Stranraer in the final. Cowdenbeath were therefore relegated. However, due to Gretna's expulsion from the Football League, an extra promotion place was awarded, thus Stranraer as losing play-off finalists were also promoted.

Annan Athletic, formerly of the East of Scotland League, were admitted to the SFL to replace Gretna, who resigned their league status on 3 June.) The SFL voted on the matter on 3 July, with 5 clubs having put forward applications. Annan, who like Gretna are from the Dumfries and Galloway region, were chosen above other applicants Cove Rangers, Edinburgh City, Preston Athletic and Spartans.

=== Overview ===
Relegated from Second Division to Third Division

- Berwick Rangers
- Cowdenbeath (via play-offs)

Promoted from Third Division to Second Division

- East Fife
- Arbroath (via play-offs)
- Stranraer (losing play-off finalists, promoted due to Gretna's demotion to Third Division)

Newly admitted into SFL

- Annan Athletic

== Stadia and attendances ==
Team	Stadium	Capacity	Highest	Lowest	Average
Annan Athletic	Galabank Stadium	3,500	1,343	422	734
Dumbarton	Strathclyde Homes Stadium	2,025	1,398	462	716
Stenhousemuir	Ochilview Park	2,624	805	311	496
Forfar Athletic	Station Park	5,177	621	362	460
East Stirlingshire	Ochilview Park^{[A]}	2,624	812	343	450
Cowdenbeath	Central Park	2,000	1,181	193	415
Berwick Rangers	Shielfield Park	4,131	570	288	414
Elgin City	Borough Briggs	3,927	537	276	392
Montrose	Links Park	3,292	570	294	379
Albion Rovers	Cliftonhill	1,249	452	237	312

Source: The League Insider
A.East Stirlingshire ground shared with Stenhousemuir.

== Managerial changes ==
Team	Outgoing manager	Manner of departure	Date of vacancy	Replaced by	Date of appointment	Table position
Albion Rovers	(Scotland) John McCormack	Resigned	28 June	(Scotland) Paul Martin	9 July	pre-season
Montrose	(Scotland) Jim Weir	Sacked	19 October	(Scotland) Steven Tweed	15 January 2009	4
Berwick Rangers	(Scotland) Alan McGonigal	Resigned	13 November	(Scotland) Jimmy Crease	26 December	9
Elgin City	(Scotland) Robbie Williamson	Resigned	20 December 2008	(Scotland) Ross Jack	23 January	10

== League table ==
Pos	Team	Pld	W	D	L	GF	GA	GD	Pts	Promotion or qualification
1	Dumbarton (C, P)	36	19	10	7	65	36	+29	67	Promotion to the Second Division
2	Cowdenbeath (P)	36	18	9	9	48	34	+14	63 (Note: Cowdenbeath were promoted due to Livingston's demotion from the First Division to the Third.)	Qualification for the Second Division Play-offs (Note: The 2nd, 3rd and 4th placed teams will be entered into a play-off with the Second Division's 9th placed team. The winning team will be awarded a place in the 2009–10 Second Division.)
3	East Stirlingshire	36	19	4	13	57	50	+7	61	Qualification for the Second Division Play-offs
4	Stenhousemuir (O, P)	36	16	8	12	55	46	+9	56	Qualification for the Second Division Play-offs
5	Montrose	36	16	6	14	47	48	−1	54	
6	Forfar Athletic	36	14	9	13	53	51	+2	51	
7	Annan Athletic	36	14	8	14	56	45	+11	50	
8	Albion Rovers	36	11	6	19	39	47	−8	39	
9	Berwick Rangers	36	10	7	19	46	61	−15	37	
10	Elgin City	36	7	5	24	31	79	−48	26	

Source: BBC Sport
Rules for classification: 1) points; 2) goal difference; 3) number of goals scored.
(C) Champions; (O) Play-off winners; (P) Promoted

== Results ==
Teams play each other four times in this league. In the first half of the season each team plays every other team twice (home and away) and then do the same in the second half of the season.

=== First half of season ===
Home \ Away	ALB	ANN	BER	COW	DUM	EST	ELG	FOR	MON	STE
Albion Rovers		0–1	2–0	3–1	1–3	0–2	2–1	1–3	0–1	1–2
Annan Athletic	2–4		1–2	0–1	2–1	2–1	5–0	1–3	1–2	1–1
Berwick Rangers	0–3	3–0		2–3	1–2	2–1	1–1	2–2	3–2	3–2
Cowdenbeath	2–1	1–4	2–1		2–0	0–0	4–1	0–0	2–1	1–2
Dumbarton	1–1	4–1	5–2	2–1		1–1	2–0	3–0	1–1	1–2
East Stirlingshire	1–0	2–1	1–0	1–4	5–2		5–2	0–3	5–0	0–2
Elgin City	1–6	1–2	0–2	0–2	1–1	0–4		0–1	1–2	4–2
Forfar Athletic	0–0	2–1	2–1	0–1	2–2	2–3	0–1		0–1	1–0
Montrose	1–2	1–1	1–1	0–1	1–2	3–0	1–0	1–0		0–3
Stenhousemuir	1–0	0–0	2–0	1–0	1–1	1–1	3–0	1–1	2–2	

Source: BBC Sport
Legend: Blue = home team win; Yellow = draw; Red = away team win.

=== Second half of season ===
Home \ Away	ALB	ANN	BER	COW	DUM	EST	ELG	FOR	MON	STE
Albion Rovers		2–1	2–1	0–0	1–1	0–2	0–3	2–0	0–1	1–2
Annan Athletic	1–1		1–1	3–1	1–3	4–0	6–0	1–0	2–1	1–1
Berwick Rangers	1–1	1–1		1–0	1–2	2–2	2–1	0–2	0–1	0–3
Cowdenbeath	2–1	1–0	2–0		0–0	2–0	1–1	2–2	2–1	1–0
Dumbarton	1–0	0–2	2–0	1–1		2–0	6–0	4–0	1–1	1–0
East Stirlingshire	0–1	1–1	0–4	0–2	3–1		1–0	4–2	2–1	0–3
Elgin City	1–0	0–1	2–0	1–1	0–2	0–2		1–4	1–0	2–0
Forfar Athletic	4–0	2–1	5–4	1–1	0–2	0–2	1–1		0–3	4–4
Montrose	1–0	0–3	1–1	2–1	1–0	0–2	3–1	1–3		5–3
Stenhousemuir	2–1	1–0	1–2	1–0	0–2	1–4	4–2	0–1	1–3	

Source: BBC Sport
Legend: Blue = home team win; Yellow = draw; Red = away team win.

== Top scorers ==
Rank	Scorer	Team	Goals
1	(Scotland) Mike Jack	Annan Athletic	15
1	(Scotland) Scott Dalziel	Stenhousemuir	15
3	(Scotland) Darren Gribben	Berwick Rangers	14
3	(Scotland) Ross Clark	Dumbarton	14
3	(Scotland) Andy Rodgers	East Stirlingshire	14
3	(Scotland) Brian Graham	East Stirlingshire	14
7	(Scotland) Ross Campbell	Forfar Athletic	13
8	(Scotland) John Gemmell	Cowdenbeath	12
8	(Scotland) Kevin Motion	Stenhousemuir	12
10	(Scotland) Bobby Barr	Albion Rovers	11
10	(Scotland) Derek Carcary	Dumbarton	11

Source: The League Insider

== Events ==
- 3 July – Annan Athletic, formerly of the East of Scotland League were admitted to the SFL, beating Cove Rangers, Edinburgh City, Preston Athletic and Spartans. They replaced Gretna, who resigned their league status on 3 June.
- 13 November – A consortium led by Berwick Rangers Supporters Club agreed a deal to take over the club. Following a poor run of form, manager Allan McGonigal resigned at the same time saying "I made up my mind that when the current directors left I would move on."

== Monthly awards ==
Month	First Division manager		SFL Player		SFL Young player	
Month	Manager	Club	Player	Club	Player	Club
August	(Italy) Roberto Landi	Livingston	(Scotland) Stephen Robertson	Airdrie United	(Scotland) Leigh Griffiths	Livingston
September	(Scotland) Jim McIntyre	Dunfermline Athletic	(Scotland) Paul McManus	East Fife	(Scotland) Calum Elliot	Livingston
October	(Scotland) Derek McInnes	St Johnstone	(Scotland) Steven Milne	St Johnstone	(England) Dominic Shimmin	Greenock Morton
November	(Scotland) Jocky Scott	Dundee	(Scotland) Bryan Prunty	Ayr United	(Scotland) Kyle Benedictus	Dundee
December	(Scotland) John Brown	Clyde	(Scotland) Alan Main	St Johnstone	(Scotland) Chris McMenamin	Berwick Rangers
January	(Scotland) Ian McCall	Partick Thistle	(Scotland) Willie McLaren	Clyde	(Scotland) Bobby Barr	Albion Rovers
February	(Scotland) Jocky Scott	Dundee	(Scotland) Gary Harkins	Partick Thistle	(Scotland) Fraser McLaren	Berwick Rangers
March	(Scotland) Paul Hegarty	Livingston	(Scotland) Kevin Rutkiewicz	St Johnstone	(Scotland) Leigh Griffiths	Livingston
April	(Scotland) Gordon Chisholm	Queen of the South	(Scotland) Stephen Dobbie	Queen of the South	(Scotland) Kevin Moon	St Johnstone
