= List of Ayr United F.C. seasons =

Ayr United Football Club are a Scottish association football team based in Ayr, South Ayrshire. This list details the club's achievements in major competitions, and the top scorers for each season.

== Key ==
- P = Played
- W = Games won
- D = Games drawn
- L = Games lost
- F = Goals for
- A = Goals against
- Pts = Points
- Pos = Final position
- R1 = Round 1
- R2 = Round 2
- R3 = Round 3
- R4 = Round 4
- R5 = Round 5
- QF = Quarter-finals
- SF = Semi-finals
- F = Final

Champions	Runners-up	Semi Final	Quarter Final	Promoted	Relegated	Current Season

== Seasons ==
Results of league and cup competitions by season
Season	Manager	Division	Tier	P	W	D	L	F	A	Pts	Pos	Scottish Cup	League Cup	Challenge Cup	Name	Goals
Season	Manager	League										Scottish Cup	League Cup	Challenge Cup	Top goalscorer	
1910–11	Committee	Div 2 (Old)	2	22	12	3	7	54	36	27	2nd	-				
1911–12	Committee	Div 2 (Old)	2	22	16	3	3	54	24	35	1st	R1				
1912–13	Committee	Div 2 (Old)	2	26	13	8	5	45	19	34	1st	R2				
1913–14	Committee	Div 1 (Old)	1	38	13	7	18	56	72	33	9th					
1914–15	(England) Herbert Dainty	Div 1 (Old)	1	38	20	8	10	55	40	48	4th					
1915–16	Lawrence Gemson	Div 1 (Old)	1	38	20	8	10	72	45	48	4th					
1916–17	Lawrence Gemson	Div 1 (Old)	1	38	12	7	19	47	59	31	15th					
1917–18	Lawrence Gemson	Div 1 (Old)	1	34	5	9	20	32	61	19	18th					
1918–19	(Scotland) John Cameron	Div 1 (Old)	1	34	15	8	11	62	53	38	5th					
1919–20	(Scotland) James McDonald	Div 1 (Old)	1	42	15	10	17	72	69	40	10th	R3				
1920–21	(Scotland) James McDonald	Div 1 (Old)	1	42	14	12	16	62	69	40	14th	R3				
1921–22	(Scotland) James McDonald	Div 1 (Old)	1	42	13	12	17	55	63	38	14th	R2				
1922–23	(Scotland) James McDonald	Div 1 (Old)	1	38	13	12	13	43	44	38	10th	R3				
1923–24	(Scotland) Jimmy Richardson	Div 1 (Old)	1	38	12	10	16	38	60	34	14th	R4				
1924–25	(Scotland) Jimmy Hay	Div 1 (Old)	1	38	11	8	19	43	65	30	19th	R2				
1925–26	(Scotland) Jimmy Hay	Div 2 (Old)	2	38	20	12	6	77	39	52	3rd	R1				
1926–27	Archie Buchanan	Div 2 (Old)	2	38	13	15	10	67	68	41	8th					
1927–28	Archie Buchanan	Div 2 (Old)	2	38	24	6	8	117	60	54	1st	R2				
1928–29	Archie Buchanan	Div 1 (Old)	1	38	12	7	19	65	84	31	16th	R3				
1929–30	Archie Buchanan	Div 1 (Old)	1	38	16	6	16	70	92	38	9th	R2				
1930–31	Archie Buchanan	Div 1 (Old)	1	38	8	11	19	53	92	27	18th	R3				
1931–32	Alex Gibson	Div 1 (Old)	1	38	11	7	20	70	90	29	17th					
1932–33	Alex Gibson	Div 1 (Old)	1	38	13	4	21	62	95	30	16th	R2				
1933–34	Alex Gibson	Div 1 (Old)	1	38	16	10	12	87	92	42	8th	R2				
1934–35	Alex Gibson	Div 1 (Old)	1	38	12	5	21	61	112	29	18th	R2				
1935–36	(Northern Ireland) Frank Thompson	Div 1 (Old)	1	38	11	3	24	53	98	25	20th					
1936–37	(Northern Ireland) Frank Thompson	Div 2 (Old)	2	34	25	4	5	122	49	54	1st					
1937–38	(Northern Ireland) Frank Thompson	Div 1 (Old)	1	38	9	15	14	66	85	33	17th	R4				
1938–39	(Northern Ireland) Frank Thompson	Div 1 (Old)	1	38	13	9	16	76	83	35	14th					
1939–40	(Northern Ireland) Frank Thompson	Div 1 (Old)	1	5	2	0	3	10	17	4	18th					
1940–45		Not held		–	–	–	–	–	–	–	–				–	–
1946–47	(England) Bob Ferrier	Div 2 (Old)	2	26	9	2	15	56	73	20	11th	R2	Group			
1947–48	(England) Bob Ferrier	Div 2 (Old)	2	30	9	9	12	59	61	27	10th		Group			
1948–49		Div 2 (Old)	2	30	10	7	13	51	70	27	9th	(England) Bob Ferrier	Group			
1949–50	(Scotland) Archie Anderson	Div 2 (Old)	2	30	8	6	16	53	80	22	13th		Group			
1950–51	(Scotland) Archie Anderson	Div 2 (Old)	2	30	15	6	9	64	40	36	3rd	R4	SF			
1951–52	(Scotland) Archie Anderson	Div 2 (Old)	2	30	17	5	8	55	45	39	3rd		Group			
1952–53	(Scotland) Archie Anderson	Div 2 (Old)	2	30	17	2	11	76	56	36	5th	R3	Group			
1953–54	(Scotland) Reuben Bennett	Div 2 (Old)	2	30	11	8	11	50	56	30	9th	R2	QF			
1954–55	(Scotland) Reuben Bennett	Div 2 (Old)	2	30	14	4	12	61	73	32	8th		QF			
1955–56	(Scotland) Neil McBain	Div 2 (Old)	2	36	24	3	9	103	55	51	2nd		Group			
1956–57	(Scotland) Jackie Cox	Div 1 (Old)	1	34	7	5	22	48	89	19	18th	R5	Group			
1957–58	(Scotland) Jackie Cox	Div 2 (Old)	2	36	18	6	12	98	81	42	5th		Group			
1958–59	(Scotland) Jackie Cox	Div 2 (Old)	2	36	28	4	4	115	48	60	1st	R3	QF			
1959–60	(Scotland) Jackie Cox	Div 1 (Old)	1	34	14	6	14	65	73	34	8	R4	Group			
1960–61	(Scotland) Jackie Cox	Div 1 (Old)	1	34	5	12	17	51	81	22	18th	R2	Group			
1961–62	(Scotland) Gerry Mays	Div 2 (Old)	2	36	15	8	13	71	63	38	9th		QF			
1962–63	(Scotland) Neil McBain	Div 2 (Old)	2	36	13	8	15	68	77	34	13th	R2	Group			
1963–64	(Scotland) Bobby Flavell	Div 2 (Old)	2	36	12	5	19	58	83	29	14th	R4	Group			
1964–65	(Scotland) Tom McCreath	Div 2 (Old)	2	36	9	6	21	49	67	24	18th		Group			
1965–66	(Scotland) Tom McCreath	Div 2 (Old)	2	36	22	9	5	78	37	53	1st		QF			
1966–67	(Scotland) Ally MacLeod	Div 1 (Old)	1	34	1	7	26	20	86	9	18th		QF			
1967–68	(Scotland) Ally MacLeod	Div 2 (Old)	2	36	18	6	12	69	48	42	5th		QF			
1968–69	(Scotland) Ally MacLeod	Div 2 (Old)	2	36	23	7	6	82	31	53	2nd	R2	QF			
1969–70	(Scotland) Ally MacLeod	Div 1 (Old)	1	34	12	6	16	37	52	30	14th		SF			
1970–71	(Scotland) Ally MacLeod	Div 1 (Old)	1	34	9	8	17	37	54	26	14th	R3	Group			
1971–72	(Scotland) Ally MacLeod	Div 1 (Old)	1	34	9	10	15	40	58	28	12th	R4	Group			
1972–73	(Scotland) Ally MacLeod	Div 1 (Old)	1	34	16	8	10	50	51	40	6th	SF	Group			
1973–74	(Scotland) Ally MacLeod	Div 1 (Old)	1	34	15	8	11	44	40	38	7th	R5	Group			
1974–75	(Scotland) Ally MacLeod	Div 1 (Old)	1	34	14	8	12	50	61	36	7th	R3	Group			
1975–76	(Scotland) Alex Stuart	Prem	1	36	14	5	17	46	59	33	6th	R4	Group			
1976–77	(Scotland) Alex Stuart	Prem	1	36	11	8	17	44	68	30	8th	R4	Group			
1977–78	(Scotland) Alex Stuart	Prem	1	36	9	6	21	36	68	24	9th	R3	R3			
1978–79	(Scotland) Willie McLean	Div 1	2	39	21	5	13	71	52	47	4th	R4	QF			
1979–80	(Scotland) Willie McLean	Div 1	2	39	16	12	11	64	51	44	3rd	R4	R3			
1980–81	(Scotland) Willie McLean	Div 1	2	39	17	11	11	59	42	45	6th	R3	SF			
1981–82	(Scotland) Willie McLean	Div 1	2	39	15	12	12	56	50	42	6th	R3	Group			
1982–83	(Scotland) Willie McLean	Div 1	2	39	12	8	19	45	61	32	12th	R3	Group			
1983–84	(Scotland) George Caldwell	Div 1	2	39	10	12	17	56	70	32	12th	R3	R2			
1984–85	(Scotland) George Caldwell	Div 1	2	39	15	9	15	57	52	39	7th	R4	R3			
1985–86	(Scotland) Ally MacLeod	Div 1	2	39	10	11	18	41	60	31	13th	R4	R2			
1986–87	(Scotland) Ally MacLeod	Div 2	3	39	22	8	9	70	49	52	4th	R3	R3			
1987–88	(Scotland) Ally MacLeod	Div 2	3	39	27	7	5	95	31	61	1st	R3	R2			
1988–89	(Scotland) Ally MacLeod	Div 1	2	39	13	9	17	56	72	35	11th	R3	R2			
1989–90	(Scotland) Ally MacLeod	Div 1	2	39	11	13	15	41	62	35	10th	R3	R2			
1990–91	(Scotland) George Burley	Div 1	2	39	10	12	17	47	59	32	12th	R5	R2	Runners-up		
1991–92	(Scotland) George Burley	Div 1	2	44	18	11	15	63	55	47	6th	R3	QF	Runners-up		
1992–93	(Scotland) George Burley	Div 1	2	44	14	18	12	49	44	46	7th	R4	R2	R2		
1993–94	(England) Simon Stainrod	Div 1	2	44	14	14	16	42	52	42	7th	R3	R2	SF		
1994–95	(England) Simon Stainrod	Div 1	2	36	6	11	19	31	58	29	9th	R3	R2	QF		
1995–96	(Scotland) Gordon Dalziel	Div 2	3	36	11	12	13	40	40	45	6th	R2	R2	R1		
1996–97	(Scotland) Gordon Dalziel	Div 2	3	36	23	8	5	61	33	77	1st	R2	R3	R2		
1997–98	(Scotland) Gordon Dalziel	Div 1	2	36	10	10	16	40	56	40	7th	R5	R2	R2	Ian Ferguson	13
1998–99	(Scotland) Gordon Dalziel	Div 1	2	36	19	5	12	66	42	62	3rd	R5	QF	n/a	Glynn Hurst	20
1999–00	(Scotland) Gordon Dalziel	Div 1	2	36	10	8	18	42	52	38	7th	SF	R3	R1	Glynn Hurst	14
2000–01	(Scotland) Gordon Dalziel	Div 1	2	36	19	12	5	73	41	69	2nd	R3	R1	R1	Eddie Annand	19
2001–02	(Scotland) Gordon Dalziel	Div 1	2	36	13	13	10	53	44	52	3rd	SF	Runners-up	R2	Eddie Annand	21
2002–03	(Scotland) Campbell Money	Div 1	2	36	12	9	15	34	44	45	6th	R4	R2	R2	Stewart Kean	7
2003–04	(Scotland) Campbell Money	Div 1	2	36	6	13	17	37	58	31	9th	R3	R1	R1	Stewart Kean	10
2004–05	(Scotland) Mark Shanks	Div 2	3	36	11	9	16	39	54	42	8th	R4	R1	R1	Stewart Kean	10
2005–06	(Scotland) Bobby Connor	Div 2	3	36	10	12	14	56	61	42	6th	R3	R3	R1		
2006–07	(Scotland) Bobby Connor	Div 2	3	36	14	8	14	46	47	50	5th	R3	R2	QF	Jerome Vareille	8
2007–08	(Scotland) Brian Reid	Div 2	3	36	13	7	16	51	62	46	7th	R3	R1	SF	Alex Williams	18
2008–09	(Scotland) Brian Reid	Div 2	3	36	22	8	6	71	38	74	2nd	R4	R2	R1	Bryan Prunty	17
2009–10	(Scotland) Brian Reid	Div 1	2	36	7	10	19	29	60	31	10th	R5	R2	R1	Mark Roberts	9
2010–11	(Scotland) Brian Reid	Div 2	3	36	18	5	13	62	55	59	2nd	R5	R1	QF	Mark Roberts	26
2011–12	(Scotland) Brian Reid	Div 1	2	36	9	11	16	44	67	38	9th	QF	SF	QF	Mark Roberts	11
2012–13	(Scotland) Mark Roberts	Div 2	3	36	12	5	19	53	65	41	7th	R4	R2	R1	Michael Moffat	21
2013–14	(Scotland) Mark Roberts	L1	3	36	14	7	15	65	66	49	4th	R4	R1	R2	Michael Moffat	25
2014–15	(Scotland) Mark Roberts (Scotland) Ian McCall	L1	3	36	9	7	20	45	60	34	8th	R3	R2	R1	Alan Forrest	9
2015–16	(Scotland) Ian McCall	L1	3	36	19	4	13	65	47	61	2nd	R3	R2	R2	Craig Moore	15
2016–17	(Scotland) Ian McCall	Champ	2	36	7	12	17	33	62	33	10th	QF	R2	QF	Alan Forrest	6
2017–18	(Scotland) Ian McCall	L1	3	36	24	4	8	92	42	76	1st	R5	R2	R2	Lawrence Shankland	26
2018–19	(Scotland) Ian McCall	Champ	2	36	15	9	12	50	38	54	4th	R4	QF	R1	Lawrence Shankland	24
2019–20	(Scotland) Ian McCall (Scotland) Mark Kerr	Champ	2	27	12	4	11	38	35	40	4th	R5	Group	R3	Alan Forrest	10
2020–21	(Scotland) Mark Kerr (Scotland) David Hopkin	Champ	2	27	6	11	10	31	37	29	8th	R3	R2	—	Cammy Smith	6
2021–22	(Scotland) David Hopkin (Scotland) Jim Duffy (Scotland) Lee Bullen	Champ	2	36	9	12	15	39	52	39	8th	R4	R2	R2	Tomi Adeloye	11
2022–23	(Scotland) Lee Bullen	Champ	2	36	16	10	10	61	43	58	2nd	QF	Group	R3	Dipo Akinyemi	20
2023–24	(Scotland) Lee Bullen	Champ	2	36	12	8	16	53	61	44	7th	R5	R2	R3	Anton Downs	13
2024–25	(Scotland) Scott Brown	Champ	2	36	18	9	9	57	39	63	3rd	R5	Group	QF	George Oakley	13
2025–26	(Scotland) Scott Brown	Champ	2													
