= 1911–12 Ayr United F.C. season =

Ayr United
1911–12 season
- Manager: Selection Committee
- Stadium: Somerset Park
- Scottish Second Division: 1st
- Scottish Cup: First Round (lost to Leith Athletic
Home colours

The 1911–12 season is the 2nd season of competitive football by Ayr United.

== Competitions ==
Win Draw Loss

=== Friendly and Benefit Matches ===
15 August 1911 R. Cunningham's Testimonial	Ayr United	1–4	Rangers	Somerset Park, Ayr

2 March 1912 Friendly	Ayr United	1–0	Abercorn	Somerset Park, Ayr

23 March 1912 Friendly	Ayr United	3–2	St Mirren	Somerset Park, Ayr

22 April 1912 Benefit Match (Troon Masonic Lodge)	Ayr United	2–7	Rangers	Somerset Park, Ayr

Last updated: 2011.
Source: ayr-united.co.uk

=== Scottish Second Division ===
==== Matches ====
19 August 1911 Match 1	Ayr United	4–2	Abercorn	Somerset Park, Ayr

26 August 1911 Match 2	Cowdenbeath	1–2	Ayr United	North End Park, Cowdenbeath

23 September 1911 Match 3	Vale of Leven	2–3	Ayr United	Millburn Park, Alexandria

7 October 1911 Match 4	Ayr United	2–0	East Stirlingshire	Somerset Park, Ayr

21 October 1911 Match 5	Ayr United	6–0	Dundee Hibernian	Somerset Park, Ayr

4 November 1911 Match 6	Albion Rovers	0–2	Ayr United

25 November 1911 Match 7	Leith Athletic	1–3	Ayr United	Old Logie Green, Leith

2 December 1911 Match 8	Ayr United	2–1	Dumbarton	Somerset Park, Ayr

9 December 1911 Match 9	Ayr United	4–0	Vale of Leven	Somerset Park, Ayr

16 December 1911 Match 10	Dundee Hibernian	2–2	Ayr United	Tannadice Park, Dundee

23 December 1911 Match 11	Ayr United	4–2	Leith Athletic	Somerset Park, Ayr

30 December 1911 Match 12	St Johnstone	1–0	Ayr United	Recreation Grounds, Perth

1 January 1912 Match 13	Ayr United	3–2	St Bernard's	Somerset Park, Ayr

6 January 1912 Match 14	Ayr United	3–0	Arthurlie	Somerset Park, Ayr

13 January 1912 Match 15	Abercorn	0–1	Ayr United	New Ralston Park

20 January 1912 Match 16	Ayr United	1–1	St Johnstone	Somerset Park, Ayr

3 February 1912 Match 17	Arthurlie	0–1	Ayr United	Dunterlie Park, Barrhead

10 February 1912 Match 18	Dumbarton	6–1	Ayr United	Boghead Park, Dumbarton

17 February 1912 Match 19	Ayr United	4–0	Albion Rovers	Somerset Park, Ayr

16 March 1912 Match 20	East Stirlingshire	1–0	Ayr United	Merchiston Park, Bainsford

30 March 1912 Match 21	St Bernard's	2–2	Ayr United	Edinburgh

13 April 1912 Match 22	Ayr United	4–0	Cowdenbeath	Somerset Park, Ayr

Last updated: 2011.
Source: ayr-united.co.uk

=== Scottish Qualifying Cup ===
2 September 1911 1st Round	Dumfries	1–1	Ayr United	Maryfield, Dumfries

9 September 1911 1st Round (replay)	Ayr United	5–1	Dumfries	Somerset Park, Ayr

16 September 1911 2nd Round	Ayr United	10–0	Whithorn	Somerset Park, Ayr

30 September 1911 3rd Round	Ayr United	7–2	Thornhill	Somerset Park, Ayr

14 October 1911 4th Round	Beith	0–1	Ayr United	Glebe Park, Beith

28 October 1911 5th Round	Ayr United	3–2	Stenhousemuir	Somerset Park, Ayr

18 November 1911 Semi-Final	Dumbarton	4–1	Ayr United	Boghead Park, Dumbarton

Last updated: 2011.
Source: ayr-united.co.uk

=== Scottish Cup ===
27 January 1912 1st Round	Leith Athletic	3–0	Ayr United	Old Logie Green, Edinburgh

Last updated: 2011.
Source: ayr-united.co.uk

=== Ayrshire Cup ===
9 March 1912 2nd Round	Galston	0–1	Ayr United	Portland Park, Galston

6 April 1912 Semi Final	Ayr United	7–0	Girvan Athletic	Somerset Park, Ayr

27 April 1912 Final	Ayr United	2–0	Hurlford United	Somerset Park, Ayr

Last updated: 2011.
Source: ayr-united.co.uk

=== Ayr Charity Cup ===
4 May 1912 Semi Final	Ayr United	3–0	Galston	Somerset Park, Ayr

11 May 1912 Final	Ayr United	2–0	Annbank United	Somerset Park, Ayr

Last updated: 2011.
Source: ayr-united.co.uk

== Statistics ==
=== League table ===
Pos	Team	Pld	W	D	L	GF	GA	GD	Pts
1	Ayr United (C)	22	16	3	3	54	24	+30	35
2	Abercorn	22	13	4	5	43	22	+21	30
3	Dumbarton	22	13	1	8	47	31	+16	27
4	Cowdenbeath	22	12	2	8	39	31	+8	26
5	St Johnstone	22	10	4	8	29	27	+2	24

Source: statto.com
Rules for classification: Teams finish equal if level on points. Points system: 2 points for a win, 1 point for a draw, 0 points for a loss
(C) Champions

==== Results by round ====
Round	1	2	3	4	5	6	7	8	9	10	11	12	13	14	15	16	17	18	19	20	21	22
Ground	H	A	A	H	H	A	A	H	H	A	H	A	H	H	A	H	A	A	H	A	A	H
Result	W	W	W	W	W	W	W	W	W	D	W	L	W	W	W	D	W	L	W	L	D	W
Position	1	1	3	2	2	1	1	1	1	1	1	1	1	1	1	1	1	1	1	1	1	1

Updated to match(es) played on 26 August 2011. Source: Statto.com
A = Away; H = Home; W = Win; D = Draw; L = Loss
