= St Mirren Park =

Football stadium in Paisley, Scotland

The Marbill Coaches Stadium
- Greenhill Road
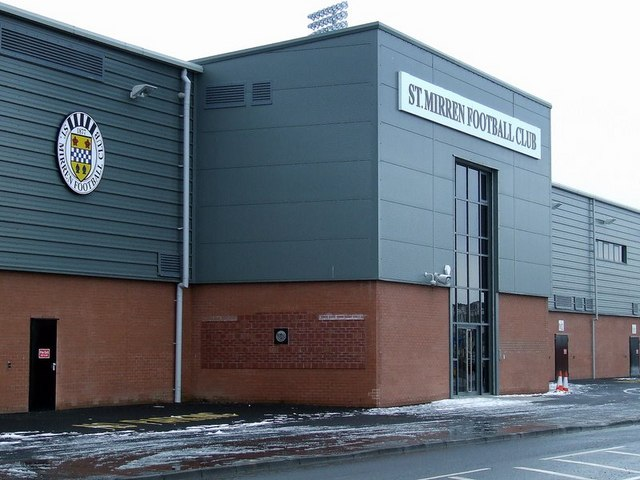
- View of the Main Stand facade

- Location in Renfrewshire
- Location: Greenhill Road, Paisley
- Coordinates: 55°51′2″N 4°26′38″W
- Owner: St Mirren F.C.
- Operator: St Mirren F.C.
- Capacity: 7,937
- Surface: Grass
- Scoreboard: Yes
- Record attendance: 7,937 - St Mirren v Kilmarnock (22 April 2023)
- Field size: 105m x 68m (115y x 74y)
- Acreage: 12.5
- Public transit: Paisley St James

Construction
- Groundbreaking: 7 January 2008
- Opened: 31 January 2009; 17 years ago
- Cost: £8 million
- Architect: Barr Construction
- Main contractor: Barr Construction

Tenants
- St Mirren F.C. (2009–); Scotland under-21 (2011–)

St Mirren Park, also known as The Marbill Coaches Stadium for sponsorship reasons, is a football stadium in Paisley, Scotland. It is the home of St Mirren F.C. The stadium is the sixth home of the club and replaced Love Street.

== History ==
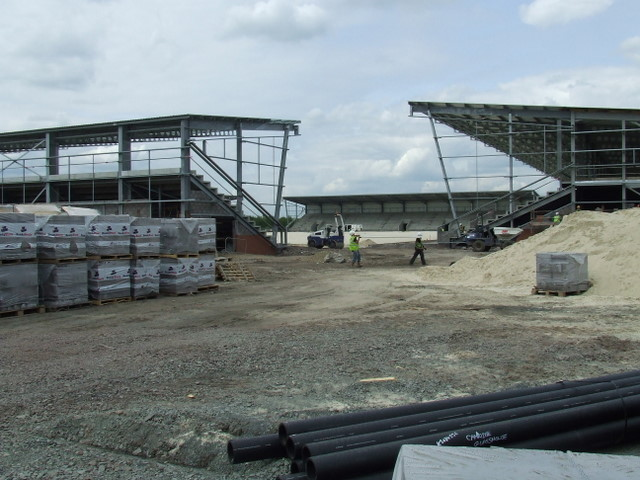
View of the stadium during construction

Talks over a new stadium began on 15 January 2003, when the club met representatives from Aldi and Lidl. The club were looking to sell their ground at Love Street for retail development. Selling Love Street would secure the necessary funding to build the new stadium. Planning applications for a retail development at Love Street were passed on 24 May 2005 and the club subsequently sold the ground to Tesco on 25 April 2007 for £15 million. The new stadium site broke ground on 7 January 2008 and was officially opened on 31 January 2009 at a cost of £8 million. Before the first game at the new stadium there was a parade from Love Street to Greenhill Road to celebrate the opening of the stadium. Club chairman Stewart Gilmour and First Minister Alex Salmond were also present at the first match at the new ground. Alex Salmond unveiled a plaque before the game to commemorate the opening. The game between St Mirren and Kilmarnock finished in a 1–1 draw, with the first goal at the new stadium being scored by Kilmarnock striker Kevin Kyle. Dennis Wyness scored St Mirren's first goal at the new ground, in the same match. The opening match set the record attendance of 7,542, and was only surpassed in the Scottish Premiership play-off match against Dundee United, when 7,732 fans attended on 26 May 2019. St Mirren Park has also become the regular home of the Scotland national under-21 football team.

In November 2015, St Mirren agreed a two-year sponsorship deal with Renfrewshire Council to rename the stadium as the Paisley 2021 Stadium. This was to promote Paisley's bid to become a UK City of Culture in 2021. In June 2018, the stadium was renamed as The Simple Digital Arena as part of a four-year deal with Glasgow-based IT firm Simple Digital Solutions.

In November 2020, the stadium was renamed The SMISA Stadium in reference to the St Mirren Independent Supporters Association. The gesture is designed to mark what will be the last season before the club becomes majority fan owned in 2021.

In July 2026, St Mirren agreed a three-year sponsorship deal with the club's official bus partners Marbill Coaches to rename the stadium as the Marbill Coaches Stadium.

== Construction ==
St Mirren Park is built on a 12.5-acre site on Greenhill Road in the Ferguslie Park area of the town. The previously unused site is less than a mile from the club's former ground. Barr Construction were responsible for the design and construction of the stadium. Their design consisted of four grandstands with a total capacity of 8,023. The East Stand is the Main Stand. The North Stand is used by away fans. Larger away supports can also be seated in a section of the West Stand. The West Stand has the largest capacity of all the stands. Whilst the South Stand is the Family Stand.

- East Stand (Greenhill Road) – capacity 2,220. (Main Stand)
- West Stand (Craigielea Drive) – capacity 2,516. (2 sections for Away Stand Overspill or small away support)
- North Stand (Ferguslie Park Avenue) – capacity 1,633. (Away Stand)
- South Stand (Drums Avenue) – capacity 1,654. (Family Stand)

Since the stadium's construction, the capacity has been reduced to 7,937.

== Facilities ==
On the outside of the stadium, promotional plaques have been constructed on the wall including fans names and loved ones. In the undercroft areas under each of the home support sections, large plaques dedicated to the members of the club's 'Hall of fame' have been erected by members of the supporters association and the website team, detailing player profiles and stats. Also, a 7-a-side pitch behind the North Stand is covered by the Airdome and can be hired by the public.

== Transport ==
Paisley St James Railway Station, which is served by trains on the Inverclyde Line from Glasgow Central, is adjacent to St Mirren Park. Since the stadium opened, some supporters campaigned for the local transport authorities to rename the station to Paisley St Mirren. Following station improvements, the signage of the station was updated to read as "Paisley St James, alight here for St Mirren Park", as a compromise between supporter groups and the local transport regulators SPT. Paisley Gilmour Street is a 15-minute walk from St Mirren Park, but has a much more frequent service from Glasgow Central. The ground is very near to the M8 Motorway and is accessed via junction 29. Fans travelling from North Ayrshire can also access the ground via the A737 road. There is a car park at the stadium for permit holders, and street parking is also available.

== See also ==
- Stadium relocations in Scottish football
