= Colchester Community Stadium =

Football stadium in Colchester, England

JobServe Community Stadium
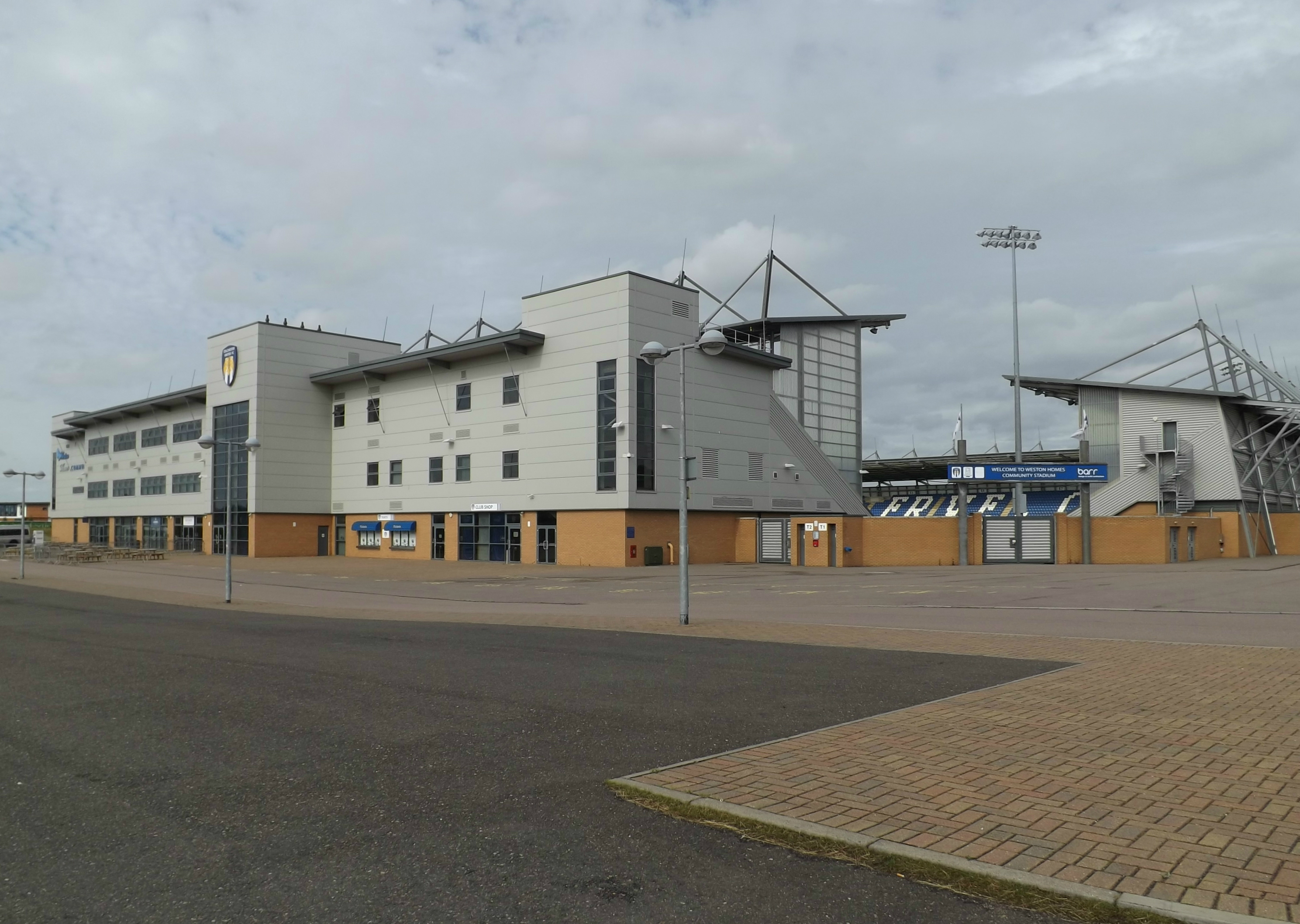
- Interactive map of JobServe Community Stadium
- Former names: Weston Homes Community Stadium
- Address: Colchester; England
- Location: United Way, Myland, Essex, England
- Coordinates: 51.923°N 0.897°E
- Owner: Colchester City Council
- Operator: Colchester United F.C.
- Capacity: 10,105
- Executive suites: 24
- Surface: Seeded grass
- Record attendance: 10,064 (Colchester United vs Norwich City, 16 January 2010)
- Field size: 101 × 64 metres
- Public transit: Colchester, 2.3 miles (3.7 km)

Construction
- Groundbreaking: July 2007
- Opened: August 2008
- Cost: £ 14 million
- Architect: Barr Construction
- Structural engineer: Barr Construction
- Services engineer: Barr Construction
- Main contractor: Barr Construction

Tenants
- Colchester United F.C. (2008–present); Ipswich Town F.C. Women (2025-present)

Colchester Community Stadium, known as the JobServe Community Stadium for sponsorship reasons, is a football stadium in Myland, England. It is the home of Colchester United Football Club. It has a capacity of 10,105 and opened in August 2008 in time for the 2008–09 season.

The stadium is the largest entertainment venue in Essex, hosting regular conferences, shows, and events, including open-air concerts, with a capacity of 20,000 for such events.

A stadium working party was first set up by Colchester Borough Council in 1976 in order to assess the feasibility and possible location for a new stadium for Colchester United. After 30 years of discussions and various site suggestions, a location in the north of Colchester called Cuckoo Farm on land owned by Colchester Borough Council was settled on. Detailed planning permission was fully granted in June 2007 on the stadium which would cost £14 million, replacing the club's Layer Road ground, which had been their home since Colchester United's foundation in 1937. Work began in July 2007 and construction was completed in August 2008 ahead of Colchester United's first match at the stadium.

After ten years of sponsorship, it was announced that the naming rights would switch from Weston Homes to JobServe in another ten-year deal. The stadium would now be known as the JobServe Community Stadium.

On 23 June 2025, Ipswich Town announced that Ipswich Women will play home games the JobServe Community Stadium for the next two seasons. The agreement will also see Ipswich Under-21s play a number of games at the venue.

== History ==
=== Origin ===
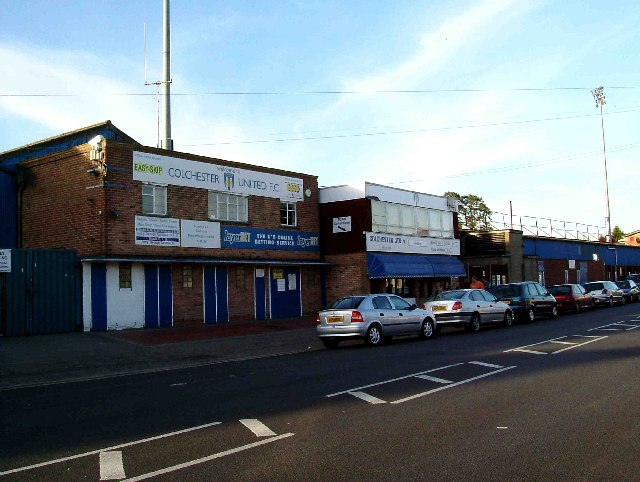
Colchester United's former Layer Road ground in October 2005

Colchester United's previous ground, Layer Road, was built in 1910, homing United's predecessors Colchester Town. Town were an amateur club and were wound down in 1937 to begin a professional club for Colchester that would be known Colchester United, as the new club moved into Town's Layer Road ground. With an ageing stadium, throughout the 1970s to the mid-2000s, Colchester United and Colchester Borough Council had been looking to re-home the club. Attention was first brought to the idea of relocation during the 1970s, when club chairman Maurice Cadman announced that Layer Road required £280,000 of basic improvements to meet the required safety legislation of the time. When the ground was purchased from the Council in 1971, a covenant was placed on Layer Road that the site could not be sold to be developed as housing. Potential resolutions for the problem included moving the pitch and building a new main stand, but proved to be too expensive for the club's ailing finances. The plans would have created an 'adequately' sized stadium with an 18,000 capacity, though the season ended with an average of just 3,818 in attendance.

In 1976, Colchester Borough Council set up a stadium working party to work towards solutions, locations and study the feasibility for a new stadium for the town. During the 1980–81 season, plans were submitted for an all-seater stadium at the Avenue of Remembrance, Colchester. However, the club ended the season 22nd out of 24 in the Third Division table and relegated to the Fourth Division, with an average gate of just 2,641 and a new all-time lowest attendance of 1,430. The stadium plan was rejected by the council on the grounds of the covenant restrictions.

In the wake of the Bradford City stadium fire on 11 May 1985 which left 56 people dead, owing to the stadium's antiquated wooden structure, it became of utmost importance to accelerate Colchester United's move from the timber-constructed Layer Road stands to a new stadium. Just 18 days later, the Heysel Stadium disaster occurred, leading to 39 deaths and hundreds of injuries. Layer Road faced £500,000 of safety improvements, but with no money, the club closed sections of the ground which reduced capacity to 4,900. A new location for a replacement stadium was mooted at Turner Rise, Colchester, as new owner and chairman Jonathan Crisp introduced developers Norcross Estates as shirt sponsors for the 1987–88 season. Crisp considered selling Layer Road and ground-sharing Portman Road with neighbours and rivals Ipswich Town whilst the Turner Rise stadium was constructed. However, the plans were delayed and eventually scrapped, with Crisp's plan to ground-share swayed by a group of Colchester United's former directors. A later plan to build a stadium at Wick Lane, Ardleigh saw plans thrown out as Colchester were relegated from the Football League for the first time in 40 years.

Layer Road was sold back to the Council for £1.2 million in the early 1990s in order to clear Colchester United's debts, with the club leasing the stadium for three years. Following this, the Football League required all clubs to have a minimum lease of ten years on all stadia, to which the Council extended the arrangement. Meanwhile, the Borough Council also determined ten potential sites for a new stadium to be contracted, with each examined. With the lease on Layer Road due to expire in 2002, Kirklees McAlpine were commissioned as consultants for a new stadium in 1998. A preferred site at Cuckoo Farm was identified, with additional benefit being that the land was already owned by the Council.

=== Planning ===
With a site now chosen, plans were submitted in April 1999 which would include an earmarked 30-acre site, ten acres of which would accommodate car parking and a park and ride system, and a further ten for commercial use, including hotels and leisure facilities. The application was submitted simultaneously with plans for a new major junction (junction 28) on the A12. Outline planning consent was approved in July 2003, including approval for 1,500 homes, a police station and a primary school.

With the Community Stadium Now! petition set up by Colchester's Evening Gazette newspaper and with 13,000 signatures in support, the Cuckoo Farm plans were submitted to Deputy Prime Minister John Prescott for a decision to be made on the application. Prescott gave his approval for the regeneration project for the north of Colchester in January 2005, meaning construction work could begin as early as 2006 after planning application had been submitted in autumn 2005.

On 13 November 2006, Colchester United chief executive Marie Partner announced to United fans gathered at Colchester's Moot Hall that the stadium had received the go-ahead after clearing a major hurdle. The Council had backed the £14.23 million stadium by taking out a £10.23 million loan. At this point, the petition had also gathered over 30,000 signatures. The remaining £4 million came in the form of grants from the Football Foundation and local government and development agencies. More good news followed with the announcement by Colchester Councillors that work could begin on the stadium prior to the opening of a new access route linked to the A12 in January 2007. Scottish firm Barr Construction were then announced as contractors for the new stadium just two weeks later.

=== Construction and opening ===
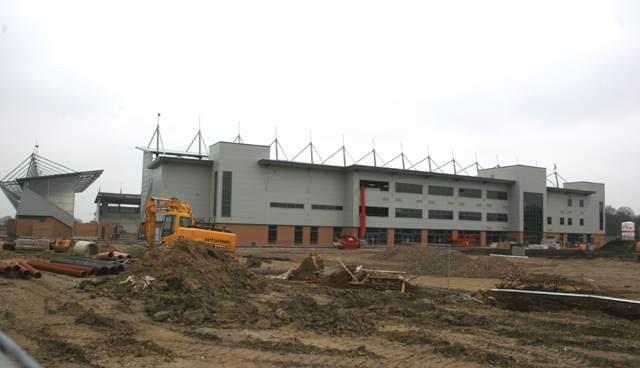
Colchester Community Stadium under construction in April 2008

Work began on the Cuckoo Farm site in June 2007, with temporary buildings and construction vehicles arriving on site from 4 June. Building work finally began in July 2007 with the intention of completion in time for the beginning of the 2008–09 season. With building work nearing completion, Colchester announced the name for the stadium would officially be the Colchester Community Stadium, but owing to a deal with building firm Weston Homes, the ground would be known as the Weston Homes Community Stadium. The ten-year sponsorship deal would be worth up to £2 million and would also include shirt sponsorship for the 2008–09 season.

The first fixture to be played at the Community Stadium was a friendly between Colchester United and Spanish club Athletic Bilbao, on 4 August 2008. The first goal to be scored at the stadium was from Aritz Aduriz for Bilbao after 15 minutes, but Colchester forward Scott Vernon equalised from the penalty spot on 32 minutes, registering the first Colchester goal at the Community Stadium. The game finished 2–1 to the Spanish club.

The first competitive fixture at the Community Stadium came on 16 August 2008 when Colchester hosted Huddersfield Town in front of a crowd of 5,340. Mark Yeates scored the first competitive goal at the stadium in a 2–2 draw with Oldham Athletic on 30 August 2008 but the U's had to wait until 25 October 2008 to register their first win at the ground. They won emphatically against Carlisle United, scoring five with goals from David Perkins, Dean Hammond, Akanni-Sunday Wasiu and two netted by Mark Yeates.

== Structure and facilities ==
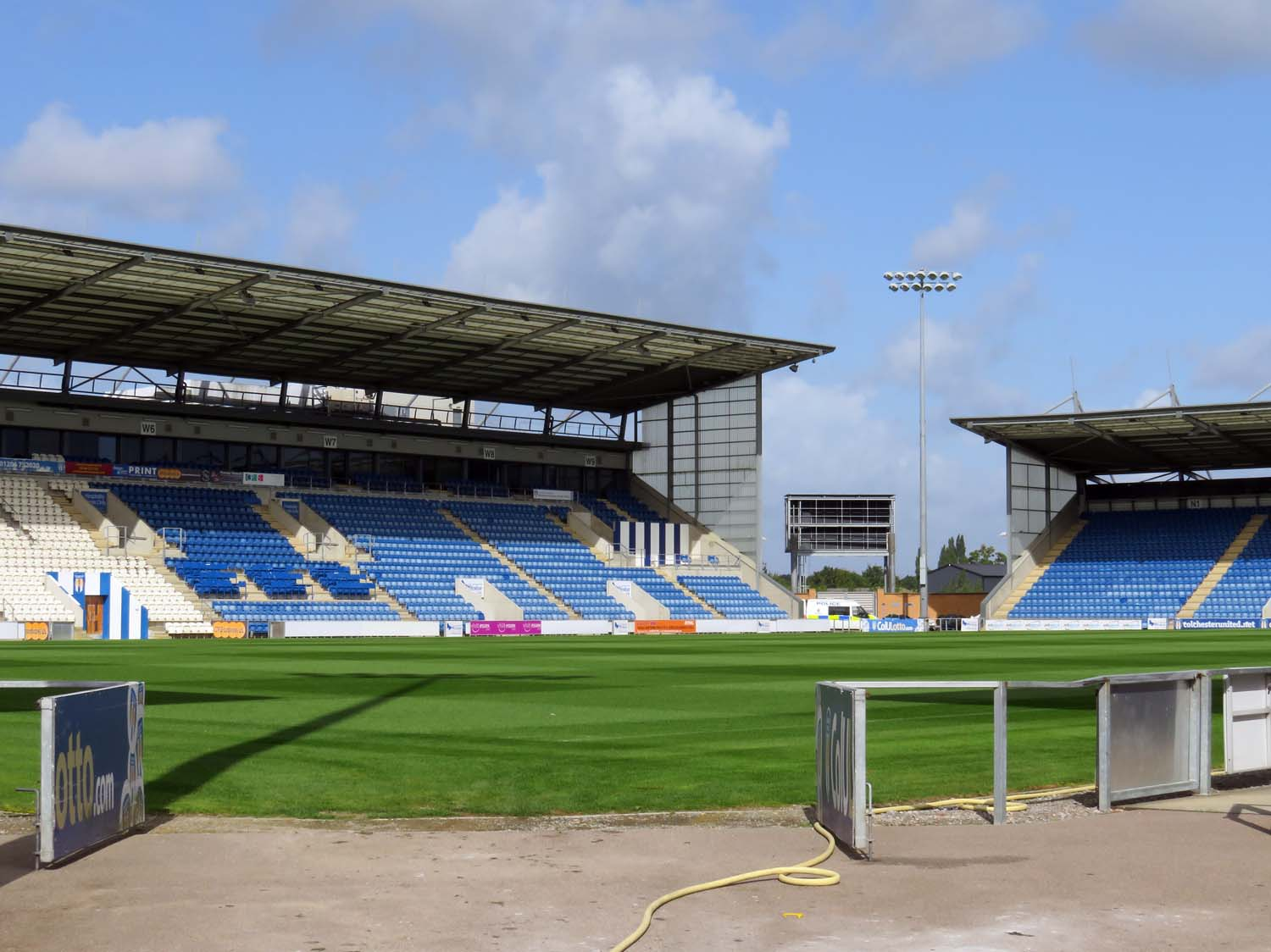
Interior

With a seating capacity of 10,105, the stadium is divided into four stands, with each stand incorporating disabled access. The West Stand is the largest stand which contains both conventional seating for supporters, but also houses 24 executive boxes and corporate areas. These areas can hold up to 400 diners in the Layer and Centennial suites. Directors boxes are situated either side of the tunnel entrance with dugouts and press areas also separated by the tunnel. A television gantry is placed on the roof of the stand above the executive boxes. Housed in the West Stand are the club's administration offices, club shop, ticket office and reception.

The North Stand is designated for away supporters for Football League fixtures.

The East Stand is home to the family area which offers family-friendly pricing for supporters choosing to be situated there.

The South Stand houses Colchester United's vocal supporters, where up to 1,844 fans can sit. This stand also uses pricing incentives to encourage supporters to create a loud and vocal atmosphere.

== Other uses ==
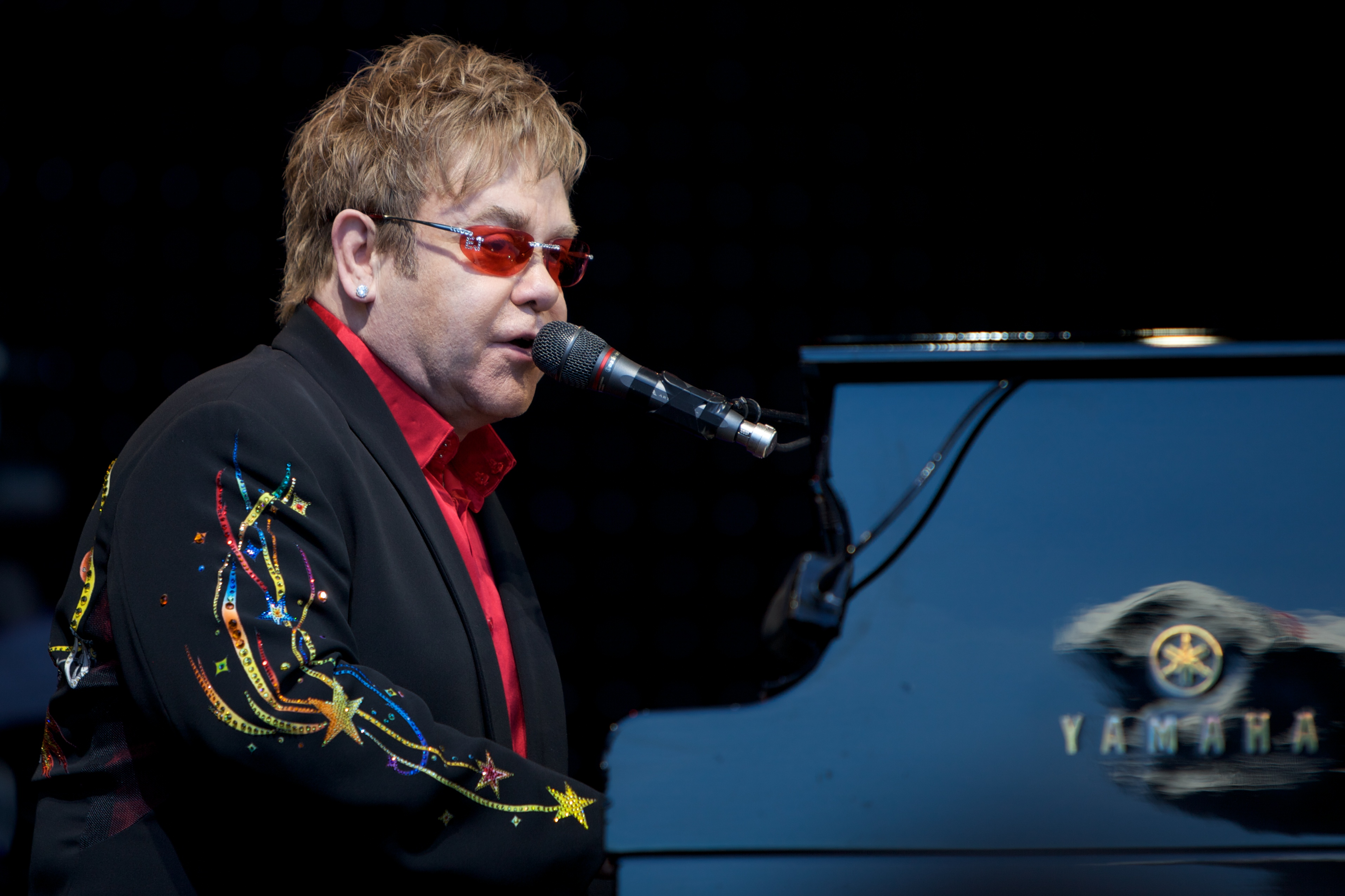
Elton John became the first artist to play an open-air gig at Colchester Community Stadium in June 2014.

Utilising the space of the Layer and Centennial suites, the stadium also plays host to a range of other activities, including conferences, banqueting, weddings, parties and events. The stadium features a 600 space car park and hosts boxing dinners, darts opens, comedy nights, tribute band nights, fashion shows, award ceremonies and proms.

The stadium is also used as an open-air music venue, having a capacity of 20,000 for these events. The first of which took place on 29 June 2014 when Sir Elton John played his first ever Colchester concert, to a crowd of 16,500. Lionel Richie also performed in an open-air setting in June 2016 as part of his All The Hits tour. An audience of 17,000 watched local singer Olly Murs perform on 10 June 2017 in the stadiums third open-air concert. This was followed by girl group Little Mix making their Colchester debut on 8 July 2018 as part of their popular Summer Hits tour.

=== International football matches ===
The Community Stadium has hosted six international men's football matches; three featuring the England under-21s, two featuring the England under-20s and one England under-19 game. The first international game at the stadium saw England under-19s defeat their German counterparts 1–0 in front of a crowd of 9,692 on 18 November 2008 courtesy of a Henri Lansbury goal. The next international fixture saw England under-21s qualify for the 2011 UEFA European Under-21 Football Championship as they beat Lithuania 3–0 with two goals from Danny Welbeck and one from Marc Albrighton. A crowd of 7,240 watched the game on 7 September 2010. The England under-21s returned to Colchester for a 2013 UEFA European Under-21 Championship qualifier on 11 November 2011. The Young Lions cruised to a 5–0 victory against Iceland on the night, with goals from Marvin Sordell, Martin Kelly, Craig Dawson and two scored by Gary Gardner. The attendance for the game was 10,051. England won their fourth match after almost five years away from the Community Stadium on 6 September 2016. Full England international Marcus Rashford made his England under-21 debut in the game, scoring a hat-trick as England scored six times against Norway. The other scorers were Nathaniel Chalobah, Ruben Loftus-Cheek and Lewis Baker. England's opposition scored for the first time at the Community Stadium when Ghayas Zahid scored Norway's consolation with the score at 4–1.

The stadium hosted the England women's team for the first time in a competitive fixture for their 2019 FIFA Women's World Cup qualification game against Kazakhstan on 28 November 2017. The Lionesses won 5–0 on the night with goals from Melissa Lawley, Fran Kirby, two from Nikita Parris, and Izzy Christiansen. The England women's team had previously played a friendly at the stadium in a 2–0 loss against Iceland women's team on 16 July 2009.

18 November 2008	England U19	1–0	Germany U19	Colchester
	Lansbury	Report		Stadium: Colchester Community Stadium; Attendance: 9,692

16 July 2009	England Women	0–2	Iceland Women	Colchester
		Report	Magnúsdóttir 26'; Viðarsdóttir 81'	Stadium: Colchester Community Stadium; Attendance: 4,170

7 September 2010	England U21	3–0	Lithuania U21	Colchester
16:00 BST	Welbeck 61', 90'; Albrighton 79'	Report		Stadium: Colchester Community Stadium; Attendance: 7,240; Referee: Matej Jug (Slovenia)

11 November 2011	England U21	5–0	Iceland U21	Colchester
19:30 GMT	Sordell 40'; Kelly 58'; Dawson 86'; Gardner 90', 90+2'	Report		Stadium: Colchester Community Stadium; Attendance: 10,051; Referee: Pavle Radavanović (Montenegro)

6 September 2016	England U21	6–1	Norway U21	Colchester
17:45 BST	Rashford 29', 66', 72' (pen.); Chalobah 37'; Loftus-Cheek 64'; Baker 86'	Report	Zahid 68'	Stadium: Colchester Community Stadium; Attendance: 8,454; Referee: Ali Palabıyık (Turkey)

28 November 2017	England Women	5–0	Kazakhstan Women	Colchester
19:05 GMT	Lawley 15'; Kirby 64' (pen.); Parris 68', 75'; Christiansen 76'	Report; Report; Report		Stadium: Colchester Community Stadium; Attendance: 9,644; Referee: Lois Otte (Belgium)

19 November 2018	England U20	2–0	Germany U20	Colchester
	Willock 66'; Nmecha 69'	Report		Stadium: Colchester Community Stadium; Attendance: 7,648; Referee: Pawel Pskit (Poland)

29 March 2022	England U20	3–1	Germany U20	Colchester
19:30	Greenwood 10'; McAtee 52'; Dolan 62'	Report	Samardžić 87'	Stadium: Colchester Community Stadium; Attendance: 8,437; Referee: Sam Purkiss (England)

== Records ==
The highest attendance at the Community Stadium is 10,064 when Colchester United hosted Norwich City on 16 January 2010. Canaries manager Paul Lambert had been in charge at Colchester when the U's defeated Norwich 7–1 on the opening day of the season at Carrow Road. Shortly after this event, Lambert defected to Norwich, and with bad feelings between the clubs spelt a fiery affair for the return fixture. Substitute Ian Henderson was sent off on his home debut for Colchester as they were handed a heavy 5–0 defeat by Norwich.

== Transport ==
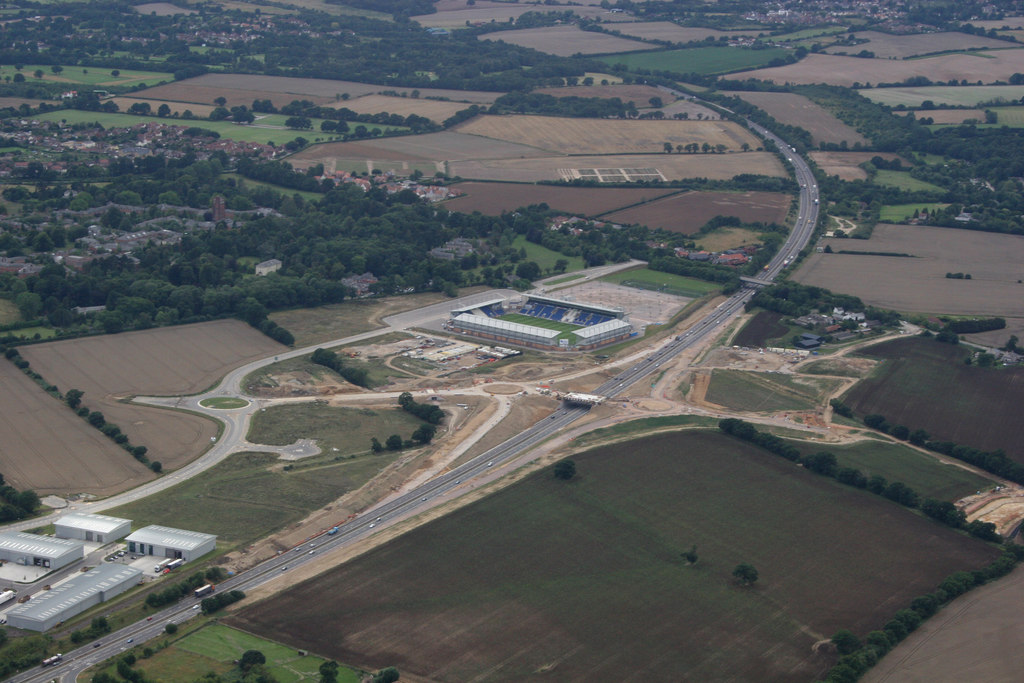
Colchester Community Stadium and junction 28 on the A12 road under construction in August 2010

The Colchester Community Stadium is situated close to junction 28 on the A12. The stadium can hold just under 700 cars in the main car park, and there are two drop off zones situated around the stadium. A park and ride situated on the opposite side of the A12 opened in 2015, in which supporters are able to park on match days.

== Awards ==
In May 2009, the Colchester Community Stadium was named overall winner in the Royal Institution of Chartered Surveyors East of England Awards. The RICS said the stadium project had been a "fantastic new facility for Colchester United Football Club" and that it also gave "benefits to the wider community". The stadium also won the community benefit award.

== See also ==
- Football in England
- Lists of stadiums
