= 1910–11 Ayr United F.C. season =

Ayr United
1910–11 season
- Second Division: 2nd
Home colours

The 1910–11 season is the first season of competitive football by Ayr United F.C., following a merger of Ayr Parkhouse F.C. and Ayr F.C.

== Overview ==
Prior to 1910 there were two clubs in Ayr, Ayr F.C. and Ayr Parkhouse. Talk of merger had been rife in Ayr for year before the clubs finally agreed to do so in 1910. The newly formed Ayr United sought election to the Scottish First Division, the assumption that this status would be granted was the main incentive which pushed the merger through. The new club's home ground was Somerset Park, originally the home of Ayr FC from 1888, although Parkhouse’s former home, Beresford Park, remained in use by the club for reserve and local fixtures until the mid-1920s. The new Ayr United F.C. played in a strip consisting of a crimson and gold hooped jerseys (Ayr F.C.) and navy blue shorts (Ayr Parkhouse).

== Competitions ==
Win Draw Loss

=== Preseason ===
17 August 1910 Friendly	Ayr United (Scotland)	4–1	(Scotland) Hurlford	Somerset Park, Ayr

=== Scottish League Division Two ===
==== League table ====
Pos	Team	Pld	W	D	L	GF	GA	GD	Pts
1	Dumbarton (C)	22	15	1	6	52	30	+22	31
2	Ayr United	22	12	3	7	54	36	+18	27
3	Albion Rovers	22	10	5	7	26	21	+5	25
4	Leith Athletic	22	9	6	7	42	43	−1	24
5	Cowdenbeath	22	9	5	8	31	27	+4	23

Source: statto.com
Rules for classification: Teams finish equal if level on points. Points system: 2 points for a win, 1 point for a draw, 0 points for a loss
(C) Champions

==== Results summary ====
Overall								Home						Away					
Pld	W	D	L	GF	GA	GD	Pts	W	D	L	GF	GA	GD	W	D	L	GF	GA	GD
22	12	3	7	54	36	+18	39	8	1	2	33	11	+22	4	2	5	21	25	−4

==== Matches ====
20 August 1910	Ayr United	2–0	Port Glasgow Athletic	Somerset Park, Ayr

27 August 1910	Leith Athletic	4–6	Ayr United

3 September 1910	Ayr United	2–2	Vale of Leven	Somerset Park, Ayr

24 September 1910	East Stirlingshire	2–0	Ayr United

1 October 1910	Port Glasgow Athletic	1–0	Ayr United

8 October 1910	Ayr United	2–0	Arthurlie	Somerset Park, Ayr

15 October 1910	Abercorn	3–3	Ayr United

22 October 1910	Ayr United	3–0	Cowdenbeath	Somerset Park, Ayr

29 October 1910	Ayr United	1–2	Albion Rovers	Somerset Park, Ayr

5 November 1910	Dumbarton	3–2	Ayr United

12 November 1910	Ayr United	3–0	Dundee Hibernian	Somerset Park, Ayr

19 November 1910	Cowdenbeath	5–1	Ayr United

26 November 1910	Ayr United	3–4	Abercorn	Somerset Park, Ayr

3 December 1910	Dundee Hibernian	1–1	Ayr United

10 December 1910	Ayr United	5–1	St Bernard's	Somerset Park, Ayr

17 December 1910	Ayr United	4–0	East Stirlingshire	Somerset Park, Ayr

24 December 1910	Vale of Leven	0–1	Ayr United

7 January 1911	St Bernard's	4–1	Ayr United

1 April 1911	Ayr United	5–1	Dumbarton	Somerset Park, Ayr

8 April 1911	Arthurlie	1–4	Ayr United

=== Scottish Qualifying Cup ===
==== First round ====
3 September 1910 Scot Qualifying Cup 1st Rnd	Ayr United	2–0	Dumfries	Somerset Park, Ayr

==== Second round ====
17 September 1910 Scot Qualifying Cup 2nd Rnd	Galston	2–1	Ayr United

=== Scottish Consolation Cup ===
==== First round ====
14 January 1911 Scot Consolation Cup 1st Rnd	Ayr United	5–0	Mid Annandale	Somerset Park, Ayr

==== Second round ====
28 January 1911 Scot Consolation Cup 2nd Rnd	Ayr United	7–1	Girvan Athletic	Somerset Park, Ayr

==== Third round ====
4 February 1911 Scot Consolation Cup 3rd Rnd	Ayr United	2–0	Beith	Somerset Park, Ayr

==== Fourth round ====
18 February 1911 Scot Consolation Cup 4th Rnd	Ayr United	1–0	Dumbarton Harp	Somerset Park, Ayr

==== Fifth round ====
4 March 1911 Scot Consolation Cup 5th Rnd	Ayr United	3–1	Stenhousemuir	Somerset Park, Ayr

==== Semi-final ====
18 March 1911 Scot Consolation Cup S/F	St Johnstone	1–0	Ayr United

=== Ayrshire League ===
==== 1909–10 Final ====
14 September 1910 Ayrshire League Final	Ayr United	4–4	Kilmarnock	Somerset Park, Ayr

==== 1910–11 Matches ====
2 January 1911 Ayrshire League	Ayr United	5–1	Galston	Somerset Park, Ayr

21 January 1911 Ayrshire League	Galston	0–3	Ayr United

17 April 1911 Ayrshire League	Ayr United	4–0	Kilmarnock	Somerset Park, Ayr

24 April 1911 Ayrshire League	Kilmarnock	4–2	Ayr United

==== 1910–11 Final ====
29 April 1911 Ayrshire League Final	Ayr United	1–0	Kilmarnock	Somerset Park, Ayr

=== Ayrshire Cup ===
==== Second round ====
25 February 1911 Ayrshire Cup round 2	Ayr United	1–1	Beith	Somerset Park, Ayr

11 March 1911 Ayrshire Cup round 2 (replay)	Beith	1–3 (aet)	Ayr United

==== Semi-final ====
15 April 1911 Ayrshire Cup Semi-final	Girvan Athletic	0–4	Ayr United

==== Final ====
22 April 1911 Ayrshire Cup Final	Hurlford	3–2	Ayr United

== See also ==
- 1910–11 in Scottish football
- 1910–11 Scottish Division Two
