= 2000–01 Ayr United F.C. season =

Ayr United
2000–01 season
- Chairman: Bill Barr
- Manager: Gordon Dalziel
- Stadium: Somerset Park
- Scottish First Division: Runners-Up
- Scottish Cup: Third Round, lost to Inverness CT
- League Cup: First Round, lost to Dumbarton
- Scottish Challenge Cup: First Round, lost to Brechin City
Home colours	Away colours

The 2000–01 season is the 91st season of competitive football by Ayr United.

== Competitions ==
Win Draw Loss

=== Preseason ===
18 July 2000 Friendly	Vasalunds IF	0–3	Ayr United	Skytteholms IP, Stockholm

19 July 2000 Friendly	IK Sirius	0–3	Ayr United	Studenternas IP, Uppsala
				Attendance: 254

21 July 2000 Friendly	Sandvikens IF	0–2	Ayr United	Jernvallen, Sandviken
				Attendance: 225

23 July 2000 Friendly	Gefle IF	1–0	Ayr United	Strömvallen, Gävle
				Attendance: 311

26 July 2000 Friendly	Albion Rovers	0–5	Ayr United	Cliftonhill, Coatbridge
				Attendance: 250

30 July 2000 Friendly	Ayr United	5–1	Chesterfield	Somerset Park, Ayr
				Attendance: 1,447

=== Scottish First Division ===
==== Matches ====
5 August 2000 Match 1	Ayr United	1–0	Ross County	Somerset Park, Ayr
	Eddie Annand	BBC Sport		Attendance: 2,740; Referee: George Clyde

12 August 2000 Match 2	Alloa Athletic	1–1	Ayr United	Recreation Park, Alloa
	Willie Irvine 34'	BBC Sport	66' Eddie Annand	Attendance: 1,274; Referee: Eric Martindale

19 August 2000 Match 3	Ayr United	3–1	Airdrieonians	Somerset Park, Ayr
	John Bradford 56'; Pat McGinlay 73', 81'	BBC Sport	Martin Prest	Attendance: 2,705

26 August 2000 Match 4	Ayr United	5–2	Falkirk	Somerset Park, Ayr
		BBC Sport		Attendance: 3,213

9 September 2000 Match 5	Livingston	2–0	Ayr United	Almondvale Stadium, Livingston
		BBC Sport		Attendance: 5,226

16 September 2000 Match 6	Greenock Morton	1–1	Ayr United	Cappielow Park, Greenock
		BBC Sport		Attendance: 1,308

23 September 2000 Match 7	Ayr United	2–1	Clyde	Somerset Park, Ayr
		BBC Sport		Attendance: 2,715; Referee: E. Martindale

30 September 2000 Match 8	Ayr United	3–3	Inverness CT	Somerset Park, Ayr
				Attendance: 2,070

7 October 2000 Match 9	Raith Rovers	1–3	Ayr United	Stark's Park, Kirkcaldy
		BBC Sport		Attendance: 1,858; Referee: S. Dougal

14 October 2000 Match 10	Ross County	1–1	Ayr United	Victoria Park, Dingwall
		BBC Report		Attendance: 2,567; Referee: Ian Fyfe

21 October 2000 Match 11	Ayr United	3–1	Alloa Athletic	Somerset Park, Ayr
		BBC Report		Attendance: 2,183; Referee: K. Clark

28 October 2000 Match 12	Falkirk	3–0	Ayr United	Brockville Park, Falkirk
		BBC Report		Attendance: 3,783; Referee: Craig MacKay

4 November 2000 Match 13	Ayr United	1–1	Livingston	Somerset Park, Ayr
		BBC Sport		Attendance: 3,082; Referee: Kevin Toner

11 November 2000 Match 14	Clyde	0–1	Ayr United	Broadwood Stadium, Cumbernauld
		BBC Sport		Attendance: 1,318; Referee: J. Fleming

18 November 2000 Match 15	Ayr United	1–1	Greenock Morton	Somerset Park, Ayr
		BBC Sport		Attendance: 2,256; Referee: B. McGarry

25 November 2000 Match 16	Ayr United	4–2	Raith Rovers	Somerset Park, Ayr
		BBC Sport		Attendance: 2,212; Referee: J. Underhill

2 December 2000 Match 17	Inverness CT	7–3	Ayr United	Caledonian Stadium, Inverness
		BBC Sport		Attendance: 1,513; Referee: G. Mitchell

9 December 2000 Match 18	Airdrieonians	0–0	Ayr United	Excelsior Stadium, Airdrie
15:00		BBC Sport		Attendance: 1,572; Referee: J. Rowbotham

16 December 2000 Match 19	Ayr United	0–2	Ross County	Somerset Park, Ayr
15:00		BBC Sport		Attendance: 2,007; Referee: K. Clark

2 January 2001 Match 20	Greenock Morton	0–6	Ayr United	Cappielow Park, Greenock
15:00		BBC Sport		Attendance: 2,866; Referee: John Fleming

6 January 2001 Match 21	Ayr United	2–0	Clyde	Somerset Park, Ayr
15:00		BBC Sport		Attendance: 2,481; Referee: R. Orr

13 January 2001 Match 22	Ayr United	1–1	Inverness CT	Somerset Park, Ayr
15:00		BBC Sport		Attendance: 2,534; Referee: D. McDonald

3 February 2001 Match 23	Ayr United	2–2	Airdrieonians	Somerset Park, Ayr
15:00		BBC Sport		Attendance: 2,060; Referee: T. Brown

17 February 2001 Match 24	Raith Rovers	1–4	Ayr United	Stark's Park, Kirkcaldy
15:00		BBC Sport		Attendance: 1,217; Referee: G. Mitchell

24 February 2001 Match 25	Falkirk	1–2	Ayr United	Brockville Park, Falkirk
15:00		BBC Sport		Attendance: 2,668; Referee: Robert Orr

3 March 2001 Match 26	Ayr United	1–1	Livingston	Somerset Park, Ayr
15:00		BBC Sport		Attendance: 2,726; Referee: S. Dougal

6 March 2001 Match 27	Ayr United	6–0	Falkirk	Somerset Park, Ayr
		BBC Sport		Attendance: 2,041

13 March 2001 Match 28	Alloa Athletic	0–2	Ayr United	Recreation Park, Alloa
				Attendance: 539

17 March 2001 Match 29	Clyde	2–2	Ayr United	Broadwood Stadium, Cumbernauld
15:00		BBC Sport		Attendance: 1,401; Referee: C. Melville

20 March 2001 Match 30	Livingston	0–1	Ayr United	Almondvale Stadium, Livingston
		BBC Sport		Attendance: 2,731; Referee: D. Somers

31 March 2001 Match 31	Ayr United	3–0	Greenock Morton	Somerset Park, Ayr
15:00		BBC Sport		Attendance: 2,111; Referee: G. Clyde

7 April 2001 Match 32	Ayr United	2–0	Raith Rovers	Somerset Park, Ayr
15:00		BBC Sport		Attendance: 2,026; Referee: D. Somers

14 April 2001 Match 33	Inverness CT	1–0	Ayr United	Caledonian Stadium, Inverness
		BBC Sport		Attendance: 2,269; Referee: M. Ritchie

21 April 2001 Match 34	Ross County	0–1	Ayr United	Victoria Park, Dingwall
15:00		BBC Sport		Attendance: 1,942; Referee: A. Freeland

28 April 2001 Match 35	Ayr United	4–1	Alloa Athletic	Somerset Park, Ayr
15:00		BBC Sport		Attendance: 2,234; Referee: Willie Young

5 May 2001 Match 36	Airdrieonians	1–1	Ayr United	Excelsior Stadium, Airdrie
				Attendance: 1,228

Last updated: 2011.
Source: mabels-tables

=== Scottish League Cup ===
9 August 2000 Round 1	Dumbarton	0–0 (5–4 p)	Ayr United	Strathclyde Homes Stadium, Dumbarton
				Attendance: 501

Last updated: 2011.
Source: ayr-united.co.uk

=== Scottish Challenge Cup ===
15 August 2000 Round 1	Brechin City	3–1	Ayr United	Glebe Park, Brechin
				Attendance: 356

Last updated: 2011.
Source: ayr-united.co.uk

=== Scottish Cup ===
27 January 2001 Round 3	Inverness Caledonian Thistle	4–3	Ayr United	Caledonian Stadium, Inverness
				Attendance: 2,257

Last updated: 2011.
Source: ayr-united.co.uk

Last updated: 2011.
Source: ayr-united.co.uk

==== Final League table ====
Pos	Team	Pld	W	D	L	GF	GA	GD	Pts	Promotion or relegation
1	Livingston (C, P)	36	23	7	6	72	31	+41	76	Promotion to the Premier League
2	Ayr United	36	19	12	5	73	41	+32	69	
3	Falkirk	36	16	8	12	57	59	−2	56	
4	Inverness CT	36	14	12	10	71	54	+17	54	
5	Clyde	36	11	14	11	44	46	−2	47	

Source: "2000-2001 First Division - SPFL Archive". SPFL.
Rules for classification: 1) points; 2) goal difference; 3) number of goals scored.
(C) Champions; (P) Promoted

==== Results summary ====
Overall								Home						Away					
Pld	W	D	L	GF	GA	GD	Pts	W	D	L	GF	GA	GD	W	D	L	GF	GA	GD
36	19	12	5	73	41	+32	69	11	6	1	44	19	+25	8	6	4	29	22	+7

Last updated: 2011.
Source: Wikipedia article

==== Results by round ====
Round	1	2	3	4	5	6	7	8	9	10	11	12	13	14	15	16	17	18	19	20	21	22	23	24	25	26	27	28	29	30	31	32	33	34	35	36
Ground	H	A	H	H	A	A	H	H	A	A	H	A	H	A	H	H	A	A	H	A	H	H	H	A	A	H	H	A	A	A	H	H	A	A	H	A
Result	W	D	W	W	L	D	W	D	W	D	W	L	D	W	D	W	L	D	L	W	W	D	D	W	W	D	W	W	D	W	W	W	L	W	W	D
Position	5	4	3	2	2	3	2	3	3	3	3	3	3	3	3	3	3	3	3	3	2	3	3	2	2	2	2	2	2	2	1	2	2	2	2	2

Source: Statto.com
A = Away; H = Home; W = Win; D = Draw; L = Loss
