= Alex McAnespie =

Scottish footballer and manager

Personal information
- Position: Central defender

Senior career*
Years	Team	Apps	(Gls)
- Craigmark Burntonians
1964–1978	Ayr United	315	(10)
- Cumnock Juniors

Managerial career
- 1987–1996: Stranraer
- * Club domestic league appearances and goals

Alex "Sanny" McAnespie is a Scottish former professional football player and manager.

== Career ==
McAnespie, a central defender, played for Craigmark Burntonians, Ayr United and Cumnock Juniors.

After retiring from playing, McAnespie was manager of Stranraer between 1987 and 1996.

His son, Stephen McAnespie, played for Raith Rovers, Bolton Wanderers and Fulham.
