= Girvan Athletic F.C. =

Association football club in Scotland

Girvan Athletic
- Founded: 1892
- Dissolved: 1940
- Ground: Hamilton Park, Girvan
Home colours

Girvan Athletic Football Club was a Scottish football club based in the town of Girvan, South Ayrshire.

== History ==
The club was formed in 1892 and was a regular entrant to the Scottish Cup, and, after its formation in 1895, the Scottish Qualifying Cup, until the club became a Junior outfit in 1923. At this point, the club was not permitted to enter the Scottish Cup, and it played in the Ayrshire Junior League briefly.

The club's greatest honour was winning the Scottish Combination league, jointly with Nithsdale Wanderers, in 1910–11. However, the competition had more or less fallen apart during the season, and did not re-start in 1911. The club also reached the semi-final of the Ayrshire Cup for the first time, losing to Ayr United. The club had applied to join the Scottish Football Union in 1914, but the application was rejected.

The club returned to the senior ranks before the 1935–36 season, when it joined the re-formed Scottish Alliance. From 1936 to 1937 the club, now normally known as Girvan, started tto enter the Qualifying Cup once more. The only time the club reached the first round of the Cup proper was in 1938–39, and the club was unlucky to get one of the worst possible draws, being drawn away to another non-league club in Duns. The club duly lost in front of 1,500 fans paying a gate of £68; Girvan was ahead at half-time, and goalkeeper Allan saved two penalties, but Duns scored four in the second half to breeze through.

The club joined the re-formed Scottish Alliance league in 1939, but the outbreak of World War 2 forced the competition's abandonment after one match. The club did not survive the war and was replaced in the town by Girvan Amateurs.

== Colours ==
The club played in the following colours:

- 1892–1909: light blue
- 1909–12: blue and gold
- 1912–17, after 1921: black & gold
- 1917–21: black and red

== Ground ==
The club played at Hamilton Park.

== Notable players ==
- Sam Kennedy, signed for the club from Partick Thistle in 1910
