= 1913–14 Ayr United F.C. season =

Ayr United
1913–14 season
- Manager: Selection Committee
- Stadium: Somerset Park
- Scottish League Division One: 10th
Home colours

The 1913–14 season is the 4th season of competitive football by Ayr United.

== Competitions ==
Win Draw Loss

=== Friendly and benefit matches ===
1 January 1914 Friendly	Ayr United	6–4	Northern Nomads	Somerset Park, Ayr

7 February 1914 Friendly	Ayr United	4–0	Scottish Amateurs	Somerset Park, Ayr

21 February 1914 Friendly	Ayr United	4–1	St Bernard's	Somerset Park, Ayr

28 February 1914 Friendly	Ayr United	3–0	Third Lanark	Somerset Park, Ayr

29 April 1914 Friendly	Ayr United	3–4	Kilmarnock	Somerset Park, Ayr

Last updated: 2011.
Source: ayr-united.co.uk

=== Scottish First Division ===
==== Matches ====
16 August 1913 Match 1	Celtic	5–1	Ayr United	Celtic Park, Glasgow

23 August 1913 Match 2	Ayr United	0–4	Heart of Midlothian	Somerset Park, Ayr

30 August 1913 Match 3	Dundee	2–0	Ayr United	Dens Park, Dundee

1 September 1913 Match 4	Dumbarton	2–1	Ayr United	Boghead Park, Dumbarton

8 September 1913 Match 5	Falkirk	1–3	Ayr United	Brockville Park, Falkirk

13 September 1913 Match 6	Kilmarnock	0–1	Ayr United	Rugby Park, Kilmarnock

17 September 1913 Match 7	Ayr United	1–2	Dumbarton	Somerset Park, Ayr

27 September 1913 Match 8	Hamilton Academical	4–0	Ayr United	Douglas Park, Hamilton

11 October 1913 Match 9	Ayr United	2–2	Queens Park	Somerset Park, Ayr

18 October 1913 Match 10	Ayr United	4–0	Motherwell	Somerset Park, Ayr

25 October 1913 Match 11	Aberdeen	2–2	Ayr United	Pittodrie Stadium, Aberdeen

1 November 1913 Match 12	Ayr United	3–2	Falkirk	Somerset Park, Ayr

8 November 1913 Match 13	Ayr United	2–1	Partick Thistle	Somerset Park, Ayr

15 November 1913 Match 14	Raith Rovers	5–1	Ayr United	Stark's Park, Kirkcaldy

25 November 1913 Match 15	Ayr United	2–0	Clyde	Somerset Park, Ayr

29 November 1913 Match 16	Ayr United	2–0	St Mirren	Somerset Park, Ayr

6 December 1913 Match 17	Ayr United	0–2	Airdrieonians	Somerset Park, Ayr

13 December 1913 Match 18	Third Lanark	4–2	Ayr United	Cathkin Park, Glasgow

20 December 1913 Match 19	Ayr United	1–2	Hibernian	Somerset Park, Ayr

27 December 1913 Match 20	Ayr United	0–6	Celtic	Somerset Park, Ayr

3 January 1914 Match 21	Heart of Midlothian	2–1	Ayr United	Tynecastle Stadium, Edinburgh

5 January 1914 Match 22	Ayr United	0–2	Greenock Morton	Somerset Park, Ayr

10 January 1914 Match 23	Ayr United	1–2	Rangers	Somerset Park, Ayr

17 January 1914 Match 24	Greenock Morton	2–1	Ayr United	Cappielow, Greenock

24 January 1914 Match 25	Ayr United	2–0	Third Lanark	Somerset Park, Ayr

31 January 1914 Match 26	Hibernian	0–5	Ayr United	Easter Road, Edinburgh

14 February 1914 Match 27	Ayr United	4–1	Dundee	Somerset Park, Ayr

7 March 1914 Match 28	Airdrieonians	1–1	Ayr United	Broomfield Park, Airdrie

14 March 1914 Match 29	Ayr United	0–0	Kilmarnock	Somerset Park, Ayr

17 March 1914 Match 30	Clyde	1–2	Ayr United	Shawfield Stadium, Glasgow

21 March 1914 Match 31	Ayr United	0–0	Raith Rovers	Somerset Park, Ayr

21 March 1914 Match 32	Rangers	5–2	Ayr United	Ibrox Stadium, Glasgow

28 March 1914 Match 33	Motherwell	2–0	Ayr United	Fir Park, Motherwell

4 April 1914 Match 34	Ayr United	3–1	Hamilton Academical	Somerset Park, Ayr

11 April 1914 Match 35	Partick Thistle	0–3	Ayr United	Firhill Stadium, Glasgow

15 April 1914 Match 36	Queens Park	3–3	Ayr United	Hampden Park, Glasgow

18 April 1914 Match 37	Ayr United	2–1	Aberdeen	Somerset Park, Ayr

25 April 1914 Match 38	St Mirren	1–1	Ayr United	Love Street, Paisley

Last updated: 2011.
Source: ayr-united.co.uk

=== Scottish Qualifying Cup ===
6 September 1913 1st Round	Stevenson United	1–0	Ayr United

Last updated: 2011.
Source: ayr-united.co.uk

=== Ayr Charity Cup ===
2 May 1914 Final	Ayr United	2–1	Queens Park	Somerset Park, Ayr

Last updated: 2011.
Source: ayr-united.co.uk

== Statistics ==
=== League table ===
Pos	Team	Pld	W	D	L	GF	GA	GD	Pts
8	Third Lanark	38	13	10	15	42	51	−9	36
9	Clyde	38	11	11	16	44	44	0	33
10	Ayr United	38	13	7	18	56	72	−16	33
11	Raith Rovers	38	13	6	19	56	57	−1	32
12	Kilmarnock	38	11	9	18	48	68	−20	31

Source: "1913-1914 Division 1 - SPFL Archive". SPFL.

==== Results by round ====
Round	1	2	3	4	5	6	7	8	9	10	11	12	13	14	15	16	17	18	19	20	21	22	23	24	25	26	27	28	29	30	31	32	33	34	35	36	37	38
Ground	A	H	A	A	A	A	H	A	H	H	A	H	H	A	H	H	H	A	H	H	A	H	H	A	H	A	H	A	H	A	H	A	A	H	A	A	H	A
Result	L	L	L	L	W	W	L	L	D	W	D	W	W	L	W	W	L	L	L	L	L	L	L	L	W	W	L	D	D	W	D	L	L	W	W	D	W	D
Position	12	17	20	20	16	11	11	17	16	14	13	12	10	12	8	8	8	10	11	13	15	15	16	16	16	15	15	16	15	11	12	13	16	12	11	10	9	9

Source: Statto.com
A = Away; H = Home; W = Win; D = Draw; L = Loss
