= James Hogg (footballer) =

Scottish footballer

Personal information
- Position: Right half

Senior career*
Years	Team	Apps	(Gls)
- Ayr United

International career
1922	Scotland	1	(0)
- * Club domestic league appearances and goals

James Hogg was a Scottish footballer who played as a right half.

== Career ==
Hogg played club football for Ayr United, and made one appearance for Scotland in 1922.
