= Peter Price (footballer, born 1932) =

Scottish footballer

Personal information
- Full name: Peter Price
- Date of birth: 26 February 1932
- Place of birth: Tarbolton, Scotland
- Date of death: 23 October 2015 (aged 83)
- Place of death: Ayr, Scotland
- Position: Centre forward

Youth career
- 19xx–1951: Craigmark Burntonians

Senior career*
Years	Team	Apps	(Gls)
1951–1952	St Mirren	2	(0)
1952–1953	Gloucester City	44	(8)
1953–1955	Darlington	3	(0)
1955–1962	Ayr United	199	(173)
1962	Raith Rovers	10	(1)
1962–1963	Albion Rovers	13	(4)
1963	Gladesville	?	(?)
Total		271	(186)
- * Club domestic league appearances and goals

Peter Price (26 February 1932 – 23 October 2015) was a Scottish professional footballer, who played as a centre forward.

== Career ==
Born in Tarbolton, Price began his career in junior football with Craigmark Burntonians, before turning professional in 1951 with St Mirren. After a spell in English non-league football with Gloucester City, Price returned to league football with Darlington, before playing in Scotland with Ayr United, Raith Rovers and Albion Rovers. Price later played in Australia for Gladesville.
