= Alex Ingram =

Scottish footballer (1945–2022)

Personal information
- Full name: Alexander David Ingram
- Date of birth: 2 January 1945
- Place of birth: Edinburgh, Scotland
- Date of death: 3 February 2022 (aged 77)
- Position: Forward

Senior career*
Years	Team	Apps	(Gls)
1963–1966	Queen's Park	68	(23)
1966–1970	Ayr United	112	(51)
1970	Nottingham Forest	28	(3)
1970–1977	Ayr United	168	(31)
Total		376	(108)

International career
1969	Scottish League XI	1	(0)
- * Club domestic league appearances and goals

Alexander David Ingram (2 January 1945 – 3 February 2022) was a Scottish professional footballer who played as a forward. He spent most of his career at Ayr United and since 2008 was the vice chairman of Ayr United.

== Playing career ==
Ingram owed his nickname 'Dixie' to a character from the White Heather Club. In 1970, Ingram joined English side, Nottingham Forest for a fee of £40,000 after only 28 League games and three goals, he rejoined Ayr United for £15,000.

Ingram is Ayr United's fourth all-time top-scorer, behind Peter Price (213), Sam McMillan (127) and Terry McGibbons (125) on 117 goals in all competitions. He has also maintained a close friendship with Manchester United manager, Sir Alex Ferguson, from his playing days at Somerset Park. In 2008, Ingram was inducted into the Ayr United Hall of Fame.

== Career outside football ==
Ingram founded a motor dealership. He latterly lived with dementia whilst in 24 hour nursing care. He died after a ten-year battle with the illness on 3 February 2022, at the age of 77.
