= McLaughlin & Harvey =

British construction firm

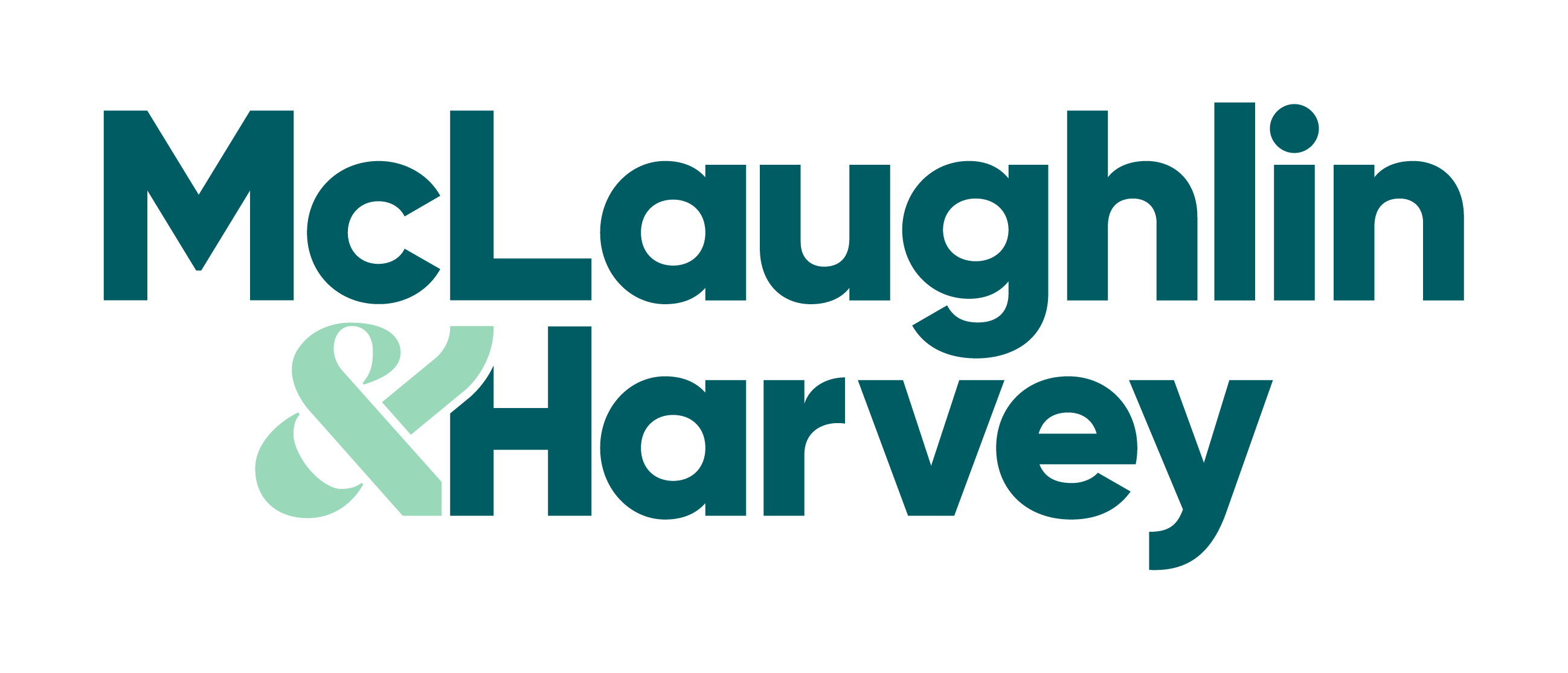
- Company type: Private
- Industry: Construction
- Founded: 1853
- Headquarters: Mallusk, Northern Ireland, UK
- Key people: Philip Cheevers, (MD)
- Website: www.mclh.co.uk

McLaughlin & Harvey is a building and civil engineering firm founded in Belfast in 1853. It operates all over UK and Ireland from its head offices located in Mallusk, just north of Belfast.

== History ==
Henry McLaughlin and William Harvey first established their business as builders and contractors in Belfast in 1853. The firm bought Barr Construction in 2007.

In 2019, McLaughlin & Harvey Holdings had a turnover of £513.4 million. Its main subsidiary firms – McLaughlin & Harvey Ltd in Belfast and Trench Holdings Ltd in Scotland - contributed £268m and £245m respectively. Turnover for the 800-strong group dropped in 2020, partly due to the impacts of the COVID-19 pandemic in the United Kingdom, to £480m, with profit of £5.9m, down a half from £11.5m in 2019. The company paid £2m in dividends in 2020 after claiming £2.2m of furlough cash from the UK Government's Coronavirus Job Retention Scheme.

== Recent projects ==
- the Stena Line Terminal in Belfast, and its equivalent at Loch Ryan in south west Scotland, completed in 2011
- Critical Care Building at the Royal Victoria Hospital, Belfast, completed in 2015
- Liverpool F.C.'s new £50m training facility, completed in 2020
- Winter Gardens conference centre, Blackpool, completed in 2021
- River Clyde dock King George V West Quay (Berth 10) in Glasgow, completed in 2021
- Broughty Ferry flood protection scheme, completed in 2022
- Victoria and Albert Museum facility in east London, due to be completed in 2024
- £55m cruise terminal in Liverpool, due to be completed in 2024

== Operations ==
McLaughlin & Harvey undertakes a wide range of work in the public and private sectors, including commercial, leisure and residential projects. The company's divisions include building construction, civil engineering, facilities management, and offshore. In June 2021, the company launched a new fit-out division.
