= Bob Hepburn =

Scottish footballer

Personal information
- Full name: Robert White Hepburn
- Date of birth: 17 December 1901
- Place of birth: Hamilton, Scotland
- Date of death: 1976 (aged 74–75)
- Place of death: Hendon, England
- Position: Goalkeeper

Senior career*
Years	Team	Apps	(Gls)
- Dykehead
1923–1924	Royal Albert	1	(0)
1924–1925	Third Lanark	0	(0)
1925	Quarter Juniors		
1925–1926	Dykehead	14	(0)
1926–1936	Ayr United	331	(0)
1936–1937	Stranraer		

International career
1932	Scotland	1	(0)
- * Club domestic league appearances and goals

Robert White Hepburn (17 December 1901 – 1976) was a Scottish footballer who played as a goalkeeper.

== Career ==
Born in Hamilton, Hepburn played club football for Dykehead, Ayr United and Stranraer, and made one appearance for Scotland in 1932.
