= 2001–02 Ayr United F.C. season =

Ayr United
2001–02 season
- Chairman: Bill Barr
- Manager: Gordon Dalziel
- First Division: Third place
- Scottish Cup: Semi-Final, lost to Celtic
- League Cup: Runners-Up
- Challenge Cup: Second round, lost to Stranraer
Home colours	Away colours

The 2001–02 season is often regarded as one of the most successful seasons of Ayr United's history. In this season they eliminated Stranraer, Kilmarnock, Inverness CT and Hibernian en route to the Scottish League Cup Final, in which they were beaten by Rangers. In the Scottish Cup they beat Deveronvale, Dunfermline Athletic and Dundee United before losing out to Celtic in the semi-final. While maintaining good cup runs the club sustained a respectable finish of Third Place in Division One.

== Competitions ==
Win Draw Loss

=== Preseason ===
16 July 2001 Friendly	Blyth Spartans	1–1	Ayr United	Croft Park, Blyth
		[(Report)]		Attendance: n/a

18 July 2001 Friendly	Darlington	0–0	Ayr United	Croft Park, Blyth
				Attendance: 182

21 July 2001 Friendly	Berwick Rangers	0–0	Ayr United	Shielfield Park, Berwick-upon-Tweed
				Attendance: 212

23 July 2001 Friendly	Ayr United	0–2	Blackpool	Somerset Park, Ayr
				Attendance: 1,381

25 July 2001 Friendly	Queens Park	0–2	Ayr United	Hampden Park, Glasgow
				Attendance: 264

28 July 2001 Friendly	Ayr United	4–0	Wigan Athletic	Somerset Park, Ayr
				Attendance: 1,300

31 July 2001 Friendly	Ayr United	0–0	Dumbarton	Somerset Park, Ayr
				Attendance: n/a

=== Scottish First Division ===
==== Matches ====
4 August 2001 Match 1	Falkirk	1–2	Ayr United	Brockville Park, Falkirk
15:00				Attendance: 2,828

11 August 2001 Match 2	Ayr United	2–0	Ross County	Somerset Park, Ayr
15:00		(Report)		Attendance: 2,457

18 August 2001 Match 3	Airdrieonians	2–1	Ayr United	Excelsior Stadium, Airdrie
15:00				Attendance: 2,039

25 August 2001 Match 4	Ayr United	0–0	Raith Rovers	Somerset Park, Ayr
15:00				Attendance: 2,410

8 September 2001 Match 5	Partick Thistle	1–2	Ayr United	Firhill Stadium, Glasgow
15:00				Attendance: 3,820

15 September 2001 Match 6	Ayr United	4–2	St Mirren	Somerset Park, Ayr
15:00				Attendance: 3,645

18 September 2001 Match 7	Arbroath	3–2	Ayr United	Gayfield Park, Arbroath
				Attendance: 438

23 September 2001 Match 8	Ayr United	2–1	Clyde	Somerset Park, Ayr
15:00				Attendance: 2,278

29 September 2001 Match 9	Inverness CT	3–1	Ayr United	Caledonian Stadium, Inverness
15:00				Attendance: 1,533

13 October 2001 Match 10	Ayr United	2–2	Falkirk	Somerset Park, Ayr
15:00				Attendance: 2,439

20 October 2001 Match 11	Ross County	3–2	Ayr United	Victoria Park, Dingwall
15:00				Attendance: 1,991

27 October 2001 Match 12	Ayr United	0–2	Partick Thistle	Somerset Park, Ayr
15:00				Attendance: 3,447

Match 13	Raith Rovers	1–1	Ayr United	Stark's Park, Kirkcaldy
15:00				Attendance: 1,781

10 November 2001 Match 14	Ayr United	0–1	Arbroath	Somerset Park, Ayr
15:00				Attendance: 1,977

17 November 2001 Match 15	St Mirren	0–1	Ayr United	Love Street, Paisley
15:00				Attendance: 3,973

24 November 2001 Match 16	Ayr United	3–0	Inverness CT	Somerset Park, Ayr
15:00				Attendance: 1,999

1 December 2001 Match 17	Clyde	2–2	Ayr United	Broadwood Stadium, Cumbernauld
15:00				Attendance: 1,303

8 December 2001 Match 18	Ayr United	1–3	Airdrieonians	Somerset Park, Ayr
15:00				Attendance: 2,656

15 December 2001 Match 19	Falkirk	0–2	Ayr United	Brockville Park, Falkirk
15:00				Attendance: 2,418

26 December 2001 Match 20	Partick Thistle	2–1	Ayr United	Firhill Stadium, Glasgow
15:00				Attendance: 4,611

29 December 2001 Match 21	Ayr United	3–1	Raith Rovers	Somerset Park, Ayr
15:00				Attendance: 2,033

12 January 2002 Match 22	Arbroath	0–2	Ayr United	Gayfield Park, Arbroath
15:00				Attendance: 700

19 January 2002 Match 23	Ayr United	0–1	Clyde	Somerset Park, Ayr
15:00				Attendance: 2,151

2 February 2002 Match 24	Inverness CT	1–1	Ayr United	Caledonian Stadium, Inverness
15:00				Attendance: 1,409

9 February 2002 Match 25	Airdrieonians	1–2	Ayr United	Excelsior Stadium, Airdrie
15:00				Attendance: 1,771

16 February 2002 Match 26	Ayr United	0–0	Ross County	Somerset Park, Ayr
15:00				Attendance: 2,186

26 February 2002 Match 27	Ayr United	4–1	St Mirren	Somerset Park, Ayr
15:00				Attendance: 1,932

2 March 2002 Match 28	Raith Rovers	3–3	Ayr United	Stark's Park, Kirkcaldy
19:45				Attendance: 2,010

9 March 2002 Match 29	Ayr United	1–1	Partick Thistle	Somerset Park, Ayr
19:45				Attendance: 3,624

26 March 2002 Match 30	Ayr United	0–0	Arbroath	Somerset Park, Ayr
19:45				Attendance: 2,249

30 March 2002 Match 31	Clyde	2–2	Ayr United	Broadwood Stadium, Cumbernauld
15:00				Attendance: 1,023

2 April 2002 Match 32	St Mirren	1–1	Ayr United	Love Street, Paisley
19:45				Attendance: 3,002

6 April 2002 Match 33	Ayr United	1–0	Inverness CT	Somerset Park, Ayr
15:00				Attendance: 1,818

13 April 2002 Match 34	Ayr United	0–0	Falkirk	Somerset Park, Ayr
15:00				Attendance: 2,473

21 April 2002 Match 35	Ross County	1–1	Ayr United	Victoria Park, Dingwall
15:00				Attendance: 2,822

27 April 2002 Match 36	Ayr United	1–0	Airdrieonians	Somerset Park, Ayr
15:00				Attendance: 2,793
Note: Match abandoned after twenty-one minutes due to crowd trouble. The result was later given as such.

=== Scottish Challenge Cup ===
7 August 2001 1st Round	St Mirren	1–3	Ayr United	Love Street, Paisley
19:30 BST	Yardley 49'		15' Teale; 49' Sheerin; 72' Annand	Attendance: 2,072

14 August 2001 2nd Round	Stranraer	3–2	Ayr United	Stair Park, Stranraer
19:30 BST	Finlayson 36'; Harty 57'; Wright 58'		7' Bradford; 82' McGinlay	Attendance: 1,387; Referee: Robert Orr

Source: ESPN Soccernet and Soccerbase

=== Scottish League Cup ===
25 September 2001 2nd Round	Ayr United	4–0	Stranraer	Somerset Park, Ayr
				Attendance: 1,503

9 October 2001 3rd Round	Ayr United	0–0 (5–4 p)	Kilmarnock	Somerset Park, Ayr
				Attendance: 7,418

28 November 2001 Quarter–Final	Ayr United	5–1	Inverness CT	Somerset Park, Ayr
				Attendance: 2,710

5 February 2002 Semi–Final	Hibernian	0–1 (a.e.t.)	Ayr United	Hampden Park, Glasgow
				Attendance: 11,779

17 March 2002 Final	Ayr United	0–4	Rangers	Hampden Park, Glasgow
				Attendance: 50,076

=== Scottish Cup ===
5 January 2002 3rd Round	Deveronvale	0–6	Ayr United	Princess Royal Park, Banff
				Attendance: 1,800

26 January 2002 4th round	Ayr United	3–0	Dunfermline Athletic	Somerset Park, Ayr
				Attendance: 3,681

23 February 2002 Quarter–Final	Dundee United	2–2	Ayr United	Tannadice Park, Dundee
				Attendance: 5,884

6 March 2002 Quarter–Final Replay	Ayr United	2–0	Dundee United	Somerset Park, Ayr
				Attendance: 4,446

23 March 2002 Semi–Final	Celtic	3–0	Ayr United	Hampden Park, Glasgow
				Attendance: 26,774

==== Final League Table ====
Pos	Team	Pld	W	D	L	GF	GA	GD	Pts	Promotion or relegation
1	Partick Thistle (C, P)	36	19	9	8	61	38	+23	66	Promotion to the Premier League
2	Airdrieonians (R)	36	15	11	10	59	40	+19	56	Club folded after the season
3	Ayr United	36	13	13	10	53	44	+9	52	
4	Ross County	36	14	10	12	51	43	+8	52	
5	Clyde	36	13	10	13	51	56	−5	49	

Source: "2001-2002 First Division - SPFL Archive". SPFL.
Rules for classification: 1) points; 2) goal difference; 3) number of goals scored.
(C) Champions; (P) Promoted; (R) Relegated
