= Sam Kennedy (footballer, born 1881) =

Scottish footballer

Personal information
- Full name: Samuel Watson Kennedy
- Date of birth: 8 April 1881
- Place of birth: Girvan, Scotland
- Date of death: 31 August 1955 (aged 74)
- Place of death: Stranraer, Scotland
- Position: Centre forward

Senior career*
Years	Team	Apps	(Gls)
1899–1902	Ayr	29	(15)
1902–1910	Partick Thistle	174	(72)
Total		203	(87)

International career
1905	Scotland	1	(0)
- * Club domestic league appearances and goals

Samuel Watson Kennedy (8 April 1881 – 31 August 1955) was a Scottish footballer who played as a centre forward.

== Career ==
Born in Girvan, Kennedy played club football for Ayr and Partick Thistle, and made one appearance for Scotland in 1905.
