= 2003–04 Ayr United F.C. season =

Ayr United
2003–04 season
- Manager: Campbell Money
- Stadium: Somerset Park
- Scottish First Division: 9th
- Scottish Cup: Third Round (lost to Falkirk)
- League Cup: First Round (lost to Dumbarton)
- Scottish Challenge Cup: First Round (lost to Stirling Albion)
Home colours	Away colours	Third colours

The 2003–04 season is the 94th season of competitive football by Ayr United.

== Competitions ==
Win Draw Loss

=== Preseason ===
16 July 2003 Friendly	Ayr United	1–6	Partick Thistle	Somerset Park, Ayr
				Attendance: 1,196

19 July 2003 Light Charity Cup	Donegal Celtic	0–0 (4–2 p)	Ayr United	Donegal Celtic Park, Belfast

22 July 2003 Friendly	Ayr United	1–5	Bristol Rovers	Somerset Park, Ayr
				Attendance: 943

26 July 2003 Friendly	Ayr United	1–4	Motherwell	Somerset Park, Ayr
				Attendance: 1,501

Last updated: 25 May 2004.
Source: ayr-united.co.uk

=== Scottish First Division ===
==== Matches ====
9 August 2003 Match 1	Clyde	3–0	Ayr United	Broadwood Stadium, Cumbernauld
				Attendance: 1,067

16 August 2003 Match 2	Ayr United	1–1	Falkirk	Somerset Park, Ayr
				Attendance: 2,519

23 August 2003 Match 3	Raith Rovers	1–1	Ayr United	Stark's Park, Kirkcaldy
				Attendance: 2,364

30 August 2003 Match 4	Ayr United	1–4	Queen of the South	Somerset Park, Ayr
				Attendance: 2,413

13 September 2003 Match 5	Inverness Caledonian Thistle	1–0	Ayr United	Caledonian Stadium, Inverness
				Attendance: 1,476

20 September 2003 Match 6	Ross County	2–2	Ayr United	Victoria Park, Dingwall
				Attendance: 2,832

27 September 2003 Match 7	Ayr United	3–2	Brechin City	Somerset Park, Ayr
				Attendance: 1,427

4 October 2003 Match 8	St Johnstone	1–1	Ayr United	McDiarmid Park, Perth
				Attendance: 2,026

18 October 2003 Match 9	Ayr United	0–2	St Mirren	Somerset Park, Ayr
				Attendance: 2,447

25 October 2003 Match 10	Falkirk	0–1	Ayr United	Brockville Park, Falkirk
				Attendance: 2,609

1 November 2003 Match 11	Ayr United	2–2	Clyde	Somerset Park, Ayr
				Attendance: 1,653

8 November 2003 Match 12	Ayr United	0–3	Inverness Caledonian Thistle	Somerset Park, Ayr
				Attendance: 1,464

16 November 2003 Match 13	Queen of the South	1–0	Ayr United	Palmerston Park, Dumfries
				Attendance: 3,555

22 November 2003 Match 14	Brechin City	3–1	Ayr United	Glebe Park, Brechin
				Attendance: 508

29 November 2003 Match 15	Ayr United	1–3	Ross County	Somerset Park, Ayr
				Attendance: 977

6 December 2003 Match 16	St Mirren	3–2	Ayr United	Love Street, Paisley
				Attendance: 2,567

13 December 2003 Match 17	Ayr United	1–1	St Johnstone	Somerset Park, Ayr
				Attendance: 1,203

20 December 2003 Match 18	Clyde	2–1	Ayr United	Broadwood Stadium, Cumbernauld
				Attendance: 1,102

27 December 2003 Match 19	Ayr United	1–0	Raith Rovers	Somerset Park, Ayr
				Attendance: 1,791

3 January 2004 Match 20	Ayr United	1–1	Queen of the South	Somerset Park, Ayr
				Attendance: 2,303

17 January 2004 Match 21	Inverness Caledonian Thistle	2–1	Ayr United	Caledonian Stadium, Inverness
				Attendance: 1,443

24 January 2004 Match 22	Ross County	1–1	Ayr United	Victoria Park, Dingwall
				Attendance: 2,732

31 January 2004 Match 23	Ayr United	1–2	Brechin City	Somerset Park, Ayr
				Attendance: 1,512

14 February 2004 Match 24	St Johnstone	3–0	Ayr United	McDiarmid Park, Perth
				Attendance: 2,067

21 February 2004 Match 25	Ayr United	2–0	St Mirren	Somerset Park, Ayr
				Attendance: 2,252

28 February 2004 Match 26	Ayr United	2–3	Falkirk	Somerset Park, Ayr
				Attendance: 2,058

13 March 2004 Match 27	Raith Rovers	2–1	Ayr United	Stark's Park, Kirkcaldy
				Attendance: 2,231

20 March 2004 Match 28	Ayr United	1–1	Inverness Caledonian Thistle	Somerset Park, Ayr
				Attendance: 1,207

27 March 2004 Match 29	Queen of the South	0–0	Ayr United	Palmerston Park, Dumfries
				Attendance: 1,831

3 April 2004 Match 30	Brechin City	0–3	Ayr United	Glebe Park, Brechin
				Attendance: 519

10 April 2004 Match 31	Ayr United	1–2	Ross County	Somerset Park, Ayr
				Attendance: 1,535

17 April 2004 Match 32	St Mirren	4–1	Ayr United	Love Street, Paisley
				Attendance: 3,211

24 April 2004 Match 33	Ayr United	1–1	St Johnstone	Somerset Park, Ayr
				Attendance: 1,119

1 May 2004 Match 34	Ayr United	1–1	Clyde	Somerset Park, Ayr
				Attendance: 1,119

8 May 2004 Match 35	Falkirk	0–0	Ayr United	Brockville Park, Falkirk
				Attendance: 2,007

15 May 2004 Match 36	Ayr United	1–0	Raith Rovers	Somerset Park, Ayr
				Attendance: 1,283

Last updated: 25 May 2004.
Source: ayr-united.co.uk

=== Scottish Challenge Cup ===
2 August 2003 First round	Ayr United	1–2 (a.e.t.)	Stirling Albion	Somerset Park, Ayr
				Attendance: 1,115

Last updated: 25 May 2004.
Source: ayr-united.co.uk

=== Scottish League Cup ===
2 September 2003 First round	Ayr United	1–2	Dumbarton	Somerset Park, Ayr
				Attendance: 1,048

Last updated: 25 May 2004.
Source: ayr-united.co.uk

=== Scottish Cup ===
10 January 2004 Third round	Ayr United	1–2	Falkirk	Somerset Park, Ayr
				Attendance: 2,632

Last updated: 25 May 2004.
Source: ayr-united.co.uk

=== West Sound Trophy ===
11 October 2003	Kilmarnock	1–0	Ayr United	Rugby Park, Kilmarnock
				Attendance: 2,500

Last updated: 25 May 2004.
Source: ayr-united.co.uk

== Stats ==
=== League table ===
Pos	Team	Pld	W	D	L	GF	GA	GD	Pts	Promotion or relegation
6	Ross County	36	12	13	11	49	41	+8	49	
7	St Mirren	36	9	14	13	39	46	−7	41	
8	Raith Rovers	36	8	10	18	37	57	−20	34	
9	Ayr United (R)	36	6	13	17	37	58	−21	31	Relegation to the Second Division
10	Brechin City (R)	36	6	9	21	37	73	−36	27	Relegation to the Second Division

Source: "2003-2004 First Division - SPFL Archive". SPFL.
Rules for classification: 1) points; 2) goal difference; 3) number of goals scored.
(R) Relegated

=== Results summary ===
Overall								Home						Away					
Pld	W	D	L	GF	GA	GD	Pts	W	D	L	GF	GA	GD	W	D	L	GF	GA	GD
36	6	13	17	37	58	−21	31	4	7	7	21	29	−8	2	6	10	16	29	−13

Last updated: 25 May 2004.
Source: Wikipedia article

=== Results by round ===
Round	1	2	3	4	5	6	7	8	9	10	11	12	13	14	15	16	17	18	19	20	21	22	23	24	25	26	27	28	29	30	31	32	33	34	35	36
Ground	A	H	A	H	A	A	H	A	H	A	H	H	A	A	H	A	H	A	H	H	A	A	H	A	H	H	A	H	A	A	H	A	H	H	A	H
Result	L	D	D	L	L	D	W	D	L	W	D	L	L	L	L	L	D	L	W	D	L	D	L	L	W	L	L	D	D	W	L	L	D	D	D	W
Position	9	9	9	9	9	9	9	9	9	9	9	9	9	9	9	9	9	9	9	9	9	9	9	10	8	9	10	10	9	9	9	9	9	9	9	9

Source: Statto.com
A = Away; H = Home; W = Win; D = Draw; L = Loss
