= Jackie Cox (footballer) =

Scottish footballer and manager

Personal information
- Full name: John Cox
- Date of birth: 1911
- Place of birth: Darvel, Scotland
- Date of death: 17 September 1990 (aged 78–79)
- Place of death: Darvel, Scotland
- Height: 5 ft 8 in (1.73 m)
- Position: Wing half

Senior career*
Years	Team	Apps	(Gls)
1929–1931	Darvel		
1931–1938	Hamilton Academical	196	(3)
1938–1939	Preston North End		
1939–1946	Ayr United	0	(0)
1946–1948	Stranraer		

Managerial career
- 1953–1956: Hamilton Academical
- 1956–1961: Ayr United
- 1962–1965: St Mirren
- * Club domestic league appearances and goals

John Cox (1911 – 17 September 1990) was a Scottish football player and manager. He served Hamilton Academical (where he spent the majority of his playing career, making over 200 appearances in the right half position), Ayr United and St Mirren (the latter as a World War II guest) as both player and manager. He also had a short spell in English football with Preston North End, and after the conflict ended he finished his career with Stranraer.

His cousin Sammy Cox was also a footballer who played at international level for Scotland and at club level for Rangers; while manager at Hamilton, he signed his nephew – also John/Jackie – for the club, although the younger Cox made only one league appearance for Accies (he also featured for Stranraer, and briefly for Kilmarnock).

== Honours ==
=== Player ===
Hamilton Academical

- Scottish Cup: runner-up 1934–35

=== Manager ===
Ayr United

- Scottish Football League Division Two: 1958–59

== Managerial statistics ==
Managerial record by team and tenure
Team	From	To	Record								Ref
Team	From	To	G	W	D	L	GF	GA	GD	Win %	Ref
Hamilton Academical	December 1953	August 1956	110	44	20	46	231	242	−11	40.00	
Ayr United	August 1956	November 1961	244	102	50	92	515	482	+33	41.80	
St Mirren	December 1962	April 1965	106	32	23	51	139	209	−70	30.19	
Total			460	178	93	189	885	933	−48	38.70	
