= Barr Construction =

Scottish construction company

- Type: Private
- Industry: Construction
- Founded: Late nineteenth century
- Headquarters: Paisley, Scotland, UK
- Key people: Bill Barr, (Chairman)
- Website: www.barr-construction.co.uk (Archive)

Barr Construction was a major Scottish contracting organisation operating throughout the United Kingdom.

== History ==
The company started in the late 19th century as a joinery firm known as W & J Barr & Sons and gradually expanded into civil engineering projects. As Barr began to grow its operations out of its native Ayrshire and into larger civil engineering developments, it decided to incorporate in 1976.

The company's stadia work included new facilities for Southampton, Fulham, Celtic, and Rangers football clubs as well as projects for lower league and rugby clubs. Clubs which got into financial difficulty because of mounting debts to the company included Airdrieonians and Raith Rovers.

In 2001 the company won the contract to upgrade the A830 road between Mallaig and Fort William in the Scottish highlands. Barr were also involved in the renovation of Home Park, the stadium home of Plymouth Argyle.

In 2006 Barr built the first "eco-store" for Tesco at Wick in Scotland, using the unorthodox method of ship transport to deliver building materials to the site in order to save on carbon emissions.

In 2007 the company was bought by McLaughlin & Harvey.

For the 2012 London Olympic games, Barr won the contract to construct the Olympic Park Basketball arena.

In November 2014 McLaughlin & Harvey integrated Barr Construction into its business and Barr Construction ceased to exist as a separate business, although the Barr name continues to be used within the group for Barr Environmental.

Barr's corporate logo mark from c.1975 until 2003
