= Ayr United F.C. =

Association football club in Scotland

Ayr United
- Full name: Ayr United Football Club
- Nickname: The Honest Men
- Founded: 1910; 116 years ago
- Ground: Somerset Park
- Capacity: 10,185 (1,597 seated)
- Chairman: David Smith
- Manager: Gary Naysmith
- League: Scottish Championship
- 2025–26: Scottish Championship, 7th of 10
- Website: ayrunitedfc.co.uk
Home colours	Away colours	Third colours

Ayr United Football Club are a football club in Ayr, Scotland, who play in the Scottish Championship, the second tier of the Scottish Professional Football League. Formed in 1910 by the merger of Ayr Parkhouse and Ayr F.C., their nickname is The Honest Men, from a line in the Robert Burns poem "Tam o' Shanter". They play at Somerset Park.

The club is currently managed by Gary Naysmith who was appointed in May 2026. The club have spent 34 seasons in Scotland's top division, the last being 1977–78, and have been the champions of the second tier of Scottish football on six occasions, and of the third tier on three occasions. The club's most successful manager, Ally MacLeod, went on to manage the Scotland national team. In 2018, Ayr United secured promotion to the Scottish Championship as champions of League One.

== History ==
Ayr United were founded in 1910 by the merger of Ayr Parkhouse and Ayr F.C. Although Inverness Caledonian Thistle are also the product of a merger between two clubs, Ayr United are the only Scottish Football League club to have been formed from a merger of two existing league clubs.

The club's honours include winning six Second Division titles (as the second tier championship) and a further three titles (as the third tier championship), most recently in 2017–18. They have not won any national cup competitions, although they were runners-up in the 2001–02 Scottish League Cup, and in the Scottish Challenge Cup in the first two seasons in which the competition was held: 1990–91 and 1991–92. They have won the local competition the Ayrshire Cup on 26 occasions, most commonly facing fierce local rivals Kilmarnock in the final. The Ayrshire Cup was last played for in season 1996–97, since when the competition has been suspended.

The club's record scorer in a single season is Jimmy Smith, who scored 66 goals for Ayr in only 38 league matches in 1927–28 and currently holds the British goalscoring record for the most league goals scored in a single season. The club's overall record scorer is Peter Price, who scored 213 times in competitive matches for the club between 1955 and 1962.

Former Scotland national team manager Ally MacLeod is regarded as the club's most famous and most successful manager. He led the club on three occasions spanning 15 years, during which his teams recorded a record 214 wins, and won two league titles. In 1973 MacLeod was voted Ayr's Citizen of the Year. More recent managers have also included the recent Scotland national team manager, George Burley, and former Scottish League Cup winner with Raith Rovers, Gordon Dalziel. Gordon Dalziel is the only manager to take Ayr to a national cup final on 17 March 2002 when they lost to Rangers 4–0.

Although the club has spent 34 seasons in Scotland's top division, they have played in the second and third tiers of Scottish senior football since the 1977–78 season. During the late 1990s and early 2000s, the club established a record of defeating teams which played in higher leagues in cup competitions, including Hibernian, Dundee, Dundee United, Motherwell, Dunfermline Athletic and four consecutive wins in cup competitions against their fiercest rivals Kilmarnock.

In 1988, Ayr United fan and businessman Sir David Murray offered to buy the club but the club's shareholders rejected the bid by a vote of 60 to 56. The manager at that time, Ally MacLeod, had threatened to leave if Murray's bid had succeeded: Murray went on to become chairman of Rangers, which coincided with a period of financial growth and league success for that club. During much of the 1990s and 2000s, a period of relative success both in league and cup competitions, the Ayr United chairman was local construction magnate Bill Barr. After Barr stood down, there were occasional boardroom struggles: the club suffered significant cashflow problems in 2004 although it survived with a combination of efforts. Prestwick-based Roy Kennedy failed to take over the club in 2005, and his company Kennedy Construction went bankrupt in 2006.

On 24 May 2009, Ayr won the Scottish First Division Play-off against Airdrie United 3–2 on aggregate to win promotion to the First Division. The following season, to celebrate the club's centenary, Ayr United played in black and white hoops, the club's original black and white kit. The away kit was crimson and gold with blue shorts to reflect the original club colours. But it was not a successful season. Ayr were relegated on the last day of the season after losing 2–1 to Morton. The club bounced back the following season, winning promotion after defeating Forfar Athletic and Brechin City in the play-offs. That same season, they knocked out Hibernian in the Scottish Cup, winning 1–0 at Somerset Park in a replay.

In the 2011–12 season, Ayr enjoyed success in the 2011–12 Scottish League Cup, beating SPL sides Inverness Caledonian Thistle, Heart of Midlothian and St Mirren on their way to the semi-finals. Ayr United played Ayrshire derby rivals Kilmarnock in the semi-finals, the first time the two clubs had met at this stage. Kilmarnock won one-nil. But the league campaign was less successful, as United were relegated to the Second Division following a play-off defeat to Airdrie United.

Following relegation, United announced that Brian Reid's contract would not be renewed. The club appointed Mark Roberts, top scorer in the previous three seasons, manager, with head of youth development, Davie White, as his assistant. In January 2015, Ian McCall was appointed Ayr's new manager, taking over from Roberts. After saving the club from relegation on the final day of the 2014–15 season, McCall led Ayr back to the Championship with a penalty shoot-out victory over Stranraer in the play-offs. Following their relegation in 2017, Ayr competed in League One but finished the season as Champions, regaining their Championship status at the first time of asking and winning their first league title in over twenty years in the process.

Ayr United enjoyed a good start to the Championship during the 2018–19 season, and found themselves leading the division for part of the season. However, injuries to key players resulted in a dip of form during the second half of the season. This poor form included a shock Scottish Cup defeat to Junior Champions Auchinleck Talbot. Ayr United eventually finish in fourth place, ensuring a place in the playoffs for promotion to the Scottish Premiership. However, they were beaten on aggregate by Inverness Caledonian Thistle.

Key players Lawrence Shankland, Robbie Crawford and Liam Smith departed at the end of 2018–19 and signed for other clubs. Despite these losses, Ayr started the 2019–20 season well and found themselves in 2nd place in September. However, manager Ian McCall departed the club to return to Partick Thistle, ending his 4 1/2-year tenure. After a recruitment process lasting four weeks, midfielder Mark Kerr was appointed as manager on an 18-month contract.

The 2019–20 season was curtailed due to the Coronavirus pandemic. United were fourth place again at the time of curtailment and this stood as their final league standing. However, the playoffs were not contested due to the pandemic.

The 2020–2021 season was played behind closed doors due to the ongoing pandemic. Ayr United became embroiled in a relegation battle, and manager Mark Kerr was sacked in February 2021. He was replaced by ex-Scotland international and former Greenock Morton, Bradford City and Livingston manager David Hopkin.

Ayr United avoided relegation on the final day of the season after a draw with Inverness Caledonian Thistle.

After a poor start to the 2021–22 season, David Hopkin resigned as manager. Following a spell as caretaker manager, Jim Duffy was appointed as manager on a contract until the end of the season. However, after a poor run of only one win in twelve league games, Duffy was sacked in December 2021.

On 7 January 2022, former Sheffield Wednesday and Dunfermline player Lee Bullen was appointed as head coach. Under Bullen's leadership, Ayr United avoided the relegation play-offs and remained in the Championship.

In the 2022–23 season Ayr would clinch second place on the last day of the season, leapfrogging Queen's Park who had lost out in a 5–3 thriller with Dundee for the league title. With Queen's dropping 2 in goal difference it allowed Ayr to jump ahead into second due to their superior goal difference. This secured a place in the play-off semi-final, however they were defeated by Partick Thistle in both legs.

== Crest and colours ==
=== Crests ===
From 1948 to 2016, Ayr United used a crest which is a shield containing a Scottish saltire, with a scroll beneath stating the club's name. In 2015, the club became subject to a legal action which claimed that the crest was an unregistered coat of arms. After it had emerged that the club's badge was in jeopardy, a petition was started by fans and gained 700 signatures in 24 hours. The campaign gained support and many political, footballing figures and fans alike lent support to keep the Ayr badge intact. Leader of the Scottish Conservative Party leader Ruth Davidson stated "If archaic rules are forcing the team to change the badge, then I think we need to look at those rules again. When John Scott brought this issue to my attention, I was happy to take it all the way to the UK Government." Another prominent name to join the campaign was former Ayr United and Bayern Munich striker and now a Sky Sports pundit on Soccer Saturday, Alan McInally, who said "Badges are so important to football supporters and are treasured by everyone. They are worn with pride by grandfathers, dads and sons as they represent the club that they support. New stadiums get built and re-named but the club badge always stays the same”.

In 2016, after a fan competition to design a new club badge, a design incorporating most of the old features of the old badge was introduced.

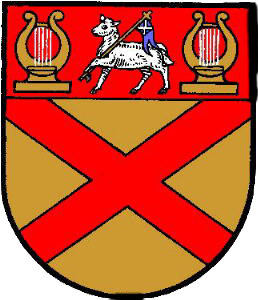
The crest of Ayrshire between 1890 and 1931, similar to the Ayr United crest.

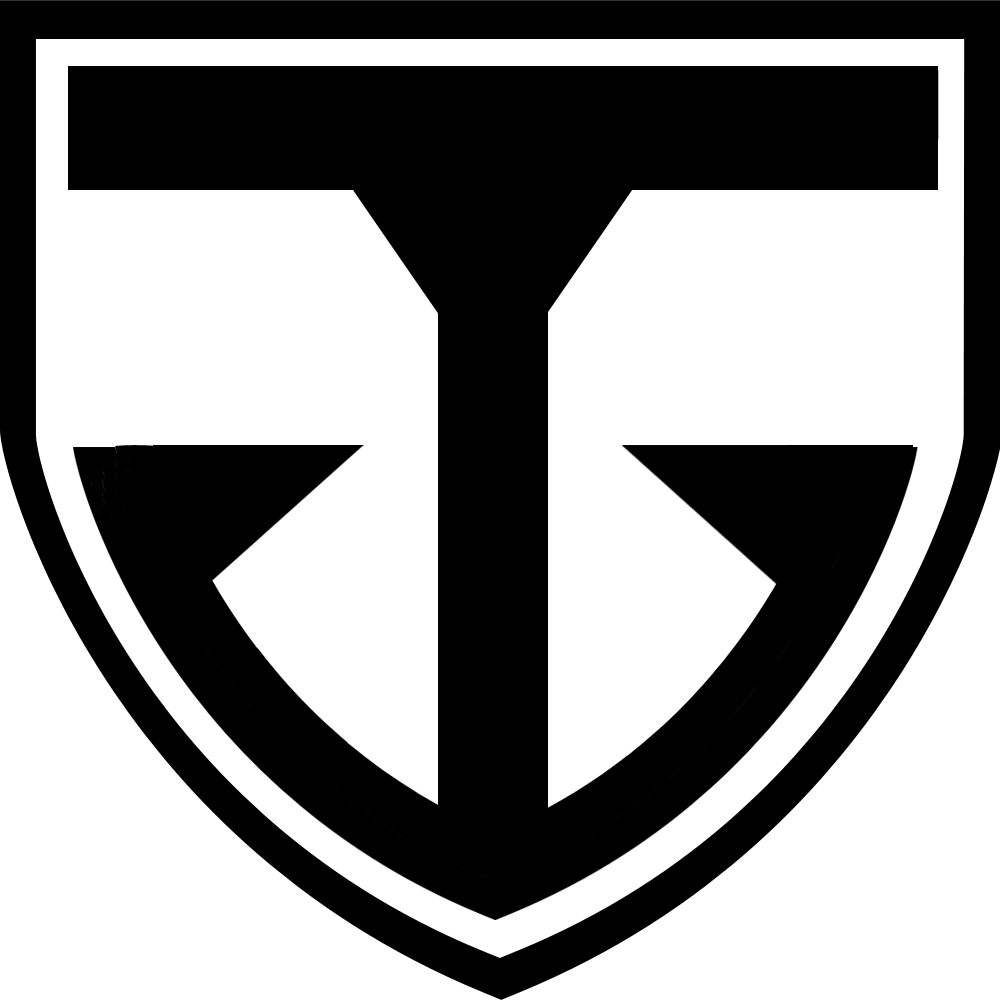
The crest worn between 1938 and 1948.

=== Colours ===
The club's original jerseys were red and gold, inherited from Ayr, with navy blue shorts and socks. In 1914, Ayr adopted black and white hoops, which were worn, with several modifications, up to 1930, when The Honest Men switched to a plain white jersey, with navy blue shorts and socks, worn until the outbreak of World War II. After the war, the club retained the white jersey, and switched back to the black shorts that had originally complemented the hooped shirts, kits similar to these were worn up to 1958, when Ayr had changed the black and white look for a white with a blue trim, used until 1963, when they once again reverted to the black and white hoops, that were kept until 1968 and not used again until the 2009–10 centenary season. From then until 1994, Ayr maintained white jerseys trimmed with black with either black or white shorts and socks, then switching to a striped shirt for a single season. The following season, Ayr wore an all-black jersey for the first time. Ayr went back to keeping an all-white jersey with either white or black shorts and socks until the centenary season. For the 2011–12 season, a half-black-half-white shirt was worn for the first time, however, Ayr FC had previously wore a similar jersey between 1899 and 1903. The 2013–14 season saw Ayr return to the white jersey, black shorts and socks for the first time since 1973.

=== Home kits ===
1910–1914	1914–1938	1938–1940	1945–1958	1973–1978	2011–12	2014–15

=== Away kits ===
1970s	1990s	1995–96	2001–02	2003–04	2009–10	2012–13

=== Sponsorship ===
Period	Sportswear	Home sponsor	Away sponsor	Third sponsor
1977–1981	Umbro	none		none
1981–1987	Umbro	Barr Construction		none
1987–1988	Umbro	Ayr Advertiser		none
1988–1990	Bukta	Centrum		none
1990–1991	Riberio	Centrum		none
1991–1993	Riberio	Arrow		none
1993–1994	Riberio	Sports Division		none
1994–1995	Core	What Everyone Wants		none
1995–1996	The Ayr United Collection	What Everyone Wants		none
1996–1997	The Ayr United Collection	Ayrshire Post		none
1997–1998	Premier Marketing UK	Ayrshire Post		none
1998–1999	Premier Marketing UK	Barr Construction		none
1999–2000	TFG Sports	Strachans Motors	Barr Construction	none
2000–2001	TFG Sports	Leader Newspaper	Barr Steel	none
2001–2002	TFG Sports	Aurigin	Barr Steel	none
2002–2004	TFG Sports	Kerr & Smith	Iveco Daily	none
2004–2005	TFG Sports	Kennedy Construction	Simply Purchasing	none
2005–2006	TFG Sports	The Home Bakery	Honest Men Trust	none
2006–2007	TFG Sports	The Events Company	Greig Lucas	none
2007–2008	Lotto Sports	Rodie	Carrick Bathrooms	none
2008–2010	Surridge Sports	Paligap		none
2010–2011	Nike	Paligap		none
2011–2014	Nike	Bodog		none
2014–2018	Adidas	Bodog		none
2018–2020	Adidas	Bitcoin SV		none
2020–2022	Hummel	Bitcoin SV		none
2022–2023	Hummel	Jewson	Lindsay Mortgage Services	RSL Renewables
2023–2024	O'Neills	Jewson	Lindsay Mortgage Services	Caledonia Vehicle Solutions
2024–2025	O'Neills	Jewson	MKM	Simpson & Shaw
2025–2026	O'Neills	Jewson		West Coast Landscaping & Ground Works
2026–2027	O'Neills	Jewson		TBC

== Stadium ==
Ayr play their football at Somerset Park in Ayr's New Town. One of the few surviving traditional stadium designs, it consists of the original Archibald Leitch designed stand, two covered terraces, and, on the North side of the ground, a new stand has been constructed which sits behind an area of older terracing. It has a capacity of 10,185. The first match to take place at Somerset Park was between the former Ayr and Aston Villa in a 3–0 victory for Ayr.

During the 1990s, the club's chairman, Bill Barr, who owned and managed a company that built modern-style stadiums and stands for several other clubs around the UK, sought — and obtained — planning permission from South Ayrshire Council for a new 10,200 all-seated stadium at Heathfield in Ayr with an associated retail development. The Scottish Executive then "called in" the application and reversed the decision in respect of the retail development. Since the club considered this aspect of the proposal necessary to fund the construction, the development did not proceed.

In November 2006, United signed a contract with Barratt Homes for the sale of Somerset Park, having secured a 20-acre (81,000 m^{2}) site in the Heathfield area of Ayr. The site would house a new £29 million stadium seating 7,650 as part of a "sports and business campus". The project ultimately did not proceed.

== First-team squad ==
As of 3 September 2026

Note: Flags indicate national team as defined under FIFA eligibility rules; some limited exceptions apply. Players may hold more than one non-FIFA nationality.

No.	Pos.	Nation	Player
1	GK	SCO	Harry Stone (on loan from Hearts)
2	DF	SCO	Nick McAllister
3	DF	SCO	Liam Dick
5	DF	SCO	Kevin Holt
6	MF	SCO	Reece Lyon (captain)
7	FW	SCO	Owen Stirton (on loan from Dundee United)
8	DF	SCO	Leon King
9	FW	SCO	Josh Landers (on loan from West Ham United)
10	FW	SCO	Kieran Shanks
11	MF	SCO	Ross Taylor
12	MF	SCO	Olly Whyte (on loan from Motherwell)
15	FW	SCO	Jamie Murphy

No.	Pos.	Nation	Player
16	MF	SCO	Ben Summers
17	FW	SCO	Thomas Hatton (on loan from Celtic)
20	DF	SCO	Luke McBeth
21	MF	ENG	Ethan Walker
22	FW	SCO	Mark McKenzie (vice-captain)
23	MF	ROU	Marco Rus
25	MF	SCO	Kenzie Mitchell
26	FW	NZL	Matthew Warbrick
32	DF	SCO	Dylan Watret
33	DF	SCO	Scott McMann
34	MF	SCO	Jamie Douglas
38	GK	SCO	Liam Russell

=== On loan ===
Note: Flags indicate national team as defined under FIFA eligibility rules; some limited exceptions apply. Players may hold more than one non-FIFA nationality.

No. / Pos. / Nation / Player; 18 / MF / SCO / Jamie Hislop (on loan at Kelty Hearts)	No. / Pos. / Nation / Player; 19 / GK / SCO / Ollie Ecrepont (on loan at Auchinleck Talbot)

== Coaching staff ==
Role	Name
Manager	Gary Naysmith
Assistant manager	Brown Ferguson
First team coach	Jamie Murphy
Goalkeeping coach	Dave Timmins
Head of youth academy	David White
Physiotherapist	Steven Maguire
Strength and conditioning coach	Greg Frame
Matchday analyst	James McFarlane
Performance analyst	Jamie Watt
Kitman	Chris Taylor

== Managers ==
Dates	Name
1910–1914	Committee
1914–1915	(England) Herbert Dainty
1915–1918	(England) Lawrence Gemson
1918–1919	(Scotland) John Cameron
1919–1923	(Scotland) James McDonald
1923–1924	(Scotland) Jimmy Richardson
1924–1926	(Scotland) Jimmy Hay
1926–1931	(Scotland) Archie Buchanan
1931–1935	(England) Alex Gibson
1935–1940	(Northern Ireland) Frank Thompson
1945–1948	(England) Bob Ferrier
1949–1953	(Scotland) Archie Anderson
1953–1955	(Scotland) Reuben Bennett
1955–1956	(Scotland) Neil McBain
1956–1961	(Scotland) Jackie Cox
1961	(Scotland) Bobby Flavell
1961–1962	(Scotland) Gerry Mays
1962–1963	(Scotland) Neil McBain
1963–1964	(Scotland) Bobby Flavell
1964–1966	(Scotland) Tom McCreath
1966–1975	(Scotland) Ally MacLeod
1975–1978	(Scotland) Alex Stuart
1978	(Scotland) Ally MacLeod
1979–1983	(Scotland) Willie McLean
1983–1985	(Scotland) George Caldwell
1985–1990	(Scotland) Ally MacLeod
1991–1993	(Scotland) George Burley
1993–1995	(England) Simon Stainrod
1995–2002	(Scotland) Gordon Dalziel
2002–2004	(Scotland) Campbell Money
2004–2005	(Scotland) Mark Shanks
2005–2007	(Scotland) Bobby Connor
2007	(Scotland) Neil Watt
2007–2012	(Scotland) Brian Reid
2012–2014	(Scotland) Mark Roberts
2015–2019	(Scotland) Ian McCall
2019–2021	(Scotland) Mark Kerr
2021	(Scotland) David Hopkin
2021	(Scotland) Jim Duffy
2022–2024	(Scotland) Lee Bullen
2024–2026	(Scotland) Scott Brown
2026–	(Scotland) Gary Naysmith

== Honours ==
=== Domestic ===
==== League ====
- Scottish second tier (Division Two, Division B, First Division, Championship)
  - Winners (6): 1911–12, 1912–13, 1927–28, 1936–37, 1958–59, 1965–66
  - Runners-up (5): 1910–11, 1955–56, 1968–69, 2000–01, 2022–23
- Scottish third tier (Second Division, League One)
  - Winners (3): 1987–88, 1996–97, 2017–18
  - Runners-up (3): 2008–09, 2010–11, 2015–16
  - Play-off winners (3): 2008–09, 2010–11, 2015–16

==== Cups ====
- Scottish League Cup
  - Runners-up (1): 2001–02
- Scottish Challenge Cup
  - Runners-up (2): 1990–91, 1991–92

=== Regional ===
- Ayrshire Cup
  - Winners (26): 1911–12, 1925–26, 1928–29, 1932–33, 1935–36, 1937–38, 1938–39, 1949–50, 1957–58, 1958–59, 1960–61, 1964–65, 1968–69, 1969–70, 1970–71, 1974–75, 1975–76, 1976–77, 1977–78, 1979–80, 1985–86, 1987–88, 1988–89, 1990–91, 1994–95, 1996–97
- Ayr Charity Cup
  - Winners (17): 1911–12, 1912–13, 1913–14, 1914–15, 1915–16, 1918–19, 1920–21, 1923–24, 1925–26, 1926–27, 1928–29, 1929–30, 1930–31, 1931–32, 1935–36, 1937–38, 1951–52
- Kilmarnock Charity Cup
  - Winners (4): 1930–31, 1932–33, 1935–36, 1936–37

== Records ==
=== Club ===
Record home attendance

25,225 vs Rangers, 13 September 1969, in Scottish League Division One

Record attendance in a match involving Ayr United

51,158 vs Rangers, 4 April 1973, Scottish Cup semi-final, at Hampden Park

Lowest home attendance

106 vs Girvan, 1 May 1991, in the Ayrshire Cup

Lowest away attendance

192 vs Deveronvale, 28 November 2009, in the Scottish Cup

Record victory

11–1 vs Dumbarton, 13 August 1952

Record defeat

0–9 vs Rangers, 16 November 1929
0–9 vs Heart of Midlothian, 28 February 1931
0–9 vs Third Lanark, 4 December 1931

Record appearances

John Murphy (597 apps), between 1963 and 1978

Record goalscorer

Peter Price, (213 goals in 251 apps) between 1955 and 1962

Most goals in a single season

Jimmy Smith, (66 goals in 38 apps) in the 1927–28 season

Most international appearances (While playing for Ayr)

James Nisbet for Scotland (3) vs Norway, Germany and The Netherlands in 1929

Youngest player

Mark Shankland, aged 15 years and 300 days (vs Brechin City, 7 May 2011)

Youngest goalscorer

Alan Forrest, aged 16 years and 321 days (vs Queens Park, 27 July 2013)

=== Individual ===
All players are from Scotland unless otherwise stated.

Top goalscorers

Rank	Name	Career	Apps	Goals	Average
1	Peter Price	1955–1962	251	213	0.85
2	Sam McMillan	1952–1968	509	129	0.25
3	Terry McGibbons	1933–1938	n/a	125	n/a
4	Alex Ingram	1966–1970, 1970–1977	280	117	0.42
5	Jimmy Richardson	n/a	n/a	110	n/a

Most appearances

Rank	Name	Career	Apps	Goals
1	John Murphy	1963–1978	597	18
2	Sam McMillan	1952–1968	509	129
3	Ian McAllister	1977–1992	462	37

=== Hall of Fame ===
Year Inducted	Name	Years at Ayr Utd.	Role(s) at Ayr Utd.
2006	Ally MacLeod	1964–1965, 1966–1975*, 1978*, 1986–1989*	Player and Manager
2006	Ian McAllister	1977–1992	Player
2006	Peter Price	1955–1962	Player
2007	Sam McMillan	1952–1968	Player and coach
2007	John 'Spud' Murphy	1963–1978	Player
2007	Henry Templeton	1987–1991	Player
2008	Alex 'Dixie' Ingram	1966–1970, 1970–1977, 2008–2022**	Player and vice-chairman
2008	Alex 'Sanny' McAnespie	1964–1978	Player
2008	Davie Stewart	1967–1974	Player
2010	Rikki Fleming	1968–1978	Player
2010	Dick Malone	1964–1971	Player
2013	The 1987–88 Squad	1987–88	Team

* years involved as a manager
** years involved as vice-chairman

Scottish Football Hall of Fame

Year Inducted	Player	Years at Ayr United
2004	Sir Alex Ferguson CBE	1973–1974
2009	Steve Archibald	1991–1992
2013	Alan Rough	1989–1990
2015	Ally MacLeod	1964–1965; 1966–1975*; 1978*; 1986–1989*

* years involved as manager

English Football Hall of Fame

year Inducted	Player	Years at Ayr United
2002	Sir Alex Ferguson CBE	1973–1974

=== International players ===
Only includes caps won while playing for Ayr United.

Scotland

- Johnny Crosbie (2 caps, 0 goals) 1919–1920
- Johnny Doyle (1 cap, 0 goals) 1975
- Bob Hepburn (1 cap, 0 goals) 1931
- Jimmy Hogg (1 cap, 0 goals) 1922
- Philip McCloy (4 caps, 0 goals) 1924–1925
- Jimmy Nisbet (3 caps, 2 goals) 1929
- Jimmy Richardson (2 caps, 0 goals) 1919
- John Smith (1 cap, 0 goals) 1924

Faroe Islands

- Jens Kristian Hansen (5 caps, 0 goals) 1999–2000
- Jens Martin Knudsen (3 caps, 0 goals) 1999–2000

Zambia

- Frankie Musonda (14 caps, 1 goal) 2022–2025
