= 2022–23 Dumbarton F.C. season =

Dumbarton
2021–22 season
- Chairman: Dr Neil MacKay
- Manager: Stevie Farrell
- Stadium: Dumbarton Football Stadium
- League Two: 2nd
- League Cup: Group stage
- Scottish Cup: Fourth round (lost to Kilmarnock)
- Top goalscorer: League: Declan Byrne (6); All: Declan Byrne, Gregor Buchanan & Finlay Gray (6)
- Highest home attendance: 1,086 (v Stirling Albion 18 April 2023
- Lowest home attendance: 276 (v Raith Rovers 19 July 2023
- Average home league attendance: 635
Home colours	Away colours

The 2022–23 season will be Dumbarton Football Club's first in Scottish League Two, the fourth tier of Scottish football, having finished ninth in the division in 2021–22 season and been relegated via the playoffs. Dumbarton will also compete in the Scottish League Cup and the Scottish Cup.

== Story of the season ==
=== May ===
Following the Sons' relegation to Scottish League Two eight players were released by the club. Paul Paton headed the departures, with Sam Ramsbottom, Patrick O'Neil, Sam Muir, Stephen Bronsky, Eoghan Stokes, Mark Lamont and David Hopkirk also released. Loan players Carlo Pignatiello, Kieran Wright and Adam Hutchinson returned to their parent clubs, whilst George Stanger was offered a permanent deal after impressing during his loan spell from University of Stirling. Player of the Year Conner Duthie was also offered a new contract however he turned it down, whilst veteran Patrick Boyle was offered a player/coach role. Joshua Oyinsan was next to leave, as he was released by the club on 12 May. David Wilson became the club's first new signing of the summer on 14 May, joining four years after leaving the club. He was followed the same day by winger Ally Love who joined after leaving Clyde. A day later Brett Long joined the club from Peterhead, signing a two-year deal. However Paddy Boyle turned down the offer of a player/coach role and left the club. Striker Kristoffer Syvertsen also left the club a week later to return to his native Norway. Martin McNiff became the club's fourth new signing of the summer, re-joining the club after leaving in 2014. The club also announced their first pre-season friendly, against Workington, on Tuesday 5 July. Further friendlies against Ayr United, Caledonian Braves and Gretna 2008 were also arranged.

=== June ===
In June a further friendly was arranged, with West of Scotland Football League Irvine Meadow XI. Defender George Stanger meanwhile turned down a permanent deal, having impressed during his loan from University of Stirling. Midfielder Ryan Blair became the club's fifth new signing of the summer on 4 June, and was joined the same day by former Albion Rovers captain Aron Lynas. A week later striker Ryan Wallace joined on a two-year deal from East Fife. On 14 April the club added sports scientist Matty Fenwick and video analyst Stephen Gray to their backroom staff. The club's squad numbers were confirmed on 15 June. On 22 June, striker Declan Byrne became the club's eighth new signing of the summer, joining after leaving Albion Rovers. Dumbarton's first pre-season friendly ended in a 1-1 draw with Ayr United at National Sports Training Centre Inverclyde, Ally Love scored the Sons' goal. Two days later came a 1-0 defeat to Lowland Football League Caledonian Braves. Ryan McGeever was named the club's new captain on 27 June, replacing Stuart Carswell in the role. Gregor Buchanan was named as vice-captain.

=== July ===
On 1 July goalkeeper Harry Broun joined the club from Kilmarnock having impressed as a trialist. The following day the Sons won 3-2 against Gretna F.C. 2008 thanks to goals from Ryan Wallace, Gregor Buchanan and a trialist striker. Wallace was on the scoresheet again three days later in a 3-0 victory against Northern Premier League outfit Workington. Midfielder Finlay Gray was next to join the club, having impressed as a trialist. He signed the same day as the club lost their opening Scottish League Cup clash 2-1 against Stirling Albion. The club's next game also ended in defeat, 2-0 to Premiership Aberdeen on 13 July. The Sons recorded their first win of the season on 16 July - 2-0 against 10 man Peterhead. Finlay Gray opened the scoring with Gregor Buchanan netting in the second-half. The League Cup campaign ended with a 0-0 draw with Scottish Championship Raith Rovers - with Sons losing the bonus point penalty shootout 3-2. 23 July saw the club defeat Irvine Meadow XI in their final pre-season friendly - with Declan Byrne, Ally Love and Finlay Gray all netting. The league season opened with a 2-0 victory against Stirling Albion thanks to Declan Byrne's double inside the first five minutes.

=== August ===
The Sons won their opening two games in August, making it their best start to a season since 1959. First was a 2-1 victory against 10 man Albion Rovers with Stuart Carswell and Ryan Wallace on target. That was followed by a 4-0 success against Annan Athletic on 13 August - with Declan Byrne's second double in as many home games added to by strikes from Gregor Buchanan and Finlay Gray. Forward John Gemmell also featured as a trialist - having left the club back in 2007 - setting up the fourth goal. He signed a permanent deal with the club on 19 August and said he was in the best shape of his career. The following day the Sons made it four wins from four, with a Thomas Orr own goal added to by Martin McNiff and Finlay Gray in a 3-1 win against Stenhousemuir. After a 7-0 defeat to Rangers B Team in the Scottish Challenge Cup, Ally Love's double ensured the Sons won their first five league games for the first time in the club's history - with a 2-1 success against Elgin City. A few days later attacking midfielder Callum Wilson joined Lowland League Broomhill on loan. Finlay Gray was named the club's August player of the month.

=== September ===
September opened with the Sons adding attacking midfielder Michael Garrity on loan from Morton. The club's first game of the month ended in a 1-0 victory against East Fife - with Declan Byrne on target. On 7 September, boss Stevie Farrell was named League Two manager of the month for August whilst Byrne was named League Two player of the month. Following the postponement of an away clash with Stranraer on 10 September following the death of Elizabeth II, another 1-0 victory followed, with Stuart Carswell's penalty the winner against Bonnyrigg Rose Athletic on 17 September leaving the Sons as the only team with a 100 percent record in British league football. Dumbarton suffered their first league defeat of the season on 202 September, losing 3-2 to Stranraer at Stair Park. In the Scottish Cup the Sons were drawn against West of Scotland Football League Cumnock Juniors, with the match selected for live coverage on BBC Scotland. Stuart Carswell was named as the club's player of the month for September.

=== October ===
The first match of October saw Dumbarton held to a 0-0 draw by Forfar Athletic at Station Park. On 7 October midfielder Finlay Gray, who had been named the club's Player of the Month for August, signed an extended deal until the summer of 2024. A 6-0 defeat to Stirling Albion followed on 8 October, with the Sons dropping behind the Binos to second in the table the following week after a 1-1 draw with Albion Rovers. Stuart Carswell got Sons' goal from the penalty spot with John Gemmell suffering a serious Achilles injury. Dumbarton avoided a Scottish Cup upset, winning 3-1 against West of Scotland Football League side Cumnock Juniors. Another Stuart Carswell penalty was added to by Gregor Buchanan and Finlay Gray in a 3-1 success. The month ended with a 1-0 away victory against Annan Athletic courtesy of Gregg Wylde's first goal of the season, whilst Kalvin Orsi was named the club's October Player of the Month.

=== November ===
The Sons made it three wins in a row on 5 November, defeating Stranraer 2-0 at the Rock with Gregor Buchanan and Michael Garrity on target. A fourth win in succession followed, with Sons defeating Elgin City 4-0 at Borough Briggs. Ross MacLean, Gregg Wylde, Aron Lynas and Ryan Wallace got the Sons' goals. The winning run ended on 19 November, as the Sons were held 2-2 by 10 man Forfar Athletic. Gregg Wylde scored his third goal in four games, with David Wilson scoring his first of the season. Former Sons player Kyle Hutton was sent-off for the Loons, with another former Dumbarton player - Stefan McCluskey - on target. The month ended with the club securing their place in the fourth round of the 2022–23 Scottish Cup thanks to a 3-1 victory against League One Clyde. David Wilson, Ryan Wallace and Ross MacLean got the goals. They were drawn against Scottish Premiership side Kilmarnock in the fourth round. Defender Aron Lynas was named the club's player of the month.

=== December ===
December opened with a 1-1 draw against Bonnyrigg Rose Athletic, with Edin Lynch making his first appearance for the club since April. On 6 December, boss Stephen Farrell was named League Two Manager of the Month for the second time. After 17 December's game with Stenhousemuir was postponed, the Sons returned to action on Christmas Eve. Defeat East Fife 2-0 - on the day the club celebrated their 150th anniversary. On 30 December midfielder Michael Garrity returned to parent club Morton, after making one start and nine appearances from the bench. 2022 ended with a 1-0 victory against Albion Rovers on Hogmanay. Ally Love scoring the winner. Brett Long was named the club's player of the month.

=== January ===
The Sons' first game of 2023, against second place- side Stirling Albion was called off on 7 January due to a waterlogged pitch. On 13 January, young midfielder Luca Vata was promoted from the club's U18s to the first-team squad on amateur terms. The following day striker Russell McLean joined from Scottish League One side Peterhead, having scored four times against the Sons in the previous campaign. McLean made his debut that afternoon, in a 2-1 defeat to Forfar Athletic - with Sons reduced to 10 men after just 12 minutes when Ryan McGeever was sent-off. On 19 January boss Stephen Farrell and his backroom team signed a new deal until the summer of 2025. The club exited the Scottish Cup on 21 January, with an injury time loss to Premiership Kilmarnock. On 28 January the club secured a first win of the new year, 1-0 against Bonnyrigg Rose Athletic thanks to a Gregg Wylde strike. On 30 January midfielder Callum Wilson, who had been on loan at Broomhill, left the club permanently. Gregg Wylde was named the club's player of the month.

=== February ===
On 1 February club captain Ryan McGeever joined Scottish League One Clyde on loan, with Peter Grant moving in the opposite direction. Grant made his debut in a 1-1 draw with Stenhousemuir on February 4, with Matty Yates scoring in injury time to cancel out Ally Love's opener. A second straight home win followed on February 11, with Russell McLean netting his first goal for the club in a 2-1 success against Annan Athletic. That was followed by a 2-0 defeat to East Fife on February 18, which saw Stirling Albion narrow the gap to Sons to just three points. The club suffered back-to-back league defeats for the first time when Elgin City won at the Rock on February 25. Becoming the first away side to win a league game at the ground for 11 months. Three days later Dumbarton returned to winning ways, defeating Stenhousemuir 1-0 at home thanks to Finlay Gray's first-half goal. Aron Lynas was named as the club's player of the month.

=== March ===
March began with a 2-0 away victory against Stranraer, thanks to goals from Ross MacLean and Gregor Buchanan. 16-year-old academy graduate Luca Vata, nephew of former Celtic player Rudi Vata, made his debut as a late substitute. On March 7 a planned game with second placed Stirling Albion was called off due to a frozen pitch with under two hours notice, leading to the Binos submitting a complaint to the Scottish Professional Football League. Four days later a planned clash with Forfar Athletic also fell victim to the weather. The Sons returned to action on March 18, suffering a humiliating 5-1 defeat to ninth placed Albion Rovers. A week later a meeting of the top two ended in a 2-2 draw, with Ross MacLean and Finlay Gray on target. Four days later, the Sons were able to name just four substitutes as they lost 1-0 at home to Forfar Athletic. Ally Love missed an early penalty for the hosts. Peter Grant was named the club's Player of the Month.

=== April ===
On April 1 the Sons suffered a 2-1 home loss to Stenhousemuir, their first defeat after taking the lead in a game all season. Aron Lynas was on target for the home side. Another defeat to Annan Athletic followed on April 8 - with David Wilson scoring a superb free-kick. On April 11 a planned clash with Stirling Albion was called off for a fourth time - just 20 minutes before kick off after heavy rain deemed the pitch unplayable. On April 14, midfielder David Wilson signed a new two-year contract with the club. A first win in five followed, with Declan Byrne and Russell McLean on the scoresheet in a 2-0 victory against Bonnyrigg Rose Athletic on April 15. The same day winger Ross MacLean signed a new two-year deal. The long awaited clash with Stirling Albion finally took place at the fifth time of asking on April 18, ending 0-0 - a result that left the Binos nine points clear with three games remaining. The clean sheet did mean that both the club and goalkeeper Brett Long set new club records however for the most in a season. A day later Gregg Wylde agreed a new one-year contract with the club as did top scorer Declan Byrne. A 1-0 victory over East Fife followed, with Martin McNiff getting the game's only goal - and both sides having a penalty saved. Aron Lynas was next to agree a new deal, signing for an additional year with the option of a second. The month ended with a 1-0 loss to Elgin City, whilst Kalvin Orsi earned the club's Player of the Month award.

=== May ===
The season ended on May 6 with a 1-1 draw against Stranraer in which Edin Lynch scored his first goal for the club. After the game Aron Lynas was named the club's Player of the Year with Finlay Gray winning the Young Player of the Year award. In the playoffs, the Sons were knocked out at the semi-final stage - after a 6-0 first leg defeat to Annan Athletic.

== First team transfers ==
- From end of 2021–22 season, to last match of season 2022–23

=== In ===
Player	From	League	Fee
David Wilson	Albion Rovers	Scottish League Two	Free
Ally Love	Clyde	Scottish League One	Free
Brett Long	Peterhead	Scottish League One	Free
Martin McNiff	Stirling Albion	Scottish League Two	Free
Ryan Blair	East Fife	Scottish League Two	Free
Aron Lynas	Albion Rovers	Scottish League Two	Free
Ryan Wallace	East Fife	Scottish League Two	Free
Declan Byrne	Albion Rovers	Scottish League Two	Free
Harry Broun	Kilmarnock	Scottish Premiership	Free
Finlay Gray	Broomhill	Lowland League	Free
John Gemmell	Cambuslang Rangers	West of Scotland Football League	Free
Michael Garrity	Greenock Morton	Scottish Championship	Loan
Russell McLean	Peterhead	Scottish League One	Free
Peter Grant	Clyde	Scottish League One	Loan

=== Out ===
Player	To	League	Fee
Sam Ramsbottom	Edinburgh	Scottish League One	Free
Stephen Bronsky	East Kilbride	Lowland League	Free
Mark Lamont			Free
David Hopkirk	Drumchapel United	West of Scotland Football League First Division	Free
Patrick O'Neil	Gartcairn	West of Scotland League First Division	Free
Eoghan Stokes	Christchurch United	Southern League	Free
Paul Paton	Glenafton Athletic	West of Scotland League Premier Division	Free
Sam Muir	Gretna 2008	Lowland League	Free
Conner Duthie	Clyde	Scottish League One	Free
Joshua Oyinsan	Weymouth	National League South	Free
Paddy Boyle	Gartcairn	West of Scotland League First Division	Free
Kristoffer Syvertsen			Free
Callum Wilson	Broomhill	Lowland League	Loan
Callum Wilson	Gretna 2008	Lowland League	Free
Ryan McGeever	Clyde	Scottish League One	Loan

== Fixtures and results ==
Win Draw Loss Upcoming fixture

=== Friendlies ===
23 June 2022	Ayr United	1 - 1	Dumbarton	National Sports Training Centre Inverclyde
19:00	OG 7'	Report	Ally Love 11'	Attendance: Closed doors

25 June 2022	Caledonian Braves	1 - 0	Dumbarton	Alliance Park
15:00	Kelly 39'	Report

2 July 2022	Gretna 2008	2 - 3	Dumbarton	Raydale Park
14:00	Rhys Caves 13', Trialist 37'	Report	Ryan Wallace 27' Gregor Buchanan 33', Trialist 80'	Attendance: 150

5 July 2022	Workington AFC	0 - 3	Dumbarton	Borough Park (Workington)
19:45		Report	Ryan Wallace 3', Stuart Carswell 21' (pen.), Ross MacLean 42'	Referee: J Mulligan

23 July 2022	Irvine Meadow	2 - 3	Dumbarton	Meadow Park
12:30	Callum Graham 5', Neil Slooves 23'	Report	Declan Byrne 2', Ally Love 49', Finlay Gray 78'	Attendance: 250; Referee: R Birrell

=== Scottish League One ===
30 July 2022 League Two	Dumbarton	2 – 0	Stirling Albion	Dumbarton Football Stadium
15:00	Declan Byrne 1' 5'	Report	Cammy Clark (red card) 71'	Attendance: 632; Referee: Duncan Williams

6 August 2022 League Two	Albion Rovers	1 – 2	Dumbarton	Cliftonhill Stadium
15:00	Lewis Kidd 17', Kyle Fleming (red card) 22'	Report	Stuart Carswell 24' (pen.), Ryan Wallace 88'	Attendance: 372; Referee: Steven Kirkland

13 August 2022 League Two	Dumbarton	4 – 0	Annan Athletic	Dumbarton Football Stadium
15:00	Declan Byrne 3' 53', Finlay Gray 40', Gregor Buchanan 88'	Report		Attendance: 596; Referee: Barry Cook

20 August 2022 League Two	Stenhousemuir	1 – 3	Dumbarton	Ochilview Park
15:00	Euan O'Reilly 71'	Report	OG 32', Martin McNiff 54', Finlay Gray 90+1'	Attendance: 602; Referee: Gavin Duncan

27 August 2022 League Two	Dumbarton	2 – 1	Elgin City	Dumbarton Football Stadium
15:00	Ally Love 51' (pen.) 54' (pen.)	Report	Kane Hester 28'	Attendance: 688; Referee: Duncan Williams

3 September 2022 League Two	East Fife	0 – 1	Dumbarton	New Bayview
15:00		Report	Declan Byrne 35'	Attendance: 520; Referee: Daniel Graves

17 September 2022 League Two	Dumbarton	1 – 0	Bonnyrigg Rose Athletic	Dumbarton Football Stadium
15:00	Stuart Carswell 28' (pen.)	Report		Attendance: 709; Referee: Colin Whyte

20 September 2022 League Two	Stranraer	3 – 2	Dumbarton	Stair Park
19:45	James Hilton 53', Matty Grant 71', Dylan Forrest (yellow card) 21' (yellow-red card) 85', Paul Woods 89' (pen.)	Report	Martin McNiff 75', Joe McKee 86' (pen.)	Attendance: 321; Referee: Steven Kirkland

1 October 2022 League Two	Forfar Athletic	0 – 0	Dumbarton	Station Park
15:00		Report		Attendance: 474; Referee: Alastair Grieve

8 October 2022 League Two	Stirling Albion	6 – 0	Dumbarton	Forthbank Stadium
15:00	Robert Thomson 11', Paul McLean 12', Dale Carrick 22', Ross McGeachie 44', Kyle Banner 64' 70'	Report		Attendance: 826; Referee: Barry Cook

15 October 2022 League Two	Dumbarton	1 – 1	Albion Rovers	Dumbarton Football Stadium
15:00	Stuart Carswell 24' (pen.), Ryan Wallace (red card) 90+5'	Report	Charlie Reilly 6'	Attendance: 558; Referee: Peter Stuart

29 October 2022 League Two	Annan Athletic	0 – 1	Dumbarton	Galabank Stadium
15:00		Report	Gregg Wylde 48'	Attendance: 405; Referee: Lloyd Wilson

5 November 2022 League Two	Dumbarton	2 – 0	Stranraer	Dumbarton Football Stadium
15:00	Gregor Buchanan 45+1', Michael Garrity 90+2'	Report		Attendance: 582; Referee: Graham Beaton

12 November 2022 League Two	Elgin City	0 – 4	Dumbarton	Borough Briggs
15:00		Report	Ross MacLean 27', Gregg Wylde 52', Aron Lynas 75'. Ryan Wallace 89'	Attendance: 707; Referee: Dan McFarlane

19 November 2022 League Two	Dumbarton	2 – 2	Forfar Athletic	Dumbarton Football Stadium
15:00	Gregg Wylde 40', David Wilson 64'	Report	OG 8', Stefan McCluskey 63', Kyle Hutton (yellow card) 38' (yellow-red card) 48'	Attendance: 744; Referee: Gavin Duncan

3 December 2022 League Two	Bonnyrigg Rose Athletic	1 – 1	Dumbarton	New Dundas Park
15:00	Neil Martyniuk 45' (pen.)	Report	OG 59'	Attendance: 936; Referee: Calum Scott

24 December 2022 League Two	Dumbarton	2 – 0	East Fife	Dumbarton Football Stadium
15:00	Gregor Buchanan 33', David Wilson 47'	Report		Referee: Graham Beaton

31 December 2022 League Two	Albion Rovers	0 – 1	Dumbarton	Cliftonhill Stadium
13:00		Report	Ally Love 70'	Referee: Barry Cook

14 January 2023 League Two	Forfar Athletic	2 – 1	Dumbarton	Station Park
15:00	Ben Armour 58' 67' (pen.)	Report	Ryan McGeever (red card) 12' Ally Love 76' (pen.)	Referee: Ross Hardie

28 January 2023 League Two	Dumbarton	1 – 0	Bonnyrigg Rose Athletic	Dumbarton Football Stadium
15:00	Gregg Wylde 15'	Report		Attendance: 708; Referee: Alan Newlands

4 February 2023 League Two	Stenhousemuir	1 – 1	Dumbarton	Ochilview Park
15:00	Matty Yates 90+5'	Report	Ally Love 45+2'	Attendance: 422; Referee: Jordan Curran

11 February 2023 League Two	Dumbarton	2 – 1	Annan Athletic	Dumbarton Football Stadium
15:00	Ryan Wallace 5'. Russell McLean 79'	Report	Tommy Goss 51'	Attendance: 514; Referee: Duncan Williams

18 February 2023 League Two	East Fife	2 – 0	Dumbarton	New Bayview
15:00	Aaron Steele 24', Alex Ferguson 90+3'	Report		Referee: Peter Stuart

25 February 2023 League Two	Dumbarton	1 – 2	Elgin City	Dumbarton Football Stadium
15:00	Ryan Blair 44'	Report	Kane Hester 16', Russell Dingwall 50' (pen.)	Referee: Dan McFarlane

28 February 2023 League Two	Dumbarton	1 – 0	Stenhousemuir	Dumbarton Football Stadium
19:45	Finlay Gray 38'	Report		Attendance: 509; Referee: Stewart Luke

4 March 2023 League Two	Stranraer	0 – 2	Dumbarton	Stair Park
15:00		Report	Ross MacLean 33', Gregor Buchanan 76'	Referee: Iain Sneddon

18 March 2023 League Two	Dumbarton	1 – 5	Albion Rovers	Dumbarton Football Stadium
15:00	OG 89'	Report	Joe Bevan 5' 12', Charlie Reilly 32' 90+1', Callum Wilson 39'	Attendance: 503; Referee: Alex Shepherd

25 March 2023 League Two	Stirling Albion	2 – 2	Dumbarton	Forthbank Stadium
15:00	Robert Thomson 35' 70'	Report	Ross MacLean 21' Finlay Gray 52'	Attendance: 1441; Referee: Calum Scott

29 March 2023 League Two	Dumbarton	0 – 1	Forfar Athletic	Dumbarton Football Stadium
19:45		Report	Seb Ross 63'	Attendance: 457; Referee: Graham Grainger

1 April 2023 League Two	Dumbarton	1 – 2	Stenhousemuir	Dumbarton Football Stadium
15:00	Aron Lynas 45+4'	Report	Gavin Reilly 70', Tam Orr 78'	Attendance: 520; Referee: Chris Fordyce

8 April 2023 League Two	Annan Athletic	3 – 1	Dumbarton	Galabank Stadium
15:00	Willie Gibson 2', OG 21', Tony Wallace 26'	Report	David Wilson 75'	Attendance: 430; Referee: Alastair Grieve

15 April 2023 League Two	Bonnyrigg Rose Athletic	0 – 2	Dumbarton	New Dundas Park
15:00	Alieu Faye (red card) 90+6'	Report	Declan Byrne 71', Russell McLean 90+4'	Attendance: 867; Referee: Colin Whyte

18 April 2023 League Two	Dumbarton	0 – 0	Stirling Albion	Dumbarton Football Stadium
19:45		Report		Attendance: 1,086; Referee: Greg Soutar

22 April 2023 League Two	Dumbarton	1 – 0	East Fife	Dumbarton Football Stadium
15:00	Martin McNiff 73'	Report		Attendance: 557; Referee: Ross Hardie

29 April 2023 League Two	Elgin City	1 – 0	Dumbarton	Borough Briggs
15:00	Ross Draper 90+4'	Report		Attendance: 790; Referee: Dan McFarlane

6 May 2023 League Two	Dumbarton	1 – 1	Stranraer	Dumbarton Football Stadium
15:00	Edin Lynch 28'	Report	OG 25'	Attendance: 665; Referee: Alan Newlands

=== Scottish League One Playoffs ===
9 May 2023 Semi-final	Annan Athletic	6 – 0	Dumbarton	Galabank Stadium
19:45	Tommy Goss 7' Max Kilsby 24', Tommy Muir 40', Aidan Smith 62', Dominic Docherty 82', Benjamin Luissint 89'	Report	Kalvin Orsi (red card) 28'	Attendance: 840; Referee: Calum Scott

13 May 2023 Semi-final	Dumbarton	0 - 0 (0 – 6 agg.)	Annan Athletic	Dumbarton Football Stadium
15:00		Report		Attendance: 296; Referee: Iain Sneddon

=== Scottish Cup ===
21 October 2022 Second round	Cumnock Juniors	1 – 3	Dumbarton	Townhead Park
19:45	Ryan Carnwath 50'	Report	Stuart Carswell 28' (pen.), Gregor Buchanan 77', Finlay Gray 90+1'	Attendance: 1002; Referee: Dan McFarlane

26 November 2022 Third round	Clyde	1 – 3	Dumbarton	New Douglas Park
19:45	Olly McDonald 63'	Report	David Wilson 19' Ryan Wallace 36', Ross MacLean 90+4'	Attendance: 563; Referee: Stewart Luke

21 January 2023 Fourth round	Kilmarnock	1 – 0	Dumbarton	Rugby Park
	Jordan Jones 90+1'	Report		Attendance: 3705; Referee: Nick Walsh

=== Scottish Challenge Cup ===
23 August 2022 Second round	Rangers B	7 – 0	Dumbarton	Dumbarton Football Stadium
19:45	Alex Lowry 8' 16' (pen.) 49', Charlie McCann 34', Zak Lovelace 42', Aaron Lyall 64' Stephen Kelly 81'	Report		Referee: Iain Sneddon

=== Scottish League Cup ===
==== Matches ====
9 July 2022 Group stage	Dumbarton	1 – 2	Stirling Albion	Dumbarton Football Stadium
15:00	Ross MacLean 86'	Report	Robert Thomson 54', Kieran Moore 68'	Attendance: 309; Referee: Greg Soutar

13 July 2022 Group stage	Aberdeen	2 – 0	Dumbarton	Pittodrie Stadium
19:45	Ross McCrorie 36', Matty Kennedy 57'	Report		Attendance: 7189; Referee: Colin Steven

16 July 2022 Group stage	Peterhead	0 – 2	Dumbarton	Balmoor Stadium
15:00	Paul Dixon (red card) 45'	Report	Finlay Gray 23', Gregor Buchanan 71'	Attendance: 351; Referee: Barry Cook

19 July 2022 Group stage	Dumbarton	0 – 0 (2–3 p)	Raith Rovers	Dumbarton Football Stadium
19:45		Report		Attendance: 276; Referee: Graham Grainger

== Player statistics ==
As of 13 May 2023 (UTC)

=== All competitions ===
#	Position	Player	Starts	Subs	Unused subs	Goals	Red cards (red card)	Yellow cards (yellow card)
22	MF	(Scotland) Ryan Blair	39	3	0	1	0	13
17	DF	(Scotland) Declan Breen	0	1	0	0	0	0
21	GK	(Scotland) Harry Broun	5	0	40	0	0	0
5	DF	(Scotland) Gregor Buchanan	40	2	0	6	0	11
15	FW	(Scotland) Declan Byrne	18	9	6	6	0	5
6	MF	(Scotland) Stuart Carswell	34	2	2	4	0	8
10	MF	(Scotland) Michael Garrity	1	9	1	1	0	0
99	FW	(Scotland) John Gemmell	2	6	0	0	0	0
19	DF	(Scotland) Peter Grant	13	3	1	0	0	5
18	MF	(Scotland) Finlay Gray	33	9	0	6	0	9
9	MF	(Scotland) Ally Love	23	15	2	5	0	9
1	GK	(Northern Ireland) Brett Long	40	0	5	0	0	4
12	DF	(Scotland) Aron Lynas	44	0	0	2	0	8
4	DF	(Scotland) Edin Lynch	2	7	14	1	0	1
2	DF	(Scotland) Ryan McGeever	3	5	13	0	1	0
14	MF	(Scotland) Joe McKee	24	8	2	1	0	5
11	MF	(Scotland) Ross MacLean	18	13	0	5	0	3
16	FW	(Scotland) Russell McLean	6	14	0	2	0	1
23	DF	(Scotland) Martin McNiff	39	3	1	3	0	6
7	FW	(Scotland) Kalvin Orsi	36	6	1	0	1	3
17	MF	(Scotland) Luca Vata	1	4	14	0	0	1
32	FW	(Scotland) Ryan Wallace	20	12	0	4	1	6
10	MF	(Scotland) Callum Wilson	3	6	1	0	0	1
8	MF	(Scotland) David Wilson	22	11	5	4	0	5
3	DF	(Scotland) Gregg Wylde	30	7	7	4	0	1

=== Captains ===
No.	P	Name	Country	No. games	Notes
2	DF	Ryan McGeever	(Scotland)	3	Club captain
5	DF	Gregor Buchanan	(Scotland)	39	Vice-captain
3	DF	Gregg Wylde	(Scotland)	3	Third-captain

Last updated: As of match played 23:53, 10 May 2023 (UTC)
Source: Competitive match reports.
Competitive matches only
Matches started as captain only
Country: FIFA nationality; No.: Squad number; P: Position; Name: Player name; No. Games: Number of games started as captain.

== League table ==
Pos	Team	Pld	W	D	L	GF	GA	GD	Pts	Promotion, qualification or relegation
1	Stirling Albion (C, P)	36	21	10	5	67	37	+30	73	Promotion to League One
2	Dumbarton	36	18	8	10	49	39	+10	62	Qualification for the League One play-offs
3	Annan Athletic (O, P)	36	14	9	13	61	51	+10	51	Qualification for the League One play-offs
4	East Fife	36	14	8	14	54	50	+4	50	Qualification for the League One play-offs
5	Forfar Athletic	36	13	9	14	37	43	−6	48	

Rules for classification: 1) Points; 2) Goal difference; 3) Goals scored; 4) Head-to-to head points; 5) Head-to-head goal difference; 6) Play-off (only for deciding promotion, play-off participation and relegation).
(C) Champions; (O) Play-off winners; (P) Promoted
