= 2021–22 Dumbarton F.C. season =

Dumbarton
2021–22 season
- Chairman: John Steele (until 27 October 2020) Dr Neil MacKay (27 October onwards)
- Manager: Stephen Farrell
- Stadium: Moreroom.com Stadium
- League One: 9th (relegated via playoffs)
- League Cup: Group stage
- Scottish Cup: Third round
- Top goalscorer: League: Stuart Carswell (7); All: Ross MacLean (9)
- Highest home attendance: 1198 (v Dundee, 22 January 2022)
- Lowest home attendance: 259 (v Rangers B, 11 August 2021)
- Average home league attendance: 539
Home colours	Away colours

The 2021–22 season was Dumbarton Football Club's fourth in Scottish League One, the third tier of Scottish football, having finished ninth in the division in 2020–21 and winning the playoffs. Dumbarton also competed in the Scottish League Cup, Scottish Challenge Cup and the Scottish Cup.

== Story of the season ==
=== May ===
After ensuring the Sons avoided relegation via the playoffs, manager Jim Duffy departed the club by mutual consent on 24 May after two-and-a-half years in charge. Ross Forbes was next to depart, joining League Two side Stenhousemuir on 26 May and he was followed by Nat Wedderburn who also joined the Warriors. Defender Ryan McGeever however became the first player to commit his future to the club, signing a new two-year deal on 27 May. A day later forward PJ Crossan became the third player to depart the club, signing a two-year deal with League Two Forfar Athletic. The same day the Sons were drawn with St Mirren, Dunfermline Athletic, Partick Thistle and Stenhousemuir in the Scottish League Cup. On 29 May Stephen Farrell was announced as the club's new manager, signing a two-year deal. Frank McKeown followed him as the club's new assistant manager with Barry Smith leaving the Sons. The following day goalkeeper coach Robert Glen departed with Eric Phillips, who had worked with Farrell at Stranraer, joining the Sons in his place. The month ended with Morgyn Neill and Rico Quitongo turning down new deals at the club whilst Ruaridh Langan, Joshua Bradley-Hurst, Daniel Church and Robert Jones were all released.

=== June ===
On 2 June, Andy Geggan became the club's first new signing of the summer. Inking a one-year deal a decade after leaving the club. The same day defender Sam Wardrop rejected a new deal and left the club. Conner Duthie became the second member of the 2020–21 squad to extend his deal on 3 June. Inking a new season long contract. He was joined in signing up for the new season by Paddy Boyle who re-joined the club – 12 years after leaving. Midfielder Eoghan Stokes was the next player to sign and he was followed in arriving by goalkeeper Callum Erskine – signed from Stenhousemuir. The same day club captain Stuart Carswell signed a new two-year deal keeping him at the Rock until the summer of 2023. Winger Adam Frizzell rejected a deal however, becoming the third Sons player to move to Airdrieonians and he was joined in turning down a new deal by Jaime Wilson – who left to pursue a trial at a full-time club. 10 June saw five new faces arrive, in the shape of returning midfielder Joe McKee, winger Ross MacLean, striker David Hopkirk, defensive midfielder Paul Paton and defender Edin Lynch. Gregor Buchanan was the next player to sign, returning to the club he had left in 2017 on a two-year deal. Goalkeeper Sam Ramsbottom extended his time at the Rock for another season the same day, having made himself first choice after arriving in March 2021. Attacker Kalvin Orsi completed a trio of signings – as the Sons returned to pre-season training. The league fixtures were announced on 15 June – with Sons starting away to Clyde on 31 July. Dumbarton's pre-season campaign kicked off on 22 June, as the Sons lost 2–1 to Lowland Football League East Kilbride. Kalvin Orsi got Dumbarton's goal. That was followed by a 1–0 victory against Scottish Premiership Motherwell, courtesy of a late David Hopkirk strike and 0–0 draw with Greenock Morton.

=== July ===
The Sons' final pre-season friendly ended in a 1–0 victory against local rivals Clydebank thanks to Joe McKee's goal. The same day Carlo Pignatiello became the club's latest new recruit – joining on a season long loan from Livingston. He was followed in arriving by Norwegian forward Kristoffer Syvertsen and former Hibernian midfielder Callum Wilson. A positive Covid-19 test saw the Sons' first Scottish League Cup tie with St Mirren forfeited on 10 July. On 12 July defender Sam Muir became the club's 15th new signing of the summer. Joining from Motherwell. He was followed by 16-year-old Kirk McKnight who joined on a loan deal from Kilmarnock. Able to name just two outfield substitutes, the Sons lost 2–1 to Scottish League Two Stenhousemuir in their first League Cup tie – with Ross MacLean on the scoresheet. Midfielder Evan Maley joined the club on amateur terms on 16 July – with four players still self-isolating. The following day Sons lost 5–1 to Dunfermline Athletic with Maclean again on the scoresheet. On Monday 19 July midfielder Mark Lamont became the club's latest new addition. Joining after two years out of football. The League Cup campaign ended with a 2–0 loss to Championship side Partick Thistle on 20 July. On 31 July Sons started their league campaign with a 3–0 victory against Clyde at Broadwood Stadium. A Conrad Balatoni own goal was added to by strikes from Ross MacLean and Conner Duthie.

=== August ===
A 2–2 draw with Airdrieonians followed, with Ryan McGeever and Andy Geggan scoring in the final 10 minutes after Sons had been two goals down. Striker Ryan Schiavone became the club's 19th new signing of the summer on 10 August, joining on a six-month loan from Heart of Midlothian. He made his debut in a 3–2 Scottish Challenge Cup defeat to Rangers B to following day. Back-to-back defeats to Queen's Park and Cove Rangers then followed. August ended with a 2–1 away victory against Montrose where Kalvin Orsi scored his first goal for the club.

=== September ===
September began with goalkeeper Patrick O'Neil joining the club following an injury to Callum Erskine. The Sons first game of the month saw them defeat East Fife 5–0 – their biggest league victory in over a decade – with Ross MacLean, Gregor Buchanan, Ryan McGeever and Eoghan Stokes all on the scoresheet. That was followed by a 2–1 away victory against Falkirk with Kalvin Orsi and Callum Wilson on target, and a 1–1 draw with Alloa Athletic where Paddy Boyle scored his first goal of the season at the newly renamed Moreroom.com Stadium.

=== October ===
October began in disastrous fashion with a 5–0 away defeat to Peterhead. On 7 October manager Stephen Farrell and midfielder Callum Wilson were both recognised for their performances in September by being named Scottish Professional Football League monthly award winners. This was followed by a 3–0 defeat to Queen's Park and incredible 3–2 defeat to Airdrieonians – where the Sons finished with eight men. On 26 October striker David Hopkirk announced he would take a break from football, but would remain under contract with the Sons. The following day chairman John Steele stepped down, and was replaced by Dr Neil Mackay in the role. October ended with another defeat – this time 2–1 to East Fife, with Conner Duthie on the scoresheet.

=== November ===
The losing run was ended on 6 November with a 1–1 draw against Clyde. Eoghan Stokes' third goal of the season gave Dumbarton the lead in the 89th minute, only for David Goodwillie to level in injury time. That was followed by a 3–0 defeat to Falkirk on 13 November that extended the winless run to seven games. A first win since September finally arrived on 21 November, with the Sons defeating Alloa Athletic 2–1 courtesy of Stuart Carswell's penalty and Eoghan Stokes' late strike. Fernandy Mendy was sent off for the hosts. Goals from Carlo Pignatiello, Joe McKee and Ryan Schiavone saw the Sons then defeat East of Scotland Football League Sauchie Juniors in the third round of the Scottish Cup and they were drawn against Dundee at home in the fourth round.

=== December ===
December opened with a 2–0 defeat to table topping Cove Rangers and 3–1 home loss to Montrose. The Sons then twice led against Peterhead through Andy Geggan and Conner Duthie before suffering their third consecutive loss, 3–2. The Boxing Day clash with Queen's Park was then called off due to a Covid-19 outbreak.

=== January ===
The Sons' first game of 2022 ended with a fourth straight loss, 1–0 at home to Airdrieonians. A day later defender Kirk McKnight returned to Kilmarnock at the end of his loan spell. Goalkeeper Calum Erskine was next to leave, as he was released on 6 January. A heavy 6–2 loss to Falkirk followed, with Gregg Wylde featuring as a trialist. Wylde signed permanently for the club on 10 January, whilst forward Ryan Schiavone returned to Heart of Midlothian at the end of his loan deal. Kieran Wright was next to arrive, with the goalkeeper joining on loan from Rangers on 13 January. He was followed by forward Joshua Oyinsan who joined from National League North Eastbourne Borough. Oyinsan scored on his debut, with Gregg Wylde adding a second as Sons secured their first victory of the year against East Fife on 15 January. Adam Hutchinson was the next new face, joining on loan from Dundee United on 21 January. The Sons exited the Scottish Cup 1–0 against Premiership Dundee on 22 January, in a game where they were reduced to 10 men in the first half following the dismissal of Ross MacLean. The same day defender Stephen Bronsky – who had featured as a trialist in the victory against East Fife – joined the club. MacLean's red card was later overturned on appeal. On 28 January midfielders Andy Geggan and Evan Maley left the club. January ended with a 2–2 draw against league leaders Cove Rangers, with Stuart Carswell scoring twice from the penalty spot. Off the park Colin Piechniczek joined the club's board.

=== February ===
The Sons' first game of February ended in a 1–1 draw away to Montrose, with Josh Oyinsan on target. A 2–1 defeat to Queen's Park followed, with Stuart Carswell scoring his sixth of the campaign to become the club's top scorer for the season. On 11 February, goalkeeper Patrick O'Neil joined West of Scotland Football League side Troon on loan until the end of the season. On 12 February the Sons defeated Clyde 3–1 at Broadwood Stadium with Ross MacLean scoring a brace, and Stuart Carswell also on target. All three goals came within the first 21 minutes. On 18 February, defender George Stanger joined on loan from Lowland Football League University of Stirling. He made his debut in a 2–1 defeat to Alloa Athletic with Paul Paton scoring. Paton was sent-off the following week, along with Ross MacLean, taking the Sons' total of red cards in league games to five – all dished out by referee Scott Lambie. Goals from MacLean, Eoghan Stokes and Carlo Pignatiello weren't enough to stop the nine man Sons losing 4–3 to Peterhead however, as they dropped to ninth in the League One table.

=== March ===
The Sons' first game in March ended in a 3–0 defeat to Queen's Park – their fourth defeat in four games to the Spiders. That was followed by damaging defeats to East Fife (where captain Stuart Carswell picked up the first red card of his Dumbarton career) and Falkirk – with the Sons falling behind inside the first five minutes of four consecutive games. It was also the second time during the season where the side had lost five straight league matches. The month ended with a 0–0 draw against Montrose, with Kieran Wright saving a late Michael Gardyne penalty to earn his first clean sheet of the season. In the game striker Kristoffer Syvertsen made his first appearance since 11 August after a lengthy injury battle.

=== April ===
The club's first game of April saw Syvertsen grab the winner against Alloa Athletic in the fifth minute of injury time, with Conner Duthie scoring the first brace of his Dumbarton career on his 50th appearance. That was followed by a 1–1 draw with Peterhead with Joshua Oyinsan on target. A late defeat to 10 man Airdrieonians on 16 April however saw the Sons' place in the relegation playoffs confirmed for a second consecutive season. That was followed by a 1–0 defeat against Cove Rangers that saw the Aberdeen side win the 2021–22 Scottish League One title. The regular season ended with a 2–1 victory against Clyde – with Syvertsen and Gregg Wylde on target. Following the game Conner Duthie was named the club's Player of the Year, with Carlo Pignatiello named Players' Player of the Year and Young Player of the Year.

=== May ===
In May the Sons were relegated to Scottish League Two for the first time since 2009, after a 5–2 aggregate defeat to Edinburgh City. Ross MacLean was on target in the first leg, taking him to nine for the season, with Kristoffer Syvertsen's third of the campaign the only goal the Sons managed in the home leg.

== First team transfers ==
- From end of 2020–21 season, to last match of season 2021–22

=== In ===
Player	From	League	Fee
Andy Geggan	BSC Glasgow	Lowland Football League	Free
Patrick Boyle	Kelty Hearts	Scottish League Two	Free
Eoghan Stokes	Airdrieonians	Scottish League One	Free
Calum Erskine	Stenhousemuir	Scottish League Two	Free
Joe McKee	Queen of the South	Scottish Championship	Free
David Hopkirk	Stenhousemuir	Scottish League Two	Free
Ross MacLean	Queen's Park	Scottish League Two	Free
Paul Paton	East Kilbride	Lowland Football League	Free
Edin Lynch	Alloa Athletic	Scottish Championship	Free
Gregor Buchanan	Queen of the South	Scottish Championship	Free
Kalvin Orsi	Greenock Morton	Scottish Championship	Free
Carlo Pignatiello	Livingston	Scottish Premiership	Loan
Kristoffer Syvertsen	Clyde	Scottish League One	Free
Callum Wilson	Hibernian	Scottish Premiership	Free
Sam Muir	Motherwell	Scottish Premiership	Free
Kirk McKnight	Kilmarnock	Scottish Premiership	Loan
Evan Maley	St Cadoc's	West of Scotland Football League	Free
Mark Lamont	Free Agent	N/A	Free
Ryan Schiavone	Heart of Midlothian	Scottish Premiership	Loan
Patrick O'Neil	Brechin City	Scottish League Two	Free
Gregg Wylde	East Kilbride	Lowland Football League	Free
Kieran Wright	Rangers	Scottish Premiership	Loan
Joshua Oyinsan	Eastbourne Borough	National League North	Free
Adam Hutchinson	Dundee United	Scottish Premiership	Loan
Stephen Bronsky	Edinburgh City	Scottish League Two	Free
George Stanger	University of Stirling	Lowland Football League	Loan

=== Out ===
Player	To	League	Fee
Ross Forbes	Stenhousemuir	Scottish League Two	Free
Nat Wedderburn	Stenhousemuir	Scottish League Two	Free
PJ Crossan	Forfar Athletic	Scottish League Two	Free
Morgyn Neill	Cove Rangers	Scottish League One	Free
Ruaridh Langan	Stranraer	Scottish League Two	Free
Rico Quitongo	Airdrieonians	Scottish League One	Free
Joshua Bradley-Hurst	Clyde	Scottish League One	Free
Daniel Church	Alloa Athletic	Scottish League One	Free
Robert Jones	Clyde	Scottish League One	Free
Sam Wardrop	Airdrieonians	Scottish League One	Free
Adam Frizzell	Airdrieonians	Scottish League One	Free
Jaime Wilson	Falkirk	Scottish League One	Free
Calum Erskine	Cumbernauld Colts	Lowland Football League	Free
Evan Maley	Broomhill	Lowland Football League	Free
Andy Geggan	Drumchapel United	West of Scotland Football League	Free
Patrick O'Neil	Troon	West of Scotland Football League	Loan

== Fixtures and results ==
Win Draw Loss Upcoming fixture

=== Friendlies ===
22 June 2021	East Kilbride	2–1	Dumbarton	K-Park Training Academy
19:45	Neil McLaughlin 31' (pen.), Craig Malcolm 69'	Report	Kalvin Orsi 7'	Attendance: 100

26 June 2021	Dumbarton	1–0	Motherwell	Dumbarton Football Stadium
12:00	David Hopkirk 87'	Report		Attendance: Closed doors Referee: David Dickinson

29 June 2021	Dumbarton	0–0	Greenock Morton	Dumbarton Football Stadium
19:30		Report		Attendance: 300; Referee: David Dickinson

3 July 2021	Dumbarton	1–0	Clydebank	Dumbarton Football Stadium
14:00	Joe McKee 52'	Report		Attendance: 300

=== Scottish League One ===
31 July 2021 League One	Clyde	0–3	Dumbarton	Broadwood Stadium
15:00		Report	OG 11', Ross MacLean 34', Conner Duthie 80'	Attendance: 746; Referee: Chris Graham

7 August 2021 League One	Dumbarton	2–2	Airdrieonians	Dumbarton Football Stadium
15:00	Ryan McGeever 80', Andy Geggan 86'	Report	Gabby McGill 17', Rhys McCabe 48' (pen.), Sam Wardrop (yellow card) 27' (yellow-red card) 59'	Attendance: 532; Referee: Barry Cook

14 August 2021 League One	Queen's Park	3–0	Dumbarton	Firhill Stadium
15:00	Simon Murray 24', Louis Longridge 49', Liam Brown 88'	Report		Attendance: 613; Referee: Craig Napier

21 August 2021 League One	Dumbarton	1–3	Cove Rangers	Dumbarton Football Stadium
15:00	Stuart Carswell 49'	Report	Mitch Megginson 23', Robbie Leitch 24', Rory McAllister 84' (pen.)	Attendance: 456; Referee: Duncan Williams

28 August 2021 League One	Montrose	1–2	Dumbarton	Links Park
15:00	Graham Webster 84' (pen.)	Report	Gregor Buchanan 20', Kalvin Orsi 30'	Attendance: 599; Referee: Lloyd Wilson

11 September 2021 League One	Dumbarton	5–0	East Fife	Dumbarton Football Stadium
15:00	Ross MacLean 12', Gregor Buchanan 41' 66', Ryan McGeever 73', Eoghan Stokes 87'	Report		Attendance: 469; Referee: Steven Reid

18 September 2021 League One	Falkirk	1–2	Dumbarton	Falkirk Stadium
15:00	Charlie Telfer 90+8'	Report	Kalvin Orsi 60', Callum Wilson 68'	Attendance: 3518; Referee: Dan McFarlane

25 September 2021 League One	Dumbarton	1–1	Alloa Athletic	Dumbarton Football Stadium
15:00	Paddy Boyle 80'	Report	Steven Boyd 45'	Attendance: 573; Referee: Matthew MacDermid

2 October 2021 League One	Peterhead	5–0	Dumbarton	Balmoor Stadium
15:00	Ryan Conroy 4', Hamish Ritchie 48', Jason Brown 53', Josh Mulligan 80', Scott Brown 82' (pen.)	Report		Attendance: 545; Referee: Steven Kirkland

16 October 2021 League One	Dumbarton	0–3	Queen's Park	Dumbarton Football Stadium
15:00		Report	Grant Gillespie 49', Bob McHugh 74', Luis Longstaff 79'	Attendance: 652; Referee: Barry Cook

23 October 2021 League One	Airdrieonians	3–2	Dumbarton	Excelsior Stadium
15:00	Rhys McCabe 8' (pen.) Dylan Easton 90', Salim Kouider-Aïssa 90+6'	Report	Ross MacLean 25' (red card) 56', Paul Paton 90+4', Gregor Buchanan (yellow card) 7' (yellow-red card) 88' Andy Geggan (yellow card) 41' (yellow-red card) 90'	Attendance: 653; Referee: Scott Lambie

30 October 2021 League One	East Fife	2–1	Dumbarton	Bayview Stadium
15:00	Liam Newton 36', Kyle Connell 71'	Report	Conner Duthie 90'	Attendance: 442; Referee: Lloyd Wilson

4 November 2021 League One	Dumbarton	1–1	Clyde	Dumbarton Football Stadium
15:00	Eoghan Stokes 89'	Report	David Goodwillie 90+1'	Attendance: 562; Referee: Steven Kirkland

13 November 2021 League One	Dumbarton	0–3	Falkirk	Dumbarton Football Stadium
15:00		Report	Michael Ruth 9', Aidan Nesbitt 54', Charlie Telfer 71'	Attendance: 886; Referee: Chris Graham

20 November 2021 League One	Alloa Athletic	1–2	Dumbarton	Recreation Park
15:00	Conor Sammon 72' Fernandy Mendy (yellow card) 60' (yellow-red card) 72'	Report	Stuart Carswell 62' (pen.), Eoghan Stokes 82'	Attendance: 609; Referee: David Dickinson

4 December 2021 League One	Cove Rangers	2–0	Dumbarton	Balmoral Stadium
15:00	Fraser Fyvie 69', Iain Vigurs 82'	Report		Attendance: 371; Referee: Chris Fordyce

11 December 2021 League One	Dumbarton	1–3	Montrose	Dumbarton Football Stadium
15:00	Conner Duthie 15'	Report	Graham Webster 32' (pen.), 35', Liam Callachan 60'	Attendance: 386; Referee: Grant Irvine

18 December 2021 League One	Dumbarton	2–3	Peterhead	Dumbarton Football Stadium
15:00	Andy Geggan 17', Conner Duthie 28'	Report	Josh Mulligan 25', Russell McLean 37' 66'	Attendance: 336; Referee: George Calder

2 January 2022 League One	Dumbarton	0–1	Airdrieonians	Dumbarton Football Stadium
13:30		Report	Dylan Easton 69'	Attendance: 312; Referee: Steven Kirkland

9 January 2022 League One	Falkirk	6–2	Dumbarton	Falkirk Stadium
15:00	Anton Dowds 8' 45' 88', Callumn Morrison 13', Aaron Taylor-Sinclair 54', Aidan Keena 75'	Report	Paul Paton 56', Stuart Carswell 66' (pen.)	Attendance: 500; Referee: Calum Scott

15 January 2022 League One	Dumbarton	2–0	East Fife	Dumbarton Football Stadium
15:00	Joshua Oyinsan 55', Gregg Wylde 65'	Report		Attendance: 481; Referee: Alan Newlands

29 January 2022 League One	Dumbarton	2–2	Cove Rangers	Dumbarton Football Stadium
15:00	Stuart Carswell 40' (pen.) 85' (pen.)	Report	Rory McAllister 52' (pen.), Connor Scully 54'	Attendance: 447; Referee: Alan Muir

5 February 2022 League One	Montrose	1–1	Dumbarton	Links Park
15:00	Craig Johnstone 24', Paul Watson (red card) 90+6'	Report	Joshua Oyinsan 44'	Attendance: 531; Referee: Steven Kirkland

8 February 2022 League One	Queen's Park	2–1	Dumbarton	Firhill Stadium
19:45	Luis Longstaff 7' 45+1'	Report	Stuart Carswell 27' (pen.)	Attendance: 428; Referee: Greg Aitken

12 February 2022 League One	Clyde	1–3	Dumbarton	Broadwood Stadium
15:00	Robert Jones 34' Lewis Jamieson (yellow card) 89' (yellow-red card) 89'	Report	Ross MacLean 8' 21' Stuart Carswell 19'	Attendance: 612; Referee: Steven Reid

19 February 2022 League One	Dumbarton	1–2	Alloa Athletic	Dumbarton Football Stadium
15:00	Paul Paton 45'	Report	Kevin Cawley 22', Adam King 84'	Attendance: 678; Referee: Lloyd Wilson

26 February 2022 League One	Peterhead	4–3	Dumbarton	Balmoor Stadium
15:00	Hamish Ritchie 4' 42', Russell McLean 8', Grant Savoury 87'	Report	Paul Paton (yellow card) 32' (yellow-red card) 37' Ross MacLean 64' (yellow card) 82' (yellow-red card) 84', Eoghan Stokes 78', Carlo Pignatiello 90+2'	Attendance: 534; Referee: Scott Lambie

5 March 2022 League One	Dumbarton	0–3	Queen's Park	Dumbarton Football Stadium
15:00		Report	Luca Connell 5' 35' Louis Longridge 75'	Attendance: 584; Referee: Steven Reid

12 March 2022 League One	East Fife	2–0	Dumbarton	New Bayview
15:00	Kyle Connell 2', Danny Denholm 62'	Report	Stuart Carswell (red card) 90+2'	Attendance: 858; Referee: Calum Scott

19 March 2022 League One	Dumbarton	0–2	Falkirk	Dumbarton Football Stadium
15:00		Report	Jaze Kabia 3', Charlie Telfer 27'	Attendance: 685; Referee: Steven Kirkland

26 March 2022 League One	Dumbarton	0–0	Montrose	Dumbarton Football Stadium
15:00		Report	Elijah Simpson (red card) 90+3'	Attendance: 492; Referee: Colin Steven

2 April 2022 League One	Alloa Athletic	2–3	Dumbarton	Recreation Park
15:00	Riley-Snow 82', Stefan Scougall 90+1' (pen.)	Report	Conner Duthie 85' (pen.) 88', Kristoffer Syvertsen 90+5'	Attendance: 676; Referee: Lorraine Watson

9 April 2022 League One	Dumbarton	1–1	Peterhead	Dumbarton Football Stadium
15:00	Joshua Oyinsan 5'	Report	Russell McLean 44'	Attendance: 527; Referee: Calum Scott

16 April 2022 League One	Airdrieonians	3–2	Dumbarton	Excelsior Stadium
15:00	Dylan Easton 24', Calum Gallagher 27', Jordan Allan 88' Adam Frizzell (red card) 41'	Report	George Stanger 39', OG 70'	Attendance: 902; Referee: Greg Aitken

23 April 2022 League One	Cove Rangers	1–0	Dumbarton	Balmoral Stadium
15:00	Mitch Megginson 75'	Report		Attendance: 1645; Referee: Lorraine Watson

30 April 2022 League One	Dumbarton	2–1	Clyde	Dumbarton Football Stadium
15:00	Kristoffer Syvertsen 10', Gregg Wylde 82'	Report	Lewis Jamieson 45+1', Kevin Nicol (red card) 90'	Attendance: 655; Referee: Grant Irvine

=== Scottish League One Playoffs ===
2 May 2021 Semi-final	Edinburgh City	4–1	Dumbarton	Ainslie Park
19:45	Ousy See 11' 71', OG 27', John Robertson 90+1'	Report	Ross MacLean 61'	Attendance: 630; Referee: Chris Graham

7 May 2021 Semi-final	Dumbarton	1–1 (2–5 agg.)	Edinburgh City	Dumbarton Football Stadium
15:00	Kristoffer Syvertsen 59'	Report	Ryan Shanley 64'	Referee: Gavin Duncan

=== Scottish Cup ===
27 November 2021 Third round	Dumbarton	3–1	Sauchie Juniors	Dumbarton Football Stadium
15:00	Carlo Pignatiello 24', Joe McKee 90', Ryan Schiavone 90+3'	Report	Danny Smith 58' (pen.)	Attendance: 571; Referee: Peter Stuart

22 January 2022 Fourth round	Dumbarton	0–1	Dundee	Dumbarton Football Stadium
15:00	Ross MacLean (red card) 44'	Report	Leigh Griffiths 63' (pen.)	Attendance: 1198; Referee: Colin Steven

=== Scottish League Cup ===
==== Matches ====
10 July 2021 Group Stage	Dumbarton	0 – 3 (awarded)	St Mirren	Dumbarton Football Stadium
15:00		Report

13 July 2021 Group Stage	Dumbarton	1–2	Stenhousemuir	Dumbarton Football Stadium
19:45	MacLean 40'	BBC Report	J.Lyon 63'; Thompson 79'	Attendance: 200

17 July 2021 Group Stage	Dunfermline Athletic	5–1	Dumbarton	East End Park
15:00	Nikolay Todorov 2', Dom Thomas 4', Craig Wighton 29', OG 51', Kevin O'Hara 71'	Report	Ross MacLean 56'	Attendance: 1000; Referee: David Dickinson

20 July 2021 Group Stage	Partick Thistle	2–0	Dumbarton	Firhill Stadium
19:45	Brian Graham 45+1', 52'	Report		Attendance: 1000; Referee: Mike Roncone

=== Scottish Challenge Cup ===
11 August 2021	Dumbarton	2–3	Rangers B	Dumbarton Football Stadium
19:45	Gregor Buchanan 88', Eoghan Stokes 89'		Jake Hastie 20'. Alex Lowry 25', Tony Weston 76'	Attendance: 256; Referee: Steven Reid

== Player statistics ==
As of 07:34, 4 May 2022 (UTC)

=== All competitions ===
#	Position	Player	Starts	Subs	Unused subs	Goals	Red cards (red card)	Yellow cards (yellow card)
3	DF	(Scotland) Paddy Boyle	33	0	4	1	0	2
16	DF	(Scotland) Stephen Bronksy	12	1	5	0	0	0
5	DF	(Scotland) Gregor Buchanan	40	0	1	4	1	12
6	MF	(Scotland) Stuart Carswell	35	4	0	7	1	9
7	MF	(Scotland) Conner Duthie	31	11	1	6	0	5
12	GK	(Scotland) Calum Erskine	2	0	5	0	0	2
8	MF	(Scotland) Andy Geggan	14	3	5	2	1	8
21	GK	(Scotland) Ryan Hanley (Trialist)	0	0	1	0	0	0
27	DF	(Scotland) Adam Hutchinson	6	1	4	0	0	0
28	FW	(Scotland) David Hopkirk	8	3	1	0	0	1
16	MF	(Scotland) Mark Lamont	0	1	1	0	0	0
4	DF	(Scotland) Edin Lynch	21	0	21	0	0	4
24	MF	(Scotland) Evan Maley	0	1	11	0	0	0
2	DF	(Scotland) Ryan McGeever	15	0	0	2	0	3
14	MF	(Scotland) Joe McKee	16	9	9	1	0	1
22	DF	(Scotland) Kirk McKnight	1	1	18	0	0	0
11	MF	(Scotland) Ross MacLean	33	2	0	9	3	7
20	DF	(Scotland) Sam Muir	11	0	28	0	0	0
21	GK	(Scotland) Patrick O'Neil	0	0	21	0	0	0
9	FW	(Scotland) Kalvin Orsi	29	12	1	2	0	1
26	FW	(Nigeria) Joshua Oyinsan	12	1	0	3	0	4
18	MF	(Northern Ireland) Paul Paton	25	1	6	3	1	10
15	MF	(Scotland) Carlo Pignatiello	40	1	0	2	0	4
1	GK	(England) Sam Ramsbottom	27	0	14	0	0	2
25	FW	(Scotland) Ryan Schiavone	5	13	2	1	0	3
29	DF	(New Zealand) George Stanger	12	0	1	1	0	0
10	MF	(Republic of Ireland) Eoghan Stokes	9	20	10	5	0	3
17	FW	(Norway) Kristoffer Syvertsen	3	11	0	3	0	0
19	MF	(Scotland) Callum Wilson	17	26	1	1	0	3
12	GK	(Scotland) Kieran Wright	14	0	1	0	0	0
22	DF	(Scotland) Gregg Wylde	11	3	4	2	0	0

=== Captains ===
No.	P	Name	Country	No. games	Notes
6	MF	Stuart Carswell	(Scotland)	35	
2	DF	Ryan McGeever	(Scotland)	1	
5	DF	Gregor Buchanan	(Scotland)	6	
18	MF	Paul Paton	(Northern Ireland)	1	
22	DF	Gregg Wylde	(Scotland)	1	

Last updated: As of match played 23:18, 8 May 2022 (UTC)
Source: Competitive match reports.
Competitive matches only
Matches started as captain only
Country: FIFA nationality; No.: Squad number; P: Position; Name: Player name; No. Games: Number of games started as captain.

== League table ==
Pos	Team	Pld	W	D	L	GF	GA	GD	Pts	Promotion, qualification or relegation
6	Falkirk	36	12	8	16	49	55	−6	44	
7	Peterhead	36	11	9	16	46	51	−5	42	
8	Clyde	36	9	12	15	39	62	−23	39	
9	Dumbarton (R)	36	9	7	20	48	71	−23	34	Qualification for the League One play-offs
10	East Fife (R)	36	5	8	23	31	70	−39	23	Relegation to League Two

Rules for classification: 1) Points; 2) Goal difference; 3) Goals scored; 4) Head-to-to head points; 5) Head-to-head goal difference; 6) Play-off (only for deciding promotion, play-off participation and relegation).
(R) Relegated
