= Kyle Fleming =

Scottish footballer

Personal information
- Date of birth: 25 February 2002 (age 24)
- Place of birth: Wishaw, Scotland
- Position: Midfielder

Team information
- Current team: Clyde
- Number: 22

Youth career
- Celtic
- Dundee

Senior career*
Years	Team	Apps	(Gls)
2020–2021	Dundee	0	(0)
2020–2021	→ Annan Athletic (loan)	17	(1)
2021–2022	Annan Athletic	23	(0)
2022–2023	Albion Rovers	35	(1)
2023–2024	Stranraer	30	(2)
2024–2025	Annan Athletic	17	(0)
2025	→ Elgin City (loan)	11	(0)
2025–	Clyde	38	(2)
- * Club domestic league appearances and goals as of 17:00, 5 September 2026 (UTC)

Kyle Fleming (born 25 February 2002) is a Scottish professional footballer who plays as a midfielder for Scottish League Two club Clyde. Fleming came through the youth academy of Dundee and has played for Annan Athletic (two spells), Albion Rovers, Stranraer and Clyde, as well as loan spells with Annan and Elgin City.

== Career ==
After impressing at Dundee in the youth teams and in pre-season friendlies, Fleming joined Scottish League Two side Annan Athletic on a season-long loan. Fleming made his debut for the Galabankies in a Scottish League Cup game against Stranraer, and made his league debut a week later against Cowdenbeath. Fleming would score his first goals for Annan in another League Cup game away to Albion Rovers, netting twice in the game.

In May 2021, Fleming joined Annan on a permanent deal.

In June 2022, Fleming signed for Scottish League Two side Albion Rovers.

In June 2023, following the relegation of Albion Rovers, Fleming signed for Scottish League Two club Stranraer. Fleming would again be involved in the League Two relegation play-off, but finished on the winning side after Stranraer defeated East Kilbride.

On 11 June 2024, Fleming returned to former club Annan Athletic, now in Scottish League One, on a one-year deal. Fleming made his return debut for the Galabankies as a substitute in a win over Inverness Caledonian Thistle in the Scottish League Cup group stage.

On 28 February 2025, Fleming joined Scottish League Two club Elgin City on loan until the end of the season. The following day, Fleming made his debut for Elgin as a substitute in an away league defeat to rivals Peterhead. After not being able to play in the Scottish League One play-offs for Elgin due to their match-up being against his parent club Annan Athletic, Fleming returned to the Galabankies at the end of the season, before being released by Annan.

On 8 July 2025, Fleming signed a one-year deal with Scottish League Two club Clyde. After a successful first season with the Bully Wee, Fleming signed a new two-year deal with Clyde in May 2026.

== Career Statistics ==
As of 5 September 2026

Club	Season	League			Scottish Cup		League Cup		Other		Total	
Club	Season	Division	Apps	Goals	Apps	Goals	Apps	Goals	Apps	Goals	Apps	Goals
Dundee	2020–21	Scottish Championship	0	0	0	0	0	0	0	0	0	0
Annan Athletic (loan)	2020–21	Scottish League Two	17	1	2	0	3	2	0	0	22	3
Annan Athletic	2021–22	Scottish League Two	23	0	3	0	4	1	3 (Note: Appearances in the Scottish Challenge Cup and the Scottish League One play-offs)	0	33	1
Annan Athletic	Total		40	1	5	0	7	3	3	0	55	4
Albion Rovers	2022–23	Scottish League Two	35	1	2	0	4	0	2 (Note: Appearance(s) in the Scottish League Two play-offs)	0	43	1
Stranraer	2023–24	Scottish League Two	30	2	0	0	4	0	2 (Note: One appearance in the Scottish Challenge Cup. one appearance in the Scottish League Two play-offs)	0	36	2
Annan Athletic	2024–25	Scottish League One	17	0	1	0	3	0	2 (Note: Appearances in the Scottish Challenge Cup)	0	23	0
Elgin City (loan)	2024–25	Scottish League Two	11	0	–		–		0	0	11	0
Clyde	2025–26	Scottish League Two	32	2	1	0	4	0	11 (Note: 7 appearances in the Scottish Challenge Cup, 4 appearances in the Scottish League One play-offs)	0	48	2
Clyde	2026–27	Scottish League Two	6	0	0	0	4	0	2	0	12	0
Clyde	Total		38	2	1	0	8	0	13	0	60	2
Career total			171	6	9	0	26	3	22	0	228	9
