= Joe McKee =

Scottish footballer

Personal information
- Full name: Joseph John Paul McKee
- Date of birth: 31 October 1992 (age 34)
- Place of birth: Glasgow, Scotland
- Height: 1.80 m (5 ft 11 in)
- Position: Midfielder

Team information
- Current team: Cumnock Juniors

Youth career
- 2000–2005: Dundee United
- 2005–2008: Livingston
- 2009–2011: Burnley

Senior career*
Years	Team	Apps	(Gls)
2008–2009	Livingston	1	(0)
2009–2012	Burnley	0	(0)
2011–2012	→ St Mirren (loan)	2	(0)
2012–2013	Bolton Wanderers	0	(0)
2013–2016	Greenock Morton	64	(4)
2016–2017	Carlisle United	4	(0)
2017–2019	Falkirk	34	(6)
2019	→ Dundalk (loan)	5	(0)
2019–2020	Dumbarton	24	(2)
2020–2021	Queen of the South	10	(2)
2021–2023	Dumbarton	45	(1)
2023–2024	Peterhead	17	(2)
2024–	Cumnock Juniors	0	(0)

International career^{‡}
2011	Scotland U19	2	(0)
- * Club domestic league appearances and goals as of 18:39, 21 November 2023 (UTC) ‡ National team caps and goals as of 19 July 2013

Joseph John Paul McKee (born 31 October 1992) is a Scottish footballer who plays as a midfielder for Cumnock Juniors.

McKee has previously played for Livingston, Burnley, Bolton Wanderers, Greenock Morton, Carlisle United, Falkirk, Queen of the South and Dumbarton.

== Club career ==
=== Early career ===
McKee started his career in the youth team of Dundee United in 2000 at the age of seven. He spent five years at Tannadice Park and progressed well at the club but left in 2005 due to unhappiness and joined Livingston. He settled well into life at Almondvale, as he knew youth teammate Robert Snodgrass as they went to the same school, St Mungo's Academy in Glasgow. McKee had a successful season for the under-19s in the 2008–09 season scoring 13 goals in 17 starts as they won the league title for the second consecutive season. He signed full-time for the club in October 2008, and went with the first team squad on a training tour to Italy playing against Parma Reserves. In March 2009 he was part of the squad for the Scottish Division One matches against St Johnstone and Queen of the South. In the summer of 2009, Livingston went into administration and faced demotion to the Scottish Division Three. He made his debut for Livingston on 1 August 2009 in the Scottish League Cup in a 3–0 defeat to Albion Rovers, replacing Michael Torrance in the second half. He then played in the first league game of the season, a 2–0 win over Montrose, coming on as a second-half substitute for Anthony McParland.

=== Burnley ===
Burnley manager Owen Coyle brought McKee to Turf Moor in August 2009 and signed a two-year scholarship after training with the club in the summer. Burnley had to play Livingston in a pre-season friendly at Almondvale as part of the deal, and also pay a five-figure sum when he signed a professional contract. He played primarily in the youth team in his first season at the club, but did feature in six games in the Premier Reserve League scoring one goal against Bolton Wanderers. In the 2010–11 season he was top scorer for the youth team and also featured regularly in the reserve side. In June 2011, he signed his first professional contract with the club on a one-year deal after the end of his scholarship. He was involved with the first team in the 2011–12 pre-season games and played in his first game for the Clarets in a 0–0 draw with Oldham Athletic, coming on in the last minute for Ross Wallace. He was given the squad number 34 during pre-season. On 9 August 2011, McKee was named on the bench in a 6–3 win over Burton Albion in the Football League Cup first round. However, he was an unused substitute.

In April 2012, it announced that McKee was released at the end of his Contract by Burnley.

==== St Mirren (Loan spell) ====
On 23 August 2011, he joined Scottish Premier League club St Mirren on a four-month loan until January 2012. He made his debut for the club on 28 August 2011 in a 2–0 home defeat to Celtic, where he came on as a late substitute for Nigel Hasselbaink. Having made two appearances for St Mirren, McKee loan spell with the club ended, but manager Danny Lennon hopes that he will become a better player.

=== Bolton Wanderers ===
On 3 July, McKee tweeted that he had signed for Bolton Wanderers, reuniting with former Burnley manager, Owen Coyle. This was confirmed a day later by Bolton's official Twitter page and McKee was given number 35.

McKee was released by then Bolton boss Dougie Freedman at the end of the 2012–13 season, having made no appearance or even on the substitute bench in his Bolton career.

=== Greenock Morton ===
In May 2013, McKee joined Scottish club Greenock Morton, playing in the Scottish Championship. McKee signed a contract extension until summer 2015 in September 2013.

=== Carlisle United ===
McKee left Morton on a Bosman free transfer to join English side Carlisle United. He scored his first goal for Carlisle in an EFL Trophy tie against Fleetwood Town on 9 November 2016.

=== Falkirk ===
On transfer deadline day, 31 January 2017, McKee signed a 6-month deal to move back north to Falkirk, teaming up with long time friend Charlie Harris who was in the U23 squad as a physio. McKee commented "It was an easy decision. To come back up north and see Charlie clinched the deal". In November 2017 he received a four-match SFA ban for 'excessive misconduct' for his part in an incident involving Dunfermline's Dean Shiels during a match between the rival clubs two months previously.

=== Dumbarton ===
After leaving Falkirk and spending time with Dundalk McKee signed for Scottish League One club Dumbarton in July 2019. He enjoyed a successful season at the Rock, registering 15 assists and two goals before leaving the club at the end of his contract in July 2020.

=== Queen of the South ===
On 24 August 2020, McKee signed for Queen of the South until 31 May 2021.

=== Dumbarton ===
After only one season at the Dumfries club, McKee returned to Dumbarton on a two-year deal in June 2021. He made 57 appearances, scoring twice, in his second spell with the club before leaving in the summer of 2023.

=== Peterhead ===
On leaving Dumbarton, McKee signed for Scottish League Two side Peterhead on a two-year deal.

=== Cumnock Juniors ===
Following his departure from the Balmoral Stadium, McKee signed for Cumnock Juniors in July 2024.

== International ==
McKee has represented Scotland at under-16, under-17 and under-19 level. He was first called up to Scotland U19 squad in May 2011 for the two friendlies away to Denmark. He started in the first friendly on 10 May in Copenhagen, playing 70 minutes as Scotland lost 3–2. He was a substitute for the game two days later in Ballerup in another defeat, coming on in the second half for Rory McKenzie.

== Career statistics ==
As of 20:09, 21 November 2023 (UTC)

Appearances and goals by club, season and competition
Club	Season	League			National Cup		League Cup		Other		Total	
Club	Season	Division	Apps	Goals	Apps	Goals	Apps	Goals	Apps	Goals	Apps	Goals
Livingston	2009–10	Scottish Third Division	1	0	0	0	1	0	0	0	2	0
Burnley	2009–10	Premier League	0	0	0	0	0	0	—		0	0
Burnley	2010–11	Championship	0	0	0	0	0	0	—		0	0
Burnley	2011–12	Championship	0	0	0	0	0	0	—		0	0
Burnley	Total		0	0	0	0	0	0	—		0	0
St Mirren (loan)	2011–12	Scottish Premier League	2	0	0	0	0	0	—		2	0
Bolton Wanderers	2012–13	Championship	0	0	0	0	0	0	—		0	0
Greenock Morton	2013–14	Scottish Championship	14	0	1	0	2	0	1 (Note: Appearances in the Scottish Challenge Cup)	0	18	0
Greenock Morton	2014–15	Scottish League One	24	2	2	0	1	2	3	0	30	4
Greenock Morton	2015–16	Scottish Championship	26	2	4	2	0	0	1	0	31	4
Greenock Morton	Total		64	4	7	2	3	2	5	0	79	8
Carlisle United	2016–17	League Two	4	0	0	0	1	0	3 (Note: Appearances in the EFL Trophy)	1	8	1
Falkirk	2016–17	Scottish Championship	3	0	0	0	0	0	2 (Note: Appearances in the Premiership play-offs)	1	5	1
Falkirk	2017–18	Scottish Championship	21	4	3	0	5	3	2	0	31	7
Falkirk	2018–19	Scottish Championship	10	2	1	1	0	0	1	0	12	3
Falkirk	Total		34	6	4	1	5	3	5	1	48	11
Dumbarton	2019–20	Scottish League One	24	2	1	0	2	0	1	0	29	2
Queen of the South	2020–21	Scottish Championship	10	2	2	0	3	0	0	0	15	2
Dumbarton	2021–22	Scottish League One	21	0	2	1	1	0	1	0	25	1
Dumbarton	2022–23	Scottish League Two	24	1	3	0	4	0	3	0	33	1
Dumbarton	Total (two spells)		69	3	6	1	7	0	5	0	87	4
Peterhead	2023–24	Scottish League Two	11	1	0	0	2	0	3	0	16	1
Career totals			195	16	18	4	22	5	21	2	255	28

== Honours ==
Greenock Morton

- Scottish League One: Winners 2014–15

== See also ==
- St Mirren F.C. season 2011–12
- Greenock Morton F.C. season 2013–14 | 2014–15 | 2015–16
