= Conner Duthie =

Scottish footballer (born 1997)

Personal information
- Date of birth: 2 February 1997 (age 29)
- Place of birth: Edinburgh, Scotland
- Position: Midfielder

Youth career
- 2005-2013: Heart of Midlothian

Senior career*
Years	Team	Apps	(Gls)
2014–2016	Hibernian	1	(0)
2015–2016	→ Spartans (loan)	9	(3)
2016–2018	Dunfermline Athletic	5	(0)
2017	→ Stenhousemuir (loan)	11	(0)
2017–2018	→ Forfar Athletic (loan)	10	(0)
2018–2019	Stenhousemuir	30	(2)
2021–2022	Dumbarton	44	(7)
2022–2023	Clyde	8	(0)
2023–2025	Peterhead	1	(0)
- * Club domestic league appearances and goals as of 13:20, 1 September 2023 (UTC)

Conner Duthie (born 2 February 1997) is a Scottish footballer, who plays as a midfielder or striker. He has previously played for Hibernian, Dunfermline Athletic, Spartans, Stenhousemuir, Forfar Athletic, Dumbarton, Clyde, Peterhead and Tranent.

== Club career ==
Signed from Hearts, Duthie made one appearance for Hibernian in the 2014–15 season against Dumbarton. On 28 August 2015, Duthie was loaned to Spartans, however in January 2016 he was released by his parent club. After his release, Duthie started a trial period with Scottish League One side Dunfermline Athletic. He played in a number of Development League games, including a match against his former side Hibernian, where he scored the only goal of the game, giving the Pars youth side only their second victory in 12 matches. At the end of March 2016, he signed permanently with the East End Park side.

On 31 January 2017, Duthie moved on a development loan to Scottish League One side Stenhousemuir until the end of the 2016–17 season, and at the end of October 2017, he joined Forfar Athletic on a short-term loan deal until January 2018. Duthie was released by Dunfermline in May 2018, having made just 7 first-team appearances in two years.

Duthie signed for Stenhousemuir in June 2018, and he left the club at the end of the 2018–19 season. Duthie tested positive for having taken cannabis in a drug test taken after a League One match against Stranraer on 16 March 2019. He was subsequently banned from all competitive sport for two years. After completing his ban, Duthie joined Scottish League One side Dumbarton in March 2021 scoring his first goal for the club against former side Forfar Athletic in April 2021. He extended his deal with the Sons at the end of the campaign, having impressed new manager Stephen Farrell and was named the club's Player of the Year in April 2022. He left the club in May 2022 following their relegation to Scottish League Two.

On 12 May 2022, Duthie signed a one-year deal with Clyde. His season was disrupted after he underwent surgery for a hole in his heart. In June 2023 he left Clyde for Peterhead - but suffered a 'season ending injury' in the first league game of the season.

== Career statistics ==
As of 08:12, 8 May 2022 (UTC)

Appearances and goals by club, season and competition
Club	Season	League			FA Cup		League Cup		Other		Total	
Club	Season	Division	Apps	Goals	Apps	Goals	Apps	Goals	Apps	Goals	Apps	Goals
Hibernian	2014–15	Scottish Championship	1	0	0	0	0	0	0	0	1	0
Hibernian	2015–16	Scottish Championship	0	0	0	0	0	0	0	0	0	0
Hibernian	Total		1	0	0	0	0	0	0	0	1	0
Spartans (loan)	2015–16	Lowland Football League	9	3	2	0	—		2	0	13	3
Dunfermline Athletic	2015–16	Scottish League One	3	0	0	0	0	0	0	0	3	0
Dunfermline Athletic	2016–17	Scottish Championship	2	0	1	0	0	0	0	0	3	0
Dunfermline Athletic	2017–18	Scottish Championship	0	0	0	0	0	0	1 (Note: Appearance in the Scottish Challenge Cup)	0	1	0
Dunfermline Athletic	Total		5	0	1	0	0	0	1	0	7	0
Stenhousemuir (loan)	2016–17	Scottish League One	11	0	0	0	0	0	0	0	11	0
Forfar Athletic (loan)	2017–18	Scottish League One	10	0	0	0	0	0	0	0	11	0
Stenhousemuir	2018–19	Scottish League One	29	2	3	0	4	1	2	0	38	3
Dumbarton	2020–21	Scottish League One	9	1	1	0	0	0	3	0	13	1
Dumbarton	2021–22	Scottish League One	35	6	2	0	3	0	2	0	42	6
Dumbarton	Total		44	7	3	0	3	0	5	0	55	7
Clyde	2022–23	Scottish League One	0	0	0	0	0	0	0	0	0	0
Career Total			109	12	9	0	7	1	10	0	136	13
