= Patrick O'Neil (footballer) =

Scottish footballer (born 1992)

Personal information
- Full name: Patrick O'Neil
- Date of birth: 31 March 1992 (age 34)
- Place of birth: Glasgow, Scotland
- Position: Goalkeeper

Team information
- Current team: Dumbarton
- Number: 19

Senior career*
Years	Team	Apps	(Gls)
2014–2021	Brechin City	36	(0)
2021–22	Dumbarton	0	(0)
2022	→ Troon (loan)		
2024–2025	Dumbarton	8	(0)
- * Club domestic league appearances and goals as of 12:13, 2 February 2025 (UTC)

Patrick O'Neil (born 31 March 1992) is a Scottish professional footballer who most recently played as a goalkeeper for Scottish League Two side Dumbarton.

== Career statistics ==
As of 12:13, 2 February 2025 (UTC)

Appearances and goals by club, season and competition
Club	Season	League			FA Cup		League Cup		Other		Total	
Club	Season	Division	Apps	Goals	Apps	Goals	Apps	Goals	Apps	Goals	Apps	Goals
Brechin City	2014–15	Scottish League One	1	0	0	0	0	0	0	0	1	0
Brechin City	2015–16	Scottish League One	3	0	0	0	0	0	0	0	3	0
Brechin City	2016–17	Scottish League One	5	0	0	0	0	0	0	0	5	0
Brechin City	2017–18	Scottish Championship	6	0	0	0	0	0	0	0	6	0
Brechin City	2018–19	Scottish League One	14	0	0	0	0	0	1	0	15	0
Brechin City	2019–20	Scottish League Two	2	0	0	0	1	0	0	0	3	0
Brechin City	2020–21	Scottish League Two	5	0	0	0	1	0	0	0	6	0
Brechin City	Total		36	0	0	0	2	0	1	0	39	0
Dumbarton	2021–22	Scottish League One	0	0	0	0	0	0	0	0	0	0
Dumbarton	2023–24	Scottish League Two	1	0	0	0	0	0	0	0	1	0
Dumbarton	2024–25	Scottish League One	7	0	0	0	1	0	2	0	10	0
Career total			44	0	0	0	1	0	2	0	50	0
