= 2023–24 Scottish League Two =

Scottish League Two
- Season: 2023–24
- Dates: 5 August 2023 – 4 May 2024
- Champions: Stenhousemuir
- Promoted: Stenhousemuir, Dumbarton (via play-offs)
- Matches: 180
- Goals: 467 (2.59 per match)
- Top goalscorer: Blair Henderson; 18 goals
- Biggest home win: Peterhead 6–0 Elgin City (30 September 2023)
- Biggest away win: Stenhousemuir 1–6 Clyde (24 February 2024)
- Highest scoring: Dumbarton 4–4 Clyde (23 December 2023); The Spartans 2–6 Dumbarton (16 March 2024)
- Longest winning run: Stenhousemuir; 12 games
- Longest unbeaten run: Stenhousemuir; 17 games
- Longest winless run: Bonnyrigg Rose; Clyde; 10 games
- Longest losing run: Stranraer; 5 games
- Highest attendance: 1,512; Stenhousemuir 1–1 Bonnyrigg Rose (27 April 2024)
- Lowest attendance: 273; Stranraer 1–2 Elgin City (16 March 2024)
- Total attendance: 105,586
- Average attendance: 586
- All statistics correct as of 4 May 2024.

The 2023–24 Scottish League Two (known as cinch League Two for sponsorship reasons) was the eleventh season of Scottish League Two, the fourth tier of Scottish football. The season began on 5 August 2023.

Ten teams contested the league: Bonnyrigg Rose, Clyde, Dumbarton, East Fife, Elgin City, Forfar Athletic, Peterhead, Stenhousemuir, Stranraer and The Spartans.

== Teams ==
The following teams changed division after the 2022–23 season.

=== To League Two ===
Promoted from Lowland Football League

- The Spartans

Relegated from League One

- Clyde
- Peterhead

=== From League Two ===
Relegated to Lowland Football League

- Albion Rovers

Promoted to League One

- Annan Athletic
- Stirling Albion

=== Stadia and locations ===
| Bonnyrigg Rose | Clyde | Dumbarton | East Fife |
|---|---|---|---|
| New Dundas Park | New Douglas Park | Dumbarton Football Stadium | Bayview Stadium |
| Capacity: 3,000 | Capacity: 6,018 | Capacity: 2,020 | Capacity: 1,980 |
| Elgin City | Location of teams in 2023–24 Scottish League Two | | Forfar Athletic |
| Borough Briggs | Location of teams in 2023–24 Scottish League Two | | Station Park |
| Capacity: 4,520 | Location of teams in 2023–24 Scottish League Two | | Capacity: 6,777 |
| Peterhead | Stenhousemuir | Stranraer | The Spartans |
| Balmoor | Ochilview Park | Stair Park | Ainslie Park |
| Capacity: 3,150 | Capacity: 3,746 | Capacity: 4,178 | Capacity: 3,612 |

=== Personnel and kits ===
| Team | Manager | Captain | Kit manufacturer | Shirt sponsor |
|---|---|---|---|---|
| Bonnyrigg Rose | (Scotland) Calum Elliot | (Scotland) Jonathan Stewart | Puma | G. Fitzsimmons and Son (Home); Shepherd Chartered Surveyors (Away) |
| Clyde | (Scotland) Ian McCall | (Scotland) Barry Cuddihy | Puma | HomesBook Factoring (Home); Whitemoss Dental (Away) |
| Dumbarton | (Scotland) Stephen Farrell | (Scotland) Mark Durnan | Macron | Ice & Fire Wellness |
| East Fife | (Scotland) Dick Campbell | (Scotland) Stewart Murdoch | Erreà | BW Technology (Home); The Taxi Centre Fife (Away) |
| Elgin City | (Scotland) Allan Hale | (Scotland) Matthew Cooper | Joma | McDonald & Munro |
| Forfar Athletic | (Scotland) Ray McKinnon | (Scotland) Stuart Morrison | Pendle | Orchard Timber Products |
| Peterhead | (Scotland) Jordon Brown (Scotland) Ryan Strachan | (Scotland) Jason Brown | Puma | The Score Group |
| Stenhousemuir | (Scotland) Gary Naysmith | (Scotland) Gregor Buchanan | Uhlsport | LOC Hire |
| Stranraer | (Scotland) Scott Agnew | (Scotland) Grant Gallagher | Joma | Stena Line |
| The Spartans | (Scotland) Douglas Samuel | (Scotland) Kevin Waugh | Macron | J-TEQ EMS Solutions Ltd |

=== Managerial changes ===
| Team | Outgoing manager | Manner of departure | Date of vacancy | Position in table | Incoming manager | Date of appointment |
|---|---|---|---|---|---|---|
| Clyde | (Scotland) Jim Duffy | Appointed director of football | 24 May 2023 | Pre-season | (Northern Ireland) Brian McLean | 2 June 2023 |
| Elgin City | Charlie Charlesworth, Ross Draper and Stevie Dunn | End of interim spell | 25 May 2023 | Pre-season | (England) Ross Draper | 25 May 2023 |
| Elgin City | (England) Ross Draper | Resigned | 5 September 2023 | 9th | (Scotland) Barry Smith | 5 September 2023 |
| Clyde | (Northern Ireland) Brian McLean | Sacked | 22 October 2023 | 9th | (Scotland) Ian McCall | 15 November 2023 |
| Elgin City | (Scotland) Barry Smith | Mutual consent | 13 November 2023 | 9th | (Scotland) Allan Hale | 5 December 2023 |
| East Fife | (Scotland) Greig McDonald | Resigned | 5 February 2024 | 6th | (Scotland) Dick Campbell | 6 February 2024 |
| Bonnyrigg Rose | (Scotland) Robbie Horn | Sacked | 24 March 2024 | 8th | (Scotland) Calum Elliot | 25 March 2024 |

== League table ==
| Pos | Team | Pld | W | D | L | GF | GA | GD | Pts | Promotion, qualification or relegation |
|---|---|---|---|---|---|---|---|---|---|---|
| 1 | Stenhousemuir (C, P) | 36 | 18 | 14 | 4 | 50 | 31 | +19 | 68 | Promotion to League One |
| 2 | Peterhead | 36 | 16 | 12 | 8 | 58 | 39 | +19 | 60 | Qualification for the League One play-offs |
| 3 | The Spartans | 36 | 15 | 13 | 8 | 53 | 43 | +10 | 58 | Qualification for the League One play-offs |
| 4 | Dumbarton (O, P) | 36 | 16 | 9 | 11 | 56 | 44 | +12 | 57 | Qualification for the League One play-offs |
| 5 | East Fife | 36 | 11 | 11 | 14 | 46 | 47 | −1 | 44 | |
| 6 | Forfar Athletic | 36 | 9 | 15 | 12 | 38 | 45 | −7 | 42 | |
| 7 | Elgin City | 36 | 10 | 10 | 16 | 35 | 59 | −24 | 40 | |
| 8 | Bonnyrigg Rose | 36 | 9 | 12 | 15 | 47 | 48 | −1 | 39 | |
| 9 | Clyde | 36 | 9 | 11 | 16 | 46 | 58 | −12 | 38 | |
| 10 | Stranraer (O) | 36 | 9 | 9 | 18 | 38 | 53 | −15 | 36 | Qualification for the League Two play-off final |

Rules for classification: 1) Points; 2) Goal difference; 3) Goals scored; 4) Head-to-to head points; 5) Head-to-head goal difference; 6) Play-off (only for deciding promotion, play-off participation and relegation).
(C) Champions; (O) Play-off winners; (P) Promoted

== Results ==
Teams play each other four times, twice in the first half of the season (home and away) and twice in the second half of the season (home and away), making a total of 180 games, with each team playing 36.

=== First half of season (Matches 1–18) ===
| Home \ Away | BON | CLY | DUM | EFI | ELG | FOR | PET | STE | STR | SPA |
|---|---|---|---|---|---|---|---|---|---|---|
| Bonnyrigg Rose | — | 3–2 | 1–1 | 4–2 | 5–1 | 0–2 | 1–1 | 0–1 | 1–1 | 2–2 |
| Clyde | 0–2 | — | 0–4 | 0–3 | 2–1 | 0–0 | 1–2 | 1–2 | 2–2 | 1–2 |
| Dumbarton | 4–0 | 4–4 | — | 1–0 | 1–0 | 3–1 | 0–1 | 0–1 | 3–1 | 1–1 |
| East Fife | 0–3 | 2–0 | 0–1 | — | 4–0 | 1–1 | 0–3 | 0–2 | 4–0 | 0–3 |
| Elgin City | 2–0 | 2–1 | 2–0 | 1–1 | — | 1–0 | 2–1 | 1–1 | 0–1 | 0–4 |
| Forfar Athletic | 1–2 | 1–1 | 2–4 | 0–0 | 0–0 | — | 1–3 | 1–3 | 1–1 | 2–2 |
| Peterhead | 2–1 | 2–1 | 3–1 | 2–0 | 6–0 | 1–2 | — | 0–0 | 3–2 | 0–1 |
| Stenhousemuir | 1–0 | 2–2 | 2–4 | 2–1 | 2–0 | 0–0 | 2–0 | — | 5–0 | 3–2 |
| Stranraer | 3–1 | 1–0 | 5–0 | 1–1 | 3–1 | 0–2 | 2–1 | 0–3 | — | 3–4 |
| The Spartans | 2–2 | 1–1 | 2–0 | 2–2 | 2–1 | 1–0 | 1–2 | 0–1 | 3–0 | — |

Legend: Blue = home team win; Yellow = draw; Red = away team win.
For upcoming matches, an "a" indicates there is an article about the rivalry between the two participants.

=== Second half of season (Matches 19–36) ===
| Home \ Away | BON | CLY | DUM | EFI | ELG | FOR | PET | STE | STR | SPA |
|---|---|---|---|---|---|---|---|---|---|---|
| Bonnyrigg Rose | — | 1–2 | 1–1 | 0–2 | 2–0 | 4–0 | 2–2 | 0–1 | 0–0 | 0–1 |
| Clyde | 3–2 | — | 2–0 | 1–0 | 2–1 | 0–2 | 1–1 | 2–2 | 1–0 | 0–0 |
| Dumbarton | 2–0 | 1–0 | — | 1–2 | 2–2 | 2–2 | 1–0 | 0–0 | 2–1 | 0–0 |
| East Fife | 1–4 | 1–1 | 3–2 | — | 2–0 | 1–1 | 2–2 | 1–1 | 2–1 | 1–2 |
| Elgin City | 1–0 | 0–3 | 0–1 | 1–0 | — | 1–1 | 1–1 | 2–2 | 2–1 | 2–2 |
| Forfar Athletic | 0–0 | 2–1 | 0–2 | 2–1 | 2–1 | — | 3–3 | 1–1 | 2–0 | 1–0 |
| Peterhead | 0–0 | 4–1 | 2–1 | 1–1 | 1–1 | 2–1 | — | 2–1 | 2–0 | 0–1 |
| Stenhousemuir | 1–1 | 1–6 | 1–0 | 0–0 | 1–1 | 2–1 | 0–0 | — | 1–0 | 0–0 |
| Stranraer | 1–1 | 2–0 | 0–0 | 0–1 | 1–2 | 0–0 | 2–0 | 2–0 | — | 1–2 |
| The Spartans | 2–1 | 1–1 | 2–6 | 1–3 | 1–2 | 1–0 | 2–2 | 0–2 | 0–0 | — |

Legend: Blue = home team win; Yellow = draw; Red = away team win.
For upcoming matches, an "a" indicates there is an article about the rivalry between the two participants.

== Season statistics ==
=== Scoring ===
==== Top scorers ====
| Rank | Player | Club | Goals |
|---|---|---|---|
| 1 | (Scotland) Blair Henderson | The Spartans | 18 |
| 2 | (Scotland) Matthew Aitken | Stenhousemuir | 14 |
| 3 | (Scotland) Neil Martyniuk | Bonnyrigg Rose | 13 |
| 3 | (England) Nathan Austin | East Fife | 13 |
| 5 | (Scotland) Martin Rennie | Clyde | 12 |

== Awards ==
| Month | Manager of the Month | | Player of the Month | |
| Month | Manager | Club | Player | Club |
|---|---|---|---|---|
| August | (Scotland) Douglas Samuel | The Spartans | (Scotland) Jamie Dishington | The Spartans |
| September | (Scotland) Gary Naysmith | Stenhousemuir | (Scotland) Gregor Buchanan | Stenhousemuir |
| October | (Scotland) Douglas Samuel | The Spartans | (Scotland) Bradley Whyte | The Spartans |
| November | (Scotland) Gary Naysmith | Stenhousemuir | (Scotland) Matthew Aitken | Stenhousemuir |
| December | (Scotland) Gary Naysmith | Stenhousemuir | (Scotland) Matthew Aitken | Stenhousemuir |
| January | (Scotland) Gary Naysmith | Stenhousemuir | (Scotland) Blair Henderson | The Spartans |
| February | (Scotland) Ray McKinnon | Forfar Athletic | (Scotland) Martin Rennie | Clyde |
| March | (Scotland) Dick Campbell | East Fife | (Scotland) Alan Trouten | East Fife |
| April | (Scotland) Stephen Farrell | Dumbarton | (Scotland) Bradley Barrett | Bonnyrigg Rose |

== League Two play-offs ==
The Pyramid play-off was due to be contested between the champions of the 2023–24 Highland Football League and the 2023–24 Lowland Football League. East Kilbride secured their place in the play-offs as the Lowland Football League representative on 12 April 2024. Buckie Thistle won the Highland League on 20 April 2024. However, on 25 April 2024 the SFA confirmed that Buckie Thistle had not received the necessary Bronze licence to be able to compete in the SPFL, therefore the Pyramid play-off was cancelled and East Kilbride were automatically advanced to the League Two play-off final against Stranraer. Stranraer's victory in the final meant that they remained in League Two for the 2024–25 season.

=== Pyramid play-off ===
==== First leg ====
| 27 April 2024 | East Kilbride | Walkover | Buckie Thistle | East Kilbride |
| 15:00 | | | | Stadium: K-Park Training Academy |

==== Second leg ====
| 4 May 2024 | Buckie Thistle | Walkover | East Kilbride | Buckie |
| 15:00 | | | | Stadium: Victoria Park |

=== Final ===
==== First leg ====
| 11 May 2024 | East Kilbride | 2–2 | Stranraer | East Kilbride |
| 15:00 | Stirling 32'; Robertson 71' | | McIntosh 45+2'; Ross 60' | Stadium: K-Park Training Academy; Attendance: 652; Referee: Dan McFarlane |

==== Second leg ====
| 18 May 2024 | Stranraer | 3–1 (a.e.t.) (5–3 agg.) | East Kilbride | Stranraer |
| 15:00 | Gallagher 44'; Ross 117'; Gilmartin 120+1' | | Samson 76' | Stadium: Stair Park; Attendance: 1,871; Referee: Craig Napier |
