= 2021–22 Scottish League One =

Scottish League One
- Season: 2021–22
- Dates: 31 July 2021 – 30 April 2022
- Champions: Cove Rangers
- Promoted: Cove Rangers; Queen's Park
- Relegated: Dumbarton; East Fife
- Matches: 180
- Goals: 507 (2.82 per match)
- Top goalscorer: Mitch Megginson; 18 goals
- Biggest home win: Queen's Park 6–0 Falkirk (4 December 2021)
- Biggest away win: Clyde 0–5 Montrose (16 October 2021); Clyde 0–5 Airdrieonians (23 April 2022)
- Highest scoring: Falkirk 6–2 Dumbarton (8 January 2022)
- Longest winning run: Cove Rangers; 9 games
- Longest unbeaten run: Cove Rangers; 26 games
- Longest winless run: East Fife; 12 games
- Longest losing run: East Fife; 7 games
- Highest attendance: 4,104; Falkirk 3–1 East Fife (26 February 2022)
- Lowest attendance: 193; Montrose 2–1 Airdrieonians (7 December 2021)
- All statistics correct as of 30 April 2022.

The 2021–22 Scottish League One (known as cinch League One for sponsorship reasons) was the ninth season of Scottish League One, the third tier of Scottish football. The season began on 31 July.

Ten teams contested the league: Airdrieonians, Alloa Athletic, Clyde, Cove Rangers, Dumbarton, East Fife, Falkirk, Montrose, Peterhead and Queen's Park.

== Teams ==
The following teams changed division after the 2020–21 season.

=== To League One ===
Promoted from League Two

- Queen's Park

Relegated from the Championship

- Alloa Athletic

=== From League One ===
Relegated to League Two

- Forfar Athletic

Promoted to the Championship

- Partick Thistle

=== Stadia and locations ===
Airdrieonians	Alloa Athletic	Clyde	Cove Rangers
Excelsior Stadium	Recreation Park	Broadwood Stadium	Balmoral Stadium
Capacity: 10,101	Capacity: 3,100	Capacity: 8,086	Capacity: 2,602
Dumbarton	Location of teams in 2021–22 Scottish League One		East Fife
Dumbarton Football Stadium	Location of teams in 2021–22 Scottish League One		Bayview Stadium
Capacity: 2,020	Location of teams in 2021–22 Scottish League One		Capacity: 1,980
Falkirk	Montrose	Peterhead	Queen's Park
Falkirk Stadium	Links Park	Balmoor	Firhill Stadium
Capacity: 7,937	Capacity: 4,936	Capacity: 3,150	Capacity: 10,102

=== Personnel and kits ===
Team	Manager	Captain	Kit manufacturer	Shirt sponsor
Airdrieonians	(Scotland) Ian Murray	(Scotland) Callum Fordyce	Umbro	Holemasters
Alloa Athletic	(Scotland) Brian Rice	(Scotland) Andy Graham	Pendle	Northern Gas and Power
Clyde	(Scotland) Danny Lennon	(Scotland) Ally Love	Puma	HomesBook Factoring (Home); Whitemoss Dental (Away)
Cove Rangers	(Scotland) Paul Hartley	(Scotland) Mitch Megginson	Adidas	ACE Group
Dumbarton	(Scotland) Stephen Farrell	(Scotland) Stuart Carswell	Joma	Moreroom Extensions Ltd (Home); Four Architects (Away)
East Fife	(Scotland) Stevie Crawford	(Scotland) Kevin Smith	Joma	BW Technology
Falkirk	(Scotland) Kenny Miller (interim)	(Scotland) Paul Watson	Puma	Clarke ePOS (UK) Ltd
Montrose	(Scotland) Stewart Petrie	(Scotland) Paul Watson	Hummel	Carnegie Fuels Ltd
Peterhead	(Scotland) Jim McInally	(Scotland) Scott Brown	Adidas	The Score Group
Queen's Park	(Netherlands) Marijn Beuker (interim)	(Scotland) Michael Doyle	Admiral	Irn-Bru

=== Managerial changes ===
Team	Outgoing manager	Manner of departure	Date of vacancy	Position in table	Incoming manager	Date of appointment
Alloa Athletic	(Scotland) Peter Grant	Sacked	1 May 2021	Pre-season	(Scotland) Barry Ferguson	27 May 2021
Falkirk	(Scotland) Gary Holt	End of interim spell	6 May 2021	Pre-season	(Scotland) Paul Sheerin	28 May 2021
Queen's Park	(Scotland) Ray McKinnon	Mutual consent	10 May 2021	Pre-season	(Scotland) Laurie Ellis	22 May 2021
Dumbarton	(Scotland) Jim Duffy	End of contract	24 May 2021	Pre-season	(Scotland) Stephen Farrell	29 May 2021
East Fife	(Scotland) Darren Young	Sacked	21 November 2021	10th	(Scotland) Stevie Crawford	30 November 2021
Falkirk	(Scotland) Paul Sheerin	Sacked	5 December 2021	5th	(Scotland) Martin Rennie	10 December 2021
Queen's Park	(Scotland) Laurie Ellis	Sacked	31 December 2021	4th	(Netherlands) Marijn Beuker (interim)	31 December 2021
Alloa Athletic	(Scotland) Barry Ferguson	Resigned	14 February 2022	8th	(Scotland) Brian Rice	21 February 2022
Falkirk	(Scotland) Martin Rennie	Left	14 April 2022	5th	(Scotland) Kenny Miller (interim)	14 April 2022

== League summary ==
=== League table ===
Pos	Team	Pld	W	D	L	GF	GA	GD	Pts	Promotion, qualification or relegation
1	Cove Rangers (C, P)	36	23	10	3	73	32	+41	79	Promotion to the Championship
2	Airdrieonians	36	21	9	6	68	37	+31	72	Qualification for the Championship play-offs
3	Montrose	36	15	14	7	53	36	+17	59	Qualification for the Championship play-offs
4	Queen's Park (O, P)	36	11	18	7	51	36	+15	51	Qualification for the Championship play-offs
5	Alloa Athletic	36	12	9	15	49	57	−8	45	
6	Falkirk	36	12	8	16	49	55	−6	44	
7	Peterhead	36	11	9	16	46	51	−5	42	
8	Clyde	36	9	12	15	39	62	−23	39	
9	Dumbarton (R)	36	9	7	20	48	71	−23	34	Qualification for the League One play-offs
10	East Fife (R)	36	5	8	23	31	70	−39	23	Relegation to League Two

Rules for classification: 1) Points; 2) Goal difference; 3) Goals scored; 4) Head-to-to head points; 5) Head-to-head goal difference; 6) Play-off (only for deciding promotion, play-off participation and relegation).
(C) Champions; (O) Play-off winners; (P) Promoted; (R) Relegated

== Results ==
=== Matches 1–18 ===
Teams play each other twice, once at home and once away.

Home \ Away	AIR	ALO	CLY	COV	DUM	EFI	FAL	MON	PET	QPA
Airdrieonians	—	2–1	2–1	0–2	3–2	3–0	1–2	0–3	3–1	1–0
Alloa Athletic	2–1	—	0–1	1–3	1–2	3–1	2–0	2–2	2–4	1–1
Clyde	2–2	2–1	—	2–1	0–3	3–1	1–3	0–5	2–2	2–2
Cove Rangers	1–0	3–0	3–0	—	2–0	5–2	1–1	1–1	3–0	3–3
Dumbarton	2–2	1–1	1–1	1–3	—	5–0	0–3	1–3	2–3	0–3
East Fife	0–1	1–1	0–2	4–2	2–1	—	0–2	0–2	3–0	1–1
Falkirk	0–3	1–1	3–0	0–3	1–2	2–1	—	0–1	2–1	0–1
Montrose	2–1	0–2	2–2	0–0	1–2	4–1	2–2	—	1–0	1–1
Peterhead	2–3	2–0	3–2	0–1	5–0	1–1	0–0	0–0	—	2–1
Queen's Park	0–0	3–4	0–0	2–0	3–0	1–1	6–0	1–1	3–2	—

Legend: Blue = home team win; Yellow = draw; Red = away team win.
For upcoming matches, an "a" indicates there is an article about the rivalry between the two participants.

=== Matches 19–36 ===
Teams play each other twice, once at home and once away.

Home \ Away	AIR	ALO	CLY	COV	DUM	EFI	FAL	MON	PET	QPA
Airdrieonians	—	3–1	1–1	1–1	3–2	3–0	3–2	4–1	1–1	2–0
Alloa Athletic	0–2	—	1–0	2–2	2–3	1–3	0–3	4–1	1–0	1–1
Clyde	0–5	2–1	—	0–1	1–3	2–0	1–1	2–1	0–3	1–1
Cove Rangers	1–1	3–0	4–1	—	1–0	4–2	2–0	1–0	5–2	0–0
Dumbarton	0–1	1–2	2–1	2–2	—	2–0	0–2	0–0	1–1	0–3
East Fife	0–2	0–3	0–0	2–3	2–0	—	1–3	0–2	0–0	1–1
Falkirk	1–4	1–2	1–2	0–2	6–2	3–1	—	0–3	1–1	1–1
Montrose	2–2	1–1	1–1	1–2	1–1	0–0	2–1	—	2–0	2–1
Peterhead	0–1	0–1	1–1	0–1	4–3	1–0	1–0	0–1	—	2–1
Queen's Park	1–1	1–1	1–0	1–1	2–1	1–0	1–1	0–1	2–1	—

Legend: Blue = home team win; Yellow = draw; Red = away team win.
For upcoming matches, an "a" indicates there is an article about the rivalry between the two participants.

== Season statistics ==
=== Scoring ===
==== Top scorers ====
As of 30 April 2022

Rank	Player	Club	Goals
1	(Scotland) Mitch Megginson	Cove Rangers	18
2	(Scotland) Rory McAllister	Cove Rangers	16
3	(Scotland) Calum Gallagher	Airdrieonians	15
3	(Scotland) David Goodwillie	Clyde	15
3	(Scotland) Graham Webster	Montrose	15

== Awards ==
Month	Manager of the Month		Player of the Month	
Month	Manager	Club	Player	Club
August	(Scotland) Laurie Ellis	Queen's Park	(Scotland) Simon Murray	Queen's Park
September	(Scotland) Stephen Farrell	Dumbarton	(Scotland) Callum Wilson	Dumbarton
October	(Scotland) Stewart Petrie	Montrose	(Scotland) Rory McAllister	Cove Rangers
November	(Scotland) Paul Hartley	Cove Rangers	(Scotland) Mitch Megginson	Cove Rangers
December	(Scotland) Paul Hartley	Cove Rangers	(Scotland) Blair Yule	Cove Rangers
January	(Scotland) Ian Murray	Airdrieonians	(Scotland) Dylan Easton	Airdrieonians
February	(Scotland) Ian Murray	Airdrieonians	(Scotland) Rhys McCabe	Airdrieonians
March	(Scotland) Paul Hartley	Cove Rangers	(Scotland) Callum Smith	Airdrieonians
April	(Scotland) Paul Hartley	Cove Rangers	(Scotland) Calum Gallagher	Airdrieonians

== League One play-offs ==
The semi-finals were contested by the teams placed second to fourth in Scottish League Two, as well as the team placed ninth in Scottish League One. The winners advanced to the final, with the highest-ranked team hosting the second leg.

=== Bracket ===
Semifinals
1	Dumbarton	1	1	2
4	Edinburgh City	4	1	5
3	Forfar Athletic	0	1	1
2	Annan Athletic	1	1	2

Final
Annan Athletic	0	2	2
Edinburgh City	2	1	3

=== Semi-finals ===
==== First leg ====
3 May 2022	Edinburgh City	4–1	Dumbarton	Edinburgh
19:45	See 11', 71'; Buchanan 27' (o.g.); Robertson 90'		MacLean 61'	Stadium: Ainslie Park; Attendance: 630; Referee: Chris Graham

3 May 2022	Annan Athletic	1–0	Forfar Athletic	Annan
19:45	Garrity 31'			Stadium: Galabank; Attendance: 608; Referee: Lloyd Wilson

==== Second leg ====
7 May 2022	Dumbarton	1–1 (2–5 agg.)	Edinburgh City	Dumbarton
15:00	Syvertsen 59'		Shanley 64'	Stadium: Dumbarton Football Stadium; Attendance: 637; Referee: Gavin Duncan

7 May 2022	Forfar Athletic	1–1 (1–2 agg.)	Annan Athletic	Forfar
15:00	McCluskey 32'		Wallace 88' (pen.)	Stadium: Station Park; Attendance: 886; Referee: Steven Kirkland

=== Final ===
==== First leg ====
10 May 2022	Edinburgh City	2–0	Annan Athletic	Edinburgh
19:30	Murray 50'; Shanley 62'			Stadium: Ainslie Park; Attendance: 1,008; Referee: Colin Steven

==== Second leg ====
13 May 2022	Annan Athletic	2–1 (2–3 agg.)	Edinburgh City	Annan
19:30	Wallace 6' (pen.); Goss 20'		Murray 53'	Stadium: Galabank; Attendance: 1,152; Referee: Euan Anderson
