= Kalvin Orsi =

Scottish footballer

Personal information
- Full name: Kalvin Orsi
- Date of birth: 15 April 1997 (age 29)
- Place of birth: Yoker, Scotland
- Position: Winger

Team information
- Current team: Hamilton Academical
- Number: 11

Youth career
- -2005: Celtic
- 2005-2009: Livingston
- 2009–2016: Aberdeen
- Southside FC

Senior career*
| Years | Team | Apps | (Gls) |
| 2016–2017 | St Mirren | 0 | (0) |
| 2017 | → Queen's Park (loan) | 11 | (1) |
| 2017–2019 | Brechin City | 64 | (5) |
| 2019–2021 | Greenock Morton | 31 | (5) |
| 2021–2025 | Dumbarton | 128 | (6) |
| 2025–2026 | Alloa Athletic | 22 | (1) |
| 2026– | Hamilton Academical | 5 | (0) |
- * Club domestic league appearances and goals as of 18 October 2026

Kalvin Orsi (born 15 April 1997) is a Scottish footballer who plays as a winger for Scottish League One side Hamilton Academical. Orsi, who began his career with Aberdeen's youth sides, has previously played for St Mirren, Queen's Park, Greenock Morton, Brechin City, Dumbarton and Alloa Athletic.

== Career ==
Orsi began his career in Aberdeen's youth sides, playing with the club for six seasons, without making an appearance for the senior side.

After his release by Aberdeen in May 2017, he signed a deal with Scottish Championship club St Mirren. He made his debut for St Mirren on 29 November 2016, as a substitute in a Scottish Cup match at home to Spartans. Orsi was loaned out to Scottish League One club Queen's Park for the second half of the 2016–17 season, and on his return was released by St Mirren.

Following a successful trial period, Orsi signed for recently promoted Scottish Championship side Brechin City on 14 July 2017.

Orsi signed with Greenock Morton in May 2019. After two seasons at Cappielow, Orsi joined Dumbarton in June 2021 - signing a two-year deal with the club. He signed a new one year deal in the summer of 2023, turning down offers from elsewhere to stay with the Sons. After helping the club win promotion to Scottish League One, Orsi extended his contract for a fourth season at The Rock in June 2024. After three league goals in his first 111 games for the club, Orsi scored his first brace as a Dumbarton player in a 2-0 victory against Kelty Hearts in December 2024. He left the club for Alloa Athletic in the summer of 2025.

On 26 June 2026, Orsi signed a two-year contract with Scottish League One side Hamilton Academical.

== Career statistics ==
As of 15:44, 3 May 2025 (UTC)

Appearances and goals by club, season and competition
| Club | Season | League | | | Scottish Cup | | League Cup | | Other | | Total | |
| Club | Season | Division | Apps | Goals | Apps | Goals | Apps | Goals | Apps | Goals | Apps | Goals |
|---|---|---|---|---|---|---|---|---|---|---|---|---|
| Aberdeen | 2014–15 | Scottish Premiership | 0 | 0 | 0 | 0 | 0 | 0 | 0 | 0 | 0 | 0 |
| Aberdeen | 2015–16 | Scottish Premiership | 0 | 0 | 0 | 0 | 0 | 0 | 0 | 0 | 0 | 0 |
| Aberdeen | Total | | 0 | 0 | 0 | 0 | 0 | 0 | 0 | 0 | 0 | 0 |
| St Mirren | 2016–17 | Scottish Championship | 0 | 0 | 1 | 0 | 0 | 0 | 0 | 0 | 1 | 0 |
| Queen's Park (loan) | 2016–17 | Scottish League One | 11 | 1 | 0 | 0 | 0 | 0 | 0 | 0 | 11 | 1 |
| Brechin City | 2017–18 | Scottish Championship | 33 | 4 | 2 | 0 | 4 | 0 | 1 (Note: Appearance in the Scottish Challenge Cup) | 0 | 40 | 4 |
| Brechin City | 2018–19 | Scottish League One | 31 | 1 | 1 | 0 | 4 | 0 | 1 | 0 | 37 | 1 |
| Brechin City | Total | | 64 | 5 | 3 | 0 | 8 | 0 | 2 | 0 | 77 | 5 |
| Greenock Morton | 2019–20 | Scottish Championship | 12 | 2 | 0 | 0 | 1 | 0 | 1 | 0 | 14 | 2 |
| Greenock Morton | 2020–21 | Scottish Championship | 19 | 3 | 3 | 0 | 2 | 0 | 1 | 0 | 22 | 3 |
| Greenock Morton | Total | | 31 | 5 | 3 | 0 | 3 | 0 | 2 | 0 | 36 | 5 |
| Dumbarton | 2021–22 | Scottish League One | 36 | 2 | 1 | 0 | 1 | 0 | 3 | 0 | 41 | 2 |
| Dumbarton | 2022–23 | Scottish League Two | 33 | 0 | 3 | 0 | 4 | 0 | 2 | 0 | 42 | 0 |
| Dumbarton | 2023–24 | Scottish League Two | 28 | 1 | 3 | 0 | 0 | 0 | 6 | 0 | 37 | 1 |
| Dumbarton | 2024–25 | Scottish League One | 31 | 3 | 2 | 0 | 4 | 1 | 2 | 0 | 39 | 4 |
| Dumbarton | Total | | 128 | 6 | 9 | 0 | 9 | 1 | 13 | 0 | 159 | 7 |
| Alloa Athletic | 2025-26 | Scottish League One | 0 | 0 | 0 | 0 | 0 | 0 | 0 | 0 | 0 | 0 |
| Career total | | | 234 | 17 | 16 | 0 | 20 | 1 | 16 | 0 | 287 | 18 |
