= 2022–23 Scottish League Two =

Scottish League Two
- Season: 2022–23
- Dates: 30 July 2022 – 6 May 2023
- Champions: Stirling Albion
- Promoted: Stirling Albion; Annan Athletic (via play-offs)
- Relegated: Albion Rovers
- Matches: 180
- Goals: 489 (2.72 per match)
- Top goalscorer: Tommy Goss; 23 goals
- Biggest home win: East Fife 8–0 Stranraer (15 April 2023)
- Biggest away win: Elgin City 0–4 Dumbarton (12 November 2022); Bonnyrigg Rose 0–4 Albion Rovers (7 January 2023); Stranraer 0–4 Albion Rovers (14 January 2023); Dumbarton 1–5 Albion Rovers (18 March 2023)
- Highest scoring: East Fife 8–0 Stranraer (15 April 2023)
- Longest winning run: Dumbarton; 7 games
- Longest unbeaten run: Stirling Albion; 19 games
- Longest winless run: Stenhousemuir; 9 games
- Longest losing run: Elgin City; 6 games
- Highest attendance: 2,057; Bonnyrigg Rose 3–0 Elgin City (6 May 2023)
- Lowest attendance: 219; Albion Rovers 0–2 Forfar Athletic (17 September 2022)
- Total attendance: 101,794
- Average attendance: 565
- All statistics correct as of 6 May 2023.

The 2022–23 Scottish League Two (known as cinch League Two for sponsorship reasons) was the tenth season of Scottish League Two, the fourth tier of Scottish football.

Ten teams contested the league: Albion Rovers, Annan Athletic, Bonnyrigg Rose, Dumbarton, East Fife, Elgin City, Forfar Athletic, Stenhousemuir, Stirling Albion and Stranraer.

== Teams ==
The following teams changed division after the 2021–22 season.

=== To League Two ===
Promoted from Lowland Football League

- Bonnyrigg Rose

Relegated from League One

- East Fife
- Dumbarton

=== From League Two ===
Relegated to Lowland Football League

- Cowdenbeath

Promoted to League One

- Kelty Hearts
- Edinburgh City

=== Stadia and locations ===
Albion Rovers	Annan Athletic	Bonnyrigg Rose	Dumbarton
Cliftonhill	Galabank	New Dundas Park	Dumbarton Football Stadium
Capacity: 1,238	Capacity: 2,504	Capacity: 3,000	Capacity: 2,020
East Fife	Location of teams in 2022–23 Scottish League Two		Elgin City
Bayview Stadium	Location of teams in 2022–23 Scottish League Two		Borough Briggs
Capacity: 1,980	Location of teams in 2022–23 Scottish League Two		Capacity: 4,520
Forfar Athletic	Stenhousemuir	Stirling Albion	Stranraer
Station Park	Ochilview Park	Forthbank Stadium	Stair Park
Capacity: 6,777	Capacity: 3,746	Capacity: 3,808	Capacity: 4,178

=== Personnel and kits ===
Team	Manager	Captain	Kit manufacturer	Shirt sponsor
Albion Rovers	(Scotland) Sandy Clark	(Scotland) Sean Fagan	Joma	CompliancePath
Annan Athletic	(Republic of Ireland) Peter Murphy	(England) Steven Swinglehurst	EV2 Sportswear	M & S Engineering
Bonnyrigg Rose	(Scotland) Robbie Horn	(Scotland) Jonathan Stewart	Puma	G. Fitzsimmons and Son (Home); Shepherd Chartered Surveyors (Away)
Dumbarton	(Scotland) Stephen Farrell	(Scotland) Gregor Buchanan	Macron	No Sponsor
East Fife	(Scotland) Greig McDonald	(Scotland) Stewart Murdoch	Joma	TBC (Home); The Taxi Centre Fife (Away)
Elgin City	Charlie Charlesworth, Ross Draper and Stevie Dunn (interim)	(Scotland) Matthew Cooper	Joma	McDonald & Munro
Forfar Athletic	(Scotland) Ray McKinnon	(Scotland) Craig Slater	Pendle	Orchard Timber Products
Stenhousemuir	(Scotland) Gary Naysmith	(Scotland) Sean Crighton	Puma	LOC Hire
Stirling Albion	(Scotland) Darren Young	(Scotland) Ross McGeachie	Joma	Prudential
Stranraer	(Scotland) Scott Agnew	(Scotland) Grant Gallagher	Joma	Stena Line

=== Managerial changes ===
Team	Outgoing manager	Manner of departure	Date of vacancy	Position in table	Incoming manager	Date of appointment
East Fife	(Scotland) Stevie Crawford	Signed by Dundee United	25 September 2022	4th	(Scotland) Greig McDonald	25 October 2022
Forfar Athletic	(Scotland) Gary Irvine	Sacked	9 November 2022	10th	(Scotland) Ray McKinnon	10 November 2022
Stenhousemuir	(Scotland) Stephen Swift	Sacked	7 December 2022	6th	(Scotland) Gary Naysmith	3 January 2023
Albion Rovers	(Scotland) Brian Reid	Sacked	25 March 2023	10th	(Scotland) Sandy Clark	28 March 2023
Elgin City	(Scotland) Gavin Price	Sacked	8 April 2023	10th	(Scotland) Charlie Charlesworth, Ross Draper and Stevie Dunn (interim)	10 April 2023
Stranraer	(Scotland) Jamie Hamill	Sacked	16 April 2023	7th	(Scotland) Scott Agnew	17 April 2023

== League table ==
Pos	Team	Pld	W	D	L	GF	GA	GD	Pts	Promotion, qualification or relegation
1	Stirling Albion (C, P)	36	21	10	5	67	37	+30	73	Promotion to League One
2	Dumbarton	36	18	8	10	49	39	+10	62	Qualification for the League One play-offs
3	Annan Athletic (O, P)	36	14	9	13	61	51	+10	51	Qualification for the League One play-offs
4	East Fife	36	14	8	14	54	50	+4	50	Qualification for the League One play-offs
5	Forfar Athletic	36	13	9	14	37	43	−6	48	
6	Stenhousemuir	36	12	11	13	51	55	−4	47	
7	Stranraer	36	12	9	15	43	57	−14	45	
8	Bonnyrigg Rose	36	11	9	16	36	47	−11	42	
9	Elgin City	36	11	7	18	44	62	−18	40	
10	Albion Rovers (R)	36	11	6	19	47	48	−1	39	Qualification for the League Two play-off final

Rules for classification: 1) Points; 2) Goal difference; 3) Goals scored; 4) Head-to-to head points; 5) Head-to-head goal difference; 6) Play-off (only for deciding promotion, play-off participation and relegation).
(C) Champions; (O) Play-off winners; (P) Promoted; (R) Relegated

== Results ==
=== Matches 1–18 ===
Teams play each other twice, once at home and once away.

Home \ Away	ALB	ANN	BON	DUM	EFI	ELG	FOR	STE	STI	STR
Albion Rovers	—	2–2	2–1	1–2	0–1	3–0	0–2	2–2	1–1	1–0
Annan Athletic	5–1	—	4–0	0–1	2–2	1–3	2–1	2–1	1–2	1–1
Bonnyrigg Rose	0–2	2–0	—	1–1	1–4	2–3	2–0	2–4	1–0	3–2
Dumbarton	1–1	4–0	1–0	—	2–0	2–1	2–2	1–0	2–0	2–0
East Fife	2–3	1–3	0–3	0–1	—	2–1	1–0	1–2	1–2	1–3
Elgin City	1–0	5–1	2–0	0–4	1–3	—	0–1	2–1	1–2	2–2
Forfar Athletic	1–0	1–4	1–1	0–0	1–3	2–2	—	1–2	1–4	2–0
Stenhousemuir	1–0	2–2	1–1	1–3	2–2	3–3	1–2	—	1–3	3–1
Stirling Albion	1–1	0–2	2–1	6–0	3–1	2–2	2–0	3–0	—	4–1
Stranraer	2–1	1–0	2–2	3–2	2–2	2–3	1–0	3–2	3–1	—

Legend: Blue = home team win; Yellow = draw; Red = away team win.
For upcoming matches, an "a" indicates there is an article about the rivalry between the two participants.

=== Matches 19–36 ===
Teams play each other twice, once at home and once away.

Home \ Away	ALB	ANN	BON	DUM	EFI	ELG	FOR	STE	STI	STR
Albion Rovers	—	0–2	0–1	0–1	0–1	3–0	0–1	3–1	2–0	0–1
Annan Athletic	4–0	—	0–0	3–1	3–0	4–1	0–2	2–3	2–2	0–0
Bonnyrigg Rose	0–4	1–2	—	0–2	1–1	3–0	1–1	0–1	1–2	1–0
Dumbarton	1–5	2–1	1–0	—	1–0	1–2	0–1	1–2	0–0	1–1
East Fife	2–1	0–1	0–0	2–0	—	2–0	3–2	1–1	1–1	8–0
Elgin City	1–1	1–1	0–1	1–0	1–2	—	2–0	1–1	0–3	0–1
Forfar Athletic	2–1	2–1	0–1	2–1	1–0	0–1	—	1–1	0–0	2–1
Stenhousemuir	2–0	2–1	0–0	1–1	1–2	2–0	1–1	—	0–1	2–1
Stirling Albion	3–2	3–1	2–1	2–2	2–2	1–0	2–1	3–1	—	1–0
Stranraer	0–4	1–1	0–1	0–2	2–0	3–1	0–0	2–0	1–1	—

Legend: Blue = home team win; Yellow = draw; Red = away team win.
For upcoming matches, an "a" indicates there is an article about the rivalry between the two participants.

== Season statistics ==
=== Scoring ===
==== Top scorers ====
Rank	Player	Club	Goals
1	(Scotland) Tommy Goss	Annan Athletic	23
2	(Scotland) Charlie Reilly	Albion Rovers	22
3	(Scotland) Dale Carrick	Stirling Albion	19
4	(Scotland) Kane Hester	Elgin City	18
5	(Scotland) Matty Yates	Stenhousemuir	14

== Awards ==
Month	Manager of the Month		Player of the Month	
Month	Manager	Club	Player	Club
August	(Scotland) Stephen Farrell	Dumbarton	(Scotland) Declan Byrne	Dumbarton
September/October	(Scotland) Darren Young	Stirling Albion	(Scotland) Kane Hester	Elgin City
November	(Scotland) Stephen Farrell	Dumbarton	(Scotland) Charlie Reilly	Albion Rovers
December	(Scotland) Stephen Farrell	Dumbarton	(Scotland) Chris Johnston	Annan Athletic
January	(Scotland) Ray McKinnon	Forfar Athletic	(Scotland) Charlie Reilly	Albion Rovers
February	(Scotland) Gary Naysmith	Stenhousemuir	(Scotland) Matty Yates	Stenhousemuir
March	(Scotland) Greig McDonald	East Fife	(Scotland) Tommy Goss	Annan Athletic
April	(Scotland) Darren Young	Stirling Albion	(Scotland) Dale Carrick	Stirling Albion

The SPFL League Two manager of the year was Darren Young of Stirling Albion.

The SPFL League Two player of the year was Dale Carrick of Stirling Albion.

== League Two play-offs ==
The Pyramid play-off was contested between the champions of the 2022–23 Highland Football League and the 2022–23 Lowland Football League. The Spartans secured their place in the play-offs as the Lowland Football League representative on 8 April 2023. Brechin City secured their place in the play-offs as the Highland Football League representative on 22 April 2023. The winners, The Spartans, then faced the bottom club Albion Rovers in the League Two play-off final. The Spartans won 2–1 over two legs, being promoted to League Two for the 2023–24 season as a result, with Albion Rovers relegated to the Lowland League.

=== Pyramid play-off ===
==== First leg ====
29 April 2023	The Spartans	1–0	Brechin City	Edinburgh
15:00	Henderson 90'			Stadium: Ainslie Park; Attendance: 2,020; Referee: Graham Grainger

==== Second leg ====
6 May 2023	Brechin City	3–2 (3–3 agg.) (3–4 p)	The Spartans	Brechin
15:00	MacLeod 45'; Inglis 61'; Biabi 65'		Whyte 15'; Henderson 55'	Stadium: Glebe Park; Attendance: 1,900; Referee: Grant Irvine
	Penalties
	Inglis (penalty scored); McGrath (penalty scored); Bain (penalty scored); Loudon (penalty missed); McHattie (penalty missed)		(penalty scored) Henderson; (penalty scored) Russell; (penalty scored) Brown; (penalty scored) Dishington

=== Final ===
==== First leg ====
13 May 2023	The Spartans	1–1	Albion Rovers	Edinburgh
15:00	Leslie 66' (o.g.)		Graham 39'	Stadium: Ainslie Park; Attendance: 2,120; Referee: Peter Stuart

==== Second leg ====
20 May 2023	Albion Rovers	0–1 (1–2 agg.)	The Spartans	Coatbridge
15:00			Henderson 16' (pen.)	Stadium: Cliftonhill; Attendance: 1,250; Referee: Matthew McDermid
