= Ross MacLean =

Scottish footballer

Personal information
- Date of birth: 13 March 1997 (age 29)
- Place of birth: Bellshill, Scotland
- Position: Midfielder

Team information
- Current team: Forfar Athletic
- Number: 7

Senior career*
Years	Team	Apps	(Gls)
2014–2019	Motherwell	16	(0)
2018–2019	→ Greenock Morton (loan)	16	(1)
2019–2020	Falkirk	22	(0)
2020–2021	Queen's Park	22	(2)
2021–2024	Dumbarton	68	(12)
2024–	Forfar Athletic	30	(2)
- * Club domestic league appearances and goals as of 4 May 2026

Ross MacLean (born 13 March 1997) is a Scottish footballer who plays as a midfielder for Scottish League Two side Forfar Athletic. MacLean has previously played for Greenock Morton, Motherwell, Falkirk, Queen's Park and Dumbarton.

== Career ==
On 10 January 2015, MacLean made his debut for Motherwell as a substitute in a 4–1 defeat against Dundee.

On 7 December 2016, MacLean signed a new two-and-a-half-year deal with Motherwell. He scored his first career goal on 9 August 2017, scoring the winner in extra-time as Motherwell won 3–2 away to Ross County in the Scottish League Cup.

MacLean was loaned to Greenock Morton in June 2018 for the 2018–19 season; scoring for the club on his league debut against Queen of the South.

MacLean signed for Falkirk in January 2019. He left Falkirk in January 2020 and signed for Queen's Park. After winning the 2020–21 Scottish League Two title with the Spiders, MacLean signed a two-year deal with Dumbarton in June 2021 scoring on his debut in a 2–1 defeat to Stenhousemuir. He finished the season as the club's top scorer, with nine goals, as the Sons were relegated to Scottish League Two. He signed a new two-year deal with the club in April 2023. In January 2024 he announced he would be taking a leave of absence from the Sons after a change in his working circumstances. He officially left the club in June 2024, joining Forfar Athletic for an undisclosed fee.

== Career statistics ==
As of 21:06, 23 December 2023 (UTC)

Appearances and goals by club, season and competition
Club	Season	League			National Cup		League Cup		Other		Total	
Club	Season	Division	Apps	Goals	Apps	Goals	Apps	Goals	Apps	Goals	Apps	Goals
Motherwell	2014–15	Scottish Premiership	1	0	0	0	0	0	0	0	1	0
Motherwell	2015–16	Scottish Premiership	0	0	0	0	0	0	0	0	0	0
Motherwell	2016–17	Scottish Premiership	7	0	0	0	1	0	2 (Note: Appearances for Motherwell under-20s in the Scottish Challenge Cup in which age-restricted sides from the Scottish Premiership clubs compete against senior clubs)	0	10	0
Motherwell	2017–18	Scottish Premiership	8	0	1	0	2	1	0	0	11	1
Motherwell	2018–19	Scottish Premiership	0	0	0	0	0	0	0	0	0	0
Motherwell	Total		16	0	1	0	3	1	2	0	22	1
Greenock Morton (loan)	2018–19	Scottish Championship	16	1	0	0	4	1	1 (Note: Appearances in the Scottish Challenge Cup)	0	21	2
Falkirk	2018–19	Scottish Championship	15	0	0	0	0	0	0	0	15	0
Falkirk	2019–20	Scottish League One	7	0	1	0	2	0	1	0	11	0
Falkirk	Total		22	0	1	0	2	0	1	0	26	0
Queen's Park	2019–20	Scottish League Two	7	1	0	0	0	0	0	0	7	1
Queen's Park	2020–21	Scottish League Two	22	2	1	0	3	0	0	0	26	2
Queen's Park	Total		29	3	1	0	3	0	0	0	33	3
Dumbarton	2021–22	Scottish League One	28	6	1	0	3	2	3	1	35	9
Dumbarton	2022–23	Scottish League Two	25	3	3	1	3	1	0	0	31	5
Dumbarton	2023–24	Scottish League Two	15	3	2	0	4	0	2	0	23	3
Dumbarton	Total		68	12	6	1	10	3	5	1	89	17
Career total			151	16	9	1	21	5	9	1	193	23
