= Eoghan Stokes =

Irish footballer (born 1996)

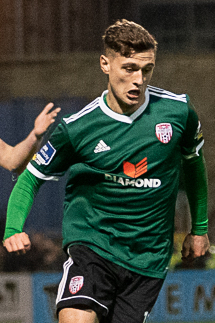
- Stokes with Derry City in 2019

Personal information
- Full name: Eoghan Stokes
- Date of birth: 17 May 1996 (age 30)
- Place of birth: Leixlip, Ireland
- Position: Attacking midfielder

Team information
- Current team: Manningham United

Youth career
- –2007: Leixlip United
- 2007–2012: St Kevin's Boys
- 2012–2014: Leeds United

Senior career*
Years	Team	Apps	(Gls)
2014–2018	Leeds United	0	(0)
2018	Bohemians	31	(5)
2019	Derry City	20	(3)
2019	Cork City	11	(0)
2020–2021	Airdrieonians	8	(0)
2021–2022	Dumbarton	24	(4)
2023	Christchurch United	25	(18)
2024	Port Melbourne	22	(6)
2025	Heidelberg United	3	(0)
2026–	Manningham United	0	(0)

International career
2011–2012	Republic of Ireland U16	2	(1)
2012–2013	Republic of Ireland U17	8	(0)
2014–2015	Republic of Ireland U19	9	(4)
- * Club domestic league appearances and goals as of 22:37, 18 March 2026 (UTC)

Eoghan Stokes (born 17 May 1996) is an Irish professional footballer who plays as an attacking midfielder for Victorian Premier League club Manningham United in Australia. He has previously played for Leeds United, Bohemians, Derry City, Cork City, Airdrieonians, Dumbarton, Christchurch United, Heidelberg United and is also a former Republic of Ireland U19 international. He can also play as a forward.

== Career ==
=== Leeds United ===
After being spotted playing for St Kevin's Boys in Ireland, Stokes was signed by Leeds United in 2012, where he graduated through their academy. He was given his Leeds United first team debut on 22 August 2017, starting for Leeds in a 5–1 League Cup victory against Newport County.

On 1 February 2018, Leeds announced they had terminated the contract of Stokes by mutual consent. On 2 February 2018, Leeds Head Coach Thomas Christiansen revealed that he felt Stokes would be set to join a League One or League Two level club after his release.

=== Bohemians ===
Stokes joined League of Ireland Premier Division side Bohemians on 15 February 2018. He appeared the next day against Shamrock Rovers as Bohs won 3–1 on the opening night of the 2018 season, but was on the bench. On 24 February 2018, Stokes scored his first goal for Bohemians in a 1–1 draw against Limerick. Over the season, Stokes played 39 games in all competitions for Bohs, scoring 8 goals including one away to Shamrock Rovers in the Dublin Derby.

During the off season, he spent time on trial with Boavista of the Primeira Liga, Portugal's top flight. Stokes decided not to proceed with Boavista, and returned to Ireland.

=== Derry City ===
Stokes signed for Derry City on 5 February 2019 alongside Argentinian midfielder Gerardo Bruna. He scored on his debut 10 days later in a 3–0 win over newly promoted UCD on the opening night of the season. After 4 goals in 21 appearances in all competitions, Stokes departed Derry City on deadline day of the summer transfer window.

=== Cork City ===
Stokes signed for Cork City on 31 July 2019, given the number 7 shirt. He made his debut on 2 August 2019 against St Patrick's Athletic. It was announced on 7 November that Stokes had been released by Cork after failing to score in his 13 appearances for the club.

=== Airdrieonians ===
On 20 August 2020, Stokes signed for Scottish League One side Airdrieonians. Upon signing for the club, Stokes looked to clarify to the club's supporters that his position has mainly been in an attacking midfield role and not a striker as widely reported. He made his debut for the club on 7 October 2020 in a 2–0 Scottish League Cup loss to Alloa Athletic and remained at the club until May 2021, having made 13 appearances for the club.

=== Dumbarton ===
After leaving Airdrieonians, Stokes joined Scottish League One side Dumbarton in June 2021. He scored his first goal for the club on 11 August 2021 in a 3–2 defeat at home to Rangers B in the Scottish Challenge Cup, his first goal since 2019. Stokes scored five goals in nine starts and 20 substitute appearances for the Sons, before being released by the club in May 2022 following their relegation to Scottish League Two.

=== Christchurch United ===
In January 2023, Stokes moved to New Zealand, joining Southern League side Christchurch United, where he would also take on the role of Assistant Academy coach for the clubs underage teams. He scored 15 goals in 16 appearances as the club won the 2023 Southern League. On 10 September 2023 he was part of the team that won the 2023 Chatham Cup, defeating Melville United on penalties, with Stokes scoring his penalty in the shootout.

== International career ==
Stokes has represented Ireland at various levels including up to Republic of Ireland U19's level.

== Career statistics ==
As of match played on 23 February 2025

Appearances and goals by club, season and competition
Club	Season	League			National Cup		League Cup		Other		Total	
Club	Season	Division	Apps	Goals	Apps	Goals	Apps	Goals	Apps	Goals	Apps	Goals
Leeds United	2017–18	EFL Championship	0	0	0	0	1	0	–		1	0
Bohemians	2018	LOI Premier Division	31	5	4	2	2	1	2 (Note: Appearances in Scottish Challenge Cup)	0	39	8
Derry City	2019	LOI Premier Division	20	3	–		1	1	–		21	4
Cork City	2019	LOI Premier Division	11	0	2	0	–		–		13	0
Airdrieonians	2020–21	Scottish League One	8	0	1	0	4	0	–		13	0
Dumbarton	2021–22	Scottish League One	24	4	1	0	3	0	1	1	29	5
Christchurch United	2023	National League	25	18	6	3	–		–		31	21
Port Melbourne	2024	NPL Victoria	22	6	0	0	–		–		22	6
Heidelberg United	2025	NPL Victoria	3	0	0	0	–		–		3	0
Manningham United	2026	Victorian Premier League	0	0	0	0	–		–		0	0
Career Total			144	36	14	5	11	2	3	1	172	44

== Honours ==
Christchurch United

- Southern League: 2023
- Chatham Cup: 2023
