= Gregor Buchanan =

Scottish footballer (born 1990)

Personal information
- Date of birth: 31 March 1990 (age 36)
- Place of birth: Falkirk, Scotland
- Height: 6 ft 3 in (1.91 m)
- Position: Defender

Team information
- Current team: Stenhousemuir
- Number: 4

Youth career
- Falkirk

Senior career*
Years	Team	Apps	(Gls)
2008–2010	Armadale Thistle		
2010–2012	Bathgate Thistle		
2012–2014	Airdrieonians	60	(7)
2014–2015	Dunfermline Athletic	30	(2)
2015–2017	Dumbarton	63	(2)
2017–2018	St Mirren	10	(1)
2018	Livingston	8	(0)
2018–2019	Greenock Morton	35	(2)
2019–2020	Falkirk	25	(0)
2020–2021	Queen of the South	25	(1)
2021–2023	Dumbarton	65	(7)
2023–	Stenhousemuir	106	(12)
- * Club domestic league appearances and goals as of 4 May 2026

Gregor Buchanan (born 31 March 1990) is a Scottish footballer who plays as a defender for Scottish Championship club Stenhousemuir where he is the club's captain.

After progressing through Falkirk's youth academy, Buchanan played for Scottish Junior clubs Armadale Thistle and Bathgate Thistle. Buchanan later played for Airdrieonians, Dunfermline Athletic, Dumbarton (first spell), St Mirren, Livingston, Greenock Morton, Falkirk, Queen of the South and Dumbarton.

== Early and personal life ==
Buchanan is originally from Falkirk in Stirlingshire.

== Career ==
Buchanan was released by Falkirk at the age of sixteen. Buchanan then played with Scottish Junior clubs Armadale Thistle and Bathgate Thistle, before signing for Scottish First Division club Airdrie United in July 2012. In his first season with The Diamonds, Buchanan was part of the team that finished bottom of the final Scottish First Division. In the 2013–14 season, Buchanan helped the club to a mid-table finish and after some impressive performances was signed by fellow Scottish League One club Dunfermline Athletic.

A few weeks after leaving the Pars, Buchanan signed for Dumbarton and was Stephen Aitken's first signing for the club in May 2015. Buchanan renewed his contract at the end of the 2015-16 season.

Buchanan departed the Sons after 77 appearances, scoring three goals and then signed for Scottish Championship rivals St Mirren on a one-year deal in May 2017. Prior to turning professional with St Mirren, as a part-time player, Buchanan worked as an insurance salesman. After limited chances to play for the Buddies, Buchanan departed the club by mutual consent on 11 January 2018 and signed for Livingston. Both of the clubs Buchanan represented in the 2017-18 season, the Buddies and the Lions, were promoted from the Scottish Championship. Buchanan was awarded a Championship winner's medal for his time at the Buddies.

Buchanan signed a one-year deal with Greenock Morton in June 2018. In June 2019, Buchanan signed for home-town club Falkirk. Buchanan departed the Bairns at the end of the 2019-20 season, after being appointed club captain that season.

On 24 August 2020, Buchanan signed for Queen of the South until 31 May 2021.

On 12 February 2021, Buchanan captained Queens in his 300th club career match versus Hearts as the match ended in a 1-1 draw at Palmerston Park.

On 12 June 2021, after leaving the Doonhamers, Buchanan returned to Dumbarton, signing a two-year deal. He was named the club's vice-captain in June 2022. He left the club in May 2023 after turning down the offer of a new deal.

== Career statistics ==
As of 20:07, 13 May 2023 (UTC)

Appearances and goals by club, season and competition
Club	Season	League			Scottish Cup		League Cup		Other		Total	
Club	Season	Division	Apps	Goals	Apps	Goals	Apps	Goals	Apps	Goals	Apps	Goals
Airdrie United/Airdrieonians (Note: Airdrie United changed name to Airdrieonians in June 2013)	2012–13	Scottish Division One	28	2	2	1	0	0	1 (Note: Appearances in the Scottish Challenge Cup)	0	31	3
Airdrie United/Airdrieonians	2013–14	Scottish League One	32	5	1	0	1	0	1	0	35	5
Airdrie United/Airdrieonians	Total		60	7	3	1	1	0	2	0	66	8
Dunfermline Athletic	2014–15	Scottish League One	30	1	3	1	2	1	1	0	36	3
Dumbarton	2015–16	Scottish Championship	30	1	4	0	1	0	2	0	37	1
Dumbarton	2016–17	Scottish Championship	33	1	2	0	4	1	1	0	40	2
Dumbarton	Total		63	2	6	0	5	1	3	0	77	3
St Mirren	2017–18	Scottish Championship	10	1	0	0	3	1	3	0	16	2
Livingston	2017–18	Scottish Championship	8	0	1	0	0	0	2 (Note: Appearances in the Scottish Premiership play-offs)	0	11	0
Greenock Morton	2018–19	Scottish Championship	35	2	3	0	3	0	0	0	41	2
Falkirk	2019–20	Scottish League One	25	0	4	0	4	0	2	0	35	0
Queen of the South	2020–21	Scottish Championship	25	1	2	0	4	0	0	0	31	1
Dumbarton	2021–22	Scottish League One	32	3	2	0	3	0	3	1	40	4
Dumbarton	2022–23	Scottish League Two	33	4	3	1	4	1	3	0	43	6
Dumbarton	Total		65	7	5	1	7	1	6	1	83	10
Dumbarton	Dumbarton total		128	9	11	1	12	2	9	1	160	13
Stenhousemuir	2023–24	Scottish League Two	13	4	1	0	2	0	1	0	17	4
Career total			334	25	28	3	31	4	20	1	412	33

== Honours ==
St Mirren SPFL Championship 2017–18
