= Sam Ramsbottom =

English footballer (born 1996)

Personal information
- Date of birth: 3 April 1996 (age 30)
- Place of birth: Greasby, England
- Height: 6 ft 5 in (1.96 m)
- Position: Goalkeeper

Team information
- Current team: Cape Town Spurs

Youth career
- 2003–2013: Tranmere Rovers

Senior career*
Years	Team	Apps	(Gls)
2013–2016	Tranmere Rovers	0	(0)
- → Burscough (loan)
- → Droylsden (loan)
- → Bootle (loan)
- → Witton Albion (loan)
2016–2017	Galway United	5	(0)
2017	Barrow	0	(0)
2017–2018	Macclesfield Town	6	(0)
2018–2019	Alfreton Town	40	(0)
2019–2020	Greenock Morton	8	(0)
2021–2022	Dumbarton	34	(0)
2022–2023	Edinburgh	1	(0)
2023–	Cape Town Spurs	8	(0)
- * Club domestic league appearances and goals as of 08:45, 25 May 2024 (UTC)

Sam Ramsbottom (born 3 April 1996) is an English professional footballer who plays as a goalkeeper for Cape Town Spurs.

Ramsbottom has played for Tranmere Rovers, Burscough, Droylsden, Bootle, Witton Albion, Galway United, Barrow, Macclesfield Town, Alfreton Town, Greenock Morton and Dumbarton.

== Career ==
Born in Greasby, Ramsbottom began his career with Tranmere Rovers, joining them at the age of 7 and spending time on loan with Burscough, Droylsden, Bootle and Witton Albion before signing for Irish club Galway United in July 2016. After a short spell with Barrow he signed for Macclesfield Town in September 2017. He then spent time with Alfreton Town before signing a one-year contract with Scottish club Greenock Morton in June 2019. He left Morton at the end of the 2019–20 season, and went on trial with Falkirk in September 2020. After his spell on trial with Falkirk ended and offers overseas were stopped by the COVID-19 pandemic, Ramsbottom joined Dumbarton in March 2021. After establishing himself as the club's number one, Ramsbottom extended his contract with the club in June 2021. He left the Sons in May 2022 following their relegation to Scottish League Two.

In August 2023, Ramsbottom joined South African Premier Division club Cape Town Spurs.
