= Greig McDonald =

Scottish footballer, manager and assistant manager

Personal information
- Date of birth: 12 May 1982 (age 44)
- Place of birth: Dunfermline, Scotland
- Positions: Right back; defender

Youth career
- –2002: Dunfermline Athletic

Senior career*
Years	Team	Apps	(Gls)
2002–2003	Brechin City	2	(0)
2003–2009	East Fife	159	(33)
2010–2014	Stirling Albion	11	(0)
2015–2016	Annan Athletic	9	(2)
Total		181	(35)

Managerial career
- 2011–2014: Stirling Albion
- 2022–2024: East Fife
- * Club domestic league appearances and goals

Greig McDonald (born 12 May 1982 in Dunfermline) is a Scottish football player and manager.

== Playing career ==
McDonald was part of the East Fife team that won the 2007–08 Scottish Third Division.

On 14 August 2015 McDonald sign for Annan Athletic

== Coaching career ==
McDonald was appointed caretaker manager of Stirling Albion after Jocky Scott left the club in December 2011. He became the youngest manager of a senior league club in the UK when he was appointed Stirling Albion manager on a permanent basis on 22 January 2012. McDonald missed a league victory against Rangers in October 2012 as he was getting married on the same day. He led the Binos to promotion to Scottish League One via the play-offs the following season by beating his former club East Fife in the final of that playoffs that year, but left the club in October 2014 with them sitting bottom of League One.

On 8 December 2021, McDonald joined East Fife as assistant manager. McDonald became their manager on 25 October 2022, but he resigned in February 2024 and was replaced by Dick Campbell.

== Managerial statistics ==
As of 3 February 2024

Team	Nat	From	To	Record				
Team	Nat	From	To	G	W	D	L	Win %
Stirling Albion	(Scotland)	December 2011	October 2014	121	42	28	51	34.71
East Fife	(Scotland)	25 September 2022	6 February 2024	69	21	19	29	30.43
Total				190	63	47	80	33.16

- Initially caretaker at Stirling Albion and appointed permanently on 22 January 2012
- Initially caretaker at East Fife and appointed permanently on 25 October 2022

== Honours ==
East Fife

- Scottish League Two champion (1): 2007–08 (Footballer)

Stirling Albion

- Scottish League One play-offs (1): 2013–14 (Player/Manager)
