= George Stanger =

Scottish-born New Zealand footballer

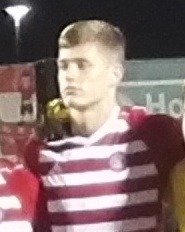
- Stanger in 2018

Personal information
- Full name: George William Stanger
- Date of birth: 15 August 2000 (age 26)
- Place of birth: Melrose, Scotland
- Height: 6 ft 3 in (1.91 m)
- Position: Defender

Team information
- Current team: Kilmarnock
- Number: 14

Youth career
- –2018: Stirling Albion

Senior career*
Years	Team	Apps	(Gls)
2018–2021	Hamilton Academical	8	(0)
2018	→ Stirling Albion (loan)	11	(0)
2019	→ East Kilbride (loan)	0	(0)
2020	→ Forfar Athletic (loan)	4	(0)
2021–2022	University of Stirling		
2022	→ Dumbarton (loan)	10	(1)
2022–2023	Alloa Athletic	33	(3)
2023–2025	Ayr United	62	(4)
2025–	Kilmarnock	34	(3)

International career^{‡}
2019	New Zealand U20	4	(0)
2019–	New Zealand U23	2	(0)
2026–	New Zealand	1	(0)
- * Club domestic league appearances and goals as of 08:45, 22 November 2026 (UTC) ‡ National team caps and goals as of 21:57, 24 September 2026 (UTC)

George William Stanger (born 15 August 2000) is a professional footballer who plays as a defender for Scottish Premiership club Kilmarnock. Born in Scotland, Stanger represents the New Zealand national team.

== Early and personal life ==
Stanger's father is former Scottish International rugby union player Tony Stanger, and his mother Bid is from Auckland, New Zealand. George was born in Melrose in the Scottish Borders; the family eventually settled in Dunblane.

== Club career ==
Stanger began his career with Stirling Albion, joining Hamilton Academical in January 2018 before being loaned back to Stirling Albion for the rest of the season, making his senior debut in Scottish League Two. During the 2018–19 campaign he played for Hamilton's youth teams, including in the Scottish Challenge Cup and the UEFA Youth League.

In the summer 2019 transfer window, he was linked with a move away from Hamilton. He made his first professional-level start for the club in the Scottish Premiership on 24 August, a 3–1 home defeat to Motherwell in the Lanarkshire derby.

In September 2019 he moved on loan to East Kilbride. In January 2020 he moved on loan to Forfar Athletic.

He was released by Hamilton in October 2021 and joined University of Stirling in the Lowland Football League, before signing for Scottish League One side Dumbarton on loan in February 2022. He scored his first goal in senior football for the Sons in a 3–2 defeat to Airdrieonians in April 2022 but turned down a new deal following the club's relegation to Scottish League Two.

Stanger signed for Alloa Athletic in July 2022. After one season with Alloa, Stanger moved to Ayr United in June 2023.

In June 2025, following the expiry of his contract with Ayr, Stanger signed for Kilmarnock.

In August 2026, English club Burton Albion made a transfer bid for Stanger.

== International career ==
Stanger represented New Zealand at the 2019 FIFA U-20 World Cup. In June 2021 he was called up to New Zealand's squad for the delayed 2020 Summer Olympics.

On 24 September 2026, Stanger made his debut for the New Zealand senior team in a friendly match against Palestine, which ended 2–2.
