= Stephen Farrell (footballer) =

Scottish footballer and manager

Personal information
- Full name: Stephen Edward Farrell
- Date of birth: 8 March 1973 (age 53)
- Place of birth: Kilwinning, Scotland
- Positions: Defender; midfielder

Youth career
- –1990: Kilmarnock

Senior career*
Years	Team	Apps	(Gls)
1990–1992	Stoke City	2	(0)
1992–1994	St Mirren	27	(2)
1994–1995	Stranraer	4	(1)
1995–1997	Glenafton Athletic		
1997–1998	Stenhousemuir	31	(1)
1998–2005	Kilwinning Rangers		
2005–2008	Cumnock Juniors		
2008	Irvine Meadow		
2008–2011	Cumnock Juniors		

Managerial career
- 2009–2012: Cumnock Juniors
- 2017–2021: Stranraer
- 2021–2025: Dumbarton
- 2026–: Johnstone Burgh
- * Club domestic league appearances and goals

Stephen Edward Farrell (born 8 March 1973) is a Scottish former professional footballer.

== Playing career ==
Farrell began his professional career with Kilmarnock before joining Stoke City in January 1990. He made just two appearances for Stoke both coming as a substitute towards the end of the 1989–90 season. After Stoke suffered relegation Farrell returned to Scotland and had spells at St Mirren and Stranraer then dropped to Junior level with Glenafton Athletic. Farrell stepped back up to the Scottish Football League for one season with Stenhousemuir before heading back to Junior football in 1998.

== Coaching career ==
He was appointed manager of Cumnock Juniors in March 2009, as successor to Campbell Money. In December 2012, Farrell was appointed assistant manager of Stranraer. He moved with Aitken to Dumbarton in May 2015.

Farrell returned to Stranraer in January 2017, taking up the position of manager after Brian Reid left the club by mutual consent.

In May 2021, Farrell returned to Dumbarton as manager on a two-year deal and was named League One manager of the month for September 2021. At the end of Farrell's first season in charge, the Sons were relegated via the playoffs to Scottish League Two. The following season the Sons won their first seven league games, with Farrell named League Two manager of the month for August 2022. He also won the award for November and December 2022, before signing a new contract with the Sons in January 2023. In Farrell's third season in charge they won promotion back to Scottish League One - defeating The Spartans 4-3 across two legs. The club were relegated the following season, with Farrell remaining in charge under new owner Mario Lapointe.

Farrell left Dumbarton on November 30, 2025 after 210 games in charge. His final match was a 4-0 home defeat to Auchinleck Talbot in the Scottish Cup. At the time of his departure he was the club's second longest serving manager post-war.

== Personal life ==
Outside football, Farrell is joint deputy General Secretary of the Prison Service Union.

== Career statistics ==
=== Player ===
Club	Season	League			FA Cup		League Cup		Total	
Club	Season	Division	Apps	Goals	Apps	Goals	Apps	Goals	Apps	Goals
Stoke City	1989–90	Second Division	2	0	0	0	0	0	2	0
Career Total			2	0	0	0	0	0	2	0

=== Managerial record ===
As of match played 29 November 2025

Managerial record by team and tenure
Team	From	To	Record				
Team	From	To	P	W	D	L	Win %
Stranraer	20 January 2017	29 May 2021	166	53	41	72	31.9
Dumbarton	29 May 2021	30 November 2025	210	74	48	88	35.2
Total			376	127	89	160	33.78

- Dumbarton statistics include League Cup forfeit defeat against St Mirren on 9 July 2021 (Co-vid Pandemic).

== Honours ==
Dumbarton

- Scottish League One play-offs: 2023-24
