= 2025–26 Dumbarton F.C. season =

Dumbarton
2025–26 season
- Chairman: Dr Neil Mackay (until July 23) John Steele
- Manager: Stevie Farrell (until November 30) Frank McKeown (from December 5)
- Stadium: The Rock - Sponsored by Marbill Coaches
- League Two: 9th
- League Cup: Group stage
- Top goalscorer: League: Leighton McIntosh (16); All: Leighton McIntosh (16)
- Highest home attendance: 1,054 (v Auchinleck Talbot, 29 November 2025)
- Lowest home attendance: 253 (v Stenhousemuir, 19 November 2025)
- Average home league attendance: 701

The 2025–26 season was Dumbarton Football Club's first back in Scottish League Two, the fourth tier of Scottish football, having finished 10th in Scottish League One in 2024–25. Dumbarton will also compete in the Scottish League Cup and the Scottish Cup.

== Story of the season ==
=== May ===
Preparations for the new season following relegation back to Scottish League Two started with David Wilson, Joel Mumbongo and Greig Young being released. On May 21 Canadian businessman Mario Lapointe was announced as the administrator's new preferred bidder, and it was hoped that a takeover deal could be concluded by early June. On the park, forward James Hilton left after two seasons - turning down a new deal to join League Two rivals Clyde.

=== June ===
Midfielder Finlay Gray was the next player to leave, turning down a new deal to join Stenhousemuir after three seasons with the club. The same week friendlies were confirmed with St Mirren and West of Scotland Football League side Irvine Meadow. Carlo Pignatiello and Michael Ruth both left the club on June 12 to join Queen's Park. At the same time it was announced that the club would be exiting administration following the formation of a Newco. The club's first matches of the new season came in the Stirlingshire Cup - with a squad entirely made up of trialists losing 2-0 in 60 minute matches against Stenhousemuir and Stirling Albion. On June 24 the club's takeover by Lapointe was officially confirmed.

This was followed by a busy period of activity as the club's squad began to take shape. Skipper Mark Durnan was the first to agree a new deal, and was joined in staying by Cameron Clark, Ryan Blair,Tony Wallace and Aron Lynas. New signings arrived in the shape of defender Morgyn Neill, returning for a second spell at the club, former East Fife defender Gordon Walker and goalkeeper Shay Kelly - who returned after a successful loan spell.

The following day was busy too, with Chris Johnston, Ally Roy and Dominic Docherty all joining the club on permanent deals. On June 27, a quadruple loan signing saw Carrick McAvoy, Thomas Falconer and Theo McCormick join from St Mirren, and Ollie Ecrepont sign from Ayr United. The same day, former East Kilbride defender Adam Livingstone also joined the club. However Michael Miller and Patrick O'Neil were joined by youngster Zak Queen in leaving the club on the same day. The first home friendly of the Mario Lapointe era ended in a 4-0 defeat to Scottish Premiership St Mirren.

=== July ===
The first friendly of July ended in a 4-3 defeat to Irvine Meadow XI - Ally Roy and two trialists, Scott Honeyman and Kemo Darboe, got Dumbarton's goals. On July 4 Kalvin Orsi turned down a new deal and left the club for Alloa Athletic. The same day winger Scott Tomlinson joined on loan for the season from Ayr United. The club's final pre-season friendly on July 6 ended in a 3-3 draw with Queen of the South - with Tony Wallace, Ryan Blair and Ally Roy on target. On July 9, Scott Honeyman became the club's 13th new addition of the summer - joining from Falkirk after impressing during a spell on trial. He was followed by striker Leighton McIntosh who joined from Jordanian side Al Ahli SC. The Scottish League Cup group stage got underway with a 1-0 victory against Stirling Albion with Kyle Banner's own goal separating the sides. Midfielder Kai Kirkpatrick joined on loan from Kelty Hearts in the lead up to the match, and made his debut as a substitute. A 4-0 defeat to Dunfermline Athletic followed. On July 23, John Steele was appointed as the club's new chairman - replacing Dr Neil Mackay in the role. On the park, the Sons lost 4-0 to Heart of Midlothian, before finishing their group stage campaign with a 1-0 win against Scottish League One Hamilton Academical - Ally Roy got the winner.

=== August ===
The league season got underway on August 2, with Sons winning 2-1 against Clyde at the Dumbarton Football Stadium. Liam Scullion netted an own goal with Ryan Blair scoring the second, directly from a corner. On August 5, defender Kristian Webster returned to the club on a permanent deal until January after impressing on loan the season previous. The first away league match of the season brought a third straight victory, with an own goal and Kai Kirkpatrick scoring his first for the Sons in a 2-1 win against The Spartans. The good form continued with a 4-2 success against St Mirren B in the Scottish Challenge Cup. Scott Tomlinson, Chris Johnston and Dom Docherty got their first Dumbarton goals, with Tony Wallace also on target. A 1-1 draw with Elgin City maintained the unbeaten start - with Scott Honeyman netting his first goal for the club. A week later Sons won 4-3 against Annan Athletic - in a game where they went 4-0 up after 60 minutes. Leighton McIntosh netted a double, his first goals for the club, with Ally Roy also scoring twice. Three days later another win followed, 1-0 against Hearts B in the Challenge Cup - with Scott Honeyman scoring the winner. The month ended with a first league defeat of the season, 2-1 at home to Edinburgh City. Mark Durnan got Sons' goal.

=== September ===
The first match of September saw Sons return to Challenge Cup duties, with Scott Honeyman netting an injury time leveller against League 1 East Fife. A 3-2 comeback victory against Forfar Athletic followed on September 13, with Sons fighting back from two goals down to win a game for the first time since 2019. Honeyman was again on target with Leighton McIntosh scoring a brace. On September 20, Sons drew 1-1 in their first ever league meeting with reigning Lowland Football League champions East Kilbride. Scott Tomlinson got the goal. Back on Scottish Challenge Cup duties, Dumbarton fought back from 3-1 down to draw 3-3 with Kelty Hearts - Scott Honeyman and Tony Wallace found the net, with Kelty's Aaron Arnott scoring an own goal. A 2-1 home defeat to Stranraer closed off the month, with James Dolan netting a stoppage time winner for the away side.

=== October ===
October opened with Panos Grivas, Owen Doyle and Brett Long all leaving the club on loan deals. The first game of the month ended in a 2-2 draw with Stirling Albion at Forthbank Stadium. Scott Honeyman and Gordon Walker were on target for the Sons, with Walker's goal his first in Scottish football. A 1-0 win against Rangers B was next, with Kristian Webster getting the winner - ensuring the club would make the second round of the Scottish Challenge Cup. A third consecutive home league loss however followed, with The Spartans winning 2-1 at The Rock. Leighton McIntosh got Sons' goal, his first at home for the club. Sons returned to winning ways with a 2-0 victory against Tayport in the second round of the Scottish Cup. Morgyn Neill opened the scoring with Gordon Walker netting a second for his second goal of the month. Dumbarton were drawn to face West of Scotland Football League Auchinleck Talbot in the third round.

=== November ===
The winless league run extended to five matches however with defeat against Clyde at New Douglas Park on November 1. Leighton McIntosh got Sons' goal, his sixth in 11 league matches - and the 100th of his career. A first home league victory since the opening day of the season followed against Annan Athletic with Tony Wallace netting the winner. That was followed by back-to-back 2-0 defeats to Elgin City at Borough Briggs on November 15 and Stenhousemuir on November 19. A third straight defeat followed, 4-1 at home to Forfar Athletic. November ended with a 4-0 defeat against West of Scotland Football League side Auchinleck Talbot. The following day manager Stephen Farrell was sacked after 210 games in charge. In the same game, U20s coach Daryl Smith was named as the club's substitute goalkeeper with Ollie Ecrepont suspended and Luke Smallwood injured.

=== December ===
On December 5 Frank McKeown was appointed as the club's next manager, assisted by Stephen Simmons and Mark Docherty. His first match in charge ended in a 4-3 defeat to Edinburgh City - Leighton McIntosh netted a double to take him to 10 goals for the season, with Aedan Gilfedder handed his first start for the first team and Camryn Donald making his debut as a late substitute. On December 12, midfielder Thomas Falconer returned to parent club St Mirren. A run of five straight defeats was ended by a 2-0 win against league leaders East Kilbride on December 13, in McKeown's first home match in charge. Dom Docherty and Mark Durnan got the goals. The Sons were brought back down to earth four days later with a 9-0 home defeat against Inverness Caledonian Thistle in the Scottish Challenge Cup - a record defeat at home. Back on league business, Kai Kirkpatrick netted a stoppage time leveller in a 1-1 draw away against Stranraer on December 20. December ended with a 2-1 home defeat to Stirling Albion that left Sons ninth in the League Two table at the turn of the year.

=== January ===
Another defeat opened January, with Sons losing 2-0 to league leader The Spartans with goalkeeper Brett Long making his first appearance after a year out with injury. On January 8 midfielder Carrick McEvoy had his loan deal terminated and returned to parent club St Mirren. The club's first home match of the New Year, against Clyde, fell victim to the weather. On January 10, defender Cameron Clark left the club by mutual consent after 18 months and 46 appearances. The following day Josh Todd became Frank McKeown's first signing as Sons boss - joining on an 18 month deal from Annan Athletic. Defender Kristian Webster also committed his future to the Sons for the remainder of the season. On January 22 goalkeeper Ollie Ecrepont returned to parent club Ayr United at the end of his loan deal. A busy January 24 saw defender Ali Omar, midfielder Tobi Joseph and forward Aaron Brown all join the club. On the park, the Sons drew 2-2 with Elgin City - with Josh Todd and Leighton McIntosh both on target. A day later forward Theo McCormick's loan deal was ended and he returned to St Mirren with winger Chris Johnston leaving the club three days later on January 28. On January 29 midfielder Kai Kirkpatrick made his loan deal permanent, signing an 18 month deal. The club ended January winless, with Edinburgh City 2-1 winners on January 31 - meaning the gap at the foot of the table dropped to just two points. Leighton McIntosh again got Sons' goal.

=== February ===
On deadline day, defender Michael Doyle joined from League One side Cove Rangers. A day later long-serving defender Aron Lynas left the club. On February 7 midfielder Dom Docherty left for county neighbours Clydebank, whilst striker Jack Duncan joined the club from Edinburgh City. On the park, the poor form continued - with a 2-0 defeat to Forfar Athletic leaving the Sons with just one win in their last 13 games, and without an away win since September. A 1-0 loss to Annan Athletic on February 10 left Frank McKeown with just one win from his first 10 games in charge. Two days later defender Morgyn Neill joined Elgin City on loan for the remainder of the season - having not started a match since the 9-0 defeat to Inverness Caledonian Thistle in mid-December. The club's match with Stranraer on February 14 was then called off due to a frozen pitch. A fourth straight defeat came on February 21, 3-1 against East Kilbride, with Ali Omar scoring Sons' goal. A 0-0 draw with Clyde three days later secured just a second point of the new year - and only a second clean sheet in the league of the season. On February 28 goalkeeper Aidan Rice and attacking midfielder Alexander Smith joined the club on loan from Celtic and Rangers respectively. Smith made his debut the following day, setting up Mark Durnan's injury time equaliser in a 1-1 draw with Stirling Albion.

=== March ===
A first win of 2026 arrived in style on March 7, with Sons 3-0 winners against second place Spartans. Gordon Walker, Leighton McIntosh and Scott Honeyman got the goals, with Celtic loanee Aidan Rice making his first start for the club in goals. Another victory followed, this time 2-0 at home to Stranraer. Mark Durnan and Scott Honeyman got the goals. Leighton McIntosh's goal maintained the unbeaten start to March in a 1-1 draw with Elgin City. McIntosh netted the winner a week later in a 2-1 success against Annan Athletic - with Scott Honeyman also on target. His goal was his 10th of the campaign. Also in March Defender Ali Omar was called up to the Somalia national football team meaning that he would miss the following game against Forfar Athletic - becoming the first Sons player since Dimitris Froxylias in 2018 to receive a full international call-up. Attacker Alexander Smith also earned a call-up to the Scotland national under-19 football team meaning that he would also be unavailable for the Forfar match. That game finished 2-2, with Sons coming from 2-0 down to extend the gap over Edinburgh City to 10 points - thanks to goals from Leighton McIntosh and Scott Honeyman.

=== April ===
A 12th goal of the season for Honeyman secured a 1-1 draw with Stranraer in April's opening game. Extending the gap over Edinburgh City to 11 points with four matches remaining. Sons secured their place in the SPFL the following weekend, with Honeyman netting the winner in a 2-1 victory against Stirling Albion. Scott Tomlinson had opened the scoring, with Kai Kirkpatrick sent-off in stoppage time for violent conduct. The following week forward Leighton McIntosh was named in the PFA Scotland League Two Team of the Year. After nine matches, the club suffered their first defeat since February with a 2-0 loss to Clyde on April 18. On April 22, boss Frank McKeown and his management team signed an extended two-year deal to remain with the club until the summer of 2028. The month ended with a 1-0 defeat to East Kilbride in the final home game of the season. That night Leighton McIntosh was named as the club's Player of the Year, with Scott Honeyman chosen as Young Player of the Year. The club's stadium was also officially renamed The Rock.

=== May ===
The season ended with a 5-0 defeat to Edinburgh City - in a game where Kai Kirkpatrick was sent-off for the second time in as many games.

== First team transfers ==
- From end of 2024–25 season, to last match of season 2025–26

=== In ===
Player	From	League	Fee
Morgyn Neill	Alloa Athletic	Scottish League One	Free
Gordon Walker	Free Agent		Free
Shay Kelly	St Mirren	Scottish Premiership	Free
Chris Johnston	Free Agent		Free
Dominic Docherty	Clyde	Scottish League Two	Free
Ally Roy	Stirling Albion	Scottish League Two	Free
Carrick McEvoy	St Mirren	Scottish Premiership	Loan
Thomas Falconer	St Mirren	Scottish Premiership	Loan
Theo McCormick	St Mirren	Scottish Premiership	Loan
Ollie Ecrepont	Ayr United	Scottish Championship	Loan
Adam Livingstone	East Kilbride	Scottish League Two	Free
Scott Tomlinson	Ayr United	Scottish Championship	Loan
Scott Honeyman	Falkirk	Scottish Premiership	Free
Leighton McIntosh	Al Ahli SC	Jordanian Pro League	Free
Kai Kirkpatrick	Kelty Hearts	Scottish League One	Loan
Kristian Webster	Rangers	Scottish Premiership	Free
Josh Todd	Annan Athletic	Scottish League Two	Free
Ali Omar	Farnborough	National League South	Free
Tobi Joseph	Worksop Town	National League North	Free
Aaron Brown	Ayr United	Scottish Championship	Free
Kai Kirkpatrick	Kelty Hearts	Scottish League One	Free
Michael Doyle	Cove Rangers	Scottish League One	Free
Jack Duncan	Edinburgh City	Scottish League Two	Free
Alexander Smith	Rangers	Scottish Premiership	Loan
Aidan Rice	Celtic	Scottish Premiership	Loan

=== Out ===
Player	To	League	Fee
David Wilson			Free
Joel Mumbongo	Annan Athletic	Scottish League Two	Free
Greig Young	Tranent	Lowland Football League	Free
Craig McGuffie	Peterhead	Scottish League One	Free
James Hilton	Clyde	Scottish League Two	Free
Finlay Gray	Stenhousemuir	Scottish League One	Free
Michael Ruth	Queen's Park	Scottish Championship	Free
Carlo Pignatiello	Queen's Park	Scottish Championship	Free
Matthew Shiels	Queen's Park	Scottish Championship	Free
Mouhamed Niang	East Kilbride	Scottish League Two	Free
Michael Miller			Free
Patrick O'Neil			Free
Zak Queen			Free
Kalvin Orsi	Alloa Athletic	Scottish League One	Free
Panos Grivas	Tynecastle	East of Scotland Football League	Loan
Owen Doyle	Drumchapel United	West of Scotland Football League	Loan
Brett Long	Beith Juniors	West of Scotland Football League	Loan
Cameron Clark	Annan Athletic	Scottish League Two	Free
Chris Johnston			Free
Aron Lynas	Forfar Athletic	Scottish League Two	Free
Dominic Docherty	Clydebank	Lowland Football League	Free
Morgyn Neill	Elgin City	Scottish League Two	Loan

== Fixtures and results ==
Win Draw Loss Upcoming fixture

=== Stirlingshire Cup ===
21 June 2025 Ground stage	Stenhousemuir	2 - 0	Dumbarton	Ochilview Park
10:00	Michael Anderson 42' 44'

21 June 2025 Group stage	Stirling Albion	2 - 0	Dumbarton	Ochilview Park
12:00	Dale Carrick 31' 49'

=== Friendlies ===
28 June 2025	Dumbarton	0 - 4	St Mirren	Dumbarton Football Stadium
15:00		Report	Mikael Mandron 37', Roland Idowu 52' 58', James Scott 85'	Attendance: 1,357

3 July 2025	Irvine Meadow	4 - 3	Dumbarton	Meadow Park
19:45	Jojo Gillespie 26' (pen.), Shaun Gallagher 49', Ross McKenzie 84', Euan Baird 88'	Report	Ally Roy 29', Kemo Darboe (T) 71', Scott Honeyman (T) 77'	Referee: Ross Clark

5 July 2025	Dumbarton	3 - 3	Queen of the South	Dumbarton Football Stadium
15:00	Tony Wallace 48' (pen.), Ryan Blair 62', Ally Roy 68'	Report	Kemo Darboe (T) 51' 52', Reece Lyon 90'	Attendance: 387; Referee: Alastair Grieve

=== Scottish League Two ===
2 August 2025 League Two	Dumbarton	2 – 1	Clyde	Dumbarton Football Stadium
15:00	OG 21', Ryan Blair 35'	Report	Marley Redfern 43'	Attendance: 912; Referee: Josh Hay

9 August 2025 League Two	The Spartans	1 – 2	Dumbarton	Ainslie Park
15:00	Mark Stowe 48'	Report	OG 17', Kai Kirkpatrick 32' Ryan Blair (yellow card) 24' (yellow-red card) 77'	Attendance: 512; Referee: Jordan Curran

16 August 2025 League Two	Dumbarton	1 – 1	Elgin City	Dumbarton Football Stadium
15:00	Scott Honeyman 74'	Report	Josh Walker 34'	Attendance: 673; Referee: Joel Kennedy; Man of the Match: Kai Kirkpatrick

23 August 2025 League Two	Annan Athletic	3 – 4	Dumbarton	Galabank Stadium
15:00	Max Kilsby 60', Aidan Smith 83' (pen.), Tam Muir 90+4'	Report	Leighton McIntosh 28' 50', Ally Roy 39' 57'	Attendance: 402; Referee: Stewart Luke

30 August 2025 League Two	Dumbarton	1 – 2	Edinburgh City	Dumbarton Football Stadium
15:00	OG 60'	Report	Robbie Mahon 39' 42' (pen.)	Attendance: 701; Referee: Jamie Wilkie; Man of the Match: Shay Kelly

13 September 2025 League Two	Forfar Athletic	2 – 3	Dumbarton	Station Park, Forfar
15:00	Martin Rennie 3', Jake Dolzansaki 11'	Report	Scott Honeyman 39', Leighton McIntosh 77' 88'	Attendance: 547; Referee: Connor Ashwood

20 September 2025 League Two	East Kilbride	1 – 1	Dumbarton	K Park Training Academy
15:00	John Robertson 45+1' (pen.)	Report	Scott Tomlinson 68'	Attendance: 389; Referee: Duncan Williams

27 September 2025 League Two	Dumbarton	1 – 2	Stranraer	Dumbarton Football Stadium
15:00	Mark Durnan 54'	Report	Mark Russell 38', James Dolan 90+2'	Attendance: 752; Referee: Colin Steven; Man of the Match: Mark Durnan

4 October 2025 League Two	Stirling Albion	2 – 2	Dumbarton	Forthbank Stadium
15:00	Ryan Shanley 41' Ross Cunningham 71' (pen.)	Report	Scott Honeyman 14', Gordon Walker 79'	Attendance: 374; Referee: Greg Soutar

18 October 2025 League Two	Dumbarton	1 – 2	The Spartans	Dumbarton Football Stadium
15:00	Leighton McIntosh 35'	Report	Bradley Whyte 15', Marc McNulty 41'	Attendance: 665; Referee: Ross Birrell; Man of the Match: Adam Livingstone

1 November 2025 League Two	Clyde	3 – 1	Dumbarton	New Douglas Park
15:00	OG 26', Jinky Hilton 51', Scott Williamson 88'	Report	Leighton McIntosh 41'	Attendance: 653; Referee: Graham Grainger

8 November 2025 League Two	Dumbarton	2 – 1	Annan Athletic	Dumbarton Football Stadium
15:00	Leighton McIntosh 11', Tony Wallace 71'	Report	Josh Dixon 56'	Attendance: 765; Referee: Jordan Curran; Man of the Match: Aron Lynas

15 November 2025 League Two	Elgin City	2 – 0	Dumbarton	Borough Briggs
15:00	Dylan Ross 58', Jack MacIver 74'	Report		Attendance: 663; Referee: Greg Soutar

22 November 2025 League Two	Dumbarton	1 – 4	Forfar Athletic	Dumbarton Football Stadium
15:00	Leighton McIntosh 15'	Report	Stuart Morrison 7', Angus Mailer 17', Scott Shepherd 27', Martin Rennie 54'	Attendance: 575; Referee: Daniel Graves

6 December 2025 League Two	Edinburgh City	4 – 3	Dumbarton	Meadowbank Stadium
15:00	Robbie Mahon 7' (pen.) 39' (pen.), Bradley Barrett 45+5', Innes Lawson 47'	Report	Leighton McIntosh 59' 70' (pen.), Tony Wallace 90+2' (pen.)	Attendance: 261; Referee: Stewart Luke

13 December 2025 League Two	Dumbarton	2 – 0	East Kilbride	Dumbarton Football Stadium
15:00	Dom Docherty 4', Mark Durnan 26'	Report		Attendance: 702; Referee: Jamie Wilkie; Man of the Match: Shay Kelly

20 December 2025 League Two	Stranraer	1 – 1	Dumbarton	Stair Park
15:00	Mark Russell 29'	Report	Kai Kirkpatrick 90+2'	Attendance: 502; Referee: Gary Hanvidge

27 December 2025 League Two	Dumbarton	1 – 2	Stirling Albion	Dumbarton Football Stadium
15:00	Scott Honeyman 72'	Report	Ryan Shanley 45+1', Adam Brown 80'	Attendance: 806; Referee: Abbie Hendry; Man of the Match: Scott Tomlinson

3 January 2026 League Two	The Spartans	2 – 0	Dumbarton	Ainslie Park
15:00	Bradley Whyte 38', Marc McNulty 67'	Report		Attendance: 407; Referee: Graham Grainger

24 January 2026 League Two	Dumbarton	2 – 2	Elgin City	Dumbarton Football Stadium
15:00	Josh Todd 62', Leighton McIntosh 74'	Report	Miko Virtanen 80', Ryan Sargent 83'	Attendance: 639; Referee: Peter Stuart; Man of the Match: Josh Todd

31 January 2026 League Two	Dumbarton	1 – 2	Edinburgh City	Dumbarton Football Stadium
15:00	Leighton McIntosh 30'	Report	Innes Lawson 39' 47'	Attendance: 711; Referee: Joel Kennedy; Man of the Match: Josh Todd

7 February 2026 League Two	Forfar Athletic	2 – 0	Dumbarton	Station Park, Forfar
15:00	Martin Rennie 54', Jake Dolzansaki 86'			Attendance: 508; Referee: Jamie McCunnie

10 February 2026 League Two	Annan Athletic	1 – 0	Dumbarton	Galabank Stadium
19:45	Joel Mumbongo 79'	Report		Referee: Josh Hay

21 February 2026 League Two	East Kilbride	3 – 1	Dumbarton	K Park Training Academy
15:00	Bobby McLuckie 30', João Baldé 35', John Robertson 38'	Report	Ali Omar 66'	Referee: Daniel Graves

24 February 2026 League Two	Dumbarton	0 – 0	Clyde	Dumbarton Football Stadium
19:45		Report		Attendance: 484; Referee: Gary Hanvidge; Man of the Match: Ali Omar

28 February 2026 League Two	Stirling Albion	1 – 1	Dumbarton	Forthbank Stadium
15:00	Russell McLean 40' (pen.)	Report	Mark Durnan 90+1'	Attendance: 660; Referee: Josh Hay

7 March 2026 League Two	Dumbarton	3 – 0	The Spartans	Dumbarton Football Stadium
15:00	Gordon Walker 51', Leighton McIntosh 72', Scott Honeyman 83'	Report		Attendance: 651; Referee: Lewis Hogarth; Man of the Match: Ali Omar

10 March 2026 League Two	Dumbarton	2 – 0	Stranraer	Dumbarton Football Stadium
19:45	Mark Durnan 2', Scott Honeyman 17'	Report		Attendance: 585; Referee: Greg Soutar; Man of the Match: Aidan Rice

14 March 2026 League Two	Elgin City	1 – 1	Dumbarton	Dumbarton Football Stadium
15:00	Ryan Sargent 34'		Leighton McIntosh 51'	Attendance: 676; Referee: Abbie Hendry

21 March 2026 League Two	Dumbarton	2 – 1	Annan Athletic	Dumbarton Football Stadium
15:00	Scott Honeyman 58', Leighton McIntosh 63'	Report	Keith Watson 90+4'	Attendance: 618; Referee: Connor Ashwood; Man of the Match: Kristian Webster

28 March 2026 League Two	Dumbarton	2 – 2	Forfar Athletic	Dumbarton Football Stadium
15:00	Leighton McIntosh 71', Scott Honeyman 79'	Report	Jake Sutherland 9' (pen.) Callum Wilson 21'	Attendance: 694; Referee: Gavin Duncan; Man of the Match: Leighton McIntosh

4 April 2026 League Two	Stranraer	1 – 1	Dumbarton	Stair Park
15:00	Evan Dunne 85'	Report	Scott Honeyman 37'	Attendance: 454; Referee: Gary Hanvidge

11 April 2026 League Two	Dumbarton	2 – 1	Stirling Albion	Dumbarton Football Stadium
15:00	Scott Tomlinson 39', Scott Honeyman 79', Kai Kirkpatrick (red card) 90+6'	Report	Dale Hilson 54'	Attendance: 725; Referee: Lewis Hogarth; Man of the Match: Scott Honeyman

18 April 2026 League Two	Clyde	2 – 0	Dumbarton	New Douglas Park
15:00	Scott Williamson 49' 57'	Report		Attendance: 727; Referee: Greg Soutar

25 April 2026 League Two	Dumbarton	0 – 1	East Kilbride	Dumbarton Football Stadium
15:00		Report	Bobby McLuckie 9'	Attendance: 954; Referee: Cameron Stirling; Man of the Match: Mark Durnan

2 May 2026 League Two	Edinburgh	5 – 0	Dumbarton	Meadowbank Stadium
15:00	Iserhienrhien 6' 39', Lawson 24', C.Williams 27', Zaid 62'	Report	Kai Kirkpatrick (red card) 22'	Attendance: 346; Referee: Daniel Graves

=== Scottish Cup ===
25 October 2025 Second round	Dumbarton	2 - 0	Tayport	Dumbarton Football Stadium
15:00	Morgyn Neill 37', Gordon Walker 51'	Report		Attendance: 540; Referee: Scott Donohoe; Man of the Match: Gordon Walker

29 November 2025 Third round	Dumbarton	0 - 4	Auchinleck Talbot	Dumbarton Football Stadium
15:00		Report	Connor Boyd 45+1' 62', Kyle McAvoy 71' 75'	Attendance: 1,052; Referee: Sean Murdoch

=== Challenge Cup ===
12 August 2025 League stage	Dumbarton	4 - 2	St Mirren B	Dumbarton Football Stadium
19:45	Scott Tomlinson 20', Chris Johnston 35', Tony Wallace 61', Dominic Docherty 86'	Report	Evan Mooney 55', Fraser Taylor 69'	Attendance: 317; Referee: Graham Grainger

26 August 2025 League stage	Dumbarton	1 - 0	Hearts B	Dumbarton Football Stadium
19:45	Scott Honeyman 70'	Report		Attendance: 276; Referee: Alastair Grieve; Man of the Match: Scott Honeyman

6 September 2025 League stage	East Fife	1 - 1	Dumbarton	New Bayview
15:00	Nathan Austin 34'	Report	Scott Honeyman 90+1'	Attendance: 578; Referee: Duncan Williams

23 September 2025 League stage	Dumbarton	3 - 3	Kelty Hearts	Dumbarton Football Stadium
19:45	Scott Honeyman 21', OG 40', Tony Wallace 45+1'	Report	Aaron Arnott 24' (pen.) 37' (pen.), Robbie Cole 25'	Attendance: 312; Referee: Gavin Duncan; Man of the Match: Scott Honeyman

8 October 2025 League stage	Dumbarton	1 - 0	Rangers B	Dumbarton Football Stadium
15:00	Kristian Webster 57'	Report		Attendance: 617; Referee: Joel Kennedy; Man of the Match: Kristian Webster

19 November 2025 League stage	Dumbarton	0 - 2	Stenhousemuir	Dumbarton Football Stadium
19:45		Report	Ross Taylor 45+9', Euan O'Reilly 86'	Attendance: 253; Referee: Joel Kennedy; Man of the Match: Adam Livingstone

16 December 2025 Second Round	Dumbarton	0 – 9	Inverness Caledonian Thistle	Dumbarton Football Stadium
19:45		Report	Bavidge 3', 27', 31', 37', MacLeod 22', Mckay 23', 81', Longstaff 43', Millen 65' (pen.)	Attendance: 326
Note: Rearranged due to the second rearrangement of Inverness' Scottish Cup tie with Tranent to 8 December 2025.

=== Scottish League Cup ===
==== Matches ====
15 July 2025 Group stage	Dumbarton	1 - 0	Stirling Albion	Dumbarton Football Stadium
19:45	OG 52'	Report	Ross Cunningham (red card) 49'	Attendance: 455; Referee: Jamie Wilkie; Man of the Match: Thomas Falconer

19 July 2025 Group stage	Dumbarton	0 - 4	Dunfermline Athletic	Dumbarton Football Stadium
15:00			Josh Cooper 14' 59', Chris Kane 45+1', Andrew Tod 55'	Attendance: 1,026; Referee: George Calder

23 July 2025 Group stage	Hearts	4 - 0	Dumbarton	Tynecastle Park
19:45	Shankland 17'; Steinwender 45+3'; Kyziridis 52'; Braga 72'	BBC Report		Attendance: 8,722; Referee: Iain Snedden

26 July 2025 Group stage	Hamilton Academical	0 - 1	Dumbarton	Broadwood Stadium
15:00		Report	Ally Roy 45'	Attendance: 290; Referee: Joel Kennedy

== Player statistics ==
As of 19:28, 2 May 2026 (UTC)

=== All competitions ===
#	Position	Player	Starts	Subs	Unused subs	Goals	Red cards (red card)	Yellow cards (yellow card)
6	MF	(Scotland) Ryan Blair	28	5	13	1	1	3
20	FW	(Scotland) Steven Boyd (Trialist)	0	1	0	0	0	0
12	FW	(Scotland) Aaron Brown	2	5	9	0	0	0
3	DF	(Scotland) Cammy Clark	11	2	15	0	0	1
18	MF	(Scotland) Dominic Docherty	25	6	1	2	0	6
20	FW	(United States) Camryn Donald	0	1	2	0	0	0
24	DF	(Scotland) Michael Doyle	11	2	0	0	0	3
9	FW	(Scotland) Jack Duncan	4	7	4	0	0	1
5	DF	(Scotland) Mark Durnan	36	3	4	4	0	11
19	GK	(Scotland) Ollie Ecrepont	9	0	19	0	0	0
17	MF	(Scotland) Thomas Falconer	1	7	11	0	0	1
12	MF	(Scotland) Aedan Gilfedder	2	3	19	0	0	1
13	GK	(Scotland) Robbie Hemfrey (Trialist)	0	0	1	0	0	0
21	MF	(Scotland) Scott Honeyman	32	14	3	13	0	2
16	MF	(Germany) Tobi Joseph	4	4	8	0	0	4
22	MF	(Scotland) Chris Johnston	7	12	10	1	0	2
28	GK	(Scotland) Shay Kelly	22	0	17	0	0	2
27	MF	(Scotland) Kai Kirkpatrick	29	9	3	2	2	7
14	DF	(Scotland) Adam Livingstone	37	3	5	0	0	5
1	GK	(Northern Ireland) Brett Long	9	1	6	0	0	1
2	DF	(Scotland) Aron Lynas	12	9	13	0	0	1
24	DF	(Scotland) Derin Marshall	3	0	10	0	0	1
20	MF	(Scotland) Max McArthur	2	0	10	0	0	0
16	MF	(Scotland) Shay McArthur	0	0	4	0	0	0
9	FW	(Scotland) Theo McCormick	0	8	2	0	0	1
8	MF	(Scotland) Carrick McEvoy	2	6	13	0	0	0
15	FW	(Scotland) Leighton McIntosh	42	5	0	16	0	5
23	DF	(Scotland) Morgyn Neill	25	6	5	1	0	6
20	MF	(Scotland) Murray Nicol	0	0	3	0	0	0
3	DF	(Somalia) Ali Omar	16	0	0	1	0	1
20	FW	(Zimbabwe) Dean Rhappozzoh	1	1	5	0	0	0
19	GK	(Scotland) Aidan Rice	9	0	1	0	0	1
10	FW	(Northern Ireland) Ally Roy	18	21	5	3	0	3
22	MF	(Scotland) Alexander Smith	7	1	0	0	0	0
13	GK	(Scotland) Daryl Smith	0	0	1	0	0	0
8	MF	(England) Josh Todd	13	0	0	1	0	0
7	MF	(Scotland) Scott Tomlinson	34	9	0	3	0	6
11	MF	(Scotland) Tony Wallace	22	16	11	4	0	6
25	DF	(Republic of Ireland) Gordon Walker	32	7	6	3	0	5
4	DF	(Scotland) Kristian Webster	32	5	2	1	0	4

=== Captains ===
No.	P	Name	Country	No. games	Notes
5	DF	Mark Durnan	(Scotland)	36	Club captain
11	MF	Tony Wallace	(Scotland)	12	Vice-captain
23	DF	Morgyn Neill	(Scotland)	1	Captain for Frank McKeown's first game against Edinburgh City on December 6, with Durnan injured and Wallace on the bench.

Last updated: As of match played 23:53, 2 May 2026 (UTC)
Source: Competitive match reports.
Competitive matches only
Matches started as captain only
Country: FIFA nationality; No.: Squad number; P: Position; Name: Player name; No. Games: Number of games started as captain.

=== Management statistics ===
Last Updated 19:37 May 2, 2026.

Name	From	To	P	W	D	L	Win%
Stephen Farrell	21 June 2025	30 November 2025	26	11	5	10	42.30
Frank McKeown	5 December 2025	Present	23	5	7	11	21.74

== League table ==
Pos	Team	Pld	W	D	L	GF	GA	GD	Pts	Promotion, qualification or relegation
6	Elgin City	36	11	11	14	51	55	−4	44	
7	Annan Athletic	36	10	11	15	47	58	−11	41	
8	Stirling Albion	36	9	11	16	46	63	−17	38	
9	Dumbarton	36	10	10	16	47	61	−14	35 (Note: Dumbarton were deducted five points for entering administration during the previous season.)	
10	Edinburgh City (O)	36	10	9	17	45	72	−27	24 (Note: Edinburgh City were deducted 15 points due to an insolvency event.)	Qualification for the League Two play-off final

Rules for classification: 1) Points; 2) Goal difference; 3) Goals scored; 4) Head-to-head points; 5) Head-to-head goal difference; 6) Play-off (only for deciding promotion, play-off participation and relegation).
(O) Play-off winners

== League Cup table ==
Pos	Team	Pld	W	PW	PL	L	GF	GA	GD	Pts	Qualification	HOM	DNF	DUM	HAM	STI
1	Heart of Midlothian	4	4	0	0	0	16	1	+15	12	Qualification for the second round	—	4–1	4–0	—	—
2	Dunfermline Athletic	4	3	0	0	1	9	5	+4	9		—	—	—	2–1	2–0
3	Dumbarton	4	2	0	0	2	2	8	−6	6		—	0–4	—	—	1–0
4	Hamilton Academical	4	1	0	0	3	3	7	−4	3		0–4	—	0–1	—	—
5	Stirling Albion	4	0	0	0	4	0	9	−9	0		0–4	—	—	0–2	—

Rules for classification: 1) goal difference, 2) goals scored, 3) away goals scored, 4) matches won, 5) away matches won, 6) drawing of lots.

== Challenge Cup table ==
Pos	Team	Pld	W	D	L	GF	GA	GD	Pts	Qualification
9	The Spartans	6	3	2	1	14	8	+6	11	Advance to Second round
10	Elgin City	6	3	2	1	11	9	+2	11	Advance to Second round
11	Dumbarton	6	3	2	1	10	8	+2	11	Advance to Second round
12	Annan Athletic	6	3	1	2	15	10	+5	10	Advance to Second round
13	Alloa Athletic	6	3	1	2	17	14	+3	10	Advance to Second round

Source: SPFL
Rules for classification: 1) Points; 2) Goal difference; 3) Goals scored; 4) Head-to-to head points; 5) Head-to-head goal difference; 6) Play-off (only for deciding qualification).
