= 2023–24 Scottish Challenge Cup =

Tournament details
- Country: Scotland; Northern Ireland; Wales
- Dates: 1 August 2023 – 24 March 2024
- Teams: 53

Final positions
- Champions: Airdrieonians
- Runners-up: The New Saints

Tournament statistics
- Matches played: 52
- Goals scored: 173 (3.33 per match)
- Top goal scorer(s): Brad Young (5 goals)
- All statistics correct as of 24 March 2024.

The 2023–24 Scottish Challenge Cup, known as the SPFL Trust Trophy due to sponsorship reasons, was the 32nd season of the competition. The total number of participating clubs was 53, including clubs from Wales and Northern Ireland. The competition began on 1 August 2023 with the first round and the final took place on 24 March 2024.

Thirty teams from the Championship, League One and League Two competed, along with four teams from the Highland Football League and four from the Lowland Football League. In addition to this, Under-21 teams from 11 of the 12 clubs competing in the Scottish Premiership were represented. This season also included guest clubs, with two sides each coming from Northern Ireland's NIFL Premiership (Cliftonville and Coleraine) and the Welsh Cymru Premier (TNS and Bala Town).

The defending champions were Hamilton Academical, who lost 4–1 to Raith Rovers in the Quarter final.

== Format ==
Round	Date	Fixtures	Clubs	New entries
First Round	1–2 August 2023	11	53 → 42	3 teams from 2022–23 Scottish League Two (8th–10th); 4 teams from 2022–23 Lowland Football League (1st–4th); 4 teams from 2022–23 Highland Football League (1st–4th); 11 U21 teams from 2023–24 Scottish Premiership
Second Round	15–16 August 2023	10	42 → 32	2 teams from 2022–23 Scottish League One (9th–10th); 7 teams from 2022–23 Scottish League Two (1st–7th)
Third Round	9–10 September 2023	16	32 → 16	Teams from 2022–23 Scottish Championship (2nd–10th); 8 teams from 2022–23 Scottish League One (1st–8th); 2 teams from 2022–23 NIFL Premiership (4th and 6th); 2 teams from 2022–23 Cymru Premier (1st and 5th)
Fourth Round	14–15 October 2023	8	16 → 8	
Quarter-finals	18–19 November 2023	4	8 → 4	
Semi-finals	3–4 February 2024	2	4 → 2	
Final	24 March 2024	1	2 → 1	

== First round ==
The first round featured 3 clubs from 2022 to 2023 Scottish League Two, 4 clubs from the 2022–23 Scottish Highland Football League, 4 clubs from the 2022–23 Scottish Lowland Football League and 11 of the 12 under-21 teams of the 2023–24 Scottish Premiership, with Ross County not entering an under-21 team.

The draw was made on 4 July 2023 at 13:00 and broadcast live on the SPFL YouTube Channel. The draw was regionalised and all non-Under 21 teams were seeded. The matches were played on 1 and 2 August 2023.

=== North Section ===
==== Draw ====
Teams that entered the competition in the first round.

Seeded Teams	Unseeded Teams
Elgin City; Brechin City; Buckie Thistle; Brora Rangers; Formartine United	Aberdeen B; Dundee B; Heart of Midlothian B; Hibernian B; St Johnstone B

==== Matches ====
1 August 2023	Brechin City	2–2 (5–3 p)	Heart of Midlothian B	Brechin
19:30	MacLeod 22'; McGrath 36'		Kirk 76' (pen.); Friel 80'	Stadium: Glebe Park; Attendance: 474; Referee: George Calder
	Penalties
	Loudon (penalty scored); McGrath (penalty scored); MacLeod (penalty scored); McArthur (penalty scored); Heenan (penalty scored)		(penalty scored) Kirk; (penalty missed) Sandilands; (penalty scored) Wilson; (penalty scored) McLuckie

1 August 2023	Elgin City	2–0	St Johnstone B	Elgin
19:30	MacLeman 20'; Barron 75'			Stadium: Borough Briggs; Attendance: 478; Referee: Daniel Graves

2 August 2023	Hibernian B	1–1 (3–2 p)	Formartine United	Edinburgh
19:30	Landers 45'		Park 42'	Stadium: Meadowbank Stadium; Attendance: 107; Referee: Alex Shepherd
	Penalties
	McAllister (penalty scored); MacIntyre (penalty scored); Megwa (penalty scored); Zaid (penalty scored)		(penalty scored) Park; (penalty missed) Campbell; (penalty missed) Rodger; (penalty scored) Smith

2 August 2023	Brora Rangers	1–1 (2–4 p)	Aberdeen B	Brora
19:45	J. MacRae 28'		Bavidge 82'	Stadium: Dudgeon Park; Attendance: 275; Referee: Ryan Lee
	Penalties
	A. MacRae (penalty missed); Nicolson (penalty missed); Brindle (penalty scored); Sutherland (penalty scored)		(penalty missed) Hamilton; (penalty scored) Marshall; (penalty scored) Lobban; (penalty scored) Emslie; (penalty scored) Bavidge

2 August 2023	Dundee B	4–0	Buckie Thistle	Forfar
20:00	Mohammed 1'; Wilkie 17'; Mutale 23'; Anderson 61'			Stadium: Station Park; Attendance: 116; Referee: Colin Whyte

=== South Section ===
==== Draw ====
Teams that entered the competition in the first round.

Seeded Teams	Unseeded Teams
Bonnyrigg Rose; Albion Rovers; The Spartans; University of Stirling; Tranent; East Kilbride	Celtic B; Kilmarnock B; Livingston B; Motherwell B; Rangers B; St Mirren B

==== Matches ====
1 August 2023	St Mirren B	2–2 (2–4 p)	Albion Rovers	Paisley
19:30	Turner 51'; Sutherland 90'		Joseph 27'; Fagan 41'	Stadium: St Mirren Park; Attendance: 363; Referee: Greg Soutar
	Penalties
	Gilmartin (penalty missed); Gaffney (penalty scored); Foster (penalty scored); Lennon (penalty missed)		(penalty scored) Joseph; (penalty scored) Wilson; (penalty scored) McCaw; (penalty scored) McMahon

1 August 2023	Tranent	0–0 (3–1 p)	Motherwell B	Tranent
19:45				Stadium: Foresters Park; Attendance: 200; Referee: Jordan Curran
	Penalties
	Higginbotham (penalty scored); Ross (penalty scored); Watson (penalty scored)		(penalty scored) McGinley; (penalty missed) Maguire; (penalty missed) Adam; (penalty missed) Ross

1 August 2023	The Spartans	0–3	Rangers B	Edinburgh
19:45			Fraser 37'; Ishaka 48'; Lowry 57' (pen.)	Stadium: Ainslie Park; Attendance: 273; Referee: Ross Hardie

1 August 2023	Kilmarnock B	3–1	Bonnyrigg Rose	Kilmarnock
19:45	Wales 18'; Warnock 21'; Brown 52'		Faye 46'	Stadium: Rugby Park; Attendance: 181; Referee: Andy Gamble

2 August 2023	University of Stirling	4–0	Livingston B	Stirling
19:45	Russell 3'; Malcolm 70'; McIvor-Redwood 72'; Tallen 87'			Stadium: Forthbank Stadium; Attendance: 98; Referee: Duncan Nicolson

2 August 2023	Celtic B	1–3	East Kilbride	Airdrie
19:45	Vata 12'		Biggar 6'; Samson 57'; Kelly 82'	Stadium: Excelsior Stadium; Attendance: 338; Referee: Peter Stuart

== Second round ==
The second round featured the 11 winners from the previous round, along with 2 clubs from 2022 to 2023 Scottish League One and 7 clubs from 2022 to 2023 Scottish League Two.

The draw for the second round was also made on 4 July 2023 at 13:00 on the live broadcast from the SPFL YouTube Channel. The draw was regionalised, but not seeded. The matches were played on 15 and 16 August 2023.

=== North Section ===
==== Draw ====
Teams that entered the competition in the second round.

- Peterhead
- East Fife
- Forfar Athletic

==== Matches ====
15 August 2023	Brechin City	0–4	Hibernian B	Brechin
19:30			Molotnikov 13'; Megwa 37'; Smith 77', 83'	Stadium: Glebe Park; Attendance: 400; Referee: Duncan Nicolson

15 August 2023	Aberdeen B	3–5	Peterhead	Pitmedden
19:45	Stewart 18'; Bavidge 56' (pen.); Marshall 72'		Ross 49'; McCarthy 62'; Jordon Brown 82', 83'; Shanks 86'	Stadium: North Lodge Park; Attendance: 384; Referee: Ross Clark

15 August 2023	Dundee B	0–0 (3–5 p)	East Fife	Dundee
19:45				Stadium: Dens Park; Attendance: 309; Referee: Greg Soutar
	Penalties
	Richardson (penalty missed); Lamb (penalty scored); Barnett (penalty scored); Robertson (penalty scored)		(penalty scored) Murdoch; (penalty scored) Shepherd; (penalty scored) Healy; (penalty scored) Newton; (penalty scored) Walls

15 August 2023	Elgin City	0–0 (4–3 p)	Forfar Athletic	Elgin
19:45				Stadium: Borough Briggs; Attendance: 349; Referee: Jordan Curran
	Penalties
	Dingwall (penalty scored); MacEwan (penalty scored); Wright (penalty missed); Harvey (penalty scored); Cruickshank (penalty scored)		(penalty scored) Munro; (penalty scored) Whatley; (penalty missed) Morrison; (penalty scored) Whyte; (penalty missed) Thomson

=== South Section ===
==== Draw ====
Teams that entered the competition in the second round.

- Clyde
- Stirling Albion
- Dumbarton
- Annan Athletic
- Stenhousemuir
- Stranraer

==== Matches ====
15 August 2023	Albion Rovers	2–0	Tranent	Coatbridge
19:45	Joseph 75', 87'			Stadium: Cliftonhill; Attendance: 157; Referee: Andy Gamble

15 August 2023	Annan Athletic	3–1	Stranraer	Annan
19:45	Kilsby 44'; Docherty 51'; Smith 55'		McDonald 38'	Stadium: Galabank; Attendance: 301; Referee: Gavin Duncan

15 August 2023	Stirling Albion	0–3	East Kilbride	Stirling
19:45			Lyon 18'; Kelly 82'; Stirling 84'	Stadium: Forthbank Stadium; Attendance: 329; Referee: Stewart Luke

15 August 2023	Stenhousemuir	1–2	Rangers B	Stenhousemuir
20:00	Lynch 60'		McPake 59'; Lovelace 90'	Stadium: Ochilview Park; Attendance: 269; Referee: Ryan Lee

16 August 2023	Clyde	1–3	University of Stirling	Hamilton
19:45	Scullion 55'		McKinlay 33'; Šuľa 86' (o.g.); Stokes 90'	Stadium: New Douglas Park; Attendance: 222; Referee: Alex Shepherd

16 August 2023	Kilmarnock B	1–1 (8–9 p)	Dumbarton	Kilmarnock
19:45	Wales 65'		Pignatiello 40'	Stadium: Rugby Park; Attendance: 300; Referee: Daniel Graves
	Penalties
	Warnock (penalty scored); A. Brown (penalty scored); Wales (penalty scored); Brannan (penalty scored); Davies (penalty scored); Sanders (penalty scored); E. Brown (penalty scored); Craic (penalty scored); Smith (penalty missed)		(penalty scored) Hilton; (penalty scored) Wilson; (penalty scored) Orsi; (penalty scored) Blair; (penalty scored) T. Wallace; (penalty scored) Wylde; (penalty scored) MacLean; (penalty scored) Durnan; (penalty scored) Lynas

== Third round ==
The third round featured the 10 winners from the previous round, along with the bottom club from 2022 to 2023 Scottish Premiership, 2nd-10th from 2022 to 2023 Scottish Championship, 8 clubs from 2022 to 2023 Scottish League One, 2 clubs from 2022 to 2023 NIFL Premiership and 2 clubs from 2022 to 2023 Cymru Premier.

=== Draw ===
The draw was made on 17 August 2023 at 13:00 live on the SPFL YouTube Channel.

Teams that entered the competition in the third round.

Championship	League One	Teams from other countries
Airdrieonians; Arbroath; Ayr United; Dundee United; Dunfermline Athletic; Greenock Morton; Inverness Caledonian Thistle; Partick Thistle; Queen's Park; Raith Rovers	Alloa Athletic; Cove Rangers; Edinburgh City; Falkirk; Hamilton Academical; Kelty Hearts; Montrose; Queen of the South	NIFL Premiership: Cliftonville; Coleraine; Cymru Premier: The New Saints; Bala Town

==== Matches ====
5 September 2023	Ayr United	0–1	Falkirk	Ayr
19:45			Henderson 30'	Stadium: Somerset Park; Attendance: 1,423; Referee: Steven Kirkland

8 September 2023	Hibernian B	0–3	The New Saints	Edinburgh
18:00			McGregor 4' (o.g.); Clark 36'; Young 54'	Stadium: Meadowbank Stadium; Attendance: 119; Referee: Iain Snedden

9 September 2023	East Fife	2–1	Albion Rovers	Methil
13:00	Page 56'; McManus 79'		Joseph 31'	Stadium: Bayview Stadium; Attendance: 448; Referee: Lloyd Wilson

9 September 2023	Raith Rovers	3–0	Cliftonville	Kirkcaldy
14:00	Masson 50'; Vaughan 69'; Hamilton 73'			Stadium: Stark's Park; Attendance: 1,561; Referee: Grant Irvine

9 September 2023	Edinburgh City	1–4	East Kilbride	Edinburgh
15:00	Peter 61'		Flanagan 43'; McDonald 47'; Roy 63'; Lyon 76'	Stadium: Meadowbank Stadium; Attendance: 231; Referee: Dan McFarlane

9 September 2023	Annan Athletic	0–2	Peterhead	Annan
15:00			McCarthy 15'; Shanks 55'	Stadium: Galabank; Attendance: 326; Referee: Scott Lambie

9 September 2023	Cove Rangers	0–2	Montrose	Aberdeen
15:00			Brown 58'; Hester 87'	Stadium: Balmoral Stadium; Attendance: 520; Referee: Alastair Grieve

9 September 2023	Dumbarton	1–3	Kelty Hearts	Dumbarton
15:00	Ruth 34'		Lyon 11'; Biabi 16', 76'	Stadium: Dumbarton Football Stadium; Attendance: 427; Referee: Duncan Williams

9 September 2023	University of Stirling	2–3	Airdrieonians	Stirling
15:00	McAninch 18', 54' (pen.)		O'Connor 36'; McCabe 37'; McStravick 58'	Stadium: Forthbank Stadium; Attendance: 609; Referee: Alan Muir

9 September 2023	Greenock Morton	2–1	Elgin City	Greenock
15:00	Muirhead 30'; McGrattan 63'		Harvey 16'	Stadium: Cappielow; Attendance: 1,016; Referee: Ross Hardie

9 September 2023	Dundee United	3–0	Dunfermline Athletic	Dundee
15:00	Moult 18'; Comrie 34' (o.g.); Glass 37'			Stadium: Tannadice Park; Attendance: 2,408; Referee: Craig Napier

9 September 2023	Arbroath	4–2	Inverness Caledonian Thistle	Arbroath
15:00	Gold 34'; O'Brien 41'; Stewart 70'; Steele 84'		Brooks 43'; Hyde 90'	Stadium: Gayfield Park; Attendance: 780; Referee: Steven McLean

9 September 2023	Partick Thistle	2–3	Queen of the South	Glasgow
15:00	Lawless 11' (pen.); Stanway 48'		McGuffie 7'; Reilly 24'; Ambrose 87'	Stadium: Firhill Stadium; Attendance: 2,307; Referee: Euan Anderson

9 September 2023	Coleraine	1–3	Hamilton Academical	Coleraine, Northern Ireland
15:45	Lynch 24'		Smith 11'; Zanatta 48'; Barjonas 82'	Stadium: The Showgrounds; Attendance: 906; Referee: Chris Morrison

9 September 2023	Bala Town	0–3	Queen's Park	Bala, Wales
17:15			Turner 20'; Hepburn 44'; Paton 90'	Stadium: Maes Tegid; Attendance: 317; Referee: Aaron Wyn Jones

26 September 2023	Rangers B	4–1	Alloa Athletic	Greenock
19:45	McCausland 5'; Curtis 86'; Graham 88'; Lyall 90' (pen.)		Neill 44'	Stadium: Cappielow; Attendance: 139; Referee: Lloyd Wilson

== Fourth round ==
The draw was made on 14 September 2023 at 13:00 live on the SPFL YouTube Channel.

No new teams enter in this round.

Teams in Italics were unknown at the time of the draw.

Championship	League One	League Two	Lowland League	Premiership B teams	Teams from other countries
Airdrieonians; Arbroath; Dundee United; Greenock Morton; Queen's Park; Raith Rovers	Falkirk; Hamilton Academical; Kelty Hearts; Montrose; Queen of the South	East Fife; Peterhead	East Kilbride	Rangers B	Cymru Premier: The New Saints

=== Matches ===
14 October 2023	Raith Rovers	3–1	Montrose	Kirkcaldy
15:00	Smith 32'; Easton 57'; Mullin 67'		Watson 72'	Stadium: Stark's Park; Attendance: 1,388; Referee: Lloyd Wilson

14 October 2023	East Kilbride	2–5	Hamilton Academical	East Kilbride
15:00	McGowan 31'; Ferguson 53'		Mumbongo 17'; Arnott 20' (o.g.); MacDonald 37' (pen.), 80'; Murray 38'	Stadium: K-Park Training Academy; Attendance: 583; Referee: Chris Fordyce

14 October 2023	Falkirk	1–0	Queen's Park	Falkirk
15:00	Allan 5' (pen.)			Stadium: Falkirk Stadium; Attendance: 2,427; Referee: Scott Lambie

14 October 2023	Queen of the South	1–2	Arbroath	Dumfries
15:00	Doherty 12'		Bird 54'; McKenna 90'	Stadium: Palmerston Park; Attendance: 786; Referee: Duncan Williams

14 October 2023	Greenock Morton	4–1	Kelty Hearts	Greenock
15:00	Muirhead 3', 56', 64'; Crawford 70'		Lyon 11'	Stadium: Cappielow; Attendance: 1,056; Referee: Steven Kirkland

14 October 2023	The New Saints	2–2 (5–4 p)	East Fife	Oswestry, England
17:15	Young 14'; Brobbel 76' (pen.)		Trouten 35'; McManus 60'	Stadium: Park Hall; Attendance: 512; Referee: Huw Jones
	Penalties
	Cieślewicz (penalty scored); Holden (penalty scored); Brobbel (penalty scored); Young (penalty scored); Routledge (penalty scored)		McManus (penalty scored); Walls (penalty scored); Nicol (penalty scored); Trouten (penalty scored); Mitchell (penalty missed)

14 October 2023	Peterhead	0–2	Dundee United	Peterhead
17:30			Middleton 7'; Watt 71'	Stadium: Balmoor Stadium; Attendance: 1,322; Referee: Calum Scott

7 November 2023	Rangers B	2–4	Airdrieonians	Greenock
19:45	Gentles 5'; Dowell 62'		Gallagher 11'; McGill 22', 54'; McCabe 90'	Stadium: Cappielow; Attendance: N/A; Referee: Steven Kirkland

== Quarter-finals ==
The quarter-final and semi-final draws were made on 19 October 2023 at 13:00 live on the SPFL YouTube Channel.

Teams in Italics were unknown at the time of the quarter-final draw.

Championship	League One	Teams from other countries
Airdrieonians; Arbroath; Dundee United; Greenock Morton; Raith Rovers	Falkirk; Hamilton Academical	Cymru Premier: The New Saints

=== Matches ===
17 November 2023	Falkirk	4–2	Dundee United	Falkirk
19:40	Morrison 4', 71'; Lang 65'; Yeats 69'		Cudjoe 23'; Watt 33'	Stadium: Falkirk Stadium; Attendance: 2,891; Referee: Grant Irvine

17 November 2023	Hamilton Academical	1–4	Raith Rovers	Hamilton
19:45	Zanatta 73'		Stanton 8'; Hamilton 58', 61'; Easton 90'	Stadium: New Douglas Park; Attendance: 971; Referee: Iain Snedden

18 November 2023	The New Saints	4–1	Arbroath	Oswestry, England
14:30	Clark 29'; Young 37', 85'; Cieślewicz 80'		Bird 9'	Stadium: Park Hall; Attendance: 587; Referee: Bryn Markham-Jones

18 November 2023	Greenock Morton	0–0 (5–6 p)	Airdrieonians	Greenock
15:00				Stadium: Cappielow; Attendance: 1,269; Referee: Ross Hardie
	Penalties
	Gillespie (penalty scored); Oakley (penalty scored); Blues (penalty scored); Crawford (penalty scored); Wilson (penalty scored); McGrattan (penalty missed)		Fordyce (penalty scored); Telfer (penalty scored); McCabe (penalty scored); Todorov (penalty scored); Frizzell (penalty scored); Ballantyne (penalty scored)

== Semi-finals ==
=== Matches ===
2 February 2024	Raith Rovers	0–1	Airdrieonians	Kirkcaldy
19:40			Todorov 6'	Stadium: Stark's Park; Attendance: 2,640; Referee: Colin Steven

3 February 2024	Falkirk	0–1	The New Saints	Falkirk
19:40			Young 26'	Stadium: Falkirk Stadium; Attendance: 3,582; Referee: Chris Graham

== Final ==
24 March 2024	The New Saints	1–2	Airdrieonians	Falkirk
16:15	Clark 12'		McStravick 22'; Todorov 67' (pen.)	Stadium: Falkirk Stadium; Attendance: 3,191; Referee: Matthew MacDermid
