= 2024–25 Dumbarton F.C. season =

Dumbarton
2024–25 season
- Chairman: Dr Neil MacKay
- Manager: Stevie Farrell
- Stadium: Dumbarton Football Stadium
- League One: 10th
- League Cup: Group stage
- Challenge Cup: Third round
- Top goalscorer: League: Michael Ruth (9); All: Michael Ruth (11)
- Average home league attendance: 602

The 2024–25 season is Dumbarton Football Club's first back in Scottish League One, the third tier of Scottish football, having won the Scottish League Two promotion play-offs the previous season. Dumbarton are also competing in the Scottish Cup, the Scottish League Cup, and the Challenge Cup.

== Story of the season ==
=== May ===
Following promotion to Scottish League One the club's first friendly was announced on 21 May, with Sons facing Hebburn Town on 6 July. On 23 May forward Marc Kelly, midfielder Luca Vata and goalkeeper Harry Broun were released. With new deals offered to Finlay Gray, Michael Ruth, Aron Lynas and Kalvin Orsi. On 29 May, forward Michael Ruth who had scored 15 times the previous season, signed a new season long deal with the club. However midfielders Blair Malcolm and Callum Wilson both departed the club. The same day the Sons were drawn to face East Kilbride, Airdrieonians, Aberdeen and Queen of the South in the Scottish League Cup. On 31 May defender Matthew Shiels became the club's first signing of the summer, returning to the club for a third spell from Cove Rangers.

=== June ===
Sons made a double signing on 1 June with Cameron Clark joining from Stirling Albion and Michael Miller from Broomhill. Midfielder Finlay Gray and winger Kalvin Orsi also agreed new season-long deals. On 7 June, winger Craig McGuffie became the club's fourth new addition - joining from Queen of the South. The same day, winger Ross MacLean left the club - joining Forfar Athletic for an undisclosed fee - but goalkeeper Patrick O'Neil signed a new season long deal. On 8 June defender Aron Lynas extended his stay - signing a season long deal to take him into a third campaign with the club. A third friendly of pre-season was arranged for 2 July, with Sons travelling to Ayrshire to face Glenafton Athletic. Mouhamed Niang was the club's next new addition, joining on a year long deal from Cove Rangers on 19 June. On 26 June defender Sean Crighton left the club to become the new head coach of Queen's Park's B team. Sons' first pre-season friendly ended in a 3–2 defeat to 2023–24 League One champions Falkirk - with Jinky Hilton scoring both goals.

=== July ===
Sons' second friendly match finished in a 4–0 victory against Glenafton Athletic. Carlo Pignatiello scored a brace with Jinky Hilton and a trialist striker also on target, with all the goals coming before half-time. The pre-season campaign was rounded off with another big away win, this time 6–1 against Hebburn Town in Newcastle. Again Pignatiello and the trialist striker got on the scoresheet, with David Wilson, Finlay Gray and Michael Ruth's brace completing the scoring. On 9 July the Dumbarton Football Stadium was renamed The Marbill Coaches Stadium in a new sponsorship deal. The first competitive game of the season finished in a 1–1 draw with East Kilbride. Kalvin Orsi getting Sons' goal, with Kilby claiming the bonus point after a 4-2 penalty shootout win. The second game in the group finished in a 2–0 defeat to Queen of the South at Palmerston Park. A second defeat followed, 4–3 against Airdrieonians, in a game where Sons were 3–1 up after an hour. Finlay Gray opened the scoring, with Jinky Hilton netting a double. On 25 July Swedish striker Joel Mumbongo became the Sons' sixth new signing of the summer, joining on a season long deal having left Hamilton Academical. He made his debut on 27 July as the Sons' League Cup campaign ended with a 6–0 defeat to Aberdeen - with the Dons scoring all six goals in the second-half.

=== August ===
The first league game of the new season ended in a 1–1 draw with newly relegated Inverness Caledonian Thistle in the Highlands, with Carlo Pignatiello on target and Mouhamed Niang sent-off for two bookings. For the second season in a row Sons started with two draws, with the first home game of the campaign ending 3–3 with Alloa Athletic. Michael Ruth netted a double, with Jinky Hilton also on target. Whilst ex-Sons Kevin Cawley and Scott Taggart both scored for the Wasps. A first win of the competitive season arrived in the Scottish Challenge Cup, 4–0 against Berwick Rangers with Craig McGuffie scoring a brace. Youth graduates Panos Grivas and Jacob Shields both made their senior debuts in the match. A third straight draw in the league followed on 17 August, with Mark Durnan scoring his first goal for the club in injury time to draw with Cove Rangers. A fourth draw came the next week, as Sons struck twice in the final 17 minutes - and missed a penalty - in a 2–2 tie with Arbroath. Michael Ruth and Matthew Shiels got the goals. The month ended with another comeback 2–2 draw, with Mark Durnan netting twice in a tie with Kelty Hearts.

=== September ===
September began with a 1–0 defeat to Peterhead in the Scottish Challenge Cup. On 11 September defender Ethan Schilte-Brown joined on loan from Kilmarnock initially on a deal until January. A sixth straight draw in the league followed on 14 September, with Paul McGowan levelling in stoppage time for Annan Athletic. During the game 16-year-old goalkeeper Luke Smallwood made his debut for the club with Brett Long sent-off after 18 minutes. An appeal against the red card with successful with Long able to play the next game as Sons suffered their first defeat of the campaign, 1–0 to Montrose, in a match they dominated - with the away side's goal their only shot, on or off target, of the match. The month ended with a 2–0 defeat to Queen of the South at Palmerston Park - with skipper Mark Durnan sent off.

=== October ===
A third straight defeat followed against Stenhousemuir on 5 October, leaving the Sons winless after the third quarter. Carlo Pignatiello got the Sons' goal, with Cameron Clark becoming the fourth Dumbarton player sent-off during the season. The Sons finally secured their first win of the campaign on 19 October, defeating Arbroath 3–1 at Gayfield Park. Thomas O'Brien put the hosts in front, but that was cancelled out by strikes from Carlo Pignatiello, Ethan Brown and Finlay Gray. Three days later the Sons moved off the foot of the table after Inverness Caledonian Thistle were deducted 15 points after entering administration, leaving them 12 points adrift of Dumbarton in League One. Sons extended that gap to 15 points with victory at home to The Caley Jags on 26 October, thanks to a double from Jinky Hilton and first of the season for Ryan Blair.

=== November ===
The first game of November ended in a 3–0 defeat to Cove Rangers at the Dumbarton Football Stadium. Sons dominated the first-half, but couldn't find the net, with the away side taking the lead early in the second period through a Mark Durnan own goal - which was added to by strikes from Mitch Megginson and Adam Emslie. Another defeat without scoring followed, this time 2–0 against Kelty Hearts. The Sons returned to winning ways on 16 November, with a 2-1 success against Queen of the South. Michael Ruth ended a 10-game goal drought with the opener, and Tony Wallace won the game with a stoppage time penalty.

On 19 November, the club entered administration and received a 15-point deduction, placing them last in the table. Two days later, Police Scotland said that they were investigating suspected fraud at the club. A fundraiser launched by the Sons Supporters Trust raised more than £75,000 towards wages and running costs within just a few days. On 23 November the club's planned game with Alloa Athletic fell victim to the weather. The club's first game since entering administration came against the Wasps in the Scottish Cup on 29 November, with the Sons running out 3–2 winners. Mouhamed Niang got his first Dumbarton goal, with Jinky Hilton and Michael Ruth also on target.

=== December ===
An away game with Alloa Athletic opened December, with Tony Wallace marking his 100th appearance by scoring a double in 2–2 draw - ensuring Sons put their first points on the board since entering administration. A 4–0 defeat followed against Stenhousemuir in a game the Sons finished with nine men and conceded two penalties, with both Finlay Gray and Brett Long sent-off. Gray later saw his red card downgraded to a yellow, however an appeal against the Long decision was rejected. After a 5–1 home defeat against Annan Athletic on 14 December, Sons returned to winning ways with a 2–1 away success against Montrose. Finlay Gray got both goals. A second straight win followed, this time 2–0 against Kelty Hearts at home - with Kalvin Orsi scoring both goals, his first league goals at home for Dumbarton - three-and-a-half years after signing for the club.

=== January ===
January opened with a 2–0 defeat to Inverness Caledonian Thistle in which Brett Long picked up a serious achilies injury that ended his season. Defender Ethan Brown also returned to parent club Kilmarnock after the match. Only able to sign players under the age of 20, Sons brought in Falkirk goalkeeper Owen Hayward on loan until the end of the season. Both debuted in a 5-1 Scottish Cup defeat to Airdrieonians. A week later came a 3–1 loss to Queen of the South on league duty, with Mark Durnan scoring Sons' goal.

=== February ===
A first league point of 2025 arrived in a 1–1 draw with Alloa Athletic on 1 February, with Jinky Hilton getting Sons' goal. Goalkeeper Milosz Sliwinski joined the club on loan from Queen's Park on 7 February with Owen Hayward ruled out for the remainder of the season and returning to Falkirk. He made his debut at 17-years-old in a 2–1 defeat to Annan Athletic a day later, with Joel Mumbongo scoring his first Dumbarton goal in his 25th match. The winless run continued against Montrose on 15 February - with Sons suffering a 3–2 defeat where Michael Ruth and Carlo Pignatiello found the net, and the month ended with another defeat - 2–1 to Cove Rangers - with Carlo Pignatiello on target. Prior to the game Sons signed goalkeeper Shay Kelly on loan from St Mirren with Patrick O'Neil ruled out for the remainder of the season with a broken finger.

=== March ===
The winless run continued into March with Corey O'Donnell netting a first-half hat-trick for Stenhousemuir in a 3–1 win for the Warriors. Carlo Pignatiello netted his third goal in as many games for Dumbarton. A terrific Michael Ruth free-kick then wasn't enough for anything against table topping Arbroath four days later. A sixth straight defeat then came against Inverness Caledonian Thistle with Alfie Bavidge scoring the winner with the final touch of the game. That run ended with Michael Ruth scoring a late leveller in a 1–1 draw away to league leaders Arbroath and another draw followed, 0–0 at home to Queen of the South. A first win of 2025 then arrived on March 29 at Recreation Park - with skipper Mark Durnan scoring an injury time header. Michael Ruth and Craig McGuffie were also on target, with goalkeeper Shay Kelly making his debut.

=== April ===
April opened with a second straight win, 6–0 against Kelty Hearts - Sons' biggest away victory for 14 years. Six different players got on the scoresheet. A first defeat in four came against Cove Rangers on April 12, 3–1 at home. On April 15 administrators Quantuma announced that a deal was being worked on that would see the club taken over by the Pendragon Group, with all debts cleared and creditors paid in full. Four days later the Sons drew 2–2 with Montrose - Carlo Pignatiello and Tony Wallace got the goals, with Shay Kelly saving two penalties. Kelly saved another penalty a week later, as Sons defeated Annan Athletic 3–1 to record their first home win of 2025. Ryan Blair, Tony Wallace and Jinky Hilton got the goals.

Off the park, a proposed takeover from the Pendragon Group fell through after the major shareholder in the firm, Gareth Phillips, fell ill on April 28.

=== May ===
The season ended with a 2–1 defeat to Stenhousemuir, Matthew Shiels got Sons' goal.

== First team transfers ==
- From end of 2024–25 season, to last match of season 2024–25

=== In ===
Player	From	League	Fee
Matthew Shiels	Cove Rangers	Scottish League One	Free
Cameron Clark	Stirling Albion	Scottish League One	Free
Michael Miller	Broomhill	Lowland Football League	Free
Craig McGuffie	Queen of the South	Scottish League One	Free
Mouhamed Niang	Cove Rangers	Scottish League One	Free
Joel Mumbongo	Hamilton Academical	Scottish Championship	Free
Ethan Schilte-Brown	Kilmarnock	Scottish Premiership	Loan
Owen Hayward	Falkirk	Scottish Championship	Loan
Kristian Webster	Rangers	Scottish Premiership	Loan
Milosz Sliwinski	Queen's Park	Scottish Championship	Loan
Shay Kelly	St Mirren	Scottish Premiership	Loan

=== Out ===
Player	To	League	Fee
Marc Kelly	St Cadoc's	West of Scotland Football League	Free
Harry Broun	Stranraer	Scottish League Two	Free
Luca Vata	Civil Service Strollers	Lowland Football League	Free
Blair Malcolm	Forfar Athletic	Scottish League Two	Free
Callum Wilson	Cumbernauld Colts	Lowland Football League	Free
Ross MacLean	Forfar Athletic	Scottish League Two	Undisclosed
Sean Crighton	Retired	N/A	N/A

== Fixtures and results ==
Win Draw Loss Upcoming fixture

=== Friendlies ===
29 June 2024	Dumbarton	2–3	Falkirk	Dumbarton Football Stadium
14:00	Jinky Hilton 5' 9'	Report	Calvin Miller 36', Aidan Nesbitt 66', Jordan Allan 70'	Attendance: 532

2 July 2024	Glenafton Athletic	0–4	Dumbarton	Loch Park
19:45			Trialist 22', Carlo Pignatiello 29' 36', Jinky Hilton 38'	Attendance: 200

6 July 2024	Hebburn Town	1–6	Dumbarton	Hebburn Sports & Social Ground
15:00	Amar Purewal 42'		Carlo Pignatiello 25', Trialist 31', David Wilson 61', Michael Ruth 65' 84', Finlay Gray 86'

=== Scottish League One ===
3 August 2024 1	Inverness Caledonian Thistle	1–1	Dumbarton	Caledonian Stadium
15:00	Danny Devine 44'	Report	Carlo Pignatiello 59' Mouhamed Niang (yellow card) 55' (yellow-red card) 80'	Attendance: 1,439; Referee: Dan McFarlane

10 August 2024 2	Dumbarton	3–3	Alloa Athletic	Dumbarton Football Stadium
15:00	Michael Ruth 5' 76', Jinky Hilton 65'	Report	Luke Donnelly 10', Kevin Cawley 27', Scott Taggart 84'	Attendance: 505; Referee: Ross Hardie

17 August 2024 3	Cove Rangers	1–1	Dumbarton	Balmoral Stadium
15:00	Adam Emslie 64'	Report	Mark Durnan 90+1'	Referee: Colin Whyte

24 August 2024 4	Dumbarton	2–2	Arbroath	Dumbarton Football Stadium
15:00	Michael Ruth 74', Matthew Shiels 79'	Report	Scott Stewart 5', Ryan Dow 50'	Attendance: 688; Referee: Greg Soutar; Man of the Match: Matthew Shiels

31 August 2024 5	Dumbarton	2–2	Kelty Hearts	Dumbarton Football Stadium
15:00	Mark Durnan 43' 89'	Report	Luke McCarvel 10', Craig Johnston 59'	Attendance: 471; Referee: Dan McFarlane; Man of the Match: Mark Durnan

14 September 2024 6	Annan Athletic	1–1	Dumbarton	Galabank Stadium
15:00	Jinky Hilton 9', Brett Long (red card) 18'	Report	Paul McGowan 90+2'	Attendance: 375; Referee: Sean Murdoch

21 September 2024 7	Dumbarton	0–1	Montrose	Dumbarton Football Stadium
15:00		Report	Kane Hester 6'	Attendance: 626; Referee: Graham Grainger

28 September 2024 8	Queen of the South	2–0	Dumbarton	Palmerston Park
15:00	Lewis O'Donnell 14', Mikey Hewitt 50'	Report	Mark Durnan (red card) 70'	Referee: Gary Hanvidge

5 October 2024 9	Dumbarton	1–3	Stenhousemuir	Dumbarton Football Stadium
15:00	Carlo Pignatiello 42' Cammy Clark (yellow card) 70' (yellow-red card)	Report	Blair Alston 11' (pen.), Matthew Aitken 35' 80'	Attendance: 620; Referee: Steven Maclean

19 October 2024 10	Arbroath	1–3	Dumbarton	Gayfield Park
15:00	Thomas O'Brien 11'	Report	Carlo Pignatiello 19', Ethan Brown 47', Finlay Gray 90'	Attendance: 1,159; Referee: Greg Soutar

26 October 2024 11	Dumbarton	3–1	Inverness Caledonian Thistle	Dumbarton Football Stadium
15:00	Jinky Hilton 14' 72', Ryan Blair 63'	Report	Jake Davidson 28'	Attendance: 872; Referee: Graham Grainger; Man of the Match: Jinky Hilton

2 November 2024 12	Dumbarton	0–3	Cove Rangers	Dumbarton Football Stadium
15:00		Report	OG 50', Mitch Megginson 55', Adam Emslie 89'	Attendance: 568; Referee: George Calder

9 November 2024 13	Kelty Hearts	2–0	Dumbarton	New Central Park
15:00	Ross Cunningham 51', Scott Williamson 65'	Report		Attendance: 507; Referee: Alex Shepherd

16 November 2024 14	Dumbarton	2–1	Queen of the South	Dumbarton Football Stadium
15:00	Michael Ruth 73', Tony Wallace 90+5' (pen.)	Report	Kyle Doherty 83'	Attendance: 708; Referee: Steven Kirkland

3 December 2024 15	Alloa Athletic	2–2	Dumbarton	Recreation Park, Alloa
19:45	Luke Donnelly 3', Calum Waters 76'	Report	Tony Wallace 15' 58' (pen.)	Attendance: 426; Referee: Alastair Grieve

7 December 2024 16	Stenhousemuir	4–0	Dumbarton	Ochilview Park
15:00	Matty Yates (8.) 70' (pen.) 88' (pen.), Aaron Steele 25'	Report	Finlay Gray (red card) 44', Brett Long (red card) 70'	Attendance: 436; Referee: Craig Napier

14 December 2024 17	Dumbarton	1–5	Annan Athletic	Dumbarton Football Stadium
15:00	Mouhamed Niang 45+1'	Report	Paul Smith 31', Willie Gibson 35' (pen.), Rhys Breen 51', Aidan Smith 66', Tommy Muir 76'	Attendance: 506; Referee: Dan McFarlane

21 December 2024 18	Montrose	1–2	Dumbarton	Links Park
15:00	Blair McKenzie 81', Aidan Quinn (yellow card) 83' (yellow-red card) 90+3'	Report	Finlay Gray 25' 76'	Attendance: 541; Referee: Steven Kirkland

28 December 2024 19	Dumbarton	2–0	Kelty Hearts	Dumbarton Football Stadium
15:00	Kalvin Orsi 70' 89'	Report	Scott Allan (red card) 68'	Attendance: 695; Referee: Chris Graham

4 January 2025 20	Inverness Caledonian Thistle	2–0	Dumbarton	Dumbarton Football Stadium
15:00	Alfie Bavidge 15' Charlie Gilmour 68'	Report		Attendance: 1894; Referee: Dan McFarlane

25 January 2025 21	Queen of the South	3 – 1	Dumbarton	Palmerston Park
15:00	Adam Brooks 3' 54', Brennan Dickenson 66'	Report	Mark Durnan 28'	Attendance: 1,027; Referee: Lloyd Wilson

1 February 2025 22	Dumbarton	1–1	Alloa Athletic	Dumbarton Football Stadium
15:00	Jinky Hilton 2'	Report	Josh Gentles 50'	Attendance: 582; Referee: Duncan Williams

8 February 2025 23	Annan Athletic	2-1	Dumbarton	Galabank Stadium
15:00	Paul Smith 48', Willie Gibson 77' (pen.)	Report	Joel Mumbongo 64'	Attendance: 428; Referee: Peter Stuart

15 February 2025 24	Dumbarton	2-3	Montrose	Dumbarton Football Stadium
15:00	Michael Ruth 19' (pen.), Carlo Pignatiello 37'	Report	Owen Stirton 13' (pen.) 24', Aidan Quinn 68'	Attendance: 533; Referee: Daniel Graves

22 February 2025 25	Cove Rangers	2-1	Dumbarton	Balmoral Stadium
15:00	Mitch Megginson 44' (pen.) Fraser Fyvie 87'	Report	Carlo Pignatiello 5'	Attendance: 353; Referee: Steven Kirkland

1 March 2025 26	Dumbarton	1-3	Stenhousemuir	Dumbarton Football Stadium
15:00	Carlo Pignatiello 55'	Report	Corey O'Donnell 22' 31' 40'	Attendance: 540; Referee: Greg Soutar

4 March 2025 27	Dumbarton	1-2	Arbroath	Dumbarton Football Stadium
19:45	Michael Ruth 4'	Report	Andy Winter 15', Ryan Dow 47'	Attendance: 355; Referee: Ryan Lee

8 March 2025 28	Dumbarton	0-1	Inverness Caledonian Thistle	Dumbarton Football Stadium
15:00		Report	Alfie Bavidge 90+3'	Attendance: 757; Referee: Steven Kirkland

15 March 2025 29	Arbroath	1-1	Dumbarton	Gayfield Park
15:00	Sam Stanton 11'	Report	Michael Ruth 86'	Attendance: 1,434; Referee: Alastair Grieve

21 March 2025 30	Dumbarton	0-0	Queen of the South	Dumbarton Football Stadium
15:00		Report		Attendance: 688; Referee: Colin Whyte

28 March 2025 31	Alloa Athletic	2-3	Dumbarton	Recreation Park, Alloa
15:00	Luke Donnelly 22', Conor Sammon 86'	Report	Michael Ruth 69' (pen.), Craig McGuffie 79', Mark Durnan 90+2'	Attendance: 594; Referee: Joel Kennedy

5 April 2025 32	Kelty Hearts	0-6	Dumbarton	New Central Park
15:00	Ross Cunningham (yellow card) 35' (yellow-red card) 70'	Report	Joel Mumbongo 18', Kalvin Orsi 25', Carlo Pignatiello 34', Michael Ruth 50', Matthew Shiels 77', Craig McGuffie 80'	Attendance: 317; Referee: Iain Sneddon

12 April 2025 33	Dumbarton	1-3	Cove Rangers	Dumbarton Football Stadium
15:00	Kristian Webster 49'	Report	Dylan Lobban 28' 81', Fraser Fyvie 34'	Attendance: 531; Referee: Graham Grainger

19 April 2025 34	Montrose	2-2	Dumbarton	Links Park
15:00	Owen Stirton 21', Aidan Quinn 84'	Report	Carlo Pignatiello 43', Tony Wallace 63' (pen.)	Attendance: 1,087; Referee: Iain Sneddon

26 April 2025 35	Dumbarton	3-1	Annan Athletic	Dumbarton Football Stadium
15:00	Ryan Blair 35', Tony Wallace 77', Jinky Hilton 79'	Report	Scott Hooper (yellow card) 35' (yellow-red card) 49', Tommy Goss 60'	Attendance: 581; Referee: Duncan Williams

3 May 2025 36	Stenhousemuir	2-1	Dumbarton	Ochilview Park
15:00	Matty Aitken 9', Blair Alston 60', Kinlay Bilham (red card) 85'	Report	Matthew Shiels 53'	Attendance: 764; Referee: Dan McFarlane

=== Scottish Cup ===
29 November 2024 Third round	Dumbarton	3–2	Alloa Athletic	Dumbarton Football Stadium
19:45	Mouhamed Niang 11', Jinky Hilton 13', Michael Ruth 39'	Report	Luke Donnelly 43', Stefan Scougall 65'	Attendance: 724; Referee: Ryan Lee

18 January 2025 Fourth round	Dumbarton	1–5	Airdrieonians	Dumbarton Football Stadium
15:00	Craig McGuffie 90+1'	Report	Lewis McGrattan 4', Gavin Gallagher 9', Chris Mochrie 74', Ben Wilson 78', Craig Watson 86'	Attendance: 1,113; Referee: Colin Steven

=== Scottish League Cup ===
Pos	Team	Pld	W	PW	PL	L	GF	GA	GD	Pts	Qualification	ABE	AIR	QOS	EKB	DUM
1	Aberdeen	4	4	0	0	0	15	1	+14	12	Qualification for the second round	—	2–1	—	—	6–0
2	Airdrieonians	4	3	0	0	1	15	5	+10	9	Qualification for the second round	—	—	2–0	8–0	—
3	Queen of the South	4	2	0	0	2	5	6	−1	6		0–3	—	—	—	2–0
4	East Kilbride	4	0	1	0	3	2	16	−14	2		0–4	—	1–3	—	—
5	Dumbarton	4	0	0	1	3	4	13	−9	1		—	3–4	—	1–1p	—

Rules for classification: 1) goal difference, 2) goals scored, 3) away goals scored, 4) matches won, 5) away matches won, 6) drawing of lots.

==== Matches ====
13 July 2024 Group stage	Dumbarton	1–1 (2–4 p)	East Kilbride	Dumbarton Football Stadium
15:00	Kalvin Orsi 16'	Report	OG 7'	Attendance: 370; Referee: Joel Kennedy

16 July 2024 Group stage	Queen of the South	2–0	Dumbarton	Palmerston Park
19:45	Leighton McIntosh 7', Kieran McKechnie 57'	Report		Referee: Stuart Luke

20 July 2024 Group stage	Dumbarton	3–4	Airdrieonians	Dumbarton Football Stadium
15:00	Finlay Gray 27', Jinky Hilton 47' 51' (pen.)	Report	Lewis McGrattan 33', Rhys Armstrong 67', Terrell Agyemang 85', Ben Wilson 88'	Attendance: 659; Referee: Lloyd Wilson

27 July 2024 Group stage	Aberdeen	6–0	Dumbarton	Pittodrie Stadium
15:00	Jack MacKenzie 46'; Ester Sokler 48', 61'; Peter Ambrose 84'; James McGarry 86'; Slobodan Rubežić 90+2'	Report		Attendance: 8,450; Referee: Craig Napier

=== Scottish Challenge Cup ===
13 August 2024 Second round	Dumbarton	4–0	Berwick Rangers	Dumbarton Football Stadium
20:00	Craig McGuffie 7' 31', Michael Ruth 23', David Wilson 37'	Report		Attendance: 240; Referee: Gary Hanvidge

7 September 2024 Third round	Peterhead	1–0	Dumbarton	Balmoor Stadium
15:00	Max Barry 66'	Report		Attendance: 586; Referee: Stewart Luke

== Player statistics ==
As of 15:57, 3 May 2025 (UTC)

=== All competitions ===
#	Position	Player	Starts	Subs	Unused subs	Goals	Red cards (red card)	Yellow cards (yellow card)
6	MF	(Scotland) Ryan Blair	23	8	12	2	0	3
4	DF	(Canada) Ethan Schilte-Brown	15	0	1	1	0	1
24	DF	(Scotland) Cammy Clark	29	4	8	0	1	7
14	DF	(Scotland) Owen Doyle	0	0	3	0	0	0
5	DF	(Scotland) Mark Durnan	35	1	1	5	1	9
1	GK	(Scotland) Owen Hayward	1	0	0	0	0	0
17	MF	(Scotland) James Hilton	27	9	3	9	0	3
26	MF	(Scotland) Aedan Gilfedder	0	2	12	0	0	0
10	MF	(Scotland) Finlay Gray	32	11	1	4	1	5
15	FW	(Greece) Panagiotis Grivas	0	1	13	0	0	0
28	GK	(Scotland) Shay Kelly	5	0	7	0	0	2
1	GK	(Northern Ireland) Brett Long	22	0	3	0	2	0
2	DF	(Scotland) Aron Lynas	15	6	23	0	0	3
21	MF	(Scotland) Craig McGuffie	28	13	3	5	0	1
31	MF	(Scotland) Michael Miller	26	1	10	0	0	6
9	FW	(Sweden) Joel Mumbongo	6	30	1	2	0	5
20	MF	(Senegal) Mouhamed Niang	38	3	1	2	1	10
16	MF	(Scotland) Murray Nicol	0	1	3	0	0	0
19	GK	(Scotland) Paddy O'Neil	7	3	20	0	0	0
7	MF	(Scotland) Kalvin Orsi	27	13	3	4	0	3
12	DF	(Scotland) Carlo Pignatiello	36	3	1	8	0	3
16	MF	(Scotland) Zak Queen	0	1	1	0	0	0
23	FW	(Scotland) Michael Ruth	29	8	0	11	0	4
14	FW	(Scotland) Jacob Shields	0	2	12	0	0	0
1	GK	(Poland) Milosz Sliwinski	9	0	2	0	0	0
13	GK	(Scotland) Luke Smallwood	0	1	8	0	0	0
22	DF	(Scotland) Matthew Shiels	25	5	1	3	0	5
11	MF	(Scotland) Tony Wallace	14	21	5	5	0	7
18	DF	(Scotland) Kristian Webster	15	1	1	1	0	1
8	MF	(Scotland) David Wilson	15	12	10	1	0	1
3	DF	(Scotland) Greig Young	7	2	35	0	0	2

=== Captains ===
No.	P	Name	Country	No. games	Notes
5	DF	Mark Durnan	(Scotland)	34	Club captain
11	MF	Tony Wallace	(Scotland)	3	Vice-captain
31	DF	Michael Miller	(Scotland)	2	Games versus East Kilbride and Stenhousemuir when Mark Durnan was unavailable and Tony Wallace was a substitute.
2	DF	Aron Lynas	(Scotland)	1	Game versus Stenhousemuir on 5 October when Mark Durnan was suspended and Tony Wallace was injured.
24	DF	Cammy Clark	(Scotland)	2	Game versus Kelty Hearts where Durnan was injured and Wallace on the bench.
6	DF	Ryan Blair	(Scotland)	1	Game versus Annan Athletic where Durnan and Clark were injured and Wallace on the bench.

Last updated: As of match played 23:53, 3 May 2025 (UTC)
Source: Competitive match reports.
Competitive matches only
Matches started as captain only
Country: FIFA nationality; No.: Squad number; P: Position; Name: Player name; No. Games: Number of games started as captain.

== League table ==
Pos	Team	Pld	W	D	L	GF	GA	GD	Pts	Promotion, qualification or relegation
6	Kelty Hearts	36	11	11	14	40	46	−6	44	
7	Inverness Caledonian Thistle	36	16	10	10	45	38	+7	43 (Note: Inverness Caledonian Thistle were deducted 15 points for entering administration.)	
8	Montrose	36	9	13	14	40	49	−9	40	
9	Annan Athletic (R)	36	10	6	20	41	68	−27	36	Qualification for the League One play-offs
10	Dumbarton (R)	36	8	11	17	51	66	−15	20 (Note: Dumbarton were deducted 15 points for entering administration.)	Relegation to League Two

Rules for classification: 1) Points; 2) Goal difference; 3) Goals scored; 4) Head-to-to head points; 5) Head-to-head goal difference; 6) Play-off (only for deciding promotion, play-off participation and relegation).
(R) Relegated
