= 2021–22 Scottish League Two =

Scottish League Two
- Season: 2021–22
- Dates: 31 July 2021 – 30 April 2022
- Champions: Kelty Hearts
- Promoted: Kelty Hearts (as champions); Edinburgh City (via play-offs)
- Relegated: Cowdenbeath
- Matches: 180
- Goals: 468 (2.6 per match)
- Top goalscorer: Nathan Austin; 17 goals
- Biggest home win: Kelty Hearts 6–1 Albion Rovers (11 December 2021); Stirling Albion 5–0 Edinburgh City (30 April 2022)
- Biggest away win: Albion Rovers 0–5 Stranraer (9 April 2022)
- Highest scoring: Kelty Hearts 6–1 Albion Rovers (11 December 2021); Forfar Athletic 3–4 Stenhousemuir (26 December 2021)
- Longest winning run: Kelty Hearts; 5 games
- Longest unbeaten run: Kelty Hearts; 16 games
- Longest winless run: Cowdenbeath; 12 games
- Longest losing run: Stirling Albion; 7 games
- Highest attendance: 1,202; Kelty Hearts 2–0 Cowdenbeath (31 July 2021)
- Lowest attendance: 151; Albion Rovers 1–4 Annan Athletic (2 March 2022)
- All statistics correct as of 30 April 2022.

The 2021–22 Scottish League Two (known as cinch League Two for sponsorship reasons) was the ninth season of Scottish League Two, the fourth tier of Scottish football. The season began on 31 July.

Ten teams contested the league: Albion Rovers, Annan Athletic, Cowdenbeath, Edinburgh City, Elgin City, Forfar Athletic, Kelty Hearts, Stenhousemuir, Stirling Albion and Stranraer.

== Teams ==
The following teams changed division after the 2020–21 season.

=== To League Two ===
Promoted from Lowland Football League

- Kelty Hearts

Relegated from League One

- Forfar Athletic

=== From League Two ===
Relegated to Highland Football League

- Brechin City

Promoted to League One

- Queen's Park

=== Stadia and locations ===
Albion Rovers	Annan Athletic	Cowdenbeath	Edinburgh City
Cliftonhill	Galabank	Central Park	Ainslie Park
Capacity: 1,238	Capacity: 2,504	Capacity: 4,309	Capacity: 3,534
Elgin City	Location of teams in 2021–22 Scottish League Two		Forfar Athletic
Borough Briggs	Location of teams in 2021–22 Scottish League Two		Station Park
Capacity: 4,520	Location of teams in 2021–22 Scottish League Two		Capacity: 6,777
Kelty Hearts	Stenhousemuir	Stirling Albion	Stranraer
New Central Park	Ochilview Park	Forthbank Stadium	Stair Park
Capacity: 2,181	Capacity: 3,746	Capacity: 3,808	Capacity: 4,178

=== Personnel and kits ===
Team	Manager	Captain	Kit manufacturer	Shirt sponsor
Albion Rovers	(Scotland) Brian Reid	(Scotland) Aron Lynas	Joma	CompliancePath
Annan Athletic	(Republic of Ireland) Peter Murphy	(England) Steven Swinglehurst	EV2 Sportswear	M & S Engineering
Cowdenbeath	(Scotland) Maurice Ross	(Scotland) Craig Barr	Erreà	Collier Haulage, Quarrying and Recycling
Edinburgh City	(Republic of Ireland) Alan Maybury (interim)	(Scotland) Robbie McIntyre	Macron	Forth Capital
Elgin City	(Scotland) Gavin Price	(Scotland) Euan Spark	Joma	McDonald & Munro
Forfar Athletic	(Scotland) Gary Irvine	(Scotland) Ross Meechan	Pendle	Orchard Timber Products
Kelty Hearts	(Scotland) Kevin Thomson	(Scotland) Michael Tidser	Joma	The Conservatory Converters
Stenhousemuir	(Scotland) Stephen Swift	(Scotland) Sean Crighton	Puma	LOC Hire
Stirling Albion	(Scotland) Darren Young	(Scotland) Ross McGeachie	Macron	Prudential
Stranraer	(Scotland) Jamie Hamill	(Scotland) Grant Gallagher	Joma	Stena Line

=== Managerial changes ===
Team	Outgoing manager	Manner of departure	Date of vacancy	Position in table	Incoming manager	Date of appointment
Kelty Hearts	(Scotland) Barry Ferguson	Resigned	24 May 2021	Pre-season	(Scotland) Kevin Thomson	28 May 2021
Stranraer	(Scotland) Stephen Farrell	Signed by Dumbarton	29 May 2021	Pre-season	(Scotland) Jamie Hamill	4 June 2021
Cowdenbeath	(Scotland) Gary Bollan	Mutual consent	23 October 2021	10th	(Scotland) Maurice Ross	2 November 2021
Stirling Albion	(Scotland) Kevin Rutkiewicz	Resigned	9 December 2021	4th	(Scotland) Darren Young	20 December 2021
Edinburgh City	(Scotland) Gary Naysmith	Sacked	17 March 2022	4th	(Republic of Ireland) Alan Maybury (interim)	24 March 2022

== League summary ==
=== League table ===
Pos	Team	Pld	W	D	L	GF	GA	GD	Pts	Promotion, qualification or relegation
1	Kelty Hearts (C, P)	36	24	9	3	68	28	+40	81	Promotion to League One
2	Forfar Athletic	36	16	12	8	57	36	+21	60	Qualification for the League One play-offs
3	Annan Athletic	36	18	5	13	64	51	+13	59	Qualification for the League One play-offs
4	Edinburgh City (O, P)	36	14	10	12	43	49	−6	52	Qualification for the League One play-offs
5	Stenhousemuir	36	13	10	13	47	46	+1	49	
6	Stranraer	36	13	8	15	50	54	−4	47	
7	Stirling Albion	36	11	9	16	41	46	−5	42	
8	Albion Rovers	36	10	9	17	37	58	−21	39	
9	Elgin City	36	9	10	17	33	51	−18	37	
10	Cowdenbeath (R)	36	7	8	21	28	49	−21	29	Qualification for the League Two play-off final

Rules for classification: 1) Points; 2) Goal difference; 3) Goals scored; 4) Head-to-to head points; 5) Head-to-head goal difference; 6) Play-off (only for deciding promotion, play-off participation and relegation).
(C) Champions; (O) Play-off winners; (P) Promoted; (R) Relegated

== Results ==
=== Matches 1–18 ===
Teams play each other twice, once at home and once away.

Home \ Away	ALB	ANN	COW	EDI	ELG	FOR	KEL	STE	STI	STR
Albion Rovers	—	0–1	2–1	2–0	2–0	2–3	0–3	2–2	1–0	3–2
Annan Athletic	1–1	—	1–0	1–3	4–1	0–2	5–1	1–2	3–1	2–2
Cowdenbeath	0–0	1–3	—	1–2	3–1	1–1	0–1	0–2	1–0	1–2
Edinburgh City	0–4	0–1	1–1	—	2–0	0–4	2–3	1–0	2–2	3–1
Elgin City	3–0	0–2	1–0	1–1	—	1–1	2–0	2–2	0–2	1–1
Forfar Athletic	3–1	2–0	3–0	2–0	2–1	—	2–2	3–4	2–0	1–1
Kelty Hearts	6–1	2–1	2–0	1–0	1–1	1–0	—	2–0	1–1	1–0
Stenhousemuir	3–1	2–0	1–1	2–2	1–2	1–1	1–4	—	0–1	1–4
Stirling Albion	2–1	2–3	4–0	1–2	0–1	1–0	1–3	1–3	—	1–1
Stranraer	1–0	0–3	2–0	0–1	1–0	2–3	0–4	2–0	0–3	—

Legend: Blue = home team win; Yellow = draw; Red = away team win.
For upcoming matches, an "a" indicates there is an article about the rivalry between the two participants.

=== Matches 19–36 ===
Teams play each other twice, once at home and once away.

Home \ Away	ALB	ANN	COW	EDI	ELG	FOR	KEL	STE	STI	STR
Albion Rovers	—	1–4	0–1	0–1	0–0	0–0	0–0	1–2	1–1	0–5
Annan Athletic	2–4	—	2–3	2–1	2–1	2–2	1–2	0–2	0–0	4–1
Cowdenbeath	0–1	1–3	—	0–0	2–0	1–2	0–1	1–1	0–0	0–1
Edinburgh City	1–2	2–1	1–0	—	2–2	2–0	1–1	1–1	1–0	1–2
Elgin City	1–1	0–2	1–4	2–0	—	1–0	0–0	0–2	3–1	1–2
Forfar Athletic	2–0	5–1	1–1	2–3	0–0	—	1–0	0–0	0–1	3–2
Kelty Hearts	3–1	3–1	1–0	2–2	4–0	1–1	—	1–0	1–1	3–2
Stenhousemuir	4–1	0–1	0–2	0–0	2–1	2–0	0–1	—	1–2	1–3
Stirling Albion	0–1	0–3	2–1	5–0	0–2	1–1	0–3	0–1	—	1–0
Stranraer	0–0	1–1	3–0	0–2	2–0	0–2	0–3	1–1	3–3	—

Legend: Blue = home team win; Yellow = draw; Red = away team win.
For upcoming matches, an "a" indicates there is an article about the rivalry between the two participants.

== Season statistics ==
=== Scoring ===
==== Top scorers ====
As of 30 April 2022

Rank	Player	Club	Goals
1	(England) Nathan Austin	Kelty Hearts	17
2	(Scotland) Tony Wallace	Annan Athletic	13
2	(Scotland) Kane Hester	Elgin City	13
2	(Scotland) Thomas Orr	Stenhousemuir	13
5	(Scotland) Tommy Goss	Annan Athletic	12
5	(England) Joe Cardle	Kelty Hearts	12

== Awards ==
Month	Manager of the Month		Player of the Month	
Month	Manager	Club	Player	Club
August	(Scotland) Kevin Thomson	Kelty Hearts	(England) Joe Cardle	Kelty Hearts
September	(Scotland) Kevin Rutkiewicz	Stirling Albion	(England) Nathan Austin	Kelty Hearts
October	(Scotland) Gary Irvine	Forfar Athletic	(Scotland) Craig Thomson	Forfar Athletic
November	(Scotland) Kevin Thomson	Kelty Hearts	(Scotland) John Robertson	Edinburgh City
December	(Republic of Ireland) Peter Murphy	Annan Athletic	(Scotland) Dominic Docherty	Annan Athletic
January	(Scotland) Gavin Price	Elgin City	(Scotland) Tam Orr	Stenhousemuir
February	(Scotland) Stephen Swift	Stenhousemuir	(Scotland) Nicky Jamieson	Stenhousemuir
March	(Scotland) Kevin Thomson	Kelty Hearts	(Scotland) Tommy Goss	Annan Athletic
April	(Scotland) Gary Irvine	Forfar Athletic	(England) Kallum Higginbotham	Kelty Hearts

== League Two play-offs ==
The Pyramid play-off was contested between the champions of the 2021–22 Highland Football League (Fraserburgh) and the 2021–22 Lowland Football League (Bonnyrigg Rose Athletic). The winners (Bonnyrigg Rose Athletic) then faced the bottom club in League Two (Cowdenbeath) in the play-off final. As Bonnyrigg Rose Athletic won the final, they were promoted to League Two for the 2022–23 season and Cowdenbeath were relegated to the Lowland League.

=== Pyramid play-off ===
==== First leg ====
23 April 2022	Bonnyrigg Rose Athletic	3–1	Fraserburgh	Bonnyrigg
15:00	McGachie 38'; Connolly 54'; Currie 82'		Young 70'	Stadium: New Dundas Park; Attendance: 1,571; Referee: Alan Newlands

==== Second leg ====
30 April 2022	Fraserburgh	1–0 (2–3 agg.)	Bonnyrigg Rose Athletic	Fraserburgh
15:00	Simpson 65'			Stadium: Bellslea Park; Referee: Mike Roncone

=== Final ===
==== First leg ====
7 May 2022	Bonnyrigg Rose Athletic	3–0	Cowdenbeath	Bonnyrigg
15:00	S. Brown 40'; Martyniuk 44' (pen.); Brett 74'			Stadium: New Dundas Park; Attendance: 2,202; Referee: Grant Irvine

==== Second leg ====
14 May 2022	Cowdenbeath	0–1 (0–4 agg.)	Bonnyrigg Rose Athletic	Cowdenbeath
15:00			Martyniuk 62' (pen.)	Stadium: Central Park; Attendance: 2,117; Referee: David Munro
