= Ali Omar (footballer, born 1999) =

Somali footballer (born 1999)

Personal information
- Full name: Ali Mohammed Omar
- Date of birth: 14 September 1999 (age 27)
- Place of birth: London, England
- Position: Centre-back

Team information
- Current team: Dumbarton
- Number: 3

Youth career
- Stevenage

Senior career*
Years	Team	Apps	(Gls)
2018–2019	Queens Park Rangers	0	(0)
2019	→ Grantham Town (loan)	2	(0)
2019–2020	Tower Hamlets	10	(0)
2020–2021	Barnsley	0	(0)
2021–2023	Torquay United	51	(1)
2023–2025	Larne	1	(0)
2023–2024	→ Bangor (loan)	4	(0)
2025	Farnborough	7	(0)
2026–	Dumbarton	29	(2)

International career^{‡}
2025–	Somalia	12	(0)
- * Club domestic league appearances and goals as of 20:37, 7 November 2026 (UTC) ‡ National team caps and goals as of 19:09, 4 October 2026 (UTC)

Ali Mohammed Omar (born 14 September 1999) is a professional football player who plays as a centre-back for Dumbarton. Born in England, he plays for the Somalia national football team.

== Club Career ==
=== Early career ===
A youth product of Stevenage, Omar joined Queens Park Rangers on trial in the summer of 2018 before permanently joining the club on 6 August 2018. He appeared as an unused substitute in the first team, as Queens Park Rangers went on to lose 2–0 against Blackpool in the third round of the League Cup on 25 September 2018.

On 12 February 2019, Omar joined Grantham Town on loan until 31 March 2019. On the same day, he made his debut for the club, starting in a 2–1 win against South Shields. Omar made two more appearances before returning to his parent club. At the end of the 2018–19 season, he was released by Queens Park Rangers upon expiry of his contract. Omar transferred to the non-league side Tower Hamlets for the 2019–20 season, where he made ten appearances.

=== Barnsley ===
On 30 January 2020, Omar joined Barnsley until the end of the 2019–20 season with an option for a further year. He was assigned to their youth side. However, the season was soon curtailed because of the COVID-19 pandemic. On 22 May 2020, Omar signed a six-month contract extension with the club.

Ahead of the 2020–21 season, Omar was given a number forty–four shirt. He then captained the club’s under-23 side on several occasions during the season. Omar was then called up to Barnsley’s first team on four occasions, appearing as an unused substitute for the rest of the 2020–21 season. On 15 May 2021, he was released by the club.

=== Torquay United ===
On 19 July 2021, he transferred to the National League club Torquay United.

However, he suffered an injury during a 3–0 loss against Plymouth Argyle in a friendly match on 31 July 2021. But Omar quickly recovered and featured in a friendly match, in a 3–0 win against Chippenham Town. He made his debut for the club, starting the whole game, in a 3–1 loss against Altrincham in the opening game of the season. In a follow–up match against Notts County, however, Omar received a straight red card in the 24th minute for Kyle Wootton, in a 1–1 draw. After serving a one match suspension, he returned to the starting line–up, in a 4–3 win against Maidenhead United on 4 September 2021. However, poor results in the next two matches saw Omar dropped from the starting line–up. This resulted in him finding the majority of playing time coming from the bench. By late–April, he soon regained his first team place, playing in the centre–back position regularly towards the end of the 2021–22 season. At the end of the 2021–22 season, Omar made twenty–four appearances in all competitions. Following this, he signed a contract extension with Torquay United for another season.

In the opening game of the 2022–23 season, Omar started the whole game at centre–back in a 0–0 draw against Oldham Athletic. However, during the match, he suffered a concussion that resulted in his substitution and was taken to hospital, causing him to miss one match. On 16 August 2022, Omar returned to the starting line–up and played the whole game, in a 1–0 loss against Bromley. Following his return, he regained his first team place, against playing in the centre–back position. On 17 September 2022, Omar scored his first goal for Torquay United, in a 1–1 draw against Wealdstone. By late–October, he was dropped to the bench. On 1 November 2022, Omar was at fault when his mistake led to Tommy Willard scoring, as the club won 6–1 against Aldershot Town. However in late–January, Omar spent a month without playing football due to facing competitions from other defenders. On 7 March 2023, he returned to the first team, coming on as a second-half substitute, in a 3–2 loss against Solihull Moors. Omar made five more appearances for Torquay United later in the 2022–23 season. On the last game of the season, the club was relegated back to the National League South following a 1–1 draw against Wrexham. At the end of the 2022–23 season, he made twenty–seven appearances scoring once in all competitions.

On 3 May 2023, Omar was released by Torquay United, ending his two-year association with the club.

=== Larne ===
On 20 June 2023, Omar moved to Northern Ireland to join NIFL Premiership club Larne.

He made his debut for the club, starting the whole game, in a 2–0 loss against Crusaders in the NIFL Charity Shield. Omar made his European debut in the UEFA Europa Conference League against FC Ballkani, as Larne went on to lose 4–1. He made his league debut for the club, coming on as a 50th-minute substitute, in a 0–0 draw against Coleraine. Having gone a year without football, Omar was released by Larne at the end of the 2024–25 season.

==== Loan spells at Bangor ====
On 1 September 2023, Omar joined Bangor on loan until January 2024.

On 15 October 2023, he made his league debut for the club, coming on as a 54th-minute substitute, in a 5–1 win against Knockbreda. In his fourth appearance for Larne against Harland & Wolff Welders on 4 November 2023, Omar tore his ACL and was substituted in the 11th minute, as the match ended in a 1–1 draw. Having made four appearances for the club, he returned to his parent club on 4 January 2024.

=== Farnborough ===
On 25 July 2025, Omar returned to England, joining National League South side Farnborough.

On 20 August 2025, he made his debut for the club, coming on as a 70th-minute substitute, in a 1–0 win against Worthing. Omar went on to make ten appearances for Farnborough before departing the club.

=== Dumbarton ===
After leaving Farnborough, Omar joined Scottish League Two side Dumbarton on 24 January 2026.

He made his debut for the club, starting the whole game, in a 2–2 draw against Elgin City on the same day. Since joining Dumbarton, Omar has become a regular, playing in the centre–back position. On 21 February 2026, Omar scored his first goal for the club, in a 3-1 defeat against East Kilbride. After missing one match due to an international call-up, he returned to the starting line–up, in a 1–1 draw against Stranraer on 4 April 2026. Omar was later named Dumbarton’s Player of the Month for March. At the end of the 2025–26 season, he made sixteen appearances and scored once in all competitions. Following this, Omar was offered a new contract by the club and extended his time at Dumbarton for a further season on May 22 2026. He scored a memorable 60-yard winner for the club against Elgin City in September 2026.

== International career ==
Born in England, Omar is of Somali descent. He was called up to the Somalia national football team for a set of 2026 FIFA World Cup qualification matches in March 2025. Omar made his debut for the national team, starting the whole game, in a 0–0 draw against Guinea on 21 March 2025.

He played in both legs as the side made it to Africa Cup of Nations qualifying for the first time, with a penalty shootout victory against Mauritius national football team in March 2026.

== Honours ==
Larne

- NIFL Premiership: 2023–24
- County Antrim Shield: 2023–24
