= Ryan Blair (footballer) =

Scottish footballer (born 1996)

Personal information
- Full name: Ryan Dominic Blair
- Date of birth: 23 February 1996 (age 30)
- Place of birth: Glasgow, Scotland
- Position: Midfielder

Team information
- Current team: Brechin City

Youth career
- –2014: Falkirk

Senior career*
Years	Team	Apps	(Gls)
2014–2016	Falkirk	7	(0)
2016–2019	Swansea City	0	(0)
2018	→ Falkirk (loan)	7	(1)
2019	→ Dunfermline Athletic (loan)	13	(1)
2019–2021	Stenhousemuir	35	(1)
2021	East Kilbride	12	(4)
2022	East Fife	17	(0)
2022–2026	Dumbarton	107	(7)
2026–	Brechin City	0	(0)
- * Club domestic league appearances and goals as of 19:31, 28 July 2026 (UTC)

Ryan Dominic Blair (born 23 February 1996) is a Scottish professional footballer who plays as a midfielder for Lowland Football League East club Brechin City.

== Career ==
=== Falkirk ===
Born in Glasgow, Blair began his career at Falkirk, and made his professional debut for the club on 6 September 2014 against Stranraer in the Scottish Challenge Cup.

In the 2015–16 season he made seven appearances for the side in the Scottish Championship, one appearance in the Scottish League Cup, and one appearance in the Scottish Cup.

=== Swansea City ===
Blair moved to Swansea City in January 2016 for an undisclosed fee, signing a three-and-a-half-year contract and joining up with their under-21 squad.

Blair returned to Falkirk on loan in January 2018, where he played eight times and scored once. In January 2019, he signed for Falkirk's derby rivals Dunfermline Athletic on a short-term loan deal until the end of the 2018–19 season.

He was released by the club in July 2019.

=== Stenhousemuir ===
Blair returned to Scotland on a permanent basis, joining Stenhousemuir on 29 November 2019. Blair was among 18 players released by the club in May 2021.

=== East Kilbride ===
Blair joined Lowland League side East Kilbride in October 2021 and left for League One side East Fife three months later in 2022.

=== East Fife ===
After leaving East Kilbride after only four months, Blair joined Methil side East Fife on 2 January 2022.

=== Dumbarton ===
Having left East Fife, Blair joined Scottish League Two side Dumbarton in June 2022. He scored his first goal for the club with a superb free-kick against Elgin City in February 2023. In April 2023 Blair agreed a new two-year deal with the Sons. He netted his first career brace in a 6–2 win against The Spartans in March 2024 - both from free-kicks.

=== Brechin City ===
Blair left Dumbarton to join Brechin City in July 2026.

== Career statistics ==
As of 22:19 July 28, 2026.

Appearances and goals by club, season and competition
Club	Season	League			National Cup		League Cup		Other		Total	
Club	Season	Division	Apps	Goals	Apps	Goals	Apps	Goals	Apps	Goals	Apps	Goals
Falkirk	2014–15	Scottish Championship	0	0	0	0	0	0	1 (Note: Appearance in the Scottish Challenge Cup)	0	1	0
Falkirk	2015–16	Scottish Championship	7	0	1	0	1	0	0	0	9	0
Falkirk	Total		7	0	1	0	1	0	1	0	10	0
Swansea City U23s	2016–17	Premier League 2 - Div 2	—		—		—		5 (Note: Appearances in the EFL Trophy)	0	5	0
Swansea City U23s	2017–18	Premier League 2 - Div 1	—		—		—		2	0	2	0
Swansea City U23s	2018–19	Premier League 2 - Div 1	—		—		—		2	0	2	0
Swansea City U23s	Total		—		—		—		9	0	9	0
Falkirk (loan)	2017–18	Scottish Championship	7	1	1	0	0	0	0	0	8	1
Dunfermline Athletic (loan)	2018–19	Scottish Championship	13	1	0	0	0	0	0	0	13	1
Stenhousemuir	2019–20	Scottish League Two	14	1	0	0	0	0	0	0	14	1
Stenhousemuir	2020–21	Scottish League Two	21	0	2	0	3	0	0	0	26	0
Stenhousemuir	Total		35	1	2	0	3	0	0	0	40	1
East Fife	2021–22	Scottish League One	17	0	0	0	0	0	0	0	17	0
Dumbarton	2022–23	Scottish League Two	34	1	3	0	3	0	3	0	43	1
Dumbarton	2023–24	Scottish League Two	27	3	2	0	4	0	3	0	36	3
Dumbarton	2024–25	Scottish League One	24	2	1	0	4	0	2	0	31	2
Dumbarton	2025–26	Scottish League Two	22	1	1	0	3	0	7	0	33	1
Dumbarton	2026–27	Scottish League Two	0	0	0	0	2	0	0	0	2	0
Dumbarton	Total		107	7	7	0	16	0	15	0	145	7
Career total			186	10	11	0	20	0	25	0	342	10
