= Ethan Schilte-Brown =

Canadian soccer player (born 2005)

Personal information
- Date of birth: June 1, 2005 (age 21)
- Place of birth: Richmond, Virginia, United States
- Height: 1.91 m (6 ft 3 in)
- Position: Defender

Team information
- Current team: Glentoran (on loan from Kilmarnock)
- Number: 16

Youth career
- Tampa Bay United
- Space Coast United
- Kilmarnock

Senior career*
Years	Team	Apps	(Gls)
2023	HFX Wanderers	0	(0)
2023–	Kilmarnock	19	(0)
2023	→ Cumnock Juniors (loan)		
2024	→ Albion Rovers (loan)	10	(0)
2024	→ Dumbarton (loan)	14	(0)
2026–	→ Glentoran (loan)	0	(0)

International career^{‡}
2024	Canada U20	2	(0)
- * Club domestic league appearances and goals as of August 26, 2026 ‡ National team caps and goals as of July 31, 2024

Ethan Schilte-Brown (born June 1, 2005) is a soccer player who plays as a defender for Glentoran based in Belfast, Northern Ireland . Born in the United States, he represents Canada at youth level.

== Early life ==
Schilte-Brown was born on June 1, 2005. Born in Richmond, Virginia, United States, he is the son of Canadian soccer coach Denise Schilte-Brown.

== Club career ==
As a youth player, Schilte-Brown joined the youth academy of American side Tampa Bay United. Ahead of the 2023 season, he signed for Canadian side HFX Wanderers. Later the same year, he signed for Scottish side Kilmarnock, before being sent on loan to Scottish side Cumnock Juniors.

Following his stint there, he was sent on loan to Scottish side Albion Rovers, where he made ten league appearances. Subsequently, he was sent on loan to Scottish side Dumbarton, where he made fourteen league appearances.

== International career ==
Schilte-Brown is a Canada youth international. During the summer of 2024, he played for the Canada men's national under-20 soccer team at the 2024 CONCACAF U-20 Championship.
