= Mouhamed Niang =

Senegalese football player

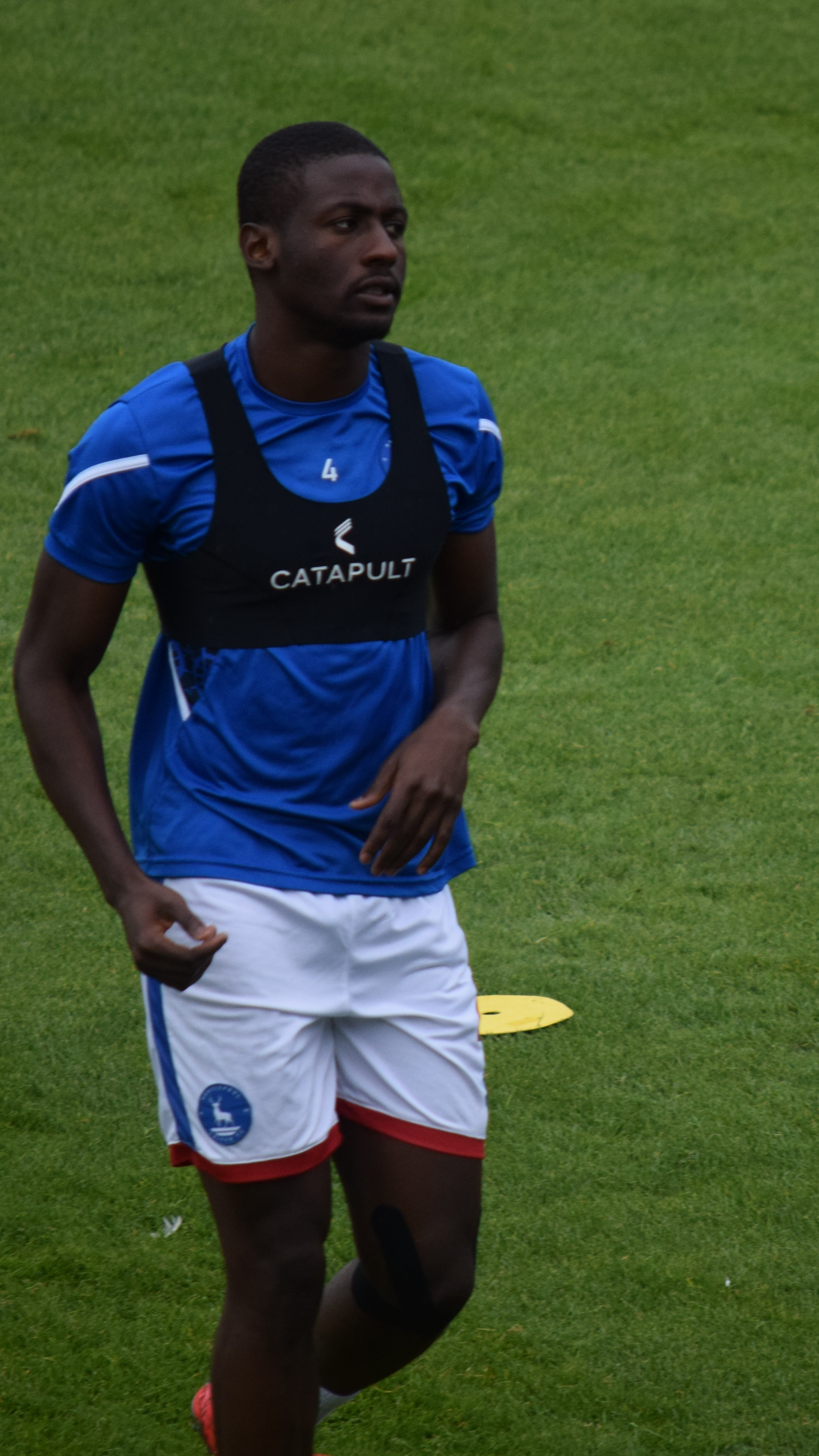
- Niang warming up for Hartlepool United in 2022

Personal information
- Full name: Mouhamed Niang
- Date of birth: 8 October 1999 (age 27)
- Place of birth: Dakar, Senegal
- Positions: Defensive midfielder; centre back

Team information
- Current team: Annan Athletic
- Number: 15

Youth career
- Pollok

Senior career*
Years	Team	Apps	(Gls)
2017–2018	Pollok	19	(0)
2018–2022	Partick Thistle	17	(0)
2019	→ Cumnock Juniors (loan)		
2019–2020	→ Montrose (loan)	14	(1)
2021–2022	→ Alloa Athletic (loan)	30	(1)
2022–2023	Hartlepool United	13	(0)
2023–2024	Cove Rangers	33	(1)
2024–2025	Dumbarton	34	(1)
2025	East Kilbride	0	(0)
2025–2026	Clyde	29	(1)
2026–	Annan Athletic	9	(1)
- * Club domestic league appearances and goals as of 05:36, 14 November 2026

Mouhamed "Sena" Niang (born 8 October 1999) is a Senegalese professional footballer who plays as a midfielder for Scottish League Two club Annan Athletic.

== Playing career ==
=== Pollok ===
Niang began his playing career with Pollok in August 2017. He made his competitive debut for the club in a 1–0 win against Arthurlie in the Sectional League Cup. He played the game at Right Back but previously his normal position under his coach Bill Reside at Pollok Under 19s was at sweeper but could quite easily move into midfield if required Niang made a total of 19 league appearances for Pollok.

=== Partick Thistle ===
After impressing with Pollok, Niang joined Partick Thistle on trial playing for their reserves. However, his signing process was delayed due to work permit issues. Sena officially signed for the club on 18 September 2018. In January 2019, he signed an extended contract with Thistle and immediately moved out on loan to Cumnock Juniors for the remainder of the 2019–20 season to gain first-team experience.

On 30 September 2019, Niang joined Scottish League One side Montrose on loan until January. He made 15 appearances in all competitions for Montrose, scoring once.

After making his debut for Thistle in the Scottish Challenge Cup in 2019, Sena made his league debut for the club on 17 October 2020 coming on as a substitute for Salim Kouider-Aïssa in a 1–0 defeat to Clyde. In November 2020, he won Partick's Player of the Month award. After establishing himself in the Thistle first team during 2020, Niang signed a three-year contract extension with Thistle on 17 December 2020. He made 17 league appearances in the 2020–21 season as Thistle won Scottish League One and achieved promotion to the Scottish Championship.

In August 2021, Niang moved on loan to Scottish League One side Alloa Athletic for the entirety of the 2021–22 season. He played 34 times for the club in all competitions, scoring four times.

=== Hartlepool United ===
On 23 June 2022, it was announced that Sena had joined League Two side Hartlepool United. He left Hartlepool at the end of the 2022–23 season and made 17 appearances in all competitions for the club.

=== Cove Rangers ===
Following his release from Hartlepool, Niang signed a full-time two-year deal with Scottish League One side Cove Rangers. The move saw him link up with his former Hartlepool boss Paul Hartley who revealed he had tried to sign Sena for Cove Rangers during the previous January transfer window.

=== Dumbarton ===
After one season at Cove, Niang left the club for fellow Scottish League One side Dumbarton – saying he was keen to move back to the Central Belt. In a difficult season for the Sons, as they went into administration, Niang was named the club's Player of the Year. He made 34 league appearances for the club, scoring once.

=== East Kilbride ===
In June 2025, Sena signed for Scottish League Two side East Kilbride on a free transfer. However, he did not play a game for the club and left by mutual consent just three weeks after signing alongside Josh O'Connor. Upon his departure, East Kilbride manager Mick Kennedy said "When the boys came in, we had conversations quite early on and they were concerned about their ability to play once they were in amongst the group, and we were just honest with them. Niang, in particular, was looking for assurances that he was going to be guaranteed to play every week but I just explained to him that wasn’t going to happen. I don’t think anyone gets those assurances at East Kilbride. So he just asked that, if that was the case, could he move on? And I said: ‘Yeah, of course.’"

=== Clyde FC ===
Upon leaving East Kilbride, Niang signed for fellow Scottish League Two side Clyde on a one-year contract. He scored his first goal for the club in a 6–0 away win against Annan Athletic on 13 September 2025.

=== Annan Athletic ===
Following a successful trial, Niang signed for Scottish League Two side Annan Athletic in August 2026.

== Style of play ==
Sena is predominately a defensive midfielder but he is also capable of playing in central midfield, as well as in the centre of defence where he played numerous times for Partick. He is a tough tackler and in October 2021, he picked up one of the fastest red cards in Scottish football history when he was sent off for a lunge after 25 seconds for Alloa against Cove Rangers. In January 2022, Sena picked up a two match ban due to crunching tackle on Celtic midfielder Yosuke Ideguchi. He was described by Paul Hartley, who has managed Niang at Hartlepool and Cove Rangers, as "competitive, he can operate in a couple of different positions. He's an aggressive player, which I like, and he also keeps it simple. He knows how to play the position."

== Personal life ==
Nicknamed "Sena", Niang was born in Dakar in Senegal but his family moved to Manchester in 2004. In 2008, his family moved back to Senegal for two years before moving to Glasgow. He is a fan of Manchester United but described Senegal-born Patrick Vieira as his footballing hero. Niang attended All Saints Roman Catholic Secondary School and played for their school team.

== Career statistics ==
As of 5 May 2026 (UTC)

Club	Season	League			Cup		League Cup		Other		Total	
Club	Season	Division	Apps	Goals	Apps	Goals	Apps	Goals	Apps	Goals	Apps	Goals
Partick Thistle	2019–20	Scottish Championship	0	0	0	0	0	0	1 (Note: Appearances in the Scottish Challenge Cup)	0	1	0
Partick Thistle	2020–21	Scottish League One	17	0	2 (Note: Appearances in the Scottish FA Cup)	0	3 (Note: Appearances in the Scottish League Cup)	0	0	0	22	0
Partick Thistle	2021–22	Scottish Championship	0	0	0	0	2	0	0	0	2	0
Partick Thistle total			17	0	2	0	5	0	1	0	25	0
Montrose (loan)	2019–20	Scottish League One	14	1	1	0	0	0	–	–	15	1
Alloa (loan)	2021–22	Scottish League One	30	1	2	2	–	–	2	1	34	4
Hartlepool United	2022–23	League Two	13	0	0	0	1 (Note: Appearances in the EFL Cup)	0	3 (Note: Appearances in the EFL Trophy)	0	17	0
Cove Rangers	2023–24	Scottish League One	33	1	3	0	4	0	1	0	41	1
Dumbarton	2024–25	Scottish League One	34	1	2	1	4	0	1	0	41	2
Clyde	2025–26	Scottish League Two	29	1	1	0	2	0	5	1	37	2
Career total			170	5	11	3	16	0	13	2	210	10

== Honours ==
Partick Thistle

- Scottish League One: 2020–21

Individual

- Dumbarton Player of the Year: 2024–25
