= Aron Lynas =

Scottish footballer (born 1996)

Personal information
- Date of birth: 19 April 1996 (age 30)
- Place of birth: Kirkcaldy, Fife, Scotland
- Positions: Defender; right back

Team information
- Current team: Forfar Athletic
- Number: 2

Senior career*
Years	Team	Apps	(Gls)
2013–2015	Cowdenbeath	0	(0)
2015–2016	Alloa Athletic	1	(0)
2015–2016	→ East Stirlingshire (loan)	15	(0)
2016–2019	Brechin City	73	(1)
2019–2022	Albion Rovers	75	(0)
2022–2026	Dumbarton	85	(4)
2026–	Forfar Athletic	14	(1)
- * Club domestic league appearances and goals as of 4 May 2026

Aron Lynas (born 19 April 1996) is a Scottish footballer who plays as a defender for Scottish League Two side Forfar Athletic. He has also played for Cowdenbeath, Alloa Athletic, East Stirlingshire, Brechin City, Albion Rovers and Dumbarton.

== Career ==
Born in Kirkcaldy, Fife, Lynas began his career at Cowdenbeath. He was first named in a matchday squad on 21 December 2013, remaining an unused substitute in their 3–3 draw at Raith Rovers in the Scottish Championship. Over the season and the following campaign, he was named for ten more league games, but never made an appearance. On 21 May 2015, after relegation to Scottish League One, he was one of six players released by the club.

Lynas returned to the Scottish Championship with Alloa Athletic. He made his professional debut on 16 August 2015, replacing Graeme Holmes in the 57th minute of a 1–5 home defeat to Rangers.

In October 2015, Lynas was loaned out to Scottish League Two bottom side East Stirlingshire as an emergency loan until January 2015. He made his debut on 3 October, playing the full 90 minutes of a 2–1 loss at Berwick Rangers. On 14 November, he was sent off in a 5–3 loss at East Fife, the last of three dismissals that day. Following the relegation of the Shire as well as his parent club, Lynas was released by Alloa.

After his released from Alloa, Lynas signed for Scottish League One side Brechin City for the 2016–17 season.

On 29 May 2019, Lynas signed a pre-contract with Albion Rovers for the 2019–20 season. After three seasons at Cliftonhill, during which time he captained the club, Lynas joined Dumbarton in the summer of 2022. He scored his first goal for the club in a 4-0 victory against Elgin City in November 2022. Lynas extended his contract at The Rock in April 2023 and was named as the club's Player of the Year a month later. He made 33 appearances, scoring twice, the following season as the Sons were promoted to Scottish League One - before extending his contract for a further year. He left the club in February 2026 having played 120 times and scored four goals as a Dumbarton player and joined Forfar Athletic.

== Career statistics ==
As of 19:09, 3 January 2026 (UTC)

Appearances and goals by club, season and competition
Club	Season	League			Scottish Cup		League Cup		Other		Total	
Club	Season	Division	Apps	Goals	Apps	Goals	Apps	Goals	Apps	Goals	Apps	Goals
Alloa Athletic	2015–16	Scottish Championship	1	0	0	0	0	0	0	0	1	0
East Stirlingshire (loan)	2015–16	Scottish League Two	15	0	1	0	0	0	2 (Note: Appearance(s) in the Scottish League Two play-offs)	0	18	0
Brechin City	2016–17	Scottish League One	26	0	1	0	2	0	6 (Note: Two appearances in the Scottish Challenge Cup and four in the Championship play-offs)	0	35	0
Brechin City	2017–18	Scottish Championship	27	0	1	0	4	0	0	0	32	0
Brechin City	2018–19	Scottish League One	20	1	1	0	4	0	1 (Note: Appearance(s) in the Scottish Challenge Cup)	0	26	1
Brechin City	Total		73	1	3	0	10	0	7	0	93	1
Albion Rovers	2019–20	Scottish League Two	20	0	3	0	4	0	1	0	28	0
Albion Rovers	2020–21	Scottish League Two	21	0	0	0	3	0	0	0	24	0
Albion Rovers	2021–22	Scottish League Two	34	0	2	0	3	0	2	0	41	0
Albion Rovers	Total		75	0	5	0	10	0	3	0	93	0
Dumbarton	2022–23	Scottish League Two	35	2	3	0	4	0	3	0	45	2
Dumbarton	2023–24	Scottish League Two	24	2	3	0	4	0	2	0	33	2
Dumbarton	2024–25	Scottish League One	16	0	1	0	2	0	2	0	21	0
Dumbarton	2025–26	Scottish League Two	9	0	2	0	3	0	7	0	21	0
Career total			248	5	15	0	29	0	23	0	324	5
