= Cameron Clark (footballer, born 2000) =

Scottish footballer (born 2000)

Personal information
- Date of birth: 24 October 2000 (age 26)
- Place of birth: Scotland
- Position: Defender

Team information
- Current team: Annan Athletic
- Number: 16

Youth career
- Partick Thistle
- 2016-2018: Greenock Morton
- 2018-2019: Livingston

Senior career*
Years	Team	Apps	(Gls)
2019-2020	Queen's Park	11	(0)
2020	→ Annan Athletic (loan)	3	(0)
2020-2022	Annan Athletic	33	(1)
2022-2024	Stirling Albion	56	(3)
2024-2026	Dumbarton	29	(0)
2026-	Annan Athletic	9	(0)

International career
2018	Scotland U18	1	(0)
- * Club domestic league appearances and goals as of 5 May 2026

Cameron Clark (born 24 October 2000) is a Scottish professional footballer who last played as a defender for Annan Athletic.

== Club career ==
=== Youth career ===
Clark started his career in the Partick Thistle youth ranks before transferring to Greenock Morton and then Livingston.

=== Senior career ===
In 2019, Clark signed his first professional contract with Queen's Park and went on to make 11 appearances for The Spiders. He struggled to hold down a regular starting position for the club and had a loan spell at Annan Athletic in the 2019-2020 season, before making the move permanent that summer.

The defender was then signed for Stirling Albion by manager Darren Young. He scored his first goal for the Binos in a 4-1 away victory against Forfar on 24 September 2022. After two seasons at Forthbank, Clark signed for Dumbarton in June 2024 he remained with the club for 18 months, played 46 times, before leaving by mutual consent in January 2026.

== International career ==
Clark played for Scotland U18 in a 0-0 draw against Northern Ireland U18 in March 2018.
