= Joel Mumbongo =

Swedish footballer

Personal information
- Full name: Joel Ngebany Mumbongo
- Date of birth: 9 January 1999 (age 27)
- Place of birth: Gothenburg, Sweden
- Height: 1.88 m (6 ft 2 in)
- Position: Striker

Youth career
- Nödinge SK
- IF Warta
- Lundby IF
- 2011–2015: Örgryte IS
- 2015–2016: BK Häcken

Senior career*
Years	Team	Apps	(Gls)
2017	BK Häcken	0	(0)
2018	Utsiktens BK	15	(7)
2018–2019	Hellas Verona	0	(0)
2019–2022	Burnley	4	(0)
2021	→ Accrington Stanley (loan)	10	(2)
2022–2023	Tranmere Rovers	19	(0)
2023–2024	Hamilton Academical	8	(0)
2024	→ Queen of the South (loan)	12	(5)
2024–2025	Dumbarton	32	(2)
2025–2026	Annan Athletic	12	(2)

International career^{‡}
2016	Sweden U17	3	(0)
2016–2018	Sweden U19	10	(1)
- * Club domestic league appearances and goals as of 5 May 2026 ‡ National team caps and goals as of 9 January 2021

Joel Ngebany Mumbongo (born 9 January 1999) is a Swedish professional footballer who last played as a striker for Scottish League Two side Annan Athletic.

== Early life ==
Mumbongo was born in Gothenburg, Sweden to parents of Congolese descent, Jonathan and Marie. He has a younger sister, Charité, who plays handball for the Sweden national team. He spent his early days in Biskopsgården before the family moved to Nödinge-Nol when he was 10 years-old. He started playing youth football for Lundby IF, IF Warta and Nödinge SK. At the age of twelve he used to train with Gothenburg club Örgryte IS after his parents had contacted the youth coach requesting for a trial. He was also a gifted sprinter during his teenage years and was ranked as one of the best in his region.

== Club career ==
=== Early career ===
Whilst at Örgryte IS a number of European clubs were beginning to show an interest in Mumbongo. English Premier League side Chelsea contacted his father with the offer of taking Mumbongo on trial, but the trial never materialised. At the age of 15 he went on trial at Manchester City after a Swedish scout had recommended him and was included in an under-16 squad for a tournament in Salzburg. He scored a few goals despite not starting every match but the interest stalled. He subsequently had a short trial at Everton but Mumbongo's father decided that it would be best for his son to finish his studies and play for a top flight club in Sweden.

=== BK Häcken ===
At the age of 16, in the summer of 2015, he left Örgryte to join Häcken. He continued his development in the youth side earning international honours and attracted interest from English clubs again, going on trial with Stoke City and Southampton. He never made a first team appearance for Häcken despite making the bench twice in the Allsvenskan and training with the side.

=== Utsiktens BK ===
He decided to drop down two divisions in February 2018 so he could play regularly, when the opportunity arose to sign for Division 1 side Utsiktens BK. He had an impressive goal scoring record in his six months with side, scoring 7 goals in 15 matches. This goal scoring form alerted EFL Championship side Birmingham City who invited him to train with the side. He was all set to sign a contract with all the paperwork completed when the English Football League placed Birmingham under a transfer embargo and the deal was blocked.

=== Hellas Verona ===
Mumbongo later signed a one-year deal for Italian side Hellas Verona in August 2018, who had recently been relegated to Serie B. A Hellas Verona scout had spotted Munbongo in a UEFA European Under-19 Championship qualifier against Italy the year previous. He played a number of games in the under-19 Primavera side before sustaining an anterior cruciate ligament injury in a match in October 2018, which kept him out of action for four months. He never made an appearance for the first team as the side were promoted back to Serie A via the play-offs and he returned to Sweden for rehabilitation as a free agent at the end of his contract.

=== Burnley ===
In the summer of 2019 he was spotted on LinkedIn by Jon Pepper, head of the academy at Premier League side Burnley. Pepper contacted Mumbongo's agent asking for his CV and clips of him in action. Pepper liaised with the under-23 manager Steve Stone, and they both agreed to invite him for a trial. He joined the under-23 side for their pre-season trip to Poland and played in a number of games. Burnley were reluctant to sign him immediately as he had not fully recovered from his injury sustained at Verona. Three months after he had finished his rehabilitation back to full fitness, he was rewarded with a contract until the end of the season in October 2019. After getting more consistent regular minutes at under-23 level he was offered a new 18-month contract in January 2020. In December 2020 he was nominated for the Premier League 2 player of the month award for November after scoring 4 goals in 5 games. Around a month later, on 9 January 2021, he made his first team debut in a third-round FA Cup tie against Milton Keynes Dons at Turf Moor. He came on as a late substitute with the side 1–0 down, eventually providing the assist for Matěj Vydra in stoppage time to level the tie. Burnley went on to win the tie on penalties after extra time. On 31 January 2021, he made his Premier League debut as a substitute for Robbie Brady in a 2–0 away defeat by Chelsea.

=== Accrington Stanley (loan) ===
On 1 July 2021, Mumbongo joined League One side Accrington Stanley on a season-long loan deal. He scored his first goal for the club in their 1-0 win over Shrewsbury Town. On June 10 Burnley announced that Mumbongo would leave the club at the end of June when his contract expired.

=== Tranmere Rovers ===
On 28 July 2022, Mumbongo joined League Two club Tranmere Rovers on a one-year contract. on 9 May 2023, the club announced he would be released.

=== Hamilton Academical ===
On 23 September 2023, Mumbongo was announced to have joined Scottish League One club Hamilton Academical.

=== Queen of the South (loan) ===
On 1 February 2024, Mumbongo joined Queen of the South on loan until 31 May 2024. He went on to score five times in five starts and seven substitute appearances for the club.

=== Dumbarton ===
Mumbongo joined newly promoted Dumbarton in July 2024 on a season long deal. He scored twice in 36 games for the club as they were relegated to Scottish League Two before being released in May 2025.

=== Annan Athletic ===
Mumbongo joined Annan Athletic of Scottish League Two in the summer of 2025, but suffered a serious injury early in the season that kept him out of action until January. He scored his first goal for the club, the winner, against former side Dumbarton in February 2026 - following it up with another goal four days later against East Kilbride. Those would be the only goals he would score for the Galabankies however, and Mumbongo was released by the club in May 2026.

== International career ==
He is a youth international for Sweden and has represented them at under-17 and under-19 level. He featured 6 times in the qualifiers for the 2018 UEFA European Under-19 Championship, scoring once in a 3–2 defeat to Serbia. Sweden qualified for the final tournament in Finland but Mumbongo wasn't selected in the squad for the Championships.

== Career statistics ==
As of 15:46, 3 May 2025 (UTC)

Appearances and goals by club, season and competition
Club	Season	League			National Cup (Note: Includes FA Cup)		League Cup (Note: Includes EFL Cup)		Other		Total	
Club	Season	Division	Apps	Goals	Apps	Goals	Apps	Goals	Apps	Goals	Apps	Goals
Häcken	2017	Allsvenskan	0	0	0	0	—		—		0	0
Utsikten	2018	Division 1	15	7	0	0	—		—		15	7
Hellas Verona	2018–19	Serie B	0	0	0	0	—		—		0	0
Burnley	2019–20	Premier League	0	0	0	0	0	0	—		0	0
Burnley	2020–21	Premier League	4	0	3	0	0	0	—		7	0
Burnley	2021–22	Premier League	0	0	—		—		—		0	0
Burnley	Total		4	0	3	0	0	0	—		7	0
Accrington Stanley (loan)	2021–22	League One	10	2	1	0	1	0	3 (Note: Appearance in EFL Trophy)	0	15	2
Tranmere Rovers	2022–23	League Two	19	0	0	0	1	0	0	0	20	0
Hamilton Academical	2023–24	Scottish League One	8	0	1	0	0	0	2	1	11	1
Queen of the South	2023–24	Scottish League One	12	5	0	0	0	0	0	0	12	5
Dumbarton	2024–25	Scottish League One	32	2	2	0	1	0	1	0	36	2
Annan Athletic	2025–26	Scottish League Two	12	2	0	0	1	0	0	0	13	2
Career total			112	18	6	0	4	0	4	0	129	19
