= Carlo Pignatiello =

Scottish footballer

Personal information
- Full name: Carlo Ross Pignatiello
- Date of birth: 16 January 2000 (age 26)
- Place of birth: Glasgow, Scotland
- Position: Midfielder

Team information
- Current team: Queen's Park
- Number: 12

Youth career
- Rangers
- St Mirren
- Livingston

Senior career*
Years	Team	Apps	(Gls)
2020–2022	Livingston	1	(0)
2018–2019	→ BSC Glasgow (loan)	?	(?)
2019–2020	→ Stranraer (loan)	20	(1)
2021	→ Arbroath (loan)	3	(0)
2021–2022	→ Dumbarton (loan)	35	(1)
2022–2023	Greenock Morton	21	(0)
2023–2025	Dumbarton	64	(10)
2025–	Queen's Park	29	(0)
- * Club domestic league appearances and goals as of 4 May 2026

Carlo Pignatiello (born 16 January 2000) is a Scottish professional footballer who plays for Scottish Championship side Queen's Park.

== Career ==
Pignatiello began his career at youth level with Rangers and later played for St Mirren before joining Livingston. He had loan spells with BSC Glasgow in the Lowland League, where he was voted the club's Young Player of the Season, and Stranraer in Scottish League One.

He made his professional debut as a late substitute in a Scottish Premiership 3–2 defeat against Celtic in September 2020. Pignatiello was loaned to Arbroath in February 2021. He then joined Dumbarton on a season long loan in July 2021. He scored his first goal for the Sons in a 3–1 victory against Sauchie Juniors in November 2021 and was named the club's Young Player of the Year and Players' Player of the Year at the end of the season.

On 23 May 2022, it was announced, via the club's website, that he would join Greenock Morton on a pre-contract deal. He made his first appearance for the club in a pre-season friendly draw against Annan Athletic at Raydale Park. Pignatiello left Morton by mutual consent at the end of the 2022–23 season, with the club saying he wished to pursue an opportunity outside of football. He returned to Dumbarton on a two-year deal in May 2023 and was named in the PFA League Two Team of the Year for the 2023–24 season as he helped the Sons to promotion to Scottish League One. He scored the club's first goal back in League One, a volleyed equaliser in a 1-1 draw with Inverness Caledonian Thistle. After the club were relegated having entered administration, Pignatiello joined Scottish Championship side Queen's Park in June 2025.
