= Tony Wallace (footballer) =

Scottish footballer

Personal information
- Date of birth: 22 February 1991 (age 35)
- Place of birth: Glasgow, Scotland
- Position: Midfielder

Team information
- Current team: Dumbarton
- Number: 11

Youth career
- Dumbarton

Senior career*
Years	Team	Apps	(Gls)
2010—2012	Dumbarton	26	(0)
2012—2014	Greenock Morton	34	(1)
2014	→ Queen's Park (loan)	6	(2)
2014	→ Queen's Park (loan)	4	(0)
2014—2015	BSC Glasgow		
2015—2016	Nairn County		
2016–2017	East Fife	16	(0)
2017–2018	East Kilbride		
2018–2019	Annan Athletic	33	(12)
2019–2021	Clyde	17	(0)
2021	Gartcairn		
2021–2023	Annan Athletic	80	(23)
2023–	Dumbarton	92	(19)

International career^{‡}
	Scotland U19	3	(0)
- * Club domestic league appearances and goals as of 20:21, 14 November 2026 (UTC) ‡ National team caps and goals as of 20:38, 7 November 2026 (UTC)

Tony Wallace (born 22 February 1991 in Glasgow) is a Scottish footballer who plays as a midfielder for Scottish League Two club Dumbarton.

He began his senior career with Dumbarton, then signed for Greenock Morton, although he spent the end of 2013–14 on loan at Queen's Park. In 2014, he signed for Lowland Football League side BSC Glasgow, and then moved to Highland Football League outfit Nairn County in July 2015. He also had spells with East Fife, East Kilbride, Annan Athletic, Clyde and Gartcairn.

== Career ==
=== Dumbarton ===
Wallace was a bit part player during his two seasons with the first team at Dumbarton, coming to the fore in their victory in the play-offs to win promotion to the Scottish First Division.

This performance earned him a move to full-time First Division side Greenock Morton for a nominal fee.

=== Greenock Morton ===
Wallace scored on his début for Morton in a Challenge Cup first round tie against Albion Rovers.

In February 2014, Wallace went on loan to Queen's Park for a month. After his loan spell, he returned to Morton for one start before being sent back on loan to Queen's Park until the end of the season. He left Morton in the summer of 2014.

=== Lowland and Highland Leagues ===
After leaving Morton, Wallace joined newly-formed BSC Glasgow competing in the Lowland Football League. He left BSC after winning the SFA Challenge Cup in his only season at the club.

On 18 July 2015, Wallace moved to Highland Football League club Nairn County, signing a one-year contract.

=== Return to senior football ===
In June 2016, Wallace returned to the SPFL, signing for Scottish League One side East Fife. He was released by East Fife after one season with the side.

=== Later career ===
Wallace joined Lowland Football League side East Kilbride in November 2017. After a season Wallace returned to the SPFL with Annan Athletic and scored his first goal for them in the Scottish Challenge Cup against Celtic U21.

On 26 May 2019, Wallace moved to Clyde, signing a two-year contract but left in January 2020 for Gartcairn. He returned to Annan Athletic in March 2021 scoring 18 times in the 2021-22 season. The following season he was part of the first Galabankies squad to win promotion from Scottish League Two. He returned to Dumbarton in May 2023 after leaving Annan scoring the first goal of his second spell with the club in a 2-1 win against Inverness Caledonian Thistle in July 2023. He extended his deal with the club until the summer of 2025 in February 2024. Wallace netted 16 times as the Sons won the promotion playoffs from Scottish League Two in the 2023-24 season - his second straight promotion from the fourth tier, and second playoff victory as a Dumbarton player.
