= 2025–26 Queen's Park F.C. season =

Queen's Park
2025–26 season
- President: Graeme Shields (until 10 August)
- Manager: Sean Crighton
- Stadium: Lesser Hampden
- Scottish Championship: Sixth place
- Scottish Cup: Fifth round
- League Cup: Group stage
- Challenge Cup: Quarter-finals
- Glasgow Cup: Group stage
- Top goalscorer: League: Josh Fowler (10); All: Josh Fowler (19)
- Highest home attendance: 907 vs. Partick Thistle, Championship, 30 September 2025
- Lowest home attendance: 338 vs. Forfar Athletic, Challenge Cup, 13 January 2026
- Average home league attendance: 859
Home colours	Away colours	Third colours

The 2025–26 season is Queen's Park's fourth season in the Scottish Championship following their promotion from League One at the end of the 2021–22 season. Queen's will also compete in the Scottish Cup, League Cup, Challenge Cup and the Glasgow Cup.

== Summary ==
On 15 May, Queen's announced that long-standing academy coach Sean Crighton had been promoted to become the club's new first-team coach ahead of the new season.

On 23 May, it was announced that former Dundee manager Jim Duffy would be joining the club's coaching staff as assistant coach to Crighton.

== Results and fixtures ==
Win Draw Loss Postponed

=== Pre-season and friendlies ===
24 June 2025 Friendly	Queen's Park	2–0	Annan Athletic	Glasgow
19:30	Fowler 60 pen.', 78'	Report		Stadium: Lesser Hampden

1 July 2025 Friendly	Albion Rovers	3–3	Queen's Park	Coatbridge
19:30	Duncan 2 pen.' Trialist 45'; Trialist 81'	Report	McDonnell 41'; Fowler 63', 79 pen.'	Stadium: Cliftonhill

4 July 2025 Friendly	Queen's Park	0–1	Celtic	Glasgow
19:45		Report	Kenny 30'	Stadium: Lesser Hampden

=== Scottish Championship ===
2 August 2025 1	Raith Rovers	1–1	Queen's Park	Kirkcaldy
15:00	Easton 81 pen.'	Report	Ruth 10 pen.'	Stadium: Stark's Park; Attendance: 3,391; Referee: Duncan Nicolson

9 August 2025 2	Queen's Park	1–3	Arbroath	Glasgow
15:00	Fowler 84'	Report	Callachan 50'; Marshall 51'; Wilkie 72'	Stadium: Lesser Hampden; Attendance: 846; Referee: Grant Irvine

23 August 2025 3	Airdrieonians	1–1	Queen's Park	Airdrie
15:00	Henderson 52'	Report	McDonnell 80'	Stadium: Excelsior Stadium; Attendance: 1,385; Referee: Matthew MacDermid

30 August 2025 4	Ayr United	1–1	Queen's Park	Ayr
15:00	Shiels 83 o.g.'	Report	Fowler 33 pen.'	Stadium: Somerset Park; Attendance: 1,997; Referee: John Beaton

13 September 2025 5	Queen's Park	0–0	Greenock Morton	Glasgow
15:00		Report		Stadium: Lesser Hampden; Attendance: 897; Referee: Ross Hardie

20 September 2025 6	Ross County	1–2	Queen's Park	Dingwall
15:00	Hale 44 pen.' Gallagher (red card) 60'	Report	Fowler 39', 76'	Stadium: Victoria Park; Attendance: 2,800; Referee: Alastair Grieve

27 September 2025 7	Queen's Park	1–2	St Johnstone	Glasgow
15:00	Fowler 43'	Report	Fotheringham 37'; McPake 89'	Stadium: Lesser Hampden; Attendance: 893; Referee: Peter Stuart

30 September 2025 8	Queen's Park	0–1	Partick Thistle	Glasgow
19:45		Report	Watt 7'	Stadium: Lesser Hampden; Attendance: 907; Referee: Sean Murdoch

4 October 2025 9	Dunfermline Athletic	0–0	Queen's Park	Dunfermline
15:00		Report		Stadium: East End Park; Attendance: 4,602; Referee: Grant Irvine

11 October 2025 10	Arbroath	4–1	Queen's Park	Arbroath
15:00	Reilly 9'; Steven 30'; Dow 42'; Marshall 87'	Report	Scott 79'	Stadium: Gayfield Park; Attendance: 1,254; Referee: Matthew MacDermid

18 October 2025 11	Queen's Park	0–0	Airdrieonians	Glasgow
15:00		Report		Stadium: Lesser Hampden; Attendance: 862; Referee: Colin Steven

25 October 2025 12	Queen's Park	0–0	Ayr United	Glasgow
15:00	Fieldson (red card) 9'	Report		Stadium: Lesser Hampden; Attendance: 886; Referee: Peter Stuart

1 November 2025 13	Partick Thistle	5–0	Queen's Park	Glasgow
15:00	Reading 16'; Stanway 45+11'; Chalmers 74'; Lets'osa 78'; McBeth 90+2'	Report		Stadium: Firhill Stadium; Attendance: 3,370; Referee: Chris Graham

8 November 2025 14	Queen's Park	2–1	Raith Rovers	Glasgow
15:00	Fowler 13', 78'	Report	O'Connor 22'	Stadium: Lesser Hampden; Attendance: 867; Referee: Calum Scott

15 November 2025 15	St Johnstone	4–3	Queen's Park	Perth
15:00	Gullan 16', 30 pen.' Stanton 18'; Baird 84'	Report	Drozd 59'; Fowler 62 pen.' Friel 90+2'	Stadium: McDiarmid Park; Attendance: 4,012; Referee: Alastair Grieve

5 December 2025 16	Greenock Morton	2–1	Queen's Park	Greenock
19:45	Adeloye 43 pen.' O'Halloran 90+2'	Report	Connolly 45'	Stadium: Cappielow; Attendance: 1,150; Referee: Peter Stuart

13 December 2025 17	Queen's Park	1–1	Dunfermline Athletic	Glasgow
15:00	Fieldson 40'	Report	Gilmour 81'	Stadium: Lesser Hampden; Attendance: 906; Referee: Iain Snedden

20 December 2025 18	Airdrieonians	0–3	Queen's Park	Airdrie
15:00		Report	Fowler 45+1', 64'; Fieldson 75'	Stadium: Excelsior Stadium; Attendance: 1,364; Referee: Grant Irvine

27 December 2025 19	Queen's Park	2–2	Partick Thistle	Glasgow
15:00	Drozd 29'; Murray 82'	Report	Stanway 12'; Murray 16 o.g.' Smyth (red card) 41'	Stadium: Lesser Hampden; Attendance: 939; Referee: Lloyd Wilson

24 January 2026 20	Raith Rovers	4–1	Queen's Park	Kirkcaldy
15:00	Hamilton 39', 64', 69'; Mullin 45'	Report	Drozd 76'	Stadium: Stark's Park; Attendance: 3,002; Referee: Colin Steven

31 January 2026 21	Queen's Park	2–1	Arbroath	Glasgow
15:00	Connolly 25'; Drozd 45'	Report	Robinson 19'	Stadium: Lesser Hampden; Attendance: 848; Referee: Iain Snedden

3 February 2026 22	Queen's Park	0–1	Ross County	Glasgow
19:45		Report	Ikpeazu 79'	Stadium: Lesser Hampden; Attendance: 718; Referee: Lloyd Wilson

14 February 2026 23	Ross County	0–1	Queen's Park	Dingwall
15:00		Report	Shiels 45+2'	Stadium: Victoria Park; Attendance: 2,897; Referee: Sean Murdoch

21 February 2026 24	Queen's Park	3–2	Greenock Morton	Glasgow
15:00	Todorov 8'; Fieldson 62'; Connolly 75'	Report	Shiels 3 o.g.' Wilson 72'	Stadium: Lesser Hampden; Attendance: 836; Referee: Lloyd Wilson

24 February 2026 25	Queen's Park	1–1	St Johnstone	Glasgow
19:45	Murray 90'	Report	Fowler 55'; Boyes (red card) 90+1'	Stadium: Lesser Hampden; Attendance: 805; Referee: Calum Scott

28 February 2026 26	Dunfermline Athletic	1–0	Queen's Park	Dunfermline
15:00	Morrison 25 pen.'	Report		Stadium: East End Park; Attendance: 4,783; Referee: David Dickinson

7 March 2026 27	Queen's Park	1–0	Airdrieonians	Glasgow
13:00	Ruth 30'	Report		Stadium: Lesser Hampden; Attendance: 885; Referee: Nick Walsh

10 March 2026 28	Ayr United	1–2	Queen's Park	Ayr
19:45	Dempsey 82'	Report	Smith 58'; Ruth 88'	Stadium: Somerset Park; Attendance: 1,414; Referee: Colin Steven

14 March 2026 29	Queen's Park	1–1	Ayr United	Glasgow
15:00	Murray 33'	Report	Dowds 24'	Stadium: Lesser Hampden; Attendance: 838; Referee: Ryan Lee

21 March 2026 30	Arbroath	1–0	Queen's Park	Arbroath
15:00	Reilly 16'	Report		Stadium: Gayfield Park; Attendance: 1,406; Referee: Dan McFarlane

28 March 2026 31	St Johnstone	1–1	Queen's Park	Perth
15:00	McPake 48'	Report	Murray 32'	Stadium: McDiarmid Park; Attendance: 3,798; Referee: Kevin Clancy

10 April 2026 32	Queen's Park	1–0	Ross County	Glasgow
19:45	Connolly 16'	Report		Stadium: Lesser Hampden; Attendance: 846; Referee: Colin Steven

14 April 2026 33	Queen's Park	0–2	Raith Rovers	Glasgow
19:45	Lamie (red card) 42'	Report	Vaughan 39 pen.', 55'	Stadium: Lesser Hampden; Attendance: 788; Referee: Kevin Clancy

18 April 2026 34	Greenock Morton	0–0	Queen's Park	Greenock
15:00		Report	Martin (red card) 57'	Stadium: Cappielow; Attendance: 1,881; Referee: Steven McLean

25 April 2026 35	Queen's Park	0–2	Dunfermline Athletic	Glasgow
15:00		Report	Chilokoa-Mullen 25'; Kane 46'	Stadium: Lesser Hampden; Attendance: 889; Referee: Ross Hardie

1 May 2026 36	Partick Thistle	1–1	Queen's Park	Glasgow
19:45	Watt 25'	Report	Ruth 64 pen.'	Stadium: Firhill Stadium; Attendance: 3,478; Referee: Jamie Wilkie

=== Scottish League Cup ===
==== Group stage ====
12 July 2025 Group Stage	The Spartans	2–1	Queen's Park	Edinburgh
15:00	Dall 83'; Russell 89 pen.'	Report	Fowler 35'	Stadium: Ainslie Park; Attendance: 395; Referee: Chris Graham

15 July 2025 Group Stage	Queen's Park	5–0	Brechin City	Glasgow
19:45	McDonnell 13', 60'; Fowler 46', 55'; Ruth 70'	Report		Stadium: Lesser Hampden; Attendance: 432; Referee: Alastair Grieve

22 July 2025 Group Stage	Falkirk	3–1	Queen's Park	Falkirk
19:45	Ross 42', 51'; Graham 86'	Report	Fowler 14'	Stadium: Falkirk Stadium; Attendance: 2,387; Referee: Nick Walsh

26 July 2025 Group Stage	Queen's Park	2–1	Cove Rangers	Glasgow
15:00	Ruth 20 pen.' Fowler 90+1'	Report	Megginson 15'	Stadium: Lesser Hampden; Attendance: 453; Referee: Daniel Graves

=== Scottish Challenge Cup ===
16 December 2025 Second round	Queen's Park	2–1	Clyde	Glasgow
19:45	Drozd 22'; Fowler 47'	Report	Williamson 45+2'	Stadium: Lesser Hampden; Attendance: 495; Referee: Alastair Grieve
Note: Match postponed due to Storm Bram.

13 January 2026 Third round	Queen's Park	2–0	Forfar Athletic	Glasgow
19:45	Fowler 86'; McLeish 90+3'	Report		Stadium: Lesser Hampden; Attendance: 338; Referee: Gavin Duncan

27 January 2026 Quarter-finals	Queen's Park	1–1 (1–3 p)	Raith Rovers	Glasgow
19:45	Fowler 73'	Report	Nsio 32'	Stadium: Lesser Hampden; Attendance: 524; Referee: Sean Murdoch

=== Scottish Cup ===
28 November 2025 Third round	Linlithgow Rose	1–3	Queen's Park	Linlithgow
19:45	McMullan 15'	Report	Murray 26'; Savoury 57'; Fowler 68'	Stadium: Linlithgow; Attendance: 1,183; Referee: Ryan Lee

20 January 2026 Fourth round	Stranraer	1–1 (a.e.t.) (6–5 p)	Queen's Park	Stranraer
19:45	Plank 59'	Report	Connolly 11'	Stadium: Stair Park; Attendance: 597; Referee: Peter Stuart

8 February 2026 Fifth round	Rangers	8–0	Queen's Park	Glasgow
14:00	Naderi 8', 49'; Tavernier 18', 26', 39' (pen.); Shiels 43' (o.g.); Miovski 80'; Chukwuani 90'	Report		Stadium: Ibrox Stadium; Attendance: 36,190; Referee: Ross Hardie

Notes

1. Following an SFA hearing Stranraer were found to have fielded an ineligible player, therefore, Queen's Park progressed.

=== Glasgow Cup ===
28 June 2025 Group Stage	Clyde	1–0	Queen's Park	Hamilton
15:00	Williamson 40'	Report		Stadium: New Douglas Park

14 October 2025 Group Stage	Queen's Park	1–1 (5–6 p)	Partick Thistle	Pollok
17:00	Sowa 49'	Report	Falconer 61'	Stadium: Lochinch Park

25 November 2025 Group Stage	Queen's Park	0–1	Celtic B	Pollok
14:00		Report	Turley 61'	Stadium: Lochinch Park

3 March 2026 Group Stage	Rangers B	1–1 (4–2 p)	Queen's Park	Milngavie
19:45	Hall	Report	McDonnell	Stadium: Rangers Training Centre

== Player statistics ==
As of 1 May 2026 (UTC)

No.	Pos	Nat	Player	Total		Championship		League Cup		Challenge Cup		Scottish Cup		Glasgow Cup	
No.	Pos	Nat	Player	Apps	Goals	Apps	Goals	Apps	Goals	Apps	Goals	Apps	Goals	Apps	Goals
1	GK	(England) ENG	Calum Ferrie	43	0	36+0	0	3+0	0	1+0	0	3+0	0	0+0	0
2	DF	(Scotland) SCO	Zach Mauchin	0	0	0+0	0	0+0	0	0+0	0	0+0	0	0+0	0
3	DF	(England) ENG	Henry Fieldson	43	3	29+4	3	2+1	0	3+0	0	3+0	0	1+0	0
4	DF	(Scotland) SCO	Euan Murray	39	5	30+0	4	4+0	0	0+1	0	3+0	1	1+0	0
5	DF	(England) ENG	Charlie Fox	18	0	13+0	0	3+1	0	0+0	0	0+0	0	1+0	0
6	DF	(Australia) AUS	Nikola Ujdur	0	0	0+0	0	0+0	0	0+0	0	0+0	0	0+0	0
7	FW	(Scotland) SCO	Louis Longridge	44	0	36+0	0	3+0	0	0+1	0	3+0	0	1+0	0
8	MF	(Scotland) SCO	Roddy MacGregor	36	0	24+2	0	2+2	0	1+1	0	3+0	0	1+0	0
9	FW	(Scotland) SCO	Michael Ruth	20	6	9+7	4	2+2	2	0+0	0	0+0	0	0+0	0
10	MF	(Scotland) SCO	Grant Savoury	20	1	11+4	0	0+0	0	1+1	0	3+0	1	0+0	0
11	MF	(Scotland) SCO	Aidan Connolly	46	5	35+0	4	2+2	0	0+3	0	3+0	1	0+1	0
12	DF	(Scotland) SCO	Carlo Pignatiello	40	0	28+1	0	4+0	0	2+1	0	3+0	0	0+1	0
16	MF	(Scotland) SCO	Ricky Waugh	23	0	4+11	0	1+1	0	3+0	0	0+2	0	1+0	0
17	MF	(Scotland) SCO	Tyrese McDonnell	28	4	8+11	1	2+1	2	1+0	0	1+2	0	2+0	1
20	MF	(Scotland) SCO	Jamie Bradley	13	0	1+5	0	2+1	0	2+0	0	0+1	0	0+1	0
21	MF	(Scotland) SCO	Ross McLean	21	0	5+10	0	0+0	0	2+1	0	0+2	0	0+1	0
22	DF	(Scotland) SCO	Matthew Shiels	47	1	36+0	1	4+0	0	1+2	0	3+0	0	1+0	0
24	MF	(Scotland) SCO	Michael Collie	1	0	0+0	0	0+0	0	0+0	0	0+0	0	0+1	0
25	DF	(Scotland) SCO	Magnus MacKenzie	14	0	8+6	0	0+0	0	0+0	0	0+0	0	0+0	0
26	MF	(Scotland) SCO	Scott Martin	10	0	8+2	0	0+0	0	0+0	0	0+0	0	0+0	0
27	FW	(Scotland) SCO	Callum Smith	17	1	15+2	1	0+0	0	0+0	0	0+0	0	0+0	0
28	FW	(England) ENG	Seb Drozd	24	5	10+4	4	2+1	0	2+1	1	3+0	0	0+1	0
29	MF	(Scotland) SCO	Liam McLeish	18	1	0+15	0	0+0	0	0+1	1	0+2	0	0+0	0
30	GK	(Scotland) SCO	Jack Willis	1	0	0+0	0	1+0	0	0+0	0	0+0	0	0+0	0
31	GK	(Poland) POL	Milosz Sliwinski	4	0	0+0	0	0+0	0	2+0	0	0+0	0	2+0	0
33	DF	(Scotland) SCO	Cole Burke	3	0	0+2	0	0+1	0	0+0	0	0+0	0	0+0	0
35	DF	(Scotland) SCO	Ricki Lamie	14	0	7+4	0	0+0	0	2+0	0	0+1	0	0+0	0
38	MF	(Scotland) SCO	Cole Goldie	1	0	0+0	0	0+0	0	0+1	0	0+0	0	0+0	0
42	DF	(Scotland) SCO	Kyle Rodger	2	0	0+2	0	0+0	0	0+0	0	0+0	0	0+0	0
77	FW	(Bulgaria) BUL	Nikolay Todorov	9	1	5+4	1	0+0	0	0+0	0	0+0	0	0+0	0
Players who left the club during the 2025–26 season
14	FW	(England) ENG	Josh Fowler	26	19	16+0	10	3+1	5	3+0	3	2+0	1	1+0	0
15	DF	(Scotland) SCO	Darryl Carrick	8	0	1+3	0	1+0	0	2+0	0	0+0	0	1+0	0
18	FW	(Scotland) SCO	Aiden McGinlay	7	0	0+1	0	1+2	0	1+0	0	0+0	0	2+0	0
19	FW	(Scotland) SCO	Timam Scott	20	1	1+11	1	2+2	0	2+0	0	0+0	0	1+1	0
23	FW	(Canada) CAN	Josiah Sowa	12	1	0+9	0	0+0	0	0+0	0	0+1	0	2+0	1
26	DF	(Scotland) SCO	Rocco Friel	12	1	2+8	1	0+0	0	2+0	0	0+0	0	0+0	0

== Team statistics ==
=== Championship table ===
Pos	Team	Pld	W	D	L	GF	GA	GD	Pts	Promotion, qualification or relegation
4	Dunfermline Athletic (Q)	36	14	9	13	52	41	+11	51	Qualification for the Premiership play-off quarter-final
5	Raith Rovers	36	12	9	15	43	42	+1	45	
6	Queen's Park	36	9	14	13	35	48	−13	41	
7	Ayr United	36	8	15	13	38	47	−9	39	
8	Greenock Morton	36	8	14	14	36	52	−16	38	

Rules for classification: 1) Points; 2) Goal difference; 3) Goals scored; 4) Head-to head points; 5) Head-to-head goal difference; 6) Play-off (only for deciding promotion, play-off participation and relegation).
(Q) Qualified for the phase indicated

=== League Cup table ===
Pos	Team	Pld	W	PW	PL	L	GF	GA	GD	Pts	Qualification	FAL	COV	QPA	SPA	BRE
1	Falkirk	4	3	1	0	0	14	1	+13	11	Qualification for the second round	—	—	3–1	4–0	—
2	Cove Rangers	4	2	0	1	1	5	2	+3	7		0–0p	—	—	1–0	—
3	Queen's Park	4	2	0	0	2	9	6	+3	6		—	2–1	—	—	5–0
4	The Spartans	4	2	0	0	2	4	6	−2	6		—	—	2–1	—	2–0
5	Brechin City	4	0	0	0	4	0	17	−17	0		0–7	0–3	—	—	—

Rules for classification: 1) goal difference, 2) goals scored, 3) away goals scored, 4) matches won, 5) away matches won, 6) drawing of lots.

== Transfers ==
=== Players in ===
Player	From	Fee
(Scotland) Aidan Connolly	(Scotland) Raith Rovers	Free
(Scotland) Michael Ruth	(Scotland) Dumbarton	Free
(Scotland) Carlo Pignatiello	(Scotland) Dumbarton	Free
(England) Josh Fowler	(United Arab Emirates) Dubai City	Free
(Scotland) Matthew Shiels	(Scotland) Dumbarton	Free
(Scotland) Euan Murray	(Scotland) Raith Rovers	Free
(Scotland) Callum Smith	(Scotland) Raith Rovers	Free
(Scotland) Ricki Lamie	(Scotland) Ross County	Free
(Bulgaria) Nikolay Todorov	(Scotland) Arbroath	Free

=== Players out ===
Player	To	Fee
(Scotland) Zach Balfour	(Scotland) Annan Athletic	Free
(Scotland) Lennon Connolly	(Scotland) Arbroath	Free
(Northern Ireland) Reece Evans	(England) Reading	Free
(Scotland) Alex Fairlie	(Scotland) Beith Juniors	Free
(Scotland) Archie Graham	(Scotland) Stenhousemuir	Free
(Scotland) Rocco Hickey-Fugaccia	(Scotland) Arbroath	Free
(England) Josh Hinds		Free
(Scotland) Cammy Kerr	(Scotland) Livingston	Free
(Scotland) Lucas McCormack		Free
(Scotland) Liam McVey		Free
(Scotland) Lewis Reid	(Scotland) Stranraer	Free
(England) Josh Scott	(England) Darlington	Free
(Scotland) Joseph Smith	(Scotland) Linlithgow Rose	Free
(Scotland) Jack Thomson	(Scotland) Kilmarnock	Free
(England) Max Thompson	(England) Chorley	Free
(England) Jack Turner	(England) Woking	Free
(England) Will Tizzard	(England) Sutton United	Free
(Scotland) Sean Welsh	(Scotland) The Spartans	Free
(Scotland) Zak Rudden	(Scotland) Livingston	Free
(Scotland) Sam Kane	(England) Derby County	Free
(England) Josh Fowler	(Scotland) St Johnstone	Undisclosed

=== Loans in ===
Player	From	Fee
(Scotland) Rocco Friel	(England) Queens Park Rangers	Loan
(Scotland) Scott Martin	(Scotland) Partick Thistle	Loan

=== Loans out ===
Player	To	Fee
(Scotland) Magnus MacKenzie	(Scotland) East Kilbride	Loan
(Scotland) Jamie Bradley	(Scotland) Clyde	Loan
(Scotland) Darryl Carrick	(Scotland) Annan Athletic	Loan
(Scotland) Timam Scott	(Scotland) Annan Athletic	Loan
(Scotland) Aiden McGinlay	(Scotland) Clyde	Loan
(Canada) Josiah Sowa	(Scotland) Annan Athletic	Loan

== See also ==
- List of Queen's Park F.C. seasons
