= 2022 Acrobatic Gymnastics World Championships =

28th Acrobatic Gymnastics World Championships
- Venue: National Gymnastics Arena
- Location: Baku, Azerbaijan
- Start date: 10 March 2022
- End date: 13 March 2022

The 2022 Acrobatic Gymnastics World Championships was held from 10 to 13 March 2022 in Baku, Azerbaijan.

== Medal table ==
* Host nation (Azerbaijan)

Rank	Nation	Gold	Silver	Bronze	Total
1	Belgium	7	2	1	10
2	Portugal	3	4	0	7
3	United States	3	1	2	6
4	Great Britain	2	3	2	7
5	Kazakhstan	1	3	2	6
6	Israel	0	1	3	4
7	Azerbaijan*	0	1	2	3
8	Hungary	0	1	1	2
9	Germany	0	0	2	2
10	Austria	0	0	1	1
Totals (10 entries)		16	16	16	48

Details:

== Medal summary ==
=== Combined ===
Event	Gold	Silver	Bronze
Team	Belgium	Portugal	Great Britain
Men's Pair	United States; Braiden McDougall; Angel Felix	Kazakhstan; Vadim Shulyar; Daniyel Dil	Azerbaijan; Daniel Abbasov; Murad Rafiyev
Women's Pair	Portugal; Rita Ferreira; Ana Teixeira	Hungary; Dorina Bernáth; Noémi Stattner	Kazakhstan; Alexandra Rudakova; Damira Talgat
Mixed Pair	Belgium; Bram Röttger; Helena Heijens	Great Britain; Natasha Hutchinson; Dylan Howells	Germany; Daniel Blintsov; Pia Schütze
Women's Group	Belgium; Kim Bergmans; Lise De Meyst; Bo Hollebosch	Portugal; Beatriz Carneiro; Bárbara da Silva Sequeira; Francisca Maia	United States; Victoria Blante; Eily Corbett; Cassidy Cu
Men's Group	Great Britain; Archie Goonesekera; Andrew Morris-Hunt; Finlay Gray; Bradley Gold	Belgium; Wannes Vlaeminck; Jonas Raus; Viktor Vermeire; Simon De Wever	Israel; Hen Banuz; Lior Borodin; Amir Daus; Tomer Offir

=== Balance ===
Event	Gold	Silver	Bronze
Men's Pair	Kazakhstan; Vadim Shulyar; Daniyel Dil	Portugal; Fábio Beco; Bruno Ramalho	United States; Braiden McDougall; Angel Felix
Women's Pair	Portugal; Rita Ferreira; Ana Teixeira	United States; Katherine Borcherding; Cierra McKown	Kazakhstan; Alexandra Rudakova; Damira Talgat
Mixed Pair	Belgium; Bram Röttger; Helena Heijens	Great Britain; Natasha Hutchinson; Dylan Howells	Germany; Daniel Blintsov; Pia Schütze
Women's Group	United States; Victoria Blante; Eily Corbett; Cassidy Cu	Belgium; Kim Bergmans; Lise De Meyst; Bo Hollebosch	Austria; Larissa Höfler; Paula Sophie Pfurtscheller; Hanna Paic
Men's Group	Belgium; Wannes Vlaeminck; Jonas Raus; Viktor Vermeire; Simon De Wever	Great Britain; Archie Goonesekera; Andrew Morris-Hunt; Finlay Gray; Bradley Gold	Israel; Hen Banuz; Lior Borodin; Amir Daus; Tomer Offir

=== Dynamic ===
Event	Gold	Silver	Bronze
Men's Pair	United States; Braiden McDougall; Angel Felix	Kazakhstan; Vadim Shulyar; Daniyel Dil	Azerbaijan; Daniel Abbasov; Murad Rafiyev
Women's Pair	Portugal; Rita Ferreira; Ana Teixeira	Kazakhstan; Alexandra Rudakova; Damira Talgat	Hungary; Dorina Bernáth; Noémi Stattner
Mixed Pair	Belgium; Bram Röttger; Helena Heijens	Azerbaijan; Aghasif Rahimov; Raziya Seyidli	Great Britain; Natasha Hutchinson; Dylan Howells
Women's Group	Belgium; Kim Bergmans; Lise De Meyst; Bo Hollebosch	Portugal; Beatriz Carneiro; Bárbara da Silva Sequeira; Francisca Maia	Israel; Yarin Ovadia; Meshi Hurvitz; Inbal Zeitounei
Men's Group	Great Britain; Archie Goonesekera; Andrew Morris-Hunt; Finlay Gray; Bradley Gold	Israel; Hen Banuz; Lior Borodin; Amir Daus; Tomer Offir	Belgium; Wannes Vlaeminck; Jonas Raus; Viktor Vermeire; Simon De Wever

== Participating issue ==
Because of Russian invasion of Ukraine, Russia and Belarus were banned, and Ukrainian athletes could not attend due to the war in their country. 9 of the 18 medals (50%) from the previous period (2020 Acrobatic Gymnastics World Championships) went to these three countries.
