= Adam Brown (footballer) =

Scottish footballer (born 1995)

Personal information
- Date of birth: 9 June 1995 (age 31)
- Place of birth: Falkirk, Scotland
- Height: 5 ft 11 in (1.80 m)
- Position: Midfielder

Team information
- Current team: Stirling Albion
- Number: 11

Youth career
- Celtic
- St Mirren

Senior career*
Years	Team	Apps	(Gls)
2014–2015	St Mirren	7	(0)
2015–2018	Airdrieonians	65	(5)
2018–2021	Alloa Athletic	35	(3)
2021–2024	Stenhousemuir	104	(14)
2024–	Stirling Albion	52	(13)
- * Club domestic league appearances and goals as of 5 May 2026

Adam Brown (born 9 June 1995) is a Scottish footballer who plays as a midfielder for Scottish League Two club Stirling Albion. He has also played for St Mirren, Airdrieonians, Alloa Athletic and Stenhousemuir.

== Career ==
Born in Falkirk, Brown started his career in Celtic's youth system before joining St Mirren in 2012. Brown signed a one-year professional contract with St Mirren in May 2014. Brown made his debut for St Mirren starting in a 2–0 home loss against Hamilton Academical in the Scottish Premiership. Brown departed Saints in the summer of 2015, when his contract expired. He left having played seven matches, scoring no goals.

On 25 August 2015, Brown signed for Scottish League One club Airdrieonians.

On 4 June 2018, Brown signed for newly promoted Scottish Championship club Alloa Athletic.

On 31 August 2024, Brown moved to Stirling Albion.

== Career statistics ==
As of match played 23 October 2021

Club statistics
Club	Season	League			Scottish Cup		League Cup		Other		Total	
Club	Season	Division	Apps	Goals	Apps	Goals	Apps	Goals	Apps	Goals	Apps	Goals
St Mirren	2014–15	Scottish Premiership	7	0	1	0	0	0	0	0	8	0
Airdrieonians	2015–16	Scottish League One	12	0	2	0	1	0	0	0	15	0
Airdrieonians	2016–17	Scottish League One	36	4	1	0	4	3	3 (Note: One appearance in the Scottish Challenge Cup and two appearances in the Scottish Championship play-offs)	0	44	7
Airdrieonians	2017–18	Scottish League One	17	1	1	0	3	0	1 (Note: Appearances in the Scottish Challenge Cup)	0	22	1
Airdrieonians	Total		65	5	4	0	8	3	4	0	81	8
Alloa Athletic	2018–19	Scottish Championship	14	0	1	0	4	0	4	0	23	0
Alloa Athletic	2019–20	Scottish Championship	14	3	1	0	3	0	1	0	19	3
Alloa Athletic	2020–21	Scottish Championship	7	0	0	0	2	0	0	0	9	0
Alloa Athletic	Total		35	3	2	0	9	0	5	0	51	3
Stenhousemuir	2021–22	Scottish League Two	10	2	1	2	4	0	2	0	17	4
Career total			117	10	8	2	21	3	11	0	157	15
