= Blair Malcolm =

Scottish footballer (born 1997)

Personal information
- Date of birth: 3 February 1997 (age 29)
- Place of birth: Glasgow, Scotland
- Height: 6 ft 0 in (1.83 m)
- Positions: Midfielder; defender

Youth career
- –2015: Partick Thistle
- 2015–2017: Ross County

Senior career*
Years	Team	Apps	(Gls)
2017–2018	Ross County	1	(0)
2018	→ Cowdenbeath (loan)	19	(2)
2018–2019	Cowdenbeath	31	(1)
2019–2021	Alloa Athletic	12	(0)
2021	East Kilbride		
2022–2023	Albion Rovers	47	(2)
2023–2024	Dumbarton	28	(1)
2024–2025	Forfar Athletic	23	(1)
- * Club domestic league appearances and goals as of 02:09, 31 May 2025 (UTC)

Blair Malcolm (born 3 February 1997) is a Scottish professional footballer who plays as a midfielder.

Malcolm has previously played for Ross County, Cowdenbeath, Alloa Athletic, East Kilbride, Albion Rovers, Dumbarton and Forfar Athletic.

== Career ==
=== Early career ===
Malcolm started his career at Partick Thistle, before moving to Ross County at the start of the 2015–16 season. He extended his contract with Ross County in 2017, after the club won the development league for the first time in their history. On 20 May 2017, Malcolm made his league debut for Ross County against Kilmarnock in a 2–1 victory in which he played the full 90 minutes.

On 17 November 2017, Malcolm signed for Scottish League Two club Cowdenbeath, initially on an emergency loan, which was extended for the remainder of the season in January 2018.

During his loan spell at Cowdenbeath, Malcolm played in both play-off matches against Cove Rangers. Cowdenbeath retained their League 2 status and Malcolm earned a place in the SPFL Team of the Week.

His contract expired in May 2018 following County's relegation to the Championship.

=== Cowdenbeath ===
Malcolm then signed on a permanent basis for Cowdenbeath in June 2018.

=== Alloa Athletic ===
On 2 August 2019, Malcolm joined Alloa Athletic on a free transfer. On 31 August, he made his debut for Alloa in a 1–0 win in the Scottish Championship against Queen of the South.

=== East Kilbride ===
Malcolm signed with East Kilbride on 19 June 2021.

=== Albion Rovers ===
On 3 January 2022, Malcolm signed for Scottish League Two side Albion Rovers on a short-term deal until the end of the 2021–22 season. He left the club following their relegation in May 2023.

=== Dumbarton ===
Malcolm signed for Dumbarton in May 2023 and scored his first goal for the club in a 2-0 win against Bonnyrigg Rose in March 2024. He was a member of the side that won promotion to Scottish League One via the playoffs, before leaving the club in May after one season.

== Career statistics ==
=== Club ===
As of 08:21, 18 May 2024 (UTC)

Appearances and goals by club, season and competition
Club	Season	League			Scottish Cup		League Cup		Other		Total	
Club	Season	Division	Apps	Goals	Apps	Goals	Apps	Goals	Apps	Goals	Apps	Goals
Ross County	2016–17	Scottish Premiership	1	0	0	0	0	0	0	0	1	0
Ross County	2017–18	Scottish Premiership	0	0	0	0	0	0	0	0	0	0
Ross County	Total		1	0	0	0	0	0	0	0	1	0
Ross County U20	2019–20	—			—		—		1 (Note: Appearances in the Scottish Challenge Cup)	0	1	0
Cowdenbeath (loan)	2017–18	Scottish League Two	19	2	0	0	0	0	0	0	19	2
Cowdenbeath	2018–19	Scottish League Two	31	1	3	0	4	0	1	0	39	1
Alloa Athletic	2019–20	Scottish Championship	10	0	0	0	0	0	1	0	11	0
Alloa Athletic	2020–21	Scottish Championship	2	0	0	0	2	0	0	0	4	0
Alloa Athletic	Total		12	0	0	0	2	0	1	0	15	0
Albion Rovers	2021–22	Scottish League Two	14	1	0	0	0	0	0	0	14	1
Albion Rovers	2022–23	Scottish League Two	33	1	2	0	3	0	3	0	41	1
Albion Rovers	Total		47	2	2	0	3	0	3	0	55	2
Dumbarton	2023–24	Scottish League Two	28	1	3	0	0	0	4	0	35	1
Career total			138	6	8	0	9	0	10	0	165	6
