= 2018–19 Raith Rovers F.C. season =

Raith Rovers
2018–19 season
- Chairman: Alan Young
- Manager: Barry Smith (until 4 September); John McGlynn (from 25 September)
- Stadium: Stark's Park
- League 1: 3rd
- Challenge Cup: Second round
- League Cup: Group stage
- Scottish Cup: Fifth round
- Top goalscorer: League: Kevin Nisbet (29); All: Kevin Nisbet (34)
- Highest home attendance: 6,013 vs. Dunfermline Athletic, 19 January 2019
- Lowest home attendance: 479 vs. Aberdeen B, 14 August 2018
- Average home league attendance: 1,555
Home colours	Away colours

The 2018–19 season was Raith Rovers' second consecutive season in the third tier of Scottish football since being relegated from the Scottish Championship via the play-offs at the end of the 2016–17 season. Raith Rovers also competed in the Challenge Cup, League Cup and the Scottish Cup.

== Summary ==
=== Management ===
Raith were led by manager Barry Smith for the 2018–19 season. This was his second season at the club.

On 4 September Smith resigned from his position at the club.

On 25 September, John McGlynn was appointed as the new manager for second spell with the club.

== Results and fixtures ==
Win Draw Loss Postponed

=== Pre-season ===
4 July 2018 Pre-Season Friendly	Raith Rovers	2 – 1	Dunfermline Athletic	Bayview Stadium
19:45	Gillespie 15'; Matthews 36'	Match Report	McCann 20'	Attendance: 701; Referee: Andrew Dallas

=== Scottish League One ===
4 August 2018 League One	Stranraer	1 – 1	Raith Rovers	Stair Park
15:00	Anderson 53'	Raith Report	Buchanan 29'	Attendance: 424; Referee: David Lowe

11 August 2018 League One	Raith Rovers	2 – 0	Stenhousemuir	Stark's Park
15:00	Nisbet 25' (pen.), 77'	Raith Report		Attendance: 1,415; Referee: Mike Roncone

18 August 2018 League One	Raith Rovers	2 – 2	East Fife	Stark's Park
15:00	Nisbet 9' (pen.), 75'	Raith Report	Agnew 27' (pen.), 65'	Attendance: 2,025; Referee: Craig Napier

25 August 2018 League One	Airdrieonians	3 – 4	Raith Rovers	Excelsior Stadium
15:00	Vitoria 7', 84'; Carrick 32'	Raith Report	Buchanan 56', 87', 90+3'; Davidson (red card); Nisbet 90+1'	Attendance: 1,119; Referee: Alan Newlands

1 September 2018 League One	Raith Rovers	4 – 0	Forfar Athletic	Stark's Park
15:00	Nisbet 28'; Vaughan 52', 68'; Duggan 56'	Raith Report		Attendance: 1,447; Referee: Euan Anderson

15 September 2018 League One	Brechin City	1 – 1	Raith Rovers	Glebe Park
15:00	Melingui 87'	Raith Report	Nisbet 65' (pen.)	Attendance: 623; Referee: Scott Millar

22 September 2018 League One	Raith Rovers	1 – 1	Montrose	Stark's Park
15:00	Campbell 57' (o.g.)	Raith Report	Webster 28'	Attendance: 1,534; Referee: Grant Irvine

29 September 2018 League One	Dumbarton	1 – 5	Raith Rovers	Dumbarton Football Stadium
15:00	Gallagher 70'	Raith Report	Vaughan 1'; Nisbet 37'; Flanagan 12', 33'; Buchanan 87'	Attendance: 756; Referee: Steven Reid

6 October 2018 League One	Raith Rovers	1 – 1	Arbroath	Stark's Park
15:00	Nisbet 87'	Raith Report	Linn 79'	Attendance: 2,187; Referee: Craig Napier

20 October 2018 League One	Raith Rovers	2 – 1	Stranraer	Stark's Park
15:00	Nisbet 5', 39'; Murray (red card) 44'	Raith Report	Donnelly 28'	Attendance: 1,285; Referee: Craig Napier

27 October 2018 League One	Forfar Athletic	3 – 2	Raith Rovers	Station Park
15:00	Hilson 15'; Easton 67'; Hill 81'	Raith Report	Matthews 29'; Nisbet 33'	Attendance: 826; Referee: Barry Cook

4 November 2018 League One	Raith Rovers	2 – 1	Brechin City	Stark's Park
15:00	Nisbet 41', 90+2'	Raith Report	Jackson 90+3'	Attendance: 1,495; Referee: Graham Beaton

11 November 2018 League One	East Fife	2 – 1	Raith Rovers	Bayview Stadium
15:00	Smith 76'; Dunsmore 90'; Long (red card) 90+2'	Raith Report	Buchanan 11'	Attendance: 1,726; Referee: David Munro

18 November 2018 League One	Stenhousemuir	1 – 3	Raith Rovers	Ochilview Park
15:00	McGuigan 67'	Raith Report	Armstrong 11', 87'; Crane 58'	Attendance: 797; Referee: John McKendrick

1 December 2018 League One	Raith Rovers	2 – 0	Airdrieonians	Stark's Park
15:00	Nisbet 7'; Buchanan 31'	Raith Report		Attendance: 1,567; Referee: David Lowe

8 December 2018 League One	Montrose	3 – 2	Raith Rovers	Links Park
15:00	Rennie 10'; Johnston 59'; Campbell 79'	Raith Report	Armstrong 3'; Nisbet 74'	Attendance: 784; Referee: Alan Newlands

15 December 2018 League One	Raith Rovers	4 – 2	Dumbarton	Stark's Park
15:00	Armstrong 13'; Nisbet 63'; Murray 88'; Vaughan 89'	Raith Report	Forbes 10'; Paton 20'	Attendance: 1,089; Referee: Barry Cook

22 December 2018 League One	Arbroath	0 – 2	Raith Rovers	Gayfield Park
15:00	Swankie (red card) 45'	Raith Report	Armstrong 19'; Buchanan 37'	Attendance: 1,808; Referee: Lloyd Wilson

29 December 2018 League One	Raith Rovers	1 – 2	East Fife	Stark's Park
15:00	Vaughan 84'	Raith Report	Dunsmore 12'; Currie 44'	Attendance: 2,833; Referee: Gavin Ross

5 January 2019 League One	Raith Rovers	5 – 1	Stenhousemuir	Stark's Park
15:00	Davidson 18'; Gillespie 33'; Murray 38'; Vaughan 40'; Duggan 52'	Raith Report	McBrearty (red card) 21'; Ross 25'	Attendance: 1,398; Referee: Grant Irvine

12 January 2019 League One	Airdrieonians	1 – 1	Raith Rovers	Excelsior Stadium
15:00	McIntosh 9' (pen.)	Raith Report	Murray 73'	Attendance: 1,140; Referee: David Munro

26 January 2019 League One	Brechin City	2 – 1	Raith Rovers	Glebe Park
15:00	Smith 52'; Kavanagh 68'	Raith Report	Nisbet 32'	Attendance: 601; Referee: Euan Anderson

2 February 2019 League One	Raith Rovers	1 – 1	Forfar Athletic	Stark's Park
15:00	Barjonas 34'	Raith Report	Baird 87'	Attendance: 1,406; Referee: Colin Steven

16 February 2019 League One	Raith Rovers	0 – 1	Arbroath	Stark's Park
15:00		Raith Report	Hamilton 27'	Attendance: 1,937; Referee: John McKendrick

23 February 2019 League One	Raith Rovers	4 – 1	Montrose	Stark's Park
15:00	Nisbet 2' (pen.); Murray 33'; Buchanan 55'; McGuffie 82'	Raith Report	Masson 63'	Attendance: 1,289; Referee: Mike Roncone

26 February 2019 League One	Dumbarton	2 – 2	Raith Rovers	Dumbarton Football Stadium
19:45	Forbes 27'; Carswell 33'	Raith Report	Flanagan 19'; Nisbet 90+1'	Attendance: 507; Referee: Alan Newlands

2 March 2019 League One	Stranraer	2 – 2	Raith Rovers	Stair Park
15:00	Turner 9'; Vitoria 22'	Raith Report	McGuffie 48'; Nisbet 56' (pen.)	Attendance: 310; Referee: David Munro

9 March 2019 League One	Raith Rovers	1 – 0	Airdrieonians	Stark's Park
15:00	Gillespie 74'	Raith Report		Attendance: 1,339; Referee: David Dickinson

16 March 2019 League One	Forfar Athletic	2 – 1	Raith Rovers	Station Park
15:00	Hilson 22', 69'	Raith Report	Nisbet 52'	Attendance: 509; Referee: Grant Irvine

23 March 2019 League One	Raith Rovers	4 – 1	Dumbarton	Stark's Park
15:00	Ross Matthews 9'; Buchanan 26'; Nisbet 44', 55'	Raith Report	Gallagher 38'	Attendance: 1,338; Referee: Greg Aitken

30 March 2019 League One	East Fife	1 – 2	Raith Rovers	Bayview Stadium
15:00	Smith 41'	Raith Report	Davidson 87'; Nisbet 89'	Attendance: 1,592; Referee: Steven Kirkland

6 April 2019 League One	Stenhousemuir	1 – 1	Raith Rovers	Ochilview Park
15:00	McGuigan 58'	Raith Report	Buchanan 90+2'	Attendance: 784; Referee: Gavin Duncan

13 April 2019 League One	Raith Rovers	2 – 3	Stranraer	Stark's Park
15:00	McKay 4'; Barjonas 34'	Raith Report	Turner 41'; Cameron 44'; Vitoria 90'	Attendance: 1,204; Referee: Steven Reid

21 April 2019 League One	Arbroath	2 – 2	Raith Rovers	Gayfield Park
15:00	Swankie 30'; Wallace 80'	Raith Report	Nisbet 27', 51'	Attendance: 932; Referee: Alan Newlands

27 April 2019 League One	Raith Rovers	3 – 2	Brechin City	Stark's Park
15:00	Nisbet 27', 36'; Buchanan 68'	Raith Report	Kavanagh 11', 35'	Attendance: 1,266; Referee: Graham Beaton

4 May 2019 League One	Montrose	1 – 1	Raith Rovers	Links Park
15:00	Webster 10'	Raith Report	McGuffie 20'	Attendance: 688; Referee: Lloyd Wilson

=== Scottish Championship Play-Offs ===
7 May 2019 Play-Off Semi-Final Leg 1	Raith Rovers	2 – 1	Forfar Athletic	Stark's Park
19:45	Nisbet 40'; Gullan 63'	Raith Report	Baird 44'	Attendance: 2,007; Referee: Colin Steven

11 May 2019 Play-Off Semi-Final Leg 2	Forfar Athletic	1 – 1 (2 – 3 agg.)	Raith Rovers	Station Park
15:00	Baird 55'; Travis (red card) 58'	Raith Report	Nisbet 40'; Gullan 59' (pen.)	Attendance: 2,152; Referee: Euan Anderson

15 May 2019 Play-Off Final Leg 1	Raith Rovers	1 – 3	Queen of the South	Stark's Park
19:45	McKay 86'	Raith Report	Dykes 17'; Murray 22'; Murray 75' (o.g.)	Attendance: 2,471; Referee: David Munro

18 May 2019 Play-Off Final Leg 2	Queen of the South	0 – 0 (3 – 1 agg.)	Raith Rovers	Palmerston Park
15:00		Raith Report		Attendance: 2,420; Referee: Nick Walsh

=== Scottish Challenge Cup ===
14 August 2018 Round 1	Raith Rovers	3 – 1	Aberdeen U20	Stark's Park
19:45	Wedderburn 15'; Matthews 65'; Nisbet 83'	Raith Report	Anderson	Attendance: 479; Referee: Grant Irvine

8 September 2018 Round 2	Ross County	5 – 0	Raith Rovers	Victoria Park
15:00	Graham 18', 29', 40', 42'; Lindsay 37'	Raith Report		Attendance: 1,232; Referee: John Beaton

=== Scottish League Cup ===
==== Table ====
Pos	Team	Pld	W	PW	PL	L	GF	GA	GD	Pts	Qualification	HOM	INV	COW	COV	RAI
1	Heart of Midlothian (Note: Heart of Midlothian were deducted two points for fielding an ineligible player against Cove Rangers on 18 July 2018.) (Q)	4	3	1	0	0	13	2	+11	9	Qualification for the Second round	—	5–0	5–0	—	—
2	Inverness Caledonian Thistle	4	3	0	0	1	9	8	+1	9		—	—	—	2–0	2–1
3	Cowdenbeath	4	2	0	0	2	5	10	−5	6		—	2–5	—	1–0	—
4	Cove Rangers	4	1	0	0	3	3	5	−2	3		1–2	—	—	—	2–0
5	Raith Rovers	4	0	0	1	3	2	7	−5	1		1–1p	—	0–2	—	—

Rules for classification: 1) goal difference, 2) goals scored, 3) away goals scored, 4) matches won, 5) away matches won, 6) drawing of lots.
(Q) Qualified to the phase indicated

==== Matches ====
15 July 2018 Group C	Raith Rovers	0 – 2	Cowdenbeath	Bayview Stadium
15:00		Raith Report	Sheerin 53', 86'	Attendance: 634; Referee: Steven Reid

21 July 2018 Group C	Raith Rovers	1 – 1 (2 – 4 p)	Heart of Midlothian	Bayview Stadium
15:00	Nisbet 51'	Raith Report	Smith 78'	Attendance: 1,452; Referee: Don Robertson

24 July 2018 Group C	Inverness CT	2 – 1	Raith Rovers	Caledonian Stadium
19:45	Austin 49'; MacKay 87'	Raith Report	Gillespie 61'	Attendance: 1,295; Referee: Colin Steven

28 July 2018 Group C	Cove Rangers	2 – 0	Raith Rovers	Balmoral Stadium
15:00	Park 9'; Masson 76'	Raith Report		Attendance: 327; Referee: Kevin Graham

=== Scottish Cup ===
24 November 2018 Round 3	Queen's Park	0 – 3	Raith Rovers	Hampden Park
15:00		Raith Report	Nisbet 13'; Buchanan 24'; Flanagan 57'	Attendance: 679; Referee: Lloyd Wilson

19 January 2019 Round 4	Raith Rovers	3 – 0	Dunfermline Athletic	Stark's Park
15:00	Vaughan 69' (pen.), 78', 81'	Raith Report	Ashcroft (red card) 55'	Attendance: 6,013; Referee: Bobby Madden

9 February 2019 Round 5	Hibernian	3 – 1	Raith Rovers	Easter Road
15:00	Horgan 22'; Slivka 38'; McNulty 58'	Raith Report	Murray 75'	Attendance: 9,131; Referee: Bobby Madden

=== Fife Cup ===
18 December 2018 First round	Kelty Hearts	1 – 5	Raith Rovers	New Central Park
19:45				Attendance: 500

30 April 2019 Semi-final	Raith Rovers	1 – 2	Dunfermline Athletic	Stark's Park
19:45		Raith Report

== Player statistics ==
=== Squad ===
Last updated 18 May 2019

No.	Pos	Nat	Player	Total		League One		League Cup		Challenge Cup		Scottish Cup	
No.	Pos	Nat	Player	Apps	Goals	Apps	Goals	Apps	Goals	Apps	Goals	Apps	Goals
	GK	(England) ENG	Dean Lyness	12	0	11+1	0	0+0	0	0+0	0	0+0	0
	GK	(Scotland) SCO	Sam McGuff	1	0	0+0	0	0+1	0	0+0	0	0+0	0
	GK	(Scotland) SCO	Robbie Thomson	30	0	22+1	0	4+0	0	0+0	0	3+0	0
	GK	(Scotland) SCO	Kieran Wright	10	0	7+1	0	0+0	0	2+0	0	0+0	0
	DF	(Scotland) SCO	Kyle Benedictus	36	0	29+0	0	4+0	0	0+0	0	3+0	0
	DF	(Scotland) SCO	Callum Crane	30	1	28+0	1	0+0	0	0+0	0	2+0	0
	DF	(Scotland) SCO	Iain Davidson	40	2	33+0	2	3+0	0	1+0	0	3+0	0
	DF	(Scotland) SCO	David McKay	25	1	16+3	1	4+0	0	2+0	0	0+0	0
	DF	(Scotland) SCO	Euan Murray	47	5	37+1	4	4+0	0	2+0	0	3+0	1
	DF	(Scotland) SCO	Ryan Stevenson	8	0	1+3	0	0+0	0	1+3	0	0+0	0
	DF	(Scotland) SCO	Euan Valentine	9	0	1+2	0	3+1	0	0+2	0	0+0	0
	DF	(Scotland) SCO	Jamie Watson	18	0	8+3	0	4+0	0	2+0	0	0+1	0
	MF	(Scotland) SCO	Daniel Armstrong	9	5	9+0	5	0+0	0	0+0	0	0+0	0
	MF	(Scotland) SCO	Jamie Barjonas	19	2	16+2	2	0+0	0	0+0	0	1+0	0
	MF	(Scotland) SCO	James Berry	3	0	0+2	0	0+0	0	0+1	0	0+0	0
	MF	(Scotland) SCO	Kieron Bowie	4	0	1+3	0	0+0	0	0+0	0	0+0	0
	MF	(Scotland) SCO	Tony Dingwall	11	0	8+1	0	0+0	0	0+0	0	1+1	0
	MF	(Scotland) SCO	Nathan Flanagan	39	3	23+11	3	0+0	0	1+0	0	3+1	0
	MF	(Scotland) SCO	Grant Gillespie	37	1	26+3	0	3+0	1	2+0	0	3+0	0
	MF	(Scotland) SCO	Regan Hendry	4	0	4+0	0	0+0	0	0+0	0	0+0	0
	MF	(Scotland) SCO	Ross Matthews	43	3	28+7	2	4+0	0	2+0	1	1+1	0
	MF	(Scotland) SCO	Craig McGuffie	14	3	5+9	3	0+0	0	0+0	0	0+0	0
	MF	(Scotland) SCO	Lewis Milne	20	0	5+9	0	2+1	0	1+1	0	0+1	0
	MF	(Scotland) SCO	Dylan Tait	1	0	0+1	0	0+0	0	0+0	0	0+0	0
	MF	(England) ENG	Nat Wedderburn	43	1	35+1	0	1+1	0	2+0	1	3+0	0
	FW	(Scotland) SCO	Liam Buchanan	42	13	26+11	12	0+1	0	0+1	0	1+2	1
	FW	(Australia) AUS	Chris Duggan	23	2	5+10	2	3+0	0	1+1	0	1+2	0
	FW	(Scotland) SCO	Jamie Gullan	12	0	7+5	0	0+0	0	0+0	0	0+0	0
	FW	(Scotland) SCO	Kevin Nisbet	46	34	37+1	31	4+0	1	2+0	1	2+0	1
	FW	(Scotland) SCO	Lewis Vaughan	13	9	8+4	6	0+0	0	0+0	0	1+0	3
	FW	(Scotland) SCO	Jack Smith	4	0	0+4	0	0+0	0	0+0	0	0+0	0

- Squad numbers are not compulsory in Scottish League One.

=== Disciplinary record ===
Includes all competitive matches.

Last updated May 2018

Nation	Position	Name	League 1		League Cup		Challenge Cup		Scottish Cup		Total	
Nation	Position	Name	Booked	Sent off (straight red)	Booked	Sent off (straight red)	Booked	Sent off (straight red)	Booked	Sent off (straight red)	Booked	Sent off (straight red)
(Scotland)	GK	Robbie Thomson	2	0	0	0	0	0	0	0	2	0
(Scotland)	DF	Kyle Benedictus	7	0	1	0	0	0	1	0	9	0
(Scotland)	DF	Callum Crane	3	0	0	0	0	0	1	0	4	0
(Scotland)	DF	Iain Davidson	7	1	1	0	0	0	0	0	8	1
(Scotland)	DF	Euan Murray	3	1	0	0	0	0	0	0	3	1
(Scotland)	DF	David McKay	2	0	0	0	0	0	0	0	2	0
(Scotland)	MF	Jamie Barjonas	3	0	0	0	0	0	0	0	3	0
(Scotland)	MF	Nathan Flanagan	2	0	0	0	0	0	0	0	2	0
(Scotland)	MF	Grant Gillespie	9	0	0	0	1	0	0	0	10	0
(Scotland)	MF	Ross Matthews	8	0	0	0	0	0	0	0	8	0
(Scotland)	MF	Craig McGuffie	1	0	0	0	0	0	0	0	1	0
(Scotland)	MF	Lewis Milne	1	0	0	0	0	0	0	0	1	0
(England)	MF	Nat Wedderburn	9	0	0	0	0	0	0	0	9	0
(Scotland)	FW	Liam Buchanan	1	0	0	0	0	0	0	0	1	0
(Australia)	FW	Chris Duggan	3	0	0	0	0	0	1	0	4	0
(Scotland)	FW	Kevin Nisbet	6	0	0	0	0	0	0	0	6	0

== Team statistics ==
=== League table ===
Pos	Team	Pld	W	D	L	GF	GA	GD	Pts	Promotion, qualification or relegation
1	Arbroath (C, P)	36	20	10	6	63	38	+25	70	Promotion to the Championship
2	Forfar Athletic	36	19	6	11	54	47	+7	63	Qualification for the Championship play-offs
3	Raith Rovers	36	16	12	8	74	48	+26	60	Qualification for the Championship play-offs
4	Montrose	36	15	6	15	49	50	−1	51	Qualification for the Championship play-offs
5	Airdrieonians	36	14	6	16	51	44	+7	48	

Source: SPFL
Rules for classification: 1) Points; 2) Goal difference; 3) Number of goals scored
(C) Champions; (P) Promoted

=== Division summary ===
Round	1	2	3	4	5	6	7	8	9	10	11	12	13	14	15	16	17	18	19	20	21	22	23	24	25	26	27	28	29	30	31	32	33	34	35	36
Ground	A	H	H	A	H	A	H	A	H	H	A	H	A	A	H	A	H	A	H	H	A	A	H	H	H	A	A	H	A	H	A	A	H	A	H	A
Result	D	W	D	W	W	D	D	W	D	W	L	W	L	W	W	L	W	W	L	W	D	L	D	L	W	D	D	W	L	W	W	D	L	D	W	D
Position	5	2	4	2	2	2	2	2	2	2	2	2	2	2	2	2	2	2	2	2	2	2	2	2	2	2	3	2	3	2	2	2	2	3	3	3

Updated to match(es) played on 4 May 2019. Source:
A = Away; H = Home; W = Win; D = Draw; L = Loss; P = Postponed

=== Management statistics ===
Last updated on 18 May 2019

Name	From	To	P	W	D	L	Win% (Note: Win% is the percentage of matches won rounded to two decimal places.)
Barry Smith	5 August 2017	4 September 2018	10	4	3	3	40.00
John McGlynn	25 September 2018	Present	36	16	10	10	44.44
