= 2023–24 Dumbarton F.C. season =

Dumbarton
2023–24 season
- Chairman: Dr Neil Mackay
- Manager: Stevie Farrell
- Stadium: Dumbarton Football Stadium
- League Two: 4th (Promoted via playoffs)
- League Cup: Group stage
- Scottish Cup: Fourth round (lost to Rangers)
- Top goalscorer: League: Tony Wallace (11); All: Tony Wallace (16)
- Highest home attendance: 2,020 (vs Rangers, 20 January 2024)
- Lowest home attendance: 385 (vs Banks o'Dee, 28 October 2023)
- Average home league attendance: 662
Home colours	Away colours

The 2023–24 season was Dumbarton Football Club's second in Scottish League Two, the fourth tier of Scottish football, having finished second in the division in 2023–24 and lost in the playoffs. The club won promotion back to Scottish League One at the second time of asking via the playoffs.

Dumbarton also competed in the Scottish League Cup, Scottish Cup and Scottish Challenge Cup.

== Story of the season ==
=== May ===
Following the playoff final loss to Annan Athletic the Sons released Joe McKee, Martin McNiff, John Gemmell, Ally Love, Stuart Carswell, Russell McLean and Edin Lynch on May 16. Gregor Buchanan, Kalvin Orsi, Harry Broun and Luca Vata were all offered new deals. The same day the club announced the appointment of Kenny Morrison as their new chief scout. Defender Gregor Buchanan turned down a new deal and left the club on May 26 after more than 160 appearances across two spells with the Sons. Blair Malcolm became the club's first new signing of the summer on May 27, joining from Albion Rovers. A busy day on May 29 then saw the club make four signings; midfielders Callum Wilson, Tony Wallace and Carlo Pignatiello all returned for second spells at the club. And were joined by Mark Durnan who signed from Alloa Athletic. The club's first friendlies were announced on May 31, with Hebburn Town visiting The Rock on July 1 and a trip to face Workington AFC on July 8.

=== June ===
On June 7 three new signings were announced. Defenders Sean Crighton and Greig Young joined from Stenhousemuir and Raith Rovers respectively, along with midfielder James Hilton from Stranraer. Winger Kalvin Orsi also agreed a new deal with the club, snubbing full-time offers from elsewhere. A third friendly of pre-season was announced, with Premiership St Mirren visiting G82 on July 4. In the Scottish League Cup the Sons were drawn in a section with Dundee, Inverness Caledonian Thistle, Airdrieonians and Bonnyrigg Rose. Striker Michael Ruth became the club's ninth new signing of the summer on June 15, signing a year long deal following his departure from Queen of the South. The squad returned for pre-season training on June 17, with goalkeeper Harry Broun signing a new season long deal the same day. On June 23 Mark Durnan was announced as the club's new captain, with Sean Crighton appointed vice-captain.

=== July ===
Friendly action began in July, with Sons suffering a 3-2 defeat to Hebburn Town on July 1. Jinky Hilton and Ross MacLean were on the scoresheet. Three days later the Sons lost 3-0 to Scottish Premiership St Mirren. The pre-season schedule concluded with a 4-0 victory against Workington on July 8 at Borough Park. Ross MacLean, Ryan Blair and Declan Byrne got the goals. With youth academy graduate Luca Vata scoring his first top team goal. The club's Scottish League Cup campaign began with a 2-0 defeat to Airdrieonians with the Diamonds scoring twice in the final four minutes. That was followed by a 2-1 victory against Championship Inverness Caledonian Thistle thanks to goals from Ryan Wallace and Tony Wallace. A 0-0 draw and penalty shootout victory against Bonnyrigg Rose followed, before the campaign concluded with a 3-1 loss to Scottish Premiership Dundee.

=== August ===
Prior to the club's first game of the season defender Matthew Shiels became the club's 10th addition of the summer, joining from Hamilton Academical having previously spent time on loan at the Sons from Rangers in 2019–20. The club's first league game of the season ended in a 1-1 draw with Bonnyrigg Rose on August 5, with Ryan Blair scoring Sons' goal. Another 1-1 draw followed, this time with newly promoted Spartans. Tony Wallace got Dumbarton's goal from the penalty spot. A third 1-1 draw followed, with Sons defeating Kilmarnock B 9-8 on penalties in the Scottish Challenge Cup. The Sons won their first league game on August 19, defeating Forfar Athletic 3-1. David Wilson, Finlay Gray and Ross MacLean got the goals. A 4-2 victory against Stenhousemuir ended the month. Goals from Sean Crighton, Ross MacLean and James Hilton had the Sons 4-0 up at half-time before Matty Aitken's second-half brace.

=== September ===
A third straight win followed to start September, with Sean Crighton scoring an 87th minute winner against East Fife. A week later Michael Ruth scored his first goal for the club in a 3-1 Scottish Challenge Cup defeat to Kelty Hearts. Winger Gregg Wylde left the club on September 12 after making 59 appearances, scoring six times. A first league defeat of the season came against Elgin City on September 16, with a second coming a week later against Peterhead. In the Scottish Cup the Sons were given a home tie against Highland Football League side Banks O' Dee. The month ended with a return to winning ways and a 3-1 success against Stranraer - Tony Wallace, Ryan Wallace and Michael Ruth got the goals.

=== October ===
The first game of October ended in a dominant 4-0 away victory against Clyde - Ryan Wallace, Tony Wallace, Michael Ruth and James Hilton got the goals. A 2-0 defeat away to The Spartans followed. In the second round of the Scottish Cup the Sons secured a dramatic 3-2 victory over Highland Football League Banks O' Dee. After falling 2-0 behind Tony Wallace's penalty and two injury time Michael Ruth strikes secured victory. The Sons were drawn away to Annan Athletic in the third round, with the tie scheduled for November 25.

=== November ===
Both Ruth and Wallace were on target again a week later, with Matthew Shiels and Finlay Gray also scoring in a 4-0 home win against Bonnyrigg Rose. It was confirmed after the game that defender Greig Young would require surgery for a serious injury sustained against Peterhead in September. A third straight victory followed with Kalvin Orsi's first goal in more than two years securing a 1-0 win away to East Fife. Orsi won a penalty for the only goal of the game a week later, a 1-0 success at home to Elgin City. The month ended with a dramatic 5-4 extra time Scottish Cup victory over League One Annan Athletic. Michael Ruth, Ryan Wallace, Finlay Gray and Jinky Hilton got the goals. The Sons were drawn against Rangers in the fourth round.

=== December ===
December opened with a 1-0 defeat to Stenhousemuir thanks to a deflected 87th minute James Berry strike, that left the Sons eight points off the top of the table. Goalkeeper Brett Long was then ruled out for an extended period, after suffering a broken ankle in training. The Sons returned to winning ways a week later, with James Hilton, Matthew Shiels, Finlay Gray and Tony Wallace all on target in a 4-2 away win at Forfar Athletic. The final home game of the year also saw the Sons score four - with an early Tony Wallace penalty making him the first Sons player since Stephen Dobbie in 2006 to score 10 goals prior to Christmas - an own goal and headers from Ryan Wallace and Aron Lynas only enough for a point against bottom of the table Clyde, who netted twice in injury time.

=== January ===
On January 5, goalkeeper Patrick O'Neil returned to the club on a deal until the end of the season with Brett Long ruled out for the rest of the campaign. The Sons fell to defeat in their first game of the new year, losing 2-1 to East Fife at The Rock. Two new signings arrived prior to the meeting with Peterhead on January 9. Goalkeeper Jay Hogarth on loan from Rangers and defender Cian Newbury on loan from Hamilton Academical. Both players made their debut the same day, as the Sons were defeated 3-1. Another new signing arrived on January 12, with striker Marc Kelly joining from East Kilbride. He made his debut the following day in a 1-1 draw with Bonnyrigg Rose, with Carlo Pignatiello getting Dumbarton's goal. On January 15, winger Ross MacLean left the club on a leave of absence after a change in his working circumstances. Three days later Gallagher Lennon, son of former Celtic captain Neil Lennon, joined the club on loan until the end of the season. The Sons exited the Scottish Cup on January 20 with a 4-1 defeat to Rangers in front of a sell-out crowd of 2,020 at The Rock. Matthew Shiels got the goal in his final game for the club before joining Cove Rangers. He officially left the club on January 23, and was joined by forward Declan Byrne - who had started just three games all season. On January 25 captain Mark Durnan and defender Greig Young, both of whom had spent large spells out of the team with injury, agreed new contracts until the summer of 2025. A day later goalkeeper Harry Broun who had made eight appearances joined Johnstone Burgh on loan. A first win of the new year against Elgin City arrived on January 27 courtesy of a Tony Wallace goal. The following week attacker Aaron Healy joined on loan from Queen's Park.

=== February ===
A 1-0 defeat to league leaders Stenhousemuir opened February. That was followed by a 2-2 draw with Forfar Athletic where Sons twice led. Michael Ruth's ninth goal of the season opened the scoring, with Marc Kelly netting his first for the club. A 0-0 draw with The Spartans at home followed on February 13, before a 2-0 defeat to Clyde on February 17. The defeat left the Sons on a run of one win in 10 games, and was only The Bully Wee's third victory of the league season. Later that week striker Ryan Wallace announced his immediate retirement from football, after 58 appearances and 10 goals for the club. The following day top scorer Tony Wallace signed an extended deal until the summer of 2025. He celebrated by scoring the winner in a 2-1 comeback success against Stranraer on February 24. Michael Ruth was also on target, netting his 10th of the season - and helping the club to a first win at home since November.

=== March ===
On March 1 striker James Graham joined on loan from Rangers until the end of the season. He made his debut the following day in a 1-0 victory against Peterhead with Michael Ruth getting the only goal. Back-to-back defeats followed; 5-0 at Stranraer and 3-2 at East Fife. Sons returned to winning ways in style on March 16, moving up to third in the league with a 6-2 away win against The Spartans. Ryan Blair netted twice, both from free-kicks, with Aron Lynas, Michael Ruth also on target and Gallagher Lennon and James Graham netting their first senior goals. A second straight victory followed, 2-0, against Bonnyrigg Rose on March 23, with Tony Wallace and Blair Malcolm getting the goals. The month ended with a 0-0 draw against Stenhousemuir at the Dumbarton Football Stadium.

=== April ===
The first game of April ended in a 2-0 victory against Forfar Athletic at Station Park. Tony Wallace's penalty was added to by a late Carlo Pignatiello strike. A fourth straight clean sheet followed, with Jinky Hilton getting the only goal of the game in a 1-0 success against Clyde. The month ended with back-to-back draws, 0-0 away at Stranraer and 2-2 at home to Elgin City - in a game where Sons came back from 2-0 down, thanks to goals from Michael Ruth and James Graham. Boss Stephen Farrell was named League Two Manager of the Month for April following the unbeaten run.

=== May ===
The regular season ended with a 2-1 defeat to Peterhead on May 4. With David Wilson getting Dumbarton's goal. That resulted in a fourth place finish in League Two, and set up a playoff semi-final meeting with Stirling Albion. All the goals came in the first leg, with Jinky Hilton and Tony Wallace on target in a 2-1 home win - followed by a 0-0 draw at Forthbank Stadium. Sons faced The Spartans in the final. Goals from Tony Wallace and Finlay Gray secured a 2-1 first leg win. With the Sons promoted back to Scottish League One following a 2-2 draw at Ainslie Park on May 17 in front of a crowd of more than 2,200. Michael Ruth netted both goals, taking him to 15 for the season.

== First team transfers ==
- From end of 2022–23 season, to last match of season 2023–24

=== In ===
Player	From	League	Fee
Blair Malcolm	Albion Rovers	Scottish League Two	Free
Callum Wilson	Albion Rovers	Scottish League Two	Free
Tony Wallace	Annan Athletic	Scottish League Two	Free
Carlo Pignatiello	Greenock Morton	Scottish Championship	Free
Mark Durnan	Alloa Athletic	Scottish League One	Free
Greig Young	Raith Rovers	Scottish Championship	Free
Sean Crighton	Stenhousemuir	Scottish League Two	Free
James Hilton	Stranraer	Scottish League Two	Free
Michael Ruth	Queen of the South	Scottish League One	Free
Matthew Shiels	Hamilton Academical	Scottish Championship	Free
Patrick O'Neil	Free Agent		Free
Jay Hogarth	Rangers	Scottish Premiership	Loan
Cian Newbury	Hamilton Academical	Scottish League One	Loan
Marc Kelly	East Kilbride	Lowland Football League	Free
Gallagher Lennon	St Mirren	Scottish Premiership	Loan
Aaron Healy	Queen's Park	Scottish Championship	Loan
James Graham	Rangers	Scottish Premiership	Loan

=== Out ===
Player	To	League	Fee
Stuart Carswell	Clyde	Scottish League Two	Free
Ally Love	Hurlford United	West of Scotland Football League	Free
John Gemmell	Retired	N/A	N/A
Martin McNiff	Drumchapel United	West of Scotland Football League	Free
Joe McKee	Peterhead	Scottish League Two	Free
Edin Lynch	Stenhousemuir	Scottish League Two	Free
Russell McLean	Edinburgh City	Scottish League One	Free
Gregor Buchanan	Stenhousemuir	Scottish League Two	Free
Gregg Wylde	Camelon Juniors	East of Scotland Football League	Free
Matthew Shiels	Cove Rangers	Scottish League One	Free
Declan Byrne	Bonnyrigg Rose	Scottish League Two	Free
Harry Broun	Johnstone Burgh	West of Scotland Football League	Loan
Ryan Wallace	Retired	N/A	N/A

== Fixtures and results ==
Win Draw Loss Upcoming fixture

=== Friendlies ===
1 July 2023	Dumbarton	2 - 3	Hebburn Town	Dumbarton Football Stadium
15:00	James Hilton 15', Ross MacLean 60'		Dean Briggs 5', Olly Martin 28', Amar Purewal 45+2'	Attendance: 221; Referee: Sean Murdoch

4 July 2023	Dumbarton	0 - 3	St Mirren	Dumbarton Football Stadium
19:45		Report	Greg Kiltie 18' 37', OG 45'	Referee: Ross Hardie

8 July 2023	Workington	0 - 4	Dumbarton	Borough Park (Workington)
15:00			Ross MacLean 43', Ryan Blair 45+1', Declan Byrne 82', Luca Vata 89'	Attendance: 338; Referee: John Mulligan

=== Scottish League Two ===
5 August 2023 League Two	Bonnyrigg Rose Athletic	1 – 1	Dumbarton	New Dundas Park
15:00	Luke Mahady 81'	Report	Ryan Blair 4'	Attendance: 682; Referee: Iain Sneddon

12 August 2023 League Two	Dumbarton	1 – 1	The Spartans	Dumbarton Football Stadium
15:00	Tony Wallace 55' (pen.)	Report	Jamie Dishington 90'	Attendance: 465; Referee: Colin Whyte

19 August 2023 League Two	Dumbarton	3 – 1	Forfar Athletic	Dumbarton Football Stadium
15:00	David Wilson 59', Finlay Gray 80', Ross MacLean 88'	Report	Seb Ross 29'	Attendance: 498; Referee: George Calder

26 August 2023 League Two	Stenhousemuir	2 – 4	Dumbarton	Ochilview Park
15:00	Matty Aitken 55' (pen.) 90+7'	Report	Sean Crighton 14', Ross MacLean 29' 30', James Hilton 42' Carlo Pignatiello (yellow card) 75' (yellow-red card) 82'	Attendance: 463; Referee: Duncan Williams

2 September 2023 League Two	Dumbarton	1 – 0	East Fife	Dumbarton Football Stadium
15:00	Sean Crighton 87'	Report		Attendance: 599; Referee: Peter Stuart

16 September 2023 League Two	Elgin City	2 – 0	Dumbarton	Borough Briggs
15:00	Conall Ewan 37', Liam Harvey 64'	Report		Attendance: 677; Referee: Ryan Lee

23 September 2023 League Two	Dumbarton	0 – 1	Peterhead	Dumbarton Football Stadium
15:00	Finlay Gray (yellow card) 82' (yellow-red card) 86'	Report	Hamish Ritchie 85'	Attendance: 514; Referee: Greg Soutar

30 September 2023 League Two	Dumbarton	3 – 1	Stranraer	Dumbarton Football Stadium
15:00	Tony Wallace 28', Ryan Wallace 39', Michael Ruth 56'	Report	Ben Armour 24'	Attendance: 504; Referee: Calum Scott

6 October 2023 League Two	Clyde	0 – 4	Dumbarton	New Douglas Park
15:00		Report	Ryan Wallace 19', Tony Wallace 42' (pen.), Michael Ruth 67', James Hilton 80'	Attendance: 542; Referee: Alex Shepherd

21 October 2023 League Two	The Spartans	2 – 0	Dumbarton	Ainslie Park
15:00	Cammy Russell 64', Bradley Whyte 88'	Report		Attendance: 457; Referee: Daniel Graves

4 November 2023 League Two	Dumbarton	4 – 0	Bonnyrigg Rose Athletic	Dumbarton Football Stadium
15:00	Tony Wallace 11' (pen.), Finlay Gray 26', Michael Ruth 66', Matthew Shiels 68'	Report		Attendance: 578; Referee: Duncan Williams

11 November 2023 League Two	East Fife	0 – 1	Dumbarton	New Bayview
15:00		Report	Kalvin Orsi 4'	Attendance: 626; Referee: Jordan Curran

18 November 2023 League Two	Dumbarton	1 – 0	Elgin City	Dumbarton Football Stadium
15:00	Tony Wallace 67' (pen.)	Report		Attendance: 526; Referee: Alastair Grieve

9 December 2023 League Two	Dumbarton	0 – 1	Stenhousemuir	Dumbarton Football Stadium
15:00			James Berry 87'	Attendance: 484; Referee: Duncan Williams

16 December 2023 League Two	Forfar Athletic	2 – 4	Dumbarton	Station Park, Forfar
15:00	Josh Skelly 30' (pen.), Seb Ross 45+1'	Report	Jinky Hilton 16', Matthew Shiels 45', Finlay Gray 45+3', Tony Wallace 59'	Attendance: 427; Referee: Ryan Lee

23 December 2023 League Two	Dumbarton	4 – 4	Clyde	Dumbarton Football Stadium
15:00	Tony Wallace 8' (pen.), OG 37', Ryan Wallace 72', Aron Lynas 86'	Report	Connor Young 22', Martin Rennie 38' (pen.), Kian Leslie 90', Logan Dunachie 90+3'	Referee: Dan McFarlane

6 January 2024 League Two	Dumbarton	1 – 2	East Fife	Dumbarton Football Stadium
15:00	Michael Ruth 66'	Report	Kieran Millar 31', Brogan Walls 71'	Attendance: 625; Referee: Duncan Williams

9 January 2024 League Two	Peterhead	3 – 1	Dumbarton	Balmoor Stadium
19:45	Rory McAllister 81' 90+1' (pen.), Jack Brown 90+3'	Report	Ryan Wallace 2'	Attendance: 635; Referee: Stewart Luke

13 January 2024 League Two	Bonnyrigg Rose	1 – 1	Dumbarton	New Dundas Park
15:00	Neil Martyniuk 10'	Report	Carlo Pignatiello 49'	Attendance: 788; Referee: Lloyd Wilson

27 January 2024 League Two	Elgin City	0 – 1	Dumbarton	Borough Briggs
15:00		Report	Tony Wallace 45+1'	Attendance: 611; Referee: Duncan Nicolson

3 February 2024 League Two	Stenhousemuir	1 – 0	Dumbarton	Ochilview Park
15:00	Ross Taylor 65'	Report	Ryan Blair (yellow card) 62' (yellow-red card) 74'	Attendance: 657; Referee: Ryan Lee

10 February 2024 League Two	Dumbarton	2 – 2	Forfar Athletic	Dumbarton Football Stadium
15:00	Michael Ruth 13', Marc Kelly 25'	Report	Stuart Morrison 15', Rayan Mohammed 77'	Attendance: 419; Referee: Chris Fordyce

13 February 2024 League Two	Dumbarton	0 – 0	The Spartans	Dumbarton Football Stadium
19:45		Report		Attendance: 389; Referee: Colin Whyte

17 February 2024 League Two	Clyde	2 – 0	Dumbarton	New Douglas Park
15:00	Martin Rennie 14' 67' (pen.) Jordan Allan (yellow card) 30' (yellow-red card) 90+3'	Report		Attendance: 652; Referee: Alistair Grieve

24 February 2024 League Two	Dumbarton	2 – 1	Stranraer	Dumbarton Football Stadium
14:00	Michael Ruth 8' Tony Wallace 23'	Report	Craig Ross 5'	Attendance: 458; Referee: Sean Murdoch

3 March 2024 League Two	Dumbarton	1 – 0	Peterhead	Dumbarton Football Stadium
15:00	Michael Ruth 73'	Report		Attendance: 416; Referee: Duncan Nicholson

5 March 2024 League Two	Stranraer	5 – 0	Dumbarton	Stair Park
19:45	OG 2', Matty Grant 30', Dylan Forrest 34', Ben Armour 45+2', Deryn Lang 88'	Report		Attendance: 331; Referee: George Calder

9 March 2024 League Two	East Fife	3 – 2	Dumbarton	New Bayview
15:00	Nathan Austin 3' 90+3' Brian Easton 56'	Report	Finlay Gray 51', Jinky Hilton 54'	Referee: Scott Lambie

16 March 2024 League Two	The Spartans	2 – 6	Dumbarton	Ainslie Park
15:00	Cammy Russell 28', Bradley Whyte 45'	Report	Ryan Blair 5' 55', Aron Lynas 32', Gallagher Lennon 43', Michael Ruth 64', James Graham 89'	Referee: Steven Kirkland

23 March 2024 League Two	Dumbarton	2 – 0	Bonnyrigg Rose Athletic	Dumbarton Football Stadium
15:00	Tony Wallace 25' (pen.), Blair Malcolm 84'	Report		Attendance: 599; Referee: Jordan Curran

30 March 2024 League Two	Dumbarton	0 – 0	Stenhousemuir	Dumbarton Football Stadium
15:00		Report		Attendance: 668; Referee: Andy Gamble

6 April 2024 League Two	Forfar Athletic	0 – 2	Dumbarton	Station Park, Forfar
15:00		Report	Tony Wallace 52' (pen.), Carlo Pignatiello 83'	Attendance: 616; Referee: Joel Kennedy

13 April 2024 League Two	Dumbarton	1 – 0	Clyde	Dumbarton Football Stadium
15:00	Jinky Hilton 73'	Report		Attendance: 723; Referee: Ross Hardie

20 April 2024 League Two	Stranraer	0 – 0	Dumbarton	Stair Park
15:00		Report		Attendance: 405; Referee: Steven Kirkland

27 April 2024 League Two	Dumbarton	2 – 2	Elgin City	Dumbarton Football Stadium
15:00	Michael Ruth 34', James Graham 89'	Report	Russell Dingwall 20', Ross Draper 27'	Attendance: 576; Referee: Colin Whyte

4 May 2024 League Two	Peterhead	2 – 1	Dumbarton	Balmoor Stadium
15:00	Kieran Shanks 7' Jordon Brown 34' (yellow card) 68' (yellow-red card) 72'	Report	David Wilson 49'	Attendance: 811; Referee: Chris Fordyce

=== Scottish League One Playoffs ===
7 May 2024 Semi-final	Dumbarton	2 – 1	Stirling Albion	Dumbarton Football Stadium
19:45	Jinky Hilton 12', Tony Wallace 85' (pen.)	Report	Dale Hilson 27'	Attendance: 900; Referee: Ross Hardie

11 May 2024 Semi-final	Stirling Albion	0 - 0 (1 – 2 agg.)	Dumbarton	Forthbank Stadium
15:00		Report		Referee: Lloyd Wilson

14 May 2024 Final	Dumbarton	2 – 1	The Spartans	Dumbarton Football Stadium
19:30	Tony Wallace 21', Finlay Gray 29'	Report	Ayrton Sonkur 48'	Attendance: 850; Referee: Steven Kirkland

17 May 2024 Final	The Spartans	2 - 2 (3 – 4 agg.)	Dumbarton	Ainslie Park
15:00	Cammy Russell 2', Blair Henderson 90+3' (pen.)	Report	Michael Ruth 4' 54'	Attendance: 2281; Referee: Grant Irvine

=== Scottish Cup ===
28 October 2023 Second round	Dumbarton	3 - 2	Banks o'Dee	Dumbarton Football Stadium
15:00	Tony Wallace 71' (pen.), Michael Ruth 90+7' 90+12'	Report	Hamish Macleod 5', Garry Wood 52'	Attendance: 385; Referee: Ross Clark

25 November 2023 Third round	Annan Athletic	4 - 5	Dumbarton	Galabank Stadium
15:00	Kai Nugent 48', Dominic Docherty 55', Aidan Smith 73' 100'	Report	OG 5', Ryan Wallace 43', Finlay Gray 88', Michael Ruth 113', James Hilton 118'	Attendance: 387; Referee: Ryan Lee

20 January 2024 Fourth round	Dumbarton	1 - 4	Rangers	Dumbarton Football Stadium
17:30	Matthew Shiels 88'	Report	John Lundstram 35', Cyriel Dessers 41', James Tavernier 78' (pen.), Scott Wright 89'	Attendance: 2,020; Referee: Alan Muir

=== Scottish League Cup ===
==== Matches ====
15 July 2023 Group stage	Airdrieonians	2 - 0	Dumbarton	Excelsior Stadium
15:00	Nikolay Todorov 86', Lewis McGregor 89'	Report		Attendance: 830; Referee: Graham Grainger

18 July 2023 Group stage	Dumbarton	2 - 1	Inverness Caledonian Thistle	Dumbarton Football Stadium
19:45	Ryan Wallace 27', Tony Wallace 50'	Report	Billy McKay 76'	Attendance: 505; Referee: Chris Fordyce

22 July 2023 Group stage	Dumbarton	0 - 0 (4–3 p)	Bonnyrigg Rose Athletic	Dumbarton Football Stadium
15:00		Report

26 July 2023 Group stage	Dundee	3 - 1	Dumbarton	Dens Park
19:45	Zach Robinson 38', 77' (pen.), Diego Pineda 44'	Report	Tony Wallace 41', Mark Durnan (yellow card) 76' (yellow-red card)	Attendance: 1940; Referee: Willie Collum

=== Table ===
Pos	Team	Pld	W	PW	PL	L	GF	GA	GD	Pts	Qualification	AIR	DND	DUM	ICT	BON
1	Airdrieonians	4	4	0	0	0	7	2	+5	12	Qualification for the second round	—	1–0	2–0	—	—
2	Dundee	4	3	0	0	1	5	2	+3	9		—	—	3–1	1–0	—
3	Dumbarton	4	1	1	0	2	3	6	−3	5		—	—	—	2–1	p0–0
4	Inverness Caledonian Thistle	4	1	0	0	3	5	7	−2	3		2–3	—	—	—	2–1
5	Bonnyrigg Rose	4	0	0	1	3	1	4	−3	1		0–1	0–1	—	—	—

Rules for classification: 1) goal difference, 2) goals scored, 3) away goals scored, 4) matches won, 5) away matches won, 6) drawing of lots.

=== Scottish Challenge Cup ===
17 August 2022 Second round	Kilmarnock B	1 – 1 (8–9 p)	Dumbarton	Rugby Park
19:45	Bobby Wales 65'	Report	Carlo Pignatiello 41'	Attendance: 300; Referee: Daniel Graves

9 September 2022 Third round	Dumbarton	1 – 3	Kelty Hearts	Dumbarton Football Stadium
15:00	Michael Ruth 34' Ryan Wallace (yellow card) 73' (yellow-red card) 90+2'	Report	Reece Lyon 11' Botti Biabi 16' 76', Jamie Walker (yellow card) 29' (yellow-red card) 78'	Attendance: 427; Referee: Duncan Williams

== Player statistics ==
As of 08:18, 18 May 2024 (UTC)

=== All competitions ===
#	Position	Player	Starts	Subs	Unused subs	Goals	Red cards (red card)	Yellow cards (yellow card)
6	MF	(Scotland) Ryan Blair	23	13	11	3	1	8
16	GK	(Scotland) Harry Broun	8	0	18	0	0	0
10	FW	(Scotland) Declan Byrne	3	11	6	0	0	0
26	DF	(Scotland) Sean Crighton	45	1	0	2	0	5
5	DF	(Scotland) Mark Durnan	29	0	2	0	1	4
9	FW	(Scotland) James Graham	0	13	2	2	0	2
18	MF	(Scotland) Finlay Gray	32	10	1	6	1	8
10	MF	(Scotland) Aaron Healy	3	7	10	0	0	1
17	MF	(Scotland) James Hilton	25	16	4	7	0	5
31	GK	(Scotland) Jay Hogarth	22	0	1	0	0	0
27	FW	(Scotland) Marc Kelly	4	7	10	1	0	2
28	DF	(Northern Ireland) Gallagher Lennon	21	0	1	1	0	2
1	GK	(Northern Ireland) Brett Long	18	0	4	0	0	1
2	DF	(Scotland) Aron Lynas	27	6	16	2	0	7
11	MF	(Scotland) Ross MacLean	10	13	2	3	0	2
4	DF	(Scotland) Blair Malcolm	26	9	9	1	0	6
21	DF	(Scotland) Cian Newbury	23	0	0	0	0	4
19	GK	(Scotland) Paddy O'Neil	1	0	26	0	0	0
7	MF	(Scotland) Kalvin Orsi	25	12	1	1	0	1
12	DF	(Scotland) Carlo Pignatiello	40	5	0	3	1	6
23	FW	(Scotland) Michael Ruth	39	5	0	15	0	4
22	DF	(Scotland) Matthew Shiels	21	1	1	3	0	6
15	MF	(Scotland) Luca Vata	0	3	37	0	0	0
9	FW	(Scotland) Ryan Wallace	16	10	2	6	1	8
14	MF	(Scotland) Tony Wallace	38	10	1	16	0	6
8	MF	(Scotland) David Wilson	23	15	4	2	0	5
20	MF	(Scotland) Callum Wilson	4	2	7	0	0	0
3	DF	(Scotland) Gregg Wylde	4	2	5	0	0	0
29	DF	(Scotland) Greig Young	10	1	2	0	0	1

=== Captains ===
No.	P	Name	Country	No. games	Notes
5	DF	Mark Durnan	(Scotland)	29	Club captain
26	DF	Sean Crighton	(Scotland)	20	Vice-captain

Last updated: As of match played 17:57, 18 May 2024 (UTC)
Source: Competitive match reports.
Competitive matches only
Matches started as captain only
Country: FIFA nationality; No.: Squad number; P: Position; Name: Player name; No. Games: Number of games started as captain.

== League table ==
Pos	Team	Pld	W	D	L	GF	GA	GD	Pts	Promotion, qualification or relegation
2	Peterhead	36	16	12	8	58	39	+19	60	Qualification for the League One play-offs
3	The Spartans	36	15	13	8	53	43	+10	58	Qualification for the League One play-offs
4	Dumbarton (O, P)	36	16	9	11	56	44	+12	57	Qualification for the League One play-offs
5	East Fife	36	11	11	14	46	47	−1	44	
6	Forfar Athletic	36	9	15	12	38	45	−7	42	

Rules for classification: 1) Points; 2) Goal difference; 3) Goals scored; 4) Head-to-to head points; 5) Head-to-head goal difference; 6) Play-off (only for deciding promotion, play-off participation and relegation).
(O) Play-off winners; (P) Promoted
