= Ricki Lamie =

Scottish footballer (born 1993)

Personal information
- Date of birth: 20 June 1993 (age 33)
- Place of birth: Shotts, Scotland
- Position: Defender

Team information
- Current team: Queen's Park
- Number: 5

Youth career
- –2011: Whitburn B.C.
- 2011–2012: Airdrieonians

Senior career*
Years	Team	Apps	(Gls)
2012–2014	Airdrieonians	27	(0)
2012	→ Bathgate Thistle (loan)		
2012	→ Clyde (loan)	4	(0)
2013–2014	→ Queen's Park (loan)	13	(0)
2014	→ East Stirlingshire (loan)	4	(0)
2014–2018	Greenock Morton	109	(2)
2018–2020	Livingston	47	(1)
2020–2024	Motherwell	80	(3)
2023–2024	→ Dundee (loan)	21	(1)
2024–2025	Ross County	0	(0)
2025	→ Hamilton Academical (loan)	10	(1)
2026–	Queen's Park	17	(0)
- * Club domestic league appearances and goals as of 5 September 2026

Ricki Lamie (born 20 June 1993) is a Scottish professional footballer, who plays as a defender for Queen's Park.

He has previously played for Airdrieonians, Queen's Park, Greenock Morton, East Stirlingshire, Bathgate Thistle, Clyde, Livingston, Motherwell, Dundee, Ross County and Hamilton Academical.

== Career ==
Lamie started his senior career when he moved to Airdrieonians (then called Airdrie United) in 2011 from his youth team Whitburn Boys Club. In his first season with Airdrie's youth team, he won the club's U19 Player of the Year award.

Whilst at Airdrie he had three loan spells at Bathgate Thistle, Clyde and East Stirlingshire.

In the summer of 2014, Lamie signed up with Morton on a short-term contract. This was extended in January, and he signed on again for the 2015–16 season in May 2015.

His contract was again extended in May 2016, this time for one year. After a successful campaign in 2016–17, Lamie signed up for another season.

In June 2018, Lamie signed for Livingston.

On 10 June 2020, Motherwell announced the signing of Lamie on a contract until the summer of 2022.

On 28 January 2022, Lamie signed a pre-contract agreement with fellow Scottish Premiership club Dundee. On 9 April, Lamie would score a last-minute goal against former team Livingston to secure a top-six spot for Motherwell. Lamie would score another key goal for Motherwell the next month, netting a winning goal against Hearts which guaranteed the Steelmen European football the next season. The big goals for Motherwell created questions whether Lamie would join Dundee next season, and Lamie confirmed there was a relegation clause in his pre-contract agreement and stated that things were "still up in the air". On 24 May, Lamie officially signed a new two-year extension with Motherwell.

On 26 August 2023, Lamie joined Dundee on a season-long loan. Lamie made his debut on 2 September and scored his first goal for the club in the same game. On 23 February 2024, Lamie signed a pre-contract agreement with Dundee for a second time. However, the agreement would fall apart once again and Dundee announced that Lamie would depart the club in June 2024.

On 1 July 2024, Lamie joined Scottish Premiership club Ross County on a two-year deal. Lamie made his debut for the Staggies on 13 July in a win over Stranraer in the Scottish League Cup group stage. On 23 January 2025, Lamie joined Scottish Championship club Hamilton Academical on loan for the remainder of the season. He made his debut for the Accies two days later, starting in an away league defeat to his former club Livingston. On 15 February, Lamie scored his first goal for Hamilton in an away victory at Hampden over Queen's Park. On 27 June 2025, Lamie departed Ross County.

After an attempt to sign permanently with Hamilton Academical failed after 5 months amid the club's stint in administration, in January 2026 Lamie joined Scottish Championship club Queen's Park on a short-term deal until the end of the season. On 28 May 2026, Lamie signed a new deal with the Spiders to stay with the club for the next season.

== Career statistics ==
As of 5 September 2026

Appearances and goals by club, season and competition
Club	Season	League			Scottish Cup		League Cup		Other		Total	
Club	Season	Division	Apps	Goals	Apps	Goals	Apps	Goals	Apps	Goals	Apps	Goals
Airdrieonians (Note: Airdrie United changed name to Airdrieonians in June 2013)	2011–12	Scottish Second Division	10	0	0	0	0	0	2 (Note: Appearances in the Scottish First Division play-offs)	0	12	0
Airdrieonians	2012–13	Scottish First Division	17	0	0	0	0	0	0	0	17	0
Airdrieonians	2013–14	Scottish League One	0	0	0	0	0	0	0	0	0	0
Airdrieonians	Total		27	0	0	0	0	0	2	0	29	0
Clyde (loan)	2012–13	Scottish Third Division	4	0	0	0	0	0	0	0	4	0
Queen's Park (loan)	2013–14	Scottish League Two	13	0	3	1	0	0	0	0	16	1
East Stirlingshire (loan)	2013–14	Scottish League Two	4	0	0	0	0	0	0	0	4	0
Greenock Morton	2014–15	Scottish League One	29	0	3	0	2	0	3 (Note: Appearances in the Scottish Challenge Cup)	0	37	0
Greenock Morton	2015–16	Scottish Championship	19	0	3	0	3	0	0	0	25	0
Greenock Morton	2016–17	Scottish Championship	28	1	3	0	4	0	2 (Note: Appearances in the Scottish Premiership play-offs)	0	37	1
Greenock Morton	2017–18	Scottish Championship	33	1	1	0	2	0	0	0	36	1
Greenock Morton	Total		109	2	7	0	11	0	5	0	132	2
Livingston	2018–19	Scottish Premiership	25	0	1	0	4	0	0	0	30	0
Livingston	2019–20	Scottish Premiership	22	1	2	0	6	3	0	0	30	4
Livingston	Total		47	1	3	0	10	3	0	0	60	4
Motherwell	2020–21	Scottish Premiership	31	0	3	1	1	0	3 (Note: Appearances in the UEFA Europa League)	0	38	1
Motherwell	2021–22	Scottish Premiership	25	3	2	0	5	1	0	0	32	4
Motherwell	2022–23	Scottish Premiership	24	0	1	0	2	0	2 (Note: Appearances in the UEFA Europa Conference League)	0	29	0
Motherwell	2023–24	Scottish Premiership	0	0	0	0	1	0	0	0	1	0
Motherwell	Total		80	3	6	1	9	1	5	0	100	5
Dundee (loan)	2023–24	Scottish Premiership	21	1	0	0	0	0	0	0	21	1
Ross County	2024–25	Scottish Premiership	0	0	0	0	3	0	0	0	3	0
Hamilton Academical (loan)	2024–25	Scottish Championship	10	1	1	0	0	0	0	0	11	1
Queen's Park	2025–26	Scottish Championship	12	0	1	0	0	0	2	0	15	0
Queen's Park	2026–27	Scottish Championship	5	0	0	0	3	0	0	0	8	0
Queen's Park	Total		17	0	1	0	3	0	2	0	23	0
Career total			332	8	21	2	36	4	14	0	401	14

== Personal life ==
Lamie was found to be the fittest player in the SFL in 2013.

== Honours ==
Morton

- Scottish League One: Winners 2014–15

== See also ==
- Greenock Morton F.C. season 2014–15 | 2015–16
