= 2019–20 Alloa Athletic F.C. season =

Alloa Athletic
2019–20 season
- Chairman: Mike Mulraney
- Manager: Peter Grant
- Stadium: Recreation Park
- Scottish Championship: 8th
- Scottish Cup: Fourth round
- League Cup: Group stage
- Challenge Cup: Fourth Round

The 2019–20 season is Alloa Athletic's 2nd consecutive season in the Scottish Championship. Alloa also competed in the Challenge Cup, League Cup and the Scottish Cup.

== Competitions ==
| Win | Draw | Loss |

=== Scottish Championship ===
==== League table ====
| Pos | Team | Pld | W | D | L | GF | GA | GD | Pts | PPG | Promotion, qualification or relegation (Note: All play-off matches were cancelled, as clubs voted to curtail the season due to the COVID-19 pandemic in Scotland.) |
|---|---|---|---|---|---|---|---|---|---|---|---|
| 6 | Dunfermline Athletic | 28 | 10 | 7 | 11 | 41 | 36 | +5 | 37 | 1.32 | |
| 7 | Greenock Morton | 28 | 10 | 6 | 12 | 45 | 52 | −7 | 36 | 1.29 | |
| 8 | Alloa Athletic | 28 | 7 | 10 | 11 | 33 | 43 | −10 | 31 | 1.11 | |
| 9 | Queen of the South | 28 | 7 | 7 | 14 | 28 | 40 | −12 | 28 | 1.00 | |
| 10 | Partick Thistle (R) | 27 | 6 | 8 | 13 | 32 | 47 | −15 | 26 | 0.96 | Relegation to League One |

Source: SPFL
Rules for classification: 1) Points per game.
(R) Relegated

==== Results ====
| Win | Draw | Loss |

| Date | Opponent | Venue | Result | Scorers | Attendance | Referee | Ref. |
|---|---|---|---|---|---|---|---|
| 3 August 2019 – 15:00 | Partick Thistle | Home | 1–1 | Hetherington | 1,672 | Walsh | |
| 10 August 2019 – 15:00 | Greenock Morton | Away | 1–4 | Cawley | 1,646 | Ross | |
| 24 August 2019 – 15:00 | Arbroath | Away | 0–1 | — | 661 | Steven | |
| 31 August 2019 – 15:00 | Queen of the South | Away | 1–0 | Trouten | 1,294 | Duncan | |
| 14 September 2019 – 15:00 | Dundee | Away | 1–2 | Dick | 4,453 | Newlands | |
| 21 September 2019 – 15:00 | Ayr United | Home | 1–4 | O'Hara | 902 | Lowe | |
| 28 September 2019 – 15:00 | Dunfermline Athletic | Away | 1–1 | Brown | 3,496 | Steven | |
| 4 October 2019 – 15:00 | Dundee United | Home | 1–0 | O'Hara | 1,717 | Aitken | |
| 19 October 2019 – 15:00 | Inverness | Away | 2–2 | Buchanan, Trouten | 2,036 | Roncone | |
| 26 October 2019 – 15:00 | Queen of the South | Home | 2–2 | Trouten, O'Hara | 875 | Lowe | |
| 29 October 2019 – 19:45 | Dundee | Home | 0–3 | — | 1,218 | Cook | |
| 2 November 2019 – 15:00 | Arbroath | Away | 1–2 | Trouten | 921 | Beaton | |
| 9 November 2019 – 15:00 | Dunfermline Athletic | Away | 2–1 | Trouten, Cawley | 1,602 | Napier | |
| 26 November 2019 – 15:00 | Partick Thistle | Away | 1–1 | Trouten | 1,714 | Munro | |
| 30 November 2019 – 15:00 | Inverness Caledonian Thistle | Home | 0–2 | — | 721 | Aitken | |
| 7 December 2019 – 15:00 | Dundee United | Away | 1–2 | Reynolds (o.g.) | 7,615 | Dallas | |
| 14 December 2019 – 15:00 | Ayr United | Away | 1–2 | O'Hara | 1,117 | Munro | |
| 21 December 2019 – 15:00 | Greenock Morton | Home | 0–2 | — | 727 | Clancy | |
| 28 December 2019 – 15:00 | Dunfermline Athletic | Away | 3–1 | Brown, O'Hara, Flannigan (pen.) | 4,257 | Reid | |
| 4 January 2020 – 15:00 | Partick Thistle | Home | 1–1 | Brown | 1,827 | Munro | |
| 21 January 2020 – 19:45 | Arbroath | Home | 2–0 | O'Hara (2) | 765 | Napier | |
| 25 January 2020 – 15:00 | Queen of the South | Away | 3–2 | O'Hara (2), Thomson | 1,169 | Duncan | |
| 1 February 2020 – 15:00 | Inverness Caledonian Thistle | Away | 1–1 | Flannigan (pen.) | 1,914 | Clancy | |
| 14 February 2020 – 19:05 | Dundee United | Home | 0–0 | — | 1,442 | McLean | |
| 22 February 2020 – 15:00 | Greenock Morton | Away | 4–4 | Trouten, Cawley, O'Hara, Deas | 1,214 | Beaton | |
| 29 February 2020 – 15:00 | Ayr United | Home | 0–2 | — | 915 | Aitken | |
| 3 March 2020 – 19:45 | Dundee | Away | 0–0 | — | 4,356 | Roncone | |
| 7 March 2020 – 15:00 | Inverness Caledonian Thistle | Home | 2–0 | Connelly, Trouten | 712 | Kirkland | |

=== Scottish Cup ===
| Date | Round | Opponent | Venue | Result | Scorers | Attendance | Referee | Ref. |
|---|---|---|---|---|---|---|---|---|
| 23 November 2019 – 15:00 | Third round | Elgin City | Away | 3–1 | Taggart, Cawley, O'Hara | 668 | Lambie | |
| 18 January 2020 – 15:00 | Fourth round | Inverness Caledonian Thistle | Home | 2–3 | Cawley, O'Hara | 590 | Collum | |

=== Challenge Cup ===
| Date | Round | Opponent | Venue | Result | Scorers | Attendance | Ref. |
|---|---|---|---|---|---|---|---|
| 7 September 2019 – 15:00 | Third round | Dunfermline Athletic | Away | 1–2 | Robert Thomson, Trouten | 1,448 | |
| 12 October 2019 – 15:00 | Fourth round | Inverness | Away | 3–0 | | 973 | |

=== League Cup ===
| Date | Round | Opponent | Venue | Result | Scorers | Attendance | Ref. |
|---|---|---|---|---|---|---|---|
| 16 July 2019 – 19:45 | Group stage | Elgin City | Home | 3–3 (Elgin win 5–6 on pens) | Trouten, Buchanan, Cawley | 316 | |
| 20 July 2019 – 15:00 | Group stage | Hibernian | Away | 3–0 | | 5,470 | |
| 23 July 2019 – 19:45 | Group stage | Stirling Albion | Home | 2–1 | O'Hara, Buchanan | 412 | |
| 27 July 2019 – 15:00 | Group stage | Arbroath | Away | 2–3 | Buchanan, Trouten (2) | 590 | |

| Pos | Team | Pld | W | PW | PL | L | GF | GA | GD | Pts | Qualification |
|---|---|---|---|---|---|---|---|---|---|---|---|
| 1 | Hibernian | 4 | 3 | 1 | 0 | 0 | 8 | 1 | +7 | 11 | Qualification for the Second Round |
| 2 | Alloa Athletic | 4 | 2 | 0 | 1 | 1 | 8 | 8 | 0 | 7 | |
| 3 | Arbroath | 4 | 2 | 0 | 0 | 2 | 10 | 8 | +2 | 6 | |
| 4 | Elgin City | 4 | 1 | 1 | 0 | 2 | 7 | 7 | 0 | 5 | |
| 5 | Stirling Albion | 4 | 0 | 0 | 1 | 3 | 3 | 12 | −9 | 1 | |

Rules for classification: 1) goal difference, 2) goals scored, 3) away goals scored, 4) matches won, 5) away matches won, 6) drawing of lots.

== Player details ==
As of 3 August 2019

| No. | Pos | Nat | Player | Total | | Scottish Championship | | Scottish Cup | | League Cup | | Challenge Cup | |
| No. | Pos | Nat | Player | Apps | Goals | Apps | Goals | Apps | Goals | Apps | Goals | Apps | Goals |
|---|---|---|---|---|---|---|---|---|---|---|---|---|---|
| 1 | GK | (Scotland) | Neil Parry | 1 | 0 | 1 | 0 | 0 | 0 | 0 | 0 | 0 | 0 |
| 2 | DF | (Scotland) | Scott Taggart | 1 | 0 | 1 | 0 | 0 | 0 | 0 | 0 | 0 | 0 |
| 3 | DF | (Scotland) | Liam Dick | 1 | 0 | 1 | 0 | 0 | 0 | 0 | 0 | 0 | 0 |
| 4 | DF | (Scotland) | Robbie Deas | 0 | 0 | 0 | 0 | 0 | 0 | 0 | 0 | 0 | 0 |
| 5 | DF | (Scotland) | Andy Graham (C) | 1 | 0 | 1 | 0 | 0 | 0 | 0 | 0 | 0 | 0 |
| 6 | MF | (England) | Steven Hetherington | 1 | 1 | 1 | 1 | 0 | 0 | 0 | 0 | 0 | 0 |
| 7 | FW | (Scotland) | Kevin Cawley | 1 | 0 | 1 | 0 | 0 | 0 | 0 | 0 | 0 | 0 |
| 8 | MF | (Scotland) | Jon Robertson | 1 | 0 | 1 | 0 | 0 | 0 | 0 | 0 | 0 | 0 |
| 9 | FW | (Scotland) | Liam Buchanan | 1 | 0 | 1 | 0 | 0 | 0 | 0 | 0 | 0 | 0 |
| 10 | FW | (Scotland) | Alan Trouten | 1 | 0 | 1 | 0 | 0 | 0 | 0 | 0 | 0 | 0 |
| 11 | MF | (Scotland) | Iain Flannigan | 1 | 0 | 1 | 0 | 0 | 0 | 0 | 0 | 0 | 0 |
| 14 | MF | (Scotland) | Adam Brown | 0 | 0 | 0 | 0 | 0 | 0 | 0 | 0 | 0 | 0 |
| 16 | DF | (Scotland) | Nathan Gilhooley | 0 | 0 | 0 | 0 | 0 | 0 | 0 | 0 | 0 | 0 |
| 17 | FW | (Scotland) | Kevin O'Hara | 1 | 0 | 1 | 0 | 0 | 0 | 0 | 0 | 0 | 0 |
| 18 | MF | (Scotland) | Blair Malcolm | 0 | 0 | 0 | 0 | 0 | 0 | 0 | 0 | 0 | 0 |
| 19 | FW | (Scotland) | Robert Thomson | 1 | 0 | 1 | 0 | 0 | 0 | 0 | 0 | 0 | 0 |
| 20 | DF | (Scotland) | Cameron O'Donnell | 0 | 0 | 0 | 0 | 0 | 0 | 0 | 0 | 0 | 0 |
| 23 | MF | (Scotland) | Paul Gillespie | 0 | 0 | 0 | 0 | 0 | 0 | 0 | 0 | 0 | 0 |
| 31 | GK | (Scotland) | Chris Henry | 0 | 0 | 0 | 0 | 0 | 0 | 0 | 0 | 0 | 0 |
| 41 | GK | (Scotland) | Jamie MacDonald | 0 | 0 | 0 | 0 | 0 | 0 | 0 | 0 | 0 | 0 |
Players who left the club during the season:
| 22 | MF | (Scotland) | Andy Stirling | 1 | 0 | 1 | 0 | 0 | 0 | 0 | 0 | 0 | 0 |

== Transfers ==
=== Transfers in ===
| Date from | Position | Name | From | Fee | Ref. |
|---|---|---|---|---|---|
| 1 July 2019 | FW | Liam Buchanan | Raith Rovers | Free transfer | |
| 1 July 2019 | MF | Andy Stirling | Queen of the South | Free transfer | |
| 1 July 2019 | FW | Robert Thomson | Greenock Morton | Free transfer | |
| 15 July 2019 | FW | Kevin O'Hara | Falkirk | Free transfer | |
| 2 August 2019 | MF | Blair Malcolm | Cowdenbeath | Free transfer | |

=== Transfers out ===
| Date | Position | Name | To | Fee | Ref. |
|---|---|---|---|---|---|
| 1 July 2019 | MF | Jordan Kirkpatrick | Forfar Athletic | Free transfer | |
| 1 July 2019 | MF | Reis Peggie | East Stirlingshire | Free transfer | |
| 1 July 2019 | FW | Ahmed Aloulou | Released | | |
| 1 July 2019 | MF | Jim Goodwin | Retired | | |
| 1 July 2019 | DF | Zdravko Karadachki | Released | | |
| 2 September 2019 | MF | Andy Stirling | Released | | |

=== Loans in ===
| Date | Position | Name | From | End date | Ref. |
|---|---|---|---|---|---|
| 8 August 2019 | DF | Robbie Deas | Celtic Reserves | End of season | |
| 13 September 2019 | GK | Jamie MacDonald | Kilmarnock | 31 December 2019 | |

== See also ==
- 2019–20 in Scottish football
