= Innes Murray =

Scottish footballer (born 1998)

Personal information
- Date of birth: 17 February 1998 (age 28)
- Place of birth: Edinburgh, Scotland
- Height: 5 ft 11 in (1.80 m)
- Position: Midfielder

Team information
- Current team: Kelty Hearts
- Number: 10

Youth career
- –2016: Celtic
- 2016–2017: Hibernian

Senior career*
Years	Team	Apps	(Gls)
2017–2022	Hibernian	0	(0)
2017–2018	→ Stenhousemuir (loan)	19	(2)
2020	→ Airdrieonians (loan)	5	(0)
2020–2021	→ Alloa Athletic (loan)	16	(3)
2021–2022	→ Edinburgh City (loan)	31	(5)
2022–2023	Edinburgh City	0	(0)
2023–2025	Arbroath	41	(5)
2025–	Kelty Hearts	34	(4)
- * Club domestic league appearances and goals as of 4 May 2026

Innes Murray (born 17 February 1998) is a Scottish footballer who plays as a midfielder for Scottish League Two club Kelty Hearts. He has previously played for Hibernian, Stenhousemuir, Airdrieonians, Alloa Athletic, Edinburgh City and Arbroath.

== Career ==
=== Hibernian ===
Born in Edinburgh, Murray played youth football with Celtic, before joining Hibernian in August 2016. He joined Stenhousemuir on loan in August 2017, with that loan later extended until the end of the season. He appeared in nineteen league matches for Stenhousemuir and scored twice.

On 31 January 2020, he joined Scottish League One side Airdrieonians on loan, He made his debut for the club on 8 February 2020 in a 0–0 draw away to Dumbarton, and appeared a further four times during the 2019–20 season before it was curtailed due to the COVID-19 pandemic.

He joined Scottish Championship side Alloa Athletic on a season-long loan in September 2020. His first appearance for them came on 10 October 2020 in a 2–1 Scottish League Cup defeat to Livingston.

Murray was loaned to Edinburgh City in August 2021. He was released by Hibs in June 2022, at the end of his contract.

=== Edinburgh City ===
Following his release by Hibs, Murray signed a two-year contract with Edinburgh.

=== Arbroath ===
Murray then signed for Abroath in the Scottish Championship in December 2023. Murray was a part of the Red Lichties side which won the Scottish League One to return to the Championship before leaving in 2025.

=== Kelty Hearts ===
On 9 May 2025, Murray signed a pre-contract agreement with Scottish League One club Kelty Hearts for the following season.

== Career statistics ==
As of match played 4 September 2021

Appearances and goals by club, season and competition
Club	Season	League			Cup		League Cup		Other		Total	
Club	Season	Division	Apps	Goals	Apps	Goals	Apps	Goals	Apps	Goals	Apps	Goals
Hibernian	2017–18	Scottish Premiership	0	0	0	0	0	0	—		0	0
Hibernian	2018–19	Scottish Premiership	0	0	0	0	0	0	—		0	0
Hibernian	2019–20	Scottish Premiership	0	0	0	0	0	0	—		0	0
Hibernian	2020–21	Scottish Premiership	0	0	0	0	0	0	—		0	0
Hibernian	2021–22	Scottish Premiership	0	0	0	0	0	0	—		0	0
Hibernian	Total		0	0	0	0	0	0	0	0	0	0
Hibernian U21	2018–19	—			—		—		1 (Note: Appearances in Scottish Challenge Cup)	0	1	0
Hibernian U21	2021–22	—			—		—		1	0	1	0
Hibernian U21	Total		0	0	0	0	0	0	2	0	2	0
Stenhousemuir (loan)	2017–18	Scottish League Two	19	2	0	0	0	0	3 (Note: Appearances in League One Play-offs)	0	22	2
Airdrieonians (loan)	2020–21	Scottish League One	5	0	0	0	0	0	—		5	0
Alloa Athletic (loan)	2020–21	Scottish Championship	16	3	1	0	4	0	—		21	3
Edinburgh City (loan)	2021–22	Scottish League Two	1	0	0	0	0	0	—		1	0
Career total			41	5	1	0	4	0	5	0	51	5
