= Henry Fieldson =

English footballer (born 2005)

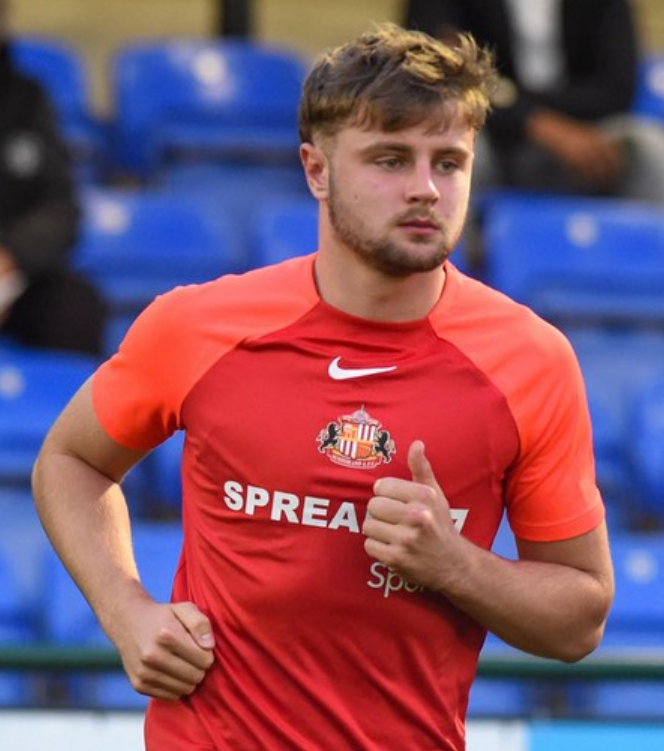
- Fieldson playing for Sunderland academy, 2023

Personal information
- Full name: Henry Boyd Fieldson
- Date of birth: 4 July 2005 (age 21)
- Place of birth: North Shields, England
- Position: Centre-back

Team information
- Current team: St Mirren
- Number: 53

Youth career
- –2023: Sunderland

Senior career*
Years	Team	Apps	(Gls)
2023–2024	Sunderland	0	(0)
2024–2026	Queen's Park	48	(3)
2026–	St Mirren	7	(0)

International career
2026–	Scotland U21	2	(0)
- * Club domestic league appearances and goals as of October 11th 2026

Henry Fieldson (born 4 July 2005) is an English professional footballer who plays as a centre-back for Scottish Premiership club St Mirren.

He is a product of the Sunderland Academy.

== Career statistics ==
As of match played 18 October 2025

Appearances and goals by club, season and competition
Club	Season	League			Scottish Cup		Scottish League Cup		Other		Total	
Club	Season	Division	Apps	Goals	Apps	Goals	Apps	Goals	Apps	Goals	Apps	Goals
Queen's Park	2024–25	Scottish Championship	15	0	1	0	1	0	2 (Note: Appearance(s) in Scottish Challenge Cup)	0	19	0
Queen's Park	2025–26	Scottish Championship	11	0	0	0	3	0	0	0	14	0
Career total			26	0	1	0	4	0	2	0	33	0
