= Euan Murray (footballer) =

Scottish footballer (born 1994)

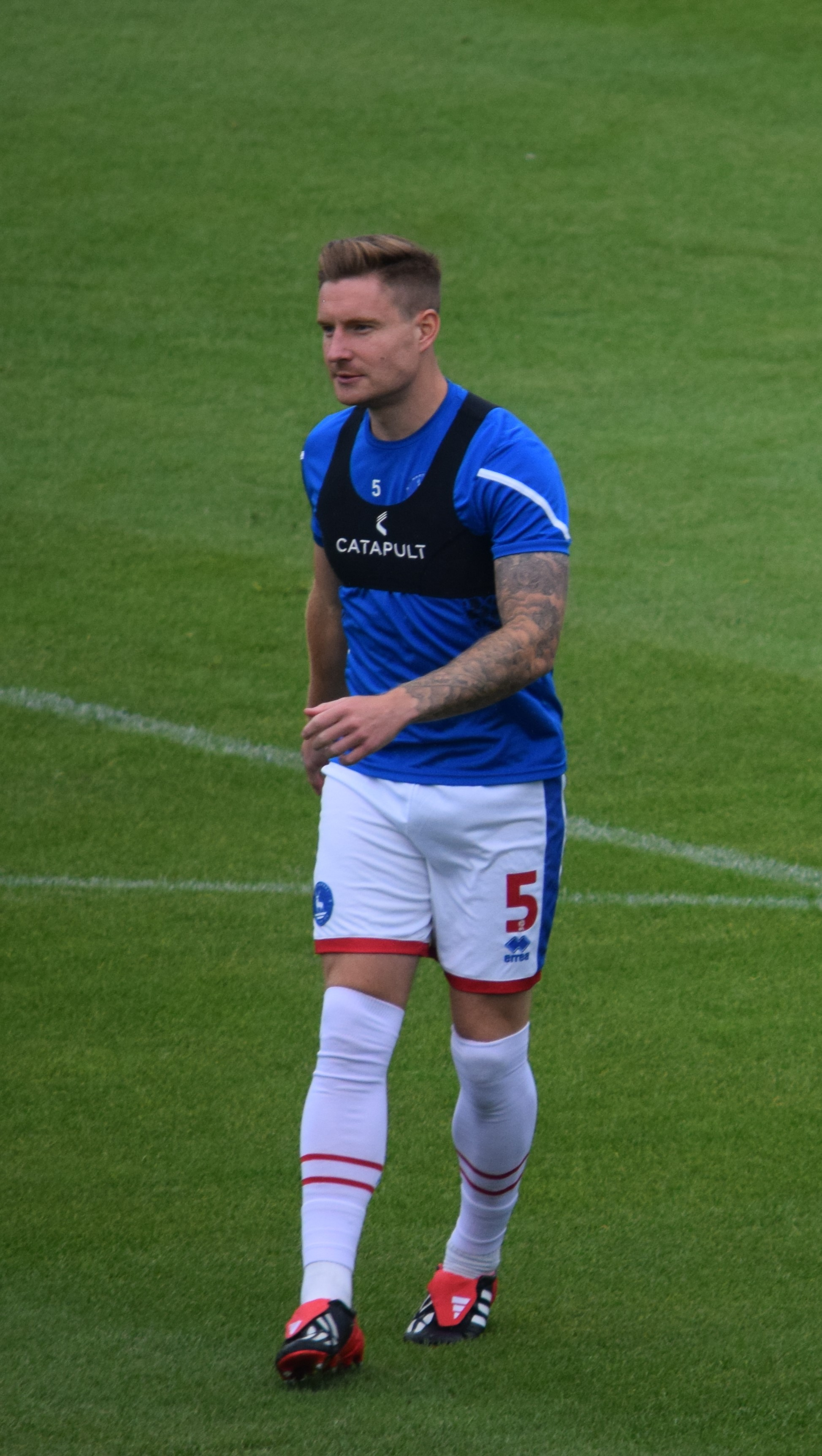
- Murray warming up for Hartlepool United in 2022

Personal information
- Full name: Euan Murray
- Date of birth: 20 January 1994 (age 32)
- Place of birth: Rutherglen, Scotland
- Height: 6 ft 1 in (1.85 m)
- Positions: Defender; defensive midfielder

Team information
- Current team: Queen's Park
- Number: 4

Youth career
- Motherwell

Senior career*
Years	Team	Apps	(Gls)
2011–2014	Motherwell	3	(0)
2014	Arbroath (trialist)	1	(0)
2014	Clyde	6	(1)
2015	Western United	5	(1)
2015–2016	Stenhousemuir	28	(3)
2016–2017	Barrow	6	(0)
2017	Southport	12	(0)
2017–2019	Raith Rovers	68	(7)
2019–2021	Dunfermline Athletic	34	(5)
2021–2022	Kilmarnock	28	(0)
2022–2023	Hartlepool United	29	(0)
2023–2025	Raith Rovers	48	(1)
2025–	Queen's Park	30	(4)

International career
2012	Scotland U18	2	(0)
- * Club domestic league appearances and goals as of 00:46, 22 May 2026

Euan Murray (born 20 January 1994) is a Scottish footballer who plays as a defender for Queen’s Park.

He began his career at Motherwell and has also played for Arbroath, Clyde, Stenhousemuir, Dunfermline Athletic, Kilmarnock and Raith Rovers, as well as English clubs Barrow, Southport, and Hartlepool United and in the Solomon Islands for Western United.

== Career ==
Murray is a product of the Motherwell Academy, regularly turning out for their under-20 squad. On 9 November 2013, Murray made his debut for Motherwell as a substitute in a 4–0 defeat against Dundee United.

Having left Motherwell at the end of the 2013–14 season, Murray played as a trialist for Arbroath against Berwick Rangers on 9 August 2014 before signing for Scottish League Two club Clyde on 19 September 2014. On 23 December 2014, he was released by Clyde. In 2015, Murray signed for Western United in the Solomon Islands ahead of their OFC Champions League campaign.

Having returned to Scotland, Murray signed for Stenhousemuir on 8 July 2015, however, he left the club in May 2016 after declining the offer of a new contract to pursue a full-time offer from an English club. On 22 July 2016, Murray signed for English National League club Barrow. He subsequently signed for Southport, before once again returning to Scotland, this time to sign with Scottish League One team Raith Rovers in June 2017.

After two seasons with the Rovers, Murray signed with Fife rivals Dunfermline Athletic in June 2019. Murray spent two season with Dunfermline before leaving the club at the end of his contract in May 2021. He subsequently joined recently relegated Kilmarnock on a two-year deal. He made 38 appearances in all competitions as the club won the Scottish Championship title.

On 24 June 2022, his contract with Kilmarnock had been cancelled by mutual consent. Later on the same day, it was announced that Murray had signed for League Two side Hartlepool United. On 17 July 2023, Murray's contract was terminated by mutual consent. Murray made 36 appearances for Hartlepool.

On 18 July 2023, Murray signed a two-year deal to return to Raith Rovers.

== International career ==
Murray played one match for Scotland Under-18s against Serbia in April 2012.

== Career statistics ==
As of 25 April 2026

Appearances and goals by club, season and competition
Club	Season	League			National Cup		League Cup		Other		Total	
Club	Season	Division	Apps	Goals	Apps	Goals	Apps	Goals	Apps	Goals	Apps	Goals
Motherwell	2013–14	Scottish Premiership	3	0	0	0	0	0	0	0	3	0
Arbroath	2014–15	Scottish League Two	1	0	0	0	0	0	0	0	1	0
Clyde	2014–15	Scottish League Two	6	1	0	0	0	0	0	0	6	1
Western United	2014–15	S-League	0	0	0	0	0	0	3 (Note: Appearances in O-League)	0	3	0
Stenhousemuir	2015–16	Scottish League One	28	3	1	0	1	0	2 (Note: Appearances in Scottish Challenge Cup)	0	32	3
Barrow	2016–17	National League	6	0	0	0	0	0	2 (Note: Appearances in FA Trophy)	0	8	0
Southport	2016–17	National League	12	0	0	0	0	0	0	0	12	0
Raith Rovers	2017–18	Scottish League One	34	3	1	0	4	0	6 (Note: Appearances in Scottish Championship play-offs)	1	45	4
Raith Rovers	2018–19	Scottish League One	34	4	3	1	4	0	6 (Note: Appearances in Scottish Championship play-offs)	0	47	5
Raith Rovers	Total		68	7	4	1	8	0	12	1	92	9
Dunfermline Athletic	2019–20	Scottish Championship	10	2	0	0	1	0	0	0	11	2
Dunfermline Athletic	2020–21	Scottish Championship	24	3	1	0	6	4	2 (Note: Appearances in Scottish Premiership play-offs)	0	33	7
Dunfermline Athletic	Total		34	5	1	0	7	4	2	0	44	9
Kilmarnock	2021–22	Scottish Championship	28	0	2	1	5	0	3	1	38	2
Hartlepool United	2022–23	League Two	29	0	3	0	1	0	3 (Note: Appearances in EFL Trophy)	0	36	0
Raith Rovers	2023–24	Scottish Championship	30	1	0	0	1	0	2	0	33	1
Raith Rovers	2024–25	Scottish Championship	18	0	3	0	3	1	0	0	24	1
Raith Rovers	Total		48	1	3	0	4	1	2	0	57	2
Queen's Park	2025–26	Scottish Championship	30	4	3	1	4	0	1	0	38	1
Career total			293	21	17	3	30	5	25	2	365	27

== Honours ==
Kilmarnock

- Scottish Championship: 2021–22

Individual

- PFA Scotland Team of the Year: 2018–19 Scottish League One, 2020–21 Scottish Championship
