= Matthew Shiels =

Scottish footballer (born 2000)

Personal information
- Date of birth: 13 September 2000 (age 26)
- Place of birth: Glasgow, Scotland
- Height: 1.83 m (6 ft 0 in)
- Position: Left back

Team information
- Current team: Queen's Park
- Number: 22

Youth career
- Rangers

Senior career*
Years	Team	Apps	(Gls)
2018–2021	Rangers	0	(0)
2018	→ Edinburgh City (loan)	3	(0)
2019	→ Dumbarton (loan)	8	(0)
2020	→ Orange County SC (loan)	0	(0)
2020	→ Clyde (loan)	6	(0)
2021–2023	Hamilton Academical	35	(0)
2023–2024	Dumbarton	17	(2)
2024	Cove Rangers	8	(0)
2024–2025	Dumbarton	25	(3)
2025–	Queen's Park	36	(1)

International career
2017	Republic of Ireland U18		
2018	Republic of Ireland U19		
2018–2019	Scotland U19	10	(0)
- * Club domestic league appearances and goals as of 4 May 2026

Matthew Shiels (born 13 September 2000) is a Scottish professional footballer who plays as a left back for Queen's Park.

== Early and personal life ==
Shiels was born in Glasgow. His paternal grandparents were from Donegal in Ireland, and he grew supporting Celtic.

== Club career ==
After playing youth football for Rangers, and spending loan spells at Edinburgh City, Dumbarton and Clyde, as well as in the United States with Orange County SC, Shiels signed for Hamilton Academical in summer 2021.

Shiels left Hamilton in June 2023 and re-joined Dumbarton in August 2023 scoring his first goal for the club in a 4–0 victory against Bonnyrigg Rose in November 2023, in a game where he also won a penalty and provided an assist. After impressing for the Sons, he left for Scottish League One side Cove Rangers in January 2024 – scoring on his final appearance for the Sons in a 4–1 defeat to Rangers. He left Cove after just eight appearances, and returned to Dumbarton on a season long deal in the summer of 2024.

He signed for Queen's Park in June 2025, and renewed his contract with the club in May 2026.

== International career ==
Having previously been called up for Scotland at under-17 level, in November 2017 he was called up to the Republic of Ireland under-18 squad, making his debut on 9 November.

He also played with the Republic of Ireland under-19s, before later reverting his international allegiance back to Scotland, playing ten games for the Scotland under-19 team.

== Playing style ==
Shiels plays primarily as a left back, but also played as a left winger and striker for Rangers. On signing for Dumbarton in August 2023 he said he preferred playing in a more attacking role. During his time with Queens Park, he was described by the club as a " dependable utility man [...] playing a variety of positions".

== Career statistics ==
As of match played 18 October 2025

Appearances and goals by club, season and competition
Club	Season	League			National cup (Note: Includes Scottish Cup, U.S. Open Cup)		League cup (Note: Includes Scottish League Cup)		Other		Total	
Club	Season	Division	Apps	Goals	Apps	Goals	Apps	Goals	Apps	Goals	Apps	Goals
Rangers U20	2017–18	—			—		—		1 (Note: Appearance(s) in Scottish Challenge Cup)	0	1	0
Rangers U20	2019–20	—			—		—		1	0	1	0
Rangers U20	2020–21	—			—		—		0	0	0	0
Rangers U20	Total		—		—		—		2	0	2	0
Edinburgh City (loan)	2017–18	Scottish League Two	3	0	—		—		—		3	0
Dumbarton (loan)	2019–20	Scottish League One	8	0	1	0	0	0	0	0	9	0
Orange County SC (loan)	2020	USL Championship	0	0	0	0	—		—		0	0
Clyde (loan)	2020–21	Scottish League One	6	0	0	0	4	0	0	0	10	0
Hamilton Academical	2021–22	Scottish Championship	8	0	1	0	0	0	1	0	10	0
Hamilton Academical	2022–23	Scottish Championship	27	0	3	0	4	3	7 (Note: Four appearances in Scottish Challenge Cup; Three appearances in Scottish Championship play-offs)	0	41	3
Hamilton Academical	Total		35	0	4	0	4	3	8	0	51	3
Dumbartom	2023–24	Scottish League Two	17	2	3	1	0	0	2	0	22	3
Cove Rangers	2023–24	Scottish League One	8	0	—		—		—		8	0
Dumbartom	2024–25	Scottish League One	25	3	1	0	4	0	0	0	30	3
Queen's Park	2025–26	Scottish Championship	11	0	0	0	4	0	0	0	15	0
Career total			113	5	9	1	16	3	12	0	150	9

== Honours ==
Hamilton Academical

- Scottish Challenge Cup: 2022–23
