= Michael Ruth =

Scottish footballer

Personal information
- Full name: Michael James Ruth
- Date of birth: 8 January 2002 (age 24)
- Place of birth: Glasgow, Scotland
- Position: Striker

Team information
- Current team: Queen's Park
- Number: 9

Youth career
- –2018: Queen's Park

Senior career*
Years	Team	Apps	(Gls)
2018–2019	Queen's Park	10	(1)
2019–2022	Aberdeen	4	(0)
2020–2021	→ Arbroath (loan)	11	(0)
2021–2022	→ Falkirk (loan)	12	(4)
2022–2023	Queen of the South	17	(0)
2023–2025	Dumbarton	64	(18)
2025–	Queen's Park	16	(4)
- * Club domestic league appearances and goals as of 4 May 2026

Michael James Ruth (born 8 January 2002) is a Scottish professional footballer who plays as a striker for Scottish Championship club Queen's Park. Ruth has previously played for Queen's Park, Aberdeen, Queen of the South and Dumbarton, as well as loan spells with Arbroath and Falkirk.

== Early and personal life ==
Ruth was born in Glasgow.

== Career ==
After progressing through their youth academy, Ruth debuted for Queen's Park on 31 March 2018 versus Airdrieonians and made ten league appearances for the Spiders, scoring one goal.

Ruth signed for Scottish Premiership club Aberdeen on a two-year contract in June 2019. Ruth signed a one-year contract extension with the Dons in September 2020 and joined Scottish Championship club Arbroath on a season-long loan deal. The loan was curtailed on 1 February 2021, as the Dons made several squad changes.

Ruth was loaned to Falkirk in September 2021.

On 14 June 2022, after his contract expired at the Dons, Ruth signed a one-year contract for Queen of the South.

Ruth was released by the Doonhamers at the end of the 2022-23 season.

Ruth signed for Scottish League Two club Dumbarton in June 2023. He scored 15 goals for the Sons in the 2023–24 season, including a double in the playoff final against The Spartans, as the club won promotion to Scottish League One. He signed a new season long deal with the club in May 2024.

On 12 June 2025, Ruth returned to his first club Queen's Park and signed a permanent deal with the club.

== Career statistics ==
As of 15:49, 3 May 2025 (UTC)

Appearances and goals by club, season and competition
Club	Season	League			Scottish Cup		League Cup		Other		Total	
Club	Season	Division	Apps	Goals	Apps	Goals	Apps	Goals	Apps	Goals	Apps	Goals
Queen's Park	2017–18	Scottish League One	3	0	0	0	0	0	0	0	3	0
Queen's Park	2018–19	Scottish League Two	7	1	0	0	0	0	0	0	7	1
Queen's Park	Total		10	1	0	0	0	0	0	0	10	1
Aberdeen	2019–20	Scottish Premiership	0	0	0	0	0	0	0	0	0	0
Aberdeen	2020–21	Scottish Premiership	1	0	1	0	0	0	0	0	2	0
Aberdeen	2021–22	Scottish Premiership	3	0	0	0	0	0	0	0	3	0
Aberdeen	Total		4	0	1	0	0	0	0	0	5	0
Aberdeen U21	2019–20		—						1 (Note: Appearance(s) in Scottish Challenge Cup)	0	1	0
Aberdeen U21	2021–22		—						1 (Note: Appearance(s) in Scottish Challenge Cup)	1	1	1
Aberdeen U21	Total		0	0	0	0	0	0	2	1	2	1
Arbroath (loan)	2020–21	Scottish Championship	11	0	0	0	5	0	0	0	16	0
Falkirk (loan)	2021-22	Scottish League One	12	4	1	0	0	0	0	0	13	4
Queen of the South	2022-23	Scottish League One	17	0	1	0	1	0	4	1	23	1
Dumbarton	2023–24	Scottish League Two	33	9	3	3	3	0	5	3	44	15
Dumbarton	2024–25	Scottish League One	31	9	1	1	3	0	2	1	37	11
Dumbarton	Total		64	18	4	4	3	0	7	4	81	26
Career total			117	23	7	4	12	0	13	6	148	33
