= Josh Fowler =

Scottish footballer (born 2001)

Personal information
- Full name: Josh Fowler
- Date of birth: 14 November 2001 (age 24)
- Place of birth: Paisley, Scotland
- Position: Striker

Team information
- Current team: St Johnstone
- Number: 9

Youth career
- St Cadocs Youth Club

Senior career*
Years	Team	Apps	(Gls)
2020–2021	Johnstone Burgh		
2021–2022	Beith Juniors		
2023–2024	Gulf United		
2024	St Albans Saints	4	(1)
2025	Dubai City	23	(17)
2025–2026	Queen's Park	16	(10)
2026–	St Johnstone	15	(3)
- * Club domestic league appearances and goals as of 13:19, 9 August 2026 (UTC)

Josh Fowler (born 14 November 2001) is a Scottish professional footballer who plays as a striker Scottish Premiership club St Johnstone.

== Career ==
During his time at Beith Juniors, Fowler had trials with Scottish Premiership clubs Motherwell and Kilmarnock but wasn't signed.

After playing in both Australia and Dubai, Fowler signed with Scottish club Queen's Park in June 2025.

Fowler scored on his Queen's Park debut in a 2–1 away loss to The Spartans in the Scottish League Cup group stages. Fowler scored his first league goal for Queen's Park in a 3–1 away defeat to Arbroath.

On 29 January 2026, Fowler signed with fellow Scottish Championship side St Johnstone on a two and a half year deal, for an undisclosed fee.

== Honours ==
St Johnstone

- Scottish Championship: 2025–26
