= Finlay Gray =

Scottish footballer (born 2002)

Personal information
- Date of birth: 28 April 2002
- Place of birth: Cardross, Scotland
- Position: Midfielder

Team information
- Current team: East Kilbride
- Number: 18

Youth career
- St Mirren

Senior career*
Years	Team	Apps	(Gls)
2021–2022	Broomhill		
2022–2025	Dumbarton	100	(11)
2025–2026	Stenhousemuir	20	(1)
2026–	East Kilbride	4	(2)
- * Club domestic league appearances and goals as of 27 August 2026

Finlay Gray (born 28 February 2002) is a Scottish footballer who plays as a midfielder for Scottish League One club East Kilbride.

== Career ==
=== Dumbarton ===
On 9 July 2022, Dumbarton announced that they had signed Gray from Broomhill on a free transfer following a trial period. Gray scored his first goal for the club in a 2–0 victory against Peterhead on his first start in July 2022. Gray scored his first goal in Scottish League Two against Annan Athletic in what became a 4–0 victory for Dumbarton, helping the club match their best league start to a season since 1959. The next week, Gray scored a solo goal in injury-time against Stenhousemuir, carrying the ball from deep in his own half to the opposition penalty area where he had his initial shot deflected by the keeper before scoring the rebound. Gray won the Dumbarton player of the month award for August 2022. He helped the club to promotion in the 2023–24 season, scoring in the first leg of the playoff final victory against Spartans. In total Gray played 128 times scoring 16 goals across three seasons at the club.

=== Stenhousemuir ===
After three seasons at Dumbarton, Gray joined Stenhousemuir in June 2025.

== Personal life ==
Gray has supported Dumbarton since he was a child.
