= 2020–21 Alloa Athletic F.C. season =

Alloa Athletic
2020–21 season
- Chairman: Mike Mulraney
- Manager: Peter Grant
- Stadium: Recreation Park
- Scottish Championship: 10th (Relegated)
- Scottish Cup: Second Round
- Scottish League Cup: Quarter–Final
- Top goalscorer: League: Innes Cameron (6); All: Alan Trouten (8)
Home colours	Away colours

The 2020–21 season will be Alloa Athletic's third consecutive season in the Scottish Championship, following their promotion from Scottish League One in the 2017–18 season. They will also compete in the Scottish Cup and Scottish League Cup.

== Season summary ==
In June 2020, eight of the ten clubs voted in favour of shortening the season from the usual 36 games to 27 (playing each other three times), with the season tentatively scheduled to start on 17 October 2020. This was done to reduce costs in light of the coronavirus pandemic.

== Competitions ==
=== Scottish Championship ===
==== League table ====
Pos	Team	Pld	W	D	L	GF	GA	GD	Pts	Promotion, qualification or relegation
6	Queen of the South	27	9	5	13	38	51	−13	32	
7	Arbroath	27	7	9	11	28	34	−6	30	
8	Ayr United	27	6	11	10	31	37	−6	29	
9	Greenock Morton (O)	27	6	11	10	22	33	−11	29	Qualification for the Championship play-offs
10	Alloa Athletic (R)	27	5	7	15	30	60	−30	22	Relegation to League One

Source: SPFL
Rules for classification: 1) Points; 2) Goal difference; 3) Goals scored; 4) Head-to-to head points; 5) Head-to-head goal difference; 6) Play-off (only for deciding promotion, play-off participation and relegation).
(O) Play-off winners; (R) Relegated

==== Matches ====
Win	Draw	Loss

Date	Opponent	Venue	Result (Note: Alloa Athletic's score written first)	Scorers	Attendance	Ref.
17 October 2020	Greenock Morton	Away	0–1	—	0 (Note: Match played behind closed doors)	
24 October 2020	Dunfermline Athletic	Home	1–4	Cawley 45+1'	0	
6 November 2020	Dundee	Home	3–3	Thomson 31', Trouten 51', 63'	0	
21 November 2020	Queen of the South	Away	0–2	—	0	
24 November 2020	Heart of Midlothian	Away	0–3	—	0	
5 December 2020	Ayr United	Home	0–2	—	0	
12 December 2020	Arbroath	Away	1–0	Scougall 79'	0	
19 December 2020	Inverness Caledonian Thistle	Home	2–1	Murray 61', Thomson 78'	0	
26 December 2020	Raith Rovers	Home	2–5	Buchanan 75', 89 pen.	0	
29 December 2020	Dundee	Away	1–3	Hetherington 11'	0	
2 January 2021	Greenock Morton	Home	1–1	Thomson 83'	0	
16 January 2021	Heart of Midlothian	Home	1–3	Cawley 87'	0	
30 January 2021	Ayr United	Away	1–4	Trouten 11'	0	
6 February 2021	Queen of the South	Home	2–1	Graham 23' Cawley 61'	0	
13 February 2021	Arbroath	Home	1–1	Cameron 90'	0	
20 February 2021	Dunfermline Athletic	Away	1–2	Cawley 44'	0	
23 February 2021	Inverness Caledonian Thistle	Away	2–2	Cameron 20' Trouten 87' pen.	0	
27 February 2021	Raith Rovers	Away	1–3	Cameron 14'	0	
6 March 2021	Inverness Caledonian Thistle	Home	1–1	Cameron 17'	0	
13 March 2021	Queen of the South	Away	3–2	Murray 20' Connelly 44' Buchanan 77'	0	
19 March 2021	Dundee	Home	0–3		0	
27 March 2021	Ayr United	Home	2–2	Cameron 31' Williamson 46'	0	
3 April 2021	Arbroath	Away	1–2	Trouten 64'	0	
9 April 2021	Heart of Midlothian	Away	0–6		0	
17 April 2021	Raith Rovers	Home	1–2	Cawley 23'	0	
24 April 2021	Greenock Morton	Away	1–1	Cameron 49'	0	
30 April 2021	Dunfermline Athletic	Home	1–0	Dick 47'	0	

=== Scottish League Cup ===
==== Group stage ====
Pos	Team	Pld	W	PW	PL	L	GF	GA	GD	Pts	Qualification	LIV	ALO	EDI	AIR	STE
1	Livingston	4	4	0	0	0	15	3	+12	12	Qualification for the Second round	—	2–1	—	4–1	—
2	Alloa Athletic	4	3	0	0	1	9	5	+4	9	Qualification for the Second round	—	—	2–1	—	4–2
3	Edinburgh City	4	1	0	1	2	5	9	−4	4		1–5	—	—	—	2–2p
4	Airdrieonians	4	1	0	0	3	3	7	−4	3		—	0–2	0–1	—	—
5	Stenhousemuir	4	0	1	0	3	4	12	−8	2		0–4	—	—	0–2	—

Rules for classification: 1) points, 2) goal difference, 3) goals scored, 4) away goals scored, 5) matches won, 6) away matches won, 7) drawing of lots.

Win	Draw	Loss

Date	Opponent	Venue	Result	Scorers	Attendance	Ref.
6 October 2020	Airdrieonians	Away	2–0	Trouten 14' (pen.), Thomson 69'	0	
10 October 2020	Livingston	Away	1–2	Thomson 31'	0	
13 October 2020	Edinburgh City	Home	2–1	Scougall 18', Thomson 85'	0	
14 November 2020	Stenhousemuir	Home	4–2	Buchanan 64', 70' (pen.), 78', Hetherington 90'	0	

==== Knockout phase ====
Win	Draw	Loss

Round	Date	Opponent	Venue	Result	Scorers	Attendance	Ref.
Second round	28 November 2020	Heart of Midlothian	Home	1–0 (a.e.t.)	Trouten 109' (pen.)	0	
Quarter-final	15 December 2020	Hibernian	Home	1–2	Hanlon 34' (o.g.)	0	

=== Scottish Cup ===
Win	Draw	Loss

Round	Date	Opponent	Venue	Result	Scorers	Attendance	Ref.
Second Round	9 January 2021	Cove Rangers	Home	2–3	Trouten 28' pen.	0	
