= 2024–25 Cove Rangers F.C. season =

Cove Rangers
2024–25 season
- Chairman: Keith Moorhouse
- Manager: Paul Hartley
- Stadium: Balmoral Stadium
- League One: 2nd
- Scottish Cup: Fifth round
- League Cup: Group Stage
- Top goalscorer: League: Mitch Megginson (13); All: Mitch Megginson (15)
- Highest home attendance: 1,065 vs Queen of the South (10 May 2025)
- Lowest home attendance: 176 vs Stenhousemuir (3 December 2024)
- Average home league attendance: 439 (21 December 2024)
Home colours	Away colours

The 2024–25 season is Cove Rangers's second consecutive season in the third tier of Scottish football, having been relegated from the Scottish Championship at the end of the 2022–23 season.

== Season review ==
=== Pre Season ===
On 29 May, Cove Rangers announced the departures of Rumarn Burrell, Dajon Golding, Paul McGowan, Mark Reynolds, Matty Shiels, Cameron Stewart and Iain Vigurs following the expiration of their contracts while Jacob Jones agreed an early release from his contract. Cove Rangers set up friendlies against Dunfermline Athletic, Banks O'Dee, Inverurie Locos and Formartine.

=== June ===
On 4 June, Kyle Connell left the club to join Clyde. Cove made their first signing of the season on 19 June when they brought back Declan Glass for a third spell at the club. On the same day Sena left the club to join Dumbarton and Tyler Mykyta left to join Formartine

=== July ===
On 6 July, Cove signed Ryan Harrington on a free transfer. Cove signed 16 year old Cole Donaldson on 10 July. On 15 July Cove signed two players, Grady McGrath and Finlay Murray. Mark Gallagher left the club to rejoin Elgin City on 30 July.

=== August ===
Josh Kerr departed the club to join Stirling Albion on 2 August. On the same day Cove brought in two young Aberdeen players on loan, Adam Emslie and Findlay Marshall. Six days later on the 8th Jack Robertson left the club to join Huntly on loan. The next day Luke Strachan agreed an early release from the club. Cove announced the loan signing of Reuben McAllister from Hibernian on 23 August and on the same day they announced the loan signing of Liam Parker from St Johnstone.

=== September ===
Cove announced the loan of Cole Donaldson to Inverurie Locos and two weeks later Cove announced another loan signing from Aberdeen, Dylan Lobban joining the club.

=== January ===
Reuben McAllister returned to Hibs following the expiration of his loan deal. On 18 January, Cole Donaldson returned to the club from his loan following a leg break, which ruled him out for the season. Quinn Coulson joined Cove on loan from fellow League One side Arbroath.

== Squad ==
As of 24 January 2025

No.	Name	Nationality	Position	Apps.	Goals
Goalkeepers
1	Nicholas Suman	(Australia)	GK	43	0
21	Balint Demus	(Hungary)	GK	30	0
Defenders
2	Finlay Murray	(Scotland)	DF	6	0
3	Michael Doyle	(Scotland)	DF	57	3
6	Will Gillingham	(England)	DF	52	0
7	Ryan Harrington	(Wales)	DF	28	0
12	Milosz Ochmanski	(Poland)	DF	3	0
15	Arron Darge	(Scotland)	DF	58	2
32	Liam Parker	(Scotland)	DF	8	1
Midfielders
4	Connor Scully	(Scotland)	MF	256	23
8	Blair Yule	(Scotland)	MF	205	12
10	Declan Glass	(Scotland)	MF	51	12
14	Quinn Coulson	(Scotland)	MF	1	0
17	Findlay Marshall	(Scotland)	MF	20	4
18	Dylan Lobban	(Scotland)	MF	13	0
19	Cole Donaldson	(Scotland)	MF	0	0
24	Fraser Fyvie	(Scotland)	MF	145	26
25	Mikey Milnes	(Scotland)	MF	0	0
Forwards
9	Mitch Megginson	(Scotland)	FW	280	197
11	Grady McGrath	(Scotland)	FW	18	2
20	Myles Gaffney	(Scotland)	FW	21	4
22	Adam Emslie	(Scotland)	FW	23	6
On loan
23	Jack Robertson	(Scotland)	GK	0	0
Players who left during the season
—	Josh Kerr	(Scotland)	DF	32	4
—	Luke Strachan	(Scotland)	DF	1	0
—	Reuben McAllister	(Scotland)	MF	9	0

== Transfers ==
=== In ===
Date	Position	Nationality	Name	From	Fee	Ref
19 June 2024	MF	(Scotland)	Declan Glass	Unattached	Free	
6 July 2024	DF	(Wales)	Ryan Harrington	Unattached	Free	
10 July 2024	MF	(Scotland)	Cole Donaldson	Unattached	Free	
15 July 2024	DF	(Scotland)	Finlay Murray	Unattached	Free	
15 July 2024	FW	(Scotland)	Grady McGrath	Brechin City	Undisclosed	

=== Loans in ===
Date	Position	Nationality	Name	From	Date to	Ref
2 August 2024	MF	(Scotland)	Findlay Marshall	Aberdeen	End of season	
2 August 2024	FW	(Scotland)	Adam Emslie	Aberdeen	End of season	
23 August 2024	DF	(Scotland)	Liam Parker	St Johnstone	End of season	
23 August 2024	MF	(Scotland)	Reuben McAllister	Hibernian	1 January 2025	
28 September 2024	MF	(Scotland)	Dylan Lobban	Aberdeen	End of season	
24 January 2025	FW	(Scotland)	Quinn Coulson	Arbroath	End of season	

=== Out ===
Date	Position	Nationality	Name	To	Fee	Ref.
4 June 2024	FW	(Scotland)	Kyle Connell	Clyde	Undisclosed	
30 July 2024	MF	(Scotland)	Mark Gallagher	Elgin City	Free	
2 August 2024	DF	(Scotland)	Josh Kerr	Stirling Albion	Free	

=== Loans out ===
Date	Position	Nationality	Name	To	Loan length	Ref.
8 August 2024	GK	(Scotland)	Jack Robertson	Huntly	End of season	
14 September 2024	MF	(Scotland)	Cole Donaldson	Inverurie Locos	17 January 2025	

=== Released ===
Date	Position	Nationality	Name	Joined	Ref.
9 August 2024	DF	(Scotland)	Luke Strachan	Unattached	

== Competitions ==
=== Overview ===
Competition	First match	Last match	Starting round	Final position	Record							
Competition	First match	Last match	Starting round	Final position	Pld	W	D	L	GF	GA	GD	Win %
League One	3 August 2024	3 May 2025	Matchday 1		36	16	9	11	62	44	+18	44.44
Scottish Cup	30 November 2024	8 February 2025	Third Round	Fifth Round	3	2	0	1	4	3	+1	66.67
League Cup	16 July 2024	27 July 2024	Group Stage	Group Stage	4	1	0	3	2	11	−9	25.00
Challenge Cup	7 September 2024	7 September 2024	Third Round	Third Round	1	0	0	1	2	3	−1	0.00
Total					44	19	9	16	70	61	+9	43.18

Last updated: 30 January 2025

=== League One ===
==== League table ====
Pos	Team	Pld	W	D	L	GF	GA	GD	Pts	Promotion, qualification or relegation
1	Arbroath (C, P)	36	19	7	10	58	42	+16	64	Promotion to the Championship
2	Cove Rangers	36	16	9	11	62	44	+18	57	Qualification for the Championship play-offs
3	Queen of the South	36	16	7	13	46	41	+5	55	Qualification for the Championship play-offs
4	Stenhousemuir	36	15	8	13	48	45	+3	53	Qualification for the Championship play-offs
5	Alloa Athletic	36	13	12	11	55	47	+8	51	

Rules for classification: 1) Points; 2) Goal difference; 3) Goals scored; 4) Head-to-to head points; 5) Head-to-head goal difference; 6) Play-off (only for deciding promotion, play-off participation and relegation).
(C) Champions; (P) Promoted

==== Results summary ====
Overall								Home						Away					
Pld	W	D	L	GF	GA	GD	Pts	W	D	L	GF	GA	GD	W	D	L	GF	GA	GD
36	16	9	11	62	44	+18	57	7	6	5	24	24	0	9	3	6	38	20	+18

Last updated: 3 May 2025.
Source: SPFL

==== Results ====
3 August 2024 1	Cove Rangers	1-3	Annan Athletic	Cove Bay
15:00 BST (UTC+1)	Murray (yellow card) 10'; Megginson (yellow card) 68', (red card) 90+8'; Marshall (yellow card) 83', (goal) 86'	Report	Muir 56'; Todd 80'; Kilsby (yellow card) 90+6'; Zaid 90+7'	Stadium: Balmoral Stadium; Attendance: 452; Referee: Alistair Grieve

10 August 2024 2	Queen of the South	2-1	Cove Rangers	Dumfries
15:00 BST (UTC+1)	Johnstone (yellow card) 30'; McKechnie 69'; Hewitt 71'; MacIntyre (yellow card) 75'; Walker (yellow card) 80'	Report	Darge (yellow card) 45'; Emslie 62'	Stadium: Palmerston Park; Attendance: 1,126; Referee: Andy Gamble

17 August 2024 3	Cove Rangers	1-1	Dumbarton	Cove Bay
15:00 BST (UTC+1)	Glass (penalty missed) 20'; Emslie 64', (yellow card) 89'; Scully (yellow card) 81'	Report	Orsi (yellow card) 81'; Durnan 90+1'	Stadium: Balmoral Stadium; Attendance: 462; Referee: Colin Whyte

24 August 2024 4	Stenhousemuir	3-2	Cove Rangers	Stenhousemuir
15:00 BST (UTC+1)	Taylor (yellow card) 30'; O'Donnell 45', (yellow card) 61'; Anderson 48'; Wedderburn 58'	Report	Marshall 33'; McGrath 90+2'	Stadium: Ochilview Park; Attendance: 561; Referee: Steven Kirkland

31 August 2024 5	Cove Rangers	1-0	Montrose	Cove Bay
15:00 BST (UTC+1)	Megginson 49'; Darge (yellow card) 62'; Gillingham (yellow card) 80'	Report	Masson (yellow card) 19'; Brown (penalty missed) 41'; Bertie (yellow card) 90'	Stadium: Balmoral Stadium; Attendance: 479; Referee: Duncan Nicolson

14 September 2024 6	Kelty Hearts	1-3	Cove Rangers	Kelty
15:00 BST (UTC+1)	Cunningham 64'	Report	Megginson 41'; Yule 86'; Marshall 90+2'	Stadium: New Central Park; Attendance: 377; Referee: Ryan Lee

21 September 2024 7	Inverness CT	1-1	Cove Rangers	Inverness
15:00 BST (UTC+1)	Nolan 51'; Gilmour (yellow card) 60'	Report	Emslie 21'; Doyle (yellow card) 39'; Darge (yellow card) 42'; Yule (yellow card) 43'; Marshall (yellow card) 84'	Stadium: Caledonian Stadium; Attendance: 1,505; Referee: Stewart Luke

28 September 2024 8	Cove Rangers	2-4	Arbroath	Cove Bay
17:30 BST (UTC+1)	Yule 39'; Parker 42'; Darge (yellow card) 77'; Doyle (yellow card) 90+2'	Report	Stewart 31'; Murray 38', (yellow card) 52'; Spalding 46'; Wilkie 73'	Stadium: Balmoral Stadium; Attendance: 645; Referee: Greg Soutar

5 October 2024 9	Alloa Athletic	0-2	Cove Rangers	Alloa
15:00 BST (UTC+1)	Donnelly (red card) 37'; Thomson (yellow card) 90+4'	Report	Scully 16'; Fyvie 24'; Yule (yellow card) 69'; Darge (yellow card) 74'	Stadium: Recreation Park; Attendance: 652; Referee: Graham Grainger

19 October 2024 10	Cove Rangers	2-0	Queen of the South	Cove Bay
15:00 BST (UTC+1)	Fyvie 35'; Megginson 82'	Report		Stadium: Balmoral Stadium; Attendance: 519; Referee: Craig Napier

26 October 2024 11	Montrose	0-2	Cove Rangers	Montrose
15:00 BST (UTC+1)	Dillon (yellow card) 45+2'; Hester (yellow card) 55'; McKenzie (yellow card) 60'; Steeves (yellow card) 68'	Report	Doyle 48'; Fyvie (yellow card) 58'; Yule (yellow card) 67'; Megginson 86'	Stadium: Links Park; Attendance: 691; Referee: Dan Nicolson

2 November 2024 12	Dumbarton	0-3	Cove Rangers	Dumbarton
15:00 BST (UTC+1)	Durnan (yellow card) 58'	Report	Fyvie 50'; Megginson 58'; Emslie 89'	Stadium: Dumbarton Football Stadium; Attendance: 568; Referee: George Calder

9 November 2024 13	Cove Rangers	1-2	Inverness CT	Cove Bay
15:00 BST (UTC+1)	Megginson 10', (penalty missed) 37; Fyvie (yellow card) 90+2'	Report	MacKinnon 39'; Bray 67'	Stadium: Balmoral Stadium; Attendance: 551; Referee: Euan Anderson

16 November 2024 14	Arbroath	2-1	Cove Rangers	Arbroath
15:00 BST (UTC+1)	Stewart 18'; Murray 32'; Flynn (yellow card) 72'; Slater (yellow card) 82'; Watson (yellow card) 90+3'	Report	Megginson 5'; Yule (yellow card) 29'; Glass (yellow card) 38'; Harrington (yellow card) 90+5'	Stadium: Gayfield Park; Attendance: 551; Referee: Euan Anderson

3 December 2024 15	Cove Rangers	0-3	Stenhousemuir	Cove Bay
15:00 BST (UTC+1)	Gillingham (yellow card) 70'	Report	Aitken 24'; Tomlinson 31'; Wedderburn (yellow card) 79'; O'Donnell 90+2'	Stadium: Balmoral Stadium; Attendance: 176; Referee: Scott Lambie

7 December 2024 16	Annan Athletic	1-1	Cove Rangers	Annan
15:00 BST (UTC+1)	Muir 70'; Smith (penalty missed) 73; Smith (yellow card) 76'	Report	Glass 24'; Doyle (yellow card) 72'	Stadium: Galabank Stadium; Attendance: 315; Referee: Alistair Grieve

14 December 2024 17	Cove Rangers	0-0	Kelty Hearts	Cove Bay
15:00 BST (UTC+1)	Scully (yellow card) 29'; Fyvie (yellow card) 74'	Report	O'Ware (yellow card) 80'	Stadium: Balmoral Stadium; Attendance: 443; Referee: Iain Snedden

21 December 2024 18	Cove Rangers	2-0	Alloa Athletic	Cove Bay
15:00 BST (UTC+1)	Darge 22'; Suman (yellow card) 80'; Gaffney 88'	Report	Neill (yellow card) 86'	Stadium: Balmoral Stadium; Attendance: 323; Referee: Craig Napier

28 December 2024 19	Inverness CT	1-4	Cove Rangers	Inverness
15:00 BST (UTC+1)	Savage 37'; Devine (yellow card) 65'	Report	Glass 5'; Megginson 18'; Darge 49'; Harrington (yellow card) 85'; Emslie 89'	Stadium: Caledonian Stadium; Attendance: 1,974; Referee: Iain Snedden

4 January 2025 20	Queen of the South	1-0	Cove Rangers	Dumfries
15:00 BST (UTC+1)	Hewitt 23'	Report	Gaffney (yellow card) 89'	Stadium: Palmerston Park; Attendance: 915; Referee: Dan Nicolson

25 January 2025 22	Stenhousemuir	0-4	Cove Rangers	Stenhousemuir
15:00 BST (UTC+1)		Report	Glass 29'; Megginson 31'; Marshall 38'; Fyvie 84'	Stadium: Ochilview Park; Attendance: 336; Referee: Stewart Luke

1 February 2025 23	Cove Rangers	2-1	Arbroath	Cove Bay
15:00 BST (UTC+1)	Megginson 80'; Harrington 85'; Gaffney (yellow card) 88'	Report	Winter 7', (yellow card) 90'	Stadium: Balmoral Stadium; Attendance: 758; Referee: Gavin Duncan

11 February 2025 21	Cove Rangers	1-1	Montrose	Cove Bay
19:45 GMT (UTC)	Megginson (yellow card) 64'; Marshall 90+2'	Report	Steeves (yellow card) 33'; Freeman (yellow card) 40'; Stirton 46'	Stadium: Balmoral Stadium; Attendance: 452; Referee: George Calder

15 February 2025 25	Cove Rangers	3-1	Annan Athletic	Cove Bay
15:00 GMT (UTC)	Breen 8' (o.g); Marshall 28', 78'; Scully (yellow card) 77'; Glass (yellow card) 80'	Report	Darge 15' (o.g)	Stadium: Balmoral Stadium; Attendance: 331; Referee: Dan McFarlane

22 February 2025 26	Cove Rangers	2-1	Dumbarton	Cove Bay
15:00 GMT (UTC)	Megginson 45' (pen.); Fyvie 87'	Report	Pignatello 5'; Ruth (yellow card) 77'; Miller (yellow card) 90'	Stadium: Balmoral Stadium; Attendance: 331; Referee: Dan McFarlane

1 March 2025 27	Alloa Athletic	2-1	Cove Rangers	Alloa
15:00 GMT (UTC)	Charlie Dewar (yellow card) 26'; Donnelly 75'; Scougall 84'; Virtanen (red card) 90+3'	Report	Adam Marc Emslie 7'; Doyle (yellow card) 62'	Stadium: Recreation Park; Attendance: 622; Referee: (Scotland) Sean Murdoch

8 March 2025 28	Cove Rangers	3-1	Queen of the South	Aberdeen
15:00 GMT (UTC)	Blair Yule 28'; Adam Marc Emslie 36' 62'; Connor Scully (yellow card) 66'	Report	Lyon 7'; Dickenson (yellow card) 38'	Stadium: Balmoral Stadium; Attendance: 411; Referee: (Scotland) Euan Anderson

11 March 2025 24	Kelty Hearts	0-4	Cove Rangers	Kelty
19:45 GMT (UTC)	Blaine McClure (yellow card) 63'	Report	Megginson 11'; Fyvie 46' 71'; Lobban (yellow card) 67'; Adam Marc Emslie 73'	Stadium: New Central Park; Attendance: 339; Referee: (Scotland) Daniel Graves

15 March 2025 29	Montrose	2-2	Cove Rangers	Montrose
15:00 GMT (UTC)	Blair Lyons (yellow card) 20' (goal) 52'; Wighton 78'; Waddell (yellow card) 82'	Report	Marshall (yellow card) 25'; Ryan Harrington (yellow card) 49' (goal) 88'; Megginson (yellow card) 77'; Quinn Coulson 90'	Stadium: Links Park; Attendance: 735; Referee: (Scotland) Joel Kennedy

22 March 2025 30	Cove Rangers	0-0	Stenhousemuir	Aberdeen
17:30 GMT (UTC)	Scully (yellow card) 67'; Darge (yellow card) 90+2'	Report	Buchanan (yellow card) 90+1'	Stadium: Balmoral Stadium; Attendance: 533; Referee: (Scotland) Sean Murdoch

29 March 2025 31	Arbroath	1-0	Cove Rangers	Arbroath
15:00 GMT (UTC)	Muirhead 8'; O'Brien (yellow card) 35'; Stanton (yellow card) 90+3'		Megginson (yellow card) 22', (red card) 90+4'	Stadium: Gayfield Park; Attendance: 1,422; Referee: (Scotland) Lloyd Wilson

5 April 2025 32	Cove Rangers	0-3	Inverness CT	Aberdeen
15:00 GMT (UTC)	Doyle (yellow card) 67'; Fyvie (yellow card) 90'	Report	Bray 13', 36', 72'	Stadium: Balmoral Stadium; Attendance: 454; Referee: (Scotland) Peter Stuart

12 April 2025 33	Dumbarton	1-3	Cove Rangers	Dumbarton
15:00 GMT (UTC)	Webster 49', (yellow card) 71'	Report	Lobban 27', 81'; Fyvie 32'; Parker (yellow card) 83'	Stadium: Dumbarton Football Stadium; Attendance: 531; Referee: (Scotland) Graham Grainger

19 April 2025 34	Cove Rangers	1-1	Alloa Athletic	Aberdeen
15:00 GMT (UTC)	O'Donnell 45+1' (o.g.); Darge (yellow card) 90+2'	Report	MacKenzie 65'; Scougall (yellow card) 86'; O'Donnell (yellow card) 90+1'	Stadium: Balmoral Stadium; Attendance: 484; Referee: (Scotland) Colin Steven

26 April 2025 35	Cove Rangers	2-2	Kelty Hearts	Aberdeen
15:00 GMT (UTC)	Adam Marc Emslie 30'; Megginson 37' (pen.); Doyle (yellow card) 67'; Parker (yellow card) 74'; Fyvie (yellow card) 90'	Report	Johnston 61'; Cunningham 68'	Stadium: Balmoral Stadium; Attendance: 389; Referee: (Scotland) Greg Soutar

3 May 2025 36	Annan Athletic	2-4	Cove Rangers	Annan
15:00 GMT (UTC)	Paul Smith 50'; Bisland (yellow card) 84'; Aidan Smith 84'	Report	Marshall 10'; Todd 35' (o.g.); Adam Marc Emslie 67', 73'; Darge (yellow card) 84'	Stadium: Galabank Stadium; Attendance: 415; Referee: (Scotland) Graham Grainger

=== Championship playoffs ===
6 May 2025 Semi Final 1st Leg	Queen of the South	0-0	Cove Rangers	Dumfries
19:45				Stadium: Palmerston Park; Attendance: 1,784

10 May 2025 Semi Final 2nd Leg	Cove Rangers	2-1 (2-1 agg.)	Queen of the South	Aberdeen
15:00	Megginson 8' (pen.); Yule 47'		Kennedy 77'	Stadium: Balmoral Stadium; Attendance: 1,065

14 May 2025 Semi Final 1st Leg	Cove Rangers	1-2	Airdrieonians	Aberdeen
19:45	McGrattan 35' (o.g.)		MacDonald 16'; Strapp 63'	Stadium: Balmoral Stadium

17 May 2025 Semi Final 1st Leg	Airdrieonians	0-0 (2-1 agg.)	Cove Rangers	Airdrie
17:30				Stadium: Excelsior Stadium

=== Scottish Cup ===
30 November 2024 Third round	Cove Rangers	2-0	Inverness CT	Cove Bay
15:00 GMT (UTC)	Yule (yellow card) 30'; Marshall (yellow card) 86'; Glass 89' (pen.); McGrath 90+6'	Report	Longstaff (yellow card) 32'; Devine (yellow card) 68'; McKay (yellow card) 89'	Stadium: Balmoral Stadium; Attendance: 539; Referee: Gary Hanvidge

18 January 2025 Fourth round	Cove Rangers	2-0	Forfar Athletic	Cove Bay
15:00 GMT (UTC)	Emslie 43'; Gaffney 80'	Report	Allan (yellow card) 60'; McCallum (yellow card) 80'; Morrison (yellow card) 89'	Stadium: Balmoral Stadium; Attendance: 578; Referee: Duncan Williams

8 February 2025 Fifth round	Livingston	3-0	Cove Rangers	Livingston
15:00 GMT (UTC)	McGowan 25'; Yengi 81', 83'	Report	Fyvie (yellow card) 88'	Stadium: Almondvale Stadium; Attendance: 1,111; Referee: Matthew MacDermid

=== League Cup ===
==== Group stage ====
Pos	Team	Pld	W	PW	PL	L	GF	GA	GD	Pts	Qualification	SPA	LIV	FOR	DNF	COV
1	The Spartans	4	3	0	0	1	7	3	+4	9	Qualification for the second round	—	—	1–0	0–3	—
2	Livingston	4	3	0	0	1	5	1	+4	9		0–1	—	—	1–0	—
3	Forfar Athletic	4	2	0	0	2	5	3	+2	6		—	0–2	—	—	3–0 (Note: Forfar Athletic were awarded a technical 3−0 win over Cove, who fielded an ineligible player. The match had originally finished 1–1, with Forfar securing the bonus point following a 3–1 win on penalties.)
4	Dunfermline Athletic	4	1	0	0	3	4	5	−1	3		—	—	0–2	—	1–2
5	Cove Rangers	4	1	0	0	3	2	11	−9	3		0–5	0–2	—	—	—

Rules for classification: 1) goal difference, 2) goals scored, 3) away goals scored, 4) matches won, 5) away matches won, 6) drawing of lots.

==== Results ====
16 July 2024 Group Stage	Cove Rangers	0-5	Spartans	Cove Bay
15:00 GMT (UTC)	Doyle (yellow card) 81'	Report	Henderson 17' (pen.); Gillingham 29' (o.g); Dishington 53'; Russell 73', 82'	Stadium: Balmoral Stadium; Attendance: 275; Referee: Duncan Nicolson

20 July 2024 Group Stage	Forfar Athletic	3-0 (3-1 p)	Cove Rangers	Forfar
15:00 GMT (UTC)	Malcolm 21'; Klimionek (yellow card) 40'	Report	Scully 31', (yellow card) 74'; Fyvie (yellow card) 51'	Stadium: Station Park; Attendance: 458; Referee: George Calder
	Penalties
	Skelly (penalty missed); Allan (penalty scored); Taylor (penalty scored); Cannon (penalty scored)		Fyvie (penalty missed); Glass (penalty scored); Kerr (penalty missed); Gallagher (penalty missed)

23 July 2024 Group Stage	Cove Rangers	0-2	Livingston	Cove Bay
15:00 BST (UTC+1)	Darge (yellow card) 40'; Murray (yellow card) 48'; Fyvie (yellow card) 55'	Report	Murray 6' (o.g); Kelly (yellow card) 55'; Sole 86'	Stadium: Balmoral Stadium; Attendance: 243; Referee: Euan Anderson

27 July 2024 Group Stage	Dunfermline Athletic	1-2	Cove Rangers	Dunfermline
15:00 BST (UTC+1)	Sutherland 88'; McCann (yellow card) 90'	Report	Glass (yellow card) 54'; Doyle 58'; Gaffney 84'	Stadium: East End Park; Attendance: 1,011; Referee: Calum Scott

=== Challenge Cup ===
7 September 2024 Third Round	East Kilbride	3-2	Cove Rangers	East Kilbride
15:00 BST (UTC+1)	Livingstone 3'; Lockie (yellow card) 68'; Leitch 87'; Boyd 90+2'	Report	Megginson 14'; Doyle (yellow card) 26'; Gaffney 84'	Stadium: K-Park; Attendance: 253; Referee: Joel Kennedy

== Squad statistics ==
=== Appearances ===
As of match played 25 January 2025

No.	Pos	Nat	Player	Total		League One		Scottish Cup		League Cup		Challenge Cup	
No.	Pos	Nat	Player	Apps	Goals	Apps	Goals	Apps	Goals	Apps	Goals	Apps	Goals
1	GK	(Australia) AUS	Nicholas Suman	16	0	13	0	2	0	1	0	0	0
2	DF	(Scotland) SCO	Finlay Murray	6	0	3	0	0	0	3	0	0	0
3	DF	(Scotland) SCO	Michael Doyle	28	2	21	1	2	0	4	1	1	0
4	MF	(Scotland) SCO	Connor Scully	28	2	21	1	2	0	4	1	1	0
6	DF	(England) ENG	Will Gillingham	23	0	18	0	1	0	3	0	1	0
7	DF	(Wales) WAL	Ryan Harrington	28	0	21	0	2	0	4	0	1	0
8	MF	(Scotland) SCO	Blair Yule	21	2	15	2	1	0	4	0	1	0
9	FW	(Scotland) SCO	Mitch Megginson	19	10	16	9	2	0	0	0	1	1
10	MF	(Scotland) SCO	Declan Glass	22	4	15	3	2	1	4	0	1	0
11	FW	(Scotland) SCO	Grady McGrath	18	2	12	1	2	1	3	0	1	0
12	DF	(Poland) POL	Milosz Ochmanski	3	0	0	0	0	0	2	0	1	0
14	MF	(Scotland) SCO	Quinn Coulson	1	0	1	0	0	0	0	0	0	0
15	DF	(Scotland) SCO	Arron Darge	25	2	18	2	2	0	4	0	1	0
17	MF	(Scotland) SCO	Findlay Marshall	20	4	18	4	2	0	0	0	0	0
18	MF	(Scotland) SCO	Dylan Lobban	13	0	12	0	1	0	0	0	0	0
19	MF	(Scotland) SCO	Cole Donaldson	0	0	0	0	0	0	0	0	0	0
20	FW	(Scotland) SCO	Myles Gaffney	20	4	15	1	1	1	3	1	1	1
21	GK	(Hungary) HUN	Balint Demus	13	0	9	0	2	0	1	0	1	0
22	FW	(Scotland) SCO	Adam Emslie	23	6	21	5	2	1	0	0	0	0
24	MF	(Scotland) SCO	Fraser Fyvie	21	4	16	4	1	0	3	0	1	0
25	MF	(Scotland) SCO	Mikey Milnes	0	0	0	0	0	0	0	0	0	0
32	DF	(Scotland) SCO	Liam Parker	8	1	8	1	0	0	0	0	0	0
Players away from the club on loan:
23	GK	(Scotland) SCO	Jack Robertson	0	0	0	0	0	0	0	0	0	0
Players who left Cove Rangers during the season:
—	DF	(Scotland) SCO	Josh Kerr	2	0	0	0	0	0	2	0	0	0
—	DF	(Scotland) SCO	Luke Strachan	1	0	0	0	0	0	1	0	0	0
—	MF	(Scotland) SCO	Mark Gallagher	3	0	0	0	0	0	3	0	0	0
—	MF	(Scotland) SCO	Reuben McAllister	9	0	8	0	1	0	0	0	0	0

=== Goal scorers ===
As of match played 25 January 2025

Ranking	Nation	Position	Number	Name	Scottish League One	Scottish Cup	Scottish League Cup	Scottish Challenge Cup	Total
1	(Scotland)	FW	9	Mitch Megginson	9	0	0	1	10
2	(Scotland)	FW	22	Adam Emslie	5	1	0	0	6
3	(Scotland)	MF	24	Fraser Fyvie	4	0	0	0	4
3	(Scotland)	MF	34	Findlay Marshall	4	0	0	0	4
3	(Scotland)	MF	10	Declan Glass	3	1	0	0	4
3	(Scotland)	FW	20	Myles Gaffney	1	1	1	1	4
6	(Scotland)	FW	8	Blair Yule	2	0	0	0	2
6	(Scotland)	DF	15	Arron Darge	2	0	0	0	2
6	(Scotland)	MF	4	Connor Scully	1	0	1	0	2
6	(Scotland)	FW	11	Grady McGrath	1	1	0	0	2
6	(Scotland)	DF	3	Michael Doyle	1	0	1	0	2
11	(Scotland)	DF	32	Liam Parker	1	0	0	0	1
TOTALS					34	4	3	2	43
