= 2025–26 Cove Rangers F.C. season =

Cove Rangers season

Cove Rangers
2025–26 season
- Chairman: Keith Moorhouse
- Manager: Paul Hartley
- Stadium: Balmoral Stadium (Capacity: 2,602)
- League One: 7th
- Scottish Cup: Fourth round
- League Cup: Group Stage
- Challenge Cup: Round of 32
- Top goalscorer: League: Mitch Megginson (12); All: Mitch Megginson (17)
- Highest home attendance: 811 vs. Falkirk (19 July 2025)
- Lowest home attendance: 164 vs. Hibernian B (23 September 2025)
Home colours	Away colours	Third colours

The 2025–26 season is Cove Rangers's third consecutive season in the third tier of Scottish football, having been relegated from the Scottish Championship at the end of the 2022–23 season.

== Season review ==
=== May ===
On 22 May 2025, Cove Rangers announced the departure of club legend Connor Scully. 6 days later, Cove announced the departure of Myles Gaffney, Finlay Murray and Nick Suman following the expiration of their contracts, and Adam Emslie, Dylan Lobban, Findlay Marshall and Liam Parker returned to their parent clubs.

=== June ===
On the 12th June, William Gillingham left the club, Blair Yule signed a new contract, as did Michael Doyle. Declan Glass signed a new contract 4 days later. Goalkeeper Balint Demus left the club one day later on June 17. 9 days later, Cove made their first signing of the new season with Robbie Mutch joining. Two days later, Cove made a triple signing with Liam Parker, David Eguaibor and Layton Bisland all joining the club.

=== July ===
On the 11th July Balint Demus returned despite being on trial with Dunfermline Athletic. On the same day, Mackenzie Strachan joined the club having featured in pre season friendlies as a trialist. On the 12th, Cove played Aberdeen in a friendly in front of a record crowd at Balmoral, losing 2–0. On the 13th July, Jack Robertson was loaned out to Rothes. On the 18th July, Cove signed Justin Eguaibor. A day later, Cove secured a 0–0 draw against Scottish Premiership side Falkirk in the League Cup, however, they lost on penalties and failed to gain a bonus point. A week later, Cove were knocked out of the League Cup following a 2–1 defeat to Queen's Park in the final group game.

=== August ===
On August 15, Cove agreed a co-operation agreement with St Johnstone and signed Jackson Mylchreest on loan as part of this agreement.

=== September ===
On the 4th September, Cove signed Lewis O'Donnell from Dundee United on a loan deal until January, a much needed signing with Cove having just 2 players on the bench for their league game against Hamilton Academical 5 days prior. On the 26th September, Adam Emslie returned on loan from Ross County, while Milosz Ochmanski left the club to join Inverurie Locos.

=== October ===
On October 16, Reuben McAllister returned to the club. On the 25th October, Cove finally secured this first win in the league, a 3–0 triumph against Montrose.

=== November ===
On the 22nd November, Chris Maguire made his debut against Alloa Athletic but this wasn't announced until the 29th where Greg Stewart was also announced. On the same day, Cove upset St Johnstone securing a 2–1 win after extra time at McDiarmid Park.

=== December ===
On the 16th December, Cove were knocked out of the Challenge Cup after losing 2–1 at home to Partick Thistle.

=== January ===
On the 23rd January, Cove entered a co-operation agreement with Aberdeen. As part of this agreement three players joined on a co-operation loan, Joseph Teasdale, Cooper Masson and Lewis Carrol.

== Squad ==
As of 16 December 2025

No.	Name	Nationality	Position	Apps.	Goals
Goalkeepers
1	Robbie Mutch	(Scotland)	GK	21	0
21	Balint Demus	(Hungary)	GK	42	0
Defenders
2	Layton Bisland	(Scotland)	DF	27	1
3	Michael Doyle	(Scotland)	DF	96	3
6	Justin Eguaibor	(Republic of Ireland)	DF	25	0
7	Ryan Harrington	(Wales)	DF	76	3
15	Arron Darge	(Scotland)	DF	92	3
32	Liam Parker	(Scotland)	DF	52	1
Midfielders
4	MacKenzie Strachan	(Scotland)	MF	28	0
8	Blair Yule	(Scotland)	MF	246	14
10	Declan Glass	(Scotland)	MF	73	13
17	Reuben McAllister	(Scotland)	MF	20	1
22	Lewis O'Donnell	(Scotland)	MF	17	2
24	Fraser Fyvie	(Scotland)	MF	164	30
25	Mikey Milnes	(Scotland)	MF	4	0
26	Greg Stewart	(Scotland)	MF	2	0
Forwards
9	Mitch Megginson	(Scotland)	FW	395	236
14	Jackson Mylchreest	(Scotland)	FW	15	2
18	Adam Emslie	(Scotland)	FW	52	16
20	David Eguaibor	(Republic of Ireland)	FW	28	11
77	Chris Maguire	(Scotland)	FW	5	0
Loaned out
11	Grady McGrath	(Scotland)	FW	30	2
19	Cole Donaldson	(Scotland)	MF	7	0
23	Jack Robertson	(Scotland)	GK	0	0
Players who left during the season
—	Milozs Ochmanski	(Poland)	DF	10	0

== Transfers ==
=== In ===
Date	Position	Nationality	Name	From	Fee
25 June 2025	GK	(Scotland)	Robbie Mutch	Unattached	Free
27 June 2025	DF	(Scotland)	Liam Parker	Unattached	Free
27 June 2025	FW	(Republic of Ireland)	David Eguaibor	Unattached	Free
27 June 2025	DF	(Scotland)	Layton Bisland	Unattached	Free
11 July 2025	GK	(Hungary)	Balint Demus	Unattached	Free
11 July 2025	MF	(Scotland)	MacKenzie Strachan	Unattached	Free
18 July 2025	DF	(Republic of Ireland)	Justin Eguaibor	Unattached	Free
16 October 2025	MF	(Scotland)	Reuben McAllister	Unattached	Free
29 November 2025	FW	(Scotland)	Chris Maguire	Unattached	Free
29 November 2025	MF	(Scotland)	Greg Stewart	Unattached	Free

=== Loans in ===
Date	Position	Nationality	Name	From	Date to
15 August 2025	FW	(Scotland)	Jackson Mylchreest	St Johnstone	1 January 2026
4 September 2025	MF	(Scotland)	Lewis O'Donnell	Dundee United	End of season
26 September 2025	FW	(Scotland)	Adam Emslie	Ross County	End of season
23 January 2026	FW	(Scotland)	Cooper Masson	Aberdeen	End of season
23 January 2026	MF	(Scotland)	Joseph Teasdale	Aberdeen	End of season
23 January 2026	DF	(Scotland)	Lewis Carroll	Aberdeen	End of season

=== Out ===
Date	Position	Nationality	Name	To	Fee
26 September 2025	DF	(Poland)	Milosz Ochmanski	Inverurie Locos	Undisclosed
2 February 2026	DF	(Scotland)	Michael Doyle	Dumbarton	Undisclosed

=== Loans out ===
Date	Position	Nationality	Name	To	Date to
13 July 2025	GK	(Scotland)	Jack Robertson	Rothes	End of season
25 July 2025	FW	(Scotland)	Grady McGrath	Brechin City	End of season
21 November 2025	MF	(Scotland)	Cole Donaldson	Buckie Thistle	End of season

== Friendlies ==
28 July 2025	Cove Rangers	3-1	Banks O'Dee	Aberdeen
	Trialist 33'; Trialist 69'; McGrath 85'		Alexander 44'	Stadium: Balmoral Stadium

1 July 2025	Cove Rangers	4-1	Inverurie Locos	Aberdeen
15:00	62'; 80'; 83'; 88'		Bolton 38'	Stadium: Balmoral Stadium

5 July 2025	Cove Rangers	6-0	Turriff United	Aberdeen
13:00	Glass 8', 17'; Fyvie 29'; McGrath 38'; D. Eguaibor 51'; Megginson 57'			Stadium: Balmoral Stadium

12th July 2025	Cove Rangers	0-2	Aberdeen	Aberdeen
13:00			Devlin 33'; Palaversa 90'	Stadium: Balmoral Stadium

== Competitions ==
=== Overview ===
Competition	First match	Last match	Starting round	Final position	Record							
Competition	First match	Last match	Starting round	Final position	Pld	W	D	L	GF	GA	GD	Win %
League One	2 August 2024	2 May 2025	Matchday 1	7th	36	9	11	16	41	44	−3	25.00
Scottish Cup	29 November 2025	17 January 2026	Third Round	Fourth Round	2	1	0	1	3	2	+1	50.00
League Cup	15 July 2025	26 July 2025	Group Stage	Group Stage	4	2	1	1	5	2	+3	50.00
Challenge Cup	12 August 2025	16 December 2025	Group stage	Round of 32	7	2	2	3	10	8	+2	28.57
Total					49	14	14	21	59	56	+3	28.57

Last updated: 2 May 2026

=== League One ===
==== League table ====
Pos	Team	Pld	W	D	L	GF	GA	GD	Pts	Promotion, qualification or relegation
5	Peterhead	36	12	7	17	48	64	−16	43	
6	Montrose	36	11	9	16	48	67	−19	42	
7	Cove Rangers	36	9	11	16	41	44	−3	38	
8	East Fife	36	9	9	18	34	61	−27	36	
9	Hamilton Academical (O)	36	16	7	13	54	42	+12	34 (Note: Hamilton Academical were deducted six points for breaching SPFL rules regarding amateur players, a further nine points for failing to hold at least a bronze level licence and then six more points for failing to pay players' wages on time.)	Qualification for the League One play-offs

Rules for classification: 1) Points; 2) Goal difference; 3) Goals scored; 4) Head-to-head points; 5) Head-to-head goal difference; 6) Play-off (only for deciding promotion, play-off participation and relegation).
(O) Play-off winners

==== Results summary ====
Overall								Home						Away					
Pld	W	D	L	GF	GA	GD	Pts	W	D	L	GF	GA	GD	W	D	L	GF	GA	GD
36	9	11	16	41	44	−3	38	4	7	7	17	20	−3	5	4	9	24	24	0

Last updated: 2 May 2026.
Source: SPFL

==== Results ====
2 August 2025 1	Cove Rangers	0-2	Queen of the South	Aberdeen
15:00	Darge (yellow card) 12'; Parker (yellow card) 39'; Yule (yellow card) 55'; Doyle (yellow card) 82'; Bisland (yellow card) 87'		Guthrie 19'; Kennedy (yellow card) 41', (goal) 80'; Stewart (yellow card) 68'	Stadium: Balmoral Stadium; Attendance: 402; Referee: (Scotland) Joel Kennedy

9 August 2025 2	Stenhousemuir	1-0	Cove Rangers	Stenhousemuir
15:00	Carrick 6'; Meechan (yellow card) 78'		Darge (yellow card) 49'; Doyle (yellow card) 72'; Doherty (yellow card) 73'; D. Eguaibor (yellow card) 88'	Stadium: Ochilview Park; Attendance: 429; Referee: (Scotland) Graham Grainger

16 August 2025 3	Cove Rangers	3-3	Montrose	Aberdeen
15:00	D. Eguaibor 8', 42', (yellow card) 59', (goal) 90+4'; Yule (yellow card) 55'; Bisland (yellow card) 64'; Mylchreest (yellow card) 86'		Loudon 5', 68'; Bertie (red card) 22'; Smith (yellow card) 47'; Sandilands 56'	Stadium: Balmoral Stadium; Attendance: 431; Referee: (Scotland) Duncan Nicolson

23 August 2025 4	Peterhead	3-1	Cove Rangers	Peterhead
15:00	Barry 10'; Shanks 26'; Smith (yellow card) 72'; Brown 79'; Forrest (yellow card) 86'		Doyle (yellow card) 13'; Bisland (yellow card) 52'; D. Eguaibor 62'; Yule (yellow card) 67', (red card) 72'; Megginson (yellow card) 72'	Stadium: Balmoor Stadium; Attendance: 897; Referee: (Scotland) Daniel Graves

30 August 2025 5	Hamilton Academical	0-0	Cove Rangers	Cumbernauld
17:30			Megginson (yellow card) 73'	Stadium: Broadwood Stadium; Attendance: 238; Referee: (Scotland) Ross Nelson

13 September 2025 6	Cove Rangers	0-1	Inverness Caledonian Thistle	Aberdeen
17:30	Mylchreest (yellow card) 22'; Megginson (yellow card) 45'; Parker (yellow card) 86'; D. Eguaibor (yellow card) 90+6'		MacLeod 66'; Stewart (yellow card) 80'; Sole (yellow card) 90+4'	Stadium: Balmoral Stadium; Attendance: 456; Referee: (Scotland) Alistair Grieve

20 September 2025 7	Alloa Athletic	2-1	Cove Rangers	Alloa
15:00	Roberts 11'; Devine 37'; Hetherington (yellow card) 89'		Megginson 69'; Doyle (yellow card) 87'; D. Eguaibor (yellow card) 90+2'	Stadium: Indodrill Stadium; Attendance: 513; Referee: (Scotland) Graham Grainger

27 September 2025 8	Cove Rangers	0-2	Kelty Hearts	Aberdeen
15:00	J. Eguaibor (yellow card) 2'; Parker (yellow card) 22'; Darge (yellow card) 33'		Murray 2' (pen.); Diack (yellow card) 31'; Clay (yellow card) 60'; Adamson (yellow card) 88'; Teasdale 90'; Carrol (yellow card) 90+1'	Stadium: Balmoral Stadium; Attendance: 376; Referee: (Scotland) Josh Hay

4 October 2025 9	East Fife	2-0	Cove Rangers	Methil
15:00	Millar 5'; Munro (yellow card) 51'; McKenna 87'		Darge (yellow card) 82'	Stadium: Bayview Stadium; Attendance: 620; Referee: (Scotland) Gary Hanvidge

18 October 2025 10	Cove Rangers	0-1	Stenhousemuir	Aberdeen
15:00	Megginson (yellow card) 43'; Parker (yellow card) 47'; Bisland (yellow card) 81'; O'Donnell (yellow card) 90'		Bilham (yellow card) 2'; Aitken 48' (pen.); Carrick (yellow card) 55'; McGill (yellow card) 84'	Stadium: Balmoral Stadium; Attendance: 347; Referee: (Scotland) George Calder

25 October 2025 11	Montrose	0-3	Cove Rangers	Montrose
15:00			Bisland 43', (yellow card) 89'; D. Eguaibor 58'; O'Donnell 73'	Stadium: Links Park; Attendance: 593; Referee: (Scotland) Stewart Luke

1 November 2025 12	Cove Rangers	1-2	Peterhead	Aberdeen
15:00	O'Donnell 30'; Yule (yellow card) 65'; Parker (yellow card) 90+3'		Jack Brown 7'; Jason Brown (yellow card) 63'; Smith 71'; Barry (yellow card) 79'; Goldie (yellow card) 81'	Stadium: Balmoral Stadium; Attendance: 621; Referee: (Scotland) Cameron Stirling

8 November 2025 13	Inverness Caledonian Thistle	1-0	Cove Rangers	Inverness
15:00	Robertson 18'		Yule (yellow card) 33'	Stadium: Caledonian Stadium; Attendance: 2,102; Referee: (Scotland) Gary Hanvidge

15 November 2025 14	Cove Rangers	2-1	Hamilton Academical	Aberdeen
15:00	D. Eguaibor 38'; Megginson 43', (yellow card) 58'		Shaw 40'	Stadium: Balmoral Stadium; Attendance: 463; Referee: (Scotland) Alastair Mather

22 November 2025 15	Cove Rangers	0-0	Alloa Athletic	Aberdeen
15:00	Bisland (yellow card) 22'; O'Donnell (yellow card) 59'; Yule (yellow card) 62'; Megginson (yellow card) 69'		Scougall (yellow card) 16'	Stadium: Balmoral Stadium; Attendance: 467; Referee: (Scotland) Joel Kennedy

6 December 2025 16	Queen of the South	1-1	Cove Rangers	Dumfries
15:00	Douglas 88'		Emslie 43'; Harrington (yellow card) 52'; Yule (yellow card) 75'	Stadium: Palmerston Park; Attendance: 665; Referee: (Scotland) Iain Snedden

13 December 2025 17	Cove Rangers	0-1	East Fife	Aberdeen
15:00			Nicol 85'	Stadium: Balmoral Stadium; Attendance: 652; Referee: (Scotland) Josh Hay

20 December 2025 18	Kelty Hearts	2-5	Cove Rangers	Kelty
15:00	O'Ware 19', (yellow card) 90'; Diack 32', (yellow card) 79'		Emslie 8'; Harrington (yellow card) 37'; Doyle 67'; Megginson 76', 85'; O'Donnell 82'	Stadium: New Central Park; Referee: (Scotland) Duncan Williams

27 December 2025 19	Peterhead	0-4	Cove Rangers	Peterhead
15:00	Brown (yellow card) 69'; Forrest (yellow card) 81'		Megginson 3', 69' (pen.); O'Donnell 30'; Maguire 77'; J. Eguaibor (yellow card) 81'	Stadium: Balmoor Stadium; Attendance: 906; Referee: (Scotland) Jamie Wilkie

10 January 2026 21	Cove Rangers	0-0	Inverness Caledonian Thistle	Aberdeen
15:00	Parker (yellow card) 21'; Maguire (yellow card) 70'; D. Eguaibor (yellow card) 90+4'		Savage (yellow card) 90+4'	Stadium: Balmoral Stadium; Attendance: 575; Referee: (Scotland) Jordan Curran

24 January 2026 22	Hamilton Academical	2-0	Cove Rangers	Cumbernauld
15:00	Shaw 68'; MacDonald 83'; Bradley (yellow card) 85'		Harrington (yellow card) 54'; Doyle (yellow card) 77'	Stadium: Broadwood Stadium; Referee: (Scotland) Euan Anderson

31 January 2026 23	Alloa Athletic	2-2	Cove Rangers	Alloa
15:00	Gentles 8'; Donnelly 90+3'		Parker (yellow card) 63'; Emslie 83'; Megginson 85'	Stadium: Indodrill Stadium; Attendance: 509; Referee: (Scotland) Gary Hanvidge

7 February 2026 24	Cove Rangers	1-1	Queen of the South	Aberdeen
15:00	Yule (yellow card) 21'; Fyvie (yellow card) 35'; Parker (yellow card) 51'; O'Donnell (yellow card) 67'; Megginson 71'; Carrol (yellow card) 83'		Kennedy 2'; Douglas (yellow card) 16'; Lyon (yellow card) 45'; Guthrie (yellow card) 63'; Dickenson (yellow card) 83'	Stadium: Balmoral Stadium; Attendance: 516; Referee: (Scotland) Peter Stuart

14 February 2026 25	East Fife	2-1	Cove Rangers	Methil
15:00	Munro 56'; Wilson (yellow card) 58'; Oladipo 61'		Megginson 9'	Stadium: Bayview Stadium; Attendance: 576; Referee: (Scotland) George Calder

17 February 2026 20	Cove Rangers	3-1	Montrose	Aberdeen
19:45	O'Donnell 22', 84'; Reuben McAllister 26'; Yule (yellow card) 65'		Steeves (yellow card) 37'; Sandilands 72'	Stadium: Balmoral Stadium; Referee: (Scotland) Colin Steven

21 February 2026 26	Cove Rangers	1-1	Kelty Hearts	Aberdeen
15:00	J. Eguaibor (yellow card) 45'; Harrington (yellow card) 72'; Masson 83'		Brydon 43'; Clay (yellow card) 73'; Fisher (yellow card) 80'	Stadium: Balmoral Stadium; Attendance: 440; Referee: (Scotland) Connor Ashwood

28 February 2026 27	Stenhousemuir	1-0	Cove Rangers	Stenhousemuir
15:00	Whyte 32', (yellow card) 51'; Bilham (yellow card) 80'		Darge (yellow card) 11'; O'Donnell (yellow card) 45+1'	Stadium: Ochilview Park; Attendance: 416; Referee: (Scotland) Joel Kennedy

7 March 2026 28	Cove Rangers	2-1	Peterhead	Aberdeen
15:00	Yule 8'; Maguire 66'; Megginson (yellow card) 72'		Smith 22'; Forrest (yellow card) 52'; Jones (yellow card) 84'; Brown (yellow card) 90+4'	Stadium: Balmoral Stadium; Attendance: 695; Referee: (Scotland) Daniel Graves

14 March 2026 29	Inverness CT	1-1	Cove Rangers	Inverness
15:00	Stewart 39'; Savage (yellow card) 80'		Maguire (yellow card) 43'; Darge (yellow card) 90'; Demus 90+4'	Stadium: Caledonian Stadium; Attendance: 1,823; Referee: (Scotland) Jamie McCunnie

21 March 2026 30	Cove Rangers	2-2	Hamilton Academical	Aberdeen
15:00	Teasdale 66'; Maguire 90+1'		Darge 17' (o.g.); Kilday 39'	Stadium: Balmoral Stadium; Referee: (Scotland) Graham Grainger

4 April 2026 32	Cove Rangers	0-1	Alloa Athletic	Aberdeen
15:00	Maguire (yellow card) 55'; Bisland (yellow card) 83'		Stewart (yellow card) 38'; Roberts 52'	Stadium: Balmoral Stadium; Attendance: 240; Referee: (Scotland) Lewis Hogarth

7 April 2026 31	Montrose	2-3	Cove Rangers	Montrose
19:45	Steeves (yellow card) 10'; Stevenson (yellow card) 27'; Sandilands 47'; Gibson 64'		O'Donnell 37'; Megginson 71'; Emslie 82'	Stadium: Links Park; Attendance: 442; Referee: (Scotland) Euan Anderson

11 April 2026 33	Queen of the South	2-0	Cove Rangers	Dumfries
15:00	Kennedy (yellow card) 42'; Luissint 67'; Lyon 79'		Yule (yellow card) 75'	Stadium: Palmerston Park; Attendance: 838; Referee: (Scotland) Greg Soutar

18 April 2026 34	Cove Rangers	2-0	Stenhousemuir	Aberdeen
15:00	Emslie 10'; Carrol (yellow card) 26'; Megginson 56'		McGill (yellow card) 18'; Grant (yellow card) 23'; Meechan (yellow card) 24'; Bilham (yellow card) 51'; Jamieson (yellow card) 74'	Stadium: Balmoral Stadium; Attendance: 325; Referee: (Scotland) Grant Irvine

25 April 2026 35	Kelty Hearts	0-2	Cove Rangers	Kelty
15:00	Pettifer (yellow card) 58'; Cooper (yellow card) 68'; Ferguson (yellow card) 74'		Emslie 11'; Megginson 30', (yellow card) 79'; Yule (yellow card) 85'	Stadium: New Central Park; Attendance: 370; Referee: (Scotland) Joel Kennedy

2 May 2026 36	Cove Rangers	0-0	East Fife	Aberdeen
15:00				Stadium: Balmoral Stadium; Attendance: 650; Referee: (Scotland) Euan Anderson

=== Scottish Cup ===
29 November 2025 Third round	St Johnstone	1-2 (a.e.t.)	Cove Rangers	Perth
15:00	Ikpeazu 24'; McPake (yellow card) 72'		Megginson 73', (yellow card) 83'; Emslie 100'	Stadium: McDiarmid Park; Attendance: 2,024; Referee: (Scotland) Chris Graham

17 January 2026 Fourth round	Kelty Hearts	1-1 (a.e.t.) (5-3 p)	Cove Rangers	Kelty
15:00	Clay (yellow card) 39', (red card) 118'; J. Eguaibor 62' (o.g.); Graham (yellow card) 90+3'		Strachan (yellow card) 28'; Megginson 42', (yellow card) 117'; Doyle (yellow card) 90+1'; Darge (yellow card) 90+3'; D. Eguaibor (yellow card) 98'	Stadium: New Central Park; Attendance: 393; Referee: (Scotland) Dan McFarlane
	Penalties
	Moore (penalty scored); Pettifer (penalty scored); Arnott (penalty scored); Graham (penalty scored); Fisher (penalty scored)		Megginson (penalty scored); Yule (penalty scored); D. Eguaibor (penalty missed); Emslie (penalty scored)

=== League Cup ===
==== Group stage ====
Pos	Team	Pld	W	PW	PL	L	GF	GA	GD	Pts	Qualification	FAL	COV	QPA	SPA	BRE
1	Falkirk	4	3	1	0	0	14	1	+13	11	Qualification for the second round	—	—	3–1	4–0	—
2	Cove Rangers	4	2	0	1	1	5	2	+3	7		0–0p	—	—	1–0	—
3	Queen's Park	4	2	0	0	2	9	6	+3	6		—	2–1	—	—	5–0
4	The Spartans	4	2	0	0	2	4	6	−2	6		—	—	2–1	—	2–0
5	Brechin City	4	0	0	0	4	0	17	−17	0		0–7	0–3	—	—	—

Rules for classification: 1) goal difference, 2) goals scored, 3) away goals scored, 4) matches won, 5) away matches won, 6) drawing of lots.

==== Results ====
15 July 2025 1	Cove Rangers	1-0	Spartans	Aberdeen
19:45	Glass 5', (yellow card) 87'; D. Eguaibor (yellow card) 64', (red card) 89'		Nair (yellow card) 58'; Watson (yellow card) 90+6'	Stadium: Balmoral Stadium; Attendance: 321; Referee: (Scotland) Jordan Curran

19 July 2025 2	Cove Rangers	0-0 (2-4 p)	Falkirk	Aberdeen
15:00			Cartwright (yellow card) 78'	Stadium: Balmoral Stadium; Attendance: 811; Referee: (Scotland) Grant Irvine
	Penalties
	Glass (penalty missed); Donaldson (penalty scored); Parker (penalty missed); Harrington (penalty scored)		Henderson (penalty scored); MacIver (penalty scored); Spencer (penalty scored); Oliver (penalty scored)

22 July 2025 3	Brechin	0-3	Cove Rangers	Brechin
19:45	Sheridan (yellow card) 71'		D. Eguaibor 9', 37'; Parker (yellow card) 34'; Megginson 44'	Stadium: Glebe Park; Attendance: 353; Referee: (Scotland) Graham McNellie

26 July 2025 4	Queen's Park	2-1	Cove Rangers	Glasgow
15:00	Ruth 20' (pen.); Fowler 90+1'; Waugh (yellow card) 90+5'		Megginson 15'; Darge (yellow card) 30'; Strachan (yellow card) 81'	Stadium: Lesser Hampden; Attendance: 453; Referee: (Scotland) Daniel Graves

=== Scottish Challenge Cup ===
==== Group stage ====
Pos	Team	Pld	W	D	L	GF	GA	GD	Pts	Qualification
17	Hamilton Academical	6	3	1	2	13	8	+5	9 (Note: Hamilton Academical were deducted 1 point for breaching SPFL rules regarding amateur players.)	Advance to Second round
18	Stirling Albion	6	3	0	3	9	9	0	9	Advance to Second round
19	Cove Rangers	6	2	2	2	9	6	+3	8	Advance to Second round
20	Peterhead	6	2	2	2	10	10	0	8	Advance to Second round
21	Celtic B	6	2	0	4	12	15	−3	6	Advance to Second round

Source: SPFL
Rules for classification: 1) Points; 2) Goal difference; 3) Goals scored; 4) Head-to-to head points; 5) Head-to-head goal difference; 6) Play-off (only for deciding qualification).

==== Results ====
12 August 2025 1	Cove Rangers	1-1	Spartans	Aberdeen
19:45	Yule (yellow card) 41'; Darge 56', (yellow card) 87'; Parker (yellow card) 70'; Harrington (yellow card) 75'; Doyle (yellow card) 90'; Megginson (yellow card) 90+3'		Walls (yellow card) 17'; Dall (yellow card) 42'; Stowe 81'	Stadium: Balmoral Stadium; Attendance: 256; Referee: (Scotland) Sean Murdoch

26 August 2025 2	Cove Rangers	1-0	Dundee B	Aberdeen
19:45	Yule (yellow card) 39'; D. Eguaibor 70'		Baird (yellow card) 16'; Allan (yellow card) 39'; Rooney (yellow card) 81'	Stadium: Balmoral Stadium; Attendance: 153; Referee: (Scotland) Lewis Hogarth

6 September 2025 3	Elgin	1-0	Cove Rangers	Elgin
15:00	Walker 30'; Virtanen (yellow card) 72'		Bisland (yellow card) 40'; D. Eguaibor (yellow card) 56'; Doyle (yellow card) 83'	Stadium: Borough Briggs; Attendance: 475; Referee: (Scotland) Stewart Luke

23 September 2025 4	Cove Rangers	1-1	Hibernian B	Aberdeen
19:45	Harrington 73'		Cleland 53'; Bruce (yellow card) 67'	Stadium: Balmoral Stadium; Attendance: 164; Referee: (Scotland) Chris Gentles

11 October 2025 5	Cove Rangers	5-1	Dundee United B	Aberdeen
15:00	Mylchreest 22', 74'; Megginson 25'; D. Eguaibor 30', 48'		Buchanan (yellow card) 57'; Leiper 72'	Stadium: Balmoral Stadium; Attendance: 248; Referee: (Scotland) Daniel Graves

11 November 2025 6	Cove Rangers	1-2	Forfar Athletic	Aberdeen
19:45	Reuben McAllister 65', (yellow card) 87'; Parker (yellow card) 90+3'		Whatley 13', 36'; Dolzanski (yellow card) 34'; Mailer (yellow card) 86'; McLinden (yellow card) 90+1'	Stadium: Balmoral Stadium; Attendance: 154; Referee: (Scotland) George Calder

==== Knockout phase ====
16 December 2025 Round of 32	Cove Rangers	1-2	Partick Thistle	Aberdeen
19:45	Emslie 3'; Maguire (yellow card) 67'		Turner 24'; Samuel 27'	Stadium: Balmoral Stadium; Attendance: 389; Referee: (Scotland) Alistair Mather

== Squad statistics ==
=== Appearances ===
As of match played 2 May 2026

No.	Pos	Nat	Player	Total		League One		Scottish Cup		League Cup		Challenge Cup	
No.	Pos	Nat	Player	Apps	Goals	Apps	Goals	Apps	Goals	Apps	Goals	Apps	Goals
1	GK	(Scotland) SCO	Robbie Mutch	33	0	28	0	2	0	3	0	0	0
21	GK	(Hungary) HUN	Balint Demus	16	1	8	1	0	0	1	0	7	0
2	DF	(Scotland) SCO	Layton Bisland	41	1	28	1	2	0	4	0	7	0
6	DF	(Republic of Ireland) IRL	Justin Eguaibor	37	0	25	0	2	0	3	0	7	0
7	DF	(Wales) WAL	Ryan Harrington	48	1	36	0	2	0	3	0	7	1
15	DF	(Scotland) SCO	Arron Darge	32	1	25	0	1	0	4	0	2	1
26	DF	(Scotland) SCO	Lewis Carrol	8	0	8	0	0	0	0	0	0	0
32	DF	(Scotland) SCO	Liam Parker	47	0	35	0	1	0	4	0	7	0
4	MF	(Scotland) SCO	MacKenzie Strachan	34	0	21	0	2	0	4	0	7	0
8	MF	(Scotland) SCO	Blair Yule	43	1	33	1	2	0	1	0	7	0
10	MF	(Scotland) SCO	Declan Glass	7	1	3	0	0	0	4	1	0	0
14	MF	(Scotland) SCO	Cooper Masson	14	1	14	1	0	0	0	0	0	0
17	MF	(Scotland) SCO	Reuben McAllister	25	2	22	1	1	0	0	0	2	1
22	MF	(Scotland) SCO	Lewis O'Donnell	37	7	31	7	2	0	0	0	4	0
25	MF	(Scotland) SCO	Mikey Milnes	4	0	1	0	0	0	0	0	3	0
26	MF	(Scotland) SCO	Greg Stewart	2	0	1	0	1	0	0	0	0	0
9	FW	(Scotland) SCO	Mitch Megginson	39	17	30	12	2	2	4	2	3	1
16	FW	(Scotland) SCO	Joseph Teasdale	12	1	12	1	0	0	0	0	0	0
18	FW	(Scotland) SCO	Adam Emslie	32	8	28	6	2	1	0	0	2	1
20	FW	(Republic of Ireland) IRL	David Eguaibor	42	11	30	6	2	0	3	2	7	3
77	FW	(Scotland) SCO	Chris Maguire	24	3	21	3	2	0	0	0	1	0
Loaned out:
11	FW	(Scotland) SCO	Grady McGrath	3	0	0	0	0	0	3	0	0	0
19	MF	(Scotland) SCO	Cole Donaldson	7	0	2	0	0	0	2	0	3	0
23	GK	(Scotland) SCO	Jack Robertson	0	0	0	0	0	0	0	0	0	0
Players who left Cove during the season:
3	DF	(Scotland) SCO	Michael Doyle	25	1	15	1	2	0	4	0	4	0
12	DF	(Poland) POL	Milozs Ochmanski	7	0	1	0	0	0	2	0	4	0
14	FW	(Scotland) SCO	Jackson Mylchreest	15	2	10	0	0	0	0	0	5	2
24	MF	(Scotland) SCO	Fraser Fyvie	7	0	5	0	1	0	1	0	0	0

=== Goal scorers ===
As of 18 April 2026

Rank	Position	Nation	Squad number	Name	League One	Scottish Cup	League Cup	Challenge Cup	Total
1	FW	(Scotland)	9	Mitch Megginson	12	2	2	1	17
2	FW	(Republic of Ireland)	20	David Eguaibor	6	0	2	3	11
3	FW	(Scotland)	18	Adam Emslie	6	1	0	1	8
4	MF	(Scotland)	22	Lewis O'Donnell	7	0	0	0	7
5	FW	(Scotland)	77	Chris Maguire	3	0	0	0	3
6	MF	(Scotland)	17	Reuben McAllister	1	0	0	1	2
6	FW	(Scotland)	14	Jackson Mylchreest	0	0	0	2	2
7	FW	(Scotland)	16	Joseph Teasdale	1	0	0	0	1
7	MF	(Scotland)	8	Blair Yule	1	0	0	0	1
7	MF	(Scotland)	14	Cooper Masson	1	0	0	0	1
7	DF	(Scotland)	2	Layton Bisland	1	0	0	0	1
7	DF	(Scotland)	3	Michael Doyle	1	0	0	0	1
7	GK	(Hungary)	21	Balint Demus	1	0	0	0	1
7	MF	(Scotland)	10	Declan Glass	0	0	1	0	1
7	DF	(Wales)	7	Ryan Harrington	0	0	0	1	1
7	DF	(Scotland)	15	Arron Darge	0	0	0	1	1
TOTALS					39	3	5	10	57
