= Gillingham =

Gillingham may refer to:

== Places ==
=== United Kingdom ===
- Gillingham, Dorset (/ˈɡɪlɪŋəm/ GHIL-ing-əm)
  - Gillingham railway station (Dorset)
  - Gillingham School, a coeducational school situated in Gillingham in North Dorset, England
  - Gillingham Town F.C. (Dorset), a football club
  - Gillingham (ward), an electoral district
  - Gillingham (liberty), a former administrative division
- Gillingham, Kent (/ˈdʒɪlɪŋəm/ JIL-ing-əm)
  - Gillingham (UK Parliament constituency), existed from 1918 to 2010
  - Gillingham EMU depot, a train maintenance
  - Fort Gillingham, a former fort
  - Gillingham railway station (Kent)
  - Gillingham F.C., a football club
  - Gillingham Town F.C. (Kent), a football club
- Gillingham, Norfolk (/ˈɡɪlɪŋəm/ GHIL-ing-əm)

=== United States ===
- Gillingham, Wisconsin (/ˈɡɪlɪŋhæm/ GHIL-ing-ham)

== People ==
- Gillingham (surname)

== See also ==
- Chillingham
