= William Gillingham =

William Gillingham may refer to:

- William Gillingham I, MP for Rochester (UK Parliament constituency) in 1388
- William Gillingham II, MP for Rochester (UK Parliament constituency) in 1391
- William Gillingham (footballer), footballer born in 1998
