= Michael Doyle (footballer, born 1991) =

Scottish footballer

James Michael Doyle
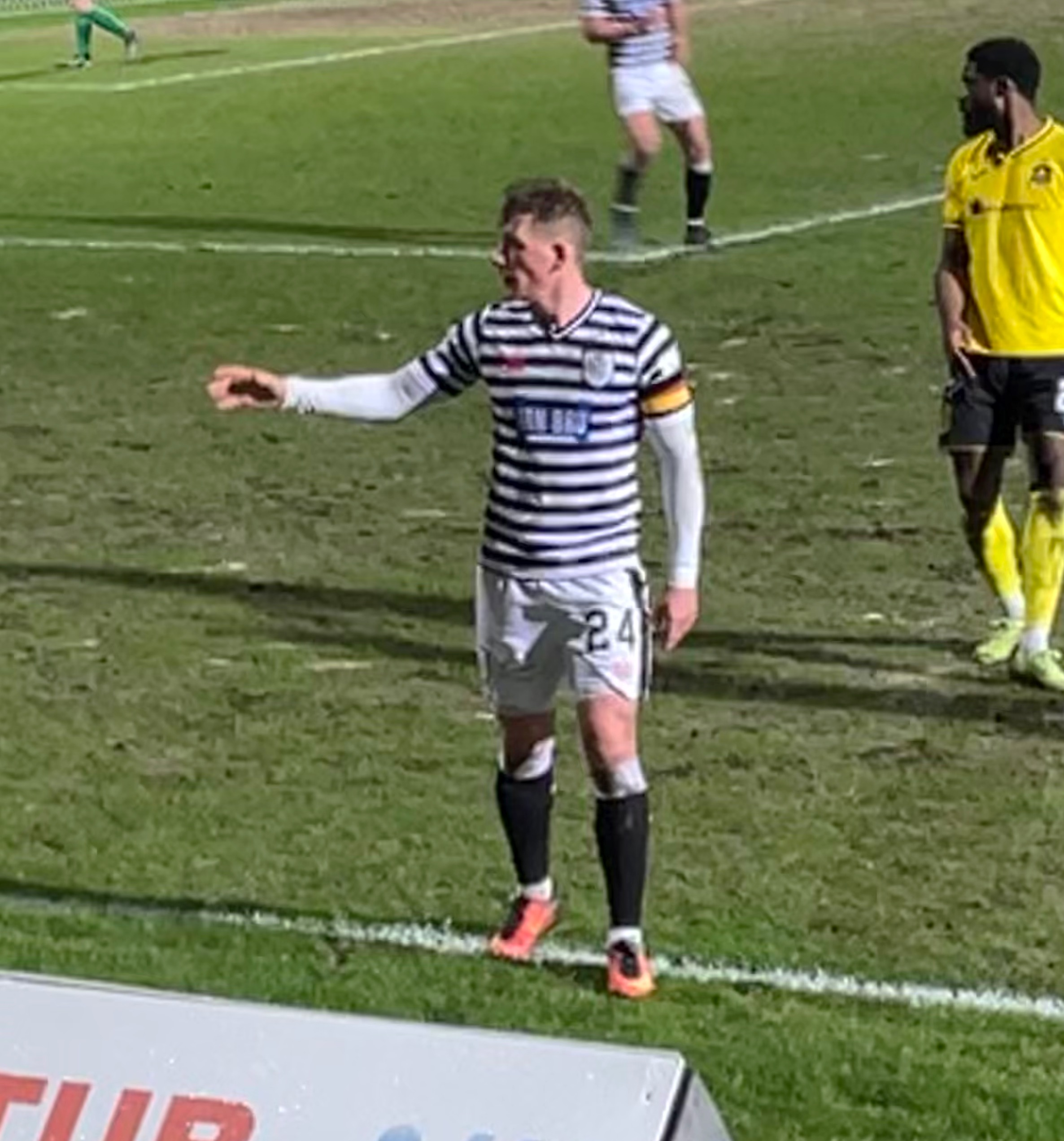

Personal information
- Full name: James Michael Doyle
- Date of birth: 1 August 1991 (age 35)
- Place of birth: Glasgow, Scotland
- Height: 1.83 m (6 ft 0 in)
- Position: Defender

Team information
- Current team: Dumbarton
- Number: 24

Youth career
- 2003–2005: Hamilton Academical
- 2005–2009: Celtic
- 2009–2011: Kilmarnock

Senior career*
Years	Team	Apps	(Gls)
2011	Kilmarnock	0	(0)
2011	→ Stirling Albion (loan)	19	(0)
2011–2016	Alloa Athletic	147	(2)
2016	St Johnstone	2	(0)
2016–2018	Greenock Morton	64	(1)
2018–2019	Queen of the South	35	(2)
2019–2020	Falkirk	28	(3)
2020–2022	Queen's Park	56	(3)
2022–2023	Hamilton Academical	21	(0)
2023	→ Alloa Athletic (loan)	13	(0)
2023–2026	Cove Rangers	77	(2)
2026–	Dumbarton	27	(0)
- * Club domestic league appearances and goals as of 20:22, 14 November 2026 (UTC)

James Michael Doyle (born 1 August 1991) is a Scottish footballer who plays as a defender for Scottish League Two side Dumbarton. His youth career was spent at Celtic, then Kilmarnock, without having made any first-team appearances. Doyle has since played for Alloa Athletic, St Johnstone, Greenock Morton, Queen of the South, Falkirk, Queen's Park, Hamilton Academical and Cove Rangers.

== Career ==
Doyle began his career as a youth player with Celtic before joining Kilmarnock at under-19 level.

=== Stirling Albion ===
In January 2011, Doyle signed on loan for Scottish First Division club Stirling Albion and made his first-team debut on 2 January 2011, in a 4–2 defeat versus Falkirk. Doyle featured in 19 league matches for the Binos.

=== Alloa Athletic ===
On 12 July 2011, Doyle signed for Scottish Third Division club Alloa Athletic after impressing on trial during pre-season. Doyle's first-team debut was on 23 July 2011, versus Peterhead in the Challenge Cup and his league debut was on 6 August 2011, versus Stranraer in a 3–2 win at Stair Park. Doyle scored his first competitive goal on 17 September 2011, versus Queen's Park. Doyle featured in 132 league matches and scored two league goals for the Wasps.

=== St. Johnstone ===
Doyle signed for St Johnstone on 4 February 2016, as cover for club captain, Dave Mackay who had been ruled out for the rest of that season with a hip injury, although he eventually only featured in two league matches.

=== Greenock Morton ===
In May 2016, Doyle signed for Championship club Greenock Morton and although he extended his contract with the Greenock club for a further year, Doyle was then released in the close season of 2018, having featured in 64 league matches and scoring one goal.

=== Queen of the South ===
On 13 July 2018, Doyle signed a one-year contract with Dumfries club Queen of the South after featuring in two pre-season friendly matches at Palmerston Park versus Livingston and Hearts respectively.

=== Falkirk ===
On 21 June 2019, Doyle signed a two-year contract with Scottish League One club Falkirk.

=== Queen's Park ===
On 28 July 2020, Doyle signed for Queen's Park.

=== Hamilton Academical ===
In July 2022 Doyle moved to Hamilton Academical.

In February 2023, Doyle joined Alloa Athletic on loan. He was released by Hamilton at the end of the season.

=== Cove Rangers ===
After several months out with an injury sustained as a trialist, Doyle signed with Cove Rangers in October 2023. He spent two-and-a-half seasons with the club, which included playing every minute of their 2024/25 campaign.

=== Dumbarton ===
Doyle signed for Scottish League Two side Dumbarton on deadline day in February 2026 and was appointed club captain in the summer of 2026 following Mark Durnan's departure.

== Career statistics ==
As of 20:22, 14 November 2026 (UTC)

Club statistics
Club	Season	League			Scottish Cup		League Cup		Other		Total	
Club	Season	Division	Apps	Goals	Apps	Goals	Apps	Goals	Apps	Goals	Apps	Goals
Kilmarnock	2010–11	Scottish Premier League	0	0	0	0	0	0	0	0	0	0
Stirling Albion (loan)	2010–11	Scottish First Division	19	0	0	0	0	0	0	0	19	0
Alloa Athletic	2011–12	Scottish Third Division	36	2	2	0	1	0	1 (Note: Appearances in the Scottish Challenge Cup)	0	40	2
Alloa Athletic	2012–13	Scottish Second Division	27	0	1	0	1	0	5 (Note: One appearance in the Scottish Challenge Cup and four appearances in the Scottish First Division play-offs)	0	34	0
Alloa Athletic	2013–14	Scottish Championship	36	0	2	0	2	0	0	0	40	0
Alloa Athletic	2014–15	Scottish Championship	35	0	3	0	2	0	8 (Note: Five appearances in the Scottish Challenge Cup and three appearances in the Scottish Championship play-offs)	0	48	0
Alloa Athletic	2015–16	Scottish Championship	13	0	1	0	0	0	0	0	14	0
Alloa Athletic	Total		147	2	9	0	6	0	14	0	176	2
St Johnstone	2015–16	Scottish Premiership	2	0	0	0	0	0	0	0	2	0
Greenock Morton	2016–17	Scottish Championship	29	0	2	0	7	0	3 (Note: One appearance in the Scottish Challenge Cup and two appearances in the Scottish Premiership play-offs)	0	41	0
Greenock Morton	2017–18	Scottish Championship	35	1	3	0	4	0	1	0	43	1
Greenock Morton	Total		64	1	5	0	11	0	4	0	84	1
Queen of the South	2018–19	Scottish Championship	35	2	4	0	5	0	7 (Note: Three appearances in the Scottish Challenge Cup and four appearances and one goal in the Scottish Championship play-offs)	1	51	3
Falkirk	2019–20	Scottish League One	28	3	4	0	4	0	1	0	37	3
Queen's Park	2020–21	Scottish League Two	22	1	1	0	4	0	0	0	27	1
Queen's Park	2021–22	Scottish League One	34	2	1	0	4	0	7	0	46	2
Queen's Park	Total		56	3	2	0	8	0	7	0	73	3
Hamilton Academical	2022–23	Scottish Championship	21	0	0	0	3	0	3	0	27	0
Alloa Athletic (loan)	2022–23	Scottish League One	13	0	0	0	0	0	0	0	13	0
Cove Rangers	2023–24	Scottish League One	26	0	3	1	0	0	0	0	29	1
Cove Rangers	2024–25	Scottish League One	36	1	3	0	4	0	5	0	48	2
Cove Rangers	2025–26	Scottish League One	15	1	2	0	4	0	4	0	25	1
Cove Rangers	Total		77	2	8	1	8	0	9	0	102	4
Dumbarton	2025–26	Scottish League Two	13	0	0	0	0	0	0	0	13	0
Dumbarton	2026–27	Scottish League Two	14	0	1	0	4	0	6	0	25	0
Career total			489	13	30	0	55	0	51	1	625	14

== Honours ==
- Scottish Third Division: 2011–12
