= Chillingham =

Chillingham can refer to:

- Chillingham (game), a computer game designed for the visually impaired
- Chillingham, New South Wales, a village in New South Wales, Australia
- Chillingham, Northumberland, a village in Northumberland in the north of England
- Chillingham Castle, an ancient castle in Northumberland, England, near Chillingham
- Chillingham cattle, a herd of rare cattle which have lived for centuries in the grounds of Chillingham Castle, in Northumberland, England
- Chillingham Road Metro station, a metro station in Newcastle upon Tyne, England
- HMS Chillingham, a minesweeper of the British Royal Navy

== See also ==
- Gillingham
