= Gillingham (surname) =

Gillingham is an English surname. Notable people with the surname include:

- Anna Gillingham (1878–1963), educator and psychologist
- Brad Gillingham (born 1970), American world champion powerlifter
- Charlie Gillingham (born 1960), keyboardist and multi-instrumentalist
- David Gillingham (born 1947), contemporary American composer
- Francis Gillingham (1916–2010)
- Francis John Gillingham (1916-2010), pioneering neurosurgeon
- Frank Gillingham (1875–1953), English cricketer. He played for Essex between 1903 and 1928
- Gale Gillingham (1944–2011), American football player
- George Gillingham (died 1668), Canon of Windsor from 1639 to 1668
- Joanie Gillingham (born 1961), Canadian rower
- John Gillingham (born 1940), Medieval historian and emeritus professor of the London School of Economics
- Karl Gillingham (born 1965), American professional strongman and powerlifter
- Martin Gillingham (born 1963), English sports commentator and journalist
- Nick Gillingham (born 1967), British Olympian
- Susan E. Gillingham (born 1951), British theologian
- William Gillingham (disambiguation), multiple people
