= Craig Napier =

Scottish footballer

Personal information
- Date of birth: 14 November 1965 (age 60)
- Place of birth: East Kilbride, Scotland
- Position: Defender

Senior career*
Years	Team	Apps	(Gls)
1984–1988	Clyde	122	(1)
1988–1994	Hamilton Academical	176	(17)
1994–1995	Kilmarnock	18	(0)
1995	Falkirk	4	(0)
1995–1996	Ayr United	10	(0)
Total		330	(18)
- * Club domestic league appearances and goals

Craig Napier (born 14 November 1965) is a Scottish former football defender.

== Career ==
Napier began his career with Clyde, making over 100 appearances in 4 years before moving to Hamilton Academical. He stayed with the Accies for 6 years, before having relatively short spells at Kilmarnock, Falkirk and Ayr United. He retired in 1996.
