= Balmoral Stadium =

Football stadium in Aberdeen, Scotland

- Calder Park
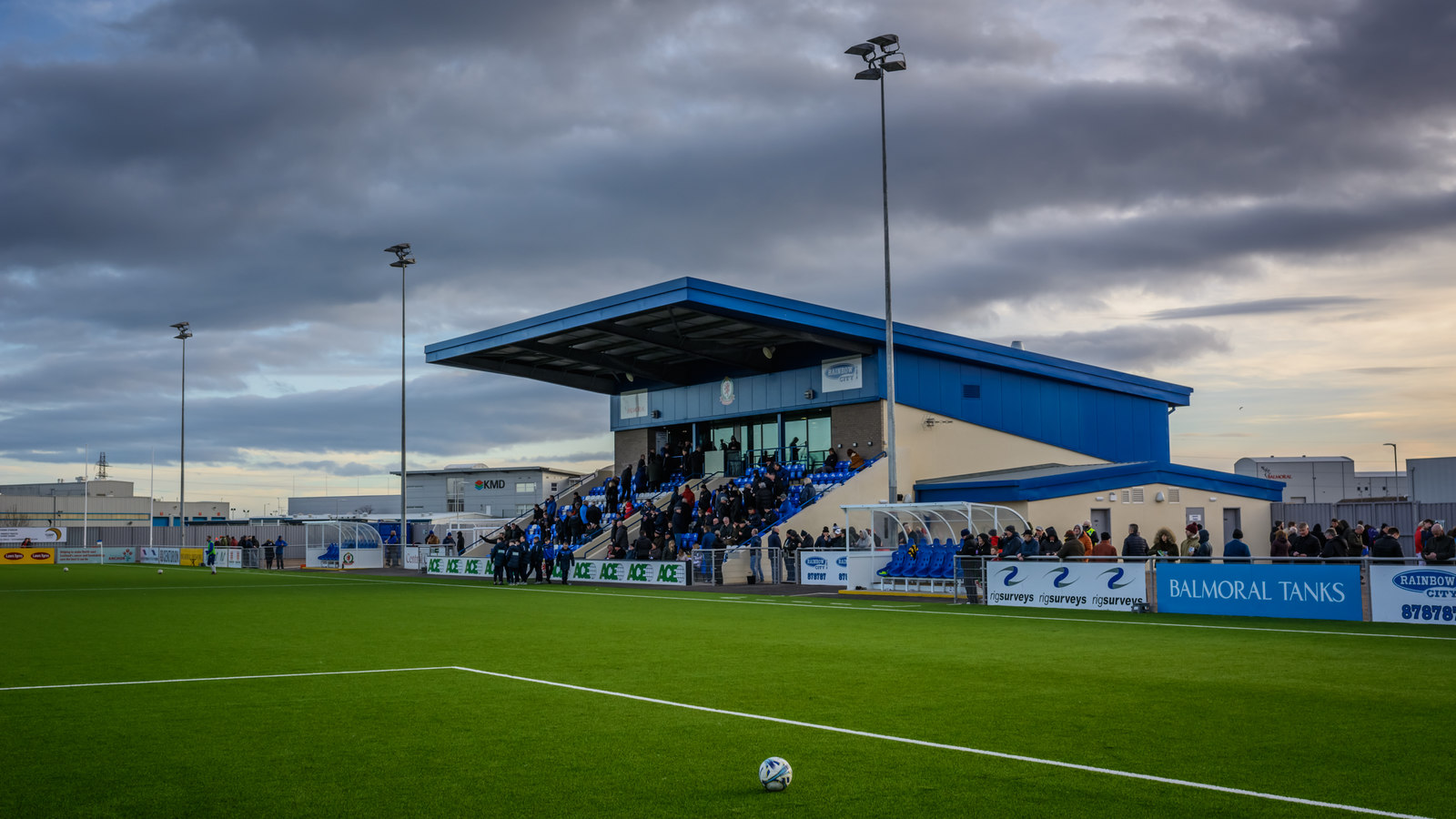

- Location in Aberdeen
- Location: Cove Bay, Aberdeen, Scotland
- Coordinates: 57.113°N 2.097°W
- Capacity: 2,602 (410 seated)
- Surface: Artificial 4G Turf
- Record attendance: 1,955 v Berwick Rangers 11 May 2019
- Field size: 105 x 68 yards

Construction
- Groundbreaking: 2015
- Opened: July 2018

Tenants
- Cove Rangers F.C. (2018–present); Aberdeen F.C. Women (2021–present)

Balmoral Stadium is a football ground located in the Cove Bay area of Aberdeen, Scotland. Opened in 2018, it is the home ground of Scottish League One club Cove Rangers. From 2021, it is being shared by Scottish Women's Premier League team Aberdeen.

== History ==
Cove Rangers started planning to move from their old Allan Park ground in the mid-2000s, as this formed part of their unsuccessful pitch for Scottish Football League membership in 2008. Initially, the move was tied in with the New Aberdeen Stadium proposals, as Calder Park would also have served as a training facility for Aberdeen FC. Planning permission for this project was refused in August 2012, as Aberdeen City Council opted to examine other possibilities for development in the area.

Cove Rangers then decided to press ahead with a new stadium by themselves, as Allan Park did not meet Scottish Football Association licensing criteria. Aberdeen City Council accepted the first stages of planning permission for Calder Park in November 2014. The new stadium was originally planned to be ready for the start of the 2016–17 season. Cove Rangers left Allan Park in April 2015, having sold the ground to a housing developer. The club reached agreements to ground-share with four other clubs during the 2015–16 season.

The club submitted a planning application in March 2016. The plans included a stand with 312 seats, an "all-weather" 3G (artificial) pitch and 110 car parking spaces. A sponsorship deal with the Aberdeen-based Balmoral Group in December 2016 included naming rights for the Calder Park ground, which will be known as the Balmoral Stadium. Construction work was being undertaken in October 2017, with a target date for completion of February to March 2018. Cove continued to ground-share during the 2017–18 season, with their Scottish Cup tie against Falkirk and SPFL promotion playoff matches being played at Harlaw Park in Inverurie.

Balmoral Stadium was officially opened in July 2018, with a friendly match between Cove Rangers and Aberdeen which had to be abandoned after Cove player Jordon Brown suffered a serious injury.

From the 2021–22 season, Scottish Women's Premier League team Aberdeen are also playing their home matches at the stadium.
