= Fraser Fyvie =

Scottish footballer

Personal information
- Full name: Fraser Anderson Fyvie
- Date of birth: 27 March 1993 (age 33)
- Place of birth: Aberdeen, Scotland
- Position: Midfielder

Senior career*
Years	Team	Apps	(Gls)
2009–2012	Aberdeen	58	(2)
2012–2015	Wigan Athletic	1	(0)
2013	→ Yeovil Town (loan)	2	(0)
2014	→ Shrewsbury Town (loan)	4	(0)
2015–2017	Hibernian	54	(2)
2017–2019	Dundee United	32	(4)
2019–2026	Cove Rangers	123	(22)

International career
2008	Scotland U15	2	(0)
2008	Scotland U16	5	(2)
2008–2009	Scotland U17	14	(3)
2010–2011	Scotland U19	4	(0)
2012–2013	Scotland U21	8	(0)
- * Club domestic league appearances and goals as of 23:30, 19 January 2023 (UTC)

Fraser Anderson Fyvie (born 27 March 1993) is a Scottish former professional footballer who played as a midfielder. He played for Aberdeen, Wigan Athletic, Hibernian, Dundee United and Cove Rangers. He represented Scotland at the under-15, under-17, under-19, and under-21 levels. Fyvie is part of a rare group of players to lift both the Scottish Cup and FA Cup.

== Early life ==
Fraser Fyvie was born in Aberdeen on 27 March 1993, and was educated at Ferryhill Primary School and Hazlehead Academy.

== Club career ==
=== Aberdeen ===
Fyvie became the youngest ever player to play for Aberdeen, making him an Aberdeen legend when he made his debut against Hamilton Academical at the age of 16 in August 2009, and won the Man of the Match award for the game. Fyvie scored his first senior goal for Aberdeen on 27 January 2010, against Hearts at Tynecastle. This goal made him the youngest ever goalscorer in a Scottish Premier League match, breaking the record previously held by Dundee United player David Goodwillie. The next day Fyvie signed a new three-year deal with Aberdeen.

In August 2010, he was ruled out for the rest of the 2010–11 season with a cruciate ligament injury sustained in a League Cup tie against Alloa Athletic. He returned to the first team in a 2–0 defeat against St Johnstone in May 2011.

Having recovered fully from his injury sustained in the previous season, Fyvie began to establish himself in the Aberdeen first team, regularly featuring in the starting eleven. He scored his first league goal of the 2011–12 season against Dunfermline Athletic in an SPL trial game of Friday night football. He also received the first red card of his career for foul and abusive language towards a linesman, in a 2–2 draw against St Mirren. Fyvie scored his second goal of the season in a Scottish Cup fifth round replay victory, away to Queen of the South.

The midfielder refused a contract extension towards the end of the 2011–2012 season, wanting to pursue his career down in England. With his contract due to expire midway through the 2012–13 season, manager Craig Brown was keen to sell Fyvie, with Premier League clubs Fulham and Wigan Athletic interested.

=== Wigan Athletic ===
Fyvie signed for Wigan Athletic in July 2012, with the Latics paying Aberdeen an undisclosed transfer fee believed to be around £500,000. Wigan manager Roberto Martínez praised him for the impact he had already made during his career at Aberdeen. The midfielder agreed a three-year contract with Wigan. On 28 August 2012, he made his debut as a substitute in the League Cup against Nottingham Forest which Wigan won 4–1. Fyvie was also brought on in the following League Cup match at West Ham on 25 September which again ended 4–1 in Wigan's favour. On 30 October, he made his full debut in Wigan's starting line-up, again in the League Cup, in a surprise defeat to Bradford following a penalty shoot-out. In November and December 2012, Fyvie was part of Wigan's Premier League match day squad seven times but did not feature. In January 2013, Fyvie started in Wigan's third round FA Cup matches against Bournemouth. He was an unused substitute as Wigan won the 2013 FA Cup Final.

On 17 October 2013, Fyvie joined fellow Championship side Yeovil Town on a loan deal, originally scheduled to end on 1 January 2014. Fyvie made his debut for Yeovil in their 0–0 draw against Brighton & Hove Albion, on 19 October 2013, but was forced off after 22 minutes having suffering a shoulder injury. He made just one further appearance for Yeovil before making an early return to Wigan on 16 December 2013.

On 23 January 2014, Fyvie joined Shrewsbury Town on a one-month loan deal. He was released from his contract with Wigan on 2 February 2015.

=== Hibernian ===
After being released by Wigan, Fyvie signed a short-term contract with Hibernian (Hibs). He made 17 appearances for Hibs during the remainder of the 2014–15 season. At the end of the season, Fyvie signed a two-year contract with Hibs. Fyvie was suspended for two matches by the Scottish FA for simulation during a match against Rangers in December 2015. The SFA found that Fyvie had feigned an injury to his face by Rangers midfielder Andy Halliday, who had aimed a kick and then barged Fyvie with his shoulder, which resulted in Halliday being sent off. Fyvie helped Hibernian win the 2015–16 Scottish Cup, in which they defeated Rangers 3–2 in the cup final.

Fyvie helped Hibs to gain promotion by winning the 2016–17 Scottish Championship. He was one of several players to be offered a new contract at the end of the season, but the offer was withdrawn after he took too long to respond.

=== Dundee United ===
Fyvie signed a one-year contract with Scottish Championship club Dundee United on 4 August 2017. He suffered a cruciate ligament injury in December 2017, which was expected to prevent him from playing for the rest of the 2017/18 season. Despite not playing again following his injury, it was announced on 17 May 2018 that he had signed a new two-year contract to stay at the club. United manager Csaba Laszlo indicated that he considered Fyvie to be "an important player" for the club and described his signing a new contract as "excellent news as we build our squad ahead of the 2018/19 season." Fyvie was released by United on 6 May 2019.

=== Cove Rangers ===
Fyvie signed a short-term contract with the newly promoted Scottish League Two side, Cove Rangers, in August 2019. He won Scottish League Two in the 2019-20 season and Scottish League One 2021-22 season with the club. On 12 February 2026, Fyvie made the decision to retire from professional football.

== International career ==
Fyvie has played for Scotland at under-15, under-16, under-17, and under-19 levels. He made his first appearance for the under-21 team in October 2012.

== Style of play ==
Roberto Martínez, after signing Fyvie for Wigan Athletic, said "Technically he's very gifted, enjoys playing in the midfield where he can cover large areas, he's very powerful off the ball and in possession is someone who can read the tempo of the game very well".

== Career statistics ==
As of match played 19 January 2023

Appearances and goals by club, season and competition
Club	Season	League			National Cup		League Cup		Other		Total	
Club	Season	Division	Apps	Goals	Apps	Goals	Apps	Goals	Apps	Goals	Apps	Goals
Aberdeen	2009–10	Scottish Premier League	25	1	1	0	0	0	0	0	26	1
Aberdeen	2010–11	Scottish Premier League	5	0	0	0	1	0	0	0	6	0
Aberdeen	2011–12	Scottish Premier League	28	1	5	1	1	0	0	0	34	2
Aberdeen	Total		58	2	6	1	2	0	0	0	66	3
Wigan Athletic	2012–13	Premier League	1	0	4	0	3	0	0	0	8	0
Wigan Athletic	2013–14	Championship	0	0	1	0	1	0	0	0	2	0
Wigan Athletic	2014–15	Championship	0	0	0	0	1	0	0	0	1	0
Wigan Athletic	Total		1	0	5	0	5	0	0	0	11	0
Yeovil Town (loan)	2013–14	Championship	2	0	0	0	0	0	0	0	2	0
Shrewsbury Town (loan)	2013–14	League One	4	0	0	0	0	0	0	0	4	0
Hibernian	2014–15	Scottish Championship	12	2	3	0	0	0	2 (Note: Appearances in the Premiership play-offs)	0	17	2
Hibernian	2015–16	Scottish Championship	21	0	2	0	4	0	5 (Note: One appearances in the Scottish Challenge Cup and four in the Premiership play-offs)	0	32	0
Hibernian	2016–17	Scottish Championship	21	0	5	0	0	0	2 (Note: Appearances in the Scottish Challenge Cup)	0	28	0
Hibernian	Total		54	2	10	0	4	0	9	0	77	2
Dundee United	2017–18	Scottish Championship	15	2	0	0	1	0	1	1	17	3
Dundee United	2018–19	Scottish Championship	17	2	1	0	0	0	1	0	19	2
Dundee United	Total		32	4	1	0	1	0	2	1	36	5
Cove Rangers	2019–20	Scottish League Two	24	5	1	0	0	0	0	0	25	5
Cove Rangers	2020–21	Scottish League One	18	0	2	0	1	0	2	0	23	0
Cove Rangers	2021–22	Scottish League One	29	8	3	1	4	2	4	2	40	13
Cove Rangers	2022–23	Scottish Championship	14	0	1	1	4	1	0	0	19	2
Cove Rangers	2023–24	Scottish League One	17	2	0	0	0	0	0	0	17	2
Cove Rangers	2024–25	Scottish League One	26	8	2	0	3	0	1	0	32	8
Cove Rangers	Total		123	22	7	2	9	3	4	2	151	29
Career totals			272	25	29	3	21	3	15	3	345	36

== Honours ==
Wigan Athletic

- FA Cup: 2012–13

Hibernian

- Scottish Championship: 2016–17
- Scottish Cup: 2015–16

Cove Rangers

- Scottish League Two: 2019–20
- Scottish League One: 2021–22

Individual

- Scottish Premier League Young Player of the Month: January 2010
