= William Gillingham (footballer) =

English footballer

Personal information
- Full name: William Finbar Gillingham
- Date of birth: 7 October 1998 (age 28)
- Place of birth: London, England
- Height: 1.91 m (6 ft 3 in)
- Position: Defender

Team information
- Current team: Port Melbourne Sharks
- Number: 6

Youth career
- 2016–2017: Onehunga Sports

College career
Years	Team	Apps	(Gls)
2017–2021	UC Santa Barbara Gauchos	66	(1)

Senior career*
Years	Team	Apps	(Gls)
2021	South Georgia Tormenta 2	12	(0)
2022	Central Valley Fuego	18	(0)
2023–2025	Cove Rangers	44	(0)
2025-	Port Melbourne Sharks	4	(0)
- * Club domestic league appearances and goals as of 10:35, 5 August 2025 (UTC)

William Finbar Gillingham (born 7 October 1998) is a professional footballer who plays as a defender for National Premier Leagues Victoria club Port Melbourne Sharks.

== Early life and education ==
Gillingham was born in London, England, but was raised in Auckland, New Zealand. He attended Sacred Heart College, Auckland, leading the Sharks to a National Championship in 2014 and 2016 and a runner-up finish in 2015. He also played with the Onehunga Sports U19 side.

In 2017, Gillingham moved to the United States to play college soccer at the University of California, Santa Barbara. In four seasons with the Gauchos, Gillingham made 66 appearances, scoring one goal with three assists, and captaining the side in their 2020–21 season.

Gillingham also competed in the USL League Two in 2021, playing twelve times for South Georgia Tormenta 2.

== Playing career ==
=== Central Valley Fuego ===
On 17 February 2022, Gillingham signed with USL League One expansion club Central Valley Fuego FC ahead of their inaugural season. He made his competitive debut for the club in its opening match of the season, appearing as an injury-time substitute during a 2–0 victory over the Greenville Triumph.

=== Scotland ===
After his time in America, Gillingham moved to Scotland to pursue professional opportunities. He trained with Livingston prior to signing a two-year deal with Cove Rangers.

=== International ===
Gillingham was on the New Zealand U23 Olympic squad's long list in 2019.
