= List of Scottish football transfers summer 2012 =

This is a list of Scottish football transfers featuring at least one 2012–13 Scottish Premier League club or one 2012–13 Scottish First Division club which were completed after the end of the 2011–12 season and before the end of the 2012 summer transfer window.

== May 2012 – August 2012 ==
Date	Name	Moving from	Moving to	Fee
8 May 2012	Mark McLaughlin	Hamilton Academical	Greenock Morton	Free
10 May 2012	Ryan McGeever	Queen's Park	Falkirk	Free
10 May 2012	Willie Dyer	Raith Rovers	Greenock Morton	Free
10 May 2012	Jon McShane	St Mirren	Hamilton Academical	Undisclosed
13 May 2012	Steven Thomson	St Mirren	Dover Athletic	Free
14 May 2012	Hugh Murray	St Mirren	Partick Thistle	Free
15 May 2012	John Baird	Raith Rovers	Dundee	Free
15 May 2012	Aaron Muirhead	Annan Athletic	Partick Thistle	Undisclosed
15 May 2012	Steven Lawless	Motherwell	Partick Thistle	Free
16 May 2012	Eddie Malone	Ayr United	Raith Rovers	Free
17 May 2012	Rhys Devlin	Airdrie United	East Stirlingshire	Free
18 May 2012	Andy Jackson	Greenock Morton	Brechin City	Free
22 May 2012	Mark Lamont	St Mirren	Dumbarton	Loan
22 May 2012	Alan Cook	Stirling Albion	Airdrie United	Free
24 May 2012	Jim Lister	Brechin City	Dumbarton	Free
24 May 2012	Phil Johnston	Airdrie United	Dumbarton	Free
24 May 2012	Jason Thomson	Heart of Midlothian	Raith Rovers	Free
24 May 2012	Jason Naismith	St Mirren	Greenock Morton	Loan
25 May 2012	Tam Scobbie	Falkirk	St Johnstone	Free
25 May 2012	Greg Tansey	Inverness Caledonian Thistle	Stevenage	Free
25 May 2012	Gary Miller	Ross County	St Johnstone	Free
25 May 2012	Stephen Stirling	Stranraer	Greenock Morton	Free
26 May 2012	Pat Clarke	Dunfermline Athletic	Raith Rovers	Free
29 May 2012	Sean Welsh	Hibernian	Partick Thistle	Free
30 May 2012	Andy Haworth	Bury	Falkirk	Free
31 May 2012	Mark Millar	Falkirk	Dundee United	Free
31 May 2012	Chris Kane	Heart of Midlothian	Dunfermline Athletic	Free
31 May 2012	John Gibson	Dundee	Elgin City	Loan
1 June 2012	Jordan Morton	Heart of Midlothian	Livingston	Free
1 June 2012	Carl Finnigan	St Johnstone	Dundee	Free
1 June 2012	Declan Gallagher	Clyde	Dundee	Free
1 June 2012	Ryan Borris	Dumbarton	Stranraer	Free
5 June 2012	Youssef Bejaoui	Cowdenbeath	Berwick Rangers	Free
6 June 2012	Danny Swanson	Dundee United	Peterborough United	Free
6 June 2012	Grégory Tadé	Inverness Caledonian Thistle	St Johnstone	Free
6 June 2012	Jordan Halsman	Motherwell	Greenock Morton	Free
6 June 2012	Kevin Cuthbert	Ayr United	Hamilton Academical	Free
7 June 2012	Ross Tokely	Inverness Caledonian Thistle	Ross County	Free
7 June 2012	Kári Árnason	Aberdeen	Rotherham United	Free
7 June 2012	Rory McArdle	Aberdeen	Bradford City	Free
7 June 2012	Ross Forsyth	Greenock Morton	Dumbarton	Free
7 June 2012	Sam Parkin	Queen of the South	St Mirren	Free
7 June 2012	Andy Graham	Greenock Morton	Dumbarton	Free
7 June 2012	Jamie Stevenson	Airdrie United	Cowdenbeath	Free
7 June 2012	Alex Baird	Newcastle United	Dundee	Free
8 June 2012	Cha Du-Ri	Celtic	Fortuna Düsseldorf	Free
8 June 2012	Johnny Flynn	Ross County	Falkirk	Free
8 June 2012	Andy Geggan	Ayr United	Dunfermline Athletic	Free
8 June 2012	Ryan Wallace	East Fife	Dunfermline Athletic	Undisclosed
8 June 2012	Josh Falkingham	Arbroath	Dunfermline Athletic	Undisclosed
8 June 2012	Ross Smith	Dundee United	Peterhead	Loan
9 June 2012	Grant Evans	Greenock Morton	Airdrie United	Free
10 June 2012	Andrew Murphy	Livingston	Bathgate Thistle	Free
11 June 2012	Iain Davidson	Raith Rovers	Dundee	Free
12 June 2012	Jody Morris	St Johnstone	Bristol City	Free
12 June 2012	Chris Smith	Ayr United	Falkirk	Free
12 June 2012	Jonathan Tuffey	Inverness Caledonian Thistle	St Johnstone	Free
14 June 2012	Willie Gibson	Falkirk	Queen of the South	Free
14 June 2012	Brian McLean	Preston North End	Dundee United	Free
15 June 2012	David Silva	Kilmarnock	Olhanense	Free
16 June 2012	Gary Glen	Heart of Midlothian	Ross County	Free
18 June 2012	Adrian Mrowiec	Heart of Midlothian	RB Leipzig	Free
19 June 2012	Derek Gaston	Albion Rovers	Greenock Morton	Free
19 June 2012	Austin McCann	Dunfermline Athletic	Ayr United	Free
19 June 2012	Steven McDougall	Dunfermline Athletic	Dumbarton	Free
19 June 2012	Kieran Burns	Partick Thistle	Irvine Meadow XI	Free
19 June 2012	Colin Stevenson	Partick Thistle	Irvine Meadow XI	Free
19 June 2012	William Kinniburgh	Partick Thistle	Irvine Meadow XI	Free
19 June 2012	John Young	Dundee United	Carnoustie Panmure	Free
20 June 2012	David Graham	Dunfermline Athletic	Greenock Morton	Free
20 June 2012	David Sinclair	Livingston	Ayr United	Free
20 June 2012	Gary Warren	Newport County	Inverness Caledonian Thistle	Free
20 June 2012	Kieran McGachie	Motherwell	Annan Athletic	Free
21 June 2012	Efraín Juárez	Celtic	Club América	Undisclosed
21 June 2012	Tim Clancy	Motherwell	Hibernian	Free
21 June 2012	Kenny Arthur	Unattached	Airdrie United	Free
23 June 2012	Garry Fleming	Irvine Meadow XI	Dumbarton	Free
25 June 2012	Grant Anderson	Hamilton Academical	Raith Rovers	Free
25 June 2012	Aaron Mooy	St Mirren	Western Sydney Wanderers	Free
25 June 2012	Jeroen Tesselaar	St Mirren	Kilmarnock	Free
26 June 2012	Jonny Hayes	Inverness Caledonian Thistle	Aberdeen	Free
27 June 2012	Paul Dixon	Dundee United	Huddersfield Town	Free
27 June 2012	Danny Buijs	Kilmarnock	Sparta Rotterdam	Free
27 June 2012	Andrew Greig	Inverness Caledonian Thistle	Brora Rangers	Free
28 June 2012	Martin Scott	Hibernian	Ross County	Loan
28 June 2012	Antonio Reguero	Gandía	Inverness Caledonian Thistle	Free
28 June 2012	David Raven	Tranmere Rovers	Inverness Caledonian Thistle	Free
28 June 2012	Jason Oswell	Crewe Alexandra	Inverness Caledonian Thistle	Free
28 June 2012	David Luongo	Stade Nyonnais	Livingston	Free
28 June 2012	Anthony Andreu	Stade Nyonnais	Livingston	Free
28 June 2012	Marc Smyth	Greenock Morton	Cliftonville	Free
29 June 2012	Blair Munn	Falkirk	Alloa Athletic	Free
30 June 2012	James McPake	Coventry City	Hibernian	Free
1 July 2012	Radosław Cierzniak	KS Cracovia	Dundee United	Free
1 July 2012	Michael Gardyne	Ross County	Dundee United	Free
1 July 2012	Jon Robertson	Cowdenbeath	St Mirren	Free
1 July 2012	Alex Whittle	Nike Academy	Dunfermline Athletic	Free
1 July 2012	Lewis Guy	Unattached	St Mirren	Free
1 July 2012	Paul Cairney	Partick Thistle	Hibernian	Free
1 July 2012	Matthew Cooper	Aberdeen	Inverness Caledonian Thistle	Free
2 July 2012	Stephen Elliott	Heart of Midlothian	Coventry City	Free
2 July 2012	Zdeněk Kroča	Kilmarnock	Tescoma Zlín	Free
3 July 2012	Farid El Alagui	Falkirk	Brentford	Free
3 July 2012	Mark Noble	Inverness Caledonian Thistle	Fraserburgh	Free
4 July 2012	Graeme Ramage	Dumbarton	Annan Athletic	Free
4 July 2012	Niall McGinn	Celtic	Aberdeen	Free
5 July 2012	Fraser Forster	Newcastle United	Celtic	£2,000,000
5 July 2012	Marcus Haber	St Johnstone	Stevenage	Free
5 July 2012	Mohammed Yaqub	Celtic	St Mirren	Free
5 July 2012	Derek Holmes	Airdrie United	Arbroath	Free
6 July 2012	Suso Santana	Heart of Midlothian	Tenerife	Free
6 July 2012	Tony Wallace	Dumbarton	Greenock Morton	Undisclosed
6 July 2012	Ross Draper	Macclesfield Town	Inverness Caledonian Thistle	Free
6 July 2012	Scott McBride	Raith Rovers	East Fife	Free
10 July 2012	Ben Williams	Colchester United	Hibernian	Free
12 July 2012	Patrick Boyle	Dunfermline Athletic	Gateshead	Loan
12 July 2012	Garry O'Connor	Hibernian	Tom Tomsk	Free
12 July 2012	Paul di Giacomo	Greenock Morton	Airdrie United	Free
12 July 2012	Stuart Anderson	Salisbury City	Raith Rovers	Free
12 July 2012	Michael Travis	Livingston	Arbroath	Free
13 July 2012	Patrick Cregg	Bury	St Johnstone	Free
14 July 2012	Gary Graham	Heart of Midlothian	Clyde	Free
14 July 2012	Nic Rajovic	Kilmarnock	Clyde	Free
15 July 2012	Luke Leahy	Rugby Town	Falkirk	Free
15 July 2012	Lyle Taylor	Bournemouth	Falkirk	Free
15 July 2012	Caolan McAleer	Partick Thistle	Arthurlie	Loan
16 July 2012	Fraser Fyvie	Aberdeen	Wigan Athletic	Undisclosed
16 July 2012	Glenn Loovens	Celtic	Real Zaragoza	Free
16 July 2012	Scott Taggart	Hibernian	Greenock Morton	Free
16 July 2012	Craig Reid	Queen of the South	Greenock Morton	Free
16 July 2012	Martin Hardie	Dunfermline Athletic	Greenock Morton	Free
18 July 2012	Greig Spence	Celtic	Raith Rovers	Free
18 July 2012	Kenny Gillet	Inverness Caledonian Thistle	AEK Larnaca	Free
18 July 2012	James Craigen	Edinburgh University	Partick Thistle	Free
19 July 2012	David Proctor	Inverness Caledonian Thistle	Edmonton	Free
19 July 2012	Gavin Griffin	Partick Thistle	Airdrie United	Free
20 July 2012	Isaiah Osbourne	Hibernian	Blackpool	Undisclosed
20 July 2012	Dene Droudge	Cowdenbeath	Berwick Rangers	Free
21 July 2012	Leigh Griffiths	Wolverhampton Wanderers	Hibernian	Loan
21 July 2012	Mihael Kovačević	Zadar	Ross County	Free
21 July 2012	Jonathan Bateson	Mansfield Town	Ross County	Free
21 July 2012	Rory Boulding	Livingston	Kilmarnock	Free
21 July 2012	Chris Tobin	Heart of Midlothian	St Johnstone	Free
21 July 2012	Ross Chisholm	Dundee	Shumen 2010	Free
23 July 2012	Michael Dunlop	Aberdeen	Forfar Athletic	Free
23 July 2012	Iain Williamson	Raith Rovers	Grindavík	Free
24 July 2012	Simon Ramsden	Bradford City	Motherwell	Free
24 July 2012	Ross McKinnon	Motherwell	Veendam	Free
25 July 2012	Mark Durnan	St Johnstone	Queen of the South	Free
25 July 2012	Matthew McGinley	Greenock Morton	Albion Rovers	Free
25 July 2012	Stephen Husband	Blackpool	Dunfermline Athletic	Free
25 July 2012	Rubén García Rey	Torremolinos	Cowdenbeath	Free
25 July 2012	Adam Monaghan	Dumbarton	Queen's Park	Free
25 July 2012	Greig Thorburn	Kilmarnock	Annan Athletic	Free
26 July 2012	Grant Adam	Rangers	St Mirren	Free
26 July 2012	Darren Brownlie	Motherwell	Ayr United	Free
26 July 2012	Dieter Van Tornhout	Kilmarnock	Royal Antwerp	Free
26 July 2012	Scott Robertson	Partick Thistle	Arbroath	Free
27 July 2012	Conor Pepper	St. Patrick's Athletic	Inverness Caledonian Thistle	Free
27 July 2012	Youl Mawéné	Aberdeen	Fleetwood Town	Free
27 July 2012	Scott Robertson	Dundee United	Blackpool	Free
27 July 2012	Michael Hart	St Johnstone	Airdrie United	Free
27 July 2012	Jake Hyde	Dundee	Barnet	Free
27 July 2012	Scott Fowlie	Dundee	Fraserburgh	Free
27 July 2012	Kevin Rutkiewicz	Dunfermline Athletic	Greenock Morton	Free
27 July 2012	Michal Hrivnak	Brescia	Dunfermline Athletic	Free
27 July 2012	Alex Keddie	Dunfermline Athletic	Arbroath	Free
27 July 2012	Marc Warren	Sheffield United	Airdrie United	Free
28 July 2012	Ian Black	Heart of Midlothian	Rangers	Free
28 July 2012	Aaron Murdoch	Heart of Midlothian	Brechin City	Free
28 July 2012	Ryan Stewart	Heart of Midlothian	Brechin City	Free
28 July 2012	Jonny Stewart	Heart of Midlothian	Brechin City	Free
28 July 2012	Jonathan Brown	Livingston	Brechin City	Free
30 July 2012	Garry Kenneth	Dundee United	Bristol Rovers	Free
30 July 2012	Phil Addison	Hibernian	Berwick Rangers	Free
30 July 2012	Marc Lancaster	Hibernian	Berwick Rangers	Free
30 July 2012	Thomas Stewart	Partick Thistle	Shamrock Rovers	Free
30 July 2012	Paul Millar	Raith Rovers	Broxburn Athletic	Free
31 July 2012	Dean Shiels	Kilmarnock	Rangers	Free
31 July 2012	Rowan Vine	Queens Park Rangers	St Johnstone	Free
1 August 2012	Daniel Majstorović	Celtic	AIK	Free
1 August 2012	Gary Naysmith	Huddersfield Town	Aberdeen	Free
1 August 2012	Morten Rasmussen	Celtic	Midtjylland	£250,000
1 August 2012	Simon King	Gillingham	Inverness Caledonian Thistle	Free
1 August 2012	Christian McKenna	Campsie Black Watch	Airdrie United	Free
2 August 2012	Dušan Perniš	Dundee United	Pogoń Szczecin	Free
2 August 2012	Mark Stewart	Bradford City	Dundee	Free
2 August 2012	Andy Walls	Raith Rovers	Lochee United	Free
2 August 2012	Derek Young	Greenock Morton	Queen of the South	Free
2 August 2012	Fayssal El Bakhtaoui	Racing Club de la Baie	Dunfermline Athletic	Free
2 August 2012	Conor Schiavone	Dunfermline Athletic	Dundonald Bluebell	Free
2 August 2012	Derek Lyle	Cowdenbeath	Queen of the South	Free
2 August 2012	Kevin Green	Airdrie United	Albion Rovers	Free
3 August 2012	Jim McAlister	Hamilton Academical	Dundee	Free
3 August 2012	Russell Cadwell	Kilmarnock	Stranraer	Free
3 August 2012	Darren O'Dea	Celtic	Toronto	Free
3 August 2012	Kyle Wilkie	Hamilton Academical	Greenock Morton	Free
4 August 2012	Gary Deegan	Coventry City	Hibernian	Undisclosed
5 August 2012	Stephen Jordan	Rochdale	Dunfermline Athletic	Free
6 August 2012	Craig Dargo	Dumbarton	Dunfermline Athletic	Free
6 August 2012	Ivan D'Angelo	Sambenedettese	Dunfermline Athletic	Free
7 August 2012	Francisco Sandaza	St Johnstone	Rangers	Free
7 August 2012	Marc Scott	Dundee United	Carnoustie Panmure	Free
7 August 2012	Ally Graham	Falkirk	Clydebank	Free
7 August 2012	Grant Howarth	Dumbarton	Beith Juniors	Free
7 August 2012	Graeme Goodall	Airdrie United	Shotts Bon Accord	Loan
8 August 2012	David Gray	Dumbarton	Montrose	Free
8 August 2012	Ricki Lamie	Airdrie United	Bathgate Thistle	Loan
9 August 2012	Mark Reynolds	Sheffield Wednesday	Aberdeen	Loan
9 August 2012	Paul Lovering	Airdrie United	Pollok	Free
10 August 2012	Fraser Kerr	Birmingham City	Motherwell	Loan
10 August 2012	Craig Beattie	Heart of Midlothian	St Johnstone	Free
10 August 2012	Davide Grassi	Brussels	Dundee	Free
10 August 2012	Mohamed Chalali	Aberdeen	ES Sétif	Free
10 August 2012	Alan Maybury	St Johnstone	Hibernian	Free
10 August 2012	Chris Smith	Dunfermline Athletic	St Mirren	Free
10 August 2012	Kieran Brannan	Dumbarton	Albion Rovers	Free
11 August 2012	Robert Thomson	Dundee United	Alloa Athletic	Loan
13 August 2012	Jonathan Lindsay	Partick Thistle	Stalybridge Celtic	Free
14 August 2012	Liam Buchanan	Dunfermline Athletic	Sligo Rovers	Free
15 August 2012	Jack Boyle	Jersey Scottish	Airdrie United	Free
16 August 2012	Marc Twaddle	Rochdale	Hamilton Academical	Free
16 August 2012	Steve Jennings	Motherwell	Coventry City	Free
16 August 2012	Mark Wilson	Celtic	Bristol City	Free
16 August 2012	Borja Pérez	Alcorcón	Kilmarnock	Free
16 August 2012	Gary Fisher	Kilmarnock	Hamilton Academical	Loan
16 August 2012	Martin Boyle	Montrose	Dundee	Undisclosed
16 August 2012	Jack Compton	Falkirk	Portsmouth	Free
17 August 2012	Nicky Devlin	Motherwell	Dumbarton	Loan
17 August 2012	Shefki Kuqi	Oldham Athletic	Hibernian	Free
17 August 2012	Sean Kelly	St Mirren	East Stirlingshire	Loan
17 August 2012	Peter Enckelman	St Johnstone	Heart of Midlothian	Free
21 August 2012	Adam McHugh	St Mirren	Hartlepool United	Free
22 August 2012	Colin Nish	Hartlepool United	Dundee	Loan
22 August 2012	Colin Hamilton	Heart of Midlothian	Arbroath	Free
22 August 2012	Zephaniah Thomas	Montegnée	Cowdenbeath	Free
23 August 2012	Peter Pawlett	Aberdeen	St Johnstone	Loan
23 August 2012	Graham Stack	Hibernian	Barnet	Free
23 August 2012	Martin Groat	Ross County	Fort William	Loan
23 August 2012	Leighton McIntosh	Dundee	Montrose	Loan
23 August 2012	Pablo Navas	Montegnée	Cowdenbeath	Free
24 August 2012	Lewis Toshney	Celtic	Dundee	Loan
24 August 2012	James Keatings	Celtic	Hamilton Academical	Loan
24 August 2012	Ki Sung-Yueng	Celtic	Swansea City	£6,000,000
25 August 2012	Craig McKeown	Dundee	Formartine United	Free
25 August 2012	Callum Morris	Unattached	Dunfermline Athletic	Free
27 August 2012	Mark Brown	Hibernian	Ross County	Free
28 August 2012	Mohamed Bangura	Celtic	AIK	Loan
29 August 2012	Stevie May	St Johnstone	Hamilton Academical	Loan
29 August 2012	Philip Roberts	Arsenal	Inverness Caledonian Thistle	Loan
30 August 2012	Ricky McIntosh	St Johnstone	Montrose	Loan
30 August 2012	Steven Craig	Ross County	Partick Thistle	Loan
30 August 2012	Thomas Piermayr	Inverness Caledonian Thistle	Wiener Neustadt	Free
30 August 2012	Chris Turner	Shamrock Rovers	Dumbarton	Free
31 August 2012	Liam Gordon	Raith Rovers	Heart of Midlothian	Undisclosed
31 August 2012	David Smith	Heart of Midlothian	Raith Rovers	Loan
31 August 2012	David Templeton	Heart of Midlothian	Rangers	Undisclosed
31 August 2012	Miku	Getafe	Celtic	Loan
31 August 2012	Efe Ambrose	Ashdod	Celtic	Undisclosed
31 August 2012	Ľuboš Kamenár	Nantes	Celtic	Loan
31 August 2012	Daryl Murphy	Celtic	Ipswich Town	Loan
31 August 2012	Andre Blackman	Celtic	Inverness Caledonian Thistle	Loan
31 August 2012	Josh Thompson	Celtic	Portsmouth	Free
31 August 2012	Ryan McGivern	Manchester City	Hibernian	Loan
31 August 2012	David Stephens	Hibernian	Barnet	Free
31 August 2012	Jordon Forster	Hibernian	East Fife	Loan
31 August 2012	Scott Smith	Hibernian	East Fife	Loan
31 August 2012	Callum Booth	Hibernian	Livingston	Loan
31 August 2012	Paul Dummett	Newcastle United	St Mirren	Loan
31 August 2012	Sean Higgins	St Johnstone	Falkirk	Free
31 August 2012	Matthew Kennedy	Kilmarnock	Everton	£200,000
31 August 2012	George Brislen-Hall	Arsenal	Inverness Caledonian Thistle	Free
31 August 2012	Ryan Stevenson	Ipswich Town	Heart of Midlothian	Free
31 August 2012	Jesús García Tena	Cuneo 1905	Livingston	Free
31 August 2012	Scott Christie	Bo'ness United	Hamilton Academical	Undisclosed
31 August 2012	Paul Willis	Dunfermline Athletic	East Fife	Loan
31 August 2012	Paul Burns	Dunfermline Athletic	Queen of the South	Free

== See also ==
- List of Scottish football transfers winter 2011–12
- List of Scottish football transfers winter 2012–13
