= 2013–14 Dunfermline Athletic F.C. season =

Dunfermline Athletic
2013–14 season
- Chairman: Bob Garmory
- Manager: Jim Jefferies
- Stadium: East End Park
- Second Division: Second
- Challenge Cup: Second round, lost to Raith Rovers
- League Cup: Second round, lost to Falkirk
- Scottish Cup: Fifth round, lost to Rangers
- Top goalscorer: League: Ryan Wallace (10); All: Ryan Wallace (13)
- Highest home attendance: 10,089 vs. Rangers, 30 December 2013
- Lowest home attendance: 1,983 vs. Forfar Athletic, 25 February 2014
- Average home league attendance: 3,330
Home colours	Away colours
- All statistics correct as of 7 September 2015.

The 2013–14 season was Dunfermline Athletic's first season back in the Scottish Second Division since 1986, having been relegated from the Scottish First Division at the end of the 2012–13 season. Dunfermline Athletic also competed in the Challenge Cup, League Cup and the Scottish Cup.

== Results & fixtures ==
Win Draw Loss Postponed

=== Preseason ===
13 July 2013 Friendly	Dunfermline Athletic	1–2	Heart of Midlothian	East End Park
14:00	Thomson 63'	Hearts FC Report	McKay 8'; Hamill 18' (pen.)	Attendance: 4,538; Referee: Beaton

20 July 2013 Friendly	Dunfermline Athletic	2–2	Falkirk	East End Park
14:00	Ferguson 12'; Buchan 86'	Falkirk FC Report	Roberts 37'; McGrandles 55'	Attendance: 1,344; Referee: Robertson

24 July 2013 Friendly	Dunfermline Athletic	1–3	Dundee United	East End Park
19:30	Falkingham 11'	DAFC Report	Gauld 22'; Goodwillie 52'; Dow 59'	Attendance: 1,830; Referee: Salmond

=== Scottish League One ===
10 August 2013 Match 1	East Fife	0–1	Dunfermline Athletic	Bayview Stadium
15:00		SPFL Report	Wallace 2' (pen.)	Attendance: 1,927; Referee: Brines

17 August 2013 Match 2	Dunfermline Athletic	2–3	Arbroath	East End Park
15:00	Morris 27'; Byrne 41'; Kane (yellow card) 52' (yellow-red card)	SPFL Report	Milne 8'; Cook 44' (pen.), 45+1'	Attendance: 3,242; Referee: Finnie

24 August 2013 Match 3	Stenhousemuir	4–5	Dunfermline Athletic	Ochilview Park
15:00	Gemmell 12'; Smith 23'; Lynch 51'; Higgins 72'	SPFL Report	Moore 57', 86' (pen.); Geggan 63', 89'; Smith 84'	Attendance: 968; Referee: O'Reilly

31 August 2013 Match 4	Dunfermline Athletic	3–1	Stranraer	East End Park
15:00	Geggan 24'; Johnston 82'; Smith 86'	SPFL Report	Grehan 22'	Attendance: 2,585; Referee: Roache

14 September 2013 Match 5	Brechin City	1–1	Dunfermline Athletic	Glebe Park
15:00	Jackson 76'	SPFL Report	Robert Thomson 39'	Attendance: 923; Referee: Muir

21 September 2013 Match 6	Dunfermline Athletic	2–1	Airdrieonians	East End Park
15:00	Husband 56'; Geggan 86'	SPFL Report	Coogans 57'	Attendance: 2,607; Referee: Northcroft

28 September 2013 Match 7	Dunfermline Athletic	5–1	Ayr United	East End Park
15:00	Wallace 21' (pen.), 65'; Whittle 31'; Geggan 39'; Falkingham 41'	SPFL Report	Moffat 3'	Attendance: 2,743; Referee: Salmond

5 October 2013 Match 8	Forfar Athletic	4–0	Dunfermline Athletic	Station Park
15:00	McManus 2'; Malcolm 15'; Malin 74'; Hilson 82'	SPFL Report		Attendance: 968; Referee: Muir

12 October 2013 Match 9	Rangers	P – P	Dunfermline Athletic	Ibrox Stadium
17:30		SPFL Report
Note: _{Postponed due to International call-ups}

19 October 2013 Match 10	Dunfermline Athletic	1–2	East Fife	East End Park
15:00	Moore 42'	SPFL Report	Brown 81'; Buchanan 84'	Attendance: 3,131; Referee: Robertson

26 October 2013 Match 11	Stranraer	1–2	Dunfermline Athletic	Stair Park
15:00	Longworth 12'	SPFL Report	Husband 49'; Falkingham 70'	Attendance: 622; Referee: Anderson

6 November 2013 Match 9^{(Rearranged)}	Rangers	3–1	Dunfermline Athletic	Ibrox Stadium
19:45	McCulloch 71' (pen.); Daly 78'; Mohsni 90+3'	SPFL Report	Moore (yellow card) 71' (yellow-red card); Falkingham 81'	Attendance: 43,082; Referee: O'Reilly

9 November 2013 Match 12	Dunfermline Athletic	3–2	Stenhousemuir	East End Park
15:00	Byrne 37'; Wallace 67'; Smith 90+2'	SPFL Report	McKinlay 24'; Smith 50'	Attendance: 2,517; Referee: McKendrick

16 November 2013 Match 13	Airdrieonians	0–3	Dunfermline Athletic	Excelsior Stadium
15:00	Duncan (red card) 60'	SPFL Report	Byrne 17'; Smith 69'; Dargo 90+3'	Attendance: 1,219; Referee: Dallas

23 November 2013 Match 14	Dunfermline Athletic	3–1	Brechin City	East End Park
15:00	Wallace 3', 87'; Moyes 22' (o.g.)	SPFL Report	Anderson (red card) 59'; McLean 80'	Attendance: 2,569; Referee: Roache

7 December 2013 Match 15	Dunfermline Athletic	1–1	Forfar Athletic	East End Park
15:00	Moore 90+4'	SPFL Report	Dods 19'	Attendance: 2,469; Referee: Northcroft

14 December 2013 Match 16	Ayr United	2–4	Dunfermline Athletic	Somerset Park
15:00	Gilmour 17'; Moffat 27'	SPFL Report	Husband 44'; Wallace 60' (pen.), 69'; Moore 90+1'	Attendance: 643; Referee: O'Reilly

21 December 2013 Match 17	Arbroath	0–3	Dunfermline Athletic	Gayfield Park
15:00		SPFL Report	Geggan 12'; Ryan Thomson 36'; Falkingham 65'	Attendance: 967; Referee: Somers

30 December 2013 Match 18	Dunfermline Athletic	0–4	Rangers	East End Park
19:45		SPFL Report	Aird 22'; Clark 52'; Law 70'; Crawford 90+2'	Attendance: 10,089; Referee: Charleston

2 January 2014 Match 19	Stenhousemuir	1–2	Dunfermline Athletic	Ochilview Park
15:00	Lynch 85'	SPFL Report	El Bakhtaoui 14'; Geggan 90+2'	Attendance: 1,556; Referee: Dallas

11 January 2014 Match 20	Dunfermline Athletic	3–2	Stranraer	East End Park
15:00	Ryan Thomson 34'; Byrne 58'; Shankland 75'; El Bakhtaoui (red card) 85'	SPFL Report	Bell 16'; McKeown 51'	Attendance: 2,952; Referee: Muir

18 January 2014 Match 21	Dunfermline Athletic	0–1	Airdrieonians	East End Park
15:00		SPFL Report	McAleer 19'	Attendance: 2,711; Referee: Graham

25 January 2014 Match 22	Brechin City	3–2	Dunfermline Athletic	Glebe Park
15:00	Carcary 57'; Jackson 61'; Petrie 89'	SPFL Report	Shankland 31'; Wallace 54'	Attendance: 854; Referee: Aitken

1 February 2014 Match 23	East Fife	1–3	Dunfermline Athletic	Bayview Stadium
15:00	Willis 78'	SPFL Report	Forbes 44'; Wallace 75'; Grainger 77'	Attendance: 1,872; Referee: Somers

15 February 2014 Match 24	Forfar Athletic	2–4	Dunfermline Athletic	Station Park
15:00	Dale 36'; Swankie 60'	SPFL Report	El Bakhtaoui 4'; Husband 69'; Dods 77' (o.g.); Shankland 89'	Attendance: 833; Referee: Anderson

22 February 2014 Match 25	Dunfermline Athletic	3–0	Ayr United	East End Park
15:00	Forbes 8'; Shankland 45+1', 78'	SPFL Report		Attendance: 2,773; Referee: Salmond

25 February 2014 Match 26	Dunfermline Athletic	3–0	Arbroath	East End Park
19:45	Husband 27'; Forbes 60'; Falkingham 72'	SPFL Report		Attendance: 1,983; Referee: Dallas

1 March 2014 Match 27	Stranraer	3–1	Dunfermline Athletic	Stair Park
15:00	Grehan 7' (pen.); McKenna 39', 73'	SPFL Report	Grainger 78' (pen.)	Attendance: 704; Referee: Aitken

8 March 2014 Match 28	Dunfermline Athletic	0–0	Stenhousemuir	Easy End Park
15:00		SPFL Report		Attendance: 2,510; Referee: Allan

15 March 2014 Match 29	Rangers	2–0	Dunfermline Athletic	Ibrox Stadium
15:00	Smith 45+4'; Gallagher 90'	SPFL Report		Attendance: 44,110; Referee: Clancy

22 March 2014 Match 30	Dunfermline Athletic	1–2	East Fife	East End Park
15:00	Shankland 22'	SPFL Report	Buchanan 56' (pen.); Austin 82'	Attendance: 2,858; Referee: Anderson

29 March 2014 Match 31	Dunfermline Athletic	2–1	Brechin City	East End Park
15:00	Shankland 48'; Millen 90' (pen.)	SPFL Report	Ryan Thomson 60'	Attendance: 2,241; Referee: Walsh

5 April 2014 Match 32	Airdrieonians	2–0	Dunfermline Athletic	Excelsior Stadium
15:00	Parker 28'; Lister 90+1'	SPFL Report		Attendance: 1,142; Referee: Allan

12 April 2014 Match 33	Dunfermline Athletic	0–0	Forfar Athletic	East End Park
15:00		SPFL Report		Attendance: 2,364; Referee: Aitken

19 April 2014 Match 34	Ayr United	1–1	Dunfermline Athletic	Somerset Park
15:00	Forrest 55'	SPFL Report	Ryan Thomson 50'	Attendance: 1,272; Referee: Finnie

26 April 2014 Match 35	Arbroath	1–2	Dunfermline Athletic	Gayfield Park
15:00	Travis 56'	SPFL Report	Ryan Thomson 14'; Geggan 79'	Attendance: 1,079; Referee: Northcroft

3 May 2014 Match 36	Dunfermline Athletic	1–1	Rangers	East End Park
15:00	Martin 71'	SPFL Report	Shiels 45'	Attendance: 7,605; Referee: Roberston

==== Scottish Championship play-offs ====
7 May 2014 Play-offs SF R1	Stranraer	2–1	Dunfermline Athletic	Stair Park
19:45	Grehan 12'; Bell 88'	SPFL Report	El Bakhtaoui 41'	Attendance: 867

10 May 2014 Play-offs SF R2	Dunfermline Athletic	3–0 (a.e.t.) (4–2 agg.)	Stranraer	East End Park
15:00	Geggan 59', 98'; El Bakhtaoui 103'	SPFL Report		Attendance: 4,525; Referee: Allan

10 May 2014 Play-offs Final R1	Cowdenbeath	1–1	Dunfermline Athletic	Central Park
19:45	O'Brien 83'	SPFL Report	Geggan 77'	Attendance: 3,379; Referee: Finnie

18 May 2014 Play-offs Final R2	Dunfermline Athletic	0–3 (1–4 agg.)	Cowdenbeath	East End Park
16:05		SPFL Report	Hemmings 1'; O'Brien 67'; Stewart 77'	Attendance: 8,288; Referee: Mclean

=== Scottish Challenge Cup ===
27 July 2013 Challenge Cup round 1	Cowdenbeath	1–3	Dunfermline Athletic	Cowdenbeath
15:00	Wedderburn 15'; Milne (red card) 85'	DAFC Report	Morris 36'; Ferguson 64'; Ryan Thomson 80'	Attendance: 1,161; Referee: Madden

20 August 2013 Challenge Cup round 2	Dunfermline Athletic	0–2	Raith Rovers	East End Park
19:45		SPFL Report	Hill 2'; Fox 64' (pen.)	Attendance: 3,765; Referee: Aitken

=== Scottish League Cup ===
3 August 2013 Scottish League Cup round 1	East Stirlingshire	0–2	Dunfermline Athletic	Ochilview Park
15:00	Turner (yellow card) 61' (yellow-red card)	SPFL Report	Wallace 10' (pen.); Dargo 88'	Attendance: 1,043; Referee: Northcroft

27 August 2013 Scottish League Cup round 2	Falkirk	2–1	Dunfermline Athletic	Falkirk Stadium
19:45	Morris 19' (o.g.); Fulton 33'	SPFL Report	Moore 28'	Attendance: 3,663; Referee: McLean

=== Scottish Cup ===
2 November 2013 Scottish Cup round 3	Elgin	3–5	Dunfermline Athletic	Borough Briggs
15:00	Duff 16'; Wyness 82'; Khutsishvili 84'	BBC Report	Wallace 19', 28'; Moore 63' (pen.), 64'; Whittle 73'	Attendance: 1,108; Referee: Cook

30 November 2013 Scottish Cup round 4	Ayr United	1–1	Dunfermline Athletic	Somerset Park
15:00	Donald 59'	BBC Report	Geggan 14'	Attendance: 1,391; Referee: Finnie

4 December 2013 Scottish Cup round 4 replay	Dunfermline Athletic	1–0	Ayr	East End Park
19:45	Ryan Thomson 60'	BBC Report		Attendance: 1,932; Referee: Finnie

7 February 2014 Scottish Cup round 5	Rangers	4–0	Dunfermline Athletic	Ibrox Stadium
19:30	Shiels 8', 24', 47'; Templeton 37'	Report		Attendance: 19,396; Referee: Madden

== Players ==
=== Captains ===
No.	P	Name	Country	No. games	Notes
	MF	Falkingham	(England)	27	Club captain
	MF	Geggan	(Scotland)	2	Vice-captain

Last updated: 26 January 2014
Source: Competitive match reports.
Competitive matches only
Matches started as captain only
Country: FIFA nationality; No.: Squad number; P: Position; Name: Player name; No. Games: Number of games started as captain.

=== Squad information ===
Last updated 2 August 2016

No.	Pos	Nat	Player	Total		League One		Scottish Cup		League Cup		Challenge Cup		Play-offs	
No.	Pos	Nat	Player	Apps	Goals	Apps	Goals	Apps	Goals	Apps	Goals	Apps	Goals	Apps	Goals
	GK	(Scotland) SCO	Ryan Goodfellow	4	0	2+2	0	0+0	0	0+0	0	0+0	0	0+0	0
	GK	(Scotland) SCO	Ryan Scully	46	0	34+0	0	4+0	0	2+0	0	2+0	0	4+0	0
	GK	(Scotland) SCO	Jamie Wilson	0	0	0+0	0	0+0	0	0+0	0	0+0	0	0+0	0
	DF	(Scotland) SCO	Ross Drummond	2	0	1+1	0	0+0	0	0+0	0	0+0	0	0+0	0
	DF	(England) ENG	Danny Grainger	15	2	11+0	2	0+0	0	0+0	0	0+0	0	4+0	0
	DF	(Scotland) SCO	Luke Johnston	6	1	5+0	1	0+0	0	1+0	0	0+0	0	0+0	0
	DF	(Scotland) SCO	Lewis Martin	18	1	13+0	1	1+0	0	0+0	0	0+0	0	3+1	0
	DF	(Scotland) SCO	Ross Millen	30	1	22+0	1	4+0	0	2+0	0	1+0	0	1+0	0
	DF	(Republic of Ireland) IRL	Callum Morris	38	2	27+1	1	4+0	0	2+0	0	2+0	1	1+1	0
	DF	(England) ENG	Jonathan Page	14	0	12+1	0	0+0	0	0+0	0	0+0	0	1+0	0
	DF	(Scotland) SCO	John Potter	1	0	1+0	0	0+0	0	0+0	0	0+0	0	0+0	0
	DF	(England) ENG	Alex Whittle	41	2	27+3	1	4+0	1	2+0	0	2+0	0	3+0	0
	DF	(Scotland) SCO	Ryan Williamson	22	0	15+3	0	1+0	0	0+0	0	0+0	0	3+0	0
	DF	(Scotland) SCO	Kerr Young	27	0	17+1	0	3+0	0	1+0	0	2+0	0	3+0	0
	MF	(Scotland) SCO	Shaun Byrne	42	4	25+6	4	4+0	0	1+1	0	2+0	0	2+1	0
	MF	(England) ENG	Josh Falkingham	42	5	28+2	5	4+0	0	2+0	0	2+0	0	4+0	0
	MF	(Scotland) SCO	Ryan Ferguson	12	1	1+7	0	0+1	0	1+0	0	2+0	1	0+0	0
	MF	(Scotland) SCO	Ross Forbes	17	3	11+2	3	0+0	0	0+0	0	0+0	0	0+4	0
	MF	(Scotland) SCO	Andy Geggan	44	12	32+1	8	4+0	1	1+1	0	1+0	0	4+0	3
	MF	(Scotland) SCO	Finn Graham	1	0	1+0	0	0+0	0	0+0	0	0+0	0	0+0	0
	MF	(Scotland) SCO	Stephen Husband	39	5	22+9	5	1+1	0	1+0	0	0+1	0	2+2	0
	MF	(Scotland) SCO	Chris Kane	5	0	2+1	0	0+0	0	1+0	0	1+0	0	0+0	0
	MF	(Scotland) SCO	Scott Mercer	1	0	0+1	0	0+0	0	0+0	0	0+0	0	0+0	0
	MF	(Scotland) SCO	Declan O'Kane	1	0	0+1	0	0+0	0	0+0	0	0+0	0	0+0	0
	MF	(Scotland) SCO	Lewis Spence	7	0	2+4	0	0+0	0	0+0	0	0+0	0	1+0	0
	MF	(Scotland) SCO	Ryan Thomson	36	6	14+10	4	3+1	1	2+0	0	2+0	1	4+0	0
	FW	(Scotland) SCO	Craig Dargo	15	2	2+6	1	0+2	0	0+2	1	0+2	0	0+1	0
	FW	(France) FRA	Faissal El Bakhtaoui	19	4	12+2	2	0+0	0	0+0	0	0+1	0	4+0	2
	FW	(Scotland) SCO	Jordan Moore	21	8	9+7	5	0+2	2	1+1	1	1+0	0	0+0	0
	FW	(Scotland) SCO	Lawrence Shankland	14	7	11+2	7	1+0	0	0+0	0	0+0	0	0+0	0
	FW	(Scotland) SCO	Allan Smith	28	4	7+15	4	2+1	0	0+1	0	0+0	0	0+2	0
	FW	(Scotland) SCO	James Thomas	0	0	0+0	0	0+0	0	0+0	0	0+0	0	0+0	0
	FW	(Scotland) SCO	Robert Thomson	9	1	7+2	1	0+0	0	0+0	0	0+0	0	0+0	0
	FW	(Scotland) SCO	Ryan Wallace	35	13	23+4	10	4+0	2	2+0	1	2+0	0	0+0	0

=== Disciplinary record ===
As of match played 18 May 2014

Position	Nation	Name	Total		Scottish League One		Scottish Cup		Scottish League Cup		Scottish Challenge Cup	
Position	Nation	Name	Yellow card	Red card	Yellow card	Red card	Yellow card	Red card	Yellow card	Red card	Yellow card	Red card
FW	(France)	Faissal El Bakhtaoui	4	1	4	1	1					
MF	(Scotland)	Chris Kane	3	1	3	1						
DF	(Scotland)	Jonathan Page	2	1	2	1						
DF	(England)	Danny Grainger	1	1	1	1						
FW	(Scotland)	Jordan Moore	1	1	1	1						
MF	(Scotland)	Andy Geggan	11		10		1					
MF	(England)	Josh Falkingham	9		8		1					
DF	(Scotland)	Kerr Young	9		6		2		1			
DF	(Republic of Ireland)	Callum Morris	8		3		3		2			
FW	(Scotland)	Ryan Wallace	7		3		2		1		1	
MF	(Scotland)	Stephen Husband	6		6							
MF	(England)	Alex Whittle	6		5						1	
MF	(Scotland)	Ross Forbes	5		5							
DF	(Scotland)	Ross Millen	5		3		1		1			
FW	(Scotland)	Lawrence Shankland	2		2							
MF	(Scotland)	Shaun Byrne	2		1		1					
MF	(Scotland)	Finn Graham	1		1							
DF	(Scotland)	Luke Johnston	1		1							
DF	(Scotland)	Lewis Martin	1		1							
MF	(Scotland)	Lewis Spence	1		1							
MF	(Scotland)	Ryan Thomson	1				1					
Total			86	5	67	5	12	0	5	0	2	0

== Club statistics ==
=== League table ===
Pos	Team	Pld	W	D	L	GF	GA	GD	Pts	Qualification or relegation
1	Rangers (C, P)	36	33	3	0	106	18	+88	102	Promotion to the Championship
2	Dunfermline Athletic	36	19	6	11	68	54	+14	63	Qualification for the Championship play-offs
3	Stranraer	36	14	9	13	57	57	0	51	Qualification for the Championship play-offs
4	Ayr United	36	14	7	15	65	66	−1	49	Qualification for the Championship play-offs
5	Stenhousemuir	36	12	12	12	57	66	−9	48	

Source: SPFL
Rules for classification: 1) points; 2) goal difference; 3) number of goals scored.
(C) Champions; (P) Promoted

==== Results by round ====
Round	1	2	3	4	5	6	7	8	9	10	11	12	13	14	15	16	17	18	19	20	21	22	23	24	25	26	27	28	29	30	31	32	33	34	35	36
Ground	A	H	A	H	A	H	H	A	H	A	A	H	A	H	H	A	A	H	A	H	H	A	A	A	H	H	A	H	A	H	H	A	H	A	A	H
Result	W	L	W	W	D	W	W	L	L	W	L	W	W	W	D	W	W	L	W	W	L	L	W	W	W	W	L	D	L	L	W	L	D	D	W	D
Position	3	4	3	2	2	2	2	2	4	3	3	2	2	2	2	2	2	2	2	2	2	2	2	2	2	2	2	2	2	2	2	2	2	2	2	2

A = Away; H = Home; W = Win; D = Draw; L = Loss

==== Results summary ====
Overall								Home						Away					
Pld	W	D	L	GF	GA	GD	Pts	W	D	L	GF	GA	GD	W	D	L	GF	GA	GD
36	19	6	11	68	54	+14	63	9	4	5	33	23	+10	10	2	6	35	31	+4

Last updated: 27 April 2016.
Source: Soccerway

== Awards ==
Award	Player
DAFC Player of the Year	(Scotland) Ryan Scully
Centenary Club Lifeline Player of the Year	(Scotland) Andy Geggan
Under 20 Player of the Year	(Scotland) Ryan Williamson

== Transfers ==
=== Players in ===
Date	Position	Nationality	Name	From	Fee	Ref.
30 July 2013	DF	(England)	James Washburn	(England) Torquay United	Free	
30 August 2013	FW	(Scotland)	Robert Thomson	Dundee United	Free	
7 January 2014	GK	(Scotland)	Jamie Wilson	Rangers	Free	
24 January 2014	DF	(England)	Jonathan Page	Greenock Morton	Free	
31 January 2014	DF	(England)	Danny Grainger	St Mirren	Free	
31 January 2014	FW	(Scotland)	Ross Forbes	Partick Thistle	Free	

=== Players out ===
Date	Position	Nationality	Name	To	Fee	Ref.
31 May 2013	DF	(Scotland)	Grant Munro	Lothian Thistle Hutchison Vale	Free	
31 May 2013	MF	(Scotland)	Andrew Ritchie	Lochee United	Free	
31 May 2013	MF	(Scotland)	Jack Bruce	Free agent	Released	
24 June 2013	MF	(Scotland)	Paul Willis	East Fife	Free	
20 August 2013	DF	(Scotland)	Patrick Boyle	Airdrieonians	Free	
29 August 2013	GK	(Slovakia)	Michal Hrivňák	(Slovakia) Spartak Trnava	Free	
1 September 2013	DF	(England)	James Washburn	(England) Stockport County	Free	
1 November 2013	FW	(Scotland)	Blair Henderson	East Fife	Free	
20 January 2014	MF	(Scotland)	Chris Kane	Cowdenbeath	Free	

=== Loan in ===
Date	Position	Nationality	Name	From	Duration	Ref.
19 July 2013	GK	(Scotland)	Ryan Scully	Partick Thistle	End of season	
30 July 2013	MF	(Scotland)	Ryan Ferguson	Dundee United	6 months	
30 July 2013	FW	(Scotland)	Jordan Moore	Dundee United	6 months	
30 July 2013	FW	(Scotland)	Luke Johnston	Dundee United	6 months	
8 January 2014	FW	(Scotland)	Lawrence Shankland	Aberdeen	6 months	

=== Loans out ===
Date	Position	Nationality	Name	To	Duration	Ref.
8 November 2013	MF	(Scotland)	Scott Mercer	Albion Rovers	1 month	
