= 2012–13 Dunfermline Athletic F.C. season =

Dunfermline Athletic
2012–13 season
- Chairman: John Yorkston
- Manager: Jim Jefferies
- Stadium: East End Park
- First Division: Ninth place (Relegated)
- Challenge Cup: First round, lost to Forfar Athletic
- League Cup: Third round, lost to Aberdeen
- Scottish Cup: Fifth Round, lost to Hamilton Academical
- Top goalscorer: League: Stephen Husband & Ryan Thomson (11); All: Andrew Barrowman (14)
- Highest home attendance: 5,835 vs. Raith Rovers, (2 January 2013)
- Lowest home attendance: 2,461 vs. Livingston, (26 January 2013)
- Average home league attendance: League: 3,849
Home colours	Away colours

The 2012–13 season was Dunfermline Athletic's first season back in the Scottish First Division, having been relegated from the Scottish Premier League at the end of the 2011–12 season. Dunfermline Athletic also competed in the Challenge Cup, League Cup and the Scottish Cup.

== Summary ==
=== Season ===
During season 2012–13 Dunfermline Athletic finished ninth in the Scottish First Division, following a points deduction, entering the play-offs losing 3–1 to Alloa Athletic on aggregate in the final and were relegated to the Scottish Second Division. They reached the first round of the Challenge Cup, the third round of the League Cup and the fifth round of the Scottish Cup.

=== Financial problems ===
The club failed to pay the players October wages on time and in November 2012, reports arose that there were unpaid tax bills due to HM Revenue and Customs. Chairman John Yorkston was adamant that any outstanding debt could be cleared, however further issues arose over the coming months as it was reported in December, January and February that players were paid late, and reduced wages, prompting to squad to lodge an official complaint with the SFL. In mid-February, the club announced it will launch their share issue, but it was cancelled at the last minute.

With the club facing a winding up order over unpaid tax of £134,000 on 26 March 2013, Dunfermline Athletic Football Club announced that the club would be put into voluntary administration, with accountancy firm PKF appointed administrators, and it was formally approved by the court the following day. Bryan Jackson, who was appointed to oversee the administration proceedings, announced on 28 March that eight players including Captain Jordan McMillan were to be made redundant, however manager Jefferies stayed, on the condition of his salary would be reduced. Assistant manager Gerry McCabe was also made redundant the following day. Players made redundant only had until 31 March to find new clubs, as this was the last day of player registrations for the 2012–13 season. The club's shareholder Gavin Masterton, who was responsible for placing the club in administration, apologised for his action. A week before the club went to administration, Pars Community, the club's largest supporters group, made a bid to buy the club, but the bid was unsuccessful and talks broke down. The club's debt is thought to be around 8.5 million pounds. On 9 April, as a result of entering administration the club were issued with a fifteen-point dedication and banned from signing any players aged over 21 until the club comes out of administration. The SFA later issued a further transfer ban running parallel to the original, meaning should the club exit administration prior to 31 December 2013 the ban would continue until that date. On 11 April 2013, the club applied for and were granted full administration at the Court of Session in Edinburgh.

== Results and fixtures ==
Win Draw Loss Postponed

=== Preseason ===
14 July 2012 Friendly	Berwick Rangers	P–P	Dunfermline Athletic	Shielfield Park
14:00		Report

18 July 2012 Friendly	Dunfermline Athletic	P–P	East Fife	East End Park
19:30		Report

19 July 2012 Friendly	Dunfermline Athletic	1–3	East Fife	East End Park
19:30	Durie 25' (Own goal)	Dunfermline Report; Scotsman Report	Samuel 19'; Durie 41'; Jamieson 81'	Attendance: 800 est Referee: Finnie

21 July 2012 Friendly	Dunfermline Athletic	0–2	Heart of Midlothian	East End Park
15:00		Dunfermline Report	Webster 33'; Sutton 77' (pen.)	Attendance: 1,805; Referee: Somers

24 July 2012 Friendly	Berwick Rangers	1–2	Dunfermline Athletic	Shielfield Park
19:30	Ferguson 3'	Report	Kirk 20' (Penalty); Barrowman	Attendance: 250; Referee: Salmond

25 July 2012 Friendly	Lochgelly Albert	1–2	Dunfermline Athletic XI	Gardiners Park
19:00	McDiarmid 75'	Report	Willis 34'; Trialist 60'

1 August 2012 Friendly	Dunfermline Athletic	0–2	Bristol City	East End Park
19:30		Report	Pitman 11'; Adomah	Attendance: 531; Referee: Norris

=== Scottish First Division ===
11 August 2012	Cowdenbeath	0–4	Dunfermline Athletic	Central Park
15:00		SFL Report	Barrowman 44'; Thomson 49', 79'; Falkingham 83'	Attendance: 2,507; Referee: McKendrick

18 August 2012	Dunfermline Athletic	0–1	Partick Thistle	East End Park
15:00		SFL Report	Lawless 24'	Attendance: 3,540; Referee: Brines

25 August 2012	Airdrie United	1–2	Dunfermline Athletic	Excelsior Stadium
15:00	Boyle 26'	SFL Report	Dowie 80'; Husband 84'	Attendance: 1,229; Referee: O'Reilly

1 September 2012	Dunfermline Athletic	3–1	Raith Rovers	East End Park
15:00	Wallace 25'; Falkingham 33'; Barrowman 56'	SFL Report	Hill 51'	Attendance: 5,634; Referee: Murray

15 September 2012	Dumbarton	0–2	Dunfermline Athletic	Dumbarton Football Stadium
15:00		SFL Report	Kirk 41'; Jordan 52'	Attendance: 1,021; Referee: Madden

22 September 2012	Dunfermline Athletic	4–0	Livingston	East End Park
15:00	Barrowman 26', 65'; McMillan 30'; Thomson 61'	SFL Report		Attendance: 2,958; Referee: Somers

29 September 2012	Hamilton Academical	0–3	Dunfermline Athletic	New Douglas Park
15:00		SFL Report	Wallace 46', 70'; Thomson 89'	Attendance: 1,330; Referee: Charleston

6 October 2012	Falkirk	2–2	Dunfermline Athletic	Falkirk Stadium
15:00	Taylor 30', 55'	SFL Report	Barrowman 79'; Thomson 82'	Attendance: 4,691; Referee: Colvin

20 October 2012	Dunfermline Athletic	2–2	Greenock Morton	East End Park
15:00	Husband 82' (pen.); Wallace 87'	SFL Report	Campbell 40', 76'	Attendance: 3,511; Referee: Charleston

27 October 2012	Dunfermline Athletic	3–0	Cowdenbeath	East End Park
15:00	Cardle 28'; Armstrong 77' (o.g.); Dargo 84'	SFL Report		Attendance: 3,353; Referee: Clancy

10 November 2012	Partick Thistle	5–1	Dunfermline Athletic	Firhill Stadium
15:00	Laawless 5', 75'; Balatoni 34'; O'Donnell 39'; Forbes 56'	BBC Report	Muirhead 24' (o.g.)	Attendance: 5,268; Referee: Murray

17 November 2012	Raith Rovers	1–3	Dunfermline Athletic	Stark's Park
15:00	Clarke 24'; Walker (red card) 45'; Hill (yellow card) 45' (yellow-red card) 46'	SFL Report	Husband 37', 88'; Cardle 47'	Attendance: 4,294; Referee: Allan

24 November 2012	Dunfermline Athletic	4–0	Dumbarton	East End Park
15:00	Falkingham 31'; Graham 37' (o.g.); Wallace 69' (pen.); Cardle 90'	SFL Report	Grindlay (red card) 67'	Attendance: 3,565; Referee: Roache

8 December 2012	Livingston	2–1	Dunfermline Athletic	Almondvale Stadium
15:00	García Tena 65'; Mullen 90'; Barr (yellow card) 27' (red card) 90+3'	SFL Report	Morris (red card) 19'; Barrowman 90+4' (pen.)	Attendance: 1,495; Referee: Beaton

15 December 2012	Dunfermline Athletic	1–1	Hamilton Academical	East End Park
15:00	Barrowman 33'	SFL Report	May 17'	Attendance: 2,864; Referee: Thomson

26 December 2012	Dunfermline Athletic	0–1	Falkirk	East End Park
15:00	McMillan (red card) 41'	SFL Report	Duffie (yellow card) 32' (yellow-red card) 85'; Alston 90'	Attendance: 5,746; Referee: Finnie

29 December 2012	Greenock Morton	4–2	Dunfermline Athletic	Cappielow
15:00	Bachirou 44'; Tidser 56', 89'; Weatherson 61'	SFL Report	Morris 9'; Wallace 77'	Attendance: 3,076; Referee: McKendrick

2 January 2013	Dunfermline Athletic	1–0	Raith Rovers	East End Park
15:00	Geggan 71'	SFL Report		Attendance: 5,835; Referee: Charleston

5 January 2013	Dumbarton	0–1	Dunfermline Athletic	Dumbarton Football Stadium
15:00		SFL Report	Barrowman 1'	Attendance: 1,043; Referee: Brines

12 January 2013	Dunfermline Athletic	1–3	Airdrie United	East End Park
15:00	Wallace 13'	SFL Report	Donnelly 4', 59'; Di Giacomo 83' (pen.)	Attendance: 2,823; Referee: Norris

19 January 2013	Cowdenbeath	P–P	Dunfermline Athletic	Central Park
15:00		BBC Report
Note: Postponed due to frozen pitch

26 January 2013	Dunfermline Athletic	0–1	Livingston	East End Park
15:00		SFL Report	Andreu 21'	Attendance: 2,461; Referee: Tumilty

9 February 2013	Hamilton Academical	1–2	Dunfermline Athletic	New Douglas Park
15:00	Gillespie 66'	SFL Report	Kirk 37'; Kane 64'	Attendance: 1,248; Referee: Madden

12 February 2013	Cowdenbeath	4–2	Dunfermline Athletic	Central Park
19:45	Milne 33'; Linton 75', 88'; Hemmings 81'	BBC Report	Dowie 70'; Kirk 71'	Attendance: 1,330; Referee: Somers

16 February 2013	Falkirk	1–0	Dunfermline Athletic	Falkirk Stadium
15:00	Weatherston 86'	SFL Report		Attendance: 3,680; Referee: McLean

23 February 2013	Dunfermline Athletic	1–4	Greenock Morton	East End Park
15:00	Morris 83'	SFL Report	MacDonald 31' (pen.), 50'; Tidser 45', 64'	Attendance: 2,720; Referee: Charleston

2 March 2013	Dunfermline Athletic	0–4	Partick Thistle	East End Park
15:00		SFL Report	Craig 4', 22', 33'; Forbes 15'	Attendance: 2,822; Referee: Madden

16 March 2013	Raith Rovers	1–1	Dunfermline Athletic	Stark's Park
15:00	Spence 39'	SFL Report	Geggan 58'	Attendance: 3,733; Referee: Beaton

23 March 2013	Dunfermline Athletic	3–4	Dumbarton	East End Park
15:00	Wallace 41'; Barrowman 49', 56'	SFL Report	McDougall 51', 84'; Turner 59'; Agnew 65'	Attendance: 3,409; Referee: Muir

27 March 2013	Dunfermline Athletic	0–2	Falkirk	East End Park
19:45		SFL Report	Taylor 10'; Alston 88'	Attendance: 2,879; Referee: Salmond

30 March 2013	Livingston	2–2	Dunfermline Athletic	Almondvale Stadium
15:00	Andreu 54'; McNulty 68'	SFL Report	Thomson 22'; Husband 90' (pen.)	Attendance: 1,465; Referee: Robertson

6 April 2013	Dunfermline Athletic	2–3	Hamilton Academical	East End Park
15:00	Thomson 36'; Husband 66' (pen.)	SFL Report	McShane 2'; Devlin 57'; Canning 77'	Attendance: 4,697; Referee: Roache

13 April 2013	Greenock Morton	0–1	Dunfermline Athletic	Cappielow
15:00		SFL Report	Thomson 10'	Attendance: 1,634; Referee: Norris

20 April 2013	Dunfermline Athletic	1–0	Cowdenbeath	East End Park
15:00	Husband 67' (pen.)	SFL Report		Attendance: 4,879; Referee: Mclean

27 April 2013	Partick Thistle	3–3	Dunfermline Athletic	Firhill Stadium
15:00	McMillan 27'; Erskine 84'; Lawless 90+5'	SFL Report	Wallace 65'; Geggan 72'; Thomson 80'	Attendance: 5,663; Referee: Collum

4 May 2013	Dunfermline Athletic	1–2	Airdrie United	East End Park
15:00	Thomson 58'	SFL Report	Coogans 45'; McLaren 68'	Attendance: 4,624; Referee: Thomson

==== First Division play-offs ====
8 May 2013 Semi-final, first leg	Forfar Athletic	3–1	Dunfermline Athletic	Station Park
19:45	Robertson 34'; Templeman 38', 45+1'	SFL Report	Husband 84'	Attendance: 1,562; Referee: Allan

11 May 2013 Semi-final, second leg	Dunfermline Athletic	6–1 (a.e.t.) (7–4 agg.)	Forfar Athletic	East End Park
15:00	Dunlop 36' (o.g.); Thomson 62'; Millen 81' (pen.); Smith 102'; Husband 110', 118'	SFL Report	Campbell 6'; McCulloch (red card) 15'; Dunlop (red card) 53'; Campbell (yellow card) 84' (red card)	Attendance: 4,252; Referee: O'Reilly

15 May 2013 Final, first leg	Alloa Athletic	3–0	Dunfermline Athletic	Recreation Park
19:45	Tiffoney 27'; Elliot 45+2'; Moon 90+2'	SFL Report		Attendance: 2,765; Referee: McLean

19 May 2013 Final, second leg	Dunfermline Athletic	1–0 (1–3 agg.)	Alloa Athletic	East End Park
16:05	Smith 73'; Husband (red card) 75'	SFL Report		Attendance: 5,110; Referee: Thomson

=== Scottish Challenge Cup ===
28 July 2012 First round	Forfar Athletic	3–2	Dunfermline Athletic	Station Park
15:00	Kader 13'; Denholm 53'; Swankie 66'	SFL Report	Wallace 16'; Barrowman 35'	Attendance: 840; Referee: Clancy

=== Scottish League Cup ===
28 August 2012 Second round	Dunfermline Athletic	3–0	Montrose	East End Park
19:45	Barrowman 4', 64'; Wallace 41'	SFL Report		Attendance: 903; Referee: Salmond

26 September 2012 Third round	Dunfermline Athletic	0–1	Aberdeen	East End Park
19:45		BBC Report; SFL Report	Vernon 93'	Attendance: 3,057; Referee: Beaton

=== Scottish Cup ===
1 December 2012 Fourth round	Partick Thistle	0–1	Dunfermline Athletic	Firhill Stadium
15:00	Muirhead (red card) 27'	BBC Report	Barrowman 35'; Barrowman (red card) 90'	Attendance: 3,197; Referee: McLean

2 February 2013 Fifth round	Dunfermline Athletic	0–2	Hamilton Academical	East End Park
15:00		BBC Report	May 51'; Routledge 61'	Attendance: 2,588; Referee: Beaton

== Players ==
=== Captains ===
No.	P	Name	Country	No. games	Notes
	DF	McMillan	(Scotland)	32	Club captain
	MF	Falkingham	(England)	7	Club captain

Last updated: 11 May 2013
Source: Competitive match reports.
Competitive matches only
Matches started as captain only
Country: FIFA nationality; No.: Squad number; P: Position; Name: Player name; No. Games: Number of games started as captain.

=== Squad information ===
Last updated 2 August 2016

No.	Pos	Nat	Player	Total		First Division		Challenge Cup		League Cup		Scottish Cup	
No.	Pos	Nat	Player	Apps	Goals	Apps	Goals	Apps	Goals	Apps	Goals	Apps	Goals
	GK	(Scotland) SCO	Paul Gallacher	33	0	28+0	0	1+0	0	2+0	0	2+0	0
	GK	(Slovakia) SVK	Michal Hrivňák	10	0	10+0	0	0+0	0	0+0	0	0+0	0
	GK	(Scotland) SCO	Ryan Goodfellow	0	0	0+0	0	0+0	0	0+0	0	0+0	0
	DF	(Scotland) SCO	Patrick Boyle	0	0	0+0	0	0+0	0	0+0	0	0+0	0
	DF	(Scotland) SCO	Andy Dowie	35	2	30+0	2	1+0	0	2+0	0	2+0	0
	DF	(Scotland) SCO	Ross Drummond	2	0	0+2	0	0+0	0	0+0	0	0+0	0
	DF	(England) ENG	Stephen Jordan	23	1	20+0	1	0+0	0	2+0	0	1+0	0
	DF	(Scotland) SCO	Lewis Martin	1	0	0+1	0	0+0	0	0+0	0	0+0	0
	DF	(Scotland) SCO	Jordan McMillan	32	1	27+0	1	1+0	0	2+0	0	2+0	0
	DF	(Scotland) SCO	Ross Millen	14	1	10+3	1	0+0	0	0+0	0	1+0	0
	DF	(Republic of Ireland) IRL	Callum Morris	30	2	26+0	2	0+0	0	2+0	0	2+0	0
	DF	(Scotland) SCO	Grant Munro	3	0	1+2	0	0+0	0	0+0	0	0+0	0
	DF	(Scotland) SCO	John Potter	15	0	13+1	0	1+0	0	0+0	0	0+0	0
	DF	(Scotland) SCO	Kerr Young	9	0	9+0	0	0+0	0	0+0	0	0+0	0
	MF	(Scotland) SCO	Paul Burns	1	0	0+1	0	0+0	0	0+0	0	0+0	0
	MF	(Scotland) SCO	Shaun Byrne	19	0	11+5	0	0+0	0	0+1	0	1+1	0
	MF	(England) ENG	Joe Cardle	29	3	20+5	3	1+0	0	1+0	0	1+1	0
	MF	(Italy) ITA	Ivan D'Angelo	2	0	0+1	0	0+0	0	0+1	0	0+0	0
	MF	(England) ENG	Josh Falkingham	37	3	31+1	3	1+0	0	2+0	0	2+0	0
	MF	(Scotland) SCO	Andy Geggan	34	3	29+1	3	1+0	0	2+0	0	1+0	0
	MF	(Scotland) SCO	Stephen Husband	37	11	28+4	11	1+0	0	2+0	0	2+0	0
	MF	(Scotland) SCO	Chris Kane	17	1	11+5	1	0+1	0	0+0	0	0+0	0
	MF	(Scotland) SCO	Allan Smith	12	1	7+5	1	0+0	0	0+0	0	0+0	0
	MF	(Scotland) SCO	Ryan Thomson	39	11	25+10	11	1+0	0	0+1	0	1+1	0
	MF	(England) ENG	Alex Whittle	29	0	13+13	0	0+1	0	1+0	0	0+1	0
	MF	(Scotland) SCO	Paul Willis	2	0	2+0	0	0+0	0	0+0	0	0+0	0
	FW	(Scotland) SCO	Andrew Barrowman	26	14	20+2	10	1+0	1	2+0	2	1+0	1
	FW	(Scotland) SCO	Craig Dargo	30	1	9+18	1	0+0	0	0+1	0	1+1	0
	FW	(France) FRA	Faissal El Bakhtaoui	1	0	0+1	0	0+0	0	0+0	0	0+0	0
	FW	(Scotland) SCO	Blair Henderson	1	0	0+1	0	0+0	0	0+0	0	0+0	0
	FW	(Northern Ireland) NIR	Andy Kirk	29	4	10+16	4	0+1	0	0+1	0	1+0	0
	FW	(Scotland) SCO	Ryan Wallace	37	12	28+4	10	1+0	1	2+0	1	1+1	0

=== Disciplinary record ===
Includes all competitive matches.

Last updated 11 May 2013

Nation	Position	Name	First Division		Challenge Cup		League Cup		Scottish Cup		Total	
Nation	Position	Name	Yellow card	Red card	Yellow card	Red card	Yellow card	Red card	Yellow card	Red card	Yellow card	Red card
(Scotland)	GK	Paul Gallacher	0	0	0	0	0	0	0	0	0	0
(Scotland)	GK	Ryan Goodfellow	0	0	0	0	0	0	0	0	0	0
(Slovakia)	GK	Michal Hrivňák	0	0	0	0	0	0	0	0	0	0
(Scotland)	DF	Patrick Boyle	0	0	0	0	0	0	0	0	0	0
(Scotland)	DF	Andy Dowie	4	0	1	0	0	0	0	0	5	0
(Scotland)	DF	Ross Drummond	0	0	0	0	0	0	0	0	0	0
(France)	DF	Faissal El Bakhtaoui	0	0	0	0	0	0	0	0	0	0
(England)	DF	Stephen Jordan	4	0	0	0	0	0	0	0	4	0
(Scotland)	DF	Lewis Martin	0	0	0	0	0	0	0	0	0	0
(Scotland)	DF	Jordan McMillan	8	1	0	0	0	0	1	0	9	1
(Scotland)	DF	Ross Millen	0	0	0	0	0	0	0	0	0	0
(Republic of Ireland)	DF	Callum Morris	4	1	0	0	0	0	1	0	5	1
(Scotland)	DF	Grant Munro	0	0	0	0	0	0	0	0	0	0
(Scotland)	DF	John Potter	3	0	0	0	0	0	0	0	3	0
(Scotland)	DF	Kerr Young	2	0	0	0	0	0	0	0	2	0
(Scotland)	MF	Paul Burns	0	0	0	0	0	0	0	0	0	0
(Scotland)	MF	Shaun Byrne	2	0	0	0	0	0	0	0	2	0
(England)	MF	Joe Cardle	2	0	0	0	0	0	0	0	2	0
(Italy)	MF	Ivan D'Angelo	0	0	0	0	0	0	0	0	0	0
(England)	MF	Josh Falkingham	8	0	0	0	0	0	0	0	8	0
(Scotland)	MF	Andy Geggan	6	0	0	0	0	0	1	0	7	0
(Scotland)	MF	Stephen Husband	6	0	1	0	0	0	0	0	7	0
(Scotland)	MF	Chris Kane	5	0	0	0	0	0	0	0	5	0
(Scotland)	MF	Allan Smith	1	0	0	0	0	0	0	0	1	0
(Scotland)	MF	Ryan Thomson	6	0	0	0	0	0	1	0	7	0
(England)	MF	Alex Whittle	1	0	0	0	0	0	0	0	1	0
(Scotland)	MF	Paul Willis	0	0	0	0	0	0	0	0	0	0
(Scotland)	FW	Andrew Barrowman	2	0	0	0	0	0	2	1	4	1
(Scotland)	FW	Craig Dargo	1	0	0	0	0	0	0	0	1	0
(Scotland)	FW	Blair Henderson	0	0	0	0	0	0	0	0	0	0
(Northern Ireland)	FW	Andy Kirk	0	0	0	0	0	0	0	0	0	0
(Scotland)	FW	Ryan Wallace	5	0	0	0	0	0	0	0	5	0

=== Awards ===
Last updated 14 October 2012

Nation	Name	Award	Month
(Scotland)	Jim Jefferies	First Division Manager of the Month	September

== Team statistics ==
=== League table ===
Pos	Team	Pld	W	D	L	GF	GA	GD	Pts	Promotion or relegation
6	Raith Rovers	36	11	13	12	45	48	−3	46	
7	Dumbarton	36	13	4	19	58	83	−25	43	
8	Cowdenbeath	36	8	12	16	51	65	−14	36	
9	Dunfermline Athletic (R)	36	14	7	15	62	59	+3	34 (Note: Dunfermline Athletic were deducted 15 points for entering administration.)	Qualification for the First Division Play-offs
10	Airdrie United (R)	36	5	7	24	41	89	−48	22	Relegation to League One

Source: SPFL Archive
Rules for classification: 1) points; 2) goal difference; 3) number of goals scored.
(R) Relegated

=== Division summary ===
Round	1	2	3	4	5	6	7	8	9	10	11	12	13	14	15	16	17	18	19	20	21	22	23	24	25	26	27	28	29	30	31	32	33	34	35	36
Ground	A	H	A	H	A	H	A	A	H	H	A	A	H	A	H	H	A	H	A	H	H	A	A	A	H	H	A	A	A	H	A	H	A	H	A	H
Result	W	L	W	W	W	W	W	D	D	W	L	W	W	L	D	L	L	W	W	L	L	W	L	L	L	L	D	D	L	L	D	L	W	W	D	L
Position	1	4	4	2	2	2	2	1	2	1	2	2	2	2	2	3	3	3	1	2	3	3	3	3	3	4	4	4	4	4	5	5	9 (Note: Dunfermline were deducted 15 points in the days prior to this fixture altering league standings. This was as a result of them entering administration.)	8	8	9

Updated to match(es) played on 15 May 2013. Source:
A = Away; H = Home; W = Win; D = Draw; L = Loss

== Transfers ==
John Potter was initially released but later re-signed as a player and under 20 coach.

=== Players in ===
Player	From	Fee
(England) Alex Whittle	(England) Nike Academy	Free
(Scotland) Chris Kane	(Scotland) Heart of Midlothian	Free
(Scotland) Ryan Wallace	(Scotland) East Fife	Undisclosed
(Scotland) Andy Geggan	(Scotland) Ayr United	Free
(England) Josh Falkingham	(Scotland) Arbroath	Undisclosed
(Scotland) Stephen Husband	(England) Blackpool	Free
(Slovakia) Michal Hrivňák	(Italy) Brescia Calcio	Free
(France) Faissal El Bakhtaoui	(France) Racing Club de la Baie	Free
(England) Stephen Jordan	(England) Rochdale	Free
(Scotland) Craig Dargo	(Scotland) Dumbarton	Free
(Italy) Ivan D'Angelo	(Italy) Sambenedettese	Free
(Republic of Ireland) Callum Morris	Unattached	Free

=== Players out ===
Player	To	Fee
(Scotland) Chris Smith	(Scotland) St Mirren	Free
(Scotland) Alex Keddie	(Scotland) Arbroath	Free
(Scotland) Austin McCann	(Scotland) Ayr United	Free
(Scotland) David Graham	(Scotland) Greenock Morton	Free
(Scotland) Steven McDougall	(Scotland) Dumbarton	Free
(Scotland) Martin Hardie	(Scotland) Greenock Morton	Free
(Scotland) Pat Clarke	(Scotland) Raith Rovers	Free
(Spain) Bernardo Domínguez	(Spain) Mirandés	Free
(Scotland) Kevin Rutkiewicz	(Scotland) Greenock Morton	Free
(Scotland) Steven Bell	Free Agent	Free
(Scotland) Nick Phinn	(Scotland) Stranraer	Free
(Scotland) James Birnie	Free Agent	Free
(Scotland) Steven Leslie	Free Agent	Free
(Scotland) Conor Schiavone	(Scotland) Dundonald Bluebell	Free
(Scotland) John MacDonald	(Scotland) Newtongrange Star	Free
(Scotland) Gary Mason		Retired
(Scotland) Patrick Boyle	(England) Gateshead	Loan
(Scotland) Liam Buchanan	(Republic of Ireland) Sligo Rovers	Free
(Scotland) Mark Kerr	(Scotland) Dundee	Free
(Scotland) Paul Willis	(Scotland) East Fife	Loan
(Scotland) Paul Burns	(Scotland) Queen of the South	Free
(Scotland) Allan Smith	(Scotland) Brechin City	Loan
(Scotland) Paul Gallacher	(Scotland) Ross County	Made Redundant
(Scotland) Jordan McMillan	(Scotland) Partick Thistle	Made Redundant
(England) Stephen Jordan	Free Agent	Made Redundant
(Scotland) Andy Dowie	(Scotland) Partick Thistle	Made Redundant
(Scotland) Joe Cardle	(Scotland) Raith Rovers	Made Redundant
(Scotland) Andy Kirk	Free Agent	Made Redundant
(Scotland) Andrew Barrowman	(Scotland) Dundee	Made Redundant
(Scotland) Steven Mayne	Free Agent	Made Redundant
