= 2014–15 Dunfermline Athletic F.C. season =

Dunfermline Athletic
2014–15 season
- Chairman: Bob Garmory
- Manager: Jim Jefferies (until 16 December); John Potter (from 16 December)
- Stadium: East End Park
- League One: Seventh
- Challenge Cup: Second Round, lost to Falkirk
- League Cup: Second Round, lost to St Mirren
- Scottish Cup: Fourth Round, lost to Stranraer
- Top goalscorer: League: Faissal El Bakhtaoui & Gozie Ugwu (7); All: Faissal El Bakhtaoui (9)
- Highest home attendance: League: 3,342 vs. Greenock Morton, (25 October 2014); Cup: 4,230 vs. Raith Rovers, (5 August 2014)
- Lowest home attendance: League: 1,574 vs. Brechin City, (24 February 2015); Cup: 1,436 vs. Stranraer, (9 December 2014)
- Average home league attendance: 2,523
Home colours	Away colours
- All statistics correct as of 7 September 2015.

The 2014–15 season was Dunfermline Athletic's second season in the Scottish League One, having been relegated from the Scottish First Division at the end of the 2012–13 season. Dunfermline Athletic also competed in the Challenge Cup, League Cup and the Scottish Cup.

== Results & fixtures ==
Win Draw Loss Postponed

=== Pre-season ===
12 July 2014 Friendly	Dunfermline Athletic	1–0	Livingston	Ainslie Park, Edinburgh
13:00	Forbes 16'	Match Report		Attendance: 400℮

15 July 2014 Friendly	Dunfermline Athletic	0–0	Hibernian	East End Park
19:30		Match Report		Attendance: 2,712; Referee: Finnie

19 July 2014 Friendly	Berwick Rangers	1–2	Dunfermline Athletic	Shielfield Park
14:00	Maxwell 57'	Match Report	Byrne 14'; Moffat 47'	Attendance: 0 Referee: Taylor

=== Scottish League One ===
9 August 2014 Match 1	Dunfermline Athletic	0–0	Brechin City	East End Park
15:00		SPFL Report		Attendance: 2,875; Referee: Anderson

16 August 2014 Match 2	Forfar	2–0	Dunfermline Athletic	Station Park
15:00	Hilson 58'; Dods 73'	SPFL Report		Attendance: 1,003; Referee: Roache

23 August 2014 Match 3	Dunfermline Athletic	3–0	Airdrieonians	East End Park
15:00	Ugwu 24', 80'; Moffat 41'	SPFL Report		Attendance: 2,653; Referee: Finnie

30 August 2014 Match 4	Stranraer	1–2	Dunfermline Athletic	Stair Park
15:00	Gibson 35'; Malcolm (red card) 50'	SPFL Report	Ugwu 5'; Moffat 63'; Millen (red card) 34'	Attendance: 573; Referee: Robertson

13 September 2014 Match 5	Dunfermline Athletic	2–0	Stenhousemuir	East End Park
15:00	Thomson 54'; Moffat 84' (pen.)	SPFL Report	McMenamin (red card) 68'	Attendance: 2,671; Referee: Charleston

20 September 2014 Match 6	Greenock Morton	2–1	Dunfermline Athletic	Cappielow
15:00	McManus 29'; Pepper 76'	SPFL Report	Millen 72' (pen.)	Attendance: 1,934; Referee: Walsh

27 September 2014 Match 7	Dunfermline Athletic	3–0	Peterhead	East End Park
15:00	Falkingham 59'; Ugwu 71'; Thomson 88'	SPFL Report	Redman (red card) 15'; Noble (red card) 45+1'; Brown (red card) 45+3'	Attendance: 2,409; Referee: Aitken

4 October 2014 Match 8	Stirling Albion	0–2	Dunfermline Athletic	Forthbank Stadium
15:00	Wedderburn (yellow card) 83' (red card)	SPFL Report	Byrne 80'; El Bakhtaoui 90+2'	Attendance: 1,623; Referee: Dallas

10 October 2014 Match 9	Ayr	0–1	Dunfermline Athletic	Somerset Park
19:45		SPFL Report	El Bakhtaoui 29'	Attendance: 1,457; Referee: Anderson

18 October 2014 Match 10	Dunfermline Athletic	0–0	Forfar	East End Park
15:00		SPFL Report		Attendance: 2,923; Referee: Finnie

25 October 2014 Match 11	Dunfermline Athletic	1–2	Greenock Morton	East End Park
15:00	El Bakhtaoui 52'	SPFL Report	O'Ware 79'; McManus 90+3'	Attendance: 3,342; Referee: McKendrick

8 November 2014 Match 12	Peterhead	1–1	Dunfermline Athletic	Balmoor Stadium
15:00	Stevenson 88'	SPFL Report	El Bakhtaoui 19'	Attendance: 740; Referee: Murray

15 November 2014 Match 13	Stenhousemuir	1–0	Dunfermline Athletic	Ochilview Park
15:00	Faulds 71'	SPFL Report		Attendance: 1,177; Referee: Walsh

22 November 2014 Match 14	Dunfermline Athletic	4–0	Stirling Albion	East End Park
15:00	Ugwu 71', 18', 60'; Stirling 71'	SPFL Report	Robertson (red card) 80'	Attendance: 2,451; Referee: Steven

6 December 2014 Match 15	Dunfermline Athletic	4–2	Ayr	East End Park
15:00	Stirling 19'; Smith 22', 57'; Byrne 30'	SPFL Report	McLaughlin 27'; Forrest 56'	Attendance: 2,509; Referee: Anderson

13 December 2014 Match 16	Airdrieonians	3–1	Dunfermline Athletic	Excelsior Stadium
15:00	Prunty 3'; Blockley 55'; Fitzpatrick 64'	SPFL Report	Buchanan 84'	Attendance: 878; Referee: Newlands

20 December 2014 Match 17	Dunfermline Athletic	0–1	Stranraer	East End Park
15:00		SPFL Report	McKeown 59'	Attendance: 2,572; Referee: Murray

27 December 2014 Match 18	Brechin City	P – P	Dunfermline Athletic	Glebe Park
15:00		BBC Report
Note: _{Match postponed due to frozen pitch}

3 January 2015 Match 19	Dunfermline Athletic	1–1	Peterhead	East End Park
15:00	Forbes 20'; Geggan (red card) 75'	SPFL Report	McAllister 63' (pen.)	Attendance: 2,729; Referee: Charleston

10 January 2015 Match 20	Stirling Albion	2–2	Dunfermline Athletic	Forthbank Stadium
15:00	C. Smith 60'; Wedderburn 79'; Coult (red card) 37'	SPFL Report	Smith 42'; Martin 90+2'	Attendance: 1,152; Referee: Allan

17 January 2015 Match 21	Dunfermline Athletic	2–2	Airdrieonians	East End Park
15:00	Millen 34' (pen.); Moffat 75'	SPFL Report	Lister 10'; Gilfillan 56'	Attendance: 2,589; Referee: Robertson

24 January 2015 Match 22	Greenock Morton	2–0	Dunfermline Athletic	Cappielow
17:30	Caldwell 67'; MacDonald 81'	SPFL Report		Attendance: 1,447; Referee: Muir

31 January 2015 Match 23	Ayr	0–2	Dunfermline Athletic	Somerset Park
15:00		SPFL Report	Geggan 66'; Hopkirk 90+1'	Attendance: 1,149; Referee: Northcroft

7 February 2015 Match 24	Dunfermline Athletic	P – P	Brechin City	East End Park
15:00		SPFL Report
Note: _{Match postponed due to Brechin City's Scottish Cup fixture}

14 February 2015 Match 25	Dunfermline Athletic	3–2	Stenhousemuir	East End Park
15:00	Barrowman 45+2', 90+4'; McAusland 74'	SPFL Report	McMullan 18'; McMenamin 44'	Attendance: 2,393; Referee: Newlands

21 February 2015 Match 26	Forfar	1–0	Dunfermline Athletic	Station Park
15:00	Husband 58'	SPFL Report		Attendance: 1,134; Referee: Northcroft

24 February 2015 Match 24 ^{(Rearranged)}	Dunfermline Athletic	0–1	Brechin City	East End Park
19:45		SPFL Report	Trouten 73'	Attendance: 1,574; Referee: Dallas

28 February 2015 Match 27	Stranraer	5–1	Dunfermline Athletic	Stair Park
15:00	Gallagher 10'; Aitken 31'; Gibson 44'; Longworth 49'; McShane 83'	SPFL Report	Geggan 26'; Buchanan (red card) 29'	Attendance: 498; Referee: Graham

3 March 2015 Match 18 ^{(Rearranged)}	Brechin City	1–1	Dunfermline Athletic	Glebe Park
19:45	McLean 58'	Report	Falkingham 1'	Attendance: 615; Referee: Aitken

7 March 2015 Match 28	Dunfermline Athletic	2–1	Ayr	East End Park
15:00	Devlin 63' (o.g.); Geggan 76'	SPFL Report	Crawford 86'	Attendance: 2,467; Referee: Walsh

14 March 2015 Match 29	Dunfermline Athletic	1–1	Stirling Albion	East End Park
15:00	Geggan 75'	SPFL Report	G. Smith 71'	Attendance: 2,318; Referee: Salmond

21 March 2015 Match 30	Stenhousemuir	0–1	Dunfermline Athletic	Ochilview Park
15:00		SPFL Report	El Bakhtaoui 46'	Attendance: 983; Referee: Charleston

28 March 2015 Match 31	Dunfermline Athletic	0–4	Greenock Morton	East End Park
15:00		SPFL Report	McCluskey 45'; Kilday 50'; McManus 76'; Russell 90'	Attendance: 2,732; Referee: Clancy

4 April 2015 Match 32	Peterhead	1–1	Dunfermline Athletic	Balmoor Stadium
15:00	Rodgers 18'	SPFL Report	Moffat 78'	Attendance: 668; Referee: Walsh

11 April 2015 Match 33	Dunfermline Athletic	1–0	Stranraer	East End Park
15:00	El Bakhtaoui 83'	SPFL Report		Attendance: 1,951; Referee: Northcroft

18 April 2015 Match 34	Brechin City	3–0	Dunfermline Athletic	Glebe Park
15:00	Trouten 25', 29'; Jackson 64'	SPFL Report		Attendance: 808; Referee: McKendrick

25 April 2015 Match 35	Dunfermline Athletic	1–3	Forfar	East End Park
15:00	El Bakhtaoui 77'	SPFL Report	Fortheringham 8'; Templeman 19'; Hilson 36' (pen.)	Attendance: 2,262; Referee: Duncan

2 May 2015 Match 36	Airdrieonians	3–2	Dunfermline Athletic	Excelsior Stadium
15:00	Greenock Morton 45'; McHugh 47', 90'	SPFL Report	Geggan 33'; Falkingham 59'	Attendance: 1,055; Referee: Salmond

=== Scottish Challenge Cup ===
5 August 2014 Challenge Cup round 1	Dunfermline Athletic	1–0	Raith Rovers	East End Park
19:45	Millen 82'	SPFL Report		Attendance: 4,230; Referee: Muir

19 August 2014 Challenge Cup round 2	Dunfermline Athletic	1–2	Falkirk	East End Park
19:45	Geggan 68'	SPFL Report	Taiwo 55', 60'; Biabi (red card) 75'	Attendance: 2,810; Referee: Salmond

=== Scottish League Cup ===
2 August 2014 Scottish League Cup round 1	Dunfermline Athletic	5–1	Annan	East End Park
15:00	Whittle 24'; Buchanan 36'; Moffat 46'; Wallace 71'; Martin 89'	SPFL Report	Hopkirk 57'	Attendance: 1,544; Referee: McKendrick

26 August 2014 Scottish League Cup round 2	St Mirren	2–1	Dunfermline Athletic	St Mirren Park
19:45	Caldwell 50', 80'	SPFL Report	Spence 9'	Attendance: 1,931; Referee: McLean

=== Scottish Cup ===
2 November 2014 Scottish Cup round 3	East Stirlingshire	1–4	Dunfermline Athletic	Ochilview Park
15:00	Greenhill 79'	DAFC Report	El Bakhtaoui 37', 62'; Byrne 76'; Millen 84' (pen.)	Attendance: 991; Referee: Muir

29 November 2014 Scottish Cup round 4	Stranraer	2–2	Dunfermline Athletic	Stair Park
15:00	Gibson 80'; Geggan 90+5' (o.g.)	DAFC Report	Geggan 14'; Buchanan 61'	Attendance: 489; Referee: Roache

9 December 2014 Scottish Cup round 4 replay	Dunfermline Athletic	1–3	Stranraer	East End Park
19:45	Millen 62' (pen.)	DAFC Report	Winter 32'; Stirling 57'; Longworth 90'	Attendance: 1,436; Referee: Roache

=== Fife Cup ===
7 February 2015 Semi-final/Benefit match	Cowdenbeath	1–3	Dunfermline Athletic	Central Park
14:00	Brett 67'	Match Report	Spence 37'; McMillan 78'; Smith 81' (pen.)	Attendance: 711; Referee: Stuart

== Player statistics ==

Most frequent starting line-up uses the team's most used formation: 4–4–2. The players used are those who have played the most games in goals, defence, midfield and up-front, not necessarily who have played most games in each respective position.

=== Captains ===
No.	P	Name	Country	No. games	Notes
	MF	Andy Geggan	(Scotland)	23	Club Captain until 16 December 2014, 2nd Vice Captain until end of the season
	MF	Josh Falkingham	(England)	17	1st Vice Captain until 16 December 2014, Club Captain until end of the season
	DF	Gregor Buchanan	(Scotland)	3	1st Vice Captain as of 16 December 2014

Last updated: 25 September 2015
Source: Competitive match reports.
Competitive matches only
Matches started as captain only
Country: FIFA nationality; No.: Squad number; P: Position; Name: Player name; No. Games: Number of games started as captain.

=== Squad ===
Last updated 23 July 2016

No.	Pos	Nat	Player	Total		Scottish League One		Scottish Cup		League Cup		Challenge Cup	
No.	Pos	Nat	Player	Apps	Goals	Apps	Goals	Apps	Goals	Apps	Goals	Apps	Goals
	GK	(Scotland) SCO	Cammy Gill	0	0	0	0	0	0	0	0	0	0
	GK	(Scotland) SCO	Ryan Goodfellow	2	0	0+2	0	0	0	0	0	0	0
	GK	(Scotland) SCO	Ryan Scully	41	0	34	0	3	0	2	0	2	0
	GK	(Scotland) SCO	Jamie Wilson	2	0	2	0	0	0	0	0	0	0
	DF	(Scotland) SCO	Gregor Buchanan	36	3	30	1	3	1	2	1	1	0
	DF	(Scotland) SCO	Lewis Martin	35	2	29+1	1	1	0	2	1	2	0
	DF	(Scotland) SCO	Ross Millen	33	5	27	2	3	2	1	0	2	1
	DF	(England) ENG	Jonathan Page	3	0	1+1	0	0	0	0	0	1	0
	DF	(Scotland) SCO	Jim Paterson	6	0	5+1	0	0	0	0	0	0	0
	DF	(Scotland) SCO	Stuart Urquhart	14	0	10+2	0	2	0	0	0	0	0
	DF	(Scotland) SCO	Ryan Williamson	17	0	14+2	0	0	0	0	0	0+1	0
	MF	(Scotland) SCO	Shaun Byrne	26	3	20+2	2	3	1	0	0	1	0
	MF	(England) ENG	Josh Falkingham	38	3	26+6	3	2	0	2	0	2	0
	MF	(Scotland) SCO	Andy Geggan	40	7	29+4	5	3	1	2	0	2	1
	MF	(Republic of Ireland) IRL	Paul George	4	0	3+1	0	0	0	0	0	0	0
	MF	(Scotland) SCO	Finn Graham	4	0	4	0	0	0	0	0	0	0
	MF	(Scotland) SCO	Kyle McAusland	14	1	13+1	1	0	0	0	0	0	0
	MF	(Scotland) SCO	Scott Mercer	0	0	0	0	0	0	0	0	0	0
	MF	(Scotland) SCO	Declan O'Kane	4	0	1+3	0	0	0	0	0	0	0
	MF	(Scotland) SCO	Lewis Spence	31	1	20+6	0	1	0	2	1	2	0
	MF	(Scotland) SCO	Andy Stirling	18	2	7+8	2	2	0	0+1	0	0	0
	MF	(Scotland) SCO	Ryan Thomson	23	1	10+7	1	3	0	1+1	0	0+1	0
	MF	(England) ENG	Alex Whittle	28	1	20+4	0	3	0	1	1	0	0
	FW	(Scotland) SCO	Andy Barrowman	13	2	9+4	2	0	0	0	0	0	0
	FW	(France) FRA	Faissal El Bakhtaoui	30	9	13+11	7	3	2	1	0	2	0
	FW	(Scotland) SCO	David Hopkirk	12	1	10+2	1	0	0	0	0	0	0
	FW	(Scotland) SCO	Michael Moffat	41	6	29+5	5	3	0	2	1	2	0
	FW	(Scotland) SCO	Allan Smith	16	3	8+5	3	2	0	0+1	0	0	0
	FW	(Scotland) SCO	James Thomas	2	1	0+1	1	1	0	0	0	0	0
	FW	(Scotland) SCO	Ryan Wallace	5	1	1+3	0	0	0	0+1	1	0	0
Players who appeared for Dunfermline Athletic but left during the season:
	DF	(Scotland) SCO	Ross Drummond	7	0	4+1	0	0	0	0	0	2	0
	MF	(Scotland) SCO	Ross Forbes	17	1	8+5	1	1	0	1+1	0	1	0
	FW	(Scotland) SCO	Lewis Allan	8	0	5+3	0	0	0	0	0	0	0
	FW	(Cameroon) CMR	Sorel Chemin	3	0	0+2	0	1	0	0	0	0	0
	FW	(England) ENG	Gozie Ugwu	19	7	10+5	7	1	0	1	0	0+2	0

=== Clean sheets ===
Pos	Nat	Name	Total	Scottish League One	Scottish Cup	Scottish League Cup	Scottish Challenge Cup
GK	(Scotland)	Ryan Scully	12	11	0	0	1
GK	(Scotland)	Ryan Goodfellow	1	1	0	0	0
GK	(Scotland)	Jamie Wilson	0	0	0	0	0
		Totals	13	12	0	0	1

Last updated: 25 April 2015
Source: Match reports in Competitive matches

=== Goalscorers ===
As of match played 2 May 2015

Place	Position	Nation	Name	Total	Scottish League One	Scottish Cup	Scottish League Cup	Scottish Challenge Cup
1	FW	(France)	Faissal El Bakhtaoui	9	7	2		
2	FW	(England)	Gozie Ugwu	7	7			
2	MF	(Scotland)	Andy Geggan	7	5	1		1
4	FW	(Scotland)	Michael Moffat	6	5		1	
5	DF	(Scotland)	Ross Millen	5	2	2		1
6	MF	(England)	Josh Falkingham	3	3			
6	FW	(Scotland)	Allan Smith	3	3			
6	MF	(Scotland)	Shaun Byrne	3	2	1		
6	DF	(Scotland)	Gregor Buchanan	3	1	1	1	
10	FW	(Scotland)	Andy Barrowman	2	2			
10	MF	(Scotland)	Andy Stirling	2	2			
10	DF	(Scotland)	Lewis Martin	2	1		1	
13	FW	(Scotland)	Ross Forbes	1	1			
13	FW	(Scotland)	David Hopkirk	1	1			
13	FW	(Scotland)	Kyle McAusland	1	1			
13	FW	(Scotland)	James Thomas	1	1			
13	MF	(Scotland)	Ryan Thomson	1	1			
13	MF	(Scotland)	Lewis Spence	1			1	
13	FW	(Scotland)	Ryan Wallace	1			1	
13	FW	(England)	Alex Whittle	1			1	
13			Own goal	1	1			
Total				60	45	7	6	2

=== Disciplinary record ===
As of match played 25 April 2015

Position	Nation	Name	Total		Scottish League One		Scottish Cup		Scottish League Cup		Scottish Challenge Cup	
Position	Nation	Name	Booked	Sent off (straight red)	Booked	Sent off (straight red)	Booked	Sent off (straight red)	Booked	Sent off (straight red)	Booked	Sent off (straight red)
DF	(Scotland)	Ross Millen	3	2	3	2						
DF	(Scotland)	Gregor Buchanan	9	1	7	1	2					
MF	(Scotland)	Andy Geggan	5	1	3	1	1				1	
MF	(England)	Josh Falkingham	8		7				1			
MF	(Scotland)	Lewis Spence	4		4							
MF	(England)	Alex Whittle	3		3							
DF	(Scotland)	Stuart Urquhart	3		3							
MF	(Scotland)	Ryan Thomson	3		2				1			
MF	(Scotland)	Shaun Byrne	3		1		1				1	
MF	(Scotland)	Finn Graham	2		2							
DF	(Scotland)	Lewis Martin	2		2							
DF	(Scotland)	Jim Paterson	2		2							
FW	(Scotland)	Andy Barrowman	1		1							
DF	(Scotland)	Ross Drummond	1		1							
FW	(France)	Faissal El Bakhtaoui	1		1							
MF	(Republic of Ireland)	Paul George	1		1							
FW	(Scotland)	Michael Moffat	1		1							
MF	(Scotland)	Declan O'Kane	1		1							
DF	(England)	Jonathan Page	1		1							
Total			54	4	46	4	4	0	2	0	2	0

== Club statistics ==
=== League table ===
Pos	Team	Pld	W	D	L	GF	GA	GD	Pts	Promotion or relegation
5	Airdrieonians	36	16	10	10	53	39	+14	58	
6	Peterhead	36	14	9	13	51	54	−3	51	
7	Dunfermline Athletic	36	13	9	14	46	48	−2	48	
8	Ayr United	36	9	7	20	45	60	−15	34	
9	Stenhousemuir (O)	36	8	5	23	42	63	−21	29	Qualification for the League One play-offs

Source: SPFL
Rules for classification: 1) points; 2) goal difference; 3) number of goals scored.
(O) Play-off winners

=== Results by round ===
Round	1	2	3	4	5	6	7	8	9	10	11	12	13	14	15	16	17	18	19	20	21	22	23	24	25	26	27	28	29	30	31	32	33	34	35	36
Ground	H	A	H	A	H	A	H	A	A	H	H	A	A	H	H	A	H	A	H	A	H	A	A	H	H	A	A	H	H	A	H	A	H	A	H	A
Result	D	L	W	W	W	L	W	W	W	D	L	D	L	W	W	L	L	D	D	D	D	L	W	L	W	L	L	W	D	W	L	D	W	L	L	L
Position	8	8	5	2	1	4	2	2	1	2	2	2	4	3	2	4	4	5	5	5	5	5	5	5	4	5	6	5	7	5	6	6	6	7	7	7

Updated to match(es) played on 2 May 2015. Source: BBC Sport
A = Away; H = Home; W = Win; D = Draw; L = Loss

== Awards ==
Award	Player
Player's Player of the Year	(Scotland) Ryan Scully
DAFC Player of the Year	(Scotland) Ryan Scully
Centenary Club Lifeline Player of the Year	(Scotland) Ryan Scully
Under 20 Player of the Year	(Scotland) Lewis Spence

== Transfers ==
=== Players in ===
Date	Position	Nationality	Name	From	Fee	Ref.
27 May 2014	FW	(Scotland)	Michael Moffat	Ayr United	Free	
28 May 2014	DF	(Scotland)	Gregor Buchanan	Airdrieonians	Free	
29 May 2014	MF	(Scotland)	Andy Stirling	Stranraer	Free	
3 August 2014	FW	(England)	Gozie Ugwu	(England) Reading	Free	
23 August 2014	DF	(Scotland)	Stuart Urquhart	(England) Coventry City	Free	
2 October 2014	FW	(Cameroon)	Sorel Chemin	(France) Paris Saint-Germain	Free	
6 January 2015	DF	(Scotland)	Jim Paterson	Forfar Athletic	Free	
13 January 2015	FW	(Scotland)	Andy Barrowman	Greenock Morton	Player swap (Ross Forbes)	
14 January 2015	MF	(Scotland)	Kyle McAusland	Rangers	Free	
30 January 2015	FW	(Scotland)	David Hopkirk	Annan Athletic	Free	
10 February 2015	MF	(Republic of Ireland)	Paul George	Celtic	Free	

=== Players out ===
Date	Position	Nationality	Name	To	Fee	Ref.
22 May 2014	MF	(Scotland)	Stephen Husband	Forfar Athletic	Free	
17 June 2014	DF	(Republic of Ireland)	Callum Morris	Dundee United	Free	
5 August 2014	DF	(Scotland)	Kerr Young	(England) Berwick Rangers	Free	
19 August 2014	FW	(Scotland)	Craig Dargo	(England) Berwick Rangers	Free	
29 December 2014	FW	(Cameroon)	Sorel Chemin	(France) Le Havre reserves	Free	
29 December 2014	FW	(England)	Gozie Ugwu	(England) Yeovil	Free	
9 January 2015	DF	(Scotland)	Ross Drummond	(England) Berwick Rangers	Free	
13 January 2015	FW	(Scotland)	Ross Forbes	Greenock Morton	Player swap (Andy Barrowman)	

=== Loan in ===
Date	Position	Nationality	Name	From	Duration	Ref.
6 July 2014	GK	(Scotland)	Ryan Scully	Partick Thistle	Season long	
19 February 2015	FW	(Scotland)	Lewis Allan	Hibernian	1.5 months	

=== Loans out ===
Date	Position	Nationality	Name	To	Duration	Ref.
2 August 2014	DF	(Scotland)	Declan O'Kane	Montrose	3 months	
11 September 2014	DF	(Scotland)	Jonathan Page	East Fife	3 months	
16 January 2015	DF	(England)	Jonathan Page	East Fife	6 months	
26 February 2015	MF	(Scotland)	Andy Stirling	Stirling Albion	3 months	
23 March 2015	GK	(Scotland)	Jamie Wilson	(England) Berwick Rangers	Initial 2-month loan, returned 3 April 2015	
