= Chris Kane (footballer, born 1993) =

Scottish footballer (born 1993)

Personal information
- Full name: Christopher Kane
- Date of birth: 31 May 1993 (age 33)
- Place of birth: Edinburgh, Scotland
- Height: 1.81 m (5 ft 11 in)
- Positions: Defender; midfielder

Youth career
- 2005–2012: Heart of Midlothian

Senior career*
Years	Team	Apps	(Gls)
2011–2012	Heart of Midlothian	0	(0)
2012–2014	Dunfermline Athletic	23	(1)
2014–2016	Cowdenbeath	57	(2)
2016–2019	East Fife	77	(5)
2019–2020	Edinburgh City	25	(1)
2020–2021	Stenhousemuir	7	(0)
2021–2022	Edinburgh City	13	(0)
2022–2023	Bonnyrigg Rose Athletic	8	(0)
- * Club domestic league appearances and goals as of 6 May 2023

Christopher Kane (born 31 May 1993) is a Scottish professional footballer who plays as a defender.

== Career ==
Kane signed for Hearts in 2005 from Edinburgh rivals Hibernian, where he progressed through the youth ranks and went on to captain the Hearts under-19 squad. On 17 December 2011, he was promoted to the first team being named a substitute against Dunfermline, after the late withdrawal of Andy Driver.

On 31 May 2012, it was announced that Kane had signed a two-year contract with Scottish First Division side Dunfermline Athletic. He made his first team debut as a substitute on 28 July 2012 in a Challenge Cup match against Forfar Athletic. He made his league debut on 1 September, coming on as an 80th-minute substitute replacing Stephen Husband in a 3–1 win over Raith Rovers.

On 18 January 2014, Kane joined Cowdenbeath after leaving Dunfermline Athletic. After two and a half years at Cowdenbeath, Kane signed for Fife rivals East Fife in May 2016.

After a season at Edinburgh City, Kane joined Stenhousemuir in August 2020. He rejoined Edinburgh City during the 2021 close season. On 14 January 2022, Edinburgh City confirmed that Kane had left the club following the expiration of his contract.

On 4 November 2022, Kane signed for Scottish League Two side Bonnyrigg Rose Athletic.

== Career statistics ==
As of match played 28 October 2017

Appearances and goals by club, season and competition
Club	Season	League			Scottish Cup		League Cup		Other		Total	
Club	Season	Division	Apps	Goals	Apps	Goals	Apps	Goals	Apps	Goals	Apps	Goals
Dunfermline Athletic	2012–13	Scottish First Division	14	1	0	0	0	0	4 (Note: One appearance in the Scottish Challenge Cup and three in the First Division play-offs)	0	18	1
Dunfermline Athletic	2013–14	Scottish League One	3	0	0	0	1	0	1 (Note: Appearances in the Scottish Challenge Cup)	0	5	0
Dunfermline Athletic	Total		17	1	0	0	1	0	5	0	23	1
Cowdenbeath	2013–14	Scottish Championship	10	0	0	0	0	0	2 (Note: Appearances in the Championship play-offs)	0	12	0
Cowdenbeath	2014–15	Scottish Championship	16	0	0	0	1	0	1	0	18	0
Cowdenbeath	2015–16	Scottish League One	21	2	2	0	1	0	3 (Note: Appearances in the League One play-offs)	0	27	2
Cowdenbeath	Total		47	2	2	0	2	0	6	0	57	2
East Fife	2016–17	Scottish League One	34	3	4	1	3	0	2	0	43	4
East Fife	2017–18	Scottish League One	4	0	0	0	1	0	0	0	5	0
East Fife	Total		38	3	4	1	4	0	2	0	48	4
Career total			102	6	6	1	7	0	13	0	128	7
