= Ryan Thomson (footballer, born 1991) =

Scottish footballer

Personal information
- Date of birth: 13 April 1991 (age 35)
- Place of birth: Glasgow, Scotland
- Position: Midfielder

Team information
- Current team: Darvel

Youth career
- 2005–2008: Dunfermline Athletic

Senior career*
Years	Team	Apps	(Gls)
2008–2015	Dunfermline Athletic	108	(17)
2010	→ Albion Rovers (loan)	15	(1)
2015–2018	Stranraer	85	(11)
2018–2019	Dumbarton	20	(0)
2019–2020	Stranraer	20	(1)
2020–	Darvel		
- * Club domestic league appearances and goals as of 14:59, 11 July 2020 (UTC)

Ryan Thomson (born 13 April 1991) is a Scottish footballer who plays as a midfielder for Scottish club Darvel in the sixth tier of Scottish football. Thomson has previously played for Dunfermline Athletic, Dumbarton and Stranraer, as well as Albion Rovers on loan.

== Career ==
In February of the 2009–10 season, Thomson was loaned to Scottish Third Division side Albion Rovers, making 15 appearances and scoring 1 goal. He made his first-team debut for the Dunfermline as a substitute on 5 November 2010 in a 2–1 defeat to Morton and began to make regular appearances from the bench towards the end of the 2010–11 season.

With the Pars promoted to the SPL for the 2011–12 season, Thomson continued to make appearances from the bench, and scored his first goal for the club away to Kilmarnock in a 3–2 defeat on 10 September 2011. After seven years with The Pars, Thomson was released by the side at the end of the 2014–15 season. Shortly after leaving Dunfermline, Thomson signed a contract with Stranraer, spending three years with the club before leaving in May 2018. After leaving the Blues he joined up with former manager Stevie Aitken at fellow Scottish League One side Dumbarton. He left the Sons in May 2019 after making just 14 starts in all competitions and rejoined former club Stranraer. In June 2020, Thomson made the switch to West of Scotland Football League side Darvel.

== Career statistics ==
As of 18:28, 20 April 2019 (UTC)

Appearances and goals by club, season and competition
Club	Season	League			Scottish Cup		League Cup		Other		Total	
Club	Season	Division	Apps	Goals	Apps	Goals	Apps	Goals	Apps	Goals	Apps	Goals
Albion Rovers (loan)	2009–10	Scottish Third Division	15	1	0	0	0	0	0	0	15	1
Dunfermline Athletic	2010–11	Scottish First Division	9	0	2	0	0	0	0	0	11	0
Dunfermline Athletic	2011–12	Scottish Premier League	25	2	2	0	2	0	0	0	29	2
Dunfermline Athletic	2012–13	Scottish First Division	33	10	2	0	1	0	5 (Note: One appearance in the Scottish Challenge Cup; four appearances and a goal in the First Division play-offs)	1	41	11
Dunfermline Athletic	2013–14	Scottish League One	24	4	4	1	2	0	5 (Note: One appearance and a goal in the Scottish Challenge Cup; four appearances in the Championship play-offs)	1	35	6
Dunfermline Athletic	2014–15	Scottish League One	18	1	3	0	2	0	1 (Note: Appearances in the Scottish Challenge Cup)	0	24	1
Dunfermline Athletic	Total		109	17	13	1	7	0	11	2	140	20
Stranraer	2015–16	Scottish League One	29	4	2	1	2	0	5 (Note: One appearance in the Scottish Challenge Cup and four in the Championship play-offs)	0	38	5
Stranraer	2016–17	Scottish League One	29	4	2	0	4	0	3	0	38	4
Stranraer	2017–18	Scottish League One	27	3	2	0	4	0	3	0	36	3
Stranraer	First Spell Total		85	11	6	1	10	0	11	0	112	12
Dumbarton	2018–19	Scottish League One	20	0	0	0	3	0	2	0	25	0
Stranraer	2019–20	Scottish League One	0	0	0	0	0	0	0	0	0	0
Career total			229	29	19	2	20	0	24	2	292	33
