= Ross Millen =

Scottish footballer (born 1994)

Personal information
- Date of birth: 28 September 1994 (age 32)
- Place of birth: Glasgow, Scotland
- Height: 1.88 m (6 ft 2 in)
- Position: Defender

Youth career
- Clyde
- St Mirren
- Dunfermline Athletic

Senior career*
Years	Team	Apps	(Gls)
2013–2015	Dunfermline Athletic	60	(3)
2015–2016	Livingston	9	(0)
2016	Clyde	15	(0)
2016–2018	Queen's Park	52	(8)
2018–2021	Kilmarnock	25	(1)
2021–2022	Scunthorpe United	20	(0)
2022–2024	Raith Rovers	65	(1)
2024–2025	Morecambe	17	(0)
2025–2026	Inverness Caledonian Thistle	11	(1)
- * Club domestic league appearances and goals as of 13:38, 31 May 2026 (UTC)

Ross Millen (born 28 September 1994) is a Scottish professional footballer who most recently played as a right-back for Scottish Championship club Inverness Caledonian Thistle.

Millen has previously played for Dunfermline Athletic, Livingston, Clyde, Queen's Park, Kilmarnock, Scunthorpe United, Raith Rovers, and Morecambe.

He is the son of former Ayr United, Kilmarnock, Alloa Athletic, Hamilton Academical and St Mirren defender Andy Millen.

== Career ==
Millen made his Dunfermline debut against Hamilton on 2 February 2013, having played for the Dunfermline U20s team alongside team-mate Shaun Byrne. After the Pars went into administration, Millen featured regularly in the first-team, and scored his first goal for the club, a penalty, against Forfar in the First Division play-offs on 11 May 2013. Millen scored the winner in a 1–0 victory over rivals Raith in a Scottish League Cup match on Tuesday 5 August 2014. His other three goals all came from the penalty spot against Brechin, Forfar & Greenock.

After leaving Dunfermline at the end of the 2014–15 season, Millen signed for Scottish Championship side Livingston in July 2015. Millen stayed with the side for only six months, leaving in January 2016 in order to seek regular first-team football. Shortly after leaving Livingston, Millen signed a six-month contract with Clyde who he previously played for as a youth player. At the end of his contract, Millen was released by the Cumbernauld side. At the beginning of July 2016, Millen was signed by Scottish League Two side Queen's Park, with whom his father Andy Millen finished his playing career with.

Millen signed a six-month deal with Kilmarnock in July 2018. He stayed at the club for just under 3 years before letting his contract expire in June 2021.

On 6 July 2021, Millen joined League Two side Scunthorpe United, signing a two-year deal following his release from Kilmarnock.

Millen signed for Raith Rovers on a two-year deal on 14 June 2022. On 7 March 2024 it was confirmed that Millen was training on his own and would no longer be selected to play for the club due to an 'internal matter'. Manager Ian Murray confirmed that he would remain contracted to the club until his contract expires and was not to be loaned to another team.

MIllen was one of 15 free agents that signed for League Two club Morecambe on 12 July 2024, after the club's embargo on registering new players was lifted.

On 19 June 2025, Millen left Morecambe and signed for Scottish League One side, Inverness Caledonian Thistle.

On 25 May 2026 it was announced that Millen was one of 9 players who would be leaving Inverness upon the expiration of his contract.

== Career statistics ==
As of 6 May 2021

Club statistics
Club	Season	League			National cup (Note: Includes Scottish Cup, FA Cup)		League cup (Note: Includes Scottish League Cup, EFL Cup)		Other		Total	
Club	Season	Division	Apps	Goals	Apps	Goals	Apps	Goals	Apps	Goals	Apps	Goals
Dunfermline Athletic	2012–13	Scottish First Division	11	0	1	0	—		4 (Note: Appearance(s) in Scottish First Division play-offs)	1	16	1
Dunfermline Athletic	2013–14	Scottish League One	22	1	4	0	2	0	2 (Note: One appearance in Scottish Challenge Cup, one appearance in Scottish Championship play-offs)	0	30	1
Dunfermline Athletic	2014–15	Scottish League One	27	2	3	2	1	0	2 (Note: Appearance(s) in Scottish Challenge Cup)	1	33	5
Dunfermline Athletic	Total		60	3	8	2	3	0	8	2	79	7
Livingston	2015–16	Scottish Championship	9	0	0	0	3	0	2	0	14	0
Clyde	2015–16	Scottish League Two	15	0	0	0	0	0	3 (Note: Appearance(s) in Scottish League One play-offs)	0	18	0
Queen's Park	2016–17	Scottish League One	27	7	3	0	4	0	3	0	37	7
Queen's Park	2017–18	Scottish League One	25	1	1	0	4	1	3 (Note: One appearance in Scottish Challenge Cup, two appearances in Scottish League One play-offs)	0	33	2
Queen's Park	Total		52	8	4	0	8	1	6	0	70	9
Kilmarnock	2018–19	Scottish Premiership	4	1	0	0	2	0	—		6	1
Kilmarnock	2019–20	Scottish Premiership	4	0	2	0	0	0	0	0	6	0
Kilmarnock	2020–21	Scottish Premiership	19	0	3	1	0	0	2 (Note: Appearance(s) in Scottish Premiership play-offs)	0	24	1
Kilmarnock	Total		27	1	5	1	2	0	2	0	36	2
Scunthorpe United	2021–22	League Two	20	0	0	0	0	0	1 (Note: Appearance(s) in EFL Trophy)	0	21	0
Raith Rovers	2022–23	Scottish Championship	33	0	2	0	4	0	4	0	43	0
Raith Rovers	2023–24	Scottish Championship	19	1	2	0	1	0	3	0	25	1
Raith Rovers	Total		52	1	4	0	5	0	7	0	68	1
Morecambe	2024–25	League Two	17	0	1	0	1	0	3	0	22	0
Inverness Caledonian Thistle	2025–26	Scottish League One	1	0	0	0	1	0	2	0	4	0
Career total			253	13	22	3	23	1	34	2	332	19
