= Ross Drummond (footballer) =

Scottish footballer (born 1994)

Personal information
- Date of birth: 20 March 1994 (age 32)
- Position: Left back

Team information
- Current team: Dundonald Bluebell

Youth career
- Burntisland Shipyard Amateur
- 2004–2011: Dunfermline Athletic

Senior career*
Years	Team	Apps	(Gls)
2011–2015	Dunfermline Athletic	10	(0)
2014	→ Berwick Rangers (loan)	11	(0)
2014	→ Berwick Rangers (loan)	7	(1)
2015–2016	Berwick Rangers	12	(0)
2016–	Dundonald Bluebell		
- * Club domestic league appearances and goals as of 13:13, 11 December 2015 (UTC)

Ross Drummond (born 20 March 1994) is a Scottish footballer who plays for Scottish Junior side Dundonald Bluebell.

== Career ==
Drummond began his career with Burntisland Shipyard Amateur before joining the Dunfermline Athletic youth team at under-10 level. He joined the Dunfermline first-team in November 2011, making his senior debut in October 2012. He moved on loan to Berwick Rangers in February 2014. He re-joined Berwick for a second loan spell in October 2014. Drummond's move to Berwick was made permanent in January 2015.

Drummond left Berwick at the end of the 2015–16 season, signing for Scottish Junior side Dundonald Bluebell shortly after.

== Career statistics ==
As of 11 December 2015

Club	Season	League		Scottish Cup		League Cup		Other		Total	
Club	Season	Apps	Goals	Apps	Goals	Apps	Goals	Apps	Goals	Apps	Goals
Dunfermline Athletic	2012–13	3	0	0	0	0	0	1	0	4	0
Dunfermline Athletic	2013–14	2	0	0	0	0	0	0	0	2	0
Dunfermline Athletic	2014–15	5	0	0	0	0	0	2	0	7	0
Dunfermline Athletic	Total	10	0	0	0	0	0	3	0	13	0
Berwick Rangers	2013–14	11	0	0	0	0	0	0	0	11	0
Berwick Rangers	2014–15	7	1	3	0	0	0	0	0	10	1
Berwick Rangers	2014–15	8	0	3	0	0	0	0	0	11	0
Berwick Rangers	2015–16	10	0	1	0	1	0	1	0	13	0
Berwick Rangers	Total	36	1	7	0	1	0	1	0	45	1
Career total		46	1	7	0	1	0	4	0	58	1
