= Ryan Goodfellow =

Scottish footballer

Personal information
- Full name: Ryan Lewis Goodfellow
- Date of birth: 26 May 1993 (age 33)
- Place of birth: Melrose, Scotland
- Position: Goalkeeper

Youth career
- 2007–2012: Dunfermline Athletic

Senior career*
| Years | Team | Apps | (Gls) |
| 2012–2015 | Dunfermline Athletic | 6 | (0) |
| 2015–2018 | East Fife | 44 | (0) |
| 2018–2019 | Cowdenbeath | 0 | (0) |
| 2019–2019 | → Berwick Rangers (loan) | 4 | (0) |
| 2019–2021 | Albion Rovers | 28 | (0) |
| 2021–2022 | Edinburgh City | 3 | (0) |
| 2022-2023 | Gala Fairydean | 0 | (0) |
- * Club domestic league appearances and goals as of 01:24, 15 January 2022 (UTC)

Ryan Lewis Goodfellow (born 26 May 1993) is a Scottish professional footballer who plays as a goalkeeper. A product of Dunfermline Athletic's youth system, Goodfellow has played for East Fife, Cowdenbeath, Berwick Rangers, Albion Rovers and Edinburgh City.

== Career ==
=== Early life ===
Born in Earlston, Scottish Borders, Goodfellow began his footballing career at the age of six with Earlston Rhymers Youth. As a boy he played for Hibernian and also spent some time at Celtic under Stevie Woods.

=== Dunfermline Athletic ===
While at Spartans at under-13 level, coach Paul Donnelly brought him to Dunfermline Athletic. where he spent four-years progressing through the club's youth academy before signing full-time with the under-19 squad in 2010. In 2012, he was promoted to the first team signing a one-year professional contract, where he benefited from first team coaches such as Jim Jefferies, Neil McCann, John Potter, as well as goalkeeping coaches Brian Potter and Andy Goram.

During the 2012–13 season he was a regular in the under-20 side that reached the Scottish Youth Cup Final against Celtic at Hampden Park on 1 May 2013. The Pars lost in the final 3–1, in which Goodfellow played the full match.

Goodfellow made his first team debut on 16 November 2013 in a Scottish League One match, coming off the bench for the injured Ryan Scully in a 3–0 win over Airdrieonians. His first league start came in a 1–1 draw against Ayr United on 19 April 2014, whilst also featuring twice against Rangers that season including a 1–1 draw at East End Park.

=== East Fife ===
On 18 May 2015, Goodfellow signed with Scottish League Two side East Fife. On Saturday 1 August 2015, in the first round of the Scottish League Cup, East Fife defeated Championship side Dumbarton in a penalty shoot-out, where Goodfellow saved two penalties to win the match after going behind. After playing the first 18 games of the season, he spent most of the second half of the season as back-up goalkeeper with the arrival of Liam Kelly from Rangers on loan. On 16 April 2016 East Fife drew 1–1 away to Clyde winning the league. Goodfellow made 19 league appearances in the 2015–16 season. On 28 January 2017, after a 0–0 draw with Stranraer, the club announced that Goodfellow had broken a club record by not conceding a goal in 575 minutes of football, which ended the following week, taking the record to 603 minutes.

=== Cowdenbeath ===
Goodfellow signed for Fife rivals Cowdenbeath on 28 June 2018, where he would join David McGurn to compete for the number one jersey during the 2018–19 season. He did not make a league appearance for Cowdenbeath and was loaned to Berwick Rangers in February 2019 where he made 6 appearances.

=== Albion Rovers ===
On 29 May 2019, Albion Rovers announced that Goodfellow had signed a one-year deal with the club for the 2019–20 season in Scottish League Two.

=== Edinburgh City ===
Goodfellow signed for Edinburgh City in January 2021. On 14 January 2022, it was confirmed that Goodfellow had left the club by mutual consent.

== Career statistics ==
As of 27 April 2020

Appearances and goals by club, season and competition
| Club | Season | League | | | Scottish Cup | | League Cup | | Other | | Total | |
| Club | Season | Division | Apps | Goals | Apps | Goals | Apps | Goals | Apps | Goals | Apps | Goals |
|---|---|---|---|---|---|---|---|---|---|---|---|---|
| Dunfermline Athletic | 2013–14 | Scottish League One | 4 | 0 | 0 | 0 | 0 | 0 | 0 | 0 | 4 | 0 |
| Dunfermline Athletic | 2014–15 | Scottish League One | 2 | 0 | 0 | 0 | 0 | 0 | 0 | 0 | 2 | 0 |
| Dunfermline Athletic | Total | | 6 | 0 | 0 | 0 | 0 | 0 | 0 | 0 | 6 | 0 |
| East Fife | 2015–16 | Scottish League Two | 19 | 0 | 2 | 0 | 2 | 0 | 1 (Note: Appearances in the Scottish Challenge Cup) | 0 | 24 | 0 |
| East Fife | 2016–17 | Scottish League One | 11 | 0 | 4 | 0 | 2 | 0 | 2 | 0 | 19 | 0 |
| East Fife | 2017–18 | Scottish League One | 14 | 0 | 2 | 0 | 4 | 0 | 0 | 0 | 20 | 0 |
| East Fife | Total | | 44 | 0 | 8 | 0 | 8 | 0 | 3 | 0 | 63 | 0 |
| Cowdenbeath | 2018–19 | Scottish League Two | 0 | 0 | 0 | 0 | 0 | 0 | 1 | 0 | 1 | 0 |
| Berwick Rangers (loan) | 2018-19 | Scottish League Two | 4 | 0 | 0 | 0 | 0 | 0 | 2 (Note: Appearances in the Scottish League Two play-offs) | 0 | 6 | 0 |
| Albion Rovers | 2019-20 | Scottish League Two | 22 | 0 | 0 | 0 | 2 | 0 | 1 | 0 | 25 | 0 |
| Career total | | | 76 | 0 | 8 | 0 | 10 | 0 | 7 | 0 | 101 | 0 |

== Honours ==
East Fife

- Scottish League Two: 2015-16
