= Willie Robertson (footballer) =

Scottish footballer (born 1993)

Personal information
- Full name: William Robertson
- Date of birth: 14 April 1993 (age 33)
- Place of birth: London, England
- Height: 1.78 m (5 ft 10 in)
- Position: Midfielder

Team information
- Current team: Petershill

Youth career
- –2012: Dundee United

Senior career*
Years	Team	Apps	(Gls)
2012–2013	Dundee United	0	(0)
2012–2013	→ Forfar Athletic (loan)	21	(0)
2013–2014	Alloa Athletic	9	(0)
2014–2016	Stirling Albion	44	(1)
2016	Annan Athletic	5	(0)
2017–2018	Stirling Albion	0	(0)
2019	East Kilbride		
2019–2023	Darvel		
2023–	Petershill		
- * Club domestic league appearances and goals as of 00:10, January 2019 (UTC)

William Robertson (born 14 April 1993) is a Scottish footballer who plays as a midfielder for West of Scotland League First Division club Petershill.

He has previously played for Dundee United, Forfar Athletic, Alloa Athletic, Annan Athletic, Stirling Albion and East Kilbride.

== Career ==
Robertson began his footballing career at Dundee United's Academy, and was loaned to Forfar Athletic in December 2012, making his debut on the 1st, scoring in a 2–1 home win over Ayr United. The loan was later extended until May 2013 on 4 January.

On 2 July 2013, Robertson signed for Alloa Athletic. He made his debut on 17 August 2013, in a 1–0 away loss against Dundee. His contract with Alloa expired at the end of the season, although he was offered the chance to return to the club for pre-season training.

On 26 July 2014, Robertson played for Stirling Albion as a trialist in their Scottish Challenge Cup match against Elgin City. Robertson signed a contract with Stirling soon afterwards. After two seasons with Albion, Robertson signed for Annan Athletic in July 2016. Robertson left Annan in October 2016, returning to Forthbank Stadium where he played 3 matches as a trialist for Stirling, before signing a contract with the club during the 2017 winter transfer window. Robertson left Albion in October 2018 due to work commitments.

Robertson signed with Lowland League team East Kilbride in January 2019.

== Career statistics ==
As of match played 21 October 2017

Appearances and goals by club, season and competition
Club	Season	League			Scottish Cup		League Cup		Other		Total	
Club	Season	Division	Apps	Goals	Apps	Goals	Apps	Goals	Apps	Goals	Apps	Goals
Forfar Athletic (loan)	2012–13	Second Division	20	0	1	1	0	0	2 (Note: Appearances in the First Division play-offs)	1	23	2
Alloa Athletic	2013–14	Championship	9	0	1	0	0	0	0	0	10	0
Stirling Albion	2014–15	League One	17	0	1	0	1	0	1 (Note: Appearances in the Scottish Challenge Cup)	0	20	0
Stirling Albion	2015–16	League Two	27	3	4	0	1	0	1	0	33	3
Stirling Albion	2016–17	League Two	8	0	2	0	0	0	0	0	10	0
Stirling Albion	2017–18	League Two	6	0	0	0	3	0	1	0	10	0
Stirling Albion	Stirling Albion total		58	3	7	0	5	0	3	0	73	3
Annan Athletic (loan)	2016–17	League Two	5	0	0	0	1	0	1	0	7	0
Career total			92	3	9	1	6	0	6	1	113	5
