= Luke Johnston =

Scottish footballer

Personal information
- Full name: Luke Johnston
- Date of birth: 3 September 1993 (age 33)
- Place of birth: Kirkcaldy, Scotland
- Position: Defender

Youth career
- Rangers
- 2008–2011: Perth Glory

Senior career*
Years	Team	Apps	(Gls)
2012–2014	Dundee United	2	(0)
2013	→ Dunfermline Athletic (loan)	5	(1)
2013–2014	→ Montrose (loan)	6	(0)
- * Club domestic league appearances and goals as of 6 July 2014

Luke Johnston (born 3 September 1993) is a Scottish professional footballer who formerly played for Dundee United, making two appearances in the Scottish Premier League in 2013. He also played for Dunfermline Athletic and Montrose on loan before leaving Dundee United in 2014.

== Career ==
Johnston was attached to Rangers as a youth player before his family emigrated to Australia when he was aged fourteen, where he played for Perth Glory. Returning to Scotland in November 2011, he joined Dundee United on a short-term contract in January 2012 and went on to make a number of appearances for the club's under-19 team. He signed a new contract in the close season of 2012 and began to feature in the first team squad towards the end of the campaign. Johnston made his first team debut as a substitute against Ross County in April 2013, and also played from the start in the next match against St Johnstone. He spent the next season on loan at Dunfermline Athletic and Montrose, but then left Dundee United at the end of the season following the expiry of his contract.

== Career statistics ==
As of 3 July 2013

Club statistics
Club	Season	League		Scottish Cup		League Cup		Europe		Other		Total	
Club	Season	App	Goals	App	Goals	App	Goals	App	Goals	App	Goals	App	Goals
Dundee United	2012–13	2	0	0	0	0	0	0	0	0	0	2	0
Dunfermline	2013-14	5	1	1	0	0	0	0	0	0	0	6	1
Montrose	2014-15	6	0	0	0	0	0	0	0	0	0	6	0
Total		2	0	0	0	0	0	0	0	0	0	2	0
