= Ivan D'Angelo =

Italian footballer

Personal information
- Place of birth: San Benedetto del Tronto, Italy
- Position: Midfielder

Youth career
- Ascoli

Senior career*
Years	Team	Apps	(Gls)
2010–2012	Sambenedettese		
2012–2013	Dunfermline Athletic	1	(0)
- * Club domestic league appearances and goals

Ivan D'Angelo is an Italian former professional footballer who plays as a midfielder.

== Career ==
Born in San Benedetto del Tronto, D'Angelo has played for Ascoli, Sambenedettese and Dunfermline Athletic.
