= Michal Hrivňák =

Slovak footballer

Personal information
- Full name: Michal Hrivňák
- Date of birth: 5 March 1991 (age 35)
- Place of birth: Rimavská Sobota, Czechoslovakia
- Height: 1.91 m (6 ft 3 in)
- Position: Goalkeeper

Youth career
- Rimavská Sobota
- Jozef Vengloš Academy
- 2008–2010: Brescia

Senior career*
Years	Team	Apps	(Gls)
2010–2012	Brescia	0	(0)
2011–2012	→ Civitanovese (loan)	0	(0)
2012–2013	Dunfermline Athletic	8	(0)
2013–2014	Spartak Trnava	0	(0)
2014	→ Šúrovce (loan)		
2014-	Slavoj Boleraz	?	(?)
- * Club domestic league appearances and goals as of TJ Slavoj Boleráz

Michal Hrivňák (born 5 March 1991) is a Slovak football goalkeeper.

== Club career ==
Hrivňák signed for Brescia in 2011; however he failed to make any appearances for the first team, instead playing a number of matches for their reserve squad. For the remainder of the 2011–12 season, he was loaned out to Serie C1 side Civitanovese.

In July 2012, Hrivňák joined Scottish First Division team Dunfermline Athletic on a one-year deal after impressing in a pre-season friendly against Scottish Third Division side Berwick Rangers. He made his first-team debut in December 2012 against Livingston, replacing injured first-choice keeper Paul Gallacher. In March 2013, with Dunfermline in administration and having released a number of players, including Gallacher, Hrivňák was promoted to first-choice keeper and played in the 2–2 draw against Livingston. From that on, Hrivňák was featured as a first-choice goalkeeper throughout the season and the club was relegated. In August, Hrivňák left Dunfermline Athletic by mutual consent after spending time on the bench ahead of the 2013–14 season and was replaced by loanee goalkeeper Ryan Scully. According to manager Jim Jefferies, Hrivňák's departure was due to not settling well.

Following his release from Dunfermline Athletic, Hrivňák returned to his homeland by signing for Spartak Trnava.
