= Paul Willis (Scottish footballer) =

Scottish footballer (born 1991)

Personal information
- Date of birth: 21 August 1991 (age 35)
- Place of birth: Edinburgh, Scotland
- Position: Midfielder

Youth career
- Livingston

Senior career*
Years	Team	Apps	(Gls)
2008–2013	Dunfermline Athletic	38	(1)
2011	→ Ayr United (loan)	6	(1)
2012–2013	→ East Fife (loan)	33	(4)
2013–2014	East Fife	11	(1)
2014	Kingston FC		
2014–2015	Berwick Rangers	34	(9)
2015–2017	Albion Rovers	56	(7)
2017–2018	East Fife	10	(0)
2018–2019	Berwick Rangers	29	(7)
2019	Peterhead	15	(1)
2019–2020	Stirling Albion	17	(0)
2020	Linlithgow Rose		
- * Club domestic league appearances and goals as of 13:30, 12 November 2020 (UTC)

Paul Willis (born 21 August 1991) is a Scottish footballer who last played as a midfielder for Linlithgow Rose.

Willis began his career with Dunfermline Athletic, and has also played for Ayr United, East Fife (three spells), Berwick Rangers (two spells), Albion Rovers, Peterhead and Stirling Albion, as well as for Canadian club Kingston FC.

== Career ==
Willis was signed for Dunfermline Athletic under-15s by Jim McArthur from local side Hutchison Vale. He progressed up the ranks playing for the under-17s for a season before being promoted to the under-19 squad for the 2007–2008 season. In February 2008, Willis was promoted to the Dunfermline Athletic first team squad after impressing at the lower levels. On 1 March 2008, Willis made his début against Livingston, being brought on for Alex Burke in the 83rd minute.

In June 2013, it was announced that Willis had signed with East Fife. It was mutually agreed to terminate his contract with East Fife in February 2014. After his release from East Fife he had a brief stint overseas in Canada with Kingston FC of the Canadian Soccer League. Willis signed for Berwick Rangers in July 2014. At the end of 2014–15 season, Willis signed for Scottish League One newcomers Albion Rovers on a one-year contract.

Willis played with Rovers for two seasons, before returning to Bayview to sign for East Fife on 25 May 2017. After failing to make an impact in Methil, Willis signed for Berwick Rangers on 31 January 2018, having previously played for the side 3-years earlier. Willis moved to Peterhead in January 2019, but would later sign for Stirling Albion in the summer, with the Binos announcing the transfer on 13 June 2019.

Willis signed with East of Scotland team Linlithgow Rose in July 2020. Willis departed the club on 12 November 2020.
