= Stephen Husband =

Scottish footballer

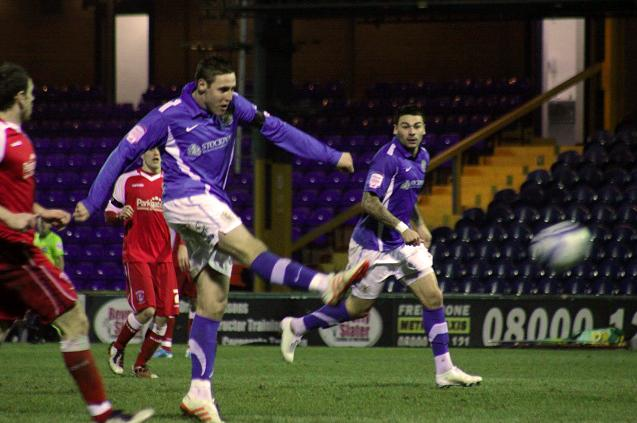

Personal information
- Full name: Stephen Husband
- Date of birth: 29 October 1990 (age 36)
- Place of birth: Kelty, Scotland
- Position: Midfielder

Team information
- Current team: Dundonald Bluebell (manager)

Youth career
- Cowdenbeath
- Heart of Midlothian

Senior career*
Years	Team	Apps	(Gls)
2006–2007	Cowdenbeath	5	(0)
2007–2010	Heart of Midlothian	0	(0)
2009	→ Livingston (loan)	7	(0)
2010–2012	Blackpool	3	(0)
2011	→ Stockport County (loan)	5	(2)
2012–2014	Dunfermline Athletic	63	(13)
2014–2015	Forfar Athletic	32	(2)
2015–2020	Kelty Hearts	121	(50)
2021–2022	Dundonald Bluebell		

Managerial career
- 2022–: Dundonald Bluebell
- * Club domestic league appearances and goals

Stephen Husband (born 29 October 1990) is a Scottish footballer who manages Dundonald Bluebell. He last played for Kelty Hearts.

== Early life ==
Husband was born in Kelty, Fife, and attended Beath High School.

== Club career ==
=== Early career in Scotland ===
Husband began his career at Scottish Second Division side Cowdenbeath, where he was at their Youth Academy where he played centre midfield . Manager Brian Welsh gave Husband his debut, at the age of 16, on 23 December 2006 as an 89th-minute substitute in a 5–2 win over Alloa Athletic at Central Park. His full debut came on 14 April 2007, in a 0–0 draw with Alloa Athletic at Recreation Park. He made a total of five appearances for Cowdenbeath.

In July 2007, Husband joined Scottish Premier League side Hearts' Youth Academy. He became a regular in the reserve team, competing in the Scottish Premier Reserve League. A year later on 25 July 2008 Husband signed his first professional contract, a three-year deal until 2011.

He scored three goals in the 2008–09 season as Hearts reserves finished as runners-up in the Reserve League.

At the start of the 2009–10 season Husband joined Scottish Third Division side Livingston on loan, making his debut on 29 August 2009, just a day after he had signed for the club, in a 0–1 defeat to Albion Rovers at Cliftonhill. He made a total of seven league and one cup appearances before returning to Hearts on 31 December at the completion of his loan spell.

Despite being a regular in the Hearts reserve team, Husband didn't make a first-team appearance for the club.

=== Blackpool ===
On 1 February 2010, Husband joined English Championship side Blackpool for a nominal fee, signing a two-and-a-half-year contract. The Edinburgh Evening News reported that the fee was £25,000 initially, rising to £100,000 with add-ons. Two days later, he was an unused substitute in a 3–2 home defeat to West Bromwich Albion. His debut came on 9 February as an 86th-minute substitute in a 2–0 defeat to Sheffield Wednesday at Hillsborough. He made his full debut on 20 March, in a 2–2 home draw with Crystal Palace.

On 7 January 2011 Husband joined Stockport County on loan for a month and was given the number 10 shirt. He made his club debut on 8 January in a 5–1 home defeat to Gillingham and scored his first and second goals for the club three days later against Rotherham. In his third match for the club, on 15 January against Hereford, he was sent off for a second bookable offence. He returned to Blackpool on 8 February at the end of his loan and has yet to play a game since his return.

Husband was released by Blackpool at the end of the 2011–2012 season, having just made 3 league appearances in just over 2 years (which all came in his first 2 months at the club).

=== Dunfermline Athletic ===
Following his departure from Blackpool he joined Scottish First Division side Dunfermline Athletic on trial and featured for them as a trialist during their pre-season friendlies. On 25 July 2012, Husband signed a two-year contract with the club. Husband made his debut on 18 August 2012, coming on as a substitute for Jordan McMillan, as Dunfermline Athletic lose 1–0 to and scored his first goal, which turns out to be a winner, as the club beat Airdrie United 2–1. On 17 November 2012, Husband scored twice and provided assist for Joe Cardle, as the club win 3–1 against Raith Rovers.

=== Forfar and Kelty Hearts ===
Husband signed for Scottish League One side Forfar Athletic in July 2014. Husband stayed with The Loons for one season, before moving to his hometown team Kelty Hearts in June 2015.

== Coaching career ==
He was appointed manager of Dundonald Bluebell in June 2022.

== Career statistics ==
As of 24 August 2010

Club performance			League		Cup		League Cup		Total	
Season	Club	League	Apps	Goals	Apps	Goals	Apps	Goals	Apps	Goals
Scotland			League		Scottish Cup		League Cup		Total	
2006–07	Cowdenbeath	Scottish Second Division	5	0	-		-		5	0
2009–10	Livingston (loan)	Scottish Third Division	7	0	1	0	-		7	0
England			League		FA Cup		League Cup		Total	
2009–10	Blackpool	Championship	3	0	-		-		3	0
2010–11	Blackpool	Premier League	0	0	0	0	1	0	1	0
2010–11	Stockport (loan)	Football League Two	5	2	-		-		5	2
2011–12	Blackpool	Championship	0	0	0	0	0	0	0	0
Scotland			League		Scottish Cup		League Cup		Total	
2012–13	Dunfermline	Scottish First Division	31	8	2	0	2	0	35	8
Total	Scotland		43	8	3	0	2	0	48	8
Total	England		8	2	0	0	1	0	9	2
Career total			51	10	3	0	3	0	57	10

== Honours ==
Blackpool

- Championship Play-off final winner: 2009–10

Kelty Hearts

- Lowland League: 2019–20
- Lowland League Play-offs Winner: 2017–18
- East of Scotland Football League: 2017–18
- East Region Super League: 2016–17
- East Region Super League runner-up: 2015–16
