= 2012–13 Scottish First Division =

Irn-Bru Scottish First Division
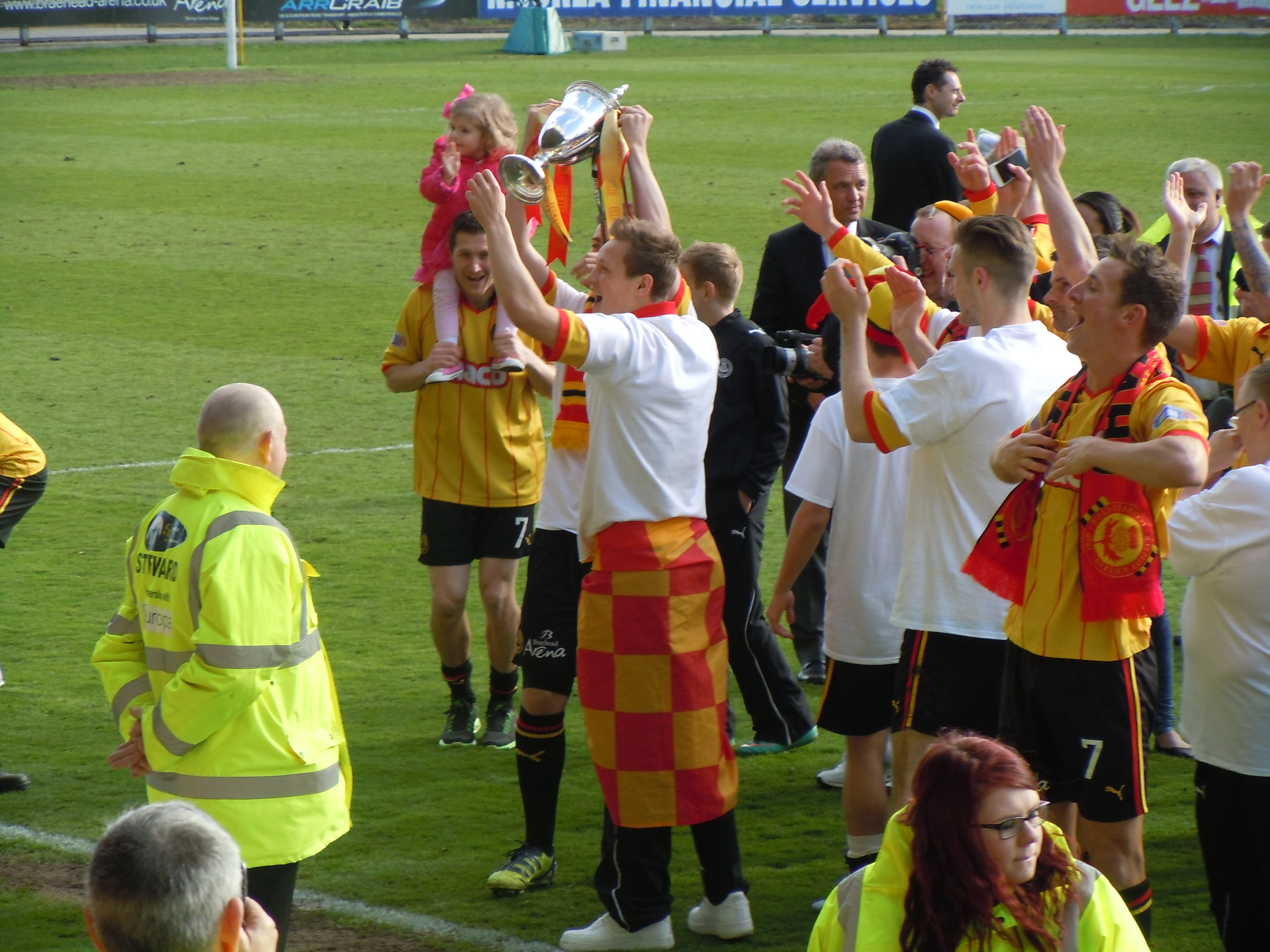
- Partick Thistle win the title
- Season: 2012–13
- Champions: Partick Thistle
- Promoted: Partick Thistle
- Relegated: Airdrie United; Dunfermline Athletic
- Matches: 180
- Goals: 568 (3.16 per match)
- Top goalscorer: Stevie May (25 goals)
- Biggest home win: Partick Thistle 7–0 Airdrie (29 September 2012)
- Biggest away win: Cowdenbeath 0–4 Dunfermline Athletic (11 August 2012); Airdrie United 0–4 Hamilton Academical (6 October 2012); Dumbarton 1–5 Greenock Morton (17 November 2012); Dunfermline Athletic 0–4 Partick Thistle (2 March 2013)
- Highest scoring: Cowdenbeath 4–4 Raith Rovers (20 October 2012)
- Longest winning run: 8 games Partick Thistle
- Longest unbeaten run: 16 games Partick Thistle
- Longest winless run: 14 games Cowdenbeath
- Longest losing run: 7 games Airdrie United
- Highest attendance: 8,875; Partick Thistle 1-0 Greenock Morton (10 April 2013)
- Lowest attendance: 409; Cowdenbeath 1–1 Livingston (22 December 2012)

The 2012–13 Scottish Football League First Division, also known as the 2012–13 Irn Bru Scottish Football League First Division for sponsorship reasons, was the 19th season of the Scottish Football League First Division and the 107th season of a second-tier football league in Scotland. Partick Thistle were confirmed as 2012–13 champions, on 20 April following their 2-0 win over Falkirk. This was the final season of the First Division under its then format, as it was replaced by the Scottish Championship from the 2013–14 season onwards.

== Teams ==
Ross County were promoted to the Scottish Premier League as champions, while Dunfermline Athletic were relegated from the SPL to this division.

Two sides were relegated from this division at the end of the 2011–12 season. Queen of the South, who finished bottom, and Ayr United in the play-offs. They were replaced by Second Division champions Cowdenbeath, and Dumbarton as winners of the promotion play-offs.

On 13 July, Rangers were admitted to the Third Division after being voted out of the SPL. As a result, the playoff losing finalist Airdrie United were promoted to the First Division to fill the gap caused by Dundee replacing Rangers in the SPL.

=== Stadia and Locations ===
Team	Location	Stadium	Capacity
Airdrie	Airdrie	Excelsior Stadium	10,171
Cowdenbeath	Cowdenbeath	Central Park	4,370
Dumbarton	Dumbarton	Dumbarton Football Stadium	2,025
Dunfermline Athletic	Dunfermline	East End Park	11,380
Falkirk	Falkirk	Falkirk Stadium	9,200
Greenock Morton	Greenock	Cappielow Park	11,100
Hamilton Academical	Hamilton	New Douglas Park	6,078
Livingston	Livingston	Almondvale Stadium	10,122
Partick Thistle	Glasgow	Firhill Stadium	10,887
Raith Rovers	Kirkcaldy	Stark's Park	10,104

=== Personnel and kits ===
Location of teams in 2012–13 Scottish First Division

Team	Manager	Kit manufacturer	Shirt sponsor
Airdrie	(Scotland) Jimmy Boyle	Puma	N/A (H,3rd), Advance Construction Scotland (A)
Cowdenbeath	(Scotland) Colin Cameron	Umbro	Subsea Pressure Controls
Dumbarton	(Scotland) Ian Murray	1872 (Club own brand)	Bet Butler
Dunfermline Athletic	(Scotland) Jim Jefferies	Joma	The Purvis Group
Falkirk	(Scotland) Gary Holt	Puma	Central Demolition
Greenock Morton	(Scotland) Allan Moore	Puma	Millions Chews
Hamilton Academical	(Scotland) Alex Neil (interim)	Nike	M&H Logistics (H), Life Skills Centres (A)
Livingston	(Scotland) Richie Burke	Adidas	Fasteq
Partick Thistle	(Scotland) Alan Archibald	Puma	macb
Raith Rovers	(Scotland) Grant Murray	Puma	Kittys Styx (H), Livesport.co.uk (A)

== League table ==
Pos	Team	Pld	W	D	L	GF	GA	GD	Pts	Promotion or relegation
1	Partick Thistle (C, P)	36	23	9	4	76	28	+48	78	Promotion to the Premiership
2	Greenock Morton	36	20	7	9	73	47	+26	67	
3	Falkirk	36	15	8	13	52	48	+4	53	
4	Livingston	36	14	10	12	58	56	+2	52	
5	Hamilton Academical	36	14	9	13	52	45	+7	51	
6	Raith Rovers	36	11	13	12	45	48	−3	46	
7	Dumbarton	36	13	4	19	58	83	−25	43	
8	Cowdenbeath	36	8	12	16	51	65	−14	36	
9	Dunfermline Athletic (R)	36	14	7	15	62	59	+3	34 (Note: Dunfermline Athletic were deducted 15 points for entering administration.)	Qualification for the First Division Play-offs
10	Airdrie United (R)	36	5	7	24	41	89	−48	22	Relegation to League One

Source: SPFL Archive
Rules for classification: 1) points; 2) goal difference; 3) number of goals scored.
(C) Champions; (P) Promoted; (R) Relegated

== Results ==
Teams play each other four times in this league. In the first half of the season each team plays every other team twice (home and away) and then do the same in the second half of the season, for a total of 36 games.

=== First half of season ===
Home \ Away	AIR	COW	DUM	DNF	FAL	GMO	HAM	LIV	PAR	RAI
Airdrie United		0–3	4–1	1–2	1–4	2–3	0–4	1–3	1–1	0–0
Cowdenbeath	1–1		0–1	0–4	1–1	3–4	1–0	1–1	0–3	4–4
Dumbarton	3–4	0–3		0–2	1–2	1–5	3–3	3–4	2–0	4–2
Dunfermline Athletic	1–3	3–0	4–0		0–1	2–2	1–1	4–0	0–1	3–1
Falkirk	1–1	2–0	3–4	2–2		0–1	2–1	1–2	0–0	0–2
Greenock Morton	2–0	1–0	3–0	4–2	1–2		0–1	2–2	3–1	1–0
Hamilton Academical	3–0	2–1	2–1	0–3	1–1	1–1		1–2	1–0	0–1
Livingston	0–2	1–1	5–0	2–1	2–1	2–2	0–0		1–2	2–1
Partick Thistle	7–0	2–1	3–0	5–1	3–1	1–2	4–0	2–0		3–2
Raith Rovers	2–0	2–2	2–2	1–3	2–1	3–3	2–0	0–0	1–1	

Updated to match(es) played on 16 April 2013. Source:
Legend: Blue = home team win; Yellow = draw; Red = away team win.

=== Second half of season ===
Home \ Away	AIR	COW	DUM	DNF	FAL	GMO	HAM	LIV	PAR	RAI
Airdrie United		1–1	1–2	3–3	0–1	0–4	2–2	0–2	1–2	1–2
Cowdenbeath	3–2		2–3	4–2	4–1	1–1	1–1	2–2	1–2	1–1
Dumbarton	4–1	2–2		0–1	0–2	0–3	3–1	0–3	0–0	1–2
Dunfermline Athletic	1–2	1–0	3–4		0–2	1–4	2–3	0–1	0–4	1–0
Falkirk	4–3	4–0	1–3	1–0		4–1	0–2	2–0	0–2	1–1
Greenock Morton	5–2	4–2	0–3	0–1	2–0		0–2	2–1	2–2	1–0
Hamilton Academical	5–0	1–3	2–3	1–2	1–1	2–1		1–1	0–2	2–0
Livingston	4–1	3–0	2–3	2–2	1–2	0–2	0–3		2–2	2–3
Partick Thistle	1–0	2–1	3–0	3–3	4–1	1–0	1–0	6–1		0–0
Raith Rovers	2–0	0–1	3–2	1–1	0–0	2–1	0–2	0–2	0–0	

Updated to match(es) played on 4 May 2013. Source:
Legend: Blue = home team win; Yellow = draw; Red = away team win.

== Play-offs ==
Times are BST (UTC+1)

=== Semi-finals ===
The fourth placed team in the Second Division (Forfar Athletic) played the ninth placed team in the First Division (Dunfermline Athletic) and the third placed team in the Second Division (Brechin City) played the second placed team in the Second Division (Alloa Athletic). The play-offs were played over two legs, the winning team in each semi-final advancing to the final.

Team 1	Agg.	Team 2	1st leg	2nd leg
Forfar Athletic	4–7	Dunfermline Athletic	3–1	1–6
Brechin City	3–4	Alloa Athletic	0–2	3–2

First legs

8 May 2013
7:45 pm

Forfar Athletic	3 – 1	Dunfermline Athletic
Robertson 34'; Templeman 37', 45'	BBC Sport	Husband 84'

Station Park
Attendance: 1,562
Referee: Allan

8 May 2013
7:45 pm

Brechin City	0 – 2	Alloa Athletic
	BBC Sport	McCord 40'; Moon 56'

Glebe Park
Attendance: 582
Referee: Madden

Second legs

11 May 2013
3:00 pm

Dunfermline Athletic	6 – 1 (a.e.t.)	Forfar Athletic
Dunlop 36' (o.g.); Thomson 62'; Millen 83' (pen.); Smith 102'; Husband 110', 118'	BBC Sport	Campbell 6', (yellow card) 85' (red card); McCulloch (red card) 15'; Dunlop (red card) 54'

East End Park
Attendance: 4,252
Referee: O'Reilly

11 May 2013
3:00 pm

Alloa Athletic	2 – 3	Brechin City
Cawley 36'; Elliot 68'	BBC Sport	Jackson 4', 90'; Trouten 52' (pen.)

Recreation Park
Attendance: 856
Referee: Collum

=== Final ===
The two semi-final winners played each other over two legs. The winning team was awarded a place in the 2013–14 First Division.

Team 1	Agg.	Team 2	1st leg	2nd leg
Alloa Athletic	3 – 1	Dunfermline Athletic	3 – 0	0 – 1

First leg

15 May 2013
7:55 pm

Alloa Athletic	3 – 0	Dunfermline Athletic
Tiffoney 27'; Elliot 45'; Moon 90'	BBC Sport

Recreation Park
Attendance: 2,765
Referee: McLean

Second leg

19 May 2013
4:05 pm

Dunfermline Athletic	1 – 0	Alloa Athletic
Smith 72'; Husband (red card) 85'	BBC Sport

East End Park
Attendance: 5,110
Referee: Thomson
