= 2011–12 Hamilton Academical F.C. season =

Hamilton Academical
2011–12 season
- Chairman: Ronnie MacDonald
- Manager: Billy Reid
- Stadium: New Douglas Park
- Scottish First Division: Fourth place
- Challenge Cup: Runners-up
- League Cup: Second round
- Scottish Cup: Fourth round
- Top goalscorer: League: Jon McShane (9); All: Jon McShane (9)
- Highest home attendance: 2,401 vs. Partick Thistle, 13 January 2012
- Lowest home attendance: 1,276 vs. Raith Rovers, 21 February 2012
- Average home league attendance: 1,770
Home colours	Away colours	Third colours

The 2011–12 season was Hamilton Academical's first season back in the Scottish First Division, having been relegated from the Scottish Premier League at the end of the 2010–11 season. Hamilton also competed in the Challenge Cup, League Cup and the Scottish Cup.

== Summary ==
Hamilton finished fourth in the First Division. They reached the second round of the League Cup, the fourth round of the Scottish Cup and lost 1–0 to Falkirk in the final of the Challenge Cup.

== Results and fixtures ==
Win Draw Loss Postponed

=== Pre-season ===
8 July 2011 Friendly	Berwick Rangers	0–2	Hamilton Academical	Shielfield Park, Berwick-upon-Tweed
		Hamilton Report	Trialist 5' (pen.); Anderson 74'

12 July 2011 Friendly	Gretna 2008	0–4	Hamilton Academical	Raydale Park, Gretna
		Hamilton Report	Anderson; McLaughlin; Mensing; Kirkpatrick	Attendance: 180

17 July 2011 Friendly	Hamilton Academical	1–2	Huddersfield Town	New Douglas Park, Hamilton
	Anderson 39'	Hamilton FC Report	Ward 4'; Lee 23'	Attendance: 820; Referee: Conroy

=== Scottish First Division ===
6 August 2011 First Division	Ayr United	1–2	Hamilton Academical	Somerset Park, Ayr
	McGowan 8'	BBC Sport	McLaughlin 29', 57'	Attendance: 1,750; Referee: Salmond

13 August 2011 First Division	Hamilton Academical	5–1	Ross County	New Douglas Park, Hamilton
	McLaughlin 23'; Crawford 39'; Chambers 42' (pen.); Paterson 57'; Anderson 90'	BBC Sport	Flynn (red card) 41'; Byrne 77'	Attendance: 1,744; Referee: Murray

20 August 2011 First Division	Partick Thistle	1–1	Hamilton Academical	Firhill Stadium, Glasgow
	Elliot 66'	BBC Sport	Mensing 76'	Attendance: 2,501; Referee: Brines

27 August 2011 First Division	Hamilton Academical	1–1	Livingston	New Douglas Park, Hamilton
	McLaughlin (red card) 53'; Mensing (yellow card) 64' (red card); Crawford 78'	BBC Sport	Boulding 90'	Attendance: 2,051; Referee: Charleston

10 September 2011 First Division	Queen of the South	1–0	Hamilton Academical	Palmerston Park, Dumfries
	Johnston 51'	BBC Sport		Attendance: 1,514; Referee: Richmond

17 September 2011 First Division	Hamilton Academical	2–2	Raith Rovers	New Douglas Park, Hamilton
	Spence 66'; Lyle 73'	BBC Sport	Baird 45'; Hamill 62'	Attendance: 1,982; Referee: Finnie

24 September 2011 First Division	Dundee	0–1	Hamilton Academical	Dens Park, Dundee
		BBC Sport	McLaughlin 66'	Attendance: 4,186; Referee: Madden

1 October 2011 First Division	Hamilton Academical	0–1	Falkirk	New Douglas Park, Hamilton
		BBC Sport	El Alagui 39'	Attendance: 2,367; Referee: Norris

15 October 2011 First Division	Greenock Morton	0–2	Hamilton Academical	Cappielow Park, Greenock
		BBC Sport	Currie 72'; Anderson 77'	Attendance: 2,264; Referee: Salmond

22 October 2011 First Division	Ross County	1–0	Hamilton Academical	Victoria Park, Dingwall
	Munro 31'	BBC Sport		Attendance: 2,431; Referee: Allan

29 October 2011 First Division	Hamilton Academical	2–3	Ayr United	New Douglas Park, Hamilton
	Currie 17' (pen.); Spence 45'	BBC Sport	Moffat 52'; Robertson 57'; Smith 90'	Attendance: 1,699; Referee: Somers

5 November 2011 First Division	Hamilton Academical	3–1	Queen of the South	New Douglas Park, Hamilton
	Paterson 17'; Imrie 82'; Anderson 90+2'	BBC Sport	Smith 31'	Attendance: 1,836; Referee: Salmond

12 November 2011 First Division	Livingston	1–0	Hamilton Academical	Braidwood Motor Company Stadium, Livingston
	McNulty 52'	BBC Sport		Attendance: 1,738; Referee: McKendrick

26 November 2011 First Division	Raith Rovers	3–2	Hamilton Academical	Stark's Park, Kirkcaldy
	Holt 9'; Prychynenko 61'; Smith 79'	BBC Sport	Imrie 16'; McLaughlin 90'	Attendance: 1,416; Referee: O'Reilly

3 December 2011 First Division	Hamilton Academical	1–6	Dundee	New Douglas Park, Hamilton
	Imrie 86'	SFL Report	Milne 21', 37', 49'; O'Donnell 39'; Riley 71'; Rae 83'	Attendance: 1,964; Referee: Tumilty

10 December 2011 First Division	Falkirk	0–0	Hamilton Academical	Falkirk Stadium, Falkirk
		SFL Report		Attendance: 3,024; Referee: Thomson

17 December 2011 First Division	Hamilton Academical	P–P	Greenock Morton	New Douglas Park, Hamilton

26 December 2011 First Division	Hamilton Academical	0–1	Livingston	New Douglas Park, Hamilton
		SFL Report	Barr 70'	Attendance: 1,546; Referee: Charleston

2 January 2012 First Division	Queen of the South	1–2	Hamilton Academical	Palmerston Park, Dumfries
	McGuffie 82'	BBC Sport	Imrie 5', 15'; McLaughlin (yellow card) 71' (yellow-red card)	Attendance: 1,282; Referee: Hilland

13 January 2012 First Division	Hamilton Academical	1–0	Partick Thistle	New Douglas Park, Hamilton
	Spence 87'	BBC Sport	Archibald (red card) 90'	Attendance: 2,401; Referee: Tumilty

21 January 2012 First Division	Ayr United	2–2	Hamilton Academical	Somerset Park, Ayr
	Dodd 32'; Malone 45'	BBC Sport	Spence 46'; Redmond 53'	Attendance: 1,310; Referee: Richmond

28 January 2012 First Division	Hamilton Academical	P–P	Raith Rovers	New Douglas Park, Hamilton

11 February 2012 First Division	Dundee	2–2	Hamilton Academical	Dens Park, Dundee
	Conroy 53'; Milne 79' (pen.)	SFL Report	McShane 12'; Routledge 85'	Attendance: 4,065; Referee: Salmond

14 February 2012 First Division	Hamilton Academical	1–2	Greenock Morton	New Douglas Park, Hamilton
	Ryan 85'	SFL Report	Campbell 24'; O'Brien 29'	Attendance: 1,356; Referee: Conroy

18 February 2012 First Division	Hamilton Academical	0–1	Falkirk	New Douglas Park, Hamilton
		SFL Report	Dods 45'	Attendance: 1,843; Referee: McLean

21 February 2012 First Division	Hamilton Academical	2–1	Raith Rovers	New Douglas Park, Hamilton
	Canning 45'; Mensing 63'	SFL Report	Graham 59'	Attendance: 1,276; Referee: McKendrick

25 February 2012 First Division	Greenock Morton	1–2	Hamilton Academical	Cappielow Park, Greenock
	O'Brien 85'	SFL Report	McShane 11'; Ryan 30'	Attendance: 1,594; Referee: Beaton

3 March 2012 First Division	Partick Thistle	2–0	Hamilton Academical	Firhill Stadium, Glasgow
	Doolan 18'; Erskine 65'	SFL Report		Attendance: 2,111; Referee: Finnie

10 March 2012 First Division	Hamilton Academical	0–2	Ross County	New Douglas Park, Hamilton
		SFL Report	McMenamin 7'; Boyd 16'	Attendance: 1,743; Referee: McKendrick

16 March 2012 First Division	Livingston	P–P	Hamilton Academical	Braidwood Motor Company Stadium, Livingston
		Livingston Report		Referee: O'Reilly

17 March 2012 First Division	Livingston	0–4	Hamilton Academical	Braidwood Motor Company Stadium, Livingston
	Talbot (red card) 11'	Livingston Report	McShane 3'; Redmond 12'; Routledge 28', 81'	Attendance: 1,066; Referee: O'Reilly

20 March 2012 First Division	Hamilton Academical	3–1	Dundee	New Douglas Park, Hamilton
	McLaughlin 35'; McShane 50'; Stewart 56'	SFL Report	Conroy 30' (pen.)	Attendance: 1,366; Referee: Muir

24 March 2012 First Division	Hamilton Academical	3–0	Queen of the South	New Douglas Park, Hamilton
	Spence 72'; Redmond 84'; Ryan 90'	BBC Sport		Attendance: 1,631; Referee: Norris

7 April 2012 First Division	Raith Rovers	2–1	Hamilton Academical	Stark's Park, Kirkcaldy
	Casalinuovo 55'; Walker 61'	BBC Sport	McLaughlin 23'	Attendance: 1,526; Referee: Charleston

10 April 2012 First Division	Falkirk	3–0	Hamilton Academical	Falkirk Stadium, Falkirk
	Millar 58' (pen.), 60'; El Alagui 81'	SFL Report	Hutton (red card) 56'	Attendance: 2,461; Referee: Allan

14 April 2012 First Division	Hamilton Academical	4–3	Greenock Morton	New Douglas Park, Hamilton
	Weatherson 16' (o.g.); McShane 17', 51'; Mensing 63'; Neil (yellow card) 72' (yellow-red card)	BBC Sport	Mensing 78' (o.g.); McGeouch 84'; Young 89'	Attendance: 1,423; Referee: Somers

21 April 2012 First Division	Hamilton Academical	3–2	Ayr United	New Douglas Park, Hamilton
	McShane 24', 89'; Redmond 58'	SFL Report	Roberts 17'; McGowan 59'	Attendance: 1,645; Referee: Charleston

28 April 2012 First Division	Ross County	5–1	Hamilton Academical	Victoria Park, Dingwall
	McMenamin 5'; Brittain 40', 54'; Kettlewell 46'; Gardyne 77'	SFL Report	McAlister 45'	Attendance: 4,737; Referee: Norris

5 May 2012 First Division	Hamilton Academical	2–2	Partick Thistle	New Douglas Park, Hamilton
	Redmond 26'; McShane 30'; McLaughlin (red card) 77'	BBC Sport	Bannigan 36'; Welsh 42'	Attendance: 1,978; Referee: McKendrick

=== Scottish Challenge Cup ===
23 July 2011 Scottish Challenge Cup round 1	Queen's Park	0–2	Hamilton Academical	Hampden Park, Glasgow
		Hamilton Report	Crawford 72'; Hopkirk 81'	Attendance: 748; Referee: Colvin

9 August 2011 Scottish Challenge Cup round 2	Hamilton Academical	1–0	Partick Thistle	New Douglas Park, Hamilton
	Chambers 86' (pen.)	BBC Sport		Attendance: 1,362; Referee: Thomson

4 September 2011 Scottish Challenge Cup quarter-finals	Hamilton Academical	2–1	Greenock Morton	New Douglas Park, Hamilton
	Spence 18'; Mensing 33'	BBC Sport	Di Giacomo 10'	Attendance: 1,496; Referee: O'Reilly

9 October 2011 Scottish Challenge Cup Semi-finals	Hamilton Academical	1–0	Livingston	New Douglas Park, Hamilton
	McLaughlin 43'	BBC Sport		Attendance: 1,418; Referee: Richmond

1 April 2012 Scottish Challenge Cup Final	Falkirk	1–0	Hamilton Academical	Braidwood Motor Company Stadium, Livingston
	Dods 2'	BBC Sport		Attendance: 5,210; Referee: Winter

=== Scottish League Cup ===
23 August 2011 Scottish League Cup round 2	Hamilton Academical	1–2	Ross County	New Douglas Park, Hamilton
	Chambers 2' (pen.)	BBC Sport	Gardyne 65'; Craig 82'	Attendance: 828; Referee: Tumilty

=== Scottish Cup ===
7 January 2012 Scottish Cup round 4	St Mirren	0–0	Hamilton Academical	St Mirren Park, Paisley
		BBC Sport		Attendance: 3,091; Referee: Collum

17 January 2012 Scottish Cup round 4 replay	Hamilton Academical	0–1	St Mirren	New Douglas Park, Hamilton
		BBC Sport	Carey 21'	Attendance: 1,520; Referee: Collum

== Player statistics ==
=== Captains ===
No.	P	Name	Country	No. games	Notes
	MF	Alex Neil	(Scotland)	18	Club captain

Last updated: 5 May 2012
Source: Competitive match reports.
Competitive matches only
Matches started as captain only
Country: FIFA nationality; No.: Squad number; P: Position; Name: Player name; No. Games: Number of games started as captain.

=== Squad ===
Last updated 5 May 2012

No.	Pos	Nat	Player	Total		Scottish First Division		Scottish Cup		League Cup		Challenge Cup	
No.	Pos	Nat	Player	Apps	Goals	Apps	Goals	Apps	Goals	Apps	Goals	Apps	Goals
	GK	(Czech Republic) CZE	Tomáš Černý	17	0	11+0	0	1+0	0	1+0	0	4+0	0
	GK	(Scotland) SCO	Brian Potter	0	0	0+0	0	0+0	0	0+0	0	0+0	0
	GK	(Scotland) SCO	Alan Combe	1	0	1+0	0	0+0	0	0+0	0	0+0	0
	GK	(Scotland) SCO	David Hutton	21	0	18+1	0	1+0	0	0+0	0	1+0	0
	GK	(Scotland) SCO	Scott Christie	3	0	3+0	0	0+0	0	0+0	0	0+0	0
	GK	(Scotland) SCO	Blair Currie	4	0	3+1	0	0+0	0	0+0	0	0+0	0
	DF	(Scotland) SCO	Grant Gillespie	19	0	12+3	0	1+0	0	1+0	0	2+0	0
	DF	(Scotland) SCO	James Gibson	0	0	0+0	0	0+0	0	0+0	0	0+0	0
	DF	(Scotland) SCO	Michael Devlin	3	0	1+2	0	0+0	0	0+0	0	0+0	0
	DF	(Scotland) SCO	Lee Kilday	19	0	13+1	0	2+0	0	1+0	0	2+0	0
	DF	(Scotland) SCO	Ziggy Gordon	10	0	7+1	0	0+0	0	1+0	0	1+0	0
	DF	(Scotland) SCO	Stephen Hendrie	31	0	22+3	0	2+0	0	0+0	0	2+2	0
	DF	(Scotland) SCO	Martin Canning	38	1	31+1	1	2+0	0	1+0	0	3+0	0
	DF	(Scotland) SCO	Mark McLaughlin	29	8	23+0	7	2+0	0	0+0	0	4+0	1
	DF	(Scotland) SCO	Gary Fraser	4	0	3+1	0	0+0	0	0+0	0	0+0	0
	DF	(Scotland) SCO	Jordan Jivanda	1	0	1+0	0	0+0	0	0+0	0	0+0	0
	DF	(Scotland) SCO	Craig Watson	1	0	0+1	0	0+0	0	0+0	0	0+0	0
	MF	(Scotland) SCO	Alex Neil	18	0	17+0	0	0+0	0	0+0	0	1+0	0
	MF	(Scotland) SCO	Jim McAlister	44	1	36+0	1	2+0	0	1+0	0	5+0	0
	MF	(Scotland) SCO	Kyle Wilkie	2	0	0+1	0	0+0	0	0+1	0	0+0	0
	MF	(Republic of Ireland) IRL	James Chambers	14	4	5+4	2	0+0	0	1+0	1	2+2	1
	MF	(Scotland) SCO	Ali Crawford	26	2	16+3	1	2+0	0	0+1	0	3+1	1
	MF	(Scotland) SCO	Andy Ryan	25	3	13+8	3	2+0	0	0+0	0	1+1	0
	MF	(Scotland) SCO	Jordan Kirkpatrick	9	0	2+5	0	0+0	0	0+0	0	2+0	0
	MF	(Scotland) SCO	Conner McGlinchey	1	0	1+0	0	0+0	0	0+0	0	0+0	0
	MF	(England) ENG	Jon Routledge	11	0	11+0	0	0+0	0	0+0	0	0+0	0
	MF	(England) ENG	Simon Mensing	42	4	34+0	3	2+0	0	1+0	0	5+0	1
	MF	(Scotland) SCO	Grant Anderson	25	3	7+13	3	2+0	0	0+1	0	1+1	0
	MF	(Scotland) SCO	Paul Currie	10	2	3+6	2	1+0	0	0+0	0	0+0	0
	MF	(Scotland) SCO	Kevin McBride	6	0	5+1	0	0+0	0	0+0	0	0+0	0
	MF	(England) ENG	Daniel Redmond	19	5	18+0	5	0+0	0	0+0	0	1+0	0
	MF	(England) ENG	Jon Routledge	6	3	4+1	3	0+0	0	0+0	0	1+0	0
	MF	(Scotland) SCO	Graeme MacGregor	1	0	0+1	0	0+0	0	0+0	0	0+0	0
	FW	(Scotland) SCO	David Hopkirk	5	1	1+2	0	0+0	0	0+0	0	2+0	1
	FW	(Scotland) SCO	Derek Lyle	13	1	3+6	1	0+0	0	0+0	0	3+1	0
	FW	(Scotland) SCO	Louis Longridge	2	0	1+1	0	0+0	0	0+0	0	0+0	0
	FW	(Scotland) SCO	Willie McLaren	7	0	0+3	0	0+0	0	1+0	0	1+2	0
	FW	(Scotland) SCO	Dougie Imrie	26	5	18+1	5	2+0	0	1+0	0	3+1	0
	FW	(Scotland) SCO	Kieran Millar	2	0	2+0	0	0+0	0	0+0	0	0+0	0
	FW	(Scotland) SCO	Matt Paterson	17	2	10+3	2	0+0	0	1+0	0	2+1	0
	FW	(Scotland) SCO	Greig Spence	34	6	11+18	5	1+1	0	0+0	0	1+2	1
	FW	(Scotland) SCO	Gordon Smith	3	0	3+0	0	0+0	0	0+0	0	0+0	0
	FW	(Scotland) SCO	Jon McShane	18	9	17+0	9	0+0	0	0+0	0	1+0	0
	FW	(Scotland) SCO	James Martin	2	0	1+0	0	0+1	0	0+0	0	0+0	0
	FW	(Scotland) SCO	Mark Stewart	14	1	8+5	1	0+0	0	0+0	0	1+0	0

=== Disciplinary record ===
Includes all competitive matches.

Last updated 5 May 2012

Nation	Position	Name	Scottish First Division		Scottish Cup		League Cup		Challenge Cup		Total	
Nation	Position	Name	Yellow card	Red card	Yellow card	Red card	Yellow card	Red card	Yellow card	Red card	Yellow card	Red card
(Czech Republic)	GK	Tomáš Černý	0	0	0	0	0	0	0	0	0	0
(Scotland)	GK	Brian Potter	0	0	0	0	0	0	0	0	0	0
(Scotland)	GK	David Hutton	1	1	0	0	0	0	0	0	1	1
(Scotland)	GK	Scott Christie	0	0	0	0	0	0	0	0	0	0
(Scotland)	GK	Blair Currie	1	0	0	0	0	0	0	0	1	0
(Scotland)	DF	Grant Gillespie	4	0	0	0	0	0	1	0	5	0
(Scotland)	DF	James Gibson	0	0	0	0	0	0	0	0	0	0
(Scotland)	DF	Michael Devlin	0	0	0	0	0	0	0	0	0	0
(Scotland)	DF	Lee Kilday	2	0	0	0	0	0	0	0	2	0
(Scotland)	DF	Ziggy Gordon	2	0	0	0	1	0	0	0	3	0
(Scotland)	DF	Stephen Hendrie	1	0	0	0	0	0	0	0	1	0
(Scotland)	DF	Martin Canning	4	0	0	0	0	0	2	0	6	0
(Scotland)	DF	Mark McLaughlin	10	2	0	0	0	0	0	0	10	2
(Scotland)	DF	Gary Fraser	1	0	0	0	0	0	0	0	1	0
(Scotland)	DF	Jordan Jivanda	0	0	0	0	0	0	0	0	0	0
(Scotland)	DF	Craig Watson	0	0	0	0	0	0	0	0	0	0
(Scotland)	MF	Alex Neil	6	1	0	0	0	0	0	0	6	1
(Scotland)	MF	Jim McAlister	2	0	1	0	0	0	1	0	4	0
(Scotland)	MF	Kyle Wilkie	0	0	0	0	0	0	0	0	0	0
(Republic of Ireland)	MF	James Chambers	1	0	0	0	0	0	0	0	1	0
(Scotland)	MF	Ali Crawford	0	0	0	0	0	0	0	0	0	0
(Scotland)	MF	Andy Ryan	1	0	0	0	0	0	0	0	1	0
(Scotland)	MF	Jordan Kirkpatrick	0	0	0	0	0	0	0	0	0	0
(Scotland)	MF	Conner McGlinchey	1	0	0	0	0	0	0	0	1	0
(England)	MF	Jon Routledge	4	0	0	0	0	0	0	0	4	0
(Scotland)	MF	Graeme MacGregor	0	0	0	0	0	0	0	0	0	0
(England)	MF	Simon Mensing	12	1	1	0	1	0	0	0	14	1
(Scotland)	MF	Grant Anderson	2	0	0	0	0	0	0	0	2	0
(Scotland)	MF	Paul Currie	0	0	0	0	0	0	0	0	0	0
(Scotland)	MF	Kevin McBride	1	0	0	0	0	0	0	0	1	0
(England)	MF	Daniel Redmond	2	0	0	0	0	0	0	0	2	0
(England)	MF	Jon Routledge	2	0	0	0	0	0	0	0	2	0
(Scotland)	FW	David Hopkirk	0	0	0	0	0	0	0	0	0	0
(Scotland)	FW	Derek Lyle	0	0	0	0	0	0	0	0	0	0
(Scotland)	FW	Louis Longridge	0	0	0	0	0	0	0	0	0	0
(Scotland)	FW	Willie McLaren	1	0	0	0	0	0	0	0	1	0
(Scotland)	FW	Dougie Imrie	4	0	0	0	0	0	2	0	6	0
(Scotland)	FW	Kieran Millar	1	0	0	0	0	0	0	0	1	0
(Scotland)	FW	Matt Paterson	1	0	0	0	0	0	0	0	1	0
(Scotland)	FW	Greig Spence	1	0	0	0	0	0	0	0	1	0
(Scotland)	FW	Gordon Smith	2	0	0	0	0	0	0	0	2	0
(Scotland)	FW	Jon McShane	1	0	0	0	0	0	0	0	1	0
(Scotland)	FW	James Martin	0	0	0	0	0	0	0	0	0	0
(Scotland)	FW	Mark Stewart	0	0	0	0	0	0	0	0	0	0

=== Awards ===
Last updated 5 May 2012

Nation	Name	Award	Month
(Scotland)	Dougie Imrie	Player of the Month	August
(Scotland)	Andy Ryan	Young Player of the Month	February

== League table ==
Pos	Team	Pld	W	D	L	GF	GA	GD	Pts	Promotion, qualification or relegation
2	Dundee (P)	36	15	10	11	53	43	+10	55 (Note: Dundee were chosen to take the place of Rangers.)	Promotion to the Premier League
3	Falkirk	36	13	13	10	53	48	+5	52	
4	Hamilton Academical	36	14	7	15	55	56	−1	49	
5	Livingston	36	13	9	14	56	54	+2	48	
6	Partick Thistle	36	12	11	13	50	39	+11	47	

Source: SPFL Archive
Rules for classification: 1) points; 2) goal difference; 3) number of goals scored.
(P) Promoted

== Transfers ==
=== Players in ===
Player	From	Fee
(Scotland) Willie McLaren	(Scotland) Queen of the South	Free
(Scotland) Grant Anderson	(Scotland) Stenhousemuir	Free
(Scotland) David Hutton	(Scotland) Queen of the South	Free
(Scotland) Derek Lyle	(Scotland) Greenock Morton	Free
(Scotland) Matt Paterson	(England) Southend United	Loan
(Scotland) Greig Spence	(Scotland) Celtic	Loan
(Scotland) Paul Currie	(England) Berwick Rangers	Undisclosed
(Scotland) Kevin McBride	(Scotland) Hibernian	Free
(Scotland) Gordon Smith	(Scotland) Heart of Midlothian	Loan
(Scotland) Blair Currie	(Scotland) Rangers	Loan
(Scotland) Jon McShane	(Scotland) St Mirren	Loan
(England) Daniel Redmond	(England) Wigan Athletic	Loan
(Scotland) Mark Stewart	(England) Bradford City	Loan
(England) Jon Routledge	(England) Stockport County	Loan
(Scotland) Graeme MacGregor	(England) Bolton Wanderers	Loan
(Scotland) Louis Longridge		Free

=== Players out ===
Player	To	Fee
(Scotland) Grant Evans	(Scotland) Greenock Morton	Free
(Scotland) Andy Graham	(Scotland) Greenock Morton	Free
(Scotland) Gary McDonald	(England) Morecambe	Free
(Netherlands) Nigel Hasselbaink	(Scotland) St Mirren	Free
(Guadeloupe) Mickaël Antoine-Curier	(Cyprus) Ermis Aradippou	Free
(Scotland) Euan Lindsay	(Scotland) Largs Thistle	Free
(Scotland) Brian McQueen	(Scotland) Clyde	Free
(England) Gavin Skelton	(England) Barrow	Free
(Portugal) Flávio Paixão	(Iran) Tractor Sazi	Free
(Portugal) Marco Paixão	(Iran) Naft Tehran	Free
(Argentina) Damián Casalinuovo	(Scotland) Raith Rovers	Free
(Scotland) Sean Murdoch	(England) Accrington Stanley	Free
(Scotland) David Hopkirk	Free agent	Free
(Northern Ireland) David Buchanan	(England) Tranmere Rovers	Free
(England) Mark Carrington	(England) Bury	Free
(Republic of Ireland) David Elebert	(Iceland) Fylkir	Free
(England) Jon Routledge	(England) Stockport County	Free
(England) Tom Elliott	(England) Stockport County	Free
(Scotland) James Gibson	(Scotland) Maybole	Free
(Scotland) Darren Dolan	(Scotland) Sauchie	Free
(Scotland) Andy Kennedy	(Scotland) Cumnock	Free
(Scotland) Jordan McCue	Free agent	Free
(Scotland) Reece McGillion	(Scotland) Greenock Morton	Free
(Scotland) Scott Pittman	(Scotland) Broxburn Athletic	Free
(Scotland) Willie McLaren	(Scotland) Airdrie United	Loan
(Republic of Ireland) James Chambers	(Republic of Ireland) St Patrick's Athletic	Free
(Australia) Andy MacLean	Free agent	Free
(Scotland) Kevin McBride	(Scotland) Dundee	Free
(Scotland) Derek Lyle	(Scotland) Cowdenbeath	Free
(Scotland) Willie McLaren	(Scotland) Airdrie United	Free
(Scotland) Ryan Finnie	(Scotland) Dumbarton	Loan
(Scotland) Paul Currie	(Scotland) Musselburgh Athletic	Free
(Scotland) Dougie Imrie	(Scotland) St Mirren	£35,000
(Scotland) Lewis Milton	(Scotland) Armadale Thistle	Loan
(Scotland) Ciaran Johnston	(Scotland) Armadale Thistle	Loan
(Scotland) Michael Devlin	(Scotland) Stenhousemuir	Loan
(Czech Republic) Tomáš Černý	Free agent	Free
(Scotland) Conner McGlinchey	(Scotland) Berwick Rangers	Loan
(Scotland) Grant Anderson	(Scotland) Stenhousemuir	Loan
(Scotland) Kieran Millar	(Scotland) Stenhousemuir	Loan
