= 2010–11 Hamilton Academical F.C. season =

Hamilton Academical
2010–11 season
- Chairman: Ronnie MacDonald
- Manager: Billy Reid
- Stadium: New Douglas Park
- Scottish Premier League: 12th (relegated)
- Scottish Cup: Fifth round
- League Cup: Second round
- Top goalscorer: League: Mickael Antoine-Curier (4 goals); All: Mickael Antoine-Curier (5 goals)
- Highest home attendance: 5,356 vs. Rangers Scottish Premier League 11 September 2010
- Lowest home attendance: 1,054 vs. Alloa Scottish Cup 8 January 2011
Home colours	Away colours	Third colours

The 2010–11 season was the 124th season of competitive football by Hamilton Academical and the third back in the top-flight of Scottish football. Hamilton Academical competed in the Scottish Premier League, Scottish Cup and Scottish League Cup.

== Overview ==
Hamilton had a disappointing season seeing them relegated from the Scottish Premier League finishing in 12th place. They managed only 6 wins in all competitions out of the 42 fixtures played.

== Results and fixtures ==
=== Scottish Premier League ===
14 August 2010 SPL	Aberdeen	4–0	Hamilton	Pittodrie
	Hartley 18', 40', 64'; Diamond 50'	acciesfc		Attendance: 12,005; Referee: D McDonald

21 August 2010 SPL	Hamilton	0–4	Hearts	New Douglas Park
	Canning (red card) 75'	acciesfc	Elliot 6', 81'; Templeton 22'; Palazuelos (yellow card) 63' (red card); Kyle 76' (pen.)	Attendance: 2,899; Referee: S Finnie

28 August 2010 SPL	Inverness	0–1	Hamilton	Caledonian Stadium
		acciesfc	Imrie 1'	Attendance: 3,851; Referee: J McKendrick

11 September 2010 SPL	Hamilton	1–2	Rangers	New Douglas Park
	Bougherra 56' (Og.)	acciesfc	Jelavic 6'; Miller 90'	Attendance: 5,356; Referee: A Muir

18 September 2010 SPL	Hibernian	1–1	Hamilton	Easter Road
	Riordan 9'	acciesfc	Paixao 22'	Attendance: 11,294; Referee: E Norris

25 September 2010 SPL	Hamilton	2–2	Kilmarnock	New Douglas Park
	Paixao 15'; N Hasselbaink 38'	acciesfc	Hamill 83' (pen.); Sammon 89'	Attendance: 3,033; Referee: C Allan

2 October 2010 SPL	Celtic	3–1	Hamilton	Celtic Park
	S Maloney 25', 64'; Hooper 71'	acciesfc	M McLaughlin 3'	Attendance: 47,476; Referee: S O'Reilly

16 October 2010 SPL	St Mirren	2–2	Hamilton	St Mirren Park
	Higdon 60', 73'	acciesfc	Routledge 39' imrie 47'	Attendance: 3,577; Referee: W Collum

23 October 2010 SPL	Hamilton	1–2	St Johnstone	New Douglas Park
	Mensing 67' (pen.)	acciesfc	Parkin 19'; Grainger 86'	Attendance: 2,431; Referee: M Tumilty

30 October 2010 SPL	Motherwell	0–1	Hamilton	Fir Park Stadium
		acciesfc	Hasselbaink 15'	Attendance: 4,865; Referee: C Thomson

6 November 2010 SPL	Hamilton	0–1	Dundee United	New Douglas Park
		acciesfc	Goodwillie 76'	Attendance: 2,456; Referee: C Murray

10 November 2010 SPL	Kilmarnock	3–0	Hamilton	Rugby Park
	Gordon 34'; C Sammon 46', 52'	acciesfc		Attendance: 4,214; Referee: W Collum

13 November 2010 SPL	Hamilton	1–3	Inverness	New Douglas Park
	Imrie 29'	acciesfc	Rooney 49', 59'; Hayes 52'	Attendance: 2,019; Referee: S McLean

20 November 2010 SPL	Hearts	2–0	Hamilton	Tynecastle Stadium
	Skacel 32'; Templeton 52'	acciesfc		Attendance: 12,620; Referee: I Brines

27 November 2010 SPL	Hamilton	0–0	St Mirren	New Douglas Park
		acciesfc		Attendance: 2,280; Referee: M Levi

29 December 2010 SPL	Hamilton	0–1	Aberdeen	New Douglas Park
		acciesfc	Vernon 90'	Attendance: 2,968; Referee: C Thomson

1 January 2011 SPL	Hamilton	0–0	Motherwell	New Douglas Park
		acciesfc		Attendance: 3,171; Referee: S O'Reilly

12 January 2011 SPL	Hamilton	1–1	Celtic	New Douglas Park
	Mensing 27'; McAlister (red card); Mensing (red card)	acciesfc	Stokes 90' (pen.); Forrest (red card)	Attendance: 5,163; Referee: W Collum

15 January 2011 SPL	Rangers	4–0	Hamilton	Ibrox
	Weiss 25', 45'; S Whittaker 28' (pen.); Maurice Edu 82'	acciesfc		Attendance: 44,639; Referee: B Winter

22 January 2011 SPL	Inverness	1–1	Hamilton	Caledonian Stadium
	Sanchez 18'	acciesfc	Antoine-Curier 45' (pen.)	Attendance: 3,241; Referee: S Finnie

29 January 2011 SPL	Hamilton	1–1	Kilmarnock	New Douglas Park
	Antoine-Curier 14'	acciesfc	Sammon 80'; J Hamill (yellow card) 29' (red card)	Attendance: 2,680; Referee: B Winter

1 February 2011 SPL	St Johnstone	2–0	Hamilton	McDiarmid Park
	May 4', 47'	acciesfc		Attendance: 2,631; Referee: Euan Norris

12 February 2011 SPL	Hamilton	0–2	Hearts	New Douglas Park
		acciesfc	S Elliott 22', 46'	Attendance: 2,876; Referee: S O'Reilly

19 February 2011 SPL	Motherwell	1–0	Hamilton	Fir Park Stadium
	John Sutton 36' (pen.)	acciesfc		Attendance: 4,407; Referee: C Allan

22 February 2011 SPL	Aberdeen	1–0	Hamilton	Pittodrie Stadium
	C Maguire 30' (pen.)	acciesfc		Attendance: 7,019; Referee: S Finnie

26 February 2011 SPL	Hamilton	1–1	Dundee United	New Douglas Park
	Antoine-Curier 33' (pen.)	acciesfc	Shala 84'	Attendance: 2,011; Referee: A Muir

1 March 2011 SPL	Hamilton	1–2	Hibernian	New Douglas Park
	F Paixao 90'	acciesfc	Sodje 37'; D Riordan 75'	Attendance: 2,619; Referee: G Salmond

5 March 2011 SPL	Celtic	2–0	Hamilton	Celtic Park
	Commons 41', 53'	acciesfc		Attendance: 51,811; Referee: S O'Reilly

10 March 2011 SPL	Dundee United	2–1	Hamilton	Tannadice
	Goodwillie 42'; Daly 90'	acciesfc	F Paixao 26'	Attendance: 5,766; Referee: W Collum

19 March 2011 SPL	Hamilton	0–0	St Johnstone	New Douglas Park
		acciesfc		Attendance: 2,111; Referee: B Madden

2 April 2011 SPL	St Mirren	3–1	Hamilton	St Mirren Park
	Higdon 61', 64' (pen.), 71'	BBC SPORT	Buchanan 43'; Canning (red card) 64'	Attendance: 4,985; Referee: Collum

10 April 2011 SPL	Hamilton	0–1	Rangers	New Douglas Park
		BBC SPORT	Jelavić 44'	Attendance: 4,526; Referee: Muir

17 April 2011 SPL	Hibernian	1–2	Hamilton	Easter Road
	Sodje 66'	BBC SPORT	Chambers 9'; Miller 34' (o.g.)	Attendance: 8,173; Referee: Winter

25 April 2011 SPL	Hamilton	1–1	Aberdeen	New Douglas Park
	Imrie 64'	BBC SPORT	Blackman 75'	Attendance: 2,140; Referee: Murray

2 May 2011 SPL	St Mirren	0–1	Hamilton	St Mirren Park
	Travner (yellow card) 24' (red card)	BBC SPORT	Antoine-Curier 74'; Neil (yellow card) 80' (red card)	Attendance: 5,037; Referee: Thomson

7 May 2011 SPL	Hamilton	1–0	Hibernian	New Douglas Park
	Hasselbaink 38'	BBC SPORT	Dickoh (yellow card) 43' (red card)	Attendance: 2,300; Referee: Mike Tumilty

10 May 2011 SPL	St Johnstone	1–0	Hamilton	McDiarmid Park
	Craig 29' (pen.)	BBC Sport	McLaughlin (red card) 28'	Attendance: 2,253; Referee: Steve Conroy

14 May 2011 SPL	Hamilton	1–2	Inverness	New Douglas Park
	Mensing 50'	BBC Sport	Foran 44'; Rooney 57'	Attendance: 2,017; Referee: Iain Brines

=== Scottish League Cup ===
24 August 2010 League Cup round 2	Raith Rovers	1–0	Hamilton	Stark's Park
	Mark Ferry 68'	acciesfc		Attendance: 1,674; Referee: E Smith

=== Scottish Cup ===
8 January 2011 Scottish Cup round 4	Hamilton	2–0	Alloa	New Douglas Park
	Hasselbaink 34'; F Paixao 90'	acciesfc	Robertson (red card)	Attendance: 1,054; Referee: A Muir

5 February 2011 League Cup round 2	Hamilton	1–3	Dundee United	New Douglas Park
	Antoine-Curier 46'	acciesfc	Daly 20'; Dixon 40'; Buaben 59'	Attendance: 2,577; Referee: C Thomson

== League table ==
Pos	Team	Pld	W	D	L	GF	GA	GD	Pts	Qualification or relegation
8	St Johnstone	38	11	11	16	23	43	−20	44	
9	Aberdeen	38	11	5	22	39	59	−20	38	
10	Hibernian	38	10	7	21	39	61	−22	37	
11	St Mirren	38	8	9	21	33	57	−24	33	
12	Hamilton Academical (R)	38	5	11	22	24	59	−35	26	Relegation to the First Division

Source: SPFL Archive
Rules for classification: 1) points; 2) goal difference; 3) number of goals scored.
(R) Relegated

== Players ==
Note: Flags indicate national team as defined under FIFA eligibility rules; some limited exceptions apply. Players may hold more than one non-FIFA nationality.

No.	Pos.	Nation	Player
1	GK	CZE	Tomáš Černý
3	MF	ENG	Gavin Skelton
4	DF	SCO	Martin Canning
5	DF	SCO	Andy Graham
6	DF	SCO	Mark McLaughlin
7	FW	SCO	Dougie Imrie
8	MF	SCO	Gary McDonald
9	FW	ARG	Damián Casalinuovo
10	FW	SCO	Alex Neil (captain)
11	MF	SCO	Jim McAlister
12	DF	NIR	David Buchanan
13	MF	ENG	Mark Carrington
14	MF	SCO	Kyle Wilkie
15	MF	ENG	Aaron Wildig (on loan from Cardiff City)
16	MF	IRL	James Chambers
17	MF	SCO	Ali Crawford
18	FW	POR	Flávio Paixão

No.	Pos.	Nation	Player
19	GK	SCO	Sean Murdoch
21	FW	POR	Marco Paixão
22	MF	ENG	Jon Routledge
23	DF	SCO	James Gibson
24	DF	SCO	Grant Gillespie
25	DF	IRL	David Elebert
27	MF	ENG	Simon Mensing
28	FW	SCO	David Hopkirk
29	FW	SCO	Euan Lindsay
30	FW	NED	Nigel Hasselbaink
33	DF	SCO	Lee Kilday
34	DF	SCO	Ziggy Gordon
36	FW	ENG	Tom Elliott
50	GK	SCO	Brian Potter
99	FW	GLP	Mickael Antoine-Curier

== Captains ==
No.	P	Name	Country	No. games	Notes
10	FW	Neil	(Scotland)		Club captain

Last updated: 16 May 2011
Source: Competitive match reports.
Competitive matches only
Matches started as captain only
Country: FIFA nationality; No.: Squad number; P: Position; Name: Player name; No. Games: Number of games started as captain.

=== Disciplinary records ===
No.	Pos.	Nat.	Player
1	GK	(Czech Republic)	Tomáš Černý	2	0	0
3	MF	(England)	Gavin Skelton	2	0	0
4	DF	(Scotland)	Martin Canning	6	0	2
5	DF	(Scotland)	Andy Graham	3	0	0
6	DF	(Scotland)	Mark McLaughlin	7	0	1
7	FW	(Scotland)	Dougie Imrie	14	0	0
8	MF	(Scotland)	Gary McDonald	5	0	0
9	FW	(Argentina)	Damián Casalinuovo	0	0	0
10	FW	(Scotland)	Alex Neil	4	0	1
11	MF	(Republic of Ireland)	Jim McAlister	0	0	1
12	DF	(England)	David Buchanan	0	0	0
13	MF	(England)	Mark Carrington	1	0	0
14	MF	(Scotland)	Kyle Wilkie	0	0	0
15	MF	(England)	Aaron Wildig	0	0	0
16	MF	(Republic of Ireland)	James Chambers	0	0	0
17	MF	(Scotland)	Ali Crawford	0	0	0
18	FW	(Portugal)	Flávio Paixão	4	0	0
19	GK	(Scotland)	Sean Murdoch	0	0	0
21	FW	(Portugal)	Marco Paixão	0	0	0
22	MF	(England)	Jon Routledge	1	0	0
23	DF	(Scotland)	James Gibson	0	0	0
24	DF	(Scotland)	Grant Gillespie	3	0	0
25	DF	(Republic of Ireland)	David Elebert	3	0	0
27	MF	(England)	Simon Mensing	7	0	2
28	FW	(Scotland)	David Hopkirk	0	0	0
29	MF	(Scotland)	Euan Lindsay	0	0	0
30	FW	(Netherlands)	Nigel Hasselbaink	3	0	0
33	DF	(Scotland)	Lee Kilday	0	0	0
34	DF	(Scotland)	Ziggy Gordon	5	0	0
36	FW	(England)	Tom Elliott	1	0	0
50	GK	(Scotland)	Brian Potter	0	0	0
99	FW	(Guadeloupe)	Mickael Antoine-Curier	1	0	0

Stats valid for Scottish Premier League, Scottish Cup and the Scottish League Cup. Last Updated 16 May.

=== Top scorers ===
Squad No	Pos	Player	SPL	SC	LC	Total
99	MF	(Guadeloupe) Mickael Antoine-Curier	4	1	0	5
30	MF	(Netherlands) Nigel Hasselbaink	3	1	0	4
18	FW	(Portugal) Flávio Paixão	3	1	0	4
7	FW	(Scotland) Dougie Imrie	3	0	0	3
27	MF	(England) Simon Mensing	3	0	0	3
12	DF	(Northern Ireland) David Buchanan	1	0	0	1
6	DF	(Scotland) Mark McLaughlin	1	0	0	1
16	MF	(Republic of Ireland) James Chambers	1	0	0	1
21	FW	(Portugal) Marco Paixão	1	0	0	1
22	MF	(England) Jon Routledge	1	0	0	1

Stats valid for Scottish Premier League, Scottish Cup and the Scottish League Cup. Last Updated 16 May.
