= Kyle Wilkie =

Scottish footballer

Personal information
- Date of birth: 20 February 1991 (age 35)
- Place of birth: Glasgow, Scotland
- Position: Midfielder

Team information
- Current team: Gala Fairydean Rovers

Youth career
- Stockport County

Senior career*
Years	Team	Apps	(Gls)
2009–2012	Hamilton Academical	19	(0)
2012–2013	Greenock Morton	22	(3)
2013–2014	Livingston	20	(0)
2014–2015	Nairn County	24	(1)
2015	→ Berwick Rangers (loan)	9	(2)
2015–2018	East Fife	79	(14)
2018–2019	Airdrieonians	26	(5)
2019–2020	Annan Athletic	23	(2)
2020–2021	East Kilbride		
2022–	Gala Fairydean Rovers		
- * Club domestic league appearances and goals as of 00:25, 9 July 2020 (UTC)

Kyle Wilkie (born 20 February 1991) is a Scottish professional footballer who plays as a midfielder for Gala Fairydean Rovers.

He has previously played youth football in England with Stockport County, before playing senior professional football in Scotland for Hamilton Academical, Greenock Morton, Livingston, Berwick Rangers, East Fife, Airdrieonians and Annan Athletic.

== Career ==
Wilkie graduated from the Stockport County Centre of Excellence, before signing for Hamilton Academical on 19 August 2009. He made his professional debut for Hamilton on 22 August 2009, in a 3–0 loss against Aberdeen. Wilkie left Hamilton at the end of the 2011–12 season.

After the expiry of his contract with Accies, Wilkie joined Greenock Morton on trial. He scored in a reserve match against Port Glasgow Juniors and was expected to sign on 30 July 2012. He signed a one-year contract later that week after impressing in his trial period. Wilkie was released in May 2013.

Wilkie signed a one-year contract with Livingston on 26 July 2013 after a successful trial period with the club. He made his competitive debut for Livingston on 27 July 2013, as a second-half substitute in a Scottish Challenge Cup match against Berwick Rangers. He was released in May 2014.

In August 2014, Wilkie signed for Highland League club Nairn County. He moved on loan to Berwick Rangers in March 2015, until the end of the 2014–15 season.

Wilkie then signed with East Fife for the 2015–16 season. During his first season at the club he won the Scottish League Two Player of the Month award for March 2016 and at the end of the season he was voted into the PFA Scotland League Two Team of the Year.

On 3 July 2018, Wilkie signed for Airdrieonians. After one season at Airdrieonians, Wilkie signed for Scottish League Two club Annan Athletic.

On 9 July 2020, Wilkie was announced as a new signing for East Kilbride.

Wilkie signed for Gala Fairydean Rovers in 2022.

== Personal life ==
Wilkie's family relocated to north-west England from Scotland in 2002 when elder brother Ryan signed for Liverpool; Ryan's career did not fulfil early promise due to injury and he later became a physiotherapist. Their father Dougie Wilkie played for Queen's Park and had just joined Dundee United when he was left paralysed in the 1979 Invergowrie rail accident, and became a coach and scout. The family members formed their own 'W Academy' for children, based at historic cricket ground Shawholm from 2023.

== Career statistics ==
As of match played 13 August 2019

Appearances and goals by club, season and competition
Club	Season	League			Scottish Cup		League Cup		Other		Total	
Club	Season	Division	Apps	Goals	Apps	Goals	Apps	Goals	Apps	Goals	Apps	Goals
Hamilton Academical	2009–10	Scottish Premier League	12	0	1	0	0	0	0	0	13	0
Hamilton Academical	2010–11	Scottish Premier League	6	0	0	0	0	0	0	0	6	0
Hamilton Academical	2011–12	Scottish First Division	1	0	0	0	1	0	0	0	2	0
Hamilton Academical	Total		19	0	1	0	1	0	0	0	21	0
Greenock Morton	2012–13	Scottish First Division	22	3	4	0	0	0	1 (Note: Appearances in the Scottish Challenge Cup)	0	27	3
Livingston	2013–14	Scottish Championship	20	0	0	0	2	1	1	0	23	1
Nairn County	2014–15	Highland Football League	24	1	3	0	0	0	3 (Note: Appearances in the Highland League Cup)	0	30	1
Berwick Rangers (loan)	2014–15	Scottish League Two	9	2	0	0	0	0	0	0	9	2
East Fife	2015–16	Scottish League Two	36	9	2	0	2	0	1	0	41	9
East Fife	2016–17	Scottish League One	18	0	2	0	3	0	2	0	25	0
East Fife	2017–18	Scottish League One	25	5	2	0	1	0	1	0	29	5
East Fife	Total		79	14	6	0	6	0	4	0	95	14
Airdrieonians	2018–19	Scottish League One	26	5	2	2	4	0	1	0	33	7
Annan Athletic	2019–20	Scottish League Two	2	0	0	0	4	0	1	0	7	0
Career total			201	25	16	2	17	1	11	0	245	28
