= Invergowrie rail accident =

1979 railway accident in Scotland

Details
- Date: 22 October 1979
- Location: Invergowrie, Dundee
- Coordinates: 56.458°N 3.054°W
- Country: Scotland, UK
- Line: Glasgow to Aberdeen line
- Cause: Signal passed at danger

Statistics
- Trains: 2
- Deaths: 5
- Injured: 51

The Invergowrie rail accident happened in Invergowrie, Scotland, on 22 October 1979. The accident killed five people and injured 51 others.

== Accident ==
The 08:44 passenger service from Glasgow Queen Street to Dundee, despite running late and experiencing technical difficulties, left Invergowrie station without incident. The train experienced a technical fault with the brake on the leading bogie, which was binding, of the British Rail Class 25 locomotive 25083. Despite this, the driver departed Invergowrie and carried on as Dundee, the final stop, was only 3 miles away. As the train was running along Invergowrie Bay, a traction motor caught fire and the train (with five carriages) broke down and came to a stop.

Approximately 10 minutes later, the stationary train was run into at around 60 mph (100 km/h) by the seven-coach 09:35 express from Glasgow to Aberdeen hauled by a British Rail Class 47 locomotive, 47208. The impact threw the last four coaches of the Dundee train over the sea wall into the channel of the river Tay. The last two broke away completely and ended up in the Firth of Tay while the tide was out. Both passengers in the rear carriage and the driver and secondman of the Aberdeen train were killed instantly. A further passenger died later and a total of 51 people were injured. The Class 47 locomotive was subsequently scrapped due to damage.

It was reported the next day that the dead included engine drivers Robert Duncan and William Hume. Robert Duncan was 60 years old, lived in Tayport, and was a church elder, as well as a special constable. He had a 19-year-old son. His widow stated that he had worked for British Rail since he was 16. William Hume was a driver’s assistant aged 20, who resided in Fintry, Dundee and had joined British Rail in May 1979. Both Duncan and Hume were in the leading cab of the Glasgow to Aberdeen train. The other two immediate fatalities were passengers Dr James Preston, a community health officer aged 65, and Mr Kazimierz Jedrelejczyk, a Polish marine engineer. The fifth death was that of passenger Mrs May Morrison who died in hospital as a result of injuries she had sustained in the crash. Footballer Dougie Wilkie was among the seriously injured and was left paralysed from the waist down.

== Investigation ==
The signalman at Longforgan signal box stated that he put the mechanical starting signal (also known as Section Signal) correctly back to Danger behind the Dundee train. Around ten minutes later, the Aberdeen train arrived at his box and drew up to the Home signal, which was then cleared for it. The train continued to move slowly towards the Starting signal but, after a few moments, began to accelerate. It passed the Starting signal which, as far as the signalman could see, was still at Danger. He went down onto the track and saw that the arm of the Starting signal was slightly raised; about 4°. Subsequent investigations showed that it was possible for the arm to have been raised roughly 8°.

The guard of the Aberdeen train said that he had looked out of the window of the rear coach at Longforgan as the train picked up speed. He saw the starting signal giving "a poor off" (in other words, somewhere between the "on" and "off" positions), estimating that it was raised 7.4°, but assumed that it had already been put back to Danger after the locomotive had passed it and perhaps had not quite returned to the horizontal position. It is not clear if the guard could have seen the starting signal exactly as the driver would have seen it. The subsequent public inquiry found that the guard was not to blame.

Why the driver passed the signal remained a mystery. The inquiry speculated that he may have been looking back towards the signal box, or checking that the train was clear of the level crossing. As he then looked up towards the signal he might have concluded that it had moved since he had last seen it and that it had, therefore, been cleared by the signalman. From a position below the signal and fairly close to it, he may also have overestimated the angle of the arm.

Various operating staff who saw the signal before and after the accident also gave evidence that the arm was not properly horizontal, including some who said that the degree of elevation appeared to increase as they got closer to it. It was later found that the signal post bracket was badly bent. The bracket may have been struck by a chain hanging from a wagon, or perhaps by engineers' machinery working on the lineside.

In addition, the signalling at Longforgan was basic and lacking in many safety features. The Starting signal had no AWS that would have warned the driver of the Aberdeen train, nor was there an adjuster for the pull wire. There was also no repeater in the signal box, nor was a detonator placer provided.
