= Blair Currie =

Scottish footballer

Personal information
- Date of birth: 19 February 1994 (age 32)
- Place of birth: Glasgow, Scotland
- Height: 1.85 m (6 ft 1 in)
- Position: Goalkeeper

Team information
- Current team: Cumnock Juniors

Youth career
- 2001–2011: Rangers

Senior career*
| Years | Team | Apps | (Gls) |
| 2011–2013 | Rangers | 0 | (0) |
| 2012 | → Hamilton Academical (loan) | 4 | (0) |
| 2013–2015 | Hamilton Academical | 3 | (0) |
| 2015–2017 | Annan Athletic | 41 | (0) |
| 2017–2019 | Clyde | 68 | (0) |
| 2019–2024 | Stirling Albion | 122 | (0) |
| 2024– | Cumnock Juniors | | |
- * Club domestic league appearances and goals as of 11 May 2024

Blair Currie (born 19 February 1994) is a Scottish footballer who plays as a goalkeeper for Lowland League West club Cumnock Juniors.

== Early and personal life ==
Currie's brother Max is also a footballer, who plays as a goalkeeper for Airdrieonians.

== Career ==
Currie began his playing career as a youth for Rangers at the age of seven. He worked his way up to the under-19 squad, where he was back up to fellow keeper Alan Smith. On the opening day of the 2012 January transfer window, Currie joined Scottish First Division side Hamilton Academical on an emergency loan until the end of the season.

Currie was an unused substitute on 14 occasions, before he made his debut as a substitute against Falkirk on 10 April 2012, following the sending off of David Hutton. At the time he was the youngest goalkeeper playing first team football in the UK. In all he made four appearances before returning to Rangers.

He was released by Hamilton at the end of the 2014–15 season. On 15 July 2015, Currie signed for Annan Athletic, agreeing a one-year contract. After two seasons with Annan, Currie left the club to join former Annan manager Jim Chapman at league rivals Clyde in June 2017.

At the end of Season 18–19, Currie opted to join Stirling Albion.

== Career statistics ==
As of match played 30 October 2021

Appearances and goals by club, season and competition
| Club | Season | League | | | Scottish Cup | | League Cup | | Other | | Total | |
| Club | Season | Division | Apps | Goals | Apps | Goals | Apps | Goals | Apps | Goals | Apps | Goals |
|---|---|---|---|---|---|---|---|---|---|---|---|---|
| Rangers | 2011–12 | Scottish Premier League | 0 | 0 | 0 | 0 | 0 | 0 | 0 | 0 | 0 | 0 |
| Rangers | 2012–13 | Scottish Third Division | 0 | 0 | 0 | 0 | 0 | 0 | 0 | 0 | 0 | 0 |
| Rangers | Total | | 0 | 0 | 0 | 0 | 0 | 0 | 0 | 0 | 0 | 0 |
| Hamilton Academical (loan) | 2011–12 | Scottish First Division | 4 | 0 | 0 | 0 | 0 | 0 | 0 | 0 | 4 | 0 |
| Hamilton Academical | 2013–14 | Scottish Championship | 3 | 0 | 0 | 0 | 0 | 0 | 0 | 0 | 3 | 0 |
| Hamilton Academical | 2014–15 | Scottish Premiership | 0 | 0 | 0 | 0 | 0 | 0 | 0 | 0 | 0 | 0 |
| Hamilton Academical | Total | | 3 | 0 | 0 | 0 | 0 | 0 | 0 | 0 | 3 | 0 |
| Annan Athletic | 2015–16 | Scottish League Two | 6 | 0 | 0 | 0 | 0 | 0 | 0 | 0 | 6 | 0 |
| Annan Athletic | 2016–17 | Scottish League Two | 35 | 0 | 3 | 0 | 4 | 0 | 2 (Note: Appearances in the League One play-offs) | 0 | 44 | 0 |
| Annan Athletic | Total | | 41 | 0 | 3 | 0 | 4 | 0 | 2 | 0 | 50 | 0 |
| Clyde | 2017–18 | Scottish League Two | 32 | 0 | 2 | 0 | 4 | 0 | 1 (Note: Appearance in the Scottish Challenge Cup) | 0 | 39 | 0 |
| Clyde | 2018–19 | Scottish League Two | 36 | 0 | 1 | 0 | 3 | 0 | 4 (Note: Appearances in the League One play-offs) | 0 | 44 | 0 |
| Clyde | Total | | 68 | 0 | 3 | 0 | 7 | 0 | 5 | 0 | 83 | 0 |
| Stirling Albion | 2019–20 | Scottish League Two | 16 | 0 | 2 | 0 | 2 | 0 | 0 | 0 | 20 | 0 |
| Stirling Albion | 2020–21 | Scottish League Two | 7 | 0 | 1 | 0 | 0 | 0 | 0 | 0 | 8 | 0 |
| Stirling Albion | 2021–22 | Scottish League Two | 11 | 0 | 1 | 0 | 4 | 0 | 0 | 0 | 16 | 0 |
| Stirling Albion | Total | | 34 | 0 | 4 | 0 | 6 | 0 | 0 | 0 | 44 | 0 |
| Career total | | | 150 | 0 | 10 | 0 | 17 | 0 | 7 | 0 | 184 | 0 |
