= Dougie Wilkie =

Scottish footballer (born 1956)

Personal information
- Full name: Douglas James Wilkie
- Date of birth: 25 September 1956 (age 70)
- Place of birth: Pollok, Scotland
- Position: Left winger

Youth career
- Eastercraigs
- Fernhill Athletic
- Queen's Park

Senior career*
Years	Team	Apps	(Gls)
1975–1979	Queen's Park	106	(13)
1979	Dundee United	0	(0)
- * Club domestic league appearances and goals

Douglas James Wilkie (born 25 September 1956) is a Scottish retired football left winger who made over 100 appearances in the Scottish League for Queen's Park.

His career was ended abruptly just after he joined Dundee United in 1979 when he was left paralysed from the waist from injury in the Invergowrie rail accident. He became a coach and scout, and founded a youth training academy with sons Ryan and Kyle, both of whom also became footballers.
