= Simon Mensing =

German footballer (born 1982)

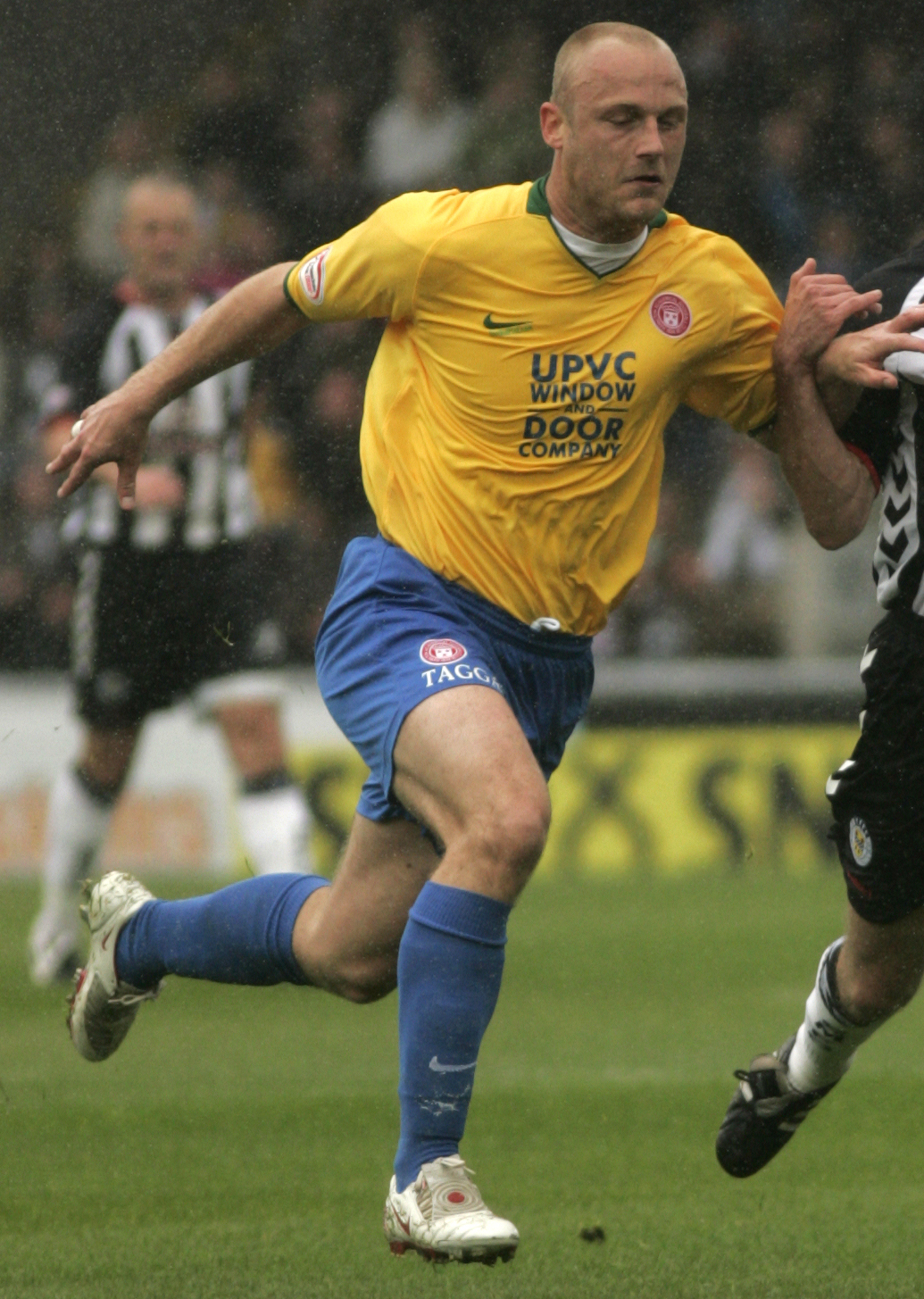

Personal information
- Full name: Simon Ross Mensing
- Date of birth: 27 June 1982 (age 44)
- Place of birth: Wolfenbüttel, West Germany
- Position: Centre back

Youth career
- Kingstonian
- Acton Ealing Whistlers

Senior career*
Years	Team	Apps	(Gls)
2000–2002	Wimbledon	0	(0)
2001	→ Stenhousemuir (loan)	15	(1)
2001–2002	→ Clyde (loan)	23	(1)
2002–2005	Clyde	96	(4)
2005–2007	St Johnstone	62	(7)
2007–2008	Motherwell	2	(0)
2007–2008	→ Hamilton Academical (loan)	5	(3)
2008–2012	Hamilton Academical	148	(24)
2012	Greenock Morton (trial)	1	(0)
2012–2013	Raith Rovers	32	(2)
2013–2015	Livingston	33	(2)
2015	Atlanta Silverbacks	28	(0)
2016–2017	Carolina RailHawks	19	(0)
2017	Airdrieonians	15	(0)
2017–2018	Forfar Athletic	7	(0)
- * Club domestic league appearances and goals as of 17:23, 15 October 2017 (UTC)

Simon Ross Mensing (born 27 June 1982) is a German former professional footballer who played as a centre back.

During his career Mensing has played for 10 different clubs, including spells with Wimbledon in England; Stenhousemuir, Clyde, St Johnstone, Motherwell, Hamilton Academical, Greenock Morton, Raith Rovers, Livingston and Airdrieonians in Scotland; and Atlanta Silverbacks and Carolina RailHawks in America.

== Club career ==
=== Clyde ===
In 2001, Mensing joined Clyde on loan from Wimbledon. He quickly became a regular in his right back role, and won the Young Player of the Year award in his first season. He joined Clyde permanently in May 2002. Mensing became a huge fans favourite, with his aggressive style of play and was given the nickname "Gunter" due to his German roots. His versatility was also an important feature of his game, playing in every defensive role, as well as midfield on several occasions, and occasionally as a striker.

=== St Johnstone ===
Mensing scored the only goal of the game in St Johnstone's win at Queen of the South in the second league game of the 2006–07 season. On 28 February 2007, Mensing was named as the BBC's Man of the Match in St Johnstone's televised 2–1 Scottish Cup win at Motherwell, a result which took the Perth club into their second cup semi-final of the season.

=== Hamilton Academical ===
Mensing moved from Motherwell to local rivals Hamilton Academical on a three-month loan deal in September 2007, after finding it difficult to progress beyond being a squad player. After extending the deal for an additional month Hamilton then signed Mensing permanently on 18 January 2008. He won promotion to the Scottish Premier League with the Accies in 2007–08 as Division One champions. Mensing was banned for a month in 2011 for testing for a banned substance methylhexanamine. The positive urine test was taken after the game against Aberdeen on 29 December. He missed five games for Hamilton in total. Mensing revealed that the substance was in a dietary supplement he had been taking purchased of the high street and he had taken advice before taking and believed there to be no banned substances in it. Hamilton and Mensing only revealed details of the ban after it had been served. He was banned between 29 January and 28 February 2011. Despite the ban, Mensing maintained his innocent for testing for a banned substance methylhexanamine. Mensing left Hamilton after season 2011–12 after spending five years at the club.

=== Raith Rovers ===
After being released by Hamilton Academical, Mensing went on trial with Morton for most of the summer 2012 pre-season, and played as a trialist in a 1–1 draw with his former club Hamilton. On 14 September 2012, Mensing signed for Raith Rovers on a one-year contract despite Hamilton offering him a new contract. On his debut against Airdrie United, he got the man of the match award and his performance was praised by manager Grant Murray. Mensing scored his first goal for Raith Rovers in a 4–4 draw with Fife neighbours Cowdenbeath.

=== Livingston ===
On 22 May 2013, Mensing signed for Livingston on a two-year contract. He was named captain of his new club on 10 July 2013, and scored a penalty on his competitive debut on 3 August 2013 in a Scottish Challenge Cup match against Berwick Rangers. Following a serious knee injury Mensing failed to hold down a regular place in the Livingston team, and was released from his contract by mutual consent on 30 January 2015.

=== USA Soccer ===
On 27 January 2015, Coach Gary Smith bolstered the Atlanta backline with the signings of Mensing and fellow Englishman Paul Black. However he left the club in January 2016 due to the side folding after failing to find local ownership. Returning to Scotland, Mensing trained with Scottish League One side Dunfermline Athletic with a view to signing for the Pars who were suffering an injury crisis, with four defenders out through injury.

However, Mensing opted to stay in America and signed with Carolina RailHawks of the North American Soccer League on 22 January 2016.

=== Return to Scotland ===
After leaving Carolina RailHawks, Mensing signed for Scottish League One club Airdrieonians on 27 January 2017, in a deal until the end of the 2016–17 season. After 17 appearances for the club, Mensing was released in May 2017, signing for fellow League One club Forfar Athletic shortly after.

== Coaching career ==
Mensing began his coaching career as a youth coach at Partick Thistle in January 2019.

== Career statistics ==
As of match played 28 October 2017

Appearances and goals by club, season and competition
Club	Season	League			Scottish Cup		League Cup		Other		Total	
Club	Season	Division	Apps	Goals	Apps	Goals	Apps	Goals	Apps	Goals	Apps	Goals
Stenhousemuir (loan)	2000–01	Second Division	15	1	0	0	0	0	0	0	15	1
Clyde (loan)	2001–02	First Division	23	1	2	1	0	0	0	0	25	2
Clyde	2002–03	First Division	35	4	1	0	1	0	1 (Note: Appearances in the Scottish Challenge Cup)	0	38	4
Clyde	2003–04	First Division	31	0	2	0	2	0	2	0	37	0
Clyde	2004–05	First Division	30	0	4	0	2	0	2	0	38	0
Clyde	Clyde total		96	4	7	0	5	0	5	0	113	4
St Johnstone	2005–06	First Division	29	3	0	0	2	0	1	1	32	4
St Johnstone	2006–07	First Division	33	4	5	0	5	1	3	0	46	5
St Johnstone	St Johnstone total		62	7	5	0	7	1	4	1	78	9
Motherwell	2007–08	Premier League	2	0	0	0	2	0	0	0	4	0
Hamilton Academical (loan)	2007–08	First Division	17	5	1	0	0	0	0	0	18	5
Hamilton Academical	2008–09	Premier League	33	6	2	0	2	0	~	~	37	6
Hamilton Academical	2009–10	Premier League	37	8	2	1	1	1	~	~	40	10
Hamilton Academical	2010–11	Premier League	30	3	1	0	1	0	~	~	32	3
Hamilton Academical	2011–12	First Division	34	2	2	0	1	0	3	0	40	2
Hamilton Academical	Hamilton total		134	19	7	1	5	1	3	0	149	21
Greenock Morton (trial)	2012–13	First Division	1	0	0	0	0	0	0	0	1	0
Raith Rovers	2012–13	First Division	27	1	2	0	1	0	0	0	30	1
Livingston	2013–14	Championship	27	2	1	0	3	0	1	1	32	3
Livingston	2014–15	Championship	6	0	1	0	0	0	0	0	7	0
Livingston	Livingston total		33	2	2	0	3	0	1	1	39	3
Atlanta Silverbacks	2015	NASL	28	0	2	0	0	0	0	0	30	0
Carolina RailHawks	2016	NASL	19	0	2	0	0	0	0	0	21	0
Airdrieonians	2016–17	League One	15	0	0	0	0	0	2 (Note: Appearances in the Championship play-offs)	0	17	0
Forfar Athletic	2017–18	League One	7	0	0	0	4	0	0	0	11	0
Career total			479	40	30	2	27	2	15	2	551	46

== Honours ==
Clyde

- Scottish First Division: (Runners-up) (2): 2002–03, 2003–04

Hamilton Academical

- Scottish First Division: 2007–08
- Scottish Challenge Cup: (Runners-up): 2011–12
