= Tom Elliott (footballer, born 1990) =

English footballer (born 1990)

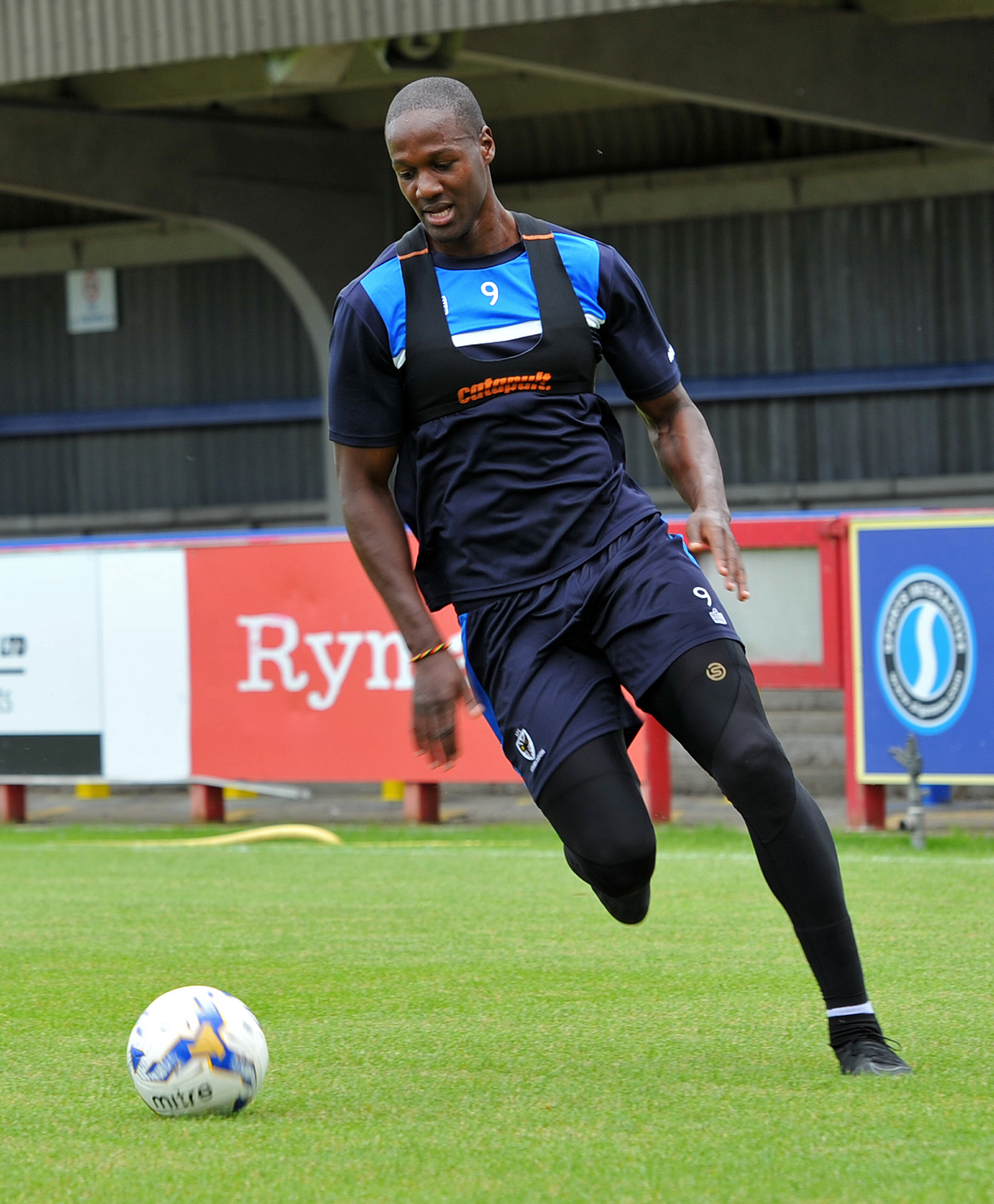
- Elliott in training with AFC Wimbledon in 2015

Personal information
- Full name: Thomas Joshua Elliott
- Date of birth: 9 November 1990 (age 36)
- Place of birth: Leeds, England
- Height: 6 ft 3 in (1.90 m)
- Position: Striker

Youth career
- 2006–2007: Leeds United

Senior career*
Years	Team	Apps	(Gls)
2007–2011	Leeds United	3	(0)
2009	→ Macclesfield Town (loan)	6	(0)
2009–2010	→ Bury (loan)	16	(1)
2010	→ Rotherham United (loan)	6	(0)
2011	Hamilton Academical	7	(0)
2011–2012	Stockport County	42	(7)
2012–2015	Cambridge United	76	(26)
2015–2017	AFC Wimbledon	81	(15)
2017–2020	Millwall	57	(7)
2020–2022	Salford City	41	(5)
2022	→ Bradford City (loan)	7	(0)
Total		342	(61)

International career
2006	England U16	1	(0)
2008	England U18	1	(0)
- * Club domestic league appearances and goals

Thomas Joshua Elliott (born 9 November 1990) is an English former footballer who played as a striker.

A former England youth international, he graduated from the Leeds United Youth Team to win a professional contract in 2007. He spent four years with the club but made just four first team appearances, and had loan spells at Macclesfield Town, Bury, and Rotherham United. He joined Scottish Premier League club Hamilton Academical in January 2011, before moving on to Stockport County eight months later. He joined Cambridge United in May 2012, and helped the club win promotion back into the Football League after winning the 2014 Conference Premier play-off final.

He joined AFC Wimbledon in 2015, winning promotion to League One via the play-offs in 2016 before being named Wimbledon's Player of the Year for the following year. After his contract expiry at Wimbledon in 2017, he joined Millwall before signing for Salford City in January 2020. After two years at the club and a loan spell at Bradford City, he was released in summer 2022.

== Club career ==
=== Leeds United ===
Born in Leeds, Elliott began his career at hometown club Leeds United, and manager Dennis Wise handed him his first team debut aged 16, coming on for Kevin Nicholls 81 minutes into a 2–1 defeat to Norwich City at Carrow Road on 3 February 2007. This made him the first schoolboy to appear for the Leeds first team, though not the youngest as Peter Lorimer played for United as a 15 year old in 1962. By the end of the 2006–07 season he had played in three Championship games for the "Whites". He signed a professional contract in August 2007, which would come into effect the following summer. He featured in one League Cup game in the 2007–08 season, which would be his last appearance for Leeds.

==== Macclesfield Town (loan) ====
He joined League Two side Macclesfield Town on a one-month loan on 27 January 2009, with manager Keith Alexander saying that "Much like Emile Sinclair he is an exciting prospect and gives us more attacking option". He made six appearances for the "Silkmen" during his time at Moss Rose.

==== Bury (loan) ====
He was loaned out to League Two club Bury on a three-month loan in September 2009. He scored his first professional goal on 29 September, in a 3–2 win over Crewe Alexandra at Gresty Road. After the match manager Alan Knill tipped him for a big future at Gigg Lane, however this would be his only goal for the "Shakers" in 17 appearances.

==== Rotherham United (loan) ====
He joined League Two club Rotherham United on a six-month loan deal in July 2010 as manager Ronnie Moore needed replacements for injured strikers Tom Pope and Ryan Taylor. He featured seven times for the "Millers" without scoring a goal. He struggled with hamstring problems and came in for some harsh criticism from Moore, who nicknamed him 'sicknote' and said he "is always injured and he will not play with any bit of pain so he has to grow up".

=== Hamilton Academical ===
Elliott signed a short-term deal with Scottish Premier League side Hamilton Academical in January 2011. Manager Billy Reid hoped Elliott would provide the goals to keep the "Accies" in the SPL, however he failed to hit the net and made only one start and six substitute appearances during his time at New Douglas Park. He was released in May 2011 following the club's relegation into the First Division.

=== Stockport County ===
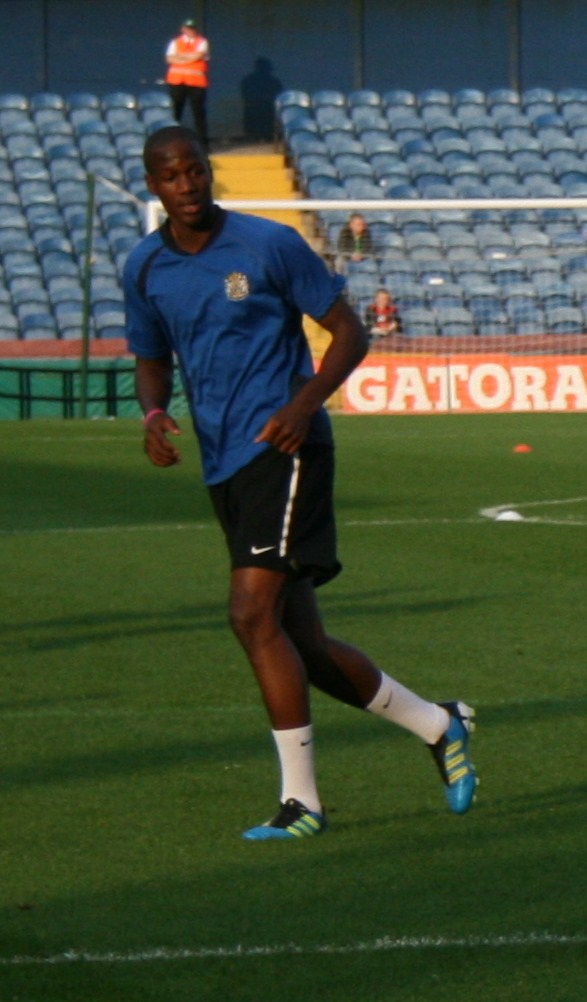
Elliott warming up for Stockport County in 2011.

Elliott went on trial with Bradford City, who offered him a contract in June 2011. However he did not sign the contract, and instead joined Dietmar Hamann's Stockport County, along with Hamilton teammate Jon Routledge, in August 2011. He had a poor start to his time at Edgeley Park but began to settle in at the club after manager Jim Gannon changed formation to improve service to him. Elliott was joint-leading goalscorer for County for the 2011–12 season, with eight goals in all competitions, and chose to leave the club in the summer after rejecting the offer of a new contract.

=== Cambridge United ===
Elliott was signed in May 2012 by then United manager, Jez George, on a two-year contract. On 4 December, he scored a hat-trick in a 4–2 win over Ebbsfleet United at Stonebridge Road. He ended the 2012–13 campaign with 16 goals in 33 games. He struggled with injury and featured in only 14 Conference Premier games in the 2013–14 season. He did though play the first 77 minutes of the play-off final victory over Gateshead at Wembley Stadium, before being taken off for Adam Cunnington. On 3 February 2015, he hit the post against Manchester United in a 3–0 FA Cup defeat at Old Trafford. He finished the 2014–15 season with eight goals in 34 appearances but was one of 12 players not offered a new deal when his contract expired.

=== AFC Wimbledon ===
Elliott joined AFC Wimbledon on 2 July following his release from Cambridge; the length of this deal was not announced. He got his first league goal for Wimbledon against his former club Cambridge, despite them going on to lose 2–1. He played a part in getting Wimbledon promoted to League 1 on Monday 30 May 2016, where he started in Wimbledon's 2–0 win over Plymouth in the Play-Off Final.

In the 2016–17 season, Elliott was named AFC Wimbledon player of the season, scoring 10 goals in all competitions. He was the club's joint top scorer, along with other striker Lyle Taylor.

When his contract ran out, recently promoted Millwall of the Championship agreed terms with Elliott on a free transfer.

=== Millwall ===
Elliott agreed a deal with Millwall on 30 May following his contract expiry from AFC Wimbledon; the length of this deal was 2 years. He scored his first goals for Millwall when he scored twice in a 2-0 EFL Cup win against Stevenage on 8 August 2017.

=== Salford City ===
After his Millwall contract expired, Elliott signed a 2 1/2-year deal with Salford City on 9 January 2020. On his debut for Salford he scored the winning goal in an EFL Trophy tie against Accrington Stanley on 21 January. His first league goal came on 1 February against Port Vale, scoring a header to equalise for Salford in a 1–1 draw.

==== Bradford City (loan) ====
On 27 January 2022, Elliott joined League Two rivals Bradford City on loan until the end of the 2021–22 season. He had trialled with the club, unsuccessfully, in 2011.

He was released by Salford at the end of the 2021–22 season.

== International career ==
Elliott made his debut for the England under-16 team against Tunisia on 15 April 2006. He made his debut for the England under-18 team against Austria on 16 April 2008.

== Style of play ==
Tom Elliott is known to have favored his right foot. He scored highly on assists compared to forwards in his league.

== Career statistics ==
As of end of 2021–22 season

Appearances and goals by club, season and competition
Club	Season	League			National Cup		League Cup		Other		Total	
Club	Season	Division	Apps	Goals	Apps	Goals	Apps	Goals	Apps	Goals	Apps	Goals
Leeds United	2006–07	Championship	3	0	0	0	0	0	—		3	0
Leeds United	2007–08	League One	0	0	0	0	1	0	0	0	1	0
Leeds United	2008–09	League One	0	0	0	0	0	0	0	0	0	0
Leeds United	2009–10	League One	0	0	0	0	0	0	0	0	0	0
Leeds United	2010–11	Championship	0	0	0	0	0	0	—		0	0
Leeds United	Total		3	0	0	0	1	0	0	0	4	0
Macclesfield Town (loan)	2008–09	League Two	6	0	0	0	0	0	0	0	6	0
Bury (loan)	2009–10	League Two	16	1	0	0	0	0	1 (Note: Appearance(s) in the Football League Trophy)	0	17	1
Rotherham United (loan)	2010–11	League Two	6	0	0	0	0	0	1	0	7	0
Hamilton Academical	2010–11	Scottish Premier League	7	0	0	0	0	0	0	0	7	0
Stockport County	2011–12	Conference Premier	42	7	0	0	—		2 (Note: Appearance(s) in FA Trophy)	1	44	8
Cambridge United	2012–13	Conference Premier	32	15	1	0	—		1	1	34	16
Cambridge United	2013–14	Conference Premier	14	3	0	0	—		5 (Note: Two appearances and one goal in FA Trophy, three appearances in Conference Premier play-offs)	1	19	4
Cambridge United	2014–15	League Two	30	8	4	0	0	0	0	0	34	8
Cambridge United	Total		76	26	5	0	0	0	6	2	87	28
AFC Wimbledon	2015–16	League Two	42	6	1	0	1	0	3 (Note: Appearances in the League Two play-offs)	0	47	6
AFC Wimbledon	2016–17	League One	39	9	4	4	1	0	2	0	46	13
AFC Wimbledon	Total		81	15	5	4	2	0	5	0	93	19
Millwall	2017–18	Championship	24	4	2	0	2	2	—		28	6
Millwall	2018–19	Championship	33	3	2	0	3	0	—		38	3
Millwall	2019–20	Championship	0	0	0	0	1	0	—		1	0
Millwall	Total		57	7	4	0	6	2	0	0	67	9
Salford City	2019–20	League Two	8	1	0	0	0	0	2	1	10	2
Salford City	2020–21	League Two	14	0	0	0	2	0	3	0	19	0
Salford City	2021–22	League Two	19	4	1	0	1	0	0	0	21	4
Salford City	Total		41	5	1	0	3	0	5	1	50	6
Bradford City (loan)	2021–22	League Two	7	0	0	0	0	0	0	0	7	0
Career total			342	61	15	4	12	2	20	4	389	71

== Honours ==
Cambridge United

- Conference Premier play-offs: 2014

AFC Wimbledon

- Football League Two play-offs: 2016

Individual

- AFC Wimbledon Player of the Year: 2016–17
