= Invergowrie Bay =

Tidal basin in Perth and Kinross, Scotland

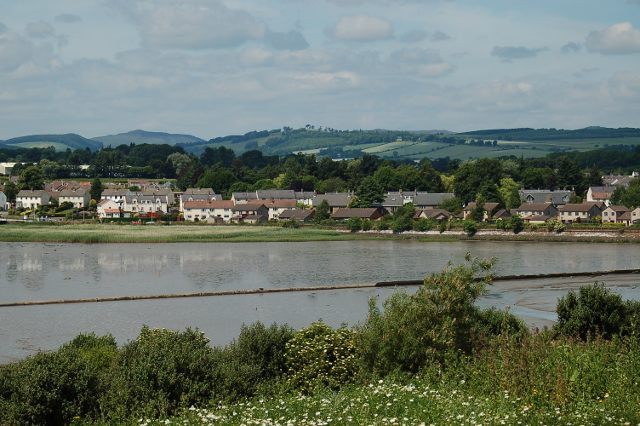
- The bay near low tide

- Location within Perth and Kinross
- Location: Firth of Tay
- Coordinates: 56.45°N 3.06°W
- River sources: River Tay
- Basin countries: United Kingdom
- Settlements: Dundee, Invergowrie

Invergowrie Bay is a tidal basin located near Invergowrie in eastern Scotland. Also in the bay are the Gowrie Burn and the Huntly Burn. There is a 1.25 mi (2.01 km) walk along the shoreline from Invergowrie railway station to Kingoodie.
