= Tomáš Černý =

Czech footballer

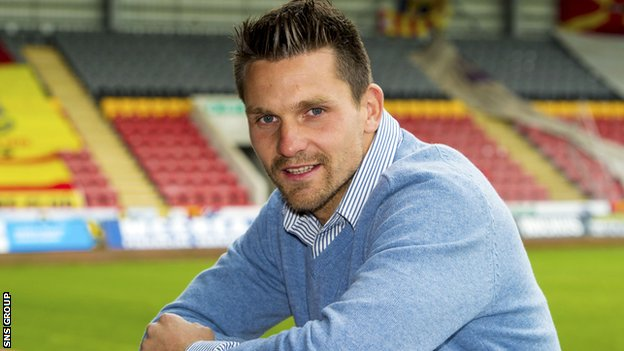

Personal information
- Full name: Tomáš Černy
- Date of birth: 10 April 1985 (age 41)
- Place of birth: Ústí nad Labem, Czechoslovakia
- Height: 6 ft 1 in (1.85 m)
- Position: Goalkeeper

Senior career*
| Years | Team | Apps | (Gls) |
| 2002–2009 | Sigma Olomouc | 1 | (0) |
| 2007–2009 | → Hamilton Academical (loan) | 51 | (0) |
| 2009–2012 | Hamilton Academical | 82 | (0) |
| 2012–2014 | CSKA Sofia | 49 | (0) |
| 2014–2015 | Ergotelis | 11 | (0) |
| 2015 | Hibernian | 0 | (0) |
| 2015–2018 | Partick Thistle | 89 | (0) |
| 2018–2021 | Aberdeen | 2 | (0) |
| Total | | 285 | (0) |

International career
| 2001–2002 | Czech Republic U17 | 6 | (0) |
| 2002–2003 | Czech Republic U18 | 5 | (0) |
| 2003–2004 | Czech Republic U19 | 12 | (1) |
| 2004–2006 | Czech Republic U21 | 5 | (0) |
- * Club domestic league appearances and goals

Tomáš Černý (born 10 April 1985) is a Czech retired professional footballer who played as a goalkeeper. Černý has played football in the Czech Republic, Scotland, Bulgaria and Greece for Sigma Olomouc, Hamilton Academical, CSKA Sofia, Ergotelis, Hibernian, Partick Thistle and Aberdeen respectively. He has also played youth international football for the Czech Republic.

== Club career ==
=== Sigma Olomouc ===
Born in Ústí nad Labem, Černý started his career at Sigma Olomouc in 2002, was outstanding player in the youth set-up, but he made only one senior appearance for the club, playing in a 0–0 draw against Příbram on 12 March 2005.

=== Hamilton Academical ===
He signed on loan for Scottish First Division side Hamilton Academical in August 2007. Černý helped Hamilton achieve promotion to the Scottish Premier League in 2008. Černý won the SPL Player of the Month Award in January 2009. In March 2009, Černý announced his desire to stay with the Accies after his loan spell ended. On 24 April 2009, Černý signed a two-year permanent contract with Hamilton and completed a transfer from Sigma Olomouc for a fee of 200.000 Euro after attracting interest from Glasgow Celtic and Glasgow Rangers. Tomas played 155 official games for the club. Tomas was recognised as Hamilton Academical's Player of the Year for 2008–2009. On 17 February 2012, Černý's contract was terminated by mutual consent.

=== CSKA Sofia ===
On 26 June 2012, Černý joined Bulgarian club CSKA Sofia. He made his competitive debut in a 0–0 draw against Mura 05 in the second qualifying round of Europa League on 19 July. His A Group debut came on 11 August, in the 1–0 away loss against Litex Lovech. Černý was the undisputed number one goalkeeper for a period of more than a year and during that time racked up an impressive tally of 32 clean sheets in 57 official games. However, in late 2013, Černý lost his place in the starting line-up due to refusing to extend his contract with the club over lack of payment.

=== Ergotelis ===
On 6 July 2014, Černý signed a two-year contract with Greek Super League club Ergotelis.

=== Hibernian ===
On 26 January 2015, Černý moved to Hibernian, signing a contract until the end of the 2014–15. He left the club at the end of his contract.

=== Partick Thistle ===
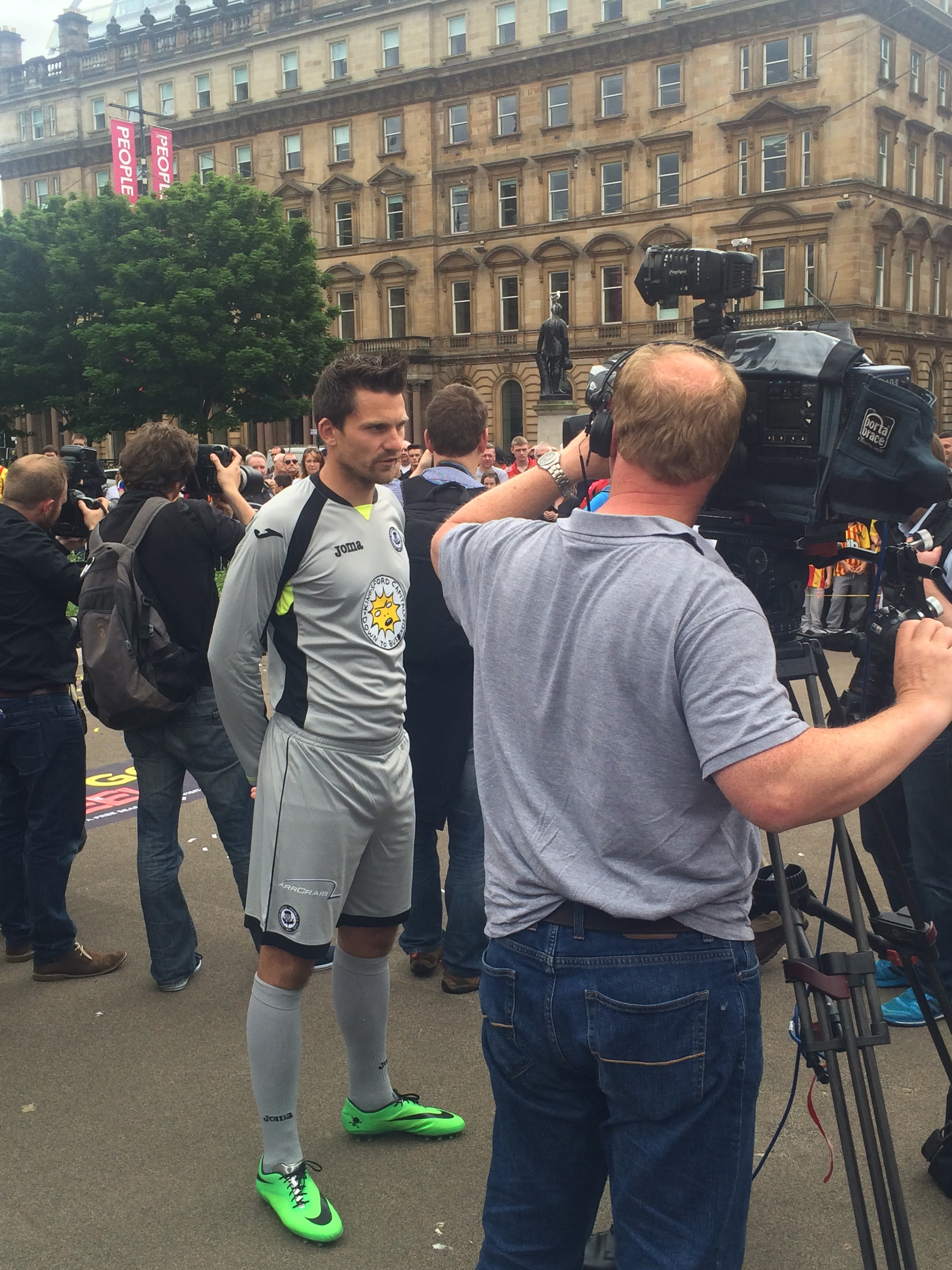
Cerny at a Partick Thistle media event in Glasgow

Černý signed a one-year contract with Scottish Premiership club Partick Thistle in June 2015. He played regularly for Thistle in the early part of the 2015–16 season, and manager Alan Archibald said he was the team's best player during this period. Černý suffered an ankle injury in October. On 22 January 2016, Černý signed a contract extension keeping him at Firhill Stadium until the summer of 2018.

On 8 May 2016, the day after Thistle secured their top flight status with a 2–0 away win to Kilmarnock, Černy was voted Partick Thistle's player of the year at a ceremony in the Crowne Plaza in Glasgow.

In July 2017, he extended his contract with Thistle to the summer of 2019. After Thistle were relegated from the Premiership in May 2018, Černy exercised a clause in his contract that allowed him to become a free agent.

=== Aberdeen ===
Černy signed a one-year contract with Aberdeen in July 2018. He extended his stay for another year in May 2019. He again signed a new one-year deal in July 2020. On 14 January 2021, Černy departed Aberdeen, also confirming his retirement from professional football. He confirmed that he would be training as a physical education teacher, looking to work in the northeast of Scotland, having settled in the area with his family.

== International career ==
Černý was a member of the Czech under-17, under-18, under-19 and under-21 teams, being capped 23 times U17-U19 and 5 times U21 at national level. During his international career, Černý played alongside the likes of Michal Kadlec and Tomáš Sivok. Černý was part of the U-19 Czech Republic team that won Bronze at the European Championships in 2003. During this tournament, Černý kept a clean sheet against England in a 3:0 win.

== Personal life ==
Černý married his Scottish wife Laura in June 2013, after meeting her during his time playing for Hamilton Accies.

When Černý moved to Scotland in 2007, he spoke little English and after a year of learning the language, enrolled in a Psychology degree with the Open University. Černý also became involved in the Scottish reading stars initiative in 2014.

== Career statistics ==
As of 14 January 2021

Appearances by club, season and competition
| Club | Season | League | | | National Cup | | League Cup | | Other | | Total | |
| Club | Season | Division | Apps | Goals | Apps | Goals | Apps | Goals | Apps | Goals | Apps | Goals |
|---|---|---|---|---|---|---|---|---|---|---|---|---|
| Sigma Olomouc | 2004–05 | Czech First League | 1 | 0 | 0 | 0 | — | | 0 | 0 | 1 | 0 |
| Hamilton Academical | 2007–08 | Scottish First Division | 15 | 0 | 2 | 0 | 1 | 0 | 0 | 0 | 18 | 0 |
| Hamilton Academical | 2008–09 | Scottish Premier League | 36 | 0 | 3 | 0 | 2 | 0 | — | | 41 | 0 |
| Hamilton Academical | 2009–10 | Scottish Premier League | 34 | 0 | 2 | 0 | 1 | 0 | — | | 37 | 0 |
| Hamilton Academical | 2010–11 | Scottish Premier League | 37 | 0 | 2 | 0 | 1 | 0 | — | | 40 | 0 |
| Hamilton Academical | 2011–12 | Scottish First Division | 11 | 0 | 1 | 0 | 1 | 0 | 4 (Note: Appearances in the Scottish Challenge Cup) | 0 | 17 | 0 |
| Hamilton Academical | Total | | 133 | 0 | 10 | 0 | 6 | 0 | 4 | 0 | 153 | 0 |
| CSKA Sofia | 2012–13 | Bulgarian First League | 29 | 0 | 4 | 0 | — | | 2 (Note: Appearances in the Europa League) | 0 | 35 | 0 |
| CSKA Sofia | 2013–14 | Bulgarian First League | 20 | 0 | 1 | 0 | — | | — | | 21 | 0 |
| CSKA Sofia | Total | | 49 | 0 | 5 | 0 | — | | 2 | 0 | 56 | 0 |
| Ergotelis | 2014–15 | Super League Greece | 11 | 0 | 0 | 0 | — | | — | | 11 | 0 |
| Hibernian | 2014–15 | Scottish Championship | 0 | 0 | 0 | 0 | 0 | 0 | 0 | 0 | 0 | 0 |
| Partick Thistle | 2015–16 | Scottish Premiership | 28 | 0 | 2 | 0 | 1 | 0 | — | | 31 | 0 |
| Partick Thistle | 2016–17 | Scottish Premiership | 27 | 0 | 3 | 0 | 1 | 0 | — | | 31 | 0 |
| Partick Thistle | 2017–18 | Scottish Premiership | 34 | 0 | 2 | 0 | 5 | 0 | 2 (Note: Appearances in the Scottish Premiership play-offs) | 0 | 43 | 0 |
| Partick Thistle | Total | | 89 | 0 | 7 | 0 | 7 | 0 | 2 | 0 | 105 | 0 |
| Aberdeen | 2018–19 | Scottish Premiership | 2 | 0 | 0 | 0 | 0 | 0 | 0 | 0 | 2 | 0 |
| Aberdeen | 2019–20 | Scottish Premiership | 0 | 0 | 0 | 0 | 0 | 0 | 0 | 0 | 0 | 0 |
| Aberdeen | 2020–21 | Scottish Premiership | 0 | 0 | 0 | 0 | 0 | 0 | 0 | 0 | 0 | 0 |
| Aberdeen | Total | | 2 | 0 | 0 | 0 | 0 | 0 | 0 | 0 | 2 | 0 |
| Career total | | | 285 | 0 | 20 | 0 | 13 | 0 | 8 | 0 | 326 | 0 |

== Honours ==
=== Individual ===
- Scottish Premier League Player of the Month – January 2009
- Partick Thistle Player of The Year – 2016
- Hamilton Academical Player of the Year – 2009

=== Team ===
- European Championships U19 Bronze Medal
- Scottish Championship Winner 2008
