= Invergowrie =

Village in Scotland

Coordinates: 56.460303°N 3.061237°W

Invergowrie: Scottish Gaelic: Inbhir Ghobharaidh
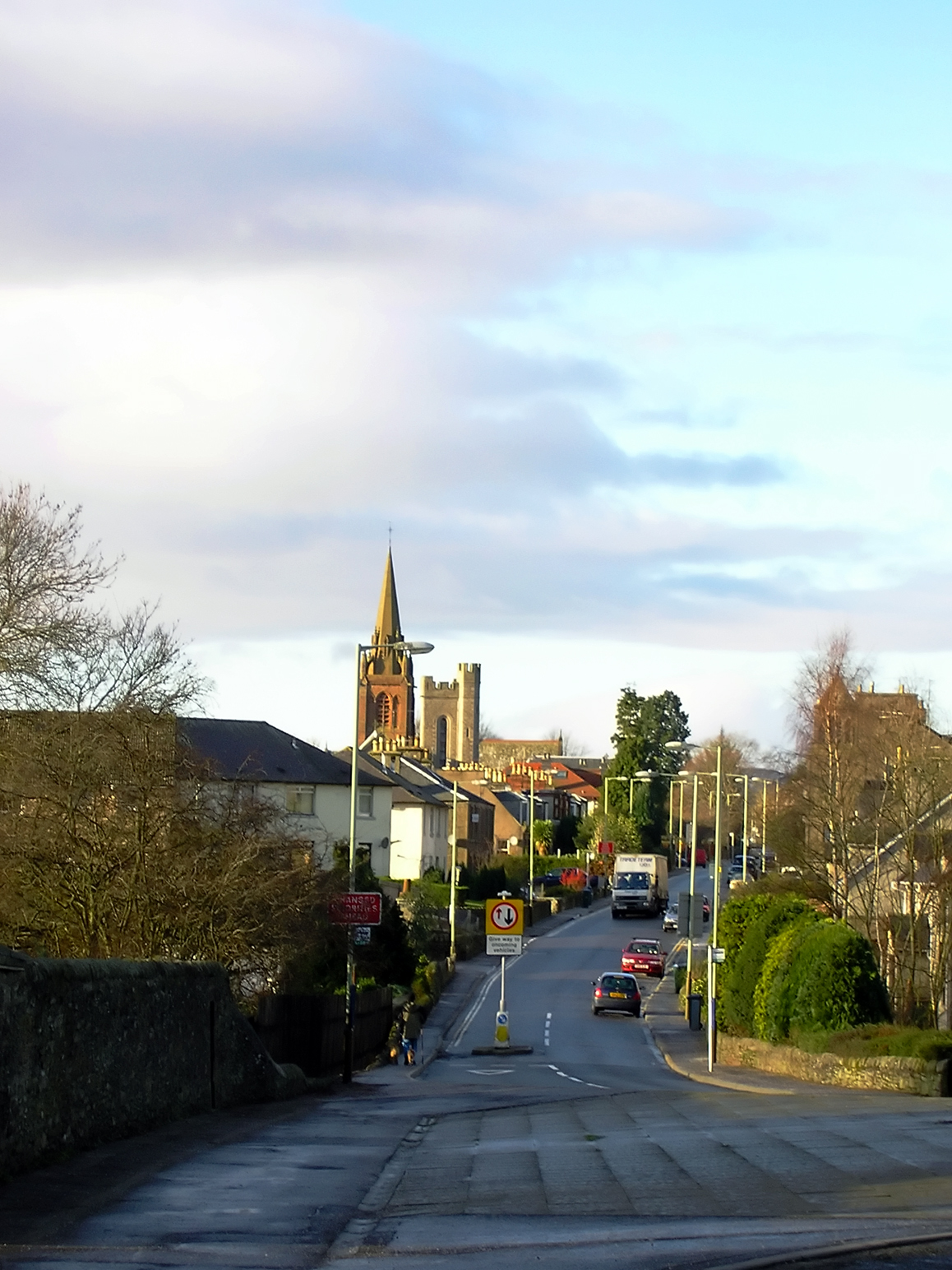
- The entrance to Invergowrie from Dundee

- Location within Perth and Kinross
- Population: 1,750 (2020)
- OS grid reference: NO347303
- Council area: Perth and Kinross
- Lieutenancy area: Perth and Kinross
- Country: Scotland
- Sovereign state: United Kingdom
- Post town: DUNDEE
- Postcode district: DD2
- Dialling code: 01382
- Police: Scotland
- Fire: Scottish
- Ambulance: Scottish
- UK Parliament: Perth and Kinross-shire
- Scottish Parliament: Perthshire North

Invergowrie (/ˌɪnvərˈɡaʊri/) is a village on the northwest bank of the Firth of Tay to the west of Dundee. Historically part of Perthshire, it was formerly incorporated as part of the city of Dundee, but is now administered as part of Perth and Kinross.

== History ==
The old parish church, a roofless 16th century building currently in poor condition, survives on a mound in the old kirkyard, by the Gowrie Burn. This site was formerly close to the sea; much land has been reclaimed from the Firth of Tay in recent times, and it is now some way inland. This was an early Christian site, dedicated to St Curetán. An artistically important and well-preserved cross-slab carved on five faces from this site is on display in the Museum of Scotland in Edinburgh. Dating from the early 9th century, the front shows a cross decorated with interlace, the back three stylised clerics, one holding an object which may be a charter with appended seal, above two dragon-like creatures.

This cross-slab was formerly built into a window of the medieval church, along with another smaller, damaged example, also now in Edinburgh (not on display).

The village was formerly part of the estate of Mylnefield. The quarry at Invergowrie supplied important sites around the UK, stone being included in the base of Nelson's Column and St Katherine's Docks in London. The quarry workers hit a spring at the beginning of the 20th century and the quarry filled with water. The former quarry can be seen as you leave Invergowrie station by train heading to Perth and now looks like a large lake. Until 1967, the main source of work in the village was a paper mill.

The legend of the Gows o' Gowrie, stones supposed thrown by the devil around Invergowrie. The prophecy comes from a verse by Thomas the Rhymer (circa 1280).

"When the Yowes o' Gowrie come to land,
The Day o' Judgement's near at hand"

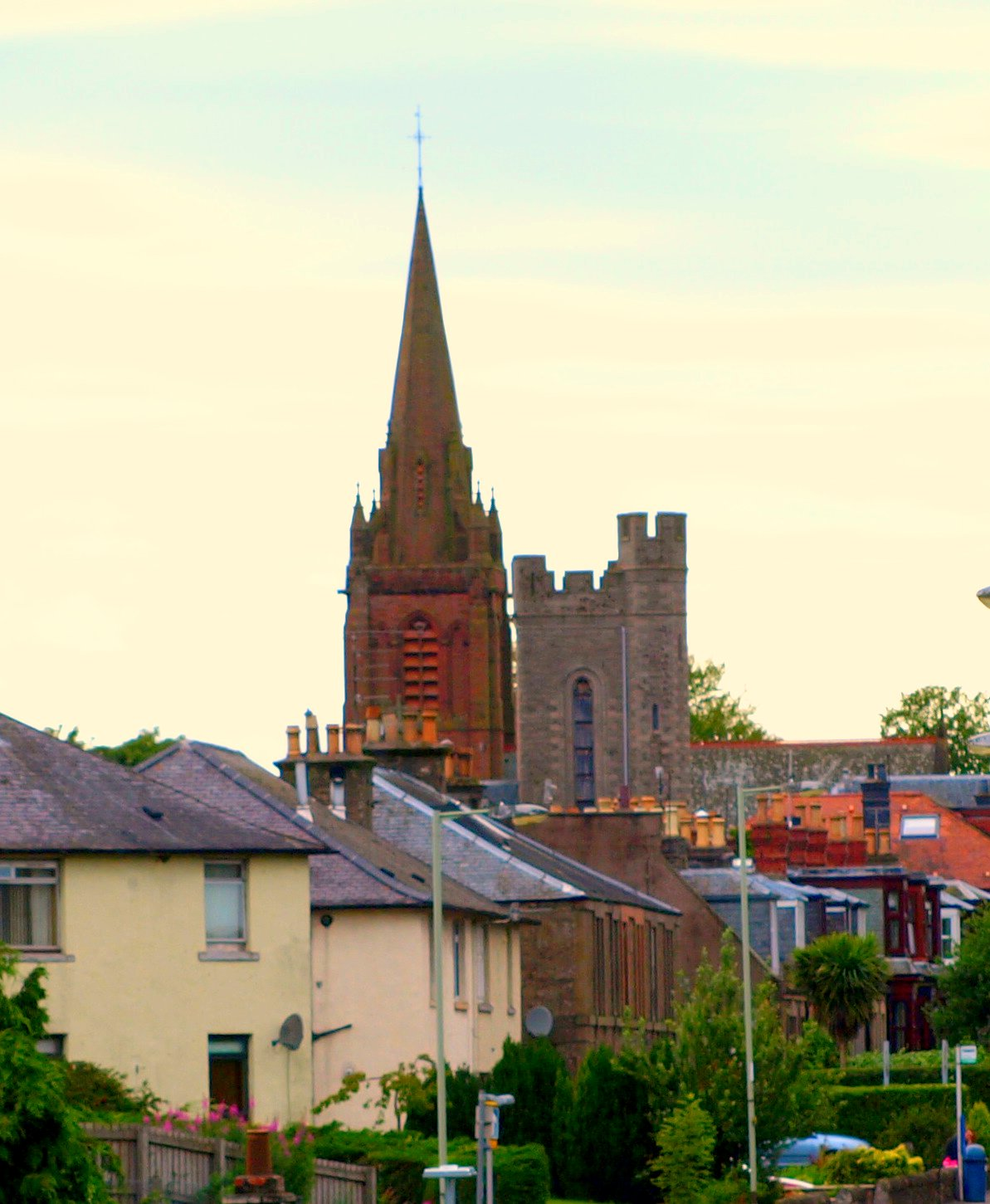
Invergowrie churches: the nearer square tower belongs to the Church of Scotland Parish Church of Invergowrie and the rear spire is the Scottish Episcopal Church of Invergowrie

Where the stones are, if they exist, has not been quite agreed. There is a "Deil's stone" at Greystanes, behind the Hilton hotel, surrounded by a Victorian fence. There is also a lump of rock which used to be called "the Paddock Stone" or the "Fairy Stone" in the wood situated on the Waterside road, near the quarry. It was said another stone was left in Invergowrie Bay, but that is now covered in silt and not visible. The Parish of Longforgan, by Adam Phillips, contains several paragraphs on the subject. The stones are of course glacial deposits. There was also the large Victorian house called "The Gows", now part of the Invergowrie Technology Park.

On 22 October 1979, a rail crash occurred after a warning signal was ignored resulting in the death of five people and 50 injuries.

== Geography ==
Invergowrie is located on the northwest bank of the Firth of Tay, with the Invergowrie Bay located just to the east and south of the village.

The village is included in the Dundee 'settlement' (contiguous built-up area defined by populated postcodes) along with Monifieth on the east side of the city, which similarly to Invergowrie was previously administered as part of Dundee but is now in another local authority area: Angus.

== Climate ==
The Mylnefield weather station was owned by the Met Office and is located in Invergowrie.

Climate data for Mylnefield, elevation 31m, 1991–2020, extremes 1960–2010
Month	Jan	Feb	Mar	Apr	May	Jun	Jul	Aug	Sep	Oct	Nov	Dec	Year
Record high °C (°F)	14.6 (58.3)	15.2 (59.4)	21.6 (70.9)	22.9 (73.2)	23.7 (74.7)	27.8 (82.0)	29.3 (84.7)	28.7 (83.7)	25.0 (77.0)	22.8 (73.0)	16.7 (62.1)	14.5 (58.1)	29.3 (84.7)
Mean daily maximum °C (°F)	6.7 (44.1)	7.5 (45.5)	9.5 (49.1)	12.0 (53.6)	14.9 (58.8)	17.4 (63.3)	19.4 (66.9)	19.3 (66.7)	16.9 (62.4)	13.1 (55.6)	9.4 (48.9)	6.8 (44.2)	12.7 (54.9)
Mean daily minimum °C (°F)	0.7 (33.3)	1.1 (34.0)	2.3 (36.1)	4.0 (39.2)	6.3 (43.3)	9.2 (48.6)	11.0 (51.8)	10.8 (51.4)	9.0 (48.2)	6.2 (43.2)	3.0 (37.4)	0.8 (33.4)	5.4 (41.7)
Record low °C (°F)	−17.1 (1.2)	−11.2 (11.8)	−10.0 (14.0)	−4.4 (24.1)	−2.3 (27.9)	−0.7 (30.7)	2.8 (37.0)	1.7 (35.1)	−0.6 (30.9)	−3.4 (25.9)	−10.4 (13.3)	−12.7 (9.1)	−17.1 (1.2)
Average precipitation mm (inches)	69.3 (2.73)	54.0 (2.13)	49.5 (1.95)	45.2 (1.78)	51.0 (2.01)	62.5 (2.46)	65.6 (2.58)	74.5 (2.93)	54.3 (2.14)	85.1 (3.35)	71.9 (2.83)	65.9 (2.59)	748.8 (29.48)
Average rainy days (≥ 1 mm)	12.1	9.7	9.4	8.6	9.7	10.8	11.0	10.6	9.4	11.6	12.4	11.9	127.2
Mean monthly sunshine hours	53.5	83.6	121.1	159.9	200.8	163.3	172.7	165.0	130.1	96.6	70.0	44.0	1,460.6
Source 1: Met Office,(all data except extremes)
Source 2: KNMI/ Royal Netherlands Meteorological Institute

== Transport ==
The A85 road runs to the northeast of Invergowrie, while the A90 road runs to the north and northwest of the village.

ScotRail manages Invergowrie railway station and provides a roughly hourly train service on the Glasgow–Dundee line. Some eastbound services continue to Arbroath.

Frequent bus services connect Invergowrie to Dundee, Perth and Fife. Stagecoach Strathtay operate services to Perth, Dundee City Centre and Kirkcaldy.

Dundee Airport is situated east of the village, providing flights to London City and Belfast City airports.
