= David Hopkirk =

Scottish footballer (born 1993)

Personal information
- Date of birth: 17 January 1993 (age 33)
- Place of birth: Clydebank, Scotland
- Height: 1.80 m (5 ft 11 in)
- Position: Forward

Youth career
- 2009–2010: Hamilton Academical

Senior career*
| Years | Team | Apps | (Gls) |
| 2010–2011 | Hamilton Academical | 8 | (0) |
| 2011–2012 | Heart of Midlothian | 0 | (0) |
| 2012–2013 | Queen of the South | 5 | (1) |
| 2012 | → Annan Athletic (loan) | 3 | (5) |
| 2013–2015 | Annan Athletic | 59 | (17) |
| 2015–2017 | Dunfermline Athletic | 59 | (9) |
| 2018 | Derry City | 3 | (1) |
| 2018 | Clyde | 0 | (0) |
| 2019–2021 | Stenhousemuir | 40 | (9) |
| 2021–2022 | Dumbarton | 7 | (0) |

International career^{‡}
| 2011 | Scotland U19 | 2 | (0) |
- * Club domestic league appearances and goals as of 23:18, 16 October 2021 (UTC) ‡ National team caps and goals as of 6 September 2011

David Hopkirk (born 17 January 1993) is a Scottish professional footballer who last played as a forward for Dumbarton.

Hopkirk, who started his career with Hamilton Academical, has previously played for Heart of Midlothian, Queen of the South, Annan Athletic, Dunfermline Athletic, Derry City, Clyde and Stenhousemuir.

== Career ==
After initially playing with their youth team, Hopkirk signed an 18-month professional contract with Hamilton Academical in February 2010. After signing a contract extension in May of that year, Hopkirk made his professional debut for the club in the Scottish Premier League on 13 November 2010, aged 17, in a 3–1 home defeat against Inverness Caledonian Thistle. Hopkirk was released by Accies on 22 September 2011. Following his release, he trained with West Bromwich Albion. Cardiff City and Ipswich Town were also interested in signing him.

Hopkirk spent a few months of the 2011–12 season in the reserves at Hearts, though he did not formally sign for them. He later signed with Queen of the South on 9 August 2012 and was then loaned out to Annan Athletic for the month of November 2012, before returning to Queens at the start of December 2012. When his contract ended with Queens on 31 December 2012, Hopkirk signed permanently for Annan Athletic on 1 January 2013. After spending two years with the Scottish League Two side, Hopkirk moved up a division, signing for Dunfermline Athletic during the winter transfer period in 2015. Hopkirk made his first start for the side against Ayr United, scoring once in a 2–0 victory. Hopkirk spent almost three years with the Fife side before being released on 9 November 2017.

Hopkirk subsequently signed a pre-contract agreement with League of Ireland Premier Division club Derry City on 28 November 2017, which would see him join the club officially in January 2018. Hopkirk left Northern Ireland in May 2018, after scoring one goal in only four appearances in his short spell. He signed for Scottish League Two club Clyde shortly after leaving Derry, but failed to make an appearance and was released in October. Hopkin then spent two seasons with Stenhousemuir before joining Dumbarton in June 2021. He took a break from football in October 2021, but remained under contract with the Sons before leaving the club officially in May 2022.

== International career ==
He made his international debut for the Scotland under-19 team in May 2011.

== Career statistics ==
As of 23:18, 16 October 2021 (UTC)

Appearances and goals by club, season and competition
| Club | Season | League | | | Scottish Cup | | League Cup | | Other | | Total | |
| Club | Season | Division | Apps | Goals | Apps | Goals | Apps | Goals | Apps | Goals | Apps | Goals |
|---|---|---|---|---|---|---|---|---|---|---|---|---|
| Hamilton Academical | 2010–11 | Scottish Premier League | 5 | 0 | 0 | 0 | 0 | 0 | 0 | 0 | 5 | 0 |
| Hamilton Academical | 2011–12 | Scottish First Division | 3 | 0 | 0 | 0 | 0 | 0 | 1 | 1 | 4 | 1 |
| Hamilton Academical | Total | | 8 | 0 | 0 | 0 | 0 | 0 | 1 | 1 | 9 | 1 |
| Heart of Midlothian | 2011–12 | Scottish Premier League | 0 | 0 | 0 | 0 | 0 | 0 | 0 | 0 | 0 | 0 |
| Queen of the South | 2012–13 | Scottish Second Division | 5 | 1 | 0 | 0 | 0 | 0 | 1 | 0 | 6 | 1 |
| Annan Athletic | 2012–13 | Scottish Third Division | 3 | 5 | 0 | 0 | 0 | 0 | 0 | 0 | 3 | 5 |
| Annan Athletic | 2012–13 | Scottish Third Division | 18 | 5 | 0 | 0 | 0 | 0 | 0 | 0 | 18 | 5 |
| Annan Athletic | 2013–14 | Scottish League Two | 19 | 7 | 4 | 1 | 1 | 0 | 3 | 1 | 27 | 9 |
| Annan Athletic | 2014–15 | Scottish League Two | 22 | 5 | 4 | 1 | 1 | 1 | 1 | 0 | 28 | 7 |
| Annan Athletic | Total | | 62 | 22 | 8 | 2 | 2 | 1 | 4 | 1 | 76 | 26 |
| Dunfermline Athletic | 2014–15 | Scottish League One | 12 | 1 | 0 | 0 | 0 | 0 | 0 | 0 | 12 | 1 |
| Dunfermline Athletic | 2015–16 | Scottish League One | 28 | 4 | 1 | 0 | 3 | 0 | 2 | 0 | 34 | 4 |
| Dunfermline Athletic | 2016–17 | Scottish Championship | 11 | 2 | 1 | 0 | 0 | 0 | 1 | 0 | 13 | 2 |
| Dunfermline Athletic | 2017–18 | Scottish Championship | 8 | 2 | 0 | 0 | 1 | 0 | 1 | 0 | 10 | 2 |
| Dunfermline Athletic | Total | | 59 | 9 | 2 | 0 | 4 | 0 | 4 | 0 | 69 | 9 |
| Derry City | 2018 | Premier Division | 3 | 1 | 0 | 0 | 1 | 0 | 0 | 0 | 4 | 1 |
| Clyde | 2018–19 | Scottish League Two | 0 | 0 | 0 | 0 | 0 | 0 | 0 | 0 | 0 | 0 |
| Stenhousemuir | 2019–20 | Scottish League Two | 26 | 8 | 1 | 0 | 4 | 0 | 4 | 2 | 35 | 10 |
| Stenhousemuir | 2020–21 | Scottish League Two | 14 | 1 | 2 | 0 | 2 | 0 | 0 | 0 | 18 | 1 |
| Stenhousemuir | Total | | 40 | 9 | 3 | 0 | 6 | 0 | 4 | 2 | 53 | 11 |
| Dumbarton | 2021–22 | Scottish League One | 7 | 0 | 0 | 0 | 3 | 0 | 1 | 0 | 11 | 0 |
| Career total | | | 183 | 42 | 13 | 2 | 15 | 1 | 15 | 4 | 226 | 49 |

== Honours ==
=== Club ===
Dunfermline Athletic

- Scottish League One: 2015–16
