= Firth of Tay =

Estuary of the River Tay in Scotland

- Location in Scotland
- Location: Scotland, United Kingdom
- Coordinates: 56.44°N 03.00°W

Ramsar Wetland
- Official name: Firth of Tay and Eden Estuary
- Designated: 28 July 2000
- Reference no.: 1034

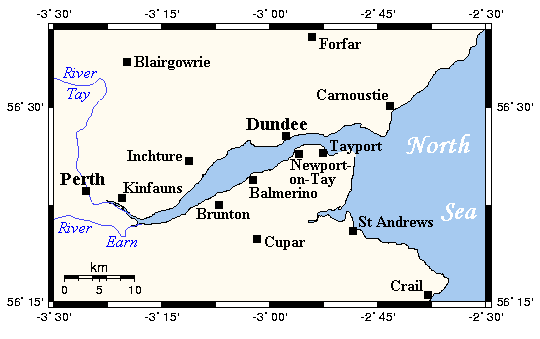
A map of the Firth of Tay and environs

The Firth of Tay (/ˈteɪ/; Scottish Gaelic: Linne Tatha) is a firth on the east coast of Scotland, into which empties the River Tay (Scotland's largest river in terms of flow). The firth is surrounded by four council areas: Fife, Perth and Kinross, Dundee City, and Angus. Its maximum width (at Invergowrie) is 3 mi (4.8 km).

Two bridges span the firth: the Tay Road Bridge and the Tay Rail Bridge. The marshy Mugdrum Island is the only major island in the firth.

The Firth of Tay in Antarctica was discovered in 1892–1893 by Captain Thomas Robertson of the Dundee whaling expedition and named by him after the one in Scotland. He also named nearby Dundee Island in honour of the main city on the firth.

== Natural heritage ==
The Firth of Tay and the Eden Estuary (which lies 8 mi (13 km) to the south of the firth) were designated as Special Protection Areas on 2 February 2000, as Ramsar wetlands a few months later (on 28 July 2000), and as Special Areas of Conservation five years later (on 17 March 2005). Several parts of the firth are within a site of special scientific interest – Inner Tay Estuary, Monifieth Bay, Tayport-Tentsmuir Coast. The Invergowrie Bay section of the firth is a local nature reserve.

The Firth of Tay is noted for its extensive sand and mudflats, its population of common seals, and its wintering birds (such as oystercatcher, bar-tailed godwit, shelduck and velvet scoter). There is good access to much of the shoreline, and the firth offers many good wildlife-watching opportunities.

The reed bed on the north shore of the inner estuary in the firth is about 15 km long; it is thought to be the most extensive reedbed in Britain.

== Towns and villages along the coast ==
- Balmerino
- Broughty Ferry
- Dundee
- Invergowrie
- Kingoodie
- Monifieth
- Newburgh
- Newport-on-Tay
- Tayport
- Woodhaven
- Wormit

== Places of interest ==
- Balmerino Abbey
- Broughty Castle Museum
- Mugdrum Island
- Tay Rail Bridge
- Tay Road Bridge
- Tentsmuir Forest
- Tentsmuir National Nature Reserve
