= Scott Christie =

Scottish footballer

Personal information
- Date of birth: 13 November 1987 (age 39)
- Place of birth: Falkirk, Scotland
- Position: Goalkeeper

Youth career
- Stirling Albion

Senior career*
Years	Team	Apps	(Gls)
2003–2011	Stirling Albion	101	(0)
2011–2012	Bo'ness United	49	(1)
2011	→ Hamilton Academical (loan)	3	(0)
2012–2013	Hamilton Academical	0	(0)
2013–2015	Linlithgow Rose	64	(0)
2015–2017	Bo'ness United	40	(1)
2017–2019	Kelty Hearts		
- * Club domestic league appearances and goals as of 15:26, 14 June 2019(UTC)

Scott Christie is a Scottish footballer who last played as a goalkeeper for Kelty Hearts. He started his career at Stirling Albion by progressing through the youth system, then played for Bo'ness United, Linlithgow Rose and Hamilton Academical.

== Club career ==
=== Stirling Albion (2003–2011) ===
Christie was in the squad which gained promotion to the Scottish Football League First Division via the play-offs where on 12 May 2007 Stirling Albion defeated Airdrie.

Christie was the goalkeeper for the Stirling Albion side that faced Celtic FC at Celtic Park which finished 3–0 to Celtic. It wasn't all plain sailing for the cup holders, with Jan Vennegoor of Hesselink only breaking the deadlock in the 37th minute with a powerful header passed the Stirling keeper and the final goal came from a 25-yard spectacular from Shunsuke Nakamura.

He played when Stirling Albion were defeated 9–0 in the Scottish Cup 4th round match against Ross County in February 2010. Christie went on to win the Second Division with Stirling Albion during the 2009–10 Scottish Second Division season.

Christie was in the squad when the players offered to play for free in February 2011 due to the ongoing financial situation at the club. His last game for the Albion was at Forthbank against Morton in a game which finished 3–2 for Stirling. After eight years service at the club, he was released on 15 May 2011.

=== Bo'ness United (2011–2012) ===
Christie signed with Scottish East region Super League side Bo'ness United after his deal with former Stirling manager Allan Moore fell through at Greencock Morton. He was eventually made the club captain during his first season.

After an impressive start at Bo'ness United Christie was loaned out to Hamilton Academical. During December he made three appearances for the club and his debut was against his home town of Falkirk which ended in a 0–0 draw. Scott also saved a penalty against Queen of the South in a 2–1 win for the Accies and his last game was in December against Morton at New Douglas Park.

=== Hamilton Academical (2012–2013) ===
Billy Reid then signed Christie for the first division Hamilton in August 2012 on a part-time contract, where he was the understudy to Kevin Cuthbert for the majority of the season.

Accies then agreed to place him on the transfer list at his own request. This allowed for the 2012–13 Scottish Junior Football East Region Super League champions Linlithgow Rose to agree a fee for Christie.

=== Linlithgow Rose (2013–2015) ===
After spending two years at the club, the goalkeeper was again made available for transfer for Linlithgow's rivals Bo'ness to make a bid for Christie.

=== Bo'ness United (2015–2017) ===
Christie joined Bo'ness for a second spell playing with the East Super League Side for a further year making 40 appearances in his first year as well as playing two games on an emergency loan basis with 2011 Slovak Second Football League champions FK AS Trenčín.

During Christie's first year he won the 2015-16 East of Scotland cup after beating Dundonald Bluebell 5–1 at Creamery Park in Bathgate.

=== Kelty Hearts (2017–2019) ===
After a season of injuries at Bo'ness United Christie then signed for the Fife-based football club Kelty Hearts who made their professional debut in the senior ranks in the same season that Christie signed in the East of Scotland Football League.

Christie made his debut for the Hearts on 29 July against Tynecastle in the Qualifying League Cup, where Kelty won at the Saughton Enclosure by three goals to one.

Christie would go on to win several trophies during his time with Kelty Hearts including the East of Scotland League before moving on in 2019.

== Honours ==
- Stirlingshire Cup 2003/04, 2004/05, 2005/06
- 2006–07 Scottish Second Division – Runner up
- 2009–10 Scottish Second Division
- 2013/14 Fife and Lothians Junior cup
- 2015/16 East of Scotland Junior cup
