= Kingoodie =

Coordinates: 56.451840°N 3.074401°W

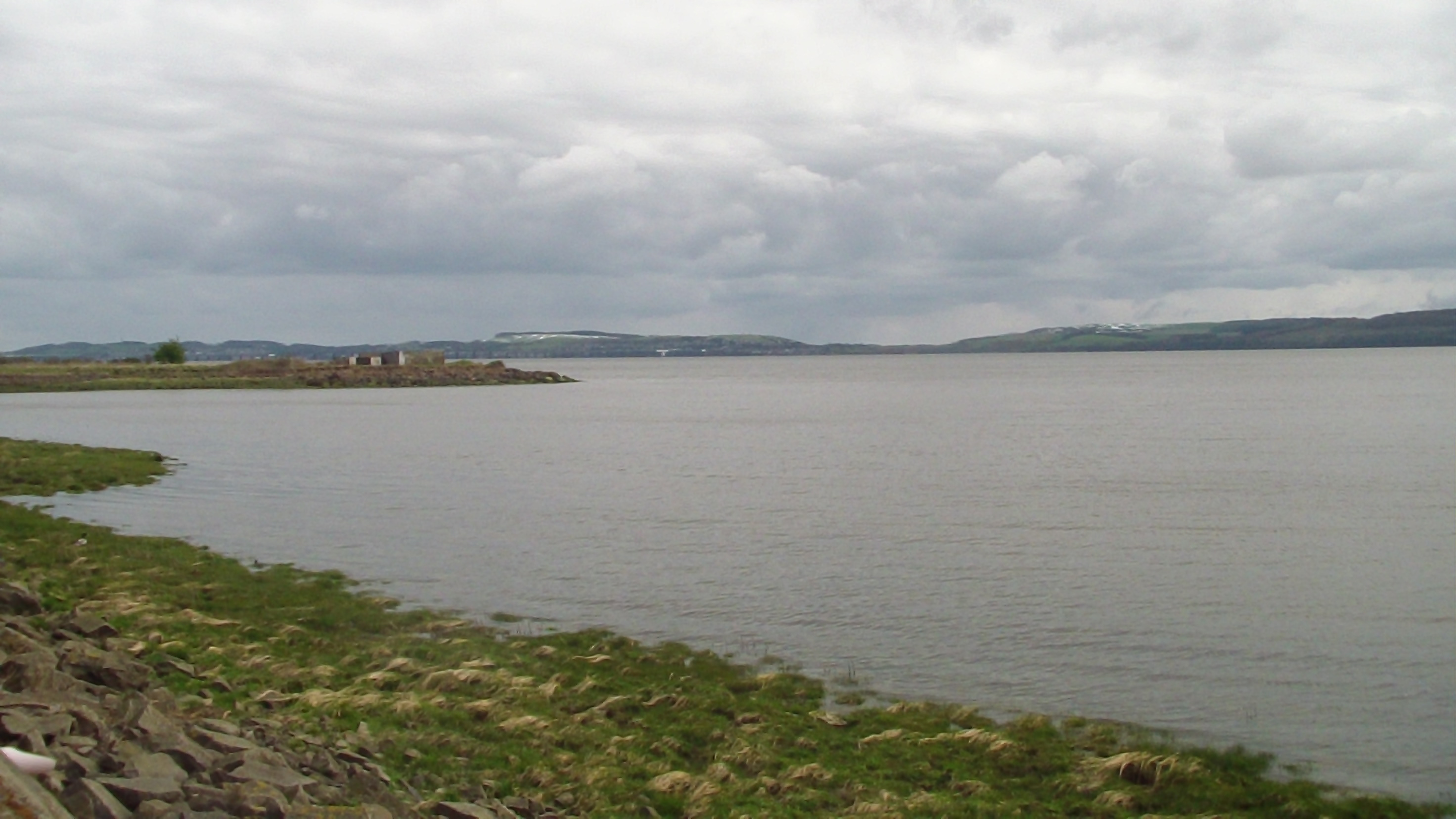
Stone from the nearby quarries was formerly loaded onto barges in Kingoodie Bay

Kingoodie (Scottish Gaelic: Ceann Gaothach or Ceann na Gaoithe "windy head(land)") is a hamlet about 4 miles (6.4 km) south west of Dundee, but in the region of Perth and Kinross, Scotland. The shore is easily accessible and close to the Firth of Tay.

Quarries close to Kingoodie supplied the town with building stone for a number of centuries. This stone was important for the building of sea walls to protect the town from the tide and the harbour works. Stone for the tennis court at Falkland Palace was quarried near Kingoodie in 1540 and shipped to Lindores, north of the palace on the River Tay.

There is a headland jutting out to sea in front of the village. This is mentioned in Groome's Ordnance Gazetteer of Scotland (1882–4) in the Drimmie entry.
