= James Gibson (footballer, born 1989) =

Scottish footballer

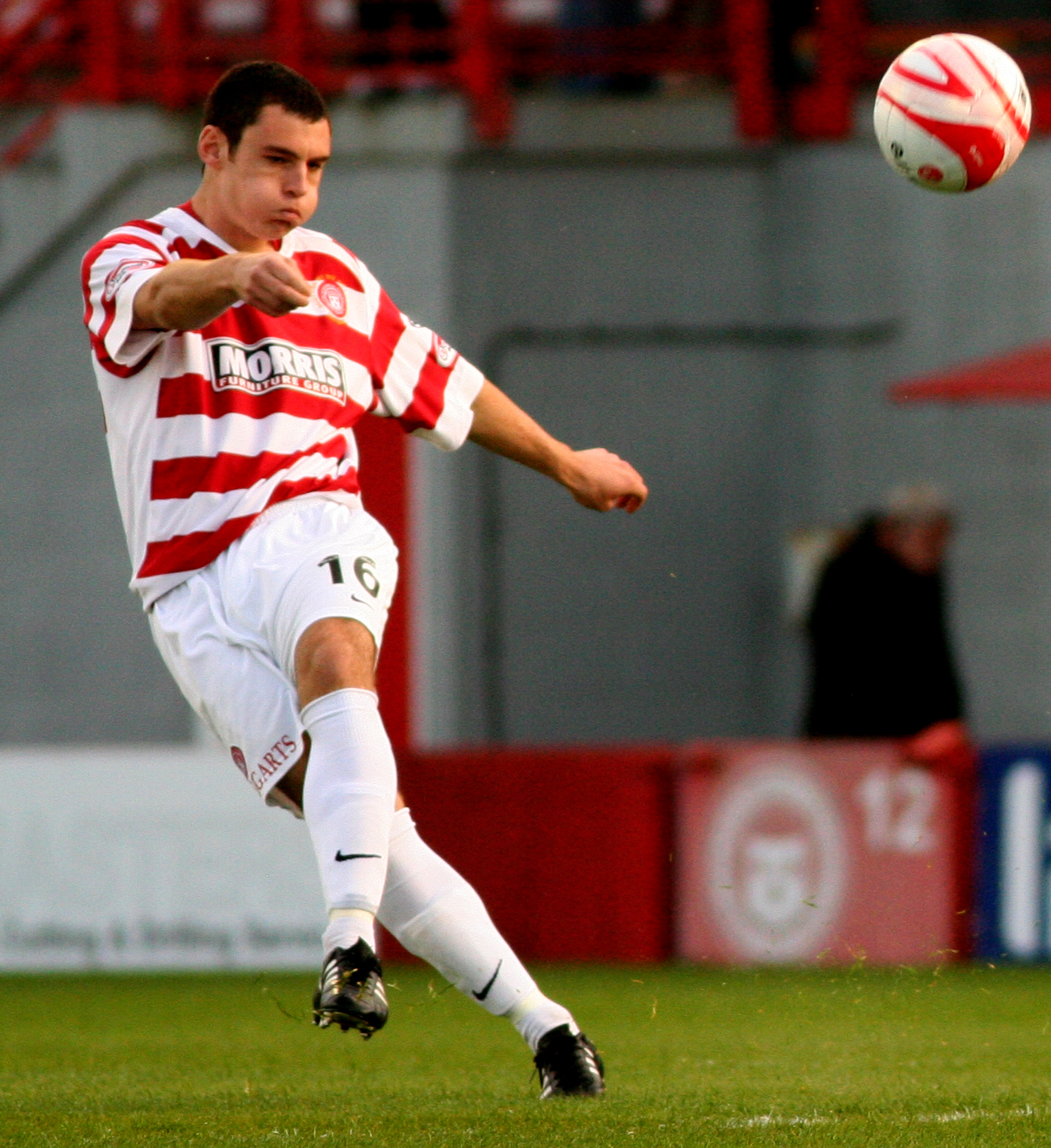

Personal information
- Full name: James Gibson
- Date of birth: 23 April 1989 (age 37)
- Place of birth: Irvine, Scotland
- Position: Left back

Team information
- Current team: Maybole

Youth career
- Hamilton Academical

Senior career*
Years	Team	Apps	(Gls)
2006–2011	Hamilton Academical	43	(2)
- * Club domestic league appearances and goals as of 13:32, 1 May 2010 (UTC)

James Gibson (born 23 April 1989 in Irvine, Scotland) is a Scottish footballer who plays as a left back for Maybole in the Ayrshire District League. Originally signed with Hamilton Academical, his playing career in the Scottish Football League and Scottish Premier League with was plagued by persistent knee injuries. Gibson's contract with Accies was not renewed in 2011 and he signed for Junior side Maybole in January 2012.

== Career ==
James Gibson's footballing career was short with Hamilton Athletic. He made 43 appearances for the club. He played left back and occasionally midfield. His best moments were of him scoring his two goals over his five-year career. Injuries however, derailed his career. He had awful knee injuries that caused him to miss numerous games. Overall his career was disappointing and was cut off short. His brightest moment was winning the domestic championship with Hamilton Academical in the 2007/2008 season.

== Honours ==
- Scottish Football League First Division: 2007–08
