= David Elebert =

Irish footballer and coach

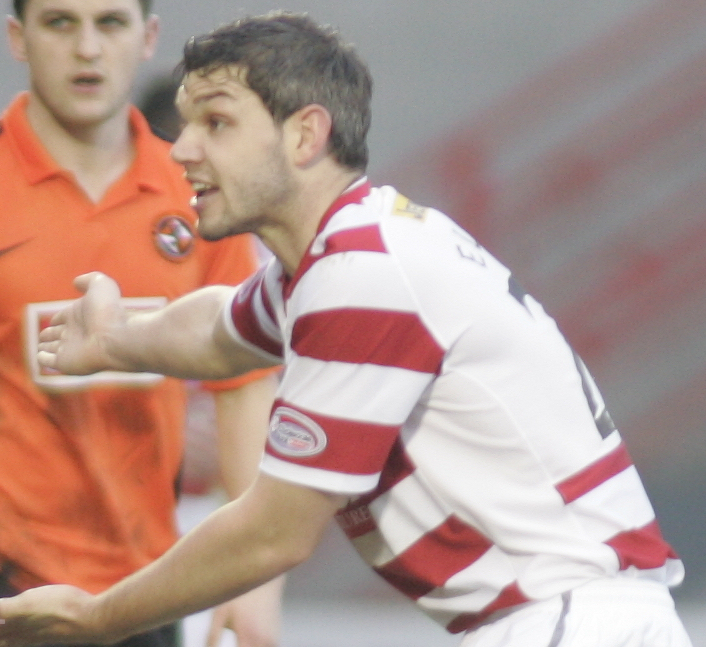

Personal information
- Date of birth: 21 March 1986 (age 40)
- Place of birth: Dublin, Ireland
- Positions: Centre back; right back

Youth career
- 2002–2004: Preston North End

Senior career*
Years	Team	Apps	(Gls)
2004–2006	Preston North End	0	(0)
2005	→ Scarborough (loan)	12	(0)
2006–2011	Hamilton Academical	167	(12)
2012	Fylkir	34	(1)
2013	Shamrock Rovers	25	(0)
2014	Derry City	7	(0)
2015–2017	Glenavon	42	(6)
2017–2018	Ards	35	(1)

International career
2008	Republic of Ireland U21	4	(0)
- * Club domestic league appearances and goals

David Elebert (born 21 March 1986) is an Irish former professional football player who is a coach at NIFL Premiership Ards

His uncle Shaun played for Shamrock Rovers and Longford Town in the early 1990s and won the Football Association of Ireland International Schools Player of the Year for 1990/91.

== Career ==
=== Club ===
Elebert began his career as a trainee at Preston North End but failed to make any first team appearances for the club. In 2005, he had a loan spell at Scarborough.

He was signed by Hamilton in January 2006 having been released by Preston and signed a new two-year deal in May 2008.

He was released by Hamilton Academical at the end of season 2010/11. He joined Icelandic club Fylkir on 12 April 2012. He made his debut for the club in the 1–1 draw with Keflavík on 6 May 2012 and scored his first goal in Icelandic football in the 2–1 defeat away at KR on 5 July 2012.

In February 2013 Elebert signed for Shamrock Rovers where he won an EA Sports and a Setanta Sports Cup winners medal.

On 12 February 2014, Elebert signed for Derry City under Roddy Collins.

On 27 January 2015, Elebert signed for NIFL Premiership side and 2013–14 Irish Cup winners Glenavon, signing an 18-month contract with the Lurgan Blues.

Elebert won the 2015–16 Irish Cup with Glenavon, and left the club at the end of the 2016–17 season.

On 15 June 2017, Elebert signed for Ards.

=== International ===
He was called up to the Republic of Ireland's under-21s in May 2008 and made his debut against Malaysia's under-23s later that month. He captained the side against Nigeria in his next game.

== Honours ==
Hamilton Academical

- Scottish Football League First Division: 2007–08

Shamrock Rovers

- Setanta Cup: 2013
- EA Sports Cup: 2013

Glenavon

- Irish Cup: 2015–16
