= Mark McLaughlin =

Scottish footballer

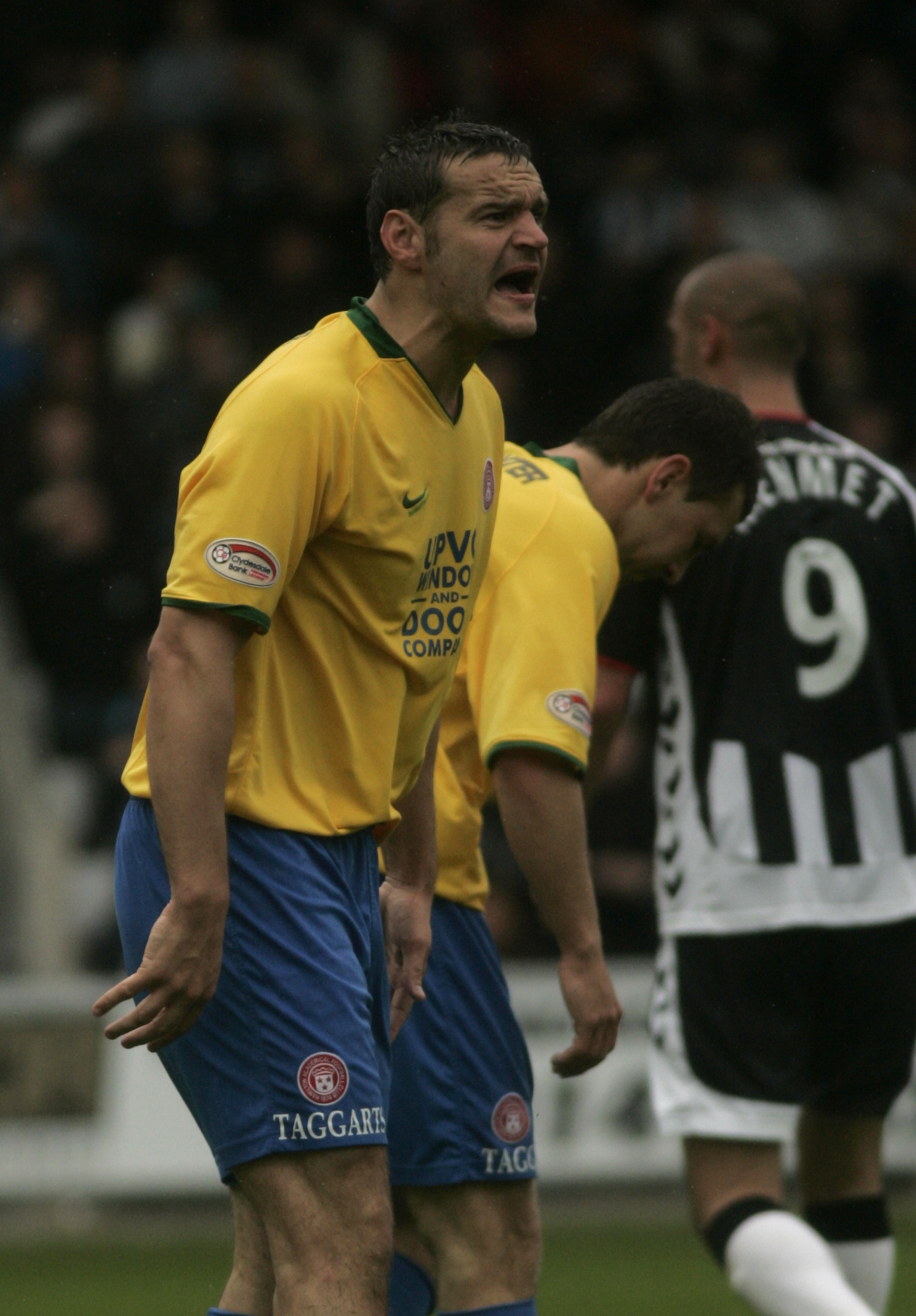

Personal information
- Full name: Mark McLaughlin
- Date of birth: 2 December 1975 (age 50)
- Place of birth: Greenock, Scotland
- Position: Defender

Senior career*
Years	Team	Apps	(Gls)
–1999	Arthurlie	?	(?)
1999–2004	Clyde	97	(14)
2004–2012	Hamilton Academical	193	(17)
2012–2013	Greenock Morton	34	(3)
2014–2015	Dumbarton	16	(1)
2015–2016	Clyde	37	(2)
2016–2018	Beith Juniors		
- * Club domestic league appearances and goals

Mark McLaughlin (born 2 December 1975) is a Scottish former professional footballer.

Since turning senior in 1999, McLaughlin has played over 100 games for both Clyde and Hamilton Academical. He has also played for Greenock Morton and Dumbarton.

== Career ==
McLaughlin, a defender, began his career at junior club Arthurlie before moving to Clyde in 1999.

=== Clyde ===
McLaughlin made his debut with Clyde in a 3–1 win away from home against Stenhousemuir. On 7 October 2000 he scored his first senior football goal away to Alloa Athletic at the Recreation Park Alloa's home ground and only two weeks later he scored in a 2–2 draw against Ross County at Broadwood in the Scottish Football League First Division.

In July 2002, McLaughlin had a trial with Luton Town, which was later cancelled because he was struggling with an injury.

=== Hamilton ===
After five years at Clyde, he joined Hamilton Academical in 2004. He was part of the 2007–08 campaign for promotion to the SPL.

=== Greenock Morton ===
After McLaughlin's contract expired at Hamilton, he rejected a new deal and decided to join the team that he has supported since childhood, Greenock Morton.

McLaughlin was named as Morton's captain in August 2012. He was released from his Morton contract on Christmas Eve 2013. Since leaving Greenock Morton, McLaughlin says his departure left him "disappointed" because "Kenny Shiels said to me that I maybe wasn't going to play much. That's fair enough. He then told me that Airdrieonians had come in and asked if they could take me on loan. He said Airdrie would pay half my wages and Morton would pay half my wages, but I said, 'Well, I don't want to go out on loan'.

=== Dumbarton ===
After McLaughlin was released by Morton, he signed for SPFL Championship side Dumbarton. He was given the number 5 shirt. He scored his first goal for the club in a 5–1 win against Alloa Athletic on his third appearance.On 16 May 2014 McLaughlin signed a new one-year deal with the Sons.

In January 2015 'Marko' was released by the club following a lack of game time.

=== Clyde ===
On 20 January 2015, McLaughlin signed for Clyde for a second time. He was released at the end of the 2015–16 season and returned to the juniors with Beith. He retired in June 2018.

== Personal life ==
McLaughlin grew up in Port Glasgow.

== Honours ==
Arthurlie

- Scottish Junior Cup: 1997–98

Clyde

- Scottish Second Division: 1999–2000

Hamilton Academical

- Scottish First Division: 2007–08

Beith Juniors

- West Region Premiership: 2017–18
- Evening Times Champions Cup: 2017–18
