= Jon Routledge =

English footballer (born 1989)

Personal information
- Full name: Jonathan Joseph Routledge
- Date of birth: 23 November 1989 (age 36)
- Place of birth: Liverpool, England
- Height: 5 ft 7 in (1.70 m)
- Position: Midfielder

Youth career
- 1997–2007: Liverpool
- 2007–2008: Wigan Athletic

Senior career*
Years	Team	Apps	(Gls)
2008–2011	Wigan Athletic	1	(0)
2010	→ Östersund (loan)	2	(0)
2010–2011	→ Hamilton Academical (loan)	14	(1)
2011	Hamilton Academical	10	(0)
2011–2012	Stockport County	14	(0)
2012	→ Hamilton Academical (loan)	16	(2)
2012–2015	Hamilton Academical	60	(2)
2015–2016	Dumbarton	31	(0)
2016–2024	The New Saints	195	(18)
2024	→ Marine (loan)	5	(0)
- * Club domestic league appearances and goals as of 24 April 2024

Jonathan Joseph Routledge (born 23 November 1989) is an English professional footballer.

== Career ==
Born in Liverpool, Routledge started his career in the Academy of hometown club Liverpool, but left after 10 years to join Wigan Athletic in 2007. He signed a professional contract with Wigan in the summer of 2008, and he impressed enough to sign on for a further year in 2009. He made his first team debut on 24 May 2009 in a Premier League match against Portsmouth. He joined Östersund of the Swedish football Division 1 on loan until the end of the 2009–10 season on 1 April 2010.

On 12 August 2010, he joined Scottish Premier League side Hamilton Academical on loan until January 2011. On 1 February 2011, Routledge signed a permanent deal with Hamilton until the end of the season after having his contract cancelled by Wigan.

In the summer of 2011 he joined Stockport County before in January 2012 returning to Hamilton on loan until the end of the season. He rejoined Hamilton in the summer of 2012 on a permanent deal. He was released by Hamilton in March 2015. In July 2015, Routledge signed a one-year contract with Scottish Championship side Dumbarton. He was sent off for the first time in a 3–1 victory over Alloa.

After 38 appearances he left the club in May 2016 and moved to Wales, joining Welsh Premier League champions The New Saints.

== Honours ==
The New Saints

- Welsh Premier League: 2016–17
- Welsh League Cup: 2016–17, 2017–18

Individual

- Welsh Premier League Team of the Year: 2016–17
