= 2019–20 Partick Thistle F.C. season =

Partick Thistle
2019–20 season
- Chairman: Jacqui Low
- Manager: Gary Caldwell (until 18 September); Ian McCall (from 23 September)
- Stadium: Firhill Stadium
- Scottish Championship: 10th (relegated)
- Scottish Cup: Fourth round
- League Cup: Quarter-finals
- Scottish Challenge Cup: Semi-finals
- Top goalscorer: League: Kenny Miller (5); All: Kenny Miller (9)
- Highest home attendance: 9,542 vs. Celtic, Scottish Cup, 18 January 2020
- Lowest home attendance: 1,380 vs. Connah's Quay Nomads, Challenge Cup, 12 October 2019
- Average home league attendance: 3,078
Home colours	Away colours

The 2019–20 season was Partick Thistle's second consecutive season in the Scottish Championship, having been relegated from the Scottish Premiership at the end of the 2017–18 season. Partick Thistle also competed in the League Cup, the Scottish Challenge Cup, Scottish Cup and the revived Glasgow Cup. On 15 April, the SPFL voted to end the lower leagues in Scottish football due to the coronavirus pandemic and as a result Partick were relegated to League One after two years in the Championship, which the club decided not to take legal action against.

== Season summary ==
Following a difficult start to the season, Gary Caldwell was sacked as manager on 18 September after eleven months in charge. At the time of Caldwell's departure, the club had recorded two draws and three losses in the first five games of the league campaign and sat ninth of the ten teams in the Scottish Championship. On 23 September, Ayr United manager Ian McCall was announced as Caldwell's successor for a second spell at Partick Thistle, having previously managed the club between 2007 and 2011. Alan Archibald, who had been dismissed as manager in October 2018 after five years in charge, also returned to the club as assistant manager, with former Ayr United midfielder Neil Scally also joining the coaching staff.

McCall's first game in charge was Partick Thistle's quarter-final match against Celtic in the Scottish League Cup on 25 September, which Celtic won 5–0. Three days later the club achieved its first league win of the season with a 3–1 victory over Inverness Caledonian Thistle, lifting them from the bottom of the Championship to ninth above Alloa Athletic. It was not until November that the team's first home win of the season was secured after a 2–1 victory over Greenock Morton, by which time the club had fallen back into last place.

In November EuroMillions lottery winner Colin Weir assumed overall control of the club after purchasing a majority of club's shares. Weir, who had won a £161 million jackpot in 2011 and had previously contributed £2 million to Partick Thistle, stated his intentions were to donate the majority stake to a fan group by the end of March 2020 to allow fan ownership of the club. Weir died after a short illness on 27 December, and was replaced by former chairman Jacqui Low in February 2020.

On 13 March 2020 all football in Scotland, including the Scottish Championship, was suspended until further notice due to the COVID-19 pandemic in the country. At the time of suspension Partick Thistle was in last place in the Scottish Championship, two points behind ninth-placed Queen of the South with one game fewer played. A proposal by the Scottish Professional Football League (SPFL) to end the season for all leagues prematurely in mid-April 2020, despite an objection from Dundee F.C., led Partick Thistle to announce a legal effort to overturn the decision. Following Dundee F.C.'s withdrawal of their objection and subsequent support for the SPFL's proposal, the club announced it would not pursue legal action due to the financial cost. With prize money and promotions and relegations decided on positions achieved at the time of suspension in March, Partick Thistle were therefore relegated from the Scottish Championship to League One, the first time the club had fallen to the third tier of Scottish football since 2006.

== Competitions ==
=== Scottish Championship ===
3 August 2019 1	Alloa Athletic	1 – 1	Partick Thistle	Recreation Park
15:00	Hetherington 34'	Report	Cardle 60'	Attendance: 1,672; Referee: Nick Walsh

9 August 2019 2	Partick Thistle	1 – 2	Dundee United	Firhill Stadium
19:05	Saunders 23'	Report	Shankland 55'; Pawlett 73'	Attendance: 3,218; Referee: William Collum
Note: Game televised on BBC Scotland

23 August 2019 3	Greenock Morton	3 – 2	Partick Thistle	Cappielow
19:05	Cadden 72'; Sutton 77'; McLean 80'	Report	Miller 25'; De Vita 28'	Attendance: 2,197; Referee: Bobby Madden
Note: Game televised on BBC Scotland

31 August 2019 4	Partick Thistle	2 – 3	Ayr United	Firhill Stadium
15:00	Bannigan 14' (pen.) (red card) 65'; Gordon 43' (red card) 44'	Report	McCowan 24'; Doolan 72'; Kelly 78'	Attendance: 3,060; Referee: Andrew Dallas

13 September 2019 5	Arbroath	1 – 1	Partick Thistle	Gayfield Park
19:05	Thomson 14'	Report	Miller 65'	Attendance: 1,214; Referee: David Munro
Note: Game televised on BBC Scotland

21 September 2019 6	Partick Thistle	0 – 3	Dunfermline Athletic	Firhill Stadium
15:00		Report		Attendance: 2,820; Referee: Euan Anderson

28 September 2019 7	Inverness Caledonian Thistle	1 – 3	Partick Thistle	Caledonian Stadium
15:00	White 21'	Report	Zanatta 10'; Miller 46'; Palmer 82'	Attendance: 2,469; Referee: Don Robertson

5 October 2019 8	Partick Thistle	0 – 1	Queen of the South	Firhill Stadium
15:00		Report	Brownlie 60'	Attendance: 2,910; Referee: Andrew Dallas

19 October 2019 9	Dundee	1 – 3	Partick Thistle	Dens Park
15:00	McGowan 25'	Report	Miller 85'; Gordon 88'; Mansell 91'	Attendance: 5,010; Referee: David Munro

26 October 2019 10	Partick Thistle	1 – 3	Arbroath	Firhill Stadium
15:00	Bannigan 59'	Report	Donnelly 37'; McKenna 74'; Hamilton 77'	Attendance: 2,793; Referee: Gavin Ross

29 October 2019 11	Dundee United	1 – 0	Partick Thistle	Tannadice Park
19:45	Shankland 62'	Report		Attendance: 6,929; Referee: Greg Aitken

2 November 2019 12	Ayr United	4 – 1	Partick Thistle	Somerset Park
15:00	Moore 11', 48'; Moffat 18'; Forrest 52'	Report	Cardle 79'	Attendance: 2,558; Referee: Willie Collum

9 November 2019 13	Partick Thistle	2 – 1	Greenock Morton	Firhill Stadium
15:00	Bannigan (red card) 53'; Gordon 59', 66'	Report	Baird 61'	Attendance: 2,751; Referee: Bobby Madden

26 November 2019 14	Partick Thistle	1 – 1	Alloa Athletic	Firhill Stadium
19:45	Zanatta 38'	Report	Trouten 15'	Attendance: 1,714; Referee: David Munro

30 November 2019 15	Dunfermline Athletic	5 – 1	Partick Thistle	East End Park
15:00	Nesibit 38', 22', 31', 49'; Martin 10'	Report	Cole 74'	Attendance: 3, 948; Referee: Mike Roncone

7 December 2019 16	Queen of the South	1 – 2	Partick Thistle	Palmerston Park
15:00	Murray 20'	Report	Cardle 70'; Cole 85'	Attendance: 1, 314; Referee: Steven McLean

14 December 2019 17	Partick Thistle	3 – 1	Inverness Caledonian Thistle	Firhill Stadium
15:00	Jones 48'; Saunders 64'; Zanatta 93'	Report	Keatings 57'	Attendance: 2,144; Referee: Steven McLean

21 December 2019 18	Partick Thistle	0 – 1	Dundee	Firhill Stadium
15:00		Report	McGowan 31'	Attendance: 2,957; Referee: Bobby Madden

28 December 2019 19	Greenock Morton	1 – 2	Partick Thistle	Cappielow Park
15:00	Jacobs 30'	Report	Jones 5'; O'Ware 61'	Attendance: 2,742; Referee: Craig Napier

4 January 2020 20	Alloa Athletic	1 – 1	Partick Thistle	Recreation Park
15:00	Brown 62'	Report	Bannigan 74'	Attendance: 1, 827; Referee: David Munro

11 January 2020 21	Partick Thistle	1 – 4	Dundee United	Firhill Stadium
15:00	Miller 87'	Report	Shankland 38', 60', 65'; Sporle 45'	Attendance: 4, 101; Referee: Willie Collum

25 January 2020 22	Arbroath	2 – 1	Partick Thistle	Gayfield Park
15:00	McKenna 6'; Wighton 34'; Virtanen (yellow card) 90+4'	Report	Graham 90+5'	Attendance: 1,418; Referee: David Lowe

31 January 2020 23	Partick Thistle	1 – 1	Ayr United	Firhill Stadium
19:05	Graham 33' (yellow card) 38'; O'Connor (yellow card) 52'; Cardle (yellow card) 61'	Report	Harvie (yellow card) 25'; Forrest 52' (pen.); Muirhead (yellow card) 60'; Docherty (yellow card) 84'	Attendance: 2,416; Referee: Euan Anderson

8 February 2020 24	Dundee	2 – 0	Partick Thistle	Dens Park
15:00	Byrne (yellow card) 33'; Hemmings 23' 34'; McGowan (yellow card) 42'; Nelson (yellow card) 89'	Report	Graham (yellow card) 26'; Cole (yellow card) 90+7'	Attendance: 4,816; Referee: Collin Steven

3 March 2020 25	Partick Thistle	0 – 0	Queen of the South	Firhill Stadium
19:45	Bannigan (yellow card) 90+3'; Cole (yellow card) 90+3'	Report	Pybus (yellow card) 88'	Attendance: 2,122; Referee: David Lowe

7 March 2020 26	Dundee United	1 – 1	Partick Thistle	Tannadice Park
15:00	Powers 19'; Watson (yellow card) 52'; Reynolds (yellow card) 76'	Report	Bannigan 52' (pen.); Mayo (yellow card) 72'; Graham (yellow card) 82'	Attendance: 7,603; Referee: Mike Roncone

10 March 2020 27	Partick Thistle	1 – 1	Dunfermline Athletic	Firhill Stadium
19:45	Graham 90+4'	Report	Beadling (yellow card) 61'; Devine (yellow card) 69'; Murray 72'	Attendance: 2,078; Referee: Steven Kirkland

=== Scottish League Cup ===
==== Group stage ====
13 July 2019 Group F	Partick Thistle	1 – 0	Airdrieonians	Firhill Stadium
15:00	Crighton 66' (o.g.)	Report		Attendance: 2,241; Referee: Grant Irvine

16 July 2019 Group F	Queen's Park	1 – 2	Partick Thistle	Excelsior Stadium
19:45	Kouider-Aïssa 56'	Report	Miller 6'; Robson 36'	Attendance: 944; Referee: David Dickinson

20 July 2019 Group F	Hamilton Academical	2 – 2 (6–5 p)	Partick Thistle	New Douglas Park
15:00	Cunningham 17', 54'	Report	Williamson 16'; Gordon 73'	Attendance: 1,693; Referee: John Beaton
	Penalties
	Oakley (penalty scored); Cunningham (penalty scored); McKenna (penalty scored); Gogić (penalty scored); Smith (penalty scored); McMann (penalty scored)		(penalty scored) Bannigan; (penalty scored) Gordon; (penalty scored) Miller; (penalty scored) Mansell; (penalty scored) Jones; (penalty missed) De Vita

24 July 2019 Group F	Partick Thistle	3 – 2	Clyde	Firhill Stadium
19:45	Gordon 12', 60'; Miller 49'	Report	Wallace 25'; Bannigan 65' (o.g.)	Attendance: 2,403; Referee: Kevin Graham

==== Knockout round ====
17 August 2019 Second round	Partick Thistle	3 – 2 (a.e.t.)	Ross County	Firhill Stadium
15:00	Miller 80'; Penrice 96'; Saunders 114'	Report	Spittal 60'; Paton 105'	Attendance: 2,053; Referee: Steven McLean

25 September 2019 Quarter-finals	Celtic	5 – 0	Partick Thistle	Celtic Park
19:45	Bayo 15'; Rogic 46'; Ntcham 56', 63'; Sinclair 76'	Report		Attendance: 25,008; Referee: Steven McLean

=== Scottish Challenge Cup ===
7 September 2019 Third round	Montrose	0 – 2	Partick Thistle	Links Park
15:00		Report	Cardle 2'; Miller 53'	Attendance: 861; Referee: Craig Nappier

12 October 2019 Fourth round	Partick Thistle	2 – 0	(Wales) Connah's Quay Nomads	Firhill Stadium
17:15	De Vita 34'; Penrice 77'	Report		Attendance: 1,380
Note: Game televised on S4C

16 November 2019 Quarter-Finals	Stenhousemuir	1 – 4	Partick Thistle	Ochilview Park
15:00	Hopkirk 68'		Cole 34'; Harkins 70'; Slater 79'; Miller 86'	Attendance: 1,244

14 February 2020 Semi-Finals	Partick Thistle	1 – 2	Raith Rovers	Firhill Stadium
19:45	Mansell 83'	Report	Benedictus 31'; Hendry 74'	Attendance: 2,196; Referee: Alan Newlands
Note: Game televised on BBC Alba

=== Scottish Cup ===
23 November 2019 Third round	Partick Thistle	1 – 0	Penicuik Athletic	Firhill Stadium
15:00	Cole 1'	Report		Attendance: 3,165; Referee: Mike Roncone

18 January 2020 Fourth round	Partick Thistle	1 – 2	Celtic	Firhill Stadium
17:30	Bannigan 90+3'	Report	Griffiths 12'; McGregor 78'	Attendance: 9,542; Referee: Alan Muir

=== Glasgow Cup ===
27 August 2019 Group stage	Rangers Colts	0 – 2	Partick Thistle	Dumbarton Football Stadium
19:30

1 October 2019 Group stage	Partick Thistle	2 – 1	Queen's Park	Firhill Stadium
19:45

3 December 2019 Group stage	Partick Thistle	9 – 1	Clyde	Firhill Stadium
19:00		Report

17 December 2019 Group stage	Celtic Colts	1 – 1	Partick Thistle	Dumbarton Football Stadium
19:00

21 January 2020 Group stage	Partick Thistle	1 – 2	Rangers Colts	Firhill Stadium
19:00

5 February 2020 Group stage	Queen's Park	1 – 1	Partick Thistle	Lesser Hampden
19:30

18 February 2020 Group stage	Clyde	3 – 1	Partick Thistle	Broadwood Stadium
20:15		Report

== Squad statistics ==
=== Appearances ===
No.	Pos	Nat	Player	Total		Championship		Scottish Cup		League Cup		Challenge Cup	
No.	Pos	Nat	Player	Apps	Goals	Apps	Goals	Apps	Goals	Apps	Goals	Apps	Goals
1	GK	(Scotland) SCO	Jamie Sneddon	8	0	6	0	0	0	2	0	0	0
2	DF	(Scotland) SCO	Ryan Williamson	25	1	15	0	1	0	6	1	3	0
3	DF	(Scotland) SCO	James Penrice	36	2	25	0	2	0	5	1	4	1
4	DF	(Scotland) SCO	Tam O'Ware	30	1	19	1	2	0	5	0	4	0
5	DF	(Scotland) SCO	Darren Brownlie	4	0	4	0	0	0	0	0	0	0
6	DF	(Scotland) SCO	Lewis Mayo	2	0	2	0	0	0	0	0	0	0
7	MF	(England) ENG	Joe Cardle	32	4	22	3	0	0	6	0	4	1
8	MF	(Scotland) SCO	Stuart Bannigan	33	5	24	4	1	1	6	0	2	0
9	FW	(Scotland) SCO	Brian Graham	6	2	5	2	0	0	0	0	1	0
10	FW	(England) ENG	Alex Jones	17	2	12	2	0	0	4	0	1	0
12	MF	(England) ENG	Reece Cole	24	4	18	2	2	1	1	0	3	1
14	MF	(Northern Ireland) NIR	Shea Gordon	22	7	15	4	0	0	6	3	1	0
15	DF	(England) ENG	Thomas Robson	27	1	15	0	2	0	6	1	4	0
16	MF	(Scotland) SCO	Darian MacKinnon	3	0	2	0	1	0	0	0	0	0
18	FW	(England) ENG	Lewis Mansell	21	2	12	1	0	0	6	0	3	1
19	FW	(Canada) CAN	Dario Zanatta	28	4	22	3	2	0	3	0	1	1
20	MF	(Scotland) SCO	Jamie Barjonas	5	0	5	0	0	0	0	0	0	0
21	DF	(Republic of Ireland) IRL	Lee O'Connor	5	0	4	0	0	0	0	0	1	0
22	GK	(Scotland) SCO	Scott Fox	30	0	20	0	2	0	4	0	4	0
23	FW	(Scotland) SCO	Zak Rudden	4	0	3	0	1	0	0	0	0	0
30	MF	(Senegal) SEN	Mouhamed Niang	1	0	0	0	0	0	0	0	1	0
32	FW	(Scotland) SCO	Evan Golasso	1	0	0	0	0	0	1	0	0	0
33	GK	(Scotland) SCO	Luke Scullion	0	0	0	0	0	0	0	0	0	0
35	MF	(Scotland) SCO	Dean Watson	0	0	0	0	0	0	0	0	0	0
43	DF	(Scotland) SCO	Steven Saunders	24	3	16	2	2	0	4	1	2	0
77	FW	(Australia) AUS	Mitch Austin	2	0	1	0	0	0	0	0	1	0
Players who left the club during the 2019–20 season
5	DF	(Northern Ireland) NIR	Ben Hall	5	0	2	0	1	0	0	0	2	0
6	DF	(Republic of Ireland) IRL	Sean McGinty	28	0	19	0	1	0	6	0	2	0
9	FW	(Scotland) SCO	Kenny Miller	32	9	21	5	2	0	6	3	3	1
11	MF	(Scotland) SCO	Gary Harkins	12	1	9	0	2	0	0	0	1	1
16	MF	(Northern Ireland) NIR	Cammy Palmer	20	0	13	0	0	0	6	0	1	0
17	MF	(Scotland) SCO	Craig Slater	10	1	6	0	2	0	0	0	2	1
20	MF	(Scotland) SCO	Callum Wilson	1	0	0	0	0	0	1	0	0	0
23	MF	(Italy) ITA	Raffaele De Vita	16	2	9	1	0	0	4	0	3	1
24	MF	(Sierra Leone) SLE	Osman Kakay	13	0	11	0	1	0	0	0	1	0

== Club statistics ==
=== League table ===
Pos	Team	Pld	W	D	L	GF	GA	GD	Pts	PPG	Promotion, qualification or relegation (Note: All play-off matches were cancelled, as clubs voted to curtail the season due to the COVID-19 pandemic in Scotland.)
6	Dunfermline Athletic	28	10	7	11	41	36	+5	37	1.32	
7	Greenock Morton	28	10	6	12	45	52	−7	36	1.29	
8	Alloa Athletic	28	7	10	11	33	43	−10	31	1.11	
9	Queen of the South	28	7	7	14	28	40	−12	28	1.00	
10	Partick Thistle (R)	27	6	8	13	32	47	−15	26	0.96	Relegation to League One

Source: SPFL
Rules for classification: 1) Points per game.
(R) Relegated

=== League Cup table ===
Pos	Team	Pld	W	PW	PL	L	GF	GA	GD	Pts	Qualification	PAR	HAM	AIR	QPA	CLY
1	Partick Thistle	4	3	0	1	0	8	5	+3	10	Qualification for the Second Round	—	—	1–0	—	3–2
2	Hamilton Academical	4	2	1	1	0	8	5	+3	9	Qualification for the Second Round	p2–2	—	—	0–0p	—
3	Airdrieonians	4	1	1	0	2	7	8	−1	5		—	2–3	—	p2–2	—
4	Queen's Park	4	0	2	1	1	4	5	−1	5		1–2	—	—	—	p1–1
5	Clyde	4	0	0	1	3	6	10	−4	1		—	1–3	2–3	—	—

Rules for classification: 1) goal difference, 2) goals scored, 3) away goals scored, 4) matches won, 5) away matches won, 6) drawing of lots.

== Transfers ==
=== In ===
Date	Position	Nationality	Name	From	Fee
15 May 2019	MF	(Northern Ireland)	Shea Gordon	Motherwell	Free
15 May 2019	DF	(Scotland)	Ryan Williamson	Dunfermline Athletic	Free
14 June 2019	MF	(England)	Lewis Mansell	Blackburn Rovers	Free
21 June 2019	DF	(England)	Thomas Robson	Falkirk	Free
26 June 2019	FW	(Scotland)	Kenny Miller	Dundee	Free
1 July 2019	GK	(Scotland)	Scott Fox	Ross County	Free
13 July 2019	FW	(England)	Alex Jones	Bradford City	Free
24 July 2019	FW	(Australia)	Mitch Austin	Sydney FC	Free
26 August 2019	DF	(Northern Ireland)	Ben Hall	Brighton & Hove Albion	Free
27 August 2019	FW	(Canada)	Dario Zanatta	Heart of Midlothian	Free
13 January 2020	MF	(Scotland)	Darian MacKinnon	Hamilton Academical	Free
15 January 2020	FW	(Scotland)	Zak Rudden	Rangers	Undisclosed
23 January 2020	FW	(Scotland)	Brian Graham	Ross County	Free
27 January 2020	DF	(Scotland)	Darren Brownlie	Queen of the South	Undisclosed
27 January 2020	FW	(Scotland)	Blair Lyons	Montrose	Undisclosed

=== Out ===
Date	Position	Nationality	Name	From	Fee
8 May 2019	FW	(Australia)	Scott McDonald	Western United	Free
9 May 2019	DF	(Republic of Ireland)	Niall Keown	Retired	Free
14 May 2019	DF	(England)	Christie Elliott	Carlisle United	Free
27 May 2019	FW	(Ivory Coast)	Souleymane Coulibaly	Étoile Sportive du Sahel	Free
4 June 2019	MF	(Scotland)	Blair Spittal	Ross County	Free
10 June 2019	FW	(Scotland)	Ally Roy	Airdrieonians	Free
20 June 2019	GK	(Scotland)	Cammy Bell	Falkirk	Free
24 June 2019	FW	(Scotland)	Kris Doolan	Ayr United	Free
5 July 2019	MF	(Scotland)	Aidan Fitzpatrick	Norwich City	£350,000
6 July 2019	GK	(Australia)	Aaron Lennox	Montrose	Free
12 July 2019	MF	(Scotland)	Andrew McCarthy	Queen of the South	Free
3 August 2019	FW	(England)	Miles Storey	Inverness CT	Free
8 January 2020	DF	(Northern Ireland)	Ben Hall	Falkirk	Free
16 February 2020	MF	(Scotland)	Callum Wilson	Dumbarton	Free
23 January 2020	FW	(Scotland)	Kenny Miller	Retired	Free
29 January 2020	MF	(Scotland)	Craig Slater	Queen's Park	Free
29 January 2020	DF	(Republic of Ireland)	Sean McGinty	Greenock Morton	Free
7 February 2020	MF	(Scotland)	Gary Harkins	Stenhousemuir	Free

=== Loans in ===
Date	Position	Nationality	Name	From	Fee
10 July 2019	MF	(Northern Ireland)	Cammy Palmer	Rangers	Loan
18 July 2019	MF	(Italy)	Raffaele De Vita	Livingston	Loan
2 September 2019	MF	(England)	Reece Cole	Brentford	Loan
2 September 2019	DF	(Sierra Leone)	Osman Kakay	Queens Park Rangers	Loan
20 January 2020	MF	(Scotland)	Jamie Barjonas	Rangers	Loan
21 January 2020	DF	(Republic of Ireland)	Lee O'Connor	Celtic	Loan
31 January 2020	DF	(Scotland)	Lewis Mayo	Rangers	Loan

=== Loans out ===
Date	Position	Nationality	Name	From	Fee
27 January 2020	FW	(Scotland)	Blair Lyons	Montrose	Loan

== See also ==
- List of Partick Thistle F.C. seasons
