= 2015–16 Dunfermline Athletic F.C. season =

Dunfermline Athletic
2015–16 season
- Chairman: Bob Garmory
- Manager: Allan Johnston
- Stadium: East End Park
- League One: Winners
- Challenge Cup: Quarter-final, lost to St Mirren
- League Cup: Third round, lost to Dundee United
- Scottish Cup: Fourth round, lost to Ross County
- Top goalscorer: League: Faissal El Bakhtaoui (22); All: Faissal El Bakhtaoui (30)
- Highest home attendance: League: 6,236 vs. Peterhead, (30 April 2016); Cup: 3,806 vs. Dundee, (25 August 2015)
- Lowest home attendance: League: 2,361 vs. Brechin City, (5 December 2015); Cup: 2,756 vs. Cowdenbeath, (1 August 2015)
- Average home league attendance: 3,496
Home colours	Away colours
- All statistics correct as of 1 May 2016.

The 2015–16 season was Dunfermline Athletic's third and final season in the Scottish League One, having been relegated from the Scottish First Division at the end of the 2012–13 season. In addition to the league, Dunfermline Athletic also competed in the Challenge Cup, League Cup and the Scottish Cup, where they were knocked out by St Mirren, Dundee United and Ross County respectively. The club won the league on 26 March with five matches to spare, after defeating Brechin City 3–1 at East End Park. This, together with bottom side and Fife rivals Cowdenbeath unexpectedly beating the Pars nearest rivals Peterhead 1–0, saw Dunfermline return to the second tier for the first time since 2013.

== Season review ==
=== May ===
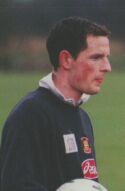
Johnston in 1998, whilst training with then club Sunderland.

- 8 May 2015: Allan Johnston is appointed as the new manager of Dunfermline, after it was announced that John Potter would step down from his position in charge of the first-team after the final league match against Airdrieonians and return to his previous position as a coach.
- 14 May 2015: The club announced that eighteen of the clubs squad were to be released after The Pars' failure to achieve promotion to the Scottish Championship. Among those released were vice-captain Gregor Buchanan, long-serving midfielder Ryan Thomson and full back Ross Millen. Manager Allan Johnston stated that he felt it was important to "freshen up the squad" after the disappointing campaign of the previous season.
- 26 May 2015: It was announced that after 10 years the Purvis Group would cease to be the club's main shirt sponsor, with a new sponsor to be announced before the start of the 2015–16 season. In recognition of the support provided and in order to continue the relationship which had lasted over a decade, The Pars stated that the Purvis Group would become their first ever "club sponsor", with the new sponsorship arrangement covering a range of areas such as advertising and assistance with stadium maintenance.
- 27 May 2015: Manager Allan Johnston appoints Albion Rovers assistant manager Sandy Clark to be his number two, marking the third time that Clark has signed with the club.

=== June ===
- 8 June 2015: Manager Allan Johnston makes the first signing of his tenure by bringing in Livingston captain Jason Talbot on a one-year contract. Of the move, Talbot noted that although he had moved down a division, he was looking forward to a "new challenge" with the Pars.
- 15 June 2015: Dunfermline make their second signing of the summer and their second signing from Livingston, bringing in centre back Callum Fordyce.
- 18 June 2015: English defender Ben Richards-Everton becomes the club's third signing under Allan Johnston, joining from Scottish Premiership side Partick Thistle. Additionally, the side returned to pre-season training.
- 28 June 2015: Former Aberdeen and Queen of the South player Michael Paton signs for The Pars. Paton, a winger, previously worked with manager Allan Johnston at Queen of the South.
- 29 June 2015: Dunfermline are drawn against Arbroath in the first round of the Scottish Challenge Cup, with the tie due to be played at Gayfield Park on the 25th of July.

=== July ===
- 2 July 2015: The club announce that SRJ Windows will be the new shirt sponsor, after agreeing a three-year deal with the business. This was seen as a continuation of the relationship which saw SRJ Windows constructing the clubs' "state-of-the-art dugouts", as well as having carried out other work around East End Park.
- 4 July 2015: The Pars' first pre-season match takes place against East Fife at Bayview Stadium. The side defeat The Fifers by three goals to nil, with the East Fife team being made up of five players who were signed with Dunfermline Athletic during the previous season. One of the scorers, Joe Cardle, appeared as a trialist having previously played for Dunfermline before being released during the financial difficulties two years previous.
- 6 July 2015: The side are drawn against local rivals Cowdenbeath in the first round of the Scottish League Cup, with the tie due to be played at East End Park on the 1st of August.
- 13 July 2015: Goalkeeper David Hutton is added to Dunfermline's roster, after appearing as a trialist in three matches for The Pars against East Fife, Partick Thistle and Livingston, successfully keeping a clean sheet in all three appearances. Manager Allan Johnston noted of the signing that Hutton should not expect to be first choice, as he was looking to sign another keeper, stating "It will be up to both [of] them to compete for the number one jersey, whoever is playing best will keep their place."
- 17 July 2015: Former Pars players Joe Cardle and Sean Murdoch agree to return to East End Park. Murdoch previously played for Dunfermline before joining Hamilton in 2008. Cardle was one of the first players released by the club in March 2013, after Dunfermline suffered a financial crisis.
- 25 July 2015: The first competitive match of the campaign saw Dunfermline defeat Scottish League Two side Arbroath 4–1 in the Scottish Challenge Cup, with Faissal El Bakhtaoui scoring the first of four consecutive braces in competitive matches.

=== August ===
- 1 August 2015: Dunfermline's first competitive home match of the season ended in a triumphant 5–1 victory over local rivals Cowdenbeath in the first round of the Scottish League Cup.
- 3 August 2015: After defeating Cowdenbeath in the first round, the Pars are drawn at home against Scottish Premiership side Dundee in the second round of the Scottish League Cup. Dundee's last visit to East End Park was during the 2010–11 season, with the result being a nil all draw.
- 18 August 2015: Defender Ryan Williamson suffers a double leg break in the closing minutes of the Scottish Challenge Cup tie against Forfar Athletic, after a collision with Forfar player Michael Dunlop.
- 20 August 2015: Following the victory over league rivals Forfar Athletic in the previous round of the Scottish Challenge Cup, Dunfermline were then drawn against Scottish Championship side St Mirren, with the tie to be played at St Mirren Park.

=== September ===
- 3 September 2015: Former Queen's Park defender Shaun Rooney signs for the Pars after appearing as a trialist for the side against Stranraer.
- 5 September 2015: Dunfermline complete the signing of journeyman striker Mickaël Antoine-Curier after he was released by English League One side Burton Albion.
- 12 September 2015: Faissal El Bakhtaoui wins the Scottish League One player of the month award after scoring twelve goals in all competitions, including five in the league. Pars Captain Callum Fordyce becomes the second Dunfermline defender sidelined with a long-term injury, after a challenge by Ayr United loanee Craig Moore left Fordyce with a broken bone is his fibula and a dislocated ankle.
- 24 September 2015: Former St Mirren centre back Marc McAusland signs for Dunfermline, in an attempt by manager Allan Johnston to bolster the side's defensive options after injuries to Callum Fordyce and Ryan Williamson.

=== October ===
- 10 October 2015: The Pars incur a heavy 4–0 defeat away to Scottish Championship side St Mirren, crashing out at the quarter-final stage of the Scottish Challenge Cup. Of the loss, manager Allan Johnston called it a "bad performance", commenting that it was "a chance to get into a semi final, a massive opportunity but we let ourselves down."
- 17 October 2015: Having signed for Dunfermline in 2008 and progressed through the youth sides, midfielder Shaun Byrne makes his 100th club appearance in a 3–0 win away to Stranraer. Defender Ben Richards-Everton scores his first ever professional goal on what is his 24th birthday, winning the man of the match award in a game broadcast live by BBC Alba.
- 29 October 2015: The third round draw of the Scottish Cup sees Dunfermline drawn away to fellow League One title contenders Ayr United in what is billed by many as the "tie of the round".

=== November ===
Commemorative strip, replicating the 1995–96 away kit
- 2 November 2015: To commemorate the twentieth anniversary of club legend and captain Norrie McCathie's death, Dunfermline launched a number of initiatives which would take place in the month of his death, January. These included the league match on 2 January 2016 against Cowdenbeath, the only other professional club which McCathie signed a contract with; an exhibition, celebrating the player and his time with the club; and a one-off "commemorative strip", replicating the final strip McCathie wore in a match against St Mirren at Love Street before his death on 8 January 1996.
- 5 November 2015: Pars keeper Sean Murdoch is voted Scottish League One player of the month for October, after the keeping a clean sheet in all four league matches for that month.
- 14 November 2015: Following the 2–0 victory over Airdrieonians at the Excelsior Stadium, the Pars went 612 minutes without conceding a goal in the league, breaking the record for total consecutive club clean sheets in the league which had stood since the 1985–86 season. The last league goal conceded by Dunfermline was also against Airdrieonians at East End Park in September. Although a club record, it did not break the record for a single Dunfermline keeper, with Ian Westwater having not conceded a goal in 617 minutes during the 1985–86 season.
- 21 November 2015: After not conceding a goal in the league in 632 minutes, the side managed to surpass Ian Westwater's previously held record, which had stood for thirty years. Josh Mullin of Albion Rovers was the first player to score against the Pars in seven league matches, in a one all draw between the two teams.
- 28 November 2015: In the third round of the Scottish Cup, Dunfermline defeated league rivals Ayr United at Somerset Park by one goal to nil. In storm-like conditions, a goal from stand-in captain Andy Geggan was what separated the two sides after 90 minutes.

=== December ===
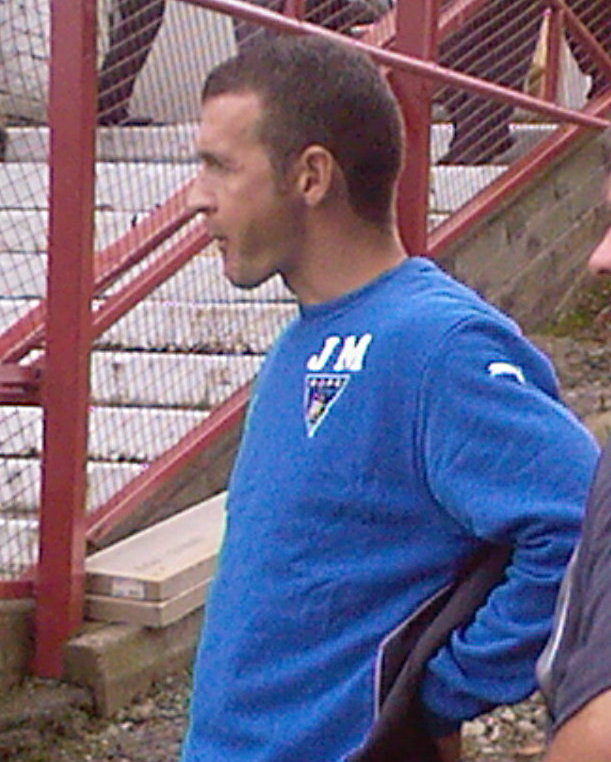
Former Pars manager Jim McIntyre, now in charge of Scottish Cup fourth round opponents Ross County.

- 1 December 2015: After defeating Ayr United in the previous round of the Scottish Cup, the Pars were drawn against Ross County, their third encounter of the season with a Scottish Premiership side, after matches against Dundee and Dundee United in the Scottish League Cup. Former Dunfermline manager Jim McIntyre, who managed the side for five years, returns to East End Park for the first time after being sacked in March 2012.
- 5 December 2015: Due to Ayr United's opponents Cowdenbeath taking part in a Scottish Cup third round replay, the Pars returned to the top of the table after defeating bottom side Brechin City. Goals from Faissal El Bakhtaoui, Michael Paton and David Hopkirk helped Dunermline to a 3–1 win at East End Park.
- 7 December 2015: The Scottish Disabled Supporters' Association (SDSA) recognised East End Park as being the most accessible football ground for disabled football supporters in Scotland. Managing Director Ross McArthur commented that the club were "delighted" to be recognised as the frontrunner in providing access to disabled supporters.
- 12 December 2015: The side defeated main rivals Ayr United at Somerset Park for the second time in two weeks in a 2–1 victory, putting them three points ahead of the Honest Men who had a game in-hand against Cowdenbeath. The Pars had to play for the majority of the second-half with only 10 players, after Joe Cardle was sent off for violent conduct for an incident with Peter Murphy.
- 17 December 2015: The club successfully appealed Cardle's sending off against Ayr United, after it was made clear that Cardle had not struck Ayr's Murphy as referee Andrew Dallas had initially perceived. This allowed Cardle to take part in the following match against Stenhousemuir.
- 26 December 2015: The Pars finished 2015 with a 4–2 win over Forfar Athletic at Station Park, extending their unbeaten run to thirteen league matches.

=== January ===
- 2 January 2016: The Pars defeat Fife derby rivals Cowdenbeath in a match which commemorated the 20th anniversary of the death of former captain Norrie McCathie. Two goals from Michael Moffat saw the side run out 2–1 winners in front of a season high attendance at East End Park.
- 8 January 2016: Defender Brad McKay is signed on loan from St Johnstone for the remainder of the season, bolstering the defence after Marc McAusland suffered an ankle injury against Cowdenbeath.
- 9 January 2016: Dunfermline were held in a two-all draw in the Scottish Cup fourth round against Scottish Premiership side Ross County, with goals from Faissal El Bakhtaoui and debutant Brad McKay cancelling out strikes from Alex Schalk and Brian Graham.
- 14 January 2016: Manager Allan Johnston is awarded the Scottish League One manager of the month trophy for the month of December after guiding the Pars to four out of four victories, leaving his side 9 points clear of second place Ayr United. Collecting the award, Johnston warned other teams that none of the playing squad, in particular Faissal El Bakhtaoui, were leaving East End Park. El Bakhtaoui had received a great deal of attention from other clubs based on his performances for the Pars.
- 29 January 2016: The side suffered their first league defeat in 15 league matches, losing 0–1 against Airdrieonians at East End Park, with Diamonds midfielder Jamie Bain scoring the only goal of the match.

=== February ===
- 2 February 2016: After Marc McAusland left the club during the January transfer window, Allan Johnston signed former Queen of the South and Motherwell defender Craig Reid until the end of the season.

=== March ===
- 26 March 2016: While Dunfermline defeated Brechin City 3–1 at East End Park, second-placed Peterhead surprisingly lost 0–1 at home to Cowdenbeath leaving the Pars with an unassailable 13 point lead which saw them become the first club to win one of the major English or Scottish championships in 2016, with top scorer Faissal El Bakhtaoui also netting the first hat-trick of his career.

=== April ===
- 1 April 2016: Former Kilmarnock midfielder Scott Robinson signed a short-term amateur contract with the Pars, after impressing during a trial period for the club.
- 5 April 2016: Manager Allan Johnston and top scorer Faissal El Bakhtaoui both win their respective monthly awards for the month of March, with the side picking up 13 out of a possible 15 points and El Bakhtaoui scoring 6 goals in 5 games.
- 7 April 2016: Goalkeepers Sean Murdoch & Cammy Gill and defender Ryan Williamson become the first three players of the championship winning side to commit their futures to Dunfermline, signing new contracts.
- 30 April 2016: The final match of the season saw Dunfermline take on their closest rivals for much of the second half of the season, Peterhead. Fan favourite Joe Cardle scored the only goal in a 1–0 victory for the league champions. At the end of the match, the Pars were presented with the league trophy, after finishing 18 points clear of second placed Ayr United.

== Squad list ==
As of 30 April 2016, the final match of the season

Name	Nationality	Position	Date of Birth (Age)	Signed From	Signed in	Signed until	Apps.	Goals
Goalkeepers
David Hutton	(Scotland)	GK	18 May 1985 (age 41)	Ayr United	2015	2016	2	0
Sean Murdoch	(Scotland)	GK	31 July 1986 (age 40)	(United States) Rochester Rhinos	2015	2016	51	0
Defenders
Callum Fordyce (c)	(Scotland)	DF	23 June 1992 (age 34)	Livingston	2015	2016	10	0
Lewis Martin	(Scotland)	DF	8 April 1996 (age 30)	Dunfermline Athletic youth teams	2012	2016	76	3
Brad McKay	(Scotland)	DF	26 March 1993 (age 33)	St Johnstone (loan)	2016	2016	17	3
Craig Reid	(Scotland)	DF	26 February 1986 (age 40)	Motherwell	2016	2016	13	0
Ben Richards-Everton	(England)	DF	17 October 1991 (age 35)	Partick Thistle	2015	2016	43	2
Shaun Rooney	(Scotland)	DF	26 July 1996 (age 30)	Queen's Park	2015	2016	13	1
Jason Talbot	(England)	DF	30 September 1985 (age 41)	Livingston	2015	2016	40	1
Ryan Williamson	(Scotland)	DF	14 March 1996 (age 30)	Dunfermline Athletic youth teams	2013	2016	48	0
Midfielders
Shaun Byrne	(Scotland)	MF	9 June 1993 (age 33)	Dunfermline Athletic youth teams	2012	2016	114	11
Joe Cardle	(England)	MF	7 February 1987 (age 39)	Ross County	2015	2016	173	39
Josh Falkingham	(England)	MF	25 August 1990 (age 36)	Arbroath	2012	2016	153	14
Andy Geggan (vc)	(Scotland)	MF	8 May 1987 (age 39)	Ayr United	2012	2016	157	28
Rhys McCabe	(Scotland)	MF	24 July 1992 (age 34)	(England) Sheffield Wednesday	2015	2016	18	2
Michael Paton	(Scotland)	MF	25 March 1989 (age 37)	Queen of the South	2015	2016	41	3
Scott Robinson	(Scotland)	MF	12 March 1992 (age 34)	Kilmarnock	2016	2016	2	0
Lewis Spence	(Scotland)	MF	28 January 1996 (age 30)	Dunfermline Athletic youth teams	2013	2016	39	1
Forwards
Faissal El Bakhtaoui	(France)	FW	8 November 1992 (age 34)	(France) Racing Club de la Baie	2012	2016	92	43
David Hopkirk	(Scotland)	FW	17 January 1993 (age 33)	Annan Athletic	2015	2016	47	5
Michael Moffat	(Scotland)	FW	15 February 1985 (age 41)	Ayr United	2014	2016	84	21
Ryan Wallace	(Scotland)	FW	30 July 1990 (age 36)	East Fife	2012	2016	119	35

== Results & fixtures ==
Win Draw Loss Postponed

=== Preseason ===
4 Jul 2015 Friendly	East Fife	0–3	Dunfermline Athletic	Bayview Stadium
13:00		Match report	Moffat 29'; Hopkirk 50'; Cardle (Note: Trialist) 76'	Referee: Allan

6 Jul 2015 Friendly	Berwick Rangers	2–2	Dunfermline Athletic	Shielfield Park
19:45	Lavery 35'; McKenna 58'	Match report	El Bakhtaoui 38'; Banjo 88' (o.g.)	Referee: Steven

8 Jul 2015 Closed Doors Friendly	Dunfermline Athletic	0–0	Partick Thistle	Garscube Sports Centre
14:00		Match report		Attendance: 0

11 Jul 2015 Friendly	Livingston	0–0	Dunfermline Athletic	Albyn Park
15:00		Match report		Referee: Cook

15 Jul 2015 Closed Doors Friendly	Queen's Park	2–5	Dunfermline Athletic	Lesser Hampden
19:30	11' (pen.); McLeish 45+1'	Match report	Falkingham 16'; Moffat 39'; Hooper (Note: Trialist) 41'; El Bakhtaoui 74'; Geggan 89'

18 Jul 2015 Friendly	Dunfermline Athletic	1–2	Hibernian	East End Park
15:00	Talbot (red card) 18'; El Bakhtaoui 85'	Match report	S. Allan 34'; Stevenson 51'	Attendance: 3,337; Referee: Walsh

=== Scottish League One ===
8 Aug 2015 Match 1	Brechin City	1–6	Dunfermline Athletic	Glebe Park
15:00	Weatherston 89'	SPFL Report	El Bakhtaoui 8', 44'; Moffat 23'; Cardle 31'; Wallace 80'; Falkingham 90'	Attendance: 1,214; Referee: McKendrick

15 Aug 2015 Match 2	Dunfermline Athletic	7–1	Cowdenbeath	East End Park
15:00	El Bakhtaoui 2', 8'; Moffat 13'; Cardle 32', 88'; Hopkirk 65'; Wallace 73'	SPFL Report	Johnston (red card) 59'	Attendance: 4,009; Referee: Aitken

22 Aug 2015 Match 3	Peterhead	2–1	Dunfermline Athletic	Balmoor Stadium
15:00	McAllister 30' (pen.); McIntosh 89'	SPFL Report	Moffat 44'	Attendance: 996; Referee: Charleston

29 Aug 2015 Match 4	Dunfermline Athletic	3–1	Stranraer	East End Park
15:00	El Bakhtaoui 14'; Talbot 22'; Geggan 51'	SPFL Report	Longworth 56'	Attendance: 3,330; Referee: Northcroft

5 Sept 2015 Match 5	Forfar Athletic	0–4	Dunfermline Athletic	Station Park
15:00		SPFL Report	Cardle 4', 45', 69'; Geggan 90+3'	Attendance: 1,618; Referee: Salmond

12 Sept 2015 Match 6	Dunfermline Athletic	0–2	Ayr United	East End Park
15:00		SPFL Report	Forrest 23'; Preston 59'	Attendance: 3,596; Referee: Graham

19 Sept 2015 Match 7	Stenhousemuir	0–5	Dunfermline Athletic	Ochilview Park
15:00		SPFL Report	Cardle 11'; El Bakhtaoui 24', 52'; Byrne 44'; Antoine-Curier 85'	Attendance: 1,554; Referee: Colvin

26 Sept 2015 Match 8	Dunfermline Athletic	1–1	Airdrieonians	East End Park
15:00	Moffat 74'	SPFL Report	Hunter 18'	Attendance: McKendrick; Referee: 3,391

3 Oct 2015 Match 9	Dunfermline Athletic	3–0	Albion Rovers	East End Park
15:00	Cardle 43'; McCabe 62'; El Bakhtaoui 75'	SPFL Report	Young (yellow card) 90+1' (red card)	Attendance: 3,086; Referee: Roncone

17 Oct 2015 Match 10	Stranraer	0–3	Dunfermline Athletic	Stair Park
17:15		SPFL Report	Moffat 4'; Richards-Everton 32'; Antoine-Curier 72'	Attendance: 667; Referee: Charleston

24 Oct 2015 Match 11	Dunfermline Athletic	4–0	Forfar Athletic	East End Park
15:00	Hopkirk 8'; Cardle 63'; Wallace 75', 84'	SPFL Report		Attendance: 3,198; Referee: Finnie

31 Oct 2015 Match 12	Cowdenbeath	0–0	Dunfermline Athletic	Central Park
15:00		SPFL Report		Attendance: 2,097; Referee: Walsh

7 Nov 2015 Match 13	Dunfermline Athletic	0–0	Peterhead	East End Park
15:00		SPFL Report		Attendance: 2,915; Referee: Ross

14 Nov 2015 Match 14	Airdrieonians	0–2	Dunfermline Athletic	Excelsior Stadium
15:00		SPFL Report	Moffat 7'; Byrne 54'	Attendance: 1,371; Referee: Colvin

21 Nov 2015 Match 15	Albion Rovers	1–1	Dunfermline Athletic	Cliftonhill
15:00	Mullin 20'	SPFL Report	Geggan 15'	Attendance: 1,041; Referee: Muir

5 Dec 2015 Match 16	Dunfermline Athletic	3–1	Brechin City	East End Park
15:00	El Bakhtaoui 34'; Paton 42'; Hopkirk 70'	SPFL Report	Layne 66'	Attendance: 2,361; Referee: Steven

12 Dec 2015 Match 17	Ayr United	1–2	Dunfermline Athletic	Somerset Park
15:00	McLauchlan 36'	Match report	Moffat 34'; Hopkirk 69'; Cardle (yellow card) 52' (red card)	Attendance: 2,076; Referee: Dallas

19 Dec 2015 Match 18	Dunfermline Athletic	1–0	Stenhousemuir	East End Park
15:00	Rooney 78'	SPFL Report		Attendance: 2,952; Referee: Salmond

26 Dec 2015 Match 19	Forfar Athletic	2–4	Dunfermline Athletic	Station Park
15:00	Campbell 41' (pen.); Travis 73'	SPFL Report	El Bakhtaoui 18', 49'; Cardle 60'; Wallace 79'	Attendance: 1,443; Referee: McKendrick

2 Jan 2016 Match 20	Dunfermline Athletic	2–1	Cowdenbeath	East End Park
15:00	Moffat 18', 65' (pen.)	SPFL Report	Spence 37'	Attendance: 5,641; Referee: Cook

16 Jan 2016	Dunfermline Athletic	P – P	Albion Rovers	East End Park
15:00		SPFL Report		Referee: Duncan
Note: _{Match postponed due to frozen pitch}

23 Jan 2016 Match 21	Peterhead	0–0	Dunfermline Athletic	Balmoor Stadium
15:00		SPFL Report		Attendance: 1,115; Referee: Allan

29 Jan 2016 Match 22	Dunfermline Athletic	0–1	Airdrieonians	East End Park
15:00		SPFL Report	Bain 30'	Attendance: Robertson; Referee: 2,545

6 Feb 2016 Match 23	Stenhousemuir	0–3	Dunfermline Athletic	Ochilview Park
15:00		SPFL Report	El Bakhtaoui 41'; Geggan 52', 78'	Attendance: 1,328; Referee: Lowe

13 Feb 2016 Match 24	Dunfermline Athletic	3–2	Ayr United	East End Park
15:00	Moffat 45+2' (pen.); Devlin 56' (o.g.); El Bakhtaoui 65'	SPFL Report	Graham 41'; Moore 44' (pen.); Gilmour (red card) 45+1'	Attendance: 3,319; Referee: Walsh

20 Feb 2016 Match 25	Brechin City	1–2	Dunfermline Athletic	Glebe Park
15:00	Thomson 17'	SPFL Report	Falkingham 6'; Richards-Everton 41'	Attendance: 1,053; Referee: Roncone

27 Feb 2016 Match 26	Dunfermline Athletic	6–1	Stranraer	East End Park
15:00	El Bakhtaoui 24', 54'; Cardle 42', 57', 73'; McKay 52'	SPFL Report	McGuigan 48'	Attendance: 3,016; Referee: Munro

5 Mar 2016 Match 27	Dunfermline Athletic	5–0	Stenhousemuir	East End Park
15:00	Fakingham 28'; Paton 31'; El Bakhtaoui 54'; Wallace 69', 79'	SPFL Report	McCabe (red card) 77'	Attendance: 3,017; Referee: Cook

8 Mar 2016 Match 28 ^{(Rearranged)}	Dunfermline Athletic	1–1	Albion Rovers	East End Park
19:45	Wallace 75'	SPFL Report	Davidson 77'	Attendance: 2,729; Referee: Duncan

12 Mar 2016 Match 29	Ayr United	0–2	Dunfermline Athletic	Somerset Park
15:00		Match report	El Bakhtaoui 62', 68'	Attendance: 2,190; Referee: Robertson

19 Mar 2016 Match 30	Cowdenbeath	0–1	Dunfermline Athletic	Central Park
15:00		SPFL Report	McCabe 81'	Attendance: 2,335; Referee: Finnie

26 Mar 2016 Match 31	Dunfermline Athletic	3–1	Brechin City	East End Park
	El Bakhtaoui 7', 24', 90+1'	SPFL Report	Thomson 25'	Attendance: 4,402; Referee: Kirkland

2 Apr 2016 Match 32	Albion Rovers	0–1	Dunfermline Athletic	Cliftonhill
15:00		SPFL Report	El Bakhtaoui 87'	Attendance: 1,413; Referee: Northcroft

9 Apr 2016 Match 33	Dunfermline Athletic	2–2	Forfar Athletic	East End Park
15:00	Moffat 30', 60'	SPFL Report	Swankie 13'; Ryan 50'; O'Brien (red card) 90+2'	Attendance: 3,201; Referee: Charleston

16 April 2016 Match 34	Stranraer	4–1	Dunfermline Athletic	Stair Park
15:00	McGuigan 49'; Malcolm 62', 85'; Stirling 68'	SPFL Report	McKay 35'	Attendance: 545; Referee: Allan

23 April 2016 Match 35	Airdrieonians	3–0	Dunfermline Athletic	Excelsior Stadium
15:00	Fitzpatrick 2'; Mackin 20'; Lister 27'	SPFL Report		Attendance: 1,131; Referee: McKendrick

30 Apr 2016 Match 36	Dunfermline Athletic	1–0	Peterhead	East End Park
15:00	Cardle 17'	SPFL Report		Attendance: 6,236; Referee: Beaton

=== Scottish Challenge Cup ===
25 Jul 2015 Challenge Cup round 1	Arbroath	1–4	Dunfermline Athletic	Gayfield Park
15:00	Grehan 72'	SPFL report	El Bakhtaoui 9', 28'; Moffat 20'; Wallace 62'	Attendance: 914; Referee: Walsh

18 Aug 2015 Challenge Cup round 2	Forfar Athletic	0–3	Dunfermline Athletic	Station Park
19:45	Nicholl (red card) 31'	SPFL Report	Moffat 32' (pen.) 82'; El Bakhtaoui 44'	Attendance: 1,027; Referee: Allan

10 Oct 2015 Challenge Cup Quarter-Final	St Mirren	4–0	Dunfermline Athletic	St Mirren Park
15:00	Gallagher 10'; Mallan 23', 88'; Agnew 37'	SPFL Report		Attendance: 2,339; Referee: Salmond

=== Scottish League Cup ===
1 Aug 2015 League Cup round 1	Dunfermline Athletic	5–1	Cowdenbeath	East End Park
15:00	El Bakhtaoui 49', 90'; Byrne 56', 78'; Wallace 74' (pen.)	SPFL report	Hughes 58'; Andrews (red card) 72'	Attendance: 2,756; Referee: Salmond

25 Aug 2015 League Cup round 2	Dunfermline Athletic	3–1	Dundee	East End Park
19:45	El Bakhtaoui 11', 90+4'; Cardle 86'	SPFL Report	Hemmings 48'	Attendance: 3,806; Referee: Finnie

22 Sept 2015 League Cup round 3	Dundee United	3–1 (a.e.t.)	Dunfermline Athletic	Tannadice Park
19:45	Morris 35'; Fraser 96'; Spittal 99'	SPFL Report	Paton 10'	Attendance: 5,174; Referee: Beaton

=== Scottish Cup ===
28 Nov 2015 Scottish Cup round 3	Ayr United	0–1	Dunfermline Athletic	Somerset Park
15:00		BBC Sport report	Geggan 22'	Attendance: 1,576; Referee: Clancy

9 Jan 2016 Scottish Cup round 4	Dunfermline Athletic	2–2	Ross County	East End Park
15:00	El Bakhtaoui 15'; McKay 56'	BBC Sport Report	Schalk 4'; Graham 27' (pen.)	Attendance: 3,439; Referee: Muir

12 Jan 2016 Scottish Cup round 4 replay	Ross County	1–0	Dunfermline Athletic	Victoria Park
19:45	De Vita 70'	BBC Sport Report		Attendance: 2,041; Referee: Muir

== Squad statistics ==
=== Starting XI ===

Most frequent starting line-up uses the team's most used formation: 4–4–2. The players used are those who have played the most games in each respective position, not necessarily who have played most games out of all the players.

=== Captains ===
No.	P	Name	Country	No. games	Notes
	MF	Andy Geggan	(Scotland)	28	Stand in captain, due to Callum Fordyce's injury
	DF	Callum Fordyce	(Scotland)	10	Club Captain
	MF	Josh Falkingham	(England)	6	
	GK	Sean Murdoch	(Scotland)	1	

Last updated: 1 May 2016
Source: Competitive match reports.
Competitive matches only
Matches started as captain only
Country: FIFA nationality; No.: Squad number; P: Position; Name: Player name; No. Games: Number of games started as captain.

=== Appearances and goals ===
During the 2015–16 season, Dunfermline used twenty-seven different players over forty-five competitive matches. The table below shows the number of appearances and goals scored by each player. Goalkeeper Sean Murdoch, centre back Ben Richards-Everton and striker Michael Moffat made the most appearances, each playing in forty-three of a possible 45 matches. The top scorer for the season was French Moroccan striker Faissal El Bakhtaoui, who scored thirty times in 40 appearances. Fan favourite Joe Cardle scored two hat-tricks during the season – against Forfar Athletic and Stranraer, whilst El Bakhtaoui's final home start before departing the club saw him score a hat-trick against Brechin City.

As of 7 July 2016

No.	Pos	Nat	Player	Total		Scottish League One		Scottish Cup		League Cup		Challenge Cup	
No.	Pos	Nat	Player	Apps	Goals	Apps	Goals	Apps	Goals	Apps	Goals	Apps	Goals
	GK	(Scotland) SCO	Cammy Gill	0	0	0	0	0	0	0	0	0	0
	GK	(Scotland) SCO	David Hutton	2	0	2	0	0	0	0	0	0	0
	GK	(Scotland) SCO	Sean Murdoch	43	0	34	0	3	0	3	0	3	0
	DF	(Scotland) SCO	Callum Fordyce	10	0	6	0	0	0	2	0	2	0
	DF	(Scotland) SCO	Lewis Martin	24	0	18	0	1	0	3	0	2	0
	DF	(Scotland) SCO	Brad McKay	17	3	15	2	2	1	0	0	0	0
	DF	(Scotland) SCO	John Potter	0	0	0	0	0	0	0	0	0	0
	DF	(Scotland) SCO	Craig Reid	13	0	11+2	0	0	0	0	0	0	0
	DF	(England) ENG	Ben Richards-Everton	43	2	34	2	3	0	3	0	3	0
	DF	(Scotland) SCO	Shaun Rooney	13	1	7+3	1	2	0	0	0	1	0
	DF	(England) ENG	Jason Talbot	41	1	34+1	1	3	0	2	0	1	0
	DF	(Scotland) SCO	Ryan Williamson	9	0	5+1	0	0	0	1	0	2	0
	MF	(Scotland) SCO	Shaun Byrne	27	4	14+8	2	0	0	2	2	3	0
	MF	(England) ENG	Joe Cardle	39	15	28+2	14	3	0	3	1	3	0
	MF	(Scotland) SCO	Conner Duthie	3	0	2+1	0	0	0	0	0	0	0
	MF	(England) ENG	Josh Falkingham	35	3	23+5	3	3	0	2+1	0	0+1	0
	MF	(Scotland) SCO	Andy Geggan	39	6	29+1	5	3	1	3	0	3	0
	MF	(Scotland) SCO	Evan Horne	0	0	0	0	0	0	0	0	0	0
	MF	(Scotland) SCO	Rhys McCabe	18	2	7+8	2	0+1	0	0+1	0	0+1	0
	MF	(Scotland) SCO	Michael Paton	40	3	29+2	2	3	0	3	1	3	0
	MF	(Scotland) SCO	Scott Robinson	2	0	2	0	0	0	0	0	0	0
	FW	(Scotland) SCO	PJ Crossan	2	0	0+2	0	0	0	0	0	0	0
	FW	(France) FRA	Faissal El Bakhtaoui	40	30	30+1	22	3	1	3	4	3	3
	FW	(Scotland) SCO	David Hopkirk	35	4	10+19	4	0+1	0	0+3	0	0+2	0
	FW	(Scotland) SCO	Michael Moffat	43	15	29+5	12	3	0	2+1	0	2+1	3
	FW	(Scotland) SCO	James Thomas	1	0	0	0	0	0	0	0	0+1	0
	FW	(Scotland) SCO	Ryan Wallace	42	10	12+23	8	0+1	0	1+2	1	1+2	1
Players away from the club on loan:
	MF	(Scotland) SCO	Lewis Spence	1	0	0	0	0	0	0	0	0+1	0
Players who appeared for Dunfermline Athletic but left during the season:
	DF	(Scotland) SCO	Marc McAusland	15	0	13	0	1	0	0	0	1	0
	FW	(Guadeloupe) GLP	Mickaël Antoine-Curier	9	2	1+8	2	0	0	0	0	0	0

=== Clean sheets ===
Dunfermline used two goalkeepers in all competitions during the 2015–16 season. The table below shows the total number of shutouts made, with 18 clean sheets having been kept in forty-five competitive matches.

Pos	Nat	Name	Total	Scottish League One	Scottish Cup	Scottish League Cup	Scottish Challenge Cup
GK	(Scotland)	Sean Murdoch	17	15	1		1
GK	(Scotland)	David Hutton	1	1			
		Totals	18	16	1	0	1

Last updated: 1 May 2016
Source: Match reports in Competitive matches

=== Goalscorers ===
As of match played 30 April 2016

Place	Position	Nation	Name	Total	Scottish League One	Scottish Cup	Scottish League Cup	Scottish Challenge Cup
1	FW	(France)	Faissal El Bakhtaoui	30	22	1	4	3
2	MF	(England)	Joe Cardle	15	14		1	
2	FW	(Scotland)	Michael Moffat	15	12			3
4	FW	(Scotland)	Ryan Wallace	10	8		1	1
5	MF	(Scotland)	Andy Geggan	6	5	1		
6	FW	(Scotland)	David Hopkirk	4	4			
6	MF	(Scotland)	Shaun Byrne	4	2		2	
8	MF	(England)	Josh Falkingham	3	3			
8	DF	(Scotland)	Brad McKay	3	2	1		
8	MF	(Scotland)	Michael Paton	3	2		1	
10	FW	(Guadeloupe)	Mickaël Antoine-Curier	2	2			
10	MF	(Scotland)	Rhys McCabe	2	2			
10	DF	(England)	Ben Richards-Everton	2	2			
14
14	DF	(Scotland)	Shaun Rooney	1	1			
14	DF	(England)	Jason Talbot	1	1			
14	—		Own goal	1	1			
Total				102	83	3	9	7

=== Assists ===
As of match played 30 April 2016

Place	Position	Nation	Name	Total	Scottish League One	Scottish Cup	Scottish League Cup	Scottish Challenge Cup
1	MF	(Scotland)	Michael Paton	18	12	1	3	2
2	FW	(Scotland)	Ryan Wallace	10	9		1	
2	MF	(England)	Joe Cardle	9	7		2	
4	FW	(France)	Faissal El Bakhtaoui	7	7			
5	FW	(Scotland)	Michael Moffat	7	6	1		
6	MF	(England)	Josh Falkingham	4	4			
6	MF	(Scotland)	Andy Geggan	4	3		1	
8	DF	(Scotland)	Lewis Martin	3	1		1	1
9	MF	(Scotland)	Shaun Byrne	2	2			
9	MF	(Scotland)	Rhys McCabe	2	2			
9	DF	(Scotland)	Ryan Williamson	2				2
12	FW	(Scotland)	PJ Crossan	1	1			
12	FW	(Scotland)	David Hopkirk	1	1			
12	DF	(Scotland)	Shaun Rooney	1	1			
12	DF	(Scotland)	Jason Talbot	1	1			
12	DF	(England)	Ben Richards-Everton	1				1

=== Disciplinary record ===
As of match played 30 April 2016

Position	Nation	Name	Total		Scottish League One		Scottish Cup		Scottish League Cup		Scottish Challenge Cup	
Position	Nation	Name	Yellow card	Red card	Yellow card	Red card	Yellow card	Red card	Yellow card	Red card	Yellow card	Red card
MF	(Scotland)	Andy Geggan	11		10				1			
MF	(Scotland)	Joe Cardle	9	(Note: Joe Cardle was sent off against Ayr United for violent conduct, however this was rescinded after the club successfully appealed referee Andrew Dallas' decision)	7				2			
DF	(England)	Ben Richards-Everton	8		6		2					
MF	(England)	Josh Falkingham	8		8							
DF	(England)	Jason Talbot	7		6		1					
FW	(France)	Faissal El Bakhtaoui	7		5		1		1			
DF	(Scotland)	Brad McKay	5		4		1					
FW	(Scotland)	Ryan Wallace	5		4						1	
MF	(Scotland)	Michael Moffat	3		2		1					
DF	(Scotland)	Shaun Rooney	3		2		1					
MF	(Scotland)	Michael Paton	3		2						1	
MF	(Scotland)	Shaun Byrne	2		2							
DF	(Scotland)	Callum Fordyce	2		2							
DF	(Scotland)	Lewis Martin	2		2							
DF	(Guadeloupe)	Mickaël Antoine-Curier	1		1							
MF	(Scotland)	Rhys McCabe	1		1							
DF	(Scotland)	Craig Reid	1		1							
FW	(Scotland)	David Hopkirk	1		1							
Total			79	0	66	0	7	0	4	0	2	0

== Club statistics ==
=== League table ===
Pos	Team	Pld	W	D	L	GF	GA	GD	Pts	Promotion, qualification or relegation
1	Dunfermline Athletic (C, P)	36	24	7	5	83	30	+53	79	Promotion to Scottish Championship
2	Ayr United (O, P)	36	19	4	13	65	47	+18	61	Qualification to Championship play-offs
3	Peterhead	36	16	11	9	72	47	+25	59	Qualification to Championship play-offs
4	Stranraer	36	15	6	15	43	49	−6	51	Qualification to Championship play-offs
5	Airdrieonians	36	14	7	15	48	50	−2	49	

Source: BBC Sport
Rules for classification: 1) Points; 2) Goal difference; 3) Number of goals scored
(C) Champions; (O) Play-off winners; (P) Promoted

==== Results by round ====
Round	1	2	3	4	5	6	7	8	9	10	11	12	13	14	15	16	17	18	19	20	21	22	23	24	25	26	27	28	29	30	31	32	33	34	35	36
Ground	A	H	A	H	A	H	A	H	H	A	H	A	H	A	A	H	A	H	A	H	A	H	A	H	A	H	H	H	A	A	H	A	H	A	A	H
Result	W	W	L	W	W	L	W	D	W	W	W	D	D	W	D	W	W	W	W	W	D	L	W	W	W	W	W	D	W	W	W	W	D	L	L	W
Position	1	1	3	2	1	3	2	2	2	1	1	2	2	2	2	1	1	1	1	1	1	1	1	1	1	1	1	1	1	1	1	1	1	1	1	1

Updated to match(es) played on 30 April 2016. Source: BBC Sport; DAFC.co.uk
A = Away; H = Home; W = Win; D = Draw; L = Loss

==== Results summary ====
Overall								Home						Away					
Pld	W	D	L	GF	GA	GD	Pts	W	D	L	GF	GA	GD	W	D	L	GF	GA	GD
36	24	7	5	83	30	+53	79	12	4	2	45	15	+30	12	3	3	38	15	+23

Last updated: 30 April 2016.
Source: SPFL

=== Home attendances ===
Win Draw Loss

Comp	Date	Score	Opponent	Attendance
League Cup	1 August 2015	5–1	Cowdenbeath	2,756
League One	15 August 2015	7–1	Cowdenbeath	4,009
League Cup	25 August 2015	3–1	Dundee	3,806
League One	29 August 2015	3–1	Stranraer	3,330
League One	12 September 2015	0–2	Ayr United	3,596
League One	26 September 2015	1–1	Airdrieonians	3,391
League One	3 October 2015	3–0	Albion Rovers	3,086
League One	24 October 2015	4–0	Forfar Athletic	3,198
League One	7 November 2015	0–0	Peterhead	2,915
League One	5 December 2015	3–1	Brechin City	2,361
League One	19 December 2015	1–0	Stenhousemuir	2,952
League One	2 January 2016	2–1	Cowdenbeath	5,641
Scottish Cup	9 January 2016	2–2	Ross County	3,439
League One	29 January 2016	0–1	Airdrieonians	2,545
League One	13 February 2016	3–2	Ayr United	3,319
League One	27 February 2016	6–1	Stranraer	3,016
League One	5 March 2016	5–0	Stenhousemuir	3,017
League One	8 March 2016	1–1	Albion Rovers	2,729
League One	26 March 2016	3–1	Brechin City	4,402
League One	9 April 2016	2–2	Forfar Athletic	3,201
League One	30 April 2016	1–0	Peterhead	6,236
			Total attendance:	72,845
			Average total attendance:	3,468
			Total league attendance:	62,944
			Average league attendance:	3,496

Last updated: 1 May 2016
Source: Match reports in Results

== Awards ==
=== Scottish League One Manager of the Month award ===
Month	Name
December	(Scotland) Allan Johnston
March	(Scotland) Allan Johnston

=== Scottish League One Player of the Month award ===
Month	Player
August	(France) Faissal El Bakhtaoui
October	(Scotland) Sean Murdoch
March	(France) Faissal El Bakhtaoui

=== End-of-season awards ===
==== PFA Scotland ====
Award	Player
PFA Scotland Scottish League One Player of the Year	(France) Faissal El Bakhtaoui
PFA Scotland Scottish League One Team of the Year	(England) Ben Richards-Everton, (Scotland) Andy Geggan, (England) Joe Cardle, (France) Faissal El Bakhtaoui

==== Club ====
Award	Player
Player's Player of the Year	(France) Faissal El Bakhtaoui
DAFC Player of the Year	(France) Faissal El Bakhtaoui
Centenary Club Lifeline Player of the Year	(France) Faissal El Bakhtaoui
Under 20 Player of the Year	(Scotland) Lewis Martin

== Transfers ==
=== First team ===
==== Players in ====
Date	Position	Nationality	Name	From	Fee	Ref.
8 June 2015	DF	(England)	Jason Talbot	Livingston	Free	
15 June 2015	DF	(Scotland)	Callum Fordyce	Livingston	Free	
18 June 2015	DF	(England)	Ben Richards-Everton	Partick Thistle	Free	
29 June 2015	FW	(Scotland)	Michael Paton	Queen of the South	Free	
13 July 2015	GK	(Scotland)	David Hutton	Ayr United	Free	
17 July 2015	GK	(Scotland)	Sean Murdoch	(United States) Rochester Rhinos	Free	
17 July 2015	MF	(England)	Joe Cardle	Ross County	Free	
3 September 2015	DF	(Scotland)	Shaun Rooney	Queen's Park	Free	
5 September 2015	FW	(Guadeloupe)	Mickaël Antoine-Curier	(England) Burton Albion	Free	
18 September 2015	MF	(Scotland)	Rhys McCabe	(England) Sheffield Wednesday	Free	
24 September 2015	DF	(Scotland)	Marc McAusland	St Mirren	Free	
2 February 2016	DF	(Scotland)	Craig Reid	Motherwell	Free	
1 April 2016	MF	(Scotland)	Scott Robinson	Kilmarnock	Free	

==== Players out ====
Date	Position	Nationality	Name	To	Fee	Ref.
30 April 2015	DF	(Scotland)	Jim Paterson	Stenhousemuir	Free	
30 April 2015	DF	(Scotland)	Stuart Urquhart	Free agent	Released	
30 April 2015	MF	(Republic of Ireland)	Paul George	(Northern Ireland) Cliftonville	Free	
13 May 2015	GK	(Scotland)	Ryan Goodfellow	East Fife	Free	
13 May 2015	DF	(Scotland)	Gregor Buchanan	Dumbarton	Free	
13 May 2015	DF	(Scotland)	Ross Millen	Livingston	Free	
13 May 2015	DF	(England)	Jonathan Page	East Fife	Free	
13 May 2015	MF	(Scotland)	Kyle McAusland	Alloa Athletic	Free	
13 May 2015	MF	(Scotland)	Andy Stirling	Stranraer	Free	
13 May 2015	MF	(Scotland)	Ryan Thomson	Stranraer	Free	
13 May 2015	MF	(England)	Alex Whittle	(England) AFC Fylde	Free	
13 May 2015	FW	(Scotland)	Andrew Barrowman	Albion Rovers	Free	
13 May 2015	FW	(Scotland)	Allan Smith	Stenhousemuir	Free	
22 January 2016	FW	(Guadeloupe)	Mickaël Antoine-Curier	(Belgium) Union SG	Free	
26 January 2016	DF	(Scotland)	Marc McAusland	(Iceland) Keflavík	Free	

==== Loans in ====
Date	Position	Nationality	Name	From	Duration	Ref.
8 January 2016	DF	(Scotland)	Brad McKay	St Johnstone	End of season	

==== Loans out ====
Date	Position	Nationality	Name	To	Duration	Ref.
12 January 2016	MF	(Scotland)	Lewis Spence	Brechin City	End of season	

=== Development squad ===
==== Players in ====
Date	Position	Nationality	Name	From	Fee	Ref.
21 January 2016	MF	(Scotland)	Evan Horne	Dundee United	Free	
23 March 2016	MF	(Scotland)	Conner Duthie	Hibernian	Free	

==== Players out ====
Date	Position	Nationality	Name	To	Fee	Ref.
13 May 2015	GK	(Scotland)	Jamie Wilson	Bonnyrigg Rose	Free	
13 May 2015	DF	(Scotland)	Scott Mercer	East Fife	Free	
13 May 2015	MF	(Scotland)	Finn Graham	(England) Berwick Rangers	Free	
13 May 2015	MF	(Scotland)	Declan O'Kane	East Fife	Free	
13 May 2015	FW	(Scotland)	Gavin McMillan	East Stirlingshire	Free	
