= Ben Richards-Everton =

English footballer (born 1991)

Personal information
- Full name: Benjamin Richards-Everton
- Date of birth: 17 October 1991 (age 35)
- Place of birth: Birmingham, England
- Height: 6 ft 5 in (1.96 m)
- Position: Defender

Team information
- Current team: Chippenham Town

Youth career
- –2008: Romulus
- 2008–2009: Carlisle United

Senior career*
Years	Team	Apps	(Gls)
2009–2010	Romulus		
2010–2011	Cradley Town		
2011–2013	Hinckley United	38	(0)
2011	→ Sutton Coldfield Town (loan)		
2011	→ Rushall Olympic (loan)		
2011	→ Romulus (loan)		
2013–2014	Tamworth	37	(0)
2014–2015	Partick Thistle	2	(0)
2014–2015	→ Airdrieonians (loan)	18	(0)
2015–2017	Dunfermline Athletic	40	(2)
2017–2019	Accrington Stanley	39	(1)
2019–2021	Bradford City	42	(2)
2021–2022	Barnet	62	(5)
2022–2023	Yeovil Town	19	(0)
2023	→ Scunthorpe United (loan)	12	(1)
2023–2024	Gloucester City	27	(0)
2024	Bromsgrove Sporting	9	(0)
2024–2026	Gloucester City	54	(6)
2026–	Chippenham Town	0	(0)

International career
2013	England C	1	(0)
- * Club domestic league appearances and goals as of 14:40, 5 August 2026 (UTC)

Benjamin Richards-Everton (born 17 October 1991) is an English professional footballer who plays as a central defender for Southern League Premier Division South club Chippenham Town.

Richards-Everton has previously played for English non-league clubs Romulus, Cradley Town, Hinckley United, Tamworth, Barnet, Yeovil Town and Scunthorpe United, as well as Scottish sides Partick Thistle, Airdrieonians and Dunfermline Athletic, and English League clubs Accrington Stanley and Bradford City.

== Club career ==
=== Early career ===
Born in Birmingham, West Midlands, Richards-Everton joined Hinckley United from Cradley Town, where he spent two seasons with The Knitters, spending time out on loan with Sutton Coldfield Town, Rushall Olympic and former club Romulus.

=== Tamworth ===
Being regarded as one of the best defenders in the league, he left Hinckley United in March 2013, to join Conference Premier side Tamworth. During December 2013, with continued good form, Richards-Everton attracted the attention of many higher English clubs. Tamworth were expected to sell the defender in January 2014 before his contract expired, but he stayed at the club until August 2014. Ben was tracked by a number of Football League and Premier League clubs, but on 22 August 2014, Richards-Everton signed for Partick Thistle, after impressing on a trial period earlier in the summer. He was immediately loaned to Scottish League One club Airdrieonians, making his debut on 23 August 2014, in a 3–0 defeat against Dunfermline Athletic.

=== Partick Thistle ===
On 21 March 2015, Richards-Everton made his debut for Partick Thistle, coming on as a 90th-minute substitute for Steven Lawless, the goalscorer in a 1–0 victory against Inverness Caley Thistle at Firhill Stadium. Richards-Everton made his first start for Partick Thistle in a 0–0 draw with Motherwell, playing the full 90 minutes.

=== Dunfermline Athletic ===
At the end of the 2014–15 season Richards-Everton was released by Thistle, and in June 2015 he signed a one-year contract with Dunfermline Athletic. Richards-Everton made his first appearance for the side in a 3–0 friendly victory over local rivals East Fife, whilst his first competitive start came against Arbroath in the Scottish Challenge Cup. His first league appearance was against Brechin City in a 6–1 win, and he scored his first ever senior goal, and his first for the Pars, in a win against league rivals Stranraer on his 24th birthday. Richards-Everton was a consistent starter for the Pars, playing in all but two of the Pars League One winning campaign.

The 2016–17 season began in much the same way as the previous, with Richards-Everton starting in nine of the Pars' first 10 league and cup matches. Due to the club's poor performance in the league he was dropped from the starting 11 until 22 October against Hibernian. However, although playing the full 90 minutes against Hibs, and being chosen as the man of the match, Richards-Everton suffered a severe injury to his knee which saw him miss the remainder the season. Ben choose to leave the Pars, putting his injury problems behind him, pursuing a career south of the border.

=== Accrington Stanley ===
After leaving Dunfermline Athletic, Richards-Everton returned to England, signing a one-year deal with EFL League Two club Accrington Stanley on 15 July 2017. He scored his first goal in a very impressive performance for Accrington in a 3-2 EFL Cup win against Preston North End on 8 August 2017. Richards-Everton was sustained a shoulder injury during a game against Notts County, only returning to face Blackpool. Richards-Everton returned to fine form scoring in an impressive individual performance against Crawley. Richards-Everton came off the bench on Boxing Day and scored with his first shot of the game against Crewe Alexandra. Accrington exercised a contractual option at the end of the 2017–18 season to retain him.

=== Bradford City ===
In May 2019 Richards-Everton joined Bradford City on a 2-year deal. He left the club on 11 January 2021, by mutual consent.

=== Barnet ===
On 13 January 2021, Richards-Everton signed for National League side Barnet on a deal until at least the end of the 2022-23 season, with an option for a further year. Richards-Everton left the club in May 2022 having come to a mutual agreement with the club to terminate his contract.

=== Yeovil Town ===
On 29 July 2022, Richards-Everton signed for National League club Yeovil Town on a one-year deal.

On 15 February 2023, he joined Scunthorpe United on loan until the end of the season.

At the end of the 2022–23 season, Richards-Everton was released by Yeovil following the club's relegation from the National League.

=== Gloucester City ===
On 31 July 2023, Richards-Everton signed for Gloucester City.

He signed for Bromsgrove Sporting in March 2024. In May 2024, Richards-Everton returned to Gloucester City following their relegation to the Southern Premier Division South. On 7 February 2026, Richards-Everton departed the club, subsequently retiring from football.

=== Chippenham Town ===
On 4 August 2026, Richards-Everton came out of retirement to join Chippenham Town.

== International career ==
In November 2013, Richards-Everton was called up to the England C squad, to face a Latvia under-23 side.

== Career statistics ==
As of match played 15 April 2023

Appearances and goals by club, season and competition
Club	Season	League			National Cup		League Cup		Other		Total	
Club	Season	Division	Apps	Goals	Apps	Goals	Apps	Goals	Apps	Goals	Apps	Goals
Hinckley United	2011–12	Conference North	17	0	0	0	—		0	0	17	0
Hinckley United	2012–13	Conference North	21	0	0	0	—		0	0	21	0
Hinckley United	Total		38	0	0	0	—		0	0	38	0
Tamworth	2013–14	Conference Premier	37	0	3	1	0	0	2 (Note: Appearances in the FA Trophy)	2	42	3
Tamworth	2014–15	Conference North	0	0	0	0	0	0	0	0	0	0
Tamworth	Total		37	0	3	1	0	0	2	2	42	3
Partick Thistle	2014–15	Scottish Premiership	2	0	0	0	0	0	0	0	2	0
Airdrieonians (loan)	2014–15	Scottish League One	18	0	0	0	0	0	0	0	18	0
Dunfermline Athletic	2015–16	Scottish League One	34	2	3	0	3	0	3 (Note: Appearances in the Scottish Challenge Cup)	0	43	2
Dunfermline Athletic	2016–17	Scottish Championship	6	0	0	0	4	0	0	0	10	0
Dunfermline Athletic	Total		40	2	3	0	7	0	3	0	53	2
Accrington Stanley	2017–18	League Two	22	1	2	0	3	1	2 (Note: Appearances in the EFL Trophy)	0	22	2
Accrington Stanley	2018–19	League One	17	0	4	0	0	0	5	0	26	0
Accrington Stanley	Total		39	1	6	0	3	1	7	0	55	2
Bradford City	2019–20	League Two	32	2	2	0	0	0	3	0	37	2
Bradford City	2020–21	League Two	10	0	1	0	1	0	2	0	14	0
Bradford City	Total		42	2	3	0	1	0	5	0	51	2
Barnet	2020–21	National League	23	1	0	0	0	0	0	0	23	1
Barnet	2021–22	National League	39	4	1	0	0	0	4 (Note: One appearance in the FA Trophy, three appearances in the Middlesex Senior Cup)	0	44	4
Barnet	Total		62	5	1	0	0	0	4	0	67	5
Yeovil Town	2022–23	National League	19	0	2	0	0	0	0	0	21	0
Scunthorpe United (loan)	2022–23	National League	12	1	0	0	0	0	0	0	12	1
Career total			299	11	18	1	11	1	21	2	350	15

== Honours ==
Dunfermline Athletic

- Scottish League One: 2015–16

Accrington Stanley

- EFL League Two: 2017–18
