= Ryan Williamson =

Scottish footballer (born 1996)

Personal information
- Full name: Ryan Williamson
- Date of birth: 14 March 1996 (age 30)
- Place of birth: Kirkcaldy, Scotland
- Position: Full back

Team information
- Current team: Montrose
- Number: 2

Youth career
- 2004–2008: Rothes Juniors Boys Club
- 2008–2010: Celtic
- 2010–2013: Dunfermline Athletic

Senior career*
Years	Team	Apps	(Gls)
2013–2019	Dunfermline Athletic	107	(1)
2019–2021	Partick Thistle	29	(0)
2021–2023	Falkirk	28	(1)
2023–	Montrose	82	(1)

International career^{‡}
2017–2018	Scotland U21	4	(0)
- * Club domestic league appearances and goals as of 19:50, 15 November 2026 (UTC) ‡ National team caps and goals as of 4 March 2019

Ryan Williamson (born 14 March 1996) is a Scottish footballer who plays as a defender for Scottish League One club Montrose. Williamson previously played for Dunfermline Athletic, where he made over 130 appearances, Partick Thistle and Falkirk.

== Club career ==
=== Dunfermline Athletic ===
Williamson, the son of former Pars defender Andy Williamson started his career aged 8 at Rothes Juniors Boys Club before joining Celtic as a 12 year old. He left the Bhoys after two seasons joining Dunfermline Athletic in 2010. His first appearance for the Pars came as a substitute against Arbroath in August 2013, and in November of that year he made his full first team debut in a 3–1 home win against Brechin City. After establishing himself in the first team, Williamson went on to make a total of 22 appearances in the 2013–14 season. The following two seasons were marred with injuries. After first dislocating his kneecap against Stirling Albion which forced him out until the end of February 2015, he then fractured his leg against Forfar Athletic in August 2015. This injury saw him miss the majority of Dunfermline's Scottish League One winning season although after recovering and playing in the final four matches of the season, he was rewarded with a two-year contract extension, keeping him at East End Park until summer 2018. Williamson stayed with the side for a further three seasons, before being released in May 2019.

=== Partick Thistle ===
Shortly after leaving Dunfermline, Williamson signed a two-year deal with fellow Scottish Championship side Partick Thistle. Williamson scored his first goal for Partick Thistle and his second career goal, in a 2–2 draw with Hamilton Academical in a Scottish League Cup group stage match. Williamson won the second honour of his career helping Thistle win the 2020–21 Scottish League One title.

=== Falkirk ===
Williamson left Partick Thistle at the end of the 2020/21 season and then signed for Falkirk, becoming Paul Sheerin's first signing as their manager.

=== Montrose ===
In January 2023, Williamson signed a pre-contract agreement with Montrose.

== International career ==
Williamson attended the Scotland U17 and U19 training camps in 2013 and 2014 respectively. After an impressive start to the 2017–18 season, Williamson was called up to Scot Gemmill's Scotland U21 squad to face England and Latvia in October 2017. He played in both matches, coming on as a second-half substitute on both occasions.

== Career statistics ==
As of 6 May 2019

Appearances and goals by club, season and competition
Club	Season	League			FA Cup		League Cup		Other		Total	
Club	Season	Division	Apps	Goals	Apps	Goals	Apps	Goals	Apps	Goals	Apps	Goals
Dunfermline Athletic	2013–14	Scottish League One	18	0	1	0	0	0	3 (Note: Appearances in the Championship play-offs)	0	22	0
Dunfermline Athletic	2014–15	Scottish League One	14	0	0	0	2	0	1 (Note: Appearances in the Scottish Challenge Cup)	0	17	0
Dunfermline Athletic	2015–16	Scottish League One	6	0	0	0	1	0	2	0	9	0
Dunfermline Athletic	2016–17	Scottish Championship	14	0	0	0	3	0	2	0	19	0
Dunfermline Athletic	2017–18	Scottish Championship	36	1	2	0	5	0	3 (Note: Appearances in the Premiership play-offs)	0	46	1
Dunfermline Athletic	2018–19	Scottish Championship	19	0	0	0	4	0	0	0	23	0
Dunfermline Athletic	Total		107	1	3	0	15	0	11	0	139	1
Partick Thistle	2019–20	Scottish Championship	0	0	0	0	0	0	0	0	0	0
Career total			107	1	3	0	15	0	11	0	139	1

== Honours ==
=== Club ===
Dunfermline Athletic

- Scottish League One: 2015–16

Partick Thistle

- Scottish League One: 2020–21
