= Jason Talbot =

English footballer

Personal information
- Full name: Jason Christopher Talbot
- Date of birth: 30 September 1985 (age 41)
- Place of birth: Irlam, England
- Height: 5 ft 8 in (1.73 m)
- Position: Left-back

Youth career
- 2002–2003: Bolton Wanderers

Senior career*
Years	Team	Apps	(Gls)
2003–2005	Bolton Wanderers	0	(0)
2004	→ Derby County (loan)	2	(0)
2004	→ Mansfield Town (loan)	2	(0)
2005–2006	Mansfield Town	6	(0)
2006	→ Port Vale (loan)	5	(0)
2006–2008	Port Vale	47	(0)
2008–2015	Livingston	178	(4)
2015–2018	Dunfermline Athletic	91	(2)
2018–2019	Cowdenbeath	10	(1)
Total		341	(7)
- * Club domestic league appearances and goals

Jason Christopher Talbot (born 30 September 1985) is an English former professional footballer who played as a left back.

He started his senior career with Bolton Wanderers in 2003, after loans to Derby County and Mansfield Town he joined Mansfield permanently in 2005. The next year he signed with Port Vale following a loan period. After two years at Vale, he tried his luck in Scotland, signing with Livingston. He helped the club to the Third Division and Second Division titles in successive seasons. He signed with Dunfermline Athletic in June 2015 and helped the club to win the Scottish League One title in 2015–16. He joined Cowdenbeath in July 2018.

== Career ==
=== Early career ===
Talbot started as a trainee at Bolton Wanderers in 2003. In September 2004 he joined George Burley's Derby County on loan, playing two Championship games before returning to the Reebok Stadium early the next month. In November 2004, he joined Mansfield Town on a one-month loan. He joined the "Stags" permanently in June 2005, having never made a first-team appearance for Bolton Sam Allardyce allowed Talbot to leave for free. He made seven appearances for the struggling League Two club within the first two months of the 2005–06 season, but soon fell out of contention.

=== Port Vale ===
He joined Port Vale of League One on an end-of-season loan on 31 January, following two trial appearances for the Vale reserves. On 28 February a high-tackle on Scunthorpe's Richard Hinds resulted in Talbot being sent off. At the end of the season he joined Port Vale on a free transfer, after Mansfield manager Peter Shirtliff made it clear his time at Field Mill was over. Red cards were a common theme of Talbot's time at Vale Park, and he wrote himself into the club's record books with five dismissals in his brief stay. An appeal was made to the FA following his third dismissal, during a 2–0 home win over Millwall on 24 March 2007. However, manager Martin Foyle admitted "every time I have gone to the Football Association with an appeal I do not seem to get anything." The Millwall match was to prove Talbot's last of the season, though he was retained upon its conclusion. The "tenacious tackling defender" was a regular during the 2007–08 season, though he fell out the club's first-team plans under new manager Lee Sinnott, Talbot knew by January 2008 he had no future at Vale.

=== Livingston ===
In July 2008, he signed a two-year deal with Scottish First Division side Livingston, following an appearance as a trialist in a 1–1 pre-season draw with Unirea Urziceni. A regular, he played over thirty games in his first season, receiving just three yellow cards. However, the "Lions" were demoted to the Third Division for breaching league rules on insolvency. He played 34 games in the 2009–10 season, as "Livi" stormed to the title, thereby winning promotion up to the Second Division. Many expected he would not be offered a new contract due to financial concerns, and Talbot went on trial at Dundee, however, he did return to sign a new contract with the club in July 2010.

Playing 25 games in 2010–11, he helped the club to a second successive promotion as Livingston regained their second-tier status. He signed a new deal with the club following their success. They retained their second tier status with a mid-table finish in 2011–12. Talbot made only 12 appearances for the club during 2012–13 season due to injury. In May 2013, he signed a new two-year contract with Livingston, keeping him at the club until the summer of 2015. He made 34 appearances in the 2013–14 campaign, though was sent off in games against Berwick Rangers, Dumbarton and Motherwell.

On 7 February 2015, he was booked for a high tackle on Hearts player Sam Nicholson that left Nicholson needing stitches in his face. After reviewing the incident the Scottish Football Association suspended him for two matches.

=== Dunfermline Athletic ===
Talbot signed a one-year contract with League One side Dunfermline Athletic in June 2015, becoming the first signing of new manager Allan Johnston. He helped the "Pars" to win promotion as divisional champions in the 2015–16 season. He signed a new contract in April 2016. On 27 August 2016, he was sent off for a two-footed tackle on Kyle Jacobs during a 1–0 defeat to Queen of the South at East End Park. Speaking in December, he said the club were targeting a fourth-place finish. He scored one goal in 38 games throughout the 2016–17 campaign as they fell one place behind this target after finishing four points below Greenock Morton. He played 31 matches as Athletic reached the play-offs with a fifth-place finish in the 2017–18 season, though was an unused substitute in the quarter-final second leg defeat to Dundee United. He was named as the club's Player of the Month for both October and November. He credited his good form to hard work in pre-season. Talbot left Dunfermline in June 2018 following the end of his contract.

=== Cowdenbeath ===
On 4 July 2018, Talbot signed with Scottish League Two club Cowdenbeath after impressing manager Gary Bollan throughout two trial games, thus joining one of Dunfermline's Fife derby rivals. On 22 December, he was sent off during a 2–0 defeat to Edinburgh City at Central Park. He ended the 2018–19 season with 16 appearances to his name as the "Blue Brazil" posted a sixth-place finish.

== Career statistics ==
Appearances and goals by club, season and competition
Club	Season	League			National cup (Note: Includes FA Cup, Scottish Cup)		League cup (Note: Includes Football League Cup, Scottish League Cup)		Other		Total	
Club	Season	Division	Apps	Goals	Apps	Goals	Apps	Goals	Apps	Goals	Apps	Goals
Bolton Wanderers	2003–04	Premier League	0	0	0	0	0	0	—		0	0
Bolton Wanderers	2004–05	Premier League	0	0	0	0	0	0	—		0	0
Bolton Wanderers	Total		0	0	0	0	0	0	0	0	0	0
Derby County (loan)	2004–05	Championship	2	0	0	0	—		—		2	0
Mansfield Town	2004–05	League Two	2	0	0	0	—		—		2	0
Mansfield Town	2005–06	League Two	6	0	1	0	2	0	1 (Note: Appearance(s) in the EFL Trophy.)	0	10	0
Mansfield Town	Total		8	0	1	0	2	0	1	0	12	0
Port Vale	2005–06	League One	5	0	—		—		—		5	0
Port Vale	2006–07	League One	22	0	0	0	3	0	1	0	26	0
Port Vale	2007–08	League One	25	0	3	0	1	0	0	0	29	0
Port Vale	Total		52	0	3	0	4	0	1	0	60	0
Livingston	2008–09	Scottish First Division	27	1	1	0	2	0	1 (Note: Appearance(s) in the Scottish Challenge Cup.)	0	31	1
Livingston	2009–10	Scottish Third Division	32	2	0	0	1	0	1	0	34	2
Livingston	2010–11	Scottish Second Division	25	0	0	0	0	0	0	0	25	0
Livingston	2011–12	Scottish First Division	25	0	0	0	2	1	2	0	29	1
Livingston	2012–13	Scottish First Division	12	0	0	0	0	0	0	0	12	0
Livingston	2013–14	Scottish Championship	29	1	1	0	3	0	1	0	34	1
Livingston	2014–15	Scottish Championship	28	0	1	0	2	0	4	0	35	0
Livingston	Total		178	4	3	0	10	1	9	0	200	5
Dunfermline Athletic	2015–16	Scottish League One	34	1	3	0	2	0	1	0	40	1
Dunfermline Athletic	2016–17	Scottish Championship	31	1	2	0	3	0	2	0	38	1
Dunfermline Athletic	2017–18	Scottish Championship	26	0	2	1	0	0	3 (Note: 2 appearances in the Scottish Challenge Cup and 1 appearance in the Premiership play-offs.)	0	31	1
Dunfermline Athletic	Total		91	2	7	1	5	0	6	0	109	3
Cowdenbeath	2018–19	Scottish League Two	10	1	2	0	4	0	0	0	16	1
Career total			341	7	16	1	25	1	17	0	399	9

== Honours ==
Livingston

- Scottish Second Division: 2010–11
- Scottish Third Division: 2009–10

Dunfermline Athletic

- Scottish League One: 2015–16
