= Shaun Byrne (footballer, born 1993) =

Scottish footballer

Personal information
- Date of birth: 9 June 1993 (age 33)
- Place of birth: Kirkcaldy, Scotland
- Position: Midfielder

Team information
- Current team: Montrose
- Number: 6

Youth career
- 2004–2008: Celtic
- 2008–2012: Dunfermline Athletic

Senior career*
| Years | Team | Apps | (Gls) |
| 2012–2016 | Dunfermline Athletic | 89 | (8) |
| 2016–2019 | Livingston | 95 | (5) |
| 2019–2024 | Dundee | 79 | (0) |
| 2023–2024 | → Raith Rovers (loan) | 31 | (0) |
| 2024–2026 | Raith Rovers | 34 | (0) |
| 2026– | Montrose | 6 | (0) |
- * Club domestic league appearances and goals as of 5 September 2026

Shaun Byrne (born 9 June 1993) is a Scottish footballer who plays as a midfielder for Scottish League One club Montrose.

Byrne started his career as a youth player for Celtic, before moving to Dunfermline Athletic where he made over 100 competitive appearances. He then played for Livingston for three seasons, helping the team earn back-to-back promotions. Byrne then joined Dundee in 2019, and would be part of two more promotions with the Dark Blues. While contracted to Dundee, Byrne spent his last season on loan at Raith Rovers, and joined his hometown club permanently for the following two seasons.

== Career ==
=== Dunfermline Athletic ===
Byrne joined Dunfermline Athletic in 2008, after playing at youth level with Celtic. After playing youth team football for his first few season with the club, Byrne made his first team debut in 2012 in the Scottish League Cup, coming on as a substitute for Ryan Wallace in the 3–0 defeat of Montrose. His first league appearance came again as a substitute, this time against Dumbarton in a 2–0 victory at The Bet Butler Stadium, whilst his first start for The Pars came in a New Years Fife derby against Raith Rovers.

Byrne scored his first goal for the club in a 2–3 defeat against Arbroath during the 2013–14 season. After winning the Scottish League One title and with his contract ending, Byrne was released by the Pars at the end of the 2015–16 season.

=== Livingston ===
Shortly after his release by Dunfermline, Byrne signed for recently relegated Scottish League One side Livingston. Byrne was a regular for the club as they gained consecutive promotions in the following two years. After going on to win what would be his second consecutive League One title with ease, the Lions would earn promotion to the Scottish Premiership the following year, defeating Partick Thistle in the Premiership play-offs in 2017–18, having finishing second in the Championship. He turned down a move away from the club in summer 2018.

=== Dundee ===
In June 2019, Byrne signed for Dundee on a three-year deal with an option of another year for an undisclosed fee. In May 2021 Byrne won the Premiership play-offs with Dundee, earning promotion to the Premiership. On 16 October, Byrne suffered ligament damage in his knee during a 2–1 win at home to Aberdeen. Although having been able to avoid surgery, his timescale for recovery was set between six and twelve weeks. In January 2022, after returning to the training pitch, Byrne signed a contract extension that would keep him at Dundee until 2024. That same month, Byrne would make his return to the pitch in a Scottish Cup victory over Dumbarton.

Despite being allowed to leave the team by new manager Gary Bowyer, Byrne would fight to earn his place back, and received a large ovation from a supportive Dundee fanbase as he came on as a substitute in a league win over Raith Rovers in November 2022. The following week, Byrne would notch his 100th competitive appearance for Dundee in another home win against Hamilton Academical. Byrne would make several late sub appearances near the end of the season for Dundee, last of which being in the Scottish Championship title-clinching win away to Queen's Park.

==== Raith Rovers (loan) ====
On 9 August 2023, Byrne joined Scottish Championship club Raith Rovers, on a season-long loan from Dundee. Byrne once again would reach the Premiership play-off final before Raith were defeated by Ross County. At the end of the season, Dundee announced that Byrne would depart upon the expiry of his contract.

=== Raith Rovers ===
Following his release from Dens Park in May 2024, despite several Championship rivals attempting to sign him, Byrne would rejoin Raith permanently on a two-year deal in June 2024.

=== Montrose ===
Following his release from Raith at the end of the 2025-26 season, Byrne signed a two-year deal with Scottish League One side Montrose.

== Personal life ==
His father died when Byrne was a toddler, and in 2016, his mother died suddenly.

== Career statistics ==
As of 5 September 2026

Appearances and goals by club, season and competition
| Club | Season | League | | | Scottish Cup | | League Cup | | Other | | Total | |
| Club | Season | Division | Apps | Goals | Apps | Goals | Apps | Goals | Apps | Goals | Apps | Goals |
|---|---|---|---|---|---|---|---|---|---|---|---|---|
| Dunfermline Athletic | 2012–13 | Scottish First Division | 14 | 0 | 2 | 0 | 1 | 0 | 3 (Note: Appearances in the First Division play-offs) | 0 | 20 | 0 |
| Dunfermline Athletic | 2013–14 | Scottish League One | 31 | 4 | 4 | 0 | 2 | 0 | 5 (Note: Two appearances in the Scottish Challenge Cup and three in the Championship play-offs) | 0 | 42 | 4 |
| Dunfermline Athletic | 2014–15 | Scottish League One | 22 | 2 | 3 | 1 | 0 | 0 | 1 (Note: Appearances in the Scottish Challenge Cup) | 0 | 26 | 3 |
| Dunfermline Athletic | 2015–16 | Scottish League One | 22 | 2 | 0 | 0 | 2 | 2 | 3 | 0 | 27 | 4 |
| Dunfermline Athletic | Total | | 89 | 8 | 9 | 1 | 5 | 2 | 12 | 0 | 115 | 11 |
| Livingston | 2016–17 | Scottish League One | 30 | 2 | 2 | 0 | 3 | 0 | 4 | 0 | 39 | 2 |
| Livingston | 2017–18 | Scottish Championship | 33 | 1 | 2 | 0 | 6 | 0 | 6 (Note: Two appearances in the Scottish Challenge Cup; Four appearances in the Premiership play-offs) | 0 | 47 | 1 |
| Livingston | 2018–19 | Scottish Premiership | 32 | 2 | 1 | 0 | 5 | 0 | 0 | 0 | 38 | 2 |
| Livingston | Total | | 95 | 5 | 5 | 0 | 14 | 0 | 9 | 0 | 123 | 5 |
| Dundee | 2019–20 | Scottish Championship | 22 | 0 | 1 | 0 | 5 | 0 | 1 | 0 | 29 | 0 |
| Dundee | 2020–21 | Scottish Championship | 22 | 0 | 2 | 0 | 4 | 0 | 4 (Note: Appearances in the Premiership play-offs) | 0 | 32 | 0 |
| Dundee | 2021–22 | Scottish Premiership | 24 | 0 | 3 | 0 | 4 | 0 | 0 | 0 | 31 | 0 |
| Dundee | 2022–23 | Scottish Championship | 11 | 0 | 1 | 0 | 4 | 0 | 0 | 0 | 16 | 0 |
| Dundee | 2023–24 | Scottish Premiership | 0 | 0 | 0 | 0 | 0 | 0 | 0 | 0 | 0 | 0 |
| Dundee | Total | | 79 | 0 | 7 | 0 | 17 | 0 | 5 | 0 | 108 | 0 |
| Raith Rovers (loan) | 2023–24 | Scottish Championship | 31 | 0 | 1 | 0 | 1 | 0 | 8 (Note: Four appearances in the Scottish Challenge Cup, four appearances in the Premiership play-offs) | 0 | 41 | 0 |
| Raith Rovers | 2024–25 | Scottish Championship | 23 | 0 | 1 | 0 | 4 | 0 | 1 | 0 | 29 | 0 |
| Raith Rovers | 2025–26 | Scottish Championship | 11 | 0 | 0 | 0 | 2 | 0 | 0 | 0 | 13 | 0 |
| Raith Rovers | Total | | 65 | 0 | 2 | 0 | 7 | 0 | 9 | 0 | 83 | 0 |
| Montrose | 2026–27 | Scottish League One | 6 | 0 | 0 | 0 | 4 | 0 | 2 | 0 | 12 | 0 |
| Career total | | | 334 | 13 | 23 | 1 | 47 | 2 | 37 | 0 | 441 | 16 |

== Honours ==
=== Club ===
Dunfermline Athletic

- Scottish League One: 2015–16

Livingston

- Scottish League One: 2016–17
- Scottish Premiership play-offs: 2017–18

Dundee

- Scottish Premiership play-offs: 2020–21
- Scottish Championship: 2022–23

Raith Rovers

- Scottish Challenge Cup: 2025–26
