= Lewis Martin (footballer) =

Scottish footballer

Personal information
- Date of birth: 8 April 1996 (age 30)
- Place of birth: Bonnybridge, Scotland
- Height: 1.88 m (6 ft 2 in)
- Position: Defender

Team information
- Current team: Forfar Athletic

Senior career*
Years	Team	Apps	(Gls)
2012–2022	Dunfermline Athletic	122	(4)
2022–2023	Kelty Hearts	28	(1)
2023–2025	Brechin City	54	(3)
2025–2026	Forfar Athletic	17	(0)
2026–	Brechin City	13	(0)

International career^{‡}
2014	Scotland U19	4	(0)
- * Club domestic league appearances and goals as of 31 May 2025 ‡ National team caps and goals as of 29 September 2015

Lewis Martin (born 8 April 1996) is a Scottish footballer who plays as a defender for Scottish League Two club Forfar Athletic. Martin has previously played for Dunfermline Athletic, Kelty Hearts and Brechin City. He has also represented Scotland at Under-19 level.

== Club career ==
Born in Bonnybridge on the outskirts of Falkirk, Martin started his footballing career with Rangers youth squads from under-10s level, before moving to Dunfermline Athletic at the age of sixteen. He made his first team debut during the 2012–13 season as a 90th-minute substitute against Scottish First Division opponents Greenock Morton, after the club encountered financial problems resulting in the redundancy of seven first team players. Martin then made his first full start in December 2013 in a league match against Ayr United and was a semi-permanent starter for the remainder of the 2013–14 season. His first goal for the club came in a one-all draw with Rangers.

During the 2014–15 season, Martin played in every league match for the Pars, bar those where he was called up to the Scotland under-19 squad. The 2015–16 season began in much the same way, with Martin starting the first thirteen competitive matches. However, after being involved in a car accident at the end of September, Martin missed the matches against Albion Rovers and St Mirren before returning to the starting eleven in a 3–0 win against Stranraer.

After undergoing groin surgery in August 2018, which was expected to keep him out for six weeks, Martin missed almost the entire 2018–19 season, returning for Dunfermline's penultimate league match of the season against Greenock Morton.

Martin eventually returned during the 2021/22 season after overcoming numerous injury setbacks. Following Dunfermline's relegation to Scottish League One, Martin's contract was not renewed and he left the club after ten years.

On 4 June 2023, Martin signed a two-year contract with Brechin City.

On 12 May 2025, Martin signed a pre-contract agreement with Brechin's Angus neighbours and Scottish League Two club Forfar Athletic.

== International career ==
In August 2014, Martin was called up for the Scotland under-19 squad to face Belgium in a friendly match in Tubize, making his debut as a second-half substitute, replacing Blackburn Rovers defender Sam Lavelle. His first full start for the side was against Norway in a qualification match for the UEFA European Under-19 Championship, in a one-all draw which saw the side miss out on automatic qualification to the elite round of qualification. In total, Martin made four appearances for the under-19 side.

== Career statistics ==
As of 27 May 2022

Appearances and goals by club, season and competition
Club	Season	League			FA Cup		League Cup		Other		Total	
Club	Season	Division	Apps	Goals	Apps	Goals	Apps	Goals	Apps	Goals	Apps	Goals
Dunfermline Athletic	2012–13	Scottish First Division	1	0	0	0	0	0	0	0	1	0
Dunfermline Athletic	2013–14	Scottish League One	13	1	1	0	0	0	4 (Note: Appearances in the Scottish Championship play-offs)	0	18	1
Dunfermline Athletic	2014–15	Scottish League One	28	1	1	0	2	1	2 (Note: Appearances in the Scottish Challenge Cup)	0	33	2
Dunfermline Athletic	2015–16	Scottish League One	18	0	1	0	3	0	2	0	24	0
Dunfermline Athletic	2016–17	Scottish Championship	18	0	4	0	2	0	3	0	27	0
Dunfermline Athletic	2017–18	Scottish Championship	16	0	1	0	5	0	4 (Note: Appearances in the Scottish Premiership play-offs)	0	26	0
Dunfermline Athletic	2018–19	Scottish Championship	2	0	0	0	0	0	0	0	2	0
Dunfermline Athletic	2019–20	Scottish Championship	26	2	1	0	5	0	1	0	33	2
Dunfermline Athletic	2020–21	Scottish Championship	0	0	0	0	0	0	0	0	0	0
Dunfermline Athletic	2021–22	Scottish Championship	6	0	0	0	0	0	1 (Note: Appearances in the Scottish Championship play-offs)	0	7	0
Career total			129	4	9	0	17	1	16	0	164	5

== Honours ==
=== Club ===
Dunfermline Athletic

- Scottish League One: 2015–16
