= 2015–16 Scottish Challenge Cup =

- Petrofac Training Cup

Tournament details
- Country: Scotland
- Teams: 32

Final positions
- Champions: Rangers
- Runners-up: Peterhead

Tournament statistics
- Matches played: 31
- Goals scored: 99 (3.19 per match)
- Top goal scorer: Rory McAllister (8 goals)
- All statistics correct as of 25 April 2016.

The 2015–16 Scottish Challenge Cup, known as the Petrofac Training Cup due to sponsorship reasons, was the 25th season of the competition. It was competed for by 32 clubs, which include the 30 members of the 2015–16 Scottish Championship, 2015–16 Scottish League One and 2015–16 Scottish League Two, the top 2014–15 Highland Football League club with a valid SFA club licence (Brora Rangers) and the highest placed team from the 2014–15 Lowland Football League with a valid SFA club licence (Edinburgh City).

The defending champions were Livingston, who defeated Alloa Athletic in the 2015 final, but were lost 1–0 in the quarter-finals to Rangers.

Rangers defeated Peterhead in the final at Hampden Park by a score of 4–0 to win the competition for the first time.

== Schedule ==
Round	First match date	Fixtures	Clubs
First round	25 July 2015	16	32 → 16
Second round	18 August 2015	8	16 → 8
Quarter-finals	10 October 2015	4	8 → 4
Semi-finals	14 November 2015	2	4 → 2
Final	10 April 2016	1	2 → 1

== Fixtures and results ==
=== First round ===
The first round draw took place on Monday 29 June 2015 at 14:30 BST at St Mirren Park.

==== North Section ====
25 July 2015	Cowdenbeath	0–1	Raith Rovers	Cowdenbeath
15:00		BBC Sport Report	Vaughan 23'	Stadium: Central Park; Attendance: 711; Referee: Clancy

25 July 2015	Forfar Athletic	1–0	Montrose	Forfar
15:00	Campbell 79'	BBC Sport Report		Stadium: Station Park; Attendance: 579; Referee: Newlands

25 July 2015	Arbroath	1–4	Dunfermline Athletic	Arbroath
15:00	Grehan 72'	BBC Sport Report	El Bakhtaoui 9', 28'; Moffat 20'; Wallace 62'	Stadium: Gayfield Park; Attendance: 914; Referee: Walsh

25 July 2015	Brechin City	0–3	Peterhead	Brechin
15:00		BBC Sport Report	Brown 57', 67'; McAllister 75'	Stadium: Glebe Park; Attendance: 346; Referee: Steven

25 July 2015	Falkirk	3–1	East Fife	Falkirk
15:00	P. Grant 2'; McHugh 90+1'; Baird 90+3'	BBC Sport Report	Smith 14'	Stadium: Falkirk Stadium; Attendance: 1,175; Referee: Anderson

25 July 2015	Elgin City	3–2	Stirling Albion	Elgin
15:00	Gunn 42' (pen.); Duff 60'; Cameron 83'	BBC Sport Report	Beattie 19'; Cunningham 54'	Stadium: Borough Briggs; Attendance: 612; Referee: Milne

25 July 2015	East Stirlingshire	2–3	Stenhousemuir	Stenhousemuir
15:00	Donaldson 30'; McKenna 77'	BBC Sport Report	Stirling 35', 45+1'; McMenamin 59'	Stadium: Ochilview Park; Attendance: 304; Referee: Finnie

25 July 2015	Brora Rangers	0–1	Alloa Athletic	Brora
15:00		BBC Sport Report	Mitchell 49'	Stadium: Dudgeon Park; Attendance: 265; Referee: Northcroft

==== South Section ====
25 July 2015	Hibernian	2–6	Rangers	Edinburgh
12:30	Stanton 14'; Cummings 61' (pen.)	BBC Sport Report	Tavernier 39'; Waghorn 44', 47'; Halliday 62'; Miller 77', 82'	Stadium: Easter Road; Attendance: 11,225; Referee: Collum

25 July 2015	Annan Athletic	3–1	Airdrieonians	Annan
15:00	Todd 51', 72', 74'	BBC Sport Report	Crighton 11'	Stadium: Galabank; Attendance: 553; Referee: Munro

25 July 2015	St Mirren	3–1	Berwick Rangers	Paisley
15:00	Thompson 19' (pen.); Agnew 50', 61'	BBC Sport Report	Henderson 6'	Stadium: St Mirren Park; Attendance: 2,394; Referee: Muir

25 July 2015	Edinburgh City	0–0 (a.e.t.) (1–3 p)	Queen's Park	Edinburgh
15:00		BBC Sport Report		Stadium: Meadowbank Stadium; Attendance: 344; Referee: Roncone
	Penalties
	Muhsin (penalty missed); Carse (penalty missed); Gair (penalty scored); Osborne (penalty missed)		Woods (penalty scored); Quinn (penalty scored); Wharton (penalty scored); McElroy (penalty missed)

25 July 2015	Greenock Morton	2–3	Dumbarton	Greenock
15:00	Kilday 73'; MacDonald 83' (pen.)	BBC Sport Report	Gallagher 6', 30'; Fleming 65'	Stadium: Cappielow; Attendance: 1,418; Referee: Charleston

25 July 2015	Ayr United	3–1	Albion Rovers	Ayr
15:00	Trouten 39' (pen.); Devlin 50'; Caldwell 71'	BBC Sport Report	Love 90+2'	Stadium: Somerset Park; Attendance: 1,003; Referee: Ross

25 July 2015	Livingston	2–1	Clyde	Livingston
15:00	Mullen 4'; Hippolyte 17'	BBC Sport Report	Bolochoweckyj 35'	Stadium: Almondvale Stadium; Attendance: 741; Referee: Allan

25 July 2015	Queen of the South	2–0	Stranraer	Dumfries
15:00	Lyle 20'; Conroy 90+1'	BBC Sport Report		Stadium: Palmerston Park; Attendance: 1,229; Referee: Madden

=== Second round ===
The second round draw took place on Monday 27 July 2015 at 14:30 BST at St Mirren Park.

==== North Section ====
18 August 2015	Forfar Athletic	0–3	Dunfermline Athletic	Forfar
19:30	Nicoll (red card) 31'	BBC Sport Report	Moffat 32' (pen.), 82'; El Bakhtaoui 44'	Stadium: Station Park; Attendance: 1,027; Referee: Allan

18 August 2015	Falkirk	3–5	Peterhead	Falkirk
19:45	Smith 13'; Watson 20'; Cooper 76'	BBC Sport Report	McAllister 22', 27', 43', 81', 87' (pen.)	Stadium: Falkirk Stadium; Attendance: 1,004; Referee: Colvin

18 August 2015	Stenhousemuir	2–0	Raith Rovers	Stenhousemuir
19:45	Cook 67'; Stirling 71'	BBC Sport Report	Thomson (red card) 90'	Stadium: Ochilview Park; Attendance: 449; Referee: Aitken

19 August 2015	Alloa Athletic	0–2 (a.e.t.)	Elgin City	Alloa
19:30		BBC Sport Report	Gunn 104' (pen.); McKenzie 111' (pen.)	Stadium: Recreation Park; Attendance: 240; Referee: Salmond

==== South Section ====
18 August 2015	Queen's Park	1–0 (a.e.t.)	Dumbarton	Glasgow
19:30	Bradley 95'	BBC Sport Report		Stadium: Hampden Park; Attendance: 587; Referee: Walsh

18 August 2015	Annan Athletic	1–2	St Mirren	Annan
19:45	Weatherson 1' (pen.)	BBC Sport Report	Stewart 50'; Gow 66'	Stadium: Galabank; Attendance: 794; Referee: Robertson

18 August 2015	Queen of the South	0–1 (a.e.t.)	Livingston	Dumfries
19:45		BBC Sport Report	White 115'	Stadium: Palmerston Park; Attendance: 1,189; Referee: Graham

19 August 2015	Ayr United	0–2	Rangers	Ayr
19:45		BBC Sport Report	Clark 15'; McKay 43'	Stadium: Somerset Park; Attendance: 7,468; Referee: Finnie

=== Quarter-finals ===
The quarter-final draw took place on Thursday 20 August 2015 at 14:30 BST at Hampden Park.

10 October 2015	Peterhead	3–0	Stenhousemuir	Peterhead
15:00	Redman 17'; McAllister 38'; Noble 45'	BBC Sport Report		Stadium: Balmoor Stadium; Attendance: 561; Referee: Muir

10 October 2015	St Mirren	4–0	Dunfermline Athletic	Paisley
15:00	Gallagher 10'; Mallan 23', 88'; Agnew 37'	BBC Sport Report		Stadium: St Mirren Park; Attendance: 2,339; Referee: Salmond

10 October 2015	Queen's Park	2–1	Elgin City	Glasgow
15:00	Carter 2'; Duggan 18'	BBC Sport Report	McHardy 50'	Stadium: Hampden Park; Attendance: 497; Referee: Walsh

20 October 2015	Rangers	1–0	Livingston	Glasgow
19:45	Clark 75'	BBC Sport Report		Stadium: Ibrox Stadium; Attendance: 17,386; Referee: Dallas

=== Semi-finals ===
The semi-final draw took place on Monday 12 October 2015 at 14:30 BST at Hampden Park.

14 November 2015	Queen's Park	1–2	Peterhead	Glasgow
15:00	Woods 22' (pen.)	BBC Sport Report	McAllister 17'; McIntosh 27'	Stadium: Hampden Park; Attendance: 917; Referee: Robertson

28 November 2015	Rangers	4–0	St Mirren	Glasgow
12:15	Holt 34'; Miller 77'; Waghorn 84'; Kelly 90+1' (o.g.)	BBC Sport Report		Stadium: Ibrox Stadium; Attendance: 22,369; Referee: Madden

=== Final ===
10 April 2016	Rangers	4–0	Peterhead	Hampden Park, Glasgow
15:00

== Statistics ==
=== Top goalscorers ===
As of matches played on 10 April 2016

Rank	Player	Club	Goals
1	(Scotland) Rory McAllister	Peterhead	8
2	(Scotland) Kenny Miller	Rangers	4
3	(Scotland) Scott Agnew	St Mirren	3
3	(Morocco) Faissal El Bakhtaoui	Dunfermline Athletic	3
3	(Scotland) Michael Moffat	Dunfermline Athletic	3
3	(Scotland) Stephen Stirling	Stenhousemuir	3
3	(England) Josh Todd	Annan Athletic	3
3	(England) Martyn Waghorn	Rangers	3
