= Sean Murdoch =

Scottish footballer

Personal information
- Full name: Sean Murdoch
- Date of birth: 31 July 1986 (age 40)
- Place of birth: Edinburgh, Scotland
- Position: Goalkeeper

Youth career
- –2003: Heart of Midlothian
- 2003–2005: Dunfermline Athletic

Senior career*
Years	Team	Apps	(Gls)
2005–2008	Dunfermline Athletic	5	(0)
2005–2006	→ Forfar Athletic (loan)	40	(0)
2006	→ Forfar Athletic (loan)	27	(0)
2007	→ Hamilton Academical (loan)	21	(0)
2008–2011	Hamilton Academical	36	(0)
2011–2012	Accrington Stanley	43	(0)
2012–2014	Hibernian	2	(0)
2015	Rochester Rhinos	19	(0)
2015–2019	Dunfermline Athletic	82	(0)
Total		275	(0)

International career
2003	Scotland U18	11	(0)
2006	Scotland U19	8	(0)
- * Club domestic league appearances and goals

Sean Murdoch (born 31 July 1986) is a Scottish former professional football goalkeeper. Murdoch, who began and ended his career with Dunfermline Athletic, also played for Forfar Athletic, Hamilton Academical, Accrington Stanley, Hibernian and Rochester Rhinos. Now a Cat 1 Match Official with the SFA (Scottish Football Association).

== Career ==
=== Early career ===
Born in Edinburgh, Murdoch grew up in the Wester Hailes area of the city. He played for youth teams of Hearts, but he moved across the Firth of Forth to play for Dunfermline in 2003. Murdoch progressed through the Dunfermline youth and reserve teams, earning international recognition. He moved on loan for the 2005–06 season to Forfar Athletic in order to get some first team experience. Murdoch signed a new 3-year contract with Dunfermline in July 2006, but was expected to move out loan again. He returned to Forfar on loan during the first half of the 2006–07 season. In the second half of the 2006–07 season, he moved on loan to First Division team Hamilton Academical.

Murdoch made his first team debut for Dunfermline in a 2007–08 UEFA Cup tie against Swedish club BK Häcken. Murdoch was at fault for the goal scored by Hacken, but made some good saves later in the game. He was second choice behind Paul Gallacher for most of the 2007–08 season and left to join Hamilton for a nominal fee of £15,000.

=== Hamilton Academical ===
On 6 May 2008, Murdoch signed for SPL side Hamilton, whom he had been on loan at earlier in his career. He extended his contract with Hamilton in May 2009. Murdoch was with the club for three years, but found it difficult to displace first choice goalkeeper Tomas Cerny. He left Hamilton in 2011, after the club had been relegated from the SPL.

=== Accrington Stanley ===
Murdoch signed for Football League Two club Accrington Stanley on a one-year deal in July 2011. He made his debut on 6 August 2011, in the opening game playing against Northampton Town, where he kept a clean sheet. Murdoch went on to become the first choice goalkeeper in the club's first twelve matches to the start of the season. However, Murodch lost his first choice role with the arrival of Lee Nicholls and the returning of Ian Dunbavin. After eight months at the club, Murdoch walked away from his contract in March 2012, due to a lack of payment.

=== Hibernian ===
He signed for SPL club Hibernian in October 2012 on a short-term contract, providing cover for Ben Williams and allowing young goalkeeper Calum Antell to move out on loan. In January 2013, his contract with Hibernian was extended until the end of the 2012–13 season. Murdoch made his only first team appearance of the 2012–13 season in a 3–1 win at Kilmarnock on 15 May. He agreed a new contract with Hibs during the close season. Murdoch was released by Hibs at the end of the 2013–14 season.

=== Later career ===
After a short spell with USL side Rochester Rhinos, Murdoch returned to his former club Dunfermline Athletic in July 2015. Murdoch was named the Scottish League One player of the month for October 2015, after keeping four clean sheets in the league for that month. In addition to this, he was instrumental in setting a new club record for clean sheets, after not conceding a goal in 612 minutes. A successful season with the club saw the Pars win the Scottish League One, with Murdoch signing a two-year contract extension, keeping him with the Fife side until summer 2018. Murdoch signed a further one-year extension on 20 June 2017.

Murdoch was first choice keeper for the Pars for most of 2016 through to the end of 2017, however, an injury to his pubic area saw him miss the rest of the 2017–18 season, with his last performance coming against Brechin City on 23 December 2017. Murdoch announced in April 2019 that he would retire from playing football at the end of the 2018–19 season, and that he intended to become a referee. He had long shown an interest in becoming a referee, and had already achieved a qualification at the time of his retirement.

== Personal life ==
In December 2014, Murdoch went viral when he proposed to his girlfriend in New York's Times Square and needed help with a credit "of dancers from New York's Broadway Dance Centre".

== Career statistics ==
As of 1 January 2018

Appearances and goals by club, season and competition
Club	Season	League			Cup (Note: Includes FA Cup)		League Cup (Note: Includes Football League Cup and Scottish League Cup)		Other (Note: Includes all other competitions.)		Total	
Club	Season	Division	Apps	Goals	Apps	Goals	Apps	Goals	Apps	Goals	Apps	Goals
Dunfermline Athletic	2005–06	Scottish Premier League	0	0	0	0	0	0	–		0	0
Dunfermline Athletic	2006–07	Scottish Premier League	0	0	0	0	0	0	–		0	0
Dunfermline Athletic	2007–08	Scottish First Division	5	0	0	0	0	0	3	0	8	0
Dunfermline Athletic	Total		5	0	0	0	0	0	3	0	8	0
Forfar Athletic (loan)	2005–06	Scottish Second Division	13	0	0	0	0	0	0	0	13	0
Forfar Athletic (loan)	2006–07	Scottish Second Division	17	0	0	0	1	0	2	0	20	0
Forfar Athletic (loan)	Total		30	0	0	0	1	0	2	0	33	0
Hamilton Academical (loan)	2006–07	Scottish First Division	11	0	0	0	0	0	0	0	11	0
Hamilton Academical	2008–09	Scottish Premier League	4	0	0	0	1	0	–		5	0
Hamilton Academical	2009–10	Scottish Premier League	6	0	0	0	0	0	–		6	0
Hamilton Academical	2010–11	Scottish Premier League	1	0	0	0	0	0	–		1	0
Hamilton Academical	Total		11	0	0	0	1	0	–		12	0
Accrington Stanley	2011–12	Football League Two	13	0	1	0	1	0	0	0	15	0
Hibernian	2012–13	Scottish Premier League	1	0	0	0	0	0	–		1	0
Hibernian	2013–14	Scottish Premier League	1	0	0	0	0	0	–		1	0
Hibernian	Total		2	0	0	0	0	0	–		2	0
Rochester Rhinos	2015	United Soccer League	1	0	0	0	0	0	–		1	0
Dunfermline Athletic	2015–16	Scottish League One	34	0	3	0	3	0	3	0	43	0
Dunfermline Athletic	2016–17	Scottish Championship	30	0	4	0	0	0	2	0	36	0
Dunfermline Athletic	2017–18	Scottish Championship	18	0	1	0	5	0	3	0	27	0
Dunfermline Athletic	2018–19	Scottish Championship	0	0	0	0	0	0	0	0	0	0
Dunfermline Athletic	Total		82	0	8	0	8	0	8	0	106	0
Career total			152	0	9	0	11	0	13	0	185	0

== Honours ==
=== Club ===
Dunfermline Athletic

- Scottish League One: 2015–16

=== Individual ===
- Scottish League One Player of the Month: October 2015
