= Faissal El Bakhtaoui =

French footballer (born 1992)

Personal information
- Date of birth: 8 November 1992 (age 34)
- Place of birth: Saint-Tropez, France
- Height: 1.78 m (5 ft 10 in)
- Position: Striker

Team information
- Current team: Aranova
- Number: 92

Youth career
- Racing Club de la Baie

Senior career*
Years	Team	Apps	(Gls)
2012–2016	Dunfermline Athletic	70	(31)
2016–2019	Dundee	58	(6)
2018–2019	→ Dunfermline Athletic (loan)	27	(1)
2019–2020	Queen of the South	15	(1)
2020–2021	Difaâ El Jadidi	15	(0)
2021	Nocerina	15	(8)
2021–2022	Ħamrun Spartans	22	(5)
2022	Nuova Florida	12	(8)
2022–2023	Livorno	19	(2)
2023	Nocerina	9	(2)
2023–2024	Cynthialbalonga	16	(2)
2024–2025	Guidonia Montecelio 1937	22	(3)
2025–2026	Valmontone 1921	20	(3)
2026–	Aranova		
- * Club domestic league appearances and goals as of 21 September 2025

Faissal El Bakhtaoui (born 8 November 1992) is a French professional footballer who plays as a striker for Serie D club Aranova. He has previously played for Dunfermline Athletic, Dundee, Queen of the South, Difaâ El Jadidi, ASD Nocerina 1910 (two spells), Ħamrun Spartans, A.S.D. Nuova Florida, Livorno, Cynthialbalonga, Guidonia Montecelio 1937 and Valmontone 1921.

== Career ==
=== Dunfermline Athletic ===
Born in Saint-Tropez, El Bakhtaoui started his career with French club Racing Club de la Baie. In July 2012, Scottish First Division club Dunfermline Athletic signed El Bakhtaoui after he impressed then-manager Jim Jefferies in trial matches versus Berwick Rangers and Lochgelly. His first season with The Pars resulted in him mainly working on his development, with only two appearances being made in the latter stages of the season.

With Dunfermline's financial difficulties causing many first team players to leave the club, El Bakhtaoui started to feature in more matches, mainly in the second half of the 2013–14 season, where he went on to score four goals in 18 matches; two of which were in Scottish Championship play-off matches versus Stranraer in May 2014.

The 2014–15 season started even more brightly for El Bakhtaoui, having been included in the Pars team for most of the matches. In October and November 2014, he scored four goals in five league matches to help Dunfermline in their push for promotion to the Scottish Championship.

El Bakhtaoui's start to the 2015–16 season was even more impressive than the previous season, with the forward scoring four consecutive braces in the first four competitive matches of the season, scoring a further two against Scottish Premiership side Dundee in the Scottish League Cup. After attracting interest from other teams, El Bakhtaoui was named Scottish League One Player of the Month for the month of August, primarily for his achievement of scoring 12 goals in eight matches. El Bakhtaoui was once more given the player of the month award for March, after his goals against Stenhousemuir and Ayr United, as well as his first career hat-trick in a 3–1 win over Brechin City, helped seal the Scottish League One championship for the Pars.

With his contract due to expire at the end of May 2016, El Bakhtaoui once again started attracting interest from a number of top-tier teams, including Motherwell and Dundee. Although offered a new contract by the Pars, El Bakhtaoui announced in April 2016 that he was ready to move to a club in a higher league, and with the relationship between him and manager Allan Johnston breaking down due to the latter allowing the player a 15-minute cameo in the final game of the season, it appeared that El Bakhtaoui would be leaving the club at the end of his contract.

=== Dundee ===
In July 2016, El Bakhtaoui went on trial with English Championship club Blackburn Rovers, after former Dunfermline striker Owen Coyle had been impressed by his goalscoring record. After his trial with Rovers ended, El Bakhtaoui signed a three-year deal with Scottish Premiership club Dundee on 2 August 2016. El Bakhtaoui's first appearance for the Dark Blues arrived as a second-half substitute for Danny Williams in a 3–1 win versus Ross County in Dingwall. El Bakhtaoui made a further appearance as a substitute versus Rangers at Dens Park, before making his first start six days later in a 1–1 draw with Hamilton Academical. El Bakhtaoui spent the season playing out wide or behind the striker and finished the season with 4 goals. One of which was a goal of the season contender in a 2–1 defeat versus Celtic receiving positive comments from Celtic manager Brendan Rodgers.

At the start of the 2017–18 season in the Dundee Derby in the second round of the Scottish League Cup, El Bakhtaoui scored his first goal of the season, a half volley from 25 yards to help Dundee to a 2–1 victory. In 2020, his goal was voted as Dundee's 'Goal of the Decade' by fans via Twitter.

El Bakhtaoui returned to Dunfermline on 12 July 2018, signing a one-year loan deal with his former club. His return to Dunfermline was met with much fanfare, however, El Bakhtaoui's second spell with the club was far less successful than his first. On his second debut for the Pars he scored two goals in a 7–1 Scottish League Cup win versus Brechin City. He scored one further goal, a penalty against Greenock Morton in December. After returning to Dundee he was released at the end of the 2018–19 season, having scored just eight goals in 66 appearances for the Dee.

=== Queen of the South ===
On 9 August 2019, El Bakhtaoui reunited with former Pars manager Allan Johnston, signing a one-year deal with Dumfries club Queen of the South.

On 14 January 2020, Queen of the South announced El Bakhtaoui as moving to Morocco to sign with Difaâ El Jadidi for an undisclosed fee. The Royal Moroccan Football Federation were reported in the announcement as interested in capping El Bakhtoui for the Moroccan local national team (with their defence of the African Nations Cup scheduled to be April 2020). To be selected for Morocco, El Bakhtaoui would be required to be signed for a club based in Morocco.

=== Difaâ El Jadidi ===
Difaâ El Jadidi announced El Bakhtaoui's arrival at the club on 16 January 2020.

=== A.S.D. Nocerina 1910 ===
In February 2021, it was announced that Italian Serie D side A.S.D. Nocerina 1910 were undergoing the bureaucratic process to register El Bakhtaoui. He officially signed on 5 March. Just two days later, he would have a dream debut for I Molossi, scoring twice in a 3–0 win.

=== Ħamrun Spartans ===
In July 2021, El Bakhtaoui was revealed to be in advanced talks with Maltese side Ħamrun Spartans, and would sign for them the following month. El Bakhtaoui would record his first goal for the club in a league win against Gudja United.

=== A.S.D. Nuova Florida ===
In June 2022, El Bakhtaoui returned to Italian football by signing with Serie D side A.S.D. Nuova Florida.

=== U.S. Livorno 1915 ===
After a brief but successful spell with Nuova Florida, El Bakhtaoui signed with fellow Serie D club U.S. Livorno 1915 in December 2022.

=== A.S.D. Nocerina 1910 (second spell) ===
On 7 July 2023, El Bakhtaoui would return to former club Nocerina.

=== S.S.D. Cynthialbalonga ===
In December 2023, El Bakhtaoui would move to fellow Serie D club SSD Cynthialbalonga. He made his debut shortly after off the bench in a defeat to Cavese.

=== Guidonia Montecelio 1937 ===
Despite it appearing that El Bakhtaoui had joined Serie D club Avezzano Calcio, it would actually be confirmed later that he had signed for fellow Italian club Guidonia Montecelio 1937, formerly known as Monterosi Tuscia. With Guidonia, El Bakhtaoui would win the Serie D Group G in the 2024–25 season to earn promotion to Serie C.

=== Valmontone 1921 ===
On 22 July 2025, El Bakhtaoui signed for Serie D club Valmontone 1921.

=== Aranova ===
On 1 August 2026, El Bakhtaoui signed for Serie D club Aranova on a free transfer.

== Career statistics ==
As of 7 June 2026

Appearances and goals by club, season and competition
Club	Season	League			National Cup		League Cup		Other		Total	
Club	Season	Division	Apps	Goals	Apps	Goals	Apps	Goals	Apps	Goals	Apps	Goals
Dunfermline Athletic	2012–13	Scottish First Division	1	0	0	0	0	0	1 (Note: Appearance in the First Division play-offs)	0	2	0
Dunfermline Athletic	2013–14	Scottish League One	14	2	1	0	0	0	5 (Note: One appearance in the Scottish Challenge Cup; four appearances and two goals in the Championship play-offs)	2	20	4
Dunfermline Athletic	2014–15	Scottish League One	23	7	3	2	1	0	2 (Note: Appearances in the Scottish Challenge Cup)	0	29	9
Dunfermline Athletic	2015–16	Scottish League One	32	22	3	1	3	4	3	3	41	30
Dunfermline Athletic	Total		70	31	7	3	4	4	11	5	92	43
Dundee	2016–17	Scottish Premiership	30	3	1	0	0	0	—		31	3
Dundee	2017–18	Scottish Premiership	28	3	2	0	5	2	—		35	5
Dundee	2018–19	Scottish Premiership	0	0	0	0	0	0	—		0	0
Dundee	Total		58	6	3	0	5	2	0	0	66	8
Dunfermline Athletic (loan)	2018–19	Scottish Championship	27	1	1	0	3	2	2	0	33	3
Queen of the South	2019–20	Scottish Championship	15	1	0	0	0	0	1	0	16	1
Difaâ El Jadidi	2019–20	Botola	10	0	0	0	0	0	—		10	0
Difaâ El Jadidi	2020–21	Botola	5	0	0	0	0	0	—		5	0
Difaâ El Jadidi	Total		15	0	0	0	0	0	0	0	15	0
A.S.D. Nocerina 1910	2020–21	Serie D	15	8	0	0	0	0	1	0	16	8
Ħamrun Spartans	2021–22	Maltese Premier League	22	5	3	2	0	0	0	0	25	7
A.S.D. Nuova Florida	2022–23	Serie D	12	8	0	0	0	0	0	0	12	8
U.S. Livorno 1915	2022–23	Serie D	19	2	0	0	0	0	1 (Note: Appearance in the Serie D playoffs)	1	20	3
A.S.D. Nocerina 1910	2023–24	Serie D	9	2	0	0	0	0	2 (Note: Appearance(s) in the Coppa Italia Serie D)	1	11	3
S.S.D. Cynthialbalonga	2023–24	Serie D	16	2	0	0	0	0	0	0	16	2
Guidonia Montecelio 1937	2024–25	Serie D	22	3	0	0	0	0	6	0	28	3
Valmontone 1921	2025–26	Serie D	20	3	0	0	0	0	4	0	24	3
Career total			320	72	14	5	12	8	28	7	374	92

== Honours ==
=== Club ===
Dunfermline Athletic

- Scottish League One: 2015–16

Guidonia Montecelio 1937

- Serie D - Group G: 2024–25
- Coppa Italia Serie D runners-up: 2024–25

=== Individual ===
- Scottish League One Player of the Month: August 2015, March 2016
- PFA Scotland Scottish League One Player of the Year: 2015–16
