= 2015–16 Scottish League One =

Scottish League One
- Season: 2015–16
- Champions: Dunfermline Athletic
- Promoted: Dunfermline Athletic; Ayr United
- Relegated: Cowdenbeath; Forfar Athletic
- Matches: 180
- Goals: 538 (2.99 per match)
- Top goalscorer: Faissal El Bakhtaoui; Rory McAllister (22 goals)
- Best goalkeeper: Sean Murdoch (15 clean sheets)
- Biggest home win: Peterhead 7–0 Cowdenbeath (21 November 2015)
- Biggest away win: Brechin City 1–6 Dunfermline Athletic (8 August 2015)
- Highest scoring: Dunfermline Athletic 7–1 Cowdenbeath (15 August 2015)
- Longest winning run: 5 matches: Dunfermline Athletic; Peterhead
- Longest unbeaten run: 19 matches: Peterhead
- Longest winless run: 17 matches: Forfar Athletic
- Longest losing run: 6 matches: Brechin City
- Highest attendance: 6,236; Dunfermline Athletic 1–0 Peterhead (30 April 2016)
- Lowest attendance: 210; Albion Rovers 4–1 Brechin City (23 February 2016)
- Total attendance: 175,562
- Average attendance: 975
- All statistics correct as of 7 May 2016.

The 2015–16 Scottish League One (referred to as the Ladbrokes League One for sponsorship reasons) was the 22nd season in the current format of 10 teams in the third-tier of Scottish football.

== Teams ==
Promoted from Scottish League Two

- Albion Rovers

Relegated from Scottish Championship

- Cowdenbeath

=== Stadia and locations ===
Airdrieonians	Albion Rovers	Ayr United	Brechin City
Excelsior Stadium	Cliftonhill	Somerset Park	Glebe Park
Capacity: 10,170	Capacity: 1,238	Capacity: 10,185	Capacity: 3,960
Cowdenbeath	2015–16 Scottish League One is located in Scotland		Dunfermline Athletic
Central Park	2015–16 Scottish League One is located in Scotland		East End Park
Capacity: 4,309	2015–16 Scottish League One is located in Scotland		Capacity: 11,480
Forfar Athletic	Peterhead	Stenhousemuir	Stranraer
Station Park	Balmoor	Ochilview Park	Stair Park
Capacity: 6,777	Capacity: 3,150	Capacity: 3,746	Capacity: 6,250

=== Personnel ===
Team	Manager	Captain	Manufacturer	Sponsors
Airdrieonians	(Scotland) Danny Lennon (acting head coach)	(Scotland) Marc Fitzpatrick	Macron	M&H Logistics
Albion Rovers	(Scotland) Darren Young	(Scotland) Michael Dunlop	Adidas	Reigart Demolition
Ayr United	(Scotland) Ian McCall	(Scotland) Nicky Devlin	Adidas	Bodog
Brechin City	(Scotland) Darren Dods	(Scotland) Craig Molloy	Pendle	Delson
Cowdenbeath	(Scotland) Colin Nish	(Scotland) Pat Scullion	Uhlsport	Subsea Pressure Controls
Dunfermline Athletic	(Scotland) Allan Johnston	(Scotland) Callum Fordyce	Joma	SRJ Windows
Forfar Athletic	(Scotland) Gary Bollan	(Scotland) Gavin Swankie	Pendle	Orchard Timber Products
Peterhead	(Scotland) Jim McInally	(Scotland) Steven Noble	Adidas	LFH Engineering Ltd
Stenhousemuir	(Scotland) Brown Ferguson	(Scotland) Stuart Malcolm	Prostar	Gulnar Tandoori Restaurant
Stranraer	(Scotland) Brian Reid	(Scotland) Steven Bell	Stanno	Stena Line

=== Managerial changes ===
Team	Outgoing manager	Manner of departure	Date of vacancy	Position in table	Incoming manager	Date of appointment
Dunfermline Athletic	(Scotland) John Potter	Stepped down	30 April 2015	Pre-season	(Scotland) Allan Johnston	8 May 2015
Cowdenbeath	(Northern Ireland) Jimmy Nicholl	Resigned	5 May 2015	Pre-season	(Scotland) Colin Nish	2 June 2015
Brechin City	(Scotland) Ray McKinnon	Signed by Raith Rovers	23 May 2015	Pre-season	(Scotland) Darren Dods	10 June 2015
Stranraer	(Scotland) Stephen Aitken	Signed by Dumbarton	27 May 2015	Pre-season	(Scotland) Brian Reid	1 June 2015
Forfar Athletic	(Scotland) Dick Campbell	Sacked	12 December 2015	8th	(Scotland) Stewart Petrie (interim)	15 December 2015
Airdrieonians	(Scotland) Gary Bollan	Signed by Forfar Athletic	20 December 2015	5th	(Scotland) Eddie Wolecki Black	22 December 2015
Forfar Athletic	(Scotland) Stewart Petrie (interim)	End of interim	21 December 2015	8th	(Scotland) Gary Bollan	21 December 2015
Airdrieonians	(Scotland) Eddie Wolecki Black	Illness	5 March 2016	4th	(Scotland) Danny Lennon (acting head coach)	10 March 2016

== League table ==
Pos	Team	Pld	W	D	L	GF	GA	GD	Pts	Promotion, qualification or relegation
1	Dunfermline Athletic (C, P)	36	24	7	5	83	30	+53	79	Promotion to Scottish Championship
2	Ayr United (O, P)	36	19	4	13	65	47	+18	61	Qualification to Championship play-offs
3	Peterhead	36	16	11	9	72	47	+25	59	Qualification to Championship play-offs
4	Stranraer	36	15	6	15	43	49	−6	51	Qualification to Championship play-offs
5	Airdrieonians	36	14	7	15	48	50	−2	49	
6	Albion Rovers	36	13	10	13	40	44	−4	49	
7	Brechin City	36	12	6	18	47	59	−12	42	
8	Stenhousemuir	36	11	7	18	46	80	−34	40	
9	Cowdenbeath (R)	36	11	6	19	46	72	−26	39	Qualification to League One play-offs
10	Forfar Athletic (R)	36	8	10	18	48	60	−12	34	Relegation to Scottish League Two

Source: BBC Sport
Rules for classification: 1) Points; 2) Goal difference; 3) Number of goals scored
(C) Champions; (O) Play-off winners; (P) Promoted; (R) Relegated

== Results ==
Teams play each other four times, twice in the first half of the season (home and away) and twice in the second half of the season (home and away), making a total of 36 games.

=== First half of season ===
Home \ Away	AIR	ALB	AYR	BRE	COW	DNF	FOR	PET	STE	STR
Airdrieonians		1–1	1–2	1–0	3–2	0–2	0–1	1–0	0–1	0–1
Albion Rovers	1–3		3–0	3–1	2–1	1–1	1–1	1–0	2–0	0–2
Ayr United	3–0	1–0		2–1	5–0	1–2	2–2	1–1	5–2	3–1
Brechin City	1–2	0–1	1–1		2–0	1–6	0–2	1–1	1–2	2–0
Cowdenbeath	3–0	1–0	4–2	3–0		0–0	2–1	2–2	2–2	1–2
Dunfermline Athletic	1–1	3–0	0–2	3–1	7–1		4–0	0–0	1–0	3–1
Forfar Athletic	2–3	4–0	2–2	0–1	0–1	0–4		0–2	4–1	1–2
Peterhead	2–0	1–1	3–0	2–3	7–0	2–1	2–2		2–2	1–1
Stenhousemuir	2–1	0–1	0–1	2–2	4–2	0–5	2–2	4–3		1–0
Stranraer	1–3	0–1	1–2	1–0	0–3	0–3	0–0	0–4	1–2	

Updated to match(es) played on 3 February 2016. Source: Scottish League 1
Legend: Blue = home team win; Yellow = draw; Red = away team win.

=== Second half of season ===
Home \ Away	AIR	ALB	AYR	BRE	COW	DNF	FOR	PET	STE	STR
Airdrieonians		1–1	0–1	0–2	2–0	3–0	1–1	3–4	1–1	1–1
Albion Rovers	1–2		1–3	4–1	0–0	0–1	3–2	1–1	1–1	0–1
Ayr United	0–3	0–1		2–1	4–1	0–2	2–1	1–2	4–1	2–1
Brechin City	3–3	2–1	1–0		2–2	1–2	4–0	5–1	1–0	1–0
Cowdenbeath	1–3	1–2	1–0	2–1		0–1	1–4	2–3	1–3	0–2
Dunfermline Athletic	0–1	1–1	3–2	3–1	2–1		2–2	1–0	5–0	6–1
Forfar Athletic	0–2	1–0	3–1	1–2	1–1	2–4		2–0	0–1	1–1
Peterhead	1–0	5–1	0–4	4–1	0–1	0–0	3–2		4–1	0–0
Stenhousemuir	3–2	1–3	0–4	0–0	2–3	0–3	2–1	1–4		1–5
Stranraer	4–0	0–0	1–0	2–0	1–0	4–1	1–0	1–5	3–1	

Updated to match(es) played on 30 April 2016. Source: Scottish League 1
Legend: Blue = home team win; Yellow = draw; Red = away team win.

== Season statistics ==
=== Scoring ===
==== Top scorers ====
As of matches played on 30 April 2016

Rank	Player	Club	Goals
1	(France) Faissal El Bakhtaoui	Dunfermline Athletic	22
1	(Scotland) Rory McAllister	Peterhead	22
3	(Scotland) Greig Spence	Cowdenbeath	17
4	(Scotland) Robert Thomson	Brechin City	15
5	(England) Joe Cardle	Dunfermline Athletic	14
5	(Scotland) Craig Moore	Ayr United	14
7	(Scotland) Ally Love	Albion Rovers	13
7	(Scotland) Shane Sutherland	Peterhead	13

==== Hat-tricks ====
Player	For	Against	Result	Date	Ref
(England) Joe Cardle	Dunfermline Athletic	Forfar Athletic	4–0	5 September 2015	
(Scotland) Rory McAllister	Peterhead	Stenhousemuir	3–4	31 October 2015	
(Scotland) Leighton McIntosh	Peterhead	Cowdenbeath	7–0	21 November 2015	
(England) Joe Cardle	Dunfermline Athletic	Stranraer	6–1	27 February 2016	
(Scotland) Rory McAllister	Peterhead	Brechin City	4–1	27 February 2016	
(France) Faissal El Bakhtaoui	Dunfermline Athletic	Brechin City	3–1	26 March 2016	
(Scotland) Robert Thomson	Brechin City	Peterhead	5–1	16 April 2016	

=== Discipline ===
==== Player ====
===== Yellow cards =====
As of matches played on 30 April 2016

Rank	Player	Club	Cards
1	(Scotland) Kyle Turnbull	Albion Rovers	11
2	(Scotland) Dean Brett	Cowdenbeath	10
2	(Scotland) Andy Geggan	Dunfermline Athletic	10
2	(Scotland) Steven Bell	Stranraer	10
5	(Scotland) Darren Dods	Brechin City	9
5	(Scotland) Euan Murray	Stenhousemuir	9
7	10 players		8

===== Red cards =====
As of matches played on 30 April 2016

Rank	Player	Club	Cards
1	(Scotland) Thomas O'Brien	Forfar Athletic	2
1	(Scotland) Scott Ross	Peterhead	2
1	(Scotland) Steven Noble	Peterhead	2
4	38 players		1

==== Club ====
===== Yellow cards =====
As of matches played on 30 April 2016

Rank	Club	Cards
1	Brechin City	83
2	Stenhousemuir	80
3	Cowdenbeath	76

===== Red cards =====
As of matches played on 30 April 2016

Rank	Club	Cards
1	Stenhousemuir	7
2	Cowdenbeath	6
2	Peterhead	6

== Awards ==
=== Monthly awards ===
Month	Manager of the Month		Player of the Month		Ref.
Month	Manager	Club	Player	Club	Ref.
August	(Scotland) Dick Campbell	Forfar Athletic	(France) Faissal El Bakhtaoui	Dunfermline Athletic	
September	(Scotland) Ian McCall	Ayr United	(Scotland) Nicky Devlin	Ayr United	
October	(Scotland) Darren Young	Albion Rovers	(Scotland) Sean Murdoch	Dunfermline Athletic	
November	(Scotland) Brown Ferguson	Stenhousemuir	(Scotland) Leighton McIntosh	Peterhead	
December	(Scotland) Allan Johnston	Dunfermline Athletic	(Scotland) Greig Spence	Cowdenbeath	
January	(Scotland) Jim McInally	Peterhead	(Scotland) Shane Sutherland	Peterhead	
February	(Scotland) Jim McInally	Peterhead	(Scotland) Rory McAllister	Peterhead	
March	(Scotland) Allan Johnston	Dunfermline Athletic	(France) Faissal El Bakhtaoui	Dunfermline Athletic	
April	(Scotland) Darren Dods	Brechin City	(Scotland) Robert Thomson	Brechin City	

== League One play-offs ==
Cowdenbeath, the second bottom team, entered into a 4-team playoff with the 2nd-4th placed teams in 2015–16 Scottish League Two; Elgin City, Clyde, and Queen's Park.

=== Semi-finals ===
==== First leg ====
3 May 2016	Clyde	3–1	Elgin City	Broadwood Stadium, Cumbernauld
19:45	Gemmell 19'; Linton 41'; McLaughlin 67'	BBC Report	MacLeod 49'	Attendance: 804; Referee: John McKendrick

4 May 2016	Queen's Park	2–0	Cowdenbeath	Hampden Park, Glasgow
19:45	Duggan 1', 66' (pen.)	BBC Report		Attendance: 572; Referee: Greg Aitken

==== Second leg ====
7 May 2016	Elgin City	0–2 (1–5 agg.)	Clyde	Borough Briggs, Elgin
15:00		BBC Report	Kirkpatrick 62'; Linton 90+5'	Attendance: 1,371; Referee: Euan Anderson

7 May 2016	Cowdenbeath	1–0 (1–2 agg.)	Queen's Park	Central Park, Cowdenbeath
15:00	Spence 54'	BBC Report		Attendance: 585; Referee: Craig Charleston

=== Final ===
The winners of the semi-finals, Clyde and Queen's Park, then competed against one another over two legs, with the winner replacing Cowdenbeath and being promoted to the 2016–17 Scottish League One.

==== First leg ====
10 May 2016	Clyde	1–3	Queen's Park	Broadwood Stadium, Cumbernauld
19:45	Gemmell 15'	BBC Report	Burns 5' (pen.); Berry 63'; Galt 84'	Referee: Kevin Clancy

==== Second leg ====
14 May 2016	Queen's Park	0–1 (3–2 agg.)	Clyde	Hampden Park, Glasgow
15:00		BBC Report	Linton 33' (pen.)
