= 2016–17 Dunfermline Athletic F.C. season =

Dunfermline Athletic
2016–17 season
- Chairman: Ross McArthur
- Manager: Allan Johnston
- Stadium: East End Park
- Championship: Fifth
- Challenge Cup: Quarter-finals, lost to Dundee United
- League Cup: Group stage, Third
- Scottish Cup: Fifth round, lost to Hamilton Academical
- Top goalscorer: League: Nicky Clark (15); All: Nicky Clark (16)
- Highest home attendance: League: 7,622 vs. Hibernian (22 October 2016); Cup: 2,580 vs. Inverness CT (26 July 2016)
- Lowest home attendance: League: 2,653 vs. Queen of the South (7 March 2017); Cup: 1,930 vs. Queen's Park (8 October 2016)
- Average home league attendance: 4,438 (942)
- Biggest win: League: Dunfermline Athletic 5–1 Dumbarton (4 March 2017); Cup: Brechin City 1–5 Dunfermline Athletic (3 September 2016)
- Biggest defeat: League: Raith Rovers 2–0 Dunfermline Athletic (20 August 2016); Dunfermline Athletic 1–3 Dundee United (10 September 2016); Dunfermline Athletic 1–3 Hibernian (22 October 2016); Falkirk 2–0 Dunfermline Athletic (4 February 2017); Cup: Dunfermline Athletic 1–5 Inverness CT (26 July 2016)
Home colours	Away colours
- All statistics correct as of 14 May 2017.

The 2016–17 season was Dunfermline Athletic's first season in the Scottish Championship, having finished top of the Scottish League One in 2015–16. The Pars were relegated from the competition's previous incarnation, the Scottish First Division at the end of the 2012–13 season.

Manager Allan Johnston made four permanent first-team summer signings as he began his second season as Dunfermline Athletic manager. The club's first competitive fixtures came in the revamped Scottish League Cup, where they were eliminated at the group stage after finishing in third place. Dunfermline Athletic also competed in the Challenge Cup and the Scottish Cup, where they were knocked out by Dundee United and Hamilton Academical respectively.

== Season review ==
=== May ===
- 16 May 2016: Manager Allan Johnston makes his first signing of the summer transfer window by recruiting former Cowdenbeath and Inverness Caledonian Thistle midfielder Nat Wedderburn on a one-year deal.
- 25 May 2016: Former Kilmarnock defender Lee Ashcroft becomes Dunfermline's second signing of the summer, following his release by the Rugby Park side. Ashcroft previously played under Allan Johnston whilst the latter was in charge of Kilmarnock.
- 27 May 2016: The draw for the Scottish League Cup takes place, with the new format seeing the club drawn in Group C alongside Inverness Caledonian Thistle, Dundee United, Arbroath and Fife rivals Cowdenbeath, with matches due to be played between the 19th and 31 July.
- 31 May 2016: It was confirmed that five first-team players were released after their contracts with the club had expired. Amongst those released were Shaun Byrne who had been with the Pars since 2008, and former captain Josh Falkingham.

=== June ===
- 3 June 2016: Managing Director Ross McArthur was appointed as the new chairman of Dunfermline, replacing Bob Garmory who had led the club following the acquisition by the fan-led group 'Pars United' in October 2013. Bill Braisby also took up the role vice-chairman.
- 8 June 2016: Having overseen the success of the club's social media profile, 29-year old Michael Mlotkiewicz was made general manager of the club .
- 13 June 2016: Former Queen of the South striker Gavin Reilly joined on a season-long loan from Heart of Midlothian. Reilly previously worked under manager Allan Johnston whilst both were at the Doonhammers.
- 17 June 2016: It was revealed that Dunfermline's first game in the Scottish Championship would be against Dumbarton, as the SPFL announced the league fixtures for the 2016–17 season. The club's first Fife derby with Raith Rovers would be at Stark's Park on 20 August 2016, with the final match of the season being away to Queen of the South.

=== July ===
- 8 July 2016: The club bring in former Dundee United youth player Euan Spark on a one-year deal, after the defender impressed as a trialist in 3 friendlies, scoring in the Pars first friendly of the season against Partick Thistle.
- 9 July 2016: Dunfermline's first match at East End Park saw them defeat an under-strength Hearts side 3–1, with goals from Andy Geggan and Joe Cardle seeing off the team from Gorgie.
- 15 July 2016: The side was confirmed as having come top of the fair play table for the previous season, with their only red card being rescinded after it was judged that Joe Cardle had not struck Ayr United defender Peter Murphy as referee Andrew Dallas had initially perceived.
- 18 July 2016: Kallum Higginbotham becomes the Pars sixth signing of the summer, as the former Partick Thistle and Kilmarnock winger joins on a one-year contract. Manager Allan Johnston expressed his delight signing, stating that he had admired Higginbotham "for a long time".
- 31 July 2016: The Pars' 2016 Scottish League Cup campaign comes to an end after defeat to fellow Championship side Dundee United by two goals to nil left the side in third place, four points behind the Tannadice club.

=== August ===
- 6 August 2016: The opening day of the Scottish Championship saw the Pars defeat Dumbarton 4–3 at East End Park, with Joe Cardle scoring the first hat-trick of the 2016–17 season. After leading 4–1, the last three minutes of the match saw Dumbarton awarded two penalties, with summer signing Lee Ashcroft being sent off after bringing down former-Par Robert Thomson in the box.
- 18 August 2016: The draw for the third round of the Scottish Challenge Cup takes place at The Kelpies in Falkirk, with former Pars manager Jim Jefferies drawing the home teams. Dunfermline are drawn against Scottish League One club Brechin City, with the tie to be played at Glebe Park on the weekend of 3 September 2016.
- 20 August 2016: The first league derby match with Raith Rovers in over 3 years sees the Kirkcaldy side finish 2–0 winners, with goals from Bobby Barr and Mark Stewart in the final 20 minutes giving the Rovers the win.
- 23 August 2016: Under 20s defender Stuart Morrison becomes the first Pars player since Lewis Martin in 2014 to be selected for international duty, with the 17-year old being called up by Scot Gemmill for the Scotland U19 side. for two friendly matches with Greece. Also in the squad is former Pars youth player PJ Crossan, who was bought by Celtic during the 2016 summer transfer window.
- 31 August 2016: Former Queen of the South and Rangers Striker Nicky Clark signs from Bury a two-year deal on transfer deadline day. Clark, who previously worked with manager Allan Johnston at Queen of the South, is also the son of current assistant manager Sandy Clark, who he also worked with at the Dumfries side.

=== September ===
- 1 September 2016: Allan Johnston makes his third loan signing of the season and his seventh first-team signing in total, bringing former Celtic midfielder John Herron on a short-term loan from Football League Two club Blackpool.
- 3 September 2016: The Pars run out 5–1 winner against Scottish League One side Brechin City at Glebe Park in the third round of the Scottish Challenge Cup. Goals from Paul McMullan, Gavin Reilly, Lee Ashcroft, as well as an own goal from Dougie Hill secure the win for Dunfermline, with Ally Love firing in a consolation goal for City.
- 5 September 2016: After a trial period with the club, Dunfermline make former Falkirk and Hibernian striker Farid El Alagui their eighth and final signing of the summer transfer window, with the French Moroccan joining on a four-month deal until January 2017.
- 10 September 2016: The first visit of Dundee United to East End Park in almost five years saw the Pars lose 1–3 to the Tannadice club. The match received a great deal of attention, after United goalkeeper Cammy Bell saved three penalties in the space of 24 minutes, from three different penalty takers, with Bell subsequently being awarded the match ball for his hat-trick of saves.

=== October ===
- 8 October 2016: The side progress to the quarter-finals of the Challenge Cup, defeating Scottish League One club Queen's Park 2–1 at East End Park. Farid El Alagui put the Pars 2–0, before scoring an own-goal in the 70th minute, completing an unlikely hat-trick.
- 16 October 2016: Former Par George Peebles died at a nursing home in Stirling, aged 80. Peebles, who spent 11 years with Dunfermline Athletic between 1955 and 1966, made over 300 appearances for the club and helped the Pars to win the 1960–61 Scottish Cup.
- 18 October 2016: French Moroccan striker Farid El Alagui wins the Irn-Bru Cup Golden Balls Award after his unconventional hat-trick against Queen's Park in the fourth round of the Scottish Challenge Cup.

=== November ===
- 12 November 2016: The Pars exited the Scottish Challenge Cup at the quarter-finals, after a 0–1 defeat to Dundee United at East End Park. Terrors defender Mark Durnan scored the only goal of the match in the 8th minute, with Dunfermline defender Lewis Martin receiving a straight red card after referee Willie Collum judged him to have pulled back United player Blair Spittal.
- 26 November 2016: Dunfermline faced Highland League side Buckie Thistle for the first time since 1980, defeating the Victoria Park club 3–5. Goals from Michael Paton, Kallum Higginbotham, Paul McMullan as well as an own goal from Jags defender Hamish Munro cancelled out goals from Buckie players John McLeod and Chris Angus.
- 25 November 2016: Jim Gillespie, who spent five years with Dunfermline between 1969 and 1974, died at the age of 69.

=== December ===
- 3 December 2016: Dunfermline's poor penalty record continued after Kallum Higginbotham had two late spot kicks saved by Ayr United goalkeeper Greg Fleming.
- 16 December 2016: Club director Margaret Ross died at the age of 65. Ross, who was the first chair of the Pars Supporters Trust (PST), was a key participant in the club's survival after entering into administration in 2013, with Ross leading fundraising through the fan-group Pars United.
- 31 December 2016: Former Aberdeen centre back Callum Morris returned to the club, having previously left to join Dundee United in June 2014. Morris signed a six-month deal, keeping him at East End Park until at least the end of the season.

=== January ===
- 7 January 2017: Former club director Margaret Ross, who died in December 2016, is named 'Fan of the Year' by the Scottish Football Supporters Association.
- 16 January 2017: Drew Main is appointed as a director on the club's board, after being elected as PST chair following the passing of Margaret Ross. Main was previously spent four years as Vice-Chair of the PST.
- 21 January 2017: The Pars progress to the Fifth round of the Scottish Cup after defeating Scottish League One club Alloa Athletic 3–2 at the Indodrill Stadium. Goals from Nicky Clark, Paul McMullan and Joe Cardle gave the Pars the victory as Callum Morris made his first start after returning to the club in December.
- 22 January 2017: After defeating Alloa, Dunfermline were drawn at home in the next round of the Scottish Cup to play Scottish Premiership side Hamilton Academical, with the tie to be played on the weekend of 11 February 2017.

=== March ===
- 4 March 2017: Nicky Clark became the first Pars player in over 22 years to score four goals in a league match, with the side defeating Dumbarton 5–1 at East End Park. Northern Irish striker George O'Boyle previously scored four against Clyde in a 5–0 league win in May 1994, whilst in the Scottish Cup, Andy Smith netted five times in a 7–2 defeat of Edinburgh City in January 1998.

== Squad list ==
As of 6 May 2017, the final match of the season

No.	Name	Nationality	Position	Date of birth (age)	Signed from	Signed in	Signed until	Apps.	Goals
Goalkeepers
1	Sean Murdoch	(Scotland)	GK	31 July 1986 (age 40)	(United States) Rochester Rhinos	2015	2018	86	0
43	David Hutton	(Scotland)	GK	18 May 1985 (age 41)	Ayr United	2015	2017	14	0
Defenders
2	Ryan Williamson	(Scotland)	DF	14 March 1996 (age 30)	Dunfermline Athletic youth teams	2013	2018	67	0
3	Jason Talbot	(England)	DF	30 September 1985 (age 41)	Livingston	2015	2017	78	2
4	Lewis Martin	(Scotland)	DF	8 April 1996 (age 30)	Dunfermline Athletic youth teams	2012	2018	103	3
5	Callum Fordyce	(Scotland)	DF	23 June 1992 (age 34)	Livingston	2015	2017	26	0
12	Lee Ashcroft	(Scotland)	DF	29 August 1993 (age 33)	Kilmarnock	2016	2017	46	4
14	Ben Richards-Everton	(England)	DF	17 October 1991 (age 34)	Partick Thistle	2015	2017	53	2
22	Callum Morris	(Republic of Ireland)	DF	3 February 1990 (age 36)	Aberdeen	2016	2017	83	5
Midfielders
6	Andy Geggan (c)	(Scotland)	MF	8 May 1987 (age 39)	Ayr United	2012	2017	194	33
7	Michael Paton	(Scotland)	MF	25 March 1989 (age 37)	Queen of the South	2015	2017	63	5
8	Nat Wedderburn	(England)	MF	30 June 1991 (age 35)	Inverness Caledonian Thistle	2016	2017	31	1
11	Joe Cardle	(England)	MF	7 February 1987 (age 39)	Ross County	2015	2018	204	44
15	Lewis Spence	(Scotland)	MF	28 January 1996 (age 30)	Dunfermline Athletic youth teams	2013	2017	45	1
16	Rhys McCabe	(Scotland)	MF	24 July 1992 (age 34)	(England) Sheffield Wednesday	2015	2017	51	5
18	Paul McMullan	(Scotland)	MF	25 February 1996 (age 30)	Celtic (loan)	2016	2017	39	7
20	Kallum Higginbotham	(England)	MF	15 June 1989 (age 37)	Kilmarnock	2016	2017	43	7
21	John Herron	(Scotland)	MF	1 February 1994 (age 32)	(England) Blackpool (loan)	2016	2017	26	1
Forwards
9	Michael Moffat	(Scotland)	FW	15 February 1985 (age 41)	Ayr United	2014	2017	122	27
10	David Hopkirk	(Scotland)	FW	17 January 1993 (age 33)	Annan Athletic	2015	2018	59	7
17	Gavin Reilly	(Scotland)	FW	10 May 1993 (age 33)	Heart of Midlothian (loan)	2016	2017	28	2
37	Nicky Clark	(Scotland)	FW	3 June 1991 (age 35)	(England) Bury	2016	2018	37	16

== Results & fixtures ==
Win Draw Loss Postponed

=== Pre-season ===
25 Jun 2016 Closed Doors Friendly	Partick Thistle	4 – 3	Dunfermline Athletic	Glasgow, Scotland
13:00	Devine; Pogba (pen.); Doolan; Nesbitt	Match report	Cardle 6'; Talbot 26'; Spark (Note: Trialist) 85'	Stadium: West of Scotland Science Park; Attendance: 0

29 Jun 2016 Friendly	Alloa Athletic	1 – 1	Dunfermline Athletic	Alloa, Scotland
19:30	Longworth 38'	Match report	Beck (Note: Trialist) 44'	Stadium: Recreation Park; Referee: Duncan

2 Jul 2016 Friendly	Livingston	1 – 5	Dunfermline Athletic	Livingston, Scotland
15:00	Mullin 62'	Match report	Reilly 20', 83'; Geggan 31'; McCabe 37'; Cardle 68'	Stadium: Almondvale Stadium; Attendance: 600; Referee: Muir

5 Jul 2016 Friendly	Clyde	0 – 1	Dunfermline Athletic	Cumbernauld, Scotland
19:45		Match report	Lafferty (Note: Trialist) 87'	Stadium: Broadwood Stadium; Referee: Newlands

9 Jul 2016 Friendly	Dunfermline Athletic	3 – 1	Heart of Midlothian	Dunfermline, Scotland
15:00	Geggan 15', 26'; Cardle 32'	Match report	Zanatta 85' (pen.)	Stadium: East End Park; Attendance: 2,016; Referee: McLean

12 Jul 2016 Closed Doors Friendly	Hamilton Academical	1 – 0	Dunfermline Athletic	Hamilton, Scotland
	MacKinnon			Stadium: New Douglas Park; Attendance: 0

=== Scottish Championship ===
6 Aug 2016 Match 1	Dunfermline Athletic	4 – 3	Dumbarton	Dunfermline, Scotland
15:00	Cardle 23', 26', 66'; Hopkirk 81'; Ashcroft (red card) 90+4'	SPFL Report	Thomson 18'; Docherty 90+1' (pen.), 90+4' (pen.)	Stadium: East End Park; Attendance: 3,496; Referee: Cook

13 Aug 2016 Match 2	Hibernian	2 – 1	Dunfermline Athletic	Edinburgh, Scotland
15:00	Richards-Everton 33' (o.g.); Cummings 78'	SPFL Report	Reilly 58'	Stadium: Easter Road; Attendance: 16,477; Referee: Collum

20 Aug 2016 Match 3	Raith Rovers	2 – 0	Dunfermline Athletic	Kirkcaldy, Scotland
15:00	Barr 71'; Stewart 79'	SPFL Report		Stadium: Stark's Park; Attendance: 5,114; Referee: Muir

27 Aug 2016 Match 4	Dunfermline Athletic	0 – 1	Queen of the South	Dunfermline, Scotland
15:00	Talbot (red card) 62'	SPFL Report	Lyle 45'	Stadium: East End Park; Attendance: 4,973; Referee: Charleston

10 Sept 2016 Match 5	Dunfermline Athletic	1 – 3	Dundee United	Dunfermline, Scotland
15:00	Paton 50'	SPFL Report	Murray; Andreu 45', 90+2'; Dixon (yellow card) 61' (red card)	Stadium: East End Park; Attendance: 5,563; Referee: Beaton

17 Sept 2016 Match 6	Greenock Morton	2 – 1	Dunfermline Athletic	Greenock, Scotland
15:00	Oliver 24'; Quitongo 84'	SPFL Report	Clark 30'	Stadium: Cappielow; Attendance: 1,756; Referee: Clancy

24 Sept 2016 Match 7	Dunfermline Athletic	4 – 3	St Mirren	Dunfermline, Scotland
17:15	Clark 40', 77'; Webster 62' (o.g.); El Alagui 85'	SPFL Report	Sutton 31', 45'; Hardie 81'	Stadium: East End Park; Attendance: 2,732; Referee: McKendrick

1 Oct 2016 Match 8	Ayr United	0 – 0	Dunfermline Athletic	Ayr, Scotland
15:00		SPFL Report		Stadium: Somerset Park; Attendance: 2,883; Referee: Robertson

15 Oct 2016 Match 9	Falkirk	2 – 1	Dunfermline Athletic	Falkirk, Scotland
15:00	Sibbald 27'; Hippolyte 52'	SPFL Report	El Alagui 75'	Stadium: Falkirk Stadium; Attendance: 6,377; Referee: Dallas

22 Oct 2016 Match 10	Dunfermline Athletic	1 – 3	Hibernian	Dunfermline, Scotland
15:00	Higginbotham 22' (pen.); Moffat (red card) 90+3'	SPFL Report	Wedderburn 55' (o.g.); Holt 66' (pen.); Graham 90+1'	Stadium: East End Park; Attendance: 7,622; Referee: Muir

29 Oct 2016 Match 11	Dumbarton	2 – 2	Dunfermline Athletic	Dumbarton, Scotland
15:00	J. Thomson 37'; Fleming 82'	SPFL Report	Clark 50'; Cardle 80'	Stadium: Dumbarton Football Stadium; Attendance: 1,018; Referee: Kirkland

5 Nov 2016 Match 12	Dunfermline Athletic	0 – 0	Raith Rovers	Dunfermline, Scotland
15:00		SPFL Report		Stadium: East End Park; Attendance: 5,649; Referee: Thomson

8 Nov 2016 Match 13	Dundee United	1 – 0	Dunfermline Athletic	Dundee, Scotland
19:45	Murray 79'	SPFL report	Wedderburn (red card) 39'	Stadium: Tannadice Park; Attendance: 5,996; Referee: Robertson

19 Nov 2016 Match 14	St Mirren	0 – 1	Dunfermline Athletic	Paisley, Scotland
17:15		SPFL Report	Clark 26'	Stadium: St Mirren Park; Attendance: 2,126; Referee: Walsh

3 Dec 2016 Match 15	Dunfermline Athletic	1 – 1	Ayr United	Dunfermline, Scotland
15:00	Clark 30'; Martin (yellow card) 48' (yellow-red card)	SPFL Report	Forrest 50' (pen.)	Stadium: East End Park; Attendance: 3,250; Referee: Cook

10 Dec 2016 Match 16	Dunfermline Athletic	2 – 1	Greenock Morton	Dunfermline, Scotland
15:00	Moffat 12', 23'	SPFL Report	Nesbitt 43'	Stadium: East End Park; Attendance: 3,101; Referee: Finnie

17 Dec 2016 Match 17	Queen of the South	2 – 2	Dunfermline Athletic	Dumfries, Scotland
15:00	Brownlie 39'; Dobbie 78'	SPFL Report	Talbot 61'; Higginbotham 73'	Stadium: Palmerston Park; Attendance: 1,561; Referee: McKendrick

26 Dec 2016 Match 18	Dunfermline Athletic	1 – 1	Falkirk	Dunfermline, Scotland
15:00	McCabe 59' (pen.)	SPFL Report	Hippolyte 10'	Stadium: East End Park; Attendance: 6,134; Referee: Anderson

2 Jan 2017 Match 19	Raith Rovers	0 – 2	Dunfermline Athletic	Kirkcaldy, Scotland
15:00		SPFL Report	Clark 11'; Ashcroft 77'	Stadium: Stark's Park; Attendance: 5,899; Referee: Robertson

7 Jan 2017 Match 20	Ayr United	0 – 2	Dunfermline Athletic	Ayr, Scotland
15:00		SPFL Report	Clark 26'; Geggan 33'	Stadium: Somerset Park; Attendance: 2,261; Referee: Thomson

14 Jan 2017 Match 21	Dunfermline Athletic	1 – 1	St Mirren	Dunfermline, Scotland
15:00	Higginbotham 37' (pen.)	SPFL Report	MacKenzie 46'	Stadium: East End Park; Attendance: 4,108; Referee: Collum

28 Jan 2017 Match 22	Dunfermline Athletic	1 – 1	Dundee United	Dunfermline, Scotland
15:00	Herron 28'	SPFL Report	Andreu 18'	Stadium: East End Park; Attendance: 4,670; Referee: Dallas

4 Feb 2017 Match 23	Falkirk	2 – 0	Dunfermline Athletic	Falkirk, Scotland
15:00	Baird 34'; Miller 77'	SPFL Report		Stadium: Falkirk Stadium; Attendance: 5,953; Referee: Collum

25 Feb 2017 Match 24	Hibernian	2 – 2	Dunfermline Athletic	Edinburgh, Scotland
17:15	Boyle 6'; Cummings 24' (pen.)	SPFL Report	McMullan 26'; Higginbotham 46'	Stadium: Easter Road; Attendance: 14,437; Referee: Beaton

4 Mar 2017 Match 25	Dunfermline Athletic	5 – 1	Dumbarton	Dunfermline, Scotland
15:00	Clark 7', 60', 79', 84'; McMullan 27'	SPFL Report	Harvie 86'	Stadium: East End Park; Attendance: 3,320; Referee: Clancy

7 Mar 2017 Match 26	Dunfermline Athletic	1 – 1	Queen of the South	Dunfermline, Scotland
19:45	Moffat 17'	SPFL Report	Thomson 28'	Stadium: East End Park; Attendance: 2,653; Referee: Anderson

11 Mar 2017 Match 27	St Mirren	0 – 0	Dunfermline Athletic	Paisley, Scotland
15:00		SPFL Report		Stadium: St Mirren Park; Attendance: 4,582; Referee: Finnie

18 Mar 2017 Match 28	Dunfermline Athletic	0 – 1	Ayr United	Dunfermline, Scotland
15:00		SPFL Report	Docherty 59'	Stadium: East End Park; Attendance: 3,276; Referee: Madden

25 Mar 2017 Match 29	Greenock Morton	0 – 1	Dunfermline Athletic	Greenock, Scotland
15:00		SPFL Report	Wedderburn 30'	Stadium: Cappielow; Attendance: 2,670; Referee: Northcroft

1 Apr 2017 Match 30	Dunfermline Athletic	1 – 1	Hibernian	Dunfermline, Scotland
15:00	Higginbotham 59' (pen.)	SPFL Report	McGinn 12'	Stadium: East End Park; Attendance: 7,058; Referee: Aitken

8 Apr 2017 Match 31	Dunfermline Athletic	1 – 0	Raith Rovers	Dunfermline, Scotland
15:00	Higginbotham 49' (pen.)	SPFL Report		Stadium: East End Park; Attendance: 4,865; Referee: Dallas

11 Apr 2017 Match 32	Dundee United	1 – 0	Dunfermline Athletic	Dundee, Scotland
19:45	Mikkelsen 30'	SPFL report		Stadium: Tannadice Park; Attendance: 5,304; Referee: Collum

15 Apr 2017 Match 33	Dumbarton	0 – 2	Dunfermline Athletic	Dumbarton, Scotland
15:00		SPFL Report	McCabe 80'; Hopkirk 85'	Stadium: Dumbarton Football Stadium; Attendance: 1,142; Referee: Muir

23 Apr 2017 Match 34	Dunfermline Athletic	1 – 2	Falkirk	Dunfermline, Scotland
15:00	Clark 35'; Martin (red card) 58'	SPFL Report	Muirhead 53' (pen.); Austin 70'	Stadium: East End Park; Attendance: 5,076; Referee: Duncan

29 Apr 2017 Match 35	Dunfermline Athletic	3 – 1	Greenock Morton	Dunfermline, Scotland
15:00	Clark 3'; Moffat 51'; McCabe 85'	SPFL Report	Shankland 37'	Stadium: East End Park; Attendance: 3,339; Referee: Anderson

6 May 2017 Match 36	Queen of the South	0 – 1	Dunfermline Athletic	Dumfries, Scotland
15:00		SPFL Report	Clark 90+1'	Stadium: Palmerston Park; Attendance: 1,849; Referee: Newlands

=== Scottish League Cup ===
==== Table ====
Pos	Team	Pld	W	PW	PL	L	GF	GA	GD	Pts	Qualification
1	Inverness CT (Q)	4	3	0	1	0	15	3	+12	10	Qualification for the Second Round
2	Dundee United (Q)	4	2	2	0	0	10	3	+7	10	Qualification for the Second Round
3	Dunfermline Athletic	4	2	0	0	2	7	7	0	6	
4	Cowdenbeath	4	1	0	0	3	4	11	−7	3	
5	Arbroath	4	0	0	1	3	1	13	−12	1	

Source: SPFL
(Q) Qualified to the phase indicated

==== Matches ====
19 Jul 2016 Match 1	Dunfermline Athletic	3 – 0	Arbroath	Dunfermline, Scotland
19:45	Moffat 44', 66'; Geggan 62'	SPFL report	Little (red card) 86'	Stadium: East End Park; Attendance: 1,974; Referee: Munro; Man of the Match: Williamson

23 Jul 2016 Match 2	Cowdenbeath	0 – 3	Dunfermline Athletic	Cowdenbeath, Scotland
15:00		SPFL report	Geggan 57', 85'; Ashcroft 68'	Stadium: Central Park; Attendance: 1,481; Referee: Steven; Man of the Match: Geggan

26 Jul 2016 Match 3	Dunfermline Athletic	1 – 5	Inverness CT	Dunfermline, Scotland
19:45	Geggan 28'	SPFL report	Vigurs 16', 42', 66'; King 54'; Tremarco 89'	Stadium: East End Park; Attendance: 2,580; Referee: Allan

31 Jul 2016 Match 4	Dundee United	2 – 0	Dunfermline Athletic	Dundee, Scotland
15:00	Murray 49'; Fraser 83'	SPFL report		Stadium: Tannadice Park; Attendance: 4,951; Referee: McKendrick

=== Scottish Challenge Cup ===
3 Sep 2016 Challenge Cup round 3	Brechin City	1 – 5	Dunfermline Athletic	Brechin, Scotland
15:10	Love 27'	SPFL Report	Ashcroft 17', 90+1'; Hill 25' (o.g.); McMullan 49'; Reilly 80'	Stadium: Glebe Park; Attendance: 577; Referee: Allan

8 Oct 2016 Challenge Cup round 4	Dunfermline Athletic	2 – 1	Queen's Park	Dunfermline, Scotland
15:00	El Alagui 48', 62'	SPFL Report	El Alagui 70' (o.g.)	Stadium: East End Park; Attendance: 1,930; Referee: Walsh

12 Nov 2016 Challenge Cup QF	Dunfermline Athletic	0 – 1	Dundee United	Dunfermline, Scotland
12:30	Martin (red card) 57'	SPFL Report	Durnan 8'	Stadium: East End Park; Attendance: 2,576; Referee: Collum

=== Scottish Cup ===
26 Nov 2016 Scottish Cup round 3	Buckie Thistle	3 – 5	Dunfermline Athletic	Buckie, Scotland
15:00	Mcleod 14'; Angus 33', 68'	BBC Sport Report	Munro 12' (o.g.); Paton 16' (pen.); Higginbotham 58'; McMullan 60', 90+2'	Stadium: Victoria Park; Attendance: 1,440; Referee: Charleston

21 Jan 2017 Scottish Cup round 4	Alloa Athletic	2 – 3	Dunfermline Athletic	Alloa, Scotland
15:00	McCluskey 68'; Spence 90+2'	BBC Sport report	Clark 12'; McMullan 44'; Cardle 60'	Stadium: Recreation Park; Attendance: 1,871; Referee: Newlands

11 Feb 2017 Scottish Cup round 5	Dunfermline Athletic	1 – 1	Hamilton Academical	Dunfermline, Scotland
15:00	McMullan 30'	BBC Sport Report	Redmond 74'	Stadium: East End Park; Attendance: 2,945; Referee: Thomson

14 Feb 2017 Scottish Cup round 5 Replay	Hamilton Academical	1 – 1 (3 – 0 p)	Dunfermline Athletic	Hamilton, Scotland
15:00	Bingham 87' (pen.)	BBC Sport Report	Morris 25'	Stadium: New Douglas Park; Attendance: 1,222; Referee: Thomson
	Penalties
	Donati (penalty scored); Redmond (penalty missed); Brophy (penalty scored); Devlin (penalty scored)		McCabe (penalty missed); Paton (penalty missed); Reilly (penalty missed)

== Squad statistics ==
=== Starting XI ===

Most frequent starting line-up uses the team's most used formation: 4–4–2. The players used are those who have played the most games in each respective position, not necessarily who have played most games out of all the players.

=== Captains ===
No.	P	Name	Country	No. games	Notes
6	MF	Andy Geggan	(Scotland)	34	Club Captain
5	DF	Callum Fordyce	(Scotland)	10	
1	GK	Sean Murdoch	(Scotland)	2	
11	MF	Joe Cardle	(England)	1	

Last updated: 7 May 2017
Source: Competitive match reports.
Competitive matches only
Matches started as captain only
Country: FIFA nationality; No.: Squad number; P: Position; Name: Player name; No. Games: Number of games started as captain.

=== Appearances and goals ===
During the 2016–17 season, Dunfermline used twenty-seven different players in competitive matches. The table below shows the number of appearances and goals scored by each player. Centre-back Lee Ashcroft has made the most appearances, playing forty-six out of a possible 47 games, with Nicky Clark leading the scoring with sixteen goals in all competitions.

As of 10 May 2017

No.	Pos	Nat	Player	Total		Scottish Championship		Scottish Cup		League Cup		Challenge Cup	
No.	Pos	Nat	Player	Apps	Goals	Apps	Goals	Apps	Goals	Apps	Goals	Apps	Goals
1	GK	(Scotland) SCO	Sean Murdoch	36	0	30	0	4	0	0	0	2	0
2	DF	(Scotland) SCO	Ryan Williamson	19	0	11+3	0	0	0	3	0	2	0
3	DF	(England) ENG	Jason Talbot	38	1	30+1	1	1+1	0	3	0	2	0
4	DF	(Scotland) SCO	Lewis Martin	27	0	16+2	0	4	0	2	0	3	0
5	DF	(Scotland) SCO	Callum Fordyce	16	0	13	0	1	0	0	0	1+1	0
6	MF	(Scotland) SCO	Andy Geggan	37	5	29	1	2	0	3	4	3	0
7	MF	(Scotland) SCO	Michael Paton	22	2	10+8	1	1+1	1	0	0	2	0
8	MF	(England) ENG	Nat Wedderburn	31	1	23+1	1	4	0	3	0	0	0
9	FW	(Scotland) SCO	Michael Moffat	38	6	24+5	4	3+1	0	4	2	1	0
10	FW	(Scotland) SCO	David Hopkirk	13	2	1+10	2	0+1	0	0	0	0+1	0
11	MF	(England) ENG	Joe Cardle	32	5	9+14	4	0+2	1	4	0	2+1	0
12	DF	(Scotland) SCO	Lee Ashcroft	46	4	35	1	4	0	4	1	3	2
14	DF	(England) ENG	Ben Richards-Everton	10	0	6	0	0	0	4	0	0	0
15	MF	(Scotland) SCO	Lewis Spence	6	0	0+2	0	0	0	2+2	0	0	0
16	MF	(Scotland) SCO	Rhys McCabe	33	3	18+5	3	1+2	0	3+1	0	3	0
17	FW	(Scotland) SCO	Gavin Reilly	28	2	11+11	1	1+1	0	2	0	2	1
18	MF	(Scotland) SCO	Paul McMullan	39	7	23+6	2	4	4	0+4	0	1+1	1
20	MF	(England) ENG	Kallum Higginbotham	43	7	31+1	6	3+1	1	3+1	0	1+2	0
21	MF	(Scotland) SCO	John Herron	26	1	20	1	3+1	0	0	0	1+1	0
22	DF	(Republic of Ireland) IRL	Callum Morris	16	1	13	0	3	1	0	0	0	0
28	MF	(Scotland) SCO	Johnny Galloway	0	0	0	0	0	0	0	0	0	0
30	GK	(Scotland) SCO	Cammy Gill	0	0	0	0	0	0	0	0	0	0
31	DF	(Scotland) SCO	Stuart Morrison	0	0	0	0	0	0	0	0	0	0
32	MF	(Scotland) SCO	Brandon Luke	0	0	0	0	0	0	0	0	0	0
33	FW	(Scotland) SCO	Callum Smith	3	0	0+2	0	0	0	0+1	0	0	0
37	FW	(Scotland) SCO	Nicky Clark	37	16	30	15	4	1	0	0	3	0
43	GK	(Scotland) SCO	David Hutton	12	0	6+1	0	0	0	4	0	1	0
Players away from the club on loan:
19	DF	(Scotland) SCO	Euan Spark	0	0	0	0	0	0	0	0	0	0
24	DF	(Scotland) SCO	Conner Duthie	3	0	1+1	0	1	0	0	0	0	0
34	MF	(Scotland) SCO	Scott Lochhead	1	0	0	0	0	0	0+1	0	0	0
Players who appeared for Dunfermline Athletic but left during the season:
26	FW	(Scotland) SCO	James Thomas	2	0	0	0	0	0	0+2	0	0	0
48	FW	(France) FRA	Farid El Alagui	16	4	6+7	2	0+1	0	0	0	0+2	2

=== Clean sheets ===
Dunfermline have used two goalkeepers in all competitions during the 2016–17 season. The table below shows the total number of shutouts made, with 12 clean sheets having been kept in all competitions after 47 matches.

No.	Pos	Nat	Name	Total	Scottish Championship	Scottish Cup	Scottish League Cup	Scottish Challenge Cup
1	GK	(Scotland)	Sean Murdoch	10	10			
43	GK	(Scotland)	David Hutton	2			2	
			Totals	12	10	0	2	0

Last updated: 7 May 2017
Source: Match reports in Competitive matches

=== Goalscorers ===
During the 2016–17 season, sixteen Dunfermline players scored 70 goals in all competitions, with 3 goals having been own goals scored by Brechin City defender Dougie Hill, St Mirren captain Andy Webster and Buckie Thistle defender Hamish Munro. Striker Nicky Clark was the club's top scorer, with 16 goals in 47 competitive matches. Two players scored hat-tricks, with both coming against Dumbarton; Joe Cardle scored three on the opening day of the season, whilst Nicky Clark scored four in the 5–1 victory over the Sons in March 2017.

As of match played 6 May 2017

Place	Position	Nation	Name	Total	Scottish Championship	Scottish Cup	Scottish League Cup	Scottish Challenge Cup
1	FW	(Scotland)	Nicky Clark	16	15	1		
2	MF	(England)	Kallum Higginbotham	7	6	1		
2	MF	(Scotland)	Paul McMullan	7	2	4		1
4	FW	(Scotland)	Michael Moffat	6	4		2	
5	MF	(England)	Joe Cardle	5	4	1		
5	MF	(Scotland)	Andy Geggan	5	1		4	
7	FW	(France)	Farid El Alagui	4	2			2
7	DF	(Scotland)	Lee Ashcroft	4	1		1	2
9	MF	(Scotland)	Rhys McCabe	3	3			
10	FW	(Scotland)	David Hopkirk	2	2			
10	MF	(Scotland)	Michael Paton	2	1	1		
10	FW	(Scotland)	Gavin Reilly	2	1			1
13	MF	(Scotland)	John Herron	1	1			
13	DF	(England)	Jason Talbot	1	1			
13	MF	(England)	Nat Wedderburn	1	1			
13	DF	(Republic of Ireland)	Callum Morris	1		1		
—			Own goal	3	1	1		1
Total				70	46	10	7	7

=== Disciplinary record ===
As of match played 6 May 2017

Squad number	Position	Nation	Name	Total		Scottish Championship		Scottish Cup		Scottish League Cup		Scottish Challenge Cup	
Squad number	Position	Nation	Name	Booked	Sent off (straight red)	Booked	Sent off (straight red)	Booked	Sent off (straight red)	Booked	Sent off (straight red)	Booked	Sent off (straight red)
4	DF	(Scotland)	Lewis Martin	5	3	5	2						1
8	MF	(England)	Nat Wedderburn	5	1	5	1						
12	DF	(Scotland)	Lee Ashcroft	5	1	3	1					2	
3	DF	(England)	Jason Talbot	3	1	2	1					1	
20	MF	(England)	Kallum Higginbotham	13		10		2		1			
6	MF	(Scotland)	Andy Geggan	11		9				2			
21	MF	(Scotland)	John Herron	6		6							
9	FW	(Scotland)	Michael Moffat	4	(Note: Michael Moffat was sent off against Hibernian for violent conduct, however this was rescinded and reduced to a yellow card after the club successfully appealed referee Alan Muir's decision.)	4							
18	MF	(Scotland)	Paul McMullan	4		3		1					
37	FW	(Scotland)	Nicky Clark	4		3		1					
1	GK	(Scotland)	Sean Murdoch	3		2		1					
14	DF	(England)	Ben Richards-Everton	3		2				1			
48	FW	(France)	Farid El Alagui	3		2						1	
11	MF	(England)	Joe Cardle	3		1				1		1	
7	MF	(Scotland)	Michael Paton	2		2							
22	DF	(Republic of Ireland)	Callum Morris	2		2							
16	MF	(Scotland)	Rhys McCabe	2		1		1					
10	FW	(Scotland)	David Hopkirk	1		1							
43	GK	(Scotland)	David Hutton	1		1							
Total				78	6	65	5	5	0	5	0	5	1

== Club statistics ==
=== League table ===
Pos	Team	Pld	W	D	L	GF	GA	GD	Pts	Promotion, qualification or relegation
3	Dundee United	36	15	12	9	50	42	+8	57	Qualification for the Premiership play-off quarter-finals
4	Greenock Morton	36	13	13	10	44	41	+3	52	Qualification for the Premiership play-off quarter-finals
5	Dunfermline Athletic	36	12	12	12	46	43	+3	48	
6	Queen of the South	36	11	10	15	46	52	−6	43	
7	St Mirren	36	9	12	15	52	56	−4	39	

Source: Soccerway
Rules for classification: 1) Points; 2) Goal difference; 3) Number of goals scored

==== Results by round ====
Round	1	2	3	4	5	6	7	8	9	10	11	12	13	14	15	16	17	18	19	20	21	22	23	24	25	26	27	28	29	30	31	32	33	34	35	36
Ground	H	A	A	H	H	A	H	A	A	H	A	H	A	A	H	H	A	H	A	A	H	H	A	A	H	H	A	H	A	H	H	A	A	H	H	A
Result	W	L	L	L	L	L	W	D	L	L	D	D	L	W	D	W	D	D	W	W	D	D	L	D	W	D	D	L	W	D	W	L	W	L	W	W
Position	2	4	7	7	8	9	7	8	8	8	8	9	9	8	9	7	7	7	6	6	5	6	6	6	6	6	6	6	6	6	6	6	5	5	5	5

Updated to match(es) played on 7 May 2017. Source: BBC Sport; DAFC.co.uk
A = Away; H = Home; W = Win; D = Draw; L = Loss

==== Results summary ====
Overall								Home						Away					
Pld	W	D	L	GF	GA	GD	Pts	W	D	L	GF	GA	GD	W	D	L	GF	GA	GD
36	12	12	12	46	43	+3	48	6	7	5	28	25	+3	6	5	7	18	18	0

Last updated: 7 May 2017.
Source: SPFL

=== Home attendances ===
Win Draw Loss

Comp	Date	Score	Opponent	Attendance
League Cup	19 July 2016	3–0	Arbroath	1,974
League Cup	26 July 2016	1–5	Inverness Caledonian Thistle	2,580
Championship	6 August 2016	4–3	Dumbarton	3,496
Championship	27 August 2016	0–1	Queen of the South	3,973
Championship	10 September 2016	1–3	Dundee United	5,563
Championship	24 September 2016	4–3	St Mirren	2,732
Challenge Cup	8 October 2016	2–1	Queen's Park	1,930
Championship	22 October 2016	1–3	Hibernian	7,622
Championship	5 November 2016	0–0	Raith Rovers	5,649
Challenge Cup	12 November 2016	0–1	Dundee United	2,576
Championship	10 December 2016	2–1	Greenock Morton	3,250
Championship	26 December 2016	1–1	Falkirk	6,134
Championship	14 January 2017	1–1	St Mirren	4,108
Championship	28 January 2017	1–1	Dundee United	4,670
Scottish Cup	11 February 2017	1–1	Hamilton Academical	2,945
Championship	4 March 2017	5–1	Dumbarton	3,496
Championship	7 March 2017	1–1	Queen of the South	2,653
Championship	18 March 2016	0–1	Ayr United	3,276
Championship	1 April 2017	1–1	Hibernian	7,058
Championship	8 April 2017	1–0	Raith Rovers	4,865
Championship	22 April 2017	1–2	Falkirk	5,076
Championship	29 April 2017	3—1	Greenock Morton	3,339
			Average league attendance:	4,438
			Total league attendance:	79,885
			Average total attendance:	3,995
			Total attendance:	91,890

Last updated: 29 April 2017
Source: Match reports in Results

== Awards ==
=== Club ===
Award	Player
DAFC Player of the Year	(Scotland) Sean Murdoch
Player's Player of the Year	(Scotland) Lee Ashcroft
Joe Nelson Young Player of the Year	(Scotland) Conner Duthie
Centenary Club Lifeline Player of the Year	(Scotland) Sean Murdoch
Kincardine Pars Supporters Club Player of the Year	(Scotland) Sean Murdoch

== Transfers ==
=== First team ===
==== Players in ====
Date	Position	No.	Nationality	Name	From	Fee	Ref.
16 May 2016	MF	8	(England)	Nat Wedderburn	Inverness CT	Free	
25 May 2016	DF	12	(Scotland)	Lee Ashcroft	Kilmarnock	Free	
8 July 2016	DF	19	(Scotland)	Euan Spark	Dundee United	Free	
18 July 2016	FW	20	(England)	Kallum Higginbotham	Kilmarnock	Free	
31 August 2016	FW	37	(Scotland)	Nicky Clark	(England) Bury	Free	
5 September 2016	FW	48	(France)	Farid El Alagui	Hibernian	Free	
31 December 2016	DF	22	(Republic of Ireland)	Callum Morris	Aberdeen	Free	

==== Players out ====
Date	Position	Nationality	Name	To	Fee	Ref.
14 May 2016	FW	(Scotland)	Ryan Wallace	Albion Rovers	Free	
15 May 2016	MF	(Scotland)	Shaun Byrne	Livingston	Free	
23 May 2016	DF	(Scotland)	Shaun Rooney	(England) York City	Free	
31 May 2016	DF	(Scotland)	Craig Reid	(Iceland) Keflavík	Free	
31 May 2016	MF	(England)	Josh Falkingham	(England) Darlington 1883	Free	
31 May 2016	MF	(Scotland)	Scott Robinson	East Fife	Free	
31 May 2016	FW	(France)	Faissal El Bakhtaoui	Dundee	Free	
23 January 2017	FW	(France)	Farid El Alagui	Ayr United	Free	

==== Loans in ====
Date	Position	No.	Nationality	Name	From	Duration	Ref.
13 June 2016	FW	17	(Scotland)	Gavin Reilly	Heart of Midlothian	End of season	
4 July 2016	FW	18	(Scotland)	Paul McMullan	Celtic	End of season	
1 September 2016	MF	21	(Scotland)	John Herron	(England) Blackpool	Initially 5 months, extended until the end of the season	

==== Loans out ====
Date	Position	No.	Nationality	Name	To	Duration	Ref.
23 September 2016	MF	15	(Scotland)	Lewis Spence	Brechin City	2 months	
20 January 2017	GK	30	(Scotland)	Cammy Gill	Arbroath	End of season (recalled on 7 March)	
27 January 2017	DF	19	(Scotland)	Euan Spark	(England) Berwick Rangers	End of season	
31 January 2017	MF	24	(Scotland)	Conner Duthie	Stenhousemuir	End of season	
31 January 2017	MF	34	(Scotland)	Scott Lochhead	Clyde	End of season	

=== Development squad ===
==== Players in ====
Date	Position	No.	Nationality	Name	From	Fee	Ref.
28 April 2016	DF	31	(Scotland)	Stuart Morrison	Fife Elite Football Academy	Free	
20 May 2016	MF	32	(Scotland)	Brandon Luke	Fife Elite Football Academy	Free	
20 May 2016	FW	33	(Scotland)	Callum Smith	Fife Elite Football Academy	Free	
30 July 2016	MF	34	(Scotland)	Scott Lochhead	Dundee United	Free	
11 August 2016	FW	—	(Scotland)	Ciaran Lafferty	Celtic	Free	

==== Players out ====
Date	Position	Nationality	Name	To	Fee	Ref.
27 April 2016	DF	(Scotland)	Jordan Orru	(England) Berwick Rangers	Free	
27 April 2016	MF	(Scotland)	Cammy McClair	Free agent	Released	
4 July 2016	FW	(Scotland)	PJ Crossan	Celtic	Undisclosed	
September 2016	MF	(Scotland)	John-James Henderson	Cowdenbeath	Free	
14 November 2016	FW	(Scotland)	James Thomas	Free agent	Released	
1 February 2017	FW	(Scotland)	Ciaran Lafferty	Free agent	Released	

== Contract extensions ==
=== First team ===
Date	Position	Nationality	Name	Length	Expiry	Ref.
7 April 2016	GK	(Scotland)	Sean Murdoch	2 years	2018	
7 April 2016	DF	(Scotland)	Ryan Williamson	2 years	2018	
14 April 2016	DF	(Scotland)	Lewis Martin	2 years	2018	
18 April 2016	FW	(Scotland)	David Hopkirk	2 years	2018	
19 April 2016	MF	(Scotland)	Michael Paton	1 year	2017	
22 April 2016	DF	(England)	Ben Richards-Everton	1 year	2017	
22 April 2016	DF	(England)	Jason Talbot	1 year	2017	
22 April 2016	MF	(England)	Joe Cardle	2 years	2018	
26 April 2016	MF	(Scotland)	Andy Geggan	1 year	2017	
28 April 2016	DF	(Scotland)	Callum Fordyce	3 months	2016	
16 May 2016	GK	(Scotland)	David Hutton	1 year	2017	
16 May 2016	MF	(Scotland)	Lewis Spence	1 year	2017	
25 May 2016	FW	(Scotland)	Michael Moffat	1 year	2017	
31 May 2016	MF	(Scotland)	Rhys McCabe	1 year	2017	
18 August 2016	DF	(Scotland)	Callum Fordyce	10 months	2017	

=== Development squad ===
Date	Position	Nationality	Name	Length	Expiry	Ref.
7 April 2016	GK	(Scotland)	Cammy Gill	1 year	2017	
28 April 2016	MF	(Scotland)	Evan Horne	1 year	2017	
28 April 2016	FW	(Scotland)	James Thomas	6 months	2017	
29 November 2016	MF	(Scotland)	Scott Lochhead	6 months	2017	
8 December 2016	DF	(Scotland)	Conner Duthie	1 year	2018	
13 January 2017	GK	(Scotland)	Cammy Gill	2 years	2019	
1 February 2017	MF	(Scotland)	Brandon Luke	18 months	2018	
