= List of Scottish football transfers summer 2016 =

This is a list of Scottish football transfers featuring at least one 2016–17 Scottish Premiership club or one 2016–17 Scottish Championship club which were completed during the summer 2016 transfer window. The window closed at midnight on 31 August 2016.

== List ==
| Date | Name | Moving from | Moving to | Fee |
|---|---|---|---|---|
| 28 April 2016 | Jordan Cairnie | Greenock Morton | Kilwinning Rangers | Free |
| 3 May 2016 | Alan Gow | St Mirren | Queen's Park | Free |
| 3 May 2016 | Cameron Howieson | St Mirren | Team Wellington | Free |
| 3 May 2016 | Jaison McGrath | St Mirren | Free agent | Free |
| 3 May 2016 | Steven Thompson | St Mirren | Retired | Free |
| 3 May 2016 | Keith Watson | St Mirren | St Johnstone | Free |
| 10 May 2016 | Robert Thomson | Brechin City | Dumbarton | Free |
| 10 May 2016 | Kyle Hutton | Queen of the South | St Mirren | Free |
| 10 May 2016 | Ryan McCord | Raith Rovers | Arbroath | Free |
| 11 May 2016 | Jayden Stockley | Bournemouth | Aberdeen | Free |
| 11 May 2016 | Kevin Cawley | Dumbarton | Alloa Athletic | Free |
| 16 May 2016 | Nat Wedderburn | Inverness Caledonian Thistle | Dunfermline Athletic | Free |
| 16 May 2016 | Barry Robson | Aberdeen | Retired | Free |
| 17 May 2016 | Darren Petrie | Raith Rovers | Stirling Albion | Free |
| 19 May 2016 | David Clarkson | Motherwell | St Mirren | Free |
| 19 May 2016 | Shaun Byrne | Dunfermline Athletic | Livingston | Free |
| 20 May 2016 | Jordan Kirkpatrick | Dumbarton | Alloa Athletic | Free |
| 23 May 2016 | Shaun Rooney | Dunfermline Athletic | York City | Free |
| 24 May 2016 | Iain Russell | Queen of the South | Airdrieonians | Free |
| 24 May 2016 | Andy Stirling | Stranraer | Dumbarton | Free |
| 24 May 2016 | Michael Miller | Greenock Morton | Livingston | Free |
| 25 May 2016 | Erik Čikoš | Slovan Bratislava | Ross County | Free |
| 25 May 2016 | Christopher Routis | Bradford City | Ross County | Free |
| 25 May 2016 | Kenny van der Weg | NAC Breda | Ross County | Free |
| 25 May 2016 | Aaron McCarey | Wolverhampton Wanderers | Ross County | Free |
| 25 May 2016 | Lee Ashcroft | Kilmarnock | Dunfermline Athletic | Free |
| 26 May 2016 | Blair Alston | Falkirk | St Johnstone | Free |
| 26 May 2016 | Craig Pettigrew | Stranraer | Dumbarton | Free |
| 27 May 2016 | Steven Rigg | Carlisle United | Queen of the South | Free |
| 27 May 2016 | Paul Cairney | Stranraer | Ayr United | Free |
| 28 May 2016 | Scott Agnew | St Mirren | Stranraer | Free |
| 30 May 2016 | Yordi Teijsse | Quick Boys | Dundee | Free |
| 31 May 2016 | Edward Ofere | Dundee United | Rosengård | Free |
| 31 May 2016 | Guy Demel | Dundee United | GS Consolat | Free |
| 31 May 2016 | Josh Falkingham | Dunfermline Athletic | Darlington 1883 | Free |
| 31 May 2016 | Błażej Augustyn | Heart of Midlothian | Ascoli | Free |
| 31 May 2016 | Miguel Pallardó | Heart of Midlothian | V-Varen Nagasaki | Free |
| 31 May 2016 | Conor Brennan | Kilmarnock | Raith Rovers | Free |
| 31 May 2016 | Julien Faubert | Kilmarnock | Inter Turku | Free |
| 31 May 2016 | Alex Henshall | Kilmarnock | Margate | Free |
| 31 May 2016 | Bobby Barr | Greenock Morton | Raith Rovers | Free |
| 1 June 2016 | Kristoffer Ajer | IK Start | Celtic | Undisclosed |
| 1 June 2016 | Chris Duggan | Partick Thistle | East Fife | Free |
| 1 June 2016 | James Vincent | Inverness Caledonian Thistle | Dundee | Free |
| 1 June 2016 | Danny Williams | Inverness Caledonian Thistle | Dundee | Free |
| 2 June 2016 | Ben Gordon | Livingston | St Mirren | Free |
| 3 June 2016 | Frank McKeown | Greenock Morton | Stranraer | Free |
| 3 June 2016 | Gary Oliver | Queen of the South | Greenock Morton | Free |
| 3 June 2016 | Andy Graham | Ayr United | Alloa Athletic | Free |
| 6 June 2016 | Frederic Frans | Partick Thistle | Lierse | Free |
| 6 June 2016 | Chris Johnston | Kilmarnock | Raith Rovers | Free |
| 6 June 2016 | James Craigen | Raith Rovers | Falkirk | Free |
| 7 June 2016 | Paul Paton | Dundee United | St Johnstone | Free |
| 8 June 2016 | Steven Saunders | Dumbarton | The New Saints | Free |
| 8 June 2016 | Jon Routledge | Dumbarton | The New Saints | Free |
| 8 June 2016 | Ryan Stevenson | Ayr United | Dumbarton | Free |
| 8 June 2016 | Jamie Hamill | Kilmarnock | Queen of the South | Free |
| 8 June 2016 | Mark O'Hara | Kilmarnock | Dundee | Free |
| 9 June 2016 | Scott Boden | Newport County | Inverness Caledonian Thistle | Free |
| 9 June 2016 | Colin Kazim-Richards | Celtic | Coritiba | Free |
| 9 June 2016 | Neil Martyniuk | St Johnstone | Edinburgh City | Free |
| 10 June 2016 | Liam Hughes | Inverness Caledonian Thistle | Barrow | Free |
| 13 June 2016 | Jim Goodwin | St Mirren | Alloa Athletic | Free |
| 13 June 2016 | Gavin Reilly | Heart of Midlothian | Dunfermline Athletic | Loan |
| 13 June 2016 | Robbie Muirhead | Dundee United | Heart of Midlothian | Free |
| 13 June 2016 | Conor Sammon | Derby County | Heart of Midlothian | Free |
| 13 June 2016 | Faycal Rherras | Sint-Truiden | Heart of Midlothian | Free |
| 14 June 2016 | Grant Anderson | Raith Rovers | Queen of the South | Free |
| 14 June 2016 | Ben Hall | Motherwell | Brighton & Hove Albion | Undisclosed |
| 14 June 2016 | Stewart Murdoch | Ross County | Dundee United | Free |
| 15 June 2016 | Callum Morris | Dundee United | Aberdeen | Free |
| 15 June 2016 | Joe Lewis | Cardiff City | Aberdeen | Free |
| 15 June 2016 | Neil Alexander | Heart of Midlothian | Aberdeen | Free |
| 16 June 2016 | Lewis Kidd | Queen of the South | Falkirk | Free |
| 16 June 2016 | Paul Gallacher | Partick Thistle | Heart of Midlothian | Free |
| 16 June 2016 | Danny Devine | Inverness Caledonian Thistle | Partick Thistle | Free |
| 16 June 2016 | David Syme | Kilmarnock | Partick Thistle | Free |
| 17 June 2016 | Clint Hill | Queens Park Rangers | Rangers | Free |
| 17 June 2016 | Lee Robinson | Rangers | Queen of the South | Free |
| 17 June 2016 | Anthony Stokes | Celtic | Blackburn Rovers | Free |
| 17 June 2016 | Jake Mulraney | Queens Park Rangers | Inverness Caledonian Thistle | Free |
| 17 June 2016 | Kevin McHattie | Kilmarnock | Raith Rovers | Free |
| 18 June 2016 | Michael Rose | Aberdeen | Ayr United | Free |
| 20 June 2016 | Aaron Lennox | Aberdeen | Raith Rovers | Loan |
| 21 June 2016 | Gary MacKenzie | Doncaster Rovers | St Mirren | Free |
| 21 June 2016 | David McGurn | Raith Rovers | Cowdenbeath | Free |
| 22 June 2016 | Paul McGinn | Dundee | Chesterfield | Free |
| 22 June 2016 | Luca Gasparotto | Rangers | Falkirk | Free |
| 22 June 2016 | Cammy Bell | Rangers | Dundee United | Free |
| 23 June 2016 | Niko Kranjčar | New York Cosmos | Rangers | Free |
| 23 June 2016 | Gary Miller | Partick Thistle | Plymouth Argyle | Free |
| 23 June 2016 | Jacob Blyth | Leicester City | Motherwell | Free |
| 23 June 2016 | Ben Heneghan | Chester | Motherwell | Free |
| 23 June 2016 | Richard Tait | Grimsby Town | Motherwell | Free |
| 23 June 2016 | Scott Gallacher | Alloa Athletic | St Mirren | Free |
| 24 June 2016 | Brett Long | Motherwell | Dundee United | Free |
| 24 June 2016 | Matt Gilks | Burnley | Rangers | Free |
| 24 June 2016 | Jay McEveley | Sheffield United | Ross County | Free |
| 24 June 2016 | Callum McFadzean | Sheffield United | Kilmarnock | Free |
| 24 June 2016 | Josh Webb | Aston Villa | Kilmarnock | Free |
| 24 June 2016 | Jamie Cobain | Newcastle United | Kilmarnock | Free |
| 24 June 2016 | Jonny Burn | Middlesbrough | Kilmarnock | Loan |
| 24 June 2016 | Mark Waddington | Stoke City | Kilmarnock | Loan |
| 24 June 2016 | Flo Bojaj | Huddersfield Town | Kilmarnock | Loan |
| 24 June 2016 | Will Boyle | Huddersfield Town | Kilmarnock | Loan |
| 24 June 2016 | Jordan Jones | Middlesbrough | Kilmarnock | Free |
| 24 June 2016 | Martin Smith | Sunderland | Kilmarnock | Free |
| 24 June 2016 | Oliver Davies | Swansea City | Kilmarnock | Loan |
| 24 June 2016 | Souleymane Coulibaly | Peterborough United | Kilmarnock | Free |
| 25 June 2016 | Nicky Clark | Rangers | Bury | Free |
| 25 June 2016 | Anthony O'Connor | Burton Albion | Aberdeen | Free |
| 27 June 2016 | Dean Brill | Inverness Caledonian Thistle | Motherwell | Free |
| 27 June 2016 | David Smith | Falkirk | Dumbarton | Free |
| 28 June 2016 | John Sutton | St Johnstone | St Mirren | Free |
| 28 June 2016 | Lewis Toshney | Raith Rovers | Dundee United | Undisclosed |
| 28 June 2016 | Daryll Meggatt | Dundee | Ayr United | Free |
| 28 June 2016 | Moussa Dembélé | Fulham | Celtic | Compensation |
| 28 June 2016 | Stefan Scepovic | Celtic | Getafe | Undisclosed |
| 29 June 2016 | Scott Robinson | Dunfermline Athletic | East Fife | Free |
| 29 June 2016 | Nicky Law | Rangers | Bradford City | Free |
| 29 June 2016 | Stephen Pearson | Motherwell | Atlético de Kolkata | Undisclosed |
| 29 June 2016 | Lee Hodson | Milton Keynes Dons | Rangers | Undisclosed |
| 29 June 2016 | Grant Holt | Rochdale | Hibernian | Free |
| 29 June 2016 | David Goodwillie | Aberdeen | Plymouth Argyle | Free |
| 30 June 2016 | Michael Duffy | Celtic | Dundee | Loan |
| 30 June 2016 | Ryan Wallace | Dunfermline Athletic | Albion Rovers | Free |
| 30 June 2016 | Shaun Rutherford | Queen of the South | Cowdenbeath | Free |
| 1 July 2016 | Jordan Rossiter | Liverpool | Rangers | Free |
| 1 July 2016 | Miles Storey | Swindon Town | Aberdeen | Free |
| 1 July 2016 | Joey Barton | Burnley | Rangers | Free |
| 1 July 2016 | Josh Windass | Accrington Stanley | Rangers | Compensation |
| 1 July 2016 | Matt Crooks | Accrington Stanley | Rangers | Compensation |
| 1 July 2016 | Joe McKee | Greenock Morton | Carlisle United | Free |
| 1 July 2016 | Michael Coulson | York City | St Johnstone | Free |
| 1 July 2016 | Ade Azeez | AFC Wimbledon | Partick Thistle | Free |
| 1 July 2016 | Jordan Hart | Annan Athletic | Ayr United | Free |
| 1 July 2016 | Ryan Conroy | Queen of the South | Airdrieonians | Free |
| 1 July 2016 | Tope Obadeyi | Kilmarnock | Dundee United | Free |
| 2 July 2016 | Mark Connolly | Kilmarnock | Crawley Town | Free |
| 3 July 2016 | Florent Sinama Pongolle | Dundee United | Chainat Hornbill | Free |
| 4 July 2016 | PJ Crossan | Dunfermline Athletic | Celtic | Undisclosed |
| 4 July 2016 | Paul McMullan | Celtic | Dunfermline Athletic | Loan |
| 5 July 2016 | Carl McHugh | Plymouth Argyle | Motherwell | Free |
| 5 July 2016 | Chris Dagnall | Hibernian | Crewe Alexandra | Free |
| 6 July 2016 | Peter MacDonald | Greenock Morton | Clyde | Free |
| 7 July 2016 | Craig Slater | Kilmarnock | Colchester United | Undisclosed |
| 7 July 2016 | Ross Laidlaw | Raith Rovers | Hibernian | Free |
| 8 July 2016 | Sean Mackie | Hibernian | Berwick Rangers | Loan |
| 8 July 2016 | Ben Stirling | Hibernian | Berwick Rangers | Loan |
| 8 July 2016 | Danny Rogers | Aberdeen | Falkirk | Loan |
| 8 July 2016 | Viktor Noring | Lyngby | Heart of Midlothian | Free |
| 8 July 2016 | Christian Nadé | Dumbarton | Stranraer | Free |
| 9 July 2016 | Josh Law | Motherwell | Oldham Athletic | Free |
| 9 July 2016 | Stuart Findlay | Celtic | Newcastle United | Free |
| 10 July 2016 | Barry Cuddihy | St Mirren | Annan Athletic | Free |
| 11 July 2016 | Jean-Yves Mvoto | Zawisza Bydgoszcz | Raith Rovers | Free |
| 11 July 2016 | Ziggy Gordon | Hamilton Academical | Partick Thistle | Free |
| 11 July 2016 | Morgaro Gomis | Heart of Midlothian | Kelantan | Free |
| 11 July 2016 | Ryan Porteous | Hibernian | Edinburgh City | Loan |
| 12 July 2016 | Kevin McNaughton | Wigan Athletic | Inverness Caledonian Thistle | Free |
| 12 July 2016 | Billy King | Heart of Midlothian | Inverness Caledonian Thistle | Loan |
| 12 July 2016 | Mark Oxley | Hibernian | Southend United | Free |
| 12 July 2016 | Darko Bodul | Dundee United | Amkar Perm | Free |
| 13 July 2016 | Cammy Smith | Aberdeen | Dundee United | Loan |
| 13 July 2016 | Gerry McLauchlan | Ayr United | Cowdenbeath | Free |
| 13 July 2016 | Gareth Rodger | St Johnstone | Brechin City | Free |
| 13 July 2016 | Elliot Ford | Raith Rovers | Brechin City | Free |
| 13 July 2016 | Jack Breslin | Celtic | Hamilton Academical | Free |
| 14 July 2016 | Wes Burns | Bristol City | Aberdeen | Loan |
| 14 July 2016 | Jordan McGregor | Hibernian | Hamilton Academical | Free |
| 14 July 2016 | Willo Flood | Aberdeen | Dundee United | Free |
| 14 July 2016 | Thomas Orr | Greenock Morton | Livingston | Loan |
| 14 July 2016 | Caolan McAleer | Airdrieonians | Greenock Morton | Free |
| 14 July 2016 | Yaw Osei | Chalfont St Peter | Raith Rovers | Free |
| 15 July 2016 | David Crawford | Alloa Athletic | Partick Thistle | Free |
| 15 July 2016 | Dale Carrick | Kilmarnock | Livingston | Free |
| 15 July 2016 | Jackson Irvine | Ross County | Burton Albion | £300,000 |
| 15 July 2016 | Stuart Carswell | St Mirren | Keflavík | Free |
| 15 July 2016 | Craig Reid | Dunfermline Athletic | Keflavík | Free |
| 15 July 2016 | Joel Coustrain | Sheffield United | Raith Rovers | Free |
| 16 July 2016 | Josh Todd | Annan Athletic | Dumbarton | Free |
| 16 July 2016 | Remi Matthews | Norwich City | Hamilton Academical | Loan |
| 17 July 2016 | Tom Walsh | Rangers | St. Mirren | Loan |
| 18 July 2016 | Kallum Higginbotham | Kilmarnock | Dunfermline Athletic | Free |
| 18 July 2016 | Massimo Donati | Bari | Hamilton Academical | Free |
| 19 July 2016 | Jamie Thomas | Burnley | Ayr United | Loan |
| 19 July 2016 | Craig Moore | Motherwell | Ayr United | Loan |
| 19 July 2016 | Lawrence Shankland | Aberdeen | St Mirren | Loan |
| 19 July 2016 | Scott Roberts | Rangers | Raith Rovers | Loan |
| 19 July 2016 | Joe Dodoo | Leicester City | Rangers | Free |
| 19 July 2016 | Michael McGovern | Hamilton Academical | Norwich City | Free |
| 19 July 2016 | Ryan Williams | Inverness Caledonian Thistle | Ottawa Fury | Free |
| 20 July 2016 | Tony Watt | Charlton Athletic | Heart of Midlothian | Loan |
| 21 July 2016 | Declan McManus | Fleetwood Town | Raith Rovers | Loan |
| 21 July 2016 | Rudi Skácel | Mladá Boleslav | Raith Rovers | Free |
| 22 July 2016 | Bjorn Johnsen | Litex Lovech | Heart of Midlothian | Free |
| 22 July 2016 | John Rankin | Dundee United | Falkirk | Free |
| 22 July 2016 | Will Vaulks | Falkirk | Rotherham United | Undisclosed |
| 23 July 2016 | Kevin O'Hara | Falkirk | East Fife | Loan |
| 24 July 2016 | Kolo Touré | Liverpool | Celtic | Free |
| 26 July 2016 | Ryan Hardie | Rangers | St Mirren | Loan |
| 26 July 2016 | Scott Brown | Aberdeen | Wycombe Wanderers | Free |
| 27 July 2016 | Kane Hemmings | Dundee | Oxford United | Undisclosed |
| 27 July 2016 | Gary Woods | Leyton Orient | Hamilton Academical | Free |
| 29 July 2016 | Georgios Sarris | Kayseri Erciyesspor | Hamilton Academical | Free |
| 29 July 2016 | Jamie Lindsay | Celtic | Greenock Morton | Loan |
| 1 August 2016 | Sean Kelly | St Mirren | AFC Wimbledon | Free |
| 2 August 2016 | Faissal El Bakhtaoui | Dunfermline Athletic | Dundee | Free |
| 3 August 2016 | Alan Martin | Hamilton Academical | Dumbarton | Free |
| 3 August 2016 | Daniel Harvie | Aberdeen | Dumbarton | Loan |
| 3 August 2016 | Ofir Marciano | Ashdod | Hibernian | Loan |
| 4 August 2016 | Scott Allan | Celtic | Rotherham United | Loan |
| 4 August 2016 | Stephen Dobbie | Bolton Wanderers | Queen of the South | Free |
| 5 August 2016 | David Bates | Raith Rovers | Rangers | Loan |
| 5 August 2016 | Jordan Thompson | Rangers | Raith Rovers | Loan |
| 7 August 2016 | Scott Sinclair | Aston Villa | Celtic | £3,000,000 |
| 8 August 2016 | Henri Anier | Dundee United | Kalmar | Free |
| 9 August 2016 | Kudus Oyenuga | Hartlepool United | Greenock Morton | Free |
| 9 August 2016 | Kevin Nisbet | Partick Thistle | Ayr United | Loan |
| 9 August 2016 | Krystian Nowak | Podbeskidzie Bielsko-Biała | Heart of Midlothian | Free |
| 10 August 2016 | Conrad Logan | Hibernian | Rochdale | Free |
| 10 August 2016 | Darnell Fisher | Celtic | Rotherham United | Undisclosed |
| 10 August 2016 | Carlton Cole | Celtic | Sacramento Republic | Free |
| 11 August 2016 | Sean McKirdy | Heart of Midlothian | Hamilton Academical | Free |
| 11 August 2016 | Josh Magennis | Kilmarnock | Charlton Athletic | £250,000 |
| 12 August 2016 | Greg Stewart | Dundee | Birmingham City | £500,000 |
| 12 August 2016 | Gary Harkins | Dundee | Ayr United | Free |
| 13 August 2016 | Dorus de Vries | Nottingham Forest | Celtic | Undisclosed |
| 13 August 2016 | George Green | Burnley | Kilmarnock | Loan |
| 19 August 2016 | Andrew Shinnie | Birmingham City | Hibernian | Loan |
| 19 August 2016 | Dapo Kayode | Dinamo Bucuresti | Kilmarnock | Free |
| 19 August 2016 | Luke Hendrie | Burnley | Kilmarnock | Loan |
| 19 August 2016 | Charlee Adams | Birmingham City | Kilmarnock | Loan |
| 19 August 2016 | Kévin Gomis | Nice | Dundee | Free |
| 19 August 2016 | Richard Foster | Ross County | St Johnstone | Free |
| 19 August 2016 | Thomas Konrad | Dundee | Vaduz | Free |
| 20 August 2016 | Brian Graham | Ross County | Hibernian | Free |
| 21 August 2016 | Joe Garner | Preston North End | Rangers | Undisclosed |
| 25 August 2016 | Lonsana Doumbouya | Cercle Brugge | Inverness Caledonian Thistle | Free |
| 25 August 2016 | Tim Chow | Wigan Athletic | Ross County | Free |
| 25 August 2016 | Dean Shiels | Rangers | Dundalk | Free |
| 25 August 2016 | Danny Seaborne | Partick Thistle | Hamilton Academical | Free |
| 26 August 2016 | Stefan Johansen | Celtic | Fulham | Undisclosed |
| 29 August 2016 | Frank van der Struijk | Willem II | Dundee United | Free |
| 29 August 2016 | William Edjenguélé | Veria | Dundee United | Free |
| 30 August 2016 | Cristian Gamboa | West Bromwich Albion | Celtic | Undisclosed |
| 31 August 2016 | Nicky Clark | Bury | Dunfermline Athletic | Free |
| 31 August 2016 | Brad McKay | St Johnstone | Inverness Caledonian Thistle | Free |
| 31 August 2016 | Larnell Cole | Fulham | Inverness Caledonian Thistle | Loan |
| 31 August 2016 | Joe Gormley | Peterborough United | St Johnstone | Loan |
| 31 August 2016 | Juanma | Heart of Midlothian | Murcia | Loan |
| 31 August 2016 | Philippe Senderos | Grasshopper Club Zürich | Rangers | Free |
| 31 August 2016 | Charlie Mulgrew | Celtic | Blackburn Rovers | Free |
| 31 August 2016 | Rory McKeown | Raith Rovers | Accrington Stanley | Free |
| 31 August 2016 | Wes Fletcher | Motherwell | The New Saints | Free |
| 31 August 2016 | Mathias Pogba | Partick Thistle | Sparta Rotterdam | Free |
| 31 August 2016 | Jamie Insall | Hibernian | East Fife | Loan |
| 31 August 2016 | Sam Stanton | Hibernian | Dumbarton | Loan |
| 31 August 2016 | Luke Watt | Motherwell | Stranraer | Loan |
| 31 August 2016 | John Herron | Blackpool | Dunfermline Athletic | Loan |
| 31 August 2016 | Saidy Janko | Celtic | Barnsley | Loan |
| 31 August 2016 | Andrew Black | Dundee | Fauldhouse United | Free |
| 31 August 2016 | James Maddison | Norwich City | Aberdeen | Loan |
| 31 August 2016 | Scott Boyd | Ross County | Kilmarnock | Loan |
| 31 August 2016 | Adam Barton | Portsmouth | Partick Thistle | Undisclosed |
| 31 August 2016 | Tony Andreu | Norwich City | Dundee United | Loan |
| 31 August 2016 | Cammy Ballantyne | Dundee United | Montrose | Loan |
| 31 August 2016 | Justin Johnson | Dundee United | York City | Loan |
| 31 August 2016 | Marvin Johnson | Motherwell | Oxford United | Undisclosed |
| 31 August 2016 | Luka Belić | West Ham United | Motherwell | Loan |
| 31 August 2016 | Ryan Bowman | Gateshead | Motherwell | Undisclosed |

== See also ==
- List of Scottish football transfers winter 2015–16
- List of Scottish football transfers winter 2016–17
