= List of Scottish football transfers winter 2016–17 =

This is a list of Scottish football transfers featuring at least one 2016–17 Scottish Premiership club or one 2016–17 Scottish Championship club which were completed after the summer 2016 transfer window closed and before the end of the 2016–17 season.

== List ==
Date	Name	Moving from	Moving to	Fee
2 September 2016	Robbie Thomson	Queen of the South	Hamilton Academical	Free
2 September 2016	Chris Robertson	Ross County	AFC Wimbledon	Free
2 September 2016	Jack Leitch	Motherwell	Airdrieonians	Free
2 September 2016	Conrad Balatoni	Kilmarnock	Ayr United	Free
5 September 2016	Farid El Alagui	Hibernian	Dunfermline Athletic	Free
5 September 2016	Tom Hateley	Slask Wroclaw	Dundee	Free
9 September 2016	Ryan Dow	Dundee United	Ross County	Free
12 September 2016	Nathan Tyson	Doncaster Rovers	Kilmarnock	Free
15 September 2016	Dave Mackay	St Johnstone	Retired	Free
15 September 2016	Gavin Gunning	Dundee United	Greenock Morton	Free
16 September 2016	Thorsten Stuckmann	Doncaster Rovers	Partick Thistle	Free
16 September 2016	Ben Gordon	St Mirren	Alloa Athletic	Loan
23 September 2016	Andy Murdoch	Rangers	Greenock Morton	Free
23 September 2016	Liam Smith	Heart of Midlothian	Raith Rovers	Loan
23 September 2016	Lewis Spence	Dunfermline Athletic	Brechin City	Loan
25 September 2016	Darren Jamieson	Livingston	Hamilton Academical	Free
27 September 2016	Chris Burke	Nottingham Forest	Ross County	Free
28 September 2016	Neal Eardley	Birmingham City	Hibernian	Free
8 October 2016	Alex Cooper	St Mirren	Cheltenham Town	Free
12 October 2016	Dan Carmichael	Hibernian	Queen of the South	Free
12 October 2016	Lennard Sowah	Hamburg	Hamilton Academical	Free
26 October 2016	Marcus Haber	Crewe Alexandra	Dundee	Free
4 November 2016	Robbie Crawford	Rangers	Raith Rovers	Free
11 November 2016	Scott McKenna	Aberdeen	Ayr United	Loan
30 November 2016	Kyle Hutton	St Mirren	Airdrieonians	Loan
16 December 2016	Kris Commons	Celtic	Hibernian	Loan
16 December 2016	Connor McLennan	Aberdeen	Brechin City	Loan
31 December 2016	Callum Morris	Aberdeen	Dunfermline Athletic	Free
31 December 2016	Chris Humphrey	Preston North End	Hibernian	Free
1 January 2017	Ryan Hardie	Rangers	Raith Rovers	Loan
1 January 2017	Joe Thomson	Celtic	Queen of the South	Loan
1 January 2017	Dom Thomas	Motherwell	Queen of the South	Loan
2 January 2017	Ryan Stevenson	Dumbarton	Raith Rovers	Free
2 January 2017	Christian Nade	Stranraer	Dumbarton	Free
2 January 2017	Joey Barton	Rangers	Burnley	Free
3 January 2017	Craig Storie	Aberdeen	St Mirren	Loan
3 January 2017	Mark Ridgers	Orlando City B	Partick Thistle	Free
3 January 2017	Robbie Thomson	Hamilton Academical	Falkirk	Free
4 January 2017	Andrew McNeil	Greenock Morton	Guangzhou R&F (coach)	Free
4 January 2017	Dean Ebbe	Bluebell United	Inverness Caledonian Thistle	Free
4 January 2017	Lewis Vaughan	Raith Rovers	Dumbarton	Loan
4 January 2017	Liam Gordon	St Johnstone	Peterhead	Loan
4 January 2017	Aaron Comrie	St Johnstone	Peterhead	Loan
5 January 2017	John Rankin	Falkirk	Queen of the South	Free
5 January 2017	Gavin Gunning	Greenock Morton	Grimsby Town	Free
5 January 2017	Stuart Carswell	Keflavík	Dumbarton	Free
6 January 2017	Thomas Mikkelsen	OB	Dundee United	Loan
6 January 2017	Mark Millar	Queen of the South	Livingston	Free
6 January 2017	Frazer Wright	Dumbarton	Stirling Albion	Free
6 January 2017	Conor Quigley	Dundee	Stirling Albion	Loan
6 January 2017	Connor McLaren	St Johnstone	Stirling Albion	Loan
8 January 2017	Alim Ozturk	Heart of Midlothian	Boluspor	Free
9 January 2017	Lennard Sowah	Hamilton Academical	Heart of Midlothian	Free
9 January 2017	Aaron Hughes	Kerala Blasters	Heart of Midlothian	Free
9 January 2017	Emerson Hyndman	Bournemouth	Rangers	Loan
9 January 2017	Callum Roberts	Newcastle United	Kilmarnock	Loan
9 January 2017	Freddie Woodman	Newcastle United	Kilmarnock	Loan
9 January 2017	Sean Longstaff	Newcastle United	Kilmarnock	Loan
11 January 2017	Craig Pettigrew	Dumbarton	Stranraer	Free
11 January 2017	Lawrence Shankland	Aberdeen	Greenock Morton	Loan
12 January 2017	Eoghan O'Connell	Celtic	Walsall	Loan
12 January 2017	Eboue Kouassi	Krasnodar	Celtic	£3,000,000
12 January 2017	David Bates	Raith Rovers	Rangers	Undisclosed
12 January 2017	Scott Roberts	Rangers	Raith Rovers	Free
12 January 2017	Juanma	Heart of Midlothian	V-Varen Nagasaki	Free
12 January 2017	Rory Loy	Dundee	St Mirren	Loan
12 January 2017	Neal Eardley	Hibernian	Northampton Town	Free
12 January 2017	Liam Henderson	Falkirk	Cowdenbeath	Loan
12 January 2017	Pål Fjelde	Bryne FK	St Mirren	Free
12 January 2017	Scott Mercer	East Fife	Queen of the South	Undisclosed
12 January 2017	Jon Toral	Arsenal	Rangers	Loan
12 January 2017	Matt Crooks	Rangers	Scunthorpe United	Loan
12 January 2017	Tom Lang	Rangers	Dumbarton	Free
13 January 2017	Calum Gallagher	St Mirren	Dumbarton	Free
13 January 2017	Theo Archibald	Celtic	Albion Rovers	Loan
13 January 2017	Matty Smith	Dundee United	Montrose	Loan
14 January 2017	Igor Rossi Branco	Heart of Midlothian	Al-Faisaly	Undisclosed
15 January 2017	Otso Virtanen	Hibernian	KuPS	Free
16 January 2017	Henri Anier	Kalmar	Inverness Caledonian Thistle	Free
16 January 2017	Karleigh Osborne	Plymouth Argyle	Kilmarnock	Free
16 January 2017	Josh Todd	Dumbarton	St Mirren	Free
17 January 2017	Erik Čikoš	Ross County	Monopoli	Free
17 January 2017	Malaury Martin	Lillestrøm	Heart of Midlothian	Free
18 January 2017	Tom Walsh	Rangers	Limerick	Free
18 January 2017	Andraž Struna	PAS Giannina	Heart of Midlothian	Free
18 January 2017	Jim O'Brien	Shrewsbury Town	Ross County	Loan
18 January 2017	Jason Naismith	St Mirren	Ross County	Undisclosed
18 January 2017	Fraser Aird	Rangers	Falkirk	Free
19 January 2017	Ryan Booth	Dundee United	Inverurie Loco Works	Free
19 January 2017	Robbie Muirhead	Heart of Midlothian	Milton Keynes Dons	Undisclosed
20 January 2017	Kristoffer Ajer	Celtic	Kilmarnock	Loan
20 January 2017	Jake Pickard	Queen of the South	Washington	Free
20 January 2017	Donald McCallum	Dumbarton	Arbroath	Loan
20 January 2017	Billy O'Brien	Manchester City	St Mirren	Loan
20 January 2017	Stelios Demetriou	Doxa Katokopias	St Mirren	Free
20 January 2017	Milan Lalkovic	Portsmouth	Ross County	Loan
20 January 2017	Oscar Gobern	Mansfield Town	Ross County	Free
20 January 2017	Cammy Gill	Dunfermline Athletic	Arbroath	Loan
24 January 2017	Grant Anderson	Queen of the South	Peterhead	Free
24 January 2017	Souleymane Coulibaly	Kilmarnock	Al Ahly	£800,000
24 January 2017	Niall Keown	Reading	Partick Thistle	Loan
24 January 2017	Ryan Christie	Celtic	Aberdeen	Loan
25 January 2017	Thomas Orr	Greenock Morton	BSC Glasgow	Loan
26 January 2017	Ziggy Gordon	Partick Thistle	Jagiellonia Białystok	Free
26 January 2017	Scott Gallacher	St Mirren	Hibernian	Free
26 January 2017	Cammy Smith	Aberdeen	St Mirren	Loan
26 January 2017	Elliott Frear	Forest Green Rovers	Motherwell	Undisclosed
27 January 2017	Kyle McAllister	St Mirren	Derby County	Undisclosed
27 January 2017	Dylan Bikey	Stirling Albion	Heart of Midlothian	Free
27 January 2017	Euan Spark	Dunfermline Athletic	Berwick Rangers	Loan
27 January 2017	Blair Adams	Cambridge United	Hamilton Academical	Free
27 January 2017	Russell Griffiths	Everton	Motherwell	Loan
27 January 2017	Zak Jules	Reading	Motherwell	Loan
27 January 2017	Richard Roy	Hamilton Academical	Broughty Athletic	Free
28 January 2017	Stephen McGinn	Wycombe Wanderers	St Mirren	Free
28 January 2017	Moha El Ouriachi	Stoke City	Heart of Midlothian	Loan
30 January 2017	Owen Moxon	Queen of the South	Gretna 2008	Loan
30 January 2017	Alexandros Tziolis	PAOK	Heart of Midlothian	Free
30 January 2017	Tasos Avlonitis	Olympiacos	Heart of Midlothian	Free
30 January 2017	Esmaël Gonçalves	Anorthosis Famagusta	Heart of Midlothian	£170,000
30 January 2017	Nicky Low	Dundee	Derry City	Loan
30 January 2017	Jak Alnwick	Port Vale	Rangers	Undisclosed
30 January 2017	Giannis Skondras	PAOK	Hamilton Academical	Free
30 January 2017	Matty Allan	Dundee	Montrose	Loan
30 January 2017	Christopher McLaughlin	Ross County	Forfar Athletic	Loan
31 January 2017	Declan McDaid	Partick Thistle	Ayr United	Free
31 January 2017	Matt Gilks	Rangers	Wigan Athletic	Undisclosed
31 January 2017	Billy McKay	Wigan Athletic	Inverness Caledonian Thistle	Loan
31 January 2017	Dean Brill	Motherwell	Colchester United	Free
31 January 2017	Matthew Smyth	Dundee	Arbroath	Loan
31 January 2017	Richard Murray	Queen of the South	Dalbeattie Star	Loan
31 January 2017	Jesse Akubuine	Queen of the South	Dalbeattie Star	Loan
31 January 2017	David Syme	Partick Thistle	Raith Rovers	Free
31 January 2017	Conner Duthie	Dunfermline Athletic	Stenhousemuir	Loan
31 January 2017	Conor Sammon	Heart of Midlothian	Kilmarnock	Loan
31 January 2017	Joshua Umerah	Charlton Athletic	Kilmarnock	Loan
31 January 2017	Scott Boyd	Ross County	Kilmarnock	Free
31 January 2017	Henrik Ojamaa	Go Ahead Eagles	Dundee	Loan
31 January 2017	Marc Klok	Oldham Athletic	Dundee	Free
31 January 2017	Yordi Teijsse	Dundee	Wuppertaler SV	Loan
31 January 2017	Devlin MacKay	Kilmarnock	Berwick Rangers	Loan
31 January 2017	Oliver Pain	Sunderland	Motherwell	Loan
31 January 2017	Luke Watt	Motherwell	East Fife	Loan
31 January 2017	Shea Gordon	Sheffield United	Motherwell	Free
31 January 2017	Justin Johnson	Dundee United	Othellos Athienou	Free
31 January 2017	Jordan Stewart	St Mirren	Annan Athletic	Loan
31 January 2017	Kalvin Orsi	St Mirren	Queen's Park	Loan
31 January 2017	Broque Watson	Celtic	Cumbernauld Colts	Loan
31 January 2017	Aidan McIlduff	Celtic	Queen's Park	Loan
31 January 2017	Ross Munro	Ross County	Brora Rangers	Loan
31 January 2017	Jamie McCart	Celtic	Inverness Caledonian Thistle	Loan
31 January 2017	Lonsana Doumbouya	Inverness Caledonian Thistle	SKN St. Pölten	Free
31 January 2017	Alisdair Sutherland	Inverness Caledonian Thistle	Elgin City	Free
31 January 2017	Robert Buchanan	Heart of Midlothian	Cowdenbeath	Loan
31 January 2017	Dario Zanatta	Heart of Midlothian	Queen's Park	Loan
31 January 2017	Jordan McGregor	Hamilton Academical	Airdrieonians	Loan
31 January 2017	Josh Stachini	Motherwell	Ashton United	Free
31 January 2017	Stephen Forster	Inverness Caledonian Thistle	Fort William	Loan
31 January 2017	Ryan Sinnamon	Rangers	Elgin City	Free
31 January 2017	Jason Banton	Crawley Town	Partick Thistle	Loan
31 January 2017	Clive Smith	Preston North End	St Johnstone	Loan
31 January 2017	Alex Nicholls	Barnet	Dundee United	Loan
31 January 2017	Joe McKee	Carlisle United	Falkirk	Loan
31 January 2017	Adam Eckersley	Edmonton	St Mirren	Free
31 January 2017	Harry Davis	Crewe Alexandra	St Mirren	Loan
31 January 2017	Tope Obadeyi	Dundee United	Oldham Athletic	Free
31 January 2017	Michael Duffy	Celtic	Dundalk	Free
31 January 2017	Leo Fasan	Celtic	Port Vale	Loan
31 January 2017	Scott Lochhead	Dunfermline Athletic	Clyde	Loan
31 January 2017	Lewis Allan	Hibernian	Edinburgh City	Loan
2 February 2017	Stephen Pearson	Atlético de Kolkata	Motherwell	Free
3 February 2017	Sean McKenzie	Cumnock Juniors	Ayr United	Free
3 February 2017	Amadou Kassaraté	Dumbarton	Stranraer	Loan
7 February 2017	Luke Donnelly	Celtic	Greenock Morton	Loan
7 February 2017	Farid El Alagui	Dunfermline Athletic	Ayr United	Free
15 February 2017	Thorsten Stuckmann	Partick Thistle	Chesterfield	Free
16 February 2017	Louis Laing	Motherwell	Inverness Caledonian Thistle	Free
16 February 2017	Nadir Çiftçi	Celtic	Pogoń Szczecin	Loan
17 February 2017	Sean McKirdy	Hamilton Academical	Berwick Rangers	Loan
25 February 2017	Alex Gogić	Swansea City	Hamilton Academical	Free
1 March 2017	Efe Ambrose	Celtic	Hibernian	Loan
1 March 2017	Brian McLean	Brunei DPMM	Hibernian	Free
1 March 2017	Deniz Mehmet	Falkirk	Port Vale	Free
8 March 2017	Pavol Penksa	Tatran Prešov	Raith Rovers	Free
9 March 2017	Ryan Stevenson	Raith Rovers	Retired	Free
14 March 2017	David Syme	Raith Rovers	Cowdenbeath	Loan
17 March 2017	Callum McFadzean	Kilmarnock	Alfreton Town	Free
23 March 2017	Josh Webb	Kilmarnock	Kidderminster Harriers	Free
24 March 2017	David Templeton	Rangers	Hamilton Academical	Free
24 March 2017	Connor McManus	Celtic	Queen of the South	Loan
25 March 2017	Joel Coustrain	Raith Rovers	Shamrock Rovers	Free
27 March 2017	Wato Kuaté	Asteras Tripolis	Dundee United	Free
30 March 2017	Mark Brown	Dumbarton	Retired	Free
31 March 2017	Joe Nuttall	Aberdeen	Dumbarton	Loan
31 March 2017	Dylan Bikey	Heart of Midlothian	Stirling Albion	Loan
31 March 2017	Danny Handling	Hibernian	Raith Rovers	Loan
31 March 2017	Kieran Duffie	Falkirk	East Fife	Free
7 April 2017	Marc Klok	Dundee	PSM Makassar	Free
10 April 2017	Danny Seaborne	Hamilton Academical	Exeter City	Free
25 April 2017	Nick van der Velden	Dundee United	Bali United	Free
12 May 2017	Faycal Rherras	Heart of Midlothian	KV Mechelen	Free

== See also ==
- List of Scottish football transfers summer 2016
- List of Scottish football transfers summer 2017
