= Nat Wedderburn =

English footballer

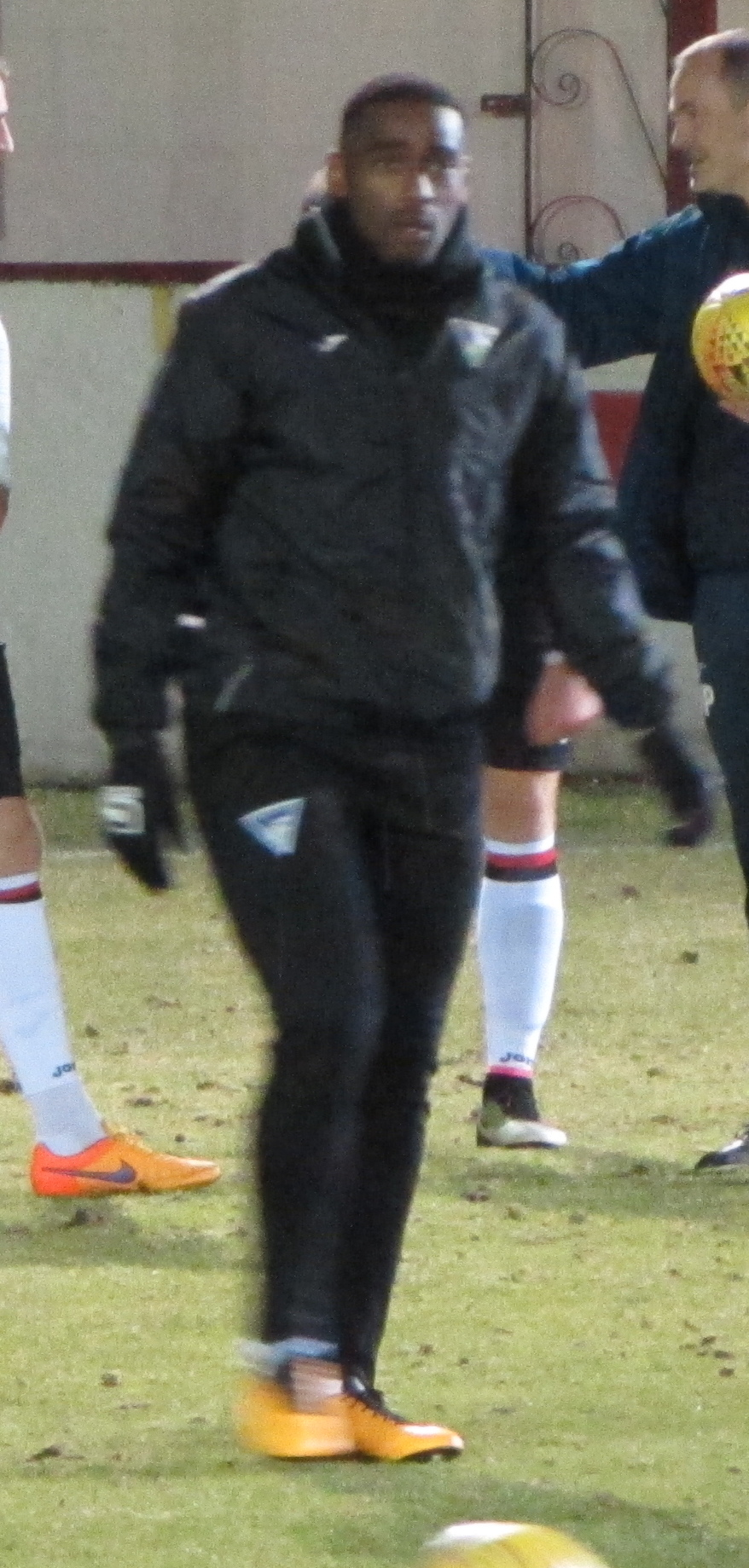
- Wedderburn with Dunfermline.

Personal information
- Full name: Nathaniel Carl Wedderburn
- Date of birth: 30 June 1991 (age 35)
- Place of birth: Wolverhampton, England
- Position: Midfielder

Team information
- Current team: Cowdenbeath
- Number: 6

Youth career
- 2005–2007: Stoke City

Senior career*
Years	Team	Apps	(Gls)
2007–2010	Stoke City	0	(0)
2008–2009	→ Notts County (loan)	11	(0)
2009	→ Hereford United (loan)	3	(0)
2010–2012	Northampton Town	40	(0)
2012–2013	Corby Town	42	(2)
2013–2015	Cowdenbeath	74	(2)
2015–2016	Inverness Caledonian Thistle	19	(0)
2016–2018	Dunfermline Athletic	67	(1)
2018–2019	Raith Rovers	43	(1)
2019–2020	Airdrieonians	26	(1)
2020–2021	Dumbarton	27	(2)
2021–2025	Stenhousemuir	161	(5)
2025-	Cowdenbeath	0	(0)

International career
2009–2010	England U19	4	(0)
- * Club domestic league appearances and goals as of 14:39, 21 April 2025 (UTC)

Nathaniel Carl Wedderburn (born 30 June 1991) is an English footballer who plays as a midfielder for Scottish Lowland League side Cowdenbeath F.C. He has previously played for Stoke City, Notts County, Hereford United, Northampton Town, Corby Town, Cowdenbeath, Inverness Caledonian Thistle, Dunfermline Athletic, Raith Rovers, Airdrieonians and Dumbarton.

== Career ==
=== Stoke City ===
Wedderburn won academy player of the year at Stoke City in his first season at the Potters, playing regularly with the youth team and reserves, he also travelled with the first team during this season but didn't make the bench. In his second season as an academy he took the captain's armband for the season, during this season he was named on the bench in every League cup game but without making his debut. After some impressive performances in Stoke's Academy side which saw Wedderburn sign his first professional contract at Stoke lasting one and a half years. After this, he moved to Notts County on loan. Wedderburn made his league debut whilst on loan at Notts County on 6 December 2008, playing in the 1–0 home win over Morecambe. After extending his loan spell for the second time before 25 January 2009, his loan spell was, once again, extended until 3 March 2009. He went on to make a further 9 league appearances for County before returning to Stoke in March 2009.

On 17 September 2009, Wedderburn was called up to the England Under 19 squad three European U19 Championship qualifiers in October 2009. Wedderburn signed on loan for Hereford United in November 2009. After making three appearances, Wedderburn returned to his parent club. Wedderburn was released by Stoke at the end of the 2009–10 season.

=== Northampton Town ===
Following his release from Stoke, Wedderburn signed for League Two side Northampton Town on a two-year contract. After joining the club, Wedderburn says Manager Ian Sampson was the reason he joined the "Cobblers".

He made his debut for the club, on 14 August 2010, in a 1–1 draw with Accrington Stanley. In the second round of League Cup, Wedderburn registered an assist from the corner to allow Andy Holt equalise against Reading and the match would go to a penalty-shootout after ending 3–3 in the regular time, but in the end, Northampton won 4–3 on penalties. In 2010–11 season, Wedderburn made thirty-seven appearances in all competitions.

In 2011–12 season, under new managers Gary Johnson and Aidy Boothroyd, Wedderburn playing time was limited, as he made two appearances. The main factor was suffering injuries like two sets of ruptured ankle ligaments, a hamstring injury and two calf strains. After making a recovery from an ankle injury, manager Johnson placed him on loan list to gain first team experience. In January transfer Window, Wedderburn was expected to leave the club, but nothing materialised. Wedderburn was frozen out of the first team by Johnson. Wedderburn played his first match since September, in a 3–1 loss against Crawley Town on 17 April 2012 (which turned out to be his last appearance for the club). After the match, he thought his Northampton's career had ended, after his bad luck in the 2011–12 season and said he was delighted to make his return.

In May 2012, Wedderburn was released from Northampton after being told his contract would not be renewed.

=== Corby Town ===
On 13 August 2012, Corby Town, and former Northampton Town boss, Ian Sampson announced in a post match interview that he was hoping to secure the signing of Wedderburn before the start of the league season.

=== Cowdenbeath ===
In July 2013, Wedderburn signed for Championship side Cowdenbeath after a trial spell.

Wedderburn scored on debut in the first round of the Scottish Challenge Cup, in a 3–1 loss against Dunfermline Athletic. He made his league debut in the opening game of the season, in a 2–0 loss against Greenock Morton. Wedderburn then scored his first league goal of the season, in a 4–2 loss against Hamilton Academical. Wedderburn went to make 40 appearances, scoring twice in all competitions, having played in different positions in defence and midfield.

In the 2014–15 season, Wedderburn continued to be in the first team and captained Cowdenbeath against Raith Rovers on 30 August 2014 before coming off in the after 31 minutes, due to an injury. Wedderburn scored his first goal of the season, in a 2–1 loss against Livingston on 11 April 2015. However, the club was relegated to League One, as he made 34 appearances scoring once in all competitions.

=== Inverness Caledonian Thistle ===
On 18 June 2015 Wedderburn joined Scottish Premiership side Inverness Caledonian Thistle.

=== Dunfermline Athletic ===
After just one season with Inverness Caledonian Thistle, Wedderburn signed a pre-contract with Scottish Championship side Dunfermline Athletic – becoming their first signing of the summer. Wedderburn previously played for Fife rivals Cowdenbeath before transferring to the Caledonian Stadium.

=== Raith Rovers ===
In July 2018, Wedderburn joined another Fife club, signing a one-year contract with Raith Rovers with the option of a further year if the club earned promotion from League One.

=== Airdrieonians ===
On 10 June 2019, Wedderburn signed for Airdrieonians. He made 26 appearances and scoring twice in games against Forfar and Queens Park before leaving the club in the summer of 2020.

=== Dumbarton ===
After leaving Airdrie, Wedderburn signed for Dumbarton in September 2020. He scored his first goal for the club, the winner, against Cove Rangers in December 2020.

=== Stenhousemuir ===
After a season at the Rock, Wedderburn joined Scottish League Two side Stenhousemuir. In his first season at Stenhousemuir Wedderburn won players player and fans player of the year awards. Season 23/24 Wedderburn played a vital part in making history, helping Stenhousemuir secure their first league title in their 140 year history. He made team of the year that season and also nominated in a four man shortlist for player of the year.

== Career statistics ==
As of 22:48, 20 May 2021 (UTC)

Club statistics
Club	Season	League			National Cup		League Cup		Other		Total	
Club	Season	Division	Apps	Goals	Apps	Goals	Apps	Goals	Apps	Goals	Apps	Goals
Stoke City	2008–09	Premier League	0	0	0	0	0	0	0	0	0	0
Notts County (loan)	2008–09	League Two	9	0	2	0	0	0	0	0	11	0
Hereford United (loan)	2009–10	League Two	3	0	0	0	0	0	0	0	3	0
Northampton Town	2010–11	League Two	31	0	2	0	4	0	1 (Note: Appearances in the Football League Trophy)	0	38	0
Northampton Town	2011–12	League Two	2	0	0	0	0	0	0	0	2	0
Northampton Town	Total		33	0	2	0	4	0	1	0	40	0
Corby Town	2012–13	Conference North	42	2	1	0	0	0	2 (Note: Appearances in the FA Trophy)	0	45	2
Cowdenbeath	2013–14	Scottish Championship	34	1	1	0	1	0	5 (Note: One appearance and one goal in the Scottish Challenge Cup and four appearances in the Scottish Championship play-offs)	1	41	2
Cowdenbeath	2014–15	Scottish Championship	29	1	2	0	2	0	1 (Note: Appearances in the Scottish Challenge Cup)	0	34	1
Cowdenbeath	Total		63	2	3	0	3	0	6	1	75	3
Inverness Caledonian Thistle	2015–16	Scottish Premiership	15	0	2	0	0	0	2 (Note: Appearances in the UEFA Europa League)	0	19	0
Dunfermline Athletic	2016–17	Scottish Championship	24	1	4	0	3	0	0	0	31	1
Dunfermline Athletic	2017–18	Scottish Championship	27	0	2	0	4	0	3 (Note: One appearance in the Scottish Challenge Cup and two appearances in the Scottish Premiership play-offs)	0	36	0
Dunfermline Athletic	Total		51	1	6	0	7	0	3	0	67	1
Raith Rovers	2018–19	Scottish League One	33	0	3	0	2	0	5 (Note: Two appearances and one goal in the Scottish Challenge Cup and three appearances in the Scottish Championship play-offs)	1	43	1
Airdrieonians	2019–20	Scottish League One	20	1	1	0	4	1	1	0	26	2
Dumbarton	2020–21	Scottish League One	18	2	2	0	3	0	4	0	27	2
Stenhousemuir	2021–22	Scottish League Two	0	0	0	0	0	0	0	0	0	0
Career total			287	8	22	0	23	1	24	2	356	11
