= List of Dunfermline Athletic F.C. managers =

This is a list of all managers of Dunfermline Athletic Football Club.

== Managerial history ==
Information correct as of match played 14 May 2026. Only official Scottish League, Scottish Cup, Scottish League Cup, Scottish Challenge Cup and European Competition matches are counted

Key

Key to record:
- P = Matches played
- W = Matches won
- D = Matches drawn
- L = Matches lost
- Win % = Win ratio

*	Caretaker manager

List of Dunfermline Athletic F.C. managers
Name	From	To	Duration	P	W	D	L	Win %	Ref
(Northern Ireland) Neil Lennon	21 March 2025	Present	1 year, 54 days	53	24	11	18	45.28	
(Scotland) Michael Tidser	17 January 2025	17 March 2025	59 days	11	3	2	6	27.27	
(Scotland) John McLaughlan*	23 December 2024	17 January 2025	25 days	3	1	1	1	33.33	
(Northern Ireland) James McPake	24 May 2022	23 December 2024	2 years, 213 days	113	50	30	33	44.25	
(Scotland) John Hughes	12 November 2021	19 May 2022	188 days	25	6	8	11	24	
(Scotland) Greg Shields & Steven Whittaker^{*}	31 October 2021	12 November 2021	11 days	2	1	0	1	50	
(Scotland) Peter Grant	28 May 2021	31 October 2021	156 days	18	3	7	8	16.67	
(Scotland) Stevie Crawford	10 January 2019	18 May 2021	2 years, 128 days	88	33	21	34	37.5	
(Scotland) Allan Johnston	8 May 2015	9 January 2019	3 years, 246 days	168	79	44	45	47.02	
(Scotland) John Potter	16 December 2014	30 April 2015	135 days	20	5	6	9	25	
(Scotland) Jim Jefferies	21 March 2012	16 December 2014	2 years, 270 days	124	54	22	48	43.55	
(Scotland) Jim McIntyre	3 January 2008	16 March 2012	4 years, 73 days	189	73	51	65	38.62	
(Scotland) Jim McIntyre^{*}	4 December 2007	3 January 2008	30 days	6	4	2	0	66.67	
(Republic of Ireland) Stephen Kenny	10 November 2006	4 December 2007	1 year, 21 days	50	15	11	24	30	
(Scotland) Craig Robertson^{*}	26 October 2006	10 November 2006	15 days	2	0	1	1	0	
(Scotland) Jim Leishman	3 May 2005	26 October 2006	1 year, 176 days	60	16	12	32	26.67	
(Scotland) David Hay	17 June 2004	3 May 2005	320 days	42	8	12	22	19.05	
(Scotland) Jimmy Calderwood	30 November 1999	28 May 2004	4 years, 180 days	202	77	47	79	38.12	
(Northern Ireland) Jimmy Nicholl^{*}	2 November 1999	30 November 1999	28 days	4	3	1	0	75	
(Scotland) Dick Campbell	6 January 1999	2 November 1999	300 days	31	9	11	11	29.03	
(Scotland) Bert Paton	10 June 1993	6 January 1999	5 years, 210 days	240	102	68	70	42.5	
(Scotland) Jocky Scott	20 September 1991	19 May 1993	1 year, 241 days	96	28	20	48	29.17	
(Scotland) Iain Munro	27 July 1990	17 September 1991	1 year, 52 days	42	11	12	19	26.19	
(Scotland) Jim Leishman	17 October 1983	31 May 1990	6 years, 226 days	314	132	80	102	42.04	
(Scotland) Tom Forsyth	20 September 1982	17 October 1983	1 year, 27 days	47	9	18	20	19.15	
(Scotland) Jimmy Thomson^{*}	2 September 1982	20 September 1982	18 days						
(Scotland) Pat Stanton	16 December 1980	2 September 1982	1 year, 260 days	89	25	23	41	28.09	
(Scotland) Harry Melrose	20 September 1975	9 December 1980	5 years, 80 days	216	81	70	65	37.5	
(Scotland) Jimmy Thomson^{*}	31 August 1975	20 September 1975	20 days						
(Scotland) George Miller	22 February 1972	31 August 1975	3 years, 190 days	131	46	31	54	35.11	
(Scotland) Alex Wright	22 October 1970	21 February 1972	1 year, 122 days						
(Scotland) Andy Stevenson^{*}	1 October 1970	22 October 1970	21 days						
(Scotland) George Farm	17 July 1967	1 October 1970	3 years, 76 days	144	70	26	48	48.61	
(Northern Ireland) Willie Cunningham	30 March 1964	22 June 1967	3 years, 84 days	158	86	33	39	54.43	
(Scotland) Jock Stein	14 March 1960	30 March 1964	4 years, 16 days	191	92	37	62	48.17	
(Scotland) Andy Dickson	1 August 1955	13 March 1960	4 years, 225 days	220	86	42	92	39.09	
(Scotland) Bobby Ancell	1 August 1952	31 July 1955	2 years, 364 days	115	51	24	40	44.35	
(Scotland) Tom Younger	1 August 1951	31 May 1952	304 days						
(Scotland) Webber Lees	31 July 1949	1 August 1951	2 years, 1 day	80	39	10	31	48.75	
(Scotland) Sandy Terris	1 August 1948	31 May 1949	303 days	37	19	10	8	48.75	
(Scotland) Bobby Calder	1 August 1947	31 May 1948	304 days	37	14	4	19	37.84	
(Scotland) Willie McAndrew	13 February 1947	31 July 1947	168 days						
(Scotland) Sandy Archibald	12 October 1939	19 November 1946	7 years, 38 days						
(Scotland) Peter Wilson	4 May 1938	31 May 1939	1 year, 27 days	38	20	6	12	52.63	
(Scotland) David Taylor	5 June 1936	10 November 1938	2 years, 158 days	75	22	17	36	29.33	
(Scotland) Willie Knight	31 May 1930	28 May 1936	5 years, 363 days	231	106	38	87	45.89	
(Scotland) Sandy Paterson	31 May 1925	31 May 1930	5 years, 0 days	199	74	33	92	37.19	
(Scotland) Willie Knight	13 March 1922	31 May 1925	3 years, 79 days	120	41	30	49	34.17	
