= John Herron (footballer) =

Scottish footballer (born 1994)

Personal information
- Full name: John Herron
- Date of birth: 1 February 1994 (age 32)
- Place of birth: Bellshill, Scotland
- Position: Midfielder

Team information
- Current team: Linfield FC

Youth career
- 2002–2012: Celtic

Senior career*
Years	Team	Apps	(Gls)
2012–2015	Celtic	2	(0)
2015	→ Cowdenbeath (loan)	5	(0)
2015–2017	Blackpool	15	(0)
2016–2017	→ Dunfermline Athletic (loan)	20	(1)
2017–2018	Raith Rovers	19	(3)
2018–2020	Glentoran	44	(4)
2020–2022	Larne	54	(5)
2023	Dandenong City	6	(4)
2023–	Manchester 62		

International career^{‡}
2009	Scotland U15	2	(0)
2009–2010	Scotland U16	6	(0)
2010–2011	Scotland U17	11	(4)
2012	Scotland U18	2	(0)
2012–2013	Scotland U19	12	(1)
2012	Scotland U20	1	(0)
2012–2014	Scotland U21	12	(3)
- * Club domestic league appearances and goals as of 12:21, 27th March 2024 (UTC) ‡ National team caps and goals as of 30 March 2014

John Herron (born 1 February 1994) is a Scottish professional footballer who plays as a midfielder for Irish Football League side Ballymena United.

== Career ==
=== Celtic ===
Herron joined Celtic as a youth player aged 8. Whilst a member of the club's development squad Herron aged 18 made his first team debut for Celtic on 22 December 2012, coming on as an 83rd-minute substitute in a Scottish Premier League match against Ross County, replacing Georgios Samaras in a 4–0 win. Herron did not feature in a competitive first team game again until over a year later when he made his first starting appearance, in a league match away against Motherwell on 19 April 2014.

==== Cowdenbeath ====
On 23 January 2015, Herron signed for Scottish Championship club Cowdenbeath on loan until the end of the 2014–15 season. He made 5 appearances for the Miners, picking up three yellow cards.

Upon his return to Celtic, he was released from his contract.

=== Blackpool ===
On 24 June 2015, it was reported that Herron had agreed a two-year deal with the option of a further year with League One club, Blackpool. He scored his first goal for Blackpool in a 4–2 EFL Cup win against Bolton Wanderers on 9 August 2016. Following the end of his loan deal with Dunfermline Athletic, Blackpool agreed to terminate Herron's contract, leaving the player free to find a new club.

==== Dunfermline Athletic ====
Herron was loaned to Dunfermline Athletic on 31 August 2016, signing until 31 January 2016. Herron made his debut on 3 September 2016 as a second-half substitute against Brechin City in the Scottish Challenge Cup, with his first full start coming three weeks later in a 4–3 league victory over St Mirren. After some impressive performances for the side, Herron's loan deal was extended on 10 January 2017, with the playing staying at East End Park for the remainder of the 2016–17 season.

=== Raith Rovers ===
After leaving Blackpool, Herron signed for Dunfermline Athletic's Fife rivals Raith Rovers on 31 August 2017, spending one season with the club before being released in May 2018.

=== Northern Ireland, Australia and Gibraltar ===
After leaving Raith, Herron moved to NIFL Premiership side Glentoran on 28 August 2018. After two seasons there he then had two years with Larne. Herron left Larne by mutual agreement in August 2022, following the publication of images showing him wearing a t-shirt that declared support for the IRA.

After moving to Australia in early 2023 for a spell with NPL Victoria 2 side Dandenong City, Herron was linked to a move back to Northern Ireland with Cliftonville, however, the move collapsed and he instead joined ambitious Gibraltar Football League side Manchester 62 on 21 June 2023. Before making his debut, though, on 4 September it was revealed that doctors had advised him to retire due to a persistent knee injury.

== Personal life ==
Herron grew up in Coatbridge and attended St. Andrew's High School.

== Career statistics ==
As of 1 March 2019

Appearances and goals by club, season and competition
Club	Season	League			National cup		League cup		Other		Total	
Club	Season	Division	Apps	Goals	Apps	Goals	Apps	Goals	Apps	Goals	Apps	Goals
Celtic	2012–13	Scottish Premier League	1	0	0	0	0	0	0	0	1	0
Celtic	2013–14	Scottish Premiership	1	0	0	0	0	0	0	0	1	0
Celtic	2014–15	Scottish Premiership	0	0	0	0	0	0	0	0	0	0
Celtic	Total		2	0	0	0	0	0	0	0	2	0
Cowdenbeath (loan)	2014–15	Scottish Championship	5	0	0	0	0	0	0	0	5	0
Blackpool	2015–16	EFL League One	15	0	1	0	0	0	2 (Note: Appearances in the Football League Trophy)	0	18	0
Blackpool	2016–17	EFL League Two	0	0	0	0	2	1	0	0	2	1
Blackpool	Total		15	0	1	0	2	1	2	0	20	1
Dunfermline Athletic (loan)	2016–17	Scottish Championship	20	1	4	0	0	0	2 (Note: Appearances in the Scottish Challenge Cup)	0	26	1
Raith Rovers	2017–18	Scottish League One	19	3	1	0	0	0	3 (Note: Two appearances in the Scottish Challenge Cup; one appearance in the Scottish Championship play-offs)	0	23	3
Glentoran	2018–19	NIFL Premiership	23	4	0	0	1	1	0	0	24	5
Career total			84	8	6	0	3	2	7	0	100	10

== Honours ==
Larne

- County Antrim Shield: (2) 2020-21, 2021-22

Individual

- NIFL Premiership Player of the Month November 2020
