= Jim Gillespie (footballer, born 1947) =

Scottish footballer (1947–2016)

Personal information
- Date of birth: 13 July 1947
- Place of birth: Chapelhall, Scotland
- Date of death: 25 November 2016 (aged 69)
- Place of death: Glenrothes, Scotland
- Position: Winger

Youth career
- Carlisle United

Senior career*
Years	Team	Apps	(Gls)
- Whitburn
1967–1968	East Stirlingshire		
1968–1969	Raith Rovers	31	(2)
1969–1974	Dunfermline Athletic	77	(7)
1974–1975	Alloa Athletic	19	(2)
Total		127	(11)
- * Club domestic league appearances and goals

Jim Gillespie (13 July 1947 – 25 November 2016) was a Scottish professional footballer who played for Carlisle United, Whitburn, East Stirlingshire, Raith Rovers, Dunfermline Athletic and Alloa Athletic, as a winger.
