= Callum Morris =

Footballer (born 1990)

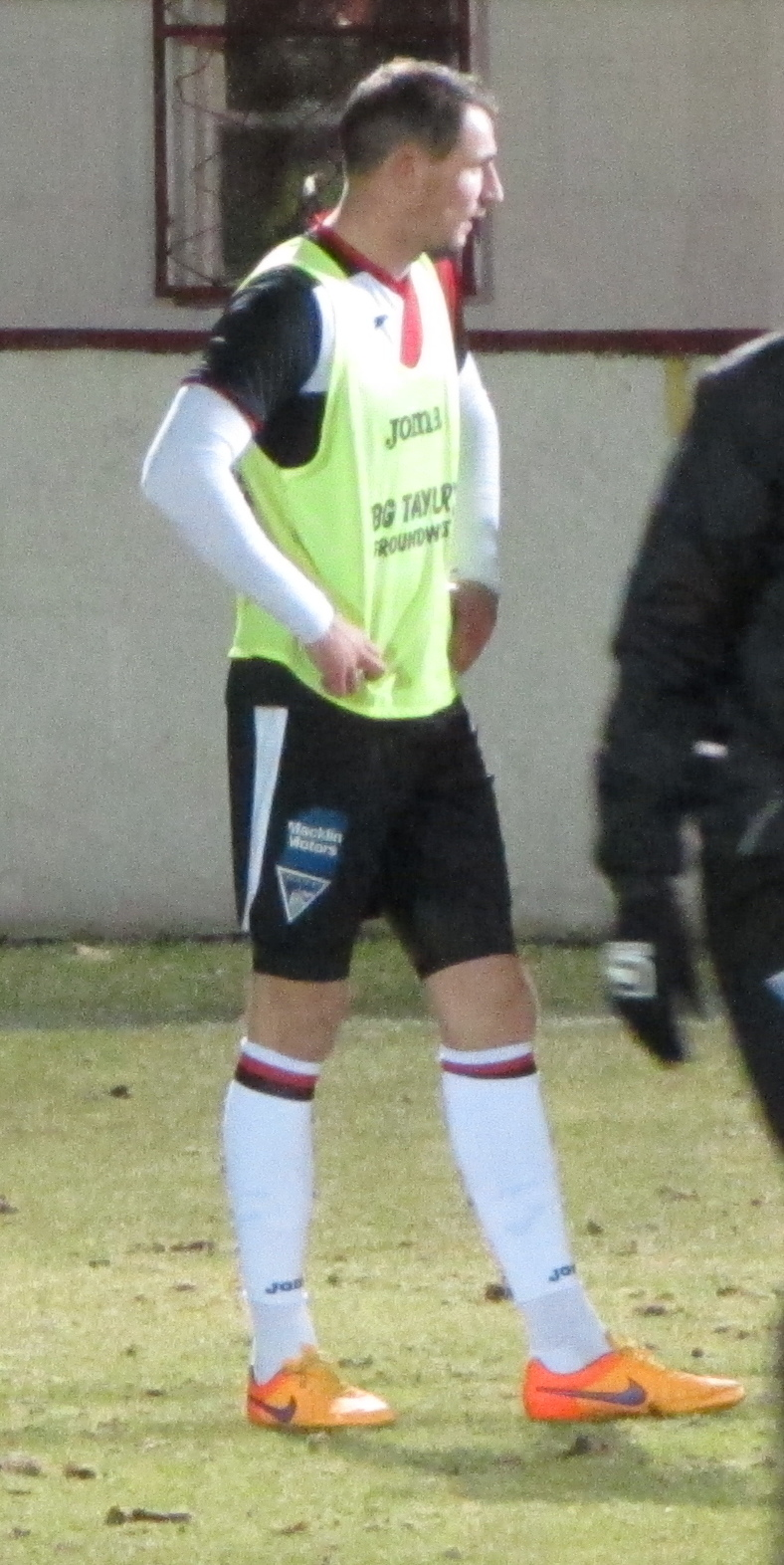
- Morris in 2018 with Dunfermline Athletic

Personal information
- Date of birth: 3 February 1990 (age 36)
- Place of birth: Newcastle upon Tyne, England
- Position: Centre-back

Youth career
- Newcastle United

Senior career*
Years	Team	Apps	(Gls)
2010–2011	Blyth Spartans	5	(0)
2011	Jerez Industrial	0	(0)
2011–2012	Hayes & Yeading United	3	(0)
2012–2014	Dunfermline Athletic	55	(3)
2014–2016	Dundee United	38	(1)
2016	Aberdeen	0	(0)
2016–2018	Dunfermline Athletic	43	(2)
2018–2021	Ross County	41	(0)
2021–2023	Morpeth Town		
Total		186	(6)

International career
- Republic of Ireland U19
- Republic of Ireland U21
- * Club domestic league appearances and goals

Callum Morris (born 3 February 1990) is a former professional footballer who played as a centre-back. Released by Newcastle United as a youngster, Morris played for Blyth Spartans then went to the Glenn Hoddle Academy in Spain, where he also played for Jerez Industrial. Returning to England, he joined Hayes & Yeading United before moving to Scotland in 2012, initially with Dunfermline Athletic before joining Dundee United in 2014. Morris moved to Aberdeen in the summer 2016, but did not play for the club. Morris returned to Dunfermline in December 2016, then moved to Ross County in June 2018. Morris returned to England in 2021 with Morpeth Town.

Born in England, Morris is of Irish descent and received his first call up to the Northern Ireland squad in 2016, having previously played for the Republic of Ireland under-21 team.

== Club career ==
=== Early career ===
Born in Newcastle upon Tyne, England, Morris started his football career at Walker Central before joining Premier League side Newcastle United in 2004. After signing for the Magpies in July 2006, he progressed through the club's youth system. Morris was given a twelve-month extension to his scholarship in 2008.

On 19 July 2008, Morris made his first team appearance for Newcastle United in a friendly match against Hartlepool United, where he came on as a 72nd-minute substitute, in a 4–1 win. After the match, Morris and teammate Darren Lough were described by coach Adam Sadler as "the next big thing", Despite being called up to the first team, however, he was never made a single first team appearance for the next two years. At the end of the 2009–10 season, Morris was released by the club.

Following his release from Newcastle, Morris had an unsuccessful trial with Gateshead, before joining Blyth Spartans on 13 August 2010. After making five appearances for Blyth, Morris left the club to join the Glenn Hoddle Academy in Spain.

While at the Glenn Hoddle Academy, Morris also played for Spanish Fourth Division side Jerez Industrial CF, where he gained full-time, senior football experience. After leaving Jerez Industrial CF, he said about his football career: " I had just finished a spell at the Glenn Hoddle academy and found myself fed up of trials and trekking all over globe trying to find a way back into full time football. I decided to find a team where I could enjoy just playing football again. I wasn’t getting anything out of it and my love for the game began to diminish as all the sacrifices just weren’t worth it." In November 2011, Morris joined Hayes & Yeading United, making three appearances for the club before being released in January 2012.

=== Dunfermline Athletic ===
Following unsuccessful trials in England, Portugal and Greece, Morris had considered giving up professional football before he went on trial at Dunfermline Athletic. He played as a trialist and started the whole game, in a 3–0 win against Montrose in the second round of the Scottish League Cup on 29 August 2012. Two days later on 31 August 2012, Morris signed for Dunfermline Athletic in the Scottish First Division .

The next day on 1 September 2012, Morris made his league debut for the club, starting the whole game, and gave away a penalty for handball, which was saved by Paul Gallacher, a 3–1 win against Raith Rovers. This was followed up by keeping a clean sheet in the next three league matches against Dumbarton, Livingston and Hamilton Academical. Since joining Dunfermline Athletic, he went on to be a first team regular, playing in the centre–back position. On 8 December 2012, he received a straight red card after a foul on Stefan Scougall in the 19th minute, in a 2–1 loss against Livingston. After serving a two match suspension, Morris scored his first goal on his return, in a 4–2 loss against Greenock Morton on 29 December 2012. After missing one match due to illness, he returned to the starting line–up, in a 2–1 win against Hamilton Academical on 2 February 2013. On 23 February 2013, Morris scored his second goal for the club, in a 4–1 loss against Greenock Morton. By late–March, he suffered an injury that saw him out for three matches. On 6 April 2013, Morris made his return from injury, where he set up one of the goals, in a 3–2 loss against Hamilton Academical. But Morris’ return was short–lived when he missed one match. On 20 April 2013, Morris made his return to the starting line–up and helped Dunfermline Athletic, in a 1–0 win against Cowdenbeath. The season was marked with financial problems, which led to the club entering administration. Upon learning Dunfermline Athletic's administration, he wrote on Twitter of his frustrations over wage delays. The club were relegated following a defeat in the play-offs, where Morris was absent for all four matches due to a hamstring injury. At the end of the 2012–13 season, he made thirty appearances and scoring two times in all competitions. Despite the relegation, Morris was named in the PFA Scotland Team of the Year for the First Division. He was also named the club's player of the season.

Ahead of the 2013–14 season, Morris rejected rumours that he had left Dunfermline Athletic by appearing in the opening friendly against Hearts. On 27 July 2013, Morris scored his first goal of the season, in a 3–1 win against Cowdenbeath in the first round of the Scottish Challenge Cup. After missing the opening game of the season, he returned to the starting line–up and scored the club's first goal in Scottish League One, in a 3–2 loss against Arbroath. On 27 August 2013, Morris was a fault when he scored an own-goal, in a 2–1 loss against Falkirk in the second round of the Scottish League Cup. Morris continued to be a regular in the first team, playing in the centre–back position. On 16 November 2013, he played a role in a match against Airdrieonians, setting up two goals, in a 3–0 win. However, Morris suffered an Achilles tendon injury that kept him out for a month. But on 18 January 2014, he made his return to the starting line–up against Airdrieonians and played 72 minutes before being substituted, due to a hamstring injury, as Dunfermline Athletic loss 1–0. After missing two matches, Morris made his return to the starting line–up, in a 4–0 loss against Rangers in the last-16 of the Scottish Cup on 7 February 2014. He later regained his first team place, playing in the centre–back position towards the end of the 2013–14 season. Morris helped the club to finish second place in Scottish League One, qualifying for the Scottish Championship play-offs and then winning against Stranraer on aggregate. Unfortunately, he was unable to help Dunfermline Athletic promoted to the Scottish Championship and remained in League One after losing 4–1 on aggregate to Cowdenbeath in the play-off final, in what turns out to be his final appearance for the club. For his performance, Morris was named PFA Scotland Scottish League One Team of the Year. At the end of the 2013–14 season, he made thirty–seven appearances and scoring two times in all competitions.

With his contract expiring at the end of the 2013–14 season, Morris was offered a new contract with the club. On 12 March 2014, he rejected a new contract offered, much to a disappointment of manager Jim Jefferies. Upon learning that Morris rejected a new contract, Dundee United took interest in signing him.

=== Dundee United ===
Morris signed a two-year contract with Scottish Premiership side Dundee United on 17 June 2014.

He made his debut for the club, starting the whole game, in a 3–0 win against Aberdeen in the opening game of the season. After the match, manager Jackie McNamara praised his performance, describing it as “solid”. Since joining Dundee United, Morris became a first team regular, playing in the centre–back position alongside Jarosław Fojut. His first goal for the club came on 21 September 2014, as Dundee United won 4–1 against city rivals Dundee in the Dundee derby. After missing one match due to suspension, he made his return, coming on as a second-half substitute, in a 2–0 loss against Aberdeen on 13 December 2014. However, in a match against St Johnstone on 27 December 2014, Morris suffered an Achilles injury and suffered in the 8th minute, in a 2–1 loss. Morris’ injury soon kept him out for several weeks. On 24 January 2015, he made his return to the first team from injury, starting the whole game, in a 3–1 win over Motherwell. In a follow–up match against Aberdeen in the semi-final of the Scottish League Cup, Morris scored his second goal of the season, in a 2–1 win to send the club through to the final. However, in a match against Kilmarnock on 14 February 2015, he suffered a knee injury and was substituted at half–time, in a 3–2 loss. After the match, Morris was out for four matches. On 15 March 2015, he recovered in time to start in the League Cup Final against Celtic, as Dundee United lost 2–0. However, his return was short–lived when Morris sustained a hamstring injury which kept him out for three weeks, On 11 April 2015, he made his return from injury, starting the whole game, in a 1–0 win against Hamilton Academical. Following his return from injury, Morris regained his first team place, where he started for the next six matches. However, Morris suffered another injury, ruling him out for the rest of the season. Despite his injuries, Morris made 30 appearances and scored twice in all competitions.

Ahead of the 2015–16 season, Morris suffered a thigh injury and was out for two months. On 12 September 2015, he made his return from injury, starting the whole game, in a 2–1 loss against Kilmarnock. On 22 September 2015, Morris scored his first goal of the season, in a 3–1 win against Dunfermline Athletic in the last 16 of the Scottish League Cup. However, his return was short–lived when he suffered a knee injury and was substituted in the 7th minute, in a 3–0 loss against Partick Thistle on 3 October 2015. After the match, Morris was out for two months with the injury. On 12 December 2015, he made his return from injury, starting the whole game, in a 1–0 loss against Partick Thistle. However, his return was short–lived when Morris suffered a medial knee ligament injury and was substituted at half–time, in a 3–2 loss against Hearts on 30 December 2015. After the match, he was out for three months. On 11 March 2016, Morris made his return from injury, starting the whole game, in a 2–1 loss against Motherwell. However, Dundee United's poor form have led to finding themselves in a relegation zone and even after returning from injury, the club's poor form continued. Eventually, Dundee United were relegated to the Scottish Championship after losing 2–1 to city rivals Dundee on 2 May 2016. On 6 May 2016, he made his return to the starting line–up, only for him to be sent–off for a second bookable offence, in a 3–2 win against Inverness Caledonian Thistle. At the end of the 2015–16 season, Morris made fifteen appearances and scoring once in all competitions.

Shortly after Dundee United's relegation, he was released by the club upon expiry of his contract.

=== Aberdeen ===
On 15 June 2016, Morris signed a one-year contract with Scottish Premiership side Aberdeen.

However, he was unable to establish himself in the first team and failed to dispatch a place from Shay Logan, as well as, his facing own injury concern. As a result, Morris made no appearances for the side, and was released on 30 December 2016.

=== Dunfermline Athletic (second spell) ===
After leaving Aberdeen, Morris re-signed for Dunfermline Athletic on 31 December 2016 on a deal until the end of the 2016–17 season.

On 21 January 2017, he made his second debut for the club, starting the whole game, in a 3–2 win against Alloa Athletic in the fourth round of the Scottish Cup. Since joining Dunfermline Athletic, Morris quickly became a first team regular, playing in the centre–back position. In the return leg of the Scottish Cup last 16 against Hamilton Academical, he scored his first goal for Dunfermline Athletic in his second spell, in a loss following a defeat in a penalty shootout. In a match against Falkirk on 22 April 2017, Morris suffered an injury and was substituted in the 55th minute, in a 2–1 loss. As a result, he missed the remainder of the 2016–17 season. At the end of the 2016–17 season, Morris made sixteen appearances and scoring once in all competitions. After helping the club finish fifth in the Scottish Championship, he signed a one-year contract extension keeping him at the club until May 2018. Morris stated his intention to sign a contract extension with Dunfermline Athletic.

Prior to the start of the 2017–18 season, Morris was named Dunfermline Athletic's captain following the departures of Andy Geggan and Callum Fordyce. He helped the club win all four matches in the Scottish League Cup group stage. After missing the opening game of the 2017–18 season, Morris made his return to the starting line–up as captain, in a 5–0 loss against Rangers in the last 16 of the Scottish League Cup. He continued to establish himself in the first team, playing in the centre–back position. On 16 September 2017, Morris scored his first goal of the season, in a 3–0 win against St Mirren. On 25 November 2017, he scored his second goal of the season, in a 2–2 draw against Dumbarton. After missing one match due to accumulating five yellow cards, Morris made his return to the starting line–up as captain, in a 0–0 draw against Dundee United on 13 January 2018. The next two matches saw Dunfermline Athletic lose and he was dropped to the substitute bench. After not playing for a month due to being on the substitute bench, Morris made his return to the first team, coming on as a 74th-minute substitute, in a 2–0 loss against St Mirren on 10 March 2018. He followed up by helping the club kept a clean sheet in the next three matches against Inverness Caledonian Thistle, Greenock Morton and Brechin City. After missing one match due to a knock, Morris made his return, coming on as a late substitute, in a 2–2 draw against Inverness Caledonian Thistle on 21 April 2018. He captained in Dunfermline Athletic's play–offs match against Dundee United, as the club loss 2–1 on aggregate. At the end of the 2017–18 season, Morris made forty appearances and scoring two times in all competitions.

On 2 June 2018, Morris announced that he's leaving the Pars at the end of his contract and intend to return to England.

=== Ross County ===
On 21 June 2018, Morris opted to play in Scotland once again by signing for Ross County during the 2018 close season.

He made his debut for the club, starting the whole game, in a 2–0 win against Elgin City in the group stage of the Scottish League Cup. On 28 July 2018, Morris scored his first goal for Ross County, in a 2–0 win against Alloa Athletic in the group stage of the Scottish League Cup. On 14 August 2018, he captained the club for the first time, in a 2–1 win against Heart of Midlothian U20 in the first round of the Scottish Challenge Cup. Morris then helped Ross County kept three clean sheets on 1 September 2018, 8 September 2018, 15 September 2018 and 18 September 2018 against Falkirk, Raith Rovers, Queen of the South and Inverness Caledonian Thistle respectively. Since joining the club, he became a first team regular, playing in the centre–back position alongside Ross Draper and Liam Fontaine. However, in a match against Ayr United on 20 October 2018, Morris suffered a hamstring injury and was substituted in the 51st minute, in a 2–1 win. As a result, he was out for a month with an injury. On 24 November 2018, Morris made his return to the starting line–up against Dunfermline Athletic, only for him to suffer a knee injury and substituted in the 38th minute, as Ross County won 2–1. After the match, Morris was out for a month. But he made his return to the starting line–up against local rivals, Inverness Caledonian Thistle on 29 December 2018. In a follow–up match against Greenock Morton, however, Morris suffered a knee injury and was substituted in the 63rd minute, as the club loss 1–0. As a result, he was eventually out for the rest of the 2018–19 season. While being sidelined for the rest of the 2018–19 season, Morris’ contributions saw Ross County won both the Scottish Championship and the Scottish Challenge Cup. At the end of the end of the 2018–19 season, he made nineteen appearances and scoring once in all competitions.

Ahead of the 2019–20 season, Morris recovered from his injury and returned to full training. He made his first appearance of the season, starting the whole game, in a 4–0 win against Brechin City in the group stage of the Scottish League Cup. Morris helped Ross County kept three clean sheets on 24 July 2019, 3 August 2019 and 10 August 2019 against Forfar Athletic, Hamilton Academical and Hearts respectively. However, he suffered a groin injury while on international duty and was out for two months. On 19 November 2019, Morris made his return from injury, starting the whole game, in a 3–1 loss against Aberdeen. Since returning from injury, he started in the next seven matches for the club. Following a 1–1 draw against St Johnstone on 29 December 2019, which saw Morris substituted in the 69th minute, he was dropped from the squad and did not play for two months. On 5 February 2020, he made his return to the first team, starting the whole game, in a 2–0 win against Livingston. After being dropped from the squad for one match, Morris made his return to the first team, starting the whole game, in a 1–1 draw against St Johnstone on 15 February 2020. The season was curtailed because of the COVID-19 pandemic. At the end of the 2019–20 season, he made nineteen appearances in all competitions. Following this, Morris signed a one–year contract extension with Ross County.

Ahead of the 2020–21 season, Morris was appointed as the new vice-captain of Ross County, with Iain Vigurs appointed as a new captain. However, he found himself out of the starting eleven, due to an achilles problem and was placed on the substitute bench, due to Coll Donaldson and Alex Iacovitti being preferred as the club's first choice centre–backs. Morris made his first appearance of the 2020–21 season, starting the whole game as captain, in a 2–0 loss against Rangers on 4 October 2020. However, his return was short–lived when he suffered a calf injury and was out for a month. On 14 November 2020, Morris made his return from injury, coming on as a 74th-minute substitute, in a 3–0 win against Stirling Albion in the group stage of the Scottish League Cup. In a match against Rangers on 6 December 2020, however, he was a fault for scoring an own-goal, in a 4–0 loss. However, Morris suffered a hamstring injury that saw him out for three matches. On 16 January 2021, he returned from injury, starting the whole game, in a 4–1 win against Aberdeen. In a match against Celtic on 21 February 2021, however, Morris suffered an Achilles injury and was substituted in the 42nd minute, in a 1–0 win. After the match, he was out for the rest of the 2020–21 season. At the end of the 2020–21 season, Morris made seventeen appearances in all competitions.

On 27 May 2021, Morris was released from Ross County along with nine other players.

=== Morpeth Town ===
On 19 July 2021 Morris signed for Northern Premier League side Morpeth Town. He later explained it was a right time for him to play football part-time with a coaching role.

On 21 August 2021, Morris made his debut for the club, starting the whole game, in a 2–0 loss against Stalybridge Celtic. Since joining Morpeth Town, he became the club's first choice centre–back in his first season. On 29 January 2022, Morris scored his first goals for Morpeth Town, in a 2–1 win against Basford United.

In the 2022–23 season, however, Morris suffered an injury that saw miss the start of the season. He did return from injury, appearing as an unused substitute in a number of matches. On 5 October 2022, Morris made his first appearance of the season, coming on as a 68th-minute substitute, in a 1–1 draw against Bamber Bridge. In a match against Warrington Rylands on 19 November 2022, however, he suffered an injury and was substituted in the 24th minute, as Morpeth Town loss 2–0. Despite this, Morris continued to remain in the first team as the club's first-choice centre–backs.

After two seasons with Morpeth Towns, Morris announced on his social media accounts that he was retiring from football.

== International career ==
Although born in England, Morris has Irish ancestry through both his parents, his mother's family originating from Waterford and his father's from Belfast. In August 2008, he was called up to the Republic of Ireland under-19 squad for the first time. Morris made his under-19 debut, starting the whole game, in a 1–0 loss against Portugal under-19 on 18 August 2008. In June 2009, he was called up to the Republic of Ireland under-19 squad once again. On 7 June 2009, Morris captained the under-19 side for the first time, in a 6–1 loss against Switerzland. He later made five appearances for Republic of Ireland under-19 side.

In August 2009, Morris was called up to the under-21 for the first time. However, he appeared as an unused substitute in a 1–1 draw against Estonia U21 on 9 September 2009. But on 9 October 2009, Morris was finally to make his debut for Republic of Ireland U21, in a 1–1 draw against Georgia U21. He later made five appearances for Republic of Ireland under-21 side.

On 31 August 2016, Morris was called up for the first time to the Northern Ireland squad for the World Cup qualifying game against the Czech Republic, as his father was born in Belfast. He continued to be called up to the senior team on four more occasions but never made an appearance for Northern Ireland.

== Career statistics ==
As of 21 February 2021

Appearances and goals by club, season and competition
Club	Season	League			National cup		League cup		Other		Total	
Club	Season	Division	Apps	Goals	Apps	Goals	Apps	Goals	Apps	Goals	Apps	Goals
Blyth Spartans	2010–11	Conference North	5	0	0	0	0	0	0	0	5	0
Jerez Industrial	2010–11	Tercera División	0	0	0	0	0	0	0	0	0	0
Hayes & Yeading United	2011–12	Football Conference	3	0	0	0	0	0	0	0	3	0
Dunfermline Athletic	2012–13	Scottish Division One	26	2	2	0	2	0	0	0	30	2
Dunfermline Athletic	2013–14	Scottish League One	28	1	4	0	2	0	3	1	37	2
Dunfermline Athletic	Total		54	3	6	0	4	0	3	1	67	4
Dundee United	2014–15	Scottish Premiership	25	1	2	0	3	1	–		30	2
Dundee United	2015–16	Scottish Premiership	13	0	1	0	1	1	–		15	1
Dundee United	Total		38	1	3	0	4	1	–		45	3
Aberdeen	2016–17	Scottish Premiership	0	0	0	0	0	0	–		0	0
Dunfermline Athletic	2016–17	Scottish Championship	13	0	3	1	0	0	0	0	16	1
Dunfermline Athletic	2017–18	Scottish Championship	30	2	2	0	5	0	3	0	40	2
Dunfermline Athletic	Total		43	2	5	1	5	0	3	0	56	3
Ross County	2018–19	Scottish Championship	12	0	0	0	5	1	2	0	19	1
Ross County	2019–20	Scottish Premiership	17	0	0	0	2	0	–		19	0
Ross County	2020–21	Scottish Premiership	12	0	0	0	5	0	—		17	0
Ross County	Total		41	0	0	0	12	1	2	0	55	1
Career total			184	6	14	1	25	3	8	1	231	11

== Honours ==
Ross County

- Scottish Championship: 2018–19
- Scottish Challenge Cup: 2018–19

Individual

- PFA Scotland Team of the Year: 2012–13 Scottish First Division
- PFA Scotland League One Team of the Year: 2013–14
