= David Syme (footballer) =

Scottish footballer

Personal information
- Date of birth: 23 June 1997 (age 29)
- Place of birth: Kilbirnie, Scotland
- Position: Centre-back

Team information
- Current team: Clydebank
- Number: 22

Senior career*
Years	Team	Apps	(Gls)
2013–2016	Kilmarnock	27	(1)
2016–2017	Partick Thistle	3	(0)
2017	Raith Rovers	0	(0)
2017	→ Cowdenbeath (loan)	15	(1)
2017–2018	Cowdenbeath	23	(6)
2018	Troon	27	(8)
2018–2022	Kilwinning Rangers	117	(25)
2022–2024	Darvel	8	(1)
2023	→ Troon (loan)	4	(1)
2024–	Clydebank	0	(0)
- * Club domestic league appearances and goals as of 13:47, 31 January 2025 (UTC)

David Syme (born 23 June 1997) is a Scottish footballer who plays as a centre-back for Clydebank.

== Career ==
Syme made his Kilmarnock debut on 4 April 2015, in s 2–1 defeat to Motherwell, scoring the Rugby Park's club's only goal of the game.

On 16 June 2016, Syme signed a one-year-contract with Firhill side Partick Thistle. The defender left Kilmarnock after three years he broke through the youth development team and into the first team and left after 11 games and just only one goal to his name, his manager Lee Clark described him as a highly rated young defender with bags of ability and wished him well on his move to Partick Thistle.

On 21 January 2017, Syme was released by Thistle after only featuring twice for the club in cup fixtures and predominantly spending his time with the under 20s squad. On 31 January 2017 he signed for Scottish Championship side Raith Rovers until the end of the 2016–17 season. On 14 March 2017, it was announced that Syme had joined Cowdenbeath on loan. Syme was released by Rovers at the end of the season, and subsequently signed for Cowdenbeath on 9 June 2017. In Syme's first game for the club he bagged a double in a Betfred cup fixture and also went onto score in his league debut for the side.

He moved on to join West Region side Troon in March 2018 under Jimmy Kirkwood & his former Kilmarnock Coach Matt Maley, where he won promotion to the Premier Division. After a successful period, he suddenly joined Premier Division rivals Kilwinning Rangers for an undisclosed fee, where he spent four seasons at Buffs Park, much of that period as Captain. He became the subject of a record transfer between WOSFL clubs in March 2022 when he signed for Darvel for a reported £12,000.

On 23 February 2023, Syme returned to Troon on loan until the end of the 2022–23 season.

In July 2024, Syme signed with fellow West of Scotland Premier Division side Clydebank on a three–year deal.

== Career statistics ==
As of match played 28 October 2017

Appearances and goals by club, season and competition
Club	Season	League			Scottish Cup		League Cup		Other		Total	
Club	Season	Division	Apps	Goals	Apps	Goals	Apps	Goals	Apps	Goals	Apps	Goals
Kilmarnock	2014–15	Premiership	5	0	0	0	0	0	0	0	5	0
Kilmarnock	2015–16	Premiership	5	0	1	0	0	0	0	0	6	0
Kilmarnock	Kilmarnock total		10	0	1	0	0	0	0	0	11	0
Partick Thistle	2016–17	Premiership	0	0	0	0	2	0	—		2	0
Partick Thistle U-20s	2016–17	SPFL Development League	—		—		—		2 (Note: Appearances in the Scottish Challenge Cup)	0	2	0
Cowdenbeath (loan)	2016–17	League Two	10	1	0	0	—		2 (Note: Appearances in the League Two play-offs)	0	12	1
Cowdenbeath	2017–18	League Two	10	1	1	0	4	2	0	0	15	3
Cowdenbeath	Cowdenbeath total		20	2	1	0	4	2	2	0	27	4
Career total			30	2	2	0	6	2	4	0	42	4

== Honours ==
Kilwinning Rangers

- Eglinton Cup: Winner 2021–22
- West of Scotland Football League Cup: Runner-up 2021-22

Darvel

- West of Scotland Football League Premier Division: Winner 2021–22
- Scottish Junior Cup: Winner 2023–2024
- West of Scotland Cup: Winner 2023–2024
