= List of Scottish football transfers winter 2011–12 =

This is a list of Scottish football transfers featuring at least one 2011–12 Scottish Premier League club or one 2011–12 Scottish First Division club which were completed after the end of the summer 2011 transfer window and before the end of the 2011–12 season.

== September 2011 – May 2012 ==
Date	Name	Moving from	Moving to	Fee
1 September 2011	Edwin de Graaf	Hibernian	Excelsior	Free
5 September 2011	Kyle Lochead	Partick Thistle	Kirkintilloch Rob Roy	Free
5 September 2011	Dani Sánchez	Inverness Caledonian Thistle	Wellington Phoenix	Free
6 September 2011	Morten Rasmussen	Celtic	Sivasspor	Loan
7 September 2011	Ross Carnegie	Dundee	Broughty Athletic	Free
9 September 2011	Kyle Hutton	Rangers	Partick Thistle	Loan
9 September 2011	Craig McLeish	Falkirk	Stirling Albion	Free
9 September 2011	Wayne Drummond	Rangers	Ballymena United	Free
12 September 2011	Omar Daley	Bradford City	Motherwell	Free
12 September 2011	Cristiano Kisuka	Rangers	Beith Juniors	Free
12 September 2011	Islam Feruz	Celtic	Chelsea	Free
13 September 2011	David MacGregor	Greenock Morton	Stranraer	Free
14 September 2011	Rory Fallon	Yeovil Town	Aberdeen	Free
15 September 2011	Jordon Brown	Aberdeen	Forfar Athletic	Loan
16 September 2011	Kieran Burns	Partick Thistle	Clydebank	Loan
19 September 2011	Bobby Donnelly	Ayr United	Kirkintilloch Rob Roy	Free
20 September 2011	Kyle Allison	Dunfermline Athletic	Linlithgow Rose	Free
21 September 2011	Connor Fairley	Heart of Midlothian	Airdrie United	Free
22 September 2011	Scott Taggart	Hibernian	Stranraer	Loan
23 September 2011	Mark Howard	Aberdeen	Blackpool	Free
24 September 2011	Matthew McGinley	Rutherglen Glencairn	Greenock Morton	Free
24 September 2011	Colin Hamilton	Heart of Midlothian	Stenhousemuir	Loan
28 September 2011	Calum Burns	Hibernian	Musselburgh Athletic	Free
29 September 2011	Mark Carrington	Hamilton Academical	Bury	Free
1 October 2011	Stephen Stirling	Rangers	Stranraer	Free
1 October 2011	Martin Grehan	Partick Thistle	Stranraer	Free
6 October 2011	Andreas Hinkel	Celtic	Freiburg	Free
13 October 2011	Maurice Ross	Motherwell	Livingston	Free
13 October 2011	Mark Fotheringham	Anorthosis Famagusta	Livingston	Free
13 October 2011	Bryan Hodge	Partick Thistle	Brechin City	Free
14 October 2011	Kevin McBride	Hibernian	Hamilton Academical	Free
14 October 2011	Gavin Rae	Cardiff City	Dundee	Free
14 October 2011	Bradley Coyne	St Mirren	East Stirlingshire	Loan
18 October 2011	Steven Lawless	Motherwell	Albion Rovers	Loan
20 October 2011	Francis Jeffers	Motherwell	Newcastle United Jets	Free
21 October 2011	Ross Gray	Livingston	Berwick Rangers	Loan
27 October 2011	Jamie Mole	Heart of Midlothian	Blyth Spartans	Free
29 October 2011	Derek Young	Grindavík	Greenock Morton	Free
3 November 2011	Denis Prychynenko	Heart of Midlothian	Raith Rovers	Loan
4 November 2011	Calum Elliot	Heart of Midlothian	Dundee	Loan
4 November 2011	Dominic Cervi	Celtic	Greenock Morton	Loan
4 November 2011	Nick Hegarty	St Mirren	Mansfield Town	Free
8 November 2011	Lewis Horner	Hibernian	East Stirlingshire	Loan
9 November 2011	Willie McLaren	Hamilton Academical	Airdrie United	Loan
15 November 2011	Robbie Neilson	Leicester City	Dundee United	Free
16 November 2011	Stephen Hughes	Norwich City	Motherwell	Free
17 November 2011	Craig Dargo	St Mirren	Partick Thistle	Free
17 November 2011	Thomas Reilly	St Mirren	Albion Rovers	Loan
18 November 2011	Alex Cooper	Liverpool	Ross County	Free
19 November 2011	Andre Blackman	AFC Wimbledon	Celtic	Free
21 November 2011	David Smith	Heart of Midlothian	Raith Rovers	Loan
21 November 2011	Jamie Walker	Heart of Midlothian	Raith Rovers	Loan
21 November 2011	Jason Holt	Heart of Midlothian	Raith Rovers	Loan
23 November 2011	Richie Ryan	Sligo Rovers	Dundee United	Free
24 November 2011	Sone Aluko	Aberdeen	Rangers	Free
24 November 2011	Liam Caddis	St Johnstone	Arbroath	Loan
24 November 2011	James Beattie	Rangers	Sheffield United	Free
29 November 2011	Jamie Langfield	Aberdeen	Forfar Athletic	Loan
30 November 2011	Tam McManus	Falkirk	Ayr United	Free
1 December 2011	Jos Hooiveld	Celtic	Southampton	Undisclosed
1 December 2011	Ludovic Roy	Cowdenbeath	Raith Rovers	Free
7 December 2011	Gordon Smith	Heart of Midlothian	Hamilton Academical	Loan
7 December 2011	Kevin McHattie	Heart of Midlothian	Alloa Athletic	Loan
7 December 2011	Stevie May	St Johnstone	Alloa Athletic	Loan
16 December 2011	Ally Graham	Falkirk	Dumbarton	Loan
17 December 2011	David Crawford	Ayr United	Clyde	Free
19 December 2011	Rubén Palazuelos	Heart of Midlothian	Deportivo Alavés	Free
22 December 2011	Eoin Doyle	Sligo Rovers	Hibernian	Free
1 January 2012	Scott Davidson	Falkirk	Stirling Albion	Free
1 January 2012	Pat Clarke	Dunfermline Athletic	Raith Rovers	Loan
1 January 2012	Dale Hilson	Dundee United	Forfar Athletic	Loan
1 January 2012	Marc McCallum	Dundee United	Forfar Athletic	Loan
1 January 2012	Mikael Lustig	Rosenborg	Celtic	Free
1 January 2012	Mark Lamont	St Mirren	Dumbarton	Loan
1 January 2012	Blair Currie	Rangers	Hamilton Academical	Loan
1 January 2012	Ben Hutchinson	Kilmarnock	Mansfield Town	Free
1 January 2012	Willie McLaren	Hamilton Academical	Airdrie United	Free
1 January 2012	Eggert Jónsson	Heart of Midlothian	Wolverhampton Wanderers	Undisclosed
1 January 2012	Marco Paixão (Note: Paixão, Casalinuovo, Gibson and Elebert left Hamilton in the Summer of 2011.)	Hamilton Academical	Naft Tehran	Free
2 January 2012	Darren Cole	Rangers	Partick Thistle	Loan
2 January 2012	Jamie Campbell	Partick Thistle	Stenhousemuir	Loan
2 January 2012	Billy Berntsson	Kilmarnock	Hammarby IF	Free
2 January 2012	Darren McCormack (Note: McCormack left Ross County in September 2011.)	Ross County	East Fife	Free
3 January 2012	Thomas Kind Bendiksen	Rangers	Tromsø IL	Free
4 January 2012	Henrik Ojamaa	RoPS	Motherwell	Free
4 January 2012	Sam McMahon	Rangers	Doncaster Rovers	Free
4 January 2012	James Chambers	Hamilton Academical	St Patrick's Athletic	Free
5 January 2012	Kal Naismith	Rangers	Partick Thistle	Loan
6 January 2012	Richard Foster	Aberdeen	Bristol City	Undisclosed
6 January 2012	Mark Reynolds	Sheffield Wednesday	Aberdeen	Loan
6 January 2012	David Crawford	Hibernian	Brechin City	Free
6 January 2012	Damián Casalinuovo	Hamilton Academical	Raith Rovers	Free
7 January 2012	Mark Ferry (Note: Ferry left Raith Rovers in the Summer of 2011.)	Raith Rovers	Stirling Albion	Free
9 January 2012	Scott Allan	Dundee United	West Bromwich Albion	Undisclosed
10 January 2012	Jon McShane	St Mirren	Hamilton Academical	Loan
10 January 2012	Mark Durnan	St Johnstone	Elgin City	Loan
11 January 2012	Iain Turner	Preston North End	Dunfermline Athletic	Loan
11 January 2012	Ben Gordon	Chelsea	Kilmarnock	Loan
11 January 2012	Dean Shiels	Doncaster Rovers	Kilmarnock	Free
12 January 2012	George Francomb	Norwich City	Hibernian	Loan
12 January 2012	Steve Williams	Bradford City	Inverness Caledonian Thistle	Loan
12 January 2012	Jordan White	Clyde	Falkirk	Free
12 January 2012	Derek Lyle	Hamilton Academical	Cowdenbeath	Free
12 January 2012	Caolan McAleer	Linfield	Partick Thistle	Free
13 January 2012	Daniel Redmond	Wigan Athletic	Hamilton Academical	Loan
13 January 2012	Graham Gartland	St Johnstone	Shamrock Rovers	Free
13 January 2012	Ryan Finnie	Hamilton Academical	Dumbarton	Loan
13 January 2012	Dale Fulton	Falkirk	Clyde	Loan
13 January 2012	Garry Wood	Ross County	Montrose	Free
13 January 2012	Adam Dodd	Blackpool	Ayr United	Loan
14 January 2012	Michael Nelson	Scunthorpe United	Kilmarnock	Free
16 January 2012	John Fleck	Rangers	Blackpool	Loan
17 January 2012	Russell Anderson	Derby County	Aberdeen	Free
17 January 2012	Josh Thompson	Celtic	Chesterfield	Loan
17 January 2012	Bradley Coyne	St Mirren	Forfar Athletic	Free
18 January 2012	Jack Compton	Falkirk	St Johnstone	Loan
18 January 2012	Jack Grimmer	Aberdeen	Fulham	£200,000
19 January 2012	Lee Croft	Derby County	St Johnstone	Loan
19 January 2012	Calum Elliot	Heart of Midlothian	Žalgiris Vilnius	Free
19 January 2012	Paul Currie	Hamilton Academical	Musselburgh Athletic	Free
20 January 2012	Gary Smith	Motherwell	Stenhousemuir	Loan
20 January 2012	Jordan Halsman	Motherwell	Albion Rovers	Loan
20 January 2012	Mervan Celik	GAIS	Rangers	Free
20 January 2012	Dougie Imrie	Hamilton Academical	St Mirren	£35,000
20 January 2012	Liam Tomsett	Blackpool	Ayr United	Loan
20 January 2012	Mark Kerr	Asteras Tripolis	Dunfermline Athletic	Free
21 January 2012	Graham Webster	Dundee	Peterhead	Loan
23 January 2012	Rabiu Ibrahim	PSV Eindhoven	Celtic	Free
23 January 2012	James McPake	Coventry City	Hibernian	Loan
23 January 2012	Tom Soares	Stoke City	Hibernian	Loan
24 January 2012	Sam Parkin	St Johnstone	Queen of the South	Free
25 January 2012	Ross McKinnon	Motherwell	Alloa Athletic	Loan
25 January 2012	Dieter Van Tornhout	Nea Salamis Famagusta	Kilmarnock	Free
26 January 2012	Sam Winnall	Wolverhampton Wanderers	Inverness Caledonian Thistle	Loan
26 January 2012	Grant Adam	Rangers	Airdrie United	Loan
27 January 2012	Stephen Hughes	Motherwell	Aberdeen	Free
27 January 2012	Claude Gnakpa	Walsall	Inverness Caledonian Thistle	Free
27 January 2012	Rory McKenzie	Kilmarnock	Brechin City	Loan
27 January 2012	Mark Stewart	Bradford City	Hamilton Academical	Loan
27 January 2012	Jon Routledge	Stockport County	Hamilton Academical	Loan
28 January 2012	David McNamee (Note: McNamee left Aberdeen in the Summer of 2011.)	Aberdeen	Ross County	Free
29 January 2012	Gary Fisher	Kilmarnock	Cowdenbeath	Loan
30 January 2012	Gavin Rae	Dundee	Aberdeen	Free
30 January 2012	Miloš Lačný	Sparta Prague	Dundee United	Loan
30 January 2012	Ryan Stevenson	Heart of Midlothian	Ipswich Town	Undisclosed
30 January 2012	James Keatings	Celtic	St Johnstone	Loan
30 January 2012	Paweł Brożek	Trabzonspor	Celtic	Loan
30 January 2012	Kudus Oyenuga	Tottenham Hotspur	St Johnstone	Loan
30 January 2012	Lewis Toshney	Celtic	Kilmarnock	Loan
30 January 2012	Juan Manuel Ortiz	Rangers	Almería	Loan
31 January 2012	Sean Higgins	St Johnstone	Ayr United	Loan
31 January 2012	Lee Cox	Inverness Caledonian Thistle	Swindon Town	Undisclosed
31 January 2012	Robert Ogleby	Heart of Midlothian	Wrexham	Free
31 January 2012	Evaldas Razulis	Heart of Midlothian	Kaunas	Free
31 January 2012	Murray Wallace	Falkirk	Huddersfield Town	Undisclosed
31 January 2012	Murray Wallace	Huddersfield Town	Falkirk	Loan
31 January 2012	Pa Saikou Kujabi	Unattached	Hibernian	Free
31 January 2012	John Potter	Dunfermline Athletic	Queen of the South	Loan
31 January 2012	Jordan McMillan	Rangers	Dunfermline Athletic	Undisclosed
31 January 2012	Jorge Claros	Motagua	Hibernian	Loan
31 January 2012	Jonathan Lindsay	Partick Thistle	Brechin City	Loan
31 January 2012	Kyle Hutton	Rangers	Dunfermline Athletic	Loan
31 January 2012	Roy O'Donovan	Coventry City	Hibernian	Loan
31 January 2012	Nikica Jelavić	Rangers	Everton	Undisclosed
31 January 2012	Matt Doherty	Wolverhampton Wanderers	Hibernian	Loan
31 January 2012	Paul Slane	Celtic	Milton Keynes Dons	Loan
31 January 2012	Kallum Higginbotham	Falkirk	Huddersfield Town	Undisclosed
31 January 2012	Danny Uchechi	FC Dender	Aberdeen	Free
31 January 2012	Graeme MacGregor	Bolton Wanderers	Hamilton Academical	Loan
31 January 2012	Jack Wernbly	Rangers	Albion Rovers	Loan
31 January 2012	Marc Dyer	Rangers	Ayr United	Loan
31 January 2012	Freddie Espling	Rangers	Djurgårdens IF	Free
31 January 2012	Nicolaj Kohlert	Rangers	Silkeborg IF	Free
1 February 2012	James Gibson	Hamilton Academical	Maybole	Free
1 February 2012	Steven Ross	Ross County	Forres Mechanics	Loan
2 February 2012	Willie Gibson	Crawley Town	Falkirk	Free
3 February 2012	John Sutton	Heart of Midlothian	Central Coast Mariners	Loan
6 February 2012	Keigan Parker	AFC Fylde	Ayr United	Free
6 February 2012	Tam McManus	Ayr United	Rochester Rhinos	Free
7 February 2012	Sean Welsh	Hibernian	Partick Thistle	Loan
7 February 2012	Daniel McKay	Kilmarnock	Albion Rovers	Free
8 February 2012	Dean Keenan	Ayr United	Troon	Free
8 February 2012	Connor Rennie	Dundee	Deveronvale	Undisclosed
9 February 2012	Lewis Milton	Hamilton Academical	Armadale Thistle	Loan
9 February 2012	Ciaran Johnston	Hamilton Academical	Armadale Thistle	Loan
9 February 2012	Victor Pálsson	Hibernian	New York Red Bulls	Free
9 February 2012	Ilias Haddad	St Mirren	CSKA Sofia	Free
9 February 2012	Chris Innes (Note: Innes left Inverness in the Summer of 2011.)	Inverness Caledonian Thistle	Arbroath	Free
10 February 2012	Michael Devlin	Hamilton Academical	Stenhousemuir	Loan
10 February 2012	Lee Johnson	Bristol City	Kilmarnock	Free
10 February 2012	Ross Smith	Dundee United	Peterhead	Loan
10 February 2012	Mark Campbell	Queen of the South	Irvine Meadow XI	Free
16 February 2012	Conrad Balatoni	Heart of Midlothian	Partick Thistle	Free
17 February 2012	Cameron MacDonald	Livingston	Airdrie United	Free
21 February 2012	Jamie Pollock	Motherwell	Clyde	Loan
21 February 2012	Carl Finnigan	St Johnstone	Dundee	Loan
21 February 2012	Michael Hart	Hibernian	St Johnstone	Free
23 February 2012	Craig Beattie	Swansea City	Heart of Midlothian	Free
23 February 2012	Patrick Ada	Kilmarnock	Burton Albion	Free
24 February 2012	Nick Feely	Celtic	Clyde	Loan
24 February 2012	Ross Naismith	Ross County	Nairn County	Loan
26 February 2012	Conner McGlinchey	Hamilton Academical	Berwick Rangers	Loan
28 February 2012	Jordon Forster	Hibernian	Berwick Rangers	Loan
29 February 2012	Alan Murdoch	Ayr United	Lugar Boswell Thistle	Loan
1 March 2012	Kenny Deuchar	Livingston	Stenhousemuir	Loan
1 March 2012	Leon Panikvar	Kilmarnock	Zalaegerszegi TE	Free
2 March 2012	Jason Thomson	Heart of Midlothian	Raith Rovers	Loan
2 March 2012	Jonny Stewart	Heart of Midlothian	Raith Rovers	Loan
3 March 2012	Akpo Sodje	Hibernian	Tianjin Teda	Free
7 March 2012	Mark Fotheringham	Livingston	Dundee	Free
8 March 2012	Craig Dargo	Partick Thistle	Dumbarton	Free
9 March 2012	Russell Duncan	Ross County	Peterhead	Loan
9 March 2012	Craig Thomson	Heart of Midlothian	Sūduva	Loan
9 March 2012	Kevin McBride	Hamilton Academical	Dundee	Free
10 March 2012	Ross Callachan	Raith Rovers	Musselburgh Athletic	Loan
10 March 2012	Colin Wilson	Raith Rovers	Musselburgh Athletic	Loan
10 March 2012	Matt McKay	Rangers	Busan IPark	Undisclosed
13 March 2012	Alan Combe	Unattached	Greenock Morton	Free
16 March 2012	Alex Cooper	Ross County	Elgin City	Loan
23 March 2012	Danny Handling	Hibernian	Berwick Rangers	Loan
25 March 2012	Ewan McNeil	Rangers	Airdrie United	Loan
29 March 2012	Nicky Devlin	Motherwell	Stenhousemuir	Loan
29 March 2012	Bernardo Domínguez	Huesca	Dunfermline Athletic	Free
29 March 2012	Kevin McCann	Greenock Morton	Livingston	Free
29 March 2012	Grant Anderson	Hamilton Academical	Stenhousemuir	Loan
29 March 2012	Kieran Millar	Hamilton Academical	Stenhousemuir	Loan
30 March 2012	Derek Riordan	Shaanxi Chanba	St Johnstone	Free
30 March 2012	Iain Flannigan	Partick Thistle	Greenock Morton	Free
30 March 2012	Creag Little	Greenock Morton	Largs Thistle	Loan
30 March 2012	Alistair Deans	Greenock Morton	Port Glasgow	Loan
30 March 2012	Mark McGuigan	Unattached	Partick Thistle	Free
12 April 2012	David Elebert	Hamilton Academical	Fylkir	Free
25 April 2012	Gavin Morrison	Inverness Caledonian Thistle	Grindavik	Loan
3 May 2012	Rhys Weston	Dundee	KR Reykjavik	Free

== See also ==
- List of Scottish football transfers summer 2011
- List of Scottish football transfers summer 2012
