= List of Scottish football transfers summer 2011 =

This is a list of Scottish football transfers featuring at least one 2011–12 Scottish Premier League club or one 2011–12 Scottish First Division club which were completed after the end of the 2010–11 season and before the end of the 2011 summer transfer window.

== May 2011 – August 2011 ==
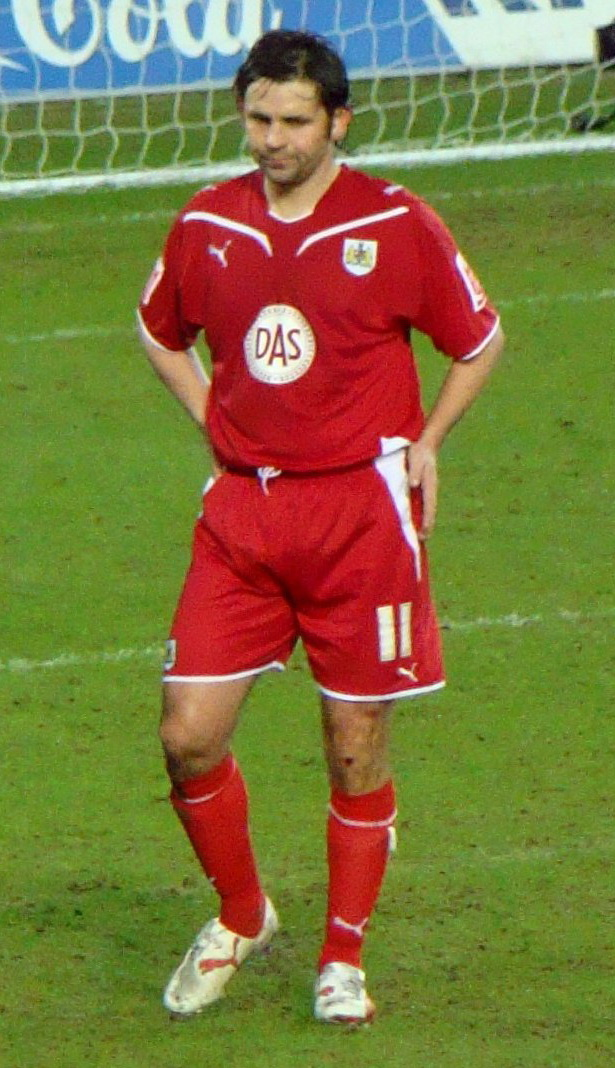
Aberdeen captain Paul Hartley announced his retirement at the age of 34 on 13 May. The former Scotland international hadn't played for Aberdeen since March due to a serious knee ligament injury. Despite having just declared the ended his career he became player/manager of Alloa Athletic just four days later, making it his eleventh club as player & first as manager.

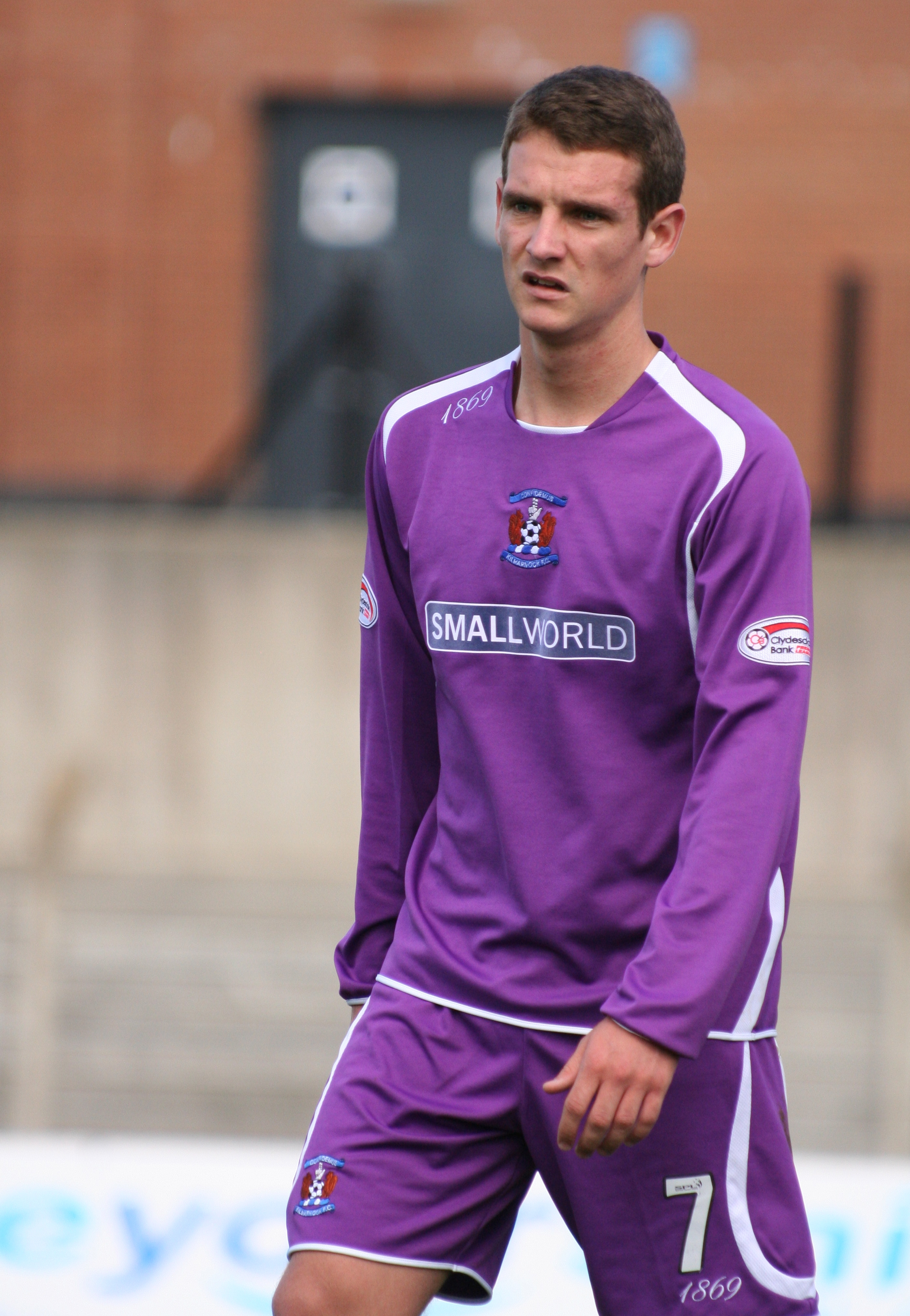
Craig Bryson signed for Derby County when he moved from Scottish club Kilmarnock in June 2011 for a fee of £350,000 rising to £450,000 upon appearances. Bryson had previously been on trial at the English club in 2007 before joining Kilmarnock from Clyde.

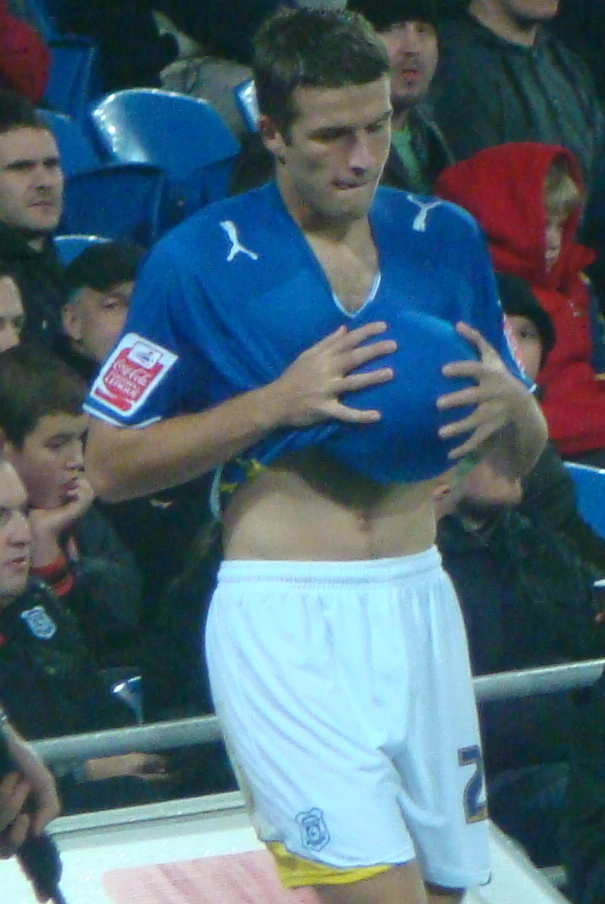
Adam Matthews joined Celtic on a pre-contract back in February from Welsh side Cardiff City, the fullback became an official Celtic player after signing a four-year contract, on 1 July, playing his first match for his new club a day later against Central Coast Mariners.

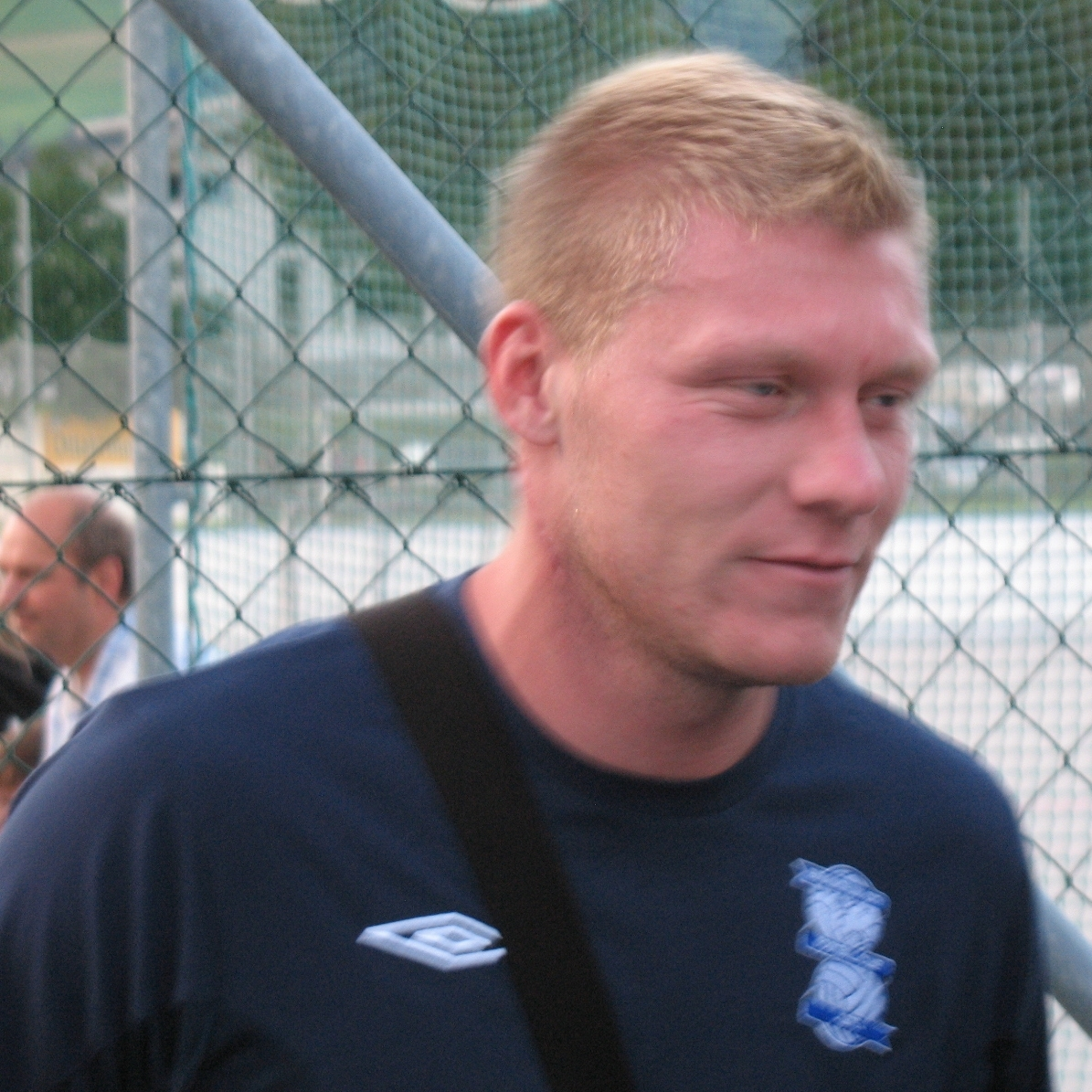
Garry O'Connor made a surprise move back to his former club Hibernian in June after his contract ran out in April at English club Barnsley, almost 5 years after he left the Scottish outfit for Russian club Lokomotiv Moscow.

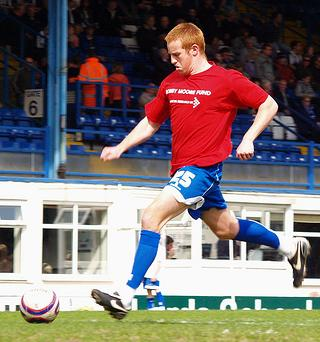
Irishman Adam Rooney made his return to English football, when he signed a 2-year contract with Birmingham City after leaving Inverness Caledonian Thistle on a free. The striker scored an impressive 24 league goals in the 2009–10 season & a further 15 league goals in the 2010–11 season.

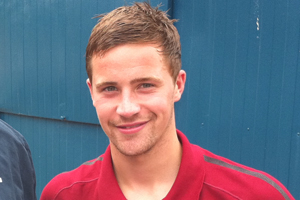
Chris Maguire left the SPL moving from Aberdeen to Championship side Derby County; compensation of £400,000 was agreed for the recently capped Scotland international due to his age.

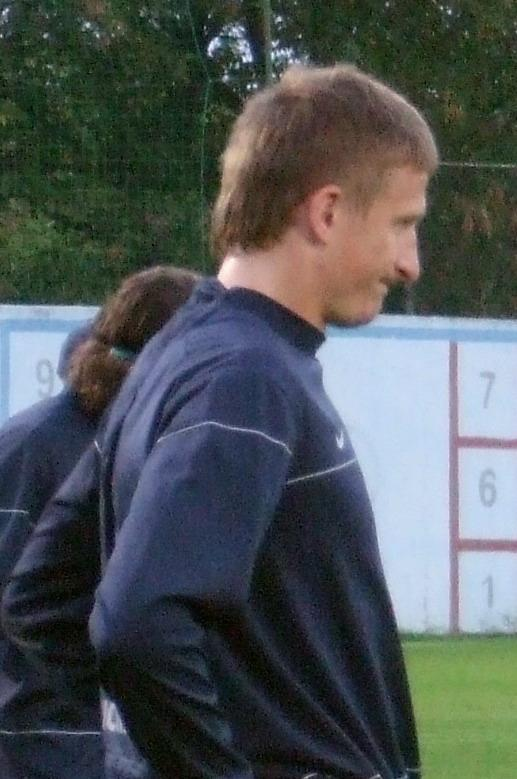
Dorin Goian became Rangers 3rd summer signing after the arrivals of Juan Manuel Ortiz & Lee Wallace. The experienced Romanian International signed a three-year contract with the SPL champions on 25 July after securing a move from Serie A side Palermo. After receiving a work permit on 28 July he made his debut for his new club the next day against St Johnstone in a league match.

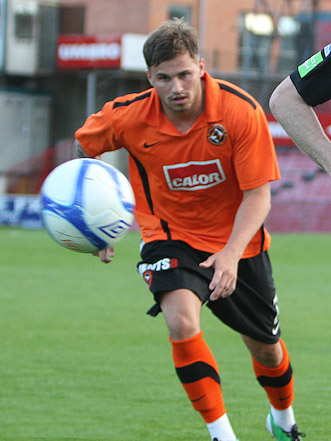
After having legal charges against him dropped on 25 July, David Goodwillie was able to focus on securing a move away from Dundee United. The much sought-after Scottish international striker who scored 18 goals in the 2010–11 season opted to sign a four-year contract with Premiership side Blackburn ending a protracted transfer saga in which Rangers also bid for the player.

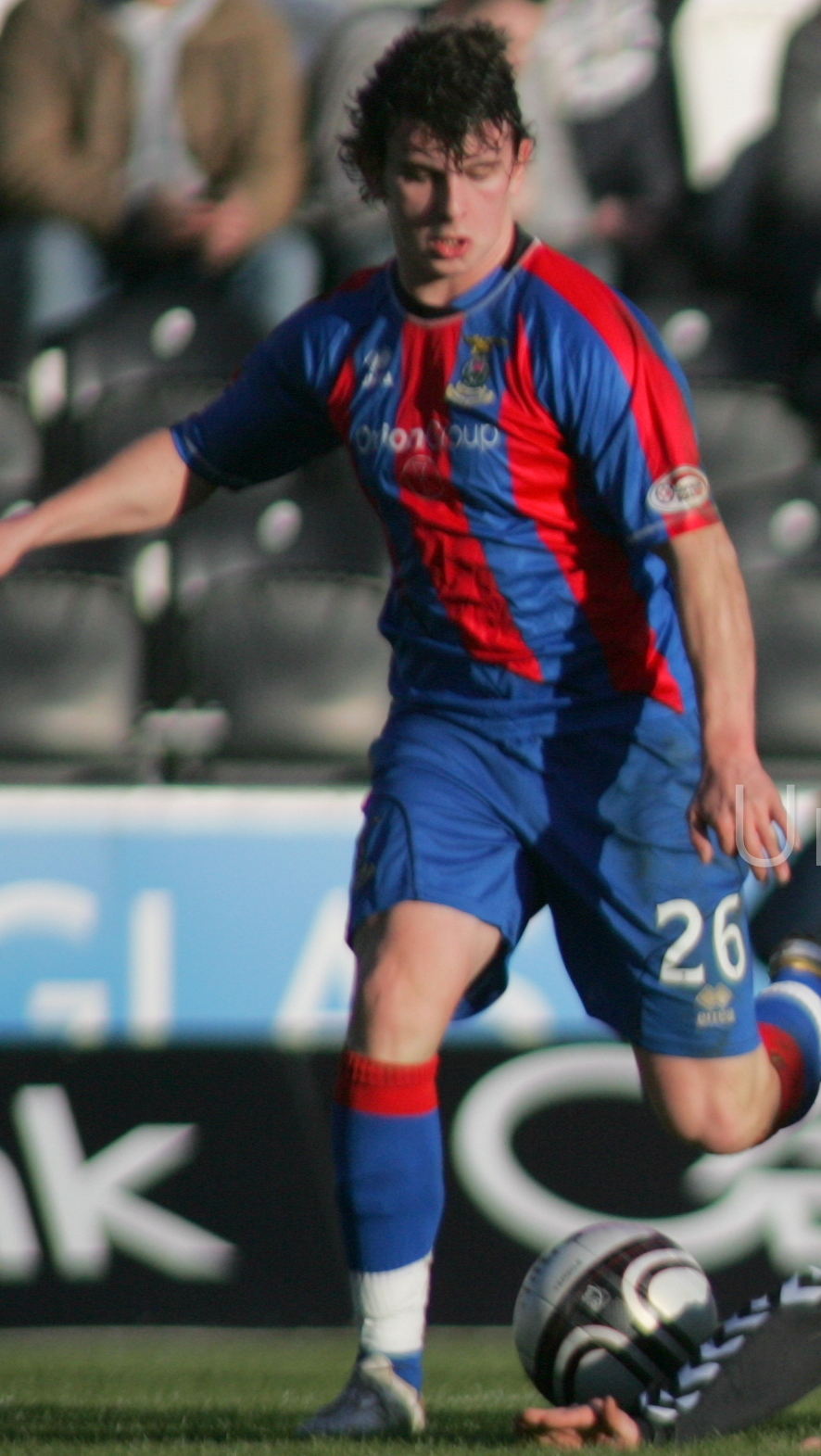
On 13 July Inverness Caledonian Thistle announced the club had agreed terms with Ireland Under-21 international Aaron Doran along with Billy McKay. Doran completed his move from Blackburn for an undisclosed fee on 21 July. He previously spent time on loan at Inverness in the latter part of the 2010–11 season scoring 3 goals.

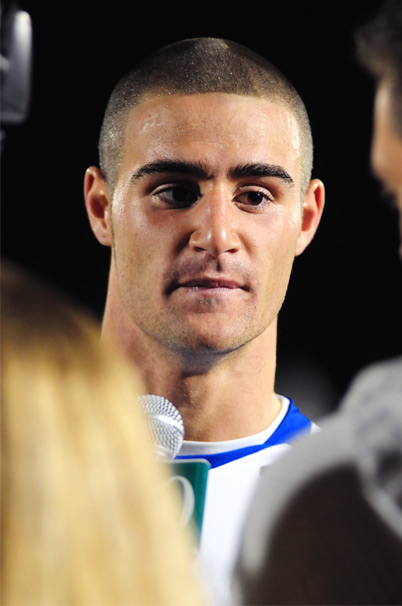
After spending the 2010–11 season on loan at St Johnstone where he made 14 appearances Marcus Haber was released by his parent club West Brom. The Canadian international who made his debut for his national side while on loan at The Saints made his move permanent on 22 July becoming their 9th summer signing.

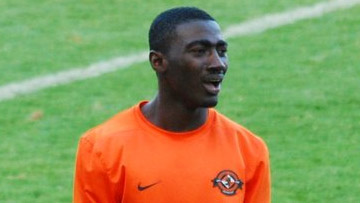
Ghanaian footballer Prince Buaben left Dundee United along with fellow footballers Craig Conway & Morgaro Gomis as the club could not meet the players wage demands. Bauben spent 4 seasons in Scotland after leaving Ajax due to residential issues before moving to England to join Championship side Watford on 14 July.

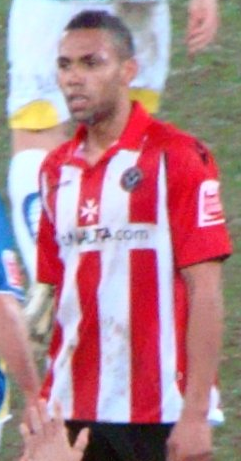
Kyle Bartley rejoined Rangers on a season long loan on 4 August a day after he signed a new contract with Arsenal. Kyle spent the latter part of the 2010–11 season on loan at Ibrox. His previous loan period with the SPL champions was limited to 9 appearances due to injury.

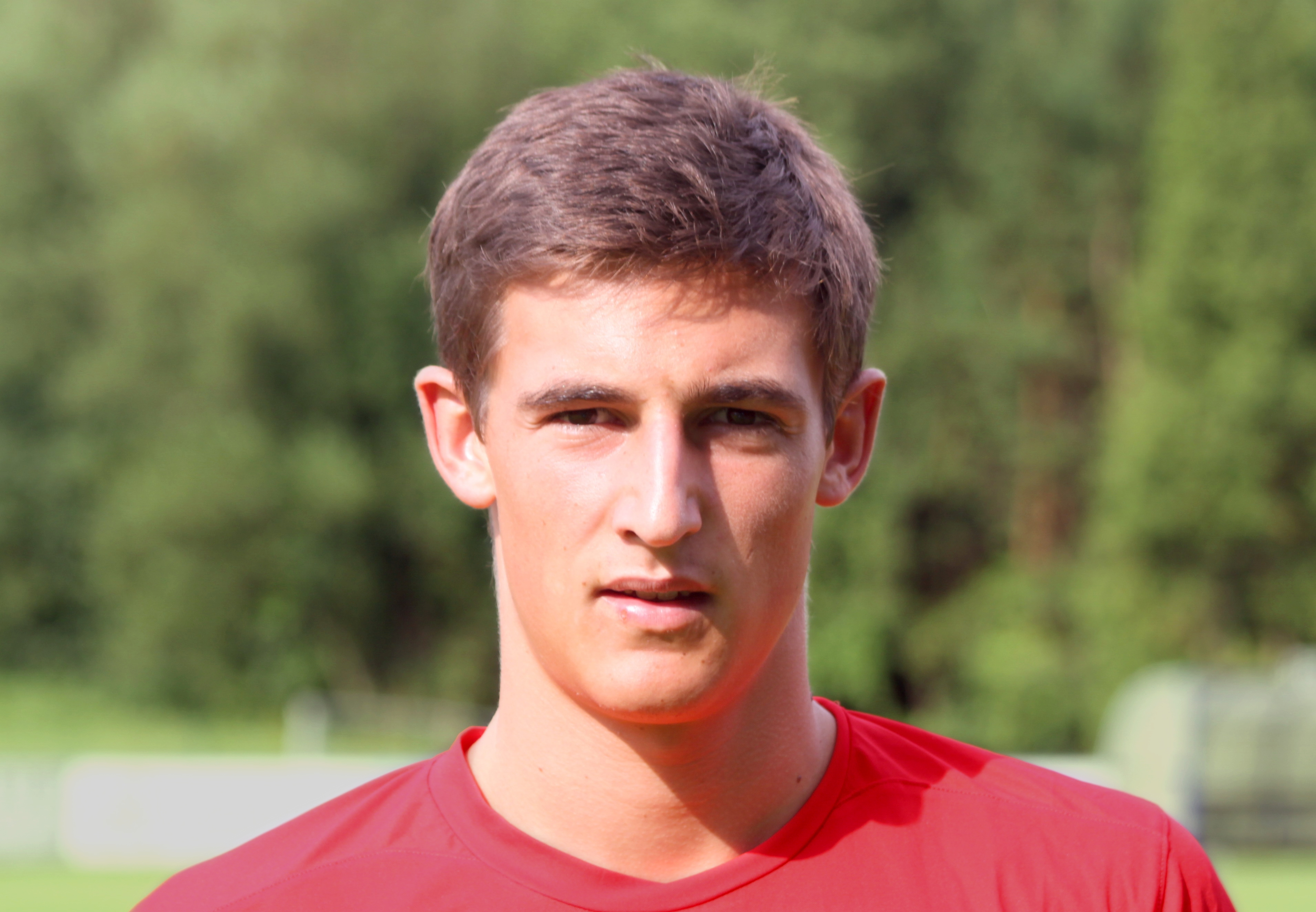
Thomas Piermayr became Inverness's eight summer signing on 23 July. The Austrian under-21 international signed a one-year deal with the Caley Thistle after securing a Free transfer move from recently relegated Austrian First Division side LASK Linz.

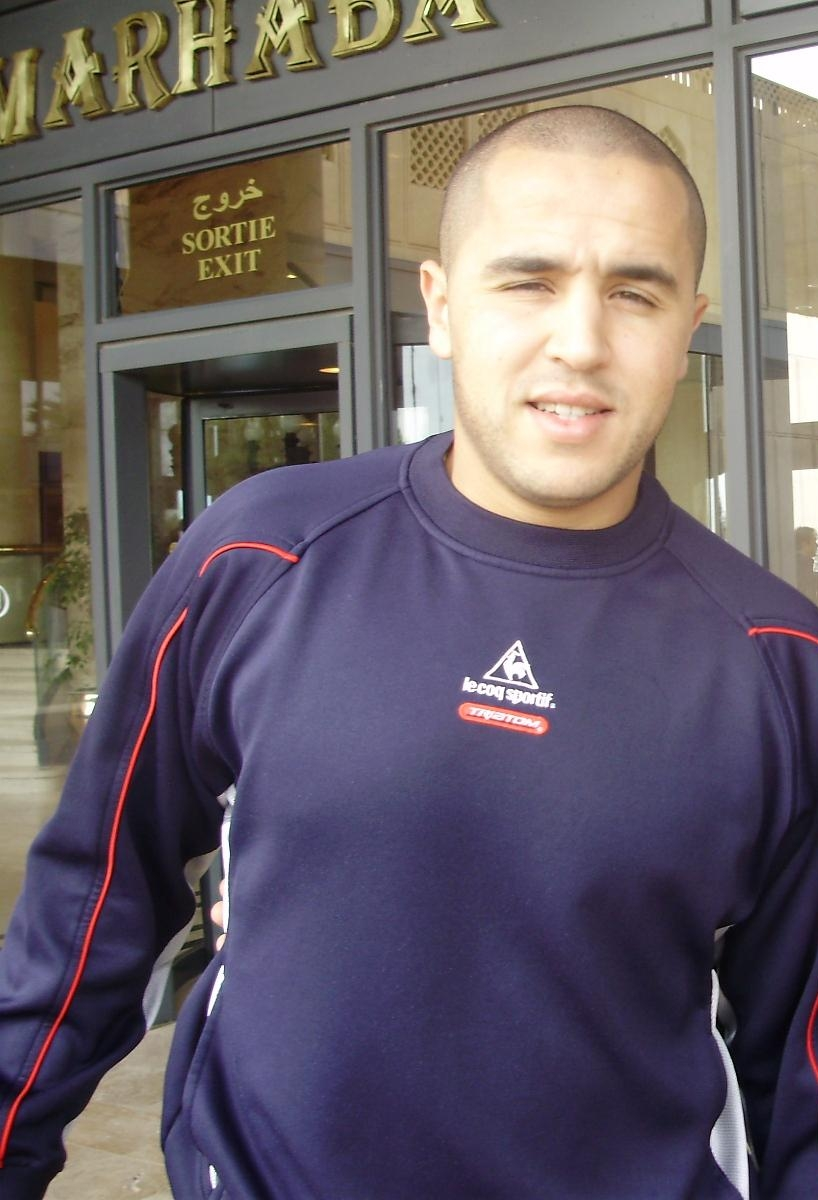
Madjid Bougherra left Rangers for Qatari side Lekhiwaya following the arrivals of Dorin Goian & Kyle Bartley. Bougherra a French born Algerian international was expected to move back to England where he previously played for Sheffield Wednesday & Charlton. However on 10 August he decided to move to the Middle East joining Ivorian’s Aruna Dindane & Bakari Koné at Lekhiwaya.

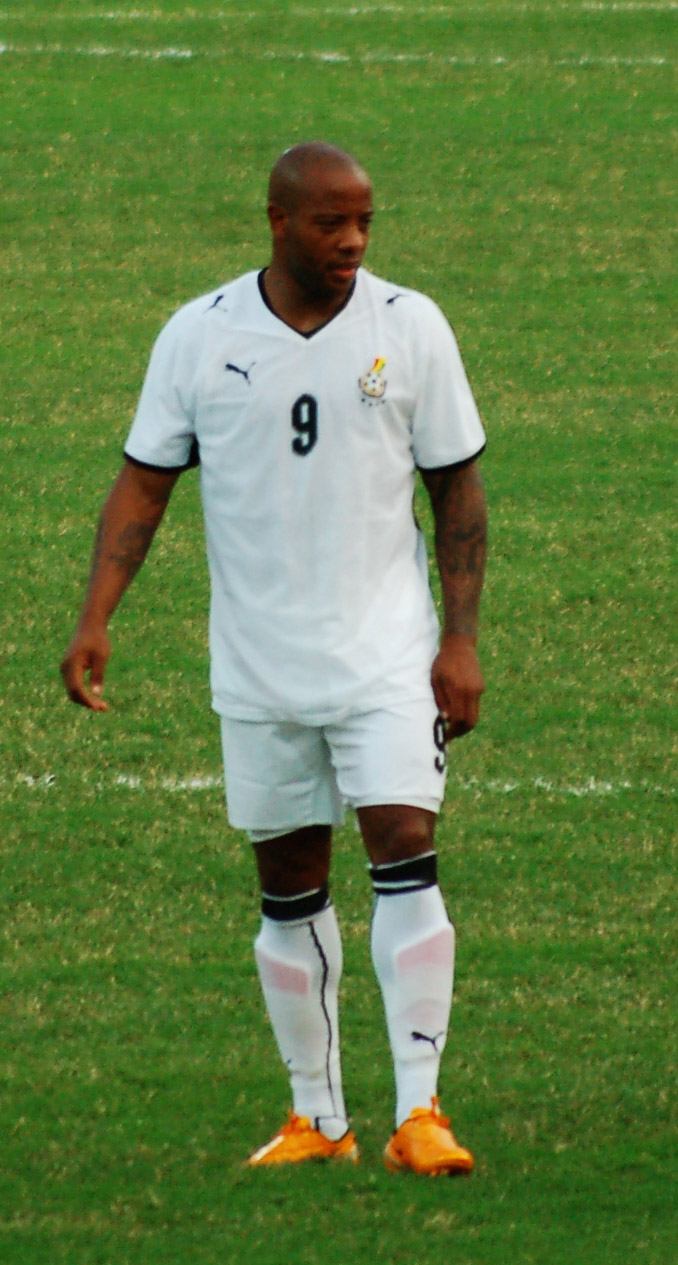
Junior Agogo the much travelled Ghanaian international signed for Hibernian on 26 July making them his fifteenth club. Having played in England, America, Egypt & most recently Cyprus with Apollon Limassol, it will be his first experience of Scottish football. Agogo will offer Hibenian significant experience having represented his country on 27 occasions & being part of Ghana’s 2008 Africa Cup of Nations squad. He will compete with fellow new arrival Garry O’Connor, loanee Phil Airey, Akpo Sodje & youngsters Danny Handling, Ross Caldwell for starting place up front.

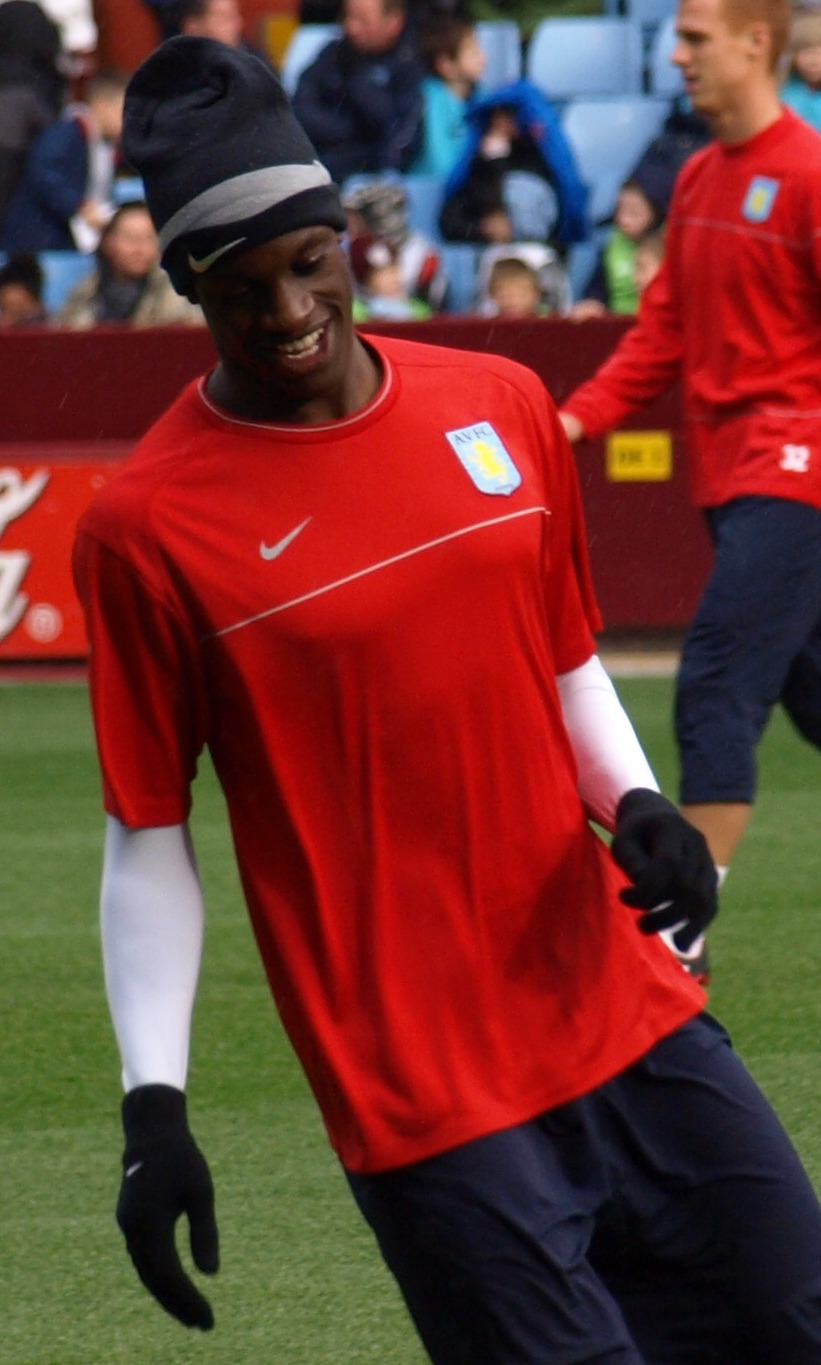
Isaiah Osbourne joined Hibernian on 10 August following in the footsteps of his older brother Isaac who also left England for Scotland this summer signing for Aberdeen. After his release from Aston Villa he went on trial at Leeds however he choose to sign for Hibernain.

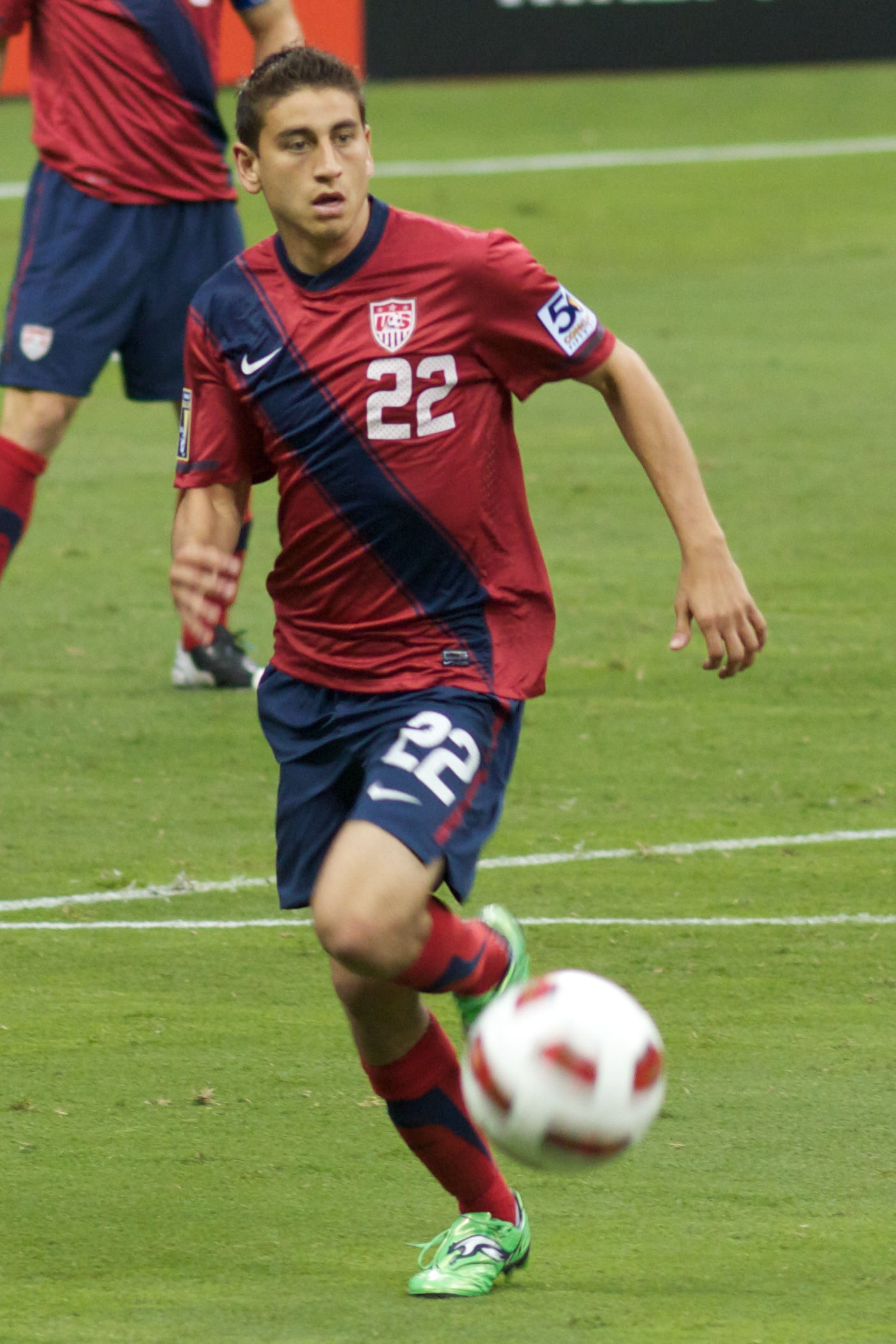
USA international Alejandro Bedoya joined Rangers on 17 August becoming their 5th summer signing. After leaving college football he joined Swedish side Örebro in 2009. Initially Rangers had agreed to sign Bedoya on a pre-contract with him moving to Glasgow in January 2012 but after the two clubs reach an agreement for an undisclosed fee he was allowed move immediately.

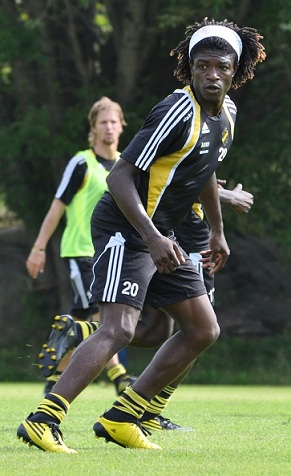
Mohamed Bangura became Celtic's sixth summer signing on the penultimate day of summer transfer window. The Sierra Leone international comes to Parkhead from Swedish side AIK for a fee of approximately £2.2million. Bangura had only been with AIK for one season having signed from Kallon in his homeland after impressing whilst on loan at Swedish lower division side Värnamo.

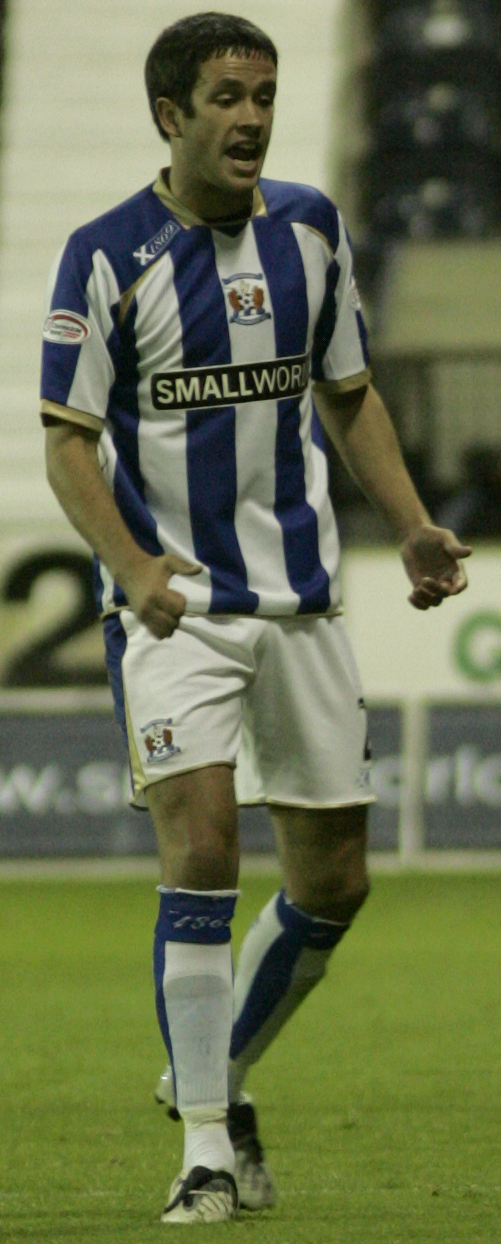
Having played for Kilmarnock for four years, Tim Clancy was released in the summer of 2011. The experienced SPL player who also had spells in Ireland & England remained in Scotland joining Motherwell with the North Lanarkshire side needing a replacement for injured Steven Saunders.

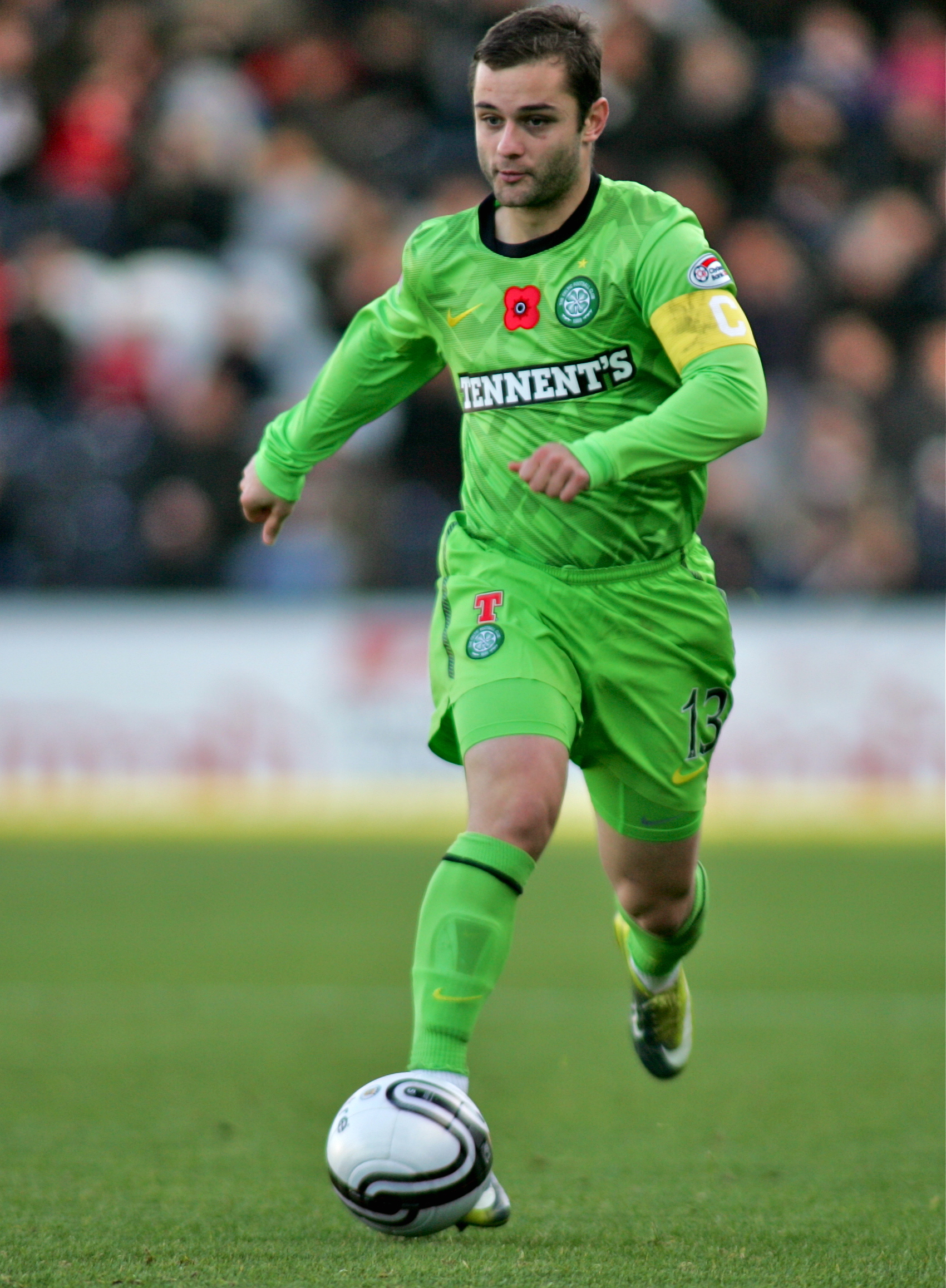
Shaun Maloney departed Scotland for the Premier League in a one million pound transfer from Celtic to Wigan on transfer deadline day. Malaysian born Maloney had previously left Celtic for a similar fee joining former Hoops manager Martin O'Neill at Aston Villa before rejoining Celtic for £3 million.

Date	Name	Moving from	Moving to	Fee
12 May 2011	Grant Evans	Hamilton Academical	Greenock Morton	Free
14 May 2011	Kevin Brown	Raith Rovers	BÍ/Bolungarvík	Free
17 May 2011	Paul Hartley	Aberdeen	Alloa Athletic	Free
17 May 2011	Brian Graham	Greenock Morton	Raith Rovers	Free
17 May 2011	Ryan Logan	Raith Rovers	Heart of Midlothian	Free
17 May 2011	David Robertson	Dundee United	St Johnstone	Free
17 May 2011	John Rankin	Hibernian	Dundee United	Free
17 May 2011	Roy McBain	Inverness Caledonian Thistle	Peterhead	Free
18 May 2011	Ivan Sproule	Bristol City	Hibernian	Free
18 May 2011	Andy Graham	Hamilton Academical	Greenock Morton	Free
18 May 2011	Paul di Giacomo	Ross County	Greenock Morton	Free
18 May 2011	Colin McMenamin	Queen of the South	Ross County	Free
18 May 2011	Ross Forsyth	Stirling Albion	Greenock Morton	Free
18 May 2011	Christopher Malone	Livingston	Airdrie United	Free
18 May 2011	Lewis Bonar	Falkirk	Stirling Albion	Free
20 May 2011	Sean Higgins	Dundee	St Johnstone	Free
20 May 2011	Allan Jenkins	Greenock Morton	Ballymena United	Free
22 May 2011	Stuart Golabek	Inverness Caledonian Thistle	Brora Rangers	Free
24 May 2011	Willo Flood	Middlesbrough	Dundee United	Free
24 May 2011	Grant Munro	Inverness Caledonian Thistle	Ross County	Free
24 May 2011	Graham Weir	Raith Rovers	Brechin City	Free
25 May 2011	Danny Grainger	St Johnstone	Heart of Midlothian	Free
25 May 2011	Jamie Hamill	Kilmarnock	Heart of Midlothian	Free
25 May 2011	John Sutton	Motherwell	Heart of Midlothian	Free
26 May 2011	Callum Davidson	Preston North End	St Johnstone	Free
26 May 2011	Jonathan Lindsay	St Johnstone	Partick Thistle	Free
27 May 2011	Willie McLaren	Queen of the South	Hamilton Academical	Free
27 May 2011	Josh Robinson	Linfield	Rangers	Free
27 May 2011	Jordan Elfverson	Dundee United	Arbroath	Free
29 May 2011	Kevin Kelbie	Greenock Morton	Glenavon	Free
31 May 2011	Paul Burns	Queen of the South	Dunfermline Athletic	Free
31 May 2011	Graham Bayne	Dunfermline Athletic	Dundee	Free
31 May 2011	Cleveland Taylor	St Johnstone	Burton Albion	Free
1 June 2011	Michael Duberry	St Johnstone	Oxford United	Free
1 June 2011	Steven Thompson	Burnley	St Mirren	Free
1 June 2011	Kevin Rutkiewicz	St Johnstone	Dunfermline Athletic	Free
1 June 2011	Joe Hamill	Livingston	Raith Rovers	Free
1 June 2011	Matty Hughes	Celtic	Fleetwood Town	Free
2 June 2011	Patrick Boyle	Partick Thistle	Dunfermline Athletic	Free
3 June 2011	Liam Miller	Hibernian	Perth Glory	Free
3 June 2011	Youl Mawéné	Panserraikos	Aberdeen	Free
3 June 2011	Michael Higdon	St Mirren	Motherwell	Free
3 June 2011	Andrew Barrowman	Ross County	Dunfermline Athletic	Free
3 June 2011	Frazer Wright	Kilmarnock	St Johnstone	Free
3 June 2011	Aaron Conway	Livingston	Peterhead	Free
4 June 2011	Garry Brady	St Mirren	Brechin City	Free
4 June 2011	Sean Fitzharris	Celtic	Greenock Morton	Free
6 June 2011	Nigel Hasselbaink	Hamilton Academical	St Mirren	Free
6 June 2011	Paul McGowan	Celtic	St Mirren	Free
7 June 2011	Scott Bain	Aberdeen	Alloa Athletic	Free
7 June 2011	Jordan Robertson	St Johnstone	Scunthorpe United	Free
7 June 2011	Grégory Tadé	Raith Rovers	Inverness Caledonian Thistle	Free
8 June 2011	Calum Woods	Dunfermline Athletic	Huddersfield Town	Free
8 June 2011	Greg Tansey	Stockport County	Inverness Caledonian Thistle	Free
9 June 2011	Craig Bryson	Kilmarnock	Derby County	£350,000
9 June 2011	Paul Gallacher	St Mirren	Dunfermline Athletic	Free
9 June 2011	Graeme Smith	St Johnstone	St Mirren	Free
9 June 2011	Andy Jackson	St Johnstone	Greenock Morton	Free
9 June 2011	Michael Fraser	Birkirkara	Ross County	Free
9 June 2011	James Wightman	Celtic	Partick Thistle	Free
9 June 2011	Aaron Sekhon	Falkirk	Partick Thistle	Free
13 June 2011	Darren Dods	Dundee United	Falkirk	Free
13 June 2011	Dylan McGowan	Heart of Midlothian	Gold Coast United	Loan
13 June 2011	Ryan McCord	Dundee United	Alloa Athletic	Free
13 June 2011	Ross McCord	Dundee United	Alloa Athletic	Free
14 June 2011	Mehdi Taouil	Kilmarnock	Heart of Midlothian	Free
14 June 2011	Kurtis Byrne	Hibernian	Ross County	Free
14 June 2011	Russell Duncan	Inverness Caledonian Thistle	Ross County	Free
14 June 2011	Andy Rodgers	Ayr United	Stenhousemuir	Free
15 June 2011	Paul Heffernan	Sheffield Wednesday	Kilmarnock	Free
15 June 2011	Garry O'Connor	Barnsley	Hibernian	Free
15 June 2011	Devon Jacobs	Livingston	Stirling Albion	Free
16 June 2011	Morgaro Gomis	Dundee United	Birmingham City	Free
16 June 2011	Sam Morrow	Tranmere Rovers	Ross County	Free
16 June 2011	Greg Paterson	Dunfermline Athletic	Forfar Athletic	Free
17 June 2011	Rui Miguel	Kilmarnock	Académica de Coimbra	Free
17 June 2011	Sean O'Hanlon	Milton Keynes Dons	Hibernian	Free
17 June 2011	Rocco Quinn	Queen of the South	Ross County	Free
17 June 2011	Stephen Simmons	Raith Rovers	Queen of the South	Free
17 June 2011	Neil Duffy	St Johnstone	Peterhead	Free
18 June 2011	David Lilley	Queen of the South	Airdrie United	Free
19 June 2011	Dawid Kucharski	Heart of Midlothian	Pogoń Szczecin	Free
20 June 2011	Ryan Conroy	Celtic	Dundee	Free
20 June 2011	Steven Milne	Ross County	Dundee	Free
20 June 2011	Jake Hyde	Dunfermline Athletic	Dundee	Free
20 June 2011	Grant Anderson	Stenhousemuir	Hamilton Academical	Free
20 June 2011	John Potter	St Mirren	Dunfermline Athletic	Free
20 June 2011	Jordan Moffat	Celtic	Partick Thistle	Free
20 June 2011	Dale Keenan	Celtic	Partick Thistle	Free
20 June 2011	Bradley Halsman	Motherwell	Partick Thistle	Free
20 June 2011	Gavin Griffin	Motherwell	Partick Thistle	Free
21 June 2011	Gary Harkins	Dundee	Kilmarnock	Free
21 June 2011	Patrick Ada	Crewe Alexandra	Kilmarnock	Free
21 June 2011	Tom Aldred	Watford	Inverness Caledonian Thistle	Loan
21 June 2011	Danny Racchi	York City	Kilmarnock	Free
21 June 2011	Ross Chisholm	Arbroath	Dundee	Free
21 June 2011	Craig Forsyth	Dundee	Watford	Free
21 June 2011	Darren Young	Greenock Morton	Alloa Athletic	Free
21 June 2011	Chris Moir	Inverness Caledonian Thistle	Brora Rangers	Free
22 June 2011	Michael O'Byrne	Livingston	Albion Rovers	Free
23 June 2011	Craig Conway	Dundee United	Cardiff City	Free
23 June 2011	Aaron McGregor	Unattached	Rangers	Free
23 June 2011	Raffaele De Vita	Livingston	Swindon Town	Free
23 June 2011	Gary McDonald	Hamilton Academical	Morecambe	Free
23 June 2011	David McCracken	Brentford	St Johnstone	Free
23 June 2011	Graeme Holmes	Greenock Morton	Alloa Athletic	Free
24 June 2011	Carl Finnigan	Falkirk	St Johnstone	Free
25 June 2011	Mark Campbell	Raith Rovers	Queen of the South	Free
25 June 2011	Kevin Smith	Notts County	Queen of the South	Free
27 June 2011	Colin Nish	Hibernian	Hartlepool United	Free
27 June 2011	Gareth Wardlaw	St Mirren	Ayr United	Free
27 June 2011	Michael McGowan	Alloa Athletic	Ayr United	Free
27 June 2011	John Robertson	Partick Thistle	Ayr United	Free
27 June 2011	Kevin Cuthbert	Greenock Morton	Ayr United	Free
27 June 2011	Andy Geggan	Dumbarton	Ayr United	Free
27 June 2011	Scott Davidson	Falkirk	Stirling Albion	Loan
28 June 2011	Chris Clark	Plymouth Argyle	Aberdeen	Free
28 June 2011	Stewart Kean	Greenock Morton	Stenhousemuir	Free
29 June 2011	Chris Maguire	Aberdeen	Derby County	£400,000
29 June 2011	David González Giraldo	Manchester City	Aberdeen	Loan
29 June 2011	Adam Rooney	Inverness Caledonian Thistle	Birmingham City	Free
29 June 2011	Dean Lyness	Heart of Midlothian	Kidderminster Harriers	Free
30 June 2011	Isaac Osbourne	Coventry City	Aberdeen	Free
30 June 2011	Zdeněk Kroča	Luton Town	Kilmarnock	Free
30 June 2011	Ryan Frances	St Mirren	East Stirlingshire	Free
1 July 2011	Dylan McGeouch	Rangers	Celtic	Free
1 July 2011	Nicky Devlin	Dumbarton	Motherwell	Free
1 July 2011	Kelvin Wilson	Nottingham Forest	Celtic	Free
1 July 2011	Adam Matthews	Cardiff City	Celtic	Free
1 July 2011	Myles Anderson	Aberdeen	Blackburn Rovers	Free
1 July 2011	Tom Skogsrud	Manchester City	Rangers	Free
1 July 2011	Kim Skogsrud	Manchester City	Rangers	Free
1 July 2011	Nicky Law	Rotherham	Motherwell	Free
1 July 2011	Mark Stewart	Falkirk	Bradford City	Free
1 July 2011	Chris Mitchell	Falkirk	Bradford City	Free
1 July 2011	Danny Buijs	Den Haag	Kilmarnock	Free
1 July 2011	Gary Teale	Sheffield Wednesday	St Mirren	Free
1 July 2011	Bobby Olejnik	Falkirk	Torquay United	Free
1 July 2011	Jordan McKechnie	Raith Rovers	Annan Athletic	Free
1 July 2011	David Hutton	Queen of the South	Hamilton Academical	Free
1 July 2011	Craig Wedderburn	Raith Rovers	Arbroath	Free
1 July 2011	Jordan White	Dunfermline Athletic	Drogheda United	Free
1 July 2011	Murray Christie	Heart of Midlothian	Cowdenbeath	Free
1 July 2011	Jamie McCormack	Heart of Midlothian	Wigan Athletic	Free
1 July 2011	Kieran Stallard	Falkirk	Airdrie United	Free
1 July 2011	Lewis Davidson	Aberdeen	Peterhead	Free
3 July 2011	Thomas Flynn	Hibernian	Cowdenbeath	Free
4 July 2011	Marc Twaddle	Falkirk	Rochdale	Free
4 July 2011	Zander Clark	St Johnstone	Elgin City	Loan
4 July 2011	Conor Ramsay	St Mirren	Greenock Morton	Free
4 July 2011	Creag Little	St Mirren	Greenock Morton	Free
4 July 2011	Andrew Shinnie	Rangers	Inverness Caledonian Thistle	Free
4 July 2011	Josh Meekings	Ipswich Town	Inverness Caledonian Thistle	Free
4 July 2011	Chris Higgins	Dunfermline Athletic	Queen of the South	Free
5 July 2011	Peter MacDonald	St Johnstone	Greenock Morton	Free
5 July 2011	Archie Campbell	Rangers	Greenock Morton	Free
5 July 2011	Darren McGeough	Stranraer	Greenock Morton	Free
5 July 2011	Robert Ogleby	Heart of Midlothian	East Fife	Loan
5 July 2011	Matthew Park	Heart of Midlothian	East Fife	Loan
6 July 2011	Juan Manuel Ortiz	Almería	Rangers	£500,000
6 July 2011	Aaron Sinclair	Montrose	Partick Thistle	Undisclosed
6 July 2011	Gavin Skelton	Hamilton Academical	Barrow	Free
6 July 2011	Aaron Connelly	Ayr United	Cumnock Juniors	Free
6 July 2011	Darryl Jones	Ayr United	Cumnock Juniors	Free
7 July 2011	Jason Thomson	Heart of Midlothian	Dunfemline	Loan
7 July 2011	Derek Riordan	Hibernian	Shaanxi Chanba	Free
7 July 2011	Eric Odhiambo	Inverness Caledonian Thistle	Denizlispor	Free
7 July 2011	Stephen Reynolds	St Johnstone	Raith Rovers	Loan
7 July 2011	Danny Invincibile	St Johnstone	Ermis Aradippou	Free
8 July 2011	Graham Carey	Celtic	St Mirren	Free
8 July 2011	Niall McGinn	Celtic	Brentford	Loan
8 July 2011	Jonathan Brown	Heart of Midlothian	Livingston	Free
8 July 2011	Alistair Woodburn	Ayr United	Airdrie United	Free
8 July 2011	Scott McLaughlin	Ayr United	Queen of the South	Free
9 July 2011	Victor Wanyama	K. Beerschot AC	Celtic	£1,000,000
9 July 2011	Derek Holmes	Queen of the South	Airdrie United	Free
9 July 2011	Sean Lynch	St Mirren	Airdrie United	Free
9 July 2011	Graeme Ramage	St Mirren	Dumbarton	Free
10 July 2011	Andis Shala	Dundee United	Hallescher FC	Free
11 July 2011	Jamie Mackie	Raith Rovers	Tayport	Free
11 July 2011	Aaron Scott	Dunfermline Athletic	Dunbar United	Free
12 July 2011	Gary Mackay-Steven	Airdrie United	Dundee United	Free
12 July 2011	William Easton	Ayr United	Kirkintilloch Rob Roy	Free
13 July 2011	Zander Diamond	Aberdeen	Oldham Athletic	Free
13 July 2011	Michael Doyle	Kilmarnock	Alloa Athletic	Free
13 July 2011	Craig McDowall	Livingston	Alloa Athletic	Free
13 July 2011	Zaine Francis-Angol	Tottenham Hotspur	Motherwell	Free
13 July 2011	Kris Irvine	Dundee United	Clyde	Free
13 July 2011	Ryan Kane	Greenock Morton	Clyde	Free
13 July 2011	Filip Mentel	Dundee United	Clyde	Loan
13 July 2011	Craig Wilson	Raith Rovers	Forfar Athletic	Free
13 July 2011	Conrad Balatoni	Heart of Midlothian	Partick Thistle	Loan
14 July 2011	Prince Buaben	Dundee United	Watford	Free
14 July 2011	Ryan Flynn	Falkirk	Sheffield United	Undisclosed
14 July 2011	Mickaël Antoine-Curier	Hamilton Academical	Ermis Aradippou	Free
14 July 2011	Rhys Bennett	Bolton Wanderers	Falkirk	Loan
14 July 2011	Max Wright	Rangers	Alloa Athletic	Free
15 July 2011	Jeroen Tesselaar	AZ Alkmaar	St Mirren	Free
15 July 2011	Rory McKeown	Ipswich Town	Kilmarnock	Free
15 July 2011	Jordan Morton	Heart of Midlothian	Cowdenbeath	Loan
16 July 2011	Euan Lindsay	Hamilton Academical	Largs Thistle	Free
16 July 2011	Michael Andrews	Falkirk	Montrose	Free
16 July 2011	Mark McLennan	St Mirren	Irvine Meadow XI	Free
16 July 2011	Ross Naismith	Ross County	Huntly	Loan
17 July 2011	Derek Lyle	Greenock Morton	Hamilton Academical	Free
18 July 2011	Kári Árnason	Plymouth Argyle	Aberdeen	Free
19 July 2011	Ben Hutchinson	Celtic	Kilmarnock	Free
19 July 2011	Nathan Shepherd	Greenock Morton	Stranraer	Free
19 July 2011	Lee Bryce	Raith Rovers	Arbroath	Free
19 July 2011	Kevin McKinlay	Greenock Morton	Stenhousemuir	Free
19 July 2011	Nicky Clark	Peterhead	Queen of the South	Free
20 July 2011	Jason Brown	Blackburn Rovers	Aberdeen	Free
20 July 2011	Ally Love	St Mirren	East Stirlingshire	Free
20 July 2011	Michael McGovern	Ross County	Falkirk	Free
20 July 2011	Michael Deland	Heart of Midlothian	Berwick Rangers	Free
20 July 2011	Jamie Barclay	Falkirk	Berwick Rangers	Free
20 July 2011	Brian McQueen	Hamilton Academical	Clyde	Free
21 July 2011	Cillian Sheridan	CSKA Sofia	St Johnstone	Loan
21 July 2011	Alan Mannus	Shamrock Rovers	St Johnstone	Free
21 July 2011	Peter Innes	Motherwell	Alloa Athletic	Free
21 July 2011	Robert Harris	Queen of the South	Blackpool	Free
21 July 2011	Tom Brighton	Stirling Albion	Queen of the South	Free
21 July 2011	Lee Wallace	Heart of Midlothian	Rangers	£1,500,000
21 July 2011	Neil McGregor	Dunfermline Athletic	Dundee	Free
21 July 2011	Aaron Doran	Blackburn Rovers	Inverness Caledonian Thistle	Undisclosed
21 July 2011	Billy McKay	Northampton Town	Inverness Caledonian Thistle	Free
21 July 2011	Ross Hyslop	Queen of the South	Annan Athletic	Free
22 July 2011	Danny Thomson	Heart of Midlothian	Raith Rovers	Loan
22 July 2011	Mark Ridgers	Heart of Midlothian	East Fife	Loan
22 July 2011	Evaldas Razulis	Heart of Midlothian	Kaunas	Loan
22 July 2011	Alan Reid	Unattached	Queen of the South	Free
22 July 2011	Farid El Alagui	Romorantin	Falkirk	Free
22 July 2011	Graeme Beveridge	Raith Rovers	Elgin City	Free
22 July 2011	Jamie McCluskey	St Mirren	Dundee	Free
22 July 2011	Marcus Haber	West Bromwich Albion	St Johnstone	Free
23 July 2011	Thomas Piermayr	LASK Linz	Inverness Caledonian Thistle	Free
23 July 2011	Rory Boulding	Accrington Stanley	Livingston	Free
23 July 2011	Calum Antell	Hibernian	East Stirlingshire	Loan
23 July 2011	Gavin MacPherson	Falkirk	Stirling Albion	Free
24 July 2011	Alex Burke	Dunfermline Athletic	Ayr United	Free
24 July 2011	Liam Sloan	Motherwell	East Kilbride Thistle	Free
25 July 2011	Francisco Sandaza	Brighton & Hove Albion	St Johnstone	Free
25 July 2011	Alan Martin	Ayr United	Crewe Alexandra	Free
25 July 2011	Steven Meechan	Motherwell	Kettering Town	Free
25 July 2011	Dorin Goian	Palermo	Rangers	Undisclosed
25 July 2011	Deividas Kapustas	Heart of Midlothian	Kaunas	Free
26 July 2011	Efraín Juárez	Celtic	Real Zaragoza	Loan
26 July 2011	Andrew McNeil	Raith Rovers	Livingston	Free
26 July 2011	Junior Agogo	Apollon Limassol	Hibernian	Free
26 July 2011	Peter Bradley	St Mirren	Queen's Park	Free
27 July 2011	Ewan Moyes	Hibernian	Gateshead	Free
28 July 2011	Owain Tudur Jones	Norwich City	Inverness Caledonian Thistle	Free
28 July 2011	Lee Robinson	Unattached	Queen of the South	Free
28 July 2011	Marc McCusker	Clyde	Queen of the South	Free
28 July 2011	Darren Smith	Ross County	Stirling Albion	Free
28 July 2011	Archie MacPhee	Ross County	Elgin City	Loan
28 July 2011	Stirling Smith	Aberdeen	Alloa Athletic	Free
29 July 2011	Ryan McCann	Ayr United	Stockport County	Free
29 July 2011	Dean Shiels	Doncaster Rovers	Kilmarnock	Loan
29 July 2011	Scott Robertson	Fram Reykjavík	Partick Thistle	Free
29 July 2011	Jack Compton	Falkirk	Bradford City	Loan
29 July 2011	Grant Adam	Rangers	Forfar Athletic	Loan
29 July 2011	Sean Murdoch	Hamilton Academical	Accrington Stanley	Free
29 July 2011	David Buchanan	Hamilton Academical	Tranmere Rovers	Free
29 July 2011	Derek Young	Aberdeen	Grindavík	Free
31 July 2011	Craig Thomson	Heart of Midlothian	Kaunas	Loan
1 August 2011	Flávio Paixão	Hamilton Academical	Tractor Sazi	Free
2 August 2011	Steven Ross	Ross County	Brora Rangers	Loan
2 August 2011	Brian McLean	Falkirk	Preston North End	Free
3 August 2011	David Goodwillie	Dundee United	Blackburn Rovers	£2,000,000
4 August 2011	Ricardo Vaz Tê	Hibernian	Barnsley	Free
4 August 2011	Darren O'Dea	Celtic	Leeds United	Loan
4 August 2011	Kyle Bartley	Arsenal	Rangers	Loan
5 August 2011	Jamie McKernon	St Mirren	Ayr United	Loan
6 August 2011	Michael Ordish	Celtic	Southport	Free
9 August 2011	Matt Paterson	Southend United	Hamilton Academical	Loan
9 August 2011	Ismaël Bouzid	Heart of Midlothian	PAS Giannina	Free
9 August 2011	Declan Gallagher	Celtic	Clyde	Free
9 August 2011	Josh Thompson	Celtic	Peterborough United	Loan
9 August 2011	Pedro Moutinho	Falkirk	Brașov	Free
9 August 2011	Darren Docherty	Greenock Morton	Largs Thistle	Free
9 August 2011	Jamie Docherty	Greenock Morton	Port Glasgow	Free
9 August 2011	Max Johnson	Inverness Caledonian Thistle	Blyth Spartans	Free
10 August 2011	Bryn Halliwell	Partick Thistle	Sauchie	Free
10 August 2011	Isaiah Osbourne	Aston Villa	Hibernian	Free
10 August 2011	Madjid Bougherra	Rangers	Lekhwiya	£1,700,000
11 August 2011	Phil Airey	Newcastle United	Hibernian	Loan
11 August 2011	Patrick Cregg	St Mirren	Bury	Free
11 August 2011	David Weatherston	Queen of the South	Falkirk	Free
11 August 2011	Scott Pittman	Hamilton Academical	Broxburn Athletic	Free
12 August 2011	Gavin Gunning	Blackburn Rovers	Dundee United	Free
12 August 2011	Jorge Galán	Osasuna	Kilmarnock	Loan
12 August 2011	Dominico Gibson	Aberdeen	East Stirlingshire	Free
12 August 2011	Alistair Worby	Doncaster Rovers	St Johnstone	Free
12 August 2011	Jon Routledge	Hamilton Academical	Stockport County	Free
12 August 2011	Tom Elliott	Hamilton Academical	Stockport County	Free
12 August 2011	Gary Pettigrew	Greenock Morton	East Stirlingshire	Free
12 August 2011	Gary Irons	Dundee	Lochee United	Free
13 August 2011	Mark Buchan	Greenock Morton	Witton Albion	Free
17 August 2011	Alejandro Bedoya	Örebro	Rangers	Undisclosed
17 August 2011	Carlos Bocanegra	Saint-Étienne	Rangers	Undisclosed
17 August 2011	Fraser Forster	Newcastle United	Celtic	Loan
17 August 2011	Leon Panikvar	Zalaegerszegi	Kilmarnock	Free
18 August 2011	Adam McHugh	St Mirren	Forfar Athletic	Loan
18 August 2011	Reece McGillion	Hamilton Academical	Greenock Morton	Free
18 August 2011	Francis Dickoh	Hibernian	Aris	Free
19 August 2011	Roman Golobart	Wigan Athletic	Inverness Caledonian Thistle	Loan
19 August 2011	Ilias Haddad	AZ Alkmaar	St Mirren	Free
19 August 2011	Christie Elliot	Whitley Bay	Partick Thistle	Free
19 August 2011	Shaun Fraser	Partick Thistle	Stenhousemuir	Loan
19 August 2011	Joseph McCafferty	Falkirk	Stenhousemuir	Free
19 August 2011	Jure Travner	St Mirren	Ludogorets	Free
19 August 2011	Scott Ross	Aberdeen	Peterhead	Loan
19 August 2011	James Bloom	Falkirk	Gloucester City	Free
20 August 2011	Mark Durnan	St Johnstone	Stranraer	Loan
22 August 2011	Kevin McCann	Hibernian	Greenock Morton	Free
22 August 2011	Mehdi Khalis	Falkirk	Drancy	Free
23 August 2011	Mohamed Chalali	Panionios	Aberdeen	Free
23 August 2011	Stephen O'Donnell	Celtic	Partick Thistle	Free
23 August 2011	Joe McKee	Burnley	St Mirren	Loan
24 August 2011	Hermann Mboa Mekongo	Racing Club de France	Motherwell	Free
24 August 2011	Lauri Dalla Valle	Fulham	Dundee United	Loan
24 August 2011	Willie Gibson	Crawley Town	St Johnstone	Loan
25 August 2011	Daryl Murphy	Celtic	Ipswich Town	Loan
25 August 2011	Richie Towell	Celtic	Hibernian	Loan
25 August 2011	Matt McKay	Brisbane Roar	Rangers	£450,000
26 August 2011	Tim Clancy	Kilmarnock	Motherwell	Free
26 August 2011	Craig Easton	Southend United	Dunfermline Athletic	Free
26 August 2011	Greig Spence	Celtic	Hamilton Academical	Loan
26 August 2011	David Crawford	Hibernian	Brechin City	Loan
26 August 2011	Darren Dolan	Hamilton Academical	Sauchie	Free
26 August 2011	Scott Smith	Hibernian	Brechin City	Loan
26 August 2011	Andy MacLean	Brunswick City	Hamilton Academical	Free
27 August 2011	Leigh Griffiths	Wolverhampton Wanderers	Hibernian	Loan
28 August 2011	Freddie Ljungberg	Celtic	Shimizu S-Pulse	Free
30 August 2011	Mo Bangura	AIK	Celtic	£2,200,000
30 August 2011	Joe Shaughnessy	Aberdeen	Forfar Athletic	Loan
30 August 2011	Nicky Low	Aberdeen	Forfar Athletic	Loan
30 August 2011	Ross McKinnon	Motherwell	Dumbarton	Loan
30 August 2011	Steven Howarth	Motherwell	Alloa Athletic	Loan
30 August 2011	Keanu Marsh-Brown	Fulham	Dundee United	Loan
31 August 2011	David Davis	Wolverhampton Wanderers	Inverness Caledonian Thistle	Loan
31 August 2011	Ryan Connolly	Derby County	Ayr United	Loan
31 August 2011	Andrew Little	Rangers	Port Vale	Loan
31 August 2011	Aidan Chippendale	Huddersfield Town	Inverness Caledonian Thistle	Loan
31 August 2011	Paul Currie	Berwick Rangers	Hamilton Academical	Undisclosed
31 August 2011	Shaun Maloney	Celtic	Wigan Athletic	£1,000,000
31 August 2011	Badr El Kaddouri	Dynamo Kyiv	Celtic	Loan
31 August 2011	Mohamadou Sissoko	Udinese	Kilmarnock	Loan
31 August 2011	Jude Winchester	Linfield	Kilmarnock	Free
31 August 2011	Jonathan Stynes	ECU Joondalup	Kilmarnock	Free
31 August 2011	Callum Tapping	Tottenham Hotspur	Heart of Midlothian	Undisclosed
31 August 2011	Jos Hooiveld	Celtic	Southampton	Loan
31 August 2011	Paul McQuade	St Mirren	East Fife	Free
31 August 2011	Dominic Kennedy	St Mirren	Dumbarton	Loan
31 August 2011	Adam Mitter	Blackpool	Hibernian	Free
31 August 2011	Michael Paton	Aberdeen	Stockport County	Loan
31 August 2011	Garry Wood	Ross County	Peterhead	Loan
31 August 2011	Kal Naismith	Rangers	Cowdenbeath	Loan
31 August 2011	Collin Samuel	St Johnstone	Luton Town	Free
31 August 2011	Valdas Trakys	Hibernian	Anagennisi Epanomi	Free

== See also ==
- List of Scottish football transfers 2010–11
- List of Scottish football transfers winter 2011–12
