= 2011–12 Greenock Morton F.C. season =

Greenock Morton
2011–12 season
- Chairman: Douglas Rae
- Manager: Allan Moore
- Scottish First Division: 8th
- Scottish Cup: Fifth round (eliminated by Motherwell)
- League Cup: Second round (eliminated by St Mirren)
- Challenge Cup: Quarter-final (eliminated by Hamilton Academical)
- Top goalscorer: League: Peter MacDonald (10); All: Peter MacDonald (15)
- Highest home attendance: League: 2,621 (v Falkirk); Cup: 4,959 (v St Mirren)
- Lowest home attendance: League: 1,306 (v Ross County); Cup: 1,406 (v Deveronvale)
- Average home league attendance: 1,814
Home colours	Away colours	Third colours

Season 2011–12 sees Greenock Morton compete in their fifth consecutive season in the First Division, having finished 7th in the 2010–11 season.

== Story of the season ==
=== May ===
Top league goal scorer Allan Jenkins rejected a new deal at the club, and will join a new club on 15 May. It turned out that he was offered more money to go to Northern Ireland and sign for part-timers Ballymena United.

Brian Graham, Ryan Kane and Nathan Shepherd were all released.

Grant Evans signed a one-year permanent deal after his loan deal expired.

Ross Forsyth became Morton's second signing of the season, coming in on a free transfer from Stirling Albion, on a part-time basis.

Allan Moore confirmed pre-contract agreements with another two ex-Stirling players in Paul di Giacomo and Andy Graham, they completed the deals in June 2011.

Carlo Monti turned down a new contract offer with the club.

A slight variation on the strip sponsor was announced for the new season, with Golden Casket maintaining their place as sponsors, but replacing the Millions brand with Ferguson's Chocolate.

Kevin Kelbie was allowed to leave six months early to join Jenkins in Northern Ireland, signing for Glenavon.

=== June ===
Morton sign St Johnstone striker Andy Jackson on a free transfer, with Queen of the South midfielder Stephen McKenna expected to sign shortly. McKenna however rejected a move to Cappielow, preferring to stay at the Doonhamers.

Fouad Bachirou signed a new one-year deal, and loanee from last season Sean Fitzharris returned to the club after being released by Celtic.

Morton hired renowned sports scientist Graeme Jones, to improve the squad's fitness over the pre-season program.

A few unattached players took part in the first day of pre-season training, including Archie Campbell, Peter MacDonald and Darren McGeouch (who previously played for the club). Gavin Skelton was also spoken to regarding a possible move to Cappielow, and came into the training ground for a trial. Skelton signed for English non-league side Barrow after being offered a bumper contract; a major coup for the Bluebirds.

Trialists McGeouch and MacDonald scored in closed doors games against Airdrie United and Hibernian respectively.

=== July ===
Morton sign two youngsters, Creag Little and Conor Ramsay, from rivals St Mirren on free transfers.

Three more trialists signed up on one-year deals, Darren McGeouch, Peter MacDonald and Archie Campbell.

Morton lost 3–2 at home to Motherwell, with the afore-mentioned players all taking part, as well as trialists Josh Knight (Port Talbot Town) and Florian Verplanck (Beauvais).

Morton lost in the Renfrewshire Cup final for the sixth season in succession. This time, a 4–2 defeat with Peter Weatherson scoring two late consolations.

Morton recovered from this derby defeat by hammering Stranraer 8–0 in the Challenge Cup first round, and defeating Alloa Athletic in the League Cup.

=== August ===
Morton were drawn against rivals St Mirren in the League Cup, the first competitive meeting between the pair since in the Challenge Cup in 2005. Saints won the match 3–4, coming back from a 2–1 deficit at the break.

Ayr United agreed a deal to play their Challenge Cup tie against Raith Rovers at Cappielow.

Morton signed Reece McGillion from Hamilton Accies (for the U19 side). The youngster had previously featured Sky1 TV show Football's Next Star where he finished 7th.

Kevin McCann signed on a short-term deal from Hibs.

=== September ===
Allan Moore received the Manager of the Month award for August, for taking the side to second place, tied on points with league favourites Hamilton Accies.

Morton defeated Ayr United to go top of the First Division.

Matthew McGinley was signed as a back-up to Colin Stewart, from junior side Rutherglen Glencairn.

On 24 September, captain Stuart McCaffrey tore his left plantar fascia in a match against Falkirk. This after months of treatment, eventually ruled him out for the entire season.

=== October ===
Youth director John Laird resigned from the club, citing "family reasons and additional business interests".

With a lack of fit midfielders available to him, Allan Moore attempted to bring in Derek Young as cover until January, awaiting international clearance from the Icelandic FA.

Morton were drawn at home to conquerors of Berwick Rangers, Highland Football League side Deveronvale in the third round of the Scottish Cup. The tie to be played on 19 November 2011 at Cappielow.

=== November ===
Moore completed the signing of Derek Young, and added the loan signing of Dominic Cervi from Celtic, after chairman Douglas Rae put up the additional funds to cover their wages.

Morton's groundsman, Mark Farrell, was named as having the best pitch in the First Division by the Institute of Groundsmanship.

Deveronvale were dispatched 5–1 as Morton moved into the Fourth Round of the Scottish Cup. Morton were drawn away to Raith Rovers in the fourth round.

=== December ===
Morton took former Spain U21 Jorge Larena and current Finland U21 international Tuomas Rannankari on trial. Larena eventually signed for Huesca.

Moore confirmed that Dominic Cervi would return to Celtic in January, and that it would be difficult to bring in Rannankari as he was still contracted to Twente.

=== January ===
Derek Young was offered a new contract, but Dominic Cervi returned to Celtic after his loan spell and Kevin McCann was allowed to leave after his contract expired.

Graham Gartland was rumoured to be in signing talks with the club, from St Johnstone. This was repudiated by the club, as they announced that Young had signed his contract extension. Gartland in the end signed for Shamrock Rovers back in his hometown of Dublin.

Morton traversed the challenge of Raith Rovers in Kirkcaldy to progress to the Fifth Round of the Scottish Cup with a comeback to win 2–1. After the draw for the next round was made by André Villas-Boas and Marcello Lippi, Morton were drawn away to Motherwell in the Fifth Round. Prices were confirmed as being £15 for adults, the same as a First Division game at Cappielow, so a considerable discount from Motherwell's usual SPL prices.

Tied top scorer (with 12 goals at the time) Andy Jackson suffered a hairline fracture to his jaw, ruling him out for four to six weeks.

Morton legend Warren Hawke returned to the club to oversee the youth development at their youth academy.

After the news that McCaffrey's season was over Michael Tidser was named as the team captain at the age of 22.

Towards the end of the transfer window, Sean Fitzharris was released from the club.

Thomas O'Ware suffered a stress fracture to his tibia, ruling him out for at least a month.

=== February ===
Morton were trounced 6–0 by Motherwell to eliminate them from the Scottish Cup.

=== March ===
Derek Anderson was appointed as director of Morton's youth academy.

Morton signed Scotland B international Alan Combe to replace Colin Stewart.

Jonatan Johansson became the new youth coach to work under Derek Anderson and Warren Hawke.

Iain Flannigan signed until the end of the season; plus Creag Little and Alistair Deans were loaned out to junior clubs.

=== April ===
Stuart McCaffrey announced that due to his injury he would be taking time out from football, but not announcing his retirement at this stage.

Morton found out that their opponents in the semi-final of the Renfrewshire Cup would be Gourock Thistle, to be play on 2 May 2012.

Despite only signing a few weeks earlier, Iain Flannigan broke his arm and would miss the remainder of the season.

=== May ===
Paul di Giacomo confirmed that he would be leaving the club at the end of the season to find a job and turn part-time.

Morton defeated Gourock Thistle in their Renfrewshire Cup semi-final by three goals to one; goals came from U17 midfielder Alan Frizzell, a header by young striker Lewis Hawke and a free kick by Peter Weatherson.

Morton finished the season in the 8th position, after a 3–1 home defeat to Raith Rovers.

== First team transfers ==
- From end of 2009–10 season, to last match of season 2010–11
  - Including unsigned trialists who appeared in first team matchday squads

=== In ===
Player	From	League	Fee
(Scotland) Grant Evans	Hamilton Academical	Scottish Football League First Division	Free
(Scotland) Ross Forsyth	Stirling Albion	Scottish Football League Second Division	Free
(Scotland) Paul di Giacomo	Ross County	Scottish Football League First Division	Free
(Scotland) Andy Graham	Hamilton Academical	Scottish Football League First Division	Free
(Republic of Ireland) Andy Jackson	St Johnstone	Scottish Premier League	Free
(Scotland) Sean Fitzharris	Celtic	Scottish Premier League	Free
(Scotland) Creag Little	St Mirren	Scottish Premier League	Free
(Scotland) Conor Ramsay	St Mirren	Scottish Premier League	Free
(Scotland) Peter MacDonald	St Johnstone	Scottish Premier League	Free
(Scotland) Archie Campbell	Rangers	Scottish Premier League	Free
(Scotland) Darren McGeouch	Falkirk Amateurs	Stirling & District League	Free
(Scotland) Bryan Hodge	Partick Thistle	Scottish Football League First Division	Trial
(Scotland) Reece McGillion	Hamilton Academical	Scottish Football League First Division	Free
(Scotland) Kevin McCann	Hibernian	Scottish Premier League	Free
(Scotland) Matthew McGinley	Rutherglen Glencairn	Scottish Junior Football West Division One	Free
(United States) Dominic Cervi	Celtic	Scottish Premier League	Loan
(Scotland) Derek Young	(Iceland) Grindavík	Úrvalsdeild	Free
(Scotland) Alan Combe	Free agent	N / A	Free
(Scotland) Iain Flannigan	Partick Thistle	Scottish Football League First Division	Free

=== Out ===
Player	To	League	Fee
(Scotland) Kevin McKinlay	Stenhousemuir	Scottish Football League Second Division	Free
(Scotland) David MacGregor	Stranraer	Scottish Football League Third Division	Free
(Scotland) Graeme Holmes	Alloa Athletic	Scottish Football League Third Division	Free
(Scotland) Kevin Cuthbert	Ayr United	Scottish Football League First Division	Free
(Scotland) Stewart Kean	Stenhousemuir	Scottish Football League Second Division	Free
(Scotland) Darren Young	Alloa Athletic	Scottish Football League Third Division	Free
(Scotland) Derek Lyle	Hamilton Academical	Scottish Football League First Division	Free
(Scotland) Allan Jenkins	(Northern Ireland) Ballymena United	IFA Premiership	Free
(Scotland) Nathan Shepherd	Stranraer	Scottish Football League Third Division	Free
(Scotland) Ryan Kane	Clyde	Scottish Football League Third Division	Free
(Scotland) Brian Graham	Raith Rovers	Scottish Football League First Division	Free
(Scotland) Carlo Monti	Kings Parks Rangers	SAFL Premier Division 1	Free
(Scotland) Kevin Kelbie	(Northern Ireland) Glenavon	IFA Premiership	Free
(Scotland) Darren Docherty	Largs Thistle	Scottish Junior Football West Premier League	Free
(Scotland) Jamie Docherty	Port Glasgow	Scottish Junior Football Central Division One	Free
(Scotland) Mark Buchan	(England) Witton Albion	Northern Premier League Division One North	Free
(Scotland) Gary Pettigrew	East Stirlingshire	Scottish Football League Third Division	Free
(Scotland) Bryan Hodge	Brechin City	Scottish Football League Second Division	Free
(Scotland) Kevin McCann	Livingston	Scottish Football League First Division	Free
(Scotland) Sean Fitzharris	Clyde	Scottish Football League Third Division	Free
(Scotland) Creag Little	Largs Thistle	Scottish Junior Football West Premier League	Loan
(Scotland) Alistair Deans	Port Glasgow	Scottish Junior Football Central Division One	Loan

== Squad (that played for first team) ==
Note: Flags indicate national team as defined under FIFA eligibility rules; some limited exceptions apply. Players may hold more than one non-FIFA nationality.

No.	Pos.	Nation	Player
—	GK	(United States) USA	Dominic Cervi (on loan from Celtic (November–January))
—	GK	(Scotland) SCO	Alan Combe (signed in March)
—	GK	(Scotland) SCO	Alistair Deans (loaned to Port Glasgow (March-end of season))
—	GK	(Scotland) SCO	Matthew McGinley
—	GK	(Scotland) SCO	Colin Stewart
—	DF	(Scotland) SCO	Grant Evans
—	DF	(Scotland) SCO	Ross Forsyth
—	DF	(Scotland) SCO	Andy Graham
—	DF	(Scotland) SCO	Creag Little (loaned to Largs Thistle (March-end of season))
—	DF	(Scotland) SCO	Stuart McCaffrey
—	DF	(Scotland) SCO	Kevin McCann (released in January)
—	DF	(Scotland) SCO	Thomas O'Ware
—	DF	(Northern Ireland) NIR	Marc Smyth
—	MF	(France) FRA	Fouad Bachirou

No.	Pos.	Nation	Player
—	MF	(Scotland) SCO	Sean Fitzharris (released in January)
—	MF	(Scotland) SCO	Alan Frizzell
—	MF	(Scotland) SCO	Iain Flannigan (trialist, then signed in March)
—	MF	(Scotland) SCO	Darren McGeouch
—	MF	(Scotland) SCO	David O'Brien
—	MF	(Scotland) SCO	Conor Ramsay
—	MF	(Scotland) SCO	Michael Tidser
—	MF	(Scotland) SCO	Derek Young
—	FW	(Scotland) SCO	Archie Campbell
—	FW	(Scotland) SCO	Paul di Giacomo
—	FW	(Scotland) SCO	Lewis Hawke
—	FW	(Republic of Ireland) IRL	Andy Jackson
—	FW	(Democratic Republic of the Congo) COD	Joel Kasubandi
—	FW	(Scotland) SCO	Peter MacDonald
—	FW	(England) ENG	Peter Weatherson

== Fixtures and results ==
Win Draw Loss Upcoming fixture

=== Friendlies ===
Date	Opponents	Stadium	Result F – A	Scorers	Attendance
30 June 2011	Hibernian	Tranent, Edinburgh	2–5	Peter MacDonald	Closed door
30 June 2011	Airdrie United	Tranent, Edinburgh	1–4	Darren McGeouch	Closed door
5 July 2011	Motherwell	Cappielow Park, Greenock	2–3	Andy Graham; Andy Jackson	669
13 July 2011	(England) Walsall	Cappielow Park, Greenock	0–2		608
16 July 2011	St Mirren (Renfrewshire Cup Final)	St Mirren Park, Paisley	2–4	Peter Weatherson	TBC
16 July 2011	Largs Thistle	Barrfields Park, Largs	0–2		TBC
19 July 2011	Queen's Park	Hampden Park, Glasgow	1–0	Archie Campbell	Closed door
27 September 2011	Motherwell	Dalziel Park, Motherwell	2–4	Archie Campbell	Public park
25 October 2011	Motherwell	National Centre Inverclyde, Largs	2–1	Archie Campbell; TBC	Public Park
14 December 2011	Kilmarnock	TBC	2–0	Paul di Giacomo; Andy Graham	Closed door
20 December 2011	Celtic	Lennoxtown training centre, Glasgow	1–3	David O'Brien	Closed door
2 May 2012	Gourock Thistle (Renfrewshire Cup semi-final)	Cappielow Park, Greenock	3–1	Alan Frizzell; Lewis Hawke; Peter Weatherson	217

=== Scottish Football League First Division ===
- If in bold, Morton were top of the league after this game.
  - Links to BBC match reports next to scores. Alternatives given if BBC report not available.

Date	Opponents	Stadium	Result F – A	Events	Attendance	Points	Referee
6 August 2011	Ross County	Victoria Park, Dingwall	0–0	Ross Forsyth (yellow card) 74'	2,249	1	Steven McLean
13 August 2011	Livingston	Cappielow Park, Greenock	2–1	Michael Tidser 9'; Kevin McCann (yellow card) 27'; Peter MacDonald 64' (pen.); Stuart McCaffrey (yellow card) 73' (yellow card) 87' (red card)	2,025	4	Brian Winter
20 August 2011	Raith Rovers	Stark's Park, Kirkcaldy	1–1	Paul di Giacomo 38'; Peter MacDonald (yellow card) 80'	2,109	5	Charlie Richmond
27 August 2011	Dundee	Dens Park, Dundee	1–0	Peter MacDonald 7'; Ross Forsyth (yellow card) 17'; Marc Smyth (yellow card) 42'	4,096	8	Frank McDermott
**10 September 2011**	**Ayr United**	**Cappielow Park, Greenock**	**4 – 1**	**Peter MacDonald 10', 13'**; **Andy Jackson 11'**; **Peter Weatherson 89' (pen.)**	**2,018**	**11**	**Steve Conroy**
**17 September 2011**	**Queen of the South**	**Palmerston Park, Dumfries**	**1 – 4**	**Peter MacDonald 87'**; **Grant Evans (yellow card) 90'**	**1,699**	**11**	**George Salmond**
**24 September 2011**	**Falkirk**	**Cappielow Park, Greenock**	**3 – 2**	**Peter MacDonald 6', 54' (pen.) (yellow card) 41'**; **Marc Smyth (yellow card) 45'**; **Ross Forsyth (yellow card) 49'**; **Andy Jackson 58'**	**2,621**	**14**	**Crawford Allan**
**30 September 2011**	**Partick Thistle**	**Firhill Stadium, Maryhill, Glasgow**	**0 – 5**	**Ross Forsyth (yellow card) 26'**; **Andy Graham (red card) 74'**	**3,380**	**14**	**Craig Charleston**
15 October 2011	Hamilton Academical	Cappielow Park, Greenock	0–2	Marc Smyth (yellow card) 63'	2,264	14	George Salmond
22 October 2011	Livingston	The Braidwood Motor Company Stadium, Livingston	1–1	David O'Brien 16'; Grant Evans (yellow card) 18'; Matthew McGinley (yellow card) 33'	1,740	15	Kevin Clancy
29 October 2011	Ross County	Cappielow Park, Greenock	0–2	Fouad Bachirou (yellow card) 74'	1,748	15	Charlie Richmond
5 November 2011	Ayr United	Somerset Park, Ayr	1–0	David O'Brien 23'; Peter MacDonald (yellow card) 26'; Kevin McCann (yellow card) 62'	1,570	18	Mike Tumilty
12 November 2011	Dundee	Cappielow Park, Greenock	1–2	Andy Jackson 5'; Grant Evans (yellow card) 86'	2,201	18	Stevie O'Reilly
26 November 2011	Queen of the South	Cappielow Park, Greenock	2–2	Andy Jackson 17'; Peter Weatherson 82'	1,352	19	Willie Collum
3 December 2011	Falkirk	Falkirk Stadium, Grangemouth	0–1		3,114	19	Iain Brines
10 December 2011	Partick Thistle	Cappielow Park, Greenock	1–2	Darren McGeouch 53'; David O'Brien (yellow card) 82'	1,849	19	John McKendrick
26 December 2011	Dundee	Dens Park, Dundee	1–0	Andy Jackson 22'; Thomas O'Ware (yellow card) 50'; Peter MacDonald (yellow card) 78'	5,862	22	John Beaton
2 January 2012	Ayr United	Cappielow Park, Greenock	3–1	Andy Graham (yellow card) 20'; David O'Brien 44'; Archie Campbell 64'; Darren McGeouch (yellow card) 85'; Paul Di Giacomo 89'	2, 108	25	Stevie O'Reilly
14 January 2012	Raith Rovers	Cappielow Park, Greenock	1–1	David O'Brien (yellow card) 61' (goal) 65'; Thomas O'Ware (yellow card) 62'	1,739	26	Kevin Clancy
28 January 2012	Queen of the South	Palmerston Park, Dumfries	1–2	David O'Brien (yellow card) 35'; Creag Little (yellow card) 52'; Archie Campbell 75'; Grant Evans (yellow card) 89'	1,444	26	Craig Charleston
11 February 2012	Falkirk	Cappielow Park, Greenock	0–0	Michael Tidser (yellow card); Grant Evans (yellow card) 83'	1,756	27	Bobby Madden
14 February 2012	Hamilton Academical	New Douglas Park, Hamilton	2–1	Archie Campbell 24'; David O'Brien 29'; Thomas O'Ware (yellow card) 54'	1,356	30	Steve Conroy
18 February 2012	Partick Thistle	Firhill Stadium, Maryhill, Glasgow	0–0	Archie Campbell (yellow card) 35'; Fouad Bachirou (yellow card) 79'	2,305	31	Crawford Allan
25 February 2012	Hamilton Academical	Cappielow Park, Greenock	1–2	Ross Forsyth (yellow card) 65'; David O'Brien 85'	1,594	31	John Beaton
3 March 2012	Raith Rovers	Stark's Park, Kirkcaldy	0–5	Peter Weatherson (yellow card) 90'	1,480	31	George Salmond
10 March 2012	Livingston	Cappielow Park, Greenock	1–3	Marc Smyth (yellow card) 21'; Peter MacDonald 22'; Derek Young (yellow card) 69'	1,396	31	Charlie Richmond
13 March 2012	Ross County	Victoria Park, Dingwall	2–2	Fouad Bachirou (yellow card) 34'; Iain Flannigan (yellow card) 57'; Peter Weatherson (yellow card) 75' (goal) 90' (pen.); Archie Campbell 87' (yellow card) 90'	2,325	32	Craig Charleston
17 March 2012	Dundee	Cappielow Park, Greenock	0–2	Peter Weatherson (red card) 64'; Marc Smyth (yellow card) 90'	1,610	32	Stephen Finnie
20 March 2012	Falkirk	Falkirk Stadium, Grangemouth	2–0	Ross Forsyth (yellow card) 50'; Michael Tidser 56'; Archie Campbell 82'	2,538	35	Euan Norris
24 March 2012	Ayr United	Somerset Park, Ayr	0–0	Marc Smyth (yellow card) 20'; Grant Evans (yellow card) 23'; Derek Young (yellow card) 67'	1,669	36	Iain Brines
7 April 2012	Queen of the South	Cappielow Park, Greenock	2–2	Fouad Bachirou 32'; Michael Tidser (yellow card) 42'; Peter MacDonald 62'	1,622	37	Crawford Allan
10 April 2012	Partick Thistle	Cappielow Park, Greenock	1–0	Peter MacDonald 8'; Derek Young (yellow card) 84'	1,637	40	Steven McLean
14 April 2012	Hamilton Academical	New Douglas Park, Hamilton	3–4	Andy Graham (yellow card) 32'; Ross Forsyth (yellow card) 58'; Fouad Bachirou (yellow card) 62'; Simon Mensing 78' (OG); Darren McGeouch 84'; Derek Young 89'	1,423	40	David Somers
21 April 2012	Ross County	Cappielow Park, Greenock	1–1	Marc Smyth 41'	1,306	41	Brian Winter
28 April 2012	Livingston	The Braidwood Motor Company Stadium, Livingston	0–0	Andy Graham (yellow card) 18'; Michael Tidser (yellow card) 75'	1,571	42	Des Roache
5 May 2012	Raith Rovers	Cappielow Park, Greenock	1–3	Peter Weatherson (yellow card) 31'; Lewis Hawke 77'	1,814	42	Kevin Clancy

=== Scottish Cup ===
Date	Round	Opponents	Stadium	Result F – A	Events	Attendance	Referee
19 November 2011	Round 3	Deveronvale	Cappielow Park, Greenock	5–1	David O'Brien 15' (yellow card) 34'; Peter MacDonald 21'; Andy Jackson 38'; Peter Weatherson 72'; Archie Campbell 74'	1,406	Gary Hilland
7 January 2012	Round 4	Raith Rovers	Stark's Park, Kirkcaldy	2–1	Marc Smyth (yellow card) 4'; Archie Campbell 67'; Peter MacDonald 76' (pen.)	1,581	Steven McLean
4 February 2012	Round 5	Motherwell	Fir Park, Motherwell	0–6	Grant Evans (yellow card) 39'; Derek Young (yellow card) 47'	5,139	Euan Norris

=== Scottish League Cup ===
Date	Round	Opponents	Stadium	Result F – A	Events	Attendance	Referee
30 July 2011	Round 1	Alloa Athletic	Recreation Park, Alloa	3–0	Paul di Giacomo 29'; Ross Forsyth (yellow card) 64'; Andy Jackson 67'; Peter Weatherson 90+2'	683	Stephen Finnie
23 August 2011	Round 2	St Mirren	Cappielow Park, Greenock	3–4	Michael Tidser 17'; Peter MacDonald 27'; Andy Jackson 79'; Peter Weatherson (yellow card) 90'	4,959	Calum Murray

=== Challenge Cup ===
Date	Round	Opponents	Stadium	Result F – A	Events	Attendance	Referee
23 July 2011	Round 1	Stranraer	Stair Park, Stranraer	8–0	Andy Jackson 19', 42', 77', 86'; Paul di Giacomo 53', 54', 64', 69'	374	John McKendrick
9 August 2011	Round 2	Forfar Athletic	Station Park, Forfar	5–0	Peter MacDonald (yellow card) 39' (goal) 61', 75'; David O'Brien 56'; Peter Weatherson 59'; Archie Campbell 78'	448	Matt Northcroft
4 September 2011	Quarter final	Hamilton Academical	New Douglas Park, Hamilton	1–2	Paul di Giacomo 10'; Ross Forsyth (yellow card) 66'; Grant Evans (yellow card) 76'	1,496	Stevie O'Reilly

== League table ==
Pos	Team	Pld	W	D	L	GF	GA	GD	Pts	Promotion, qualification or relegation
6	Partick Thistle	36	12	11	13	50	39	+11	47	
7	Raith Rovers	36	11	11	14	46	49	−3	44	
8	Greenock Morton	36	10	12	14	40	55	−15	42	
9	Ayr United (R)	36	9	11	16	44	67	−23	38	Qualification for the First Division play-offs
10	Queen of the South (R)	36	7	11	18	38	64	−26	32	Relegation to the Second Division

Source: SPFL Archive
Rules for classification: 1) points; 2) goal difference; 3) number of goals scored.
(R) Relegated

== Player statistics ==
As of 6 May 2012

=== All competitions ===
- Additional positions played listed, if have started in more than one this season, after most played position.

Position	Player	Starts	Subs	Unused subs	Goals	Red cards (red card)	Yellow cards (yellow card)
MF	(France) Fouad Bachirou	33	3	1	1	0	4
FW / MF	(Scotland) Archie Campbell	18	21	2	8	0	2
GK	(United States) Dominic Cervi (on loan from Celtic)	7	0	0	0	0	0
GK	(Scotland) Alan Combe	10	0	0	0	0	0
GK	(Scotland) Alistair Deans (U19)	1	0	14	0	0	0
MF	(Scotland) Paul di Giacomo	21	10	3	8	0	0
DF	(Scotland) Grant Evans	38	2	1	0	0	8
MF	(Scotland) Sean Fitzharris	3	7	2	0	0	0
MF	(Scotland) Iain Flannigan	3	1	1	0	0	1
DF	(Scotland) Ross Forsyth	31	0	0	0	0	9
MF	(Scotland) Aidan Fulton (U19)	0	0	3	0	0	0
MF	(Scotland) Alan Frizzell (U17)	0	1	0	0	0	0
DF	(Scotland) Andy Graham	28	2	2	0	1	2
FW	(Scotland) Lewis Hawke (U19)	0	2	2	1	0	0
DF	(Scotland) Bryan Hodge (trialist)	0	0	2	0	0	0
FW	(Republic of Ireland) Andy Jackson	25	11	5	12	0	0
FW	(Democratic Republic of the Congo) Joel Kasubandi (U19)	0	2	4	0	0	0
GK	(Scotland) Shahrukh Khatri (U19)	0	0	1	0	0	0
DF	(Scotland) Creag Little (U19)	2	1	10	0	0	1
FW	(Scotland) Peter MacDonald	37	6	0	15	0	5
DF	(Scotland) Stuart McCaffrey	10	0	0	0	1	1
DF / MF	(Scotland) Kevin McCann	13	1	1	0	0	2
MF	(Scotland) Darren McGeouch	18	16	8	2	0	1
GK	(Scotland) Matthew McGinley	2	0	23	0	0	1
MF	(Scotland) David O'Brien	40	0	0	8	0	4
DF	(Scotland) Thomas O'Ware (U19)	15	1	6	0	0	3
DF	(Scotland) Martin Orr (U19)	0	0	1	0	0	0
MF	(Scotland) Conor Ramsay (U19)	0	1	2	0	0	0
DF / MF	(Northern Ireland) Marc Smyth	35	0	2	1	0	7
GK	(Scotland) Colin Stewart	24	0	5	0	0	0
MF	(Scotland) Michael Tidser	29	3	0	3	0	2
DF / FW	(England) Peter Weatherson	20	18	4	6	1	4
MF / DF	(Scotland) Derek Young	20	2	2	1	0	4

=== Awards ===
Last updated 21 December 2011

Nation	Name	Award	Month
(Scotland)	Allan Moore	First Division Manager of the Month	August
(Scotland)	Peter MacDonald	Ginger Boot Winner	September
