= Alan Frizzell =

Scottish footballer

Personal information
- Date of birth: 14 April 1995 (age 31)
- Place of birth: Greenock, Scotland
- Position: Forward

Team information
- Current team: Greenock Juniors

Youth career
- c.2006–2012: Greenock Morton

Senior career*
Years	Team	Apps	(Gls)
2012–2013	Greenock Morton	1	(0)
2013	→ Port Glasgow (loan)	3	(0)
2013	Port Glasgow	23	(10)
2013–2014	Dumbarton	0	(0)
2014–2016	Largs Thistle	62	(11)
2016–2017	Clydebank	19	(5)
2017–2019	Neilston Juniors	?	(?)
2019–2020	Greenock Juniors	?	(?)
2020	Kilbirnie Ladeside	0	(0)
2020	Benburb	1	(0)
2020-2021	Troon	1	(0)
2021	Broomhill	8	(1)
2021-	Kilbirnie Ladeside		
- * Club domestic league appearances and goals as of 08:00, 12 November 2021 (UTC)

Alan Alexander Frizzell (born 14 April 1995 in Greenock) is a Scottish footballer playing with WoSFL Premiership side Kilbirnie Ladeside.

He started his career with local side Greenock Morton, before turning Junior with Port Glasgow. He then had spells with Dumbarton, Largs Thistle, Clydebank, Neilston Juniors, Greenock Juniors, and Broomhill.

== Career ==
Frizzell made his senior debut for Morton at the age of 17, as a substitute against Raith Rovers on 5 May 2012. This was an immediate step-up from the U17 side, as he had never played for the club at U19 level. He had scored in the Renfrewshire Cup against Gourock Thistle in the previous midweek match.

Already with a career outside of football, Frizzell did not to go full-time with Morton, instead moving to a local Junior club Port Glasgow. He spent a season at the Port, before returning to senior football when Ian Murray signed him for Scottish Championship side Dumbarton.

Frizzell left Dumbarton in 2014 to sign for Largs Thistle; leaving the club two years later to sign for Neilston Juniors.

After two seasons at Brig O'Lea, Frizzell joined his home town club Greenock Juniors.

Frizzell moved to Kilbirnie Ladeside in June 2020 but was released after the club decided to take a season out due to the current COVID-19 pandemic and signed for Benburb F.C. After only one match, Benburb also chose to take a season out and he joined Troon.

Frizell has since re-joined Greenock Juniors.

== Personal life ==
Frizzell is the older brother of Airdrieonians winger Adam Frizzell.

Frizzell pleaded guilty to failing to comply when asked to take a breath test on 29th of March 2026. Police suspected he had been in charge of a car while under the influence of drink or drugs. When police officers found Frizzell, they saw vomit on the inside of the seat and on the ground outside and noted a smell of alcohol from him. Frizzell had five points on his licence at the time of sentencing. He was fined £625 and had four penalty points during his court appearance at Greenock Sheriff Court on 21st of September 2026.

== See also ==
- Greenock Morton F.C. season 2011–12
