= Darren McGeouch =

Scottish footballer

Personal information
- Date of birth: 28 February 1990 (age 36)
- Place of birth: Glasgow, Scotland
- Height: 1.73 m (5 ft 8 in)
- Position: Central midfielder

Youth career
- Celtic

Senior career*
Years	Team	Apps	(Gls)
2007–2009	Greenock Morton	0	(0)
2009–2010	Stranraer	18	(1)
2011	Stranraer	0	(0)
2011	Falkirk Amateurs	?	(?)
2011–2012	Greenock Morton	26	(2)
2013	Glasgow Perthshire	?	(?)
2013–2015	Irvine Meadow	?	(?)
- * Club domestic league appearances and goals as of 15:00, 22 February 2013(UTC)

Darren McGeouch (born 28 February 1990) is a Scottish footballer who plays as a midfielder.

== Career ==
McGeouch started his career in Celtic's youth team before signing for Greenock Morton in 2007, choosing the Greenock side over rivals St Mirren and Kilmarnock. He stayed at the club for two seasons, making no appearances before signing with Stranraer. On 7 November 2009, McGeouch scored his first goal in senior football in a 4–2 defeat for Stranraer by English side Berwick Rangers.

McGeouch had two spells with Stranraer, the last of which ended in March 2011 when he signed for an amateur side in Falkirk. In between these two spells at Stair Park, McGeouch was not with a club due to a change in personal circumstances, but did play in a few trial matches with his local Junior club Glasgow Perthshire, and for his college side.

In the summer of 2011, his first senior club Morton re-signed the now 21-year-old midfielder.

McGeouch made his début as a second-half substitute (for Peter MacDonald) in the 8-0 Challenge Cup victory over his former side Stranraer. He was released for a second time in May 2012.

McGeouch joined Glasgow Perthshire in February 2013 before moving to Irvine Meadow the following July.

His brother, Dylan McGeouch, is also a professional footballer.

== See also ==
2011–12 Greenock Morton F.C. season
