= Conor Ramsay =

Scottish footballer

Personal information
- Date of birth: 9 March 1993 (age 33)
- Place of birth: Paisley, Scotland
- Position: Midfielder

Team information
- Current team: Arthurlie

Senior career*
Years	Team	Apps	(Gls)
2009–2011	St Mirren	5	(0)
2011–2012	Greenock Morton	1	(0)
2012–2013	Johnstone Burgh		
2013–	Arthurlie		

International career
2008	Scotland U16	4	(5)
2008–2009	Scotland U17	10	(0)
- * Club domestic league appearances and goals as of 20:30, 6 July 2013 (UTC)

Conor Ramsay (born 9 March 1993) is a Scottish professional footballer who plays for Arthurlie in the Scottish Junior Football Association, West Region. He is a former Scotland youth international and has previously played in the Scottish Premier League for St Mirren.

== Career ==
A midfielder, Ramsay started his career with hometown team St Mirren. He made five appearances in the Scottish Premier League under the management of Gus MacPherson at the age of sixteen while also featuring for the Scotland U17 international team. Injury restricted his progress at St Mirren and Ramsay moved to rivals Greenock Morton in July 2011.

After his release by Morton in May 2012, Ramsay joined Junior side Johnstone Burgh before moving on to Arthurlie in July 2013.

He is now involved with former club St Mirren as a community development officer.

== Career statistics ==
As of 14 April 2012

Appearances and goals by club, season and competition
Club	Season	League		FA Cup		League Cup		Other		Total	
Club	Season	Apps	Goals	Apps	Goals	Apps	Goals	Apps	Goals	Apps	Goals
St Mirren	2009–10	5	0	0	0	0	0	0	0	5	0
St Mirren	2010–11	0	0	0	0	0	0	0	0	0	0
Greenock Morton	2011–12	1	0	0	0	0	0	0	0	1	0
Career total		6	0	0	0	0	0	0	0	6	0
