= Matthew McGinley =

Scottish footballer

Personal information
- Date of birth: 15 August 1989 (age 37)
- Place of birth: Glasgow, Scotland
- Position: Goalkeeper

Team information
- Current team: Rutherglen Glencairn

Senior career*
Years	Team	Apps	(Gls)
–2011	Vale of Clyde		
2011	Rutherglen Glencairn	2	(0)
2011–2012	Greenock Morton	2	(0)
2012–2014	Albion Rovers	27	(0)
2014–2015	BSC Glasgow		
2015–2021	East Kilbride		
2021–	Rutherglen Glencairn		
- * Club domestic league appearances and goals as of 2 June 2021

Matthew McGinley (born 15 August 1989) is a Scottish professional footballer, who plays as a goalkeeper for Rutherglen Glencairn.

He started his senior career with Scottish First Division side Greenock Morton, after playing junior football.

== Career ==
McGinley moved to Greenock Morton on 14 September 2011 from Lanarkshire junior side Rutherglen Glencairn, where he had only been signed since July 2011 from Vale of Clyde.

He made his début for Morton at Almondvale Stadium, against Livingston. McGinley fouled Marc McNulty to concede a penalty, which was converted by Iain Russell, in a 1-1 draw.

McGinley was released by Morton in May 2012.

He signed for Albion Rovers after his release from Morton. After leaving Rovers, McGinley signed for the newly formed Lowland Football League side BSC Glasgow. After leaving BSC Glasgow, McGinley signed for Lowland Football League side East Kilbride. He most notably played in the 2-0 defeat to Scottish Premiership side and leaders Celtic in their Scottish Cup 5th round tie in 2016.

McGinley left East Kilbride in May 2021 and re-joined Rutherglen Glencairn on 2 June 2021.

== Honours ==
BSC Glasgow

- SFA South Region Challenge Cup: 2014-15

East Kilbride

- Lowland Football League: 2016-17; 2018-19
- SFA South Region Challenge Cup: 2016–17, 2018-19
- Lowland League Cup: 2015-16
- East of Scotland Qualifying Cup: 2015-16; 2017–18
- East of Scotland City Cup: 2015-16

== See also ==
- Greenock Morton F.C. season 2011-12
