= Archie Campbell (footballer, born 1991) =

Scottish footballer

Personal information
- Date of birth: 10 January 1991 (age 35)
- Place of birth: Dunfermline, Scotland
- Position: Striker

Team information
- Current team: Crossgates Primrose

Youth career
- Kelty Hearts Colts
- 2004–2007: Cowdenbeath
- 2007–2010: Rangers

Senior career*
Years	Team	Apps	(Gls)
2010–2011	Rangers	0	(0)
2011	→ Cowdenbeath (loan)	17	(5)
2011–2014	Greenock Morton	86	(21)
2014–2015	Dumbarton	34	(3)
2015–2016	Clyde	16	(0)
2016–2017	Kelty Hearts		
2017–2019	Dundonald Bluebell		
2019	Kelty Hearts		
2019–	Crossgates Primrose		

International career
2007–2008	Scotland U17	13	(5)
2009–2010	Scotland U19	6	(3)
- * Club domestic league appearances and goals as of 15:50, 27 September 2019 (UTC)

Archie Campbell (born 10 January 1991) is a Scottish footballer who plays for Crossgates Primrose.

Campbell started his career at Rangers, but left to join Morton after seven years at Ibrox. He also had a loan spell at Cowdenbeath where he scored five league goals as they failed to avoid relegation.

== Club career ==
Campbell started his career with Cowdenbeath in 2007, having been with the club since the age of 13.

=== Cowdenbeath loan ===
Campbell joined First Division club Cowdenbeath in the 2011 January transfer window on loan until the end of the season. He quickly established himself in the first team squad with three goals in his opening few games – two penalties and a header in a thrilling 4–3. win away to Stirling Albion – Cowden were three goals down with 13 minutes to play but fought back to win.

=== Greenock Morton ===
Campbell was released by Rangers at the end of the 2010–11 season, but joined Greenock Morton after a successful trial. After 17 substitute appearances, Campbell made his first start for Morton on Boxing Day 2011 away at Dens Park against Dundee, setting up the only goal of the game.

In his second start, he scored his first league goal and got another assist, as Morton defeated Ayr United 3–1 at Cappielow.

On 1 September 2012, he scored his first professional hat-trick against Dumbarton to win the game 3–0.

After scoring seven goals in five matches, Campbell was awarded the SFL Young Player of the Month and the Irn-Bru Ginger Boots as top goalscorer in the SFL. In May 2013, Campbell signed on with Morton for another season, rejecting a more lucrative deal at Raith Rovers to do so.

=== Dumbarton ===
On 22 July it was announced that Campbell had joined Dumbarton on a one-year deal. He made his debut as a sub in a 3–2 defeat to Stranraer. Archie scored his first goal for the club against Alloa in a 3–1 win. He left the club in May 2015 having scored three times in 38 appearances.

=== Clyde & Non League ===
He joined League Two side Clyde following his release from Dumbarton in May 2015 before moving on to Kelty Hearts in February 2016. After leaving Kelty he joined Dundonald Bluebell in November 2017. Campbell returned to Kelty in March 2019, Before moving on to East of Scotland side Crossgates Primrose in September.

== International ==
Campbell has been capped for Scotland at both under-17 and under-19 level.

== Career statistics ==
Appearances and goals by club, season and competition
Club	Season	League			Scottish Cup		League Cup		Other^{[A]}		Total	
Club	Season	Division	Apps	Goals	Apps	Goals	Apps	Goals	Apps	Goals	Apps	Goals
Cowdenbeath (loan)	2010–11	Scottish First Division	17	5	0	0	0	0	0	0	17	5
Greenock Morton	2011–12	Scottish First Division	32	5	2	1	1	0	1	0	36	6
Greenock Morton	2012–13	Scottish First Division	22	13	1	0	2	0	1	0	26	13
Greenock Morton	2013–14	Scottish Championship	30	3	1	0	3	2	1	0	35	5
Greenock Morton	Total		86	21	4	1	6	2	3	0	99	24
Dumbarton	2014–15	Scottish Championship	34	3	1	0	2	0	1	0	38	3
Clyde	2015–16	Scottish League Two	16	0	1	0	1	0	1	0	19	0
Career total			153	29	6	1	9	2	5	0	173	32

A. The "Other" column constitutes appearances (including substitutes) and goals in the Scottish Challenge Cup.

== Honours ==
=== Individual ===
- SFL Young Player of the Month – September 2012
- SFL Ginger Boot – September 2012
- SFL Player of the Month – October 2012

== See also ==
- Greenock Morton F.C. season 2011–12 | 2012–13 | 2013–14
