= Alan Combe =

Scottish footballer (born 1974)

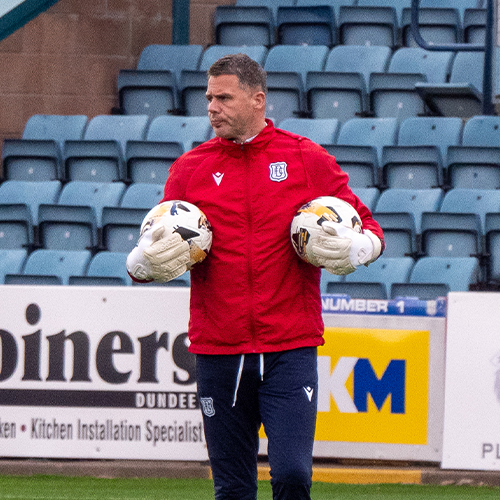
- Alan Combe in 2024

Personal information
- Full name: Alan Combe
- Date of birth: 3 April 1974 (age 52)
- Place of birth: Edinburgh, Scotland

Youth career
- Kelty Hearts

Senior career*
Years	Team	Apps	(Gls)
1992–1993	Cowdenbeath	18	(0)
1993–1998	St Mirren	124	(0)
1998–2003	Dundee United	73	(0)
2002	→ Bradford City (loan)	16	(0)
2003–2004	Bradford City	21	(0)
2004–2011	Kilmarnock	149	(0)
2011	Clyde (trial)	1	(0)
2011	Hamilton Academical (trial)	1	(0)
2012	Greenock Morton	10	(0)
2012–2014	Heart of Midlothian	0	(0)
2014–2015	Hibernian	0	(0)
Total		413	(0)

International career
2005	Scotland B	1	(0)
- * Club domestic league appearances and goals

Alan Combe (born 3 April 1974) is a Scottish football coach and former player who is goalkeeping coach. He played as a goalkeeper for Cowdenbeath, St Mirren, Dundee United, Bradford City and Kilmarnock. He has previously worked as a goalkeeping coach for Alloa Athletic, Heart of Midlothian, Hibernian, Cove Rangers and Dundee.

== Club career ==
Combe was born in Edinburgh. He was Kilmarnock's regular goalkeeper until he suffered a serious hip injury early in the 2009–10 season. He was released by Kilmarnock on 31 January 2011.

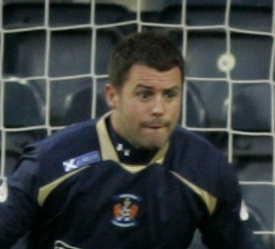
Combe playing for Kilmarnock

Combe joined Alloa Athletic in August 2011 as a goalkeeping coach. In November 2011, Combe played for Clyde against Annan Athletic and kept a clean sheet. He went on trial with Hamilton Academical in December 2011, making his debut on 27 December 2011.

In March 2012, Combe signed a deal with Greenock Morton that was due to run until the end of the 2012–13 season. He left Morton in September 2012 to Join Hearts, primarily as a goalkeeping coach. Combe retained his playing registration during spells with Hearts and Hibernian, but did not appear in a first team match for either club.

== International career ==
Combe was named in the senior Scotland squad on a few occasions but was not capped. Combe did however appear for the Scotland B team in 2005, playing in the second half of a 2–0 victory against Poland B.

== Coaching career ==
While playing for Morton, Combe worked as a goalkeeping coach at Alloa Athletic. Combe was released from his contract with Morton in 2012 to become a goalkeeping coach at Hearts, although he retained his playing registration in case of emergency. After being released by Hearts in 2014, in July Combe joined boyhood club Hibernian as a player-coach. He left Hibernian during the 2020 close season. Combe joined Cove Rangers as a goalkeeping coach in September 2020. In July 2021, Combe was announced as the new goalkeeping coach for Dundee, following the departure of Bobby Geddes. Combe remained in the post for 4 years under several different managers, before being relieved of his duties in May 2025.

== Personal life ==
Combe is the great nephew of Bobby Combe, who played for Hibs and Scotland in the 1940s and 1950s.

== Career statistics ==
Appearances and goals by club, season and competition
Club	Season	League			National cup (Note: Includes Scottish Cup, FA Cup)		League cup (Note: Includes Scottish League Cup, Football League Cup)		Total	
Club	Season	Division	Apps	Goals	Apps	Goals	Apps	Goals	Apps	Goals
Cowdenbeath	1992–93	Scottish First Division	18	0					18	0
St Mirren	1993–94	Scottish First Division	16	0					16	0
St Mirren	1994–95	Scottish First Division	21	0					21	0
St Mirren	1995–96	Scottish First Division	21	0					21	0
St Mirren	1996–97	Scottish First Division	36	0			2	0	38	0
St Mirren	1997–98	Scottish First Division	30	0	1	0	2	0	33	0
St Mirren	Total		124	0	1	0	4	0	129	0
Dundee United	1998–99	Scottish Premier League	10	0	–		–		10	0
Dundee United	1999–2000	Scottish Premier League	35	0	4	0	4	0	43	0
Dundee United	2000–01	Scottish Premier League	23	0	–		3	0	26	0
Dundee United	2002–03	Scottish Premier League	5	0	–		1	0	6	0
Dundee United	TOtal		73	0	4	0	8	0	85	0
Bradford City (loan)	2001–02	Football League First Division	16	0	–		–		16	0
Bradford City	2003–04	Football League First Division	21	0	1	0	–		22	0
Kilmarnock	2004–05	Scottish Premier League	32	0	3	0	2	0	37	0
Kilmarnock	2005–06	Scottish Premier League	32	0	1	0	2	0	35	0
Kilmarnock	2006–07	Scottish Premier League	11	0	0	0	2	0	13	0
Kilmarnock	2007–08	Scottish Premier League	37	0	1	0	2	0	40	0
Kilmarnock	2008–09	Scottish Premier League	34	0	2	0	3	0	39	0
Kilmarnock	Total		146	0	7	0	11	0	164	0
Career total			398	0	13	0	23	0	434	0

== See also ==
- Greenock Morton F.C. season 2011–12 | 2012–13
