= Joel Kasubandi =

Congolese footballer (born 1993)

Personal information
- Date of birth: 25 May 1993 (age 33)
- Place of birth: Kinshasa, Zaire
- Position: Striker

Team information
- Current team: Clydebank

Youth career
- –2007: Celtic
- 2007–2009: Tower Hearts U19
- 2009–2011: St Mirren
- 2011–2012: Greenock Morton

Senior career*
Years	Team	Apps	(Gls)
2012	Greenock Morton	2	(0)
2013–2015	Vale of Clyde		
2015–2017	Clydebank		
2017–2018	Largs Thistle		
2018–2020	Kilbirnie Ladeside		
2021–	Clydebank		
- * Club domestic league appearances and goals as of 17 October 2018

Joel Kasubandi (born 25 May 1993) is a Congolese footballer who plays as a striker for Scottish club Clydebank.

Having moved to Scotland as a child, he began his professional career with St Mirren before making his senior debut for Greenock Morton in 2012. Moving to junior football, he played for Vale of Clyde before joining Clydebank in 2015. He signed for Kilbirnie Ladeside in August 2018.

== Early life ==
Kasubandi was born in Kinshasa, Zaire (now Democratic Republic of the Congo) in 1993. When he was 9 years old, his family moved to Glasgow, Scotland, where he grew up in the Sighthill area of the city. Kasubandi attended Cleveden Secondary School in Kelvindale, Glasgow, followed by Reid Kerr College in Paisley. He played youth football for Celtic, where he became a close friend of teammate Islam Feruz, but was released at the age of 14 because he was considered too small.

== Career ==
After starting his career with Tower Hearts U19s, Kasubandi moved to St Mirren where he player for the U19 squad for the 2010–11 season.

After being released by Saints, he signed for local rivals Greenock Morton, and made his début as a substitute on 14 April 2012. He claimed an assist for the first consolation goal as Morton came back from 4–0 down to narrowly lose by a solitary goal. He was released by Morton in a mass clear-out in May 2012.

In July 2012, Joel joined Second Division side Ayr United on trial – with his first appearance being in a 4–0 win over Champions League qualifiers Motherwell of the SPL. He scored in his first start for Ayr, in a 4–1 defeat by Partick Thistle.

Since leaving Ayr he has also played trial matches for the reserve sides of Preston North End and Dumbarton.

In August 2013, Kasubandi signed for Vale of Clyde. He moved to Clydebank two years later.

In 2017, Kasubandi signed with North Ayrshire Junior side Largs Thistle; a year later he moved on to local rivals Kilbirnie Ladeside.
