= Dominic Cervi =

American soccer player (born 1986)

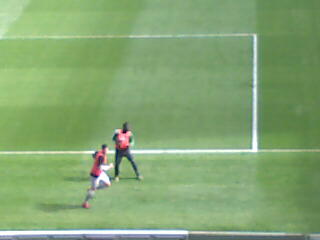
- Cervi and Victor Wanyama warming up

Personal information
- Full name: Dominic Cervi
- Date of birth: July 9, 1986 (age 40)
- Place of birth: Norman, Oklahoma, United States
- Height: 6 ft 6 in (1.98 m)
- Position: Goalkeeper

Youth career
- 1997–2003: Norman Celtic '86

College career
| Years | Team | Apps | (Gls) |
| 2004–2007 | Tulsa Golden Hurricane | | |

Senior career*
| Years | Team | Apps | (Gls) |
| 2006 | Michigan Bucks | 7 | (0) |
| 2008–2012 | Celtic | 0 | (0) |
| 2010–2011 | → Dundee (loan) | 0 | (0) |
| 2011–2012 | → Greenock Morton (loan) | 7 | (0) |

International career
| 2008 | United States U23 | 2 | (0) |
- * Club domestic league appearances and goals as of 8 June 2012

Dominic Cervi (born July 9, 1986) is an American former professional soccer player who played as a goalkeeper.

== Personal life ==
Cervi grew up in Norman, Oklahoma. He played eight seasons for his youth club, Norman Celtic '86. He attended Norman North High School, where he played soccer for all four years. He was named Oklahoma Defensive Player of the Year by The Oklahoman during his junior and senior seasons in 2003 and 2004. He also earned three letters in basketball, where he additionally earned Defensive Player of the Year honors in 2004.

Cervi's great-grandparents were Italian. He received his Italian passport in May 2009, which eliminated the need to obtain a work permit, thus making him a more appealing potential signing for European clubs.

== Club career ==
=== Youth ===
Cervi attended the University of Tulsa from 2004 through 2007, making thirty-one starts for the Golden Hurricane and earning All-Conference USA First Team and NSCAA All-Midwest Region Second Team honors in 2007. The Golden Hurricane's best finish during Cervi's time with the team was during his first year, 2004, when the team reached the national quarterfinal at the 2004 Division I Men's College Cup.

=== Professional ===
Cervi was drafted by the Chicago Fire with the twelfth overall pick of the 2008 MLS SuperDraft, but he did not sign for the club after rejecting a league-minimum contract offer from Major League Soccer. He was the second goalkeeper taken in the draft. After a trial at 2008 FA Cup winners Portsmouth he was not offered a contract.

=== Celtic ===
In October 2008, Cervi joined Celtic on a trial. He made two appearances for Celtic's reserve team, one in a friendly match against Manchester United's reserves, and the other against Greenock Morton. After receiving his Italian passport, Cervi officially joined the SPL club. Cervi never made a competitive first team appearance for Celtic, although was an unused substitute in five league matches.

Cervi was released by the Glasgow club at the end of the 2011-12 season.

=== Loans moves from Celtic ===
On December 10, 2010, Cervi was loaned out to Dundee, but did not make any appearances and returned to Celtic after the loan expired.

On November 4, 2011, Cervi joined Morton on a short-term loan until January. He made his debut the next day in a 1–0 win over Ayr United. Cervi declared himself delighted with the result - saying that it was every goalkeeper's dream to get a clean sheet on their debut.

== International career ==
Cervi was named in the United States national team's 21-man World Cup Qualifying roster for the home-and-home series with Barbados on June 15 and 22, 2008.

Cervi was called up for the USA Under-23 team as the number two keeper for the 2008 CONCACAF Men's Pre-Olympic Tournament. He started for the US in a 1–0 loss against Honduras in the championship game, and again at the U-23 level in a Toulon Tournament match against Turkey. Cervi is eligible to only represent the United States internationally due to his appearances against Honduras and Turkey.

On May 15, 2008, he was invited to camp for friendlies against England, Spain, and Argentina, but made no appearances.

In 2010, he was named in the US squad that defeated South Africa 1–0 on November 17 in Cape Town. He did not play, however, serving as second choice keeper for the match behind Brad Guzan.

Despite having a number of call-ups to his name, Cervi never appeared in a match for the senior national team of the United States.

== Business career ==
After leaving Celtic, Cervi studied at the University of Denver and graduated with a degree in Finance and Accounting. He then embarked on a career in investment banking with U.S. banking firm Capstone Headwaters.

== See also ==
- Greenock Morton F.C. season 2011-12
