= Creag Little =

Scottish footballer

Personal information
- Date of birth: 16 April 1993 (age 33)
- Place of birth: Greenock, Scotland
- Position: Defender

Team information
- Current team: Clydebank FC

Youth career
- St Mirren

Senior career*
Years	Team	Apps	(Gls)
2011–2012	Greenock Morton	6	(0)
2012	→ Largs Thistle (loan)	7	(0)
2012–2019	Largs Thistle	62	(8)
2019–2020	Queen's Park	18	(0)
2020–2021	Stenhousemuir	19	(1)
2021–2022	Elgin City	7	(0)
2021–2022	→ Darvel (loan)	0	(0)
2022–	Darvel	0	(0)

International career
2009	Scotland U17		
- * Club domestic league appearances and goals as of 21:22, 11 January 2022 (UTC)

Creag Little (born 16 April 1993, in Greenock) is a Scottish professional footballer who plays as a defender for Darvel.

He began his senior career with Greenock Morton, after coming through the youth system of rivals St Mirren. He has also played for Largs Thistle and Queen's Park.

== Club career ==
Little started his career with St Mirren before transferring to Greenock Morton in the June 2011.

He made his first team début from the substitutes bench in a 5–0 win over Forfar Athletic in the second round of the Challenge Cup in August 2011, replacing Stuart McCaffrey after 77 minutes.

In March 2012, Little was loaned to Largs Thistle. He made his début in a home 1–1 draw with Petershill.

He was released by Morton in May 2012. After this he made his loan spell to Largs Thistle permanent. He was sent off in his first league game of his second spell at the club, in a 1–1 draw with Kilsyth Rangers.

In 2019, Little returned to senior football signing for Glasgow side Queen's Park.

On 1 July 2020, Little signed for Scottish League Two side Stenhousemuir.

Little then signed a two-year contract with Elgin City on 14 May 2021. On 12 October 2021, Little joined West of Scotland Football League side Darvel on loan until January 2022. On 11 January 2022, Little signed for Darvel on a permanent basis.

== International career ==
Little represented Scotland at under-17 level, whilst on the books of St Mirren.

== See also ==
- Greenock Morton F.C. season 2011-12
