= 2009–10 Greenock Morton F.C. season =

Greenock Morton
2009–10 season
- Chairman: Douglas Rae
- Manager: Davie Irons (19/2/08-21/9/09); James Grady (31/10/09-9/5/10)
- Scottish First Division: 8th
- Scottish Cup: Fourth round (eliminated by Celtic)
- League Cup: Second round (eliminated by Kilmarnock)
- Challenge Cup: Second round (eliminated by Ross County)
- Top goalscorer: League: Peter Weatherson (10); All: Peter Weatherson (12)
- Highest home attendance: League: 3,771 vs Ayr United (1 May 2010); Cup: 10,191 vs Celtic (19 January 2009)
- Lowest home attendance: League: 1,219 vs Ross County (13 April 2010); Cup: 1,882 vs Dumbarton (28 November 2009)
- Average home league attendance: 1,969
Home colours	Away colours	Third colours

Season 2009–10 saw Greenock Morton compete in their third consecutive season in the First Division, in which they finished 8th after a last day victory over Ayr United which relegated the visitors.

== Story of the season ==
=== May ===
After the end of the 2008–09 season, Kieran McAnespie (signed for amateur side Milngavie Wanderers), Jamie Stevenson (signed for East Stirlingshire), Chris Smith (signed for Dumbarton) and Jon Newby (signed for Northwich Victoria) were all released.

Brian Graham returned from his loan spell at East Stirlingshire, where he finished as the Third Division's top scoring forward.

=== June ===
Neil MacFarlane was brought in under freedom of contract from Queen of the South.

=== July ===
Bryn Halliwell signed as emergency goalkeeping cover following injuries to Kevin Cuthbert and Colin Stewart.

=== August ===
At the end of Halliwell's short-term contract, he was released before the close of the transfer window thus making him available to sign for a new club at any time after the window shut.

Morton were knocked out of the two SFL cup competitions by Ross County and Kilmarnock, after victories over Dumbarton and Cowdenbeath.

=== September ===
Davie Irons and Derek Collins had their contracts as the club's management team cancelled on 21 September, with the club sitting bottom of the First Division with only three points from their first six games. Allan McManus and James Grady took over as caretakers until replacements for Irons and Collins could be appointed.

Iain Russell was loaned out to Alloa Athletic.

=== October ===
McManus and Grady were appointed permanently (until the end of the season) on Halloween 2009. This time though, Grady was made manager with McManus his assistant.

=== November ===
With injuries mounting up, Grady brought in Alan Reid and David van Zanten in on trial. Both players made their débuts on 7 November, against Partick Thistle, this was however Reid's THIRD début for the club having played two games on trial the previous season and having a spell on loan in 2001. On 10 November, it was revealed in the Greenock Telegraph that van Zanten had signed on a permanent contract until January 2010.

Alan Reid was signed on a permanent basis on 27 November, following the release of Ryan Harding by mutual consent.

=== December ===
After a replay, Morton defeated Dumbarton, to set up a Scottish Cup fourth round tie at Cappielow against Celtic.

=== January ===
David van Zanten's short-term deal at Cappielow expires, and the Irishman signs for Hamilton Academical.

Ex-Celtic youth Michael Tidser returns from Sweden, where he played for Ostersunds FK to sign with Morton.

Alex Walker was loaned out to Brechin City for three months.

Brian Wake was released, with his next destination being Gateshead.

As the transfer window slammed shut, Kevin McKinlay was signed on a free transfer.

=== February ===
Erik Paartalu signed a pre-contract agreement with Brisbane Roar back in his homeland of Australia.

Donovan Simmonds was signed until the end of the season on a free transfer from Maltese Premier League side Floriana.

=== March ===
Austrian Striker David Witteveen signed on loan from Hearts until the end of the season.

Iain Russell and Ryan McWilliams were sent out on loan to Stirling Albion and Largs Thistle respectively.

=== April ===
Jim McAlister broke his foot in a 3–3 draw with Queen of the South – this was most likely his final game for Morton with his contract running down at the end of the season.

Michael Tidser was awarded the Scottish Football League young player of the month award for March.

=== May ===
With a 2–1 victory at Cappielow over Ayr United, Morton avoided relegation to the Second Division whilst condemning their opponents to automatic relegation.

== First team transfers ==
- From end of 2008–09 season, to last match of season 2009–10

=== In ===
Player	From	Fee
(Scotland) Neil MacFarlane	Queen of the South	Free (June 2009)
(England) Bryn Halliwell	Queen of the South	Free (July 2009)
(Republic of Ireland) David van Zanten	Hibernian	Free (November 2009)
(Scotland) Alan Reid	Unattached	Free (November 2009)
(Scotland) Michael Tidser	Östersunds FK (Sweden)	Free (January 2010)
(Scotland) Kevin McKinlay	Dundalk (Ireland)	Free (February 2010)
(England) Donovan Simmonds	Floriana (Malta)	Free (February 2010)
(Austria) David Witteveen	Heart of Midlothian	Loan (March 2010)

=== Out ===
Player	To	Fee
(Scotland) Kieran McAnespie	Milngavie Wanderers	Free (May 2009)
(Scotland) Jamie Stevenson	East Stirlingshire	Free (July 2009)
(England) Jon Newby	Northwich Victoria (England)	Free (July 2009)
(Scotland) Chris Smith	Dumbarton	Free (August 2009)
(England) Bryn Halliwell	Forfar Athletic	Free (August 2009)
(Scotland) Iain Russell	Alloa Athletic	Loan (September 2009)
(Scotland) Ryan Harding	East Stirlingshire	Free (November 2009)
(Republic of Ireland) David van Zanten	Hamilton Academical	Free (January 2010)
(Scotland) Alex Walker	Brechin City	Loan (January 2010)
(England) Brian Wake	Gateshead (England)	Free (January 2010)
(Scotland) Iain Russell	Stirling Albion	Loan (March 2010)
(Scotland) Ryan McWilliams	Largs Thistle	Loan (March 2010)

== Squad (that played for first team) ==
Note: Flags indicate national team as defined under FIFA eligibility rules; some limited exceptions apply. Players may hold more than one non-FIFA nationality.

No.	Pos.	Nation	Player
—	GK	SCO	Kevin Cuthbert
—	GK	ENG	Bryn Halliwell (short-term contract)
—	GK	SCO	Ryan McWilliams
—	GK	SCO	Colin Stewart
—	DF	SCO	Stewart Greacen (captain)
—	DF	SCO	Ryan Harding
—	DF	SCO	David MacGregor
—	DF	SCO	Allan McManus
—	DF	SCO	Alan Reid
—	DF	ENG	Dominic Shimmin
—	DF	IRL	David van Zanten (short-term contract)
—	DF	SCO	Alex Walker
—	MF	SCO	Kevin Finlayson
—	MF	SCO	Allan Jenkins
—	MF	SCO	Ryan Kane

No.	Pos.	Nation	Player
—	MF	SCO	Neil MacFarlane
—	MF	SCO	Steven Masterton
—	MF	SCO	Jim McAlister
—	MF	SCO	Ryan McGuffie
—	MF	SCO	Kevin McKinlay
—	MF	SCO	Carlo Monti
—	MF	AUS	Erik Paartalu
—	MF	SCO	Michael Tidser
—	FW	SCO	Brian Graham
—	FW	SCO	James Grady
—	FW	SCO	Iain Russell
—	FW	ENG	Donovan Simmonds
—	FW	ENG	Brian Wake
—	FW	ENG	Peter Weatherson
—	FW	AUT	David Witteveen (on loan from Hearts)

== Fixtures and results ==
Win Draw Loss Upcoming fixture

=== Friendlies ===
Date	Opponents	Stadium	Result F–A	Scorers	Attendance
2 July 2009	(Slovakia) Slovan Bratislava	Austrian training camp	1–6	Adam Strachan (trialist)	?
4 July 2009	(Austria) Salzburg Sports Club 1914	Austrian training camp	8–1	Ryan McGuffie; Brian Wake; Steven Masterton; Brian Graham pen'	?
7 July 2009	Stranraer	Toryglen	10 – 0 (abandoned)	Brian Wake; Brian Graham; Peter Weatherson; Carlo Monti; Jim McAlister; Trialists	Public Park
11 July 2009	Annan Athletic	Galabank, Annan	1–1	Steven Masterton pen'	525
13 July 2009	(England) Crawley Town	Cappielow Park, Greenock	2–3	Jim McAlister	407
18 July 2009	(England) Oxford United	Cappielow Park, Greenock	0–3		859
20 July 2009	(Romania) Unirea Urziceni	Cappielow Park, Greenock	1–3	Steven Masterton	1,059
23 July 2009	Kilmarnock	Maryhill Science Centre, Glasgow	1–1	Iain Russell	Public Park
28 July 2009	St Mirren (Renfrewshire Cup Final)	St Mirren Park, Paisley	1–2	Allan Jenkins	4,312
5 September 2009	Clyde	Cappielow Park, Greenock	4–0	Erik Paartalu; Peter Weatherson	Closed Door
14 September 2009	Rangers	Murray Park, Milngavie	1–3	Allan Jenkins	Closed Door
15 December 2009	Rangers	Murray Park, Milngavie	1–1	Brian Wake	Closed Door
22 December 2009	St Johnstone	Toryglen	4–1	Brian Wake; Brian Graham pen'	Public Park
8 January 2010	St Johnstone	Toryglen	0–1		Public Park
3 February 2010	Hamilton Academical	New Douglas Park, Hamilton	4–1	Donovan Simmonds (trialist); Jim McAlister; Steven Masterton; Own Goal	Closed Door
8 February 2010	St Johnstone	Cappielow Park, Greenock	0–1		Closed Door

=== Irn-Bru Scottish Football League First Division ===
Date	Opponents	Stadium	Result F–A	Events	Attendance	Points	Referee
8 August 2009	Dundee	Dens Park, Dundee	0–1	Steven Masterton (yellow card); Kevin Finlayson (yellow card); Brian Graham (yellow card)	5,449	0	C Boyle
15 August 2009	Dunfermline Athletic	Cappielow Park, Greenock	0–2	Stewart Greacen (yellow card) 10'	2,661	0	W Collum
22 August 2009	Ayr United	Somerset Park, Ayr	2–0	Peter Weatherson; 23', 85'; Brian Graham (yellow card) 66'	2,304	3	E Norris
29 August 2009	Partick Thistle	Firhill Stadium, Glasgow	0–5	Neil MacFarlane (yellow card) 56'; Stewart Greacen (red card) 67'	2,986	3	J McKendrick
12 September 2009	Inverness Caledonian Thistle	Cappielow Park, Greenock	0–3	Jim McAlister (yellow card) 23'	1,946	3	C Richmond
19 September 2009	Raith Rovers	Stark's Park, Kirkcaldy	0–3	Alex Walker (yellow card) 45'; Neil MacFarlane (yellow card) 59'; Stewart Greacen (yellow card) 61'	2,040	3	S Finnie
26 September 2009	Airdrie United	Cappielow Park, Greenock	1–0	Brian Graham 79' (yellow card) 79'; David MacGregor (yellow card) 90'	2,104	6	S O'Reilly
3 October 2009	Queen of the South	Palmerston Park, Dumfries	3–2	Brian Graham 13'; Peter Weatherson 39'; Allan Jenkins 60'	2,630	9	D McDonald
10 October 2009	Ross County	Cappielow Park, Greenock	0–1	Neil MacFarlane (yellow card); Peter Weatherson (yellow card)	2,154	9	C Boyle
17 October 2009	Dundee	Cappielow Park, Greenock	0–1	Allan McManus (yellow card)	2,217	9	B Winter
24 October 2009	Dunfermline Athletic	East End Park, Dunfermline	1–3	Erik Paartalu (yellow card) 70'; Ryan McGuffie 74'	2,411	9	S Nicholls
31 October 2009	Inverness Caledonian Thistle	Tulloch Caledonian Stadium, Inverness	1–4	Erik Paartalu (yellow card) 28' (goal) 33'	3,021	9	C Murray
7 November 2009	Partick Thistle	Cappielow Park, Greenock	0–2		2,738	9	G Salmond
14 November 2009	Raith Rovers	Cappielow Park, Greenock	5–0	Erik Paartalu 14'; Brian Wake 55', 60'; Peter Weatherson; 62', 89'; David van Zanten (yellow card) 73'	1,716	12	S O'Reilly
21 November 2009	Airdrie United	Shyberry Excelsior Stadium, Drumgelloch	4–2	Ryan McGuffie 43'; Brian Wake; 45', 53'; Erik Paartalu (yellow card) 49'; David van Zanten 67'	1,164	15	S Conroy
8 December 2009	Ross County	Victoria Park, Dingwall	1–3	Erik Paartalu 29'; Carlo Monti (yellow card) 62'; Alan Reid (red card) 85'	1,752	15	J McKendrick
12 December 2009	Queen of the South	Cappielow Park, Greenock	1–2	Peter Weatherson 23'	1,814	15	S Nicholls
19 December 2009	Dundee	Dens Park, Dundee	1–3	Peter Weatherson 60'; Carlo Monti (yellow card) 82'	4,259	15	C Murray
4 January 2010	Partick Thistle	Firhill Stadium, Glasgow	0–1		2,192	15	I Brines
23 January 2010	Raith Rovers	Stark's Park, Kirkcaldy	2–1	Peter Weatherson; 33', 79'; Michael Tidser (yellow card) 39'; Ryan McGuffie (yellow card) 50'	1,702	18	C Allan
13 February 2010	Queen of the South	Palmerston Park, Dumfries	2–1	Steven Masterton; 7', 31' (pen.) (yellow card) 58'; Kevin Finlayson; (yellow card) 72' (yellow card) 77' (red card); Brian Graham (yellow card) 90'; Allan Jenkins (yellow card) 90'	2,611	21	C Brown
27 February 2010	Dunfermline Athletic	Cappielow Park, Greenock	1–2	Ryan McGuffie 55'; Stewart Greacen (yellow card) 68'	1,776	21	C Thomson
6 March 2010	Ayr United	Somerset Park, Ayr	0–2	Dominic Shimmin (yellow card) 31'; Stewart Greacen; (yellow card) 58' (yellow card) 84' (red card)	2,145	21	S Nicholls
13 March 2010	Inverness Caledonian Thistle	Tulloch Caledonian Stadium, Inverness	0–1	Steven Masterton (yellow card) 58'	2,708	21	S McLean
17 March 2010	Airdrie United	Cappielow Park, Greenock	2–1	Peter Weatherson; 20' (yellow card) 42'; David MacGregor 66'; Michael Tidser (yellow card) 80'; Donovan Simmonds (yellow card) 90'	1,266	24	S Conroy
20 March 2010	Partick Thistle	Cappielow Park, Greenock	1–0	Steven Masterton (yellow card) 59'; Peter Weatherson (yellow card) 84'; Jim McAlister 90+3'	2,163	27	B Madden
23 March 2010	Raith Rovers	Cappielow Park, Greenock	1–1	Kevin McKinlay (yellow card) 26'; Peter Weatherson (yellow card) 74'; Donovan Simmonds 85'	1,415	28	S McLean
27 March 2010	Airdrie United	Shyberry Excelsior Stadium, Drumgelloch	0–3	Kevin Cuthbert (red card) 15'; Kevin McKinlay (yellow card) 64'	1,017	28	B Colvin
30 March 2010	Ayr United	Cappielow Park, Greenock	1–0	Michael Tidser (yellow card) 40'; Steven Masterton 78'; Jim McAlister (yellow card) 89'	1,286	31	A Law
3 April 2010	Queen of the South	Cappielow Park, Greenock	3–3	David Witteveen; 15', 22' (yellow card) 63'; 90+1'	1,926	32	J McKendrick
6 April 2010	Inverness Caledonian Thistle	Cappielow Park, Greenock	0–2		1,277	32	B Winter
13 April 2010	Ross County	Cappielow Park, Greenock	1–1	Carlo Monti; 6' (pen.) (yellow card) 60'; Erik Paartalu (yellow card) 48'; Stewart Greacen (yellow card) 69'; Brian Graham (yellow card) 90+1'	1,219	33	F McDermott
17 April 2010	Dundee	Cappielow Park, Greenock	2–2	David Witteveen 41'; Carlo Monti 64' (pen.); Stewart Greacen (yellow card) 86'	1,998	34	A Muir
24 April 2010	Dunfermline Athletic	East End Park, Dunfermline	1–4	Carlo Monti 40' (pen.); Dominic Shimmin (yellow card) 90'	2,532	34	S Conroy
26 April 2010	Ross County	Victoria Park, Dingwall	1–2	David Witteveen; (yellow card) 34' (goal) 52'; Ryan McGuffie (yellow card) 40'; Donovan Simmonds (yellow card) 78'	1,850	34	C Charleston
1 May 2010	Ayr United	Cappielow Park, Greenock	2–1	Stewart Greacen; (yellow card) 17' (goal) 77'; Carlo Monti 86' (yellow card) 88'	3,771	37	C Richmond

=== Active Nation Scottish Cup ===
Date	Round	Opponents	Stadium	Result F–A	Events	Attendance	Referee
28 November 2009	Round 3	Dumbarton	Cappielow Park, Greenock	0–0	Alan Reid (yellow card) 37'	1,882	S McLean
5 December 2009	Round 3 Replay	Dumbarton	Strathclyde Homes Stadium, Dumbarton	1–0	Brian Graham 74' (yellow card) 86'; Erik Paartalu (yellow card) 86'	1,495	S McLean
19 January 2010	Round 4	Celtic	Cappielow Park, Greenock	0–1	Stewart Greacen (yellow card) 51'; Neil MacFarlane (yellow card) 75'	10,191	C Thomson

=== League Cup ===
Date	Round	Opponents	Stadium	Result F–A	Events	Attendance	Referee
1 August 2009	Round 1	Cowdenbeath	Central Park, Cowdenbeath	3–1	Peter Weatherson 7', 51'; Neil MacFarlane 12'; Allan Jenkins (yellow card) 76'	486	B Winter
25 August 2009	Round 2	Kilmarnock	Rugby Park, Kilmarnock	1–3	Ryan McGuffie 44' (pen.); Kevin Finlayson (yellow card) 54'; Allan Jenkins (yellow card) 73'	3,645	M Tumilty

=== Challenge Cup ===
Date	Round	Opponents	Stadium	Result F–A	Events	Attendance	Referee
26 July 2009	Round 1	Dumbarton	Strathclyde Homes Stadium, Dumbarton	1–0	Allan Jenkins 25'; Stewart Greacen (yellow card) 33'; Steven Masterton (yellow card) 33'; Neil MacFarlane (yellow card) 40'	1,122	S Finnie
19 August 2009	Round 2	Ross County	Victoria Park, Dingwall	1–2	Steven Masterton 63' (yellow card) 71'	588	J McKendrick

== League table ==
Pos	Team	Pld	W	D	L	GF	GA	GD	Pts	Promotion, qualification or relegation
6	Partick Thistle	36	14	6	16	43	40	+3	48	
7	Raith Rovers	36	11	9	16	36	47	−11	42	
8	Greenock Morton	36	11	4	21	40	65	−25	37	
9	Airdrie United (R)	36	8	9	19	41	56	−15	33	Qualification to the First Division play-offs
10	Ayr United (R)	36	7	10	19	29	60	−31	31	Relegation to the Second Division

Source: Scottish Football League
Rules for classification: 1) points; 2) goal difference; 3) number of goals scored.
First Division play-offs: The 9th place team will be entered into a play-off with the 2nd, 3rd and 4th places of the Second Division. The winner gets a place in the 2010-11 First Division
(R) Relegated

== Player statistics ==
As of 1 May

=== All competitions ===
#	Player	Played	Subs	Goal	Sent off (straight red)	Booked
GK	(England) Bryn Halliwell	4	0	0	0	0
GK	(Scotland) Ryan McWilliams	3	0	0	0	0
GK	(Scotland) Colin Stewart	30	1	0	0	0
GK	(Scotland) Kevin Cuthbert	6	0	0	1	0
DF	(Scotland) Stewart Greacen	37	0	1	2	9
DF	(Scotland) Allan McManus	14	0	0	0	1
DF	(Scotland) Alex Walker	5	0	0	0	1
DF	(Scotland) Ryan Harding	4	0	0	0	0
DF	(Scotland) David MacGregor	23	7	1	0	1
DF	(Republic of Ireland) David van Zanten	9	0	1	0	1
DF	(Scotland) Alan Reid	19	0	0	1	1
DF	(England) Dominic Shimmin	18	0	0	0	2
MF	(Scotland) Jim McAlister	37	0	1	0	2
MF	(Scotland) Neil MacFarlane	21	0	1	0	5
MF	(Scotland) Ryan McGuffie	36	2	4	0	2
MF	(Scotland) Allan Jenkins	23	6	2	0	2
MF	(Scotland) Kevin Finlayson	33	5	0	1	3
MF	(Scotland) Steven Masterton	14	5	4	0	6
MF	(Scotland) Carlo Monti	19	4	4	0	5
MF	(Australia) Erik Paartalu	18	12	3	0	5
MF	(Scotland) Ryan Kane	0	5	0	0	0
MF	(Scotland) Michael Tidser	13	0	0	0	3
MF	(Scotland) Kevin McKinlay	7	1	0	0	2
FW	(England) Peter Weatherson	37	3	12	0	4
FW	(Scotland) Brian Graham	12	17	3	0	6
FW	(England) Brian Wake	9	10	4	0	0
FW	(Scotland) James Grady	1	4	0	0	0
FW	(Scotland) Iain Russell	5	1	0	0	0
FW	(England) Donovan Simmonds	7	7	1	0	2
FW	(Austria) David Witteveen	9	0	5	0	2
