= 2008–09 Greenock Morton F.C. season =

Greenock Morton
2008–09 season
- Chairman: Douglas Rae
- Manager: Davie Irons
- Scottish First Division: 6th
- Scottish Cup: Third round (eliminated by Peterhead)
- League Cup: Third round (eliminated by Inverness CT)
- Challenge Cup: Semi-final (eliminated by Ross County)
- Top goalscorer: League: Peter Weatherson, Brian Wake (9); All: Brian Wake (12)
- Highest home attendance: League: 3,323 vs Partick Thistle (18 April 2008); Cup: 2,023 vs Inverness CT (23 September 2008)
- Lowest home attendance: League: 1,642 vs Airdrie United (25 November 2008); Cup: 2,023 vs Inverness CT (23 September 2008)
- Average home league attendance: 2,274
Home colours	Away colours	Third colours

Season 2008–09 saw Greenock Morton compete in their second consecutive season in the First Division. They finished sixth in the league, a rise from the previous season's avoidance of the relegation play-off by one goal.

== First team transfers ==
- From end of 2007–08 season, to last match of season 2008–09

=== In ===
Player	From	Fee
(Scotland) Steven Masterton	Clyde	Free
(Scotland) Kevin Cuthbert	St Johnstone	Free
(England) Jon Newby	Morecambe	Free
(England) Dominic Shimmin	Crawley Town	Free
(Scotland) Allan McManus	St Johnstone	Free
(Scotland) James Grady	Hamilton Academical	Loan
(Scotland) James Grady	Hamilton Academical	Free
(Scotland) Chris Smith	Rangers	Free
(Scotland) Colin Stewart	Livingston	Free
(Scotland) Carlo Monti	Celtic	Free

=== Out ===
Player	To	Fee
(Scotland) Craig Black	Largs Thistle	Free
(Scotland) Adam Coakley	Queen's Park	Free
(Scotland) Bobby Linn	East Fife	Free
(Scotland) Barry Smith	Valur	Loan Return
(Scotland) Dean Keenan	Ayr United	Free
(Scotland) Chris Templeman	East Fife	Free
(Scotland) David McGurn	Raith Rovers	Free
(England) Jon Newby	Burton Albion	Loan
(England) Lee Robinson	Rangers	Loan Return
(Scotland) Scott McLaughlin	Airdrie United	Free
(Scotland) Chris Millar	St Johnstone	Free
(Scotland) Jamie Stevenson	Alloa Athletic	Loan
(Scotland) Brian Graham	East Stirlingshire	Loan
(Scotland) Jamie Stevenson	East Stirlingshire	Loan
(Scotland) Kieran McAnespie	Dumbarton	Loan

== Squad (that played for first team) ==
Note: Flags indicate national team as defined under FIFA eligibility rules; some limited exceptions apply. Players may hold more than one non-FIFA nationality.

No.	Pos.	Nation	Player
—	GK	SCO	Kevin Cuthbert
—	GK	SCO	Colin Stewart
—	DF	SCO	Stewart Greacen (captain)
—	DF	SCO	Ryan Harding
—	DF	SCO	David MacGregor
—	DF	SCO	Allan McManus
—	DF	SCO	Alan Reid (trialist)
—	DF	ENG	Dominic Shimmin
—	DF	SCO	Chris Smith
—	DF	SCO	Alex Walker
—	MF	SCO	Kevin Finlayson

No.	Pos.	Nation	Player
—	MF	SCO	Allan Jenkins
—	MF	SCO	Steven Masterton
—	MF	SCO	Jim McAlister
—	MF	SCO	Ryan McGuffie
—	MF	SCO	Carlo Monti
—	MF	AUS	Erik Paartalu
—	FW	SCO	James Grady (loaned from Hamilton Academical)
—	FW	ENG	Jon Newby
—	FW	SCO	Iain Russell
—	FW	ENG	Brian Wake
—	FW	ENG	Peter Weatherson

== Fixtures and results ==
Win Draw Loss

=== Friendlies ===
Date	Opponents	Stadium	Result F – A	Scorers	Attendance
7 July 2008	Threave Rovers	Meadow Park, Castle Douglas	9–0	Brian Wake; Iain Russell; Jim McAlister; Jon Newby; Steven Masterton; Erik Paartalu	?
9 July 2008	(England) Tow Law Town	Ironworks Road Ground, Tow Law	1–1	Iain Russell	?
10 July 2008	(England) Durham City	The Archibald's Stadium, Durham	3–0	Jon Newby; Brian Wake; Erik Paartalu	?
12 July 2008	Ayr United	Cappielow Park, Greenock	0–1		?
15 July 2008	(England) Hartlepool United	Cappielow Park, Greenock	1–2	Steven Masterton	?
16 July 2008	Celtic	Lennoxtown, Glasgow	1–5	Steven Masterton	Closed Door
18 July 2008	Dumbarton	Strathclyde Homes Stadium, Dumbarton	1–0	Ryan McGuffie	566
21 July 2008	Carlton YMCA (Renfrewshire Cup SF)	Cappielow Park, Greenock	9–0	Iain Russell; Brian Wake; Erik Paartalu; Jon Newby; Kevin Finlayson; Ryan McGuffie	?
22 July 2008	Rangers	Murray Park, Milngavie	1–3	Brian Wake	Closed Door
26 July 2008	St Mirren (Renfrewshire Cup Final)	Cappielow Park, Greenock	1 – 1 (4 – 5 on pens)	Iain Russell	3,836
3 September 2008	Partick Thistle	Cappielow Park, Greenock	2–2	Peter Weatherson; Trialist	Closed Door
20 September 2008	Ayr United	Glasgow Green, Glasgow	4–4	Allan Jenkins; Kieran McAnespie	Public Park
4 November 2008	St Johnstone	Cappielow Park, Greenock	2–4	?	Closed Door
13 November 2008	Celtic XI	Cappielow Park, Greenock	0–0		?
19 November 2008	Hamilton Academical	Cappielow Park, Greenock	4–3	Iain Russell; Brian Wake; Kevin Finlayson	Closed Door
7 January 2009	Rangers	Murray Park, Milngavie	0–1		Closed Door
12 January 2009	Ayr United	Glasgow Green, Glasgow	2–1	Peter Weatherson; Iain Russell	Public Park
28 January 2009	St Mirren	St Mirren Park, Paisley	0–2		Closed Door
19 February 2009	Dumbarton	Cappielow Park, Greenock	0–2		Closed Door
28 April 2009	Viewfield Rovers (Renfrewshire Cup SF)	Cappielow Park, Greenock	11–0	Ryan McGuffie; Kevin Finlayson; Iain Russell; Peter Weatherson; Brian Wake; James Grady	?

=== Irn-Bru Scottish Football League First Division ===
Date	Opponents	Stadium	Result F – A	Scorers	Attendance	Points	Referee
2 August 2008	Clyde	Broadwood Stadium, Cumbernauld	1–1	Jon Newby 40'; Brian Wake (yellow card) 86' (red card)	1,638	1	C Boyle
9 August 2008	St Johnstone	Cappielow Park, Greenock	2–2	Ryan McGuffie 5'; Erik Paartalu 82'	2,649	2	C Brown
16 August 2008	Livingston	Cappielow Park, Greenock	1–2	Brian Wake 31'	2,502	2	B Winter
23 August 2008	Dundee	Dens Park, Dundee	0–1		4,032	2	J McKendrick
30 August 2008	Airdrie United	Shyberry Excelsior Stadium, Drumgelloch	0–5		1,793	2	A Muir
13 September 2008	Queen of the South	Cappielow Park, Greenock	0–0		2,235	3	C Allan
20 September 2008	Partick Thistle	Firhill Stadium, Glasgow	1–2	Iain Russell 44'	3,368	3	S Finnie
27 September 2008	Dunfermline Athletic	Cappielow Park, Greenock	1–1	Brian Wake 60'	2,156	4	S Nicholls
4 October 2008	Ross County	Victoria Park, Dingwall	0–3		2,290	4	A Muir
18 October 2008	Clyde	Cappielow Park, Greenock	1–0	James Grady 37'	2,041	7	E Norris
25 October 2008	Dundee	Cappielow Park, Greenock	2–0	Peter Weatherson 26'; Ryan McGuffie 59' (pen.)	1,741	10	C Thomson
1 November 2008	Livingston	Almondvale Stadium, Livingston	0–1		1,733	10	B Winter
8 November 2008	Queen of the South	Palmerston Park, Dumfries	4–1	Peter Weatherson 19', 28'; Allan Jenkins 37'; Stewart Greacen 74'	2,944	13	D Somers
22 November 2008	Dunfermline Athletic	East End Park, Dunfermline	0–1	Erik Paartalu 24'	4,400	16	M McCurry
25 November 2008	Airdrie United	Cappielow Park, Greenock	2–0	Brian Wake 34'; Allan Jenkins 90'	1,642	19	C Allan
13 December 2008	St Johnstone	McDiarmid Park, Perth	0–1		2,749	19	S O'Reilly
20 December 2008	Ross County	Cappielow Park, Greenock	2–1	Steven Masterton 35'; Brian Wake 64'	1,853	22	C Charleston
27 December 2008	Airdrie United	Shyberry Excelsior Stadium, Drumgelloch	0–1	Kevin Cuthbert (red card) 44'	1,663	22	C Murray
30 December 2008	Partick Thistle	Cappielow Park, Greenock	2–0	Steven Masterton 17'; Peter Weatherson 65'	2,385	25	J McKendrick
3 January 2009	Queen of the South	Cappielow Park, Greenock	2–2	Peter Weatherson 33', 90'	2,647	26	S Nicholls
17 January 2009	Dundee	Dens Park, Dundee	0–0		3,736	27	C Brown
24 January 2009	Livingston	Cappielow Park, Greenock	2–2	Brian Wake 13'; Ryan McGuffie 16'	2,307	28	I Brines
31 January 2009	St Johnstone	Cappielow Park, Greenock	0–0		2,810	29	C Thomson
21 February 2009	Partick Thistle	Firhill Stadium, Glasgow	0–1		3,348	29	C Charleston
28 February 2009	Dunfermline Athletic	Cappielow Park, Greenock	2–1	Peter Weatherson 28'; Stewart Greacen 48'	2,092	32	M Tumilty
3 March 2009	Clyde	Broadwood Stadium, Cumbernauld	4–2	Erik Paartalu 32'; Iain Russell 70'; Brian Wake 86', 90'	1,165	35	M McCurry
7 March 2009	Queen of the South	Palmerston Park, Dumfries	1–1	James Grady 41'	2,643	36	B Winter
10 March 2009	Airdrie United	Cappielow Park, Greenock	0–0		1,865	37	E Norris
14 March 2009	Clyde	Cappielow Park, Greenock	2–0	Allan Jenkins 18'; Steven Masterton 68' (pen.)	2,168	40	S Conroy
21 March 2009	Ross County	Victoria Park, Dingwall	1–1	Iain Russell 90'	2,236	41	C Boyle
4 April 2009	Dundee	Cappielow Park, Greenock	2–0	Peter Weatherson 29', 79'	2,133	44	C Murray
11 April 2009	Livingston	Almondvale Stadium, Livingston	2–0	Brian Wake 19', 83'	1,815	47	G Salmond
18 April 2009	Partick Thistle	Cappielow Park, Greenock	0–1		3,323	47	A Law
2 May 2009	St Johnstone	McDiarmid Park, Perth	1–3	Ryan McGuffie 25' (pen.)	6,453	47	S Nicholls
5 May 2009	Dunfermline Athletic	East End Park, Dunfermline	1–3	Carlo Monti 62'	1,438	47	B Winter
9 May 2009	Ross County	Cappielow Park, Greenock	0–2		1,956	47	S Dougal

=== Homecoming Scottish Cup ===
Date	Round	Opponents	Stadium	Result F – A	Scorers	Attendance	Referee
29 November 2008	Round 3	Peterhead	Balmoor Stadium, Peterhead	1–2	Steven Masterton 24'; Peter Weatherson (red card) 66'	817	S MacDonald

=== League Cup ===
Date	Round	Opponents	Stadium	Result F – A	Scorers	Attendance	Referee
5 August 2008	Round 1	Stranraer	Stair Park, Stranraer	6–3	Ryan McGuffie 5'; Brian Wake 12', 85'; Iain Russell 23', 32'; Erik Paartalu 42'	317	S Finnie
26 August 2008	Round 2	Hibernian	Easter Road Stadium, Edinburgh	3 – 4 AET	Iain Russell 29', 115' (pen.); Steven Masterton 66'; Ryan Harding 118'	6,329	I Brines
23 September 2008	Round 3	Inverness Caledonian Thistle	Cappielow Park, Greenock	1 – 2 AET	Jim McAlister 34'	2,023	M McCurry

=== Challenge Cup ===
Date	Round	Opponents	Stadium	Result F – A	Scorers	Attendance	Referee
13 August 2008	Round 2	East Stirlingshire	Ochilview Park, Stenhousemuir	3–0	Steven Masterton 22'; Ryan McGuffie 32', 53'	753	S O'Reilly
7 September 2008	Quarter Final	Queen of the South	Palmerston Park, Dumfries	2–0	Brian Wake 48'; Ryan McGuffie 77'	2,991	W Collum
12 October 2008	Semi Final	Ross County	Victoria Park, Dingwall	1–4	Allan McManus (red card) 55'; Peter Weatherson 77'	1,396	M Tumilty

== Player statistics ==
=== Overall ===
#	Player	Played	Subs	Goal
GK	(Scotland) Kevin Cuthbert	34	0	0
GK	(Scotland) Colin Stewart	2	2	0
DF	(Scotland) Stewart Greacen	29	0	2
DF	(England) Dominic Shimmin	28	0	0
DF	(Scotland) Alex Walker	27	1	0
DF	(Scotland) Chris Smith	22	2	0
DF	(Scotland) Allan McManus	21	2	0
DF	(Scotland) Ryan Harding	12	2	1
DF	(Scotland) David MacGregor	11	0	0
DF	(Scotland) Alan Reid	0	2	0
MF	(Scotland) Jim McAlister	42	0	1
MF	(Scotland) Ryan McGuffie	38	1	8
MF	(Scotland) Steven Masterton	28	8	6
MF	(Scotland) Kevin Finlayson	27	11	0
MF	(Australia) Erik Paartalu	24	9	4
MF	(Scotland) Allan Jenkins	22	13	3
MF	(Scotland) Carlo Monti	3	1	1
FW	(England) Peter Weatherson	33	8	10
FW	(England) Brian Wake	25	15	12
FW	(Scotland) Iain Russell	17	15	7
FW	(Scotland) James Grady	16	5	2
FW	(England) Jon Newby	5	2	1

== League table ==
Pos	Team	Pld	W	D	L	GF	GA	GD	Pts	Promotion, qualification or relegation
4	Dundee	36	13	11	12	33	32	+1	50	
5	Queen of the South	36	12	11	13	57	50	+7	47	
6	Greenock Morton	36	12	11	13	40	40	0	47	
7	Livingston (R)	36	13	8	15	56	58	−2	47 (Note: Demoted to 3rd Division for Financial Irregularities)	Relegation to the Third Division
8	Ross County	36	13	8	15	42	46	−4	47	

Source: BBC Sport
Rules for classification: 1) points; 2) goal difference; 3) number of goals scored.
(R) Relegated
