= Colin Stewart (footballer) =

Scotland international footballer (born 1980)

Personal information
- Full name: Colin James Stewart
- Date of birth: 10 January 1980 (age 46)
- Place of birth: Middlesbrough, England
- Height: 6 ft 3 in (1.91 m)
- Position: Goalkeeper

Team information
- Current team: Liverpool (goalkeeping development coach)

Youth career
- Dreghorn Boys Club
- Kilmarnock
- 1996–1999: Ipswich Town

Senior career*
Years	Team	Apps	(Gls)
1999–2003	Kilmarnock	1	(0)
2000	→ Clydebank (loan)	4	(0)
2000	→ Alloa Athletic (loan)	16	(0)
2000–2001	→ Queen's Park (loan)	13	(0)
2001	→ Hamilton Academical (loan)	2	(0)
2001	→ Stranraer (loan)	1	(0)
2002	→ Queen's Park (loan)	16	(0)
2003–2005	Ross County	37	(0)
2005–2006	Partick Thistle	12	(0)
2006	Grindavik	1	(0)
2006–2008	Livingston	40	(0)
2008–2012	Greenock Morton	77	(0)
2013	Cowdenbeath	5	(0)
2013	Airdrieonians	3	(0)
2013–2014	Raith Rovers	2	(0)
Total		230	(0)

International career
2001	Scotland U21	1	(0)

Managerial career
- 2014: Kilwinning Rangers
- 2021: Rangers (caretaker)
- * Club domestic league appearances and goals

Colin James Stewart (born 10 January 1980) is a Scottish professional football coach and former goalkeeper who is currently goalkeeping development coach for Premier League club Liverpool. Born in England, he gained one U21 international cap for Scotland.

Stewart was co-manager at Kilwinning Rangers in the Scottish Junior Football Association, West Region.

== Early life ==
Stewart is the son of former Scotland goalkeeper Jim Stewart. Stewart was born in England when his father was playing for Middlesbrough. The Stewarts returned to Scotland later on that year, when Jim signed for Rangers.

== Playing career ==
=== Club ===
Stewart started his career with Scottish Premier League club Kilmarnock, but could not win the place as their starting goalkeeper. He was loaned out to a number of lower division clubs, namely Clydebank, Alloa Athletic, Queen's Park and Hamilton Academical. Since 2003 he has played more regularly, mainly at the First Division level. Stewart was first choice goalkeeper throughout the second half of season 2006–07 for First Division side Livingston, where he played the last dozen or so games after ousting Mariusz Liberda from the number one jersey. After being released by Livingston's new owners, Stewart signed for Division One rivals Morton in May 2008.

Stewart was originally expected to be the first choice goalkeeper for season 2008–09, however after a shaky début against Clyde at Broadwood on 2 August 2008, he was dropped for the former St Johnstone goalkeeper Kevin Cuthbert, who was listed as a trialist on the substitutes bench for that game. After this he spent most of his début season in the stand, with manager Davie Irons preferring to list youth players Kieran Cannon and Ryan McWilliams as the back-up goalkeepers to Cuthbert. Despite having a year left on his contract with Morton, he was told in May 2009 that he was free to find another club.

Since then he turned himself into the club's first choice goalkeeper, and signed a new contract in June 2010. He was released by the club in May 2012 and claimed that the signing of Alan Combe in March, after he sustained a broken toe, forced him to leave the club to find regular football elsewhere.

Stewart became a goalkeeping coach in Qatar, with Al-Khor Sports Club in August 2013. Stewart returned to Scotland during February 2013, playing three trial matches for Stranraer before signing for Cowdenbeath. After leaving Central Park, Stewart signed for Airdrieonians after a free transfer on 8 June 2013 and signed a one-year contract. On 27 August 2013, after the club's League Cup second round defeat at home to Livingston, Stewart had to be restrained by stewards as he argued with a fan as he headed up the tunnel at full-time. On 30 August 2013, Stewart departed the club by mutual consent.

On 9 November 2013, it was announced that Stewart had signed for Raith Rovers.

=== International ===
Stewart made one appearance for the Scotland U21 side keeping a clean sheet in a 1–0 victory over Latvia. Stewart now coaches the goalkeepers for the Scotland U15 side.

== Coaching career ==
Stewart was appointed as co-manager of Junior club Kilwinning Rangers in February 2014 alongside former Queen of the South and Ayr United player Chris Strain.

Stewart joined the Rangers F.C. Academy becoming the head of academy goalkeeping, before being promoted to first-team goalkeeping coach by Graeme Murty in 2017.

In July 2025, Stewart left Rangers to take up the role of goalkeeper development and pathway lead with Liverpool.

== Personal life ==
Stewart is married to women's football star Julie Fleeting. They have three daughters named Ella, Sophia and Matilda.

== See also ==
- Greenock Morton F.C. season 2008–09 | 2009–10 | 2010–11 | 2011–12
- Stranraer F.C. season 2012–13
- Cowdenbeath F.C. season 2012-13
- Raith Rovers F.C. season 2013–14
