= David MacGregor =

Scottish footballer (born 1981)

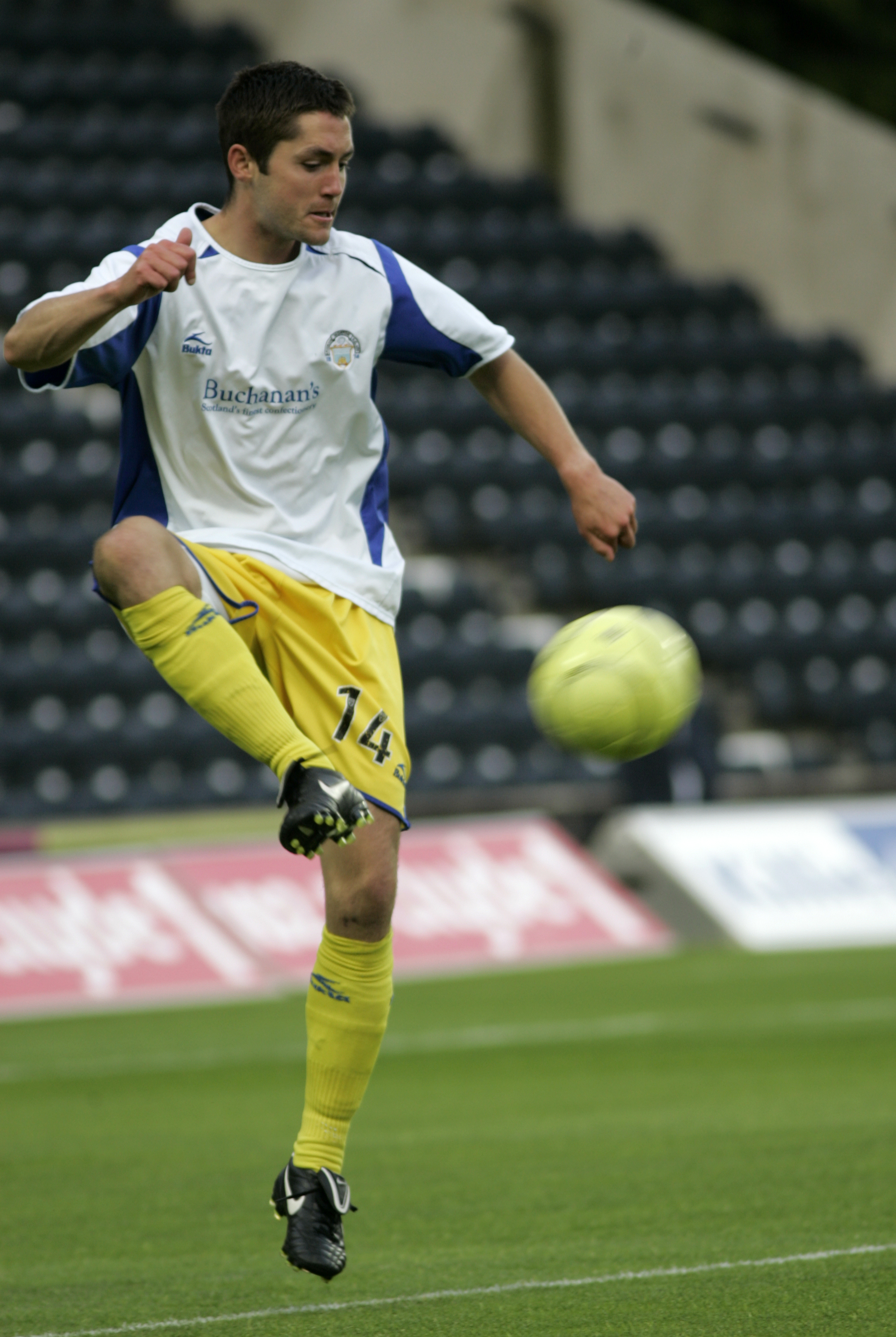
- MacGregor with Greenock Morton

Personal information
- Full name: David George MacGregor
- Date of birth: 9 June 1981 (age 45)
- Place of birth: Greenock, Scotland
- Height: 5 ft 11 in (1.80 m)
- Position: Defender

Team information
- Current team: Stranraer (U20s assistant manager)

Youth career
- 1995–1999: Greenock Morton

Senior career*
Years	Team	Apps	(Gls)
2000–2011	Greenock Morton	230	(5)
2011–2014	Stranraer	56	(0)
2014–2015	Queen's Park	18	(1)
- * Club domestic league appearances and goals

David MacGregor (born 9 June 1981) is a Scottish former footballer who is currently U20s assistant manager at Stranraer.

MacGregor started his career with home town club Greenock Morton at the age of 14, before moving to Stranraer in 2011, and finishing his career with Queen's Park.

== Playing career ==
=== Morton ===
At the end of the 2007–08 season, MacGregor required a hernia operation after the away game in April against St Johnstone. He was out after this operation he was out for approximately six months before making his return to the first team against Clyde in Morton's first win of the season on 18 October 2008.

Despite being injured for most of the 2008–09 season, MacGregor was given a contract extension by Davie Irons until August 2009 to prove his fitness ahead of the next season. After receiving the extension, which was until 15 August 2009, MacGregor managed to regain the ability to run in June 2009 ahead of the season to give him hope of gaining a contract extension for the rest of the season. On 17 August, MacGregor signed a new one-year deal to take him until the end of 2009–10 season.

As with the end of the previous season, at the end of the 2009–10 season MacGregor was again injured. He was offered the summer to prove his fitness, to see if he merited a contract extension under new manager Allan Moore. Once again he received a further year on 19 July 2010.

=== Stranraer ===
MacGregor was released by Morton in May 2011, and signed with Stranraer after playing in a couple of trial matches. After playing in seven league matches, MacGregor was signed until the end of the season. In June 2012, MacGregor signed another extension for a further season at Stair Park.

=== Queen's Park ===
On 27 June 2014, MacGregor signed for Scottish League Two club Queen's Park. On 28 July 2015, he left Queen's Park, the club agreeing to release him due to work commitments.

== Coaching career ==
In May 2017, MacGregor was appointed assistant to U20s manager Stuart Wild at Stranraer.

MacGregor is an assistant kitman at Rangers. During a UEFA Europa League match between Rangers and Manchester United at Old Trafford on 23 January 2025, MacGregor was shoved by Rasmus Højlund after he was involved in a touchline collision with Manchester United captain Bruno Fernandes.
