= James Grady (footballer) =

Scottish footballer (born 1971)

Personal information
- Date of birth: 14 March 1971 (age 55)
- Place of birth: Paisley, Scotland
- Position: Striker

Senior career*
Years	Team	Apps	(Gls)
–1994	Arthurlie		
1994–1997	Clydebank	108	(25)
1997–2000	Dundee	95	(23)
2000–2003	Ayr United	80	(14)
2003–2004	Partick Thistle	33	(15)
2004–2005	Dundee United	29	(2)
2005–2008	Gretna	62	(19)
2008–2009	Hamilton Academical	5	(1)
2008	→ Greenock Morton (loan)	10	(1)
2009–2010	Greenock Morton	17	(1)
Total		436	(101)

Managerial career
- 2009: Greenock Morton (caretaker)
- 2009–2010: Greenock Morton (player-manager)
- 2022–: Scotland under-16
- * Club domestic league appearances and goals

James Grady (born 14 March 1971) is a Scottish former professional footballer who spent the majority of his career in the top two divisions in Scottish football. He played as a striker, and became player-manager for Greenock Morton in the First Division between 2009 and 2010.

Grady started in the junior ranks with Barrhead side Arthurlie, before turning senior with Clydebank. After three seasons at Kilbowie, Grady got a move to Dundee, where stayed for another three seasons. Another spell of three seasons was spent at Ayr United, before a season at Partick Thistle.

He then played at Tannadice Park with Dundee United for a season before spending three years winning the First Division title with the ill-fated Gretna. A short spell at Hamilton Academical ended with a loan spell at Morton, which was turned permanent, before he was made the player-manager after Davie Irons was removed from his post.

== Playing career ==
Grady was born in Paisley. After a spell in junior football with Arthurlie, he moved to former senior outfit Clydebank, who now play junior before spending three seasons with Dundee. A further three years were spent with Ayr United, before a prolific season in the SPL with Partick Thistle saw him finish the top Scottish scorer with 15 goals.

An unproductive season with Dundee United followed, in which he scored just twice, but Grady rediscovered his scoring touch in 2005 with Gretna. On 28 April 2007, he scored an injury-time winner against Ross County to secure Gretna's promotion to the SPL as First Division champions.

He joined Hamilton Academical on 31 January 2008. Grady scored his first goal for the Accies against Queen of the South on 1 March. His only other goal for Accies was against Clyde in a 3–1 win in the Scottish League Cup.

Grady joined Greenock Morton on an emergency loan (up to 93 days) on 17 October 2008.

Grady scored on his debut for Morton, in a 1–0 home victory over Clyde on 18 October 2008, to give the Cappielow club their first league victory since beating Partick Thistle on the last day of the previous season. This goal was Grady's 100th league goal of his career.

Grady was released by Hamilton on 2 January 2009, and signed a permanent deal until the end of the season at Morton.

The Daily Record stated that Grady was offered a further contract until January 2010, via its Soccer Shorts section.

== Coaching career ==
After the sacking of Davie Irons, Grady was made caretaker manager of Greenock Morton alongside Allan McManus. They were appointed permanently (this time with McManus as his assistant) on Halloween 2009. He left Morton on 9 May 2010, after eight months in charge of the club.

As of 2018, Grady was the dedicated coach for the Scottish Football Association's Performance Schools project based at Grange Academy in Kilmarnock. He became coach of the Scotland under-16 team in February 2022.

== Career statistics ==
Appearances and goals by club, season and competition
Club	Season	League			Scottish Cup		Scottish League Cup		Continental		Total	
Club	Season	Division	Apps	Goals	Apps	Goals	Apps	Goals	Apps	Goals	Apps	Goals
Clydebank	1994–95	Scottish First Division	108	25							108	25
Clydebank	1995–96	Scottish First Division	108	25							108	25
Clydebank	1996–97	Scottish First Division	108	25							108	25
Dundee	1997–98	Scottish First Division	36	14	4	3	2	0	–		42	17
Dundee	1998–99	Scottish Premier League	26	3	1	0	1	0	–		28	3
Dundee	1999–2000	Scottish Premier League	31	6	1	0	2	1	–		34	7
Ayr United	2000–01	Scottish First Division	18	3	1	0	–		–		19	3
Ayr United	2001–02	Scottish First Division	31	8	5	2	5	2	–		41	12
Ayr United	2002–03	Scottish First Division	31	3	2	1	1	0	–		34	4
Partick Thistle	2003–04	Scottish Premier League	33	15	2	2	2	1	–		37	18
Dundee United	2004–05	Scottish Premier League	29	2	3	2	2	1	–		34	5
Gretna	2005–06	Scottish Second Division	31	15	6	6	2	1	–		39	22
Gretna	2006–07	Scottish First Division	23	4	1	0	–		2	0	26	4
Gretna	2007–08	Scottish Premier League	8	0	–		1	0	–		9	0
Hamilton Academical	2007–08	Scottish First Division	5	1	1	0	–		–		6	1
Greenock Morton	2008–09	Scottish First Division	21	2	–		–		–		21	2
Greenock Morton	2009–10	Scottish First Division	5	0	–		–		–		5	0
Career total			435	101	27	16	18	6	2	0	482	123

== Honours ==
Dundee

- Scottish First Division: 1997–98

Ayr United

- Scottish League Cup runner-up: 2001–02

Dundee United

- Scottish Cup runner-up: 2004–05

Gretna

- Scottish First Division: 2006–07
- Scottish Second Division: 2005–06
- Scottish Cup runner-up: 2005–06

Hamilton Academical

- Scottish First Division: 2007–08

== See also ==
- 2004–05 Dundee United F.C. season
- 2008–09 Greenock Morton F.C. season | 09–10
