= Alan Reid (Scottish footballer) =

Scottish footballer (born 1980)

Personal information
- Date of birth: 21 October 1980 (age 46)
- Place of birth: Paisley, Scotland
- Position: Full-back

Youth career
- Renfrew Victoria

Senior career*
Years	Team	Apps	(Gls)
1998–2005	Hibernian	36	(1)
1998	→ Queen's Park (loan)	7	(0)
1999	→ Queen's Park (loan)	1	(0)
2000	→ East Fife (loan)	2	(0)
2001	→ Greenock Morton (loan)	9	(2)
2005–2008	St Mirren	65	(0)
2007	→ Albion Rovers (loan)	4	(0)
2008	Greenock Morton (trial)	2	(0)
2009	Stenhousemuir	6	(0)
2009–2010	Greenock Morton	16	(0)
2011–2012	Queen of the South	28	(0)
- * Club domestic league appearances and goals

Alan Reid (born 21 October 1980 in Paisley) is a Scottish professional footballer who is currently without a club.

Reid started his senior career with Hibernian after joining from youth side Renfrew Victoria. He was loaned out four times to Queen's Park (twice), East Fife and Greenock Morton; before being released and signing for Morton's rivals St Mirren. Reid stayed at the Buddies for three years, with a short loan spell at Albion Rovers, before being released in 2008.

A further trial spell at Morton followed, before he signed for Stenhousemuir a year later, then he returned to Morton until the end of the 2009–10 season when he was released. He then played for Queen of the South.

== Career ==
Reid began his career with Hibernian. He played for Hibs in the 2004 Scottish League Cup final, which they lost 2–0 to Livingston. After being released by Hibs in 2005, Reid joined St Mirren and helped them win the First Division in 2005–06.

Reid started his career as a striker, playing there during a loan spell at Greenock Morton in 2001. After moving to St. Mirren he was moved to full-back.

In a bid to find regular football, Alan played in a trial match for Morton against Ayr United on 12 July 2008. He subsequently made two substitute appearances as a trialist in league games against Clyde and Airdrie United.

A deal with Morton did not materialise, however, and he appeared for Stenhousemuir later in the 2008–09 season. Reid, along with David van Zanten, appeared on trial for Morton against Partick Thistle in November 2009. After van Zanten signed, Reid continued on trial against Raith Rovers and Airdrie United. Reid signed permanently following the release of Ryan Harding in late November. He was released by Morton at the end of the 2009–10 season.

Queen of the South signed Reid on 22 July 2011. Reid had previously played under Queens manager Gus MacPherson at St Mirren. His QoS debut was on 23 July 2011 the extra time 2–0 defeat away at Ayr United in the 2011–12 Scottish Challenge Cup. He came on as a substitute for Craig Reid.

== Honours ==
- 2004 Scottish League Cup finalist
- 2005–06 Scottish Challenge Cup winner
- 2005–06 Scottish First Division winner

== See also ==
- 2008–09 Greenock Morton F.C. season | 09–10
