= Jim McAlister =

Scottish footballer

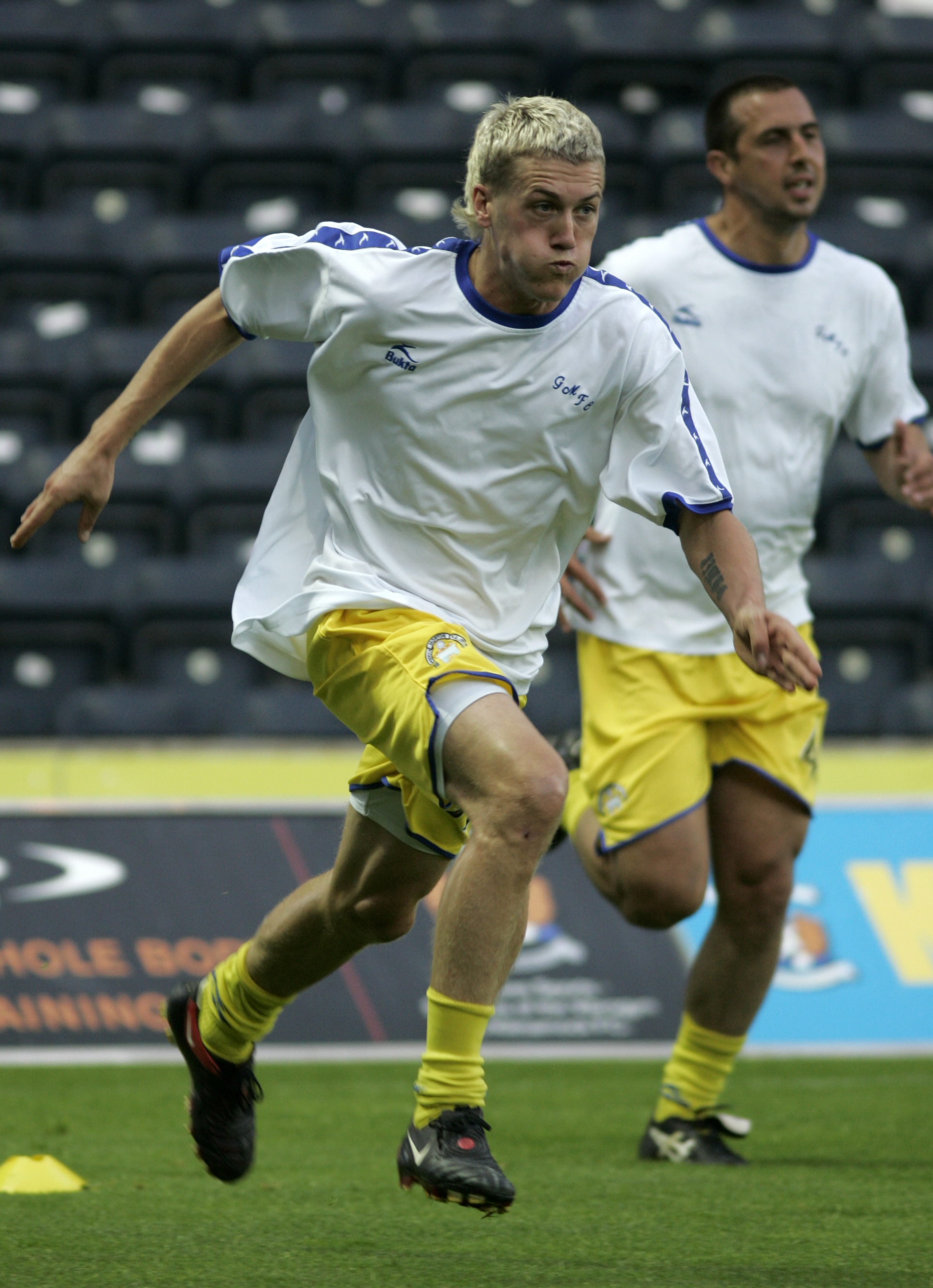

Personal information
- Full name: James Duncan McAlister
- Date of birth: 2 November 1985 (age 41)
- Place of birth: Rothesay, Scotland
- Position: Midfielder

Youth career
- Rothesay Brandane
- Everton BC
- Linwood Rangers
- 2002–2004: Greenock Morton

Senior career*
Years	Team	Apps	(Gls)
2002–2010	Greenock Morton	244	(16)
2010–2012	Hamilton Academical	55	(1)
2012–2015	Dundee	111	(9)
2015–2018	Blackpool	67	(0)
2018–2021	Greenock Morton	56	(3)
Total		533	(29)
- * Club domestic league appearances and goals

James Duncan McAlister (born 2 November 1985) is a Scottish retired footballer, who is most known for being club captain for Greenock Morton, making 361 appearances for the club.

Although predominantly right-footed, McAlister played on the left side of midfield in an eight-year first spell at Morton and was transformed into a right wing-back while at Hamilton Academical. At Dundee, he established himself as a central midfielder. After a three-year spell in English football with Blackpool, McAlister returned to Morton in 2018 and retired midway through the 2020–21 season.

== Playing career ==
=== Greenock Morton ===
McAlister was raised on the Isle of Bute and attended Rothesay Primary School and Rothesay Academy. He made his Greenock Morton debut as a substitute against Peterhead at Cappielow Park on 28 December 2002 at 17 years old. His first start was made a few months later on 15 February 2003 away at Elgin City as an attacker.

Over the next couple of seasons, McAlister flirted with Morton's first team while playing regularly for the reserve side. The manager John McCormack introduced McAlister to the first team as a result of his performances in the reserves. By season 2004–05 McAlister had forced his way into Morton's first team, and such were his performances that he went on to start in every league match that season, barring one in which he appeared as a substitute. As a result, he was offered a new three-year contract which he signed in July 2005.

Some of his performances led to comparisons with Barcelona player Ronaldinho and resulted in a number of fans giving him the tongue-in-cheek nickname 'Jimaldinho'.

McAlister started 107 consecutive league matches for Morton (including the two playoff games against Peterhead in 2006), with the last game he missed being a meaningless game against Forfar Athletic at the end of the 2005–2006 season. However, this run came to an end as he missed a game on 2 May 2009 due to suspension for accumulating five yellow cards.

On 21 July 2009, after a friendly loss to Romania's champions Unirea Urziceni, McAlister was approached by head coach Dan Petrescu to join Unirea, also offering him the chance to play in the UEFA Champions League. McAlister went on trial to Football League Championship side Watford in August 2009. Watford manager Malky Mackay told the club that they intended to keep an eye on McAlister over the weeks following the trial. He also attracted interest from Morton's rivals St Mirren, as claimed by the Greenock Telegraph towards the end of the January 2010 transfer window.

In April 2010, McAlister broke his foot in a 3–3 draw with Queen of the South.

=== Hamilton Academical ===
He was released by Morton at the end of the 2009–10 season, and joined Hamilton Academical. He played in the club's defeat in the 2012 Scottish Challenge Cup final, and scored his first and only goal for the Accies in a 5–1 loss at Ross County on 28 April 2012.

=== Dundee ===
After his release by Hamilton, McAlister went on trial at English side Carlisle United after being recommended by former boss at Morton, Davie Irons and then trained at his previous club Greenock Morton. In August 2012, he signed for Scottish Premier League side Dundee. He went on to be an almost ever-present in the Dundee midfield, playing 125 times, scoring 12 times.

=== Blackpool ===
McAlister signed with Blackpool on 29 July 2015 after playing three pre-season friendlies for them. He joined on a free transfer in a two-year deal with an option for a third year. He scored his first goal for Blackpool in a 4-2 EFL Cup win against Bolton Wanderers on 9 August 2016. It was confirmed that McAllister broke his leg in a 1–1 draw against Colchester United on 4 February 2017, ruling him out for the remainder of the season. He was released by Blackpool at the end of the 2017–18 season.

=== Greenock Morton ===
McAlister signed a one-year contract with Morton in June 2018. On 16 July, he was announced as club captain.

On 3 June 2019, McAlister signed a one-year extension, committing himself to the club until 10 June 2020.

McAlister retired from playing football in January 2021.

== Post-playing career ==
He joined Rangers in 2021 as a Kitman. He was promoted to chief Kitman following the sudden death of Jimmy Bell in May 2022.

McAlister left Rangers, before moving to Saudi Arabia with Steven Gerrard

McAlister is now the Kitman for the Scottish national team.

== Career statistics ==
=== Club ===
As of 8 February 2020

Club	Season	League			Cup		League Cup		Other		Total	
Club	Season	Division	Apps	Goals	Apps	Goals	Apps	Goals	Apps	Goals	Apps	Goals
Greenock Morton	2002–03	Scottish Third Division	7	0	2	0	0	0	0	0	9	0
Greenock Morton	2003–04	Scottish Second Division	9	0	0	0	0	0	0	0	9	0
Greenock Morton	2004–05	Scottish Second Division	36	2	3	0	2	0	1	0	42	2
Greenock Morton	2005–06	Scottish Second Division	35	4	2	0	1	0	6	0	44	4
Greenock Morton	2006–07	Scottish Second Division	36	5	3	0	1	0	4	0	44	5
Greenock Morton	2007–08	Scottish First Division	36	4	4	1	1	0	4	1	45	6
Greenock Morton	2008–09	Scottish First Division	35	0	1	0	3	1	3	0	42	1
Greenock Morton	2009–10	Scottish First Division	30	1	3	0	2	0	2	0	37	1
Greenock Morton	Total		224	16	18	1	10	1	20	1	272	19
Hamilton Academical	2010–11	Scottish Premier League	19	0	2	0	1	0	0	0	22	0
Hamilton Academical	2011–12	Scottish First Division	36	1	2	0	1	0	5	0	44	1
Hamilton Academical	Total		55	1	4	0	2	0	5	0	66	1
Dundee	2012–13	Scottish Premier League	38	3	3	2	1	0	0	0	42	5
Dundee	2013–14	Scottish Championship	36	4	1	0	2	1	3	0	42	5
Dundee	2014–15	Scottish Premiership	37	2	2	0	2	0	0	0	41	2
Dundee	Total		111	9	6	2	5	1	3	0	125	12
Blackpool	2015–16	League One	44	0	0	0	1	0	1 (Note: Appearances in the Football League Trophy)	0	46	0
Blackpool	2016–17	League Two	22	0	5	0	2	1	3	0	32	1
Blackpool	2017–18	League One	1	0	0	0	0	0	1	0	2	0
Blackpool	Total		67	0	5	0	3	1	5	0	80	1
Greenock Morton	2018–19	Scottish Championship	33	0	3	0	4	0	0	0	40	0
Greenock Morton	2019–20	Scottish Championship	23	3	3	0	5	0	0	0	31	3
Greenock Morton	Total		56	3	6	0	9	0	0	0	71	3
Career total			513	29	39	3	29	3	33	1	614	36

== Honours ==
Greenock Morton

- Scottish Third Division: 2002–03
- Scottish Second Division: 2006–07

Hamilton Academical

- Scottish Challenge Cup Runner-Up: 2012

Dundee

- Scottish Championship: 2013–14

Blackpool

- League Two Promotion: 2016–17

== See also ==
- 2008–09 Greenock Morton F.C. season
- 2009–10 Greenock Morton F.C. season
