= Ryan McGuffie =

Scottish footballer (born 1980)

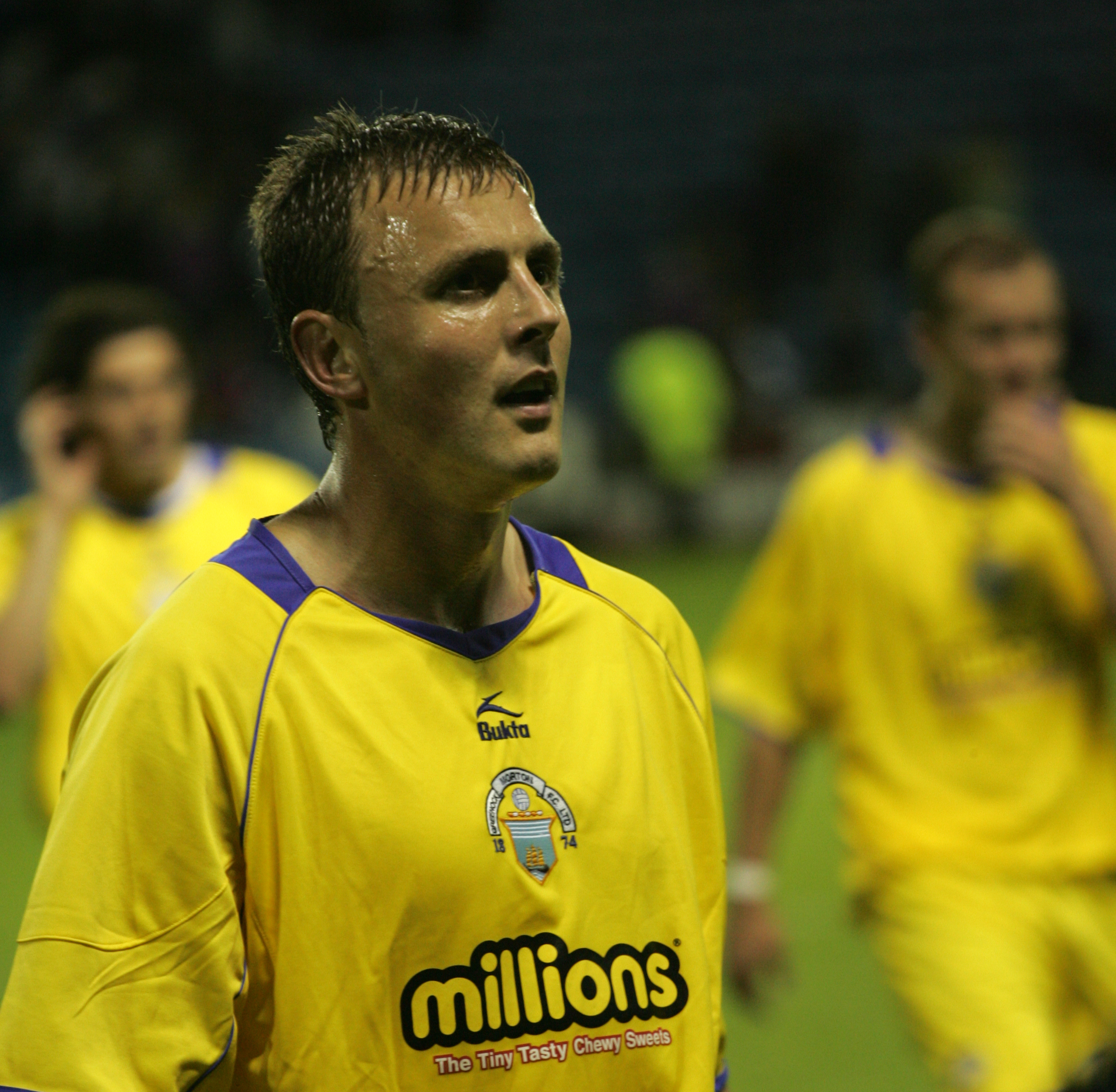

Personal information
- Date of birth: 22 July 1980 (age 46)
- Place of birth: Dumfries, Scotland
- Positions: Defender; midfielder

Youth career
- St Johnstone
- –1998: Annan Athletic

Senior career*
Years	Team	Apps	(Gls)
1998–1999	Queen's Park	12	(1)
1999–2001	Annan Athletic	52	(18)
2001–2002	Newcastle United	0	(0)
2002–2008	Gretna	185	(32)
2008–2010	Greenock Morton	98	(12)
2010–2014	Queen of the South	102	(19)
2014–2019	St Albans Saints	118	(23)
Total		567	(105)
- * Club domestic league appearances and goals

Ryan McGuffie (born 22 July 1980) is a Scottish former professional footballer who last played for Australian club St Albans Saints. McGuffie is a utility player who can line up in either defence or midfield.

== Career ==
=== Early career ===
Ryan McGuffie played two trial matches for home town club Queen of the South during the pre season of 2002–03. McGuffie started at home versus Barnsley and appeared as a substitute away to Southport. His brother Russell played one league match for Queens in 1999. Russell signed for Queens through the club's youth set-up.

=== Gretna ===
McGuffie played for Gretna and scored Gretna's goal in the 2006 Scottish Cup Final against Heart of Midlothian. He scored from a rebound after having his penalty kick saved by Craig Gordon. This qualified Gretna for European competition for the first time ever. However they were hammered 5–1 at home by Derry City in the UEFA Cup, McGuffie scoring Gretna's goal.

He guested for Shamrock Rovers in a friendly against Hibernian in July 2005.

=== Greenock Morton ===
In the January transfer window of the 2007–08 season McGuffie made the move from Gretna to Scottish Football League Second Division champions Greenock Morton where he scored on his debut match against Stirling Albion. McGuffie would soon be joined by his manager Davie Irons, assistant manager Derek Collins and a host of his former teammates as Gretna played out their final days in the Scottish Premier League.

He started the first six weeks of the 2008–09 season extremely well as he scored five goals in the Greenock club's assault in the cup competitions.

=== Queen of the South ===
McGuffie was announced as having signed a one-year contract with hometown club Queen of the South on the club website on 18 May 2010. After playing in Queens pre season games he scored on his competitive debut, a Challenge Cup first round 2–1 win against Albion Rovers on 24 July 2010, which was Queens first competitive match that season. His first league goal came on 22 August 2010, in the 3–1 win at Cowdenbeath. He played in the 2010 Scottish Challenge Cup Final 2–0 defeat to Ross County.

McGuffie re-signed for Queens on 19 July 2011 for season 2011–12. At the turn of the year he took on the role of penalty taker scoring against Hamilton on 2 January 2012 and again on 21 January against Livingston. He scored with another penalty on 14 February 2012 in the Scottish Cup last 16 replay at home against Aberdeen.

On 15 February 2014, it was announced that McGuffie had been released from his contract at his own request in order to move to Australia and sign for St Albans Saints where he scored two on his debut game against Springvale White Eagles.

== Honours ==
Gretna:-

- Scottish Football League Third Division 2004–05
- Scottish Football League Second Division 2005–06
- Scottish Football League First Division 2006–07
- 2006 Scottish Cup Final Runner-up

Queen of the South:-

- 2010 Scottish Challenge Cup Final Runner-up
- Scottish Football League Second Division 2012–13
- 2013 Scottish Challenge Cup Final Winner

== See also ==
- 2008–09 Greenock Morton F.C. season | 09-10
