= Kevin Finlayson =

Scottish footballer

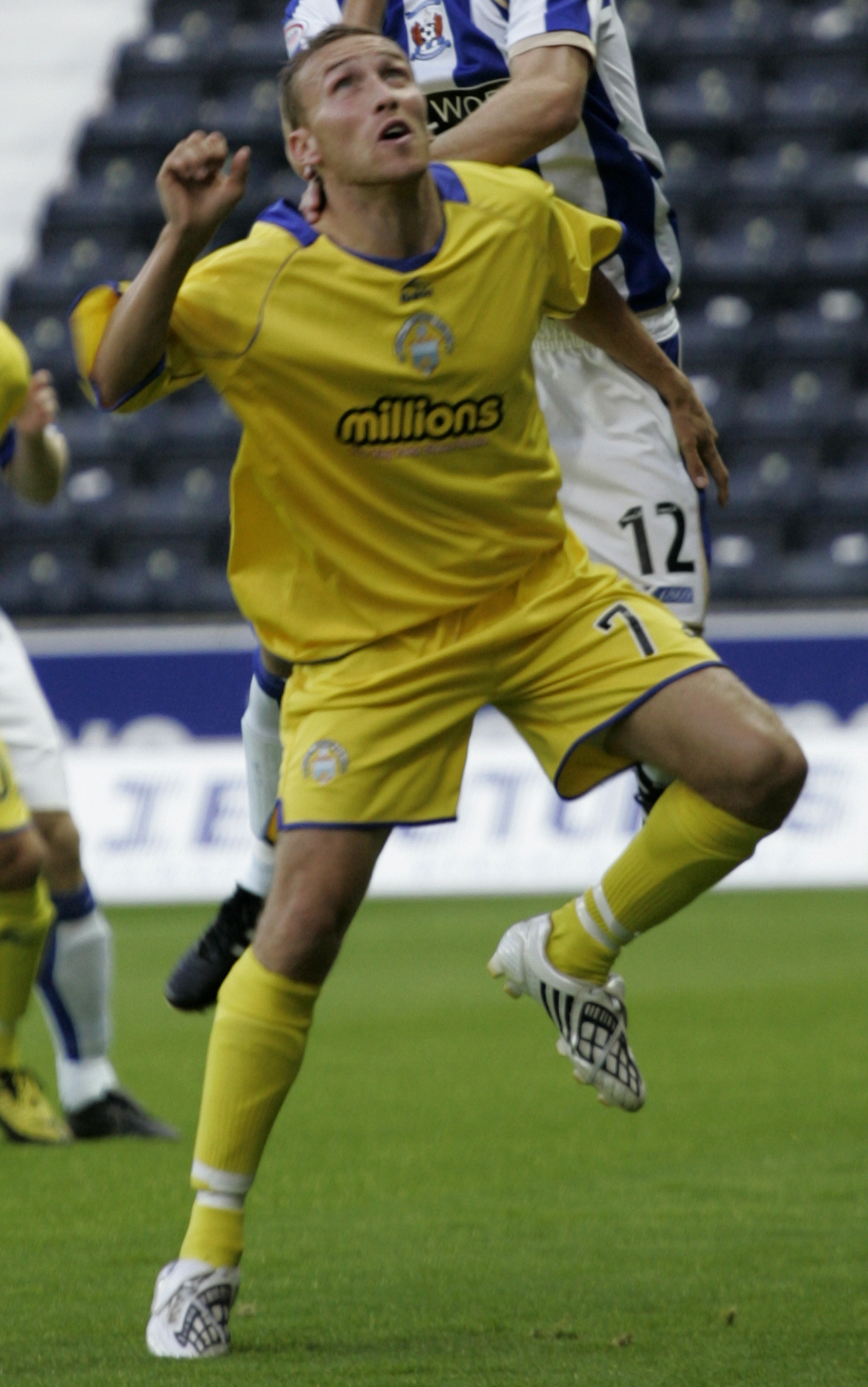

Personal information
- Full name: Kevin Charles Finlayson
- Date of birth: 7 December 1979 (age 46)
- Place of birth: Glasgow, Scotland
- Positions: Right wing-back; winger

Team information
- Current team: Kirkintilloch Rob Roy (assistant)

Youth career
- –1997: Queen's Park B.C.

Senior career*
Years	Team	Apps	(Gls)
1997–1999	Queen's Park	51	(8)
1999–2000	Ross County	11	(0)
2000	→ Queen's Park (loan)	10	(1)
2000–2001	Queen's Park	33	(3)
2001–2005	Stranraer	130	(26)
2005–2010	Greenock Morton	159	(4)
2010–2011	Clyde	31	(2)
2011	Kirkintilloch Rob Roy	2	(0)
2014–2016	Kitsap Pumas	?	(?)
2016–	Kirkintilloch Rob Roy	9	(0)
- * Club domestic league appearances and goals as of 3 September 2018

Kevin Charles Finlayson (born 7 December 1979 in Glasgow) is a Scottish former footballer that is assistant manager for Kirkintilloch Rob Roy.

Throughout his career he played for five clubs in the Scottish Football League, before turning Junior in 2011 and having a two-year spell in the US with Kitsap Pumas between 2014 and 2016.

== Career ==
Finlayson started his career at Queen's Park where he progressed from the Boys club through to become a regular in the first team playing over 50 games before turning professional with Ross County.

Only playing about a dozen games with the Staggies, Finlayson was loaned back to Queen's Park before re-signing for them permanently in 2000.

After leaving the Spiders, he signed for Stranraer where he played well over 100 times as a right Winger/forward.

After helping Stranraer to promotion at the expense of Greenock Morton, he signed for the Cappielow club on a Bosman free transfer on 31 May 2005, signing along with 3 others (Andy McLaren, Derek Lilley and Alex Walker).

During his five years at Cappielow, Finlayson featured in a variety of roles, including right back, right wing back, right midfield, centre midfield, left midfield and up front.

He was released by Morton at the end of the 2009–10 season, and subsequently signed for Clyde. He made 35 appearances in all competitions for the Bully Wee, before leaving the club in May 2011, after turning down a new contract.

== Honours ==
Greenock Morton

- Scottish Second Division: 2006–07

Stranraer

- Scottish Third Division: 2003–04

Queen's Park

- Scottish Third Division: 1999–2000

Kirkintilloch Rob Roy

- Central Sectional League Cup: 2016-17

== See also ==
- 2008–09 Greenock Morton F.C. season | 2009–10
