= Chris Smith (footballer, born 1988) =

Scottish footballer

Personal information
- Full name: Chris Smith
- Date of birth: 31 August 1988 (age 38)
- Place of birth: Glasgow, Scotland
- Height: 6 ft 0 in (1.83 m)
- Position: Defender

Youth career
- Partick Thistle
- Rangers

Senior career*
Years	Team	Apps	(Gls)
2008–2009	Greenock Morton	20	(0)
2009–2010	Dumbarton	34	(0)
2010–2012	Ayr United	64	(2)
2012–2013	Falkirk	6	(0)
2013	→ Ayr United (loan)	14	(0)
2013–2015	Stirling Albion	50	(2)
2015–2017	Clyde	64	(6)
Total		252	(10)
- * Club domestic league appearances and goals

Chris "Junior" Smith (born 31 August 1988 in Glasgow) is a Scottish footballer who plays as a defender.

Smith started his career in the youth teams of Partick Thistle and Rangers before making his first senior appearances in the Scottish Football League with Greenock Morton. He also played for Dumbarton, Ayr United, Falkirk, Stirling Albion and Clyde.

== Career ==
=== Rangers ===
Smith began his footballing career as a youth at Partick Thistle as a YTS, before moving on to SPL side Rangers. Chris was released by Rangers under-19s at the end of the 2007–08 season.

=== Morton ===
Smith went on trial at Greenock Morton and played in several trial matches, before he was eventually signed on 5 September 2008.

Smith made his league debut against QOS on 13 September 2008, at Palmerston Park, Dumfries, and his full debut the week previously in the Challenge Cup quarter-final against the same opposition. In his first four league games, he played as the left-back in a back four, alongside Ryan Harding, Dominic Shimmin and Alex Walker.

At the beginning of 2009, Smith was given a contract extension until the end the season. This was despite his howler against Airdrie United a few days earlier, which saw him axed from the first team squad against Partick Thistle on 30 December. Smith was released in May 2009, after being dropped for the last month of the season. After his release from Cappielow, Smith went on trial at Conference Premier club Wrexham.

=== Dumbarton ===
On 3 August 2009, Smith signed for Dumbarton.

=== Ayr United ===
In 2010, Chris Smith left Dumbarton, to join fellow Second Division club, Ayr United. In the 2010–11 season, Smith scored only once, away to Alloa Athletic, United lost 4–1. In the following season Smith scored two goals: The winner against St Mirren in the Quarter-Finals of the League Cup at St Mirren Park and the winner only four days later in a 3–2 victory for Ayr United against Hamilton Academical at New Douglas Park in the League.

=== Falkirk ===
In June 2012, Smith signed for Falkirk after Ayr United were relegated to the Second Division.

In February 2013, Smith had re-signed for Ayr United on loan, after only featuring for Falkirk six times since joining in June, the last away to Dumbarton in October.

=== Stirling Albion ===
Smith first played 45 minutes for The Binos in a 2–0 friendly win against Airdrieonians. The following Saturday, he played the full game against former club Falkirk, a match which ended in a 1–1 draw. On the same day, Stiring Albion announced that Smith had signed a one-year contract that would keep him at the Forthbank Stadium until at least June 2014.

=== Clyde ===
Smith agreed a one-year contract with Clyde. He made his debut for clyde against Livingston in the Scottish Cup getting beat 2–1 away. 1 Aug 2015 he made his league debut in a 1–0 away win against his former club Stirling Albion. Smith scored his first goal for Clyde against Arbroath the winner in a 1–0 win in Angus. He was voted fans player of the season 2015–16. Smith was released by Clyde in June 2017.
