= Kevin Cuthbert =

Scottish footballer

Personal information
- Date of birth: 8 September 1982 (age 44)
- Place of birth: Perth, Scotland
- Position: Goalkeeper

Youth career
- 1998–2001: St Johnstone

Senior career*
Years	Team	Apps	(Gls)
2001–2008	St Johnstone	110	(0)
2008–2011	Greenock Morton	49	(0)
2011–2012	Ayr United	35	(0)
2012–2014	Hamilton Academical	70	(0)
2014–2018	Raith Rovers	60	(0)
Total		324	(0)

Managerial career
- 2018: Raith Rovers (caretaker)
- * Club domestic league appearances and goals

Kevin Cuthbert (born 8 September 1982) is a Scottish former footballer who played as a goalkeeper. Cuthbert started his career at St Johnstone, where he played from 1998 until leaving a decade later. He later played for Greenock Morton, Ayr United, Hamilton Academical and Raith Rovers.

In 2018, he became caretaker manager of Raith Rovers, his only managerial stint to date.

== Career ==
=== St Johnstone ===
Born in Perth, Cuthbert made his St Johnstone debut in September 2001 after an injury to Alan Main. He remained in goal for the following two games, after which Main returned only to break his leg. Instead of turning to Cuthbert again, then-manager Sandy Clark brought in Alan Miller on loan from Blackburn Rovers as cover. Later that same season, in which St Johnstone lost their Scottish Premier League status, Cuthbert was given a seven-game run of starts.

Cuthbert started the 2002–03 season between the goalposts but lost it for a three-month spell after Main had recovered from his broken limb. Main however, was sold to Livingston and the management at St Johnstone then brought in Craig Nelson during the 2003–04 season to replace the gap left by Main. However Cuthbert's performances kept him in favour for all but seven games. When John Connolly brought in Rangers' young goalkeeper Allan McGregor on loan in 2004–05, Cuthbert had to settle for a place on the bench for the majority of the season.

For the first part of the 2006–07 season, Owen Coyle opted to go with new signing Bryn Halliwell. Cuthbert's hopes of challenging the Englishman for the starting jersey were set back after the former broke his finger in training, an injury that required surgery. He returned to action in the new year, making his first start in a 2–1 win over Clyde on Boxing Day. On 31 March 2007, Cuthbert was given a straight red card in a 2–1 loss to Livingston at McDiarmid Park, resulting in his missing two out of St Johnstone's four remaining league games.

=== Greenock Morton ===
In May 2008, after ten years at McDiarmid Park, Cuthbert did not renew his contract with the club. Cuthbert went on trial at Queens before he joined Greenock Morton in August 2008. On 27 December 2008, Cuthbert received the second straight red card of his career when against Airdrie United following a poor back pass by Chris Smith he brought down the attacker (Simon Lynch), to conceded a penalty in a game Morton lost 1–0 at Almondvale Stadium. Cuthbert despite playing almost every game in the 2008–2009 season, found that Morton's first contract offer to be of an unacceptable nature. Towards the end of May, Cuthbert was tied down to a new two-year contract. He was released in May 2011, after the club had secured their First Division status for the next season.

=== Ayr United ===
After his release by Morton, Cuthbert signed for newly promoted Ayr United, whom he had been linked with in January.

=== Hamilton Academical ===
On 1 July 2012, Cuthbert signed for Hamilton Academical on a one-year deal. In August 2013, Cuthbert played his 300th first team game in a 1–0 Scottish League Cup victory over Kilmarnock. Cuthbert helped Hamilton gain promotion to the Scottish Premiership in 2013–14, but then turned down an offer of a new contract with the club.

=== Raith Rovers ===
Cuthbert signed for Raith Rovers in June 2014. He played his 400th game on 15 October 2016 in a 0–0 draw against Hibernian. A persistent groin injury forced Cuthbert to retire from playing in February 2018.

== Coaching career ==
After he retired as a player, Cuthbert became a coach at Raith Rovers. He took caretaker charge of the team in September 2018, after Barry Smith resigned.

== Career statistics ==
As of match played 4 November 2017

Appearances and goals by club, season and competition
Club	Season	League			Scottish Cup		League Cup		Other		Total	
Club	Season	Division	Apps	Goals	Apps	Goals	Apps	Goals	Apps	Goals	Apps	Goals
St Johnstone	2001–02	Premier League	12	0	0	0	2	0	—		14	0
St Johnstone	2002–03	First Division	22	0	2	0	1	0	2 (Note: Appearances in the Scottish Challenge Cup)	0	27	0
St Johnstone	2003–04	First Division	29	0	0	0	4	0	2	0	35	0
St Johnstone	2004–05	First Division	5	0	1	0	0	0	1	0	7	0
St Johnstone	2005–06	First Division	23	0	1	0	1	0	4	0	29	0
St Johnstone	2006–07	First Division	17	0	5	0	1	0	3	0	26	0
St Johnstone	2007–08	First Division	2	0	0	0	0	0	3	0	5	0
St Johnstone	St Johnstone total		110	0	9	0	9	0	15	0	143	0
Greenock Morton	2008–09	First Division	34	0	1	0	3	0	2	0	40	0
Greenock Morton	2009–10	First Division	5	0	0	0	0	0	0	0	5	0
Greenock Morton	2010–11	First Division	10	0	0	0	1	0	0	0	11	0
Greenock Morton	Morton total		49	0	1	0	4	0	2	0	56	0
Ayr United	2011–12	First Division	35	0	3	0	5	0	1	0	44	0
Hamilton Academical	2012–13	First Division	36	0	3	0	3	0	0	0	42	0
Hamilton Academical	2013–14	Championship	34	0	1	0	3	0	5 (Note: One appearance in the Scottish Challenge Cup and four in the Premiership play-offs)	0	43	0
Hamilton Academical	Hamilton total		70	0	4	0	6	0	5	0	85	0
Raith Rovers	2014–15	Championship	7	0	0	0	2	0	1	0	10	0
Raith Rovers	2015–16	Championship	36	0	2	0	3	0	4 (Note: Two appearances in the Scottish Challenge Cup and two in the Premiership play-offs)	0	45	0
Raith Rovers	2016–17	Championship	17	0	2	0	4	0	0	0	23	0
Raith Rovers	2017–18	League One	0	0	0	0	0	0	0	0	0	0
Raith Rovers	Raith rovers total		60	0	4	0	9	0	5	0	78	0
Career total			324	0	21	0	33	0	28	0	406	0

== See also ==
- Greenock Morton F.C. season 2008–09 | 2009–10 | 2010–11

== Honours ==
St Johnstone

- Scottish Challenge Cup: 2007–08
