= Ryan McWilliams =

Scottish footballer

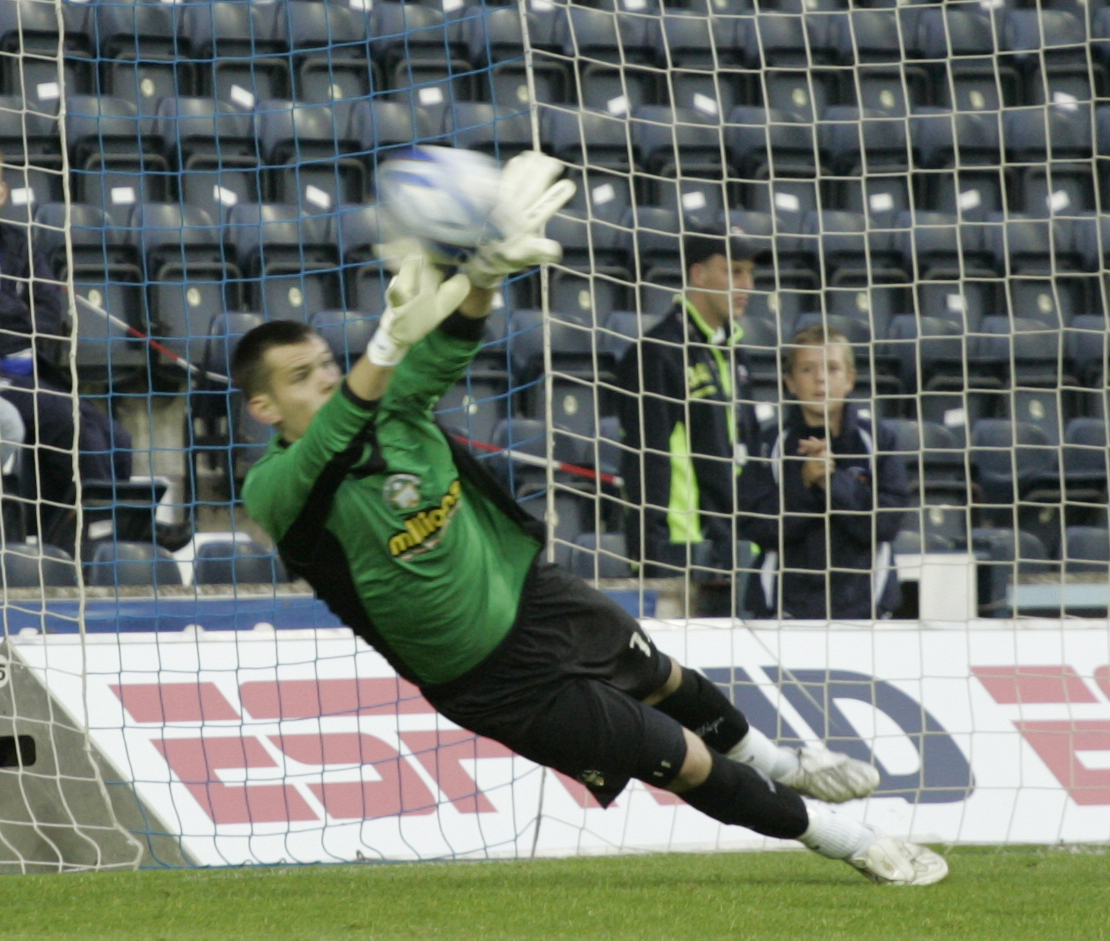
- McWilliams playing for Greenock Morton in 2009

Personal information
- Date of birth: 24 November 1989 (age 36)
- Place of birth: Greenock, Scotland
- Position: Goalkeeper

Team information
- Current team: Saltcoats Victoria

Youth career
- Largs Thistle
- –2009: Greenock Morton

Senior career*
Years	Team	Apps	(Gls)
2009–2010	Greenock Morton	4	(0)
2010	→ Largs Thistle (loan)	8	(0)
2010–2012	Ayr United	3	(0)
2012–2013	Albion Rovers	4	(0)
2012	→ East Stirlingshire (loan)	5	(0)
2013–2014	Largs Thistle	13	(0)
2014–2018	Greenock Juniors	138	(0)
2018–	Lesmahagow Juniors	4	(0)
2018–2021	Benburb	35	(0)
2021–2022	St.Peters	14	(0)
2022	Greenock Juniors	?	(0)
2022-	Saltcoats Victoria	16	(0)
Total		244	(0)
- * Club domestic league appearances and goals as of 10 March 2023

Ryan McWilliams (born 24 November 1989) is a Scottish footballer who plays for Saltcoats Victoria as a goalkeeper.

== Career ==
Born in Greenock, McWilliams began his career at Greenock Morton. He worked his way through the youth system to the Under-19s and then was called up to the first team. On 15 August 2009, he made his professional debut in a game against Dunfermline Athletic.

McWilliams made his debut for Morton on 15 August 2009, against Dunfermline Athletic after Bryn Halliwell was injured in the warm-up.

McWilliams was loaned to his old club, Ayrshire junior side, Largs Thistle towards the end of the 2009–10 season.

After being released by Morton, on 30 July 2010, Ryan signed for Ayr United on a 1-year deal as back up to David Crawford. At the end of the 2010–11 season, McWilliams signed a one-year extension with Ayr, but left at the end of the 2011–12 season.

McWilliams signed a one-year contract with the Second Division outfit Albion Rovers, then immediately after Rovers played against Morton in the Challenge Cup he was loaned out to East Stirlingshire on a 6-month deal, with his first game ironically to be against Morton. He asked to be released from his contract with Rovers in January 2013, after falling to third choice at the club.

East Stirlingshire traveled to play Rangers on 18 August 2012, where McWilliams earned the Man of the Match award after several point blank and double saves; these helped keep the score respectable as the Shire lost 5–1. He was recalled by Albion after an injury to Chris McCluskey.

McWilliams also coached the goalkeepers at youth level for Morton.

After his release by Albion Rovers, McWilliams returned to first club Largs Thistle. After leaving Largs, he moved to Greenock Juniors. After four seasons with his home club, Ryan signed a one-year deal with South Lanarkshire outfit Lesmahagow Juniors for season 2018–19.

Ryan decided to leave Lesmahagow and signed a deal with Govan-based side Benburb until the end of season 2018–2019.

After narrowly missing out on the West Region Championship Ryan continued his stay at Benburb until the summer of 2021 when he decided to leave due to injury.

Ryan then moved on to newly formed West of Scotland Football League 4th division Paisley based side St.Peters. Ryan played a handful of games during this season but due to injury they were limited. After a solitary season, Ryan decided to return to hometown club Greenock Juniors.

Ryan is now currently out on loan until Christmas at Ayrshire outfit Saltcoats Victoria.

Ryan then signed permanently with Saltcoats Victoria until the end of the season.

== See also ==
- Greenock Morton F.C. season 2009-10
