= Stewart Greacen =

Scottish footballer

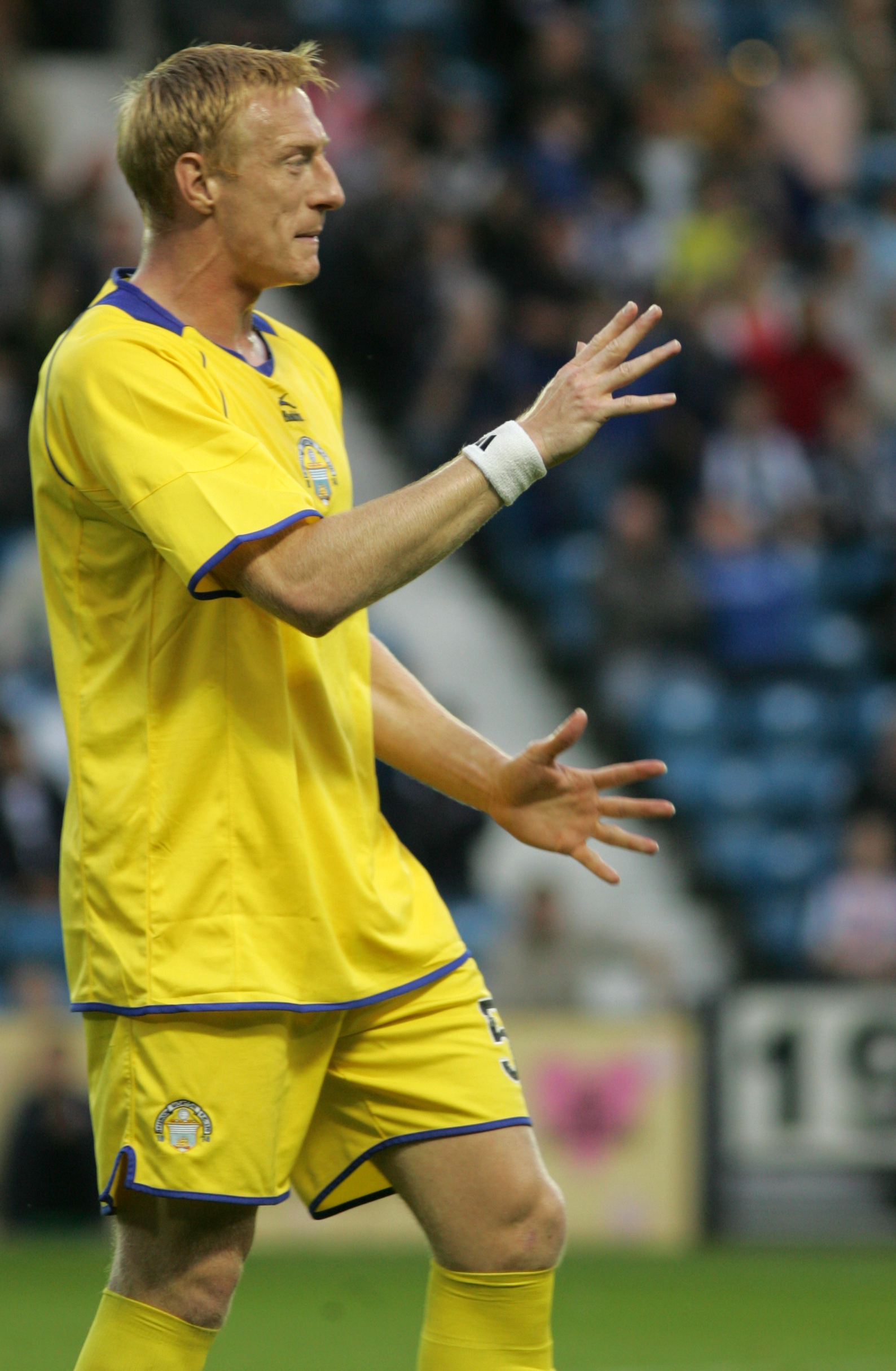

Personal information
- Date of birth: 31 March 1982 (age 44)
- Place of birth: Lanark, Scotland
- Position: Centre back

Youth career
- –1998: Rangers

Senior career*
Years	Team	Apps	(Gls)
1998–2000	Airdrieonians	3	(0)
2000–2003	Livingston	0	(0)
2000	→ Queen of the South (loan)	3	(0)
2001–2002	→ Greenock Morton (loan)	15	(0)
2003	Forfar Athletic	17	(1)
2003–2010	Greenock Morton	221	(18)
2011	Dundee (trial)	1	(0)
2011–2012	Derry City	47	(2)
2012	Glentoran	2	(0)
2013	Derry City	12	(0)
2014–2015	Stenhousemuir	29	(1)
Total		350	(22)
Medal record
Greenock Morton
Winner	Second Division	2006–07
- * Club domestic league appearances and goals

Stewart Greacen (born 31 March 1982) is a Scottish retired footballer who played as a central defender.

Greacen started his career as a youth player with Rangers, before making his first competitive appearances with Airdrieonians. Following only three league games, he was signed by the at-the-time Scottish Premier League side Livingston where he spent most of his time on loan at Queen of the South and Morton.

After leaving Livingston, he played for Forfar Athletic before moving on to become captain at Morton where he had previously been on loan.

== Career ==
Born in Lanark, Greacen began his senior career at now defunct Airdrieonians and from there he moved to Livingston. Livingston then sent him on loan to Queen of the South and Greenock Morton, where he played in the team that was relegated from the Scottish Second Division in the 2001–02 season. Livingston released Greacen in 2003 and he was immediately signed by Forfar Athletic. He played the second half of the 2002–03 season at Forfar on a short-term contract. At the end of the season Forfar offered Greacen a long-term deal which he rejected in favour of a deal at Morton. The main reason for this was that Morton offered a full-time contract in comparison to Forfar's part-time contract.

Greacen plays at centre back in the Morton defence. He is a tall commanding defender with a strong physical presence. He is good in the air and this helps in both an attacking and defensive way as he often scores from headers at set pieces. At 24 years old, Greacen became Greenock Morton's captain.

In May 2008, it was announced that Greacen had rejected a new contract from Morton and was being tracked by rival Scottish First Division sides Dunfermline Athletic, Queen of the South and Livingston.

Greacen was Morton's Player of the Year for 2008–2009.

On 22 December 2010, Greacen was released by Morton after nearly 250 appearances over two spells from the club.

He was on trial at Dundee, where he was eligible to play in a maximum of three league games – he however could not be signed due to their current transfer embargo.

He, therefore, chose the safe option of playing in the Airtricity Premier League with championship favourites Derry City hoping to gain a move to a bigger club in the summer.

He linked up Glentoran on 21 December 2011 but was released from his contract at the end of January 2012 as he wished to play full-time football again and has found the travelling from Scotland and not being able to train with the Glentoran squad an issue. He then joined up again with former club Derry City for training, admitting that he was in talks to sign a new contract. He subsequently rejoined them.

At the end of the 2014–15 season it was announced that due to an ongoing knee injury, Greacen would leave Stenhousemuir and retire from professional football.

== Honours ==
Greenock Morton

- Scottish Football League Second Division (1): 2006–07

Derry City

- League of Ireland Cup (1): 2011
- FAI Cup (1): 2012

Sporting positions
Preceded by Stuart McCluskey	Greenock Morton captain 2004–2010	Succeeded by Stuart McCaffrey

== See also ==
- Greenock Morton F.C. season 2008-09 | 2009–10 | 2010–11
