= David van Zanten =

Irish footballer (born 1982)

Personal information
- Date of birth: 8 May 1982 (age 44)
- Place of birth: Dublin, Ireland
- Position: Right-back

Youth career
- 1998–1999: Tolka Rovers
- 1999–2003: Celtic

Senior career*
Years	Team	Apps	(Gls)
2003–2008	St Mirren	196	(7)
2008–2009	Hibernian	34	(0)
2009	Greenock Morton	6	(1)
2010	Hamilton Academical	6	(0)
2010–2014	St Mirren	136	(1)
2014–2015	Dumbarton	19	(0)
2015–2016	Airdrieonians	9	(0)
Total		406	(9)
- * Club domestic league appearances and goals

David van Zanten (born 8 May 1982) is an Irish former professional footballer who played as a right-back.

Van Zanten was born in Ireland to a Dutch father and an Irish mother. Despite being born in Ireland, van Zanten has played his entire senior career in Scotland after signing for Celtic in 1999 from Tolka Rovers. After leaving Celtic at the age of 21, van Zanten signed for St Mirren; he made almost 200 appearances for the Paisley side. He subsequently played for Hibernian, Greenock Morton and Hamilton Academical, before returning to St Mirren in 2010. He made over 130 appearances in his second spell with the Buddies, before moving on to Dumbarton and then Airdrieonians.

== Career ==
=== Early career ===
Born in Dublin, van Zanten began his career with Tolka Rovers before joining Celtic in 1999. He spent three seasons with Celtic but failed to make any first team appearances and he was freed in 2003.

Van Zanten joined St Mirren after impressing their manager John Coughlin in a trial match at Easter Road. He helped St Mirren win promotion to the Scottish Premier League in 2006.

=== Hibernian and Morton ===
On 6 May 2008 it was reported by the Glasgow Evening Times that van Zanten had made a pre-contract agreement to sign for SPL rivals Hibernian in the summer of 2008. Van Zanten struggled for form during his first season with Hibs, and was frequently replaced at right back by Sol Bamba and Darren McCormack, who are more accustomed to playing at centre back. Towards the end of the season, van Zanten admitted that he had been "disappointed with my performances" and went on to say that it was probably the worst time to lose form, as he had just joined a new club. He was released by Hibs on 1 September 2009.

After his release from Hibs, van Zanten (along with another former Hibee Alan Reid) appeared on trial for Greenock Morton against Partick Thistle in November 2009. After the game, he was signed on a permanent contract until January 2010. He scored his first goal for Morton in a 4–2 win over Airdrieonians.

It was confirmed on 8 January 2010 that van Zanten had signed a contract with SPL side Hamilton Academical. Van Zanten made his début against former club Hibernian in a 5–1 defeat, providing an assist for his team's only goal. After the 2009–10 SPL season, Van Zanten was released from his contract.

=== Hamilton, St Mirren, Dumbarton & Airdrie ===
Van Zanten returned to St Mirren in June 2010, becoming Danny Lennon's first signing as Saints manager. He signed a one-year extension to this contract in April 2012. After appearing regularly during the 2012–13 season, van Zanten exercised an option to extend his contract for another year. He scored his first and only goal for the club in a 4–3 win at Dundee United.

On 19 May 2014 it was announced that van Zanten would not be offered a new contract, and would be leaving the club after making 332 appearances and scoring 8 goals in all competitions. On 24 June Van Zanten joined Dumbarton. He left the club in May the following year having made 23 appearances in an injury ravaged season. After leaving Dumbarton, van Zanten signed for Scottish League One side Airdrieonians. After only 12 appearances for the Diamonds, van Zanten left Airdrieonians by mutual consent in February 2016.

== Honours ==
St Mirren

- Scottish Football League First Division: 2005–06
- Scottish Challenge Cup: 2005–06
- Scottish League Cup: 2012–13
- Renfrewshire Cup: 2006, 2007, 2010, 2011, 2012
