= Jon Newby =

English footballer

Personal information
- Full name: Jonathan Philip Robert Newby
- Date of birth: 28 November 1978 (age 47)
- Place of birth: Warrington, England
- Height: 1.83 m (6 ft 0 in)
- Position: Striker

Youth career
- 1988–1998: Liverpool

Senior career*
Years	Team	Apps	(Gls)
1998–2001	Liverpool	1	(0)
1999–2000	→ Crewe Alexandra (loan)	6	(0)
2000	→ Sheffield United (loan)	13	(0)
2001	→ Bury (loan)	9	(4)
2001–2003	Bury	100	(17)
2003–2004	Huddersfield Town	14	(0)
2004	→ York City (loan)	7	(0)
2004–2006	Bury	46	(5)
2005–2006	→ Kidderminster Harriers (loan)	7	(0)
2006	Wrexham	11	(0)
2006–2007	Southport	11	(1)
2007–2008	Morecambe	32	(6)
2008–2009	Greenock Morton	4	(1)
2008–2009	→ Burton Albion (loan)	22	(0)
2009–2010	Northwich Victoria	19	(2)
2011–2013	Colwyn Bay	97	(22)
2013–2014	Warrington Town	19	(5)

Managerial career
- 2011–2013: Colwyn Bay
- * Club domestic league appearances and goals as of 00:00, 1 July 2010 (UTC)

Jonathan Philip Robert Newby (born 28 November 1978) is an English former footballer, who played as a striker, and manager.

== Career ==
Known for his lightning pace, Newby began his career with Liverpool, and was involved in their FA Youth Cup win of 1996. He made four appearances for Liverpool (only one of which was in the Premier League against Middlesbrough), and was loaned out to Crewe Alexandra (March 2000), Sheffield United (August 2000), and Bury (February 2001). This final loan move was made permanent, with Bury getting him on a free transfer on 20 March 2001. In summer 2003 he moved on to Huddersfield, but the move was not a success, and following a loan spell at York City, he returned to Bury a year later. He had a loan spell with Kidderminster Harriers during the 2005/06 season, but later returned to Gigg Lane. "Newbs" as he is affectionately known by the Gigg Lane fans was released in May 2006 after failing to break his way back into the first team. He subsequently joined Wrexham for a short spell before leaving the club in December 2006. He joined Southport the following month but was released in May after the club were relegated from the Conference National. Newby signed for Morecambe after a trial period in August 2007.

His first professional hat-trick came against Rotherham United in March 2008, scoring all three goals in the first half and helped Morecambe to a 5–1 victory in a surprising good season for the club. This was also Morecambe's first hat-trick in the football league. After a great season at Morecambe where he finished joint top scorer he was released by manager Sammy McIlroy to the fans dismay.

Newby signed for Scottish First Division side Greenock Morton in July 2008, before going on to score a double that evening in a friendly match against Threave Rovers. He scored on his competitive debut, a 1–1 draw at Broadwood against Clyde.

Newby was loaned to Nigel Clough's Burton Albion, as he was travelling up to Greenock from his home in England, just before the 1 September transfer window deadline.

Clough confirmed after the win over York City that Newby's loan would not be extended past mid-January 2009.

Despite him not having played in the last two games, Newby's loan was extended until the end of January, when the situation will be re-assessed. Despite limited first team appearances under the new manager, Roy McFarland has stated that he is pleased with what he has seen of Newby in training and has signed him until the end of the season.

Newby won the first senior medal of his career as Burton Albion won the Conference National despite defeat to Torquay United on 26 April 2009.

He was released after the end of the 2008–2009 season, as confirmed by Davie Irons on 8 May in the Greenock Telegraph.

After his release from Morton, Newby signed for Conference North club Northwich Victoria in July 2009.

He signed for Colwyn Bay in the close season in time to start the 2010-11 campaign of Northern Premier League Premier Division, helping them secure promotion to the Conference North. On 1 November 2011, he was appointed player-manager following the sudden departure of manager David Challinor to AFC Fylde. And on 1 January 2013 Jon Newby was later sacked as manager of Colwyn Bay after their 4–2 loss to Vauxhall Motors.

In January 2013 he was signed by Warrington Town.

Since 2014, he has been working with the Liverpool F.C. Academy, first with the under-9 and under-12 age groups before becoming head of the under-11s in 2017; he is now part of the club's scouting network.

== Honours ==
=== Liverpool ===
- FA Youth Cup: Champions

1995–96

=== Burton Albion ===
- Conference National: Champions

2008–09

=== Colwyn Bay FC ===
- Northern Premier League Play Off Winners: Promoted

2010–11

- North Wales Coast FA Challenge Cup Winners:

2010–11
