= Allan McManus =

Scottish footballer and coach

Personal information
- Full name: Allan William McManus
- Date of birth: 17 November 1974 (age 51)
- Place of birth: Paisley, Scotland
- Position: Central defender

Team information
- Current team: St Mirren (Head Of Youth Development)

Youth career
- Links United
- 1992–1995: Heart of Midlothian

Senior career*
Years	Team	Apps	(Gls)
1995–1998	Heart of Midlothian	45	(2)
1998	→ Livingston (loan)	10	(1)
1998–2001	Livingston	61	(0)
2001	Alloa Athletic	11	(0)
2001–2002	Airdrieonians	28	(0)
2002–2003	Ayr United	26	(0)
2003–2006	Airdrie United	89	(1)
2006–2008	St Johnstone	63	(2)
2008–2010	Greenock Morton	31	(0)
2010–2011	Dumbarton	8	(0)
2011	→ Arbroath (loan)	11	(0)
Total		383	(6)

Managerial career
- 2009: Greenock Morton (co-player/caretaker)
- 2016: St Mirren (interim manager)
- * Club domestic league appearances and goals

Allan William McManus (born 17 November 1974 in Paisley, Renfrewshire) is a Scottish former professional football player and coach. He played for Hearts, Livingston, Alloa Athletic, Ayr United, Airdrie United, St Johnstone, Greenock Morton, Dumbarton, Arbroath and the now defunct Airdrie.

== Career ==
=== Playing career ===
McManus scored his first St Johnstone goal on 2 January 2007, a 90th-minute winner against Ross County at McDiarmid Park.

McManus made his début for Morton in a 6–3 victory over Stranraer in the League Cup. After the sacking of Davie Irons, McManus was made caretaker manager of Greenock Morton alongside James Grady. They were appointed permanently, with McManus as the assistant manager. on 31 October 2009. McManus and Grady were sacked on 9 May 2010, after narrowly avoiding relegation from the First Division.

McManus was then offered a chance to take up playing again with Dumbarton, and agreed to sign for the 2010–11 season. McManus joined third division leaders Arbroath on a one–month emergency loan on 18 February 2011, but then retired from playing at the end of the season.

=== Coaching career ===
After an unsuccessful start to the 2016–17 season, St Mirren boss Alex Rae and his assistant David Farrell were both sacked by the club, with Head of Youth Development, McManus, being appointed interim manager.

== Honours ==
Hearts

- Scottish Cup: 1

1997–98

Livingston

- Scottish Football League First Division: 1

2000–01

Airdrieonians

- Scottish Challenge Cup: 1

2001–02

Airdrie United

- Scottish Football League Second Division: 1

2003–2004

St Johnstone

- Scottish Challenge Cup: 1

2007–08

== Managerial statistics ==
As of 19 September 2016

Team	Nat	From	To	Record				
Team	Nat	From	To	G	W	D	L	Win %
Greenock Morton	(Scotland)	22 September 2009	31 October 2009	6	2	0	4	33.33
St Mirren	(Scotland)	18 September 2016	4 October 2016	3	1	1	1	33.33
Total				9	3	1	5	33.33
