= Ryan Harding =

Scottish footballer (born 1984)

Personal information
- Full name: Ryan Harding
- Date of birth: 27 April 1984 (age 42)
- Place of birth: Edinburgh, Scotland
- Position: Defender

Team information
- Current team: Civil Service Strollers

Youth career
- Hutchison Vale
- 2002–2003: Hibernian

Senior career*
Years	Team	Apps	(Gls)
2003–2005	Livingston	3	(0)
2005–2009	Greenock Morton	124	(5)
2009–2010	East Stirlingshire	22	(0)
2010–2011	Birkirkara	8	(0)
2011–2013	Alloa Athletic	35	(1)
2012	→ Peterhead (loan)	3	(0)
2013–	Civil Service Strollers	0	(0)
- * Club domestic league appearances and goals as of 21:55, 9 August 2013 (UTC)

Ryan Harding (born 27 April 1984 in Edinburgh) is a Scottish semi-professional footballer who plays for Civil Service Strollers as a defender.

Over the course of his career he played for Livingston, Greenock Morton and East Stirlingshire before leaving for Malta. On his return he played for Alloa and Peterhead, before joining Civil Service Strollers in 2013.

== Playing career ==
Harding began his senior career with Scottish Premier League club Hibernian. From there he moved into another SPL side, Livingston. Ryan made just three league appearances and one other appearance in the C.I.S. Insurance Cup for Livingston. This appearance was against his future club Greenock Morton. During a match played in terrible weather conditions at Almondvale Stadium, he scored a diving header in to his own net that was strangely ruled out for offside.

Ryan signed on at Cappielow towards the end of the 2004–05 season on a short-term deal. He signed a longer deal at the start of the next season and continued to play for the club. He plays in the centre back position and formed partnership with fellow centre back Stewart Greacen, although was sidelined by the arrival of Dominic Shimmin for season 2007–08. Harding suffered a serious injury in October 2008, and missed the rest of the season due to it. He was released in November 2009.

Harding signed for East Stirlingshire on amateur forms on 3 December 2009 but was released at the end of the season.

Harding left Scotland to sign for Maltese side Birkirkara on 31 August 2010, making his début against Sliema Wanderers on 13 September 2010, but retired through injury early in 2011.

Despite this, he returned to Scotland to sign for Alloa Athletic in June 2011. In September 2012, Harding went on loan to Peterhead to cover their defensive injury crisis. It was the third time he had played under Jim McIntyre.

He left Alloa in 2013 and signed with Civil Service Strollers.

== Honours ==
Greenock Morton

- Scottish Football League Second Division: 1

2006–07

Alloa Athletic

- Scottish Football League Third Division: 1

2011–12
