= Bryn Halliwell =

English footballer and coach

Personal information
- Full name: Bryn Stephen Halliwell
- Date of birth: 1 October 1980 (age 46)
- Place of birth: Epsom, England
- Position: Goalkeeper

Team information
- Current team: Caledonian Braves (goalkeeping coach)

Youth career
- 1998–2000: Wimbledon

Senior career*
Years	Team	Apps	(Gls)
2000–2005	Clyde	149	(0)
2005–2006	Dunfermline Athletic	12	(0)
2006–2007	St Johnstone	19	(0)
2007–2008	Hamilton Academical	23	(0)
2008–2009	Queen of the South	4	(0)
2009	Greenock Morton	1	(0)
2009–2010	Forfar Athletic	0	(0)
2010–2011	Partick Thistle	12	(0)
2011	→ Clyde (loan)	15	(0)
2011–2014	Sauchie		
2014	Shettleston		
2014	Heart of Midlothian	0	(0)
2014–2016	Shettleston		
2016–2017	Gartcairn Juniors		
2017	→ Greenock Morton (loan)	1	(0)
- * Club domestic league appearances and goals as of 16:14, 13 May 2017 (UTC)

Bryn Stephen Halliwell (born 1 October 1980) is an English former football goalkeeper who is a goalkeeping coach at Caledonian Braves.

Halliwell started his career in the youth team at London side Wimbledon, before moving in the Scottish Football League with Clyde. After leaving the Cumbernauld side in 2005, Halliwell spent the next six years playing for seven different Scottish clubs, culminating in a loan spell back at Clyde from former rivals Partick Thistle.

After being released by the Glasgow side, Halliwell moved into the Junior ranks with Sauchie, then Shettleston.

Bryn's son, Alfie Halliwell, who is in the Rangers FC Academy, was selected for the Scotland under-16 squad in August 2022

== Career ==
He began his career at the now defunct Wimbledon, but it was at Clyde, whom he joined in 2000, where he established himself. Halliwell remained with Clyde for five years, and in 2005 signed for Dunfermline Athletic.

During Halliwell's Dunfermline career, Allan McGregor was signed on loan from Rangers, meaning the Englishman slipped to being second-choice goalkeeper. However, since Rangers would not permit McGregor to play against them, Halliwell would take his place whenever the Pars played the Glasgow club.

Halliwell signed for St Johnstone in August 2006. He made his league debut for Saints on 5 August 2006, against Clyde, his former club. He kept a clean sheet in a goalless draw.

After leaving St Johnstone he teamed up with his former manager at Clyde, Billy Reid, at Hamilton Academical where he went on to make a useful contribution to the team's successful season in the First Division, gaining promotion to the Scottish Premier League. Halliwell was offered a new contract by Accies but rejected it and left the club.

After a successful trial spell, Halliwell was signed by Queen of the South manager Gordon Chisholm minutes before their first pre-season game against Scottish Football League newcomers Annan Athletic on 12 July 2008.

In July 2009, Halliwell joined Greenock Morton on a month-long contract as cover for the injured Kevin Cuthbert. He made his competitive début in the Challenge Cup against Dumbarton on 26 July. At the end of his month-long deal, Halliwell was released before the transfer window shut allowing him to sign for another club at any time outwith the window.

In the middle of November 2009, Halliwell signed for Forfar Athletic, subsequently moving to Partick Thistle in January 2010. In February 2011, having lost his place in the Partick team, Halliwell returned to his former club Clyde, on loan till the end of the season. He was released by Thistle at the end of the season.

In August 2011, after 11 seasons in the senior ranks, the Englishman signed for Clackmannanshire Junior side Sauchie.

On 20 August 2014, he signed a short-term contract with Hearts to provide emergency cover during a goalkeeping crisis.

After a spell in the junior ranks with Gartcairn, Halliwell appeared for Forfar Athletic as a trialist on 11 March 2017 in a 2–1 defeat to Edinburgh City following a suspension to regular keeper Grant Adam.

He returned to Morton on loan from Gartcairn as cover for Derek Gaston.

== Honours ==
Sauchie

- East Region Premier League: 2011–12
- East of Scotland Cup: 2013–14
