= Peter Weatherson =

English footballer

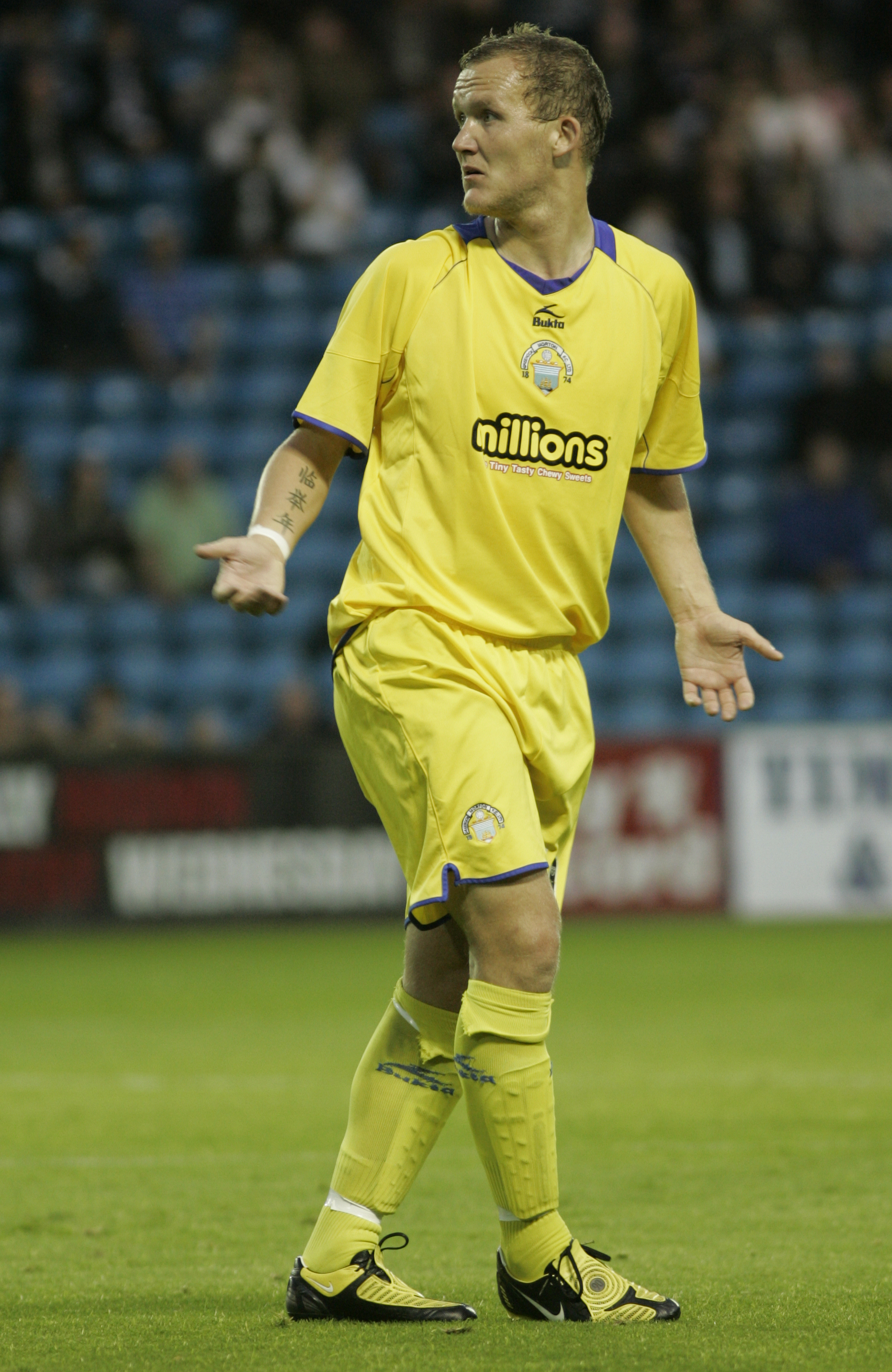
- Weatherson with Greenock Morton

Personal information
- Full name: Peter Joseph Weatherson
- Date of birth: 29 May 1980 (age 46)
- Place of birth: North Shields, England
- Position: Striker

Youth career
- –2000: Newcastle Blue Star

Senior career*
Years	Team	Apps	(Gls)
2000–2003	Queen of the South	98	(38)
2003–2013	Greenock Morton	323	(93)
2013–2016	Annan Athletic	64	(38)
2016–2017	Shettleston	?	(?)
2016-2017	Annan Athletic	16	(5)
Total		501	(174)

Managerial career
- 2016–2017: Shettleston
- 2023–2024: Stranraer (assistant)
- * Club domestic league appearances and goals as of 8 August 2018

Peter Joseph Weatherson (born 29 May 1980) is an English former professional footballer who mainly played as a striker for Greenock Morton. Weatherson also played for Newcastle Blue Star, Queen of the South and Annan Athletic. Weatherson was also joint player-manager of Shettleston in the Scottish Juniors, West Region.

Weatherson started his senior career with Dumfries club Queen of the South from 2000 until 2003, after initially playing with local club Newcastle Blue Star. Weatherson then went on to play for Greenock Morton for a decade from 2003 until 2013 and then Annan Athletic from 2013 until 2016, before going to Shettleston in the Scottish Juniors, West Region as joint player-manager. Weatherson returned to Annan Athletic for a second spell on 13 January 2017, leaving Shettleston after only five months in charge and retired from playing football at the end of the 2016–17 season, as he approached 37 years old on 29 May 2017.

== Career ==
=== Early years ===
Born in North Shields, Weatherson began his career with local non-league club Newcastle Blue Star.

=== Queen of the South ===
In the summer of 2000, John Connolly, the Dumfries club Queen of the South's manager, signed Weatherson to play in the Scottish Football League, where he mainly featured as a striker and occasionally played as a right midfielder. During the 2001–02 season, Weatherson scored 15 league goals in 33 league appearances, as the Palmerston Park club won the Scottish Football League Second Division Championship. Under the captaincy of Jim Thomson, the title was clinched after a 3–0 win at Forfar Athletic on 20 April 2002. In that match, Weatherson scored the first two Queens goals and the third goal was scored by Sean O'Connor, who Queens signed from Dundee United, having watched him play for Greenock Morton during his loan spell at Cappielow.

At the end of the 2002–03 season, Partick Thistle made an offer of £10,000 to Queens for Weatherson, however this offer was rejected and this allowed Greenock Morton to table a bid of £30,000 that was then accepted by Queens.

=== Greenock Morton ===
Weatherson moved from Dumfries to Greenock at the start of the 2003–04 season. Weatherson scored 14 league goals in 31 league appearances in his first season, scoring a total of 20 goals in 37 appearances in all competitions. Morton led by 12 points at New Year before Weatherson broke a metatarsal ruling him out injured for six weeks. Their form promptly collapsed compounded by allegations of a booze culture among players and toxifying unproven rumours reported in the press of Weatherson and other players betting against Morton. Morton finished fourth.

Weatherson started playing in defence after manager Jim McInally used him as a utility centre-back in a 7–1 Scottish Cup win away at Cove Rangers. Weatherson played at right back for Greenock Morton in the 2006–07 season, from where he still scored goals. On 6 October 2007 Weatherson scored a hat-trick versus Partick Thistle as a striker.

On 10 March 2007, Weatherson scored his 100th career goal in a 3–0 victory versus Alloa Athletic at Recreation Park. Weatherson was the Greenock club's top scorer for the 2006–07 season, scoring four goals in a 9–1 win at Cappielow versus Forfar Athletic and his season's total was then 17 goals, 15 of them scored from playing in defence and 2 from playing in midfield.

Weatherson finished four of his first seven seasons at Greenock Morton as the club's leading goalscorer. The seasons when Weatherson did not achieve this feat was the 2005–06 season, when he finished second behind returning fans' favourite Derek Lilley, then in season 2008–09 when he finished second again, this time behind Brian Wake and finally in season 2010–11, when he finished third behind Brian Graham, who was first and Allan Jenkins, who was second.

Weatherson is Ton's fourth highest post-World War II league goalscorer with 93 league goals, 5 goals short of another former Queens striker, Rowan Alexander with 98 league goals, who is in third. (See table on club page).

After scoring the first of his two goals versus Queens on 8 November 2008, Weatherson reached the milestone of 100 league goals in the Scottish Football League, having scored 38 goals for Queens and at that particular time, 62 goals for Greenock Morton.

In January 2010, Weatherson signed a two-year extension to his existing contract, after rejecting an approach by Partick Thistle for the second time in his career.

On 16 October 2010, versus Queens at Cappielow, Weatherson's brace of goals were his 100th and 101st for Greenock Morton, in all competitions.

In May 2012, Weatherson received another one-year extension to his contract, after which he was granted a testimonial for playing a decade at the Renfrewshire club. Weatherson's testimonial match was versus St Johnstone on 13 July 2013, even though he had already signed for the Dumfries and Galloway club, Annan Athletic for season 2013–14. Weatherson departed Greenock Morton in the summer of 2013, having played well over 400 matches and scoring 121 goals in all competitions.

=== Annan Athletic ===
In the summer of 2013, Weatherson signed for Annan Athletic. On 27 July 2013, Weatherson scored versus former club Greenock Morton as Annan Athletic won 1–0 and knocked the Greenock club out of the Scottish Challenge Cup.

In May 2015, Weatherson signed a contract extension at Annan Athletic for the 2015–16 season.

=== Shettleston Juniors ===
Weatherson was then announced as one of the joint player-managers at Shettleston in March 2016, alongside his Galabankies teammate Ryan McStay, with their tenure to commence at the start of the 2016–17 season in the Scottish Juniors, West Region.

Weatherson departed Shettleston by mutual consent, alongside joint player-manager McStay on 9 January 2017, after a 1–1 draw at home to Irvine Meadow on 7 January 2017.

=== Return to Annan Athletic ===
Weatherson signed for a second spell at Scottish League Two club Annan Athletic on 13 January 2017, as he re-signed for the Galabankies for the rest of the 2016–17 season, less than one week after leaving Shettleston, where he was joint player-manager.

=== Retirement ===
Weatherson announced his retirement from playing football at the end of the 2016–17 season, as he approached 37 years old on 29 May 2017.

== Honours ==
=== Club ===
Queen of the South

- Scottish Football League Second Division: Winners 2001–02

Morton

- Scottish Football League Second Division: Winners 2006–07

=== Personal ===
- Queen of the South Top Scorer: 2000–01
- Greenock Morton Top Scorer: (5) 2003–04, 2004–05, 2006–07, 2007–08, 2009–10
- Annan Athletic Top Scorer: 2014–15
- Scottish Second Division Player of the Year: Nominee 2006–07
- SPFA League Two Team of the Year: 2014–15
- League Two Top Goalscorer: 2014–15
- SPFL Top League Goalscorer: 2014–15
- SPFL Team of the Year: 2014–15
