= Alex Walker (footballer, born 1984) =

Scottish footballer

Personal information
- Date of birth: 25 April 1984 (age 42)
- Place of birth: Bellshill, Scotland
- Position: Defender

Youth career
- –2003: Rangers

Senior career*
Years	Team	Apps	(Gls)
2003–2005	Rangers	2	(0)
2004	→ Clyde (loan)	15	(1)
2005–2010	Greenock Morton	84	(4)
2010	→ Brechin City (loan)	3	(0)
2010–2011	East Stirlingshire	18	(1)
- * Club domestic league appearances and goals as of 2 September 2011

Alexander Walker (born 25 April 1984) is a Scottish former professional footballer.

Walker has previously played for Rangers and Greenock Morton, as well as having loan spells at Clyde and Brechin City. He played mainly as a defender, although he also played in midfield.

== Career ==
He began his career at Rangers, where he made 2 appearances. Walker made his senior league début in a 1–0 win over Motherwell at Fir Park, coming off the bench to replace Hamed Namouchi. Walker had a six-month loan spell at Clyde in which he made his Bully Wee début in a 1–0 victory at Broadwood Stadium against Ross County. During this time, Walker won the SFL young player of the month award for September 2004. After his short-term deal at Broadwood, Walker went to Sweden for a couple of months but decided to come back home. he joined Morton in July 2005. Walker made his Morton début in a 3–2 (AET) Challenge Cup win over Gretna, in which assistant boss at Morton, Derek Collins, and later-to-be teammate Ryan McGuffie played for the opposition. His senior league debut was the following week against Raith Rovers, in which Morton triumphed 2–0 in front of 3,222 fans. He signed a new contract in May 2009, for another year at Morton. Being out of contract in the summer, and struggling for fitness, Walker was loaned to Brechin City for three months in January 2010. Walker suffered a recurrence of a groin injury, where he underwent surgery but remained at Brechin until April. He was released at the end of the 2009–10 season. After his release from Morton, Walker decided to go part-time and was signed up by ex-manager Jim McInally at East Stirlingshire for the 2010–11 season.
