= Dominic Shimmin =

English footballer

Personal information
- Full name: Dominic Edward Shimmin
- Date of birth: 13 October 1987 (age 39)
- Place of birth: Bermondsey, England
- Height: 6 ft 0 in (1.83 m)
- Position: Central defender

Youth career
- 1995–2005: Arsenal

Senior career*
Years	Team	Apps	(Gls)
2005–2008	Queens Park Rangers	3	(0)
2007	→ AFC Bournemouth (loan)	2	(0)
2008	Crawley Town	2	(0)
2008–2010	Greenock Morton	38	(0)
2010	Dundee	1	(0)
2011–2012	Dover Athletic	3	(0)

International career
2003	England U16	4	(0)
- * Club domestic league appearances and goals as of 3 March 2011

Dominic Edward Shimmin (born 13 October 1987, in Bermondsey) is an English former footballer.

In his career, he has also played for Arsenal, Queens Park Rangers, AFC Bournemouth and Crawley Town. Shimmin mainly plays as a centre half.

== Career (England) ==
Shimmin started his career spending six years at Highbury playing for the various youth teams at Arsenal under Arsène Wenger.

After leaving the Gunners, Shimmin made the move across the city to Queens Park Rangers, with whom he played from 2005 until January 2008. The deal was for a small nominal fee at first, with up to £80,000 in add-ons, dependent on appearances.

Shimmin made his début against Coventry City in a 3–0 defeat, however a serious nose injury prevented him from playing many games for QPR.

During this time Shimmin had a loan spell at AFC Bournemouth where he only managed 2 league games due to injury. QPR announced that Shimmin's contract had been cancelled by mutual consent on 28 January 2008.

On 8 February 2008, Shimmin joined Crawley Town on a short-term deal. He was released in March, after failing to overcome a hamstring injury. He impressed whilst at Crawley and it was with a heavy heart that the Red Devils were forced to release him.

== Career (Scotland) ==
In July 2008, Shimmin joined St Mirren on trial, but signed for Greenock Morton soon afterwards.

Shimmin made his Morton début in a Co-operative Insurance Cup tie at Stair Park, in which Morton won 6–3 against the home side Stranraer to progress to the second round where Morton would dispose of SPL side Hibernian in a seven-goal thriller.

He made his first league appearance for Morton in a 2–2 draw with St Johnstone at Cappielow on 8 August 2008.

Shimmin was named Irn-Bru Phenomenal Young Player of the Month for October 2008, after helping Morton to rally after a poor start to the season.

Shimmin spent nine months out 'injured', from March 2009, making a return on the bench for the Scottish Cup game at Dumbarton on 5 December.

He was released by Morton at the end of the 2009–10 season.

Shimmin, as of 27 May 2010 has signed a two-year contract at Dundee. He had his contract terminated by administrators on 15 October 2010.

== Return to England ==
After his release by Dundee, Shimmin signed in 2011 for Dover Athletic.

== International career ==
Shimmin made four appearances for the England under-16 side in 2003, whilst playing in the David Carins Memorial Trophy in County Antrim, Northern Ireland.

== Honours ==
=== Individual ===
- SFL Young Player of the Month: October 2008

== See also ==
- 2008–09 Greenock Morton F.C. season | 09–10
