= Derek Collins =

Scottish footballer (born 1969)

Personal information
- Full name: Derek Collins
- Date of birth: 15 April 1969 (age 57)
- Place of birth: Glasgow, Scotland
- Height: 5 ft 8 in (1.73 m)
- Position: Defender

Youth career
- Renfrew Waverley

Senior career*
Years	Team	Apps	(Gls)
1987–1998	Greenock Morton	417	(11)
1998–2001	Hibernian	40	(0)
2000–2001	→ Partick Thistle (loan)	12	(1)
2001	→ Preston North End (loan)	0	(0)
2001	→ Sliema Wanderers (loan)		
2001–2005	Greenock Morton	117	(1)
2005–2006	Gretna	17	(0)
- * Club domestic league appearances and goals as of 21:53, 26 September 2009 (UTC)

Derek Collins (born 15 April 1969 in Glasgow) is a Scottish former professional footballer.

Collins started his playing career with Greenock Morton where he spent over a decade after making his debut in 1987. In 1997 Collins joined Hibernian and returned to Greenock Morton via loan spells at Preston North End, Partick Thistle and Sliema Wanderers of Malta.

In his second spell with Greenock Morton, Collins established himself as the holder of the record number of appearances for the club. (534 appearances, overtaking the previous record holder, David Wylie, by 52 games.)

In January 2005, Collins signed for Gretna where he combined his playing role with coaching duties before becoming a coach full-time for the 2006–07 season.

Derek Collins also has the honour of being the only player to play in all four of Scotland's senior leagues with the same club (Greenock Morton), a feat he achieved when he captained Morton against Gretna in Gretna's first ever Scottish Football League game.

When Davie Irons left Gretna for Morton as manager, Collins went with him as his assistant.

In September 2009, after a poor start to the season, Collins and Irons were sacked by Morton.

== Honours ==
Greenock Morton

- Scottish Second Division: 1994–95
- Scottish Third Division: 2002–03

Hibernian

- Scottish First Division: 1998–99

Partick Thistle

- Scottish Second Division: 2000–01

Gretna

- Scottish Second Division: 2005–06
- Scottish Third Division: 2004–05

== See also ==
- List of footballers in Scotland by number of league appearances (500+)
