= Davie Irons =

Scottish football manager and former player

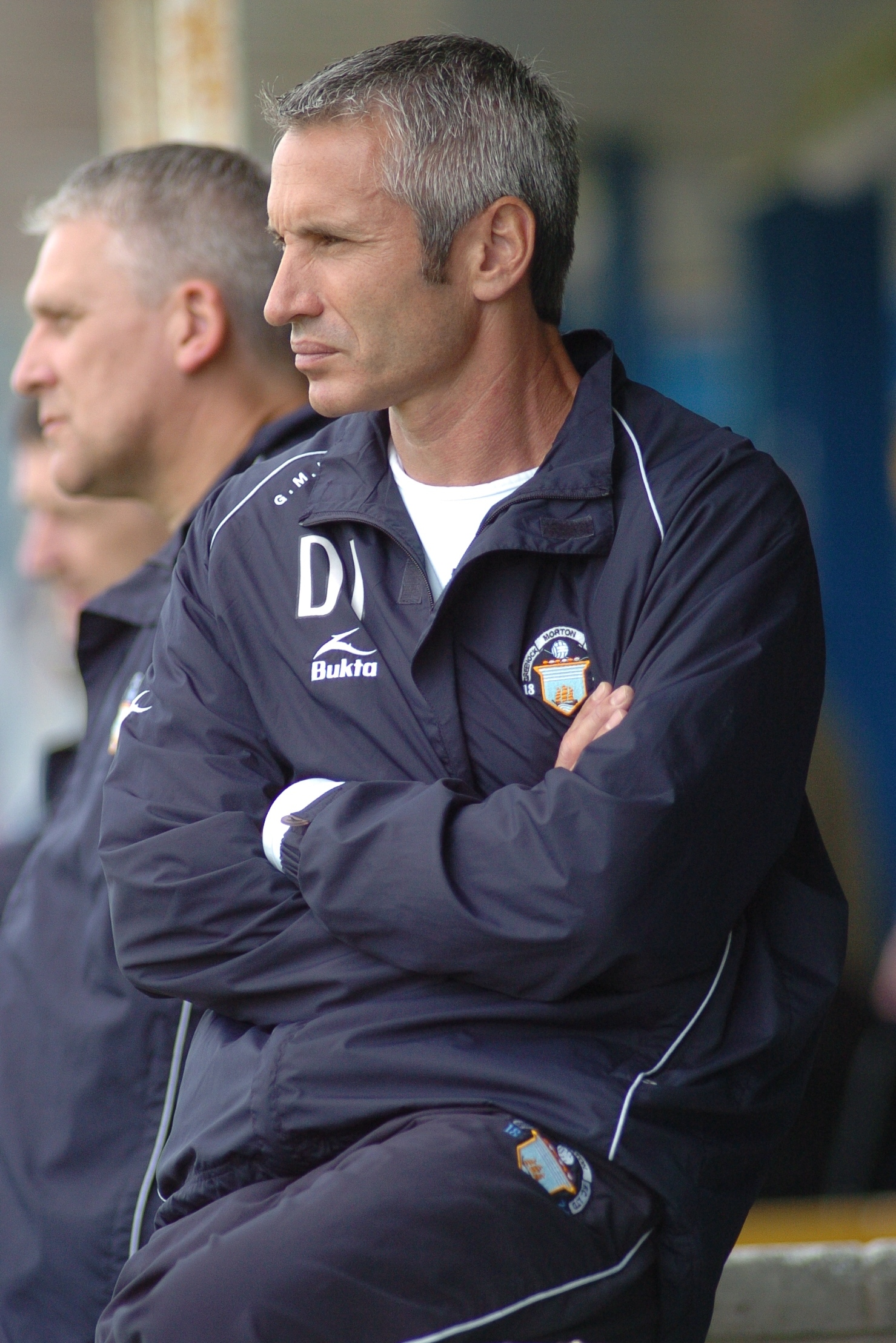
- Irons in 2008

Personal information
- Full name: David John Irons
- Date of birth: 18 July 1961 (age 65)
- Place of birth: Glasgow, Scotland
- Positions: Midfielder; defender

Youth career
- 1975–1979: Greystone Rovers

Senior career*
Years	Team	Apps	(Gls)
1979–1980	Queen of the South	3	(0)
1980–1984	Kello Rovers	?	(?)
1984–1987	Ayr United	75	(12)
1987–1988	Clydebank	54	(7)
1988–1991	Dunfermline Athletic	106	(9)
1991–1993	Partick Thistle	84	(10)
1993–1996	St Johnstone	52	(2)
1996–1997	Clydebank	43	(1)
1997–2002	Annan Athletic	?	(?)
2002–2005	Gretna	89	(2)
2009–2010	Threave Rovers		(?)
Total		506	(43)

Managerial career
- 1997: Clydebank (caretaker)
- 1997–2002: Annan Athletic (player-manager)
- 2007: Gretna (caretaker)
- 2007–2008: Gretna
- 2008–2009: Greenock Morton
- 2010–2012: Stenhousemuir
- 2013: Carlisle United (caretaker)
- 2017–2018: Gretna 2008
- 2019–2021: Stenhousemuir
- * Club domestic league appearances and goals as of 25 November 2008

David John Irons (born 18 July 1961) is a Scottish former football player and coach.

Irons' playing career spanned 26 years as a central defender or midfielder for a host of clubs, most notably for Ayr United, Clydebank, Dunfermline Athletic and Partick Thistle. Irons has previously been manager of Annan Athletic, Gretna, Greenock Morton, Stenhousemuir and Gretna 2008, and assistant-manager at Carlisle United.

== Early life ==
Born in Glasgow in 1961, Davie Irons was raised in Dumfries after moving to Dumfries and Galloway with his parents in 1964.

== Playing career ==
Irons began his career with local club Queen of the South in 1979. After only one year of the Harkness Era at Palmerston Park and a total of four first team appearances, Irons moved into Scottish Junior football, joining Kello Rovers, where he played for four seasons. Irons returned to the professional game in 1984 with Ayr United and went on to play in 75 league matches for The Honest Men, scoring 12 league goals at Somerset Park.

In 1987, Irons signed for Clydebank, playing in 54 league matches, scoring 7 league goals. The following season Irons signed for Dunfermline Athletic. Irons scored the opening goal for the Pars in the match which confirmed Queen of the South's relegation to the Second Division in May 1989. After 106 league matches and 9 league goals for the Fife club, Irons signed for Partick Thistle, where he stayed for two seasons in Maryhill, playing in 84 league matches, scoring 10 league goals. Irons then joined the sixth professional club of his career, St Johnstone in Perth in the summer of 1993, playing for three seasons at McDiarmid Park, playing in 52 league matches and scored two goals.

Irons returned to Dumfries club Queens, under the new regime of Norman Blount, to play for a Queens Select team on 23 April 1995. The opposition club was Rangers, in a game that ended in a 2–2 draw, to mark Queens' 75th anniversary and the opening of the new East Stand. Other former players to appear alongside Irons included Andy Thomson and Ted McMinn.

Irons then signed for Clydebank for the 1996–97 season, playing in 43 league matches and scoring one solitary goal.

== Coaching career ==
Irons spent five seasons as the player-manager of Annan Athletic from 1997 until 2002.

=== Gretna ===
In 2005, Irons' playing career ended after three seasons with Gretna, having played in 89 league matches, scoring two goals for the Black and Whites. Irons then agreed to be the assistant-manager to Rowan Alexander to remain with Gretna. After this Irons was the caretaker-manager of Gretna between March 2007 and the end of the 2006–07 season, during Alexander's sabbatical from the Dumfries and Galloway club. Gretna then won promotion to the Premier League on 28 April 2007, after a 3–2 win at Dingwall versus Ross County. This victory clinched the First Division Championship for the Black and Whites as they finished one point ahead of one of Irons' former club's, St Johnstone. On 18 July 2007, Irons was appointed Gretna's permanent manager, with Mick Wadsworth as the club's assistant-manager. On 19 February 2008, Irons resigned as Gretna's manager and soon afterwards the club entered administration and went out of business at the end of the 2007–08 season.

=== Greenock Morton ===
Irons was then appointed manager of Greenock Morton soon after departing from the Gretna manager's position. Irons' first priority was to retain Morton's place in the First Division. The club won two key matches versus Dunfermline Athletic and Partick Thistle, both by the scoreline of 3–0 and this retained Morton's place in the First Division, as the club's goal difference was one better than Clyde and the Renfrewshire club ended in eighth place.

In Irons' first full season as manager of Greenock Morton, the 2008–09, the club finished in sixth place in the First Division, despite a poor start to the season, when the club only amassed four points from the first quarter of the season. Irons also achieved a win versus Hibs at Easter Road in the Scottish League Cup that same season. However, after a poor start to the 2009–10 season, losing five of the first six league matches and with the club at the basement of the First Division, Irons contract was terminated with immediate effect on 21 September 2009, alongside the club's assistant-manager Derek Collins.

=== Threave Rovers ===
After being sacked by Greenock Morton, Irons was appointed the player-coach of South of Scotland League club Threave Rovers from Castle Douglas. When Irons appeared as a used substitute in the final minute of a match versus Whitehill Welfare on 24 October 2009, Irons was the oldest player to have played in a Scottish Cup match at the age of 48 years and 98 days. Irons then replaced Gerry Britton as the assistant-manager of Partick Thistle in January 2010 but Irons' contract was terminated by the club on 26 February 2010. After leaving the Jags, Irons returned to Threave Rovers as a player-coach once again. Irons then superseded his own record as the oldest player to appear in a Scottish Cup match, when aged 49 and a number of days, he played for Threave Rovers on 20 November 2010 in the third round of the Scottish Cup in a 2–2 draw versus Stenhousemuir at Ochilview Park.

=== Stenhousemuir ===
Irons was then appointed manager of the Warriors at the end of December 2010. Irons then resigned as the club's manager in July 2012 for personal reasons.

=== Carlisle United ===
Following his resignation of the Stirlingshire club, Irons joined Police Scotland and was also working part-time as a scout for Carlisle United.

After a short term job as a coach with Northern Football League club Celtic Nation, Irons departed the club to rejoin the Brunton Park club as the full-time youth team manager in July 2013, after the departure of former coach Eric Kinder to Blackburn Rovers. Irons had also started attending friendly matches with the Cumbrians manager Greg Abbott around the same time. Following a poor start to the 2013–14 season, Irons was appointed caretaker-manager of the Cumbrians after the departure of Abbott, alongside Graham Kavanagh and Tony Caig. On 30 September 2013 Irons was appointed Kavanagh's permanent assistant-manager of Carlisle United.

=== Gretna 2008 ===
On 8 August 2017, Irons was appointed manager of Gretna 2008, alongside Andy Aitken. Both resigned their position as joint managers on 27 November 2018.

=== Second spell as Stenhousemuir manager ===
Irons began a second spell as manager of Stenhousemuir in September 2019. Stenhousemuir announced on 20 April 2021 that Irons would leave the club by mutual consent after their game later that day.

== Personal life ==
Irons is married to Gillian and has three children. His daughter, Amy is a radio and TV presenter who works for Heart Scotland and BBC Scotland. Eldest son, Lewis, is also a presenter who works for the BBC as a sport reporter.

== Managerial statistics ==
As of match played 20 April 2021

Managerial record by team and tenure
Team	From	To	Record				
Team	From	To	P	W	D	L	Win %
Gretna	6 March 2007	19 February 2008	51	9	13	29	17.6
Greenock Morton	19 February 2008	27 May 2010	102	33	25	44	32.4
Stenhousemuir	30 December 2010	1 July 2012	66	24	13	29	36.4
Stenhousemuir	27 September 2019	20 April 2021	49	14	11	24	28.6
Total			268	80	62	126	29.9

- statistics available from soccerbase.com

== Honours ==
Dunfermline Athletic

- Scottish First Division: 1988–89

Partick Thistle

- Scottish First Division promotion: 1991–92

Gretna

- Scottish First Division: 2006–07
