= 1927–28 Dumbarton F.C. season =

Dumbarton
1927–1928 season
- Manager: Donald Colman
- Stadium: Boghead Park, Dumbarton
- Scottish League Division Two: 11th
- Scottish Cup: First Round
- Top goalscorer: League: Angus Urquhart (36); All: Angus Urquhart (36)

The 1927–28 season was the 51st Scottish football season in which Dumbarton competed at national level, entering the Scottish Football League and the Scottish Cup. In addition Dumbarton played in the Dumbartonshire Cup.

== Scottish League ==
Dumbarton's sixth consecutive season in the Second Division, while certainly an improvement on the previous season, was unremarkable in most respects. A run of six league defeats at the beginning of 1928 brought the threat of relegation, but 5 wins from 6 games at the end of the season lifted the team to an 11th place out of 20 with 36 points - 18 behind champions Ayr United.

13 August 1927 League	Dumbarton	0–1	Arthurlie	Boghead Park
			Armstrong 10'	Attendance: 3,000; Referee: A Jennings

20 August 1927 League	Queen of the South	6–2	Dumbarton	Palmerston Park
	Connell 1'; McCall 44'; Mackie; Halliday 89'		Crawford 11'; Urquhart	Referee: H Watson

27 August 1927 League	Dumbarton	3–3	St Bernard's	Boghead Park
	Urquhart 7'; Kirk		McCuaig; Dickson 83'	Attendance: 2,000; Referee: C MacDonald

3 September 1927 League	Bathgate	2–3	Dumbarton	Mill Park, Bathgate
	McKinley 62'; Houston 67'		Urquhart 32', 87'; Crawford 37'	Referee: W Jamieson

10 September 1927 League	Dumbarton	5–0	Morton	Boghead Park
	Russell 5', 41'; Urquhart 54'; McLardie 60'; Harvie			Referee: J Leggatt

17 September 1927 League	Albion Rovers	2–3	Dumbarton	Cliftonhill
	Quinn 67'; McKenna (pen.)		McLardie 72', 80'; Russell 81'	Attendance: 2,500; Referee: W Webb

24 September 1927 League	Dumbarton	4–5	King's Park	Boghead Park
	Russell 1'; Urquhart 12' (pen.), 78' (pen.), 88' (pen.)		Granger 10'; Leonard 37'; Toner 63', 72', 83' (pen.)	Attendance: 3,000; Referee: J McKay

1 October 1927 League	Alloa Athletic	3–3	Dumbarton	Recreation Park, Alloa
	Campbell 40'; Barr 42'		Russell 15'; Kirk 60'; Crawford	Referee: R Seith

8 October 1927 League	Dumbarton	2–0	Forfar Athletic	Boghead Park
	Russell 15'; Miller 60'			Attendance: 2,000; Referee: H Watson

15 October 1927 League	Clydebank	1–2	Dumbarton	Clydeholm Park
	Thomson 40'		Crawford 55', 80'	Attendance: 3,000; Referee: J Hudson

22 October 1927 League	Third Lanark	4–1	Dumbarton	Cathkin Park
	McCurley 12'; Hamill; Parker		Crawford 43'	Attendance: 3,000; Referee: J Prior

29 October 1927 League	Dumbarton	2–2	Leith Athletic	Boghead Park
	Russell; McPhail		Elliot 48'; Young	Attendance: 3,000; Referee: W Webb

5 November 1927 League	Dumbarton	1–3	East Fife	Boghead Park
	Kirk 75'		Weir 20'; Paterson 83'; Cowan 90'	Attendance: 2,000; Referee: R Seith

12 November 1927 League	East Stirling	5–0	Dumbarton	Firs Park
	Stoddard 4' 43' (pen.) 70' (pen.); Russell			Referee: W Webb

19 November 1927 League	Dumbarton	2–0	Ayr United	Boghead Park
	Urquhart 20', 33'			Attendance: 1,500; Referee: G Robertson

26 November 1927 League	Dundee United	3–1	Dumbarton	Tannadice Park
	Campbell 70'; Walker 85' (pen.); Kay 87'		Urquhart	Attendance: 7,000; Referee: J Grant

3 December 1927 League	Armadale	2–0	Dumbarton	Volunteer Park, Armadale
	Grove 25', 83'			Referee: J Rowan

10 December 1927 League	Dumbarton	2–0	Arbroath	Boghead Park
	Urquhart 42'; Crawford 58'			Attendance: 1,000; Referee: W Jamieson

17 December 1927 League	Stenhousemuir	1–0	Dumbarton	Ochilview Park
	Morrison, E 45'			Referee: C Ritchie

24 December 1927 League	Arthurlie	0–1	Dumbarton	Dunterlie Park
			Urquhart 15'	Referee: A Stewart

31 December 1927 League	Dumbarton	2–1	Bathgate	Boghead Park
	Urquhart 44', 65'		Hughes 40'	Referee: J Rowan

2 January 1928 League	Dumbarton	0–2	Clydebank	Boghead Park
			Thomson; Chalmers	Attendance: 2,000; Referee: W Blair

3 January 1928 League	Morton	2–0	Dumbarton	Cappielow Park
	Jessman			Attendance: 2,000; Referee: J Leggatt

7 January 1928 League	St Bernard's	2–0	Dumbarton	Royal Gymnasium Ground
	Swanson 5'; Patrick			Referee: W McDonald

14 January 1928 League	Dumbarton	0–1	Albion Rovers	Boghead Park
			Trialist 60'	Referee: J Hudson

28 January 1928 League	Forfar Athletic	3–2	Dumbarton	Station Park, Forfar
	Menzies 15'; Davidson 40'; McLean 88' (pen.)		Urquhart 53', 85' (pen.)	Referee: W Blair

4 February 1928 League	Leith Athletic	2–1	Dumbarton	New Powderhall
	Anderson; Aitchison (o.g.)		Crawford	Attendance: 1,500

8 February 1928 League	Dumbarton	2–1	Alloa Athletic	Boghead Park
	Urquhart; Kirk		Junior	Referee: J Robertson

11 February 1928 League	King's Park	4–0	Dumbarton	Forthbank Park
	Tonner 75'; Scoular 90'			Referee: J Grant

25 February 1928 League	Dumbarton	0–0	Third Lanark	Boghead Park
				Attendance: 3,000; Referee: R Seith

3 March 1928 League	Dumbarton	1–0	Queen of the South	Boghead Park
	Urquhart 60'			Referee: J Thomson

10 March 1928 League	East Fife	4–1	Dumbarton	Bayview Park, Methil
	Weir 56', 86'; Russell 85'		Urquhart	Referee: J McKay

17 March 1928 League	Dumbarton	6–1	East Stirling	Boghead Park
	Urquhart 20' 40'; Miller; Crawford 89'		Bowie	Referee: J Rowan

24 March 1928 League	Ayr United	0–1	Dumbarton	Somerset Park
			Urquhart 15'	Referee: W Jamieson

31 March 1928 League	Dumbarton	3–0	Dundee United	Boghead Park
	Urquhart 44' (pen.); Hamill 65', 70'			Attendance: 2,500; Referee: J McKay

7 April 1928 League	Dumbarton	6–2	Armadale	Boghead Park
	Urquhart 10' 15' 43' 46'; Hamill 88'		Junior 42'; Tonner 70' (pen.)	Referee: C McDonald

14 April 1928 League	Arbroath	3–0	Dumbarton	Gayfield Park
	Gentles 51', 56'; Warrander 68'			Attendance: 1,500; Referee: W Webb

21 April 1928 League	Dumbarton	4–1	Stenhousemuir	Boghead Park
	Urquhart 25' 60'; Kirk 70'		Robertson	Referee: J Leggatt

== Scottish Cup ==
Dumbarton were knocked out in the first round by Hamilton.

25 January 1928 Cup R1	Dumbarton	2–3	Hamilton	Boghead Park
	McLardie 80'; Gillies 94'		Toner 1'; Dick 20'; McKay 43'	Attendance: 2,500; Referee: R Innes

== Dumbartonshire Cup ==
Dumbarton were runners-up in the Dumbartonshire Cup for the fourth season running, losing out to Clydebank in the final.

18 February 1928 Semi Final	Dumbarton	7–2	Vale of Leven	Boghead Park
	Muir; Crawford; Harvie; Lamont; Murray		Goal	Attendance: 1,000

28 April 1928 Final	Clydebank	0–0	Dumbarton	Clydeholm Park
				Attendance: 1,000

30 April 1928 Final Replay	Clydebank	4–2	Dumbarton	Clydeholm Park
	Thomson; Chalmers		Crawford	Attendance: 1,000

== Player statistics ==
No.	Pos	Nat	Player	Total		Second Division		Scottish Cup	
No.	Pos	Nat	Player	Apps	Goals	Apps	Goals	Apps	Goals
	GK	(Scotland) SCO	Jock Bradford	14	0	13	0	1	0
	GK	(Scotland) SCO	Duncan Yuill	24	0	24	0	0	0
	DF	(Scotland) SCO	Alfred Aitchison	14	0	14	0	0	0
	DF	(Scotland) SCO	Daniel Muir	35	0	34	0	1	0
	DF	(Scotland) SCO	Robert Shaw	27	0	26	0	1	0
	MF	(Scotland) SCO	John Harvie	32	1	31	1	1	0
	MF	(Scotland) SCO	James Laing	12	0	12	0	0	0
	MF	(Scotland) SCO	Thomas Lamont	7	0	7	0	0	0
	MF	(Scotland) SCO	Andrew Mair	6	0	6	0	0	0
	MF	(Scotland) SCO	James Miller	38	2	37	2	1	0
	MF	(Scotland) SCO	John Muir	4	0	4	0	0	0
	MF	(Scotland) SCO	Rock	1	0	1	0	0	0
	MF	(Scotland) SCO	Watt	2	0	2	0	0	0
	MF	(Scotland) SCO	Trialist	3	0	3	0	0	0
	FW	(Scotland) SCO	Brown	1	0	1	0	0	0
	FW	(Scotland) SCO	James Crawford	35	9	34	9	1	0
	FW	(Scotland) SCO	Archibald Gillies	30	1	29	0	1	1
	FW	(Scotland) SCO	Andrew Hamill	10	3	10	3	0	0
	FW	(Scotland) SCO	William Kirk	37	5	36	5	1	0
	FW	(Scotland) SCO	Archibald McLardie	27	4	26	3	1	1
	FW	(Scotland) SCO	Donald MacPhail	12	1	11	1	1	0
	FW	(Scotland) SCO	William Murray	7	0	7	0	0	0
	FW	(Scotland) SCO	John Pearson	3	0	3	0	0	0
	FW	(Scotland) SCO	John Russell	12	6	12	6	0	0
	FW	(Scotland) SCO	Angus Urquhart	36	36	35	36	1	0

=== Transfers ===
==== Players in ====
Player	From	Date
(Scotland) James Laing	(Scotland) Vale of Leven	9 Jul 1927
(Scotland) James Miller	(Scotland) East Fife	13 Jul 1927
(Scotland) John Pesrson	(Scotland) Ayr United	18 Jul 1927
(Scotland) Alfred Aitchison	(Scotland) Benburb	8 Aug 1927
(Scotland) James Crawford	(Scotland) Vale of Leven	8 Aug 1927
(Scotland) Archibald McLardie	(Scotland) Vale of Leven	8 Aug 1927
(Scotland) Thomas Lamont	(Scotland) Renton Thistle	10 Aug 1927
(Scotland) William Kirk	(Scotland) Arthurlie	11 Aug 1927
(Scotland) Angus Urquhart	(Scotland) Dykehead	18 Aug 1927
(Scotland) Donald MacPhail	(Scotland) Dumbarton Academy FP	27 Aug 1927
(Scotland) Daniel Muir	(Scotland) St Bernards	31 Aug 1927
(Scotland) Archibald Gillies	(Scotland) St Mirren	4 Oct 1927
(Scotland) Robert Shaw	(Scotland) Alloa Athletic	14 Oct 1927
(Scotland) Jock Bradford	(Scotland) St Mirren	18 Jan 1928
(Scotland) Andrew Hamill	(Scotland) Albion Rovers	8 Apr 1928

==== Players out ====
Player	To	Date
(Scotland) Archibald Muir	(Scotland) Third Lanark	17 May 1927
(Scotland) Martin Davin	(England) Bury	19 Aug 1927
(Scotland) Duncan Yuill	(Scotland) Rangers	17 Jan 1928
(Scotland) John Cameron	(England) Huddersfield Town	
(Scotland) John Granger	(Northern Ireland) Ards	
(Scotland) James Reid	(Scotland) Vale of Leven	
(Scotland) John Swan	(Scotland) Nairn County	
(Scotland) Adam Swanson	(Scotland) Dumbarton Athletic	

In addition Alfred Aitchison, John Black, robert Dennett, George Greenshields and Robert Main all played their last games in Dumbarton 'colours'.
