= 1928–29 Dumbarton F.C. season =

Dumbarton
1928–1929 season
- Manager: Donald Colman
- Stadium: Boghead Park, Dumbarton
- Scottish League Division Two: 14th
- Scottish Cup: Third Round
- Top goalscorer: League: Johnny Haddow (11); All: Johnny Haddow (12)
| Home colours | Away colours |

The 1928–29 season was the 52nd Scottish football season in which Dumbarton competed at national level, entering the Scottish Football League and the Scottish Cup. In addition Dumbarton played in the Dumbartonshire Cup.

== Scottish League ==
With just two wins from their first 11 league games, Dumbarton's hopes for promotion in their seventh successive season in the Second Division was never going to be a real possibility. In the end Dumbarton finished 14th out of 19, with 31 points - 20 behind champions Dundee United.

| 11 August 1928 League | East Stirling | 1–0 | Dumbarton | Firs Park |
| | Docherty 1' | | | Attendance: 1,500; Referee: W Webb |

| 18 August 1928 League | Dumbarton | 4–1 | Alloa Athletic | Boghead Park |
| | Harvie 20'; Urquhart 20', 65'; Crawford 68' | | Ross 44' | Attendance: 2,000; Referee: W Dawson |

| 25 August 1928 League | Forfar Athletic | 1–1 | Dumbarton | Station Park, Forfar |
| | Kilgour 15' | | Reid 65' | Referee: J Mackay |

| 1 September 1928 League | Dumbarton | 3–3 | King's Park | Boghead Park |
| | Crawford 53' (pen.); Haddow; McLardie 75' | | Baird 55' (pen.); McGreachan 85'; Tonner 88' | Attendance: 2,000; Referee: J Robertson |

| 8 September 1928 League | Stenhousemuir | 1–0 | Dumbarton | Ochilview Park |
| | Howie 15' | | | Referee: H McLachlan |

| 15 September 1928 League | Dumbarton | 3–1 | Dunfermline Athletic | Boghead Park |
| | Crawford 10' (pen.); Malloy 30'; Harvie 32' | | Penman 44' | Attendance: 3,000; Referee: J Thomson |

| 22 September 1928 League | Arthurlie | 3–3 | Dumbarton | Dunterlie Park |
| | Clark 5' 15' | | Malloy; Crawford; Haddow 87' | Referee: J Hudson |

| 29 September 1928 League | Dumbarton | 0–2 | Arbroath | Boghead Park |
| | | | Farquhar 30'; Gibb 33' | Attendance: 2,000; Referee: C McGreachan |

| 6 October 1928 League | Bathgate | 2–3; VOID | Dumbarton | Mill Park, Bathgate |
| | McPherson 47'; Drummond 51' | | Reid 1'; Kirk 53', 57' | Attendance: 1,000; Referee: J Rowan |

| 13 October 1928 League | Dumbarton | 0–3 | Bo'ness | Boghead Park |
| | | | Haggerty 20', 30'; Junior 33' | Attendance: 2,000; Referee: J Thomson |

| 20 October 1928 League | Dumbarton | 1–1 | Clydebank | Boghead Park |
| | Crawford | | Thomson |

| 27 October 1928 League | Morton | 3–1 | Dumbarton | Cappielow Park |
| | McRorie 15', 53'; McCartney | | Orr 89' | Attendance: 7,000; Referee: J Prior |

| 3 November 1928 League | Dumbarton | 4–2 | Queen of the South | Boghead Park |
| | Crawford 43'; Reid 47'; Orr 57'; Haddow | | Lauderdale; Mackie 85' | Referee: H McLachlan |

| 10 November 1928 League | Leith Athletic | 3–0 | Dumbarton | Marine Gardens |
| | Marshall 5'; Johnston; Rae | | | Referee: J Mackay |

| 17 November 1928 League | Dumbarton | 1–0 | Albion Rovers | Boghead Park |
| | Crawford 25' | | | Referee: J Baillie |

| 24 November 1928 League | Dumbarton | 5–2 | Armadale | Boghead Park |
| | Haddow 22' (pen.); McIssac 47', 54', 60' | | Laird 5'; Heigh 69' | Referee: A Stewart |

| 1 December 1928 League | Dundee United | 3–1 | Dumbarton | Tannadice Park |
| | Hutchison 15', 20'; Henderson 45' (pen.) | | McIssac 21' | Attendance: 6,000; Referee: J Rowan |

| 8 December 1928 League | Dumbarton | 2–1 | St Bernard's | Boghead Park |
| | McIssac 20'; Gillies 46' | | Eadie 35' | Attendance: 1,500; Referee: D Reilly |

| 15 December 1928 League | East Fife | 6–3 | Dumbarton | Bayview Park, Methil |
| | McGaughy 1'; Brown; Nairn 80'; Weir 15'; Kyle | | McIssac; Gillies | Referee: W Webb |

| 22 December 1928 League | Alloa Athletic | 0–2 | Dumbarton | Recreation Park, Alloa |
| | | | Haddow 30'; McIssac | Attendance: 1,500; Referee: A McLean |

| 31 December 1928 League | Clydebank | 1–6 | Dumbarton | Clydeholm Park |
| | Thomson | | Kirk; Reid; Crawford; Haddow 85' | Attendance: 3,000; Referee: D Reilly |

| 2 January 1929 League | Dumbarton | 1–0 | Morton | Boghead Park |
| | Kirk 41' |

| 5 January 1929 League | Dumbarton | 0–0 | Forfar Athletic | Boghead Park |
| | | | | Attendance: 2,000; Referee: W Webb |

| 12 January 1929 League | King's Park | 1–1 | Dumbarton | Forthbank Park |
| | Connor 29' | | Kirk 16' | Attendance: 1,500; Referee: J Stewart |

| 26 January 1929 League | Dumbarton | 0–1 | Stenhousemuir | Boghead Park |
| | | | Kemp 43' | Referee: J Robertson |

| 9 February 1929 League | Dumbarton | 2–0 | Arthurlie | Boghead Park |
| | Malloy; Haddow | | | Referee: H McLachlan |

| 20 February 1929 League | Arbroath | 7–1 | Dumbarton | Gayfield Park |
| | Gibb 16', 20', 47', 84'; Gentles 18'; Gallacher 57', 90' | | Haddow 88' | Attendance: 1,200; Referee: J Leggatt |

| 23 February 1929 League | Dumbarton | 3–0; VOID | Bathgate | Boghead Park |
| | Kirk 10', 33', 80' | | | Referee: W Jamieson |

| 2 March 1929 League | Bo'ness | 6–0 | Dumbarton | Newtown Park, Bo'ness |
| | Ross 30'; Harvie (o.g.); Hutcheson 57'; Fleming 58', 70', 90' | | | Attendance: 1,500; Referee: J Black |

| 9 March 1929 League | Queen of the South | 3–0 | Dumbarton | Palmerston Park |
| | McKenna 20'; Derby 47'; Wright (pen.) | | | Referee: W Holborn |

| 16 March 1929 League | Dumbarton | 1–4 | Leith Athletic | Boghead Park |
| | Miller (pen.) | | Johnston; Laidlaw |

| 23 March 1929 League | Albion Rovers | 6–4 | Dumbarton | Cliftonhill |
| | Brant 52', 54'; Weir 67'; Rae 84' | | Crawford 4'; Haddow 7'<vr>Malloy 25'; Kirk 85' | Attendance: 2,000; Referee: R Seith |

| 30 March 1929 League | Armadale | 1–1 | Dumbarton | Volunteer Park, Armadale |
| | Young 41' | | Miller 63' | Referee: W Jamieson |

| 1 April 1929 League | Dunfermline Athletic | 3–2 | Dumbarton | East End Park |
| | Dickson, T Syme; Daid | | King (o.g.); Craig | Referee: J Pryor |

| 6 April 1929 League | Dumbarton | 1–1 | Dundee United | Boghead Park |
| | Urquhart 42' | | Kay 44' | Attendance: 1,000; Referee: J Thomson |

| 8 April 1929 League | Dumbarton | 3–2 | East Stirling | Boghead Park |
| | Urquhart 20' (pen.); Kirk | | Campbell; Junior 48' | Referee: W Dobson |

| 20 April 1929 League | St Bernard's | 3–0 | Dumbarton | Royal Gymnasium Ground |
| | Eadie 47'; Walker 70' | | | Referee: J Leggatt |

| 27 April 1929 League | Dumbarton | 2–2 | East Fife | Boghead Park |
| | Speedie 75'; Crawford 83' | | Weir 12', 16' (pen.) | Referee: J Smith |

== Scottish Cup ==
Dumbarton reached the third round before losing out to Raith Rovers.

| 19 January 1929 Cup R1 | Dumbarton | 6–1 | Inverness Citadel | Boghead Park |
| | Orr 30'; Harvie 65'; McLardie; Kirk; Malloy | | Cumming 32' | Attendance: 2,000; Referee: J Leggatt |

| 2 February 1929 Cup R2 | Fraserburgh | 0–3 | Dumbarton | Bellslea Park |
| | | | Malloy 60', 80', 89' | Attendance: 1,500; Referee: J Russell |

| 16 February 1929 Cup R3 | Raith Rovers | 3–2 | Dumbarton | Starks Park |
| | Galloway 12'; McBain 37'; Brunton 45' | | Haddow 35'; Malloy | Attendance: 5,000; Referee: R Innes |

== Dumbartonshire Cup ==
Dumbarton were runners-up in the Dumbartonshire Cup for the fifth season running, again losing out to Clydebank in the final.

| 24 April 1929 Final | Clydebank | 1–0 | Dumbarton | Clydeholm Park |
| | Chalmers | | | Attendance: 1,000; Referee: W Holborn |

== Player statistics ==
| No. | Pos | Nat | Player | Total | | Second Division | | Scottish Cup | |
| No. | Pos | Nat | Player | Apps | Goals | Apps | Goals | Apps | Goals |
|---|---|---|---|---|---|---|---|---|---|
| | GK | (Scotland) SCO | Blackstock | 4 | 0 | 4 | 0 | 0 | 0 |
| | GK | (Scotland) SCO | Jock Bradford | 35 | 0 | 32 | 0 | 3 | 0 |
| | GK | (Scotland) SCO | Albert Ferguson | 1 | 0 | 1 | 0 | 0 | 0 |
| | DF | (Scotland) SCO | William Gibson | 1 | 0 | 1 | 0 | 0 | 0 |
| | DF | (Scotland) SCO | Daniel Muir | 38 | 0 | 35 | 0 | 3 | 0 |
| | DF | (Scotland) SCO | Robert Orr | 33 | 3 | 30 | 2 | 3 | 1 |
| | DF | (Scotland) SCO | Robert Shaw | 5 | 0 | 5 | 0 | 0 | 0 |
| | MF | (Scotland) SCO | Craig | 3 | 1 | 3 | 1 | 0 | 0 |
| | MF | (Scotland) SCO | Cunningham | 1 | 0 | 1 | 0 | 0 | 0 |
| | MF | (Scotland) SCO | John Harvie | 35 | 4 | 32 | 2 | 3 | 2 |
| | MF | (Scotland) SCO | James Miller | 38 | 2 | 35 | 2 | 3 | 0 |
| | MF | (Scotland) SCO | Neish | 3 | 0 | 3 | 0 | 0 | 0 |
| | MF | (Scotland) SCO | Hugh Reid | 17 | 4 | 17 | 4 | 0 | 0 |
| | FW | (Scotland) SCO | James Crawford | 35 | 10 | 32 | 10 | 3 | 0 |
| | FW | (Scotland) SCO | Archibald Gillies | 35 | 2 | 33 | 2 | 2 | 0 |
| | FW | (Scotland) SCO | Johnny Haddow | 37 | 12 | 34 | 11 | 3 | 1 |
| | FW | (Scotland) SCO | John Jackson | 1 | 0 | 1 | 0 | 0 | 0 |
| | FW | (Scotland) SCO | William Kirk | 28 | 6 | 25 | 5 | 3 | 1 |
| | FW | (England) ENG | William Molloy | 20 | 9 | 17 | 4 | 3 | 5 |
| | FW | (Scotland) SCO | Alex McIsaac | 13 | 8 | 12 | 8 | 1 | 0 |
| | FW | (Scotland) SCO | Archibald McLardie | 37 | 2 | 34 | 1 | 3 | 1 |
| | FW | (Scotland) SCO | Robert Speedie | 1 | 1 | 1 | 1 | 0 | 0 |
| | FW | (Scotland) SCO | Angus Urquhart | 8 | 5 | 8 | 5 | 0 | 0 |

=== Transfers ===
==== Players in ====
| Player | From | Date |
|---|---|---|
| (Scotland) John Jackson | (Scotland) Renton Juveniles | 1 May 1928 |
| (Scotland) Johnny Haddow | (Scotland) Rangers | 22 May 1928 |
| (Scotland) Robert Orr | (England) Crystal Palace | 6 Sep 1928 |
| (England) William Molloy | (Scotland) Celtic | 7 Sep 1928 |
| (Scotland) Alex McIssac | | 24 Nov 1928 |
| (Scotland) Benjamin Swanson | (Scotland) Rothesay Royal Victoria | 17 Jan 1929 |
| (Scotland) Robert Speedie | | 25 Apr 1929 |

==== Players out ====
| Player | To | Date |
|---|---|---|
| (Scotland) James Reid | (Scotland) Freed | 20 May 1928 |
| (Scotland) James Warden | (Scotland) Freed | 20 May 1928 |

In addition Andrew Hamill, James Laing, Thomas Lamont, Andrew Mair, William Murray, John Pearson and John Russell all played their last games in Dumbarton 'colours'.
