= George Anderson =

George Anderson may refer to:

== Arts and entertainment ==
- George Frederick Anderson (1793–1876), British violinist and Master of the Queen's Music
- George Edward Anderson (1860–1928), American photographer
- George Anderson (actor) (1886–1948), American actor
- George Anderson (musician), English bass guitar player with Shakatak
- George Anderson (Peyton Place), fictional character on the television drama Peyton Place

== Military ==
- George T. Anderson (1824–1901), American Confederate general
- George B. Anderson (1831–1862), American Confederate general
- George Wayne Anderson (1839–1906), officer in the Confederate States Army
- George Whelan Anderson Jr. (1906–1992), American admiral and diplomat
- George K. Anderson (fl. 1970s–1990s), American air force major general

== Politics and law ==
=== United Kingdom ===
- George Anderson (accountant-general) (1760–1796), English accountant-general to the Board of Control
- George William Anderson (1791–1857), British colonial governor
- George Anderson (MP) (1819–1896), British politician, MP for Glasgow
- George Knox Anderson (1854–1941), British politician, MP for Canterbury

=== United States ===
- George Anderson (Mississippi politician) (1856–1926)
- George Edwin Anderson (1891–1961), American businessman and politician
- George Washington Anderson (1832–1902), United States Representative from Missouri
- George A. Anderson (1853–1896), United States Representative from Illinois
- George W. Anderson (judge) (1861–1938), American lawyer and federal judge
- George Wayne Anderson (politician) (1863–1922), American jurist, Virginia state senator
- G. Ross Anderson (1929–2020), United States federal judge

=== Elsewhere ===
- George Anderson (Canadian politician), British Columbia MLA
- George Campbell Anderson (active 1831–1877), Bahamian judge in the Bahamas, Ceylon, and the Leeward Islands
- George William Anderson (Canadian politician) (1836–1909), English-born farmer, baker and political figure in British Columbia
- George Anderson (Australian politician) (1844–1919), New South Wales politician
- George James Anderson (1860–1935), New Zealand Member of Parliament

== Religion ==
- George Anderson (minister) (1677–1756), Scottish clergyman
- George Nathanael Anderson (1883–1953), American Lutheran pastor
- George Wishart Anderson (1913–2002), British theologian
- H. George Anderson (born 1932), American bishop of the Evangelical Lutheran Church in America

== Sports ==
=== Association football (soccer) ===
- Geordie Anderson (fl. 1892–1904), Scottish footballer (Blackburn Rovers, Blackpool FC)
- George Anderson (footballer, born 1877) (1877–1930), Scottish footballer (Kilmarnock FC, national team)
- George Anderson (footballer, born 1879) (1879–1962), English footballer (Birmingham FC, Brentford FC)
- George Anderson (footballer, born 1887) (1887–1956), English football player (Sunderland AFC, Aberdeen FC) and manager (Dundee FC)
- George Anderson (soccer executive) (1890–1985), Canadian soccer executive
- George Anderson (footballer, born 1891) (1891–1959), English footballer (Manchester United)
- George Anderson (Canadian soccer) (1900–1975), Canadian soccer player
- George Anderson (footballer, born 1904) (1904–1974), Scottish footballer (Norwich City, Bury FC, Huddersfield Town, Mansfield Town)
- George Anderson (footballer, born 1953), Scottish footballer (Morton, Airdrieonians)
- George Anderson (New Zealand footballer) (1896–1978), New Zealand international football (soccer) player

=== Other sports ===
- George Anderson (cricketer) (1826–1902), English cricketer
- George Anderson (mountaineer) (1839–1884), Scottish mountaineer
- George Anderson (Australian footballer, born 1885) (1885–1958), Australian rules footballer (Collingwood)
- George Anderson (Australian footballer, born 1886) (1886–1976), Australian rules footballer (South Melbourne, University)
- George Anderson (baseball) (1889–1962), American baseball player
- Sparky Anderson (George Lee Anderson, 1934–2010), American baseball manager
- George Anderson (sprinter) (1943–2013), American sprinter
- George Anderson (sprinter, born 1916), American sprinter, 2nd in the 200 m at the 1935 USA Outdoor Track and Field Championships
- George Anderson (swimmer), Scottish swimmer

== Others ==
- George Anderson (mathematician) (fl. 1736–1740), English mathematician
- George Anderson (educator) (1876–1943), British schoolteacher and educational administrator in India
- George Anderson (criminal) (1880–1925), American bank robber
- George Anderson (merchant) (1767–1847), American businessman

== See also ==
- George Andersen (1900–1965), Danish-American lawyer
- Georg Andersson (born 1936), Swedish politician
