= George W. Anderson =

George W. Anderson may refer to:

- George W. Anderson (judge) (1861–1937), American jurist, federal judge from Massachusetts
- George Washington Anderson (1832–1902), American lawyer, U.S. congressman for Missouri
- George Wayne Anderson Jr. (1839–1906), Confederate officer
- George Wayne Anderson (politician) (1863–1922), American jurist, Virginia state senator
- George Whelan Anderson Jr. (1906–1992), American admiral, Chief of Naval Operations

== See also ==
- George Anderson (disambiguation)
