= Jim Holmes (footballer) =

Scottish footballer (born 1954)

Jimmy Holmes
Personal information
- Full name: James Black Holmes
- Date of birth: 8 December 1954 (age 71)
- Place of birth: Hamilton, Scotland
- Position: Left back

Youth career
- Muirkirk

Senior career*
Years	Team	Apps	(Gls)
1974–1976	Partick Thistle	0	(0)
1976–1988	Greenock Morton	437	(7)
1988–1990	Falkirk	53	(0)
1990	Alloa Athletic	8	(0)
1990–1991	Arbroath	37	(0)
Total		535	(7)
- * Club domestic league appearances and goals as of 20 February 2011

James Black Holmes (born 8 December 1954) is a Scottish former footballer.

== Career ==
Holmes began his career at junior club Muirkirk, before moving into the senior game with Partick Thistle before becoming a legend at Greenock Morton. He won three Scottish First Division winners medals: 1977–78, 1983–84 and 1986–87. In May 1987, after being voted the SPFA First Division Footballer of the Year, he captained the Scottish semi-professionals in an end of season tournament against Holland, England & Italy.

He finished off his career with spells at Falkirk, Alloa Athletic and Arbroath, where he was player/coach for a season before retiring in 1991.

== Personal life ==
His son Graeme Holmes is also a footballer who played for several clubs, including Morton.

== See also ==
- List of footballers in Scotland by number of league appearances (500+)
