= Donald MacPhail =

Donald MacPhail may refer to:

- Donald MacPhail (footballer)
- Donald MacPhail (tennis)
