= John Buchanan (footballer, born 1899) =

Scottish footballer (1894–1947)

Personal information
- Date of birth: 25 February 1894
- Place of birth: Paisley, Scotland
- Date of death: 3 October 1947 (aged 53)
- Position: Right half

Senior career*
Years	Team	Apps	(Gls)
1918–1919	Johnstone		
1919–1921	St Mirren	48	(17)
1921–1927	Greenock Morton	200	(31)
1927–1931	Rangers	96	(3)
1931–1932	Linfield		
1932–1933	East Stirlingshire	24	(0)

International career
1929–1930	Scotland	2	(0)
- * Club domestic league appearances and goals

John Buchanan (25 February 1894 – 3 October 1947) was a Scottish professional footballer.

== Playing career ==
Buchanan was a versatile player who settled at right half, but could also play at the back or in attack. He started with Johnstone (then a senior team) and moved to St Mirren in 1919, and then to Morton in the summer of 1921. With regular centre-forward George French absent through injury, he led the attack in the Greenock club's surprise Scottish Cup victory of 1922, defeating Rangers 1–0 in the final.

He stayed at Cappielow until December 1927, by which time Morton had been relegated from the top division, then joined Rangers who at that time were dominating Scottish football. He soon won further honours, including the next four Scottish Football League championships, two Charity Cups, a Glasgow Cup and the Scottish Cup in 1928 and 1930; the 1929 final, however, would be remembered for Buchanan being sent off in the defeat by Kilmarnock.

He moved to Linfield in Northern Ireland for the 1931–32 season, winning another League medal and reaching the Irish Cup Final, then played out a last season with East Stirlingshire before retiring in 1933. He had a grocery business, but died relatively young in 1947.
