= G. Anderson =

G. Anderson may refer to:

- Galusha Anderson (1832–1918), American theologian
- Gary Anderson (motorsport) (born 1951), former Formula One racing car designer
- George Anderson (disambiguation), various people
  - George Frederick Anderson (1793–1876), British musician and Master of the Queen's Music
- Geraint Anderson (born 1972), British analyst and columnist
- Gerald Anderson (born 1989), Filipino celebrity
- Gerry Anderson (1929–2012), British television producer and puppeteer
- Gillian Anderson (born 1968), American actress
- Glenn Anderson (born 1960), Canadian ice hockey player
