= Allan McGraw =

Scottish football player and manager (1939–2023)

Personal information
- Date of birth: 29 July 1939
- Place of birth: Govan, Glasgow
- Date of death: 1 March 2023 (aged 83)
- Position: Forward

Youth career
- Renfrew

Senior career*
Years	Team	Apps	(Gls)
1961–1966	Morton	136	(117)
1966–1969	Hibernian	60	(18)
1967	→ Toronto City (guest)	11	(1)
1969–1970	Linfield	20	(8)
1970–1971	Morton	0	(0)
Total		227	(144)

Managerial career
- 1985–1997: Greenock Morton
- * Club domestic league appearances and goals

Allan McGraw (29 July 1939 – 1 March 2023) was a Scottish football player and manager, most associated with Greenock Morton.

== Playing career ==
McGraw started his playing career with Greenock Morton. Playing in Division Two he set a Scottish record for most goals scored in a season. He finished as Morton's top goalscorer in five consecutive seasons, and appeared in the 1963 League Cup final. He helped the club to promotion to the top flight in 1964, having scored a record 61 goals in 52 appearances that season. It was the first time Morton had played at that level since 1952, but two seasons later the Ton were relegated back to the Second Division.

Following that relegation, Morton sold McGraw to Hibernian for £15,000 (£244,000 today). He scored eight goals in his first 11 appearances for Hibs, including wins against Hearts and Rangers. McGraw scored a goal which meant that the club reached the 1969 League Cup final, but he was unable to play in the final due to injury. McGraw had been stretchered off during the semi-final, but later returned to the field as Hibs had already used their one permitted substitute. He took a number of pain killing injections in order to play while injured. This ruined his knees, causing great pain and necessitating the use of walking sticks for the rest of his life. He later played for Linfield for one season and spent a season back at Morton without appearing in a league match.

== Managerial career ==
McGraw returned to Morton as manager in 1985. Players he managed included Derek McInnes, John Anderson, David Wylie and Alan Mahood. Towards the end of his time as manager, McGraw's team missed promotion to the Scottish Premier Division by one goal in the 1995-96 season.

== Personal life and death ==
McGraw stood for election as an independent for West Renfrewshire in the 1999 Scottish Parliament election. His son Mark also played for both Morton and Hibs.

McGraw died on 1 March 2023, at the age of 83.

== Honours ==
=== Player ===
Morton

- Scottish Division Two: 1963–64

Individual

- Scottish Division Two top scorer: 1963–64

=== Manager ===
Greenock Morton

- Scottish First Division: 1986–87
- Scottish Second Division: 1994–95

Individual

- Scottish First Division Manager of the Year: 1986–87
- Scottish PFA Second Division Manager of the Year: 1994–95

=== Lifetime achievement ===
- Scottish Football Hall of Fame inductee: 2017
- Scottish PFA Special Merit Award: 1998
