= 2025–26 Greenock Morton F.C. season =

Greenock Morton
2025–26 season
- Manager: Dougie Imrie (until 25 November 2025); Ian Murray (from 2 January 2026)
- Stadium: Cappielow
- Scottish Championship: 8th
- Scottish Cup: Fourth round
- League Cup: Second round
- Challenge Cup: Second round
- Top goalscorer: League: Eamonn Brophy (6); All: Tomi Adeloye (7)
- Highest home attendance: 4,885 v Aberdeen (16 August 2025, League Cup)
- Lowest home attendance: 1,080 v Stenhousemuir (15 July 2025, League Cup)
- Average home league attendance: 1,918
- Biggest win: 3–0 v Stenhousemuir (Home, 15 July 2025, League Cup); 3–0 v Clyde (Home, 26 July 2025, League Cup); 3–0 v Ross County (Away, 15 November 2025, Scottish Championship)
- Biggest defeat: 0–5 v St Johnstone (Away, 20 December 2025, Scottish Championship)

The 2025–26 was Greenock Morton's 11th consecutive season in the Scottish Championship after being promoted from League One in the 2014–15 season. Greenock Morton are also competed in the Scottish Cup, League Cup, and Challenge Cup.

== Squad ==
Squad at end of season

Note: Flags indicate national team as defined under FIFA eligibility rules; some limited exceptions apply. Players may hold more than one non-FIFA nationality.

| No. | Pos. | Nation | Player |
|---|---|---|---|
| 1 | GK | IRL | James Storer |
| 2 | DF | SCO | Cammy Ballantyne |
| 3 | DF | IRL | Zak Delaney |
| 6 | DF | ENG | Kris Moore |
| 7 | FW | SCO | Owen Moffat |
| 8 | MF | SCO | Cameron Blues |
| 9 | FW | ENG | Curtis Main (on loan from Ayr United) |
| 10 | FW | SCO | Eamonn Brophy |
| 11 | MF | SCO | Ali Crawford |
| 12 | MF | ENG | Kian Taylor |
| 14 | FW | SCO | Zak McKay |
| 17 | MF | SCO | Cammy MacPherson |
| 18 | FW | SCO | Michael Garrity |

| No. | Pos. | Nation | Player |
|---|---|---|---|
| 19 | MF | SCO | Kerr Robertson |
| 20 | DF | SCO | Aaron Comrie |
| 21 | MF | SCO | Grant Gillespie (captain) |
| 22 | FW | ENG | Nathan Shaw |
| 23 | DF | SCO | Jackson Longridge |
| 24 | MF | SCO | Arron Lyall (on loan from Ross County) |
| 25 | DF | SCO | Fergus Owens |
| 26 | DF | ENG | Reuben Lopata-White (on loan from Leeds United) |
| 27 | MF | SCO | Iain Wilson |
| 28 | MF | SCO | Louie Murphy |
| 29 | FW | SCO | Michael O'Halloran |
| 31 | GK | SCO | Murray Johnson (on loan from Hibernian) |
| 41 | GK | SCO | Sam Murdoch |

== Results and fixtures ==
Win Draw Loss Postponed

=== Scottish Championship ===
| 2 August 2025 1 | Greenock Morton | 0–0 | Dunfermline Athletic | Greenock |
| 15:00 | | Report | | Stadium: Cappielow; Attendance: 2,497; Referee: Dan McFarlane |

| 9 August 2025 2 | Partick Thistle | 1–1 | Greenock Morton | Glasgow |
| 15:00 | Chalmers 50' (pen.) | Report | Crawford 33' | Stadium: Firhill Stadium; Attendance: 3,926; Referee: Calum Scott |

| 23 August 2025 3 | Greenock Morton | 2–2 | Ayr United | Greenock |
| 15:00 | Brophy 23' (pen.), 87' | Report | Holt 55'; McAllister 59' | Stadium: Cappielow; Attendance: 1,877; Referee: Don Robertson |

| 30 August 2025 4 | St Johnstone | 1–1 | Greenock Morton | Perth |
| 15:00 | McPake 83' | Report | Brophy 22' | Stadium: McDiarmid Park; Attendance: 3,548; Referee: Grant Irvine |

| 6 September 2025 5 | Greenock Morton | 0–1 | Raith Rovers | Greenock |
| 15:00 | | Report | Easton 52' | Stadium: Cappielow; Attendance: 2,004; Referee: Lloyd Wilson |

| 13 September 2025 6 | Queen's Park | 0–0 | Greenock Morton | Glasgow |
| 15:00 | | Report | | Stadium: Lesser Hampden; Attendance: 897; Referee: Ross Hardie |

| 20 September 2025 7 | Arbroath | 1–1 | Greenock Morton | Arbroath |
| 15:00 | Marshall 55' | Report | Longridge 80' | Stadium: Gayfield Park; Attendance: 1,244; Referee: Iain Snedden |

| 27 September 2025 8 | Greenock Morton | 1–1 | Ross County | Greenock |
| 15:00 | Blues 73' | Report | Hale 18' (pen.) | Stadium: Cappielow; Attendance: 1,450; Referee: Dan McFarlane |

| 4 October 2025 9 | Airdrieonians | 1–2 | Greenock Morton | Airdrie |
| 15:00 | Henderson 52' | Report | Connelly 49' (o.g.); Longridge 83' | Stadium: Excelsior Stadium; Attendance: 1,433; Referee: Steven McLean |

| 11 October 2025 10 | Greenock Morton | 1–1 | Partick Thistle | Greenock |
| 15:00 | Adeloye 23' | Report | Samuel 90+3' | Stadium: Cappielow; Attendance: 2,883; Referee: Kevin Clancy |

| 18 October 2025 11 | Ayr United | 2–1 | Greenock Morton | Ayr |
| 15:00 | Rus 45'; Dempsey 87' | Report | Ballantyne 76' | Stadium: Somerset Park; Attendance: 2,135; Referee: Iain Snedden |

| 25 October 2025 12 | Greenock Morton | 0–4 | St Johnstone | Greenock |
| 15:00 | | Report | Diabate 5'; Gullan 12', 34'; McPake 26' | Stadium: Cappielow; Attendance: 2,068; Referee: Euan Anderson |

| 1 November 2025 13 | Raith Rovers | 1–1 | Greenock Morton | Kirkcaldy |
| 15:00 | Hamilton 39' | Report | Moore 90' | Stadium: Stark's Park; Attendance: 3,141; Referee: Colin Steven |

| 8 November 2025 14 | Greenock Morton | 1–0 | Arbroath | Greenock |
| 15:00 | Moore 31' | Report | | Stadium: Cappielow; Attendance: 1,672; Referee: Peter Stuart |

| 15 November 2025 15 | Ross County | 0–3 | Greenock Morton | Dingwall |
| 15:00 | | Report | Shaw 20'; MacPherson 58'; Garrity 77' | Stadium: Victoria Park; Attendance: 2,803; Referee: Euan Anderson |

| 22 November 2025 16 | Dunfermline Athletic | 1–0 | Greenock Morton | Dunfermline |
| 15:00 | Gilmour 16' | Report | | Stadium: East End Park; Attendance: 4,989; Referee: Colin Steven |

| 5 December 2025 17 | Greenock Morton | 2–1 | Queen's Park | Greenock |
| 19:45 | Adeloye 43' (pen.); O'Halloran 90+2' | Report | Connolly 45' | Stadium: Cappielow; Attendance: 1,150; Referee: Peter Stuart |

| 13 December 2025 18 | Greenock Morton | 0–1 | Airdrieonians | Greenock |
| 15:00 | | Report | McGinty 62' | Stadium: Cappielow; Attendance: 1,251; Referee: Chris Graham |

| 20 December 2025 19 | St Johnstone | 5–0 | Greenock Morton | Perth |
| 15:00 | McPake 12'; Stanton 24'; Gullan 39', 70'; Sidibeh 76' | Report | | Stadium: McDiarmid Park; Attendance: 4,363; Referee: Colin Steven |

| 27 December 2025 20 | Greenock Morton | 1–1 | Ayr United | Greenock |
| 15:00 | Lyall 47' | Report | Dowds 25' | Stadium: Cappielow; Attendance: 1,811; Referee: Ross Hardie |

| 3 January 2026 21 | Partick Thistle | 3–2 | Greenock Morton | Glasgow |
| 15:00 | Stanway 50'; Turner 77'; Watt 90+4' | Report | Garrity 22'; Brophy 44' | Stadium: Firhill Stadium; Attendance: 3,741; Referee: Sean Murdoch |

| 23 January 2026 22 | Arbroath | 1–1 | Greenock Morton | Arbroath |
| 19:45 | Muirhead 58' | Report | Garrity 74' | Stadium: Gayfield Park; Attendance: 1,211; Referee: Ryan Lee |

| 31 January 2026 23 | Greenock Morton | 2–1 | Ross County | Greenock |
| 15:00 | Brophy 19'; O'Halloran 67' | Report | Iacovitti 89' | Stadium: Cappielow; Attendance: 1,657; Referee: Grant Irvine |

| 14 February 2026 24 | Greenock Morton | 0–0 | Raith Rovers | Greenock |
| 15:00 | | Report | | Stadium: Cappielow; Attendance: 1,798; Referee: Iain Snedden |

| 17 February 2026 25 | Greenock Morton | 2–0 | Dunfermline Athletic | Greenock |
| 19:45 | Brophy 22'; MacPherson 65' (pen.) | Report | Ngwenya (red card) 53' | Stadium: Cappielow; Attendance: 1,559; Referee: Greg Soutar |

| 21 February 2026 26 | Queen's Park | 3–2 | Greenock Morton | Glasgow |
| 15:00 | Todorov 8'; Fieldson 62'; Connolly 75' | Report | Shiels 3' (o.g.); Wilson 72' | Stadium: Lesser Hampden; Attendance: 836; Referee: Lloyd Wilson |

| 28 February 2026 27 | Airdrieonians | 3–1 | Greenock Morton | Airdrie |
| 15:00 | Thomas 16', 47'; McArthur 85' | Report | Garrity 10' | Stadium: Excelsior Stadium; Attendance: 1,519; Referee: Grant Irvine |

| 7 March 2026 28 | Greenock Morton | 0–2 | St Johnstone | Greenock |
| 15:00 | | Report | McAlear 79'; Smith 88' | Stadium: Cappielow; Attendance: 1,798; Referee: Duncan Nicolson |

| 13 March 2026 29 | Greenock Morton | 1–2 | Partick Thistle | Greenock |
| 19:45 | MacPherson 22'; Lopata-White (red card) 37' | Report | Stanway 38' (pen.); Samuel 90' | Stadium: Cappielow; Attendance: 1,976; Referee: Ross Hardie |

| 21 March 2026 30 | Ayr United | 0–1 | Greenock Morton | Ayr |
| 15:00 | | Report | Comrie 3' | Stadium: Somerset Park; Attendance: 1,875; Referee: Sean Murdoch |

| 28 March 2026 31 | Greenock Morton | 2–1 | Arbroath | Greenock |
| 13:00 | Moffat 17'; Main 32' | Report | Marshall 37' | Stadium: Cappielow; Attendance: 1,536; Referee: Calum Scott |

| 4 April 2026 32 | Dunfermline Athletic | 3–1 | Greenock Morton | Dunfermline |
| 15:00 | A.Tod 48'; Ngwenya 52'; M.Todd 66' | Report | Blues 36' | Stadium: East End Park; Attendance: 5,037; Referee: Colin Steven |

| 11 April 2026 33 | Raith Rovers | 3–2 | Greenock Morton | Kirkcaldy |
| 15:00 | Nsio 60'; Cameron 66'; Doherty 84' | Report | Blues 44'; Shaw 74' | Stadium: Stark's Park; Attendance: 3,132; Referee: Lloyd Wilson |

| 18 April 2026 34 | Greenock Morton | 0–0 | Queen's Park | Greenock |
| 15:00 | | Report | Martin (red card) 57' | Stadium: Cappielow; Attendance: 1,881; Referee: Steven McLean |

| 25 April 2026 35 | Ross County | 4–0 | Greenock Morton | Dingwall |
| 15:00 | Wright 10'; White 19'; Chilvers 49'; Duncan 80' | Report | | Stadium: Victoria Park; Attendance: 3,014; Referee: Calum Scott |

| 1 May 2026 36 | Greenock Morton | 1–1 | Airdrieonians | Greenock |
| 19:45 | Main 72' | Report | Henderson 48' | Stadium: Cappielow; Attendance: 3,652; Referee: Nick Walsh |

=== Scottish League Cup ===
==== Group stage ====
| 12 July 2025 1 | Peterhead | 2–4 | Greenock Morton | Peterhead |
| 15:00 | Colloty 37' (pen.); Ross 85' | Report | Blues 21'; Moore 43'; Crawford 58'; Delaney 77' | Stadium: Balmoor Stadium; Attendance: 660; Referee: Joel Kennedy |

| 15 July 2025 2 | Greenock Morton | 3–0 | Stenhousemuir | Greenock |
| 19:45 | Adeloye 7', 45+3'; Moffat 43' | Report | | Stadium: Cappielow; Attendance: 1,080; Referee: Peter Stuart |

| 22 July 2025 3 | Motherwell | 3–0 | Greenock Morton | Motherwell |
| 19:45 | Slattery (yellow card) 34'; Stamatelopoulos 52'; Maswanhise 83', 90+3' | Report | Longridge (yellow card) 21'; Moffat (yellow card) 29' | Stadium: Fir Park; Attendance: 3,255; Referee: Ryan Lee |

| 26 July 2025 4 | Greenock Morton | 3–0 | Clyde | Greenock |
| 15:00 | Robertson 12'; Adeloye 45+2' (pen.); Longridge 84' | Report | | Stadium: Cappielow; Attendance: 1,293; Referee: Steven McLean |

==== Knockout phase ====
| 16 August 2025 Second round | Greenock Morton | 0–3 | Aberdeen | Greenock |
| 15:00 | | Report | Heltne Nilsen 32'; Yengi 37'; Clarkson 79' | Stadium: Cappielow; Attendance: 4,885; Referee: Matthew MacDermid |

=== Scottish Challenge Cup ===
| 9 December 2025 Second round | Stirling Albion F.C. | 2–2 (5–4 p) | Greenock Morton | Stirling |
| 19:45 | McNab 33'; McLean 45' | Report | Shaw 5' (pen.); Robertson 34' | Stadium: Forthbank Stadium; Attendance: 291; Referee: Duncan Nicolson |
| | Penalties |
| | McLean (penalty scored); Cunningham (penalty scored); McNab (penalty scored); Banner (penalty scored); Carse (penalty scored) | | (penalty scored) Moffat; (penalty scored) Wilson; (penalty scored) MacPherson; (penalty scored) Garrity; (penalty missed) Ballantyne |

=== Scottish Cup ===
| 29 November 2025 Third round | Peterhead | 2–2 (a.e.t.) (3–5 p) | Greenock Morton | Peterhead |
| 15:00 | McGinn 41'; Shanks 90+5' | Report | Adeloye 48', 60' (pen.) | Stadium: Balmoor Stadium; Attendance: 609; Referee: Calum Scott |
| | Penalties |
| | McCarthy (penalty scored); McGuffie (penalty scored); Jason Brown (penalty missed); Shanks (penalty scored) | | (penalty scored) Shaw; (penalty scored) Moore; (penalty scored) MacPherson; (penalty scored) Longridge; (penalty scored) Ballantyne |

| 17 January 2026 Fourth round | Stenhousemuir | 4–0 | Greenock Morton | Stenhousemuir |
| 15:00 | N.Jamieson 39'; Aitken 45', 80'; Buchanan 65' | Report | | Stadium: Ochilview Park; Attendance: 838; Referee: Euan Anderson |

== Team statistics ==
=== League table ===
| Pos | Team | Pld | W | D | L | GF | GA | GD | Pts | Promotion, qualification or relegation |
|---|---|---|---|---|---|---|---|---|---|---|
| 6 | Queen's Park | 36 | 9 | 14 | 13 | 35 | 48 | −13 | 41 | |
| 7 | Ayr United | 36 | 8 | 15 | 13 | 38 | 47 | −9 | 39 | |
| 8 | Greenock Morton | 36 | 8 | 14 | 14 | 36 | 52 | −16 | 38 | |
| 9 | Airdrieonians (R) | 36 | 8 | 12 | 16 | 35 | 49 | −14 | 36 | Qualification for the Championship play-offs |
| 10 | Ross County (R) | 36 | 8 | 10 | 18 | 36 | 57 | −21 | 34 | Relegation to League One |

Rules for classification: 1) Points; 2) Goal difference; 3) Goals scored; 4) Head-to head points; 5) Head-to-head goal difference; 6) Play-off (only for deciding promotion, play-off participation and relegation).
(R) Relegated

=== League Cup table ===
| Pos | Team | Pld | W | PW | PL | L | GF | GA | GD | Pts | Qualification | MOT | GMO | CLY | STE | PET |
|---|---|---|---|---|---|---|---|---|---|---|---|---|---|---|---|---|
| 1 | Motherwell | 4 | 3 | 1 | 0 | 0 | 8 | 3 | +5 | 11 | Qualification for the second round | — | 3–0 | — | — | 2–1 |
| 2 | Greenock Morton | 4 | 3 | 0 | 0 | 1 | 10 | 5 | +5 | 9 | Qualification for the second round | — | — | 3–0 | 3–0 | — |
| 3 | Clyde | 4 | 1 | 1 | 1 | 1 | 6 | 8 | −2 | 6 | | 2–2p | — | — | p2–2 | — |
| 4 | Stenhousemuir | 4 | 1 | 0 | 1 | 2 | 3 | 6 | −3 | 4 | | 0–1 | — | — | — | 1–0 |
| 5 | Peterhead | 4 | 0 | 0 | 0 | 4 | 4 | 9 | −5 | 0 | | — | 2–4 | 1–2 | — | — |

Rules for classification: 1) goal difference, 2) goals scored, 3) away goals scored, 4) matches won, 5) away matches won, 6) drawing of lots.

=== Competition overview ===
| Competition | First match | Last match | Starting round | Final position | Record | | | | | | | |
| Competition | First match | Last match | Starting round | Final position | Pld | W | D | L | GF | GA | GD | Win % |
|---|---|---|---|---|---|---|---|---|---|---|---|---|
| Scottish Championship | 2 August 2025 | 1 May 2026 | Matchday 1 | 8th | 36 | 8 | 14 | 14 | 36 | 52 | −16 | 22.22 |
| Scottish Cup | 29 November 2025 | 17 January 2026 | Third round | Fourth round | 2 | 0 | 1 | 1 | 2 | 6 | −4 | 0.00 |
| League Cup | 12 July 2025 | 16 August 2025 | Group stage | Second round | 5 | 3 | 0 | 2 | 10 | 8 | +2 | 60.00 |
| Challenge Cup | 9 December 2025 | 9 December 2025 | Second round | Second round | 1 | 0 | 1 | 0 | 2 | 2 | +0 | 0.00 |
| Total | | | | | 44 | 11 | 16 | 17 | 50 | 68 | −18 | 25.00 |

Source: Competitions

== Transfers ==
| Date | Name | Moving from | Moving to | Fee |
|---|---|---|---|---|
| 1 June 2025 | Jack Baird | Greenock Morton | St Johnstone | Free |
| 1 June 2025 | Morgan Boyes | Greenock Morton | St Johnstone | Free |
| 12 June 2025 | Logan O’Boy | Greenock Morton | Free agent | Free |
| 12 June 2025 | Lamar Reynolds | Greenock Morton | Free agent | Free |
| 21 June 2025 | Arron Lyall | Greenock Morton | Ross County | Free |
| 25 June 2025 | Jackson Longridge | Hamilton Academical | Greenock Morton | Free |
| 27 June 2025 | Ryan Mullen | Greenock Morton | St Mirren | Free |
| 4 July 2025 | Kris Moore | Leeds United | Greenock Morton | Free |
| 7 July 2025 | Sonny Hart | Swindon Town | Greenock Morton | Loan |
| 1 August 2025 | Eamonn Brophy | Ross County | Greenock Morton | Free |
| 2 August 2025 | Michael O'Halloran | Dunfermline Athletic | Greenock Morton | Free |
| 1 September 2025 | Aaron Comrie | Dunfermline Athletic | Greenock Morton | Free |
| 13 September 2025 | Cammy MacPherson | St Johnstone | Greenock Morton | Free |
| 26 September 2025 | Arron Lyall | Ross County | Greenock Morton | Loan |
| 12 June 2025 | Curtis Main | Ayr United | Greenock Morton | Loan |
| 12 June 2025 | Reuben Lopata-White | Leeds United | Greenock Morton | Loan |
| 12 June 2025 | Dylan Corr | Greenock Morton | Kelty Hearts | Free |
