= John Fulton (footballer) =

Scottish footballer

Personal information
- Full name: John Connell Fulton
- Date of birth: 1890
- Place of birth: Paisley, Scotland
- Date of death: 8 November 1926 (aged 35–36)
- Place of death: Paisley, Scotland
- Position: Left back

Senior career*
Years	Team	Apps	(Gls)
–	Paisley Amateurs		
–	Neilston Victoria		
1909–1910	Abercorn	5	(0)
1910–1913	Morton	89	(1)
1913	Everton	0	(0)
1913–1914	Rangers	14	(1)
1914–1920	Morton	9	(0)
1919	→ St Mirren (loan)	1	(0)
1920	Johnstone		
Total		118	(2)
- * Club domestic league appearances and goals

John Connell Fulton (1890 – 8 November 1926) was a Scottish footballer who played as a left back, mainly for Morton over two spells.

He started his career at Abercorn, then played regularly for Morton for three seasons, attracting the attention of Everton who agreed a deal to sign him for cash and Jimmy Gourlay in May 1913. However, Fulton never made a first-team appearance in the English Football League and by the end of the same year was back in Scotland with Rangers, who finished runners-up in the 1913–14 Scottish Division One table, and then immediately sold Fulton back to Morton.

World War I soon broke out, and during the conflict Fulton served in the Scots Guards, attaining the rank of sergeant-major. His military commitments meant he rarely played for Morton (who were one of Scotland's strongest teams during the period) but remained contracted to them. In 1919, with the war at an end, Fulton was permitted to play for Morton's local rivals St Mirren, primarily in the 1919 Victory Cup due to an injury to Bernard Callaghan, and he was part of the team which brought the trophy to Paisley – his home town – with a win over Heart of Midlothian at Celtic Park.

Fulton retired as a footballer in 1923, becoming a local professional player and greenkeeper at Bushes Golf Club in Paisley. He died in an accident in November 1926 when he fell off a wall at his workplace, and the shotgun he was carrying for pest control on the course discharged, shooting him in the head. His son, also John, played for Queen of the South and Dumbarton in the 1940s.
