= Andre Boe =

Cameroonian former footballer

Personal information
- Date of birth: 24 October 1962 (age 64)
- Place of birth: Cameroon
- Position: Goalkeeper

Senior career*
Years	Team	Apps	(Gls)
1996	Greenock Morton	3	(0)
- Molesey

International career
1985–1989	Cameroon		
- * Club domestic league appearances and goals

Andre Boe (born 24 October 1962) is a Cameroonian former footballer who is last known to have played as a goalkeeper for Molesey. He was known for his unorthodox style and attention-grabbing antics on the field where he "sometimes played more like an outfield player".

== Club career ==
In early 1996, Boe appeared in three league matches for Scottish second division side Greenock Morton as a short-term replacement for an injured David Wylie. He made his debut with the team on 24 February, keeping a clean sheet in a 2–0 win over Dumbarton where he memorably stood near the half-way line and waved to the crowd in the first half. After that, he played for Molesey in the English seventh division but left due to "cultural reasons".

== International career ==
He reportedly earned 62 caps for the Cameroon national team, although that number has been disputed.
