= Robert Stewart (Morton footballer) =

Scottish footballer

Personal information
- Position: Right back

Senior career*
Years	Team	Apps	(Gls)
–	Kilbarchan		
1902–1912	Morton	237	(9)
1912–1913	Johnstone	11	(0)

International career
1907	Scottish League XI	1	(0)
- * Club domestic league appearances and goals

Robert Stewart was a Scottish footballer who played as a right back. He made 260 appearances in the Scottish Cup and Scottish Football League (all in its top division) for Morton during his decade with the Greenock club between 1902 and 1912. Stewart was selected once for the Scottish Football League XI in March 1907; he contributed to a clean sheet for the defence in a 0–0 draw with the Football League XI.
