= George French (Scottish footballer) =

Scottish footballer

Personal information
- Place of birth: Scotland
- Position: Centre forward

Senior career*
Years	Team	Apps	(Gls)
1919–1927	Morton	182	(112)
1927	Arthurlie	0	(0)
Total		182	(112)

International career
1921–1922	Scottish League XI	3	(1)
- * Club domestic league appearances and goals

George French was a Scottish footballer who played as a centre forward, primarily for Morton. He is one of the club's all-time leading scorers, with 127 goals from 199 appearances in the Scottish Football League (all in its top division) and Scottish Cup. He played a major role in Morton's run to the 1922 Scottish Cup Final, but was unable to play in the match due to injury.

French was selected for the Scottish Football League XI on three occasions.
