= Jimmy Gourlay =

Scottish footballer (1888–1970)

Personal information
- Full name: James Gourlay
- Date of birth: 11 January 1888
- Place of birth: Tarbolton, Scotland
- Date of death: 12 September 1970 (aged 82)
- Place of death: Greenock, Scotland
- Positions: Inside right; right half

Senior career*
Years	Team	Apps	(Gls)
1908–1909	Port Glasgow Athletic	22	(6)
1909–1913	Everton	54	(8)
1913–1926	Morton	385	(113)
Total		461	(127)

International career
1914–1919	Scottish Football League XI	2	(1)
- * Club domestic league appearances and goals

James Gourlay (11 January 1888 – 12 September 1970) was a Scottish footballer.

He played for Port Glasgow Athletic, and for Everton in England between 1909 and 1913 before joining Morton as part of an exchange deal for John Fulton. He remained an important member of the Greenock club's strong team in the era spanning World War I when they finished in the top four of the Scottish Football League for six seasons running, and won the War Fund Shield in 1915.

Aged 34, Gourlay scored the only goal (with a free kick) in Morton's 1–0 win over Rangers in the 1922 Scottish Cup Final which is, to date, the club's only major trophy. He later had a short spell at Third Lanark.

Gourlay played in the Home Scots v Anglo-Scots annual trial match in 1914 and was selected for the Scottish Football League XI either side of the war, but never gained a full international cap. His father James Gourlay played once for Scotland in 1888; they are related to the lawn bowls champions David Gourlay Sr. and David Gourlay Jr.
