= Robert Stevenson (inside left) =

Scottish footballer

Personal information
- Position: Inside left

Senior career*
| Years | Team | Apps | (Gls) |
- Petershill
| 1913–1921 | Morton | 222 | (54) |
| 1921–1924 | St Mirren | 69 | (13) |
| 1924 | Clydebank | 7 | (0) |
| 1924–1925 | Arthurlie | 5 | (0) |
| Total | | 303 | (67) |
- * Club domestic league appearances and goals

Robert Stevenson was a Scottish footballer who played as a inside left for Morton, St Mirren, Clydebank and Arthurlie. He left Morton the year before the Greenock club won the Scottish Cup in 1922, but was a regular member of their team in the period around World War I when they finished in the top four of the Scottish Football League table for six seasons running (Stevenson missed one of these campaigns entirely, likely as a result of wartime commitments). He did take part in both of the Navy and Army War Fund Shield finals, the first of which in 1915 Morton won by defeating Rangers and the second in 1918 which they lost to Celtic. After he moved to Renfrewshire derby rivals St Mirren, Stevenson quickly struck up a fruitful partnership with fellow new signing Dunky Walker, who finished as the top scorer across European club football in their first season together.
