= 1927–28 Scottish Division Two =

Scottish Second Division
- Season: 1927–28
- Champions: Ayr United
- Promoted: Ayr United; Third Lanark

The 1927–28 Scottish Second Division was won by Ayr United who, along with second placed Third Lanark, were promoted to the First Division. Armadale finished bottom.

== Table ==
Pos	Team	Pld	W	D	L	GF	GA	GD	Pts	Promotion or relegation
1	Ayr United (P)	38	24	6	8	117	60	+57	54	Promotion to the 1928–29 First Division
2	Third Lanark (P)	38	18	9	11	101	66	+35	45	Promotion to the 1928–29 First Division
3	King's Park	38	16	12	10	84	68	+16	44	
4	East Fife	38	18	7	13	87	73	+14	43	
5	Forfar Athletic	38	18	7	13	83	73	+10	43	
6	Dundee United	38	17	9	12	81	73	+8	43	
7	Arthurlie	38	18	4	16	85	90	−5	40	
8	Albion Rovers	38	17	4	17	79	69	+10	38	
9	East Stirlingshire	38	14	10	14	84	76	+8	38	
10	Arbroath	38	16	4	18	84	86	−2	36	
11	Dumbarton	38	16	4	18	66	72	−6	36	
12	Queen of the South	38	15	6	17	92	106	−14	36	
13	Leith Athletic	38	13	9	16	76	71	+5	35	
14	Clydebank	38	16	3	19	78	80	−2	35	
15	Alloa Athletic	38	12	11	15	72	76	−4	35	
16	Stenhousemuir	38	15	5	18	75	82	−7	35	
17	St Bernard's	38	15	5	18	75	103	−28	35	
18	Morton	38	13	8	17	65	82	−17	34	
19	Bathgate	38	10	11	17	62	81	−19	31	
20	Armadale	38	8	8	22	53	112	−59	24	

(P) Promoted
