= Jock McIntyre =

Scottish footballer and manager

Personal information
- Place of birth: Greenock, Scotland
- Date of death: 1963 (age 72)
- Place of death: Greenock, Scotland
- Positions: Wing half; right back

Senior career*
Years	Team	Apps	(Gls)
- Petershill
1915–1924	Greenock Morton	294	(14)
1924–1929	Boston	167	(3)
1929–1931	Coleraine		
1931	Boston Bears	4	(2)

International career
1921	Scottish League XI	1	(0)

Managerial career
- 1929–1931: Coleraine
- * Club domestic league appearances and goals

John McIntyre was a Scottish footballer who played professionally in Scotland, Ireland and the United States.

McIntyre spent his early career with Morton, making over 300 appearances and winning the Scottish Cup with them in 1922. In 1924, he moved to the United States and signed with the Boston Soccer Club of the American Soccer League. While he played right fullback with Morton, McIntyre moved up to wing half with Boston. In his five seasons with Boston, he won the 1928 league title and the 1925 and 1927 League Cup. In July 1929, he moved to Ireland where he was a player-manager with Coleraine. He briefly returned to the United States, playing four games with the Boston Bears during the fall half of the 1931 season.
