= John McNeil (footballer, born 1959) =

Scottish footballer (born 1959)

Personal information
- Full name: John McNeil
- Date of birth: 12 February 1959 (age 67)
- Place of birth: Greenock, Scotland
- Position: Right winger

Senior career*
Years	Team	Apps	(Gls)
1975–1991	Morton	328	(67)
1982	→ Dundee United (loan)	1	(0)
1983	→ Arsenal(loan)	0	(0)
Total		329	(67)
- * Club domestic league appearances and goals

John McNeil (born 12 February 1959) is a Scottish former professional footballer who played as a right winger.

== Career ==
McNeil signed professional forms with Morton in 1975 and played over 400 games for the Greenock side. Apart from a one-game loan spell with Dundee United in 1982 and two weeks on loan at Arsenal at the end of 1982–83 (in which he played in 6 Football Combination reserve games, scoring 2 goals, between 28 April and 9 May), (Note: 28 April 1983 - QPR (H) 1-2; 30 April 1983 - Norwich (H) 0-0; 2 May 1983 - West Ham (H) 3-3 Scored two goals; 4 May 1983 - Oxford (A) 0-1; 7 May 1983 - Swansea (A) 0-0; 9 May 1983 - Oxford (H) 0-1.) McNeil spent his entire career with Morton over fifteen years, retiring in 1991.

In January 2008, McNeil was believed to be working for IBM.

== Personal life ==
John's son David McNeil made his debut for Morton in August 2013. After scoring on his debut, David went on to make 21 appearances scoring twice before leaving the club in 2015.

== Honours ==
Greenock Morton

- Scottish Football League First Division: 1977–78, 1983–84, 1986–87
