= Dave Edwards (Scottish footballer) =

Scottish footballer (1900–1946)

Personal information
- Full name: David Maxwell Edwards
- Date of birth: 13 June 1900
- Place of birth: Partick, Scotland
- Date of death: 17 June 1946 (aged 46)
- Place of death: Cowdenbeath, Scotland
- Position: Goalkeeper

Senior career*
Years	Team	Apps	(Gls)
–1919	Rutherglen Glencairn		
1919–1926	Morton	201	(0)
1926–1929	Bethlehem Steel	84	(0)
1929	New Bedford Whalers	9	(0)
1930	Holley Carburetor		
1931–1932	Morton	13	(0)
1932–1933	Cowdenbeath	48	(0)
1932–1933	Dundee	15	(0)
1933–1934	Arbroath	32	(0)
1934	Brechin City	0	(0)
Total		402	(0)
- * Club domestic league appearances and goals

Dave Maxwell Edwards (13 June 1900 – 17 June 1946) was a Scottish football goalkeeper who played professionally in both Scotland and the United States during the early 20th century.

== Playing career ==
Edwards began his career in Scotland. Having kept goal for Rutherglen Glencairn in 1919 when they won the Scottish Junior Cup, he moved up to the senior leagues with Morton, quickly displaced the long-serving Jock Bradford, and was well-established as the Greenock club when they won the Scottish Cup in 1922.

On 23 August 1926, Edwards signed with Bethlehem Steel of the American Soccer League. He played a total of 76 league games with Bethlehem from 1926 until the team was suspended by the ASL five games into the 1928–1929 season as part of the "Soccer Wars". At that time, Bethlehem moved to the Eastern Soccer League. Edwards' stats for that league are unknown, but at some point during the season, he left Bethlehem Steel and transferred to the New Bedford Whalers of the ASL. In 1929, he moved west to Holley Carburetor in the Detroit League.

In 1930 Edwards returned to Scotland, beginning the 1930–31 season with Morton. In February 1931, he transferred to Cowdenbeath. After spending a season minding the net for Cowden, he enjoyed two final seasons in the seniors with Dundee and Arbroath (and a short time with Brechin City where his contract was cancelled before he played a match).

== Post-football career ==
Following his retirement, he was a wicketkeeper/batsman with Cowdenbeath Cricket Club and ran the refreshment stall behind the stand at Central Park. In 1945, he was a member of the 6-man committee of the Cowdenbeath Football Trust which succeeded in reviving Cowdenbeath FC after the war. Dave was a constructional engineer and was employed at Burntisland Shipyard. During the War, he had been a Special Constable. He died at age 46 at his home in Primmer Place, Cowdenbeath in 1946.
