= Karim Boukraa =

French footballer (born 1973)

Personal information
- Date of birth: 7 March 1973 (age 53)
- Place of birth: Le havre , France
- Height: 1.82 m (6 ft 0 in)
- Position: Striker

Senior career*
Years	Team	Apps	(Gls)
–1995	Le Havre		
1995–1996	Brest		
1996–1997	Gazélec Ajaccio		
1997–1998	Angoulême		
1998–1999	Paris FC		
1999–2000	Fécamp		
2000	Greenock Morton	18	(1)
2000–2002	Ross County	30	(2)
2003–2004	Rodez		
- * Club domestic league appearances and goals

Karim Boukraa (born 7 March 1973) is a French former professional footballer who played as a striker.

== Career ==
On 3 August 2000, Boukraa flew to Scotland to discuss a deal with Greenock Morton. However, four months later, he decided to leave the club and joined Ross County, expressing dissatisfaction with Morton's directors.

On his debut with Ross County, Boukraa assisted in a 2–0 victory over Ayr United. However, he gained recognition for his performance during the 2000–01 Scottish Cup 4th Round match between Ross County and Scottish giants Rangers, despite Ross County losing 3–2.

Earlier, the winger had mentioned that he would not be intimidated by their best players, as he had previous experience in the French Cup with top clubs. Continuing his tenure for the 2001-02 season, Ross County advanced to the 2001–02 Scottish League Cup quarter-finals with 2–1 win over Dundee. However, despite these accomplishments, Boukraa and three others were subsequently released from the club.

Thinking back to his years in Scotland, Boukraa stated, "There, everything is done to put the footballer in the best possible environment".
