= Jock Bradford =

Scottish footballer (1887–1973)

Personal information
- Date of birth: 1887
- Place of birth: Rutherglen, Scotland
- Date of death: 1973 (aged 85–86)
- Place of death: Lennoxtown, Scotland
- Height: 5 ft 9 in (1.75 m)
- Position: Goalkeeper

Senior career*
Years	Team	Apps	(Gls)
- Kirkintilloch Harp
1910–1920	Morton	270	(0)
1920–1921	Bo'ness		
1921–1928	St Mirren	214	(0)
1927–1928	→ Raith Rovers (loan)		
1928–1929	Dumbarton	45	(0)
Total		529	(0)

International career
1912	Scottish League XI	1	(0)
- * Club domestic league appearances and goals

John Bradford (1887 – 1973) was a Scottish footballer who played as a goalkeeper, mainly for Morton and St Mirren.

== Career ==
The first part of Bradford's senior career was spent with Morton, where he was an important member of the Greenock club's strong team in the era spanning World War I when they finished in the top four of the Scottish Football League table for six consecutive seasons, and won the War Fund Shield in 1915. However, he was called up for military service with the Highland Light Infantry and lost his place to the younger Dave Edwards in 1919 and spent time with Bo'ness (then playing in the Central League) before he was picked up by Morton's local rivals, St Mirren as a possible replacement for Willie O'Hagan.

He went on to have an equally successful time with the Paisley club, culminating in them winning the Scottish Cup for the first time in their history in 1926, Bradford lifting the trophy as captain. He left St Mirren abruptly in early 1927 after a dispute over absences, switching to Raith Rovers, and then had a spell with Dumbarton.

Bradford played in the Home Scots v Anglo-Scots annual trial match in 1912 and was selected for the Scottish Football League XI later the same year, but never gained a full international cap. He was inducted into St Mirren's 'Hall of Fame' in 2011, and was nominated for the Morton equivalent in 2017 though not added on that occasion.

== See also ==
- List of footballers in Scotland by number of league appearances (500+)
