= George Anderson (mathematician) =

English mathematician

George Anderson (born ca. 1720) was an English mathematician, about whom nothing is known beyond what is contained in eight letters addressed by him to the celebrated mathematician William Jones (father of the orientalist Sir William Jones), which were printed from the Macclesfield papers in 1841. They give proof of singular ability in treating the most advanced mathematical problems of the time, and by many indications show the writer (contrary to an editorial surmise) to have occupied a respectable position in life. The first three are dated from Twickenham, August to October 1736; the two from 1739 were sent from Hothfield and Newbottle, (Note: There are two places called Newbottle: Newbottle, Northamptonshire and Newbottle, Tyne and Wear. The printed copy of the letter does not say which one this was.) respectively; the last was written 27 September 1740, at Leyden, where the writer, now aged 20 and enrolled as a law student since 12 September, had just entered upon a "train of studies and exercises" at the university. He expressed in 1739 a strong desire to be admitted to the Royal Society, but his name does not appear upon the list of its members.

== Letters ==
#	Page Range	Date	Contents
CIX	293–297	21 July 1736	Criticism of Halley's paper on logarithms.
CXII	301–305	28 August 1736	[Samuel] Cunn's series for periphery of ellipse, and other quadratures. Equation of payments.
CXIII	306–310	28 October 1736	Further quadratures.
CXIV	311–312	no date	Area of spherical triangle by fluxions.
CXVI	319–323	31 January 1737 (N.S. 1738)	Demonstration of a theorem of De Moivre. Solution of Simpson's problem.
CXXII	342–346	10 May 1739	Formulæ for approximate solution of equations.
CXXIII	346–353	17 September 1739	Private affairs. Problems in quadratures.
CXXVI	360–366	16 (N.S. 27) September 1740	Formulæ for logarithms. Quadrature of lunales. Leyden booksellers. Inquiry about the wedge.
