= 1928–29 Scottish Division Two =

Scottish Second Division
- Season: 1928–29
- Champions: Dundee United
- Promoted: Dundee United; Morton

The 1928–29 Scottish Second Division was won by Dundee United who, along with second placed Morton, were promoted to the First Division.

== Table ==
Pos	Team	Pld	W	D	L	GF	GA	GD	Pts	Promotion or relegation
1	Dundee United	36	24	3	9	99	55	+44	51	Promotion to the 1929–30 First Division
2	Morton	36	21	8	7	85	49	+36	50	Promotion to the 1929–30 First Division
3	Arbroath	36	19	9	8	90	60	+30	47	
4	Albion Rovers	36	18	8	10	95	67	+28	44	
5	Leith Athletic	36	18	7	11	78	56	+22	43	
6	St Bernard's	36	16	9	11	77	55	+22	41	
7	Forfar Athletic	35	14	10	11	69	75	−6	38	
8	East Fife	35	15	6	14	88	77	+11	36	
9	Queen of the South	36	16	4	16	86	79	+7	36	
10	Bo'ness	35	15	5	15	62	62	0	35	
11	Dunfermline Athletic	36	13	7	16	66	72	−6	33	
12	East Stirlingshire	36	14	4	18	71	75	−4	32	
13	Alloa Athletic	36	12	7	17	64	77	−13	31	
14	Dumbarton	36	11	9	16	59	78	−19	31	
15	King's Park	36	8	13	15	60	84	−24	29	
16	Clydebank	36	11	5	20	70	85	−15	27	
17	Arthurlie	32	9	7	16	51	73	−22	25	Resigned, fixtures stand
18	Stenhousemuir	35	9	6	20	51	90	−39	24	
19	Armadale	36	8	7	21	47	99	−52	23	
20	Bathgate	0	0	0	0	0	0	0	0	Resigned, fixtures expunged
