= George Nathanael Anderson =

American pastor and missionary (1883-1958)

Doctor George Nathanael Anderson BA
- Church: Augustana Evangelical Lutheran Church
- Other posts: President and director of the General Administrative Committee (1944-1952)

Orders
- Ordination: 1912

Personal details
- Born: August 8, 1883 Morganville, Kansas
- Died: October 8, 1958 (aged 75) Minneapolis, Minnesota
- Denomination: Lutheran
- Spouse: Annette Elmquist
- Children: Seven surviving
- Education: Bethany College & Augustana Theological Seminary

George Nathanael Anderson (August 8, 1883 – October 8, 1958) was an American Lutheran pastor and missionary to Tanganyika. Anderson studied at Bethany College in Lindsborg, Kansas, and the Augustana Theological Seminary before being ordained by the Augustana Evangelical Lutheran Church in 1912. He held a succession of posts in the American Mid West before volunteering for missionary service.

Anderson was sent to the British colony of Tanganyika in 1924 to review the situation there. As a former German colony the territory had hosted missions of the German Lutheran Church but these were expelled in 1917 during the First World War. Anderson reported favourably and a formal Augustana Church mission was sent in 1926, with Anderson at its head. Anderson oversaw the expansion of the church's role in the territory and in 1944 was appointed President and director of its General Administrative Committee, becoming responsible for the church's entire operation in Tanganyika. He retired in 1956 and died in the United States two years later.

== Early life ==
George Nathanael Anderson was born on August 8, 1883, in Morganville, Kansas. He graduated from Bethany College in Lindsborg, Kansas, in 1909. He later graduated from the Augustana Theological Seminary; studied at the University of Minnesota and the Union Theological Seminary and was awarded a doctorate. Anderson was ordained as a pastor in 1912 and found work preaching in the Midwestern United States with the Augustana Evangelical Lutheran Church. At one point he was at the First Lutheran Church in Saint Paul, Minnesota, where he ministered to a congregation of over 1,500 people. In 1919 he was amongst a group of people praying at a church meeting for a new bible school to train Lutheran missionaries. Amongst the attendees was Annette Elmquist, who had attended a non-Lutheran bible school and was keen for the church to have its own. Soon afterwards Elmquist and Anderson were married.

== Tanganyika ==
The Lutheran church had been active in missionary work in Tanganyika before the First World War, however the largely German missionaries were expelled by British forces in 1917. The Augustana Church was asked to take over the abandoned missions by the German Lutheran Church and in Summer 1924 Anderson with his wife and three sons (LeRoy. Paul and Marcus) visited the colony. Anderson reported good potential in the area and a formal mission was dispatched by the church in 1926, with Anderson being appointed a missionary by the church's Board of Foreign Missions. After some deliberation (he would have to leave behind his family, including daughter Dorothy who was then ill with tuberculosis) Anderson agreed and returned to Tanganyika on January 6, 1926, with fellow missionaries Herbert S Magney and Ludwig Melander. Anderson initially spent his time teaching new pastors at the mission's seminary in Marangu but reported to the church that there was a good appetite for the Lutheran faith in Iramba and it was decided to establish a mission there. Anderson was appointed head of the mission and led four American missionaries and one from Leipzig (who held Russian citizenship and so was permitted entry by the British authorities). Anderson's speciality was in evangelism and the study of the Iramba language, into which he translated the New Testament and various hymns, liturgies and catechisms .

Anderson's wife and children joined him at Iramba from 1927 and remained with him until his retirement in 1956, though Annette would sometimes reside in the United States with some of the children to ensure their education. One son, Marcus, died in Iramba of Malaria. They had seven surviving children of which four sons became pastors, including one who was a missionary in Tanganyika. One of Anderson's daughters married a missionary and served for her entire life at a mission in Iramba. Anderson occasionally returned to the United States on leave and during these periods worked to generate support for the African missions. During one such visit he helped to found the Lutheran Bible Institute.

From 1944 he was appointed president and director of the General Administrative Committee of the Augustana Lutheran Church (which until 1944 was known as the General Committee of Former German Missions). In this role, which he held until 1952, he was responsible for liaising with the Tanganyikan government. One key task was to negotiate with the colony's government over the ownership of land and property formerly held by the German Lutheran Church. During Anderson's time in Africa the Lutheran missions expanded to encompass a number of churches and dispensaries, a hospital at Kiomboi and leper centres at Mkalama and Iambi. He described the effect of listening to a congregation of 2,000 singing Luther's hymn "A Mighty Fortress Is Our God": "I never heard it sung with more spirit; the effect was almost overwhelming".

Anderson retired in 1956 and was invited to remain in Tanganyika by the local church but chose to return to the United States. He died on October 8, 1958, in Minneapolis.
