= George Anderson (footballer, born 1953) =

Scottish footballer

Personal information
- Date of birth: 25 December 1953 (age 72)
- Place of birth: Port Glasgow, Scotland
- Position: Central defender

Senior career*
Years	Team	Apps	(Gls)
- Port Glasgow
1969–1981	Morton	261	(19)
1981–1985	Airdrieonians	104	(2)
1985–1987	Morton	19	(1)
Total		384	(22)

International career
1973	Scotland U23	1	(0)
- * Club domestic league appearances and goals

George Anderson (born 25 December 1953) is a Scottish former footballer.

Anderson played as a defender for Morton from 1969 to 1981, and from 1985 to 1987. He is 10th on the club's post-WWII list of appearances with 342 in all competitions. He was selected by then Scotland manager Tommy Docherty for a South American tour with the senior Scottish squad prior to the 1974 World Cup. On 1 December 2017, Anderson was inducted to the Greenock Morton Hall of Fame.
