= John Russell (Dumbarton footballer) =

Scottish footballer

Personal information
- Position: Winger

Senior career*
Years	Team	Apps	(Gls)
1922–1924	Airdrie	3	(0)
1924–1928	Dumbarton	97	(26)
- * Club domestic league appearances and goals

John Russell was a Scottish footballer who played in the 1920s. Following an unsuccessful spell with Airdrie he signed for Dumbarton in the summer of 1924 and went on to be a regular in the team for the next four seasons.
