= William Molloy (footballer) =

English footballer

Personal information
- Full name: William Henry B. Molloy
- Date of birth: 1904
- Place of birth: Barrow-in-Furness, England
- Position: Inside forward

Youth career
- Dumbarton Harp

Senior career*
Years	Team	Apps	(Gls)
1925–1928	Celtic		
1928–1931	Dumbarton	89	(33)
1931–1932	Yeovil & Petters United		
1932–1933	Swansea Town		
1933–1934	Bristol City		
1933–1934	Falkirk		
1935–1936	Dumbarton	2	(0)
- * Club domestic league appearances and goals

William Molloy (born 1904) was an English footballer who played for Celtic, Dumbarton, Yeovil & Petters United, Swansea Town, Bristol City, and Falkirk.
