= Cammy Ballantyne =

Scottish footballer

Personal information
- Full name: Cameron Ballantyne
- Date of birth: 13 April 1997 (age 29)
- Place of birth: Glasgow, Scotland
- Height: 5 ft 7 in (1.70 m)
- Position: Defender

Team information
- Current team: Greenock Morton
- Number: 2

Youth career
- 2007–2016: Dundee United

Senior career*
| Years | Team | Apps | (Gls) |
| 2016–2018 | Dundee United | 3 | (0) |
| 2016–2017 | → Montrose (loan) | 30 | (1) |
| 2017 | → Montrose (loan) | 27 | (1) |
| 2018 | → Montrose (loan) | 8 | (1) |
| 2018–2019 | Dumbarton | 30 | (0) |
| 2019–2022 | Montrose | 68 | (6) |
| 2022–2024 | Airdrieonians | 62 | (3) |
| 2024– | Greenock Morton | 53 | (2) |

International career
- Scotland U17
Medal record
Scotland
UEFA European U-17 Championship
| Bronze medal – third place | 2014 Malta | Team competition |
- * Club domestic league appearances and goals as of 4 May 2026

Cameron Ballantyne (born 13 April 1997) is a Scottish footballer who plays as a defender for Scottish Championship club Greenock Morton. Ballantyne previously played for Dundee United and Dumbarton, and had three loan spells with Montrose. Most recently, Ballantyne played for Airdrieonians

== Early life ==
Cammy Ballantyne was born in Glasgow on 13 April 1997. He attended Duncanrig Secondary School in East Kilbride. After joining Dundee United as a youth player in 2007, he signed for the club as a professional in 2013.

== Playing career ==
=== Club ===
Ballantyne made his first team debut against Partick Thistle in a Scottish Premiership match on 10 May 2016. He joined League Two team Montrose on loan in August 2016, with the loan being extended in January 2017 for the rest of the 2016–17 season. In March 2017, Ballantyne extended his Dundee United contract to 2018. He rejoined Montrose on a season-long loan in August 2017. His spell with Montrose was, however, cut short, and he was recalled at the start of January 2018. He then rejoined Montrose on an emergency loan for the remainder of the season in March 2018. Following the end of his contract, he was released by United in May 2018 and joined Scottish League One side Dumbarton in June 2018. After making 32 appearances for Dumbarton, he joined Montrose on a two year permanent deal in May 2019. In May 2022 Ballantyne signed for Airdrieonians, where he ended up getting him and the club promoted to the Scottish Championship, beating Hamilton Accies on penalties, with Ballantyne himself scoring Airdries' sixth.

On 14 June 2024, Ballantyne joined Scottish Championship club Greenock Morton on a two-year deal.

=== International ===
Ballantyne was given his first call up for the Scotland under-17 squad in March 2014. He was added to the Scotland under-21 squad in March 2017, after Zak Jules withdrew.

== Career statistics ==
As of match played 25 October 2025

Appearances and goals by club, season and competition
| Club | Season | League | | | Scottish Cup | | League Cup | | Other | | Total | |
| Club | Season | Division | Apps | Goals | Apps | Goals | Apps | Goals | Apps | Goals | Apps | Goals |
|---|---|---|---|---|---|---|---|---|---|---|---|---|
| Dundee United | 2015–16 | Scottish Premiership | 2 | 0 | 0 | 0 | 0 | 0 | — | | 2 | 0 |
| Dundee United | 2016–17 | Scottish Championship | 0 | 0 | 0 | 0 | 0 | 0 | 0 | 0 | 0 | 0 |
| Dundee United | 2017–18 | Scottish Championship | 1 | 0 | 0 | 0 | 1 | 0 | 0 | 0 | 2 | 0 |
| Dundee United | Total | | 3 | 0 | 0 | 0 | 1 | 0 | 0 | 0 | 4 | 0 |
| Montrose (loan) | 2016–17 | Scottish League Two | 30 | 1 | 1 | 0 | 0 | 0 | 2 (Note: Appearance(s) in Scottish League One play-offs) | 0 | 33 | 1 |
| Montrose (loan) | 2017–18 | Scottish League Two | 17 | 0 | 3 | 0 | 0 | 0 | 3 (Note: Appearance(s) in Scottish Challenge Cup) | 2 | 23 | 2 |
| Montrose (loan) | 2017–18 | Scottish League Two | 8 | 1 | — | | — | | — | | 8 | 1 |
| Dumbarton | 2018–19 | Scottish League One | 30 | 0 | 1 | 0 | 0 | 0 | 1 | 0 | 32 | 0 |
| Montrose | 2019–20 | Scottish League One | 26 | 1 | 1 | 0 | 3 | 0 | 2 | 0 | 32 | 1 |
| Montrose | 2020–21 | Scottish League One | 18 | 2 | 3 | 0 | 3 | 1 | 2 (Note: Appearance(s) in Scottish Championship play-offs) | 0 | 26 | 3 |
| Montrose | 2021–22 | Scottish League One | 29 | 2 | 2 | 0 | 2 | 0 | 2 | 0 | 35 | 2 |
| Montrose | Total | | 73 | 5 | 6 | 0 | 8 | 1 | 6 | 0 | 93 | 6 |
| Airdrieonians | 2022–23 | Scottish League One | 29 | 0 | 1 | 0 | 3 | 1 | 5 (Note: One appearance in Scottish Challenge Cup; Four appearances in Scottish Championship play-offs) | 0 | 38 | 1 |
| Airdrieonians | 2023–24 | Scottish Championship | 20 | 1 | 1 | 0 | 5 | 1 | 6 (Note: Four appearances in Scottish Challenge Cup; Two appearances in Scottish Premiership play-offs) | 0 | 32 | 2 |
| Airdrieonians | Total | | 49 | 1 | 2 | 0 | 8 | 2 | 11 | 0 | 70 | 3 |
| Greenock Morton | 2024–25 | Scottish Championship | 28 | 1 | 1 | 0 | 4 | 1 | 2 | 0 | 35 | 2 |
| Greenock Morton | 2025–26 | Scottish Championship | 8 | 1 | 0 | 0 | 3 | 0 | 0 | 0 | 11 | 1 |
| Greenock Morton | Total | | 36 | 2 | 1 | 0 | 7 | 1 | 2 | 0 | 46 | 3 |
| Career total | | | 246 | 10 | 14 | 0 | 24 | 4 | 25 | 2 | 309 | 16 |
