= George Anderson (accountant-general) =

English accountant-general

George Anderson (November 1760- 30 April 1796) was the English accountant-general to the Board of Control.

== Biography ==
He was born at Weston, Buckinghamshire, in November 1760. His parents were in no way distinguished from the peasant class to which they belonged, and he himself worked as a day labourer until near the close of his seventeenth year. He had, however, been early smitten with a passion for mathematical studies, and in 1777 he sent to the ‘London Magazine’ solutions of some problems which had appeared in its pages. His letter attracted the notice of a gentleman of scientific acquirements from the neighbourhood of Weston, named Bonnycastle, who sought out the writer, and found him threshing in a barn, the walls of which were covered with triangles and parallelograms. The incident caused some local sensation, and it was felt that such uncommon talents should not remain without cultivation. Mr. King, vicar of Whitchurch, accordingly took charge of his education, and, after some preliminary instruction at a grammar school, sent him to Wadham College, Oxford, where he took the degree of M.A. in 1784. His patron destined him for the clerical profession; but after he had taken deacon's orders, he found that his tastes were otherwise directed, and came to London in search of employment in January 1783.

Through the influence of Scrope Bernard, M.P., brother-in-law to Mr. King, he shortly obtained a situation under the Board of Control, in which his arithmetical powers were so conspicuous as to secure his advancement to the point of accountant-general. While laboriously engaged in preparing the Indian budget for 1796, he was attacked with illness, and died in a few days, the victim of his assiduity, 30 April 1796. His death was deplored as a public loss by Mr. Dundas, then at the head of the Board of Control, and no Indian budget could, in fact, be produced that year.

He married in 1790, but left no children. A pension was obtained for his widow by Mr. Dundas. In character he was amiable and unpretending. He published in 1784 a translation from the Greek of the ‘Arenarius’ of Archimedes, with preface, notes, and illustrations of considerable merit; to which he added a version of the Latin Dissertation of Clavius. His only other work was a lucid and accurate statement as to the condition of Indian trade and finance, entitled ‘A General View of the Variations which have been made in the Affairs of the East India Company from the Conclusion of the War in India in 1784 to the Commencement of the present Hostilities,’ 1792.
