= 1983–84 Scottish First Division =

Scottish First Division
- Season: 1983–84
- Champions: Greenock Morton
- Promoted: Greenock Morton; Dumbarton
- Relegated: Raith Rovers; Alloa Athletic
- Matches played: 273
- Goals scored: 769 (2.82 per match)
- Top goalscorer: James Fry, John McNeil (17)
- Biggest home win: Raith Rovers 6–0 Brechin City, 05.05.1984
- Biggest away win: Clydebank 2–7 Alloa Athletic, 17.09.1983

The 1983–84 Scottish First Division season was won by Morton, who were promoted along with Dumbarton to the Premier Division. Raith Rovers and Alloa Athletic were relegated to the Second Division.

== League table ==
Pos	Team	Pld	W	D	L	GF	GA	GD	Pts	Promotion or relegation
1	Morton (C, P)	39	21	12	6	75	46	+29	54	Promotion to the Premier Division
2	Dumbarton (P)	39	20	11	8	66	44	+22	51	Promotion to the Premier Division
3	Partick Thistle	39	19	8	12	67	50	+17	46	
4	Clydebank	39	16	13	10	62	50	+12	45	
5	Brechin City	39	14	14	11	56	58	−2	42	
6	Kilmarnock	39	16	6	17	57	53	+4	38	
7	Falkirk	39	16	6	17	46	54	−8	38	
8	Clyde	39	12	13	14	53	50	+3	37	
9	Hamilton Academical	39	11	14	14	43	46	−3	36	
10	Airdrieonians	39	13	10	16	45	53	−8	36	
11	Meadowbank Thistle	39	12	10	17	49	69	−20	34	
12	Ayr United	39	10	12	17	56	70	−14	32	
13	Raith Rovers (R)	39	10	11	18	53	62	−9	31	Relegation to the Second Division
14	Alloa Athletic (R)	39	8	10	21	41	64	−23	26	Relegation to the Second Division

Source: RSSSF and statto
Rules for classification: 1) points; 2) goal difference; 3) number of goals scored.
(C) Champions; (P) Promoted; (R) Relegated
