= George Edwin Anderson =

American businessman and politician

George Edwin Anderson (June 30, 1891 – March 6, 1961) was an American businessman and politician.

Anderson was born in Minneapolis, Minnesota. He lived in Onamia, Mille Lacs County, Minnesota with his wife. He owned a summer resort business. Anderson served on the South Harbor Township Board and on the Mille Lac School Board. Edwin served in the Minnesota House of Representatives from 1939 to 1942.
