= 1922 Scottish Cup final =

1922 Scottish Cup Final
- Event: 1921–22 Scottish Cup
Morton	Rangers
1	0
- Date: 15 April 1922
- Venue: Hampden Park, Glasgow
- Referee: T Dougray
- Attendance: 75,000

The 1922 Scottish Cup Final was played on 15 April 1922 at Hampden Park in Glasgow and was the final of the 44th staging of the Scottish Cup. Morton (as the Greenock club was named at the time) and Rangers contested the match, Morton won the match 1–0 with Jimmy Gourlay scoring the only goal of the game in the 12th minute.

The match was hard fought, with Morton defending aggressively. Rangers captain Andy Cunningham went off on 30 minutes with a fractured jaw and Rangers played the remainder of the game with ten men. Rangers had the bulk of play and missed a number of chances to score.

The victory was Morton's sole Scottish Cup win. For the 2021–22 season, the club issued a 100th anniversary commemorative 'throwback' home kit with a similar design and no sponsor.

== Match details ==
15 April 1922

Morton	1–0	Rangers
Gourlay 12'

Hampden Park, Glasgow
Attendance: 75,000

=== Teams ===
MORTON:
GK	(Scotland) Dave Edwards
FB	(Scotland) Jock McIntyre
FB	(Scotland) Robert Brown
RH	(Scotland) Jimmy Gourlay 12'
CH	(Scotland) Jackie Wright
LH	(Scotland) Bob McGregor
OR	(Scotland) Jock Buchanan
IR	(Scotland) Alex McNab
CF	(Scotland) Bobby McKay
IL	(Scotland) Alfred Brown
OL	(Scotland) James McMinn
Manager:
(Scotland) Bob Cochrane

RANGERS:
GK	(Scotland) William Robb
FB	(Northern Ireland) Bert Manderson
FB	(Northern Ireland) Billy McCandless
RH	(Scotland) David Meiklejohn
CH	(England) Arthur Dixon
LH	(Scotland) Tommy Muirhead
OR	(Scotland) Sandy Archibald
IR	(Scotland) Andy Cunningham (substituted off) 30'
CF	(Scotland) Geordie Henderson
IL	(Scotland) Tommy Cairns
OL	(Scotland) Alan Morton
Manager:
(Scotland) Bill Struth

== See also ==
Played between the same teams:

- 1948 Scottish Cup Final
- 1963 Scottish League Cup Final
