= John Muir (footballer, born 1903) =

Scottish footballer

Personal information
- Full name: John Baker Muir
- Date of birth: 18 November 1903
- Place of birth: Hamilton, Scotland
- Position: Centre half

Senior career*
Years	Team	Apps	(Gls)
1926–1927	Queen of the South		
1927–1928	Dumbarton	4	(0)
1928–1930	Falkirk		
1930–1931	Bristol Rovers		
1932–1935	Arbroath		
- * Club domestic league appearances and goals

John Baker Muir (born 18 November 1903) was a Scottish footballer who played for several clubs, including Queen of the South, Dumbarton, Falkirk, Bristol Rovers and Arbroath.
