= Donald MacPhail (footballer) =

Scottish footballer

Personal information
- Full name: Donald Douglas MacPhail
- Date of birth: 17 February 1911
- Place of birth: Dumbarton, Scotland
- Date of death: 1992 (aged 80–81)
- Position: Winger

Youth career
- Dumbarton Academy

Senior career*
Years	Team	Apps	(Gls)
1927–1928	Dumbarton	12	(1)
1928	→ South Bank (loan)		
1928–1932	Middlesbrough	4	(1)
1932–1933	Bournemouth & Boscombe Athletic	14	(0)
1933	Barnsley	0	(0)
1933–	Carlisle United	5	(0)
- Burton Town
- Nuneaton Town
1935–1937	Swindon Town	19	(4)
1937–1938	Dunfermline Athletic		
- Dartford
- Burton Town
- * Club domestic league appearances and goals

Donald Douglas MacPhail (17 February 1911 - 1992) was a Scottish footballer who played for Dumbarton and Dunfermline Athletic in Scotland, for Middlesbrough, Bournemouth & Boscombe Athletic, Carlisle United and Swindon Town in the English Football League, and for South Bank, Burton Town, Nuneaton Town and Dartford in English non-league football.
