= George Wayne Anderson (politician) =

American politician (1863–1922)

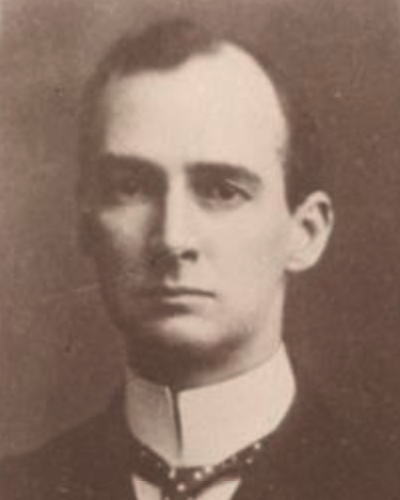
- Anderson (c. 1902)

Member of the Virginia Senate from the 38th district
- In office January 13, 1904 – January 10, 1906
- Preceded by: D. Gardiner Tyler
- Succeeded by: Charles J. Anderson

Member of the Virginia Senate from the 35th district
- In office December 4, 1901 – January 13, 1904
- Preceded by: Beverley B. Munford
- Succeeded by: Julian Bryant

Member of the Virginia House of Delegates from the Richmond City district
- In office December 6, 1899 – December 4, 1901

Personal details
- Born: July 10, 1863 Albemarle County, Virginia, Confederate States of America
- Died: December 30, 1922 (aged 59)
- Resting place: Hollywood Cemetery; Richmond, Virginia, U.S.
- Party: Democratic
- Spouse: Estelle Marguerite Burthe (m. 1899)
- Children: 4
- Relatives: Thomas Jefferson (great-grandfather)
- Education: University of Virginia; University of Virginia School of Law (LLB)
- Occupation: Politician; lawyer

George Wayne Anderson Sr. (July 10, 1863 – December 30, 1922) was a lawyer in Richmond, Virginia, who served as a state legislator. In 1899 he was elected to the Virginia House of Delegates and in 1901 to the Virginia Senate. He served as city attorney for Richmond.

== Early life ==
George Wayne Anderson was born on July 10, 1863, at Edgehill in Albemarle County, Virginia, to Jane Margaret (née Randolph) and Edward Clifford Anderson. His father was a banker and died when Anderson was young. From his mother's side, he was the great-grandson of Thomas Jefferson. He grew up in Savannah, Georgia. Anderson attended Hanover Academy and graduated from the University of Virginia. He received a debater's medal at both schools. He then graduated in 1888 from the University of Virginia School of Law with a Bachelor of Laws. He was a member of the Alpha Tau Omega fraternity.

== Career ==
After graduating, Anderson moved to Richmond and started practicing law.

Anderson was a Democrat. Anderson was elected as a member of the Virginia House of Delegates in 1899. He served in that role for two years. He was elected as a member of the Virginia Senate in 1901. He served in that role for four years. In 1904, Anderson ran for mayor of Richmond, but withdrew before the election. He lost the primary election for commonwealth's attorney of Richmond in 1905. He served as assistant city attorney from 1907 to 1921 and city attorney from 1921 to 1922.

Anderson joined the Virginia militia on September 25, 1890, as a second lieutenant. In 1903, Anderson commanded 1,300 men who were ordered by Governor Andrew Jackson Montague to Richmond during a strike of streetcar operators. In February 1904, Anderson transported an accused rapist from Richmond to Roanoke under orders of the governor. He retired on November 20, 1906.

== Personal life ==
He married Estelle Marguerite Burthe, a descendant of Dominique Burthe, on December 21, 1899. They had four children. He had a son, George Wayne Anderson Jr., who died in France in 1918. Anderson was a Presbyterian.

Anderson lived at 123 North Lombardy Street in Richmond. Anderson died of cancer on December 30, 1922. He was buried at Hollywood Cemetery.
