= James Miller (footballer, born 1904) =

Scottish footballer

Personal information
- Full name: James Miller
- Date of birth: 29 January 1904
- Place of birth: Glasgow, Scotland
- Positions: Centre forward; left half

Senior career*
Years	Team	Apps	(Gls)
- Maryhill
- Alloa Athletic
1920–1926	Raith Rovers	26	(8)
1920	→ Armadale (loan)		
1926–1927	East Fife	5	(0)
1927–1931	Dumbarton	107	(4)
1931–1934	Swansea Town		
1934–1935	Millwall		
1935–1939	Hibernian	103	(2)
1939–1942	Albion Rovers	0	(0)
- * Club domestic league appearances and goals

James Miller (born 29 January 1904) was a Scottish footballer who played for several clubs, including Raith Rovers, East Fife, Dumbarton, Swansea Town, Millwall, Hibernian and Albion Rovers, in a career almost exactly spanning the 20 years between World War I and World War II. Initially his position was centre forward but he later moved to a more defensive role, often playing at left half.
