= David Wylie (footballer) =

Scottish footballer

Personal information
- Full name: David Wylie
- Date of birth: 4 April 1966 (age 60)
- Place of birth: Johnstone, Scotland
- Height: 6 ft 0 in (1.83 m)
- Position: Goalkeeper

Team information
- Current team: Greenock Morton (goalkeeping coach)

Youth career
- Ferguslie United

Senior career*
Years	Team	Apps	(Gls)
1985–1998	Greenock Morton	482	(0)
1998–2000	Clyde	61	(0)
2000–2001	Clydebank	28	(0)
2001–2002	Renfrew	0	(0)
2002–2003	Gretna	2	(0)
2009–2010	Greenock Morton	0	(0)
Total		573	(0)
- * Club domestic league appearances and goals

David Wylie (born 4 April 1966, in Johnstone) is a Scottish former football goalkeeper.

After retiring as a player, Wylie remained registered as the fourth-choice goalkeeper for Greenock Morton, where he was the goalkeeping coach, for a number of years due to a constant stream of injuries to goalkeepers at the club.

== Career ==
Wylie spent 13 years at Greenock Morton, making over 500 appearances and winning two league titles (First and Second Division). During the 1986–87 season, Wylie was involved in the Scotland u21 squad, but did not make any appearances for them. He then had spells at Clyde (where he won another Second Division championship medal), Clydebank and Gretna.

His only spell out of senior football saw him spend the 2001–02 season at Renfrewshire junior side, Renfrew.

He returned to Morton as a goalkeeping coach, a role which he also performed at St Mirren whilst he was playing for Renfrew. He featured on the bench as a trialist against Ayr United in 2009 due to injuries to Kevin Cuthbert, Colin Stewart and Bryn Halliwell. Due to rules on trialists in the Scottish League Cup, Wylie had to be re-registered as a player for the second round defeat to Kilmarnock.

Wylie also has further coaching experience from when he was appointed as the goalkeeping coach at St Mirren in 2000.

== Honours ==
=== Greenock Morton ===
- Scottish Football League First Division: 1986–87
- Scottish Football League Second Division: 1994–95

=== Clyde ===
- Scottish Second Division: 1999–00

== See also ==
- List of footballers in Scotland by number of league appearances (500+)
