= Daniel Muir (footballer) =

Scottish football player

Personal information
- Full name: Daniel L Muir
- Position: Right back

Senior career*
Years	Team	Apps	(Gls)
1922–1925	Armadale		
1924–1927	St Bernard's		
1927–1931	Dumbarton	127	(1)
- * Club domestic league appearances and goals

Daniel F 'Danny' Muir was a Scottish football player, who played for Armadale, St Bernard's and Dumbarton during the 1920s and 1930s.
