= Greenock Morton F.C. =

Association football club in Greenock, Scotland

Greenock Morton
- Full name: Greenock Morton Football Club
- Nickname: The Ton
- Founded: 1874; 152 years ago (as Morton F.C.)
- Ground: Cappielow Park
- Capacity: 11,589 (5,741 seated)
- Owner: Morton Club Together (MCT)
- Manager: Vacant
- League: Scottish Championship
- 2025–26: Scottish Championship, 8th of 10
- Website: www.gmfc.net
Home colours	Away colours	Third colours

Greenock Morton Football Club is a Scottish professional football club, which plays in the Scottish Championship. The club was founded as Morton Football Club in 1874, making it one of the oldest Scottish clubs. Morton was renamed Greenock Morton in 1994 to celebrate the links with its home town of Greenock.

Morton won the Scottish Cup in 1922, and achieved its highest league finish in 1916–17, as runners-up to champions Celtic. Morton holds the record for the most promotions to and relegations from the top flight (10 promotions and 10 relegations), but has not competed in the top flight of the Scottish football league system since 1988. In 2014–15, Morton won its tenth league title in all divisions by winning the Scottish League One championship on the final day.

== History ==
=== 19th century ===
Morton Football Club was established in 1874. In the early 1870s the popularity of football was growing, with many clubs being established around Scotland. At the club's inaugural meeting, the first recorded words were "that this club be called Morton Football Club". The true reason for the name 'Morton' remains unclear, though the general consensus is that the club was named after the 'Morton Terrace', a row of houses next to the original playing field, where some of the players lived.

Morton was one of the founding members of the old Second Division, formed in 1893, and finished 8th in its first season. Morton first gained promotion to the old First Division in 1899–1900, and finished 4th in its first season there.

=== 20th century ===
Morton's greatest success came in its 1–0 defeat of Rangers in the 1922 Scottish Cup Final. Jimmy Gourlay scored the winning goal directly from a free kick in the 11th minute. Right after the match Morton boarded a train to play Hartlepool United in a pre-arranged friendly match. The celebrations were delayed until the following Wednesday when 10,000 fans turned out at Cappielow to celebrate.

Morton has made two other major cup final appearances. On Saturday 17 April 1948, Morton drew 1–1 with Rangers in the Scottish Cup Final. Morton's goal was a free kick scored by Jimmy White. The match was replayed on Wednesday 21 April. This time Rangers won 1–0 after extra time. The goal was said to be highly controversial because it was claimed that Morton goalkeeper Jimmy Cowan was blinded by the flash of a camera. These matches attracted huge crowds: the first match was played in front of 132,629, and the replay, in front of 133,750, was at the time a British record attendance for a midweek match.

Morton's third and most recent major cup final was in the League Cup, on Saturday, 26 October 1963. As in its previous two final appearances, Morton's opponent was again Rangers. The Glasgow side won by five goals to nil(HT: 0–0) in front of 106,000 supporters.

During the Second World War 'guest' players were common at clubs throughout Great Britain. Morton was particularly fortunate in this respect in that two of English football's greatest ever players turned out at Cappielow. Sir Stanley Matthews and Tommy Lawton made several guest appearances for Morton. When Morton reached the 1948 Scottish Cup Final both players sent telegrams wishing good luck to their former club. Matthews simply said 'I am delighted to see Morton reach the final of the Scottish Cup'. Lawton's was more expressive, he said 'Memories of happy days during the war at Cappielow compel me to wish the Morton manager & the boys all the best of luck in their cup final at Hampden'.

Morton has played in a European Club Competition once. After finishing 6th in Scotland's top division in 1967–68 Morton qualified for the European Inter-Cities Fairs Cup (now the UEFA Europa League). Drawn to play Chelsea, the club was eliminated at the first hurdle after a 5–0 defeat at Stamford Bridge and a 4–3 defeat at Cappielow.

In 1992–93 Morton lost 3–2 to Hamilton Academical in the Scottish Challenge Cup Final in front of 7,391 fans. The final was played at Love Street, the home of Morton's arch rivals St Mirren.

The club's name was changed in 1994 to Greenock Morton Football Club, to celebrate the club's links with its hometown, though it is still almost universally referred to as Morton.

=== 21st century ===
After experiencing financial problems the team was relegated from the First Division at the end of the 2000–01 season after a six-year stay and was put into administration. The club's financial problems continued and a second successive relegation followed. In season 2002–03, Morton's first ever season in the Third Division, the club's financial situation was resolved by the takeover by chairman Douglas Rae. Rae appointed John McCormack as manager, and the team won the Third Division championship at the first attempt, confirming its position with a 1–0 victory over Peterhead in front of a then Third Division record crowd of 8,497 people.

After a strong start to the 2003–04 season, the team fell away after the turn of the year, and finished in 4th place, well outside the promotion places. This came after being 12 points ahead in the Championship race at the half-way stage. This led to unfounded allegations that some players had placed large bets on nearest rivals Airdrie United to win the league, which Airdrie eventually did.

Jim McInally was announced as McCormack's successor, and in his first season as manager the club failed to gain promotion to the First Division by a single point, finishing behind Stranraer in 3rd place.

Morton failed to gain promotion to the First Division during the 2005–06 season. Finishing 2nd was not enough, as the SFL playoffs meant that only the championship-winning team would be promoted automatically. Gretna won the division, so Morton entered play-offs along with Peterhead (3rd), Partick Thistle (4th), and Stranraer (9th in Division One). Morton's first play-off match was against Peterhead, and the Greenock side was defeated 1–0 over two legs, the only goal a penalty in the second match at Balmoor.

The following season, a week after a 9–1 defeat of Forfar Athletic at Cappielow Park, Morton achieved promotion to the First Division, and went on to become Second Division Champions.

Jim McInally resigned on 11 February 2008 after a run of poor results allowed Morton to slip into 9th place in the First Division and was replaced by Davie Irons, with Derek Collins joining him as Assistant Manager. Morton battled relegation for most of the season and survived on the final day with a 3–0 victory against Partick Thistle, to avoid the relegation playoff by a single goal. Irons was sacked in September 2009 and replaced October by James Grady until the end of the season. Grady was removed from the club in May 2010, and replaced by Allan Moore. Allan Moore was sacked after a 5–1 defeat at home to Livingston on 23 November 2013. His replacement Kenny Shiels was given a contract until the end of season 2014–2015, but failed to reverse the slide towards relegation from the Scottish Championship, which became a reality on 12 April 2014 after a 2–0 away defeat by Alloa Athletic. Shiels resigned after a 10–2 defeat by Hamilton Accies.

After the resignation of Shiels, Jim Duffy was appointed as manager. He won the Scottish League One to return the club the Championship at the first time of asking. This league victory earned Morton's tenth league title, making it the joint third most crowned league champions in Scotland along with Hibernian, but behind Rangers and Celtic. Duffy was sacked in April 2018 after the club finished in 7th place in the Championship after a promising start. At the end of the 2017–18 season, Chairman Douglas Rae retired after 17 years and handed the role to his son Crawford, before dying less than two months later.

Jim Duffy was replaced by Ray McKinnon in May 2018 on a one-year contract; however McKinnon left to join league rivals Falkirk after just three months, being replaced by ex-reserve team manager Jonatan Johansson on a two-year deal.

== Colours ==
The team's home strip is traditionally a blue and white hooped shirt with white shorts and white socks, though season 2006–07 saw the team playing a blue and white striped shirt with white shorts and blue socks. Short-lived yet distinctive designs have been used over the years, including sky blue and white stripes and even a blue Morton tartan.

The away strip tends to vary much more: for the 2003–04 season it was an all yellow outfit, changing in 2004–05 to all white, which in turn became the 3rd team strip in 2005–06, with the special re-issue of the blue Morton tartan strip.

For the 2021–22 season, the club issued a commemorative 'throwback' home kit with a similar design to that worn in their 1922 Scottish Cup Final victory, with no sponsor.

== Stadium ==
Morton's stadium is Cappielow Park in Greenock, a ground the club has occupied since 1879. The current capacity is 11,589, with 5,741 of these being seated. In December 2008, Morton purchased the Reid Kerr sponsored east stand from local rivals St Mirren for £50,000, to improve the away end at Cappielow.

The area currently behind the western goal (upon which the new stand will be built) is known as the Wee Dublin End, which contains non-backed bench seating, converted from the old terracing that once stood there. The main stand contains plastic bucket seating to replace the old wooden benches that were a fixture of the ground until the late 1990s. The "Cowshed" lies to the north of the pitch; formerly a fully terraced arena for both home and away supporters (complete with segregation fence down the middle), it is now for home supporters only, with much of the frontal terracing removed, and plastic bucket seats occupying its place. The segregation fence no longer exists, and the whole area is used by home supporters. Behind the eastern goal is the "Sinclair Street" end, with uncovered terracing.

== Supporters and rivalries ==
Greenock Morton has several supporters' clubs based in Greenock and the surrounding towns. The main clubs are The Andy Ritchie Travel Club, The Prince of Wales Travel Club, The Greenock Morton Supporters Club, The Gourock Morton Supporters (Formerly The Albert Hotel Morton Supporters Club) and The Spinnaker Hotel Supporters Club.

The club has a fierce rivalry with neighbours St Mirren, with whom they contest the Renfrewshire derby. It is a rivalry which sees a large amount of animosity between the two sets of fans.

The club also contests a smaller rivalry with Partick Thistle. The fixture is classed as a category A match by Police Scotland, due to fan trouble from both sets of supporters.

The club shares friendships with Reggiana and PEC Zwolle.

== League participation ==
- First Tier: 1900–1927, 1929–1933, 1937–1938, 1946–1949, 1950–1952, 1964–1966, 1967–1975, 1978–1983, 1984–1985, 1987–1988
- Second Tier: 1893–1900, 1927–1929, 1933–1937, 1938–39, 1949–1950, 1952–1964, 1966–1967, 1975–1978, 1983–1984, 1985–1987, 1988–1994, 1995–2001, 2007–2014, 2015–present
- Third Tier: 1994–1995, 2001–2002, 2003–2007, 2014–2015
- Fourth Tier: 2002–2003

== Honours ==
=== National honours ===
- Scottish Cup
  - Winners: 1921–22
  - Runners-up: 1947–48
- Scottish League Cup
  - Runners-up: 1963–64
- Scottish Challenge Cup
  - Runners-up: 1992
- Scottish Football League
  - Runners-up: 1916–17²
- Scottish First Division/Division Two
  - Champions: (6) 1949–50¹, 1963–64¹, 1966–67¹, 1977–78, 1983–84, 1986–1987
  - Runners-up: (4) 1899–1900¹, 1928–29¹, 1936–37¹, 2012–13
- Scottish Second Division/League One
  - Champions: (3) 1994–95, 2006–07, 2014–15³
  - Runners-up: 2005–06
- Scottish Third Division
  - Champions: 2002–03

=== Other honours ===
- Renfrewshire Cup
  - Winners: 52 times
  - Runners-up: 42 times
- Great War Shield
  - Winners: 1914–15
  - Runners-up: 1917–18
- Southern Football League
  - Runners-up: 1942-43
- Southern League Cup
  - Runners-up: 1941–42
- SFL Reserve League South
  - Runners-up: 2012–13
- SPFL Development League West
  - Champions: 2015–16, 2017-18
  - Runners-up: 2016–17
- Club Academy Scotland U16/17 South/West League
  - Champions: 2014–15
  - Runners-up: 2015–16

¹ Known as Division II at the time
² Known as Division I at the time
³ Known as SPFL League One at the time

== Records ==
- Best league position – 2nd in First Division (Old) (1916–1917)
- Best Scottish Cup performance – winners (1921–1922)
- Best League Cup performance – runners-up (1963–1964)
- Best Challenge Cup performance – runners-up (1992–1993)
- Victory – 21–0 v Howwood (1886–87 Renfrewshire Cup)
- Defeat – 1–10 v Port Glasgow Athletic (5 May 1894), St Bernard's (14 October 1933)
- Home attendance – 23,500 v Celtic (1922)
- Goals in one season – Allan McGraw (58 in 1963–1964)
- Most league appearances – Derek Collins (534)
- Most league goals – Allan McGraw (117)
- Record signing – Janne Lindberg – £250k (including Marko Rajamäki) from MyPa-47
- Record sale – Derek Lilley – £500k to Leeds United

== Players ==
=== Current squad ===
As of 18 September 2026

Note: Flags indicate national team as defined under FIFA eligibility rules; some limited exceptions apply. Players may hold more than one non-FIFA nationality.

No.	Pos.	Nation	Player
1	GK	ENG	Elyh Harrison (on loan from Manchester United)
2	DF	SCO	Cammy Ballantyne
4	DF	USA	Christopher Cupps (on loan from Chicago Fire)
5	DF	ENG	Phil Croker (on loan from Crewe Alexandra)
6	DF	NGR	Calvin Okike (on loan from Hull City)
7	MF	SCO	Michael Garrity
8	MF	SCO	Grant Savoury
9	FW	AUS	Jayden Gorman
10	FW	SCO	Eamonn Brophy
12	MF	USA	Dylan Borso (on loan from Chicago Fire)
14	FW	ENG	Zach Robinson
17	MF	ENG	Sahil Bashir (on loan from Huddersfield Town)
19	MF	SCO	Kerr Robertson

No.	Pos.	Nation	Player
20	MF	SCO	Callum Sandilands (on loan from Hearts)
21	MF	SCO	Grant Gillespie (captain)
23	DF	SCO	Jackson Longridge
25	MF	SCO	MacKenzie Carse
27	MF	SCO	Iain Wilson
29	FW	SCO	Michael O'Halloran
31	GK	SCO	Brian Kinnear
36	MF	SCO	Jaiden Lang
37	MF	SCO	Calan Burgess
39	MF	SCO	Olivet Okunzuwa
40	MF	SCO	Aaron Greenock
47	MF	SCO	Harry Cochrane
52	DF	Jersey	Laiith Fairnie

=== On loan ===
Note: Flags indicate national team as defined under FIFA eligibility rules; some limited exceptions apply. Players may hold more than one non-FIFA nationality.

No.	Pos.	Nation	Player
11	MF	SCO	Bobby McLuckie (on loan at Peterhead)
28	MF	SCO	Louie Murphy (co-operation loan with Renfrew)
30	MF	Jersey	Joey O'Toole (co-operation loan with Renfrew)

No.	Pos.	Nation	Player
35	MF	SCO	Dean Black (co-operation loan with Renfrew)
41	GK	SCO	Sam Murdoch (on loan at Drumchapel United)

== Non-playing staff ==
=== Board of directors ===
Name	Role
Director	Graham Barr
Director	Paul Farren
Director	David Whitton
Finance director	Kenneth Weldin

=== Management ===
Name	Role
Interim manager	Michael O'Halloran
Assistant manager Head of youth academy & emerging talent	Gary Miller
Goalkeeping coach	Lee Hollis
Chief scout	Willie Paterson
Physiotherapist	Alyson Fielding
Sports scientist	Murray Kinnaird
Kit manager	Derek Lothian

== Player records ==
All statistics are for league matches, post-World War II.

Top goalscorers
#	Name	Period at club	Apps	Goals
1	(Scotland) Allan McGraw	1961–1966	136	117
2	(Scotland) Andy Ritchie	1976–1983	213	100
3	(Scotland) Rowan Alexander	1986–1995	310	98
4	(England) Peter Weatherson	2003–2013	323	93
5	(Scotland) Tommy Orr	1946–1958	257	86
6	(Scotland) Eddie Beaton	1956–1960	110	83
6	(Scotland) Derek Lilley	1991–1997; 2005–2007	232	83
8	(Scotland) Joe Mason	1966–1973	186	76
9	(Scotland) Alec Linwood	1951–1955	101	72
10	(Scotland) John McNeil	1975–1991	328	67

Most appearances
#	Name	Period at club	Apps
1	(Scotland) Derek Collins	1987–1999; 2001–2005	534
2	(Scotland) David Wylie	1985–1999	482
3	(Scotland) Jim Holmes	1976–1988	437
4	(Scotland) Davie Hayes	1970–1984	353
5	(Scotland) John McNeil	1975–1991	328
6	(England) Peter Weatherson	2003–2013	323
7	(Scotland) Jim McAlister	2002–2010; 2018–2021	312
8	(Scotland) Rowan Alexander	1986–1995	310
9	(Scotland) George Anderson	1969–1981; 1985–1987	280
10	(England) Roy Baines	1972–1977; 1978–1983	271
10	(Scotland) Chris Millar	2003–2008; 2018–2021	271

=== Top league goalscorers by season (post-war) ===
In progress

- Scottish unless stated

Season	Name	Goals	Division
1946–47	Ross Henderson	10	Premier Division
1947–48	Tommy Orr	14	Premier Division
1948–49	Neil Mochan	13	Premier Division
1949–50	Neil Mochan	24	First Division
1950–51	Neil Mochan	20	Premier Division
1951–52	Alec Linwood	19	Premier Division
1952–53	Bob Gibson; Alec Linwood	17	First Division
1953–54	Alec Linwood; John Hannigan	22	First Division
1954–55	Alec Linwood	14	First Division
1955–56	Bob Gibson	33	First Division
1956–57	Eddie Beaton	18	First Division
1957–58	Eddie Beaton	25	First Division
1958–59	Eddie Beaton	33	First Division
1959–60	Charlie Stewart	11	First Division
1960–61	Billy Craig	11	First Division
1961–62	Allan McGraw	16	First Division
1962–63	Allan McGraw	29	First Division
1963–64	Allan McGraw	51	First Division
1964–65	Allan McGraw	12	Premier Division
1965–66	Allan McGraw; David Watson	8	Premier Division
1966–67	Joe Harper	29	First Division
1967–68	Joe Mason	15	Premier Division
1968–69	Joe Harper	25	Premier Division
1969–70	Billy Osborne	11	Premier Division
1970–71	Joe Mason	9	Premier Division
1971–72	Donald Gillies	9	Premier Division
1972–73	Donald Gillies	14	Premier Division
1973–74	Hugh McIlmoyle	8	Premier Division
1974–75	John Hazel	6	Premier Division
1975–76	John Goldthorpe; Ian Harley; Richard Sharp	22	First Division
1976–77	Andy Ritchie	22	First Division
1977–78	John Goldthorpe; Andy Ritchie	20	First Division
1978–79	Andy Ritchie	22	Premier Division
1979–80	Andy Ritchie	19	Premier Division
1980–81	Andy Ritchie	8	Premier Division
1981–82	Andy Ritchie	6	Premier Division
1982–83	James Rooney	7	Premier Division
1983–84	John McNeil	17	First Division
1984–85	James Gillespie	5	Premier Division
1985–86	John McNeil	14	First Division
1986–87	Rowan Alexander	23	First Division
1987–88	Jimmy Boag	8	Premier Division
1988–89	Rowan Alexander	11	First Division
1989–90	Rowan Alexander	11	First Division
1990–91	Dave McCabe	21	First Division
1991–92	Alex Mathie	18	First Division
1992–93	Alex Mathie	13	First Division
1993–94	Rowan Alexander	11	First Division
1994–95	Derek Lilley	16	Second Division
1995–96	Derek Lilley	14	First Division
1996–97	Derek Lilley	15	First Division
1997–98	(England) Warren Hawke	10	First Division
1998–99	Kevin Thomas	9	First Division
1999–00	Harry Curran	9	First Division
2000–01	Ross Matheson	9	First Division
2001–02	Scott Bannerman	8	Second Division
2002–03	Alex Williams	23	Third Division
2003–04	(England) Peter Weatherson; Alex Williams	15	Second Division
2004–05	Chris Millar (England) Peter Weatherson	10	Second Division
2005–06	Derek Lilley	12	Second Division
2006–07	(England) Peter Weatherson	15	Second Division
2007–08	(England) Peter Weatherson	9	First Division
2008–09	(England) Brian Wake (England) Peter Weatherson	9	First Division
2009–10	(England) Peter Weatherson	10	First Division
2010–11	Allan Jenkins	8	First Division
2011–12	Peter MacDonald	10	First Division
2012–13	Peter MacDonald	14	First Division
2013–14	Dougie Imrie	9	Championship
2014–15	Declan McManus (on loan from Aberdeen)	20	League One
2015–16	Denny Johnstone (on loan from Birmingham City)	14	Championship
2016–17	Ross Forbes	9	Championship
2017–18	Gary Harkins	8	Championship
2018–19	Bob McHugh	11	Championship
2019–20	Bob McHugh	8	Championship
2020–21	Aidan Nesbitt	4	Championship
2021–22	(England) Gozie Ugwu	8	Championship
2022–23	Robbie Muirhead	10	Championship
2023–24	Robbie Muirhead	12	Championship
2024–25	Cameron Blues (Serbia) Filip Stuparević	5	Championship
2025–26	Eamonn Brophy	6	Championship

=== National Individual Honours ===
- 2016–17 – Jim Duffy (Ladbrokes Championship Manager of the Season)
- 2014–15 – Declan McManus (SPFL League One Player of the Year)
- 2002–03 – Alex Williams (SPFA Third Division Player of the Year)
- 1994–95 – Derek McInnes (SPFA Second Division Player of the Year)
- 1994–95 – Allan McGraw (SPFA Second Division Manager of the Year)
- 1986–87 – Jim Holmes (SPFA First Division Player of the Year)
- 1984–85 – Jim Duffy (SPFA Players' Player of the Year)
- 1978–79 – Andy Ritchie (SFWA Footballer of the Year)

=== Recent internationals ===
The last signed player to earn a full international cap whilst playing for Morton – Fouad Bachirou for Comoros in 2014.

The last signed Morton player to receive international honours for Scotland was Jai Quitongo in 2016, for the under-21 side.

=== Notable players ===
To be included in this list players must have met one of the following criteria...

- Played over 100 league games for Morton
- Scored in a national cup final
- Managed the club after playing for them
- Been from a nation outside the British Isles
- Won full international honours
- (Scotland) Stephen Aitken
- (Scotland) Rowan Alexander
- (Nigeria) Efe Ambrose
- (Scotland) George Anderson
- (Scotland) John Anderson
- (Denmark) Preben Arentoft
- (Comoros) Fouad Bachirou
- (England) Roy Baines
- (Scotland) Darren Barr
- (Denmark) Per Bartram
- (Denmark) Carl Bertelsen
- (Scotland) John Boag
- (Cameroon) Andre Boe
- (Canada) Emilio Bottiglieri
- (France) Karim Boukraa
- (United States) David Brcic
- (Scotland) Jock Buchanan
- (France) Nicolas Caraux
- (United States) Dominic Cervi
- (The Gambia) Kabba-Modou Cham
- (Scotland) Ian Clinging
- (Scotland) Derek Collins
- (Scotland) Jimmy Cowan
- (Scotland) Craig Coyle
- (Scotland) Jim Duffy
- (Wales) Robert Earnshaw
- (Scotland) Dave Edwards
- (Canada) Paul Fenwick
- (Scotland) Kevin Finlayson
- (Norway) Markus Fjørtoft
- (Scotland) Ross Forbes
- (Scotland) George French
- (Canada) Luca Gasparotto
- (Scotland) Derek Gaston
- (Scotland) James Gillespie
- (Scotland) Stewart Greacen
- (Scotland) Jimmy Gourlay
- (Scotland) James Grady
- (Slovakia) Michal Habai
- (Scotland) Ryan Harding
- (Scotland) Joe Harper
- (Scotland) Paul Hartley
- (England) Warren Hawke
- (Iceland) Atli Thor Hedinsson
- (Scotland) Jim Holmes
- (Scotland) David Hopkin
- (Scotland) Bobby Houston
- (Scotland) Dougie Imrie
- (Australia) Jack Iredale
- (South Africa) Kyle Jacobs
- (Denmark) Bjarne Jensen
- (Denmark) Kai Johansen
- (Netherlands) Justin Johnson
- (Scotland) Dougie Johnstone
- (Scotland) Joe Jordan
- (Democratic Republic of the Congo) Joel Kasubandi
- (Malta) Dylan Kerr
- (Scotland) Lee Kilday
- (Scotland) Ricki Lamie
- (England) Tommy Lawton
- (Iceland) Gudgeir Leifsson
- (Scotland) Derek Lilley
- (Finland) Janne Lindberg
- (Scotland) Alec Linwood
- (Scotland) Adam Little
- (Scotland) David MacGregor
- (Denmark) John Madsen
- (Scotland) Alan Mahood
- (Australia) John Maisano
- (Scotland) Joe Mason
- (England) Stanley Matthews
- (Scotland) Ally Maxwell
- (Scotland) Jim McAlister
- (Scotland) Steve McCahill
- (Scotland) Ian McDonald
- (Scotland) Mark McGhee
- (Scotland) Allan McGraw
- (Scotland) Bob McGregor
- (Scotland) Derek McInnes
- (Scotland) Jock McIntyre
- (Scotland) Bobby McKay
- (Scotland) Andy McLaren
- (Scotland) Joe McLaughlin
- (Scotland) Alex McNab
- (Scotland) John McNeil
- (Scotland) Craig McPherson
- (Scotland) Dave McPherson
- (France) Parfait Medou-Otye
- (Scotland) Chris Millar
- (Serbia) Stefan Milojević
- (Scotland) Jimmy Mitchell
- (Scotland) Allan Moore
- (Denmark) Flemming Nielsen
- (Denmark) Leif Nielsen
- (Spain) Nacho Novo
- (Scotland) David O'Brien
- (Scotland) Garry O'Connor
- (Scotland) Alex O'Hara
- (Finland) Jaakko Oksanen
- (Netherlands) Rabin Omar
- (Scotland) Neil Orr
- (Scotland) Tommy Orr
- (Scotland) Thomas O'Ware
- (Australia) Erik Paartalu
- (Slovakia) Tomáš Peciar
- (Scotland) Stuart Rafferty
- (Finland) Marko Rajamäki
- (Scotland) Brian Reid
- (New Zealand) Stu Riddle
- (Scotland) Andy Ritchie
- (Scotland) Doug Robertson
- (Scotland) Mark Russell
- (Netherlands) Romario Sabajo
- (United States) Brian Schwake
- (England) Stan Seymour
- (Republic of Ireland) Bernie Slaven
- (Denmark) Erik Sørensen
- (Denmark) Jørn Sørensen
- (Scotland) Billy Steel
- (Scotland) Morris Stevenson
- (Scotland) Robert Stevenson
- (Scotland) Robert Stewart
- (Scotland) Hugh Strachan
- (Scotland) Gerry Sweeney
- (Scotland) Bobby Thomson
- (Denmark) Børge Thorup
- (Scotland) Michael Tidser
- (Scotland) Jim Tolmie
- (France) Jonathan Toto
- (Scotland) Tommy Turner
- (Finland) Jani Uotinen
- (Netherlands) Henk van Schaik
- (England) Peter Weatherson
- (Austria) David Witteveen
- (Scotland) Jackie Wright
- (Scotland) David Wylie
- (United States) Christopher Cupps
- (United States) Dylan Borso

=== Scottish Football Hall of Fame ===
Ex-Morton players who have been inducted into the Scottish Football Hall of Fame are listed below.

- Joe Jordan (2005)
- Jimmy Cowan (2007)

For all Greenock Morton players with a Wikipedia article, see Category:Greenock Morton F.C. players.

== Managers ==
This list does not contain caretaker managers.

- (Scotland) George Morell (1904–1908)
- (Scotland) Bob Cochrane (1908–1927)
- (Scotland) David Torrance (1928–1931)
- (Scotland) Bob Cochrane (1931–1934)
- (Scotland) Jackie Wright (1934–1938)
- (Scotland) Jimmy Davies (1939–1955)
- (Scotland) Gibby McKenzie (1955–1957)
- (Scotland) Jimmy McIntosh (1957–1960)
- (Scotland) Hal Stewart (1961–1972)
- (Scotland) Eric Smith (1972)
- (Scotland) Hal Stewart (1972–1974)
- (Denmark) Erik Sørensen (1974–1975)
- (Scotland) Joe Gilroy (1975–1976)
- (Scotland) Benny Rooney (1976–1983)
- (Scotland) Allan Feeney (1983)
- (Scotland) Tommy McLean (1983–1984)
- (Scotland) Willie McLean (1984–1985)
- (Scotland) Allan McGraw (1985–1997)
- (Scotland) Billy Stark (1997–2000)
- (Scotland) Ian McCall (2000)
- (Scotland) Allan Evans (2000–2001)
- (Scotland) Ally Maxwell (2001)
- (Scotland) Peter Cormack (2001–2002)
- (Scotland) Dave McPherson (2002)
- (Scotland) John McCormack (2002–2004)
- (Scotland) Jim McInally (2004–2008)
- (Scotland) Davie Irons (2008–2009)
- (Scotland) James Grady (2009–2010)
- (Scotland) Allan Moore (2010–2013)
- (Northern Ireland) Kenny Shiels (2013–2014)
- (Scotland) Jim Duffy (2014–2018)
- (Scotland) Ray McKinnon (2018)
- (Finland) Jonatan Johansson (2018–2019)
- (Scotland) David Hopkin (2019–2020)
- (Scotland) Gus MacPherson (2021)
- (Scotland) Dougie Imrie (2021–2025)
- (Scotland) Ian Murray (2025–2026)

== Scottish Cup record ==
Morton first entered the Scottish Cup in 1877–78 season, and won it once in 1922. Over the course of Morton's time in the competition it has changed format seven times, to its current format of 8 rounds and 2 preliminary rounds.

- Between 2012–13 and 2014–15 there were 8 rounds plus a preliminary round.
- Between 2007–08 and 2011–12 there were 8 rounds.
- Between 1970–71 and 2006–07 there were 7 rounds.
- Between 1957–58 and 1969–70 there were 5 rounds plus a preliminary round.
- Between 1954–55 and 1956–57 there were 9 rounds.
- Between 1912–13 and 1953–54 there were 6 rounds.
- Between 1895–96 and 1911–12 there were 5 rounds.

So far Morton have finished the competition in the following rounds, this many times.

- Finals – 2 (last 1948)
- Semi-finals – 5 (last 1981)
- Quarter-finals – 16 (last 2024)

== European record ==
Season	Competition	Round	Opponent	Home	Away	Aggregate
1968–69	Inter-Cities Fairs Cup	First round	(England) Chelsea	3–4	0–5	3–9
