= List of Scottish football transfers 2010–11 =

This is a list of Scottish football transfers for the 2010–11 season.

Only moves featuring at least one 2010–11 Scottish Premier League club or one 2010–11 Scottish First Division club are listed.

== May 2010 - December 2010 ==
Date	Name	Moving from	Moving to	Fee
4 May 2010	Tony Bullock	Dundee	Livingston	Free
12 May 2010	Greg Ross	Dunfermline Athletic	Valur	Free
13 May 2010	Jamie Adams	Kilmarnock	St Johnstone	Free
15 May 2010	Erik Paartalu	Greenock Morton	Brisbane Roar	Free
15 May 2010	Ryan McGuffie	Greenock Morton	Queen of the South	Free
15 May 2010	Daniel Carmichael	Gretna 2008	Queen of the South	Free
19 May 2010	Michael Stewart	Heart of Midlothian	Gençlerbirliği	Free
19 May 2010	Rory McArdle	Rochdale	Aberdeen	Free
20 May 2010	Jim McAlister	Greenock Morton	Hamilton Academical	Free
20 May 2010	Willie Dyer	Brechin City	Raith Rovers	Free
20 May 2010	Andrew McNeil	Montrose	Raith Rovers	Free
21 May 2010	Haydn Cochrane	Celtic	Clyde	Free
21 May 2010	Gary MacKenzie	Dundee	Milton Keynes Dons	Free
21 May 2010	Nacho Novo	Rangers	Sporting de Gijón	Free
24 May 2010	Paul Murphy	Stirling Albion	Stranraer	Free
24 May 2010	Scott Arfield	Falkirk	Huddersfield Town	£400,000
25 May 2010	Gavin Skelton	Kilmarnock	Hamilton Academical	Free
26 May 2010	Kyle Allison	Inverness Caledonian Thistle	Dunfermline Athletic	Free
27 May 2010	Dominic Shimmin	Greenock Morton	Dundee	Free
27 May 2010	John Baird	Airdrie United	Raith Rovers	Free
31 May 2010	Scott Dobie	Carlisle United	St Johnstone	Free
1 June 2010	Derek Soutar	Dundee	APEP Pitsilia	Free
1 June 2010	Alex Keddie	Ross County	Dunfermline Athletic	Free
1 June 2010	Billy Mehmet	St Mirren	Gençlerbirliği	Free
1 June 2010	Jim O'Brien	Motherwell	Barnsley	Free
1 June 2010	Roddy McKenzie	Livingston	Queen of the South	Free
1 June 2010	Ross Hyslop	Motherwell	Queen of the South	Free
2 June 2010	Steven Smith	Rangers	Norwich City	Free
2 June 2010	Marc Smyth	Airdrie United	Greenock Morton	Free
2 June 2010	Kevin Kelbie	Ballymena United	Greenock Morton	Free
3 June 2010	Kevin Kyle	Kilmarnock	Heart of Midlothian	Free
3 June 2010	Andy Graham	Stirling Albion	Hamilton Academical	Free
3 June 2010	Steven Masterton	Greenock Morton	Crawley Town	Free
3 June 2010	David McKenna	Stirling Albion	Brechin City	Free
4 June 2010	David O'Brien	Stirling Albion	Greenock Morton	Free
6 June 2010	Mark Kerr	Aberdeen	Asteras Tripolis	Free
7 June 2010	Lee Hollis	Airdrie United	Motherwell	Free
7 June 2010	Steve Lovell	Partick Thistle	Bournemouth	Free
7 June 2010	Richie Hart	Dundee	Östersunds FK	Loan
8 June 2010	Stephen McKeown	Partick Thistle	Ayr United	Free
8 June 2010	Darren Barr	Falkirk	Heart of Midlothian	Free
9 June 2010	Graeme Holmes	Dunfermline Athletic	Greenock Morton	Free
9 June 2010	Scott McBride	Cowdenbeath	Raith Rovers	Undisclosed
10 June 2010	Angelis Charalambous	Anorthosis Famagusta	Motherwell	Free
10 June 2010	Allan McManus	Greenock Morton	Dumbarton	Free
10 June 2010	Iain Russell	Greenock Morton	Livingston	Free
10 June 2010	David van Zanten	Hamilton Academical	St Mirren	Free
11 June 2010	Atli Gregersen	Vikingur	Ross County	Free
11 June 2010	Mark Millar	Celtic	Falkirk	Free
15 June 2010	Darren McGregor	Cowdenbeath	St Mirren	Undisclosed
15 June 2010	Edwin de Graaf	NAC Breda	Hibernian	Free
18 June 2010	Ross Campbell	Dunfermline Athletic	Dumbarton	Free
18 June 2010	Kallum Higginbotham	Rochdale	Falkirk	Free
18 June 2010	Pedro Moutinho	Falkirk	AEP Paphos	Free
18 June 2010	Scott Muirhead	Dunfermline Athletic	Stirling Lions	Free
20 June 2010	Darren Smith	Raith Rovers	Alloa Athletic	Free
21 June 2010	Paul McQuade	Cowdenbeath	St Mirren	Undisclosed
21 June 2010	Barry Douglas	Queen's Park	Dundee United	Free
21 June 2010	Simon Ford	Kilmarnock	Chesterfield	Free
22 June 2010	Darren McCormack	Hibernian	Ross County	Free
24 June 2010	Stuart Nelson	Aberdeen	Notts County	Free
28 June 2010	Peter Bradley	Cowdenbeath	St Mirren	Undisclosed
28 June 2010	Jason Marr	Celtic	Falkirk	Loan
28 June 2010	Zheng Zhi	Celtic	Guangzhou FC	Free
29 June 2010	Stewart Kean	Queen of the South	Greenock Morton	Free
29 June 2010	Iain Gray	St Mirren	Clyde	Free
30 June 2010	Robert Sloan	Raith Rovers	East Fife	Free
1 July 2010	Alex Walker	Greenock Morton	East Stirlingshire	Free
1 July 2010	Charlie Mulgrew	Aberdeen	Celtic	Free
1 July 2010	Scott Fox	Queen of the South	Dundee	Free
1 July 2010	Kenny Deuchar	St Johnstone	Falkirk	Free
1 July 2010	Mark Corcoran	Partick Thistle	Ross County	Free
1 July 2010	Darren Randolph	Charlton Athletic	Motherwell	Free
1 July 2010	Davide Grassi	Aberdeen	Sorrento	Free
1 July 2010	Koki Mizuno	Celtic	Kashiwa Reysol	Free
1 July 2010	Cleveland Taylor	Brentford	St Johnstone	Free
1 July 2010	Giles Coke	Motherwell	Sheffield Wednesday	Free
2 July 2010	Jackie McNamara	Falkirk	Partick Thistle	Free
2 July 2010	Cha Du-Ri	SC Freiburg	Celtic	Free
2 July 2010	Kevin Finlayson	Greenock Morton	Clyde	Free
2 July 2010	Gerry McLauchlan	Queen of the South	Brechin City	Free
2 July 2010	Ewan Moyes	Hibernian	Brechin City	Loan
2 July 2010	Callum Booth	Hibernian	Brechin City	Loan
5 July 2010	Scott Durie	Rangers	East Fife	Free
5 July 2010	Jack Ross	St Mirren	Hamilton Academical	Free
5 July 2010	Kris Boyd	Rangers	Middlesbrough	Free
5 July 2010	Gil Blumstein	Hapoel Be'er Sheva	Inverness Caledonian Thistle	Free
5 July 2010	Max Johnson	Newcastle United	Inverness Caledonian Thistle	Free
5 July 2010	Colin Cameron	Dundee	Cowdenbeath	Free
5 July 2010	Josh Magennis	Cardiff City	Aberdeen	Free
5 July 2010	David Stephens	Norwich City	Hibernian	Undisclosed
6 July 2010	Andy Dorman	St Mirren	Crystal Palace	Free
7 July 2010	Scott Gallacher	Rangers	Forfar Athletic	Loan
8 July 2010	Chris Smith	St Mirren	Dunfermline Athletic	Free
8 July 2010	Filip Mentel	Manchester City	Dundee United	Free
8 July 2010	Michael Hart	Preston North End	Hibernian	Free
8 July 2010	Luca Santonocito	Celtic	Milan	Free
9 July 2010	Brian Allison	Falkirk	Stirling Albion	Free
9 July 2010	Martyn Corrigan	Partick Thistle	Stirling Albion	Free
9 July 2010	Ryan Borris	Ayr United	Stirling Albion	Free
10 July 2010	Josh Falkingham	St Johnstone	Arbroath	Free
10 July 2010	Jure Travner	Watford	St Mirren	Loan
11 July 2010	Michael Andrews	Falkirk	East Stirlingshire	Loan
12 July 2010	Joe Ledley	Cardiff City	Celtic	Free
13 July 2010	Gareth Wardlaw	Cowdenbeath	St Mirren	Undisclosed
13 July 2010	Stephen McManus	Celtic	Middlesbrough	£1,500,000
13 July 2010	Mark Howard	St Mirren	Aberdeen	Free
13 July 2010	Craig Samson	Ayr United	St Mirren	Free
14 July 2010	Graham Carey	Celtic	Huddersfield Town	Loan
14 July 2010	Jonathan Tuffey	Partick Thistle	Inverness Caledonian Thistle	Free
15 July 2010	Pat Clarke	Dundee	Dunfermline Athletic	Undisclosed
15 July 2010	Artur Boruc	Celtic	Fiorentina	Undisclosed
15 July 2010	Sam Parkin	Walsall	St Johnstone	Free
16 July 2010	Grant Evans	Hamilton Academical	Greenock Morton	Loan
16 July 2010	Kevin Thomson	Rangers	Middlesbrough	£2,000,000
16 July 2010	Daryl Murphy	Sunderland	Celtic	£1,500,000
16 July 2010	Kevin McCann	Hibernian	Inverness Caledonian Thistle	Loan
16 July 2010	Mark McAusland	Queen of the South	St Mirren	Undisclosed
16 July 2010	Allan Johnston	St Mirren	Queen of the South	Free
17 July 2010	Nicky Riley	Hamilton Academical	Dundee	Free
17 July 2010	Stephen O'Donnell	St Mirren	Dundee	Free
19 July 2010	Alex Mitchell	Gretna 2008	Queen of the South	Loan
19 July 2010	Kieron Stallard	Falkirk	Airdrie United	Loan
19 July 2010	Euen Grant	Falkirk	Airdrie United	Loan
20 July 2010	Jordan Halsman	Motherwell	Annan Athletic	Loan
20 July 2010	Steven Lawless	Motherwell	Annan Athletic	Loan
20 July 2010	Fouad Bachirou	Paris St. Germain CFA	Greenock Morton	Free
21 July 2010	Danny Wilson	Rangers	Liverpool	£2,000,000
21 July 2010	Darren Smith	Motherwell	Ross County	Free
22 July 2010	Gary Irvine	St Johnstone	Dundee	Free
23 July 2010	James McArthur	Hamilton Academical	Wigan Athletic	£400,000
23 July 2010	Jamie Mole	Heart of Midlothian	Raith Rovers	Loan
23 July 2010	Calum Reidford	Clyde	Stirling Albion	Free
23 July 2010	Derek Colquhoun	Falkirk AFC	Stirling Albion	Free
23 July 2010	Scott Buist	Alloa Athletic	Stirling Albion	Free
23 July 2010	John Kane	Creighton Bluejays	Stirling Albion	Free
24 July 2010	Marc McKenzie	East Stirlingshire	Cowdenbeath	Free
24 July 2010	Ludovic Roy	Queen of the South	Cowdenbeath	Free
24 July 2010	Greig Stewart	Syngenta Juveniles	Cowdenbeath	Free
24 July 2010	Mark Ridgers	Heart of Midlothian	Airdrie United	Loan
24 July 2010	Chris Innes	St Mirren	Inverness Caledonian Thistle	Free
26 July 2010	Yoann Folly	Plymouth Argyle	Aberdeen	Free
26 July 2010	Efrain Juarez	UNAM Pumas	Celtic	Undisclosed
26 July 2010	Scott Vernon	Colchester United	Aberdeen	Free
26 July 2010	Steve Tosh	Queen of the South	Cove Rangers	Free
26 July 2010	Sean Lynch	Falkirk	St Mirren	Free
27 July 2010	Gary Hooper	Scunthorpe United	Celtic	£2,400,000
27 July 2010	Lee Bryce	Raith Rovers	East Fife	Free
27 July 2010	Enoch Showunmi	Falkirk	Tranmere Rovers	Free
27 July 2010	Paul McGowan	Celtic	St Mirren	Loan
27 July 2010	David Buchanan	Bury	Hamilton Academical	Free
27 July 2010	Grant Gallagher	Celtic	Stranraer	Free
27 July 2010	Euan McLean	St Johnstone	Forfar Athletic	Free
28 July 2010	Paul Hartley	Bristol City	Aberdeen	Free
28 July 2010	Iain Flannigan	Kilmarnock	Partick Thistle	Free
29 July 2010	Jamie Adams	St Johnstone	Dundee	Loan
29 July 2010	Beram Kayal	Maccabi Haifa	Celtic	£1,200,000
29 July 2010	Maroš Klimpl	Dundee	Viktoria Žižkov	Free
30 July 2010	Stuart McCaffrey	St Johnstone	Greenock Morton	Free
30 July 2010	Paul Sludden	Falkirk	Altony City SC	Free
30 July 2010	Marcus Haber	West Bromwich Albion	St Johnstone	Loan
30 July 2010	Ryan McWilliams	Greenock Morton	Ayr United	Free
30 July 2010	Ryan McCord	Dundee United	Airdrie United	Loan
30 July 2010	Dale Hilson	Dundee United	Forfar Athletic	Loan
30 July 2010	Ross McCord	Dundee United	Montrose	Loan
30 July 2010	Kenny Gillet	Barnet	Inverness Caledonian Thistle	Free
31 July 2010	Craig Barr	Queen of the South	Livingston	Free
1 August 2010	David Silva	CSKA Sofia	Kilmarnock	Free
2 August 2010	Paul Caddis	Celtic	Swindon Town	£350,000 (2 players)
2 August 2010	Kevin Smith	Dundee United	Notts County	Free
2 August 2010	Simon Ferry	Celtic	Swindon Town	£350,000 (2 players)
2 August 2010	Marián Kello	FBK Kaunas	Heart of Midlothian	Free
3 August 2010	Dene Shields	Raith Rovers	Hamrun Spartans	Free
3 August 2010	Steven Watt	Ross County	Grimsby Town	Free
4 August 2010	Gary McDonald	Aberdeen	Hamilton Academical	Free
5 August 2010	Ben Gordon	Chelsea	Kilmarnock	Loan
6 August 2010	Jon McShane	St Mirren	Dumbarton	Loan
8 August 2010	Netan Sansara	Walsall	Dundee	Free
9 August 2010	Donovan Simmonds	Greenock Morton	Rushden & Diamonds	Free
9 August 2010	Stephen Elliott	Preston North End	Heart of Midlothian	Free
9 August 2010	Peter Enckelman	Cardiff City	St Johnstone	Free
9 August 2010	Richard Vauls	Stafford Rangers	Cowdenbeath	Free
9 August 2010	Lee Sibanda	Cupar Hearts	Cowdenbeath	Free
9 August 2010	Mark Smith	Motherwell	Cowdenbeath	Free
10 August 2010	Kyle Letheren	Plymouth Argyle	Kilmarnock	Free
11 August 2010	Blair Young	Falkirk	Bo'ness	Free
12 August 2010	Aiden McGeady	Celtic	Spartak Moscow	£9,500,000
12 August 2010	Marvin Andrews	Queen of the South	Wrexham	Free
12 August 2010	James Beattie	Stoke City	Rangers	Undisclosed
12 August 2010	Esteban Casagolda	Brussels	Motherwell	Free
12 August 2010	Joël Thomas	Colchester United	Hamilton Academical	Free
12 August 2010	Jon Routledge	Wigan Athletic	Hamilton Academical	Loan
13 August 2010	Nick Blackman	Blackburn Rovers	Motherwell	Loan
13 August 2010	Thomas Flynn	Hibernian	Alloa Athletic	Loan
13 August 2010	Gordon Smith	Heart of Midlothian	Stirling Albion	Loan
13 August 2010	Jerome Heeking	L'Academy des Sports	Stirling Albion	Free
13 August 2010	Yohan Mathis	L'Academy des Sports	Stirling Albion	Free
13 August 2010	Jeremy Judith	L'Academy des Sports	Stirling Albion	Free
13 August 2010	James Dayton	Crystal Palace	Kilmarnock	Free
16 August 2010	Daniel Majstorović	AEK Athens	Celtic	Free
18 August 2010	Emilio Izaguirre	Motagua	Celtic	Undisclosed
18 August 2010	Scott Bain	Aberdeen	Elgin City	Loan
18 August 2010	Mohamadou Sissoko	Udinese	Kilmarnock	Loan
18 August 2010	Ben Hutchinson	Celtic	Lincoln City	Loan
18 August 2010	Darren O'Dea	Celtic	Ipswich Town	Loan
19 August 2010	Nicky Clark	Aberdeen	Peterhead	Free
19 August 2010	Vladimír Weiss	Manchester City	Rangers	Loan
19 August 2010	Morten Rasmussen	Celtic	Mainz	Loan
19 August 2010	Scott Ross	Aberdeen	Peterhead	Loan
19 August 2010	Mark Forbes	Cowdenbeath	Kelty Hearts	Free
19 August 2010	Neil McCabe	Cowdenbeath	Kelty Hearts	
20 August 2010	Lee Naylor	Celtic	Cardiff City	Free
20 August 2010	Nikica Jelavić	Rapid Vienna	Rangers	£4,000,000
20 August 2010	Alan Maybury	Colchester United	St Johnstone	Free
20 August 2010	Josh Thompson	Celtic	Rochdale	Loan
21 August 2010	Adrian Mrowiec	Kaunas	Heart of Midlothian	Free
24 August 2010	Fraser Forster	Newcastle United	Celtic	Loan
24 August 2010	Nigel Hasselbaink	PSV Eindhoven	Hamilton Academical	Free
25 August 2010	Daniel McKay	Kilmarnock	Ayr United	Loan
26 August 2010	Harry Forrester	Aston Villa	Kilmarnock	Loan
27 August 2010	Johnny Flynn	Blackburn Rovers	Ross County	Free
28 August 2010	David Witteveen	Heart of Midlothian	Dundee	Loan
28 August 2010	Marc-Antoine Fortuné	Celtic	West Bromwich Albion	£2,800,000
30 August 2010	DaMarcus Beasley	Rangers	Hannover 96	Free
31 August 2010	Alexei Eremenko	Metalist Kharkiv	Kilmarnock	Loan
31 August 2010	Darryl Duffy	Bristol Rovers	Hibernian	Loan
31 August 2010	Nick Hegarty	Grimsby Town	St Mirren	Free
31 August 2010	John Marsden	Celtic	Hamilton Academical	Loan
31 August 2010	Richard Foster	Aberdeen	Rangers	Loan
31 August 2010	Andrius Velička	Rangers	Aberdeen	Loan
31 August 2010	Francis Dickoh	Utrecht	Hibernian	Free
31 August 2010	Scott Severin	Watford	Dundee United	Free
31 August 2010	Damián Casalinuovo	Dundee United	Hamilton Academical	Undisclosed
31 August 2010	Stirling Smith	Aberdeen	Dumbarton	Loan
31 August 2010	Anthony Stokes	Hibernian	Celtic	£1,200,000
31 August 2010	Francisco Sandaza	Dundee United	Brighton & Hove Albion	Free
31 August 2010	Steven Howarth	Clyde	Motherwell	Undisclosed
1 September 2010	Njazi Kuqi	Stevenage Borough	Dundee	Free
2 September 2010	Gavin Reilly	Queen of the South	Gretna 2008	Loan
2 September 2010	Connor Rennie	Dundee	Deveronvale	Loan
4 September 2010	Tam McManus	Ayr United	Falkirk	Free
6 September 2010	Nikola Vujadinovic	Udinese	Aberdeen	Loan
6 September 2010	Jim Goodwin	Huddersfield Town	Hamilton Academical	Free
8 September 2010	Stuart Duff	Aberdeen	Inverness Caledonian Thistle	Free
10 September 2010	Sean Fitzharris	Celtic	Greenock Morton	Loan
12 September 2010	Vitor Lima	Falkirk	Doxa Drama	Free
14 September 2010	Valdas Trakys	Panserraikos	Hibernian	Free
14 September 2010	Jennison Myrie-Williams	Dundee United	St Johnstone	Free
16 September 2010	Jack Ross	St Mirren	Dunfermline Athletic	Free
16 September 2010	Rudolf Skácel	AEL	Heart of Midlothian	Free
16 September 2010	Rui Miguel	CSKA Sofia	Kilmarnock	Free
20 September 2010	Milan Mišůn	Celtic	Dundee	Loan
24 September 2010	Jonathan Toto	AC Legnano	Greenock Morton	Free (amateur)
24 September 2010	Jamie McCluskey	Wrexham	St Mirren	Free
25 September 2010	Eddie Malone	Dundee	Ayr United	Free
1 October 2010	Sylvano Comvalius	Birkirkara	Stirling Albion	Free
6 October 2010	Javier Amaya	Raith Rovers	Annan Athletic	Free
8 October 2010	Mark Smith	Cowdenbeath	Bellshill Athletic	Loan
8 October 2010	Steven Bennett	Cowdenbeath	Bellshill Athletic	Loan
20 October 2010	Declan Gallacher	Celtic	Stranraer	Loan
21 October 2010	Steven Old	Kilmarnock	Cowdenbeath	Loan
22 October 2010	Daniele Giordano	Celtic	Montrose	Loan
29 October 2010	Anthony Bolger	Aberdeen	Brechin City	Loan
2 November 2010	Scott Fox	Dundee	Partick Thistle	Free (amateur)
3 November 2010	Ally Love	St Mirren	Stenhousemuir	Loan
3 November 2010	Mark McLennan	St Mirren	Stenhousemuir	Loan
4 November 2010	Olivier Kapo	Wigan Athletic	Celtic	Free
9 November 2010	Salim Kerkar	Gueugnon	Rangers	Free
10 November 2010	Craig McLeish	Falkirk	Dumbarton	Loan
11 November 2010	Colin McMenamin	Dundee	Queen of the South	Free
12 November 2010	Darren Young	Dundee	Greenock Morton	Free
12 November 2010	Stuart Bannigan	Partick Thistle	Ayr United	Loan
13 November 2010	Sean O'Connor	Queen of the South	Annan Athletic	Loan
18 November 2010	Dylan McGowan	Heart of Midlothian	East Fife	Loan
23 November 2010	Charlie Grant	Dundee	East Stirlingshire	Free
25 November 2010	Neil MacFarlane	Greenock Morton	Annan Athletic	Free
26 November 2010	Gary Wales	Unattached	Raith Rovers	Free
8 December 2010	Dylan McGeouch	Rangers	Celtic	Free
10 December 2010	Dominic Cervi	Celtic	Dundee	Loan
24 December 2010	David McNamee	Plymouth Argyle	Aberdeen	Free

== January 2011 - May 2011 ==
Date	Name	Moving from	Moving to	Fee
1 January 2011	Freddie Ljungberg	Chicago Fire	Celtic	Free
1 January 2011	Michael Doyle	Kilmarnock	Stirling Albion	Free
2 January 2011	Sol Bamba	Hibernian	Leicester City	Undisclosed
4 January 2011	Lewis Coult	Arniston Rangers	Cowdenbeath	Undisclosed
6 January 2011	Jim Goodwin	Hamilton Academical	St Mirren	Free
7 January 2011	Sean Fitzharris	Celtic	Greenock Morton	Loan
7 January 2011	Tony Watt	Airdrie United	Celtic	£200,000
7 January 2011	Myles Anderson	Leyton Orient	Aberdeen	Free
7 January 2011	Jason Marr	Celtic	Ross County	Loan
11 January 2011	Dougie Hill	Raith Rovers	Brechin City	Loan
11 January 2011	Craig Wedderburn	Raith Rovers	Arbroath	Loan
11 January 2011	Graeme Beveridge	Raith Rovers	Musselburgh Athletic	Loan
11 January 2011	Mickaël Antoine-Curier	Dundee	Hamilton Academical	Free
13 January 2011	Steven Robb	St Mirren	Thai Port	Free
13 January 2011	Nick Blackman	Blackburn Rovers	Aberdeen	Loan
13 January 2011	Robert Milsom	Fulham	Aberdeen	Free
13 January 2011	Marc Fitzpatrick	Motherwell	Ross County	Free
13 January 2011	Benjamin Laurant	Le Havre	Kilmarnock	Free
13 January 2011	Billy Berntsson	Sundsvall	Kilmarnock	Free
14 January 2011	Derek Lyle	Hamilton Academical	Greenock Morton	Free
15 January 2011	Alan Gow	Motherwell	Notts County	Free
16 January 2011	Mark Reynolds	Motherwell	Sheffield Wednesday	Undisclosed
18 January 2011	Kenny Deuchar	Falkirk	Livingston	Free
19 January 2011	Jos Hooiveld	Celtic	Copenhagen	Loan
20 January 2011	Craig Hill	Dundee United	Airdrie United	Free
20 January 2011	Steve Jones	Walsall	Motherwell	Loan
20 January 2011	Liam Buchanan	Partick Thistle	Dunfermline Athletic	Undisclosed
21 January 2011	Kenny Miller	Rangers	Bursaspor	Undisclosed
21 January 2011	Stephen Stirling	Rangers	Stirling Albion	Loan
21 January 2011	Archie Campbell	Rangers	Cowdenbeath	Loan
25 January 2011	Martin Scott	Ross County	Hibernian	£80,000
25 January 2011	Richie Towell	Celtic	Hibernian	Loan
25 January 2011	Matt Thornhill	Nottingham Forest	Hibernian	Free
25 January 2011	James Chambers	Shamrock Rovers	Hamilton Academical	Free
25 January 2011	Aaron Wildig	Cardiff City	Hamilton Academical	Loan
26 January 2011	Aaron Doran	Blackburn Rovers	Inverness Caledonian Thistle	Loan
26 January 2011	Willy Aubameyang	Milan	Kilmarnock	Free
27 January 2011	Kris Commons	Derby County	Celtic	£300,000
27 January 2011	Leigh Griffiths	Dundee	Wolverhampton Wanderers	£150,000
28 January 2011	Kieron Stallard	Falkirk	Airdrie United	Loan
28 January 2011	Craig McLeish	Falkirk	Dumbarton	Loan
28 January 2011	Kyle Benedictus	Dundee	Montrose	Loan
28 January 2011	Milan Mišůn	Celtic	Swindon Town	Undisclosed
28 January 2011	Rory Loy	Rangers	Carlisle United	Undisclosed
28 January 2011	Pedro Moutinho	AEP Paphos	Falkirk	Loan
28 January 2011	Gavin Gunning	Blackburn Rovers	Motherwell	Loan
29 January 2011	Jure Travner	Watford	St Mirren	Free
29 January 2011	Victor Pálsson	Liverpool	Hibernian	Free
30 January 2011	David Healy	Sunderland	Rangers	Loan
31 January 2011	Merouane Zemmama	Hibernian	Middlesbrough	Undisclosed
31 January 2011	Scott Evans	Llanelli	Kilmarnock	Undisclosed
31 January 2011	Jakub Divis	Tatran Prešov	Hibernian	Loan
31 January 2011	Alex MacDonald	Burnley	Inverness Caledonian Thistle	Loan
31 January 2011	Tom Elliott	Leeds United	Hamilton Academical	Free
31 January 2011	James Beattie	Rangers	Blackpool	Loan
31 January 2011	Scott Dobie	St Johnstone	Bradford City	Loan
31 January 2011	Willie Gibson	Dunfermline Athletic	Crawley Town	Undisclosed
31 January 2011	Greg Fleming	Oldham Athletic	Hamilton Academical	Free
31 January 2011	Timothy van der Meulen	Ajax	Dundee United	Free
31 January 2011	Steven Smith	Norwich City	Aberdeen	Loan
31 January 2011	Kyle Bartley	Arsenal	Rangers	Loan
31 January 2011	Chris Hogg	Hibernian	Inverness Caledonian Thistle	Free
31 January 2011	Kieran Agard	Everton	Kilmarnock	Loan
31 January 2011	Conor Sammon	Kilmarnock	Wigan Athletic	£450,000
31 January 2011	Stephen Crawford	East Fife	Cowdenbeath	Free
31 January 2011	Lee Makel	Östersund	Cowdenbeath	Free
31 January 2011	Jordan Kirkpatrick	Hamilton Academical	Brechin City	Loan
31 January 2011	Steven Milne	St Johnstone	Ross County	Free
2 February 2011	Evaldas Razulis	Kaunas	Heart of Midlothian	Loan
3 February 2011	Andy Webster	Rangers	Heart of Midlothian	Free
3 February 2011	Kevin Rutkiewicz	St Johnstone	Dunfermline Athletic	Loan
8 February 2011	Francis Jeffers	Newcastle United Jets	Motherwell	Free
10 February 2011	Ross Perry	Rangers	Falkirk	Loan
10 February 2011	Bryn Halliwell	Partick Thistle	Clyde	Loan
10 February 2011	Ryan MacBeth	Partick Thistle	Clyde	Loan
10 February 2011	Dominic Shimmin	Dundee	Dover Athletic	Free
11 February 2011	Stewart Greacen	Greenock Morton	Derry City	Free
15 February 2011	Ryan McGowan	Heart of Midlothian	Partick Thistle	Loan
15 February 2011	Paul Mulrooney	Heart of Midlothian	Clyde	Loan
15 February 2011	Danny Thomson	Heart of Midlothian	Clyde	Loan
16 February 2011	Steven Ross	Ross County	Brora Rangers	Loan
18 February 2011	Marc Crosas	Celtic	FC Volga Nizhny Novgorod	Undisclosed
25 February 2011	Danny Invincibile	Kilmarnock	St Johnstone	Free
28 February 2011	Ricardo Vaz Tê	Panionios	Hibernian	Free
1 April 2011	Maurice Ross	Beijing Guoan	Motherwell	Free
