= 2010–11 Greenock Morton F.C. season =

Greenock Morton
2010–11 season
- Chairman: Douglas Rae
- Manager: James Grady (31/10/09-9/5/10); Allan Moore (26/5/10-present)
- Scottish First Division: 7th
- Scottish Cup: Fifth round (eliminated by Inverness Caledonian Thistle)
- League Cup: Second round (eliminated by St Johnstone)
- Challenge Cup: Second round (eliminated by Ross County)
- Top goalscorer: League: Allan Jenkins (8); All: Brian Graham (11)
- Highest home attendance: League: 4,626 (v Dunfermline Athletic); Cup: 3,422 (v St Mirren (RC))
- Lowest home attendance: League: 980 (v Stirling Albion); Cup: 1,339 (v Airdrie United)
- Average home league attendance: 1,913
Home colours	Away colours	Third colours

Season 2010–11 saw Greenock Morton compete in their fourth consecutive season in the First Division, having defeated Ayr United on the last day of the 2009–10 season.

== Story of the season ==
=== May ===
James Grady and his assistant Allan McManus (signed for Dumbarton) were sacked on 9 May, after eight months in charge.

Ryan McGuffie signed a pre-contract agreement with hometown club Queen of the South.

Erik Paartalu returned home to Australia to sign for Brisbane Roar.

Morton release 7 other players, although they may still be re-signed by the new manager when he is appointed. Brian Graham accepted a new deal and Colin Stewart was offered new terms. The released players were Jim McAlister (signed for Hamilton Accies), Steven Masterton (signed for Crawley Town), Alan Reid, Dominic Shimmin (signed for Dundee), Donovan Simmonds (signed for Rushden & Diamonds), Kevin Finlayson (signed for Clyde) and Alex Walker (signed for East Stirlingshire ).

Puma were announced as the new kit manufacturers for the 2010–11 season.

Allan Moore was appointed as manager on 26 May, on a three-year deal.

=== June ===
Morton made their first signing of the season on a pre-contract agreement, signing Marc Smyth from Airdrie United; however the move was only fully completed on 29 June.

Colin Stewart also signed a new contract.

Kevin Kelbie signed from Northern Irish side Ballymena United.

David O'Brien joined up with his ex-boss Moore on a free transfer from Stirling Albion.

It was announced on 7 June that Morton would play Blyth Spartans, Gateshead and Bristol Rovers in pre-season friendlies.

Graeme Holmes was signed from Dunfermline Athletic.

Moore appointed Mark McNally as his assistant.

Iain Russell rejected the contract extension in order to sign a two-year contract with Livingston.

Moore signed ex-Queen of the South striker Stewart Kean.

=== July ===
With just over a week until the competitive games begin, Morton sign defender Grant Evans on loan from Hamilton Accies.

New contracts were given to youngsters Ryan Kane and Nathan Shepherd.

David MacGregor was given another years contract with the club. This will coincide with his testimonial year at Morton.

French trialists Fouad Bachirou and Tarik Bengelloun were signed on one-year deals. It turned out however that Bengelloun required to serve a lengthy suspension for a bottle throwing incident in France, so the contract offer was rescinded. Bengelloun later returned to France to sign for Racing in Paris.

Stuart McCaffrey was signed on a one-year deal from St Johnstone to take the squad to 22.

Ryan McWilliams was released, and signed for Second Division Ayr United.

=== August ===
Morton exited both the Scottish League Cup and Scottish Challenge Cup in the second round, against St Johnstone and Ross County respectively.

In their match against Raith Rovers, Morton gave ex-Dundee fullback Eddie Malone a start as a trialist.

Neil MacFarlane was released to allow room for one more player to come in to the squad. MacFarlane eventually signed for Annan Athletic in the Third Division.

=== September ===
Celtic loaned local youngster Sean Fitzharris to Morton on 10 September after he scored a brace against them in a 4–0 Celtic victory at Lennoxtown training centre.

Cameroonian striker Jonathan Toto signed until January, when he is expected to sign for Scottish Premier League side Hearts.

Ex-Falkirk and Hibs midfielder Patrick Cregg was brought in on trial and made his début against Ross County alongside Toto, Cregg was signed by rivals St Mirren.

=== October ===
Ryan Kane and Nathan Shepherd joined Ayrshire junior side Glenafton Athletic on loan, and made their debuts in a 6–3 victory over Bellshill Athletic.

Darren Young joined the club as a trialist and made his first appearance from the bench in the draw at Cowdenbeath.

Morton were drawn away to near neighbours Dumbarton, the fifth cup meeting between the pair in two seasons.

=== November ===
Darren Young signed on a short-term contract until the end of 2010.

=== December ===
Stewart Greacen who had been at the club since 2003 (and had a previous loan spell at Cappielow) was released.

Jonathan Toto also left the club (signing for Etoile FC in March).

After the release of Greacen freed up funds (he signed for Derry City in February 2011), Darren Young was offered a new contract to the end of the season. Young signed the new contract, and the loan of Grant Evans was also extended until the end of the season.

=== January ===
Morton were drawn against Airdrie United in the Scottish Cup after their opponents defeated Beith 3–4 in a replay at Bellsdale Park.

Sean Fitzharris was loaned again from Celtic for the remainder of the season.

Derek Lyle was signed on a free transfer from Hamilton, which the manager stated would be the last incoming transfer of the season.

In their re-arranged Scottish Cup fourth round tie at Cappielow, Morton battled back from 0–2 down, with ten men, to salvage a draw and earn a replay at the Excelsior Stadium. The replay in Airdrie finished 5–2 to Morton, allowing them to progress to the fifth round to play Inverness Caledonian Thistle at the Caledonian Stadium.

=== February ===
Morton were eliminated from the Scottish Cup, after being annihilated 5–1 by Inverness, with new boy Lyle scoring a late consolation.

=== March ===
Morton youngster Declan McDaid (aged 15) became the centre of transfer speculation, and a rejected £35,000 bid from Celtic, with Aston Villa and Sunderland also scouting him.

=== April ===
Derek Lyle was arrested by Strathclyde Police, as part of Operation Neptune, on suspicion of possession of controlled substances at his home in Bishopbriggs. This later was confirmed to be "possession with intent to supply", a much more serious charge for which he and partner Nicola Mullen (29) were released on bail pending full committal.

Morton were confirmed as safe from automatic relegation on 10 April, when Stirling Albion failed to beat Dundee; condemning themselves to play in the Second Division next season.

Michael Tidser signed a new three-year contract with the club.

=== May ===
Kevin McKinlay, David MacGregor, Kevin Cuthbert, Darren Young, Graeme Holmes and Stewart Kean were all told they would be released in a mass clear-out.

First choice centre-back pairing Stuart McCaffrey and Marc Smyth signed new one-year deals.

Derek Lyle was told he would not receive a new contract in the summer, but a new deal was tabled for Carlo Monti.

Colin Stewart signed a new one-year contract.

Morton finished the season in seventh place after a disappointing defeat to already relegated Stirling Albion at the Doubletree Dunblane Stadium.

== First team transfers ==
- From end of 2009–10 season, to last match of season 2010–11

=== In ===
Player	From	League	Fee
(Scotland) Marc Smyth	Airdrie United	Scottish Football League Second Division	Free (June 2010)
(Scotland) Kevin Kelbie	(Northern Ireland) Ballymena United	IFA Premiership	Free (June 2010)
(Scotland) David O'Brien	Stirling Albion	Scottish Football League Second Division	Free (June 2010)
(Scotland) Graeme Holmes	Dunfermline Athletic	Scottish Football League First Division	Free (June 2010)
(Scotland) Stewart Kean	Queen of the South	Scottish Football League First Division	Free (June 2010)
(Scotland) Grant Evans	Hamilton Academical	Scottish Premier League	Loan (July 2010)
(France) Fouad Bachirou	(France) Paris St. Germain CFA	Championnat de France amateur	Free (July 2010)
(Scotland) Stuart McCaffrey	St Johnstone	Scottish Premier League	Free (July 2010)
(Scotland) Eddie Malone	Dundee	Scottish Football League First Division	Trial (August 2010)
(Scotland) Sean Fitzharris	Celtic	Scottish Premier League	Loan (September 2010)
(Cameroon) Jonathan Toto	(Italy) A.C. Legnano	Lega Pro Seconda Divisione	Free (September 2010)
(Republic of Ireland) Patrick Cregg	Hibernian	Scottish Premier League	Trial (September 2010)
(Scotland) Darren Young	Dundee	Scottish Football League First Division	Trial (October 2010)
(Scotland) Darren Young	Dundee	Scottish Football League First Division	Free (November 2010)
(Scotland) Sean Fitzharris	Celtic	Scottish Premier League	Loan (January 2011)
(Scotland) Derek Lyle	Hamilton Academical	Scottish Premier League	Free (January 2011)

=== Out ===
Player	To	League	Fee
(Scotland) Allan McManus	Dumbarton	Scottish Football League Second Division	Fired (May 2010)
(Scotland) James Grady	St Mirren (coach)	Scottish Premier League	Fired (May 2010)
(Scotland) Ryan McGuffie	Queen of the South	Scottish Football League First Division	Free (May 2010)
(Australia) Erik Paartalu	(Australia) Brisbane Roar	A-League	Free (May 2010)
(England) Dominic Shimmin	Dundee	Scottish Football League First Division	Free (May 2010)
(England) Donovan Simmonds	(England) Rushden & Diamonds	Conference National	Free (May 2010)
(Scotland) Alex Walker	East Stirlingshire	Scottish Football League Third Division	Free (May 2010)
(Scotland) Alan Reid	Queen of the South	Scottish Football League First Division	Free (May 2010)
(Scotland) Steven Masterton	(England) Crawley Town	Conference National	Free (May 2010)
(Scotland) Kevin Finlayson	Clyde	Scottish Football League Third Division	Free (May 2010)
(Scotland) Jim McAlister	Hamilton Academical	Scottish Premier League	Free (May 2010)
(Scotland) Iain Russell	Livingston	Scottish Football League Second Division	Free (June 2010)
(Scotland) Ryan McWilliams	Ayr United	Scottish Football League Second Division	Free (July 2010)
(Scotland) Neil MacFarlane	Annan Athletic	Scottish Football League Third Division	Free (August 2010)
(Scotland) Eddie Malone	Ayr United	Scottish Football League Second Division	Free (August 2010)
(Republic of Ireland) Patrick Cregg	St Mirren	Scottish Premier League	Free (September 2010)
(Scotland) Nathan Shepherd	Glenafton Athletic	Scottish Junior Football West Division One	Loan (October 2010)
(Scotland) Ryan Kane	Glenafton Athletic	Scottish Junior Football West Division One	Loan (October 2010)
(Scotland) Stewart Greacen	(Republic of Ireland) Derry City	League of Ireland Premier Division	Free (December 2010)
(Cameroon) Jonathan Toto	(Singapore) Etoile FC	S.League	Free (December 2010)

== Squad (that played for first team) ==
Note: Flags indicate national team as defined under FIFA eligibility rules; some limited exceptions apply. Players may hold more than one non-FIFA nationality.

No.	Pos.	Nation	Player
—	GK	SCO	Kevin Cuthbert
—	GK	SCO	Colin Stewart
—	DF	SCO	Grant Evans (on loan from Hamilton Accies)
—	DF	SCO	Stewart Greacen (released mid-season)
—	DF	SCO	Stuart McCaffrey (captain)
—	DF	SCO	David MacGregor
—	DF	SCO	Eddie Malone (trialist)
—	DF	SCO	Kevin McKinlay
—	DF	SCO	Nathan Shepherd
—	DF	SCO	Marc Smyth
—	MF	FRA	Fouad Bachirou
—	MF	EIR	Patrick Cregg (trialist)
—	MF	SCO	Graeme Holmes

No.	Pos.	Nation	Player
—	MF	SCO	Allan Jenkins
—	MF	SCO	Ryan Kane
—	MF	SCO	Carlo Monti
—	MF	SCO	David O'Brien
—	MF	SCO	Michael Tidser
—	MF	SCO	Darren Young
—	FW	SCO	Sean Fitzharris (on loan from Celtic)
—	FW	SCO	Brian Graham
—	FW	SCO	Stewart Kean
—	FW	SCO	Kevin Kelbie
—	FW	SCO	Derek Lyle
—	FW	CMR	Jonathan Toto (released mid-season)
—	FW	ENG	Peter Weatherson

== Fixtures and results ==
Win Draw Loss Upcoming fixture

=== Friendlies ===
Date	Opponents	Stadium	Result F – A	Scorers	Attendance
8 July 2010	Hamilton Academical	Battery Park, Greenock	1 – 0	Stewart Kean	Public Park
8 July 2010	(Nigeria) Nigerian Select XI	Battery Park, Greenock	4 – 2	Michael Tidser; Ryan Kane; Jamie McCluskey pen' Brian Graham	Public Park
10 July 2010	Albion Rovers	St. Andrew's High School, Coatbridge	2 – 2	Allan Jenkins; Hardy Pinto-Moreira	Public Park
13 July 2010	(England) Blyth Spartans	Croft Park, Blyth	0 – 0		285
15 July 2010	(England) Gateshead	Gateshead International Stadium, Gateshead	1 – 0	Allan Jenkins 44'	?
17 July 2010	(England) Bristol Rovers	Cappielow Park, Greenock	1 – 3	Peter Weatherson 82' (pen.)	1,037
20 July 2010	Moorcroft A.F.C. Renfrewshire Cup 2009/10 semi final	Cappielow Park, Greenock	13 – 0	Carlo Monti pen' Kevin Kelbie; Peter Weatherson pen' Graeme Holmes; Michael Tidser	?
27 July 2010	St Mirren; Renfrewshire Cup 2009/10 final	Cappielow Park, Greenock	0 – 0 PENS: 3 – 4		3,422
30 August 2010	Greenock Juniors	Cappielow Park, Greenock	3–2	?	Closed door
6 September 2010	Dumbarton	Cappielow Park, Greenock	1–4	Tarik Bengelloun	Closed door
8 September 2010	Celtic XI	Lennoxtown training centre, Glasgow	0 – 4		Closed door
28 September 2010	Motherwell	Fir Park, Motherwell	3–1	?	Closed door
5 October 2010	Airdrie United	James Y. Keanie Park, Johnstone	3–2	Brian Graham; Michael Tidser	Closed door
7 October 2010	St Mirren	James Y. Keanie Park, Johnstone	2–2	Stewart Kean; Peter Weatherson	Public Park
3 November 2010	Rangers	Murray Park, Auchenhowie	0–6		Closed door
16 November 2010	St Mirren	Cappielow Park, Greenock	3–2	Kevin Kelbie; David O'Brien; Own goal	Closed door
22 November 2010	Hamilton Academical	Cappielow Park, Greenock	3–1	Kevin Kelbie; Allan Jenkins; Own goal	Closed door
29 December 2010	Rangers	Murray Park, Auchenhowie	0–1		Closed door
4 January 2011	East Stirlingshire	Ravenscraig Regional Sports Facility, Motherwell	2 – 1	Brian Graham; Stewart Kean	Closed door
9 February 2011	Scotland u21	Cappielow Park, Greenock	3 – 4	Peter Weatherson; Trialist; Fouad Bachirou	Closed door
3 May 2011	Carlton YMCA; Renfrewshire Cup 2010/11 semi final	Cappielow Park, Greenock	4–0	Own Goal; Stewart Kean; Steven McAfee; Declan McDaid	?

=== Irn-Bru Scottish Football League First Division ===
Date	Opponents	Stadium	Result F – A	Events	Attendance	Points	Referee
7 August 2010	Stirling Albion	Cappielow Park, Greenock	0–0	Stuart McCaffrey (yellow card) 58'; Michael Tidser (yellow card) 89'; Carlo Monti (yellow card) 90'	2,375	1	Charlie Richmond
14 August 2010	Dunfermline Athletic	East End Park, Dunfermline	0–2	Michael Tidser (yellow card) 59'; Peter Weatherson (yellow card) 72'	3,113	1	Alan Muir
21 August 2010	Partick Thistle	Cappielow Park, Greenock	2–0	Stewart Kean 18'; Michael Tidser 88'	2,706	4	John McKendrick
28 August 2010	Raith Rovers	Stark's Park, Kirkcaldy	0–1		2,344	4	Bobby Madden
11 September 2010	Cowdenbeath	Cappielow Park, Greenock	1–2	Stewart Kean 59'	1,839	4	Brian Colvin
18 September 2010	Falkirk	Westfield, Grangemouth	1–2	Stewart Kean 79'; Kevin McKinlay (yellow card) 86'	3,988	4	Mike Tumilty
25 September 2010	Ross County	Cappielow Park, Greenock	0–0	Patrick Cregg (yellow card) 42'; Stewart Kean (yellow card) 69'; Michael Tidser (yellow card) 84'	1,632	5	Thomas Robertson
2 October 2010	Dundee	Dens Park, Dundee	1–2	Sean Fitzharris (yellow card) 20'; Peter Weatherson 41'	4,068	5	Euan Norris
16 October 2010	Queen of the South	Cappielow Park, Greenock	2–0	Peter Weatherson 50' (pen.), 73'; Brian Graham (yellow card) 78'	1,777	8	Calum Murray
23 October 2010	Cowdenbeath	Central Park, Cowdenbeath	2–2	Brian Graham 10'; Allan Jenkins 45' (yellow card) 86'	582	9	Stephen Finnie
30 October 2010	Raith Rovers	Cappielow Park, Greenock	0–1		1,858	9	Steve Conroy
6 November 2010	Dunfermline Athletic	Cappielow Park, Greenock	2–1	Brian Graham 24'; Carlo Monti 36' (pen.); Michael Tidser (yellow card) 73'; Darren Young (yellow card) 75'	1,813	12	Mat Northcroft
13 November 2010	Partick Thistle	Firhill Stadium, Glasgow	0–0		2,436	13	Brian Winter
11 December 2010	Dundee	Cappielow Park, Greenock	0–1	Stuart McCaffrey (yellow card) 81'; David MacGregor (yellow card) 86'	1,568	13	Eddie Smith
14 December 2010	Ross County	Victoria Park, Dingwall	2–2	Brian Graham 26'; Allan Jenkins 31'; Michael Tidser (yellow card) 81'	1,759	14	Iain Brines
15 January 2011	Cowdenbeath	Cappielow Park, Greenock	3–0	David O'Brien 33'; Stuart McCaffrey (yellow card) 34'; Allan Jenkins 54'; Grant Evans (yellow card) 55'; Brian Graham 57'	1,375	17	Mike Tumilty
22 January 2011	Raith Rovers	Stark's Park, Kirkcaldy	2–2	Derek Lyle 53', (yellow card) 64'; Peter Weatherson 89'	2,220	18	Craig Thomson
29 January 2011	Ross County	Cappielow Park, Greenock	2–1	Derek Lyle 59', (yellow card) 84'; Allan Jenkins 82'	1,675	21	Charlie Richmond
12 February 2011	Falkirk	Falkirk Stadium, Grangemouth	0–1	Marc Smyth (yellow card) 16'; Allan Jenkins (yellow card) 40'; Carlo Monti (red card) 73'; Michael Tidser (yellow card) 74' (yellow card) 77' (red card); Darren Young (yellow card) 74'	3,636	21	David Somers
15 February 2011	Stirling Albion	Doubletree Dunblane Stadium, Stirling	1–0	Grant Evans (yellow card) 10'; Brian Graham 84'	626	24	John McKendrick
19 February 2011	Queen of the South	Cappielow Park, Greenock	0–4	David MacGregor (yellow card) 69'	1,754	24	Frank McDermott
22 February 2011	Partick Thistle	Cappielow Park, Greenock	1–0	Derek Lyle 15' (pen.); Fouad Bachirou (yellow card) 23'; Kevin McKinlay (yellow card) 90'	1,267	27	Steven Nicholls
26 February 2011	Dundee	Dens Park, Dundee	1–1	Grant Evans (yellow card) 37'; David MacGregor (yellow card) 46'; Stuart McCaffrey (yellow card) 59'; Allan Jenkins (yellow card) 72', (goal) 76'	4,769	28	Collum
1 March 2011	Falkirk	Cappielow Park, Greenock	0–0		1,343	29	Brian Winter
5 March 2011	Dunfermline Athletic	East End Park, Dunfermline	3–1	Derek Lyle 1'; David O'Brien 48'; Marc Smyth (yellow card) 84'; Kevin McKinlay (yellow card) 86'; Peter Weatherson 88'	2,867	32	Calum Murray
16 March 2011	Queen of the South	Palmerston Park, Dumfries	0–2	Peter Weatherson (yellow card) 72'; Sean Fitzharris (red card) 83'	956	32	Steven McLean
19 March 2011	Raith Rovers	Cappielow Park, Greenock	0–0	Brian Graham (yellow card) 56'	1,809	33	Crawford Allan
22 March 2011	Cowdenbeath	Central Park, Cowdenbeath	2–0	Carlo Monti 2' (pen.); Allan Jenkins 60'; Grant Evans (yellow card) 83'	359	36	Iain Brines
26 March 2011	Ross County	Victoria Park, Dingwall	0–2	Brian Graham (yellow card) 39'; Stuart McCaffrey (yellow card) 55'; Grant Evans (yellow card) 86'	2,379	36	Stevie O'Reilly
2 April 2011	Falkirk	Cappielow Park, Greenock	2–2	David O'Brien 9'; Brian Graham 78'	1,965	37	Bobby Madden
5 April 2011	Stirling Albion	Cappielow Park, Greenock	2–0	Ross Forsyth 9' (o.g.); David O'Brien 36'; Derek Lyle (yellow card) 47'; Graeme Holmes (yellow card) 59'	980	40	Eddie Smith
13 April 2011	Queen of the South	Palmerston Park, Dumfries	4–1	Peter Weatherson 3'; Allan Jenkins 29', 90'; Graeme Holmes (yellow card) 50'; Brian Graham 62'	966	43	Anthony Law
16 April 2011	Dundee	Cappielow Park, Greenock	1–3	David O'Brien (yellow card) 36', (goal) 66'	2,069	43	Kevin Clancy
23 April 2011	Partick Thistle	Firhill Stadium, Glasgow	0–2		2,060	43	David Somers
30 April 2011	Dunfermline Athletic	Cappielow Park, Greenock	0–2		4,626	43	Brian Winter
7 May 2011	Stirling Albion	Doubletree Dunblane Stadium, Stirling	2–3	Carlo Monti 28' (pen.); Allan Jenkins (yellow card) 36'; Stuart McCaffrey 90'	701	43	Stephen Finnie

=== Active Nation Scottish Cup ===
Date	Round	Opponents	Stadium	Result F – A	Events	Attendance	Referee
20 November 2010	Round 3	Dumbarton	Strathclyde Homes Stadium, Dumbarton	2–1	Brian Graham 42', 49'; David MacGregor (yellow card) 72' (yellow card) 79' (red card); Marc Smyth (yellow card) 77'	905	Craig Charleston
18 January 2011	Round 4	Airdrie United	Cappielow Park, Greenock	2–2	Marc Smyth (yellow card) 45' (yellow card) 54' (red card); Brian Graham 52'; Stewart Kean 64'; Michael Tidser (yellow card) 85'; Stuart McCaffrey (yellow card) 86'	1,339	Steven McLean
25 January 2011	Round 4 Replay	Airdrie United	New Broomfield, Airdrie	5–2	David O'Brien 14'; Grant Evans (yellow card) 19'; Allan Jenkins 61', 71'; Brian Graham 68', (yellow card) 80'; Kevin McKinlay (yellow card) 76'; Carlo Monti 84' (pen.), (yellow card) 90'	1,033	Steven McLean
5 February 2011	Round 5	Inverness Caledonian Thistle	Tulloch Caledonian Stadium, Inverness	1–5	Kevin McKinlay (yellow card) 40'; Derek Lyle 83'	1,893	Craig Charleston

=== League Cup ===
Date	Round	Opponents	Stadium	Result F – A	Events	Attendance	Referee
31 July 2010	Round 1	Stranraer	Stair Park, Stranraer	7 – 1	Stewart Kean; 27' (yellow card) 39' (goal) 50', 54'; Graeme Holmes 31'; Peter Weatherson 71', 76'; Kevin Kelbie 83'	470	Steven Nicholls
24 August 2010	Round 2	St Johnstone	McDiarmid Park, Perth	0–2		1,530	Crawford Allan

=== Challenge Cup ===
Date	Round	Opponents	Stadium	Result F – A	Events	Attendance	Referee
25 July 2010	Round 1	Dumbarton	Strathclyde Homes Stadium, Dumbarton	0 – 0 PENS: 4 – 3	Michael Tidser (yellow card) 30'	1,301	Stephen Finnie
10 August 2010	Round 2	Ross County	Victoria Park, Dingwall	1–3	Kevin Kelbie 16'	865	Collum

== League table ==
Pos	Team	Pld	W	D	L	GF	GA	GD	Pts	Promotion, qualification or relegation
5	Partick Thistle	36	12	11	13	44	39	+5	47	
6	Dundee	36	19	12	5	54	34	+20	44 (Note: Dundee were docked 25 points for entering administration. The deduction was temporarily lifted pending an appeal by the club, however the appeal failed and the deduction was reinstated.)	
7	Greenock Morton	36	11	10	15	39	43	−4	43	
8	Ross County	36	9	14	13	30	34	−4	41	
9	Cowdenbeath (R)	36	9	8	19	41	72	−31	35	Qualification for the First Division play-offs

Source: SPFL
Rules for classification: 1) points; 2) goal difference; 3) number of goals scored.
(R) Relegated

== Player statistics ==
As of 7 May 2011

=== All competitions ===
Position	Player	Played	Subs	Goal	Sent off (straight red)	Booked
MF	(France) Fouad Bachirou	17	9	0	0	1
MF	(Republic of Ireland) Patrick Cregg (trialist)	1	0	0	0	1
GK	(Scotland) Kevin Cuthbert	11	0	0	0	0
DF	(Scotland) Grant Evans (on loan from Hamilton Accies)	34	0	0	0	6
FW	(Scotland) Sean Fitzharris (on loan from Celtic)	9	6	0	1	1
FW	(Scotland) Brian Graham	20	12	11	0	4
DF	(Scotland) Stewart Greacen	3	1	0	0	0
MF	(Scotland) Graeme Holmes	20	11	1	0	2
MF	(Scotland) Allan Jenkins	38	4	10	0	4
MF	(Scotland) Ryan Kane	1	2	0	0	0
FW	(Scotland) Stewart Kean	26	10	7	0	2
FW	(Scotland) Kevin Kelbie	3	10	2	0	0
FW	(Scotland) Derek Lyle	17	4	5	0	3
DF	(Scotland) David MacGregor	18	1	0	1	4
DF	(Scotland) Eddie Malone (trialist)	1	0	0	0	0
DF	(Scotland) Stuart McCaffrey	41	1	1	0	6
DF	(Scotland) Kevin McKinlay	30	2	0	0	5
MF	(Scotland) Carlo Monti	20	13	4	1	2
MF	(Scotland) David O'Brien	26	9	6	0	1
DF	(Scotland) Nathan Shepherd	1	1	0	0	0
DF	(Northern Ireland) Marc Smyth	38	1	0	1	4
GK	(Scotland) Colin Stewart	33	1	0	0	0
MF	(Scotland) Michael Tidser	41	1	1	1	8
FW	(Cameroon) Jonathan Toto	3	1	0	0	0
FW	(England) Peter Weatherson	21	18	8	0	2
MF	(Scotland) Darren Young	10	4	0	0	2
