= Michael Tidser =

Scottish footballer (born 1990)

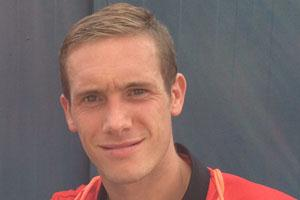

Personal information
- Full name: Michael Tidser
- Date of birth: 15 January 1990 (age 36)
- Place of birth: Glasgow, Scotland
- Height: 1.82 m (6 ft 0 in)
- Position: Midfielder

Youth career
- 2005–2009: Celtic

Senior career*
Years	Team	Apps	(Gls)
2009–2010	Östersunds	0	(0)
2010–2013	Greenock Morton	103	(9)
2013–2015	Rotherham United	11	(0)
2014	→ Ross County (loan)	16	(0)
2014–2015	→ Oldham Athletic (loan)	5	(0)
2015–2019	Greenock Morton	102	(9)
2019–2020	Falkirk	9	(0)
2020–2025	Kelty Hearts	115	(6)

International career
2007	Scotland U18	3	(1)
2008	Scotland U19	3	(0)

Managerial career
- 2023–2025: Kelty Hearts
- 2025: Dunfermline Athletic
- 2026–: Kelty Hearts
- * Club domestic league appearances and goals as of 17 January 2025

Michael Tidser (born 15 January 1990) is a Scottish former footballer,currently the manager of Scottish League Two club Kelty Hearts.

Tidser began his career with Celtic (featuring for Scotland at under-19 international level during his time there), before spending a short time in Sweden with Östersunds FK. He returned to Scotland for three seasons at Greenock Morton, making over 100 appearances. He next moved to English club Rotherham United. After spells on loan with Ross County and Oldham Athletic, Tidser returned to Morton in 2015 and remained until 2019, following which he had a short spell with Falkirk. In 2020 he signed for Kelty Hearts, being part of the team which gained two successive promotions, and became their player-manager in 2023. He joined Dunfermline Athletic in January 2025 but was sacked two months later.

== Playing career ==
Born in Glasgow, Tidser started his career with Celtic and was captain of the Under-19s before being released. He then signed a short-term contract with Swedish side Östersunds FK.

=== Morton ===
After his contract expired with Östersunds, he signed an 18-month deal with Greenock Morton.

Tidser made an impressive start for the club, winning the Young Player of the Month for March 2010. He was watched by Rangers coach Kenny McDowall.

In the 2010–11 season, Tidser scored his first goal for the club in a 2–0 win over Partick Thistle. His impressive performances drew interest from Scottish Premier League's Kilmarnock and League One side Huddersfield Town, but no offers were made. On 12 February 2011, Tidser was sent off after a second bookable offence in a 1–0 loss against Falkirk; after the match, manager Allan Moore said he was disappointed with Tidser's action. In April 2011, Tidser signed a new three-year deal with Morton.

In 2011–12, Tidser started well, scoring his first goal of the season before providing an assist for Peter MacDonald to score the winning goal in a 2–1 win over Livingston on 13 August 2011. A week later, on 23 August 2011, he scored again and set up a goal for MacDonald in the second round of the Scottish League Cup, in a 4–3 loss to St Mirren. However, his early season was overshadowed with a knee problem. Following an operation, it was announced that he would be out for two months and expected to come back in December. Soon in mid-November, Tidser resumed training. Upon recovering from injury, Tidser spoke to the Greenock Telegraph, describing his absence through injury as "torture". In January 2012, after Stuart McCaffrey was ruled out for the season, Tidser was made Morton's team captain just after his 22nd birthday. On 20 March 2012, he scored his second goal of the season in a 2–0 win over Falkirk.

In 2012–13, Tidser had a good season with the club as they battled with Partick Thistle for promotion to the Scottish Premier League (Morton eventually finished second). On 6 October 2012 Tidser provided assists for Kevin Rutkiewicz and Mark McLaughlin in a 3–1 win over Partick. It wasn't until 29 December 2012 when Tidser scored his first goals of the season, with a brace in a 4–2 win over Dunfermline Athletic. That was followed up on 26 January 2013 when he scored in a 1–0 win over Raith Rovers. His next goal came on 23 February 2013 when he again scored against Dunfermline, with the same result as the previous meeting. On 16 March 2013, Tidser scored his final goal of the season in a 3–0 win over Dumbarton. During the season he also made several assists, and also scored five times in the Scottish Cup, including doubles against Albion Rovers and Turriff United. However, he suffered a groin injury that ruled him out for the rest of the season. He was nominated for the 2012–13 First Division Player of the Year, and won the supporters' club awards. In June 2013, Tidser was the subject of a £50k bid from Rotherham United, which was rejected in initially by Morton chairman Douglas Rae. A further bid five days later was accepted.

=== Rotherham United ===
Tidser officially signed for Rotherham United on 3 July 2013. The following week, on 9 July 2013, Tidser played against his former club Morton; when brought on as a late substitute, he was given a standing ovation by Morton's fans.

After being unused in the first two matches of the 2013–14 season, Tidser made his debut for Rotherham as a late substitute in a 2–1 win over Crawley Town. Most of his subsequent appearances were also from the bench.

On 3 January 2014, Tidser joined Ross County on loan until the end of the 2013–14 season in order to help the club retain their Scottish Premiership status. He made his debut the next day, coming on as a substitute in the second half in a 1–0 win over St Johnstone. Tidser's playing time increased, and he provided assists against Hibernian on 15 February and St Mirren on 22 February. However, a knee injury put him out for the remainder of the season. Tidser made 16 appearances for Ross County and returned to his parent club at the end of the season.

After making his return to Rotherham, Tidser made his first appearance for the club in a year, in a 1–0 win over Fleetwood Town in the first round of the League Cup. He made two more appearances for the club, against Watford in the league and another League Cup appearance against Swansea City. On 1 September 2014, in the last hour of Deadline Day, Tidser signed for Oldham Athletic on loan until January 2015. Tidser made his Oldham debut in the second round of Football League Trophy, which they beat Barnsley 4–2 on penalty shoot-out, but struggled to secure a place in the first team and made seven appearances in all competitions.

He was released in January 2015 after two years at Rotherham United, and was quickly on the radar of former club Morton.

=== Return to Morton ===
In January 2015, Tidser returned to Morton on a two-and-a-half-year deal. He was unable, however, to play until the following season due to FIFA transfer regulations having already played for two clubs in 2014–15. Because of this, he played in the club's reserve matches to maintain his fitness throughout the season.

His 2015–16 season with Morton was limited to very few appearances before finally being ruled out all together in March after suffering a suspected hernia. In June 2017, Tidser signed a two-year extension with the club.

=== Falkirk ===
Tidser signed for Falkirk on 10 June 2019 and played for the club during the first half of the 2019–20 season.

=== Kelty Hearts ===
Kelty Hearts of the Lowland Football League signed Tidser as a player in February 2020, though the COVID-19 pandemic soon disputed his early time there, with the Fife club declared champions based on points accumulated before the season was curtailed, but denied the chance of promotion. A year later, he scored the clinching goal against Brechin City in the 2021 SPFL pyramid playoffs against to send Kelty into the professional divisions for the first time in their history. They secured a second successive promotion by winning the 2021–22 Scottish League Two title.

In April 2023, Kelty announced that Tidser would become their new player-manager. While he led the club, they maintained their place in Scottish League One and were well on course to do so again in 2024–25.

=== International career ===
Tidser made three appearances for both the Scotland under-18 and under-19 sides, scoring once for the under-18's against Turkey.

== Managerial career ==
=== Dunfermline Athletic ===
In January 2025, Scottish Championship side Dunfermline Athletic appointed Tidser as their new manager on a two-and-a-half year deal. Kelty Hearts assistant manager Kevin McDonald also made the move between the Fife clubs. Tidser was sacked on 17 March 2025 after 11 games in charge, only three of which had victories.

== Career statistics ==
As of match played 17 January 2025

Appearances and goals by club, season and competition
Club	Season	League			National Cup		League Cup		Other		Total	
Club	Season	Division	Apps	Goals	Apps	Goals	Apps	Goals	Apps	Goals	Apps	Goals
Greenock Morton	2009–10	Scottish First Division	13	0	0	0	0	0	0	0	13	0
Greenock Morton	2010–11	Scottish First Division	34	1	3	0	1	0	0	0	38	1
Greenock Morton	2011–12	Scottish First Division	25	2	2	0	2	1	1 (Note: Appearances in the Scottish Challenge Cup)	0	30	3
Greenock Morton	2012–13	Scottish First Division	31	6	3	3	2	1	1	1	37	11
Greenock Morton	Total		103	9	8	3	5	2	2	1	118	15
Rotherham United	2013–14	League One	10	0	2	0	2	0	2 (Note: Appearances in the Football League Trophy)	0	16	0
Rotherham United	2014–15	Championship	1	0	0	0	2	0	–		3	0
Rotherham United	Total		11	0	2	0	4	0	2	0	19	0
Ross County (loan)	2013–14	Scottish Premiership	16	0	0	0	0	0	—		16	0
Oldham Athletic (loan)	2014–15	League One	5	0	0	0	—		2	0	7	0
Greenock Morton	2015–16	Scottish Championship	16	0	1	0	2	1	0	0	19	1
Greenock Morton	2016–17	Scottish Championship	28	1	2	2	5	0	3 (Note: One appearance in the Scottish Challenge Cup and two in the Premiership play-offs)	0	38	3
Greenock Morton	2017–18	Scottish Championship	28	3	3	0	4	0	1	0	36	3
Greenock Morton	2018–19	Scottish Championship	30	5	3	0	4	3	0	0	37	8
Greenock Morton	Total		102	9	9	2	15	4	4	0	130	15
Falkirk	2019–20	Scottish League One	9	0	1	0	4	0	0	0	14	0
Kelty Hearts	2020–21	Lowland League	12 (Note: , league stats not verified in source.)	0	1	0	4	1	4 (Note: Two appearances in the Pyramid Playoffs Semi Final and two in the Scottish League Two Playoffs.)	1	21	2
Kelty Hearts	2021–22	Scottish League Two	33	2	5	0	4	0	1	1	43	3
Kelty Hearts	2022–23	Scottish League One	31	1	1	0	4	0	4	0	40	1
Kelty Hearts	2023–24	Scottish League One	29	3	1	0	4	0	0	0	34	3
Kelty Hearts	2024-25	Scottish League One	10	0	0	0	0	0	1	0	11	0
Kelty Hearts	Kelty Hearts Total		115	6	8	0	16	1	10	2	149	9
Career total			361	24	28	5	44	7	20	3	453	39

=== Managerial record ===
As of match played 14 November 2026

Team	From	To	Record				
Team	From	To	G	W	D	L	Win %
Kelty Hearts	17 May 2023	16 January 2025	71	26	16	29	36.62
Dunfermline Athletic	17 January 2025	17 March 2025	11	3	2	6	27.27
Kelty Hearts	19 September 2026	Present	11	5	0	6	45.45
Total			93	34	18	41	36.56

== Honours ==
=== Club ===
Kelty Hearts

- Lowland League: 2019–20, 2020–21
- Scottish League Two: 2021–22

=== Individual ===
Greenock Morton

- SFL Young Player of the Month – March 2010
- First Division Player of the Year nominee – 2012–13
- First Division Team of the Year – 2012–13
