= Celtic academy =

The term Celtic Academy may refer to:

- Lennoxtown training centre, a facility operated by Celtic, a Scottish football club
- Celtic F.C. Under-20s and Academy, the subsidiary teams operated by that club
