= Kevin Kelbie =

Scottish footballer (born 1985)

Personal information
- Date of birth: 24 February 1985 (age 41)
- Place of birth: Stirling, Scotland
- Position: Striker

Youth career
- Celtic
- Rangers

Senior career*
Years	Team	Apps	(Gls)
2002–2004	Alloa Athletic	8	(0)
2004–2005	Northern Oklahoma College		
2005	Glentoran	0	(0)
2005–2010	Ballymena United	136	(56)
2010–2011	Greenock Morton	8	(0)
2011–2012	Glenavon	17	(1)
2012	Stirling Albion	14	(2)
2012–2014	Camelon Juniors		
2014–2017	Linlithgow Rose		
2017–2018	East Stirlingshire		
- * Club domestic league appearances and goals

Kevin Kelbie (born 24 February 1985) is a Scottish former footballer.

He has previously played in the Scottish Football League for Greenock Morton and Stirling Albion.

He also had spells in Northern Ireland with Glentoran, Ballymena United and Glenavon.

== Career ==
=== Scotland ===
Kelbie started his youth career at Celtic, before moving to rivals Rangers in a rare move between the Glasgow rivals. He studied for an HND in Sports Coaching at Falkirk College from 2001 – 2003. In his second year at the college, he was part of the 5-a-side team who won the college championship versus Stevie Grainger's team in the final. He played his first senior games at Clackmannanshire side Alloa Athletic, before heading to the United States for a sporting scholarship at Northern Oklahoma College.

=== Northern Ireland ===
On his return to the United Kingdom, Kelbie signed with Northern Irish side Glentoran on a loan deal after impressing in a trial. He was released by the Glens without making an appearance and manager Tommy Wright moved to sign him for fellow Northern Irish side Ballymena United. Kelbie stayed at Ballymena for five seasons, with the club rejecting a transfer bid from league champions Linfield in 2008.

=== Back to Scotland with Greenock Morton ===
From Ballymena, Kelbie returned to Scotland to join Greenock Morton. At Cappielow, he joined up with Allan Moore, who had been training him at Stirling Albion when he was in Scotland and flying over at the weekend for games in Northern Ireland. Kelbie made his début for Morton against nearby Dumbarton in the Scottish Challenge Cup on 24 July 2010, and scored his first goal at Victoria Park, Dingwall in a 1–3 defeat by Ross County, in the following.

=== Return to Northern Ireland ===
He joined Glenavon on a two-year contract at the end of May 2011. He left the club by mutual consent in January 2012.

=== Back to Scotland ===
Kelbie joined Stirling Albion after being released from Glenavon. He left the club in May 2012 and signed for Camelon Juniors two months later. A prolific spell saw him top scorer in the 2013–14 Scottish Junior Cup and Kelbie moved on to Linilthgow Rose in the summer of 2014.

== See also ==
- Greenock Morton F.C. season 2010–11 | 2011–12
