= David O'Brien (footballer) =

Scottish footballer

Personal information
- Date of birth: 24 January 1984 (age 42)
- Place of birth: Stirling, Scotland
- Position: Midfielder

Team information
- Current team: Stirling University (coach)

Youth career
- Denny Amateurs

Senior career*
| Years | Team | Apps | (Gls) |
| 2001–2007 | Stirling Albion | 166 | (37) |
| 2007–2009 | Dundee | 42 | (2) |
| 2009 | Ayr United | 0 | (0) |
| 2009–2010 | Stirling Albion | 36 | (6) |
| 2010–2014 | Greenock Morton | 101 | (18) |
| 2016–2017 | Camelon Juniors | | |
| 2017– | Stirling University | | |
- * Club domestic league appearances and goals

David O'Brien (born 24 January 1984) is a Scottish former professional footballer who played as a left-sided midfielder, for home-town side Stirling University now acts as a coach. He has also played for Stirling Albion, Dundee and Ayr United.

== Career ==
O'Brien started his career with Stirling Albion in 2001, after joining from amateur side Denny Amateurs, and helped them win the Second Division play-off final against Airdrie United in 2007. In January 2007, he signed a pre-contract agreement with Dundee, moving to Tayside in May 2007. At the end of the 2007–08 season, he signed a one-year contract extension with the Dens Park side. He failed to have his contract renewed when it expired in 2009.

On 15 June 2009, Ayr United announced that they had signed O'Brien. He left the Honest Men on 3 August 2009, after not being selected to play against his old club Stirling Albion on 1 August 2009. O'Brien met with the manager Brian Reid, and after a short discussion he left the club.

He rejoined his home-town team, Stirling Albion, on 6 August 2009.

After his contract expired at Stirling, he joined manager Allan Moore at new club Greenock Morton. O'Brien signed on for another season in May 2012. He again signed a one-year deal in May 2013. He left Morton in the summer of 2014 after failing to recover from an injury sustained at Celtic Park.

In August 2016, he signed for Junior side Camelon Juniors where he stayed for a season before signing for Stirling University.

== Honours ==
Stirling Albion

- Scottish Football League Second Division
  - Winners 2009–10

== See also ==
- Greenock Morton F.C. season 2010–11 | 2011–12 | 2012–13 | 2013–14
