= Carlo Monti (footballer) =

Scottish footballer

Personal information
- Full name: Carlo Gordon Monti
- Date of birth: 10 July 1990 (age 36)
- Place of birth: Glasgow, Scotland
- Height: 5 ft 9 in (1.75 m)
- Positions: Midfielder; forward

Team information
- Current team: Kilwinning Rangers

Youth career
- 1999–2009: Celtic

Senior career*
Years	Team	Apps	(Gls)
2009–2011	Greenock Morton	49	(7)
2011	Kings Park Rangers AFC	?	(?)
2011	Drumchapel United AFC	?	(?)
2011	Arbroath (trial)	2	(0)
2012–2013	Pollok	35	(31)
2013–2014	Dundee	14	(1)
2014	Pollok	0	(0)
2014–2015	Żebbuġ Rangers	27	(9)
2015–2016	Qormi	14	(0)
2016	Pollok	18	(6)
2016–2022	Kilwinning Rangers	?	(37)
2022	Cumnock Juniors	1	(0)
2022–2025	Beith Juniors	126	(67)
2025-2026	Pollok	13	(2)
2026-	Kilwinning Rangers	13	(5)

International career^{‡}
- Scotland U16
- Scotland U17
2007	Scotland U18	3	(0)
- * Club domestic league appearances and goals as of 20:21, 14 November 2026 (UTC) ‡ National team caps and goals as of 14:09, 10 September 2026 (UTC)

Carlo Gordon Monti (born 10 July 1990) is a Scottish professional footballer, who plays for Kilwinning Rangers in the Lowland Football League. He has previously played at Scottish Championship level for Greenock Morton and Dundee.

== Club career ==
Monti started his career with Celtic, signing as a nine-year-old and working his way through the ranks to the Celtic first team squad where he was earmarked as an attacking wing-back by the late Tommy Burns. He left the club at 18 to sign for Greenock Morton in April 2009.

Monti scored the first goal of his senior career with a 20-yard drive in the 2–1 defeat away at Dunfermline. He also scored the winning goal as Morton avoided relegation, at the same time relegating Ayr United, on 1 May 2010. Monti rejected a new contract offer at Morton, and after a potential move to Dundee fell through, he was left without a club.

After leaving Morton, Monti left the professional game and played local amateur football in Glasgow. While playing for Drumchapel United, he was convinced by new Pollok manager John Richardson to sign for the Junior side in March 2012. Monti scored 16 goals in 15 games as Pollok preserved their Premier Division status and he extended his contract with the Glasgow side for another season. In his final game for Pollok he scored two and set-up one in a 3–0 over Ashfield in the Central League Cup final, as well as winning man of the match.

On 10 July 2013, Monti was signed by Dundee manager John Brown after a successful trial and scored his first competitive goal for the club against Alloa Athletic in the Scottish Challenge Cup. Monti was released by recently appointed Dundee manager Paul Hartley in April 2014 after making nineteen appearances for the club.

After briefly rejoining Pollok, Monti moved to Maltese club Żebbuġ Rangers in August 2014. He moved on in the summer of 2015 to fellow Maltese club Qormi but was released in December.

After returning from Malta, Monti joined Pollok for a third time in January 2016 and was in Lok's losing Scottish Junior Cup final side against Beith Juniors the following May. In September 2016, Monti was placed on the transfer list by Pollok and he signed for Kilwinning Rangers in October.

In September 2021, Kilwinning Rangers accepted a transfer request from Monti, before accepting bids from Lowland Football League side Broomhill and ambitious West of Scotland Conference outfit Drumchapel United. In February 2022, Monti moved to Cumnock Juniors.

More than four years later, Monti returned to Buffs Park to re-sign with Kilwinning Rangers.

== International career ==
Monti has played for the Scotland national side at all youth levels from under-16s to under-18s, playing in the under 17s in Germany alongside Hearts starlet Gary Glen and against Thomas Müller. He also made three starting appearances for Ross Mathie's under-18 side, in defeats to France, Turkey and a draw with the United States.

== Honours ==
=== Pollok ===
- Central League Cup: Winner 2012–13
- Scottish Junior Cup: Runner-Up 2015–16

=== Dundee ===
- Scottish Championship: Winner 2013–14

=== Kilwinning Rangers ===
- Eglinton Cup: Winner 2021-22

=== Beith Juniors ===
- West of Scotland Football League Premier Division: Winner 2022-23, 2023-24

== See also ==
- Greenock Morton F.C. season 2008-09 | 2009–10 | 2010–11
