= Ryan Kane =

Scottish footballer

Ryan Kane (footballer)
Personal information
- Full name: Ryan Kane
- Date of birth: 26 November 1991 (age 34)
- Place of birth: Glasgow, Scotland
- Position: Midfielder

Team information
- Current team: Clyde

Youth career
- –2009: Greenock Morton

Senior career*
Years	Team	Apps	(Gls)
2009–2011	Greenock Morton	6	(0)
2010	→ Glenafton Athletic (loan)	4	(2)
2011–2012	Clyde	26	(0)
- * Club domestic league appearances and goals as of 19:04, 28 April 2012 (UTC)

Ryan Kane (born 26 November 1991 in Glasgow) was a Scottish footballer who last played for Clyde in the Scottish Third Division. He began his career with Scottish First Division side Greenock Morton.

He went on loan to Glenafton Athletic in 2010, with Nathan Shepherd.

== Career ==
Kane made his début for Greenock Morton against Inverness Caledonian Thistle on 31 October 2009.

Kane, along with fellow youngster Nathan Shepherd was given a years extension in July 2010. In October, the pair signed for Glenafton Athletic on loan.

After his release from Morton, Kane impressed as a trialist for Clyde in four pre-season friendly matches, and signed for the club in July 2011. His first season with Clyde started with a 1–0 win against Montrose at Broadwood.

== See also ==
- Greenock Morton F.C. season 2009-10 | 2010–11
