= Grant Evans (footballer) =

Scottish footballer

Personal information
- Date of birth: 3 January 1990 (age 36)
- Place of birth: Glasgow, Scotland
- Position: Defender

Team information
- Current team: Albion Rovers (on loan from Pollok)

Youth career
- Hamilton Academical

Senior career*
Years	Team	Apps	(Gls)
2007–2011	Hamilton Academical	13	(0)
2008	→ Dumbarton (loan)	9	(0)
2010–2011	→ Greenock Morton (loan)	27	(0)
2011–2012	Greenock Morton	33	(0)
2012–2013	Airdrie United	18	(0)
2013–2014	Airdrieonians	13	(0)
2014–2016	Irvine Meadow	?	(?)
2016–2022	Pollok	69	(3)
2021	→ Albion Rovers (loan)	0	(0)
- * Club domestic league appearances and goals as of 17:57, 10 January 2021 (UTC)

Grant Evans (born 3 January 1990) is a Scottish professional footballer, who plays for Albion Rovers, on loan from Pollok. He has previously played in the Scottish Premier League for Hamilton Academical.

== Career ==
He made his début for Hamilton Academical in August 2007 against Ayr United in the Scottish League Challenge Cup.

He went on loan to Scottish Third Division side Dumbarton, in January 2008, until the end of the season. He made his debut for Dumbarton against St Mirren in the Scottish Cup that same month.

In July 2010, Evans was loaned to Greenock Morton until January 2011.

After his loan expired in May 2010, the move was made permanent. He was released from the club in May 2012, signing for Airdrie United the following month.

Evans left Airdrieonians in May 2014, and signed for Junior side Irvine Meadow the following month. After two seasons at Meadow Park, Evans joined Pollok in August 2016.

In January 2021, Evans returned to the SPFL coming in on loan for Scottish League Two side Albion Rovers alongside fellow Pollok player Mark Sideserf.

== See also ==
- Greenock Morton F.C. season 2010–11 | 2011–12
