= Sean Fitzharris =

Scottish footballer

Personal information
- Date of birth: 13 October 1991 (age 35)
- Place of birth: Greenock, Scotland
- Positions: Winger; forward

Team information
- Current team: East Kilbride

Youth career
- 2004–2007: Rangers
- 2007–2010: Celtic

Senior career*
Years	Team	Apps	(Gls)
2010–2011	Celtic	0	(0)
2010–2011	→ Greenock Morton (loan)	15	(0)
2011–2012	Greenock Morton	10	(0)
2012	Stenhousemuir (trial)	3	(0)
2012–2014	Clyde	21	(0)
2013–2014	→ East Kilbride (loan)		
2014–	East Kilbride		

International career^{‡}
2007–2008	Scotland U17	7	(3)
- * Club domestic league appearances and goals as of 23:53, 28 October 2013 (UTC) ‡ National team caps and goals as of 25 May 2011

Sean Fitzharris (born 13 October 1991) is a Scottish footballer who plays for East Kilbride in the Lowland Football League. Fitzharris came through the youth academies of both halves of the Old Firm, Rangers and Celtic.

== Club career ==
=== Rangers ===
Fitzharris started his youth career at Rangers and played for their under-13, under-14 and under-15 teams before moving to Celtic, where he played for their under-17 and under-19 age groups.

=== Celtic ===
Fitzharris started his career with Celtic, before signing for Greenock Morton on loan after scoring a double against them in a training game at the Lennoxtown training centre. Fitzharris has featured in Celtic's first team, taking part as a substitute in a friendly victory over Chris Sutton's Lincoln City to help lift the John Reames Memorial Trophy. Fitzharris was a member of the under-19s League and Cup double winning team in season 2009–10 scoring the winning goal in the cup final against Rangers at Hampden Park. He was released at the end of the 2010–11 season.

=== Morton ===
Fitzharris signed on loan on 10 September 2010, going straight into the starting line-up the following day in a home defeat against Cowdenbeath. After returning to Celtic at the end of 2010, Fitzharris was signed on a new loan deal on 7 January 2011 until the end of the season. After his release from Celtic, Fitzharris returned to Cappielow to sign a one-year contract with Morton. He was released by Morton in January 2012.

=== Clyde ===
After a long spell without a club, Fitzharris signed for Clyde in August 2012 on a one-year deal. Fitzharris went on to agree a contract extension with Clyde at the beginning of May 2013 for a further one year. It was announced on 29 October 2013 that Fitzharris had agreed to a short-term loan deal with non-league side East Kilbride until the end of December 2013. On 12 January 2014, Fitzharris left Clyde and signed for East Kilbride on a permanent deal.

== International career ==
Fitzharris was a regular in Ross Mathie's Scotland U17 squad, scoring three goals in seven appearances.

== Personal life ==
Fitzharris was raised in Inverkip and attended St Columba's High School in Gourock.
