= Allan Jenkins (footballer) =

Scottish footballer

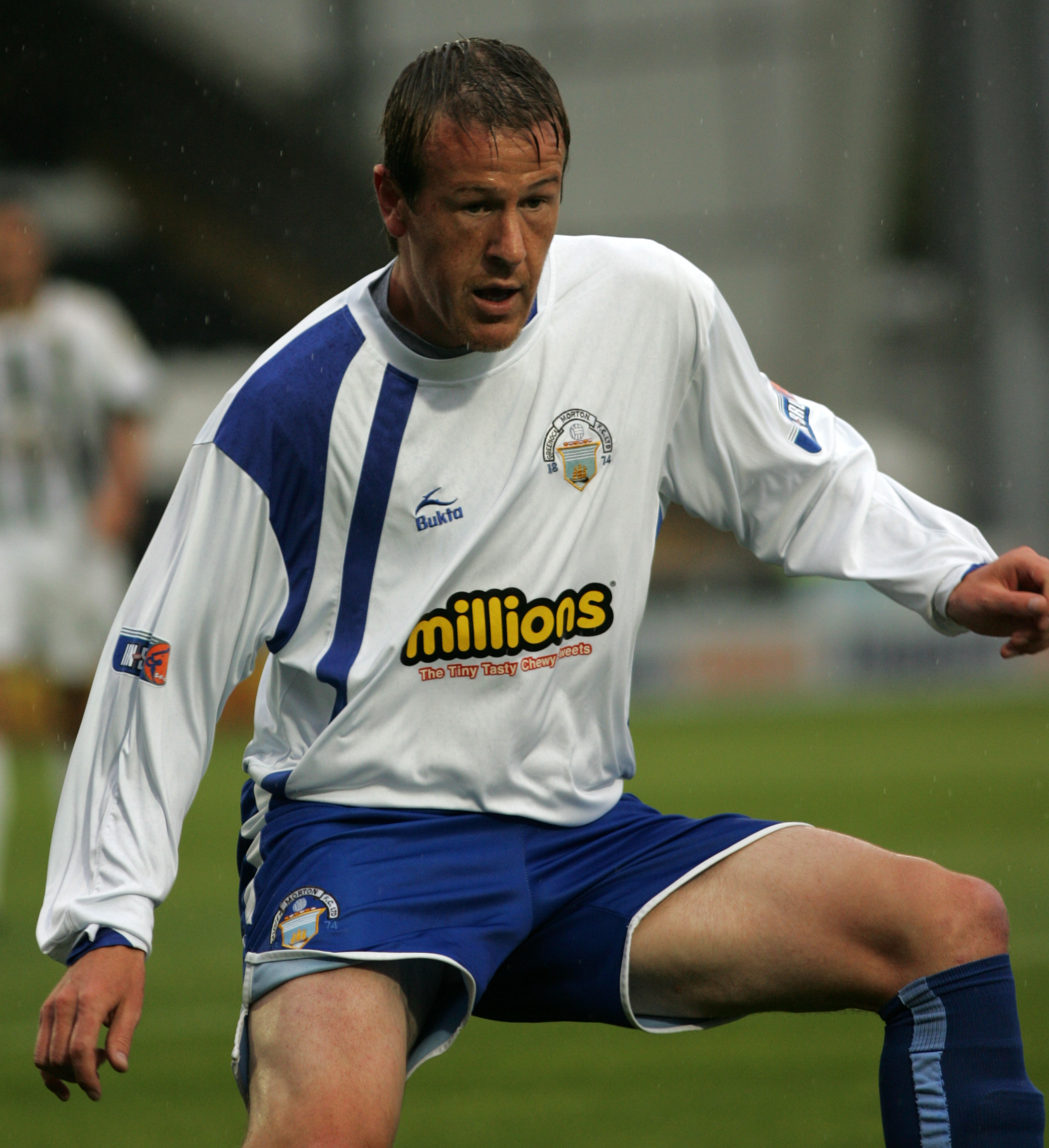

Personal information
- Full name: Allan David Jenkins
- Date of birth: 7 October 1981 (age 45)
- Place of birth: Stranraer, Scotland
- Position: Midfielder

Youth career
- Ayr Boswell

Senior career*
Years	Team	Apps	(Gls)
1998–2006	Stranraer	208	(25)
2006–2008	Gretna	80	(8)
2008–2011	Greenock Morton	97	(13)
2011–2017	Ballymena United	254	(58)
2017	Hurlford United		
2018	Darvel		
2018–2019	Dalbeattie Star		
- * Club domestic league appearances and goals

Allan Jenkins (born 7 October 1981) is a Scottish former professional footballer who last played for Dalbeattie Star.

Jenkins started his career at home town club Stranraer where he played for eight years, he spent a two-year spell at the now defunct "big spenders" Gretna in the SPL before ending his time in Scotland with Greenock Morton. He is perhaps best known for his time at Ballymena United.

At all his senior clubs, Jenkins has been the captain on at least one occasion.

== Career ==
=== Early years ===
As a schoolboy Jenkins represented Dumfries and Galloway region playing with the likes of Kevin Kyle.

=== Stranraer ===
Jenkins began his senior career with local club Stranraer in 1998 and made over 200 appearances for the club. Was made club captain under Neil Watt and skippered the side to the third division championship in 2003–04. In May 2005 he then scored the goal against Greenock Morton which secured a second successive promotion. This put Stranraer into the second tier of Scottish football for the first time since the late 1990s. With Jenkins scoring in the 2 January win against Queen of the South, Stranraer were 12 points clear of their South West rivals in the battle to stay in the division. On 12 January 2006 Jenkins was signed by Gretna for an undisclosed fee. Stranraer's form collapsed as they collected only one further league win all season. They were condemned to an ultimately unsuccessful play-off against Partick Thistle and relegation back to the third flight after only one season.

=== Gretna ===
Jenkins was cup tied for Gretna's run to the 2006 Scottish Cup final. He helped Gretna to Scottish Premier League promotion in season 2006–07, scoring four league goals. In season 2007–08 he scored the winning goal in the club's first ever Premier League win, 3–2 against Dundee United in September 2007.

=== Greenock Morton ===
Jenkins signed for Greenock Morton on 31 January 2008. The move re-united Jenkins with Davie Irons, after Irons was appointed manager shortly after.

=== Ballymena United ===
Turning down a new deal on substantially less money, Jenkins crossed the Irish Sea to sign with part-timers Ballymena United.

In his time at the club he made 254 appearances and was worshipped by the club's supporters for his passion and skill.

In May 2014, he scored Ballymena's only goal in the 2013–14 Irish Cup final against Glenavon. His goal was an equaliser to level the game at 1–1, but in their first Irish Cup final in 25 years, Ballymena were ultimately defeated 2–1.

Jenkins won the 2012 County Antrim Shield with Ballymena, the club's first major trophy win since 1989 beating Linfield 4–3 on penalties. He has since won this competition for a second time with Ballymena (2015–16) in a 3–2 victory over Linfield.

In 2017 Allan scored the first goal in the club's League Cup final victory over Carrick Rangers, Ballymena ultimately won 2–0. In the same season (2016–17) he helped the club achieve UEFA Europa League qualification for the first time ever.

On 24 May 2017 Jenkins left Ballymena United and returned to his homeland of Scotland where he went Junior with Hurlford United.

== Personal life ==
Jenkins became a father to his new daughter Macie on 11 November 2008. To honour the event, manager at the time, Davie Irons made him captain in the match against Dunfermline. In early 2016 Jenkins became a father to his new daughter Alli on 2 February 2016.
