= Stewart Kean =

Scottish footballer

Personal information
- Full name: Stewart Kean
- Date of birth: 4 March 1983 (age 43)
- Place of birth: Irvine, Scotland
- Position: Striker

Team information
- Current team: Drongan United

Youth career
- –2000: Craigmark Burntonians

Senior career*
Years	Team	Apps	(Gls)
2000–2004	Ayr United	93	(29)
2004–2008	St Mirren	113	(23)
2008–2010	Queen of the South	60	(10)
2010–2011	Greenock Morton	28	(3)
2011–2013	Stenhousemuir	65	(18)
2013–2019	Hurlford United	181	(135)
- * Club domestic league appearances and goals as of 5 January 2019

Stewart Kean (born 4 March 1983) is a Scottish former professional footballer. Kean played professionally for Ayr United, St Mirren, Queen of the South, Greenock Morton and Stenhousemuir in the Scottish Professional Football League. Kean also played for Craigmark Burntonians and Hurlford United in the Scottish Junior Football Association, West Region

== Career ==
Kean signed for Ayr United at the start of the 2001–02 season at the start of his senior football career. Kean had 93 league appearances and scored 29 league goals for the Honest Men. Kean then signed for St Mirren in December 2004 for £20,000 and stayed with the club until the end of the 2007–08 season. Kean had 113 league appearances and scored 23 league goals for the Paisley club, and also played as St Mirren won the 2005 Scottish Challenge Cup Final against Hamilton Academical.

Kean then signed for Dumfries club Queen of the South in May 2008 on a pre-contract agreement. Kean was released by the Doonhamers at the end of the 2009–10 season, having had 60 league appearances and scoring 10 league goals for the club.

After his contract at Palmerston Park expired in May 2010, Kean signed for Greenock Morton at the start of the 2010–11 season. Kean was released by Greenock Morton at the end of the 2010–11 season.

Towards the end of June 2011, Kean signed for Second Division club Stenhousemuir. Kean then signed for Junior club Hurlford United in June 2013.

== See also ==
- Greenock Morton F.C. season 2010–11
