= Fouad Bachirou =

Footballer (born 1990)

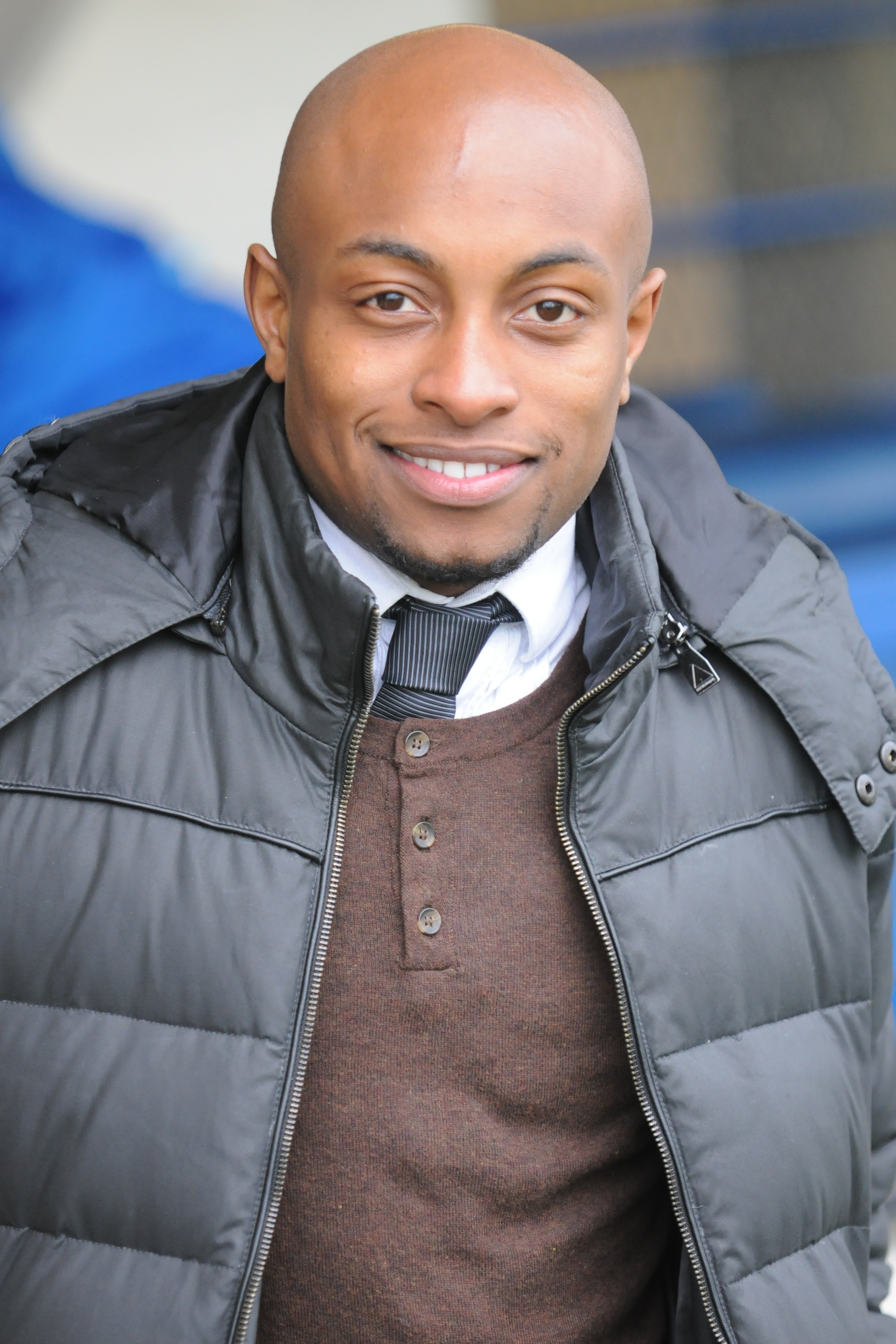
- Bachirou in 2012

Personal information
- Date of birth: 15 April 1990 (age 36)
- Place of birth: Valence, France
- Height: 1.67 m (5 ft 6 in)
- Position: Midfielder

Team information
- Current team: Matlock Town

Youth career
- –2006: USA Clichy
- 2006–2008: Paris Saint-Germain

Senior career*
Years	Team	Apps	(Gls)
2008–2010	Paris Saint-Germain B	22	(1)
2010–2014	Greenock Morton	117	(2)
2014–2017	Östersunds FK	86	(2)
2018–2020	Malmö FF	58	(0)
2020–2021	Nottingham Forest	1	(0)
2021–2024	Omonia	65	(0)
2024–	Matlock Town	28	(0)

International career
2014–2023	Comoros	41	(0)
- * Club domestic league appearances and goals as of 17 December 2025

Fouad "Fred" Bachirou (born 15 April 1990) is a professional footballer who plays as a midfielder for Northern Premier League Division One East club Matlock Town.

He previously played for the Paris Saint-Germain reserves, Greenock Morton in Scotland, Swedish sides Östersund and Malmö FF, and EFL Championship side Nottingham Forest. Born in France, he played for the Comoros national team, making 41 appearances from 2014 to 2023.

== Career ==
=== Paris Saint-Germain ===
Born in Valence, Bachirou started his career in the youth teams at local side Football Club de la Place de Clichy, before winning a move to Ligue 1 giants Paris Saint-Germain, where he played in the CFA side in the French third division – scoring once against UJA Maccabi Paris Métropole.

=== Greenock Morton ===
Bachirou transferred to Greenock Morton in July 2010, after a trial spell at the club. He made his competitive debut for Greenock Morton in a Scottish Challenge Cup match against Dumbarton on 25 July 2010. In June 2011, Bachirou signed a new one-year contract at Morton. After over 50 appearances for the club, Bachirou scored his first goal in a 2–2 draw with Queen of the South on 7 April 2012. Bachirou stated he would not be seeking a new contract with the club in May 2012. On 17 August 2012, Bachirou made a U-turn and re-signed for the club, after rejecting a move to league rivals Hamilton Accies.

In September 2013, he signed a contract extension until summer 2015.

=== Östersunds FK ===
Bachirou made a surprise move to Östersunds FK in August 2014. He made his debut from the bench away to promoted club Husqvarna FF. During his time at Östersund they managed to get a promotion to Allsvenskan, win the Swedish Cup and qualify for the 2017–18 UEFA Europa League.

=== Malmö FF ===
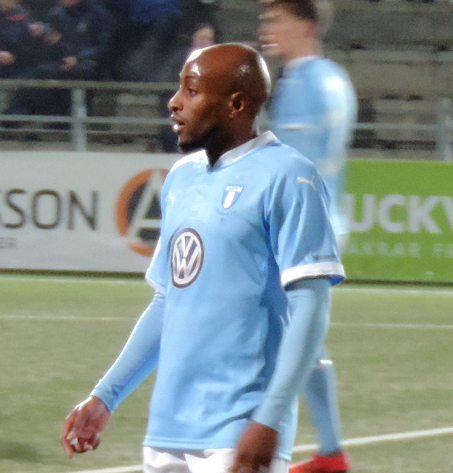
Bachirou playing for Malmö FF in 2018.

On 9 January 2018, Swedish champions Malmö FF confirmed the transfer of Bachirou for an estimated fee of around 7 million SEK (roughly £600,000).

=== Nottingham Forest ===
On 26 August 2020, Bachirou joined EFL Championship side Nottingham Forest for an undisclosed transfer fee. He made his first-team debut in a 1–0 EFL Cup defeat to Barnsley. Despite being Sabri Lamouchi's 'priority target' during the summer transfer window, Bachirou made only three appearances for Forest during the 2020–21 season. At the end of the season, Bachirou was told that he was not in Chris Hughton's plans and was free to leave the club.

=== Omonia FC ===
On 16 August 2021, Bachirou joined Cypriot First Division side Omonia Nicosia on a free transfer. In two years, he helped the club win the Cypriot Cup twice.

=== Matlock Town ===
On 21 October 2024, Bachirou returned to England, joining Northern Premier League Premier Division side Matlock Town.

== International career ==
In February 2014, Bachirou received a call-up to the Comoros national team for their friendly against Burkina Faso. Bachirou played for 90 minutes as Comoros recorded a respectable 1–1 draw in Marseille, France.

He made his first competitive appearance, and won his second cap, in the first leg of an Africa Cup of Nations first round qualifier away to Kenya in Nairobi. Bachirou started the match but could not prevent Comoros from suffering a 1–0 defeat.

== Personal life ==
Bachirou is a Muslim, and his parents hail from the Comoros. In 2019, he married his Scottish fiancée, Debbie.

== Career statistics ==
=== Club ===
As of 22 July 2023

Appearances and goals by club, season and competition
Club	Season	League			Cup		Continental		Total	
Club	Season	Division	Apps	Goals	Apps	Goals	Apps	Goals	Apps	Goals
PSG Reserves	2008–09	CFA	12	1	—		—		12	1
PSG Reserves	2009–10	CFA	10	0	—		—		10	0
PSG Reserves	Total		22	1	0	0	0	0	22	1
Greenock Morton	2010–11	Scottish First Division	19	0	7	0	—		26	1
Greenock Morton	2011–12	Scottish First Division	30	1	6	0	—		36	1
Greenock Morton	2011–12	Scottish First Division	33	1	5	0	—		38	0
Greenock Morton	2013–14	Scottish Championship	35	0	6	0	—		41	0
Greenock Morton	Total		117	2	24	0	0	0	141	2
Östersunds FK	2014	Superettan	10	0	1	0	—		11	0
Östersunds FK	2015	Superettan	29	0	0	0	—		38	0
Östersunds FK	2016	Allsvenskan	22	1	1	0	—		23	1
Östersunds FK	2017	Allsvenskan	25	1	6	0	12	1	43	2
Östersunds FK	Total		86	2	8	0	12	1	102	3
Malmö FF	2018	Allsvenskan	22	0	7	0	13	0	42	0
Malmö FF	2019	Allsvenskan	24	0	4	0	14	0	42	0
Malmö FF	2020	Allsvenskan	12	0	4	0	2	0	18	0
Malmö FF	Total		58	0	15	0	29	0	102	0
Nottingham Forest	2020–21	EFL Championship	1	0	2 (Note: Includes appearances in the FA Cup and the EFL Cup)	0	—		3	0
Omonia	2021–22	Cypriot First Division	21	0	6	0	6	0	33	0
Omonia	2022–23	Cypriot First Division	21	0	7 (Note: Includes appearance in the 2022 Cypriot Super Cup and appearances in the 2022-23 Cypriot Cup)	0	3	0	31	0
Omonia	2023–24	Cypriot First Division	23	0	1 (Note: Includes appearance in the 2023 Cypriot Super Cup and appearances in the 2023-24 Cypriot Cup)	0	0	0	24	0
Omonia	Total		65	0	14	0	9	0	88	0
Career total			326	5	63	0	50	1	439	6

== Honours ==
Östersunds FK

- Svenska Cupen: 2016–17

Malmö FF

- Allsvenskan: 2020

Omonia

- Cypriot Cup: 2021–22, 2022–23

== See also ==
- Greenock Morton F.C. season 2010–11 | 2011–12 | 2012–13 | 2013–14
- Östersunds FK season 2016 | 2017
- Malmö FF season 2018 | 2019 | 2020
