= Allan Moore =

Scottish footballer and manager

Personal information
- Date of birth: 25 December 1964 (age 61)
- Place of birth: Glasgow, Scotland
- Position: Winger

Youth career
- Possilpark YMCA

Senior career*
Years	Team	Apps	(Gls)
1983–1986	Dumbarton	41	(4)
1986–1989	Heart of Midlothian	29	(3)
1989–1994	St Johnstone	124	(23)
1994–1997	Dunfermline Athletic	106	(9)
1997–1998	Livingston	7	(1)
1998–2000	Airdrieonians	55	(6)
2000–2001	Partick Thistle	19	(1)
2001–2002	Greenock Morton	15	(1)
2002	Queen of the South	12	(1)
2002–2003	Stirling Albion	6	(0)
Total		414	(49)

Managerial career
- 2002–2010: Stirling Albion
- 2010–2013: Greenock Morton
- 2014–2015: Arbroath
- 2022: Clyde (interim)
- 2024-: Camelon Juniors
- * Club domestic league appearances and goals

Allan Moore (born 25 December 1964) is a Scottish football player and manager and is currently the manager of Camelon Juniors.

== Playing career ==
During his playing career he turned out for several Scottish clubs including Dumbarton, Heart of Midlothian, St Johnstone, Partick Thistle and Morton.

== Management career ==
Moore was appointed manager of Stirling Albion in 2002, succeeding Ray Stewart. At this time, the club was languishing at second bottom of the Third Division. Moore's impact was recognised instantly, and in the 2003–04 season he successfully guided Stirling to promotion to the Second Division. Steady progress in the next few years culminated in yet another promotion, via the playoffs, to the First Division at the end of the 2006–07 season. However, this proved too much for Stirling, as the club were relegated back into the Second Division after just one season.

In October 2009, Moore expressed a strong interest in taking the vacant managers position at former club Greenock Morton, citing the move as an opportunity to work at a full-time club. Moore then confirmed that he had been given permission to speak to Morton. However, after Morton approached Albion over the release of Moore, the compensation package of £160k – £180k was too much for Morton chairman Douglas Rae, and the deal was called off.

Moore was appointed manager of Greenock Morton on 26 May 2010. He won the First Division Manager of the Month for August 2011, and won it again in October 2012 and December 2012. Moore was sacked after a 5–1 home defeat to Livingston on 23 November 2013.

Moore was appointed manager of Arbroath in June 2014. He was sacked in April 2015 following poor form.

In November 2017, Moore was handed the role of assistant manager to Danny Lennon at Scottish League Two club Clyde. In October 2022, the club announced that Moore will take over on an interim basis, following Lennon's departure. This spell ended when Jim Duffy was appointed manager on 7 November.

== Business interests ==
According to an interview with team-mate Paul Cherry in the "J-Files" fanzine, issue 1 of November 1998, Moore operated a burger van during a housebuilding boom seen in Perth from the late 1980s as his St Johnstone career peaked. The enterprise declined in interest once builders moved on to other sites.

== Honours ==
=== Player ===
Dumbarton

- Scottish First Division promotion 1983–84

St.Johnstone

- Scottish First Division 1989–90

Dunfermline

- Scottish First Division 1995–96

=== Manager ===
Stirling Albion

- Scottish Football League Third Division promotion (1): 2003–04
- Stirlingshire Cup (3) : 2003–04, 2004–05, 2005–06
- Scottish Football League First Division play-off winners (1): 2006–07
- Scottish Football League Second Division champions (1): 2009–10

Greenock Morton

- Renfrewshire Cup (1): 2012–13

=== Assistant Manager ===
Clyde

- Scottish League One play-offs (1): 2018-19
- North Lanarkshire Cup (2): 2020-21, 2021-22

=== Personal ===
- First Division Manager of the Month (3): August 2011, October 2012, December 2012
- Second Division Manager of the Month (6): December 2005, November 2006, March 2007, January 2009, September 2009, April 2010

== Managerial statistics ==
As of 5 November 2022

Team	From	To	Record				
Team	From	To	G	W	D	L	Win %
Stirling Albion	18 June 2002	26 May 2010	352	143	95	114	40.63
Greenock Morton	26 May 2010	23 November 2013	151	57	36	58	37.75
Arbroath	25 June 2014	12 April 2015	40	18	7	15	45.00
Clyde (interim)	25 October 2022	7 November 2022	2	0	0	2	0.00
Total			545	218	138	189	40.00
