= Douglas Rae (businessman) =

Scottish businessman (1931–2018)

Duncan Douglas Foulds Rae OBE (14 June 1931 – 23 June 2018), commonly known as Douglas Rae, was a Scottish businessman. He was chairman of the Golden Casket confectionery corporation (best known for Buchanan's Toffees and Millions), as well as chairman of Greenock Morton. He was appointed OBE in the 2016 Birthday Honours.

In April 2018, Rae stood down as chairman of Morton and handed the reins to his son Crawford, who also runs Golden Casket.

He died on 23 June 2018 at the age of 87.
