= Lennoxtown training centre =

Stadium in Lennoxtown, Scotland

Coordinates: 55.976482°N 4.227355°W

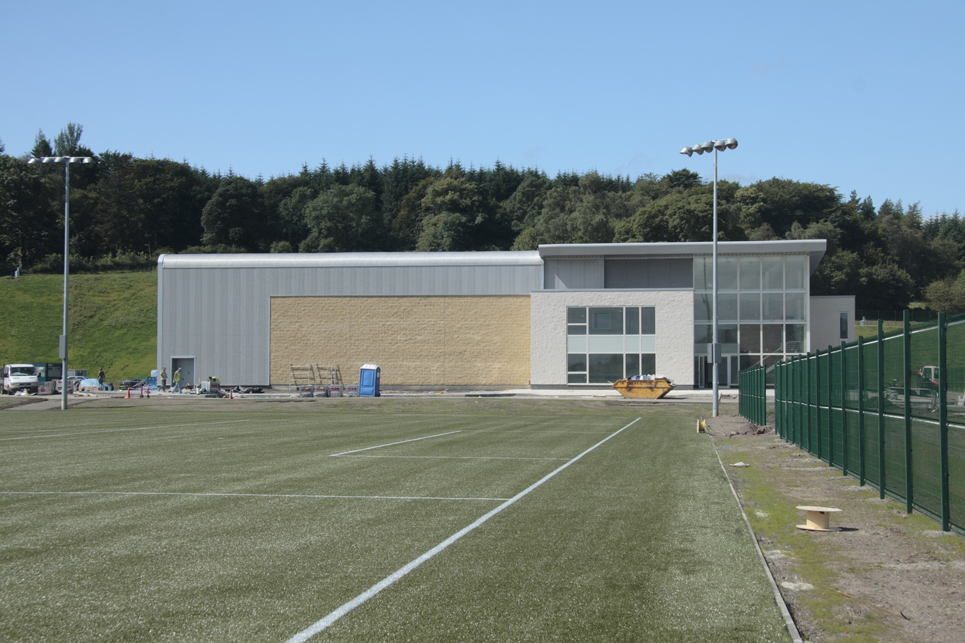
Lennoxtown training facility.

Lennoxtown Training Centre is Celtic's training centre, located at Lennoxtown, East Dunbartonshire in Scotland. The complex houses the club's training and educational facilities.

== Background ==
Lennoxtown was designed to replace Celtic's former training ground at Barrowfield (a short distance east of the club's stadium Celtic Park in the east end of Glasgow). The complex is built on former NHS land adjacent to the vacated Lennox Castle Hospital and is located on a 46-acre (190,000 m^{2}) site near the Campsie Fells; half of the site has been developed in Phase One of the project to provide the existing training facilities with the remaining land being left for development in Phase Two which will provide conference facilities and live-in dormitory areas for young players. The centre houses Celtic's entire professional footballing operation and will host the home games for Celtic's ladies team.

For many years, the training facilities which Celtic provided at Barrowfield were seen as substandard and would be hidden from potential new signings. This fact was emphasised after their rivals Rangers opened their Auchenhowie complex in 2001 and Hearts opened their Riccarton academy with Heriot-Watt University in 2004. A number of club officials and players expressed sadness at leaving Barrowfield but saw it as a necessity for the modern game and that it would aid in helping Celtic attract players to the club.

Prior to its opening, Celtic youth team coach Willie McStay stated "after years of shuttling back and forth between Barrowfield, Celtic Park and several other temporary training venues, Lennoxtown will also allow the Youth Academy coaching staff to better utilise their time during the course of a season."

In 2005, Celtic launched a successful share issue which raised £15m, much of this money would be put towards providing new training facilities. Celtic coach Tommy Burns was tasked with undertaking a fact finding mission and travelled across Europe to visit other football clubs' training grounds. Celtic chose sections from Burns's report and this was added to by former Celtic bosses Martin O'Neill and Gordon Strachan.

In December 2005, East Dunbartonshire Council's planning board approved the outline planning application to develop the training facilities on the site. The following April, the council granted a detailed permission with the leader of East Dunbartonshire Council, John Morrison, stating "I'm sure that the residents of East Dunbartonshire are delighted at the prospect of this ambitious development in their area. The Celtic training facility will potentially contribute significantly to the development of Lennoxtown and will also bring wider employment and social benefits to the area.".

== Official opening ==
The centre was officially opened on 9 October 2007 by Celtic chairman Brian Quinn at a ceremony where he was joined by Chief executive Peter Lawwell, then-Celtic manager Gordon Strachan and then Celtic captain Stephen McManus.

== Facilities ==
£8 million was spent on the construction. Indoor facilities include an indoor training hall, a fitness centre with gym and fitness suite, physio and medical facilities, sauna and steam room and hydrotherapy pool, Sports science/sports development facility, changing facilities, classroom/education facilities, football administration offices, media facilities, kit room, laundry and Groundsman's compound.

Outdoor facilities include three full-sized UEFA standard natural grass training and match pitches, with undersoil heating to the main pitch, an artificial grass pitch and an additional goalkeeping training area.

The Lennoxtown complex is just over 4 miles (6.4 km) from Rangers Training Centre, also in East Dunbartonshire (as the crow flies). Coincidentally, this is almost exactly the same as the distance across the city of Glasgow between the two clubs' main stadia.

== Site split plan ==
In 2019, Celtic announced plans to redevelop their older Barrowfield facilities in Glasgow for use by the academy and women's team, including an indoor pitch and a matchday venue augmenting the Lennoxtown base which would continue to be used by the first team squad.

== Gallery ==
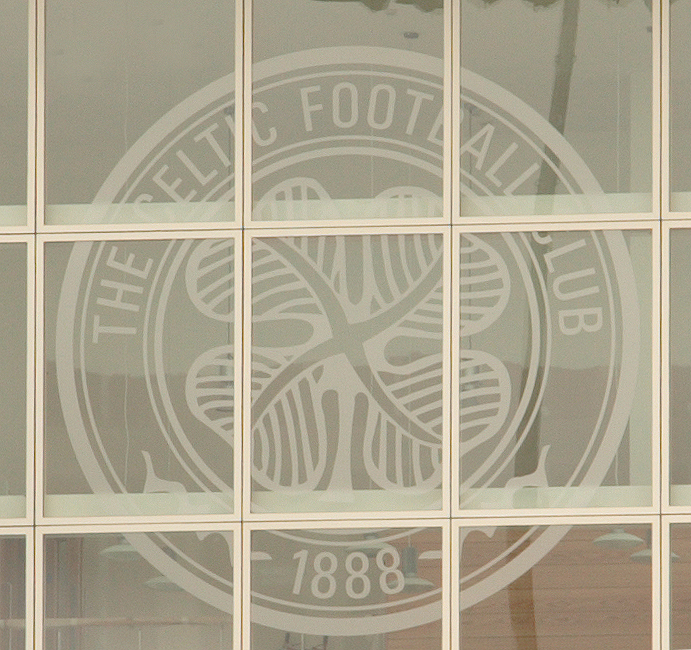
Celtic crest on glazed lobby

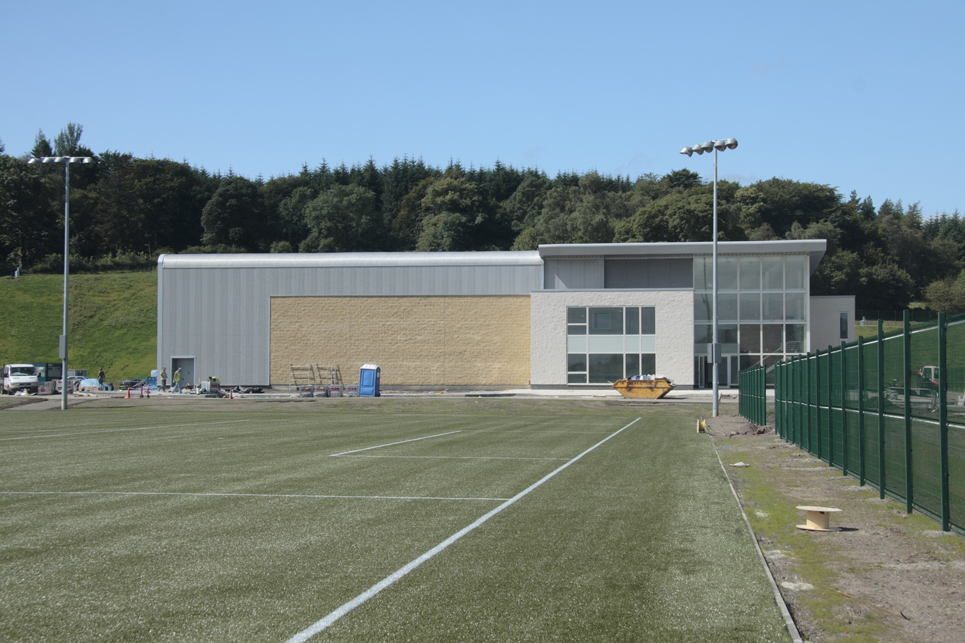
Training centre and astroturf pitch

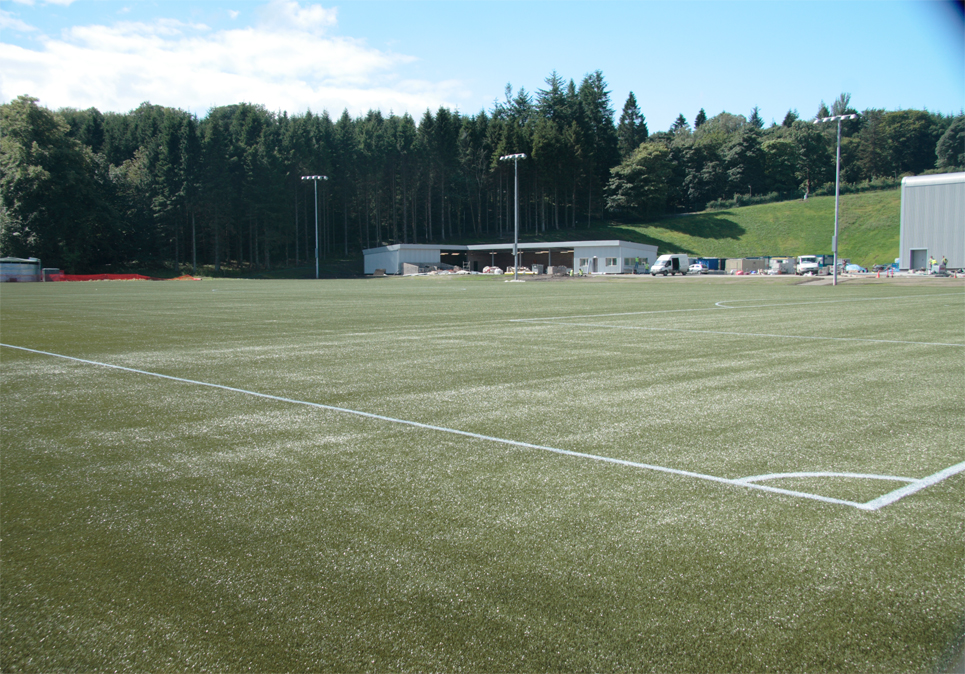
Astro-turf pitches

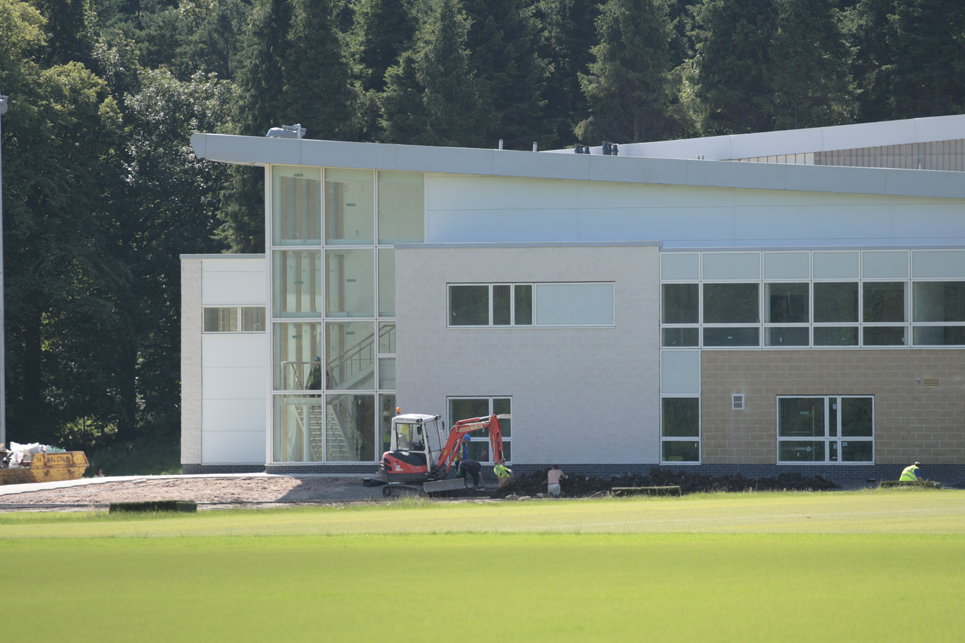
Training centre during finishing stages of construction

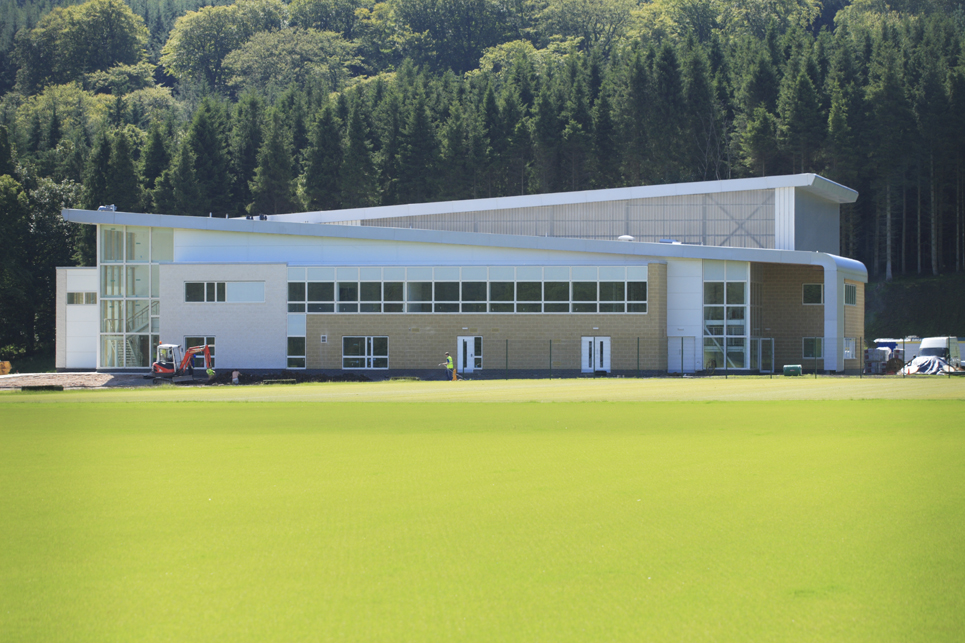
Training centre and main pitch

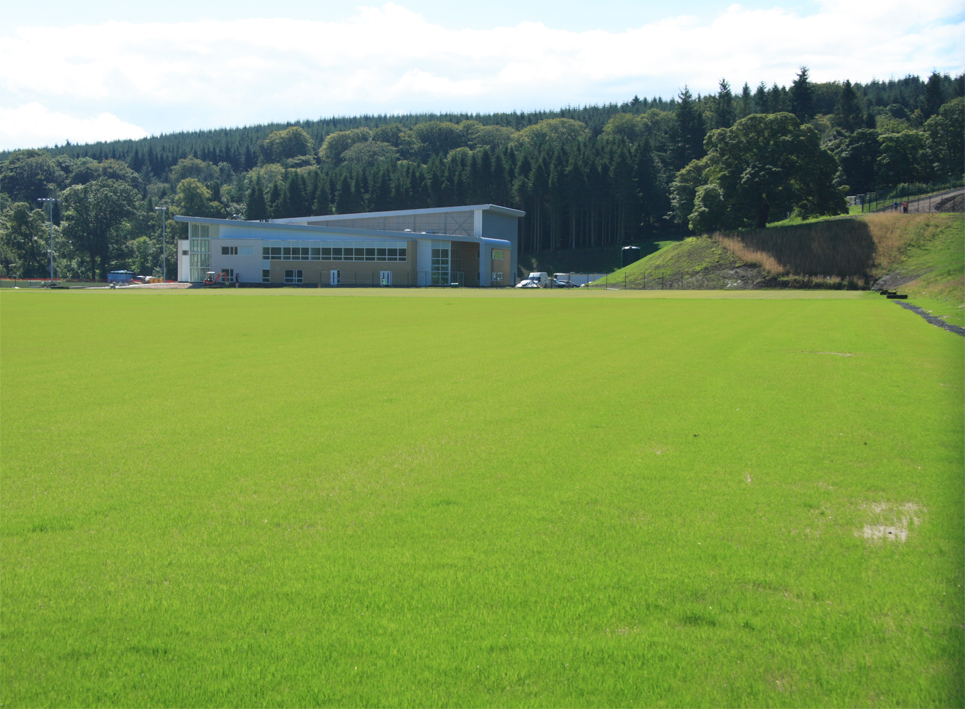
Setting beneath Campsie Fell

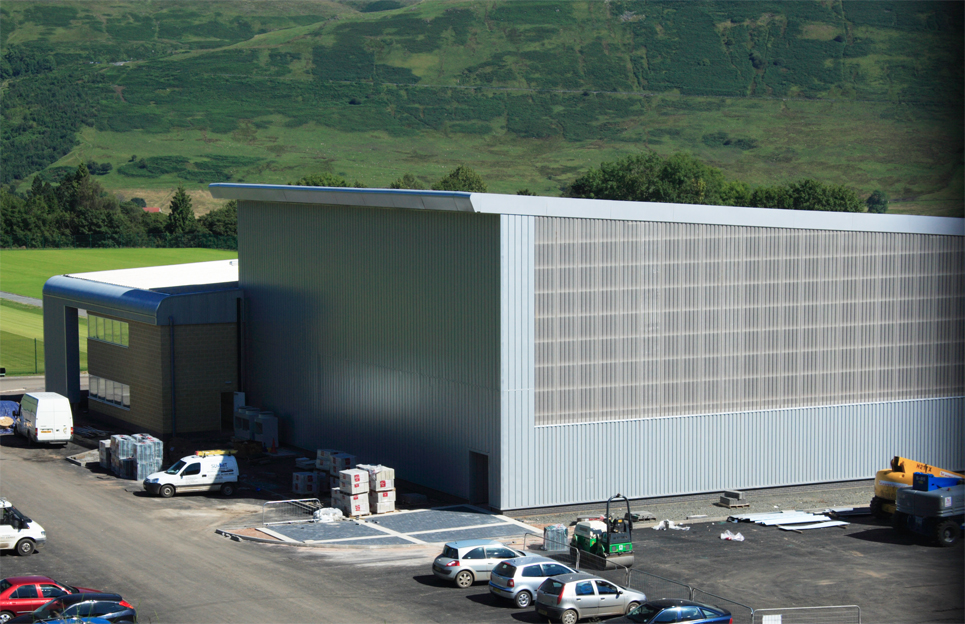
Rear of training centre during finishing stages of construction

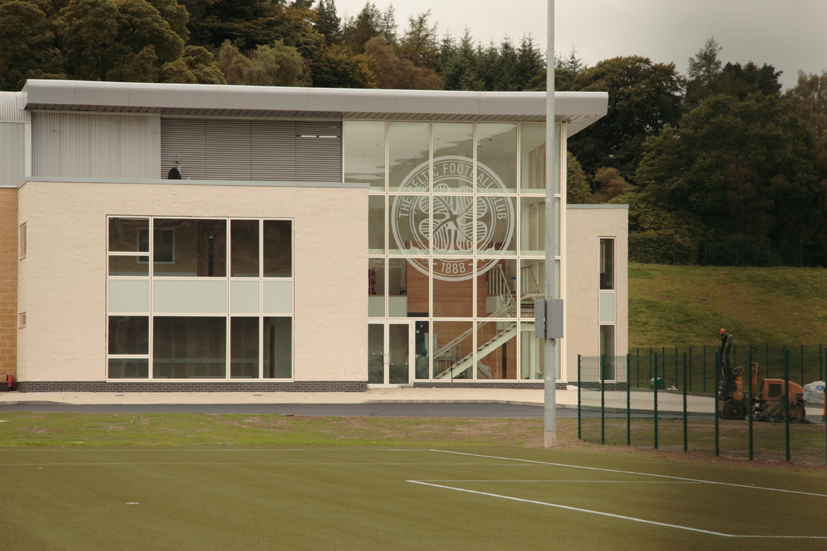
Close up of entrance lobby

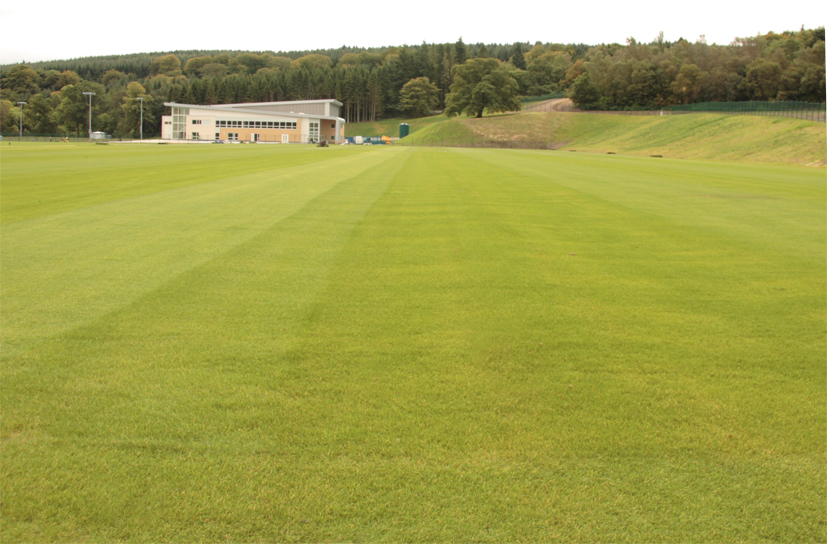
Main training pitches

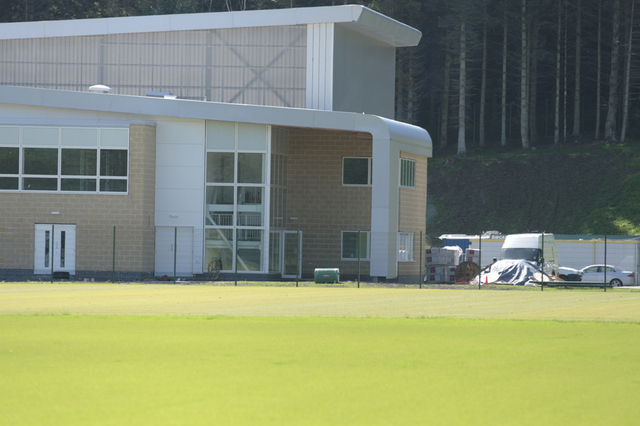
Side access to training facility

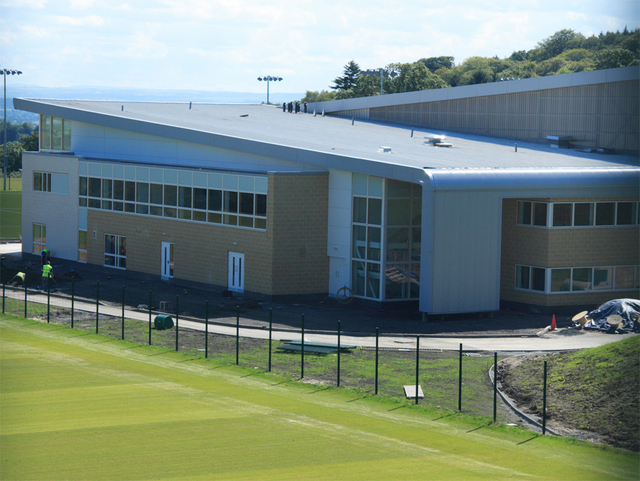
Side elevation

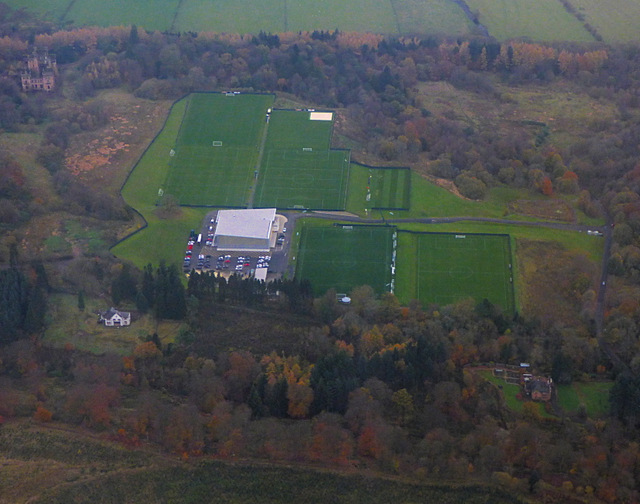
Aerial view
