= Dean (given name) =

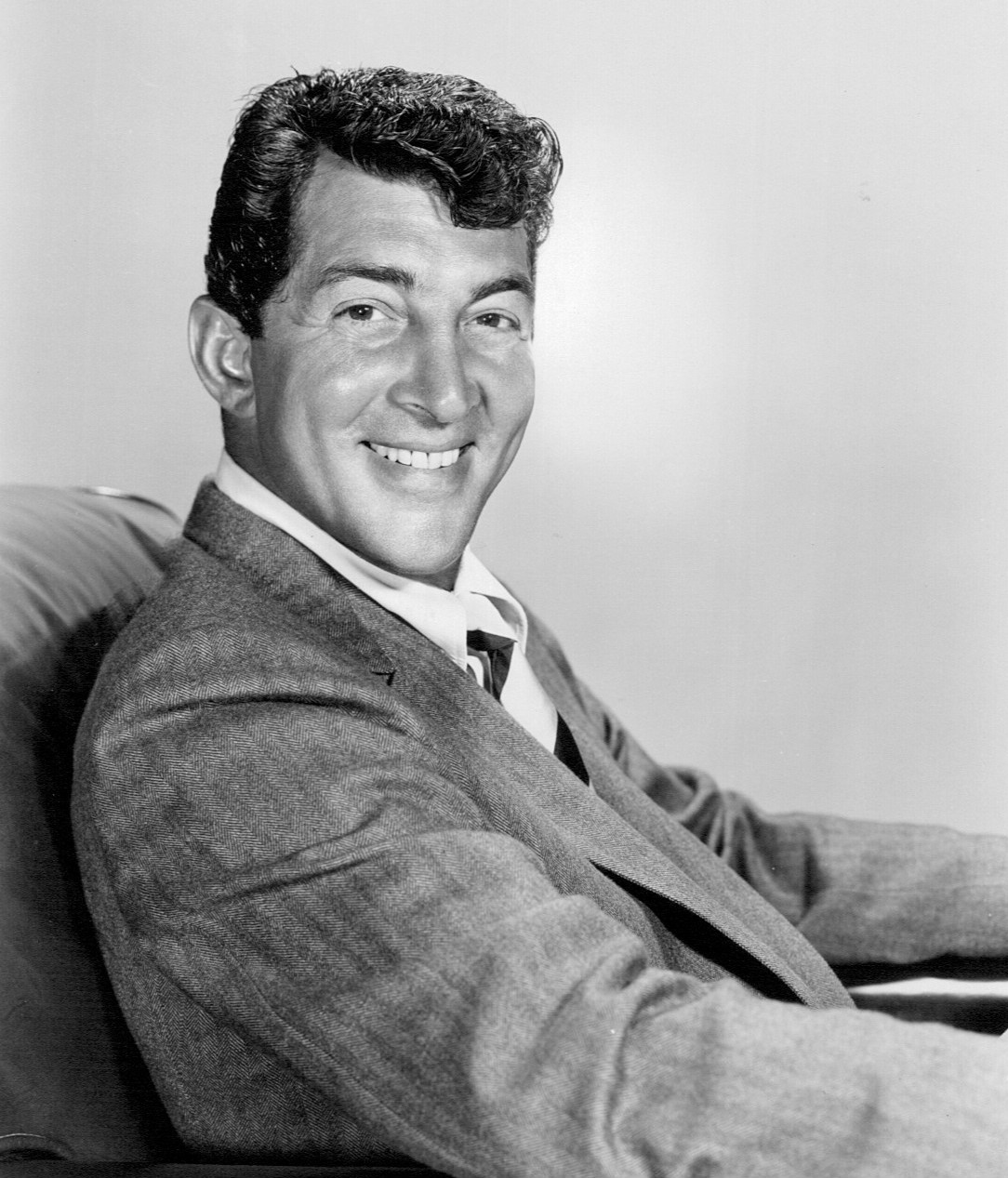
- Dean Martin in 1959
- Pronunciation: /ˈdiːn/
- Gender: Male
- Language: English

Origin
- Meaning: Valley or dean or law, justice, verdict

Dean is an English masculine given name and middle name with several origins:

- Derived from the Greek word "δεκανός" ("dekanos"), which means "monk or dignitary in charge of ten others"; see also Dean (Christianity)
- Derived from the English surname Dean, from an Anglo-Saxon word meaning "valley"
- An Anglicization of the Hebrew noun דין, meaning "law", "justice" or "verdict".

Notable people and characters with the name include:

== People ==
- Dean Acheson (1893–1971), American statesman and lawyer
- Dean Aldridge (born 1994), Australian baseball pitcher
- Dean Alexander, American country music singer
- Dean Alfange (1897–1989), American politician
- Dean Francis Alfar (born 1969), Filipino writer
- Dean Alford (born 1953), American politician and businessman
- Dean C. Allard (1933–2018), American naval historian and archivist
- Dean Allemang, American computer scientist
- Dean Allen (1966–2018), Canadian typographer, web developer and blogger
- Dean Allison (born 1965), Canadian politician
- Dean Allmark (born 1983), English professional wrestler
- Dean Alston, Australian canoeist
- Dean Alvord (1856–1941), American real estate developer and college professor
- Dean Amadon (1912–2003), American ornithologist
- Dean Anastasiadis (born 1970), Australian soccer player
- Dean Andal (born 1959), American businessman and politician
- Dean Anderson (born 1967), Australian rules footballer
- Dean Anderson (ice hockey) (born 1966), Canadian ice hockey player
- Dean Andrews (born 1963), English actor
- Dean Andrews Jr. (1922–1981), American attorney
- Dean Anna (born 1986), American basketball player
- Dean R. Appling, American biochemist
- Dean Armstrong (born 1973), Canadian actor
- Dean Arp (born 1966), American politician
- Dean Arsene (born 1980), Canadian ice hockey player
- Dean Ashton (born 1983), English footballer
- Dean Askew (born 1962), New Zealand cricketer
- Dean Aspen, British actor
- Dean Astumian, American physical chemist
- Dean Atta, British poet
- Dean Austin (born 1970), English footballer
- Dean G. Auten (1937–2026), American politician
- Dean Babst (1921–2006), American sociologist
- Dean Bailey (1967–2014), Australian rules footballer and coach
- Dean Baker (born 1958), American macroeconomist
- Dean Bakopoulos, American writer
- Dean Bandiera (1926–2020), Canadian football player
- Dean Baquet (born 1956), American journalist
- Dean Baranja (born 1971), Slovenian footballer
- Dean Barker, several people
- Dean Barkley (born 1950), American lawyer and politician
- Dean Barnett (1967–2008), American columnist and blogger
- Dean Barrett, American writer
- Dean Barrick (born 1969), English footballer
- Dean Barrow (born 1951), Prime Minister of Belize (2008–2020)
- Dean Bartlett (born 1987), New Zealand cricketer
- Dean Barton-Smith (born 1967), Australian decathlete
- Dean Bauck (born 1954), Canadian high jumper
- Dean Beard (1935–1989), American musician
- Dean Beckwith (born 1983), English footballer
- Dean Bell (cricketer) (born 1992), English cricketer
- Dean Bell (born 1962), New Zealand rugby league footballer and coach
- Dean Benamar (born 2008), English footballer
- Dean Benedetti (1922–1957), American jazz musician
- Dean Bennett (born 1977), English footballer
- Dean Bergeron (born 1969), Canadian Paralympic athlete
- Dean Bernardini (born 1973), American musician
- Dean Berta Viñales (2006–2021), Spanish motorcycle road racer
- Dean Bertram, Australian writer, filmmaker and film festival director
- Dean Beța (born 1991), Romanian footballer
- Dean Biasucci (born 1962), American football player
- Dean Black, American politician from Florida
- Dean Blackwell (born 1969), English footballer
- Dean Blais (born 1951), American ice hockey coach
- Dean Blandino (born 1971), American football executive and rules analyst
- Dean Blevins (born 1955), American sportscaster
- Dean Blore (born 1998), Samoa international rugby league footballer
- Dean Blundell, Canadian radio host
- Dean Blunt (born 1984), British singer-songwriter and musician
- Dean Bombač (born 1989), Slovenian handball player
- Dean Booth, New Zealand Paralympic swimmer
- Dean Borg (1938–2020), American journalist
- Dean Bosnich (born 1980), Australian rugby league footballer
- Dean Botha (born 1964), South African tennis player
- Dean Bouzanis (born 1990), Australian footballer
- Dean Bowditch (born 1986), English footballer
- Dean Bowring, English powerlifter
- Dean Bowyer, American baseball coach
- Dean Boxall, Australian swimming coach
- Dean Boylan (born 1951), American ice hockey player
- Dean Brelis (1924–2006), American journalist
- Dean Brennan (born 1980), Irish footballer and current manager
- Dean L. Bresciani, American academic administrator
- Dean Brett (born 1992), Scottish footballer
- Dean Brill (born 1985), English footballer
- Dean Britt (born 1994), Australian rugby league footballer
- Dean Brody (born 1975), Canadian country music artist
- Dean Brogan (born 1978), Australian rules footballer
- Dean Brooks (1916–2013), American physician and actor
- Dean Brosnan (born 1991), Irish hurler
- Dean Brotherston (born 1997), Scottish footballer
- Dean Brown, several people
- Dean Brownlie (born 1984), New Zealand cricketer
- Dean F. Bryson (1910–1995), American judge
- Dean Buchanan (born 1953), New Zealand painter
- Dean Budd (born 1986), New Zealand-born Italian rugby union player
- Dean Budnick, American writer, filmmaker and professor
- Dean Buntrock (born 1931), American businessman
- Dean Burch (1927–1991), American lawyer and politician
- Dean Burk (1904–1988), American biochemist and medical researcher
- Dean Burke (born 1957), American politician
- Dean Burmester (born 1989), Zimbabwean-born South African golfer
- Dean Burrows (born 1966), English cricketer
- Dean Burry, Canadian composer, librettist and educator
- Dean Busby (born 1973), English rugby league footballer
- Dean Butler, several people
- Dean Byington, American visual artist
- Dean Byrne, several people
- Dean Cain (born 1966), American actor
- Dean Caliguire (born 1967), American football player
- Dean Callaway (born 1970), Australian rugby league footballer
- Dean Cameron (born 1962), American actor, musician, and comedian
- Dean Cameron (inventor), Australian inventor
- Dean Cameron (politician) (born 1961), American politician from Idaho
- Dean Campbell (born 2001), Scottish footballer
- Dean Cannon (born 1968), American politician
- Dean Canto (born 1980), Australian motor racing driver
- Dean Capobianco (born 1970), Australian sprinter
- Dean Carlson (1950–2022), American football player
- Dean Carnegie, American stage magician, escape artist and painter
- Dean Carney (born 1961), Australian rugby league footballer
- Dean Carroll (1962–2015), English rugby league footballer
- Dean Vincent Carter (born 1976), English fiction author
- Dean Carter (born 1955), American spree killer
- Deen Castronovo (born 1964), American rock drummer
- Dean Caswell (1922–2022), American flying ace
- Dean and Dan Caten (born 1964), Canadian fashion designer brothers
- Dean Cavanagh (born 1966), playwright and musician
- Dean Cetrulo (1919–2010), American fencer
- Dean Chalkley (born 1968), British photographer
- Dean Chamberlain, American photographer
- Dean Champion (1940–2009), American professor of Criminal Justice
- Dean Chance (1941–2015), American baseball player
- Dean Chandler (born 1976), English footballer
- Dean Chapman (1931–1965), Australian rules footballer
- Dean Roden Chapman (1922–1995), American scientist and engineer
- Dean Chenoweth (1937–1982), American hydroplane racing pilot
- Dean Chynoweth (born 1968), Canadian ice hockey player
- Dean Clancy (born 2001), Irish boxer
- Dean Clark, several people
- Dean Clarke, several people
- Dean Clukey (1936–2019), American politician
- Dean Cogan (1826–1872), Irish Roman Catholic priest
- Dean Cokinos, American football coach
- Dean Coleman (footballer) (born 1985), English association footballer
- Dean Coleman (rugby union)
- Dean Collins, several people
- Dean Collis (born 1985), Australian rugby league footballer
- Dean Colton (born 1983), former Scotland international rugby league footballer
- Dean W. Colvard (1913–2007), President of Mississippi State University
- Dean Combs (born 1952), American stock car racing driver
- Dean Coney (born 1963), English footballer
- Dean Conley (1946–2010), American politician
- Dean Connors (born 2003), American football player
- Dean Cook (born 1985), British actor
- Dean Cooley (born 1934), American politician
- Dean Copely (born 1989), American ice dancer
- Dean Corll (1939–1973), American serial killer and rapist
- Dean Cornelius (born 2001), Scottish footballer
- Dean Cornwell (1892–1960), American illustrator and painter
- Dean Corren (1955–2023), American politician and scientist
- Dean Cosker (born 1978), English footballer
- Dean Couzins (born 1981), New Zealand field hockey player
- Dean Cox (born 1981), Australian rules footballer
- Dean Cox (English footballer) (born 1987)
- Dean Craig (born 1974), British film director and screenwriter
- Dean Craven (born 1979), English footballer
- Dean Crawford (1958–2023), Canadian rower
- Dean Crawford (author), British author
- Dean Cray (born 1958), American politician
- Dean Crombie (born 1957), English footballer
- Dean Cromwell (1879–1962), American sports coach
- Dean Crouch, Irish dancer and musician
- Dean Crow (born 1972), American baseball player
- Dean Crowe (born 1979), English footballer
- Dean Cummings (born 1993), Scottish footballer
- Dean Cundey (born 1946), American cinematographer and film director
- Dean Daley-Jones, Australian actor
- Dean Daughtry (1946–2023), American musician
- Dean David (born 1996), Israeli association footballer
- Dean Davidson, American musician
- Dean Davis, American politician
- Dean DeBlois (born 1970), Canadian filmmaker
- Dean Deetz (born 1993), American baseball player
- Dean DeFazio (born 1963), Canadian ice hockey player
- Dean Del Mastro (born 1970), Canadian politician
- Dean Delannoit (born 1989), Belgian pop singer
- Dean Delany (born 1980), Irish footballer
- Dean Delaurier (born 1954), Canadian ice sledge hockey player
- Dean DeLeo (born 1961), American guitarist
- Dean DellaPenna, American plant biochemist
- Dean Demopoulos (born 1954), American professional basketball coach
- Dean Dempsey, American artist, actor and filmmaker
- Dean DeNobile (born 2003), American football player
- Dean DePiero (born 1968), American politician
- Dean Derby (1935–2021), American football player
- Dean Detton (1908–1958), American professional wrestler
- Dean Devlin (born 1962), American filmmaker
- Dean Dill (1947–2015), American magician and effects designer
- Dean Dillon (born 1955), American singer-songwriter
- Dean Dingman (born 1968), American football player and coach
- Dean Dixon (1915–1976), American conductor
- Dean Dodds (born 1977), New Zealand footballer
- Dean Dohrman (1959–2024), American politician
- Dean Dorsey (born 1957), Canadian gridiron football player
- Dean Downing (born 1975), English bicycle racer
- Dean Drako, American businessman and entrepreneur
- Dean Drayton, Australian Minister of the Uniting Church
- Dean Drever (born 1970), Canadian sculptor
- Dean Drummond (1949–2013), American classical composer
- Dean Dugdale (born 1963), Australian rules footballer
- Dean Dugger (1933–2000), American football player
- Dean Duperron, Canadian businessman
- Dean Ebarle (born 1998), Filipino footballer
- Dean Ebbe (born 1994), Irish professional footballer
- Dean Edell (born 1941), American physician and broadcaster
- Dean Edwards, several people
- Dean Ehehalt (born 1964), American baseball player and coach
- Dean Ehlers (1929–2017), American college sports coach and administrator
- Dean Elgar (born 1987), South African cricketer
- Dean Elliott (1917–1999), American television and film composer
- Dean Ellison (born 1977), British motorcycle racer
- Dean Emerson (born 1962), English footballer
- Dean Erickson (born 1958), American actor
- Dean Evans (born 1990), Australian footballer
- Dean Evans (field hockey) (born 1967), Australian field hockey player
- Dean Evason (born 1964), Canadian ice hockey player and coach
- Dean Eyre (1914–2007), New Zealand politician
- Dean Fagan, British actor
- Dean Faiello (born 1959), American criminal
- Dean Faithfull (born 1987), English gridiron football player
- Dean Falk (born 1944), American anthropologist
- Dean Fansler, American professor at Columbia University and Filipino folklorist
- Dean Farnham (born 1950), Australian rules footballer
- Dean Farris (born 1997), American swimmer
- Dean Fasano (1955–2009), American singer-songwriter
- Dean Fausett (1913–1998), American painter
- Dean Fedorchuk (born 1970), Canadian ice hockey player and coach
- Dean Fearing, American chef
- Dean Fearn (born 2008), Scottish competitive swimmer
- Dean Fertita (born 1970), American rock musician
- Dean Finlay (born 1965), New Zealand cricketer
- Dean Fiore (born 1983), Australian professional racing driver
- Dean E. Fischer (1936–2000), American journalist and U. S. Assistant Secretary of State
- Dean Fisher (born 1956), American politician
- Dean Fleischer Camp (born 1984), American filmmaker
- Dean Florez (born 1963), American politician
- Dean Forbes (born 1978), British business executive
- Dean Ford (1945–2018), Scottish singer and songwriter
- Dean Fourie, South African actor
- Dean Foxcroft (born 1998), South African cricketer
- Dean Francis (1974–2018), English boxer
- Dean Fraser (born 1957), Jamaican saxophonist
- Dean Fredericks (1924–1999), American actor
- Dean Friedman (born 1955), American singer-songwriter
- Dean Fujioka (born 1980), Japanese actor, musician, and model
- Dean Fuleihan (born 1951), American civil servant
- Dean Fuller, American ice hockey coach
- Dean Furman (born 1988), South African footballer
- Dean Gaffney (born 1978), English actor
- Dean Gal (born 1995), Israeli footballer
- Dean Galea (born 1985), Australian rules footballer
- Dean Gallo (1934–1994), American politician
- Dean Galt (born 1971), New Zealand badminton player
- Dean Garcia (born 1958), British musician
- Dean Gardikiotis (born 1994), Greek footballer
- Dean Garrett (born 1966), American basketball player
- Dean Gaskell (born 1983), Ireland rugby league footballer
- Dean Gemmell (born 1967), Canadian-American curler
- Dean Gerken (born 1985), English footballer
- Dean Geyer (born 1986), Australian singer/actor
- Dean M. Gillespie (1884–1949), American politician
- Dean Gitter (1935–2018), American businessman
- Dean Glenesk (born 1957), American modern pentathlete
- Dean Glover (born 1963), English footballer
- Dean Goffin (1916–1984), New Zealand composer
- Dean Goldfine (born 1965), American tennis coach and player
- Dean Goodhill (born 1944), American film editor
- Dean Gordon (born 1973), English footballer
- Dean Gordon (sailor) (born 1959, Olympic sailor from Australia
- Dean Gorré (born 1970), Surinamese footballer and manager
- Dean Gould, world record holder
- Dean Green (born 1989), American baseball player
- Dean Greenaway (born 1959), British Virgin Islands sprinter
- Dean Greig (born 1968), Australian rules footballer
- Dean Greygoose (born 1964), English footballer
- Dean Greyling (born 1986), South African rugby union player
- Dean Griffing (1915–1998), American gridiron football player, coach and executive
- Dean Griffiths (born 1980), Jamaican hurdler
- Dean Guezen (born 1999), Dutch footballer
- Dean Gunnarson (born 1964), Canadian escape artist
- Dean Hachamovitch, American businessman and manager
- Dean Hadley (born 1992), English professional rugby league footballer
- Dean Haglund (born 1965), Canadian actor
- Dean Hagopian, Canadian actor, radio personality and musician
- Dean Hall, several people
- Dean Halverson (born 1946), American football player
- Dean Hamel (born 1961), American football player
- Dean Hamer (born 1951), American geneticist
- Dean Hamiti (born 2003), American wrestler
- Dean Hammond (rugby player) (born 1992), South African rugby union player
- Dean Hammond (born 1983), English footballer
- Dean Hanson (born 1964), Australian rugby league footballer
- Dean Harding (born 1971), Australian rules footballer
- Dean Harens (1920–1996), American actor
- Dean Hargrove (born 1938), American screenwriter
- Dean Harris (born 1946), British actor
- Dean Harrison (born 1989), English motorcycle road racer
- Dean Harriss, Australian politician
- Dean Evan Hart (born 1957), American optometrist
- Dean Hart (1954–1990), Canadian wrestler
- Dean Hartgraves (born 1966), American baseball player
- Dean Hartigan (born 1954), Australian rules footballer
- Dean Hartle (1931–2018), American businessman, farmer and politician
- Dean Haspiel (born 1967), American comics writer/artist
- Dean Hassard, Canadian politician
- Dean Hawkes (born 1938), British architect and academic
- Dean Hawkins (born 1999), Australian rugby league footballer
- Dean Hawkshaw (born 1997), Scottish footballer
- Dean Headley (born 1970), English cricketer
- Dean Heffernan (born 1980), Australian soccer player
- Dean Heil (born 1995), American wrestler
- Dean Heller (born 1960), American politician
- Dean Helmick, American politician
- Dean Henderson (born 1997), English footballer
- Dean Herbert, several people
- Dean Herridge (born 1976), Australian rally driver
- Dean Hess (1917–2015), American minister and Air Force officer
- Dean Hewitt (born 1994), Australian curler
- Dean Hill (1986–2021), Iroquois lacrosse player
- Dean Ho, several people
- Dean Hodgson (born 1966), English cricketer
- Dean Hoff, American novelist
- Dean Hoffman (born 1966), English cricketer
- Dean Hoge (1937–2008), American sociologist
- Dean Holden (born 1979), English footballer
- Dean Holdsworth (born 1968), English footballer
- Dean Holland, American television director and producer
- Dean Holness (born 1976), English footballer and actor
- Dean Hood (born 1963), American football player and coach
- Dean Hooper (born 1971), English footballer
- Dean Hopkins (born 1959), Canadian ice hockey player
- Dean Hopp (born 1982), South African rugby union player
- Dean Horribine (born 1993), Scottish footballer
- Dean Horrix (1961–1990), English footballer
- Dean Houle, American Paralympic athlete and powerlifter
- Dean Howard (musician) (born 1961), guitarist
- Dean Howard (footballer) (born 1976), former Australian rules footballer
- Dean Howell (born 1980), English footballer
- Dean Howes (born 1952), American sports manager
- Dean A. Hrbacek, American lawyer
- Dean Hsieh (born 1973), American artist, writer and animator
- Dean L. Hubbard (1939–2025), American academic administrator
- Dean Hubbard (1953–2018), American musician
- Dean Hudnutt (1891–1943), American sports shooter
- Dean Hughes (born 1943), American novelist
- Dean Huiberts (born 2000), Dutch footballer
- Dean Huijsen (born 2005), Spanish footballer
- Dean Hunger (born 1958), American basketball player
- Dean Hurley, American composer and sound designer
- Dean Ieremia (born 2001), Samoan rugby league footballer
- Dean Ing (1931–2020), American author and university professor
- Dean Irving (born 1966), Australian rules footballer
- Dean Isaacson (born 1941), American statistician
- Dean Israelite (born 1984), South African film director
- Dean Jaensch (1936–2022), Australian political scientist
- Dean Jagger (1903–1991), American actor
- Dean James, several people
- Dean Jamison, American economist and global health scholar
- Dean Jarvis (born 1992), Northern Irish footballer
- Dean Jeffries (born 1971), American politician
- Dean Jenkins (born 1959), American ice hockey player
- Dean C. Jessee, historian on the LDS Church
- Dean Joanisse (born 1971), Canadian curler
- Dean Jobb, Canadian writer
- Dean John-Wilson (born 1989), British actor
- Dean Johnson, several people
- Dean Jones, several people
- Dean Kalimniou, Australian lawyer and writer
- Dean Kamen (born 1951), American engineer, inventor, and businessman, inventor of the Segway, founder of FIRST
- Dean Karlan, American economist
- Dean Karnazes (born 1962), American ultramarathon runner
- Dean T. Kashiwagi (1952–2025), American academic in the field of procurement
- Dean Kaufert (born 1957), American politician
- Dean Kay (born 1940), American songwriter
- Dean Keates (born 1978), English footballer
- Dean H. Kedes (born 1960), American scientist
- Dean Keenan (born 1985), Scottish footballer
- Dean Keener (born 1965), American basketball player and coach
- Dean Kelley (1931–1996), American basketball player
- Dean M. Kelley (1926–1997), American legal scholar
- Dean W. Kelley (1876–1952), American lawyer
- Dean Kelly, several people
- Dean Kemp (born 1969), Australian rules footballer
- Dean Kenneally (born 1967), Australian physiotherapist
- Dean Kennedy (born 1963), Canadian ice hockey player
- Dean Kennedy (American football)
- Dean Kenny (born 1961), New Zealand rugby union player
- Dean Kent, several people
- Dean Kiekhefer (born 1989), American baseball player
- Dean Kiely (born 1970), Irish association football player
- Dean King (born 1962), American naval historian
- Dean Kino (born 1971), Australian cricketer and cricket administrator
- Dean Kirby (born 1946), American politician
- Dean Klafurić (born 1972), Croatian football manager
- Dean Knudson (born 1961), American Republican politician
- Dean Kohler, American rock musician
- Dean Kolstad (born 1968), Canadian ice hockey player
- Dean Komel (born 1960), Slovenian philosopher
- Dean Kondziolka (born 1972), Canadian swimmer
- Dean Koolhof (born 1994), Dutch footballer
- Dean Koontz (born 1945), American author
- Dean Kramer (born 1952), American pianist
- Dean Kremer (born 1996), Israeli-American baseball player
- Dean Kreps (born 1961), American football player and coach
- Dean Kruse (born 1941), American politician
- Dean Kuipers (born 1964), American journalist and author
- Dean Kukan (born 1993), Swiss ice hockey player
- Dean Kuriakose (born 1981), Indian politician
- Dean Laing (born 1970), South African cricketer
- Dean S. Laird (1921–2022), American Naval officer
- Dean Ivan Lamb (1886–1956), American pioneer aviator and mercenary
- Dean LaMont, American television director
- Dean Lance (born 1959), Australian rugby league coach and footballer
- Dean L. Larsen (1927–2019), Mormon leader
- Dean Laun (1925–2011), American football player and coach
- Dean Lawford (born 1977), English rugby league footballer
- Dean Leacock (born 1984), English footballer
- Dean Lee, American nuclear theorist, researcher and educator
- Dean Lesher (1903–1993), American journalist
- Dean Letourneau (born 2006), Canadian ice hockey player
- Dean Lewington (born 1984), English footballer
- Dean Lewis (born 1989), Australian singer-songwriter
- Dean Lickyer, Canadian musical artist
- Dean Liço (born 2000), Albanian footballer
- Dean Lindo (1932–2018), Belizean attorney and politician
- Dean Lister (born 1976), American mixed martial arts fighter
- Dean Ljubančić (born 1969), Croatian footballer
- Dean Lockhart (born 1968), Scottish conservative politician
- Dean Lombardi (born 1958), American ice hockey player
- Dean Lonergan (born 1965), New Zealand boxing promoter
- Dean Look (born 1937), American football and baseball player
- Dean Lorey (born 1967), American writer
- Dean Loucks (1935–2014), American football player and coach
- Dean Lowry (born 1994), American football player
- Dean Lukin (born 1960), Australian weightlifter
- Dean Lupson (born 1969), Australian rules footballer
- Dean Lyness (born 1991), English footballer
- Dean MacDonald (born 2000), British racing driver
- Dean Macey (born 1977), English athlete
- Dean Macpherson (born 1985), South African politician
- Dean Magee (born 1955), Canadian ice hockey player
- Dean Magraw, American musician
- Dean Mahomed (1759–1851), Indian traveler, surgeon and entrepreneur
- Dean Maimoni (born 1990), Israeli footballer
- Dean Malenko (born 1960), American professional wrestler
- Dean Malkoc (born 1970), Canadian ice hockey player
- Dean-Carlos Manibog (born 1968), Filipino wrestler
- Dean Margetts (born 1974), Australian rules football umpire
- Dean Marlowe (born 1992), American football player
- Dean Marney, several people
- Dean Marsh (born 1963), English cricketer
- Dean Marshall (born 1969), Canadian film, television and theatre actor, writer and director
- Dean Martin, several people
- Dean Mason (footballer) (born 1989), English-born Montserratian footballer
- Dean Mason (hurler) (born 2000), Irish hurler
- Dean Mathey (1890–1972), American tennis player
- Dean Matterson (born 1997), Australian rugby league footballer
- Dean Matthews (born 1971), Australian rules footballer
- Dean L. May (1938–2003), American historian
- Dean May (born 1962), American football player
- Dean Mazhawidza (born 1991), Zimbabwean cricketer
- Dean McAdams (1917–1996), American football player
- Dean McAmmond (born 1973), Canadian ice hockey player
- Dean McCullough (born 1992), Northern Irish radio presenter
- Dean McDermott (born 1966), Canadian actor
- Dean McDonald (born 1986), English footballer
- Dean McGilvray (born 1988), English rugby league footballer
- Dean McKeown (born 1960), British jockey
- Dean McLaughlin, several people
- Dean McRae (born 1968), Australian rules footballer
- Dean McTaggart, Canadian singer-songwriter and record producer
- Dean Mealy (1915–1973), American basketball player
- Dean O. Mehlhaff (1927–2016), American politician
- Dean Melanson (born 1973), Canadian ice hockey player
- Dean Mellway, Canadian ice sledge hockey player
- Dean Meminger (1948–2013), American basketball player and coach
- Dean Menta (born 1966), American musician
- Dean Mercer (1969–2017), Australian sportsman
- Dean Metropoulos (born 1946), American billionaire businessman
- Dean Mildren (born 1943), Australian judge
- Dean Miller (born 1965), American country singer, songwriter and music producer
- Dean A. Miller (1931–2018), American folklorist
- Dean Milwain (born 1986), British swimmer
- Dean Minors (born 1970), Bermudian cricketer
- Dean Miraldi (born 1958), American football player
- Dean Mitchell, American painter
- Dean Monogenis, Greek-American painter and sculptor
- Dean Moon (1927–1987), American racing driver
- Dean Moon (rugby league) (born 1975), Australian rugby league footballer
- Dean Mooney (born 1956), English footballer
- Dean Morgan, several people
- Dean Morrison (born 1978), Australian cricketer
- Dean Mortimer, American politician from Idaho
- Dean Morton (born 1968), Canadian ice hockey player and referee
- Dean Mosher, American artist, author and historian
- Dean Mountain, English rugby league footballer
- Dean Moxey (born 1986), English footballer
- Dean Moyar, American philosopher
- Dean Muir (born 1989), South African rugby union player
- Dean Mullaney (born 1954), American editor, publisher and designer
- Dean Mumm (born 1984), Australian rugby union player
- Dean Murdock, Canadian politician
- Dean Murray, several people
- Dean Nalder (born 1966), Australian politician
- Dean Neal (born 1961), English footballer
- Dean Neikirk, American engineer
- Dean Nesmith, American football player and athletic trainer
- Dean Neu, Canadian accounting academic
- Dean Neugent (1916–2003), American politician
- Dean Nicolle, Australian botanist, arborist and ecologist
- Dean Noel (born 1969), American gridiron football player
- Dean Norris (born 1963), American actor
- Dean Northover (born 1991), Canadian football player
- Dean Notting (born 1966), Australian rules footballer
- Dean Harold Noyes (1898–1968), American orthodontist
- Dean Nyquist (1935–2014), American politician
- Dean O'Banion (1892–1924), American mobster
- Dean O'Gorman (born 1976), New Zealand actor
- Dean Obeidallah (born 1969), American comedian
- Dean Odlum, Irish Gaelic footballer
- Dean Oldershaw (born 1946), Canadian sprint canoeist and kayaker
- Dean Oliver, several people
- Dean Omori (born 1968), British musician and writer
- Dean Ormston, British-born comic book artist
- Dean Ornish (born 1953), American physician
- Dean Orr, New Zealand rugby league footballer
- Dean Ouellet (born 1987), Canadian ice hockey player
- Dean Owens, Scottish singer songwriter
- Dean Ožbolt (1967–2003), Croatian handball player
- Dean Pacheco (born 1972), Trinidad and Tobago footballer
- Dean Palmer (born 1968), American baseball player
- Dean Parata (born 1991), Australian footballer in the Italy international rugby league
- Dean Parisot (born 1952), American film and television director
- Dean Parker (1947–2020), New Zealand screenwriter
- Dean Parks (born 1946), American guitarist and record producer
- Dean Parrett (born 1991), English footballer
- Dean Parrish (1942–2021), American singer
- Dean Paul, American football coach
- Dean Pay (born 1969), Australian RL coach and former rugby league footballer
- Dean Peer (born 1969), English footballer
- Dean Pees (born 1949), American football coach
- Dean Pelekanos (born 2001), Australian football player
- Dean Pelman, American-Israeli baseball player
- Dean Perrett, Australian singer-songwriter
- Dean Peterson, several people
- Dean Phillips (born 1969), American businessman and politician
- Dean Philpott (born 1935), American football player
- Dean Phipps, New Zealand sailor
- Dean Pitchford (born 1951), American songwriter, screenwriter, director, actor and novelist
- Dean A. Pinkert (born 1956), American trade lawyer
- Dean Pithie (born 1974), British former professional boxer
- Dean Pleasants (born 1965), American guitarist
- Dean du Plessis, Zimbabwean cricket commentator
- Dean Plocher (born 1970), American politician
- Dean Podgornik (born 1979), Slovenian cyclist
- Dean A. Pogreba (1922–1965), U. S. Air Force officer
- Dean Poll (born 1957), American restaurateur
- Dean Polo (born 1986), Australian rules footballer
- Dean Pooley (born 1986), English footballer
- Dean Potter (1972–2015), American climber
- Dean Potter (cricketer) (born 1970), New Zealand cricketer
- Dean Prater (1958–1996), American football player
- Dean Pregerson (born 1951), American judge
- Dean Prentice (1932–2019), Canadian ice hockey player
- Dean Preston, American politician
- Dean Prosser, several people
- Dean Pryor (1930–2019), American football player, coach and decathlete
- Dean Puckett (born 1982), English filmmaker
- Dean Pullar (born 1973), Australian Olympic diver
- Dean Računica (born 1969), Croatian footballer
- Dean Rader (born 1967), American writer and professor
- Dean Radin, American parapsychologist
- Dean Rance (born 1991), English footballer
- Dean Rankine, Australian comics artist, writer and illustrator
- Dean Raper (born 1976), Australian rugby league footballer
- Dean L. Ray, US Army Air Force pilot
- Dean Ray, Australian singer and songwriter
- Dean Redman, British-born Canadian actor
- Dean Reed (1938–1986), American singer in East Germany
- Dean Refram (1936–1991), American golfer and golf course architect
- Dean Regas, American astronomer
- Dean Renfro (1932–2012), American football player
- Dean Reynolds (born 1963), English snooker player
- Dean Reynolds (darts player) (born 1992)
- Dean Rhoads (1935–2018), American politician
- Dean Rice (born 1968), Australian rules footballer
- Dean Richards, several people
- Dean Richmond (1804–1866), American railroad magnate
- Dean Riesner (1918–2002), American screenwriter
- Dean Rioli (born 1978), Australian rules footballer
- Dean Roberts (1975–2024), New Zealand musician and composer
- Dean Robertson (born 1970), Scottish professional golfer
- Dean Robinson (born 1968), Australian fitness coach
- Dean Robinson (cricketer) (born 1989), New Zealand cricketer
- Dean Rock (born 1990), Irish Gaelic footballer
- Dean Rockwell (1912–2005), American wrestler and coach
- Dean Roemmich, American oceanographer
- Dean Roland (born 1972), American musician and songwriter
- Dean Roper (1938–2001), American racing driver
- Dean Rosenthal (born 1974), American composer
- Dean Ross (footballer) (born 1955), Australian rules footballer
- Dean Ross, Canadian curler
- Dean Rudland, British DJ and compiler
- Dean Rummel, American politician
- Dean Rusk (1909–1994), U.S. Secretary of State
- Dean Russ (born 1986), Australian cricketer
- Dean Russell (born 1976), British politician
- Dean Ryan (born 1966), England international rugby league player
- Dean Sabatino (born 1962), American musician
- Dean Sampson (born 1967), Great Britain and England international rugby league footballer
- Dean Sanpei, American politician
- Dean Saunders, several people
- Dean Sayers (born 1954), Australian cricketer
- Dean Schamore (born 1968), American politician
- Dean Schifilliti (born 1968), Australian rugby league footballer
- Dean Schlabowske, American guitarist, singer and songwriter
- Dean Schmeichel (born 1973), Canadian wrestler
- Dean Schneider (born 1992), Swiss animal sanctuary founder and social media personality
- Dean Schofield (born 1979), English rugby player
- Dean Schrempp (born 1935), American politician
- Dean Scofield (born 1957), American actor
- Dean Semler (born 1943), Australian cinematographer and film director
- Dean Semmens (born 1979), Australian indigenous water polo player
- Dean Sensanbaugher (1925–2005), American football player
- Dean Sewell (photographer), Australian documentary photographer
- Dean Sewell (born 1972), Jamaican footballer
- Dean Seymour (born 1971), Canadian ice hockey player
- Dean Shek (1949–2021), Hong Kong film actor and producer
- Dean Shiels (born 1985), Northern Irish footballer
- Dean Shostak, American crystallophone player and vocalist
- Dean Sicking (born 1957), American inventor and safety researcher
- Dean Silvers, American film director
- Dean Simonton, American psychologist
- Dean Sinclair (born 1984), English footballer
- Dean F. Sittig (born 1961), US professor in Biomedical Informatics and Bioengineering
- Dean Skelos (born 1948), American politician
- Dean Skira (born 1962), Croatian lighting designer
- Dean Slaugh (1929–2009), American Paralympic archer
- Dean Slayton, American football player and coach
- Dean van der Sluys (born 1959), Dutch footballer
- Dean Smith, several people
- Dean Snedker (born 1994), English association football player
- Dean Snell, plastics engineer
- Dean Solomon (born 1980), Australian rules footballer
- Dean Solomons (born 1999), South African soccer player
- Dean Spade, American lawyer, writer and transgender activist
- Dean Spanos (born 1950), American football executive
- Dean Spink (born 1967), English footballer
- Dean Spratt (1952–2007), American traffic reporter
- Dean St Hilaire (born 1963), Trinidadian cricketer
- Dean Stalham, British artist, playwright and activist
- Dean Standing (born 1969), British motorcycle speedway rider
- Dean Starkey (born 1967), American pole vaulter
- Dean Steinkuhler (born 1961), American football player
- Dean T. Stevenson (1915–1994), American bishop
- Dean Steward (1923–1979), American football player
- Dean Stockwell (1936–2021), American actor
- Dean Stoecker (born 1956/1957), American billionaire, co-founder of Alteryx
- Dean Stokes (born 1970), English former footballer and manager
- Dean Stone (1930–2018), American baseball player
- Dean Stoneman (born 1990), British racing driver
- Dean Strauch (born 1966), Australian rules footballer
- Dean Strong (born 1985), Canadian ice hockey player
- Dean C. Strother (1908–2000), United States Air Force general
- Dean Sturgis (1892–1950), American baseball player
- Dean Sturridge (born 1973), English footballer
- Dean Sullivan (1955–2023), English actor
- Dean Sutherland (born 1954), American politician
- Dean Sylvester (born 1972), American ice hockey player
- Dean Takahashi (born 1964), American journalist
- Dean Takko (born 1950), American politician
- Dean Talafous (born 1953), American ice hockey player
- Dean S. Tarbell (1913–1999), American chemist
- Dean Tavoularis (1932–2026), American motion picture production designer of Greek descent
- Dean Taylor, several people
- Dean Terlich (born 1989), Australian rules footballer
- Dean Thackwray (1933–2003), American long-distance runner
- Dean Thomas, several people
- Dean Thompson, several people
- Dean Tighe (born 1966), Australian mechanic, engineer and race car driver
- Dean Tolson (born 1951), American basketball player
- Dean Torrence (born 1940), American musician, half of rock n' roll duo Jan and Dean
- Dean Towers (born 1990), Australian rules footballer
- Dean Tracy (born 1985), American cyclist
- Dean Tran, American politician
- Dean Trantalis (born 1953), American politician
- Dean Travers (born 1996), Caymanian alpine skier
- Dean Treanor (born 1947), American baseball player and coach
- Dean Treister (born 1975), Australian rugby league footballer
- Dean Trowse (1931–2005), Australian cricketer
- Dean Tuftin (born 1970), Canadian country music singer
- Dean Turner, several people
- Dean Urdahl (born 1949), American politician
- Dean Van Schoiack, American politician
- Dean Vegas (born 1976), Australian Elvis tribute artist and politician
- Dean Vetrock (born 1954), American racing driver
- Dean Vickerman (born 1971), Australian basketball coach
- Dean Wade (born 1996), American basketball player
- Dean Walling (born 1969), English-born Saint Kitts and Nevis footballer
- Dean Wallis (born 1969), Australian rules footballer
- Dean Walsh (born 1994), Irish former amateur boxer
- Dean Ward (bobsleigh) (born 1963), British bobsledder
- Dean Ward (screenwriter), American screenwriter and filmmaker
- Dean Wareham (born 1963), New Zealand-American musician
- Dean Warren, ice hockey official
- Dean Wasson (1930–2024), Canadian politician and public servant
- Dean Waugh (born 1969), Australian cricketer
- Dean Webb, musical artist
- Dean Weber (born 1962), American computer scientist
- Dean Wellins, American film director, storyboard artist, and screenwriter
- Dean Wells, several people
- Dean Wendt (born 1968), American actor
- Dean Werries (1926–2012), American businessman
- Dean West (born 1972), English footballer
- Dean Westlake (1960–2022), American politician
- Dean Whare (born 1990), New Zealand rugby player
- Dean Whipple (born 1938), American judge
- Dean White, several people
- Dean Whitehead (born 1982), English footballer
- Dean Whiteway (born 1944), Canadian politician
- Dean Wickliffe, New Zealand criminal and prison escapee
- Dean Widders (born 1979), Australian rugby league footballer
- Dean Wilkins (born 1962), English footballer
- Dean Wilkins (baseball) (born 1966), American baseball player
- Dean Wilkinson (born 1967), English comedy writer
- Dean Willeford (born 1944), American water polo player
- Dean Willey (born 1962), British weightlifter
- Dean Williams, several people
- Dean Wilson (golfer) (born 1969), American golfer
- Dean Windass (born 1969), English footballer
- Dean Windsor (born 1986), Australian professional racing cyclist
- Dean Wink (born 1944), Australian politician
- Dean Winnard (born 1989), British footballer
- Dean Winslow (born 1953), American physician and professor
- Dean Winstanley (born 1981), English darts player
- Dean Winter, Australian politician
- Dean Winters (born 1964), American actor
- Dean G. Witter (1887–1969), American businessman
- Dean Michael Wiwchar, Canadian hitman
- Dean Wolstenholme Sr. (1757–1837), English animal painter
- Dean Woodman (1928–2019), American businessman
- Dean Woods (1966–2022), Australian cyclist
- Dean Wooldridge (1913–2006), American aerospace engineer
- Dean Conant Worcester (1866–1924), American zoologist and ornithologist
- Dean Wright (born 1962), American film director
- Dean Wurzberger (born 1953), American soccer player and coach
- Dean Yates (born 1967), English footballer
- Dean Yeagle (born 1947), American animator and cartoonist
- Dean Yendall, Australian jockey
- Dean Young, several people
- Dean Zammit (born 1971), rugby player
- Dean Zanuck (born 1972), American film producer
- Dean Zayas (1938–2022), Puerto Rican actor, director and playwright
- Dean Zelinsky (born 1957), American guitar luthier
- Dean Zimmerman, several people
- Dean A. Zupancic, American sound engineer

=== People with Dean as a middle name ===
- Richard Dean Anderson, American actor
- James Dean Bradfield, lead singer of the Manic Street Preachers
- Alan Dean Foster, American science fiction writer
- William Dean Howells, American writer
- Jeffrey Dean Morgan, American actor
- Greg Dean Schmitz, American film journalist
- Harry Dean Stanton, American actor
- Elizabeth Dean Lail, American actress

=== People with Dean as a stage name ===
- Dean (South Korean singer), stage name of South Korean R&B singer-songwriter, rapper and record producer Kwon Hyuk ( Korean : 권혁)
- Dean Ambrose (born 1985), ring name of American professional wrestler Jonathan Good
- Dean Malenko (born 1960), ring name of American wrestler Dean Simon
- Dean Ween (born 1970), stage name of American guitarist Michael Melchiondo Jr.

== Fictional characters ==
- Dean Moriarty, character in Jack Kerouac's On the Road
- Dean Winchester, character on the show Supernatural
- Dean Walton, a fictional character in Degrassi: The Next Generation
- Dean Venture, character on the show The Venture Bros.
- Dean Thomas, a fictional character in the Harry Potter series
- Dean Forester, character on the show Gilmore Girls

== See also ==
- Dean (surname)
- Din (name)
