= Auten =

Auten is the surname of several people:

- Christine Auten (born 1969), American voice actress
- Dean G. Auten (1937–2026), American politician
- Harold Auten (1891–1964), British naval officer and Victoria Cross recipient
- Phil Auten (1840–1919), American business executive and co-owner of the Pittsburgh Pirates baseball team

== See also ==
- AUTEN-67, an autophagy-enhancing drug candidate
