= Definite Maybe =

Definite Maybe may refer to:

- "Definite Maybe", a 2009 song by Jonathan Fagerlund from Welcome to My World
- "Definite Maybe", a 1983 song by the Kinks from State of Confusion
- "A Definite Maybe", a 2005 song by Dean Tuftin
- "A Definite Maybe", a 2013 song by Indica
- The Definite Maybe, a 1997 film starring Josh Lucas

== See also ==
- Definitely Maybe (disambiguation)
