= Muhammad M. Hussain =

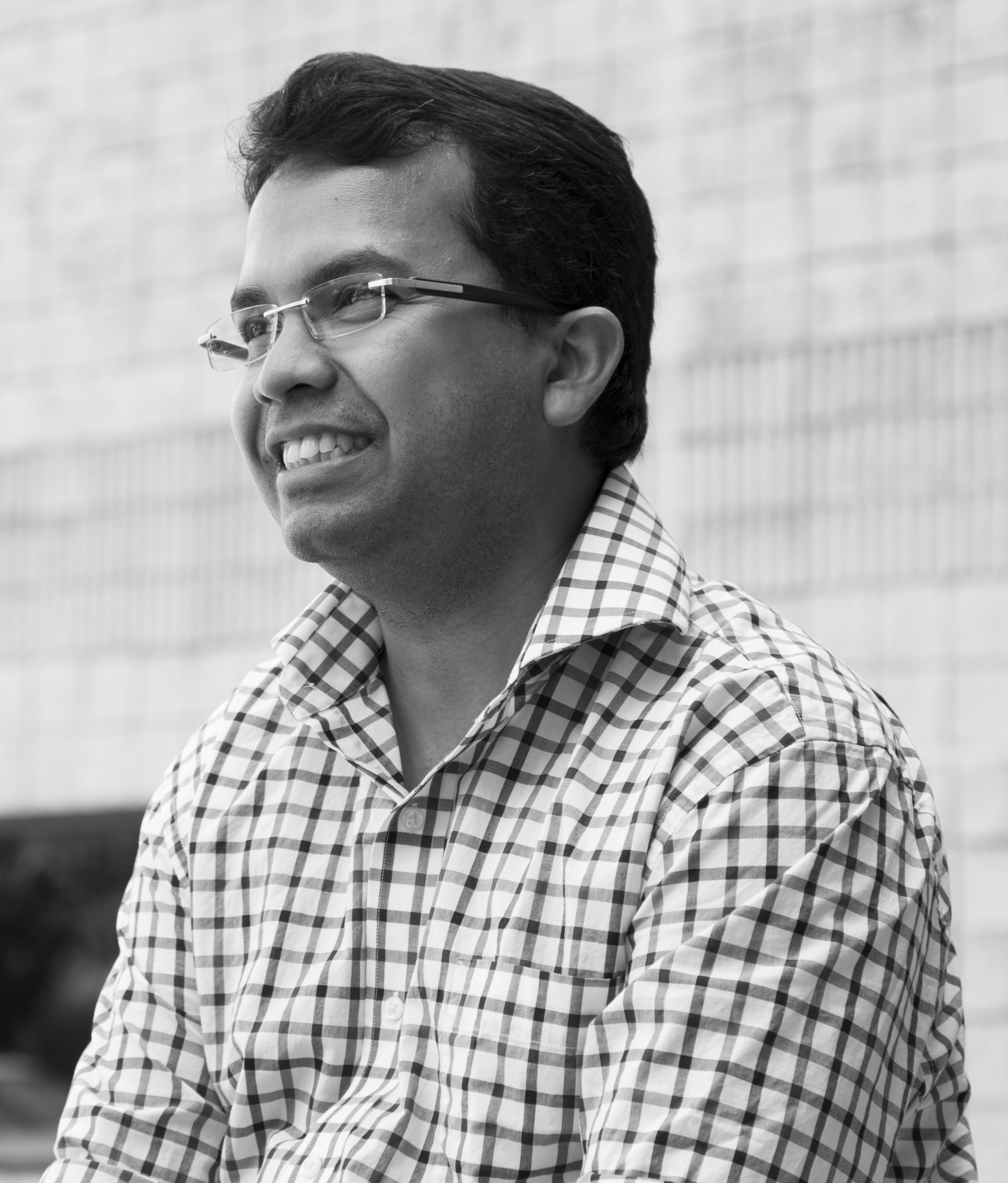
- Born: Dhaka, Bangladesh
- Education: Bangladesh University of Engineering and Technology; University of Texas at Austin
- Awards: Fellow, APS; Fellow, IEEE
- Scientific career
- Fields: Engineering
- Workplaces: KAUST
- Doctoral advisor: Baxter Womack, Dean Neikirk

Muhammad Mustafa Hussain is an electronics engineer specializing in CMOS technology-enabled low-cost flexible, stretchable and reconfigurable electronic systems. He was a professor in King Abdullah University of Science and Technology and University of California, Berkeley, and is a currently an electrical and computer engineering professor at Purdue University. He is the principal investigator (PI) at Integrated Nanotechnology Laboratory, and Integrated Disruptive Electronic Applications (IDEA) Laboratory. He is also the director of the Virtual Fab: vFabLab™ (https://vFabLab.org).

== Education and career ==
Born and brought up in Dhaka, Bangladesh, Hussain obtained his bachelor's degree in electrical and electronics engineering from the Bangladesh University of Engineering and Technology, in 2000. He completed his master's from University of Southern California in 2002 and joined University of Texas at Austin, where he completed another M.S. and doctoral degrees (December 2005). In 2006, he joined Texas Instruments as an integration engineer to lead the 22 nm node, non-planar, MugFET technology development. In 2008, he joined SEMATECH as the program manager of Novel Emerging Technology Program, where he oversaw CMOS technology development in Austin, Texas, and in Albany, New York. His program was supported by United States Defense Advanced Research Project Agency (DARPA). He joined the King Abdullah University of Science and Technology (KAUST) as a founding faculty in August 2009.

== Achievements ==
Hussain is the Fellow of IEEE, American Physical Society (APS), Institute of Physics (IOP), UK and Institute of Nanotechnology, UK. He serves as an editor in notable journals such as Applied Nanoscience (Springer-Nature) and IEEE Transactions on Electron Devices. He has been awarded the IEEE Electron Devices Society Distinguished Lecturer award for his teaching skills. His research on saliva based power generation, self-destructible electronics, paper skin, smart thermal patch, paper watch, multidimensional IC (MD-IC), corrugation enabled solar cells and decal electronics have garnered widespread international media attention. He has been a leading authority in the field of flexible inorganic electronics, in particular, through the flexible silicon process. He has also pioneered a new architecture for silicon transistors called the silicon Nanotube FET. He has served as the Editor-in-Chief for Handbook of Flexible and Stretchable Electronics.

== Awards and honors ==
- Edison Award Gold 2020 for Bluefin, "Personal Technology" category.
- Best Innovation Award in CES 2020 for Bluefin, "Tech for a better World" category.
- Fellow of World Technology Network and finalist in Health and Medicine, World Technology Network Award, 2016.
- Outstanding Young Texas Exes Award, 2015. (The University of Texas at Austin Alumni Award)
- Scientific American Top 10 World Changing Ideas, 2014.
- DOW Chemical Sustainability and Innovation Challenge Award 2012 for invention of Thermoelectric Windows, 2012.
