= Dean Coleman =

Dean Coleman may refer to:

- Dean Coleman (footballer)
- Dean Coleman (rugby union)
