= Din Joe =

Din Joe is an Irish nickname. Notable people with the nickname include:

- Din Joe Buckley (1919–2009), Irish hurler
- Din Joe Crowley (1945–2016), Irish Gaelic footballer

== See also ==
- Din (name)
- Joe (given name)
