= Deaner =

== As a surname ==
Notable people with this surname include:

- Chris Deaner, American musician, filmmaker, and programmer
- Cody Deaner (born 1981), ring-name of Chris Gray, Canadian wrestler
- Jacqueline Deaner (born 1979), American beauty-pageant winner

=== Other ===
Deaner is also the nickname of American guitarist and co-founder of Ween, Mickey Melchiondo, also known as Dean Ween.

=== See also ===
- Dean (given name)
- Dean (surname)
- Deanery
