= Dean Wells =

Dean Wells may refer to:

- Dean Wells (American football) (1970–2025), American football player
- Dean Wells (English footballer) (born 1985), English footballer
- Dean Wells (politician) (born 1949), Australian politician
- Dean Faulkner Wells (1936–2011), American author, editor and publisher

== See also ==
- Dean of Wells
