= Faux Faulkner contest =

The Faux Faulkner contest was an annual parody essay contest founded in 1989 by Dean Faulkner Wells, niece of Nobel laureate William Faulkner, with her husband Lawrence Wells, and sponsored by Yoknapatawpha Press and the Center for the Study of Southern Culture. It was held 16 times until 2005. The contest attracted as many as 750 entries in a single year from several countries as well as each of the 50 United States. The winners were published annually in Hemispheres magazine (the onboard magazine for United Airlines and the contest's corporate sponsor) and often received coverage in other major media outlets such as USA Today and MSNBC. The contest has been on hold since 2005 while it seeks a new corporate sponsor.

The objective of the contest is to create the best entry to parody William Faulkner's uniquely artistic style of writing, his themes, his plots, or his characters, in a short-short story of 500 words or fewer.
