= Martin Dean =

Martin Dean may refer to:

- Martin C. Dean (born 1962), research scholar at the Center for Advanced Holocaust Studies
- Martin R. Dean (born 1955), Swiss writer
- Martin Dean (actor) (born 1947), American actor known for Ensign O'Toole (1962)

== See also ==
- Dean Martin (disambiguation)
