= Dean Gould =

World record holder

Dean Gould (born 15 September 1964 in Ipswich) holds records that recognise dexterity and memory. He is known for beermat flipping, coin snatching, and recalling from memory all 712 survivors' names from the sinking of the RMS Titanic.

Gould has appeared on television shows including BBC's Television Show, Record Breakers and The Real Little Britain.

Gould attended Deben High School, Felixstowe, Suffolk. Dean married his wife Natalie in 1988. They have three children.
