= Dean Marney =

Dean Marney may refer to:

- Dean Marney (author) (born 1952), children's book author
- Dean Marney (footballer) (born 1984), English footballer
