= Definitely Maybe (disambiguation) =

Definitely Maybe is a 1994 album by Oasis.

Definitely Maybe may also refer to:

== Film and literature ==
- Definitely, Maybe, a 2008 film by Adam Brooks
- Definitely Maybe (novel), a 1974 science fiction novel by Arkady and Boris Strugatsky
- Definitely Maybe, a 1998 Audley Memorial Hospital novel by Caroline Anderson
- "Definitely, Maybe", a 2011 Lucy Valentine short story by Heather Webber

== Music ==
- Definitely Maybe, an album by Ampie du Preez
- "Definitely Maybe", a song by Ed Palermo Big Band, 2017
- "Definitely Maybe", a song by FM Static from What Are You Waiting For?, 2003
- "Definitely Maybe", a song by the Jeff Beck Group from Jeff Beck Group, 1972

== See also ==
- Definite Maybe (disambiguation)
