= Dean Morgan (disambiguation) =

Dean Morgan is a Montserratian footballer.

Dean Morgan may also refer to:

== People ==
- Dean Morgan (bowls) (born 1970), English international lawn and indoor bowler
- Dean Morgan (cricketer) (born 1981), Jamaican cricketer
- Dean Morgan, founder of Dean Morgan K. K., now the Rosetta Stone Learning Center chain of schools in Japan

== Schools ==
- Dean Morgan Junior High School, Casper, Wyoming, United States
