= Dean White =

Dean White may refer to:

- Dean White (basketball) (1923–1992), American basketball player
- Dean White (businessman) (1923–2016), American billionaire
- Dean White (director), American television director and producer
- Dean White (footballer) (born 1958), English former footballer
- Dean White (comics), comic book colorist on One More Day (comics) etc.
