= Dean Williams =

Dean Williams may refer to:

- Dean Williams (squash player) (born 1956), retired squash player from Australia
- Dean Williams (footballer, born 1970), English football striker
- Dean Williams (footballer, born 1972), English football goalkeeper
- Dean Williams (basketball) (born 1977), British basketball player
- Dean Williams (cricketer) (born 1980), English cricketer
