= Dean Clarke =

Dean Clarke may refer to:

- Alured Clarke (priest), Dean of Exeter
- Dean Clarke (footballer, born 1977), English footballer
- Dean Clarke (Irish footballer) (born 1993), Irish footballer

== See also ==
- Dean Clark (disambiguation)
