= Dean Farnham =

Australian rules footballer

Personal information
- Full name: Dean Farnham
- Born: 18 August 1950 (age 76)
- Height: 206 cm (6 ft 9 in)
- Weight: 115 kg (254 lb)
- Position: Ruckman

Playing career^{1}
Years	Club	Games (Goals)
1968–73	Central District (SANFL)	80 (22)
1974–75	Fitzroy (VFL)	17 (4)

Representative team honours
Years	Team	Games (Goals)
?	South Australia	3 (2)
- ^{1} Playing statistics correct to the end of 1980.

Dean Farnham is a former Australian rules footballer, who played for the Central District Football Club in the South Australian National Football League (SANFL) and the Fitzroy Football Club in the Victorian Football League (VFL).
