= Dean Howes =

American sports manager

- Born: Dean Lynn Howes Jr. October 7, 1952 (age 73)
- Spouse: Catherine Nelson Howes
- Children: 4

Dean L. Howes Jr. (born October 7, 1952) is an American businessman in the field of sports management. He was the first commissioner of Major League Rugby which began its inaugural season in 2018.

A former partner in SCP Worldwide, Howes was previously chief executive of Real Salt Lake, a member of Major League Soccer. Howes was also, with SCP Worldwide, a managing partner of National Hockey League franchise St. Louis Blues.

== Early career ==
Howes began with pharmaceutical company Bristol-Myers Squibb (BMS) in a 19-year business career spanning New York, Chicago, and Los Angeles, rising to the position of Senior Director of Business Development. He left BMS in 1997 to become CEO and founding executive of Professional Teams Physicians. The company grew to represent over a thousand sports medicine practitioners around the country, across professional teams in the NBA, MLB, NFL, MLS and NHL.

== Sports management ==
Howes became a partner in SCP Worldwide (Sports Capital Partners), a New York City-based sports, entertainment and media company founded in 2002. Howes and SCP Worldwide were managing partners of National Hockey League (NHL) team St. Louis Blues and their home arena the Savvis Center (since renamed the Scottrade Center).

He was appointed chief executive of the Real Salt Lake soccer franchise, a Major League Soccer (MLS) team owned by SCP playing in Salt Lake City, Utah. He later served as the vice-chairman and oversaw the construction of Rio Tinto Stadium, the 20,000-seat home of Real Salt Lake in Sandy, Utah.

Howes played a role in making Real Salt Lake the first U.S. professional sports team to sell the naming rights to the front of their jerseys. This sparked a trend throughout the MLS, in which now all teams have followed suit with front jersey sponsors.

In 2014, Howes partnered with Findlay Entertainment in their bid to bring another major sports franchise to the Las Vegas market. He joined the executive management team of Rugby Utah in 2016, before being appointed as the commissioner of Major League Rugby ahead of the competition's inaugural 2018 season.

== Community service ==
Howes has served on the board of directors for the Salt Lake chapter of community organisation United Way. He was a mission president and ecclesiastical leader of about 200 of the LDS Church missionaries in central Arizona between 2010 and 2013.
