= Dean Williams (cricketer) =

English cricketer (born 1980)

Personal information
- Full name: Dean Ross Williams
- Born: 8 December 1980 (age 45); Barrow-in-Furness, Cumbria, England
- Batting: Right-handed
- Role: Wicket-keeper

Domestic team information
- Years: Team
- 2001–2006: Cumberland

Career statistics
Competition	List A
Matches	2
Runs scored	20
Batting average	10.00
100s/50s	–/–
Top score	16
Balls bowled	–
Wickets	–
Bowling average	–
5 wickets in innings	–
10 wickets in match	–
Best bowling	–
Catches/stumpings	2/–
- Source: Cricinfo, 27 March 2011

Dean Ross Williams (born 8 December 1980) is an English cricketer. Williams is a right-handed batsman who plays as a wicket-keeper. He was born in Barrow-in-Furness, Cumbria.

Williams made his debut for Cumberland in the 2001 MCCA Knockout Trophy against the Lancashire Cricket Board. His Minor Counties Championship debut came in the same season against Norfolk, with Williams playing Minor counties cricket for Cumberland to 2006. In his time with Cumberland, Williams played two List A matches against the Warwickshire Cricket Board the 1st round of the 2002 Cheltenham & Gloucester Trophy which was held in 2001, and against Scotland in the 1st round of the 2004 Cheltenham & Gloucester Trophy which was held in 2003. In his two List A matches, he scored 20 runs at a batting average of 10, with a high score of 16.
