= Dean Johnson =

Dean Johnson may refer to:

- Dean Johnson (politician) (born 1947), American politician & academic administrator
- Dean Johnson (entertainer) (1961–2007), American entertainer
- Dean Edward Johnson (born 1950), American jurist & academic
- The police shooting of 17-year-old Dean Johnson at the beginning of the 1968 Democratic National Convention protests
