= Dean Clarke (footballer, born 1977) =

English footballer

Personal information
- Full name: Dean Clarke
- Date of birth: 28 July 1977 (age 49)
- Place of birth: Hereford, England
- Position: Midfielder

Senior career*
Years	Team	Apps	(Gls)
1993–1996	Hereford United	11	(0)
1996–1997	Cheltenham Town	35	(0)
1998	Merthyr Tydfil	40	(0)
1998–2000	Newport County	59	(3)
2000–2002	Merthyr Tydfil	79	(1)
2002–2003	Barry Town	4	(0)
2003–2005	Merthyr Tydfil	38	(0)
2004	→ Westfields (loan)	?	(?)
2005–2007	Bath City	48	(1)
2007–2010	Merthyr Tydfil	?	(?)
2011–2012	Newbridge-On Wye F.C.		
- Merthyr Town

Managerial career
- 2021–2022: Merthyr Town
- * Club domestic league appearances and goals

Dean Clarke (born 28 July 1977 in Hereford) is a former footballer who started his career for Hereford United, before moving on to Cheltenham town, Merthyr Town, Newport county, Bath city. He went on to make over 500 southern league appearances and gaining 4 promotions.

Dean started his career at Hereford United as a YTS player making his debut on the last day of the 1993–94 season against Doncaster Rovers.

On 30 January 2021, Clarke was appointed as manager of Southern Football League club Merthyr Town. On the 13th February 2022 Merthyr Town parted ways with Clarke, with the club languishing in the relegation zone of the Southern Premier League South Division.
