= Dean Richards =

Dean Richards may refer to:

- Dean Richards (rugby union) (born 1963), English rugby union player and coach
- Dean Richards (footballer) (1974–2011), English footballer
- Dean Richards (reporter) (born 1954), Chicago TV reporter
