= Dean Omori =

British musician and writer (born 1968)

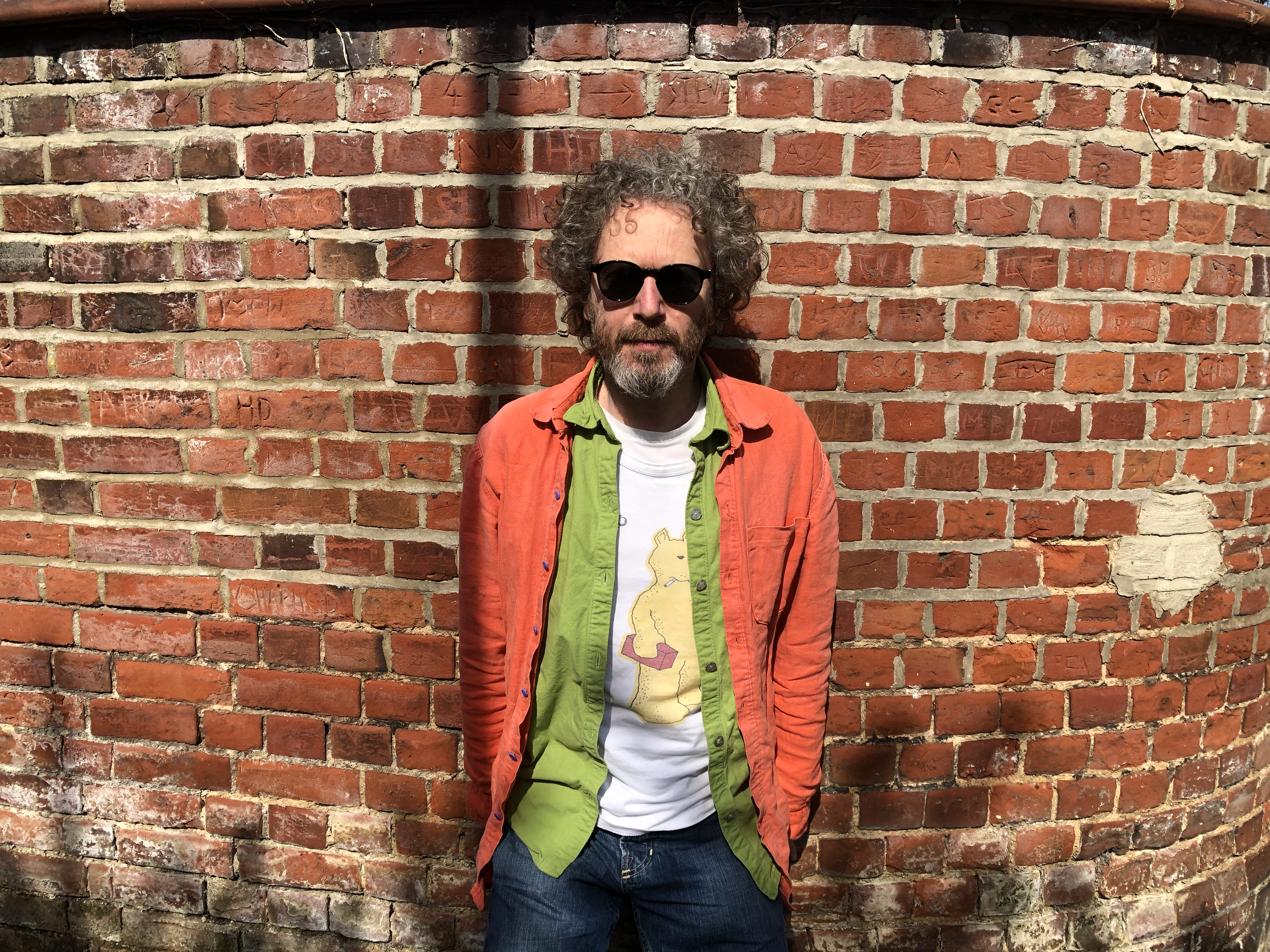
- Born: Dean Francis Bedwell; 5 July 1968 (age 58)
- Occupations: Singer; songwriter; poet; artist; producer
- Years active: 1993–present
- Spouse: Rachel Omori
- Children: Two
- Musical career
- Genres: Alternative; acoustic; jazz; tango; protest
- Instruments: Vocals; guitar; rhythm
- Label: The Art Of Protest
- Website: www.deanomori.com

Dean Omori (born Dean Francis Bedwell, 5 July 1968) is an English singer-songwriter, poet and producer. Omori is the Japanese word for "big forest".

His work addresses human rights, war, environment, prejudice and philosophical issues. Omori is the founder of The Art of Protest, an organisation set up to encourage protest through art and music.

== Music and film ==
In 2006, Omori wrote the songs that would eventually make up his first album Ten War Songs. In the following years wrote, performed and produced 14 albums and began making short films to accompany his music. In 2008 the World Wide Fund for nature (WWF) awarded him best film and music for How Can You Sleep.

In 2010, Omori was discovered by Malcolm Holmes of OMD and signed to the label Fin Music. His music and film Censorship Burns The Books Nobody Reads was used by Freemuse to help support their cause, highlighting the persecution of artists and musicians around the world.

In 2011, he was invited to write the music celebrating Amnesty International's 50th year, which was released in May and has toured supporting their cause. In 2016, his album 'Got Daddy Gone' was written for War Child to draw attention to the ongoing war in Syria.

In 2013, he left his record company to independently release a new album Sean Penn. After the split he has remained an independent artist with full control to write, perform, produce and record all of his material.

== Albums ==
- Tough Day Without FLowers - 2025
- 25,00 Mile Song - 2024
- Street - 2023
- Post Original - 2022
- Whole Cowardly Bundle of Art - 2021
- 11th Commandment - 2020
- Just is - 2019
- Witness and Testify - 2018
- Music for an Unknown Revolution - 2017
- Got Daddy Gone - 2016
- The Heroin View - 2015
- Holocaust and the Whale - 2014
- Sean Penn - 2013
- I Can Save the World - 2012
- Words of Freedom - 2011
- List of My Demands - 2010
- The Immortal Death of Samuel Escobar - 2009
- I Want to be Pregnant - 2008
- Squaw - 2007
- Ten War Songs - 2006
