= Dean Martin (disambiguation) =

Dean Martin (1917–1995) was an American singer, actor, television personality and comedian.

Dean Martin may also refer to:

- Dean Martin (disc jockey), English disc jockey on the Gold network
- Dean Martin (footballer, born 1972), English footballer
- Dean Martin (footballer, born 1957), English footballer
- Dean Martin (politician), former Arizona State Treasurer, 2007–2011
- Dean Paul Martin (1951–1987), American entertainer, son of the singer
- Andrew D. Martin, formerly a dean of a college in the University of Michigan
- Dan Martin (drama educator), dean of a college in Carnegie Mellon University
- Kelsey Martin, formerly a dean of a college in the University of California
- "Dean Martin" (song), a song by Something for Kate

== See also ==
- Martin Dean (disambiguation)
