= Dean Saunders (disambiguation) =

Dean Saunders (born 1964) is a Welsh football player and manager.

Dean Saunders may also refer to:

- Dean Saunders (singer) (born 1981), Dutch singer
- Dean Saunders (politician), American politician from Florida
