= Dean Notting =

Australian rules footballer

Personal information
- Full name: Dean Notting
- Born: 14 January 1966 (age 60)
- Original team: Lake Boga
- Height: 182 cm (6 ft 0 in)
- Weight: 76 kg (168 lb)

Playing career^{1}
Years	Club	Games (Goals)
1985–1987	Richmond	28 (17)
- ^{1} Playing statistics correct to the end of 1987.

Dean Notting (born 14 January 1966) is a former Australian rules footballer who played with Richmond in the Victorian Football League (VFL).

== Career ==
Notting, a recruit from Lake Boga, first broke into the Richmond team late in the 1985 VFL season, to make two league appearances. In his first game of the 1986 season, Richmond's round four win over North Melbourne, Notting received a Brownlow Medal vote, then had his best performance a week later with five goals against St Kilda at the MCG. He finished the season with 13 appearances, a tally he matched in 1987, his final season. His 28 career games is a record for a player wearing number 58.
