= Dean Duperron =

Canadian businessman

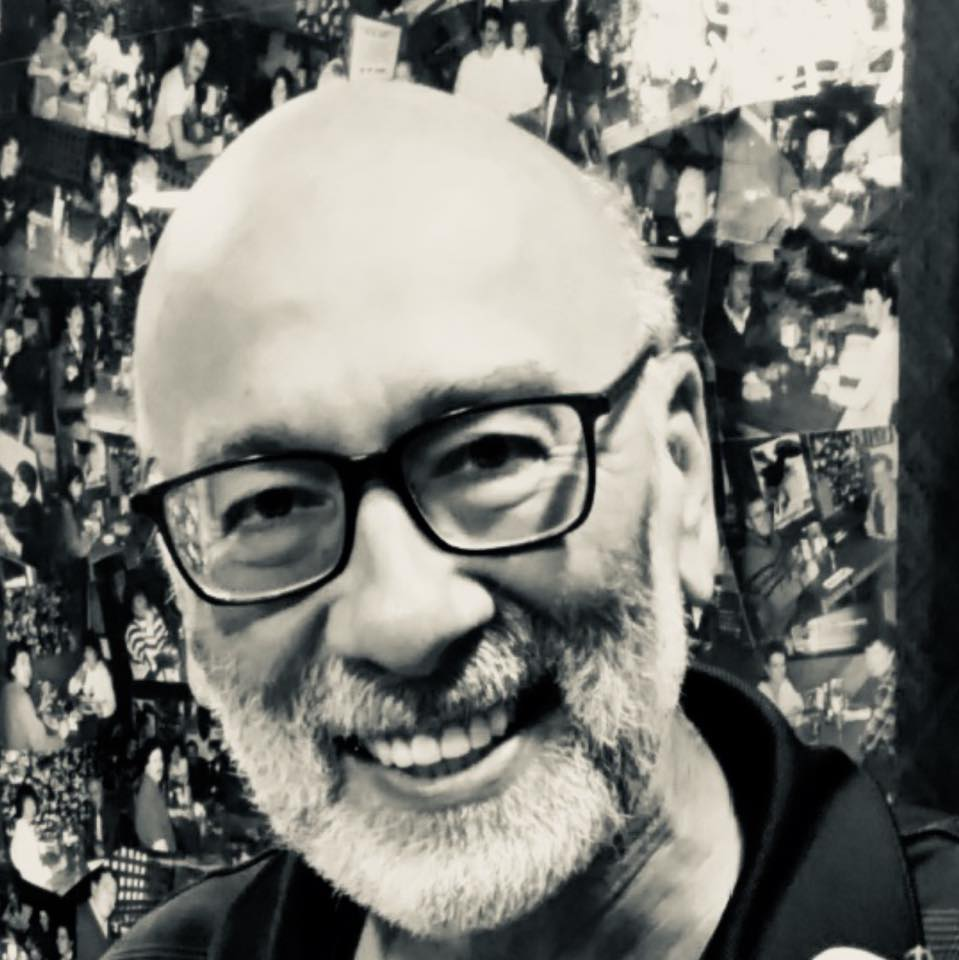
Chevalier Dean Duperron, RSA Fellow

Dean Duperron, Chevalier, RSA Fellow is a Canadian businessman. He is the president and chief executive of The Duperron Group, a real estate investment firm that also provides business mentorship to young entrepreneurs, and educational development. Since the early 1990s, Duperron has been a real estate investor, originally purchasing single-family dwellings and later moving to multi-family homes in both Canada and the United States.

The Duperron Group is presently investing in Post-Secondary Colleges and Real Estate and owns several real estate holdings, including a 28-unit multifamily apartment building in British Columbia. They also owned and operated a multi-building, multi-family apartment complex in Houston, Texas, as well as several single and dual family homes.

== The Duperron Group ==
The Duperron Group has been involved in real estate for decades going back to first purchasing a 5-year-old split-level home in Coquitlam which he converted into a triplex. From there a variety of real estate investments including a co-op housing project that was converted into a strata property, quadrupling its value. Later, an apartment complex was purchased in Langley. In 2012, The Duperron Group purchased 39 apartment buildings in Houston with the Canadian dollar at par to the USA dollar and sold the buildings in 2015 profiting from a 30% drop in the value Canadian dollar. These transactions among others have made real estate a successful part of The Duperron Group’s portfolio.

The Duperron Group's operations include trades, retail, wholesale, real estate investing, market investing, party and event planning, and mentoring entrepreneurs. The organization has provided training in subjects including trade skills, electrical, heavy equipment operators, construction, hospitality, health careers, nursing, pharmacy, and business. The Duperron Group has received recognition from provincial and federal governments. Its credentialing includes programs ranging from certificates to Master's Degrees.

The Duperron Group of Schools today includes an online university, hospitality institutes, a heavy equipment school, ESL schools, horticulture and various business programs throughout our member schools. The Duperron Group is actively investing in post-secondary colleges in North America.

The Duperron Group purchased and built a successful medical clinic in Mission, B.C. Partnering with a young aboriginal doctor who had applied and been accepted through the MD Aboriginal Admissions program at UBC (of which Mr. Duperron was a committee member) 12 years earlier, the young doctor and Dean reopened a clinic in Wal-Mart which had been closed for 2.5 years and at a time when three other clinics in Mission closed, the Gwaii Medical Clinic blossomed. After two years, the clinic was sold to the young doctor and thrives to this day.

The Duperron Group is also an investment firm with a focus on Private Post-Secondary Education and Real Estate investment, particularly Multi-Family Apartment buildings.

== Sprott-Shaw Community College ==
Duperron, previously the president and CEO of Sprott-Shaw Community College. After purchasing, with a partner, the educational institution in 1991, which consisted of one classroom with 26 students. During his tenure, he led the growth to 24 campuses in British Columbia, as well as multiple international schools, and was key to Sprott-Shaw being the first private college to confer degree programs in that province. Duperron also spearheaded the innovative Class Act scholarship program.

=== Class Act Canada ===
Class Act Canada is a program that was devised to showcase British Columbia as the best place to live and learn. The Class Act scholarship program challenged entrants to upload a 60-90 second video. They focused on "What would I do to improve my community with a degree or a diploma from Sprott-Shaw College". The 10 winning students came from countries that included Peru, Ukraine, India, Korea, Philippines and Canada, and were selected by judges. That was after more than 7.7 million votes were cast worldwide between September and December 2009.

== Industry Board Positions ==
Duperron currently serves on the Residential Construction Industry Training of British Columbia (RCITO) board and on the executive board, as the treasurer, of the Professional Builders Institute of British Columbia (PBIBC). PBIBC's mission is to "increase the professionalism of residential building, through education, training, and certification. They collaborate with BC Housing to develop a recommendation and process for minimum qualification standards required for certification and licensing". RCITO defines the overall industry training needs in British Columbia, establishes training and occupational standards, promotes training programs, quantifies training results, and sponsors new apprentices. RCITO specifically concentrates on five industries in the residential construction sector that include new home building and renovation; log and timber building; forced air, hydronic and geothermal residential heating; aboriginal housing; and residential maintenance. Duperron has served on this board as the chair of the accreditation committee for over 10 years.
