= Dean Hubbard =

American musician (1953–2018)

Dean W. Hubbard (July 21, 1953 – March 11, 2018) was an American musician and professional trombonist. Key credits include the later development of the "voice" of the teacher (the SF Symphony’s Will Sudmeier originated the trombone “voice” in the original cartoons), “Ms. Othmar,” on the Charlie Brown Peanuts cartoon and TV specials. He also played with Dizzy Gillespie, Perry Como, Art Pepper, Nelson Riddle, Ella Fitzgerald, Natalie Cole, Peggy Lee, Aaron Neville, Buddy Morrow, Tony Bennett and the SF Orchestra, among others. He is featured on the Gold and Platinum records for Linda Ronstadt's Cry Like a Rainstorm, Howl Like the Wind. He was a lifetime member of the SF Musicians Union and a music instructor

== Early life ==
Dean Hubbard was born in Oakland, California in 1953. He attended Pacific High School in San Leandro. He came from a musical family, often hearing his grandfather play the accordion and his sister play the cello and double bass. Hubbard began playing the trombone in middle school. Versed in all brass, his fondness for the trombone lasted for a lifetime. Coincidentally, his wife, Constance Hubbard, had also played trombone as a middle school and high school student, but made a career in school administration.

== Career ==
Dean Hubbard's career spanned over 50 years. His early career includes performance work with music standards including Perry Como, Dean Martin, Ella Fitzgerald, Natalie Cole, Peggy Lee, Aaron Neville, Buddy Morrow, Tony Bennett, Joe Strummer and Carol Channing. In addition to audience performance work, he also recorded hundreds of jingles for Chevy, Honda, Hershey's, Hewlett Packard, Rice-a-Roni, and more.

In the mid-1970s through 1990, Hubbard performed on The Charlie Brown and Snoopy Show and all of the Peanuts television specials, including This is America, Charlie Brown, and others. Notably, Hubbard further developed the "wah-wah" voice of the teacher in Peanuts, “Miss Othmar” (the technique was first originated by Will Sudmeier for the original cartoon productions). "Additionally, Hubbard performed regularly on Garfield and Friends during the first four seasons until the show transitioned to synthesizer sounds and music.

Hubbard also performed with the San Francisco Orchestra and on stage for theater productions in San Francisco. He also performed in several long-standing shows, such as Teatro Zinzanni and others.

In addition to his performance work, Hubbard was a "Master Artist" and Conn-Selmer Clinician. He also provided instruction for children and experienced musicians. He is cited by professional trombonist, Alan Ferber, as inspiring Ferber's music career with the introduction of a Jamey Aebersold play-along. As Ferber said, "A feeling of joyful disbelief washed over me as I listened and watched...Perhaps a combination of his trombone sound, the ease with which he phrased and moved through the registers, his note choices…whatever it was, it changed the course of my life. I always think about that moment when I hear the phrase, “you don’t choose music, it chooses you.”"

== Discography ==
Year	Album	Artist	
2016	Storming Through the South	Stan Kenton & His Orchestra	Trombone
2006	Paris Blues	Raquel Bitton	Trombone
2006	Remembering Sophie Tucker	Pat Yankee	Trombone
2005	Three Crosses	Walkin by Faith	Member of Attributed Artist, Vocals, Guitar, Banjo, Mandolin
2002	Dream a Little Dream	Raquel Bitton	Trombone
1999	Jerry's Girls [Original Cast Recording]		Trombone
1996	Blue Gold	Kryon	Trombone
1992	A Cryin' Shame	Cleo Laine	Trombone
1989	Cry Like a Rainstorm - Howl Like the Wind	Linda Ronstadt	Trombone
1987	Walker [Original Soundtrack]	Joe Strummer	Trombone
