= Dean Alexander =

American country music singer

- Born: Nashville, Tennessee, United States
- Genres: Country
- Occupation: Singer-songwriter
- Instrument: Vocals
- Years active: 2006-present
- Label: Elektra

Dean Alexander is an American country music singer.

Alexander first worked as a landscaper for Barbara Orbison, wife of Roy Orbison, who offered him his first publishing deal.

In 2006, Alexander moved to Nashville, Tennessee where Darren Theriault, who played bass guitar for Jypsi, invited him to perform at Layla's Bluegrass Inn. Alexander then became a regular performer there.

Alexander released his debut single, "Live a Little", through Elektra Records in mid-2014. He wrote the song with Laura Veltz and co-produced it with Justin Weaver.

Taste of Country reviewed the single favorably, saying that "Lyrically, ‘Live a Little’ is quick and clever, with Alexander's voice flowing through the lyrics like a spark that will grab the listener's attention and have them hitting repeat as they find themselves inspired and motivated to jump headfirst into their dreams." Got Country Online also praised the song, comparing it favorably to Dwight Yoakam and Chris Isaak.

The song debuted at number 53 on the Country Airplay chart dated for August 9, 2014.

After Elektra closed, Alexander released a second single titled "Different Kind of Same" in 2019.

== Discography ==
=== Singles ===
| Year | Single | Peak positions |
| Year | Single | US Country Airplay |
|---|---|---|
| 2014 | "Live a Little" | 50 |

=== Music videos ===
| Year | Video | Director |
|---|---|---|
| 2014 | "Live a Little" | |
