= Dean Murray =

Dean Murray may refer to:

- L. Dean Murray (born 1964), American member of the New York State Assembly
- Dean Murray (basketball) (born 1964), basketball coach
