= Dean Edwards (disambiguation) =

Dean Edwards (born 1970) is an American stand-up comedian and actor.

Dean Edwards may also refer to:

- Dean Edwards (footballer) (born 1962), former football forward
- Dean Edwards, developer of the IE7 JavaScript Library and the cssQuery JavaScript function, etc
