= Dean Clark =

Dean Clark may refer to:

- Dean Clark (American football) (born 2001), American football player
- Dean Clark (ice hockey) (born 1964), ice hockey player and manager
- Dean Clark (footballer) (born 1980), semi-pro footballer for Northwood F.C. and currently Slough Town F.C.
- Dean Clark (rugby league) (born 1968), former New Zealand international

== See also ==
- Dean Clarke (disambiguation)
