= Dean Barrett =

American writer

- Born: 1942 (age 83–84); New London, Connecticut, U.S.
- Education: University of Hawaiʻi
- Occupations: Novelist; writer; playwright
- Writing career
- Genre: Mystery fiction
- Website: deanbarrettmystery.com

Dean Barrett (born 1942 in New London, Connecticut) is an American novelist, mystery writer and playwright. Most of his writing takes place in Asia, especially China and Thailand.

== Background ==
After graduating from university, Barrett joined the Army Security Agency and was trained as a Chinese translator. He served in Thailand and Taiwan with the 83rd RRSOU (Radio Research Special Operations Unit) during the Vietnam War. He then earned a master's degree in Asian Studies from the University of Hawaiʻi.

Barrett has made his home in Asia for more than 40 years, mostly in Hong Kong and Thailand. His writing on Asian themes has won him several awards, including the South Asia award for best play on the BBC Overseas Playwrights contest and the PATA Grand Prize for Excellence.

== Writing ==
Barrett is the author of several novels set in Asia - Memoirs of a Bangkok Warrior; Hangman's Point (Hong Kong); Kingdom of Make-Believe (Thailand); Skytrain to Murder (Thailand); "Identity Theft" (Thailand and Florida), A Love Story: The China Memoirs of Thomas Rowley (1862 China).

A mystery novel set in New York City, Murder in China Red, features a Chinese detective from Beijing. Barrett has also written a humorous travel book on China, Don Quixote in China: The Search for Peach Blossom Spring.

His latest books are Murder at the Horny Toad Bar & Other Outrageous Tales of Thailand and The Go Go Dancer Who Stole My Viagra and Other Poetic Tragedies of Thailand. Dragon Slayer is a book with three novellas on Chinese themes. His novel entitled, Permanent Damage is a sequel to Skytrain to Murder, a detective novel set in Thailand starring Scott Sterling. Several of Barrett's novels have been optioned for film. His latest novel is Pop Darrell's Last Case, a detective novel set in New York City but involving Chinese themes.

Barrett's plays have been performed in nine countries and his musical, Fragrant Harbour, set in 1857 Hong Kong, was selected by the National Alliance for Musical Theater to be staged on 42nd Street.

He wrote a satirical column for the Hong Kong Standard for five years under the name Uncle Yum Cha ("Uncle Drink Tea"). Barrett is one of the contributors to the highly successful Bangkok Noir, along with John Burdett, Stephen Leather, Christopher Moore and others. He has finished writing Thieves Hamlet, a sequel to Hangman's Point, also set in Hong Kong and southern China in 1857.
