= Dean Smith (disambiguation) =

Dean Smith (1931–2015) was an American college basketball coach.

Dean Smith may also refer to:

== Politics ==
- Dean Smith (Australian politician) (born 1969), Australian senator
- Dean Smith (Canadian politician) (1928–2010), political figure in British Columbia, Canada

== Sports ==
- Dean Smith (sprinter) (1932–2023), American Olympic track and field athlete, actor, and stuntman
- Dean Barton-Smith (born 1967), Australian former decathlete
- Dean Smith (footballer, born 1971), English football player and, most recently, coach of Charlotte FC
- Dean Smith (footballer, born 1958) (1958–2009), English football player for Leicester City and Brentford
- Dean Smith (racing driver) (born 1988), British racing driver

== Other people ==
- Dean Smith (pilot) (1899–1987), American airmail pilot
- Dean Smith (engineer), Walter Byers Award winner
- Dean Smith (actor) (born 1990), starred in Waterloo Road
- Dean Wesley Smith (born 1950), science fiction author
- Dean Smith, title character of the Lucky Luke adventure published in French in 1976 as L'Empereur Smith, and in English in 2010 as Emperor Smith
