= Dean Craven =

English footballer

Personal information
- Date of birth: 17 February 1979 (age 47)
- Place of birth: Shrewsbury, England
- Height: 5 ft 6 in (1.68 m)
- Position: Midfielder

Senior career*
Years	Team	Apps	(Gls)
1997–2000	Shrewsbury Town	11	(0)
2000	Merthyr Tydfil		
2000	Newtown		
2000–2001	Stafford Rangers		
2001–2002	Hednesdord Town	17	(0)
2002–2003	Bridgnorth Town		
2003–2004	Hereford United	10	(0)
2004	→ Grantham Town (loan)	5	(0)
2004–2007	AFC Telford United	110	(10)
2007–2008	Witton Albion		
2008–2009	Hednesford Town	2	(0)
- * Club domestic league appearances and goals

Dean Craven (born 17 February 1979) is a footballer who played as a midfielder for Shrewsbury Town in the Football League.
