= Dean Russ =

Australian cricketer (born 1986)

Personal information
- Full name: Dean Jeffrey Russ
- Born: 4 March 1986 (age 40)
- Batting: Left-handed
- Role: Wicket-Keeper

Domestic team information
- Years: Team
- 2013-14: Victoria
- FC debut: 3–6 March 2014 Victoria v Tasmania

Career statistics
Competition	FC
Matches	2
Runs scored	77
Batting average	25.66
100s/50s	0/0
Top score	47
Balls bowled	-
Wickets	-
Bowling average	-
5 wickets in innings	-
10 wickets in match	-
Best bowling	-
Catches/stumpings	1/–
- Source: , 26 August 2022

Dean Jeffrey Russ (born 4 March 1986) is an Australian former first class cricketer for the Victoria state cricket team. He was a left-handed batsman and wicket-keeper.

== Career ==
A left-hand opening batsman, Russ made his Sheffield Shield debut at the age of 28 during the 2013–14 season and played two Sheffield Shield matches for Victoria in 2014, returning 77 runs from three innings with a best of 47. He captained Footscray-Edgewater Cricket Club to the Victorian Premier Cricket title. In November 2018 Russ became the club's leading First-XI run scorer.

In September 2017 Russ was appointed coaching and talent development manager at Cricket Victoria leading a team which included Guy McKenna and former Australian player Cathryn Fitzpatrick.

== Personal life ==
Away from cricket, Russ has worked as a high school teacher.
