= Dean Turner =

Dean Turner may refer to:

- Dean Turner (footballer) (born 1959), former Australian rules footballer
- Dean Turner (ice hockey) (born 1958), retired American professional ice hockey defenseman
- Dean Turner (musician) (1972–2009), Australian rock musician and record producer
