= Dean Young =

Dean Young may refer to:

- Dean Young (poet) (1955–2022), American poet
- Dean Young (rugby league) (born 1983), Australian professional rugby league footballer
- Dean Young (cartoonist) (born 1938), scripter for the Blondie comic strip
- Dean Young (snooker player) (born 2002), Scottish professional snooker player
- Dean Young (Australian politician) (born 1973), member of the Tasmanian House of Assembly
- Dean Young, American politician; candidate in the 2013 Alabama's 1st congressional district special election
