= Dean Collins =

Dean Collins may refer to:

- Dean Collins (dancer) (1917–1984), American dancer
- Dean Collins (actor) (born 1990), American actor
