= Dean Barker =

Dean Barker is the name of:

- Dean Barker (speedway rider) (born 1970), former British international speedway rider
- Dean Barker (sailor) (born 1972), New Zealand America's Cup competitor
