= Dean White (basketball) =

American basketball player (1923–1992)

Personal information
- Born: May 30, 1923 Malta, Ohio, U.S.
- Died: June 24, 1992 (aged 69) Mohave County, Arizona, U.S.
- Listed height: 6 ft 7 in (2.01 m)
- Listed weight: 220 lb (100 kg)

Career information
- High school: Salem Community (Salem, Illinois)
- College: Valparaiso (1946–1947)
- Position: Forward

Career history
- 1947: Sheboygan Red Skins
- 1947–1948: Seattle Athletics
- 1948–1949: Vancouver Hornets

Dean William Wendell "Donk" White (May 30, 1923 – June 24, 1992) was an American professional basketball player. He played for half of one season at Valparaiso University before he left school to play professionally. He then played in the National Basketball League for the Sheboygan Red Skins in five games during the 1946–47 season and averaged 4.2 points per game. White also spent two seasons in the Pacific Coast Professional Basketball League.
