= AUTEN-67 =

Chemical compound

Clinical data
- ATC code: None

Legal status
- Legal status: Investigational

Identifiers
- IUPAC name: N-[3-(1H-Benzimidazol-1-yl)-1,4-dioxo-1,4-dihydro-2-naphthalenyl]-4-nitrobenzenesulfonamide
- CAS Number: 301154-74-5
- PubChem CID: 2324086
- ChemSpider: 1736536
- UNII: G53CH4RJ72

Chemical and physical data
- Formula: C_{23}H_{14}N_{4}O_{6}S
- Molar mass: 474.45 g·mol^{−1}
- 3D model (JSmol): Interactive image
- SMILES: c1ccc2c(c1)C(=O)C(=C(C2=O)n3cnc4c3cccc4)NS(=O)(=O)c5ccc(cc5)[N+](=O)[O-]
- InChI: InChI=1S/C23H14N4O6S/c28-22-16-5-1-2-6-17(16)23(29)21(26-13-24-18-7-3-4-8-19(18)26)20(22)25-34(32,33)15-11-9-14(10-12-15)27(30)31/h1-13,25H; Key:FSAINSJUQREKEK-UHFFFAOYSA-N

AUTEN-67 is an autophagy-enhancing drug candidate that increases autophagic flux in cell lines and in vivo models.

It hampers the progression of neurodegenerative symptoms in a Drosophila model of Huntington's disease. It is developed by Velgene Biotechnology Ltd.
