= Dean Prosser =

Dean Prosser may refer to:

- William Lloyd Prosser (1898–1972), Dean of the College of Law at UC Berkeley from 1948 to 1961
- Dean T. Prosser (1917–2007), Republican member of the Wyoming House of Representatives
