= Dean Peterson =

Dean Peterson may refer to:

- Dean Peterson (American football) (born 1949), head football coach for the Frostburg State University Bobcats
- Dean Peterson (ice hockey) (born 1988), Australian ice hockey player
- Dean M. Peterson (1931–2004), American inventor
- Dean Bobby Peterson, a character who appeared in The Simpsons episodes "Homer Goes to College" and "Faith Off”.
