= Dean Thompson =

Dean Thompson may refer to:

- Dean Thompson (Home and Away), a fictional character on the Australian television soap opera Home and Away
- Dean R. Thompson (born 1967), American diplomat
- Dean Thompson (racing driver) (born 2001), American stock car racer
