= Dean Schneider =

Swiss animal sanctuary founder (born 1992)

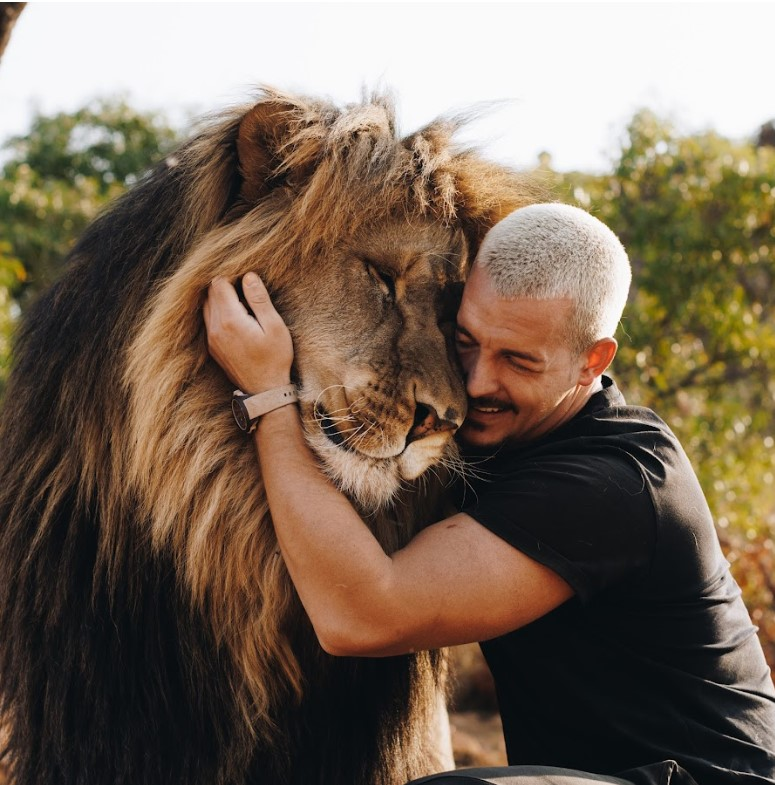
- Schneider in 2024
- Born: October 3, 1992 (age 34); Zurich, Switzerland
- Website: deanschneider.com

Dean Schneider (born October 3, 1992) is a Swiss former entrepreneur, animal sanctuary founder, wildlife conservationist, and social media personality living in South Africa.

== Life ==
Dean Schneider was born in Zurich. From a young age, he was passionate about nature, drawing inspiration from his idol, Steve Irwin.

Schneider launched a financial company at age 21 and sold it to dedicate his life to wildlife conservation. After selling his business, Schneider moved to South Africa in 2017 and established the Hakuna Mipaka Oasis, an animal sanctuary for rescued wildlife.

As of October 2024, Schneider has over 11 million followers on Instagram, 10.5 million on TikTok and YouTube alike.

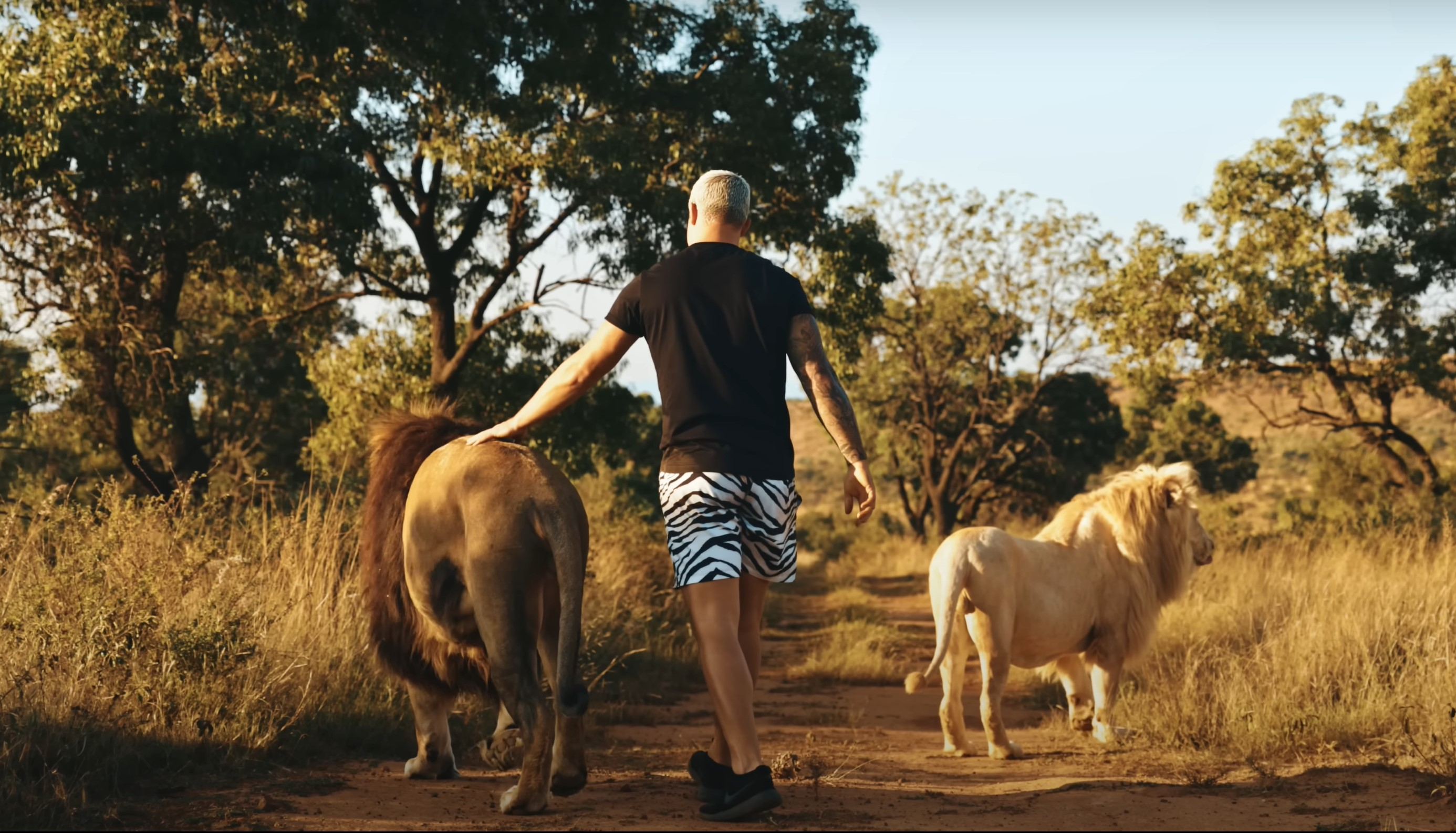
Dean walking with two male lions in the Live Wild Reserve

Hakuna Mipaka, meaning "no limits" in Swahili, covers about 400 hectares in South Africa. The sanctuary houses various animals, including lions, cheetahs, capuchin monkeys, meerkats, hyenas, and reptiles. It features large enclosures and a dedicated area, the Live Wild Reserve, for rescued lions. The sanctuary also conducts rehabilitation programs aimed at releasing some animals back into the wild.

Hakuna Mipaka Oasis keeps its location private and does not allow public or tourist access.

Schneider has faced financial challenges in maintaining Hakuna Mipaka Oasis. He acknowledges that his income from social media is insufficient to cover all costs and that he cannot rely consistently on donations, particularly due to the impact of the COVID-19 pandemic. Schneider has been hesitant to enter into partnerships with large brands.

In May 2020, UK's The Times reported that Schneider was under investigation by South Africa's animal welfare agency following a video he uploaded, in which he struck one of his lion cubs on the paw after it scratched his face, causing Schneider a bleeding wound above his right eye. Schneider defended his actions, stating the lion was unharmed and that he was teaching it about boundaries. In order for him to be accepted into the pride, it is necessary that he behave toward the cubs in the same way that the adult lions would. The matter eventually subsided without any consequences.
