= Dean Neugent =

American politician

Member of the Texas House of Representatives from district 21-2
- In office January 12, 1965 – January 9, 1973
- Preceded by: Donald Maurice Brown
- Succeeded by: District abolished

Personal details
- Born: May 28, 1916 Mount Pleasant, Texas
- Died: April 1, 2003 (aged 86) Webster, Texas
- Party: Democratic

Dean Neugent (May 28, 1916 – April 1, 2003) was an American politician who served in the Texas House of Representatives from district 21-2 from 1965 to 1973.

He died on April 1, 2003, in Webster, Texas at age 86.
