= Dean L. Ray =

US Army Air Forces pilot

Dean L. (Lake) Ray (died 19 January 1954) was a pilot in the United States Air Force.

While performing at an airshow in Managua, Nicaragua, his airplane malfunctioned. Ray remained in his aircraft and directed it away from spectators, and died in the subsequent crash.

He was declared a national hero, and the then-president of Nicaragua attended his funeral. His photo is featured on a Nicaraguan Stamp.
