= Dean James =

Dean James is the name of:

- L. Dean James, American writer
- Dean James (footballer), Indonesian footballer
