= Dean McLaughlin =

Dean McLaughlin may refer to:

- Dean McLaughlin (writer) (born 1931), American science fiction writer
- Dean Benjamin McLaughlin (1901–1965), American astronomer
