= Dean Zimmerman =

Dean Zimmerman may refer to:

- Dean Zimmerman (philosopher)
- Dean Zimmerman (film editor)

== See also ==
- Dean Zimmermann, American politician
