= Dean Hall =

Dean Hall may refer to:

- Dean Hall (game designer) (born 1981), New Zealand video game designer
- Dean Hall (racing driver) (born 1957), American former racing driver
- Dean Hall (rugby union) (born 1977), former South African rugby player
