= Dean Faulkner Wells =

American author, editor, and publisher

External videos
- Q&A With Dean Faulkner Wells, Southern Living

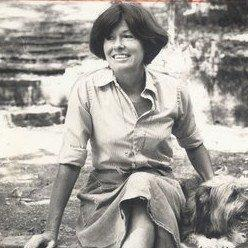
Dean Faulkner Wells in 1978

Dean Faulkner Wells (March 22, 1936 – July 27, 2011) was an American author, editor, and publisher.

== Personal life ==
Dean Faulkner Wells was born on March 22, 1936, four months after her father, Dean Swift Faulkner, died in a plane crash. Dean Swift Faulkner, a pilot, was the younger brother of novelist William Faulkner. Wells was adopted by her uncle, whom she knew as Pappy, after her father's death. William Faulkner lived in Oxford, Mississippi, on his 29-acre Rowan Oak estate.

Wells was educated at the University of Mississippi and the University of Geneva, Switzerland.

Wells was married to the writer Lawrence Wells, with whom she started the Yoknapatawpha Press Faulkner Contest. She had three children by her first marriage: Diane, Paige and Jon.

== Career ==
Dean Faulkner Wells and her second husband, Lawrence Wells, were co-owners of Yoknapatawpha Press, an independent press in Oxford, Mississippi. They co-founded the Faux Faulkner parody contest. Wells compiled a number of the parodies in The Best of Bad Faulkner. The couple also published a quarterly journal, The Faulkner Newsletter and Yoknapatawpha Review, devoted to the life and work of William Faulkner. From 1985 to 1988 Wells was a contributing editor for Southern Magazine. Her articles were published in The Paris Review, Parade Magazine, Ladies Home Journal and Southern Review.

Wells wrote and edited eight books—the last of which was an autobiography, Every Day by the Sun: A Memoir of the Faulkners of Mississippi, published by Crown in March 2011, four months before she died. Every Day by the Sun is about Wells’ growing up in a literary family whose identity was shaped by its most famous member, William Faulkner. Wells based her memoir on 35 years of research with family members and friends, as well as a lifetime of memories and family stories of her uncle, William Faulkner, her grandmother, Maud Butler Falkner, and her mother, Louise Meadow.

Wells wrote to her editor, "In the spring of 2008 I found myself the oldest surviving Faulkner of my generation, the last primary source and blood relative who could say ‘I was there,’ or ‘I remember when.’ It has taken seventy-plus years for me to summon up the discipline and courage to undertake this project. It isn't easy to write an autobiography when one grew up as a tadpole in a pond with a bull frog named William Faulkner."

== Death ==
Dean Faulkner Wells died July 27, 2011, at the Baptist Medical Center-North Mississippi in Oxford, due to complications of a stroke. She was 75.

== Published works ==
=== Book author ===
- Dean Faulkner Wells; William Faulkner (September 1, 1980). The Ghosts of Rowan Oak: William Faulkner's Ghost Stories for Children. Yoknapatawpha Press. ISBN 978-0-916242-07-7. Translations: Japanese, French, Spanish, Catalan, Italian.
- William Faulkner; Dean Faulkner Wells; Willie Morris (1981). Werewolf.
- Dean Faulkner Wells (November 1, 1984). Belle-Duck at the Peabody. Yoknapatawpha Press. ISBN 978-0916242800.; illustrated children's book about the ducks at the Peabody Hotel in Memphis.
- Dean Faulkner Wells (1987). The Best Christmas of All. Downhome Publications.
- Dean Faulkner Wells (March 22, 2011). Every Day by the Sun: A Memoir of the Faulkners of Mississippi. Crown/Archetype. ISBN 978-0-307-59106-7.

=== Book editor ===
- Dean Faulkner Wells, Hunter Cole, ed. (1980). Mississippi Heroes. University Press of Mississippi. ISBN 978-0-87805-128-1.; an anthology of essays about prominent Mississippians.
- Dean Faulkner Wells, ed. (1981). The Great American Writers' Cookbook. Yoknapatawpha Press. ISBN 978-0-916242-14-5.
- Dean W. Wells, ed. (June 1, 1982). The Great American Politicians' Cookbook. Yoknapatawpha Press. ISBN 978-0-916242-18-3.
- Dean Faulkner Wells, ed. (1991). The Best of Bad Faulkner: Choice Entries from the Faux Faulkner Competition. Harcourt Brace Jovanovich. ISBN 978-0-15-611850-7.; collected parodies of the international Faux Faulkner Contest.
- Dean Faulkner Wells, ed. (1992). The Faulkner Newsletter & Yoknapatawpha Review. Oxford, Mississippi: Yoknapatawpha Press.
- Dean Faulkner Wells, ed. (September 2, 2003). The New Great American Writers Cookbook. University Press of Mississippi. ISBN 978-1-57806-589-9.

=== Articles ===
- Dean Faulkner Wells (Autumn 1976). "The Trains Belonged to Everybody: Faulkner as Ghost Writer". Southern Review: 864.
- Dean Faulkner Wells (December 21, 1980). "A Christmas Remembered". The Spokesman-Review/Personality Parade Section: 4.

== See also ==
- William Cuthbert Faulkner
