= Coin snatching =

Magic routine

Coin snatching, often nicknamed the Chinese elbow trick, consists of a simple illusion in which a coin is placed on the elbow, the hand of the same arm is placed on the arm's shoulder, and the hand is swung forward to catch the coin. The trick can also be performed with a stack of coins. If performed correctly with a stack of coins, it will appear that they have teleported with a bang.

A world record of 328 coins was set in 1993 by Dean Gould, in accordance with British rules which specify that coins must be 10g or heavier (ruling out US quarters), that they may be arranged in multiple stacks, and that the catcher is allowed to drop some coins, counting only those that remain in the hand.
