= Dean Jones =

Dean Jones may refer to:

- Dean Jones (cricketer) (1961–2020), Australian cricketer
- Dean Jones (actor) (1931–2015), American actor
- Dean Jones, singer of Extreme Noise Terror
