= Dean Marney (author) =

American writer

Dean Marney (born 1952) is the author of several children's books along a common theme, including:

- The Christmas Tree That Ate My Mother
- The Computer That Ate My Brother
- The Easter Bunny That Ate My Sister
- The Jack-O'-Lantern That Ate My Brother
- The Turkey That Ate My Father and
- The Valentine That Ate My Teacher

He is also the writer of Pet-rified!, How to Drive Your Family Crazy... On Halloween and How to Drive Your Family Crazy... On Valentine's Day.
