= Dean Ross (footballer) =

Australian rules footballer (born 1955)

Personal information
- Full name: Dean Ross
- Born: 19 January 1955 (age 71)
- Original team: Dandenong
- Height: 196 cm (6 ft 5 in)
- Weight: 102 kg (225 lb)
- Position: Ruck

Playing career^{1}
Years	Club	Games (Goals)
1979	St Kilda	2 (1)
- ^{1} Playing statistics correct to the end of 1979.

Dean Ross (born 19 January 1955) is a former Australian rules footballer who played with St Kilda in the Victorian Football League (VFL).
