= Dean Evan Hart =

American optometrist (born 1957)

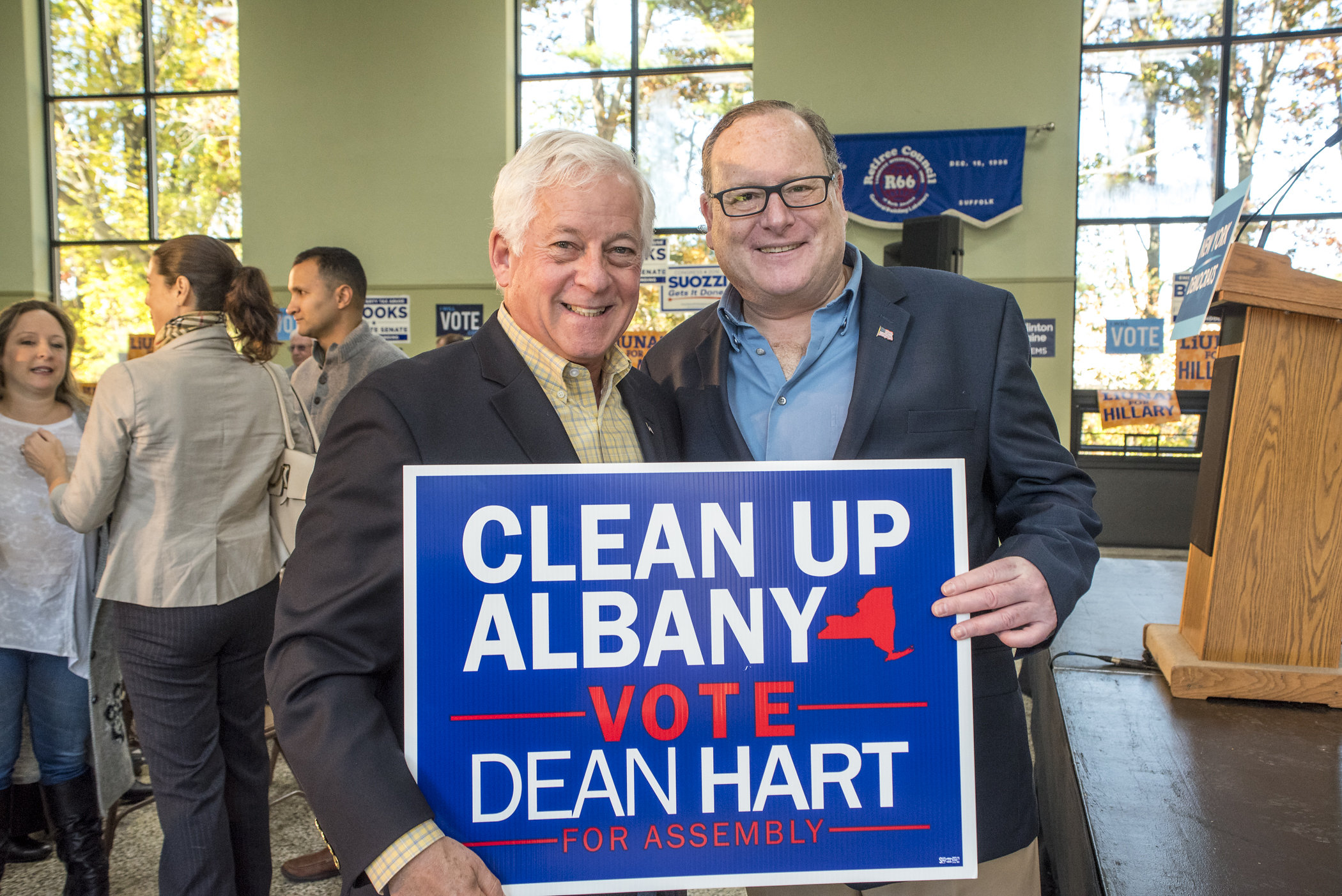
- Born: November 4, 1957 (age 69)
- Occupation: Optometrist
- Known for: Scientist, clinician
- Website: www.deanhart.com

Dean Evan Hart (born November 4, 1957), also known as Dean Hart is an American scientist, clinical optometrist, professor, and the founder of Woodbury Ophthalmic Group and Woodbury Optical Studio. Dean Hart ran for Nassau County Legislature in 2015, was a candidate for the New York State Assembly in the 15th Assembly District in 2016, and ran for town office in 2017.

== Early life and education ==
Dean Evan Hart was born November 4, 1957, in Jericho, New York. He graduated with a bachelor's degree from New York Institute of Technology and earned an M.A. in biology from Hofstra University. Hart holds an O.D. from SUNY College of Optometry and conducted postgraduate research at the University of California, Berkeley. He completed an M.S. degree in bioethics at Columbia University in May 2021. He is currently a candidate for an M.P.H. at New York University.

== Career ==
=== Ophthalmology and optometry ===
Hart held positions in academia starting with Director of the Low Vision Clinic to teach Ophthalmology residents to treat and manage the visually impaired at Harlem Hospital Medical Center. He taught Refraction and Physical Optics within the Department of Ophthalmology, Columbia University, The Edward S. Harkness Eye Institute.

Hart was an Associate Research Scientist at the College of Physicians and Surgeons, Department of Ophthalmology, Harkness Eye Institute from 1989 to 1998. He was appointed Assistant Professor of Optometric Science in Ophthalmology at Columbia University directing contact lens and low vision clinics from 1998 to 2012.

Hart concurrently founded Woodbury Ophthalmic Group and Woodbury Optical Studio in 1989 in Hicksville, NY and practiced optometry there. He is licensed by the American Board of Opticianry. He has delivered lectures and presentations opticians, optometrists and ophthalmologists. Hart was also quoted in press about protecting people's eyes when viewing the solar eclipse of August 21, 2017.

Hart had conducted laboratory and clinical research. He has lectured and written about immunocytohistochemistry, polymer chemistry, biochemistry, electron microscopy, dietary and environments effects on tears, clinical epidemiology, microbiology, elemental analysis, physiological optics, bioethics, and contact lenses. After completing his Master's in Bioethics at Columbia University, Hart published on the topic of bioethics in Voices in Bioethics and Nursing Ethics. He also published in American Journal of Bioethics Neuroscience and the Journal of Law Medicine and Ethics while studying public health at New York University.

=== Politics ===
In 2015, Hart ran for Nassau County Legislature on the Democratic line against an incumbent Republican in the 18th Legislative District and lost by one-percent. Hart founded Long Island Citizens for Good Government (LICGG) and became its president. As President of the group he called on Nassau County District Attorney to investigate Town of Oyster Bay contracts. He also supports oversight of Oyster Bay finances. In spring of 2016, Hart launched his campaign for the New York State Assembly. Hart has been a candidate for town, county, and state offices, running on Democrat, Working Family, Women's Equality, Independence, Green, and Reform party lines. He has advocated for anti-corruption and government reform.

== Humanitarian work ==
Hart joined Moreano World Medical Mission on a trip to the Dominican Republic and provided tools to fit eyeglasses for children and seniors without cost to patients. The trip was praised by New York State Assemblyman Chuck Lavine. Hart spoke at the United Nations about the disproportionate impact of inadequate healthcare for women and their eyes after his trip to the Dominican Republic.

As President of Long Island Citizens for Good Government, Hart advocated for better inmate treatment and spending practices in prisons.

Hart has volunteered with the visually impaired in Harlem, New York. In 2016 he volunteered for ophthalmic care at the special Olympics in Brockport, NY. Dr. Hart is currently the Ophthalmic Affairs Chairman of Friends for Good Health, a not-for-profit organization that works to provide healthcare for people in poverty.

== Recognition and Awards ==
- Empire State Bioethics Consortium - Member since 2021
- Long Island Business News- 2016 Top CEO Awards
- Long Island Business news- 2016 Achievements in Healthcare
- American Optometric Association's, Contact Lens Section awarded its inaugural legend award in 2012.
- American Optometric Association, Contact Lens Section awarded its yearly achievement award in 1999.
- The American Optometric Foundation - Harold Kohn memorial award for outstanding paper based on original investigative research work in 1987.
- The National Eye Institute - travel fellowship for the presentation of research findings, 1985 ARVO meeting
- Scuba diving photographic award: Front and back covers of Alert Diver magazine

== See also ==
- Optometry
- New York State Assembly
- Bioethics
