= Rosetta Stone Learning Center =

Japanese chain of language conversation schools

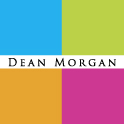
- Company type: Kabushiki gaisha
- Industry: Language instruction
- Founded: 2004
- Headquarters: Tokyo, Japan
- Key people: Dean Rogers (President, CEO)
- Website: rosettastone-lc.jp

Rosetta Stone Learning Center (ロゼッタストーン・ラーニングセンター, rozettasutōn rāningusentā) is a chain of eikaiwa (English conversation) and French conversation schools in Japan.

The company was founded in 2004 and is currently headquartered in Ginza, Tokyo. There are ten schools under three brands. The founder, current president and CEO is Dean Rogers. The company provides language lessons on a "one-to-one" (one student and one teacher) basis using textbook lessons and online instructor aids.

== Founding and history ==
The company was founded in April 2004 by Dean Morgan, with the first school opening on July 14, 2004, in Nishi-Shinjuku, offering English and French lessons. In 2005, Rogers became the sole primary owner.

In September 2006, the Sala school brand was acquired and absorbed as a subsidiary of Dean Morgan K.K., providing one-to-one and group lessons at two locations in Umeda and Namba, in Osaka. As of January 2019, there are 2 schools in western Japan located in Umeda and Kyoto.

In 2008, the Hummingbird Pronunciation school brand and trademarks were acquired and integrated into Dean Morgan K.K. Hummingbird Pronunciation is a patented English pronunciation method.

As of April 2012, there are a total of ten schools located in Tokyo and Osaka, with nearly 2,000 students. As of January 2019, there are now over 80 direct and alliance schools (alliance formed with Aviva/DAIEI pc and training schools in 2017).

In April 2015, Dean Morgan formed a capital and business alliance with Rosetta Stone Inc. and subsequently rebranded the schools to Rosetta Stone Learning Center. The company then relocated the headquarters from Shinjuku, Tokyo to Ginza, Tokyo in May 2017.

In April 2017 a majority 59.8% ownership stake was purchased by Link and Motivation Group (TSE: 2170) and the home office was moved to the 12th Floor of the Ginza 6 building. As of April 1, 2021 Dean Morgan K.K. became a 100% fully owned subsidiary of Link and Motivation Group.

On January 1, 2022, Dean Morgan K.K. was fully merged into Link Academy Inc the education group company of Link and Motivation group. All employees of Dean Morgan K.K. were integrated and became employees of Link Academy INC. Dean Rogers the CEO of Dean Morgan K.K. is a board member now of Link Global Solutions (LGS) and serves as the International IR Officer (Investor Relations) for Link and Motivation Group.

== School locations ==
The company operates Rosetta Stone Learning Center schools in Tōhoku, Kantō, Chūbu, Kansai, Chūgoku, Shikoku, and Kyushu. Hummingbird English pronunciation schools are found in Shinjuku, Ginza, Ikebukuro, and Umeda. The company also runs a Rosetta Stone Premium Club school previously at Ginza Six and was relocated to Kabukiza Tower as of October 2021.
