= Dean Moon (rugby league) =

Australian rugby league footballer

Personal information
- Full name: Dean Moon
- Born: 6 April 1975 (age 49)

Playing information
- Position: Fullback, Wing
Club
Years	Team	Pld	T	G	FG	P
1995–98	Illawarra Steelers	17	0	20	0	40
- Source: As of 2 February 2023

Dean Moon is an Australian former professional rugby league footballer who played in the 1990s. He played for Illawarra in the ARL and NRL competitions.

== Playing career ==
Moon made his first grade debut for Illawarra in round 5 of the 1995 ARL season against the Gold Coast Seagulls at WIN Stadium. In the 1997 ARL season, Moon played 17 matches as the club qualified for the second finals series. Moon played in Illawarra's elimination finals loss to the Gold Coast Chargers at Parramatta Stadium.

In the 1998 NRL season, Moon played four matches in what would be Illawarra's final year in the competition. At the end of the season, Illawarra formed a joint venture with St. George to form St. George Illawarra. No contract was made available to Moon to join the new team.
