= Dean Kent =

Dean Kent may refer to:

- Dean Kent (footballer) (born 1994), Australian footballer
- Dean Kent (swimmer) (born 1978), New Zealand swimmer
