= Dean Ho =

Dean Ho may refer to:

- Dean Ho (biomedical engineer), American bio-nano-technology professor
- Dean Ho (wrestler), (stage name of Dean Higuchi), a professional American wrestler
