= Dean Burrows =

English cricketer

Personal information
- Full name: Dean Andrew Burrows
- Born: 20 June 1966 (age 60); Peterlee, County Durham, England
- Batting: Right-handed
- Bowling: Right-arm medium-fast

Domestic team information
- Years: Team
- 1984–1987: Gloucestershire
- 1984–1987: Durham

Career statistics
Competition	First-class	List A
Matches	2	2
Runs scored	0	1
Batting average	0.00	–
100s/50s	–/–	–/–
Top score	0	1*
Balls bowled	144	78
Wickets	–	2
Bowling average	–	35.00
5 wickets in innings	–	–
10 wickets in match	–	–
Best bowling	–	1/32
Catches/stumpings	–/–	2/–
- Source: Cricinfo, 30 July 2011

Dean Andrew Burrows (born 20 June 1966) is a former English cricketer. Burrows was a right-handed batsman who bowled right-arm medium-fast. He was born in Peterlee, County Durham.

Burrows made his debut in county cricket for Durham in the 1984 Minor Counties Championship against Bedfordshire. He would go on to play Minor counties cricket on an infrequent basis for Durham until 1987, making a total of 5 Minor Counties Championship appearances and a single MCCA Knockout Trophy appearance. In the same season that he made his debut for Durham in, he also made his first-class debut for Gloucestershire against Essex in the 1984 County Championship. He made a further first-class appearance, which came in 1987 against Oxford University in 1990. His first-class appearances were without success, with Burrows not scoring any runs and bowling a total of 24 wicket-less overs. He also played the same number of List A matches for the county, against Essex in the 1984 John Player Special League and Worcestershire in the 1986 John Player Special League. He took 2 wickets in these matches at an average of 35.00, with best figures of 1/32. Having spent the majority of his time at Gloucestershire playing in the Second XI, Burrows left the county at the end of the 1987 season.
