= Dean Snell =

Plastics engineer

- Education: Bachelor of Science
- Alma mater: University of Massachusetts Lowell
- Occupation: Plastics Engineer

Dean Snell is a plastics engineer and designer of many name brand golf balls, including Titleist Pro V1 and TaylorMade TP. He is the founder of Snell Golf, a company where he designs and sells namesake golf ball. He also had a brief career as a professional in the American Hockey League.

== Early life and education ==
Snell attended New Bedford High School before attending University of Massachusetts Lowell on a hockey scholarship. He graduated with a Bachelor's degree in Plastics Engineering. He later played Junior-A level amateur hockey and then for the Hershey Bears in the American Hockey League.

== Career ==
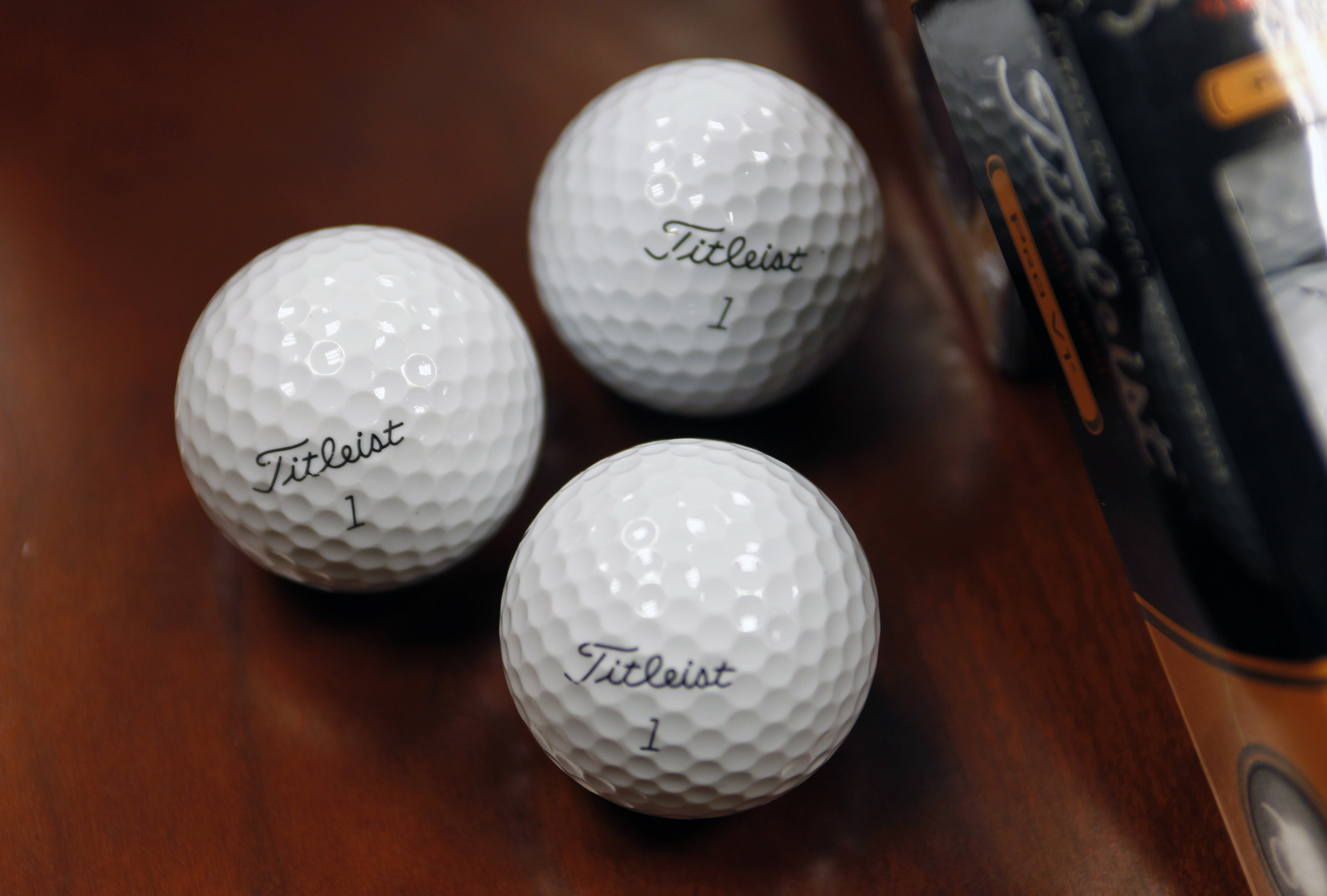
Titleist Pro v1 golf balls designed by Dean Snell.

Prior to his work in the golf industry, Snell spent time with BF Goodrich in its Aerospace and Defense Division where he worked on F-14 and F-15 fighter jets. He joined Titleist in the late 1980s and developed a number of patents for the company, including for the Pro V1. Snell worked for Titleist for seven years.

Snell left Titleist in 1996 and went to work for TaylorMade where he was vice president of golf ball research and development. When he joined the company, it only had one golf ball patent and no one assigned to ball research and development. He was given freedom within the company which grew to approximately 60 research and developers by 2006. During his time there, he designed the TaylorMade TP golf ball which was used on the PGA Tour by players such as Sergio García and Justin Rose. He left the company in 2014.

After leaving TaylorMade, Snell began designing his own golf ball line under his new company Snell Golf.
