= Dean Marsh =

English cricketer

Dean Marsh (born 3 December 1963) is an English cricketer. He was a right-handed batsman and a right-arm medium-pace bowler who played for Shropshire. He was born in Bedworth, Warwickshire and educated at Ash Green School, Exhall.

Marsh began his career with Warwickshire's Second XI, with whom he played for three seasons. However, he was not to play cricket for the next eight seasons, until he joined the Old Edwardians of the Midland Combined Counties League in 1991.

Marsh's only List A appearance came in the 1993 NatWest Trophy, against Somerset. From the upper-middle order, he scored a duck, and took figures of 0–51 with the ball from eleven overs.

In 1993, he appeared for Shropshire in two matches, scoring 86 runs.

At club level he has played for Coventry and Highway.
