= Dean Oliver =

Dean Oliver may refer to:

- Dean Oliver (basketball) (born 1978), basketball player who played with the Golden State Warriors
- Dean Oliver (statistician) (born 1969), contributor to the statistical analysis of basketball
