= Dean Dodds =

New Zealand footballer

Personal information
- Date of birth: 12 August 1977 (age 47)
- Place of birth: New Zealand
- Position(s): Midfielder

Senior career*
Years	Team	Apps	(Gls)
- North Shore United AFC
1998	Bohemian F.C.		
2000	Tampere United	8	(0)
- Glenfield Rovers
- *Club domestic league appearances and goals

Dean Dodds (born 12 August 1977) in New Zealand)is a former New Zealand association football player who played as a midfielder.

== Career ==
In 1998, Dodds signed for Irish club Bohemian along with 3 other New Zealand players. A few months after arrival, he said that the stadiums were larger in Ireland but the medical facilities were better in New Zealand. However, Dodds was released in December that year due to a change of head coach.

For 2000, he signed for Finnish top flight side Tampere United, making 8 league appearances there.
