= Dean Bell (cricketer) =

English cricketer

Personal information
- Full name: Dean William Bell
- Born: 3 May 1992 (age 34); Blackpool, Lancashire, England
- Batting: Right-handed
- Role: Wicket-keeper

Domestic team information
- Years: Team
- 2011–2013: Cambridge MCCU

Career statistics
Competition	First-class
Matches	7
Runs scored	134
Batting average	14.88
100s/50s	0/0
Top score	47
Catches/stumpings	13/7
- Source: Cricinfo, 8 October 2013

Dean William Bell (born 3 May 1992) is an English cricketer. Bell is a right-handed batsman who fields as a wicket-keeper. He was born in Blackpool, Lancashire and educated at Sedbergh School.

Bell made his first-class debut for Cambridge MCCU against Essex in 2011. He made two further first-class matches that season, against Middlesex and Surrey.

He is now bossing it for Horwich RMI CC.
