= Dean Champion =

American professor of Criminal Justice

Dr. Dean Champion
- Born: Dean John Champion; January 21, 1940
- Died: February 23, 2009 (aged 69); Texas
- Citizenship: American
- Occupations: Professor, Author
- Writing career
- Language: English
- Subjects: Criminal Justice, Sociology

Dean Champion was a professor of Criminal Justice at Texas A&M University. He wrote 40 textbooks and received several awards.

== Personal life ==
Champion was born January 21, 1940, in California. While at BYU, he met H. LaVon Stephens, and married her on September 23, 1960; they had three children: Geri A. Champion, Dean Jay Champion, and Sean D. Champion, MD. They later divorced and he later married Gerri K. Champion. He died on February 23, 2009.

== Career ==
Champion earned undergraduate and graduate degrees at Brigham Young University, and a PhD at Purdue University. He was a tenured faculty member, teaching sociology and criminal justice, at the University of Tennessee, "retired" from there, and chaired the Criminal Justice Department at Minot State, moved down to Cal State Long Beach, and then taught at Texas A&M University until his death. He wrote about 40 textbooks and reference books, and published some papers. His specialty interests included juvenile justice, criminal justice administration, corrections, and statistics/methods. During his career, he received several awards including TAMIU's Distance Educator of the Year, and College of Arts and Sciences Scholar of the Year, both in 2006.

== Bibliography ==
- Champion, Dean J. (co-editor) The Juvenile Justice System: Delinquency, Processing, and the Law. 1st ed, 1992; 7th ed. 2013
- Champion, Dean J. Criminal Courts: Structures, Process, and Issues (2008)
- Champion, Dean J. Probation, Parole, and Community Corrections in the United States (2008)
- Champion, Dean J. (editor) Sentencing A Reference Handbook. Santa Barbara, Calif: ABC-CLIO, 2008 According to WorldCat, the book is held in 1504 libraries
- Champion, Dean J. The American Dictionary of Criminal Justice: Key Terms and Major Court Cases. Los Angeles, Calif: Roxbury Pub, 2005.
- Champion, Dean J. (editor) Police Misconduct in America A Reference Handbook. ABC-CLIO. Santa Barbara, Calif: ABC-CLIO, 2001. According to WorldCat, the book is held in 1624 libraries
