= Dean Herbert =

Dean Herbert may refer to:

- Dean Herbert (footballer) (born 1956), Australian rules footballer
- Dean Herbert (developer), Australian software developer who created the game osu!

== See also ==
- Dan Herbert
