= Dean Kondziolka =

Canadian swimmer

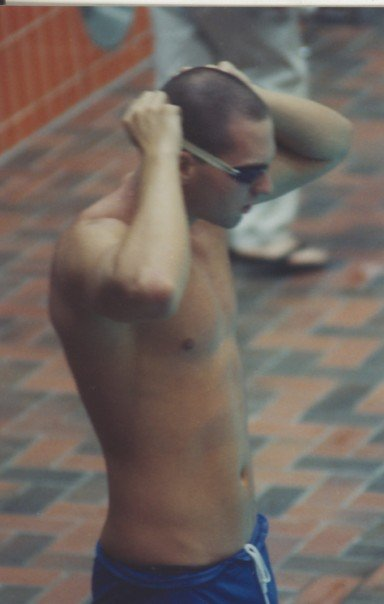

Personal information
- Full name: Dean Kondziolka
- Nickname: "Kondo"
- National team: Canada
- Born: April 14, 1972 (age 54) Mississauga, Ontario

Sport
- Sport: Swimming
- Strokes: Freestyle
- College team: University of Lethbridge
Medal record
Men's swimming
Representing Canada
Pan Pacific Championships
Bronze medal – third place	1993 Kobe	50 m freestyle
Bronze medal – third place	1993 Kobe	4×100 m freestyle
Summer Universiade
Bronze medal – third place	1993 Buffalo	50 m freestyle

Dean Kondziolka (born April 14, 1972) is a Canadian swimmer.

He is a 7 Time National Champion and Canadian record holder in the 50 meter sprint and 100 meter freestyle, and is the first Canadian born swimmer to break 23 seconds in the 50 meter freestyle event.

Kondziolka began his swimming career at the Lakeshore Swim Club at the age of 9, shortly thereafter moving to the Mississauga Aquatic Club at age 11. Kondziolka first broke on the national scene in 1986 at the age of 14, making national time standards in the sprint events, 50 and 100 meter freestyle. He was the youngest competitor (by two years) at the 1986 Canadian National Championships in Edmonton. He went on to compete in the Netherlands and Germany as a member of the Junior National Teams in 1987 and 1988.

His first national championship was attained in 1990 at the age of 17 (Summer nationals in Etobicoke Ontario) and highest rankings in the world were 1st (LC season, 1993 documented at the Sprint eliminator meet in Nantes, France) and 4th in the 50m freestyle (Speedo World Rankings) respectively. He was a member of the Canadian National Team from 1990 to 1996, winning numerous individual and relay medals at national and international competitions, and was the only swimmer to medal at both the World University Games and 1993 Pan Pacific Swimming Championships in 1993.

Notable international and national swimming competitions include:

- World Cup Rome 1990
- FINA World Championships 1991 Perth, Australia
- FINA Swimming World Cup World Cup tour 1991
- 1991 Pan Pacific Swimming Championships, Edmonton, Canada
- 1993 Summer Universiade World University games 1993 Buffalo, New York (bronze)
- Pan Pacific Swimming Championships 1993 Kobe, Japan (bronze)
- FINA World Aquatics Championships Rome, Italy 1994
- Pan Pacific Swimming Championships 1995 Atlanta, Georgia
- FISU Games (bronze)
- Canadian National Championships (7 time national title)

In the years 1991 and 1992 Kondziolka attended the University of California, Berkeley, on a full scholarship where he trained with Matt Biondi.

He also attended and swam at The University of Lethbridge during the years 1993-1995 under tutelage of longtime coach Bill Barton.

He was chosen as the City of Mississauga athlete of the year in 1991 and subsequently elected to the celebrity book stacks at the Mississauga Library system, and chosen swimmer of the year in 1993-94 by Canadian Interuniversity Sport. University of Lethbridge Athlete of the Year 1994-1995

Currently resides in Corpus Christi, Texas as the head coach of the High Performance Aquatic Club and a professional photographer.
