= Dean Butler =

Dean Butler may refer to:

- Dean Butler (field hockey) (born 1977), member of the Australia men's national field hockey team
- Dean Butler (actor) (born 1956), American movie and television actor
