= Dean Crouch =

Irish dancer and musician

- Occupation: Musician
- Known for: Irish Dance, Musician

Dean Crouch is an Irish dancer and musician. At the age of 12 he was Great Britain Champion, British National Champion, All Scotland Champion, All Ireland Champion, North American Champion and the World Champion, winning with a score of 900 out of a possible 900.

Crouch began dancing at the age of 7. He previously did stage work, but stopped to pursue Irish dance. At the age of 12 he retired from competitive dance to pursue a new challenge as an Irish musician. He plays the piano accordion, piano and keyboards. He has won the World Irish Piano Accordion Championships and the All Ireland Fleadh and he plays live music for many major competitions as well as local feiseanna (Irish stepdance festivals). Crouch has also recorded Irish dance music CDs.
