= Dean Kelly =

Dean Kelly may refer to:

- Dean Kelly (footballer) (born 1985), Irish footballer
- Dean Kelly (artist) (born 1977), Irish painter and photographer
- Dean Kelly (singer), English singer
- Dean Lennox Kelly (born 1975), English actor
