= Dean DellaPenna =

American plant biochemist

- Born: Steubenville, Ohio, US

Academic background
- Education: BSc., Botanical Cellular Biology, 1984, Ohio University; PhD, 1987, University of California, Davis

Dean DellaPenna is an American plant biochemist. He is a university distinguished professor of biochemistry and molecular biology at Michigan State University.

== Early life and education ==
DellaPenna was born in Steubenville, Ohio but raised in Wintersville, Ohio. Following high school, DellaPenna worked in a steel mill before attending Ohio University. He subsequently became the first member of his family to enroll at college. After taking Botany 101 as a first year elective, he chose to pursue a career as a plant biochemist. Upon graduating with a Bachelor of Science degree in 1984, DellaPenna went on to earn his PhD at the University of California, Davis and was a postdoctoral researcher at Washington State University.

== Career ==
Following his postdoctoral position at Washington State University, DellaPenna joined the faculty at the University of Arizona from 1990 to 1996 before moving to the University of Nevada, Reno (UNR). During his tenure at UNR, DellaPenna cloned a gene in a mustard-type plant that increased its production of vitamin E in seeds. Following this discovery, DellaPenna was recruited to join the faculty at Michigan State University in 2000.

In 2013, DellaPenna was named a university distinguished professor of biochemistry and molecular biology, the highest honor bestowed on faculty members by the university. Following this, DellaPenna was also honored as an MSU Foundation Professor in recognition of his "exceptional contributions to research and instruction." While serving in these roles, he was also elected a member of the National Academy of Sciences.

DellaPenna has been recognized as a Pioneer Member of the American Society of Plant Biologists.
