= Dean Brown (disambiguation) =

Dean Brown (born 1943) is an Australian politician, Premier of South Australia 1993–1996.

Dean Brown may also refer to:

- Dean Brown (guitarist) (1955–2024), American jazz fusion guitarist and session musician
- Dean Brown (sportscaster) (born 1961), Canadian hockey commentator
- H. Dean Brown (1927–2003), American scientist
- Dean Brown (American football) (born 1945), American football defensive back
