= Dean Kino =

Australian cricketer and cricket administrator

Personal information
- Full name: Dean Kino
- Born: 15 April 1971 (age 55); Melbourne, Victoria, Australia
- Batting: Left-handed
- Bowling: Left-arm fast-medium

Domestic team information
- Years: Team
- 1999: Oxford University

Career statistics
Competition	First-class
Matches	5
Runs scored	31
Batting average	7.75
100s/50s	–/–
Top score	14*
Balls bowled	858
Wickets	6
Bowling average	97.50
5 wickets in innings	–
10 wickets in match	–
Best bowling	2/84
Catches/stumpings	–/–
- Source: Cricinfo, 18 June 2020

Dean Kino (born 15 April 1971) is an Australian former cricket administrator and first-class cricketer.

Kino was born in April 1971 at Melbourne. He later studied for a Bachelor of Laws at Monash University, before studying for his doctorate in law at Magdalen College at the University of Oxford. While studying at Oxford, he played first-class cricket for Oxford University in 1999, making five appearances. He scored 31 runs in his five matches, while with his left-arm fast-medium bowling he took 6 wickets.

Kino joined Cricket Australia (CA) in 2004 as their general manager of legal and business affairs. Kino was staying at the Taj Mahal Palace Hotel when it came under attack during the 2008 Mumbai attacks. He escaped five and a half hours after the attack had begun at 10 p.m. Kino was head of the governing council for the Champions League Twenty20 (CLT20). He was an important link in the relationship between Cricket Australia and the Board of Control for Cricket in India, in addition to working alongside cricket officials Sundar Raman, N. Srinivasan and Giles Clarke in the 2014 constitutional changes in the International Cricket Council. He resigned from CA and the CLT20 in September 2014.
