= Dean Neikirk =

American engineer

Dean Neikirk is an American engineer who is currently the Cullen Trust for Higher Education Endowed Professor in Engineering #7 in the Department of Electrical and Computer Engineering at the University of Texas at Austin.

== Background and academic career ==
Neikirk pursued undergraduate studies at Oklahoma State University, where he earned a B.S. in physics and mathematics in 1979. He later received an M.S. and Ph.D. in applied physics from California Institute of Technology.

In 2013, Neikirk was appointed associate dean for graduate studies at the University of Texas. He was involved in the development of the "electric tongue", which could detect nutrition and other properties of materials using advanced sensor technologies.
