= Dean Tuftin =

Canadian country music singer (born 1970)

- Born: November 28, 1970 (age 55); Drayton Valley, Alberta, Canada
- Genres: Country
- Occupation: Singer
- Years active: 2002–present
- Labels: Royalty

Dean Tuftin (born November 28, 1970) is a Canadian country music singer. Tuftin is also a professional rodeo team roping competitor, having qualified for the National Finals Rodeo NFR once when competing on the Professional Rodeo Cowboys Association (PRCA) circuit. He also competed with multiple world champion team roper, and 2018 ProRodeo Hall of Fame inductee Speed Williams.

== Career ==
His debut album "Not So Little Anymore" was released in 2002 via Stolen Horse Records and distributed to brick and mortar channels in Canada through two distribution deals, one with Sextant Records/EMI Music Canada and the other through Royalty Records. A chance meeting in Nashville between a songwriter and a music industry veteran led to the Tuftin camp enlisting the expertise of former Warner Music Canada label rep Greg Balec in attempts to make waves at country radio. A lead-off single was rushed to radio stations across Canada, producing a Top 20 hit out of the box. That debut single, "Talk Is Cheap" had music directors across the nation in a state of frenzy, desperately making calls to get their hands on the track. Tuftin followed that instant success with "I'm Not So Little Anymore," which skyrocketed into the Top 10, then charted with singles "You Can't" and "In Her Eyes." In 2005, the lead-off single "Wide Open Highway" from his forthcoming second album, reached the No. 1 spot on the Radio & Records Canadian country singles chart and was nominated for Independent Song of the Year at the 2005 Canadian Country Music Association awards, however, the finished album featuring several potential chart toppers like the power ballad "It's About Time" and upbeat "Grain of Salt" among others, never saw commercial release. "Wide Open Highway" later appeared on store shelves on the Sony/BMG Canada various artists compilation CD Country Heat 2006 and also garnered a 2006 SOCAN Award for Canadian Country Song of the Year. A second single titled "A Definite Maybe" was released but failed to impact at Canadian radio, mainly due to the track's lack of Cancon content. Tuftin also released two music videos, both of which hit the top ten on Country Music Television in Canada.

Tuftin is also an accomplished team roper. He is a two-time winner of the Canadian Team Roping Championship and won the United States Team Roping Championships US Open Tour in 2003.

Tuftin joined the Professional Rodeo Cowboys Association (PRCA) in 1996. He competed on the PRCA in 1999, 2003, 2006, 2007, and 2010. In 2003, as mentioned previously he won the United States Team Roping Championships US Open Tour. In 2007, he partnered with 8 time World Champion Speed Williams in the team roping event.

Together, they qualified for the National Finals Rodeo (NFR); he was the first Canadian to qualify in team roping. They attended the NFR at the Thomas & Mack Center in Las Vegas, Nevada, in 2007, winning the 8th Round and coming in 11th in the Average. He retired from the PRCA in 2010. His total winnings from the PRCA is $255,276.00.

== Personal ==
Dean Tuftin was born on November 28, 1970, in Drayton Valley, Alberta, Canada. Tuftin resides with his family in Scottsdale, Arizona, his wife, Leslie and two daughters. Dean hails from a rodeo family in Alberta: a barrel racing mother, a team roping father, and a bullfighting brother. Tuftin attributes his success to his youth, "It is very important for people to understand that horsemanship and fundamentals are key in this business. You have to know how to make a good horse to keep winning." Tuftin can be found golfing or hunting in his sparse free time.

== Discography ==
=== Studio albums ===
Title	Album details
Not So Little Anymore	Release date: 2002; Label: Royalty Records Sextant Records EMI Music Canada Stolen Horse; Formats: CD

=== Singles ===
Year	Single	Album
2002	"Talk Is Cheap"	Not So Little Anymore
2002	"I'm Not So Little Anymore"	Not So Little Anymore
2003	"You Can't"	Not So Little Anymore
2003	"In Her Eyes"	Not So Little Anymore
2004	"Wide Open Highway"	Non-album songs
2005	"A Definite Maybe"	Non-album songs

=== Music videos ===
Year	Video	Director
2002	"I'm Not So Little Anymore"	Joel Stewart
2003	"You Can't"	Stephano Barberis

== Awards and nominations ==
Year	Association	Category	Result
2003	Canadian Country Music Association	Chevy Trucks Rising Star Award	Nominated
2003	Canadian Country Music Association	Independent Male Artist of the Year	Nominated
2005	Canadian Country Music Association	Independent Song of the Year – "Wide Open Highway"	Nominated
