= Dean Coleman (footballer) =

English footballer (born 1985)

Personal information
- Full name: Dean Samuel Coleman
- Date of birth: 18 September 1985 (age 41)
- Place of birth: Dudley, England
- Height: 6 ft 1 in (1.85 m)
- Position: Goalkeeper

Team information
- Current team: Halesowen Town
- Number: 1

Youth career
- ?–2004: Walsall

Senior career*
Years	Team	Apps	(Gls)
2004–2006	Walsall	2	(0)
2005–2006	→ Halesowen Town (loan)	53	(0)
2006	Bromsgrove Rovers	4	(0)
2006–2007	Willenhall Town	0	(0)
2007–2010	Kidderminster Harriers	36	(0)
2010–	Halesowen Town	12	(0)
	Worcester City	16	(0)
	Halesowen Town	0	(0)
- * Club domestic league appearances and goals as of 18:53, 4 April 2010 (UTC)

Dean Samuel Coleman (born 18 September 1985) is an English footballer who plays as a goalkeeper for Halesowen Town.

== Career ==
=== Walsall ===
Born in Dudley, West Midlands, Coleman came up through the youth system at Football League club Walsall, playing in two first team games during the 2004–05 season and spending the 2005–06 season on loan at Halesowen Town, before being released by the club in May 2006.

=== Bromsgrove Rovers ===
He played for Bromsgrove Rovers during the 2006–07 season.

=== Willenhall ===
Also during the 2006–07 season he played for Willenhall Town. Helping Willenhall to the Southern Football League Division One Midlands play-off Final in May 2007.

=== Kidderminster Harriers ===
Coleman joined Conference National club Kidderminster Harriers in July 2007. He was used as a back-up to the club's other goalkeepers Scott Bevan and Chris Mackenzie during the 2007–08 season and signed a new one-year contract in May 2008.

=== Halesowen Town ===
In the 2010–11 season Coleman joined Halesowen Town in a part exchange deal with Kidderminster Harriers and has become a regular starter for the Yeltz, Starting every game so far. Dean left Halesowen but since rejoined in December 2012.
