= Din (name) =

Din has been used as both a surname and given name. Din in Arabic means "religion" or "way of life". Din is also a component of longer names, especially in Arabic. For example, Aladdin or ʻAlāʼ ad-Dīn means "nobility of religion". See ad-Din for a list of these names. Notable people with the name include:

== Given name ==
- Din Beramboi (1966–2010), Malaysian comedian, actor and radio DJ
- Din Mehmeti (1932–2010), Albanian poet from Kosovo
- Din Mohammad (born 1953), Afghani politician, writer and Pashtun tribal leader
- Din Thomas (born 1976), American mixed martial artist
- Din Djarin (born circa 28 BBY), the titular protagonist of the Disney+ television series The Mandalorian.

== Surname ==
- Asif Din (born 1960), English cricketer
- Daniela Del Din (born 1969), Sammarinese sport shooter
- Fazal Din (1921–1945), Indian recipient of the Victoria Cross
- Gina Din (born 1961), East African businesswoman
- Haron Din (1940–2016), spiritual leader of the Pan-Malaysian Islamic Party
- Umar Din (r. 1526–1553), Sultan of the Sultanate of Ada
