= Dean G. Auten =

American politician (1937–2026)

Member of the Georgia House of Representatives
- In office 1977–1986

Personal details
- Born: September 6, 1937 Gaston County, North Carolina, U.S.
- Died: February 11, 2026 (aged 88)
- Party: Republican
- Spouse: Eleanor Elaine Hyers
- Children: 3
- Education: Appalachian State Teachers College

Dean Garland Auten (September 6, 1937 – February 11, 2026) was an American politician. He served as a Republican member of the Georgia House of Representatives.

== Life and career ==
Auten was born in Gaston County, North Carolina. He attended Appalachian State Teachers College.

He served in the Georgia House of Representatives from 1977 to 1986.

Auten died on February 11, 2026, at the age of 88.
