= 2017–18 Falkirk F.C. season =

Falkirk F.C's 2017–2018 football season

Falkirk
2017–18 season
- Chairman: Margaret Lang
- Manager: Peter Houston (until 24 September); Paul Hartley (from 4 October)
- Stadium: Falkirk Stadium
- Championship: Eighth Place
- League Cup: Second round
- Challenge Cup: Quarter-final
- Scottish Cup: Quarter-final
- Top goalscorer: League: Louis Longridge (7); All: Longridge, Muirhead, McKee & Jakubiak (7)
- Highest home attendance: 6,094 vs. Dumbarton, Championship, 24 February 2018
- Lowest home attendance: 2,044 vs. Stirling Albion, League Cup, 15 July 2017
- Average home league attendance: 4,676
Home colours	Away colours

The 2017–18 season was Falkirk's fifth season in the Scottish Championship and their seventh consecutive season in the second-tier of Scottish football following their relegation from the Scottish Premier League at the end of the 2009–10 season. Falkirk also competed in the League Cup, Challenge Cup and the Scottish Cup.

== Summary ==
=== Management ===
Falkirk began the 2017–18 season under the management of Peter Houston who had guided the club to a Premiership play-off place in his previous two seasons. On 24 September, Houston left his position as manager following a poor start to the season. Paul Hartley was appointed as his replacement on 4 October and guided the club to safety with an eighth-place finish at the end of the season.

== Results and fixtures ==
Win Draw Loss Postponed

=== Scottish Championship ===
5 August 2017 1	St Mirren	3–1	Falkirk	St Mirren Park, Paisley
15:00	Reilly 9'; Demetriou 33'; Smith 46'	Report	Austin 2'; Muirhead (red card) 77'	Attendance: 4,639; Referee: Don Robertson

12 August 2017 2	Falkirk	1–1	Dumbarton	Falkirk Stadium, Falkirk
15:00	Hippolyte 24' (pen.)	Report	Roy 13'	Attendance: 3,864; Referee: Alan Muir

19 August 2017 3	Dunfermline Athletic	3–1	Falkirk	East End Park, Dunfermline
15:00	McManus 5'; Cardle 11', 90+2'	Report	Sibbald (red card) 52'; Miller (red card) 62'; Taiwo 83'	Attendance: 5,751; Referee: John Beaton

26 August 2017 4	Falkirk	1–4	Queen of the South	Falkirk Stadium, Falkirk
15:00	Gasparotto 89'	Report	Kerr 2'; Dobbie 41', 46', 49' (pen.)	Attendance: 4,108; Referee: Colin Steven

9 September 2017 5	Brechin City	1–1	Falkirk	Glebe Park, Brechin
15:00	Graham 72'	Report	Harris 15'	Attendance: 748; Referee: Barry Cook

16 September 2017 6	Falkirk	0–0	Dundee United	Falkirk Stadium, Falkirk
15:00		Report		Attendance: 4,874; Referee: John Beaton

23 September 2017 7	Falkirk	0–2	Livingston	Falkirk Stadium, Falkirk
15:00		Report	Mullen 47'; Mullin 53'; Gallagher (red card) 90+1'	Attendance: 4,091; Referee: Greg Aitken

30 September 2017 8	Greenock Morton	0–1	Falkirk	Cappielow, Greenock
15:00		Report	Mckee 62'	Attendance: 1,992; Referee: John McKendrick

14 October 2017 9	Falkirk	0–0	Inverness CT	Falkirk Stadium, Falkirk
15:00		Report		Attendance: 4,107; Referee: Nick Walsh

21 October 2017 10	Falkirk	0–0	St Mirren	Falkirk Stadium, Falkirk
15:00		Report		Attendance: 5,080; Referee: Don Robertson

28 October 2017 11	Queen of the South	4–2	Falkirk	Palmerston Park, Dumfries
15:00	Dobbie 16'; Dykes 19'; Brownlie 75'; Lyle 90+1'	Report	Mckee 85'; McGhee 89'	Attendance: 1,716; Referee: Steven Kirkland

4 November 2017 12	Falkirk	1–1	Dunfermline Athletic	Falkirk Stadium, Falkirk
15:00	McGhee 64'	Report	Higginbotham 28' (pen.) (red card) 56'; McManus (red card) 90+2'	Attendance: 5,465; Referee: Craig Thomson

19 November 2017 13	Dundee United	3–0	Falkirk	Tannadice Park, Dundee
15:00	McDonald 21'; Robson 41'; Flood 45'	Report		Attendance: 5,915; Referee: Alan Muir

25 November 2017 14	Falkirk	0–3	Greenock Morton	Falkirk Stadium, Falkirk
15:00		Report	Harkins 9'; Thomson 43', 61'	Attendance: 4,361; Referee: Greg Aitken

19 December 2017 15	Livingston	0–0	Falkirk	Almondvale Stadium, Livingston
19:45		Report		Attendance: 1,287; Referee: Gavin Duncan

23 December 2017 16	Dumbarton	0–0	Falkirk	Dumbarton Football Stadium, Dumbarton
15:00		Report		Attendance: 874; Referee: John McKendrick

30 December 2017 17	Falkirk	3–2	Queen of the South	Falkirk Stadium, Falkirk
15:00	Grant 20'; Hippolyte 42'; Longridge 44'	Report	Dobbie 45+2'; Kerr 90+1'	Attendance: 4,285; Referee: Alan Newlands

2 January 2018 18	Dunfermline Athletic	2–0	Falkirk	East End Park, Dunfermline
15:00	Clark 16'; McManus 51'	Report		Attendance: 7,140; Referee: Willie Collum

6 January 2017 19	Falkirk	6–1	Dundee United	Falkirk Stadium, Falkirk
15:00	Grant 21'; Tumilty 41'; Longridge 57', 73'; Robson 65'; Kidd 90'	Report	King 6'	Attendance: 5,326; Referee: Nick Walsh

9 January 2018 20	Inverness Caledonian Thistle	4–1	Falkirk	Caledonian Stadium, Inverness
19:45	Oakley 10'; Bell 28'; Mulraney 30'; Baird 88'	Report	Longridge 88'	Attendance: 2,014; Referee: John Beaton

13 January 2018 21	Greenock Morton	0–1	Falkirk	Cappielow, Greenock
15:00		Report	Sibbald 20'	Attendance: 2,084; Referee: Andrew Dallas

27 January 2018 22	Falkirk	3–1	Inverness Caledonian Thistle	Falkirk Stadium, Falkirk
15:00	Muirhead 48' (pen.), 66' (pen.); Nelson 87'	Report	Mulraney (red card) 45'; MacKay 84'	Attendance: 4,251; Referee: Euan Anderson

3 February 2018 23	Falkirk	1–3	Livingston	Falkirk Stadium, Falkirk
15:00	Jakubiak 72'	Report	Lithgow 39'; Hardie 59'; De Vita 62'	Attendance: 4,123; Referee: John McKendrick

6 February 2018 24	Falkirk	3–1	Brechin City	Falkirk Stadium, Falkirk
19:45	Jakubiak 13'; Loy 28'; Longridge 71'	Report	Mackin 67'	Attendance: 4,214; Referee: Matt Northcroft

17 February 2018 25	Brechin City	0–1	Falkirk	Glebe Park, Brechin
15:00	Lynas (red card) 68'	Report	Jakubiak 90+3'	Attendance: 805; Referee: Greg Aitken

24 February 2018 26	Falkirk	0–0	Dumbarton	Falkirk Stadium, Falkirk
15:00		Report		Attendance: 6,094; Referee: Colin Steven

10 March 2018 27	Falkirk	3–1	Greenock Morton	Falkirk Stadium, Falkirk
15:00	Muirhead 4' (pen.); Nelson 18'; Jakubiak 30'	Report	Harkins 90+1'	Attendance: 4,218; Referee: Euan Anderson

17 March 2018 28	Livingston	0–0	Falkirk	Almondvale, Livingston
15:00		Report		Attendance: 1,319; Referee: Gavin Duncan

31 March 2018 29	Falkirk	3–0	Brechin City	Falkirk Stadium, Falkirk
19:45	Muirhead 17'; Sibbald 29'; Nelson 60'	Report	Crighton (red card) 41'; McLean (red card) 44'	Attendance: 4,422; Referee: Stephen Finnie

3 April 2018 30	Queen of the South	2–2	Falkirk	Palmerston Park, Dumfries
19:45	Thomson 51'; Brownlie 73'	Report	Nelson 5'; Longridge 87'	Attendance: 1,062; Referee: Steven Kirkland

7 April 2018 31	Falkirk	1–2	Dunfermline Athletic	Falkirk Stadium, Falkirk
15:00	Muirhead 79' (pen.)	Report	Higginbotham 24'; Aird 48'	Attendance: 5,784; Referee: Don Robertson

10 April 2018 32	Inverness CT	1–0	Falkirk	Caledonian Stadium, Inverness
19:45	Mulraney 81'	Report		Attendance: 2,053; Referee: Nick Walsh

14 April 2018 33	Dundee United	1–0	Falkirk	Tannadice Stadium, Dundee
15:00	Mikkelsen 7'	Report		Attendance: 5,170; Referee: Craig Thomson

17 April 2018 34	St Mirren	1–2	Falkirk	St Mirren Park, Paisley
19:45	Hippolyte 55' (pen.)	Report	McKee 83'; Sibbald 90+1'	Attendance: 3,761; Referee: Alan Muir

21 April 2018 35	Dumbarton	2–5	Falkirk	Dumbarton Football Stadium, Dumbarton
15:00	Gallagher 34'; Burt 87'	Report	Jakubiak 19'; Longridge 47'; Robson 59'; Sibbald 70'; McKee 86'	Attendance: 942; Referee: Mike Roncone

28 April 2018 36	Falkirk	1–0	St Mirren	Falkirk Stadium, Falkirk
15:00	Blair 85'	Report		Attendance: 5,508; Referee: Stephen Finnie

=== Scottish League Cup ===
==== Group stage ====
Results

15 July 2017 Group stage	Falkirk	4–1	Stirling Albion	Falkirk Stadium, Falkirk
15:00	Austin 24'; McKee 26'; Harris 39'; Muirhead 57' (pen.)	Report	Smith 87'	Attendance: 2,044; Referee: David Lowe

22 July 2017 Group stage	Inverness CT	0–2	Falkirk	Caledonian Stadium, Inverness
15:00		Report	McKee 21'; Austin 43'	Attendance: 1,859; Referee: John Beaton

25 July 2017 Group stage	Falkirk	4–0	Forfar Athletic	Falkirk Stadium, Falkirk
19:45	Hippolyte 8', 38', 50'; Austin 29'	Report		Attendance: 2,187; Referee: Kevin Graham

29 July 2017 Group stage	Brechin City	0–3	Falkirk	Glebe Park, Brechin
15:00		Report	Miller 20'; McKee 52'; Harris 72'	Attendance: 712; Referee: Euan Anderson

Pos	Team	Pld	W	PW	PL	L	GF	GA	GD	Pts	Qualification	FAL	INV	STI	BRE	FOR
1	Falkirk (Q)	4	4	0	0	0	13	1	+12	12	Qualification for the Second Round	—	—	4–1	—	4–0
2	Inverness Caledonian Thistle	4	2	1	0	1	5	3	+2	8		0–2	—	—	3–0	—
3	Stirling Albion	4	2	0	1	1	6	5	+1	7		—	0–0p	—	2–0	—
4	Brechin City	4	0	1	0	3	1	9	−8	2		0–3	—	—	—	p1–1
5	Forfar Athletic	4	0	0	1	3	3	10	−7	1		—	1–2	1–3	—	—

Rules for classification: 1) goal difference, 2) goals scored, 3) away goals scored, 4) matches won, 5) away matches won, 6) drawing of lots.
(Q) Qualified to the phase indicated

==== Knockout stage ====
8 August 2017 Second round	Falkirk	1–2 (a.e.t.)	Livingston	Falkirk Stadium, Falkirk
19:45	Craigen 40'	Report	Robinson 32'; De Vita 101'	Attendance: 2,667; Referee: Andrew Dallas

=== Scottish Challenge Cup ===
2 September 2017 Second round	(Republic of Ireland) Sligo Rovers	1–2	Falkirk	The Showgrounds, Sligo
19:45	Sharkey 18'	Report	Austin 9'; Craigen 28'	Attendance: 520; Referee: Keith Kennedy

7 October 2017 Third round	Falkirk	2–0	Dunfermline Athletic	Falkirk Stadium, Falkirk
15:00	Balatoni 19'; Hippolyte 59'	Report	Shiels (red card) 90+6'	Attendance: 4,082; Referee: Steven McLean

11 November 2017 Quarter-final	Inverness CT	1–0	Falkirk	Caledonian Stadium, Inverness
17:15	Bell 57'	Report		Attendance: 1,078; Referee: Euan Anderson

=== Scottish Cup ===
20 January 2018 Fourth round	Livingston	0–1	Falkirk	Almondvale Stadium, Livingston
19:45		Report	Tumilty 90+3'	Attendance: 1,237; Referee: Alan Newlands

10 February 2018 Fifth round	Cove Rangers	1–3	Falkirk	Harlaw Park, Inverurie
15:00	Megginson 3'	Report	Jakubiak 2', 48'; Sibbald 46'	Attendance: 1,687; Referee: Alan Muir

4 March 2018 Quarter-final	Rangers	4–1	Falkirk	Ibrox Stadium, Glasgow
16:15	Cummings 16', 21', 75'; Muirhead 44' (o.g.)	Report	Muirhead 20'	Attendance: 33,968; Referee: Craig Thomson

== Player statistics ==
As of 28 April 2018 (UTC)

No.	Pos	Nat	Player	Total		Championship		League Cup		Scottish Cup		Other	
No.	Pos	Nat	Player	Apps	Goals	Apps	Goals	Apps	Goals	Apps	Goals	Apps	Goals
1	GK	(Scotland) SCO	Robbie Thomson	29	0	20+0	0	4+0	0	2+0	0	2+1	0
2	DF	(Scotland) SCO	Lewis Kidd	18	1	10+6	1	0+0	0	2+0	0	0+0	0
3	DF	(Scotland) SCO	Jordan McGhee	38	3	32+0	2	0+0	0	3+0	1	3+0	0
4	DF	(Scotland) SCO	Aaron Muirhead	43	7	33+0	5	4+0	1	3+0	1	3+0	0
5	DF	(Scotland) SCO	Peter Grant	34	1	24+3	1	4+0	0	2+0	0	1+0	0
6	MF	(Scotland) SCO	Joe McKee	31	7	16+5	4	4+1	3	0+3	0	2+0	0
7	MF	(England) ENG	Tom Taiwo	30	1	21+1	1	3+0	0	2+1	0	2+0	0
10	MF	(Scotland) SCO	Craig Sibbald	29	5	25+1	4	0+0	0	3+0	1	0+0	0
12	GK	(Scotland) SCO	David Mitchell	3	0	1+0	0	1+0	0	0+0	0	1+0	0
14	MF	(Scotland) SCO	Louis Longridge	29	7	24+1	7	0+0	0	3+0	0	1+0	0
16	DF	(Scotland) SCO	Reghan Tumilty	20	2	17+0	1	0+0	0	3+0	1	0+0	0
18	GK	(Northern Ireland) NIR	Conor Hazard	12	0	10+1	0	0+0	0	1+0	0	0+0	0
20	FW	(Scotland) SCO	Kevin O'Hara	22	0	5+13	0	0+3	0	0+0	0	1+0	0
21	MF	(Scotland) SCO	Ryan Blair	8	1	4+3	1	0+0	0	0+1	0	0+0	0
22	FW	(Scotland) SCO	Alex Jakubiak	18	7	13+2	5	0+0	0	2+1	2	0+0	0
23	DF	(Scotland) SCO	Tony Gallacher	17	0	11+0	0	5+0	0	0+0	0	1+0	0
26	MF	(Scotland) SCO	Reis Peggie	0	0	0+0	0	0+0	0	0+0	0	0+0	0
27	DF	(Scotland) SCO	Jonathan Mitchell	0	0	0+0	0	0+0	0	0+0	0	0+0	0
29	FW	(Scotland) SCO	Mark Stowe	0	0	0+0	0	0+0	0	0+0	0	0+0	0
33	FW	(Scotland) SCO	Rory Loy	26	1	9+9	1	4+1	0	1+0	0	1+1	0
35	MF	(Scotland) SCO	Cieran Dunne	6	0	3+2	0	0+0	0	0+0	0	0+1	0
42	DF	(Scotland) SCO	Thomas Robson	21	2	18+0	2	0+0	0	3+0	0	0+0	0
43	FW	(England) ENG	Andrew Nelson	15	4	12+0	4	0+0	0	2+1	0	0+0	0
44	DF	(Scotland) SCO	Paul Watson	24	0	14+4	0	4+0	0	1+0	0	1+0	0
45	MF	(Scotland) SCO	Sean Welsh	11	0	7+4	0	0+0	0	0+0	0	0+0	0
Players who left the club during the 2017–18 season
8	MF	(Scotland) SCO	Mark Kerr	22	0	15+0	0	3+2	0	0+0	0	1+1	0
9	FW	(England) ENG	Nathan Austin	21	5	8+6	1	4+0	3	0+0	0	2+1	1
11	FW	(England) ENG	Myles Hippolyte	16	6	8+2	2	4+0	3	0+0	0	2+0	1
15	DF	(Canada) CAN	Luca Gasparotto	9	1	3+2	1	3+0	0	0+0	0	0+1	0
18	FW	(Scotland) SCO	Lee Miller	18	1	3+10	0	1+4	1	0+0	0	0+0	0
19	FW	(Scotland) SCO	Scott Shepherd	7	0	0+2	0	0+4	0	0+0	0	0+1	0
21	DF	(England) ENG	Conrad Balatoni	11	1	8+0	0	0+0	0	0+0	0	3+0	1
24	MF	(Scotland) SCO	Cameron Blues	8	0	2+4	0	0+0	0	0+0	0	1+1	0
28	MF	(England) ENG	James Craigen	17	2	5+5	0	3+1	1	0+0	0	2+1	1
31	GK	(Scotland) SCO	Robbie Mutch	5	0	5+0	0	0+0	0	0+0	0	0+0	0

== Club statistics ==
=== League table ===
Pos	Team	Pld	W	D	L	GF	GA	GD	Pts	Promotion, qualification or relegation
6	Queen of the South	36	14	10	12	59	53	+6	52	
7	Greenock Morton	36	13	11	12	47	40	+7	50	
8	Falkirk	36	12	11	13	45	49	−4	47	
9	Dumbarton (R)	36	7	9	20	27	63	−36	30	Qualification for the Championship play-offs
10	Brechin City (R)	36	0	4	32	20	90	−70	4	Relegation to League One

Source: Soccerway
Rules for classification: 1) Points; 2) Goal difference; 3) Goals scored; 4) Points in head-to-head matches; 5) Goal difference in hth matches; 6). Goals scored in hth matches; 7). Play-off (only for deciding promotion, play-off participation and relegation).
(R) Relegated

=== Division summary ===
Round	1	2	3	4	5	6	7	8	9	10	11	12	13	14	15	16	17	18	19	20	21	22	23	24	25	26	27	28	29	30	31	32	33	34	35	36
Ground	A	H	A	H	A	H	H	A	H	H	A	H	A	H	A	A	H	A	H	A	A	H	H	H	A	H	H	A	H	A	H	A	A	A	A	H
Result	L	D	L	L	D	D	L	W	D	D	L	D	L	L	D	D	W	L	W	L	W	W	L	W	W	D	W	D	W	D	L	L	L	W	W	W
Position	9	8	9	9	9	9	9	8	8	9	9	9	9	9	9	9	9	9	9	9	9	8	8	8	8	8	7	7	7	7	7	8	8	8	8	8

Updated to match(es) played on 28 April 2018. Source:
A = Away; H = Home; W = Win; D = Draw; L = Loss

== Transfers ==
=== Players in ===
Player	From	Fee
(Scotland) David Mitchell	(Scotland) Dundee	Free
(Scotland) Alex Harris	(Scotland) Hibernian	Free
(Scotland) Rory Loy	(Scotland) Dundee	Free
(Scotland) Robbie Mutch	(Scotland) Aberdeen	Free
(England) Conrad Balatoni	(Scotland) Ayr United	Free
(Scotland) Jordan McGhee	(Scotland) Hearts	Free
(Scotland) Louis Longridge	(Scotland) Hamilton Academical	Loan
(Scotland) Reghan Tumilty	(Scotland) Ross County	Loan
(England) Thomas Robson	(England) Sunderland	Free
(England) Andrew Nelson	(England) Sunderland	Loan
(Scotland) Sean Welsh	(Scotland) Partick Thistle	Free
(Scotland) Alex Jakubiak	(England) Watford	Loan
(Scotland) Ryan Blair	(Wales) Swansea City	Loan
(Northern Ireland) Conor Hazard	(Scotland) Celtic	Loan

=== Players out ===
Player	To	Fee
(Scotland) Bob McHugh	(Scotland) Greenock Morton	Free
(Scotland) David McCracken	(Scotland) Peterhead	Free
(England) Luke Leahy	(England) Walsall	Free
(Scotland) John Baird	(Scotland) Inverness CT	Free
(Canada) Fraser Aird	(Scotland) Dunfermline Athletic	Free
(Scotland) Robbie Mutch	(Scotland) Dumbarton	Loan
(Scotland) Scott Shepherd	(Scotland) Edinburgh City	Loan
(Canada) Luca Gasparotto	(Scotland) Greenock Morton	Loan
(England) Conrad Balatoni	(England) Torquay United	Free
(England) Nathan Austin	(Scotland) Inverness CT	Free
(Scotland) James Craigen	(Scotland) Dunfermline Athletic	Free
(Scotland) Lee Miller	(Scotland) Livingston	Free
(Scotland) Tony Gallacher	(England) Liverpool	£200,000
(Scotland) Mark Kerr	(Scotland) Ayr United	Free
(England) Myles Hippolyte	(Scotland) St Mirren	Free

== See also ==
- List of Falkirk F.C. seasons
