= 2014–15 Hibernian F.C. season =

Hibernian
2014–15 season
- Chairman: Rod Petrie
- Manager: Alan Stubbs
- Stadium: Easter Road
- Championship: Second place
- Challenge Cup: First round, lost to Rangers
- League Cup: Quarter-final, lost to Dundee United
- Scottish Cup: Semi-final, lost to Falkirk
- Top goalscorer: League: Jason Cummings (18); All: Jason Cummings (21)
Home colours	Away colours

The 2014–15 season was Hibernian's first season of play in the second tier of Scottish football since 1999 and their first season in the Scottish Championship, having been relegated from the Scottish Premiership at the end of the previous season. Hibernian also competed in the Challenge Cup, League Cup, Scottish Cup and the Scottish Premiership play-offs.

== Results & fixtures ==
Win Draw Loss Postponed

=== Scottish Championship ===
9 August 2014 Championship	Hibernian	2 – 1	Livingston	Easter Road
15:00	El Alagui 16'; Oxley 19'	SPFL Report	Gallagher 60'	Attendance: 9,390; Referee: Madden

17 August 2014 Championship	Heart of Midlothian	2 – 1	Hibernian	Tynecastle Stadium
12:30	Nicholson 76'; Buaben 80' (pen.); Sow (red card) 88'	BBC Report	Robertson (yellow card) 79' (yellow-red card); El Alagui 90+2'	Attendance: 17,280; Referee: Collum

23 August 2014 Championship	Hibernian	0 – 1	Falkirk	Easter Road
15:00		BBC Report	Loy 13'	Attendance: 9,153; Referee: Allan

30 August 2014 Championship	Alloa Athletic	2 – 1	Hibernian	Recreation Park
15:00	Buchanan 56'; Flannigan 85'	BBC Report	Cummings 15'	Attendance: 2,476; Referee: Finnie

13 September 2014 Championship	Hibernian	3 – 2	Cowdenbeath	Easter Road
15:00	Foster 26'; Malonga 78' (pen.); Cummings 90+4'	BBC Report	Higgins 50'; Robertson 56'	Attendance: 11,021; Referee: McKendrick

20 September 2014 Championship	Queen of the South	1 – 0	Hibernian	Recreation Park
15:00	McShane 29'	BBC Report		Attendance: 3,083; Referee: Muir

29 September 2014 Championship	Rangers	1 – 3	Hibernian	Ibrox Stadium
19:45	Law 55'	BBC Report	Cummings 25', 39'; Gray 31'	Attendance: 31,619; Referee: Murray

4 October 2014 Championship	Hibernian	1 – 1	Raith Rovers	Easter Road
15:00	Robertson 44'	BBC Report	Nade 68'	Attendance: 9,954; Referee: Beaton

11 October 2014 Championship	Hibernian	0 – 0	Dumbarton	Easter Road
15:00		BBC Report		Attendance: 7,923; Referee: Cook

18 October 2014 Championship	Livingston	0 – 4	Hibernian	Almondvale Stadium
17:30		BBC Report	Malonga 31'; Handling 53'; McGeouch 70' (pen.); Heffernan 86'	Attendance: 2,666; Referee: Aitken

26 October 2014 Championship	Hibernian	1 – 1	Heart of Midlothian	Easter Road
12:15	Malonga 44'	BBC Report	Paterson (red card) 79'; Öztürk 90+2'	Attendance: 14,562; Referee: Madden

8 November 2014 Championship	Cowdenbeath	1 – 2	Hibernian	Central Park
	Robertson 63'	BBC Report	Hanlon 25'; Cummings 41'	Attendance: 2,563; Referee: Charleston

15 November 2014 Championship	Hibernian	0 – 0	Queen of the South	Easter Road
15:00		BBC Report		Attendance: 10,069; Referee: Salmond

22 November 2014 Championship	Dumbarton	3 – 6	Hibernian	Dumbarton Football Stadium
	Kane 50'; Graham 61'; Fleming 71'	BBC Report	Allan 23'; Malonga 27', 64', 85'; Hanlon 30'; Stanton 83'	Attendance: 1,409; Referee: Murray

6 December 2014 Championship	Falkirk	1 – 0	Hibernian	Falkirk Stadium
	McCracken 90+1'	BBC Report		Attendance: 4,983; Referee: Finnie

13 December 2014 Championship	Hibernian	2 – 0	Alloa Athletic	Easter Road
	Handling 28'; Malonga 73'	BBC Report		Attendance: 8,031; Referee: Charleston

20 December 2014 Championship	Raith Rovers	1 – 3	Hibernian	Stark's Park
15:00	McKay 40'	BBC Report	Cummings 44'; Fontaine 78'; Malonga 81'	Attendance: 3,166; Referee: Robertson

27 December 2014 Championship	Hibernian	4 – 0	Rangers	Easter Road
12:15	Gray 8'; Cummings 12'; Robertson 63'; Craig 70'	BBC Report		Attendance: 15,261; Referee: Madden

3 January 2015 Championship	Heart of Midlothian	1 – 1	Hibernian	Tynecastle Stadium
12:45	Walker 40'	BBC Report	Cummings 23'	Attendance: 17,279; Referee: McLean

10 January 2015 Championship	Hibernian	3 – 3	Falkirk	Easter Road
15:00	Cummings 12', 42'; Leahy 39' (o.g.)	BBC Report	Baird 18'; Craig 59' (o.g.); Grant 65'	Attendance: 9,498; Referee: Collum

17 January 2015 Championship	Hibernian	5 – 0	Cowdenbeath	Easter Road
15:00	Hanlon 9'; Cummings 24'; Robertson 74'; Booth 84'; Stevenson 90'	BBC Report		Attendance: 8,240; Referee: Dallas

24 January 2015 Championship	Queen of the South	0 – 2	Hibernian	Palmerston Park
15:00		BBC Report	McGeouch 63' (pen.); Robertson 75'	Attendance: 3,677; Referee: Murray

31 January 2015 Championship	Hibernian	1 – 1	Raith Rovers	Easter Road
15:00	Boyle 46'	BBC Report	Nadé 90'	Attendance: 9,024; Referee: Anderson

13 February 2015 Championship	Rangers	0 – 2	Hibernian	Ibrox Stadium
19:45	Žaliūkas (yellow card) 76'; Murdoch (yellow card) 90+3'	BBC Report	Robertson 19'; Allan (yellow card) 54'; Stevenson 82'	Attendance: 29,769; Referee: McLean

21 February 2015 Championship	Hibernian	3 – 0	Dumbarton	Easter Road
15:00	Djédjé 29'; Malonga 32', 56'	BBC Report		Attendance: 8,370; Referee: Aitken

28 February 2015 Championship	Alloa Athletic	0 – 1	Hibernian	Recreation Park
15:00		BBC Report	Allan 26'	Attendance: 2,024; Referee: McKendrick

11 March 2015 Championship	Hibernian	2 – 1	Livingston	Easter Road
19:45	Cummings 31'; Djédjé 89'	BBC Report	Sekajja 88'	Attendance: 7,857; Referee: Finnie

14 March 2015 Championship	Cowdenbeath	0 – 2	Hibernian	Central Park
15:00		BBC Report	Fyvie 32'; Cummings 34'; Allan (yellow card) 84'	Attendance: 1,822; Referee: Anderson

22 March 2015 Championship	Hibernian	0 – 2	Rangers	Easter Road
12:45		BBC Report	Wallace 44'; Miller 80'	Attendance: 14,075; Referee: Collum

28 March 2015 Championship	Raith Rovers	2 – 1	Hibernian	Stark's Park
15:00	Stewart 53'; Vaughan 84'	BBC Report	Fyvie 56'	Attendance: 3,183; Referee: Muir

4 April 2015 Championship	Hibernian	0 – 1	Queen of the South	Easter Road
15:00		BBC Report	Durnan 47'	Attendance: 8,773; Referee: Murray

8 April 2015 Championship	Dumbarton	1 – 2	Hibernian	Dumbarton Football Stadium
19:45	Megginson 55'; Turner (red card) 57'	BBC Report	Hanlon 42'; Cummings 66'	Attendance: 1,110; Referee: Charleston

12 April 2015 Championship	Hibernian	2 – 0	Heart of Midlothian	Easter Road
14:15	Cummings 30'; Hanlon (yellow card) 42'; Forster (yellow card) 45+2'; Boyle (yellow card) 76'; El Alagui 90+1'; El Alagui (yellow card) 90+3'	BBC Report	Gomis (yellow card) 57'; Eckersley (yellow card) 75'; Pallardó (yellow card) 81'	Attendance: 13,530; Referee: Clancy

22 April 2015 Championship	Livingston	1 – 3	Hibernian	Almondvale Stadium
19:45	Hippolyte 14'; Cole (yellow card) 44' (yellow-red card)	BBC Report	Robertson 8'; Cummings 15'; Malonga 82'	Attendance: 2,301; Referee: Dallas

25 April 2015 Championship	Hibernian	4 – 1	Alloa Athletic	Easter Road
15:00	Boyle 31'; Craig 42'; Cummings 61'; Malonga 71'	BBC Report	Flannigan 63'	Attendance: 8,328; Referee: McKendrick

2 May 2015 Championship	Falkirk	0 – 3	Hibernian	Falkirk Stadium
12:15		BBC Report	Boyle 5'; Cummings 40'; Malonga 77'	Attendance: 7,672; Referee: Robertson

=== Premiership play-offs ===
20 May 2015 Play-offs SF R1	Rangers	2 – 0	Hibernian	Ibrox Stadium
19:45	Clark 44'; Miller 63'	BBC Report		Attendance: 41,236; Referee: Murray

23 May 2015 Play-offs SF R2	Hibernian	1 – 0 (1–2 agg.)	Rangers	Easter Road
12:00	Cummings 90+4'	BBC Report		Attendance: 14,742; Referee: Beaton

=== Scottish Challenge Cup ===
5 August 2014 First round	Rangers	2 – 1 (a.e.t.)	Hibernian	Ibrox Stadium
19:35	MacLeod 14'; Law 101'	SPFL Report	Handling 59'; Handling (red card) 80'	Attendance: 18,138; Referee: Beaton

=== Scottish League Cup ===
26 August 2014 Second round	Hibernian	3 – 2	Dumbarton	Easter Road
19:45	El Alagui 78', 84'; Stanton 90+1'	BBC Report	Megginson 52'; Gilhaney 59'	Attendance: 5,066; Referee: Robertson

23 September 2014 Third round	Ross County	0 – 2	Hibernian	Victoria Park
		BBC Report	Malonga 22', 36'; McGeouch (red card) 83'	Attendance: 1,819; Referee: Finnie

29 October 2014 Quarter Final	Hibernian	3–3 (a.e.t.) (6–7 p)	Dundee United	Easter Road
19:45	Malonga 17'; Cummings 57'; Kennedy 78'	BBC Report	Erskine 12'; Connolly 19'; Dow 61'	Attendance: 8,689; Referee: Beaton
	Penalties
	Allan (penalty scored); Craig (penalty scored); Hanlon (penalty scored); Harris (penalty scored); Malonga (penalty scored); Stanton (penalty scored); Kennedy (penalty missed); Gray (penalty missed)		Erskine (penalty scored); Souttar (penalty scored); Armstrong (penalty scored); Dow (penalty scored); Çiftçi (penalty scored); Spittal (penalty scored); Rankin (penalty missed); Townsend (penalty scored)

=== Scottish Cup ===
29 November 2014 Fourth round	Alloa Athletic	1 – 2	Hibernian	Recreation Park
	Meggatt 15'	BBC Report	Craig 28'; Gray 37'; Malonga (red card) 87'	Attendance: 2,138; Referee: Madden

7 February 2015 Fifth round	Hibernian	3 – 1	Arbroath	Easter Road
15:00	Djédjé 42'; Gordon 60' (o.g.); McGeouch 68'	BBC Report	Stewart 17'	Attendance: 9,065; Referee: Dallas

8 March 2015 Quarter Final	Hibernian	4 – 0	Berwick	Easter Road
12:45	Cummings 26'; Stevenson 28'; Stanton 66'; Fontaine 82'	BBC Report		Attendance: 11,259; Referee: Madden

18 April 2015 Semi Final	Hibernian	0 – 1	Falkirk	Hampden Park
12:15		BBC Report	Sibbald 75'	Attendance: 21,227; Referee: Beaton

== Player statistics ==
During the 2014–15 season, Hibs have used thirty different players in competitive games. The table below shows the number of appearances and goals scored by each player.

As of 23 May 2015 (UTC)

No.	Pos	Nat	Player	Total		Championship		Other^{[a]}		League Cup		Scottish Cup	
No.	Pos	Nat	Player	Apps	Goals	Apps	Goals	Apps	Goals	Apps	Goals	Apps	Goals
1	GK	(England) ENG	Mark Oxley	45	1	35+0	1	3+0	0	3+0	0	4+0	0
2	DF	(Scotland) SCO	David Gray	34	3	23+2	2	3+0	0	3+0	0	3+0	1
4	DF	(Scotland) SCO	Paul Hanlon	40	4	31+0	4	3+0	0	2+0	0	4+0	0
5	DF	(England) ENG	Michael Nelson	2	0	2+0	0	0+0	0	0+0	0	0+0	0
5	DF	(England) ENG	Liam Fontaine	38	2	29+0	1	2+0	0	3+0	0	4+0	1
6	DF	(Scotland) SCO	Jordon Forster	21	1	13+4	1	1+0	0	2+0	0	1+0	0
7	MF	(Scotland) SCO	Alex Harris	16	0	4+8	0	1+0	0	1+1	0	0+1	0
8	MF	(Scotland) SCO	Scott Robertson	41	6	32+0	6	2+0	0	3+0	0	4+0	0
9	FW	(France) FRA	Farid El Alagui	13	5	7+2	3	1+1	0	1+0	2	1+0	0
10	MF	(Scotland) SCO	Liam Craig	32	3	22+2	2	3+0	0	2+0	0	2+1	1
11	MF	(Scotland) SCO	Sam Stanton	28	3	8+14	1	1+0	0	0+2	1	0+3	1
14	FW	(Republic of Ireland) IRL	Paul Heffernan	13	1	4+7	1	0+1	0	0+1	0	0+0	0
16	DF	(Scotland) SCO	Lewis Stevenson	44	3	35+0	2	3+0	0	2+0	0	4+0	1
17	MF	(Wales) WAL	Owain Tudur Jones	1	0	0+0	0	0+1	0	0+0	0	0+0	0
17	FW	(Scotland) SCO	Martin Boyle	17	3	10+7	3	0+0	0	0+0	0	0+0	0
18	FW	(England) ENG	Jake Sinclair	3	0	1+2	0	0+0	0	0+0	0	0+0	0
18	DF	(Scotland) SCO	Keith Watson	8	0	7+1	0	0+0	0	0+0	0	0+0	0
19	MF	(Scotland) SCO	Danny Handling	24	3	12+8	2	1+0	1	2+0	0	1+0	0
20	MF	(Scotland) SCO	Scott Allan	42	2	29+3	2	2+1	0	2+1	0	4+0	0
22	DF	(Scotland) SCO	Callum Booth	12	1	6+5	1	0+0	0	1+0	0	0+0	0
22	MF	(Scotland) SCO	Fraser Fyvie	17	2	9+3	2	2+0	0	0+0	0	2+1	0
23	MF	(Scotland) SCO	Dylan McGeouch	26	3	17+3	2	1+1	0	1+0	0	2+1	1
24	FW	(Republic of the Congo) CGO	Dominique Malonga	31	16	20+4	13	2+0	0	2+0	3	2+1	0
27	MF	(Scotland) SCO	Lewis Allan	1	0	0+1	0	0+0	0	0+0	0	0+0	0
29	FW	(Ivory Coast) CIV	Franck Dja Djédjé	15	3	5+6	2	0+1	0	0+0	0	1+2	1
30	MF	(Scotland) SCO	Matthew Kennedy	16	1	5+8	0	0+0	0	1+1	1	0+1	0
31	GK	(Greece) GRE	Kleton Perntreou	2	0	1+1	0	0+0	0	0+0	0	0+0	0
35	FW	(Scotland) SCO	Jason Cummings	42	21	27+6	18	2+0	1	2+1	1	4+0	1
39	MF	(Scotland) SCO	Scott Martin	3	0	0+3	0	0+0	0	0+0	0	0+0	0
45	FW	(Scotland) SCO	Conner Duthie	1	0	0+1	0	0+0	0	0+0	0	0+0	0

a. Includes other competitive competitions, including the play-offs and the Challenge Cup.

=== Disciplinary record ===
As of 23 May 2015 (UTC)

Position	Nation	Number	Name	Championship		Other		League Cup		Scottish Cup		Total	
Position	Nation	Number	Name	Yellow card	Red card	Yellow card	Red card	Yellow card	Red card	Yellow card	Red card	Yellow card	Red card
1	(England)	GK	Mark Oxley	1	0	0	0	0	0	0	0	1	0
2	(Scotland)	DF	David Gray	4	0	1	0	0	0	0	0	5	0
4	(Scotland)	DF	Paul Hanlon	3	0	0	0	0	0	0	0	3	0
5	(England)	DF	Liam Fontaine	1	0	0	0	0	0	0	0	1	0
6	(Scotland)	DF	Jordon Forster	2	0	1	0	0	0	0	0	2	0
8	(Scotland)	MF	Scott Robertson	4	1	2	0	0	0	0	0	6	1
9	(France)	FW	Farid El Alagui	0	0	1	0	0	0	0	0	1	0
10	(Scotland)	MF	Liam Craig	6	0	2	0	0	0	0	0	8	0
14	(Republic of Ireland)	FW	Paul Heffernan	1	0	0	0	0	0	0	0	1	0
16	(Scotland)	DF	Lewis Stevenson	3	0	1	0	1	0	0	0	5	0
18	(Scotland)	MF	Keith Watson	1	0	0	0	0	0	0	0	1	0
19	(Scotland)	MF	Danny Handling	0	0	0	1	0	0	0	0	0	1
20	(Scotland)	MF	Scott Allan	6	0	1	0	1	0	0	0	8	0
22	(Scotland)	DF	Callum Booth	3	0	0	0	0	0	0	0	3	0
22	(Scotland)	MF	Fraser Fyvie	0	0	1	0	0	0	0	0	1	0
23	(Scotland)	MF	Dylan McGeouch	1	0	0	0	0	1	0	0	1	1
24	(Republic of the Congo)	FW	Dominique Malonga	1	0	0	0	0	0	0	1	1	1
29	(Ivory Coast)	FW	Franck Dja Djédjé	1	0	0	0	0	0	0	0	1	0
35	(Scotland)	FW	Jason Cummings	5	0	0	0	0	0	0	0	5	0
Total				41	1	10	1	2	1	0	1	53	4

== Club statistics ==
=== League table ===
Pos	Team	Pld	W	D	L	GF	GA	GD	Pts	Promotion, qualification or relegation
1	Heart of Midlothian (C, P)	36	29	4	3	96	26	+70	91	Promotion to the Premiership
2	Hibernian	36	21	7	8	70	32	+38	70	Qualification for the Premiership play-off semi-final
3	Rangers	36	19	10	7	69	39	+30	67	Qualification for the Premiership play-off quarter-final
4	Queen of the South	36	17	9	10	58	41	+17	60	Qualification for the Premiership play-off quarter-final
5	Falkirk	36	14	11	11	48	48	0	53	

Source: Soccerway
Rules for classification: 1) Points; 2) Goal difference; 3) Number of goals scored
(C) Champions; (P) Promoted

=== Division summary ===
Round	1	2	3	4	5	6	7	8	9	10	11	12	13	14	15	16	17	18	19	20	21	22	23	24	25	26	27	28	29	30	31	32	33	34	35	36
Ground	H	A	H	A	H	A	A	H	H	A	H	A	H	A	A	H	A	H	A	H	H	A	A	A	H	A	H	A	H	A	H	A	H	A	H	H
Result	W	L	L	L	W	L	W	D	D	W	D	W	D	W	L	W	W	W	D	D	W	W	D	W	W	W	W	W	L	L	L	W	W	W	W	W
Position	4	5	8	8	6	7	5	5	5	4	4	4	4	4	4	4	3	3	3	3	3	3	3	2	2	2	2	2	2	2	2	2	2	3	2	2

Updated to match(es) played on 2 May 2015. Source:
A = Away; H = Home; W = Win; D = Draw; L = Loss

=== Management statistics ===
Last updated on 23 May 2015

Name	From	To	P	W	D	L	Win% (Note: Win% is the percentage of matches won rounded to two decimal places.)
Alan Stubbs	5 August 2014	23 May 2015	46	27	7	12	58.70

== Transfers ==
=== Players in ===
Player	From	Fee
(Scotland) David Gray	(England) Burton Albion	Free
(France) Farid El Alagui	(England) Brentford	Free
(Scotland) Scott Allan	(England) West Bromwich Albion	Free
(England) Liam Fontaine	(England) Bristol City	Free
(Republic of the Congo) Dominique Malonga	(Italy) Cesena	Free
(Ivory Coast) Franck Dja Djédjé	(Belarus) FC Dinamo Minsk	Free
(Czech Republic) Tomáš Černý	(Greece) Ergotelis	Free
(Scotland) Fraser Fyvie	(England) Wigan Athletic	Free
(Scotland) Aaron Scott	(Scotland) Heart of Midlothian	Free

=== Players out ===
Player	To	Fee
(Scotland) James McPake	(Scotland) Dundee	Free
(Scotland) Kevin Thomson	(Scotland) Dundee	Free
(England) Ben Williams	(England) Bradford City	Free
(Scotland) Paul Cairney	(Scotland) Kilmarnock	Free
(Scotland) Bradley Donaldson	(Scotland) Livingston	Free
(Scotland) David Gold	(Scotland) Berwick Rangers	Free
(Scotland) Paul Grant	(Scotland) Livingston	Free
(Scotland) Dean Horribine	(Scotland) Berwick Rangers	Free
(Republic of Ireland) Alan Maybury	(Scotland) Falkirk	Free
(Scotland) Sean Murdoch		Free
(England) Tom Taiwo	(Scotland) Falkirk	Free
(England) James Collins	(Republic of Ireland) Shrewsbury Town	Undisclosed
(Northern Ireland) Ryan McGivern	(England) Port Vale	Undisclosed
(England) Michael Nelson	(England) Cambridge United	Free
(Wales) Owain Tudur Jones	(Scotland) Falkirk	Free
(Scotland) Tom Gardiner		Free
(Scotland) Max Todd		Free
(Scotland) Gareth McCaffrey		Free
(Republic of Ireland) Paul Heffernan	(Scotland) Dundee	Free

=== Loans in ===
Player	From
(England) Mark Oxley	(England) Hull City
(Scotland) Matthew Kennedy	(England) Everton
(Scotland) Dylan McGeouch	(Scotland) Celtic
(England) Jake Sinclair	(England) Southampton
(Scotland) Martin Boyle	(Scotland) Dundee
(Scotland) Keith Watson	(Scotland) Dundee United

=== Loans out ===
Player	To
(Scotland) Alex Harris	(Scotland) Dundee
(Scotland) Callum Booth	(Scotland) Partick Thistle
(Scotland) Lewis Allan	(Scotland) Dunfermline Athletic

== See also ==
- List of Hibernian F.C. seasons
