= 2012–13 Hibernian F.C. season =

Hibernian
2012–13 season
- Chairman: Rod Petrie
- Manager: Pat Fenlon
- Stadium: Easter Road
- Scottish Premier League: 7th
- League Cup: Second round
- Scottish Cup: Runners-up
- Top goalscorer: League: Leigh Griffiths (23); All: Leigh Griffiths (28)
- Highest home attendance: 16,805 (v Celtic, 29 December) (Note: There was an attendance of 17,052 for the 2012–13 Scottish Cup match against Hearts on 2 December 2012.)
- Lowest home attendance: 8,121 (v Kilmarnock, 27 February)
- Average home league attendance: 10,491 (up 582)
Home colours	Away colours	Third colours

The 2012–13 season was Hibernian's fourteenth consecutive season in the Scottish Premier League, having been promoted from the Scottish First Division at the end of the 1998–99 season. The club improved on its league performance in the previous season by finishing 7th in the 2012–13 Scottish Premier League, but were eliminated from the 2012–13 Scottish League Cup in the second round by Queen of the South. Hibernian progressed in the 2012–13 Scottish Cup to the 2013 Scottish Cup Final, but this was lost 3–0 to league champions Celtic.

== Fixtures and results ==
Legend

Win Draw Loss

=== Friendlies ===
Hibs announced their pre-season friendly programme on 20 June 2012. A fixture against Union Berlin was originally scheduled to be played at Easter Road, but was switched to Berlin. A match against Rapid Bucharest, scheduled for 11 July, was called off due to a waterlogged pitch. A fixture at East Fife was arranged instead.

14 July 2011 Friendly	East Fife	0–2	Hibernian	Bayview Stadium, Methil
		Scotland on Sunday	Sproule 52'; Clancy 79'	Referee: G Duncan

18 July 2012 Friendly	Lierse	1–1	Hibernian	Stadium Herentals, Herentals
	Hazurov 57'	Edinburgh Evening News	Caldwell 38'

21 July 2012 Friendly	OH Leuven	1–0	Hibernian	Den Dreef, Leuven
	Ibou 72'	sport.scotsman.com

22 July 2012 Friendly	Zealand Select XI	0–4	Hibernian	Sportcomplex, Vlissingen
		sport.scotsman.com	Stanton 24'; Handling 37', 52'; Caldwell 80'

24 July 2012 Friendly	Union Berlin	2–0	Hibernian	Stadion Alten Försterei, Berlin
	Parensen 50'; Quiring 92'	sport.scotsman.com

28 July 2012 Friendly	Hibernian	2–2	Huddersfield Town	Easter Road, Edinburgh
	Griffiths 27'; Sproule 62'	Hibernian FC	Novak 14'; Scannell 17'

=== Scottish Premier League ===
The league season began on 5 August 2012, with a 3–0 defeat against Dundee United at Tannadice. The first home game was an Edinburgh derby, which saw an improved performance by Hibs as the game ended in a 1–1 draw. Hibs earned their first win in the next game, away to St Mirren. A run of results without defeat followed, suggesting that Pat Fenlon had succeeded in rebuilding the team. Further positive results meant that Hibs reached the top of the league in November. This was followed by a run of four defeats in five matches, including a 3–2 loss to Motherwell despite having led 2–0. A win and a draw against Celtic and Hearts meant that Hibs went into the winter break with 32 points from 22 games, just one less point than they accrued in the whole of the 2011–12 season. A poor run of results after the winter break, however, meant that Hibs slipped into the bottom half of the league at the split. The match against Kilmarnock on 5 May was abandoned after 54 minutes played because a spectator had fallen gravely ill and required emergency medical assistance. A run of victories towards the end of the season meant that Hibs finished in seventh place.

5 August 2012 SPL	Dundee United	3–0	Hibernian	Tannadice Park, Dundee
	Russell 3'; Daly 74'; Gardyne 90'	BBC Sport		Attendance: 7,267; Referee: Thomson

12 August 2012 SPL	Hibernian	1–1	Heart of Midlothian	Easter Road, Edinburgh
	Griffiths 45'	BBC Sport	Driver 29'	Attendance: 12,887; Referee: Collum

18 August 2012 SPL	St Mirren	1–2	Hibernian	St Mirren Park, Paisley
	Thompson 63'	BBC Sport	Griffiths 15', 61'	Attendance: 5,039; Referee: Charleston

25 August 2012 SPL	Hibernian	2–0	St Johnstone	Easter Road, Edinburgh
	Hanlon 45'; Doyle 53'	BBC Sport		Attendance: 9,639; Referee: Clancy

1 September 2012 SPL	Celtic	2–2	Hibernian	Celtic Park, Glasgow
	Lustig 10'; McPake 69' (own goal)	BBC Sport	Clancy 53'; Cairney 73'	Attendance: 45,867; Referee: Brines

15 September 2012 SPL	Hibernian	2–1	Kilmarnock	Easter Road, Edinburgh
	Griffiths 14', 45' (pen.)	BBC Sport	Racchi 32'	Attendance: 9,723; Referee: McLean

22 September 2012 SPL	Hibernian	2–2	Inverness CT	Easter Road, Edinburgh
	Doyle 23'; Wotherspoon 31'	BBC Sport	Pepper 39'; Foran 81'	Attendance: 9,908; Referee: Norris

29 September 2012 SPL	Aberdeen	2–1	Hibernian	Pittodrie Stadium, Aberdeen
	McGinn 4'; Rae 71'	BBC Sport	Doyle 33'	Attendance: 8,282; Referee: Murray

6 October 2012 SPL	Hibernian	3–0	Dundee	Easter Road, Edinburgh
	Doyle 29'; Griffiths 51' (pen.); Wotherspoon 74'	BBC Sport		Attendance: 10,163; Referee: Collum

20 October 2012 SPL	Ross County	3–2	Hibernian	Victoria Park, Dingwall
	Kettlewell 9'; Vigurs 34'; McMenamin 83'	BBC Sport	Griffiths 6'; McPake 45'	Attendance: 4,070; Referee: McLean

26 October 2012 SPL	Motherwell	0–4	Hibernian	Fir Park, Motherwell
		BBC Sport	Wotherspoon 28'; Griffiths 64' (pen.), 74' (pen.); Handling 96'	Attendance: 5,301; Referee: O'Reilly

3 November 2012 SPL	Hibernian	2–1	St Mirren	Easter Road, Edinburgh
	Griffiths 37', 65'	BBC Sport	McLean 32'	Attendance: 10,358; Referee: Muir

11 November 2012 SPL	Hibernian	2–1	Dundee United	Easter Road, Edinburgh
	Griffiths 19'; Doyle 51'	BBC Sport	Mackay-Steven 53'	Attendance: 10,596; Referee: Thomson

17 November 2012 SPL	Dundee	3–1	Hibernian	Dens Park, Dundee
	Benedictus 21'; Milne 47'; McBride 52' (pen.)	BBC Sport	Griffiths 90'	Attendance: 6,743; Referee: Colvin

24 November 2012 SPL	Hibernian	0–1	Aberdeen	Easter Road, Edinburgh
		BBC Sport	McGinn 77'	Attendance: 12,007; Referee: Madden

28 November 2012 SPL	St Johnstone	0–1	Hibernian	McDiarmid Park, Perth
		BBC Sport	Cairney 82'	Attendance: 3,266; Referee: Thomson

8 December 2012 SPL	Inverness CT	3–0	Hibernian	Caledonian Stadium, Inverness
	Draper 13'; Foran 76'; McKay 87'	BBC Sport		Attendance: 3,422; Referee: Crawford

15 December 2012 SPL	Hibernian	2–3	Motherwell	Easter Road, Edinburgh
	Doyle 41', 55'	BBC Sport	Murphy 64', 80'; McHugh 88'	Attendance: 8,817; Referee: McLean

23 December 2012 SPL	Kilmarnock	1–1	Hibernian	Rugby Park, Kilmarnock
	Heffernan 6'	BBC Sport	Doyle 26'	Attendance: 4,028; Referee: Madden

26 December 2012 SPL	Hibernian	0–1	Ross County	Easter Road, Edinburgh
		BBC Sport	Brittain 57'	Attendance: 8,980; Referee: Beaton

29 December 2012 SPL	Hibernian	1–0	Celtic	Easter Road, Edinburgh
	Griffiths 9'	BBC Sport		Attendance: 16,805; Referee: Thomson

3 January 2013 SPL	Heart of Midlothian	0–0	Hibernian	Tynecastle Stadium, Edinburgh
		BBC Sport		Attendance: 17,062; Referee: Collum

19 January 2013 SPL	Hibernian	1–1	Dundee	Easter Road, Edinburgh
	Griffiths 49'	BBC Sport	Baird 8'	Attendance: 10,386; Referee: Charleston

27 January 2013 SPL	Aberdeen	0–0	Hibernian	Pittodrie Stadium, Aberdeen
		BBC Sport		Attendance: 7,184; Referee: Thomson

30 January 2013 SPL	Ross County	1–0	Hibernian	Victoria Park, Dingwall
	Sproule 36'	BBC Sport		Attendance: 3,055; Referee: Madden

11 February 2013 SPL	Hibernian	1–3	St Johnstone	Easter Road, Edinburgh
	Griffiths 82'	BBC Sport	Vine 23', 26'; Cregg 58'	Attendance: 8,735; Referee: Clancy

16 February 2013 SPL	St Mirren	0–1	Hibernian	St Mirren Park, Paisley
		BBC Sport	Griffiths 72' (pen.)	Attendance: 4,524; Referee: Collum

24 February 2013 SPL	Dundee United	2–2	Hibernian	Tannadice Park, Dundee
	Rankin 6'; Russell 86' (pen.)	BBC Sport	McPake 27'; Griffiths 51'	Attendance: 6,160; Referee: Muir

27 February 2013 SPL	Hibernian	2–2	Kilmarnock	Easter Road, Edinburgh
	McGivern 85'; Griffiths 88'	BBC Sport	Clingan 46'; Winchester 86'	Attendance: 8,121; Referee: McKendrick

10 March 2013 SPL	Hibernian	0–0	Heart of Midlothian	Easter Road, Edinburgh
		BBC Sport		Attendance: 15,007; Referee: Norris

15 March 2013 SPL	Motherwell	4–1	Hibernian	Fir Park, Motherwell
	Higdon 48'; McFadden 54'; Higginbotham 67'; Hateley 84'	BBC Sport	Taiwo 23'	Attendance: 5,108; Referee: Collum

30 March 2013 SPL	Hibernian	1–2	Inverness CT	Easter Road, Edinburgh
	Griffiths 59'	BBC Sport	Draper 48'; A. Shinnie 65'	Attendance: 10,055; Referee: Thomson

6 April 2013 SPL	Celtic	3–0	Hibernian	Celtic Park, Glasgow
	Commons 16', 52'; Lustig 61'	BBC Sport		Referee: Beaton

23 April 2013 SPL	Hibernian	0–0	Aberdeen	Easter Road, Edinburgh
		BBC Sport		Attendance: 8,362; Referee: McLean

27 April 2013 SPL	Hibernian	3–3	St Mirren	Easter Road, Edinburgh
	Griffiths 31', 86'; Caldwell 67'	BBC Sport	Gonçalves 60'; McAusland 78', 82'	Attendance: 9,264; Referee: Crawford

5 May 2013 SPL	Kilmarnock	A – A	Hibernian	Rugby Park, Kilmarnock
	Boyd 31'	BBC Sport	Harris 21'	Referee: Clancy

12 May 2013 SPL	Heart of Midlothian	1–2	Hibernian	Tynecastle Stadium, Edinburgh
	Barr 45'	BBC Sport	Griffiths 48'; Caldwell 90'	Attendance: 15,994; Referee: McLean

15 May 2013 SPL	Kilmarnock	1–3	Hibernian	Rugby Park, Kilmarnock
	Ashcroft 57'	BBC Sport	Robertson 10'; Doyle 86', 90'	Attendance: 3,198; Referee: Charleston

18 May 2013 SPL	Hibernian	1–0	Dundee	Easter Road, Edinburgh
	Wotherspoon 79'	BBC Sport		Attendance: 9,522; Referee: Colvin

=== Scottish League Cup ===
As a Scottish Premier League club that had not qualified for European competition, Hibs entered the 2012–13 Scottish League Cup in the second round. They were drawn away to Second Division club Queen of the South. Hibs manager Pat Fenlon took a risk by resting key players, including captain James McPake, and this backfired as Queen of the South won 2–0 at Palmerston Park.

28 August 2012 Second round	Queen of the South	2–0	Hibernian	Palmerston Park, Dumfries
	Clark 12'; Reilly 42'	BBC Sport		Attendance: 2,658; Referee: Madden

=== Scottish Cup ===
Hibs entered the 2012–13 Scottish Cup in the fourth round, with a home tie against Edinburgh derby rivals Hearts. Hibs captain James McPake welcomed the draw, an immediate repeat of the 2012 Scottish Cup Final. A late deflected goal gave Hibs a 1–0 victory, ending a 12 match unbeaten run for Hearts in the derby. Hibs were then drawn at home against Scottish Premier League opposition for a second time, being paired with the winner of a replayed tie between Aberdeen and Motherwell. A long-range strike by Gary Deegan and a penalty save by Ben Williams were key contributions as Hibs defeated Aberdeen 1–0. The quarter-final draw gave Hibs an away tie against Kilmarnock. Leigh Griffiths scored a hat-trick as Hibs progressed to the semi-finals with a 4–2 victory at Rugby Park.

Hibs were drawn against First Division club Falkirk in the semi-finals. Hibs went into the semi-final on a poor run of form, which had cost them a place in the top half of the SPL. Falkirk took a 3–0 lead before half-time, but Hibs produced "one of the great Scottish Cup fightbacks" to win 4–3 after extra time. Celtic also won 4–3 in their semi-final, against Dundee United, to set up the 2013 Scottish Cup Final match. Despite Hibs having a bright start to the match, poor defending allowed Gary Hooper to score two first half goals for Celtic. Hibs rarely threatened another comeback and Joe Ledley scored late on to clinch a 3–0 win for Celtic.

2 December 2012 Fourth round	Hibernian	1–0	Heart of Midlothian	Easter Road, Edinburgh
	Wotherspoon 84' (Note: Media reports credited the goal as an own goal by Hearts defender Marius Zaliukas, but the referee's report listed it as a goal by Wotherspoon.)	BBC Sport		Attendance: 17,052; Referee: Murray

3 February 2013 Fifth round	Hibernian	1–0	Aberdeen	Easter Road, Edinburgh
	Deegan 49'	BBC Sport		Attendance: 11,877; Referee: Brines

3 March 2013 Quarter final	Kilmarnock	2–4	Hibernian	Rugby Park, Kilmarnock
	Dayton 26'; Heffernan 72' (pen.)	BBC Sport	Griffiths 15', 82', 89' (pen.); Done 39'	Attendance: 7,272; Referee: Beaton

13 April 2013 Semi final	Hibernian	4–3 (a.e.t.)	Falkirk	Hampden Park, Glasgow
	Harris 51'; Griffiths 78', 115'; Doyle 83'	BBC Sport	Sibbald 6'; Fulton 18'; Alston 30'	Attendance: 22,410; Referee: Brines

26 May 2013 Final	Hibernian	0–3	Celtic	Hampden Park, Glasgow
		BBC Sport	Hooper 8', 31'; Ledley 80'	Attendance: 51,254; Referee: Collum

== Player statistics ==
During the 2012–13 season, Hibs used 30 different players in competitive games. The table below shows the number of appearances and goals scored by each player.

As of 18:40, 28 May 2013 (UTC)

No.	Pos	Nat	Player	Total		Premier League		League Cup		Scottish Cup	
No.	Pos	Nat	Player	Apps	Goals	Apps	Goals	Apps	Goals	Apps	Goals
1	GK	(England) ENG	Ben Williams	43	0	37	0	1	0	5	0
2	DF	(Republic of Ireland) IRL	Tim Clancy	21	1	19	1	1	0	1	0
3	DF	(Scotland) SCO	Callum Booth	1	0	0	0	1	0	0	0
3	DF	(Northern Ireland) NIR	Ryan McGivern	32	1	27	1	0	0	5	0
4	DF	(Scotland) SCO	Paul Hanlon	39	1	34	1	1	0	4	0
5	DF	(England) ENG	Sean O'Hanlon	2	0	1	0	1	0	0	0
6	DF	(Northern Ireland) NIR	James McPake	32	2	29	2	0	0	3	0
7	MF	(Republic of Ireland) IRL	Gary Deegan	23	1	20	0	1	0	2	1
8	MF	(Honduras) HON	Jorge Claros	40	0	34	0	1	0	5	0
9	FW	(Scotland) SCO	Leigh Griffiths	42	28	36	23	1	0	5	5
10	FW	(Republic of Ireland) IRL	Eoin Doyle	41	11	36	10	1	0	4	1
11	MF	(Scotland) SCO	Paul Cairney	33	2	29	2	1	0	3	0
14	MF	(Scotland) SCO	David Wotherspoon	38	5	34	4	1	0	3	1
16	DF	(Scotland) SCO	Lewis Stevenson	33	0	29	0	0	0	4	0
17	MF	(England) ENG	Matt Done	9	1	7	0	0	0	2	1
17	MF	(Northern Ireland) NIR	Ivan Sproule	11	0	10	0	0	0	1	0
18	DF	(Republic of Ireland) IRL	Alan Maybury	32	0	27	0	1	0	4	0
19	DF	(The Gambia) GAM	Pa Saikou Kujabi	1	0	0	0	1	0	0	0
20	DF	(Wales) WAL	David Stephens	1	0	1	0	0	0	0	0
20	MF	(England) ENG	Tom Taiwo	30	1	26	1	0	0	4	0
24	FW	(Scotland) SCO	Danny Handling	18	1	15	1	0	0	3	0
26	MF	(Scotland) SCO	Sam Stanton	1	0	1	0	0	0	0	0
28	MF	(Scotland) SCO	Scott Robertson	15	1	12	1	0	0	3	0
29	FW	(Scotland) SCO	Ross Caldwell	19	2	17	2	0	0	2	0
31	GK	(Scotland) SCO	Sean Murdoch	1	0	1	0	0	0	0	0
32	FW	(Finland) FIN	Shefki Kuqi	14	0	13	0	1	0	0	0
33	MF	(Scotland) SCO	Alex Harris	14	1	11	0	0	0	3	1
34	MF	(Scotland) SCO	Dean Horribine	1	0	1	0	0	0	0	0
37	DF	(Scotland) SCO	Jordon Forster	4	0	3	0	0	0	1	0
38	MF	(Scotland) SCO	Kevin Thomson	8	0	6	0	0	0	2	0

== Team statistics ==
=== League table ===
Pos	Team	Pld	W	D	L	GF	GA	GD	Pts	Qualification or relegation
5	Ross County	38	13	14	11	47	48	−1	53	
6	Dundee United	38	11	14	13	51	62	−11	47 (Note: Teams in the bottom half at the time of the split may not overtake a team in the top 6 at the time of the split.)	
7	Hibernian	38	13	12	13	49	52	−3	51	Qualification for the Europa League second qualifying round (Note: Since the winners of 2012–13 Scottish Cup, Celtic, qualified for European competition based on league position, the runners–up Hibernian secured a spot in Europa League second qualifying round.)
8	Aberdeen	38	11	15	12	41	43	−2	48	
9	Kilmarnock	38	11	12	15	52	53	−1	45	

Source: SPFL Archive
Rules for classification: 1) points; 2) goal difference; 3) number of goals scored.

=== Division summary ===
Round	1	2	3	4	5	6	7	8	9	10	11	12	13	14	15	16	17	18	19	20	21	22	23	24	25	26	27	28	29	30	31	32	33	34	35	36	37	38
Ground	A	H	A	H	A	H	H	A	H	A	A	H	H	A	H	A	A	H	A	H	H	A	H	A	A	H	A	A	H	H	A	H	A	H	H	A	A	H
Result	L	D	W	W	D	W	D	L	W	L	W	W	W	L	L	W	L	L	D	L	W	D	D	D	L	L	W	D	D	D	L	L	L	D	D	W	W	W
Position	12	12	7	2	3	2	2	5	2	4	2	2	1	2	3	2	4	4	4	4	4	4	4	4	4	5	4	6	6	6	6	9	9	9	9	9	7	7

Updated to match(es) played on 17:12, 18 May 2013 (UTC). Source:
A = Away; H = Home; W = Win; D = Draw; L = Loss

== Transfers ==
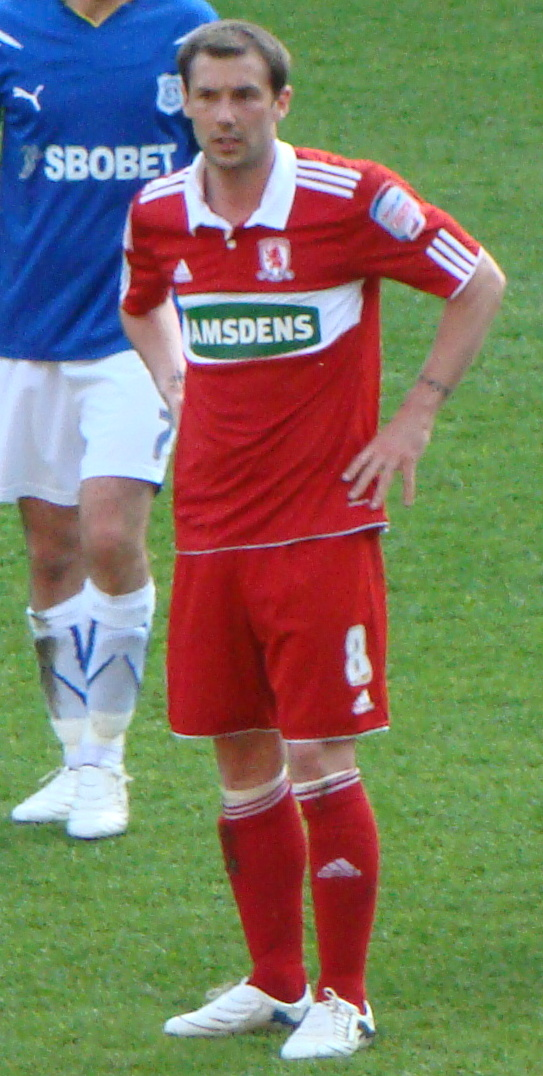
Kevin Thomson, seen here playing for Middlesbrough, returned to Hibs in March 2013.

Hibs narrowly avoided relegation from the Scottish Premier League during the 2011–12 season. To do this, the club signed several players on loan during the January 2012 transfer window, all of whom returned to their parent clubs at the end of the season. After the 5–1 defeat by Hearts in the 2012 Scottish Cup Final, the Hibs board of directors acknowledged the necessity of rebuilding the squad. Pat Fenlon attempted to strengthen the defence by signing goalkeeper Ben Williams and defenders James McPake and Tim Clancy.

Later in the window, Fenlon complained that other Scottish clubs, particularly the relaunched Rangers, were outbidding Hibs for players. Fenlon was able to sign veteran Finnish striker Shefki Kuqi to provide an experienced target man. Towards the end of the window, Fenlon commented that he was looking for more midfielders, as he was left without cover during a match against St Mirren. Defender Ryan McGivern was signed on loan from Manchester City on the last day of the window, but Fenlon said afterwards he was still looking to strengthen one area of the squad. He managed to strengthen the central midfield position in September, after signing free agent Tom Taiwo to a two-year deal.

Approaching the January transfer window, Fenlon said that his main priority was an attempt to secure the services of the three loaned players (Griffiths, McGivern and Jorge Claros). It was confirmed on 16 January that the deals for Griffiths and McGivern had been extended to the end of the season. Former Hibs player Kevin Thomson, who had been released by Middlesbrough at the end of January, began training with Hibs in February. He signed a short-term contract with Hibs in March, going without salary.

=== Players in ===
Player	From	Fee
(Republic of Ireland) Tim Clancy	(Scotland) Motherwell	Free
(Northern Ireland) James McPake	(England) Coventry City	Free
(Scotland) Paul Cairney	(Scotland) Partick Thistle	Free
(England) Ben Williams	(England) Colchester United	Free
(Republic of Ireland) Gary Deegan	(England) Coventry City	Undisclosed
(Republic of Ireland) Alan Maybury	(Scotland) St Johnstone	Free
(Finland) Shefki Kuqi	(England) Oldham Athletic	Free
(England) Tom Taiwo	(England) Carlisle United	Free
(Scotland) Sean Murdoch	(England) Accrington Stanley	Free
(Scotland) Scott Robertson	(England) Blackpool	Free
(Scotland) Kevin Thomson	(England) Middlesbrough	Free

=== Players out ===
Player	To	Fee
(Scotland) Ian Murray	(Scotland) Dumbarton (player/manager)	Free
(Scotland) Scott Taggart	(Scotland) Greenock Morton	Free
(Scotland) Sean Welsh	(Scotland) Partick Thistle	Free
(Republic of Ireland) Graham Stack	(England) Barnet	Free
(Scotland) Garry O'Connor	(Russia) Tom Tomsk	Free
(England) Isaiah Osbourne	(England) Blackpool	Undisclosed
(Scotland) Mark Brown	(Scotland) Ross County	Free
(Scotland) Phil Addison	(England) Berwick Rangers	Free
(England) Marc Lancaster	(England) Berwick Rangers	Free
(Wales) David Stephens	(England) Barnet	Free
(England) Sean O'Hanlon	(England) Carlisle United	Free
(Northern Ireland) Ivan Sproule	(Scotland) Ross County	Free
(Scotland) Danny Galbraith	(Republic of Ireland) Limerick	Free

=== Loans in ===
Player	From
(Scotland) Leigh Griffiths	(England) Wolverhampton Wanderers
(Northern Ireland) Ryan McGivern	(England) Manchester City
(England) Matt Done	(England) Barnsley

=== Loans out ===
Player	To
(Scotland) Martin Scott	(Scotland) Ross County
(Scotland) Jordon Forster	(Scotland) East Fife
(Scotland) Scott Smith	(Scotland) East Fife
(Scotland) Callum Booth	(Scotland) Livingston
(Wales) Calum Antell	(Scotland) East Fife
(Scotland) Harry Monaghan	(Scotland) Annan Athletic
(Scotland) Scott Smith	(Scotland) Dumbarton
(Scotland) Sam Stanton	(Scotland) Cowdenbeath
(Scotland) Euan Smith	(Scotland) Arbroath

== Deaths ==
- 11 July 2012: Bobby Nicol, 76, Hibernian, Barnsley and Berwick Rangers wing half.
- October 2012: Jim Rollo, 74, Hibernian, Oldham Athletic, Southport and Bradford City goalkeeper.

== See also ==
- List of Hibernian F.C. seasons
