= Shaun Rutherford =

Scottish footballer

Personal information
- Date of birth: 3 October 1996 (age 30)
- Place of birth: Edinburgh, Scotland
- Position: Defender

Team information
- Current team: Bo'ness United

Senior career*
Years	Team	Apps	(Gls)
2013–2015	Livingston	16	(0)
2015–2016	Queen of the South	1	(0)
2016	→ Arbroath (loan)	6	(0)
2016–2018	Cowdenbeath	34	(0)
2021–2023	Tranent Juniors		
2023–	Bo'ness United		
- * Club domestic league appearances and goals as of 14:24, 31 October 2017

Shaun Rutherford (born 3 October 1996) is a Scottish footballer who played as a defender for Bo'ness United. Rutherford started his career with Livingston, and has also played for Queen of the South, Cowdenbeath, Tranent Juniors and Arbroath on loan.

== Career ==
Rutherford began his career at Livingston and was included in the first team squad on 28 September 2013, as an unused substitute in a 5–1 home win against Cowdenbeath in the Scottish Championship. Rutherford played on 3 May 2014 in the final league match of the campaign in a 2–0 home win against Raith Rovers, replacing Marc McNulty in added time.

On 17 June 2015, Rutherford moved to Queen of the South. Rutherford made his debut for Queens away to Rangers at Ibrox on 17 October 2015, replacing Alex Harris for the final three minutes of the 2–1 defeat. Rutherford moved out on loan to Arbroath of Scottish League Two on 8 January 2016, initially for the remainder of the season. Rutherford made his debut for the Smokies on 8 February 2016, playing the entirety of a 1–1 draw against Stirling Albion at Gayfield Park. Arbroath sacked their manager Todd Lumsden on 6 March 2016, after a run of six games without a win. After the former Forfar manager Dick Campbell replaced Lumsden on 8 March 2016, Rutherford returned to Dumfries earlier than scheduled after Arbroath's 2–1 defeat at Hampden Park on 19 March 2016 against Queen's Park.

Rutherford left Palmerston Park at the end of the 2015–16 season, subsequently signing for Scottish League Two side Cowdenbeath in June 2016.

== Career statistics ==
As of match played 28 October 2017

Appearances and goals by club, season and competition
Club	Season	League			Scottish Cup		League Cup		Other		Total	
Club	Season	Division	Apps	Goals	Apps	Goals	Apps	Goals	Apps	Goals	Apps	Goals
Livingston	2013–14	Championship	1	0	0	0	0	0	0	0	1	0
Livingston	2014–15	Championship	11	0	0	0	1	0	2 (Note: Appearances in the Scottish Challenge Cup)	0	16	0
Livingston	Livingston total		12	0	0	0	1	0	2	0	15	0
Queen of the South	2015–16	Championship	1	0	0	0	0	0	0	0	1	0
Arbroath (loan)	2015–16	League Two	6	0	0	0	0	0	0	0	6	0
Cowdenbeath	2016–17	League Two	27	0	1	0	3	0	1	0	32	0
Cowdenbeath	2017–18	League Two	7	0	0	0	4	0	0	0	11	0
Cowdenbeath	Cowdenbeath total		34	0	1	0	7	0	1	0	43	0
Career total			53	0	1	0	8	0	3	0	65	0
