= 2015–16 Queen of the South F.C. season =

Queen of the South
2015–16 season
- Chairman: Billy Hewitson
- Manager: James Fowler; Gavin Skelton
- Stadium: Palmerston Park
- Scottish Championship: 7th
- Challenge Cup: Second round
- League Cup: Second round
- Scottish Cup: Fourth round
- Top goalscorer: League: Derek Lyle (13); All: Derek Lyle (17)
- Highest home attendance: 5,858 vs. Rangers, 30 August 2015
- Lowest home attendance: 1,047 vs. Raith Rovers, 11 December 2015
- Average home league attendance: 2,115

The 2015–16 season is Queen of the South's third consecutive season back in the second tier of Scottish football and their third season in the Scottish Championship, having been promoted as champions from the Scottish Second Division at the end of the 2012–13 season. Queens will also be competing in the Challenge Cup, League Cup and the Scottish Cup.

== Summary ==
Queen of the South finished seventh in the Scottish Championship.

The club reached the second round of the Challenge Cup, the second round of the League Cup and the fourth round of the Scottish Cup.

=== Management ===
The club began the 2015–16 season under the management of James Fowler and he remained in charge until 18 April 2016, when he left the club by mutual consent, two days after a 2–2 draw at already relegated Alloa Athletic. Queens objective was to finish in fourth and reach the play-offs for the third consecutive season. Gavin Skelton, who had been Fowler's assistant, was appointed caretaker manager alongside ex-club captain Jim Thomson, for the final two league matches of the season.

== Results & fixtures ==
Win Draw Loss Abandoned or Postponed

=== Preseason ===
4 July 2015 Friendly	Clyde	1 – 3	Queen of the South	Broadwood Stadium
12:00	McLaughlin 14'	QOSFC Report; Clyde FC Report	Lyle 16'; Trialist 67'; Conroy 88'	Attendance: Closed doors

8 July 2015 Friendly	Queen of the South	1 – 2	Wigan Athletic	La Manga Stadium
12:00	Kidd 61'	QOSFC Report; Wigan Athletic FC Report	A. Trialist 1'; Power 20'	Attendance: Closed doors

11 July 2015 Friendly	Stirling Albion	1 – 2	Queen of the South	University of Stirling
15:00	Brownlie 15' (o.g.); Johnston 80'	QOSFC Report; Stirling Albion FC Report	Kidd 44'	Attendance: Closed doors

14 July 2015 Friendly	Queen of the South	2 – 2	Kilmarnock	Palmerston Park
19:30	Hilson 17'; Conroy 80'	QOSFC Report; Kilmarnock FC Report; Groundhopper2000 Report	McKenzie 56', 78'	Attendance: 900; Referee: Muir

19 July 2015 Friendly	St Johnstone	5 – 1	Queen of the South	McDiarmid Park
12:00	Lappin 3'; Sutton 44'; Kane 86', 88', 90'	QOSFC Report	Russell 59' (pen.)	Attendance: Closed doors

=== Scottish Championship ===
8 August 2015 ScoChamp Match 1	Queen of the South	3 – 1	Alloa Athletic	Palmerston Park
15:00	Lyle 5'; Russell 29', 38'	QOSFC Report	Flannigan 49'	Attendance: 1,726; Referee: Anderson

15 August 2015 ScoChamp Match 2	Livingston	0 – 1	Queen of the South	Tony Macaroni Arena
15:00		QOSFC Report	Kidd 65'	Attendance: 856; Referee: Salmond

22 August 2015 ScoChamp Match 3	Dumbarton	0 – 2	Queen of the South	Cheaper Insurance Direct Stadium
15:00		QOSFC Report	Russell 41'; Lyle 68'	Attendance: 943; Referee: Colvin

30 August 2015 ScoChamp Match 4	Queen of the South	1 – 5	Rangers	Palmerston Park
12:30	Lyle (red card) 48'; Smith 81'	QOSFC Report	Halliday 28'; Waghorn 52' (pen.), 76' (pen.); Holt 59'; McKay 64'	Attendance: 5,858; Referee: Madden

5 September 2015 ScoChamp Match 5	Queen of the South	0 – 2	St Mirren	Palmerston Park
15:00		QOSFC Report	Kelly 7'; Thompson 29'	Attendance: 2,001; Referee: Finnie

12 September 2015 ScoChamp Match 6	Raith Rovers	1 – 0	Queen of the South	Stark's Park
15:00	Benedictus 78'	QOSFC Report		Attendance: 1,527; Referee: Clancy

19 September 2015 ScoChamp Match 7	Queen of the South	2 – 2	Greenock Morton	Palmerston Park
15:00	Lyle 45'; Gasparotto 81' (o.g.)	QOSFC Report	Higgins 7' (o.g.); Johnstone 65'	Attendance: 1,565; Referee: Dallas

25 September 2015 ScoChamp Match 8	Falkirk	0 – 0	Queen of the South	Falkirk Stadium
19:45		QOSFC Report		Attendance: 3,757; Referee: Salmond

3 October 2015 ScoChamp Match 9	Queen of the South	0 – 3	Hibernian	Palmerston Park
15:00		QOSFC Report	Cummings 3'; Henderson 41'; Boyle 89'	Attendance: 2,745; Referee: Aitken

10 October 2015 ScoChamp Match 10	Queen of the South	1 – 0	Greenock Morton	Palmerston Park
15:00	Lyle 14'	QOSFC Report		Attendance: 1,583; Referee: McKendrick

17 October 2015 ScoChamp Match 11	Rangers	2 – 1	Queen of the South	Ibrox Stadium
15:00	Holt 53'; Waghorn 90'	QOSFC Report	Lyle 35'	Attendance: 44,133; Referee: Cook

24 October 2015 ScoChamp Match 12	Queen of the South	1 – 4	Livingston	Palmerston Park
15:00	Hilson 27'	QOSFC Report	Pittman 50'; White 67'; Buchanan 75', 85'	Attendance: 1,485; Referee: Walsh

31 October 2015 ScoChamp Match 13	Alloa Athletic	1 – 2	Queen of the South	Indodrill Stadium
15:00	Holmes 1'	QOSFC Report	Oliver 46', 55'	Attendance: 616; Referee: Thomson

7 November 2015 ScoChamp Match 14	Queen of the South	1 – 0	Dumbarton	Palmerston Park
15:00	Heffernan 52'	QOSFC Report		Attendance: 1,465; Referee: Muir

14 November 2015 ScoChamp Match 15	Greenock Morton	2 – 0	Queen of the South	Cappielow Park
15:00	Johnstone 51', 62'	QOSFC Report		Attendance: 1,849; Referee: Northcroft

21 November 2015 ScoChamp Match 16	Queen of the South	2 – 2	Falkirk	Palmerston Park
15:00	Lyle 35' (pen.); Russell 84'	QOSFC Report	Vaulks 17'; Miller 83'	Attendance: 1,728; Referee: McLean

5 December 2015 ScoChamp	St Mirren	P – P	Queen of the South	Paisley 2021 Stadium
15:00		BBC Sport News
Note: Postponed due to waterlogged pitch

11 December 2015 ScoChamp Match 17	Queen of the South	1 – 1	Raith Rovers	Palmerston Park
19:45	Russell 48'	QOSFC Report	Thomson 22' (o.g.)	Attendance: 1,047; Referee: Charleston

19 December 2015 ScoChamp Match 18	Hibernian	1 – 0	Queen of the South	Easter Road
15:00	Malonga 90'	QOSFC Report		Attendance: 9,163; Referee: Colvin

2 January 2016 ScoChamp Match 19	Livingston	0 – 2	Queen of the South	Tony Macaroni Arena
15:00		QOSFC Report	Lyle 65'; Russell 77'	Attendance: 958; Referee: Collum

16 January 2016 ScoChamp	Dumbarton	P – P	Queen of the South	Cheaper Insurance Direct Stadium
15:00		BBC Sport News
Note: Postponed due to frozen pitch

23 January 2016 ScoChamp Match 20	Queen of the South	1 – 0	Alloa Athletic	Palmerston Park
15:00	Russell 41'	QOSFC Report		Attendance: 1,559; Referee: Beaton

30 January 2016 ScoChamp	Raith Rovers	P – P	Queen of the South	Stark's Park
15:00		BBC Sport News
Note: Postponed due to waterlogged pitch

6 February 2016 ScoChamp Match 21	St Mirren	1 – 0	Queen of the South	Paisley 2021 Stadium
15:00	Mallan 25'	QOSFC Report		Attendance: 2,706; Referee: Allan

13 February 2016 ScoChamp Match 22	Queen of the South	1 – 0	St Mirren	Palmerston Park
15:00	Harris 65'	QOSFC Report	Mallan (yellow card) 76' (yellow-red card) 90'	Attendance: 1,923; Referee: Cook

21 February 2016 ScoChamp Match 23	Queen of the South	0 – 1	Rangers	Palmerston Park
16:00		QOSFC Report	Miller 64'	Attendance: 5,449; Referee: Finnie

27 February 2016 ScoChamp Match 24	Falkirk	3 – 1	Queen of the South	Falkirk Stadium
15:00	Baird 53'; Dowie 65' (o.g.); Alston 85'	QOSFC Report	Higgins 43'	Attendance: 3,918; Referee: Collum

1 March 2016 ScoChamp Match 25	Queen of the South	1 – 0	Hibernian	Palmerston Park
19:45	Murdoch 78'	QOSFC Report		Attendance: 2,017; Referee: Dallas

8 March 2016 ScoChamp Match 26	Raith Rovers	2 – 0	Queen of the South	Stark's Park
19:45	Stewart 32'; Craigen 44' (pen.)	QOSFC Report		Attendance: 1,398; Referee: Walsh

12 March 2016 ScoChamp Match 27	St Mirren	2 – 1	Queen of the South	Paisley 2021 Stadium
15:00	Mallan 30' (pen.); Tapping 63' (o.g.)	QOSFC Report	Oliver 62'	Attendance: 3,888; Referee: Muir

15 March 2016 ScoChamp Match 28	Greenock Morton	3 – 2	Queen of the South	Cappielow Park
19:45	Johnstone 8', 22'; McMullan 29'	QOSFC Report	Hilson 69'; Oliver 78'	Attendance: 1,175; Referee: D Robertson

19 March 2016 ScoChamp Match 29	Queen of the South	6 – 0	Dumbarton	Palmerston Park
15:00	Brownlie 34'; Lyle 43', 52'; Harris 69', 73'; Russell 88'	QOSFC Report		Attendance: 1,459; Referee: Beaton

26 March 2016 ScoChamp Match 30	Rangers	4 – 3	Queen of the South	Ibrox Stadium
15:00	Forrester 14'; O'Halloran 46'; Halliday 51'; Tavernier 55'	QOSFC Report	Russell 25' (pen.); Oliver 57'; Millar 90'	Attendance: 46,117; Referee: Allan

2 April 2016 ScoChamp Match 31	Queen of the South	2 – 2	Falkirk	Palmerston Park
15:00	Lyle 73'; Russell 90'	QOSFC Report	Alston 45'; Baird 52'	Attendance: 1,530; Referee: Cook

9 April 2016 ScoChamp Match 32	Queen of the South	1 – 2	Raith Rovers	Palmerston Park
15:00	Hilson 53'	QOSFC Report	Benedictus 8'; Barr 63'	Attendance: 1,511; Referee: Clancy

12 April 2016 ScoChamp Match 33	Dumbarton	4 – 2	Queen of the South	Cheaper Insurance Direct Stadium
19:45	Nade 4', 50'; Walsh 48'; Fleming 86' (pen.)	QOSFC Report	Russell 28'; Harris 43'	Attendance: 573; Referee: Finnie

16 April 2016 ScoChamp Match 34	Alloa Athletic	2 – 2	Queen of the South	Indodrill Stadium
15:00	Flannigan 37' (pen.); McManus 76'	QOSFC Report	Lyle 67' (pen.); Hilson 85'	Attendance: 512; Referee: Duncan

23 April 2016 ScoChamp Match 35	Queen of the South	3 – 1	Livingston	Palmerston Park
15:00	Lyle 60' (pen.), 69'; Oliver 79'; Kidd (yellow card) 83' (red card) 84'	QOSFC Report	Stanton 29'	Attendance: 1,421; Referee: Northcroft

1 May 2016 ScoChamp Match 36	Hibernian	2 – 0	Queen of the South	Easter Road
12:30	Gunnarsson 67'; Cummings 79'	QOSFC Report	Millar (red card) 55'	Attendance: 9,900; Referee: Salmond

=== Scottish Challenge Cup ===
25 July 2015 Round 1	Queen of the South	2 – 0	Stranraer	Palmerston Park
15:00	Lyle 20'; Conroy 90'	QOSFC Report		Attendance: 1,229; Referee: Madden

18 August 2015 Round 2	Queen of the South	0 – 1 (a.e.t.)	Livingston	Palmerston Park
19:45		QOSFC Report	White 115'	Attendance: 1,189; Referee: Graham

=== Scottish League Cup ===
1 August 2015 Round 1	Annan Athletic	3 – 4 (a.e.t.)	Queen of the South	Galabank
15:00	Osadolor 59'; Weatherson 63', 72'; Black (yellow card) 88' (yellow-red card) 93'; Omar (red card) 118'	QOSFC Report	Conroy 42'; Lyle 65', 100'; Hilson 90'	Attendance: 1,359; Referee: Graham

25 August 2015 Round 2	Queen of the South	0 – 1	Greenock Morton	Palmerston Park
19:45		QOSFC Report	Forbes 69'	Attendance: 1,034; Referee: Dallas

=== Scottish Cup ===
9 January 2016 Round 4	Dumbarton	2 – 1	Queen of the South	Cheaper Insurance Direct Stadium
15:00	Fleming 17', 57'	QOSFC Report	Lyle 52'	Attendance: 680; Referee: Salmond

== Player statistics ==
=== Captains ===
No.	P	Name	Country	No. games	Notes
6	DF	Chris Higgins	(Scotland)	37	Club Captain
4	DF	Andy Dowie	(Scotland)	4	Vice Captain

Last updated: 2 May 2016
Source: Competitive match reports.
Competitive matches only
Matches started as captain only
Country: FIFA nationality; No.: Squad number; P: Position; Name: Player name; No. Games: Number of games started as captain.

=== Squad ===
Last updated 14 May 2016

No.	Pos	Nat	Player	Total		Scottish Championship		Challenge Cup		League Cup		Scottish Cup	
No.	Pos	Nat	Player	Apps	Goals	Apps	Goals	Apps	Goals	Apps	Goals	Apps	Goals
1	GK	(Scotland) SCO	Robbie Thomson	35	0	30+0	0	2+0	0	2+0	0	1+0	0
2	DF	(Scotland) SCO	Lewis Kidd	32	1	21+6	1	2+0	0	2+0	0	1+0	0
3	DF	(Scotland) SCO	Richard Murray	0	0	0+0	0	0+0	0	0+0	0	0+0	0
4	DF	(Scotland) SCO	Andy Dowie	33	0	29+0	0	1+0	0	2+0	0	1+0	0
5	DF	(Scotland) SCO	Darren Brownlie	32	1	25+4	1	1+0	0	1+0	0	0+1	0
6	DF	(Scotland) SCO	Chris Higgins	38	1	32+1	1	2+0	0	2+0	0	1+0	0
7	MF	(Scotland) SCO	Alex Harris	27	4	20+6	4	0+0	0	0+0	0	0+1	0
8	MF	(Scotland) SCO	Mark Millar	32	1	19+8	1	2+0	0	2+0	0	1+0	0
9	FW	(Scotland) SCO	Derek Lyle	37	17	29+3	13	1+1	1	2+0	2	1+0	1
10	MF	(Scotland) SCO	Ryan Conroy	32	2	20+8	0	2+0	1	2+0	1	0+0	0
11	FW	(Scotland) SCO	Iain Russell	35	11	22+9	11	1+0	0	2+0	0	1+0	0
12	DF	(Scotland) SCO	Shaun Rutherford	1	0	0+1	0	0+0	0	0+0	0	0+0	0
14	MF	(South Africa) RSA	Kyle Jacobs	30	0	23+3	0	2+0	0	1+0	0	1+0	0
15	MF	(Scotland) SCO	Callum Tapping	13	0	11+2	0	0+0	0	0+0	0	0+0	0
16	MF	(Scotland) SCO	Kyle Hutton	33	0	24+6	0	1+0	0	1+0	0	1+0	0
17	MF	(England) ENG	Jake Pickard	24	0	12+8	0	1+1	0	0+1	0	0+1	0
*18	FW	(Ireland) EIR	Paul Heffernan	7	1	3+2	1	1+0	0	0+1	0	0+0	0
18	MF	(Scotland) SCO	Andy Murdoch	10	1	7+3	1	0+0	0	0+0	0	0+0	0
19	MF	(England) ENG	Owen Moxon	2	0	0+1	0	0+0	0	0+1	0	0+0	0
20	GK	(England) ENG	James Atkinson	7	0	6+1	0	0+0	0	0+0	0	0+0	0
21	FW	(Scotland) SCO	Dale Hilson	17	5	11+3	4	2+0	0	1+0	1	0+0	0
22	DF	(Scotland) SCO	Scott Hooper	8	0	5+1	0	0+1	0	0+1	0	0+0	0
23	DF	(England) ENG	Jordan Marshall	34	0	29+0	0	1+1	0	2+0	0	1+0	0
24	FW	(Scotland) SCO	Aidan Smith	20	1	3+13	1	0+2	0	0+2	0	0+0	0
25	DF	(England) ENG	Jack Dickinson	0	0	0+0	0	0+0	0	0+0	0	0+0	0
26	DF	(Scotland) SCO	James Fowler	0	0	0+0	0	0+0	0	0+0	0	0+0	0
27	FW	(Scotland) SCO	Steven Higgins	0	0	0+0	0	0+0	0	0+0	0	0+0	0
28	FW	(Scotland) SCO	Gary Oliver	29	6	15+13	6	0+0	0	0+0	0	1+0	0
29	FW	(England) ENG	Gavin Skelton	0	0	0+0	0	0+0	0	0+0	0	0+0	0
33	FW	(Scotland) SCO	Liam Coogans	3	0	0+3	0	0+0	0	0+0	0	0+0	0
35	FW	(Scotland) SCO	Dean Brotherston	0	0	0+0	0	0+0	0	0+0	0	0+0	0
36	DF	(England) ENG	Jack Brannan	0	0	0+0	0	0+0	0	0+0	0	0+0	0

=== Disciplinary record ===
As of 2 May 2016 (UTC)

Number	Nation	Position	Name	Scottish Championship		Challenge Cup		League Cup		Scottish Cup		Total	
Number	Nation	Position	Name	Yellow card	Red card	Yellow card	Red card	Yellow card	Red card	Yellow card	Red card	Yellow card	Red card
1	(Scotland)	GK	Robbie Thomson	3	0	0	0	0	0	0	0	3	0
2	(Scotland)	DF	Lewis Kidd	8	1	0	0	0	0	0	0	8	1
4	(Scotland)	DF	Andy Dowie	8	0	0	0	0	0	0	0	8	0
5	(Scotland)	DF	Darren Brownlie	3	0	0	0	0	0	0	0	3	0
6	(Scotland)	DF	Chris Higgins	8	0	0	0	0	0	0	0	8	0
8	(Scotland)	MF	Mark Millar	7	1	1	0	0	0	0	0	8	1
9	(Scotland)	FW	Derek Lyle	4	1	0	0	1	0	0	0	5	1
11	(Scotland)	FW	Iain Russell	3	0	1	0	1	0	0	0	5	0
14	(South Africa)	MF	Kyle Jacobs	9	0	0	0	0	0	0	0	9	0
15	(Scotland)	MF	Callum Tapping	5	0	0	0	0	0	0	0	5	0
16	(Scotland)	MF	Kyle Hutton	5	0	1	0	0	0	0	0	6	0
17	(England)	MF	Jake Pickard	4	0	0	0	0	0	0	0	4	0
18	(Scotland)	MF	Andy Murdoch	2	0	0	0	0	0	0	0	2	0
21	(Scotland)	FW	Dale Hilson	2	0	0	0	1	0	0	0	3	0
22	(Scotland)	DF	Scott Hooper	1	0	0	0	0	0	0	0	1	0
23	(England)	DF	Jordan Marshall	1	0	1	0	0	0	0	0	2	0
Totals				73	3	4	0	3	0	0	0	80	3

=== Top Scorers ===
Last updated on 2 May 2016

Position	Nation	Name	Scottish Championship	Challenge Cup	League Cup	Scottish Cup	Total
1	(Scotland)	Derek Lyle	13	1	2	1	17
2	(Scotland)	Iain Russell	11	0	0	0	11
3	(Scotland)	Gary Oliver	6	0	0	0	6
4	(Scotland)	Dale Hilson	4	0	1	0	5
5	(Scotland)	Alex Harris	4	0	0	0	4
6	(Scotland)	Ryan Conroy	0	1	1	0	2
7	(Scotland)	Lewis Kidd	1	0	0	0	1
=	(Scotland)	Aidan Smith	1	0	0	0	1
=	(Scotland)	Chris Higgins	1	0	0	0	1
=	(Scotland)	Andy Murdoch	1	0	0	0	1
=	(Scotland)	Darren Brownlie	1	0	0	0	1
=	(Scotland)	Mark Millar	1	0	0	0	1
=	(Republic of Ireland)	Paul Heffernan	1	0	0	0	1

=== Clean sheets ===
No.	Pos	Nat	Name	Scottish Championship	Challenge Cup	League Cup	Scottish Cup	Total
1	GK	(Scotland)	Robbie Thomson	9	1	0	0	10
20	GK	(England)	James Atkinson	1	0	0	0	1
			Totals	10	1	0	0	11

Last updated: 2 May 2016
Source: Match reports in Competitive matches

== Team statistics ==
=== League table ===
Pos	Team	Pld	W	D	L	GF	GA	GD	Pts	Promotion, qualification or relegation
5	Greenock Morton	36	11	10	15	39	42	−3	43	
6	St Mirren	36	11	9	16	44	53	−9	42	
7	Queen of the South	36	12	6	18	46	56	−10	42	
8	Dumbarton	36	10	7	19	35	66	−31	37	
9	Livingston (R)	36	8	7	21	37	51	−14	31	Qualification for the Championship play-offs

Source: Soccerway
Rules for classification: 1) Points; 2) Goal difference; 3) Number of goals scored
(R) Relegated

=== Division summary ===
Round	1	2	3	4	5	6	7	8	9	10	11	12	13	14	15	16	17	18	19	20	21	22	23	24	25	26	27	28	29	30	31	32	33	34	35	36
Ground	H	A	A	H	H	A	H	A	H	H	A	H	A	H	A	H	H	A	A	H	A	H	H	A	H	A	A	A	H	A	H	H	A	A	H	A
Result	W	W	W	L	L	L	D	D	L	W	L	L	W	W	L	D	D	L	W	W	L	W	L	L	W	L	L	L	W	L	D	L	L	D	W	L
Position	2	2	2	3	3	6	6	5	5	5	5	5	5	5	6	6	6	6	5	5	5	4	5	6	5	5	5	6	6	6	6	6	6	7	6	7

Updated to match(es) played on 2 May 2016. Source:
A = Away; H = Home; W = Win; D = Draw; L = Loss

=== Management statistics ===
Last updated on 2 May 2016

Name	From	To	P	W	D	L	Win% (Note: Win% is the percentage of matches won rounded to two decimal places.)
James Fowler	25 July 2015	16 April 2016	39	13	6	20	33.33
Gavin Skelton	22 April 2016	1 May 2016	2	1	0	1	50.00

== Transfers ==
=== Players in ===
Player	From	Fee
(Scotland) Robbie Thomson	(Scotland) Cowdenbeath	Free
(Scotland) Ryan Conroy	(Scotland) Raith Rovers	Free
(Scotland) Darren Brownlie	(Scotland) Cowdenbeath	Free
(Scotland) Steven Higgins	(Scotland) Motherwell	Free
(Scotland) Shaun Rutherford	(Scotland) Livingston	Free
(Scotland) Dale Hilson	(Scotland) Forfar Athletic	Free
(South Africa) Kyle Jacobs	(Scotland) Livingston	Free
(England) Jordan Marshall	(England) Carlisle United	Free
(Scotland) Callum Tapping	(Scotland) Brechin City	Free
(Republic of Ireland) Paul Heffernan	(Scotland) Dundee	Free
(Scotland) Kyle Hutton	(Scotland) Rangers	Free
(Scotland) Alex Harris	(Scotland) Hibernian	Loan
(Scotland) Gary Oliver	(Scotland) Heart of Midlothian	Undisclosed
(Scotland) Liam Coogans	(England) Huddersfield Town	Loan
(Scotland) Andy Murdoch	(Scotland) Rangers	Loan

=== Players out ===
Player	To	Fee
(Scotland) Chris Mitchell	(Scotland) Clyde	Free
(Scotland) Kevin Holt	(Scotland) Dundee	Undisclosed
(Scotland) Ian McShane	(Scotland) Ross County	Undisclosed
(United States) Kevin Dzierzawski	(Scotland) Peterhead	Free
(Scotland) Dan Carmichael	(Scotland) Hibernian	Free
(Scotland) Mark Durnan	(Scotland) Dundee United	Undisclosed
(Scotland) Gavin Reilly	(Scotland) Heart of Midlothian	Undisclosed
(Scotland) Michael Paton	(Scotland) Dunfermline Athletic	Free
(Scotland) Patrick Slattery	(Scotland) East Fife	Free
(Scotland) Dean Smith	(Scotland) Gretna 2008	Free
(Algeria) Salim Kouider Aissa	(Scotland) Stirling Albion	Free
(Scotland) Stephen McKenna		Free
(Scotland) Paul Burns	(Scotland) Cumnock Juniors	Released
(Scotland) Steven Higgins		Free
(Scotland) Liam Coogans	(England) Huddersfield Town	Released
(Scotland) Shaun Rutherford	(Scotland) Arbroath	Loan
(Republic of Ireland) Paul Heffernan	(Scotland) Dumbarton	Released
(Scotland) Scott Hooper	(Scotland) Queen's Park	Loan

== See also ==
- List of Queen of the South F.C. seasons
