= Robbie Thomson =

Scottish footballer (born 1993)

Personal information
- Full name: Robert Scott Thomson
- Date of birth: 7 March 1993 (age 33)
- Place of birth: Falkirk, Scotland
- Height: 1.92 m (6 ft 4 in)
- Position: Goalkeeper

Team information
- Current team: Falkirk (goalkeeper coach)

Youth career
- 2003–2012: Celtic

Senior career*
Years	Team	Apps	(Gls)
2012–2013	Celtic	0	(0)
2012	→ Stenhousemuir (loan)	7	(0)
2013	→ Airdrie United (loan)	11	(0)
2013–2014	Rochdale	1	(0)
2014–2015	Cowdenbeath	32	(0)
2015–2016	Queen of the South	30	(0)
2016–2017	Hamilton Academical	1	(0)
2017–2018	Falkirk	27	(0)
2018–2024	Raith Rovers	35	(0)

International career
2008	Scotland U15	1	(0)
2008	Scotland U16	5	(0)
2008–2010	Scotland U17	9	(0)
2011	Scotland U19	1	(0)
- * Club domestic league appearances and goals

Robert Scott Thomson (born 7 March 1993) is a Scottish football coach and a former goalkeeper who is the current goalkeeping coach of Falkirk. He has played for Celtic, Stenhousemuir, Airdrie United, Rochdale, Cowdenbeath, Queen of the South, Hamilton Academical, Falkirk and Raith Rovers.

== Career ==
Thomson was born in Falkirk; he began his career at Celtic, joining the Glasgow giants at eight years old. In January 2012 Thomson signed a new two-year contract with the club, and was registered in the squad for the 2012-2013 UEFA Champions League campaign. However, Thomson only had two substitute appearances for the club. During his time at Celtic he spent time out on loan, firstly at Stenhousemuir in September 2012, where he made his debut against Inverness Caledonian Thistle in the League Cup, then in February 2013 at Airdrie United. His time at Airdrie United came to an end after he suffered a hand injury during a match against Dumbarton on 20 April 2013.

After being released by Celtic, Thomson went on trial at Carlisle United and Oldham Athletic. Thomson signed for Rochdale on 26 July 2013, after impressing on trial. After signing, Thomson said he believed joining Rochdale "was the best move" for progressing his career. Thomson was second choice goalkeeper behind Josh Lillis for the majority of the season until he made his debut for the club against Mansfield Town on 26 December 2013, as Lillis was absent due to illness. Thomson had a shut-out as Rochdale recorded a 3–0 victory. Rochdale gained promotion to League One at the end of the 2013–14 season. Thomson also departed the club at the end of the 2013–14 season due to a lack of first team opportunities.

On 18 July 2014, Thomson signed for Cowdenbeath. Thomson made his Blue Brazil debut in a 3–2 defeat against Hibernian on 13 September 2014, where his father had previously been the goalkeeping coach. He remained the first choice goalkeeper for the club throughout the season and although the club were subsequently relegated at the end of the season, Thomson was a stand out performer and earned club supporters awards for 'Player of the Season' and also ' Young Player of the Season'.

Thomson signed for Queen of the South on 28 May 2015, on a two-year contract. On 31 August 2016, Thomson was released by the Dumfries club by mutual consent, after Lee Robinson's return to Queens as first choice goalkeeper.

On 2 September 2016, Thomson signed for Hamilton Academical, after the club had a dilemma, with their other three goalkeepers all out injured. He left the club on 3 January 2017 and then signed for Falkirk. Thomson was released by Falkirk after the 2017–18 season.

Thomson signed a two-year contract with Raith Rovers in June 2018.

After retirement, Thomson was a coach at Raith Rovers before returning to Falkirk as Head of Goalkeeping in August 2025.

=== International career ===
Thomson has played for Scotland at various levels, including under–15, under-16, under-17, under-19 and under-21.

== Personal life ==
Robbie attended Bantaskin Primary School and Falkirk High School. He is the son of former goalkeeper Scott Thomson who played mainly for Raith Rovers, as well as Forfar Athletic and some other clubs.

== Career statistics ==
As of match played 4 November 2017

Appearances and goals by club, season and competition
Club	Season	League			National Cup		League Cup		Other		Total	
Club	Season	Division	Apps	Goals	Apps	Goals	Apps	Goals	Apps	Goals	Apps	Goals
Stenhousemuir (loan)	2012–13	Second Division	7	0	0	0	1	0	0	0	8	0
Airdrie United (loan)	2012–13	First Division	11	0	0	0	—		0	0	11	0
Rochdale	2013–14	EFL League Two	1	0	0	0	0	0	0	0	1	0
Cowdenbeath	2014–15	Championship	32	0	2	0	0	0	1 (Note: Appearances in the Scottish Challenge Cup)	0	35	0
Queen of the South	2015–16	Championship	30	0	1	0	2	0	2	0	35	0
Hamilton Academical	2016–17	Premiership	1	0	0	0	0	0	—		1	0
Falkirk	2016–17	Championship	7	0	0	0	0	0	2 (Note: Appearances in the Premiership play-offs)	0	9	0
Falkirk	2017–18	Championship	11	0	0	0	4	0	2	0	17	0
Falkirk	Falkirk total		18	0	0	0	4	0	4	0	26	0
Career total			100	0	3	0	7	0	7	0	117	0

== Honours ==
Raith Rovers

- Scottish League One : 2019-20
- Scottish Challenge Cup : 2021-22
