= Kleton Perntreou =

Albanian-Greek footballer

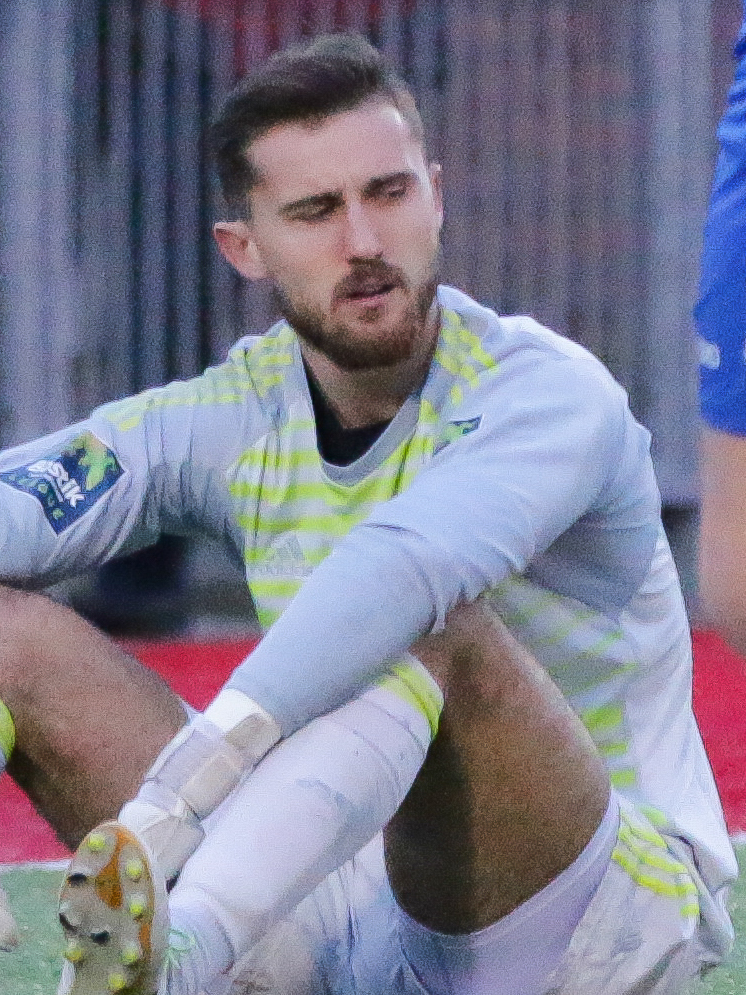
- Perntreou with Worthing in January 2019

Personal information
- Date of birth: 8 January 1995 (age 31)
- Place of birth: Tirana, Albania
- Height: 6 ft 3 in (1.91 m)
- Position: Goalkeeper

Team information
- Current team: Akritas Chlorakas
- Number: 1

Youth career
- 2012–2013: Bristol City

Senior career*
Years	Team	Apps	(Gls)
2013–2015	Hibernian	2	(0)
2015–2017	Crystal Palace	0	(0)
2017–2018	Welling United	2	(0)
2018	Chelmsford City	0	(0)
2018–2019	Worthing	34	(0)
2019	Chatham Town	3	(0)
2019	Margate	6	(0)
2019–2020	Carshalton Athletic	38	(0)
2020–2023	Akritas Chlorakas	91	(0)
2023–2024	Makedonikos	20	(0)
2024–2025	Larissa	13	(0)
2025–	Akritas Chlorakas	33	(0)
- * Club domestic league appearances and goals as of 14 June 2026

Kleton Perntreou (Greek: Κλέιτον Περντρέου; Albanian: Kleton Përndreu; born 8 January 1995) is an Albanian professional football who plays as a goalkeeper for Cypriot First Division club Akritas Chlorakas.

== Career ==
Born in Tirana, Perntreou, who is of Greek descent, moved to Athens aged five.

In 2012, he moved to England and had a successful trial with Bristol City, where he joined the under-18 team. The following year he was offered a professional contract by the Robins, but rejected the offer and instead joined Hibernian. He spent the 2013–14 season in the under-20 team and made his senior debut in the Scottish Championship the following season, coming on as a half-time substitute for Mark Oxley against Cowdenbeath on 8 November 2014. He started the following game against Queen of the South, but made no further appearances for Hibs and was released at the end of the 2014–15 season. In July 2015, he signed for Crystal Palace. Perntreou was released by Crystal Palace on 1 September 2017, without having made a senior appearance for the club. Perntreou joined Welling United in October 2017.

On 21 March 2018, Perntreou signed for Chelmsford City. In October 2018, Perntreou joined Worthing. Later that season he played for Chatham Town and Margate. Perntreou joined Carshalton Athletic in August 2019. For the 2020–21 season he joined Cypriot Second Division club Akritas Chlorakas.

== Career statistics ==
As of match played 23 September 2020

Appearances and goals by club, season and competition
Club	Season	League			National Cup		League Cup		Other		Total	
Club	Season	Division	Apps	Goals	Apps	Goals	Apps	Goals	Apps	Goals	Apps	Goals
Hibernian	2014–15	Scottish Championship	2	0	0	0	0	0	0	0	2	0
Crystal Palace	2015–16	Premier League	0	0	0	0	0	0	—		0	0
Crystal Palace	2016–17	Premier League	0	0	0	0	0	0	—		0	0
Welling United	2017–18	National League South	2	0	0	0	—		0	0	2	0
Chelmsford City	2017–18	National League South	0	0	0	0	—		0	0	0	0
Worthing	2018–19	Isthmian League Premier Division	21	0	0	0	—		7	0	28	0
Chatham Town	2018–19	SCEL Premier Division	3	0	0	0	—		0	0	3	0
Margate	2018–19	Isthmian League Premier Division	6	0	0	0	—		0	0	6	0
Carshalton Athletic	2019–20	Isthmian League Premier Division	29	0	5	0	—		5	0	39	0
Akritas Chlorakas	2020–21	Cypriot Second Division	0	0	1	0	—		0	0	1	0
Career total			63	0	6	0	0	0	12	0	81	0
