= Scott Hooper =

Scottish footballer

Personal information
- Date of birth: 14 January 1995 (age 31)
- Place of birth: Dumfries, Scotland
- Position: Defender

Team information
- Current team: Annan Athletic
- Number: 2

Youth career
- Queen of the South

Senior career*
Years	Team	Apps	(Gls)
2014–2017	Queen of the South	22	(0)
2016	→ Queen's Park (loan)	6	(0)
2017–2019	Annan Athletic	48	(1)
2019–2020	Peterhead	19	(0)
2020–2022	Kelty Hearts	16	(1)
2022	→ Annan Athletic (loan)	8	(0)
2022–	Annan Athletic	93	(0)
- * Club domestic league appearances and goals as of 5 May 2026

Scott Hooper (born 14 January 1995) is a Scottish footballer who plays as a defender for Scottish League Two club Annan Athletic.

Hooper has previously played for Queen of the South, Annan Athletic, Peterhead and Kelty Hearts, and also spent some time on loan at Queen's Park.

== Career ==
Born in Dumfries, Hooper began his career with local club Queen of the South. He was included in the first team squad on 9 November 2013, as an unused substitute in a 1–0 home defeat against Hamilton Academical in the Scottish Championship. Hooper played on 3 May 2014 in the final league match of the campaign in a 1–1 draw against Cowdenbeath, playing the full 90 minutes.

In February 2016, Hooper signed on loan for Scottish League Two club Queen's Park who gained promotion that season on an emergency loan deal for a month. Hooper's contract at Queens wasn't renewed, and he was subsequently released in May 2017 after four seasons at Palmerston. Hooper remained in Dumfries and Galloway after signing for Scottish League Two club Annan Athletic on 14 June 2017.

Hooper signed with Peterhead in 2019 before moving to Kelty Hearts on 31 July 2020. On 1 March 2022, Hooper returned to former club Annan Athletic on loan for the remainder of the 2021–22 season. He then returned to Annan permanently during the 2022 close season.

== Career statistics ==
As of match played 21 October 2017

Appearances and goals by club, season and competition
Club	Season	League			Scottish Cup		League Cup		Other		Total	
Club	Season	Division	Apps	Goals	Apps	Goals	Apps	Goals	Apps	Goals	Apps	Goals
Queen of the South	2013–14	Championship	1	0	0	0	0	0	0	0	1	0
Queen of the South	2014–15	Championship	7	0	0	0	0	0	0	0	7	0
Queen of the South	2015–16	Championship	6	0	0	0	1	0	1 (Note: Appearances in the Scottish Challenge Cup)	0	8	0
Queen of the South	2016–17	Championship	1	0	0	0	1	0	0	0	2	0
Queen of the South	Total		15	0	0	0	2	0	1	0	18	0
Queen's Park (loan)	2015–16	League Two	6	0	0	0	0	0	0	0	6	0
Annan Athletic	2017–18	League Two	81	0	0	0	3	0	2	0	14	0
Career total			30	0	0	0	5	0	3	0	38	0

105
