= James Atkinson (footballer) =

English footballer

Personal information
- Date of birth: 6 January 1995 (age 31)
- Place of birth: Carlisle, England
- Position: Goalkeeper

Team information
- Current team: Gretna 2008

Senior career*
Years	Team	Apps	(Gls)
2013–2017	Queen of the South	17	(0)
2017–2018	Annan Athletic	14	(0)
2018–2019	Gretna 2008	8	(0)
2019–2024	Workington AFC		
- * Club domestic league appearances and goals as of 16:00, 14 June 2019 (UTC)

James Atkinson (born 6 January 1995) is an English professional footballer who plays as a goalkeeper for Workington AFC.

Atkinson has previously played for Queen of the South, Annan Athletic and Gretna 2008.

== Career ==
Born in Carlisle, Cumbria, Atkinson started his career at Queen of the South. Atkinson was first included in a match-day squad on 23 July 2011, remaining an unused substitute as the team lost 2–0 after extra time at Somerset Park versus Ayr United in the first round of the Scottish Challenge Cup. Atkinson was also an unused substitute in 18 Division One matches that season, a campaign which ended in relegation to Division Two.

Atkinson was also on the substitute's bench when Queens won the 2013 Scottish Challenge Cup Final against Partick Thistle on 7 April 2013. Atkinson made his debut on 4 May 2013, replacing Lee Robinson for the final seven minutes of the 1–0 win at Cliftonhill, Coatbridge versus Albion Rovers. This win enabled the title winners, Queen of the South a record Second Division total of 92 points, in the final ever season that the Second Division was contested. The new league structure then changed the name of the third tier of Scottish football to Scottish League One for the start of the 2013-14 season.

On 29 January 2014, Atkinson played his first professional game, a 1–1 Scottish Championship draw at Cappielow versus Greenock Morton, replacing the injured Zander Clark after 24 minutes, due to Clark obtaining an injury midway through the first half. In Clark's absence, Atkinson started his first game three days later, in a 2–1 win over Livingston. Two weeks later, Atkinson was given a straight red card in a match versus Dundee at Palmerston for conceding a penalty after fouling Martin Boyle that Ryan Conroy converted past the replacement Queens goalkeeper, Calum Antell for the only goal of the match.

Atkinson's contract wasn't renewed during May 2017, so was released after having played only 17 league matches in four seasons with the Dumfries club. After leaving near neighbours Queens, Atkinson signed for Annan Athletic on 7 July 2017 after a successful trial.

During the 2018 close season, Atkinson was released by the Black and Golds after playing in 14 league matches and 4 league cup games and then signed for Gretna 2008 in the Lowland League.

Atkinson signed for Workington AFC in 2019.

== Career statistics ==
As of match played 22 September 2018

Appearances and goals by club, season and competition
Club	Season	League			Scottish Cup		League Cup		Other		Total	
Club	Season	Division	Apps	Goals	Apps	Goals	Apps	Goals	Apps	Goals	Apps	Goals
Queen of the South	2012–13	Second Division	1	0	0	0	0	0	0	0	1	0
Queen of the South	2013–14	Championship	4	0	0	0	0	0	0	0	4	0
Queen of the South	2014–15	Championship	4	0	2	0	0	0	0	0	6	0
Queen of the South	2015–16	Championship	7	0	0	0	0	0	0	0	7	0
Queen of the South	2016–17	Championship	1	0	0	0	0	0	0	0	1	0
Queen of the South	Total		17	0	2	0	0	0	0	0	19	0
Annan Athletic	2017–18	League Two	14	0	0	0	4	0	0	0	18	0
Gretna 2008	2018-19	Lowland League	8	0	0	0	0	0	0	0	0	0
Career total			39	0	2	0	4	0	0	0	45	0

== Honours ==
Queen of the South

- Scottish Challenge Cup: 2012–13
