= Dean Horribine =

Scottish footballer

Personal information
- Date of birth: 14 January 1993 (age 33)
- Place of birth: Edinburgh, Scotland
- Position: Midfielder

Team information
- Current team: St Bernard's

Youth career
- 2002–2013: Hibernian

Senior career*
Years	Team	Apps	(Gls)
2013–2014	Hibernian	2	(0)
2014–2015	Berwick Rangers	2	(0)
2015–?	Spartans		
- * Club domestic league appearances and goals as of 21:50, 13 April 2015 (UTC)

Dean Horribine (born 14 January 1993) is a Scottish footballer who plays as a midfielder for Spartans. He has previously played for Hibernian and Berwick Rangers. He now plays for top Edinburgh amateur side, St Bernard's AFC.

== Career ==
Horribine joined the Hibernian (Hibs) youth system in 2002. After agreeing a one-year contract with Hibs in May 2012, he played regularly for their under-20 side during the 2012–13 season. Horribine made his debut appearance for Hibs in a 3–1 win against Kilmarnock on 15 May 2013. Horribine was released from his contract with Hibs at the end of the 2013–14 season.

Horribine then signed for Berwick Rangers, having already played for the club as a trialist in a Scottish Challenge Cup tie. He was released from his contract by mutual consent on 10 February 2015.

Following his release from Berwick, Horribine signed for Lowland Football League club Spartans.

== Career statistics ==
As of 13 April 2015

Club	Season	League		Cup		League Cup		Other		Total	
Club	Season	App	Goals	App	Goals	App	Goals	App	Goals	App	Goals
Hibernian	2012–13	1	0	0	0	0	0	0	0	1	0
Hibernian	2013–14	1	0	0	0	0	0	0	0	1	0
Hibernian	Total	2	0	0	0	0	0	0	0	2	0
Berwick Rangers	2014–15	2	0	0	0	0	0	1	0	3	0
Career total		4	0	0	0	0	0	1	0	5	0
