= Lewis Kidd (footballer) =

Scottish footballer

Personal information
- Date of birth: 30 January 1995 (age 31)
- Place of birth: Bellshill, Scotland
- Positions: Full back; midfielder

Team information
- Current team: Albion Rovers

Youth career
- Celtic

Senior career*
Years	Team	Apps	(Gls)
2013–2014	Celtic	0	(0)
2014	→ Queen of the South (loan)	4	(0)
2014–2016	Queen of the South	62	(2)
2016–2019	Falkirk	46	(2)
2019–2020	Queen of the South	20	(0)
2020–2021	East Kilbride		
2021	→ Albion Rovers (loan)	8	(0)
2021–2022	Edinburgh City	7	(0)
2022–	Albion Rovers	0	(0)

International career
2010–2012	Scotland U17	22	(3)
2010–2011	Scotland U16	5	(2)
2012	Scotland U20	5	(0)
2013–2014	Scotland U19	2	(0)
2013	Scotland U18	2	(0)
- * Club domestic league appearances and goals as of 13:21, 10 July 2022 (UTC)

Lewis Kidd (born 30 January 1995) is a Scottish professional footballer who plays for Albion Rovers as a full back or midfielder.

Kidd has previously played for Celtic, Falkirk, two spells with Queen of the South, East Kilbride and Edinburgh City.

Kidd has also represented Scotland at various youth levels.

== Career ==
In February 2014, Kidd had a loan spell at Queen of the South from Celtic. In June 2014, after being released by Celtic, Kidd signed a permanent deal for the Dumfries club. Kidd scored two league goals and one cup goal in 75 competitive first-team matches for the Doonhamers, including a goal versus Rangers that was initially reported in the media as a Lee Wallace own goal. Kidd departed Queens at the end of the 2015–16 season.

On 15 June 2016, Kidd signed for Scottish Championship club Falkirk. On 19 May 2018, he signed a contract extension to remain with the Bairns until the end of the 2018–19 season. Falkirk were relegated to Scottish League One after the final league match of the season, despite defeating league champions Ross County 3–2 at the Falkirk Stadium and Kidd was then released by the Bairns.

On 25 June 2019, Kidd signed for Queen of the South for a second spell with the club.

On 9 July 2020, Kidd was announced as a new signing for East Kilbride. He was loaned to Albion Rovers in March 2021.

Edinburgh City announced the signing of Kidd on 4 June 2021.

== Career statistics ==
As of 25 August 2020

Appearances and goals by, club, season and competition
Club	Season	League			Scottish Cup		League Cup		Other		Total	
Club	Season	Division	Apps	Goals	Apps	Goals	Apps	Goals	Apps	Goals	Apps	Goals
Celtic	2013–14	Scottish Premiership	0	0	0	0	0	0	0	0	0	0
Queen of the South (loan)	2013–14	Scottish Championship	4	0	0	0	0	0	2 (Note: Appearances in the Premiership play-offs)	0	6	0
Queen of the South	2014–15	Scottish Championship	35	1	3	1	2	0	3 (Note: One appearance in the Scottish Challenge Cup and two in the Premiership play-offs)	0	43	2
Queen of the South	2015–16	Scottish Championship	27	1	1	0	2	0	2 (Note: Appearances in the Scottish Challenge Cup)	0	32	1
Queen of the South	Total		62	2	4	1	4	0	5	0	75	3
Falkirk	2016–17	Scottish Championship	14	1	0	0	2	0	2	0	18	1
Falkirk	2017–18	Scottish Championship	16	1	2	0	0	0	0	0	18	1
Falkirk	2018–19	Scottish Championship	16	0	1	0	2	0	1	0	20	0
Falkirk	Total		46	2	3	0	4	0	3	0	56	2
Queen of the South	2019–20	Scottish Championship	20	0	1	0	4	0	0	0	25	0
East Kilbride	2020-21	Lowland League	0	0	0	0	0	0	0	0	0	0
Career total			132	4	8	1	12	0	10	0	162	5
