= Alex Harris (Scottish footballer) =

Scottish footballer (born 1994)

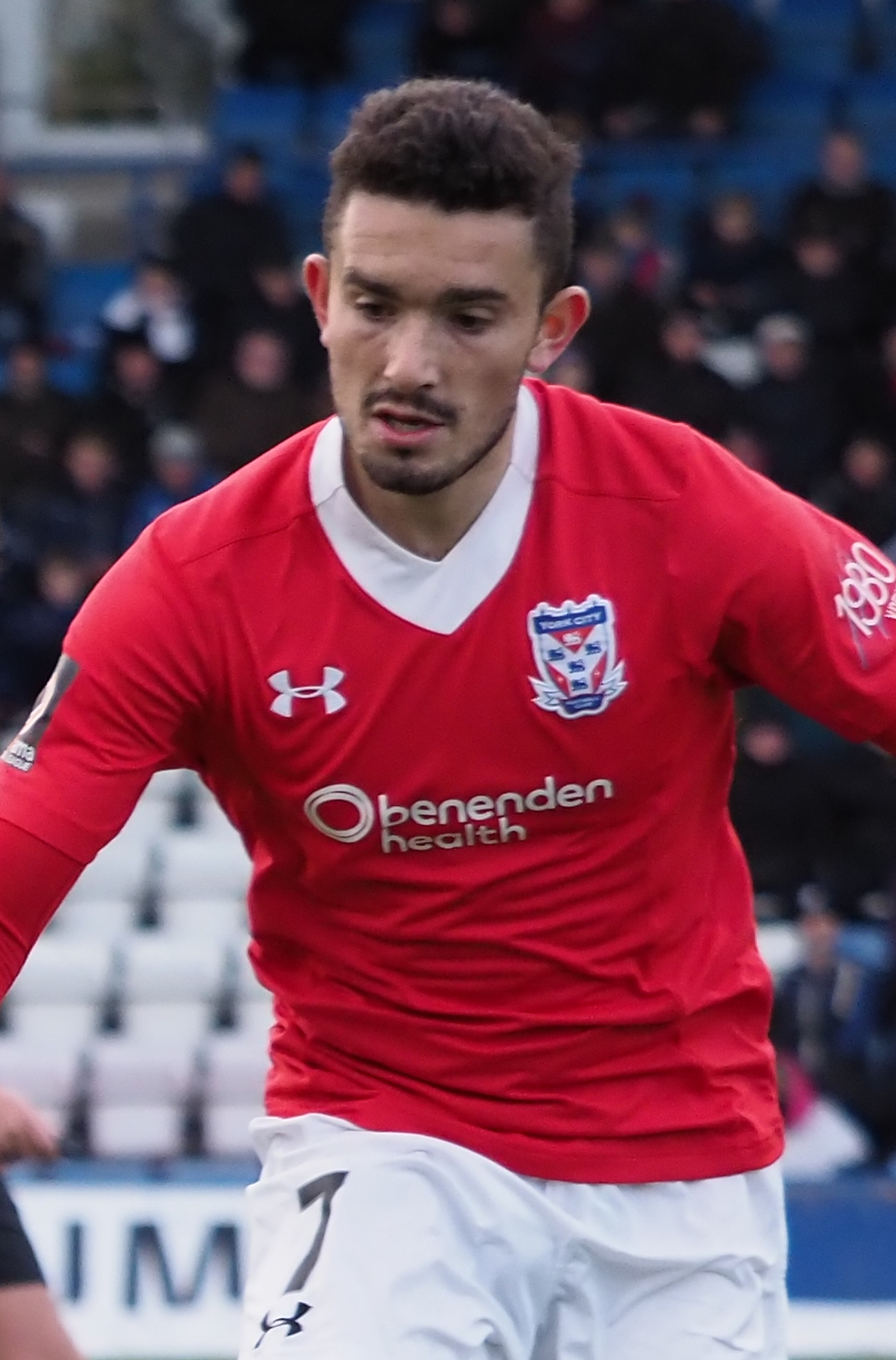
- Harris with York City in 2018

Personal information
- Full name: Alexander David Harris
- Date of birth: 31 August 1994 (age 32)
- Place of birth: Edinburgh, Scotland
- Height: 5 ft 10 in (1.78 m)
- Position: Winger

Team information
- Current team: Berwick Rangers

Youth career
- Civil Service Strollers
- –2012: Hibernian

Senior career*
Years	Team	Apps	(Gls)
2012–2017	Hibernian	43	(2)
2015	→ Dundee (loan)	16	(1)
2015–2016	→ Queen of the South (loan)	26	(4)
2017–2018	Falkirk	21	(1)
2018–2019	York City	22	(1)
2019–2021	Edinburgh City	28	(5)
2021–	Berwick Rangers		

International career
2012	Scotland U19	2	(0)
- * Club domestic league appearances and goals as of 15:00, 24 August 2021 (UTC)

Alexander David Harris (born 31 August 1994) is a Scottish professional footballer who plays as a winger for Berwick Rangers.

He has played in the Scottish Premier League, Scottish Premiership and Scottish Championship for Hibernian, Dundee, Queen of the South and Falkirk, and in the Scottish League Two for Edinburgh City.

== Club career ==
Born in Edinburgh, Harris attended Edinburgh Academy and played for the Civil Service Strollers under-12 team, alongside future Hibernian teammate Danny Handling. He made his first-team debut on 6 October 2012, as an 88th-minute substitute in a 3–0 home win against Dundee. Hibernian came from 3–0 down at half-time to win 4–3 in a 2012–13 Scottish Cup semi-final against Falkirk, as Harris scored the team's first goal and assisted the second.

He missed most of the first half of the 2013–14 season due to an ankle injury. After returning to the Hibernian first team in January 2014, Harris signed a new contract with the club, tying him to the club until June 2017.

Harris moved on loan to Scottish Premiership club Dundee on 3 January 2015, in exchange for Martin Boyle. He scored his first goal for Dundee on 10 January, with a deflected shot in the third minute of a 4–1 home win against Motherwell.

Harris joined Scottish Championship club Queen of the South on 21 August 2015 on loan for the rest of the 2015–16 season. He returned to Hibernian for the 2016–17 season, but was again affected by injury. Harris left the club during the 2017 close season, at the end of his contract. Harris signed a two-year contract with Falkirk on 19 June 2017. He left the club on 31 August 2018 when his contract was cancelled by mutual consent.

Harris signed for National League North club York City on 20 September 2018. He was released at the end of the 2018–19 season.

Harris signed for Scottish League Two club Edinburgh City on 20 June 2019.

Berwick Rangers announced the signing of Harris in the summer of 2021.

== International career ==
Harris was selected for the Scotland national under-19 team in August 2012. He made his debut on 23 August, as a 55th-minute substitute in a 2–1 away defeat to Norway in a friendly. He made his first start two days later in what proved to be his final international appearance, as Scotland again lost away to Norway, this time 3–2.

== Personal life ==
Harris is the great-great-nephew of former Hibernian, Everton and Scotland player Jimmy Dunn.

== Career statistics ==
As of match played 3 February 2021

Appearances and goals by club, season and competition
Club	Season	League			National Cup (Note: Includes Scottish Cup, FA Cup)		League Cup (Note: Includes Scottish League Cup)		Other		Total	
Club	Season	Division	Apps	Goals	Apps	Goals	Apps	Goals	Apps	Goals	Apps	Goals
Hibernian	2012–13	Scottish Premier League	11	0	3	1	0	0	—		14	1
Hibernian	2013–14	Scottish Premiership	15	0	1	0	0	0	4 (Note: Two appearances in UEFA Europa League, two in Scottish Premiership play-offs)	0	20	0
Hibernian	2014–15	Scottish Championship	12	0	1	0	2	0	1 (Note: Appearance(s) in Scottish Challenge Cup)	0	16	0
Hibernian	2015–16	Scottish Championship	0	0	—		1	0	0	0	1	0
Hibernian	2016–17	Scottish Championship	5	0	0	0	1	0	3 (Note: One appearance in UEFA Europa League, two appearances and one goal in Scottish Challenge Cup)	1	9	1
Hibernian	Total		43	0	5	1	4	0	8	1	60	2
Dundee (loan)	2014–15	Scottish Premiership	16	1	—		—		—		16	1
Queen of the South (loan)	2015–16	Scottish Championship	26	4	1	0	—		—		27	4
Falkirk	2017–18	Scottish Championship	21	1	1	0	4	2	3	0	29	3
Falkirk	2018–19	Scottish Championship	0	0	—		0	0	0	0	0	0
Falkirk	Total		21	1	1	0	4	2	3	0	29	3
York City	2018–19	National League North	22	1	4	1	—		2 (Note: Appearances in FA Trophy)	0	28	2
Edinburgh City	2019–20	Scottish League Two	24	5	3	1	4	0	1	0	32	6
Edinburgh City	2020–21	Scottish League Two	4	0	0	0	1	0	0	0	5	0
Edinburgh City	Total		28	5	3	1	5	0	1	0	37	6
Career total			156	12	14	3	13	2	14	1	197	18

== Honours ==
Hibernian

- Scottish Cup runner-up: 2012–13
