= Bradley Donaldson =

Scottish footballer

Personal information
- Date of birth: 2 July 1994 (age 32)
- Place of birth: Edinburgh, Scotland
- Position: Defender

Team information
- Current team: Preston Athletic

Youth career
- Hibernian

Senior career*
Years	Team	Apps	(Gls)
2013–2014	Hibernian	0	(0)
2013–2014	→ Arbroath (loan)	10	(1)
2014–2015	Livingston	3	(0)
2015–2016	Cowdenbeath	23	(2)
2016–2017	Linlithgow Rose		
2017–2018	Musselburgh Athletic		
2018–2019	Edinburgh City	11	(0)
2019–2020	Tranent Juniors		
2020–2021	Musselburgh Athletic		
2021–2022	Tranent Juniors		
2022–2023	Broxburn Athletic		
2023–	Preston Athletic		
- * Club domestic league appearances and goals

Bradley Donaldson (born 2 July 1994) is a Scottish professional footballer who plays as a defender for Preston Athletic.

== Career ==
Donaldson began his career with Hibernian, where he featured on the bench numerous times throughout the 2012–13 season. He spent the first half of the 2013–14 season on loan at Arbroath where he scored his first goal in professional football, in a 2–1 defeat to Airdrieonians on 28 December 2013. In the same game he suffered a bad injury resulting in him missing the rest of the 2013–14 season. Following his loan spell, he left Easter Road.

Following his release, the defender signed for Livingston. His season was again hampered with injuries and left the club at the end of the 2014–15 season after just a few league and cup appearances. He won the 2014–15 challenge cup and survived relegation from the Scottish Championship on the final day of the season.

Donaldson signed for Cowdenbeath in 2015 where he made 23 league appearances for the Central Park side, departing the club in 2016.

He had spells in junior football with Linlithgow Rose and Musselburgh Athletic winning the East of Scotland Premier League before returning to the Scottish Football League with Edinburgh City in 2018.

The defender left the Citizens in 2019 after 11 league appearances and just missing out on promotion to Scottish League One. He returned to junior football. He signed for Tranent Juniors in 2019, had a second spell at Musselburgh Athletic in 2020 before returning to Tranent Juniors in 2021 where he again won the East of Scotland Premier League and gained promotion to the Scottish Lowland League. Donaldson signed for Broxburn Athletic in 2022.

In June 2023, Donaldson signed for Preston Athletic and was appointed club captain.

== Personal life ==
In September 2020, he was caught more than four times over the drink drive limit behind the wheel of his Mercedes. The sheriff banned him from driving for 12 months and imposed a £420 fine.
