= Bobby Nicol =

Scottish footballer

Personal information
- Full name: Robert Benjamin Mathieson Nicol
- Date of birth: 11 May 1936
- Place of birth: Edinburgh, Scotland
- Date of death: 11 July 2012 (aged 76)
- Place of death: Newmarket, Ontario, Canada
- Position: Wing half

Youth career
- Ashton
- –1952: Edinburgh City
- 1952–1955: Hibernian

Senior career*
Years	Team	Apps	(Gls)
1955–1962	Hibernian	37	(2)
1962–1963	Barnsley	37	(1)
1963–1964	Berwick Rangers	15	(0)
1962	Toronto City		
1964	Toronto City		
1966–1967	Toronto Roma		
1968	Toronto Ukrainians		
Total		89	(3)

International career
1956–1958	Scotland U23	2	(0)
- * Club domestic league appearances and goals

Bobby Nicol (11 May 1936 – 11 July 2012) was a Scottish footballer, who played for Hibernian, Barnsley, Berwick Rangers and Toronto City.

In the summer of 1962, he played abroad in the Eastern Canada Professional Soccer League with Toronto City. In 1964, he returned to play for Toronto City. In 1966, he signed with league rivals Toronto Roma. The following season he re-signed with Toronto Roma to play in the National Soccer League. In 1968, he continued playing in the National Soccer League with the Toronto Ukrainians.
