= Darren Brownlie =

Scottish footballer (born 1994)

Personal information
- Date of birth: 10 April 1994 (age 32)
- Place of birth: Bellshill, Scotland
- Height: 1.90 m (6 ft 3 in)
- Position: Centre-back

Team information
- Current team: Cumnock Juniors

Senior career*
| Years | Team | Apps | (Gls) |
| 2012–2013 | Ayr United | 14 | (0) |
| 2013–2014 | Partick Thistle | 0 | (0) |
| 2014 | → Cowdenbeath (loan) | 11 | (0) |
| 2014–2015 | Cowdenbeath | 23 | (1) |
| 2015–2020 | Queen of the South | 122 | (4) |
| 2020–2023 | Partick Thistle | 47 | (1) |
| 2023 | Dundalk | 7 | (0) |
| 2024– | Cumnock Juniors | | |
- * Club domestic league appearances and goals as of 00:49, 22 January 2025 (UTC)

Darren Brownlie (born 10 April 1994) is a Scottish footballer who plays as a centre-back for who plays for Lowland League West club Cumnock Juniors. He previously played for Ayr United, Cowdenbeath, Queen of the South, Partick Thistle over two spells and Dundalk.

== Career ==
=== Ayr United ===
Born in Bellshill, Brownlie started his career at Ayr United. Brownlie debuted for the Honest Men on 8 July 2012 in the first round of the Scottish Challenge Cup, playing the full match of a 3–1 defeat, away to East Stirlingshire. Two weeks later, Brownlie made his first Scottish Football League appearance, playing the full match in a 1–1 Scottish Division Two draw with Stenhousemuir at Somerset Park. In the last of his 16 league games that season, a 2–1 loss at Forfar Athletic, Brownlie was sent off after two bookings, the first for conceding a penalty kick, with a foul on Chris Templeman and the second for dissent after the referee's decision to award the spot kick.

=== Partick Thistle and Cowdenbeath ===
In August 2013, Brownlie joined Partick Thistle. Brownlie scored in a 4–0 win over Falkirk for the Firhill club's under-20's that month but did not make a senior appearance and was loaned out to Scottish Championship club Cowdenbeath on 17 January 2014 for the remainder of that season. Brownlie made 11 league appearances for the Blue Brazil and also played their four play-off matches as they retained their status in the second tier of Scottish football, with victories over former club Ayr United and Dunfermline Athletic respectively.

At that end of the season Brownlie joined Cowdenbeath on a permanent deal. Brownlie played 23 league games in a season which ended in relegation, although Brownlie did manage to score his first senior career goal on 14 February 2015, away to Dumbarton in a match the Blue Brazil won 2–1.

=== Queen of the South ===
On 17 June 2015, Brownlie returned to the Scottish Championship, after signing for Queen of the South. The Queens manager at that time, James Fowler, had been a team-mate of Brownlie's at Central Park, in a loan spell in Fife in 2014 from parent club Kilmarnock.

On 28 April 2018, Brownlie extended his contract to remain with the Doonhamers until the end of the 2018-19 season.

Before the start of the 2018-19 season, Brownlie picked up an injury that kept him out of the first-team squad at Palmerston until February 2019.

On 26 February 2019, Brownlie started his first match of the 2018-19 season, in a 1–0 defeat at Cappielow versus Greenock Morton.

On 23 May 2019, Brownlie extended his contract with Queens until the end of the 2019-20 season.

On 5 October 2019, Brownlie scored the winning goal in the Doonhamers 1-0 win versus Partick Thistle at Firhill Stadium in the 60th minute.

=== Return to Partick Thistle ===
During December 2019, Brownlie signed a pre-contract to join Partick Thistle during the 2020 close season, although on 27 January 2020, Brownlie departed the Doonhamers and signed a two-and-a-half-year contract with Thistle for an undisclosed fee before the end of the January 2020 transfer window.

Following winning the League One title with Thistle, Brownlie added an extra year on to his contract with the club.

Brownlie scored his first Thistle goal in a 4–1 defeat in the Scottish Cup to Premiership side Aberdeen.

Brownlie scored his first league goal for Thistle, opening the scoring in a 2–2 draw away to Raith Rovers on the final league game of the 2022/23 season.

Following Partick Thistle's premiership play off final defeat on penalties to Ross County Brownlie left Thistle.

=== Dundalk ===
On 6 July 2023, Brownlie signed for League of Ireland Premier Division side Dundalk.

== Honours ==
=== Club ===
Partick Thistle

- Scottish League One: 2020–21
