= Deaths in February 2009 =

The following is a list of notable deaths in February 2009.

Entries for each day are listed alphabetically by surname. A typical entry lists information in the following sequence:

- Name, age, country of citizenship at birth, subsequent country of citizenship (if applicable), reason for notability, cause of death (if known), and reference.

== February 2009 ==
=== 1 ===
- Charles W. Akers, 88, American historian.
- Joe Ades, 74, American salesman.
- Anna Donald, 42, Australian epidemiologist, breast cancer.
- Lukas Foss, 86, American composer, conductor, pianist and educator, heart attack.
- Tim Grundy, 50, British radio and television presenter, heart attack.
- Michael Homer, 50, American business executive (Netscape), Creutzfeldt–Jakob disease.
- Ranbir Singh Hooda, 94, Indian politician, after long illness.
- Peter Howson, 89, Australian politician, Minister for Air (1964–1968) and Environment, Aborigines and the Arts (1971–1972), fall.
- Arieh Levavi, 96, Lithuanian-born Israeli public servant, ambassador to Argentina during capture of Adolf Eichmann.
- Yoya Martínez, 96, Chilean actress, natural causes.
- Jim McWithey, 81, American race car driver.
- Roy Magee, 79, Northern Irish peace activist.
- Sir Alan Muir Wood, 87, British civil engineer.
- Edward Joseph O'Donnell, 77, American Roman Catholic prelate, Bishop of Lafayette (1994–2002).
- John Roy Whinnery, 92, American electrical engineer and educator.

=== 2 ===
- Donald Alexander, 87, American government official, Commissioner of the Internal Revenue Service (1973–1977), cancer.
- Paul Birch, 46, English footballer (Aston Villa, Wolves), bone cancer.
- Ralph Carpenter, 99, American antique and architecture preservationist, natural causes.
- Alan Davies, 75, English rugby league player, (Oldham, Wigan, Great Britain).
- Lublin Dilja, 51, Albanian ambassador.
- Yusril Djalinus, 64, Indonesian journalist, co-founder of Tempo Magazine, stroke.
- Phil Easton, 59, English radio presenter and football announcer.
- Russ Germain, 62, Canadian radio presenter, lung cancer.
- Paul Galloway, 74, American journalist (Chicago Sun-Times, Chicago Tribune), heart attack.
- Susan Hibbert, 84, British secretary, last surviving British witness to signing of the World War II German Instrument of Surrender.
- Howard Kanovitz, 79, American painter, bacterial infection after heart surgery.
- Ralph Kaplowitz, 89, American basketball player (New York Knicks), kidney failure.
- Fredrik Kayser, 90, Norwegian resistance fighter during World War II, after long illness.
- John A. Knight, 77, American church leader, General Superintendent of the Church of the Nazarene (1985–2001).
- James E. Long, 68, American politician, North Carolina Commissioner of Insurance (1985–2009), complications of a stroke.
- Jean Martin, 86, French actor (The Battle of Algiers, The Day of the Jackal), cancer.
- Ezzat Negahban, 82, Iranian archaeologist.
- Louis Proost, 73, Belgian racing cyclist.
- Joe M. Rodgers, 75, American construction executive, Ambassador to France (1985–1989), cancer.
- Sunny Skylar, 95, American songwriter.
- Ralf Veidemann, 96, Estonian footballer.
- Jim Wilson, 67, American football player (San Francisco 49ers) and wrestler, cancer.
- Kazuhiro Yamauchi, 76, Japanese baseball player, liver failure.

=== 3 ===
- Ben Blank, 87, American television graphics innovator (CBS, ABC), complications from a stroke.
- Tom Brumley, 73, American steel guitarist (The Buckaroos), heart attack.
- Rabindra Kumar Das Gupta, 93, Indian scholar of Bengali and English literature.
- Kurt Demmler, 65, German songwriter, suicide by hanging.
- Sid Finney, 79, British ice hockey player.
- Millard Fuller, 74, American co-founder of Habitat for Humanity International, after short illness.
- Henry Hsu, 96, Chinese-born Taiwanese athlete and politician, MLY (1973–1987), heart failure.
- Warren Kimbro, 74, American Black Panther member, convicted murderer and charitable organization executive, heart attack.
- Mike Maloy, 59, American-born Austrian basketball player, influenza.
- Max Neuhaus, 69, American musician, cancer.
- António dos Reis Rodrigues, 90, Portuguese Roman Catholic prelate Bishop of Madarsuma (1966–1998).
- Jorge Serguera, 76, Cuban journalist, President of the Cuban Institute of Radio and Television (death announced on this date).
- Sheng-yen, 79, Chinese-born Taiwanese Buddhist Zen master, kidney disease.
- Pavlo Zahrebelnyi, 84, Ukrainian writer, after long illness.

=== 4 ===
- Antonie Dixon, 40, New Zealand murderer, suicide.
- Christophe Dupouey, 40, French cyclist, World Cross Country Champion (1996), suicide.
- Arnljot Eggen, 85, Norwegian writer.
- Ramón Hernández, 68, Puerto Rican baseball player.
- Lux Interior, 62, American singer, songwriter and musician (The Cramps), aortic dissection.
- Ed Schwartz, 62, American radio personality, kidney and heart disease.
- Mark Shepherd, 86, American chairman of Texas Instruments (1976–1988), complications from pulmonary fibrosis.
- David Snow, 84, British ornithologist.

=== 5 ===
- Sigurd Andersson, 82, Swedish Olympic bronze medal-winning (1952) cross-country skier.
- Albert Barillé, 88, French television screenwriter and producer.
- John W. Grace, 82, Canadian Privacy Commissioner (1983–1990), heart attack.
- Khalid Hasan, 74, Pakistani journalist and author, cancer.
- George Hughes, 83, American football player (Pittsburgh Steelers).
- Payton Jordan, 91, American coach of 1968 United States Olympic track and field team, cancer.
- Frederiek Nolf, 21, Belgian professional road bicycle racer.
- Leo Orenstein, 89, Canadian director, producer and writer.
- Raaphi Persitz, 74, Israeli chess master.
- Dana Vávrová, 41, Czech-German actress and film director, cervical cancer.
- Noah Weinberg, 78, American-born Israeli rabbi, founder of Aish HaTorah.
- Xiangzhong Yang, 49, Chinese-born American stem cell scientist, cancer.
- Anthony Finigan, 83, British actor.

=== 6 ===
- Bashir Ahmad, 68, Indian-born Scottish politician, MSP for Glasgow region, heart attack.
- Philip Carey, 83, American actor (One Life to Live), lung cancer.
- Anthony Finigan, 83, British actor.
- Alfred Flores, 92, Guamanian rancher and politician, member of the Legislature of Guam.
- George Karpati, 74, Canadian neurologist.
- Shirley Jean Rickert, 82, American actress (Our Gang).
- Susan Walsh, 60, American actress (Female Trouble, Pink Flamingos, Multiple Maniacs).
- James Whitmore, 87, American actor (Oklahoma!. Planet of the Apes, The Shawshank Redemption), Emmy winner (2000), lung cancer.

=== 7 ===
- Molly Bee, 69, American country singer ("I Saw Mommy Kissing Santa Claus"), complications from a stroke.
- Jack Cover, 88, American scientist, inventor of the Taser, pneumonia.
- Blossom Dearie, 82, American jazz singer and pianist (Schoolhouse Rock!), after long illness.
- Reg Evans, 80, Australian actor, bushfire.
- John Gabler, 78, American baseball pitcher (New York Yankees, Washington Senators).
- Sir George Godber, 100, British physician and public servant, Chief Medical Officer (1960–1973).
- Richard Gordon, 61, British author, heart attack.
- Joe Haverty, 72, Irish footballer (Arsenal, Blackburn Rovers, Millwall, Republic of Ireland).
- Betty Jameson, 89, American golfer, three-time major championship winner.
- Jacques Lancelot, 88, French clarinetist, heart failure.
- Mel Kaufman, 50, American football player (Washington Redskins).
- Brian Naylor, 78, Australian news presenter, bushfire.
- Jorge Reyes, 56, Mexican musician (Chac Mool), heart attack.
- Piotr Stańczak, 42, Polish geologist, beheaded.
- Richard Zann, 64, Australian ornithologist, bushfire.

=== 8 ===
- Marian Cozma, 26, Romanian handball player, stabbed.
- William Alexander Deer, 98, British geologist, Vice-Chancellor of the University of Cambridge (1971–1973).
- Sigurdur Helgason, 87, Icelandic business executive, CEO of Icelandair and pioneer of low cost airlines.
- Harry Hillaker, 89, American aeronautical engineer.
- Paul Himmel, 94-95, American photographer.
- Wenche Klouman, 90, Norwegian actress.
- Wesley L. McDonald, 84, American admiral and naval aviator.
- Neil McNeill, 87, Australian politician, member of the House of Representatives (1961–1963).
- Giorgio Melchiori, 88, Italian literary critic.
- Francis Dennis Ramsay, 83, Scottish painter.
- Terry Spencer, 90, British RAF fighter pilot and war photographer, cancer.
- Bob Stephen, 50, Canadian football player, heart attack.

=== 9 ===
- Robert Anderson, 91, American Academy Award–nominated playwright and screenwriter, pneumonia.
- Kazys Bradūnas, 91, Lithuanian émigré poet and editor.
- Marc Burrows, 30, British footballer, cancer.
- Gareth Alban Davies, 82, British academic and poet.
- Reg Davies, 79, Welsh footballer (Newcastle United, Swansea Town, Wales).
- Eluana Englaro, 38, Italian patient in right to die case, withdrawal of nutrition.
- Neville Hamilton, 48, British footballer.
- Webster Kitchell, 77, American religious leader.
- Vic Lewis, 89, British jazz guitarist.
- Orlando "Cachaíto" López, 76, Cuban bassist (Buena Vista Social Club), complications from prostate surgery.
- Don Maclennan, 79, South African poet and playwright.
- Maria Orwid, 78, Polish psychiatrist.
- Peer Portner, 69, Kenyan-born British developer of ventricular assist device, cancer.
- Sean F. Scott, 39, American amyotrophic lateral sclerosis activist, amyotrophic lateral sclerosis.

=== 10 ===
- Jan Błoński, 78, Polish literary critic, Holocaust scholar.
- Carolyn George, 81, American dancer and photographer, primary lateral sclerosis.
- Eva Gustavson, 91, Norwegian-American contralto.
- Leila Hadley, 83, American travel writer.
- Philippe Kourouma, 76, Guinean Roman Catholic prelate, Bishop of N’Zérékoré.
- Berting Labra, 75, Filipino character actor, emphysema.
- Jeremy Lusk, 24, American motocross racer, brain injury.
- Jean-Baptiste Mintsa-Mi-Mba, 60, Gabonese politician.
- Nate Schenker, 91, American football player.

=== 11 ===
- Estelle Bennett, 67, American singer (The Ronettes), colon cancer.
- Fred Graves, 84, Canadian Olympic rower.
- Virgil Lee Griffin, 64, American Ku Klux Klan leader.
- Vlastibor Klimeš, 84, Czech architect.
- Willem Johan Kolff, 97, Dutch-born American physician, inventor of the artificial kidney.
- Sir Peter Leng, 83, British Army general.
- Penny Ramsey, 61, Australian actress, cancer.
- Rail Rzayev, 64, Azerbaijani general, head of the Air Force, shot.
- Marina Svetlova, 86, French-born American ballerina and teacher, complications from stroke.
- Mildred Wolfe, 96, American artist, after long illness.
- Shyamala Gopalan, 70, Tamil-born American biomedical scientist, colon cancer.

=== 12 ===
- Hermann Becht, 69, German opera singer.
- Vasanti N. Bhat-Nayak, 70, Indian professor of combinatorics and graph theory.
- Giacomo Bulgarelli, 68, Italian footballer, after long illness.
- Evan Ira Farber, 87, American Faculty Emeritus (Earlham College).
- Ed Grothus, 85, American anti-nuclear activist, cancer.
- Lis Hartel, 87, Danish equestrian.
- Hugh Leonard, 82, Irish playwright, multiple ailments.
- Mat Mathews, 84, Dutch jazz accordionist.
- Domenica Niehoff, 63, German prostitution activist, complications from lung disease.
- Malcolm Toon, 92, American ambassador (Czechoslovakia 1969–71, Yugoslavia 1971–75, Israel 1975–76, USSR 1976–79).
- Ted Uhlaender, 68, American baseball player (Minnesota Twins, Cleveland Indians, Cincinnati Reds), heart attack.
- Aasiya Zubair, 36, American businesswoman, co-founder of Bridges TV, beheaded.
- Notable Americans killed in the crash of Colgan Air Flight 3407:
  - Alison Des Forges, 66, human rights activist.
  - Beverly Eckert, 57, activist, member of the 9/11 Family Steering Committee.
  - Coleman Mellett, 34, jazz guitarist.
  - Gerry Niewood, 65, jazz saxophonist.
  - Susan Wehle, 55, jewish renewal cantor.

=== 13 ===
- Gianna Maria Canale, 81, Italian actress.
- Joe Goldstein, 81, American sports promoter, heart attack and stroke.
- Geshe Gyeltsen, 85, Tibetan spiritual leader, founder of Thubten Dhargye Ling.
- Alfred J. Kahn, 90, American child welfare expert.
- Jean Laroyenne, 78, French Olympic bronze medal-winning (1952) fencer.
- Dilys Laye, 74, British actress, cancer.
- Julius Patching, 92, Australian Olympic official.
- Corky Trinidad, 69, Filipino-born American cartoonist, pancreatic cancer.
- Edward Upward, 105, British writer, chest infection.
- Bakhtiyar Vahabzadeh, 83, Azerbaijani poet, after long illness.

=== 14 ===
- Sir Bernard Ashley, 82, British businessman, cancer.
- Louie Bellson, 84, American jazz drummer, complications from Parkinson's disease.
- Geoffrey Collin, 87, British army general.
- Luís Andrés Edo, 82, Spanish anarchist.
- Kjersti Graver, 63, Norwegian public servant, Consumer Ombudsman (1987–1995).
- Buck Griffin, 85, American rockabilly musician, heart failure.
- Alfred A. Knopf Jr., 90, American publisher, son of Alfred A. Knopf, complications from fall.
- John McGlinn, 55, American conductor and historian of musicals.
- Boris Yavitz, 85, Georgian-born American academic, dean of Columbia Business School (1975–1982), prostate cancer.

=== 15 ===
- Joe Cuba, 78, American musician, complications of a bacterial infection.
- Noble Doss, 88, American football player.
- Diether Haenicke, 73, American academic, Western Michigan University President (1985–1998, 2006–2007), head injury.
- William R. Sharpe Jr., 80, American politician, West Virginia Senate (1960–1980, 1984–2009), President pro tem (1990–2009).
- Carl Venne, 62, American chairman of the Crow Nation since 2002, natural causes.

=== 16 ===
- Pyotr Abrassimov, 96, Belarusian partisan.
- Dorothy Bridges, 93, American actress and poet, wife of Lloyd Bridges, mother of Beau and Jeff Bridges, age-related causes.
- Konrad Dannenberg, 96, German-born American rocket scientist, natural causes.
- Sir Ernest Harrison, 82, British businessman.
- Stephen Kim Sou-hwan, 86, South Korean Roman Catholic prelate, Archbishop of Seoul (1968–1998).
- Edward Salia, 56, Ghanaian politician, Minister of State (1995), throat infection.
- Travis, 13, American-born chimpanzee, television commercial animal, shot.

=== 17 ===
- Doris Abrahams, 88, American theatrical producer (Equus), heart failure.
- Eric Blau, 87, American theatrical producer (Jacques Brel is Alive and Well and Living in Paris), pneumonia.
- Conchita Cintrón, 86, Chilean-born Portuguese bullfighter, heart attack.
- Edhi Handoko, 48, Indonesian chess grandmaster, heart attack.
- Hisae Imai, 77, Japanese photographer.
- Victor Kiernan, 95, British historian.
- Gazanfer Özcan, 78, Turkish actor, heart failure.
- Robert Robideau, 61, American Native Americans activist.
- Shabnam Romani, 80, Pakistani poet and writer, after long illness.
- Gyula Sáringer, 81, Hungarian agronomist.
- Brad Van Pelt, 57, American football player (New York Giants), heart attack.
- Mike Whitmarsh, 46, American beach volleyball and basketball player, suicide by carbon monoxide poisoning.

=== 18 ===
- Jacques Bino, 50, French Guadeloupean trade union official, shot.
- Viking Björk, 90, Swedish surgeon.
- J. Max Bond Jr., 73, American architect, cancer.
- Chet Bulger, 91, American football player (Chicago Cardinals), natural causes.
- Snooks Eaglin, 73, American guitarist, heart attack.
- Raymond Alvah Hanson, 85, American inventor.
- John Kanzius, 64, American inventor, pneumonia.
- Robert Luff, 94, British theatre producer and impresario.
- Luigi Nobile, 87, Italian footballer.
- Tayeb Salih, 80, Sudanese writer (Season of Migration to the North).
- Kamila Skolimowska, 26, Polish hammer thrower, 2000 Olympics gold medalist, pulmonary embolism.
- Miika Tenkula, 34, Finnish guitarist and songwriter (Sentenced).
- Andrew Tsien Chih-ch'un, 83, Taiwanese Roman Catholic prelate, Bishop of Hwalien (1992–2001), heart attack.

=== 19 ===
- Jerry Anderson, 76, Puerto Rican diver.
- Frank Carlton, 72, English rugby league player.
- Ronald Dearing, Baron Dearing, 78, British life peer and civil servant, cancer.
- Kelly Groucutt, 63, British bass guitar player (Electric Light Orchestra), heart attack.
- Edmund Hlawka, 92, Austrian mathematician.
- Ibrahim Hussein, 72, Malaysian artist, heart attack.
- Ian Jenkins, 64, British public official, Surgeon General (2002–2006), Constable and Governor of Windsor Castle (2008–2009).
- Oreste Lionello, 81, Italian actor and voice actor.
- Nonnie Moore, 87, American fashion editor (GQ, Harper's Bazaar), choking accident.
- Raymond Mulinghausen, 88, French Olympic diver.
- Keith W. Nolan, 44, American military historian.
- Harrison Ridley Jr., 70, American jazz presenter, after short illness.
- Anna Watt, 85, British entertainer (Fran and Anna), natural causes.
- Thomas Welsh, 87, American Roman Catholic prelate, Bishop of Allentown (1983–1997).
- James White, 86, British politician, MP for Glasgow Pollok (1970–1987).

=== 20 ===
- Marcella Althaus-Reid, 56, Argentine-born British Queer theologian, professor of contextual theology (University of Edinburgh).
- Friedrich Berentzen, 81, German industrialist.
- James I. C. Boyd, 87, British railway historian.
- Fine Cotton, 32, Australian thoroughbred racehorse involved in sports betting substitution scandal.
- Antonio De Rosso, 68, Italian religious leader, founder of the Orthodox Church in Italy.
- Roland Gutsch, 83, German engineer.
- Mary Jacobus, 52, American journalist, cerebral hemorrhage.
- William J. Jorden, 85, American journalist and diplomat, lung cancer.
- Larry H. Miller, 64, American businessman, owner of the Utah Jazz, complications of diabetes.
- Christopher Nolan, 43, Irish author, winner of the Whitbread Prize (1988), pulmonary aspiration.
- Július Nôta, 37, Slovak footballer and coach, stabbed.
- Robert Quarry, 83, American film and television actor.
- Fats Sadi, 81, Belgian jazz musician, vocalist and composer.
- Socks, 19, American Presidential cat of the Clinton family, euthanized.
- Shraga Weil, 90, Israeli painter.

=== 21 ===
- Ian Alger, 82, American psychiatrist, heart failure.
- François De Pauw, 82, Belgian Olympic basketball player.
- Fannie Kauffman, 84, Canadian-born Mexican actress and comedian, natural causes.
- Ilya Piatetski-Shapiro, 79, Russian-born Israeli mathematician, Parkinson's disease.
- Mary Printz, 85, American switchboard operator, inspiration for Bells Are Ringing.
- Wilton G. S. Sankawulo, 71, Liberian politician and academic, Chairman of the Council of State (1995–1996), heart failure.
- Victor Zarnowitz, 89, Polish-born American economist, heart attack.

=== 22 ===
- Candido Cannavò, 78, Italian sports journalist, editor-in-chief of La Gazzetta dello Sport (1983–2002), cerebral hemorrhage.
- Barbara Marshall, 64, American journalist and politician, member of the Honolulu City Council since 2002, colon cancer.
- Rhena Schweitzer Miller, 90, American humanitarian, daughter of Albert Schweitzer.
- Derrell Palmer, 86, American football player (Cleveland Browns), natural causes.
- Paul Joseph Phạm Đình Tụng, 89, Vietnamese Roman Catholic prelate and cardinal, archbishop of Hanoi (1994–2005).
- Sławomir Rutka, 33, Polish football player, suicide by hanging.
- Safi Taha, 85, Lebanese Olympic wrestler.
- Howard Zieff, 81, American film director (Private Benjamin, My Girl, The Main Event), complications from Parkinson's disease.

=== 23 ===
- Marie Boas Hall, 89, American historian.
- Dean Champion, 69, American professor of criminal justice, leukemia.
- Tom Cole, 75, American screenwriter and playwright, multiple myeloma.
- Sverre Fehn, 84, Norwegian architect.
- Lorna Frampton, 88, British Olympic swimmer.
- Frank Gallacher, 65, Scottish-born Australian actor.
- Elizabeth Bradford Holbrook, 96, Canadian portrait sculptor.
- August Kiuru, 86, Finnish Olympic silver medal-winning (1948, 1956) cross-country skier.
- Seppo Kolehmainen, 76, Finnish actor, after long illness.
- James Leslie, 50, British politician, member of the Northern Ireland Assembly for North Antrim (1998–2003), heart attack.
- Noel Martin, 86, American graphic designer, leukemia.
- Laurence Payne, 89, British actor (Sexton Blake).
- Tuulikki Pietilä, 92, Finnish graphic artist.
- Franciszek Starowieyski, 78, Polish artist.
- Jean Studer, 94, Swiss Olympic athlete.
- Scott Symons, 75, Canadian writer.
- David Taylor, 79, American banker.

=== 24 ===
- Jean Battersby, 80, Australian arts executive, esophageal cancer.
- Svatopluk Havelka, 83, Czech composer.
- Edward Judd, 76, British actor (The Day the Earth Caught Fire).
- Antoinette K-Doe, 66, American bar owner, heart attack.
- Pearl Lang, 87, American dancer and choreographer, heart attack.
- James D. McGinnis, 77, American politician, Lieutenant Governor of Delaware (1977–1981), cancer.

=== 25 ===
- Randall Bewley, 53, American guitarist (Pylon), heart attack.
- Pip Borrman, 54, Australian aerobatics pilot, plane crash.
- Ian Carr, 75, British writer and musician (Nucleus), after long illness.
- Philip José Farmer, 91, American writer (Riverworld).
- Bill Holm, 65, American author and poet, heart attack.
- Molly Kool, 93, Canadian sailor, North America's first licensed female sea captain.
- Roger C. Kormendi, 59, American economist, Creutzfeldt–Jakob disease.
- Howard Menger, 87, American ufologist.
- Eisha Stephen Atieno Odhiambo, 63, Kenyan academic, dementia.
- Clarence Swensen, 91, American actor (munchkin in The Wizard of Oz), complications of a stroke.
- Max Théret, 96, French businessman, founder of the Fnac electronics retailer.
- Bangladeshi military officers killed in the Bangladesh Rifles revolt:
  - Shakil Ahmed, 51, director general of BGB (since 2006).
  - Gulzar Uddin Ahmed, 44, army colonel.
  - Mujibul Haque, 51, army colonel.
  - Mohammad Shawkat Imam, 47, army colonel.
  - Quadrat Elahi Rahman Shafique, 46, army colonel.

=== 26 ===
- Rick Beckett, 54, American radio broadcaster (WOOD (AM)), heart attack.
- William H. Behle, 99, American ornithologist.
- Ruth Drexel, 78, German actress (Der Bulle von Tölz).
- Johnny Kerr, 76, American basketball player, coach, and color commentator (Chicago Bulls), prostate cancer.
- Morley Street, 25, British racehorse.
- Sir Michael Quinlan, 78, British civil servant, Permanent Secretary at the Ministry of Defence (1988–1992).
- Wendy Richard, 65, British actress (Are You Being Served?, EastEnders), breast cancer.
- Nell Soto, 82, American politician, member of the California State Senate (2000–2006), complications from stroke.
- Ruth Spalding, 95, British actor, director and writer.
- Wilbert Tatum, 76, American publisher (New York Amsterdam News), multiple organ failure.
- Norm Van Lier, 61, American basketball player (Chicago Bulls).

=== 27 ===
- Rosalie Silber Abrams, 92, American politician.
- John Alvin, 91, American actor, complications of a fall.
- Alan Landers, 68, American smoking model turned opponent, throat and lung cancer.
- Robert E. A. Lee, 87, American documentary film producer, cancer.
- James Page Mackey, 95, Canadian chief of Toronto Police Service (1958–1970).
- Manea Mănescu, 92, Romanian prime minister (1974–1979).
- Alastair McCorquodale, 83, British athlete and cricketer, silver medallist at the 1948 Summer Olympics.
- John Francis Marchment Middleton, 87, British anthropologist.
- Gerriet Postma, 76, Dutch painter.
- Dorothea Holt Redmond, 98, American movie artist and illustrator.
- Geoffrey Smith, 80, British gardening expert and presenter.

=== 28 ===
- Tomás Altamirano Mantovani, 49, Panamanian politician, National Assembly deputy, traffic accident.
- Mark H. Beers, 54, American geriatrician, complications from diabetes.
- Ode Burrell, 69, American football player (Houston Oilers), complications from diabetes.
- Paul Harvey, 90, American radio broadcaster.
- Johnny Holiday, 96, American actor.
- Alvin Klein, 73, American theater critic, heart attack.
- Manila, 26, American Thoroughbred racehorse, aortic ring rupture.
- Miguel Serrano, 91, Chilean poet, diplomat and neo-Nazi, stroke.
- Richard A. Sofio, 62, American politician and former member of the Michigan House of Representatives from 1987 to 1990.
- Tom Sturdivant, 78, American baseball player (New York Yankees).
