= Karl Ristenpart =

German conductor

- Karl Ristenpart, in the 1960s
- Born: 26 January 1900; Kiel, Germany
- Died: 24 December 1967 (aged 67); Lisbon, Portugal
- Occupation: Conductor

Karl Ristenpart (26 January 1900 – 24 December 1967) was a German conductor.

== Career ==
Born in Kiel, Germany, he studied at the Stern Conservatory in Berlin and in Vienna. He was heavily involved in creating three orchestras in his lifetime, most notably the Chamber Orchestra of the Saar. With this group he created one of the earliest recorded collections of Bach's orchestral music. These recordings were made between 1954 and 1967 as Les Discophiles Français, Erato and Club Français du Disque releases in France and appeared then under license with various American labels (notably Nonesuch) on both LP and cassette.

Following an out-of-print period, in 2000 the French Accord label, Universal released a six-CD set comprising the entire set of Ristenpart recordings of Bach orchestral works. The conductor and his colleagues from Saarbrücken also recorded performances of works by Mozart and Haydn, among others. The lasting fame he received for these interpretations of Baroque and early Classical music overshadowed the fact that with his Saar orchestra he actually recorded works by approximately 230 composers, at least half of them belonging to the 20th century, for the Saar radio. A possible influence in this direction was Hermann Scherchen, with whom Ristenpart's mother was acquainted before 1914 and to whom she was married between 1919 and 1920. (Hermann Scherchen was a politically active conductor responsible for the premiere performances of what were at the time controversial pieces by composers such as Berg and Xenakis.)

In 1932 Ristenpart became the conductor of a little string ensemble in Berlin, whose core was composed of women friends of his wife, the pianist and harpsichordist Ruth Christensen. This ensemble came to be known as the Karl Ristenpart Chamber Orchestra and often played for the Berlin radio and the Deutschlandsender, mostly for exhausting live night broadcasts abroad. But Ristenpart's career as a promising young conductor in Germany was hobbled by his refusal to join the Nazi Party.

Following World War II, Ristenpart returned to devastated Berlin and put works by Gustav Mahler, his favorite composer, on the program of his first public concert in the summer of 1945. With Berlin divided into several foreign sectors, his unblemished political record allowed him to be named conductor for the "Radio in the American Sector" of Berlin (RIAS). In 1946 he thus started to record music, from Monteverdi to Stravinsky, with the forces of his former Karl Ristenpart Chamber Orchestra, supplemented by vocal soloists and top musicians from other Berlin orchestras, under the label "RIAS-Choir and Chamber Orchestra". This constituted the second of his important periods of orchestra development and the beginning of his breakthrough to international fame as a conductor, which was mostly built on his ambitious J.S. Bach concert cycle from March 1947 to December 1952. From this period dates the legendary Archiv production featuring baritone Dietrich Fischer-Dieskau and Hermann Töttcher playing oboe and oboe da caccia in Bach's cantatas Ich will den Kreuzstab gerne tragen, BWV 56 and Ich habe genug, BWV 82. But the worsening of the post-war political situation in Germany in the early 1950s, particularly in Berlin where circulating between the various sectors became increasingly difficult, also created financial problems for radio broadcasting. When it became clear at the end of 1952 that the RIAS could not go on subsidizing all its orchestras, Ristenpart accepted an offer to create a new chamber orchestra for the Saar radio, with which he was also to produce LPs for Les Discophiles français (an unusual arrangement linked to the fact that the "autonomous" Saar region was still under French administration at the time).

Ristenpart began working in the summer of 1953 as conductor of the Saar Chamber Orchestra, which, out of an initial 16, included 10 young musicians who had come along with him from Berlin. Among them were the Hendel Quartet, whose leader, Georg Friedrich Hendel, became the orchestra's first violin soloist. The ensuing collaboration with top French instrumental soloists was especially fruitful, leading to many tours, recordings and partnerships with soloists such as flautist Jean-Pierre Rampal and the members of his wind ensemble Le Quintette à vent Français. Some 170 LP-records featuring Ristenpart and his Saar Chamber Orchestra have been marketed under license by various record companies all over the world. These include two complete sets of the Brandenburg concertos, the Orchestral Suites and The Art of Fugue, several albums of Bach vocal cantatas, many Telemann, Vivaldi, many Mozart and Haydn works, but also award-winning records of Britten, Roussel and Hindemith pieces.

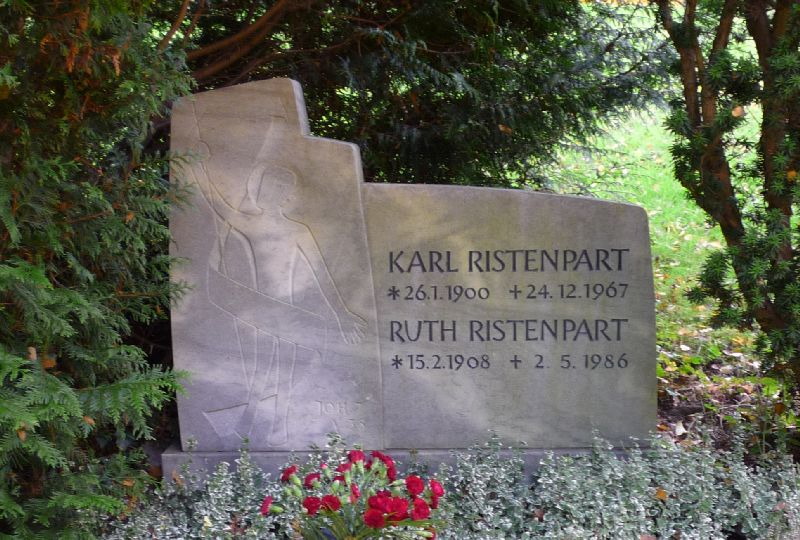
Ristenpart's grave at the St. Johann cemetery at Saarbrücken

In December 1967, Ristenpart suffered a heart attack while on tour in Portugal with the chamber orchestra of the Gulbenkian Foundation and died in a Lisbon hospital on Christmas Eve. The Chamber Orchestra of the Saar was unable to survive long the dimming of its guiding light. After four years under the baton of the reputable cellist Antonio Janigro, and the death in a car accident of its core musicians, first-violin Georg Friedrich Hendel and his wife Betty Hindrichs-Hendel, first-cellist, it merged with the Saarbrücken Radio Symphony Orchestra in 1973.

== Discography ==
Original LP recordings

Karl Ristenpart left :

- only one LP of his production with his Chamber Orchestra in Berlin (Archiv 14004 with Bach cantatas 56 and 82 interpreted by Dietrich Fischer-Dieskau and Hermann Töttcher);

- 169 LPs with the Saar Chamber Orchestra, of which 2 were made in Germany (Archiv and Elektrola) and 167 in France (2 Lumen, 4 Club National du Disque, 1 Harmonia Mundi, 95 Les Discophiles Français, 24 Erato, 42 Club Français du Disque);

- 4 with the Radio Symphony Orchestra Stuttgart (Checkmate, USA).

Reissues as CDs

- Archiv 14004 with cantatas 56 and 82 was reissued by Polydor International/DG Classics in 1997 and again since.

- several LPs of Club Français du Disque, Musidisc and Erato with Bach, Mozart and Haydn works were reissued as CDs in the 1980s and 1990s under the labels Accord or Erato (see www.amazon.fr);

- ACCORD/UNIVERSAL issued a 6-CD set with Bach orchestral works (including the Brandenburgs, the Suites and The Art of Fugue) in 2000; a 4-CD set entitled "L'art de Teresa Stich-Randall" which includes sacred compositions by Bach, Handel, Mozart and Schubert in which the soprano is accompanied by Ristenpart’s Saar Orchestra, in 2005; a double-CD set with cantatas 56, 82, Wachet auf, ruft uns die Stimme, BWV 140, Gott soll allein mein Herze haben, BWV 169, Coffee Cantata, and 212 in 2006.

- a wide selection of Ristenpart recordings which had been issued as LPs by Nonesuch can be ordered as CDs in the USA from www.rediscovery.us;

- the Association Jean-Pierre Rampal has started reissuing most of the early Saar radio tapes (1954–1985) with Ristenpart’s orchestra and French soloists as CD sets under its label Premiers Horizons Disques (www.jprampal.com). Works of Frank Martin, Willy Burkhard, Peter Mieg, Jean-Michel Damase and others.

- "The RIAS Bach Cantatas Project" Audite 21415 is a 9-CD set issued in 2012 taken from the RIAS-Berlin archives (today with Deutschlandradio Kultur) of 29 Bach Cantatas among the 70 recorded by Karl Ristenpart in the period from 1949 to 1952 (planned initially as a complete recording). These studio recordings include J.S. Bach Cantatas BWV 4, BWV 19, 21, 22, 31, 32, 37, 38, 39, 42, 47, 52, 56, 58, 73, 76, 79, 88, 106, 108, 127, 140, 160, 164, 176, 178, 180, 199, and 202). KARL RISTENPART conducts the RIAS Kammerorchester, the RIAS Kammerchor, the RIAS Knabenchor and the following soloists: Helmut Krebs | Agnes Giebel | Ingrid Lorenzen | Dietrich Fischer-Dieskau | Walter Hauck | Gunthild Weber | Annelies Westen | Johanna Behrend | Marie-Luise Denicke | Lorri Lail | Lilo Rolwes | Gerhard Niese | Edith Berger-Krebs | Gertrud Birmele | Charlotte Wolf-Matthäus | Gerda Lammers.

== Sources ==
- Charles W. Scheel. Karl Ristenpart: Die Werkstätten des Dirigenten: Berlin, Paris, Saarbrücken. Saarbrücken, SDV, 1999 (www.amazon.de). This biography contains many photos, detailed charts of Ristenpart’s productions and a CD with 4 recordings of the Saar Chamber Orchestra under Ristenpart (Mozart, Sinfonia concertante for 4 winds and orchestra (Pierre Pierlot, oboe; Jacques Lancelot, clarinet; Gilbert Coursier, horn; Paul Hongne, bassoon), 1954; Albert Roussel, Concert pour petit orchestre, op. 34, 1955; André Jolivet, Concerto for flute and string orchestra (Jean-Pierre Rampal, flute), 1960; J.S. Bach, Brandenburg Concerto No. 4 [Georg Friedrich Hendel, violin; Kurt Cromm and Holger Ristenpart, flutes], 1967).
- Charles W. Scheel and Damien Ehrhardt (ed.). Karl Ristenpart und das Saarländische Kammerorchester (1953-1967) = Karl Ristenpart et l’Orchestre de chambre de la Sarre (1953-1967). Bern and New York, Peter Lang (“Convergences” Series; 291 p., 20 illus.), 1999.
- Richard Freed. "Tsar of the Saarland", London, Classic Record Collector, Spring 2006, pp. 10–17.
- Charles W. Scheel (ed.). "Gustav Mahler in the correspondence between Karl Ristenpart and Richard Freed in 1967", special trilingual issue of the Cahiers de l’Amefa, Saarbrücken, 2007. Texts edited and translated in German, French and English by Charles W. Scheel (72 p + CD with a 1959 recording of the Adagietto from Mahlers 5th Symphony, by the Saar Chamber Orchestra under Karl Ristenpart). See under:

https://univ-metz.academia.edu/CharlesScheel/Papers/766156/GUSTAV_MAHLER _in_der_Korrespondenz_in_the_correspondence_dans_la_correspondance
