= Annie d'Arco =

French pianist (1920–1998)

- Born: October 28, 1920; Marseille, France
- Died: March 5, 1998 (aged 77)
- Genres: Classical
- Occupation: Piano

Annie d'Arco (28 October 1920 – 5 March 1998) was a 20th-century French classical pianist.

== Biography ==
Born in Marseille, d'Arco studied the piano with Marguerite Long and won the Geneva competition in 1946. She gave her first concert with the Orchestre Lamoureux, under the direction of Eugène Bigot.

She performed both as a soloist and as a chamber musician, notably with Henryk Szeryng, André Navarra, Jean-Pierre Rampal, Jean-Éric Thirault and Pierre Pierlot. She taught the piano at the École normale de musique de Paris for many years, and had many students with distinguished careers, including Christophe Larrieu, Catherine Joly and Marylin Frascone. She was married to Gilbert Coursier, a French horn player.

D'Arco died in the 2nd arrondissement of Paris at age 77.

== Discography ==
- Emmanuel Chabrier: 10 pièces pittoresques, Habanera; Calliope publisher – CAL. 1828 (1974)
- César Franck, Sylvio Lazzari: Sonatas for violin and piano, with Michel Benedetto; Calliope publisher - CAL. 1814
- Camille Saint-Saëns: Sonatas for cello and piano, with André Navarra, Calliope – CAL. 1818
- Paul Dukas: Variations, interlude & final sur un thème de Rameau; Gabriel Pierné: Variations en ut mineur, Op. 42.; Calliope, CAL.1811
- Marcel Landowski: Piano Concerto No 2, with the orchestre national de l'ORTF conducted by Jean Martinon, Erato (1970)
- Carl Maria Von Weber: Piano Sonata No. 3 in D Minor and No. 4 in E Minor. L'Oiseau-Lyre OL 271 (1964)
- Felix Mendelssohn: Complete Songs Without Words op.19, Op.30, Op.38, Op.53, Op.62, Op.67, Op.85, Op.102 Erato label, Ultimo 2-CD set 3984-25597-2
