= Gilbert Coursier =

French hornist

Gilbert Coursier (born in Cavaillon) was a French horn player.

Coursier studied at the Conservatoire de Paris with Jean Devemy. After winning the Geneva International Music Competition (CIEM), he was named first horn in the orchestra of the Théâtre national of the Opéra-Comique and the orchestra of the Paris Opera. He quickly embarked on an international career.

A member of the Quintette à vent français for 20 years, he participated in about fifty recordings, alongside Georges Barboteu and Pierre Delvescovo, most of them for the French firm Erato.

His most famous recording remains Joseph Haydn's Concerto for Two Horns in E flat with Georges Barboteu and the Jean-François Paillard chamber orchestra. This is the only recording in the phonographic history, as the technical difficulties are so difficult for both horns.

Coursier was married to the pianist Annie d'Arco.
