= Pierlot =

Pierlot (English: /piɛrˈloʊ/, French: [pjɛʁlo]) is a French surname. Notable people with the surname include:

- Hubert Pierlot (1883–1963), Belgian Prime Minister between 1939 and 1945
- Francis Pierlot (1875–1955), American film actor
- Philippe Pierlot (born 1958), Belgian viol player and conductor
- Pierre Pierlot (1921–2007), French classical oboist
