= Georges Barboteu =

French horn player and composer (1924–2006)

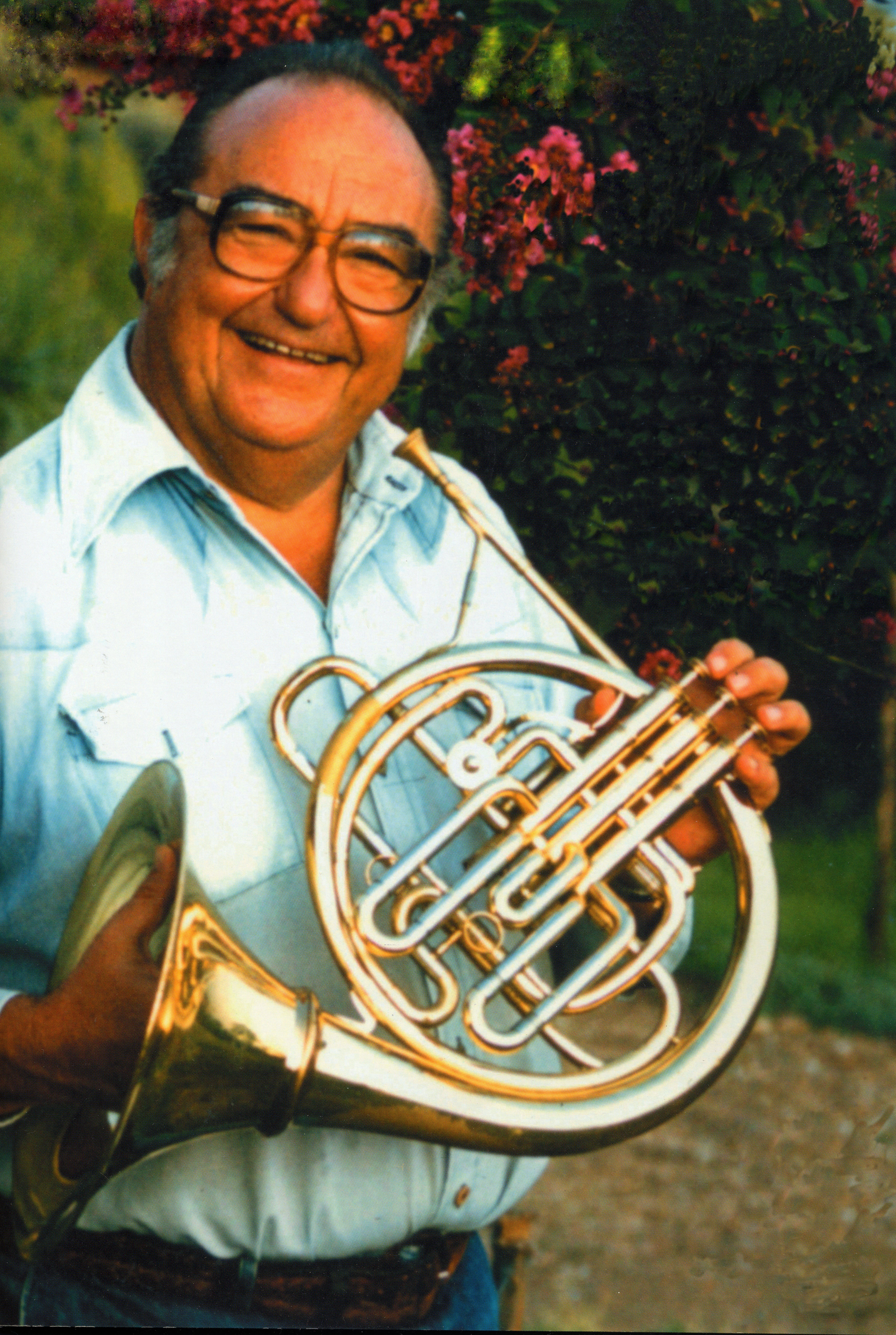
- Georges Barboteu
- Born: 1 April 1924; Algiers
- Died: 30 September 2006 (aged 82); 18th arrondissement of Paris
- Occupations: French horn player and composer

Georges Yves Barboteu (1 April 1924 – 30 September 2006) was a French horn player and composer.

== Biography ==
He was the son of a horn teacher at the Conservatoire d'Alger. He himself started playing the horn at the age of nine, and won First Prize at eleven. He joined the Algiers Radio Symphony Orchestra at the age of fourteen and then the Orchestre national de France in 1948. Barboteu entered the Conservatoire de Paris in 1950, where he received the honorary prize that same year.

In 1951 he won first prize in the Geneva International Music Competition. He was the main horn player of the Orchestre Lamoureux and from 1969 onwards, of the Orchestre de Paris. He taught his instrument at the Conservatoire from 1969 to 1989.

He left an important discography, recording many pages of chamber music and concertante music, from the 17th century to the contemporary era.

Among his landmark recordings are Michael Haydn's horn concerto, Joseph Haydn's double horn concerto and Telemann's D concerto, all recorded with the Jean-François Paillard chamber orchestra.

Worth mentioning is Weber's Concertino for Horn and Orchestra, which combines all the technical difficulties for the horn, recorded with Theodor Guschlbauer.

Most of his recordings were made by the Erato Records label.

Barboteu wrote horn study books, but also composed about forty pieces for horn alone or with other instruments that were often used in Conservatory examinations.
