= 2009 in film =

The following is an overview of events in 2009 in film, including the highest-grossing films, award ceremonies and festivals, a list of films released and notable deaths. Avatar was the year's highest grossing film and became the highest-grossing film of all-time. Also in 2009, the Academy of Motion Picture Arts and Sciences announced that as of that year, their Best Picture category would consist of ten nominees, rather than five (the first time since the 1943 awards).

== Evaluation of the year ==
Film critic Philip French of The Guardian said that 2009:

began with the usual flurry of serious major movies given late December screenings in Los Angeles to qualify for the Oscars. They're now forgotten or vaguely regarded as semi-classics: The Reader, Che, Slumdog Millionaire, Frost/Nixon, Revolutionary Road, The Wrestler, Gran Torino, The Curious Case of Benjamin Button. It soon became apparent that horror movies would be the dominant genre once again, with vampires the pre-eminent sub-species, the most profitable inevitably being New Moon, the latest in Stephenie Meyer's Twilight saga, the best the subtle Swedish Let the Right One In and the worst the British horror spoof Lesbian Vampire Killers. Documentaries continued to flourish, introducing us to fascinating new worlds: Afghan TV talent shows (Afghan Star), Australian exploitation cinema (Not Quite Hollywood), haute couture (The September Issue). Animation thrived, the 3-D comeback threatened to become permanent rather than a gimmick, and the two were conjoined in a dozen 3-D animated features, the finest being DreamWorks Animation's Monsters vs. Aliens and Pixar's Up. Remakes and sequels abounded, none of any merit. The same went for films based on comic strips and graphic novels. British cinema generally bubbled in the doldrums. The well-acted Fish Tank was overrated, as was the dull costume drama The Young Victoria. The best films by native directors were fuelled by our obsession with soccer (Ken Loach's Looking for Eric and Tom Hooper's The Damned United) or directed by foreigners (New Zealander Jane Campion's Bright Star, and two films by Danes: Nicholas Winding Refn's Bronson and Lone Scherfig's An Education). The most original British film was Christine Molloy and Joe Lawlor's low-key, low-budget Helen, a formally innovative look at provincial life. 2009 was a mostly undistinguished year for Hollywood, with indifferent films from Woody Allen (Vicky Cristina Barcelona), Michael Mann (Public Enemies) and others, and deadly blockbusters such as Angels & Demons and 2012. The Coen brothers, however, were on form, examining their midwestern Jewish roots in A Serious Man, and Kathryn Bigelow's The Hurt Locker was the best film yet about Iraq. From Europe we had several striking revisionist accounts of violent resistance to Nazi occupation in the second world war: Flammen & Citronen (Denmark), Max Manus: Man of War (Norway) and The Army of Crime (France). But they were drowned in the tsunami of Quentin Tarantino's lunatic second world war fantasy Inglourious Basterds. The most likable European picture was the Italian Mid-August Lunch, the directorial debut of 60-year-old Gianni Di Gregorio (screenwriter on Gomorrah), and the three most memorably argumentative and provocative were Paolo Sorrentino's Il Divo, Lars von Trier's Antichrist and Michael Haneke's The White Ribbon. The performances I most enjoyed were impersonations: Meryl Streep's Julia Child (Julie & Julia) and Christian McKay's Orson in Me and Orson Welles.

== Highest-grossing films ==
The top 10 films released in 2009 by worldwide gross are as follows:

Highest-grossing films of 2009
Rank	Title	Distributor	Worldwide gross
1	Avatar	20th Century Fox	$2,743,577,587 (Note: Excludes grosses from subsequent re-releases.)
2	Harry Potter and the Half-Blood Prince	Warner Bros.	$933,959,197
3	Ice Age: Dawn of the Dinosaurs	20th Century Fox	$886,686,817
4	Transformers: Revenge of the Fallen	Paramount	$836,303,693
5	2012	Sony	$769,679,473
6	Up	Disney	$735,099,082
7	The Twilight Saga: New Moon	Summit	$709,827,462
8	Sherlock Holmes	Warner Bros.	$524,028,679
9	Angels & Demons	Sony	$485,930,816
10	The Hangover	Warner Bros.	$469,328,079

Avatar surpassed Titanic as the highest-grossing film of all time on January 25, 2010. Avatar then became the first film to earn more than $2 billion at the box office on January 31, 2010. Avatar was surpassed by Avengers: Endgame as the highest-grossing film of all time on July 21, 2019. Due to a re-release, Avatar retook the title from Endgame on March 13, 2021.

== Events ==
Month	Day	Event
January	1	Steven Spielberg and DreamWorks Animation sign a licensing agreement to allow DreamWorks Pictures, DWA's former parent company, to use the DreamWorks trademarks, logo and name, after the live-action studio's separation from Paramount Pictures.
January	22	The 81st Academy Awards nominations are announced with The Curious Case of Benjamin Button leading with 13 nominations, followed by Slumdog Millionaire with 10. Both films are nominated for Best Picture. Heath Ledger is posthumously nominated for Best Supporting Actor award for his performance in The Dark Knight, exactly one year after his death.
January	25	The 15th Screen Actors Guild Awards ceremony is held at the Shrine Exposition Center, Los Angeles.
January	25	Annie Awards ceremony is held in the UCLA's Royce Hall, Los Angeles.
January	31	The 61st Directors Guild of America Award dinner is held in the Hyatt Regency Century Plaza, Los Angeles.
February	5 – 15	The 59th Berlin International Film Festival is opened with the world premiere of Tom Tykwer's The International. The Golden Bear prize is awarded to The Milk of Sorrow. The Silver Bears prizes are awarded to Asghar Farhadi, Best Director, Sotigui Kouyaté, Best Actor and Birgit Minichmayr, Best Actress. The festival is closed by the international premiere of George Tillman Jr.'s Notorious
February	7	The 61st Writers Guild of America Awards is held.
February	7	The 62nd BAFTA Awards ceremony is held in the Royal Opera House, London.
February	21	The 29th Golden Raspberry Awards ceremony is held in Hollywood, California.
February	22	The 81st Academy Awards ceremony is held at the Kodak Theatre in Los Angeles.
March	29	The 14th Empire Awards ceremony is held at the Grosvenor House Hotel in London, England.
May	31	The 2009 MTV Movie Awards ceremony was held at the Gibson Amphitheatre in Universal City, California
July	23 – 2 August	The 9th Era New Horizons Film Festival in Wrocław was held
December	18	Avatar is released in theaters, breaking many box-office records, including becoming the highest-grossing movie of all time.

== Awards ==
Category/Organization	15th Critics' Choice Awards January 15, 2010	67th Golden Globe Awards January 17, 2010		Producers, Directors, Screen Actors, and Writers Guild Awards	63rd BAFTA Awards February 21, 2010	82nd Academy Awards March 7, 2010
Category/Organization	15th Critics' Choice Awards January 15, 2010	Drama	Musical or Comedy	Producers, Directors, Screen Actors, and Writers Guild Awards	63rd BAFTA Awards February 21, 2010	82nd Academy Awards March 7, 2010
Best Film	The Hurt Locker	Avatar	The Hangover	The Hurt Locker		
Best Director	Kathryn Bigelow; The Hurt Locker	James Cameron; Avatar		Kathryn Bigelow; The Hurt Locker		
Best Actor	Jeff Bridges; Crazy Heart		Robert Downey Jr. Sherlock Holmes	Jeff Bridges; Crazy Heart	Colin Firth; A Single Man	Jeff Bridges; Crazy Heart
Best Actress	Sandra Bullock; The Blind Side; Meryl Streep; Julie & Julia	Sandra Bullock; The Blind Side	Meryl Streep; Julie & Julia	Sandra Bullock; The Blind Side	Carey Mulligan; An Education	Sandra Bullock; The Blind Side
Best Supporting Actor	Christoph Waltz; Inglourious Basterds					
Best Supporting Actress	Mo'Nique; Precious					
Best Screenplay, Adapted	Jason Reitman and Sheldon Turner; Up in the Air	Jason Reitman and Sheldon Turner; Up in the Air		Jason Reitman and Sheldon Turner; Up in the Air		Geoffrey Fletcher; Precious
Best Screenplay, Original	Quentin Tarantino; Inglourious Basterds	Jason Reitman and Sheldon Turner; Up in the Air		Mark Boal; The Hurt Locker		
Best Animated Film	Up					
Best Original Score	Up; Michael Giacchino			N/A	Up; Michael Giacchino	
Best Original Song	"The Weary Kind"; Crazy Heart			N/A	N/A	"The Weary Kind"; Crazy Heart
Best Foreign Language Film	Broken Embraces	The White Ribbon		N/A	A Prophet	The Secret in Their Eyes
Best Documentary	The Cove	N/A		The Cove	N/A	The Cove

Palme d'Or (62nd Cannes Film Festival):

The White Ribbon (Das weiße Band), directed by Michael Haneke, Germany

Golden Lion (66th Venice International Film Festival):

Lebanon, directed by Samuel Maoz, Israel

Golden Bear (59th Berlin International Film Festival):

The Milk of Sorrow (La Teta Asustada), directed by Claudia Llosa, Peru

People's Choice Award (34th Toronto International Film Festival):

Precious, directed by Lee Daniels, United States

== 2009 films ==
=== By country/region ===
- List of American films of 2009
- List of Argentine films of 2009
- List of Australian films of 2009
- List of Bangladeshi films of 2009
- List of Bengali films of 2009
- List of Bollywood films of 2009
- List of Brazilian films of 2009
- List of British films of 2009
- List of Chinese films of 2009
- List of Canadian films of 2009
- List of French films of 2009
- List of Hindi films of 2009
- List of Hong Kong films of 2009
- List of Italian films of 2009
- List of Japanese films of 2009
- List of Kannada films of 2009
- List of Mexican films of the 2000s
- List of Malayalam films of 2009
- List of Pakistani films of 2009
- List of Russian films of 2009
- List of South Korean films of 2009
- List of Spanish films of 2009
- List of Tamil films of 2009
- List of Telugu films of 2009
- List of Turkish films of 2009

=== By genre/medium ===
- List of action films of 2009
- List of animated feature films of 2009
- List of avant-garde films of 2009
- List of crime films of 2009
- List of comedy films of 2009
- List of drama films of 2009
- List of horror films of 2006
- List of science fiction films of 2009
- List of thriller films of 2009
- List of western films of 2009

== Births ==
- January 5 - Walker Scobell, American actor
- January 23 - Winslow Fegley, American actor
- January 26 - YaYa Gosselin, American actress
- February 22 - Archie Yates, English actor
- March 12 - Woody Norman, English actor
- March 17 - Lenny Rush, English actor
- April 15
  - Isaac Ordonez, American actor
  - Julia Butters, American actress
- April 20 - Calah Lane, American actress and singer
- May 18 - Hala Finley, American actress
- May 25 - Elle Graham, American actress
- June 7 - Diaana Babnicova, British actress
- June 23 - Xia Vigor, British-Filipino actress
- July 2 - Alexa Swinton, American actress
- September 25 - Leah Jeffries, American actress
- September 26 – Alisha Weir, Irish actress and singer
- October 9 - Gordon Cormier, Canadian actor
- November 5 - Trinity Bliss, American actress and singer
- November 10 - Christian Convery, American-Canadian actor
- December 5 - Owen Cooper, English actor
- December 9 - Sōya Kurokawa, Japanese actor

== Deaths ==
Month	Date	Name	Age	Country	Profession	Notable films
January	1	Edmund Purdom	82	UK	Actor	Julius Caesar; The Egyptian
January	2	Steven Gilborn	72	US	Actor	Dunston Checks In; Evolution
January	3	Pat Hingle	84	US	Actor	Batman; Hang 'Em High
January	3	Olga San Juan	81	US	Actress, Dancer	Blue Skies; Are You with It?
January	5	Robert F. Brunner	70	US	Composer	The Computer Wore Tennis Shoes; That Darn Cat!
January	5	Ned Tanen	77	US	Producer, Executive	The Breakfast Club; St. Elmo's Fire
January	6	John Scott Martin	82	UK	Actor	Monty Python's The Meaning of Life; Pink Floyd – The Wall
January	8	Don Galloway	71	US	Actor	The Big Chill; Rough Night in Jericho
January	12	Claude Berri	74	France	Director, Producer, Screenwriter	Jean de Florette; Manon des Sources
January	12	Russ Conway	95	Canada	Actor	What Ever Happened to Baby Jane?; Love Me Tender
January	13	Patrick McGoohan	80	Ireland	Actor	Braveheart; Escape from Alcatraz
January	14	Ricardo Montalbán	88	Mexico	Actor	Fiesta; Star Trek II: The Wrath of Khan
January	14	Angela Morley	84	UK	Composer	Watership Down; The Little Prince
January	15	Chuck Gaspar	70	US	Special Effects Artist	Ghostbusters; Armageddon
January	17	Susanna Foster	84	US	Actress, Singer	Phantom of the Opera; Glamour Boy
January	18	Kathleen Byron	88	UK	Actress	Black Narcissus; Saving Private Ryan
January	21	Charles H. Schneer	88	US	Producer	Jason and the Argonauts; Clash of the Titans
January	26	Darrell Sandeen	78	US	Actor	L.A. Confidential; They Call Me Bruce?
January	31	Clint Ritchie	70	US	Actor	The St. Valentine's Day Massacre; Bandolero!
February	6	Philip Carey	83	US	Actor	Calamity Jane; Pushover
February	6	James Whitmore	87	US	Actor	Planet of the Apes; The Shawshank Redemption
February	7	Molly Bee	69	US	Singer, Actress	Going Steady; Summer Love
February	7	Lesley Brook	91	UK	Actress	The Bells Go Down; For You Alone
February	9	Robert Anderson	91	US	Screenwriter	The Nun's Story; The Sand Pebbles
February	13	Dilys Laye	74	UK	Actress	Idol on Parade; A Countess from Hong Kong
February	19	Oreste Lionello	81	Italy	Actor	Four Flies on Grey Velvet; Totòtruffa 62
February	20	Robert Quarry	83	US	Actor	Count Yorga, Vampire; Dr. Phibes Rises Again
February	21	Howard Zieff	81	US	Director	Private Benjamin; My Girl
February	23	Laurence Payne	89	UK	Actor	Vampire Circus; The Tell-Tale Heart
February	24	Edward Judd	76	UK	Actor	O Lucky Man!; The Day the Earth Caught Fire
February	27	John Alvin	91	US	Actor	Objective, Burma!; The Beast with Five Fingers
March	3	Sydney Chaplin	82	US	Actor	Limelight; Le clan des siciliens
March	4	Horton Foote	92	US	Screenwriter	To Kill a Mockingbird; Tender Mercies
March	7	Tullio Pinelli	100	Italy	Screenwriter	La Strada; La Dolce Vita
March	13	Betsy Blair	85	US	Actress	Marty; A Delicate Balance
March	14	Millard Kaufman	92	US	Screenwriter	Bad Day at Black Rock; Gun Crazy
March	15	Ron Silver	62	US	Actor	Reversal of Fortune; Timecop
March	18	Natasha Richardson	45	UK	Actress	Nell; The Parent Trap
March	21	John Cater	77	UK	Actor	The Abominable Dr. Phibes; Captain Kronos – Vampire Hunter
March	21	John Franklyn-Robbins	84	UK	Actor	Vanity Fair; The Plague Dogs
March	25	Steven Bach	70	US	Studio Executive	
March	29	Monte Hale	89	US	Actor, Singer	Home on the Range; Giant
March	29	Maurice Jarre	84	France	Composer	Lawrence of Arabia; Doctor Zhivago
April	1	Lou Perryman	67	US	Actor	The Texas Chainsaw Massacre 2; Poltergeist
April	1	Miguel Ángel Suárez	69	Puerto Rico	Actor	Bananas; Stir Crazy
April	3	Tom Smith	88	UK	Makeup Artist	Gandhi; Raiders of the Lost Ark
April	4	Jody McCrea	74	US	Actor	Beach Blanket Bingo; Cry Blood, Apache
April	5	Wouter Barendrecht	43	Netherlands	Producer	The Goddess of 1967; Springtime in a Small Town
April	8	Jane Bryan	90	US	Actress	Each Dawn I Die; Kid Galahad
April	9	Michael N. Harbour	63	UK	Actor	Sophie's World; Wild Geese II
April	9	Shakti Samanta	83	India	Director, Producer	Aradhana; Kati Patang
April	11	Simon Channing Williams	63	UK	Producer	Secrets & Lies; Topsy-Turvy
April	12	Marilyn Chambers	57	US	Actress	Rabid; Behind the Green Door
April	18	Peter Dennis	75	UK	Actor	Sideways; Shrek
April	22	Ken Annakin	94	UK	Director	Swiss Family Robinson; The Longest Day
April	22	Jack Cardiff	94	UK	Cinematographer, Director	Black Narcissus; The Red Shoes
April	25	Bea Arthur	86	US	Actress	Lovers and Other Strangers; Mame
April	27	Feroz Khan	69	India	Actor	Tarzan Goes to India; Dharmatma
May	1	Marc Rocco	46	US	Director, Screenwriter	Where the Day Takes You; Murder in the First
May	4	Dom DeLuise	75	US	Actor	The Cannonball Run; Silent Movie
May	4	Jane Randolph	93	US	Actress	Railroaded!; Cat People
May	15	Bud Tingwell	86	Australia	Actor	Ned Kelly; The Dish
May	18	Wayne Allwine	62	US	Voice Actor	Who Framed Roger Rabbit; Fantasia 2000
May	20	Lucy Gordon	28	UK	Actress	Perfume; Spider-Man 3
May	28	Mort Abrahams	93	US	Producer	Planet of the Apes; Goodbye, Mr. Chips
May	28	Terence Alexander	86	UK	Actor	The Square Peg; Waterloo
June	3	David Carradine	72	US	Actor	Kill Bill; Bound for Glory
June	3	Shih Kien	96	China	Actor	The Young Master; Enter the Dragon
June	6	Mary Howard	96	US	Actress	Abe Lincoln in Illinois; Billy the Kid
June	9	Michael Roof	32	US	Actor	XXX; Black Hawk Down
June	21	Lorena Gale	51	Canada	Actress	The Butterfly Effect; Fantastic Four
June	23	Ed McMahon	86	US	Actor	The Incident; Fun with Dick and Jane
June	25	Farrah Fawcett	62	US	Actress	Logan's Run; The Cannonball Run
June	25	Michael Jackson	50	US	Singer, Actor	The Wiz; Moonwalker
June	27	Gale Storm	87	US	Singer, Actress	It Happened on 5th Avenue; The Texas Rangers
June	29	Jan Rubeš	89	Czech Republic	Singer, Actor	Witness; Snow Falling on Cedars
June	30	Harve Presnell	75	US	Actor, Singer	The Unsinkable Molly Brown; Fargo
July	1	Karl Malden	97	US	Actor	A Streetcar Named Desire; On the Waterfront
July	4	Brenda Joyce	92	US	Actress	Tarzan and the Amazons; The Rains Came
July	10	Zena Marshall	83	UK	Actress	Dr. No; Those Magnificent Men in their Flying Machines
July	13	Beverly Roberts	95	US	Actress	China Clipper; Two Against the World
July	14	Dal McKennon	89	US	Actor	The Birds; Mary Poppins
July	24	Harry Towb	83	Ireland	Actor	Barry Lyndon; Patton
July	26	Clayton Hill	78	US	Actor	Dawn of the Dead; The Fish That Saved Pittsburgh
July	29	Joanne Jordan	88	US	Actress	Written on the Wind; Jet Pilot
July	31	Jean-Paul Roussillon	78	France	Actor	Monsieur de Pourceaugnac; Revenge of the Musketeers
August	4	Blake Snyder	51	US	Screenwriter	Stop! Or My Mom Will Shoot; Blank Check
August	5	Budd Schulberg	95	US	Screenwriter	On the Waterfront; A Face in the Crowd
August	6	John Hughes	59	US	Director, Screenwriter, Producer	The Breakfast Club; Home Alone
August	9	John Quade	71	US	Actor	The Outlaw Josey Wales; High Plains Drifter
August	12	Ruth Ford	98	US	Actress	Adventure in Iraq; Play It As It Lays
August	13	John Bentley	92	UK	Actor	Calling Paul Temple; Hammer the Toff
August	15	Carlos Gómez	92	Paraguay	Actor	Alto Paraná; La sangre y la semilla
August	16	Richard Moore	83	US	Cinematographer, Director	Annie; Sometimes a Great Notion
August	21	Gordon Daniel	86	UK	Sound Engineer	Platoon; Grand Prix
August	26	Sadie Corré	91	UK	Actress, Dancer	Return of the Jedi; Brazil
August	26	Dominick Dunne	83	US	Producer	The Boys in the Band; Ash Wednesday
August	28	Wayne Tippit	76	US	Actor	Nurse Betty; JFK
September	3	Caro Jones	86	Canada	Casting Director	Rocky; The Karate Kid
September	4	Iain Cuthbertson	79	UK	Actor	Gorillas in the Mist; Strictly Sinatra
September	4	Carl Reindel	74	US	Actor	Bullitt; Tora! Tora! Tora!
September	7	Frank Coghlan, Jr.	93	US	Actor	The Public Enemy; Adventures of Captain Marvel
September	8	Ray Barrett	82	Australia	Actor	Australia; The Sundowners
September	11	Zakes Mokae	75	South Africa	Actor	The Serpent and the Rainbow; Waterworld
September	12	Larry Gelbart	81	US	Screenwriter	Tootsie; Oh, God!
September	13	Paul Burke	83	US	Actor	The Thomas Crown Affair; Valley of the Dolls
September	13	Arnold Laven	87	US	Director	Rough Night in Jericho; Sam Whiskey
September	14	Henry Gibson	73	US	Actor	Nashville; Magnolia
September	14	Patrick Swayze	57	US	Actor	Dirty Dancing; Ghost
September	15	Troy Kennedy Martin	77	UK	Screenwriter	The Italian Job; Kelly's Heroes
September	16	Timothy Bateson	83	UK	Actor	Labyrinth; Oliver Twist
September	16	Luciano Emmer	91	Italy	Director, Screenwriter	Sunday in August; Three Girls from Rome
September	17	Dick Durock	72	US	Actor, Stuntman	Swamp Thing; Stand by Me
September	18	Pearl Hackney	92	UK	Actress	Yanks; There's a Girl in My Soup
September	20	John Hart	91	US	Actor	Blackenstein; The Legend of the Lone Ranger
September	20	Katherine Parr	88	UK	Actress	This Sporting Life; Doomwatch
September	21	Robert Ginty	60	US	Actor, Director	The Exterminator; Coming Home
September	30	Robert S. Baker	92	UK	Producer, Director, Cinematographer	Jack the Ripper; The Hellfire Club
October	3	John Peverall	77-78	UK	Producer	The Deer Hunter; The Man Who Fell to Earth
October	6	Pamela Blake	94	US	Actress	Wyoming Outlaw; Mr. & Mrs. Smith
October	10	Sean Lawlor	55	Ireland	Actor	Trojan Eddie; Braveheart
October	13	Al Martino	82	US	Actor, Singer	The Godfather; The Godfather Part III
October	13	Daniel Melnick	77	US	Producer, Executive	Altered States; Footloose
October	14	Lou Albano	76	Italy	Actor, Wrestler	Stay Tuned; Wise Guys
October	14	Collin Wilcox	74	US	Actress	To Kill a Mockingbird; Jaws 2
October	17	Douglas Blackwell	85	UK	Actor	Robin Hood: Prince of Thieves; Labyrinth
October	17	Vic Mizzy	93	US	Composer	The Night Walker; The Spirit Is Willing
October	17	Rosanna Schiaffino	69	Italy	Actress	The Victors; Drop Dead Darling
October	19	Joseph Wiseman	91	Canada	Actor	Dr. No; Detective Story
October	20	Hubert Rees	81	UK	Actor	Under Milk Wood; Sweeney 2
October	23	Lou Jacobi	95	Canada	Actor	My Favorite Year; Irma la Douce
October	26	Yoshirō Muraki	85	Japan	Production Designer, Costume Designer	Yojimbo; Throne of Blood
October	27	John David Carson	57	US	Actor	The Day of the Dolphin; Pretty Maids All in a Row
November	4	David Tree	94	UK	Actor	Goodbye, Mr. Chips; Pygmalion
November	6	Derek Brechin	57	UK	Film Editor	Stargate; Deep Blue Sea
November	12	Paul Wendkos	84	US	Director	Gidget; The Mephisto Waltz
November	16	Edward Woodward	79	UK	Actor	Breaker Morant; The Wicker Man
November	17	Tony Kendall	72	Italy	Actor	Machine Gun McCain; Kommissar X
November	28	Gilles Carle	81	Canada	Director, Screenwriter	The Plouffe Family; The True Nature of Bernadette
December	3	Nat Boxer	84	US	Sound Engineer	The Godfather Part II; Apocalypse Now
December	3	Richard Todd	90	Ireland	Actor	The Hasty Heart; Stage Fright
December	4	Bryan O'Byrne	78	US	Actor	Gunfight in Abilene; Spaceballs
December	5	Garfield Morgan	78	UK	Actor	The Odessa File; 28 Weeks Later
December	8	Joan Bridge	97	UK	Costume Designer	The Day of the Jackal; Fiddler on the Roof
December	9	Gene Barry	90	US	Actor	The War of the Worlds; Thunder Road
December	12	Val Avery	85	US	Actor	The Magnificent Seven; Requiem for a Heavyweight
December	15	Peter Murton	85	UK	Production Designer, Art Director	Dr. Strangelove; Stargate
December	15	Robert Turturice	60	US	Costume Designer	Batman and Robin; Turbulence
December	16	Roy E. Disney	79	US	Studio Executive	
December	17	Alaina Reed Hall	63	US	Actress	Cruel Intentions; Death Becomes Her
December	17	Jennifer Jones	90	US	Actress	The Song of Bernadette; Duel in the Sun
December	17	Dan O'Bannon	63	US	Screenwriter, Director, Actor	Alien; The Return of the Living Dead
December	19	Donald Pickering	76	UK	Actor	The Man Who Knew Too Little; A Bridge Too Far
December	20	Brittany Murphy	32	US	Actress	Clueless; 8 Mile
December	20	Shari Rhodes	71	US	Casting Director	Close Encounters of the Third Kind; The Sandlot
December	20	Arnold Stang	91	US	Actor	The Man with the Golden Arm; Skidoo
December	21	Marianne Stone	87	UK	Actress	Lolita; A Hard Day's Night
December	22	Michael Currie	81	US	Actor	Sudden Impact; Halloween III: Season of the Witch
December	24	Giulio Bosetti	78	Italy	Actor	Il Divo; Good Morning, Night
December	30	Perry Wilson	93	US	Actress	The Matchmaker; Fear Strikes Out
December	31	Glauco Onorato	73	Italy	Actor	Sunflower; La Cage aux Folles II

== Film debuts ==
- Maisa Abd Elhadi – The Time That Remains
- Alberto Ammann − Cell 211
- François Arnaud – I Killed My Mother
- Sharlto Copley – District 9
- Jai Courtney – Stone Bros.
- Belén Cuesta – Hierro
- Laetitia Dosch – Accomplices
- Jacqueline Fernandez – Aladin
- Gal Gadot – Fast & Furious
- Donald Glover – Mystery Team
- Chris Hemsworth – Star Trek
- Liam Hemsworth – Knowing
- Vincent Lacoste – The French Kissers
- Billy Magnussen – Happy Tears
- Aubrey Plaza – Mystery Team
- Zachary Quinto – Star Trek
- Chris Riggi – Toe to Toe
- Kaya Scodelario – Moon
- Dan Stevens – Hilde
- Taylor Swift - Hannah Montana: The Movie
- David Verdaguer – Three Days With the Family
