= Christophe Larrieu =

French classicial pianist and music conductor

Christophe Larrieu is a French classical pianist and music conductor.

A pupil of Annie d'Arco and Lucette Descaves, first prize for piano, accompaniment and vocal conductor at the Conservatoire de Paris, Larrieu also studied conducting.

While working as a vocal conductor on numerous lyrical productions, he regularly accompanies singers and instrumentalists in France and abroad.

An eclectic musician, he is also known, within the framework of the ensemble "Sorties d'Artistes" for his performances in salon and genre music as in jazz.

In 1999, he conducted a concert of his arrangements at the Halle aux Grains de Toulouse as part of the services provided by the Orchestre national du Capitole de Toulouse.

Since 1997 he has been deputy conductor at the Théâtre du Capitole de Toulouse where he directed in particular La mascotte, La Fille de madame Angot, Les Mousquetaires au couvent, La Périchole, as well as Benjamin Britten's The Little Sweep and Noye's Fludde, initiation operas for children.
