= Holiday Inn Records =

American record label

Holiday Inn
- Parent company: Holiday Inn
- Founded: 1961
- Founder: D. Wayne Foster
- Defunct: 1969
- Status: Defunct
- Distributor: Various
- Genre: Various
- Country of origin: United States
- Location: Nashville, Tennessee

Holiday Inn Records was an American record label founded by Wayne Foster in 1961. It was initially intended as a creative outlet for Foster and Kemmons Wilson, as an independent business venture. Foster ran the label between 1961 and 1963. Sam Phillips of Sun later ran the label on behalf of Wilson.

== History ==
In 1961, D. Wayne Foster discovered a musical group named the Roller Coasters. Foster brought the group to the Owen Bradley's Studio in Nashville, Tennessee to record. The group recorded two songs, "Rim Shot, Part 1" and "Rim Shot, Part 2". Foster created Holiday Inn Records to distribute the single.

Holiday Inn Records recorded a number of acts that Foster discovered, and in most cases was involved in the recording sessions, assisted by Neal Matthews Jr. of the Jordanaires. Notable artists signed in the first year include Jimmy Foster, Frank Starr, Kenny Lund, Rusty Curry, Buck Griffin, Stan Daniel, and Tookie Collom.

By 1963, Foster was devoting only a small amount of time to devote to producing records for the label, as he had many other, more profitable business ventures. After producing eleven more records, Foster decided to leave Holiday Inn. This left Wilson needing to find someone to run Holiday Inn Records. He asked his old friend, Sam Phillips, of Sun Records. Since Phillips had invested in the Holiday Inn hotel chain earlier, he later recorded other artists on the Holiday Inn record label for Wilson.

The label's first rock-and-roll single was "Love" by Greg Todd and the Jacks, released in 1968. The first full-length album, also released in 1968, contained 12 songs by Dolly Holiday. Phillips also recorded songs by recording artists including Charlie Feathers, Diane Hall, Lee Adkins, Jerry Dyke, The Climates, Ironing Board Sam, Portrait of Fun, Robert and Randy, Larry Brinkley, Larry and The Accommodations, Gary Ellison, Charlie Freeman, Charlie's Children and Load of Mischief.
