= Jacques Lancelot =

French classical clarinetist (1920–2009)

Jacques Lancelot (English: /lænsəˈloʊ/ lan-sə-LOH, French: [ʒak lɑ̃slo]; 24 April 1920 – 7 February 2009) was a French classical clarinetist.

== Biography ==
Born in Rouen, France, he studied at the conservatoire of Caen with Fernand Blachet, and at the Conservatoire de Paris with Auguste Périer and Fernand Oubradous, where he graduated in 1939. He is considered an exponent of the traditional French clarinet school with a clear and transparent sound.

For many years he was professor of clarinet at the conservatoire of Rouen, as well as at the Conservatoire National Supérieur de Musique de Lyon and at the "l'Académie Internationale de Nice". Frequently he served as juror in the Geneva International Music Competition and the Conservatoire de Paris. He was a solo performer at the famous Concerts Lamoureux and the Garde Républicaine, as well as a member of the "Quintette á vent Français", with:

- Jean-Pierre Rampal, flute
- Pierre Pierlot, oboe
- Gilbert Coursier, horn
- Paul Hongne, bassoon.

He gave the first performance of the famously difficult clarinet concerto by Jean Françaix of which, in 1976, in his book "Clarinet", Jack Brymer wrote:

"A work for the future, possibly, when the instrument has developed further or the human hand has changed. At present, its roulades in the key of B major are beyond almost any player; but the work is a worthwhile challenge, and the A-clarinet would probably provide the answer."

Additionally, he gave the premieres of works by Jean Rivier, Roger Calmel, Bernard Beugnot and others.

A clarinet competition bears its name: "Jacques Lancelot International Clarinet Competition". Lancelot also worked with Buffet to develop their Festival clarinet model.

He has a considerable discography on Erato and King Records.

== Honours ==
He was named an honorary member of the International Clarinet Association.

== Bibliography ==
- Arrignon, Michel; Crousier, Claude; Lancelot, Jacques (1991). 10 ans avec la clarinette (in French). Paris: Institut de pédagogie musicale et chorégraphique. ISBN 2-906460-20-6.
