= Jean-François Paillard =

French conductor (1928–2013)

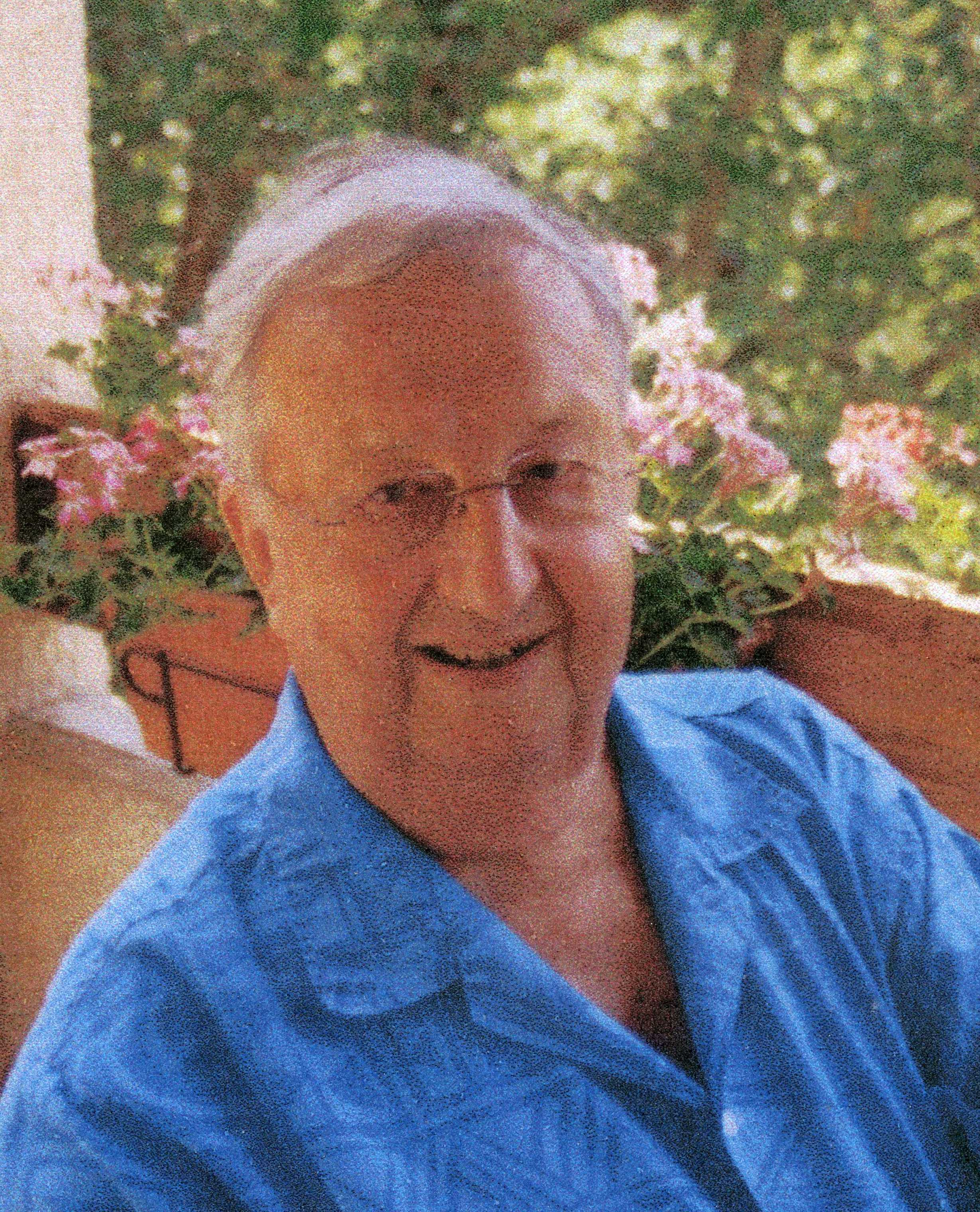

Jean-François Paillard (12 April 1928 – 15 April 2013) was a French conductor.

He was born in Vitry-le-François and received his musical training at the Conservatoire de Paris, where he won first prize in music history, and the Salzburg Mozarteum.

He also earned a degree in mathematics at the Sorbonne.

In 1953, he founded the Jean-Marie Leclair Instrumental Ensemble, which in 1959 became the Orchestre de Chambre Jean-François Paillard. The ensemble has made recordings of much of the Baroque repertoire for Erato Records and has toured throughout Europe and the United States. It has also recorded with many leading French instrumentalists, including Maurice André, Jean-Pierre Rampal, Pierre Pierlot, Lily Laskine, Jacques Lancelot, Michel Arrignon.

A 1968 recording by the orchestra of the "Canon and Gigue for 3 violins and basso continuo" by Johann Pachelbel, familiarly known as Pachelbel's Canon, nearly single-handedly brought the piece from obscurity to great renown. The recording was done in a more Romantic style, at a significantly slower tempo than it had been played at before, and contained obligato parts, written by Paillard, that are now closely associated with the piece. It was released on an Erato Records album, and was also included on a widely distributed album by mail-order label Musical Heritage Society album in 1968. The recording began to get significant attention in the United States, particularly in San Francisco, during the early 1970s. By the late 1970s various renditions of it were topping classical music charts in the U.S., including Paillard's own. The Paillard Chamber Orchestra's recording was also prominently featured in the soundtrack of the 1980 film Ordinary People.

Paillard released 307 records.

He also appeared frequently as a guest conductor with other orchestras and was active as an author. He edited the series Archives de la Musique Instrumentale and published La musique française classique in 1960.

He died on 15 April 2013, three days after his 85th birthday.

== Discography ==
=== Charted albums ===
List of charted albums, with selected details and chart positions
Title	Details	Peak chart positions
Title	Details	AUS
Pachelbel/Canon Leclair/violin concertosCharpentier/Sonate à huitAlbinoni/Adagio	Released: 1984; Label: Erato; Formats: CD, LP	56
