= Stephen Heller =

Hungarian pianist, teacher, and composer

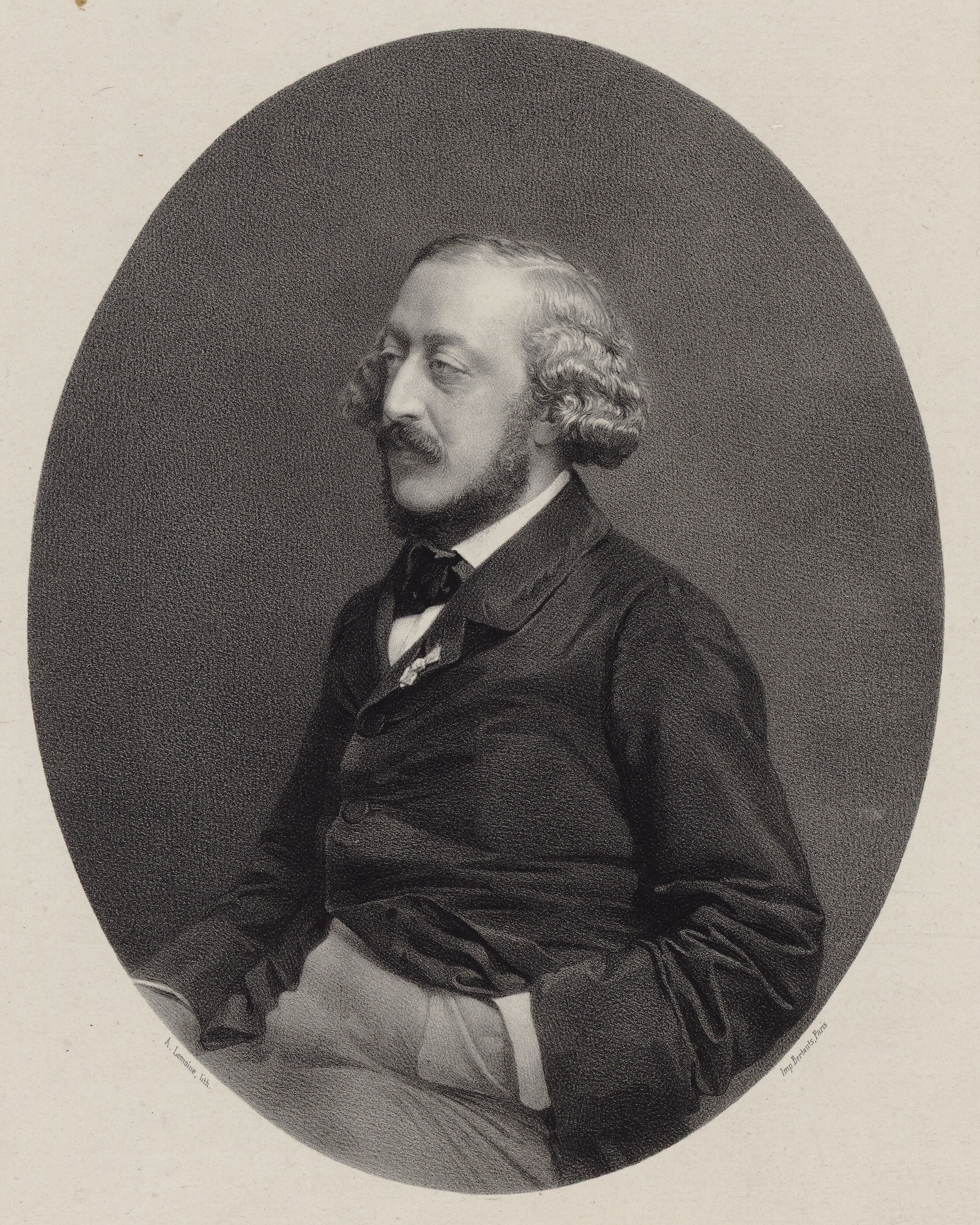
Stephen Heller by Alfred Lemoine.

Stephen Heller (15 May 1813 – 14 January 1888) was a Hungarian pianist, teacher, and composer whose career spanned the period from Schumann to Bizet. Heller was an influence for later Romantic composers. He outlived his reputation, and was a near-forgotten figure at his death in 1888.

== Biography ==
Heller was born in Pest, Hungary in 1813, to a Jewish family. He had been destined for a legal career, but instead decided to devote his life to music. At the age of nine he performed Jan Ladislav Dussek's Concerto for Two Pianos with his teacher, Franz Brauer, at the Budapest Theater. He played so well that he was sent to study in Vienna, Austria, under Carl Czerny. Unable to afford Czerny's expensive fees, he became a student of Anton Halm. After a success in his first public concert in Vienna at the age of 15, his father undertook a concert tour through Hungary, Poland and Germany.

Heller returned to Budapest by way of Kassel, Frankfurt, Nuremberg, Hamburg, and Augsburg. After passing the winter of 1829 at Hamburg, he was taken ill at Augsburg in the summer of 1830. He abandoned the tour there and was soon afterwards adopted by a wealthy patron of music.

At the age of 25, he travelled to Paris, where he became closely acquainted with Hector Berlioz, Frédéric Chopin, Franz Liszt and other composers of his era. Here Heller achieved distinction both as a concert performer and as a teacher. He taught piano to Isidor Philipp, who later became head of the piano department of the Conservatoire de Paris.

In 1849 Heller performed in England, where in 1850 he was the subject of a long serial article (that is divided between many issues) devoted to his music in the British Musical World. In 1862 he performed Mozart's E-flat concerto for two pianos with Charles Hallé at The Crystal Palace.

He spent the last twenty-five years of his life in Paris.

== Works ==
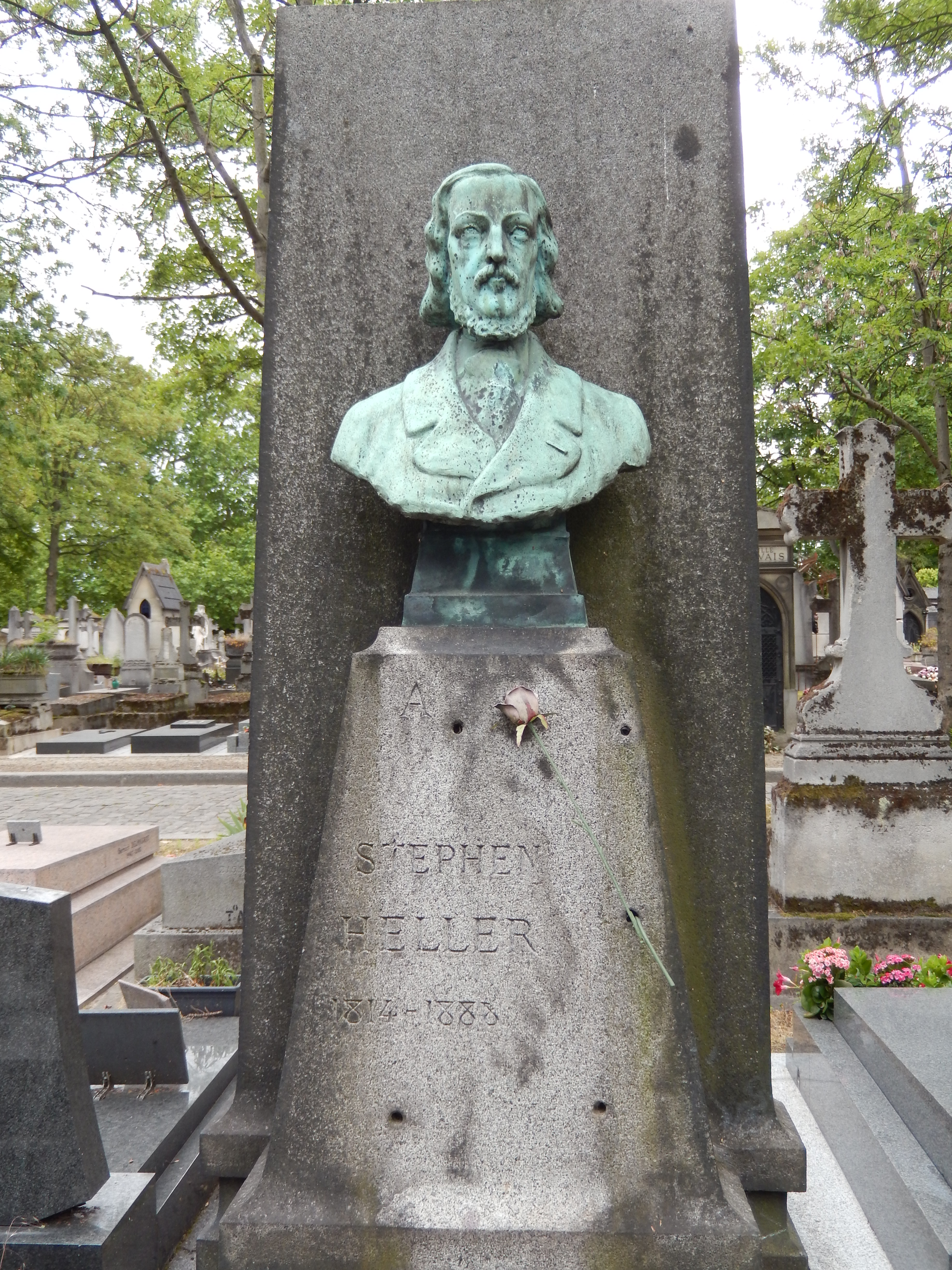
Heller's grave (Père Lachaise Cemetery)

Heller was a prolific composer for the piano and his studies remain popular with music teachers and students.

=== Complete worklist ===
- Op. 1 Thème de Paganini varié
- Op. 2 Les charmes de Hambourg. Rondeau brillant
- Op. 3 Fantaisie dramatique sur les opéras Semiramide et Masaniello
- Op. 4 Valse Favorite de Hubovsky. Variations brillantes
- Op. 5 Thème polonais. Variations brillantes
- Op. 6 Zampa. Variations brillantes sur l'opéra de Herold
- Op. 7 Trois Impromptus
  1. Déclaration
  2. Adieu
  3. Amour sans repos
- Op. 8 Scherzo No. 1 (Rondo-Scherzo)
- Op. 9 Sonata No. 1 in D minor
- Op. 10 Trois morceaux brillants
  1. Divertissement L'elisire d'amore
  2. Rondoletto Norma
  3. Rondoletto L'elisire d'amore
- Op. 11 Rondo-Valse
- Op. 12 Rondoletto sur La Cracovienne du ballet The Gipsy
- Op. 13 Les treize. Divertissement brillant sur l'opéra de Halévy
- Op. 14 Passetemps. Six rondinos sur des mélodies de Strauss
- Op. 15 Les treize. Rondo sur l'opéra de Halévy
- Op. 16 24 Etudes. L'Art de phraser
- Op. 17 Le shérif. Six caprices sur une romance de l'opéra de Halévy
- Op. 18 La chanson du pays. Improvisata sur une mélodie de Reber
- Op. 19 La captive. Deux caprices sur une mélodie de Reber
- Op. 20 Hai Luli. Deux impromptus sur une mélodie de Reber
- Op. 21 Bergeronnette. Deux impromptus sur une mélodie de Reber
- Op. 22 La Favorita. 4 rondos sur l'opéra de Donizetti
- Op. 23 Le guitarrero. Quatre rondos sur l'opéra de Halévy
- Op. 24 Scherzo No. 2
- Op. 25 Richard, Cœur de lion. Étude mélodique sur l'opéra de Gretry
- Op. 26 Richard, Cœur de lion. Impromptu sur l'opéra de Gretry
- Op. 27 Caprice brillant in E♭ major
- Op. 28 Caprice symphonique in A major
- Op. 29 La chasse. Étude
- Op. 30 Dix pensées fugitives for Violin and Piano (collaboration with H.W. Ernst)
  1. Passé
  2. Souvenir
  3. Romance
  4. Lied
  5. Agitato
  6. Adieu
  7. Rêverie
  8. Caprice
  9. Inquiétude
  10. Intermezzo
- Op. 30a ditto, for Piano Solo
- Op. 31 La Juive. Petite fantaisie sur l'opéra de Halévy
- Op. 32 La Juive. Bolero sur un motif de l'opéra de Halévy
- Op. 33 La Truite (Die Forelle) Caprice brillant, mélodie de Schubert
- Op. 34 Le roi des aulnes (Erlkönig) Mélodie de Schubert
- Op. 35 La poste. Improvisata. Mélodie de Schubert
- Op. 36 L'éloge des larmes (Lob der Tränen). Morceau de salon, mélodie de Schubert
- Op. 37 Charles VI. Fantaisie sur l'opéra de Halévy
- Op. 38 Charles VI. Caprice brillant sur l'opéra de Halévy
- Op. 39 La kermesse. Danse Néerlandaise
- Op. 40 Miscellanées
  1. Rêverie
  2. La petite mendiante
  3. Eglogue
- Op. 41 Le déserteur. Caprice sur un motif de l'opéra de Monsigny
- Op. 42 Valse élégante [brillante]
- Op. 43 Valse sentimentale
- Op. 44 Valse villageoise
- Op. 45 25 Études. Introduction à l'art du phrasé
- Op. 46 30 Études mélodiques et progressives
- Op. 47 25 Études pour former au sentiment du rhythme et à l'expression
- Op. 48 No. 1 Charles VI. Chant national de l'opéra de Halévy
- Op. 48 No. 2 Sylvana. Une pastorale
- Op. 49 Quatre arabesques
- Op. 50 Scènes pastorales
- Op. 51 Le désert. Caprice brillant sur l'ode-symphonie de Félicien David [Capricce brillante sur la Marche de la Caravane et la Rêverie du 'Désert' de Félicien David]
- Op. 52 Venitienne
- Op. 53 Tarantella No. 1
- Op. 54 Fantaisie-Stück [Grande Fantaisie auf Lieder von Schubert]
- Op. 55 La fontaine. Caprice brillant, mélodie de Schubert
- Op. 55a Mélodie de Schubert. Transcription of Liebesbotschaft
- Op. 55b Trois mélodies de Schubert
- Op. 56 Sérénade
- Op. 57 Scherzo No. 3 (Scherzo fantastique)
- Op. 58 Rêveries
- Op. 59 Valse brillante
- Op. 60 Canzonetta No. 1
- Op. 61 Tarantella No. 2
- Op. 62 2 Waltzes
  1. D♭ major
  2. A♭ major
- Op. 63 Capriccio
- Op. 64 Humoresque (Presto capriccioso)
- Op. 65 Sonata No. 2 in B minor
- Op. 66 La val d'Andorre . Caprice brillant sur l'opéra de Halévy
- Op. 67 On Wings of Song (Auf Flügeln des Gesanges)[La vallée d'amour]. Improvisata sur la mélodie de Mendelssohn
- Op. 68 Stänchen (Hark! Hark! The lark). Caprice brillant, sérénade de Schubert
- Op. 69 Fantaisie-Sonate on Mendelssohn's Volkslied (Es ist bestimmt in Gottes Rath)
- Op. 70 Le Prophète. Caprice brillant sur l'opéra de Meyerbeer
- Op. 71 Aux mânes de Frédéric Chopin. Élégie et Marche
- Op. 72 3 Mélodies de Mendelssohn
  1. Chant du matin
  2. Chant du troubadour (Minnelied)
  3. Chant du dimanche
- Op. 73 [Three Pieces]
  1. Le chant du chasseur
  2. L'adieu du soldat
  3. Berceuse
- Op. 74 No. 1 L'enfant prodigue. Fantaisie sur l'opéra d'Auber
- Op. 74 No. 2 L'enfant prodigue. Valse brillante sur l'opéra d'Auber
- Op. 75 No. 1 La dame de pique. Rondeau-caprice sur l'opéra de Halévy
- Op. 75 No. 2 La dame de pique. Romance variée sur l'opéra de Halévy
- Op. 76 Caprice caractéristique sur des thèmes de l'operette de Mendelssohn Die Heimkehr aus der Fremde
- Op. 77 Saltarello sur un thème de la quatrième symphonie de Mendelssohn
- Op. 78 Promenades d'un solitaire I. 6 morceaux caratéristiques
- Op. 79 Traumbilder. 6 Pieces
- Op. 80 Promenades d'un solitaire II (Wanderstunden) (Rêveries d'artiste). 6 Pieces
- Op. 81 24 Preludes
- Op. 82 Nuits blanches (Restless Nights). 18 morceaux lyriques
- Op. 83 Feuillets d'album. Six morceaux
- Op. 84 Impromptu
- Op. 85 2 Tarantellas (Nos. 3 & 4)
- Op. 86 Dans les bois I (Im Walde). 7 Rêveries
- Op. 87 Tarentella No. 5
- Op. 88 Sonata No. 3 in C major
- Op. 89 Promenades d'un solitaire III (In Wald und Flur). 6 Pieces
- Op. 90 24 nouvelles Études
- Op. 91 3 Nocturnes
- Op. 92 3 Eglogues
- Op. 93 2 Waltzes
- Op. 94 Tableau de genre
- Op. 95 Allegro pastorale
- Op. 96 Grand étude de concert
- Op. 97 12 Ländler et Valses
- Op. 98 Improvisata sur une mélodie de R. Schumann (Flutenreicher Ebro)
- Op. 99 4 Fantaisie-Stücke
- Op. 100 Canzonetta No. 2
- Op. 101 Rêveries du promeneur solitaire
- Op. 102 Morceau de chasse
- Op. 103 Nocturne in G major
- Op. 104 Polonaise in E♭ major
- Op. 105 3 Songs without Words
- Op. 106 3 Bergeries
- Op. 107 4 Ländler
- Op. 108 Scherzo No. 4
- Op. 109 Feuilles d'automne (Herbstblätter) 2 Pieces
- Op. 110 Une grande feuille et une petite (pour un album)
- Op. 111 Morceaux de Ballet
  1. Pas Noble - Intermède
  2. Pantomime - Couplets dansés
- Op. 112 Caprice humoristique
- Op. 113 Fantaisie-caprice
- Op. 114 Deux cahiers
  1. Préludes et Scènes d'enfants
  2. Presto Scherzoso
- Op. 115 3 Ballades
- Op. 116 2 Études
- Op. 117 3 Preludes
- Op. 118 Variétés. 3 morceaux
  1. Boutard
  2. Feuillet d'album
  3. Air de ballet
- Op. 119 32 Preludes (à Mademoiselle Lili)
- Op. 120 7 Songs without Words
- Op. 121 3 Morceaux
  1. Ballade
  2. Conte
  3. Rêverie du gondolier
- Op. 122 Valses-rêveries
- Op. 123 Feuilles volantes
- Op. 124 Scènes d'Enfants
- Op. 125 24 Nouvelles études d'expression et de rhythme
- Op. 126 3 Overtures
  1. Pour un drame
  2. Pour une pastorale
  3. Pour un opéra comique
- Op. 127 4 Études d'après Der Freischütz de Weber
- Op. 128 Dans les bois II. 7 Pieces
- Op. 129 2 Impromptus
- Op. 130 33 Variations on a theme of Beethoven
- Op. 131 3 Nocturnes (Ständchen)
- Op. 132 2 Polonaises
- Op. 133 21 Variations on a theme of Beethoven
- Op. 134 Petit album. 6 Pieces
- Op. 135 2 Intermèdes de concert
- Op. 136 Dans les bois III. 6 pieces
- Op. 137 2 Tarantellas (Nos. 6 & 7)
- Op. 138 Album dédié à la jeunesse. 25 Pieces in 4 books
- Op. 139 3 Études
- Op. 140 Voyage autour de ma chambre. 5 Pieces
- Op. 141 4 Barcarolles
- Op. 142 Variations on a theme of Schumann
- Op. 143 Sonata No. 4 in B♭ minor
- Op. 144 Caprices sur des thèmes de Mendelssohn
- Op. 145 Waltz
- Op. 146 Sonatina No. 1 in C major
- Op. 147 Sonatina No. 2 in D major
- Op. 148 4 Mazurkas
- Op. 149 Sonatina No. 3 in D minor
- Op. 150 20 Preludes
- Op. 151 2 Études
- Op. 152 6 Waltzes for piano duet
- Op. 152a ditto, for piano solo
- Op. 153 Tablettes d'un solitaire
- Op. 154 21 Études techniques pour préparer à l'exécution des ouvrages de Fr. Chopin
- Op. 155 Fabliau
- Op. 156 Capriccietto
- Op. 157 3 Feuillets d'album
- Op. 158 Mazurka in B major

==== Works without opus numbers ====
- Eglogue in A
- Esquisse in F
- Prière in C
- Romance de l'opéra La chaste Suzanne
- Serenade in A
- Valse allemande
- Transcriptions of 6 Songs by Mendelssohn
- 30 Songs by Franz Schubert arranged for Piano
  1. Lebewohl
  2. Die Gestirne
  3. Schlummerlied
  4. Der Tod und das Mädchen
  5. Die junge Mutter
  6. Rosamunde
  7. Ständchen
  8. Ave Maria
  9. Das Zügenglöcklein
  10. Auf dem Wasser zu singen
  11. Lob der Tränen
  12. Die junge Nonne
  13. Gretchen am Spinnrad
  14. Die Post
  15. Erlkönig
  16. Der Alpenjäger
  17. Du bist die Ruh
  18. Im Haine
  19. Des Mädchens Klage
  20. Ungeduld
  21. Morgengruss
  22. Abschied
  23. Der Wanderer
  24. Die Forelle
  25. Sei mir gegrüsst
  26. Der Fischer
  27. Lied des Jägers
  28. Das Echo
  29. Drange in die Ferne
  30. Im Dorfe
- 7 Deutsche Lieder, for voice and piano

== Discography ==
- Album dédié à la jeunesse, Op. 138: No. 9 Morton Estrin, piano. Connoisseur Society CSS 4238
- 2 Barcarolles Op. 141 Nos. 1 & 2 Ilona Prunyi, piano. Hungaroton ASIN: B000F6ZIEW
- La chasse. Étude, Op. 29 Catherine Joly, piano. Accord ASIN: B000004CCT
- Dans les bois I, Op. 86 Catherine Joly, piano. Accord ASIN: B000004CCT
- Dans les bois II, Op. 128 Marc Pantillon, piano. Claves ASIN: B000026B99
- Dans les bois III, Op. 136 Marc Pantillon, piano. Claves ASIN: B000026B99
- 25 Études, Op. 45 Jan Vermeulen, piano. Brilliant ASIN: B0009IW8TO
- Étude, Op. 45 No. 16 ("The Mermaid") Allan Schiller, piano. ASV ASIN: B000025QK4
- 30 Études, Op. 46 Jan Vermeulen, piano. Brilliant ASIN: B0009IW8TO
- Étude, Op. 46 No. 7 Julianne Markavitch, piano. Starlight Music AZ ASIN: B00006VXOF
- 25 Études, Op. 47 Jan Vermeulen, piano. Brilliant ASIN: B0009IW8TO
- -- Sergio Marengoni, piano. Koch-Disco (Koch International) ASIN: B0000251NE
- Étude, Op. 47 No. 2 Morton Estrin, piano. Connoisseur Society CSS 4238
- 4 Études d'après Der Freischütz de Weber, Op. 127 Catherine Joly, piano. Accord ASIN: B000004CCT
- 2 Impromptus Op. 129 Ilona Prunyi, piano. Hungaroton ASIN: B000F6ZIEW
- 2 Intermèdes de concert, Op. 135 Ilona Prunyi, piano. Hungaroton ASIN: B000F6ZIEW
- La Truite (Die Forelle) Caprice brillant, mélodie de Schubert, Op. 33 Elena Margolina, piano. Ars Produktion ASIN: B00007LL51
- Le roi des aulnes (Der Erlkönig) Mélodie de Schubert, Op. 34 Elena Margolina, piano. Ars Produktion ASIN: B00007LL51
- 2 Lieder Ulf Bästlein, bass-baritone; Stefan Laux, piano. Audite 97.423
- Mazurka in D♭ Op. 148 No. ? Jean Martin, piano. Arion
- Nocturne in G major, Op. 103 Gerhard Puchelt, piano. Genesis Records GS 1043 [LP]
- 3 Nocturnes (Ständchen), Op. 131 Andreas Meyer-Hermann, piano. CPO ASIN: B00000AEOI
- Nuits blanches Op. 82 Jean Martin, piano. Marco Polo ASIN: B0000045Y9
- 3 Pieces, Op. 121 Ilona Prunyi, piano. Hungaroton ASIN: B000F6ZIEW
- 2 Polonaises Op. 132 Ilona Prunyi, piano. Hungaroton ASIN: B000F6ZIEW
- 24 Preludes, Op. 81 Jean Martin, piano. Marco Polo ASIN: B000024OJG
- -- Andreas Meyer-Hermann, piano. Fsm Adagio ASIN: B000003V5V
- Prelude, Op. 81 No. 2 Catherine Joly, piano. Accord ASIN: B000004CCT
- Prelude, Op. 81 No. 15 Stéphane Reymond, piano. Cantando 9208
- 32 Preludes (à Mademoiselle Lili) Op. 119 Jean Martin, piano. Marco Polo ASIN: B0000045Y9
- 20 Preludes, Op. 150 Jean Martin, piano. Marco Polo ASIN: B000024OJG
- Prelude, Op. 150 No. 16 Catherine Joly, piano. Accord ASIN: B000004CCT
- Prelude, Op. 150 No. 17 Catherine Joly, piano. Accord ASIN: B000004CCT
- Promenades d'un solitaire I, Op. 78 Marc Pantillon, piano. Claves ASIN: B000026B99
- -- Daniel Blumenthal, piano. Etcetera ASIN: B0000000P8
- -- Gerhard Puchelt, piano. Genesis Records GS 1043 [LP]
- Promenades d'un solitaire II, Op. 80 Daniel Blumenthal, piano. Etcetera ASIN: B0000000P8
- Promenades d'un solitaire II, Op. 80 No.? Hans Kann, piano. Preiser ASIN: B00004LMPW
- Promenades d'un solitaire III, Op. 89 Daniel Blumenthal, piano. Etcetera ASIN: B0000000P8
- Rêveries du promeneur solitaire, Op. 101 Marc Pantillon, piano. Claves ASIN: B000026B99
- Sérénade, Op. 56 Ilona Prunyi, piano. Hungaroton ASIN: B000F6ZIEW
- Sonata No. 4 in B♭ minor Op. 143 Sergio Marengoni, piano. Koch-Disco (Koch International) ASIN: B0000251NE
- Sonatina No. 2 in D major, Op. 147 Daniel Blumenthal, piano. Etcetera ASIN: B000025Y9A
- 7 Songs without Words Op. 120 Andreas Meyer-Hermann, piano. CPO ASIN: B00000AEOI
- Tarantella No. 1, Op. 53 Gerhard Puchelt, piano. Genesis Records GS 1043 [LP]
- 2 Tarantellas (Nos. 3 & 4), Op. 85 Andreas Meyer-Hermann, piano. CPO ASIN: B00000AEOI
- Tarantella No. 4, Op. 85 No.2 Catherine Joly, piano. Accord ASIN: B000004CCT
- -- Julianne Markavitch, piano. Starlight Music AZ ASIN: B00006VXOF
- Traumbilder, Op. 79 Dirk Joeres, piano. Innov. Music Prod. ASIN: B000000TIC
- La Truite (Die Forelle) Caprice brillant, Op. 33 Frank Glazer, piano. Bridge ASIN: B000FO4494
- -- Catherine Joly, piano. Accord ASIN: B000004CCT
- Valses-rêveries, Op. 122 Gerhard Puchelt, piano. Genesis Records GS 1043 [LP]
- 33 Variations on a theme of Beethoven, Op. 130 Catherine Joly, piano. Accord ASIN: B000004CCT
- -- Andreas Meyer-Hermann, piano. Fsm Adagio ASIN: B000003V5V
- -- Gerhard Puchelt, piano. Genesis Records GS 1043 [LP]
- Variations on a theme of Schumann Op. 142 Andreas Meyer-Hermann, piano. CPO ASIN: B00000AEOI
- Voyage autour de ma chambre, Op. 140 Andreas Meyer-Hermann, piano. CPO ASIN: B00000AEOI
- -- Stéphane Reymond, piano. Cantando 9208
- Voyage autour de ma chambre, Op. 140 No. 2 Clemens Kröger, piano. Thorofon (Bella Musica) ASIN: B0000279WB
- Voyage autour de ma chambre, Op. 140 No. 5 Clemens Kröger, piano. Thorofon (Bella Musica) ASIN: B0000279WB
- Waltz, Op. 93 No. 1 Clemens Kröger, piano. Thorofon (Bella Musica) ASIN: B0000279WB
