= Catherine Joly =

French pianist

Catherine Joly is a French classical pianist, born in Belfort.

== Biography ==
After a First Prize for piano obtained unanimously at the age of 15 at the Nancy Conservatory, Joly was admitted at the Conservatoire de Paris in the class of Lucette Descaves, then in that of Reine Gianoli. She obtained a First Prize for piano and for chamber music. She also worked with Jean Hubeau and Annie d'Arco. She also obtained the Concertist Diploma from the École Normale de Musique de Paris.

Catherine Joly has been a soloist at Radio France since 1978, and at the Cziffra and Menuhin foundations since 1981. She performs as soloist and in chamber ensembles in France and abroad (Switzerland, Germany). Among the places to which she has been invited, the Festival Estival de Paris, the defunct Mai Musical de Bordeaux, the Besançon International Music Festival.

== Selected recordings ==
- Reynaldo Hahn: Premières valses; Le Rossignol Éperdu; Accord publisher
- Vincent d'Indy: Grande Sonate en mi, Op. 63; Helvetia, 3 valses, Op.17; Cybelia publisher, CY 707
- Stephen Heller: Works for piano; Accord publisher

== Sources ==
- Official website
