= Jean-Baptiste Mintsa-Mi-Mba =

Gabonese politician

Jean-Baptiste Mintsa-Mi-Mba (24 November 1948 – 10 February 2009) was a Gabonese politician who served as Second Vice-president of the Senate of Gabon. He was a member of the Gabonese Democratic Party (PDG).

Mintsa-Mi-Mba was born in Cocobeach, located in the Estuaire Province of Gabon. He helped create the National Center for Blood transfusion and was the center's first director; as a result, he was known as Gabon's "father of blood transfusion". He became a member of the Senate when that body was established in 1997, being elected as a Senator from Noya Department. He was re-elected to the Senate in January 2009, but he died in Paris on 10 February 2009.

Mintsa-Mi-Mba held the rank of Commander of the Equatorial Star.
