= Maria Orwid =

Polish psychiatrist

Maria Orwid (23 July 1930 – 9 February 2009) was a Polish psychiatrist and pioneer of Child and Family psychiatry and of Family therapy in Poland. She was a professor of the Jagiellonian University. As a survivor of the Holocaust, she contributed to the literature.
