= Buck Griffin =

American singer-songwriter

- Born: February 23, 1923
- Died: February 14, 2009 (aged 85)
- Genres: Hillbilly; rockabilly; honky tonk; country
- Years active: 1954–1965
- Labels: Foundation; Rotary; Holiday Inn; MGM; Lin

Albert C. "Buck" Griffin (February 23, 1923 – February 14, 2009) was an American singer and songwriter. He was a popular performer live and on radio, though he never scored a hit on record, and was compared to Hank Williams and Conway Twitty.

Griffin was born in Corsicana, Texas, and was raised in Oklahoma and Missouri. He began playing guitar at age 12 and sang lead in a high school dance band. After school Griffin took jobs as a ditch digger and oil driller in Kansas, where he played in local clubs. In the late 1940s he was offered a slot on Oklahoma City radio station WKY under the name Chuck Wyman.

Joe Leonard, owner of a Gainesville, Texas, radio station, offered Griffin a contract on Lin Records in 1954, and had him record his first single at the studios of Dallas's WFAA. "It Don't Make No Nevermind" b/w "Meadowlark Boogie" was his first release, but it went nowhere, and several more releases later in 1954 (some of which featured members of Bob Wills's band) also failed to attract attention. Despite this, Griffin was a popular live performer, performing with Red Foley and Marty Robbins among others. Additionally, he did well as a songwriter; his "Goin' Home All Alone" was recorded by Wade Ray, and Janis Martin did a version of his failed single "Let's Elope, Baby". He appeared on ABC-TV's Talent Varieties on August 2, 1955, singing "Next to Mine".

In 1956, Griffin contracted with the Dallas radio show Big D Jamboree, and MGM Records picked up his previous Lin Records releases for national distribution. Though MGM released 45s from Griffin into the early 1960s, he never scored a hit; later releases on Holiday Inn Records fared no better.

In 1963 Griffin started Rotary Records and recorded several singles on that label as well as having a local television show on KCKT in Hoisington, Kansas. From 1965 Griffin sold Bibles and worked as a Driller in the Kansas and Oklahoma oilfields as well as becoming a licensed pilot, owning several airplanes. He was a major force behind the building of an airstrip south of Hoisington, Kansas. He still wrote and published songs and occasionally recorded. In the 1970s his chronic asthma became a barrier to performing. He died of complications to emphysema on February 14, 2009, in Sayre, Oklahoma.
