= Evan Ira Farber =

Faculty Emeritus and former Head Librarian at Earlham College

- Born: June 30, 1922; Bronx, New York
- Died: February 12, 2009 (aged 86); Richmond, Indiana
- Education: University of North Carolina at Chapel Hill
- Known for: Head Librarian at Earlham College

Evan Ira Farber (June 30, 1922 – February 12, 2009) was Faculty Emeritus and former Head Librarian at Earlham College. Throughout his career, he was active with the American Library Association (ALA) and the Association of College and Research Libraries (ACRL), holding positions that included Chair of the ACRL College Library Section from 1968 to 1969 and President of the ACRL from 1978 to 1979. He was also active with the ACRL College Leadership Committee and the ACRL College Libraries Mentor Program.

== Early career ==
Farber was born in the Bronx, New York on June 30, 1922, to Meyer Farber and Estelle Helen Shapiro Farber. He graduated from the University of North Carolina at Chapel Hill with a bachelor's degree in 1944 and attended Princeton University for two years before leaving to teach at the Massachusetts State College. He returned to Chapel Hill, graduating in 1951 with a master's degree in political science and in 1953 a bachelor's degree in library science. He then held positions at the Livingston State Teachers College in Alabama from 1953 to 1955 and served as a librarian at Emory University from 1955 to 1962.

== Bibliographic instruction ==
Farber was highly regarded as a leader and authority on the subject of bibliographic instruction, he began hosting conferences on the subject at Earlham College in 1977. He developed a successful bibliographic instruction program tailored to Earlham College in its specific context. This mainly entailed integrating the instruction into specific college courses within the college's curriculum. His five defining points of the college's bibliographic instruction program in 1974 included flexibility and variety in the methods of instruction, the use of structured examples and illustrations in the instruction process, personalized reference services, the perception of librarians as educators, and the extension of the library's resources to include those materials presented as much as possible. The central objectives of the program at that time were to indicate to students the differences between high school and academic libraries, to show that resources relevant to nearly any topic exist and the importance of choosing the most important and pertinent ones, to illustrate basic search strategy principles transferable to any topic, to emphasize the amount of resources that exist and the usefulness of working with a reference librarian, and to develop a readiness to search outside of the library if necessary. This approach to bibliographic instruction arose from his observations that colleges provide a particularly suitable context for both librarians and faculty to emphasize undergraduate education more than research.

== Faculty–librarian cooperation ==
To support effective bibliographic instruction, he has also emphasized the necessity of developing faculty-librarian cooperation. By working together with faculty, librarians were involved in specific courses at Earlham College and were thus able to structure their instruction towards specific assignments, with the result that the instruction became directly relevant to students' interests. Regarding the benefits of an ideal cooperative relationship between faculty and librarians, he stated: "When that cooperative relationship works well, it can result in assignments that approach, if not reach, what I consider the ideal: where both the teacher's objectives and the librarian's objectives are not only achieved, but are mutually reinforcing – the teacher's objectives being those that help students attain a better understanding of the course's subject matter, and the librarian's objectives being those that enhance the students' ability to find and evaluate information."

== Awards ==
- 1980 Academic/Research Librarian of the Year Award
- 1987 Miriam Dudley Instruction Librarian Award
- 1992 University of North Carolina School of Information and Library Science Distinguished Alumni Award
