= Sławomir Rutka =

Polish footballer (1975–2009)

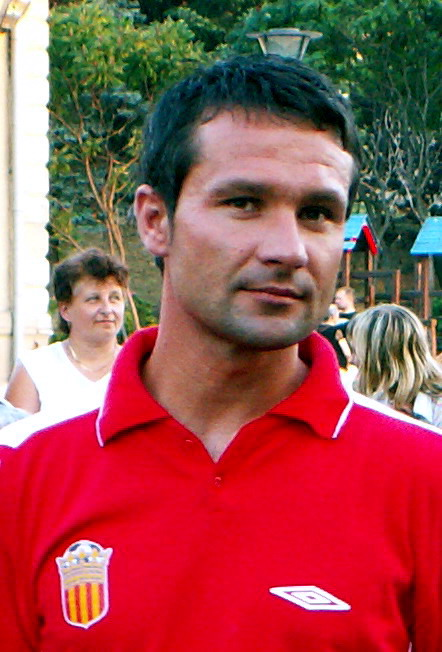

Personal information
- Date of birth: 16 April 1975
- Place of birth: Jedlnia-Letnisko, Poland
- Date of death: 22 February 2009 (aged 33)
- Place of death: Pionki, Poland
- Height: 1.81 m (5 ft 11 1/2 in)
- Position: Defender

Senior career*
Years	Team	Apps	(Gls)
1992–1994	Proch Pionki		
1995	Radomiak Radom		
1995–1997	MG MZKS Kozienice		
1997–1999	Korona Kielce		
1999–2000	Legia Warsaw	8	(0)
2000	Widzew Łódź	10	(0)
2000–2001	Ruch Radzionków	13	(0)
2001–2002	Widzew Łódź	17	(0)
2002–2003	ŁKS Łódź	16	(0)
2003–2008	Korona Kielce		
2008–2009	Proch Pionki		

Managerial career
- 2008–2009: Proch Pionki (player-manager)
- * Club domestic league appearances and goals

Sławomir Rutka (16 April 1975 – 22 February 2009) was a Polish footballer who played as a central defender.

== Football career ==
Rutka was born in Jedlnia-Letnisko. During his 17-year senior career he represented Proch Pionki (1992–94, 2008–09), Radomiak Radom (1995), MG MZKS Kozienice (1995–97), Korona Kielce (1997–98, 2003–08), Legia Warsaw (1999), Widzew Łódź (2000, 2001–02), Ruch Radzionków (2000–01) and ŁKS Łódź (2002), appearing in a total of 69 Ekstraklasa games in representation of the fourth, fifth, sixth and seventh clubs.

In late February 2009, Rutka was found dead by his wife after having committed suicide by hanging. Already retired and coaching his first team Proch, he had been previously linked with a match fixing network, which had resulted in a two-year ban; he was 33 years old.

== Honours ==
Korona Kielce

- II liga: 2004–05
- III liga, gr. IV: 2003–04
