= Boris Yavitz =

Dean of Colombia Business School (1923–2009)

Boris "Bob" Yavitz (June 4, 1923, Tbilisi – February 14, 2009) was the dean of Columbia Business School from 1975 to 1982. He was credited with restoring the reputation and stability of the school, which had been suffering from a divisive atmosphere before his accession. He also served as the deputy chairman and director of the Federal Reserve Bank of New York from 1977 to 1982.

Yavitz was born in Tbilisi and raised in Tel Aviv. He received a degree at the University of Cambridge. During World War II he served in the British Navy, then attended Columbia where he received a master's degree in engineering and doctorate in business. Yavitz died on February 14, 2009, from prostate cancer at the age of 85 in Hampton Bays, New York.
