= Marylin Frascone =

French classical pianist (born 1975)

Marylin Frascone (born 1975 in Pamiers) is a contemporary French woman classical pianist.

== Discography ==
- 2007 - Franz Liszt's Pieces for piano (Transart/Naïve)
- 2008 - Moussorgsky's Pictures at an Exhibition; Chopin: Fantaisie, Berceuse, Mazurkas, Polonaise héroïque (Intégral Classic INT.221164)
- 2009 - Liszt's Sonata in B minor; Ravel's Gaspard de la nuit (Intégral Classic INT.221168)
- 2010 - Schumann, Mozart, Beethoven, Scriabin, Bizet/Horowitz: "Fantasies for piano", Integral Classic 221.174)
