= Lublin Dilja =

Albanian diplomat

Lublin Dilja (1957 – February 2, 2009) was an Albanian ambassador to the United Nations.

== Biography ==
Dilja was post-communist first Albanian Ambassador to the United States from 1993 to 1997, then a member of the Democratic Party of Albania from 2001 to 2004.

He represented Albania as Ambassador to the U.N. on an ad interim basis, as chargé d'affaires, until he was replaced in 2006 by Adrian Neritani.

Dilja died at 51 years of age in New York City, in the United States, on February 2, 2009, following a long illness.
