= Thubten Dhargye Ling =

American Tibetan Buddhist center

Coordinates: 33.771551°N 118.151033°W

- Location within the Los Angeles metropolitan area Location within California Location within the United States

Religion
- Affiliation: Tibetan Buddhism

Location
- Location: 3500 E. Fourth Street, Long Beach, California, 90814
- Country: United States

Architecture
- Founder: Geshe Gyeltsen

Website
- www.gstdl.org

The Thubten Dhargye Ling Buddhist Center is an American Tibetan Buddhist center founded by Geshe Gyeltsen in 1978.

The Thubten Dhargye Ling Buddhist Center was founded in 1978 by Geshe Gyeltsen at the "urging of his students," according to the Los Angeles Times. The center, which was originally located in Los Angeles, relocated to its present location in Long Beach, California, in 1996.

Geshe Gyeltsen died at the center in February 2009 at the age of 85.
