= Geshe Gyeltsen =

Tibetan lama and human rights activist

Geshe Tsultim Gyeltsen (1923 – February 13, 2009) was a Tibetan lama and human rights activist living in the United States. Gyeltsen had been described as "one of the last living Tibetan Buddhist masters to have been trained in Tibet" before 1959.

Geshe Gyeltsen founded the Thubten Dhargye Ling Buddhist center in 1978. He was a member of the same Buddhist sect, known as the Gelug or Yellow Hat sect, as the 14th Dalai Lama.

== Biography ==
=== Early life ===
Gyeltsen was born Jamphel Yeshe in 1923, in Kham, an eastern ethno-cultural Tibet. He became a Buddhist monk when he was seven years old. He traveled to the Gaden Monastery near Lhasa when he was sixteen years old. Gyeltsen remained as a student at the monastery for the next twenty years.

=== India and United Kingdom ===
Gyeltsen and fifty other Tibetan monks fled to India following the 14th Dalai Lama during the 1959 Tibetan uprising. His group, which included fifty monks, travelled for a month over the Himalaya Mountains. Upon reaching the Indian town of Dalhousie, he completed his Buddhist studies at Gyuto Tantric College. He earned the rank and title of Geshe, which has been described as a "doctorate of Tibetan Buddhism", while living in a refugee camp in West Bengal. Gyeltsen went to England in 1963, where he spent more than a decade educating Tibetan refugee children in Tibetan language, culture, and Buddhist philosophy in the United Kingdom. In 1970, Gyeltsen gave back his vows and married Jennifer Humphries. While married, Gyeltsen continued teaching Buddhism. In 1976, his wife gave birth to their only child; a boy they named, Tsewang Gyeltsen.

=== United States ===
Gyeltsen immigrated to the United States from the United Kingdom in 1976. Shortly after, he and his wife mutually divorced. Gyeltsen then reinstated his vows as a monk and began teaching Tibetan language, meditation and religious studies as a professor at the University of California, Santa Barbara and the University of California, Los Angeles. Gyeltsen founded the Thubten Dhargye Ling Buddhist Center in Los Angeles (later Long Beach) in 1978. Gyeltsen also founded Tibetan Buddhist centers throughout North America, including Texas, Colorado, Alaska, Mexico, the Grass Valley in northern California, as well as Europe.

Gyeltsen hosted the Dalai Lama on visits to Los Angeles on six occasions. The most recent visit by the Dalai Lama was in 2006.

He served as a member of the board of directors of the International Campaign for Tibet, an independence group founded by actor Richard Gere. Gyeltsen wrote the books Mirror of Wisdom and Compassion: The Key to Great Awakening.

== Death ==
Geshe Gyeltsen died on February 13, 2009, at his home at the Thubten Dhargye Ling Buddhist center at the age of 85 after a short illness. Gyeltsen cremation ceremony was held in southern India. His relics were then returned to the center. Gyeltsen is survived by a son, Tsewang Gyeltsen of Long Beach; a sister and several nieces and nephews.
