= Ben Blank =

Ben Blank (November 26, 1921 – February 3, 2009) was an American innovator in television graphics, working for both CBS and the American Broadcasting Company, who has been credited with creating the first news graphic and the first use of a logo displayed over a news anchor's shoulder, winning an Emmy Award for his work.

== Early life ==
Blank was born in San Francisco, California. He moved with his family to Union City, New Jersey, where he won an art contest sponsored by the Hudson Dispatch for his sketches, which he would often make on butcher paper at the grocery store his father operated. Blank attended Cooper Union in New York City, which was interrupted by his service in the United States Army during World War II.

== Television career ==
While at CBS News in October 1957, following the launch of the Sputnik 1 by the Soviet Union, Blank attached a golf ball to a bent coat hanger which was attached to a turntable that rotated the ball around a globe. Blank described how "We filmed it for a minute, edited it into a loop, and it led the evening news", in a clip that has been described as the first newscast graphic. He was also credited with being the first to have a graphic design placed over the shoulder of the news anchor. He served as the graphics director at CBS News until 1962. CBS News anchor Walter Cronkite described Blank as "a pioneer of television graphics at a time when his artistry and genius were all we had to demonstrate a complicated story".

In a 1961 visit to West Germany, Blank visited the state television network's graphic department, discovering that they were using methods under which the staff took eight days to prepare an on-screen graphic as they were sending drawings to outside processors for photo processing and type house work. Blank introduced rapid photo processing and the use of pre-printed letters in captions that were described as having "advanced German graphics knowledge 10 years".

Blank moved to ABC News in 1962, and spent three decades there, retiring as managing director of graphics for the network. In 1963, Blank created a graphic for a story on the Vietnam War in which a map of Vietnam was lit on fire on camera "to suggest the intensity of the conflict". After Gordon Cooper flew aboard Mercury-Atlas 9 on the last mission of Project Mercury in May 1963, Blank obtained a Mercury capsule model from the office of science correspondent Jules Bergman, placed it in a pail of water and had a camera zoom in tight while a stagehand jiggled the bucket. During a 1963 visit to New York City by President John F. Kennedy, Blank had his graphic artists prepare a map of the city with the motorcade route cut out, using colored cardboard to show the president's progress. In 1990, Blank was honored with an Emmy Award for his work on Primetime Live, ABC's prime time news magazine program.

John Hockenberry, in his 2006 book, Looking Closer: Critical Writings on Graphic Design, called Blank the "television graphic artist's equivalent of Homer, Marshall McLuhan and Edward R. Murrow rolled into one."

== Death ==
A resident of Teaneck, New Jersey for 55 years, Blank died at age 87 on February 3, 2009. He was survived by his wife Miriam, to whom he had been married for 60 years, two daughters, a son and five grandchildren.
