= Roger C. Kormendi =

American economist

Roger C. Kormendi (July 24, 1949 – February 25, 2009) was an American economist who conducted important research studies in several areas of macroeconomics and finance. A long-time senior member of the Graduate School of Business faculties at the University of Chicago and the University of Michigan, he was the author of over fifty scholarly books and articles.

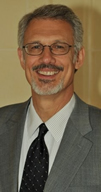
Roger C. Kormendi

== Biography ==
=== Early life and education ===
Roger Charles Kormendi was born on July 24, 1949, in New York. He was the only child of his late parents, Andre and Irene Kormendi. He graduated in 1967 from W.T. Woodson High School in Falls Church, Virginia, and in 1971 from the University of Virginia with High Honors in Economics. He earned a Ph.D. in economics in 1977 from the University of California, Los Angeles, where he was a Chancellor's Intern Fellow.

=== Career ===
His early work focused on macroeconomic monetary and fiscal policy, and helped to form the current understanding of the effect of deficit spending on economic cycles. Later he founded Mid-America Institute for Public Policy Research while at the University of Chicago, and there he led several cutting-edge research projects in areas of then-current economic or financial crises. Among these were Deregulating Financial Services: Public Policy in Flux in 1986 and Black Monday and the Future of Financial Markets in 1989. The most influential, however, was the Institute's publication of Crisis Resolution in the Thrift Industry in 1989, just as Congress was confronting the savings and loan crisis. Its analysis and recommendations were incorporated in many respects both in the legislation passed to address the crisis, the Financial Institutions Reform, Recovery and Enforcement Act of 1989, or FIRREA, and in the policies adopted by the federal agency created by FIRREA, Resolution Trust Corporation, which conducted the thrift clean-up.

Dr. Kormendi co-founded Kormendi \ Gardner Partners, known as KGP, a financial advisory firm based in Washington, D.C. At KGP, Dr. Kormendi directed and co-directed many innovative financial engagements for public and private clients. Among these were the first “pipeline sale” public-private partnership for the Department of Defense, the renegotiation of the largest federally assisted acquisition of a failed thrift for the Resolution Trust Corporation ("RTC"), the first variable equity retained interest transactions (also for RTC), and the first plan for distributing a Sarbanes-Oxley Fair Fund established to compensate investors in variable annuity funds harmed by illegal trading by market timers for the Securities and Exchange Commission. In addition, Dr. Kormendi led the KGP team that advised a private client on its effort to re-capitalize Credit Foncier de France, a historic bank owned by the French government.

=== Marriage and children ===
Kormendi was married three times: first, to the former Paula Stone; second, to Kira Karmazin; third, to Traci Jefferson. He had three sons by his first marriage, Andre, Peter, and Alex.

=== Death and afterward ===
Kormendi died February 25, 2009, at the age of 59 after a long battle with Creutzfeldt–Jakob disease, a degenerative brain disorder.
