= Webster Kitchell =

Webster Lardner Kitchell (May 21, 1931 – February 9, 2009) was a Unitarian Universalist theologian and author. He was minister emeritus of the Unitarian Universalist Congregation of Santa Fe in New Mexico.

== Education and ministerial career ==
Kitchell graduated from Amherst College and served as a corporal in the United States Marine Corps during the Korean War. Following his discharge, he graduated from Harvard Divinity School in June 1957, and in October of that year he was ordained as an associate minister at the Unitarian Church of All Souls in New York City. Kitchell was the first associate minister at that church since 1941.

In June 1960, Kitchell attracted attention when he delivered a sermon that argued the national purpose of the U.S. was defined by its role within the international community. "We must have a new ideal to dedicate ourselves to," he told his congregation. "We must fasten our ideals upon the vision of a world community, if not as a political fact, at least a world community in cooperation and spirit." In the same sermon, Kitchell challenged comments made by evangelical leader Billy Graham that the only way to reform the United States was to reform its population, referring to that assertion as "a myth."

Later in 1960, Kitchell left New York to become the first minister for the newly formed Eliot Unitarian Chapel in Kirkwood, Missouri. In 1973, he was named minister for the First Unitarian Universalist Church of Houston, Texas. In 1980, Kitchell became the first ordained minister for the Unitarian Universalist Congregation of Santa Fe, which had operated with a lay fellowship since its founding in 1952.

In 2000, Kitchell became minister emeritus at the Unitarian Universalist Congregation of Santa Fe when Stephen Furrer was named minister for the congregation.

== Literary career ==
Kitchell is the author of three books: God's Dog: Conversations with Coyote (1991), Coyote Says: More Conversations With God's Dog (1996) and Get a God: More Conversations with Coyote (2002) All three books, which were published by the Unitarian Universalist Association of Congregations, provide dialogues relating to concepts of faith, philosophy, existentialism and life's truths as seen through a Unitarian Universalist spectrum. The Coyote character is inspired by American Indian theology. "For Coyote and me, faith means that we have to live our lives as if the cosmos, the planet, life, our fellow creatures, and ourselves are sacred," says Kitchell in Get a God: More Conversations with Coyote. "That is the myth Coyote and I have returned to."
