= Pierre Pierlot =

French oboist

Pierre Pierlot (French: [pjɛʁ pjɛʁlo]; 26 April 1921 – 9 January 2007) was a French oboist. He was a member of the Paris Opera orchestra and taught at the Conservatoire de Paris. One of his students was Heinz Holliger.
