= Erato Records =

Music label

- Parent company: Warner Music Group
- Founded: 1953
- Founder: Philippe Loury
- Genre: Classical music (Early and Baroque music)
- Country of origin: France
- Location: Paris
- Official website: www.warnerclassics.com

Erato Records is a record label founded in 1953 as Erato Disques S.A. by Philippe Loury to promote French classical music. Loury was head of éditions musicales Costallat. His first releases in France were licensed from the Haydn Society of Boston, and he made Erato's first recording in January 1953: Marc-Antoine Charpentier's Te Deum with Les Jeunesses Muslcales.

Michel Garcin became the label's artistic director and producer and built up the catalogue with contemporary French composers such as Henri Dutilleux and French artists: Jean-François Paillard (234 records), Marie-Claire Alain (234 records), Maurice André (198 records), Jean-Pierre Rampal (127 records), and Lily Laskine.

Conductors of Baroque music included Michel Corboz, Claudio Scimone and Marcel Couraud, while Theodor Guschlbauer conducted music of the classical period. Corboz also recorded numerous works by Claudio Monteverdi. Charles Dutoit, Jean Martinon and Alain Lombard conducted works from the standard orchestral repertory. John Eliot Gardiner focused on conducting music of the Baroque, while Joel Cohen specialized in medieval music.

In 1963, the Musical Heritage Society began releasing Erato recordings in the United States under their label and eventually issued nearly the entire Erato catalogue.

In 1972 RCA Records obtained a minority interest in Erato and agreed to distribute Erato's products in the United States under RCA's classical labels and in France and other countries under the Erato label. Under the agreement Loury continued as the head of Erato, and the Musical Heritage Society retained the right to distribute Erato products in the United States. Marcel Garcin became responsible for coordinating Erato's relationship with RCA. R. Peter Munves, head of classical music at RCA, stated: "The Erato classical catalog is an absolutely marvelous complement to RCA's own classical catalogs. It has the largest catalog of Bach recordings in the world as well as extensive baroque and contemporary listings."

In 1985 Daniel Toscan du Plantier left the French film company Gaumont and took over Erato Records and Erato Films, but the venture was not successful, and he left by 1988.

== Warner Music Group acquisition ==
In 1992, Erato was taken over by Warner Music Group, which provided wider distribution and greater resources. The company retired the Erato label before 2003.

In 2013, the Erato Records label was revived with Warner Music Group acquisition of EMI Classics and Virgin Classics. Erato Records absorbed the Virgin Classics artists roster and catalogue, while the EMI Classics label's artists roster and catalogue was absorbed into the Warner Classics label, since the rights to the EMI Classics and Virgin Classics names were retained by the seller Universal Music Group. Alain Lanceron, formerly President of Virgin Classics and Director of EMI Classics France, joined Warner after its acquisition of another classical music label, the Parlophone Label Group, in 2013. He was made president of Warner Classics and Erato in 2014. All of these changes marked "a renewed focus on classical music within the [Warner Group]."
