= 2016–17 Queen of the South F.C. season =

Queen of the South
2016–17 season
- Chairman: Billy Hewitson
- Manager: Gavin Skelton; Jim Thomson; Gary Naysmith
- Stadium: Palmerston Park
- Scottish Championship: 6th
- Challenge Cup: Sixth round
- League Cup: Third round
- Scottish Cup: Third round
- Top goalscorer: League: Stephen Dobbie (19); All: Stephen Dobbie (26)
- Highest home attendance: 3,703 vs. Hibernian, 24 September 2016
- Lowest home attendance: 1,147 vs. St Mirren, 6 December 2016
- Average home league attendance: 1,857
Home colours	Away colours

The 2016–17 season is Queen of the South's fourth consecutive season back in the second tier of Scottish football and their fourth season in the Scottish Championship, having been promoted as champions from the Scottish Second Division at the end of the 2012–13 season. Queens will also be competing in the Challenge Cup, League Cup and the Scottish Cup.

== Summary ==
Queen of the South finished sixth in the Scottish Championship.

The club reached the sixth round of the Challenge Cup, the third round of the League Cup and the third round of the Scottish Cup.

=== Management ===
The club began the 2016-17 season under the management of Gavin Skelton and he remained in charge until 7 November 2016 when he resigned for personal reasons. Former club captain and current football development manager Jim Thomson was placed in temporary charge along with another former club captain Graeme Robertson, who was back home for one month after coaching in China. Gary Naysmith was appointed the club's manager along with his assistant Dougie Anderson on 1 December 2016, having previously been in-charge of part-time club East Fife.

== Results & fixtures ==
Win Draw Loss Abandoned or Postponed

=== Preseason ===
1 July 2016 Friendly	Dalbeattie Star	0 – 4	Queen of the South	Islecroft Stadium
19:00		QOSFC Report; Dalbeattie Star Report	Hilson 23', 35'; Moxon 49'; Smith 67'	Attendance: 380

5 July 2016 Friendly	Carlisle	2 – 3	Queen of the South	Brunton Park
16:00	Lambe 49'; Grainger 57'	QOSFC Report; CUFC Report	Hilson 30'; Rigg 45'; Moxon 88'	Attendance: Closed doors

9 July 2016 Friendly	Gretna 2008	1 – 6	Queen of the South	Raydale Park
12:00	A. Trialist 79'	QOSFC Report	Dowie 9', 31'; Smith 19', 44'; Lyle 83', 87'	Attendance: 300

10 July 2016 Friendly	Queen of the South	3 – 1	South Shields	Raydale Park
15:00	Jacobs 7'; Dykes 8'; Brown 50'	QOSFC Report	A. Trialist 55'	Attendance: 300

12 July 2016 Friendly	Annan Athletic	0 – 4	Queen of the South	Galabank
19:45		QOSFC Report; Annan Athletic Report	Rigg 21'; Lyle 68', 70'; Smith 88'	Attendance: 300

13 July 2016 Friendly	Penrith	3 – 4	Queen of the South	Frenchfields Stadium
19:30	A. Trialist 23'; B. Trialist 60'; C. Trialist 64'	QOSFC Report; Groundhopper2000 Report	McInally 47', 66'; B. Murray 62'; Bell 90'	Attendance: 200

26 July 2016 Friendly	Workington	1 – 2	Queen of the South	Borough Park
19:30	Kilifin 2'	Workington Reds Report; QOSFC Report	Rigg 10'; Brotherston 85'	Attendance: 275; Referee: Backhouse

=== Scottish Championship ===
6 August 2016 ScoChamp Match 1	Dundee United	1 – 1	Queen of the South	Tannadice Park
15:00	van der Velden 58'	QOSFC Report; BBC Sport Report	Millar 40'	Attendance: 7,058; Referee: Dallas; Man of the Match: Millar

13 August 2016 ScoChamp Match 2	Queen of the South	4 – 1	Ayr United	Palmerston Park
15:00	Lyle 12', 53'; Dobbie 44'; Dykes 74'	QOSFC Report; BBC Sport Report	Nisbet 61'	Attendance: 1,982; Referee: Finnie; Man of the Match: Dobbie

20 August 2016 ScoChamp Match 3	Queen of the South	2 – 0	Falkirk	Palmerston Park
15:00	Dobbie 34', 50'	QOSFC Report; BBC Sport Report		Attendance: 1,841; Referee: Kirkland; Man of the Match: Dobbie

27 August 2016 ScoChamp Match 4	Dunfermline Athletic	0 – 1	Queen of the South	East End Park
15:00	Talbot (red card) 62'	QOSFC Report; BBC Sport Report	Lyle 45'	Attendance: 3,973; Referee: Charleston; Man of the Match: Lyle

10 September 2016 ScoChamp Match 5	St Mirren	1 – 3	Queen of the South	Paisley 2021 Stadium
15:00	Walsh 41'	QOSFC Report; BBC Sport Report	Lyle 12', 43'; Dobbie 55'	Attendance: 3,102; Referee: Cook; Man of the Match: Hilson

17 September 2016 ScoChamp Match 6	Queen of the South	3 – 1	Raith Rovers	Palmerston Park
15:00	Dobbie 52', 68'; Brotherston 80'	QOSFC Report; BBC Sport Report	Mvoto 90'	Attendance: 1,864; Referee: Duncan; Man of the Match: Dobbie

24 September 2016 ScoChamp Match 7	Queen of the South	0 – 0	Hibernian	Palmerston Park
15:00		QOSFC Report; BBC Sport Report	Stevenson (yellow card) 41' (yellow-red card) 55'	Attendance: 3,703; Referee: McLean; Man of the Match: Dowie

1 October 2016 ScoChamp Match 8	Dumbarton	0 – 0	Queen of the South	Cheaper Insurance Direct Stadium
15:00		QOSFC Report; BBC Sport Report		Attendance: 840; Referee: Northcroft; Man of the Match: Brownlie

15 October 2016 ScoChamp Match 9	Queen of the South	0 – 5	Greenock Morton	Palmerston Park
15:00		QOSFC Report; BBC Sport Report	Forbes 6'; McDonagh 33'; Oliver 36'; Quitongo 64'; O'Ware 72' (pen.)	Attendance: 1,695; Referee: Kirkland; Man of the Match: Dykes

22 October 2016 ScoChamp Match 10	Ayr United	1 – 0	Queen of the South	Somerset Park
15:00	Cairney 52'	QOSFC Report; BBC Sport Report		Attendance: 1,842; Referee: Beaton; Man of the Match: Marshall

29 October 2016 ScoChamp Match 11	Raith Rovers	1 – 0	Queen of the South	Stark's Park
17:15	Stewart 90'	QOSFC Report; BBC Sport Report		Attendance: 1,244; Referee: Allan; Man of the Match: Jacobs

5 November 2016 ScoChamp Match 12	Queen of the South	1 – 4	Dundee United	Palmerston Park
15:00	Anderson 45'	QOSFC Report; BBC Sport Report	Durnan 14'; Andreu 22'; Fraser 57'; Murray 77'	Attendance: 2,316; Referee: McLean; Man of the Match: Marshall

19 November 2016 ScoChamp Match 13	Hibernian	4 – 0	Queen of the South	Easter Road
15:00	Graham 8'; Higgins 42' (o.g.); Gray 52'; Boyle 65'	QOSFC Report; BBC Sport Report		Attendance: 13,861; Referee: Charleston; Man of the Match: Robinson

3 December 2016 ScoChamp Match 14	Queen of the South	1 – 2	Dumbarton	Palmerston Park
15:00	Lyle 80'	QOSFC Report; BBC Sport Report	Stevenson 32'; Fleming 42' (pen.)	Attendance: 1,261; Referee: Duncan; Man of the Match: Hamill

6 December 2016 ScoChamp Match 15	Queen of the South	2 – 3	St Mirren	Palmerston Park
19:45	Dobbie 17', 42'	QOSFC Report; SPFL Report	Magennis 20'; Gordon 57'; Mallan 90'	Attendance: 1,147; Referee: Allan; Man of the Match: Dobbie

10 December 2016 ScoChamp Match 16	Falkirk	2 – 2	Queen of the South	Falkirk Stadium
15:00	Hippolyte 45', 54'	QOSFC Report; BBC Sport Report	Dobbie 34'; Lyle 60'	Attendance: 4,170; Referee: Walsh; Man of the Match: Lyle

17 December 2016 ScoChamp Match 17	Queen of the South	2 – 2	Dunfermline Athletic	Palmerston Park
15:00	Ashcroft 39' (o.g.); Dobbie 78'	QOSFC Report; BBC Sport Report	Talbot 61'; Higginbotham 73'	Attendance: 1,561; Referee: McKendrick; Man of the Match: Brownlie

24 December 2016 ScoChamp Match 18	Greenock Morton	1 – 0	Queen of the South	Cappielow Park
13:00	O'Ware 17'	QOSFC Report; BBC Sport Report		Attendance: 1,638; Referee: Cook; Man of the Match: Hamill

31 December 2016 ScoChamp Match 19	Queen of the South	0 – 0	Ayr United	Palmerston Park
14:00		QOSFC Report; BBC Sport Report		Attendance: 1,594; Referee: Kirkland; Man of the Match: Marshall

7 January 2017 ScoChamp Match 20	St Mirren	0 – 3	Queen of the South	Paisley 2021 Stadium
15:00		QOSFC Report; BBC Sport Report	Dobbie 45'; Thomson 81'; MacKenzie 88' (o.g.)	Attendance: 3,105; Referee: Northcroft; Man of the Match: Rankin

14 January 2017 ScoChamp Match 21	Dundee United	3 – 3	Queen of the South	Tannadice Park
15:00	Murray 4', 89'; Fraser 77'	QOSFC Report; BBC Sport Report	Dobbie 28'; Thomson 53'; Thomas 65'	Attendance: 6,136; Referee: Muir; Man of the Match: Thomson

21 January 2017 ScoChamp Match 22	Dumbarton	1 – 2	Queen of the South	Cheaper Insurance Direct Stadium
15:00	Nade 61'	QOSFC Report; BBC Sport Report	Thomas 24', 68'	Attendance: 825; Referee: Kirkland; Man of the Match: Thomas

28 January 2017 ScoChamp Match 23	Queen of the South	0 – 1	Hibernian	Palmerston Park
15:00		QOSFC Report; BBC Sport Report	McGinn 52'	Attendance: 3,007; Referee: McLean; Man of the Match: Marshall

4 February 2017 ScoChamp Match 24	Queen of the South	3 – 0	Greenock Morton	Palmerston Park
15:00	Lyle 71'; Jacobs 83'; Thomson 90'	QOSFC Report; BBC Sport Report		Attendance: 1,588; Referee: Madden; Man of the Match: Jacobs

25 February 2017 ScoChamp Match 25	Queen of the South	2 – 1	Raith Rovers	Palmerston Park
15:00	Rankin 7'; Lyle 36'	QOSFC Report; BBC Sport Report	Mvoto 60'	Attendance: 1,484; Referee: Cook; Man of the Match: Rankin

4 March 2017 ScoChamp Match 26	Queen of the South	0 – 2	Falkirk	Palmerston Park
15:00		QOSFC Report; BBC Sport Report	Kidd 45'; Sibbald 79' (pen.)	Attendance: 1,995; Referee: Duncan; Man of the Match: Jacobs

7 March 2017 ScoChamp Match 27	Dunfermline Athletic	1 – 1	Queen of the South	East End Park
19:45	Moffat 17'	QOSFC Report; BBC Sport Report	Thomson 28'	Attendance: 2,653; Referee: Anderson; Man of the Match: Jacobs

11 March 2017 ScoChamp Match 28	Greenock Morton	1 – 0	Queen of the South	Cappielow Park
17:15	Forbes 55'	QOSFC Report; BBC Sport Report		Attendance: 1,451; Referee: Charleston; Man of the Match: Thomson

18 March 2017 ScoChamp Match 29	Queen of the South	0 – 2	St Mirren	Palmerston Park
15:00		QOSFC Report; BBC Sport Report	Mallan 44'; Loy 54' (pen.)	Attendance: 1,728; Referee: Dallas; Man of the Match: Dowie

25 March 2017 ScoChamp Match 30	Raith Rovers	1 – 1	Queen of the South	Stark's Park
15:00	Hardie 10'	QOSFC Report; BBC Sport Report; Rovers Photos	Dobbie 24'	Attendance: 1,609; Referee: Steven; Man of the Match: Dobbie

1 April 2017 ScoChamp Match 31	Queen of the South	4 – 2	Dundee United	Palmerston Park
15:00	Lyle 19'; Dobbie 43'; Dykes 81'; Hilson 89'	QOSFC Report; BBC Sport Report; Arabs Photos	Mikkelsen 27', 55'	Attendance: 1,514; Referee: Finnie; Man of the Match: Thomson

8 April 2017 ScoChamp Match 32	Ayr United	0 – 2	Queen of the South	Somerset Park
15:00		QOSFC Report; BBC Sport Report; Honest Men Photos	Dobbie 71', 76'	Attendance: 1,476; Referee: Newlands; Man of the Match: Dobbie

15 April 2017 ScoChamp Match 33	Hibernian	3 – 0	Queen of the South	Easter Road
15:00	McGregor 13', 38'; Gray 48'	QOSFC Report; BBC Sport Report; Hibees Photos		Attendance: 17,054; Referee: Cook; Man of the Match: Marshall

22 April 2017 ScoChamp Match 34	Queen of the South	1 – 2	Dumbarton	Palmerston Park
15:00	Dobbie 15'	QOSFC Report; BBC Sport Report; Sons Photos	Stanton 20'; Thomson 39'	Attendance: 1,289; Referee: McKendrick; Man of the Match: McManus

29 April 2017 ScoChamp Match 35	Falkirk	2 – 2	Queen of the South	Falkirk Stadium
15:00	Austin 31'; Muirhead 71' (pen.)	QOSFC Report; BBC Sport Report; Bairns Photos	Dobbie 9', 78'	Attendance: 4,723; Referee: Allan; Man of the Match: Dobbie

6 May 2017 ScoChamp Match 36	Queen of the South	0 – 1	Dunfermline Athletic	Palmerston Park
15:00		QOSFC Report; BBC Sport Report; Pars Photos	Clark 90'	Attendance: 1,849; Referee: Newlands; Man of the Match: Dobbie

=== Scottish Challenge Cup ===
3 September 2016 Round 3	Queen of the South	7 – 1	Stenhousemuir	Palmerston Park
15:00	Hilson 6'; Anderson 10'; Dobbie 33', 46'; Lyle 38' (pen.); Rigg 66', 79'	QOSFC Report; Sky Sports Report	Cook 81'	Attendance: 1,158; Referee: Aitken; Man of the Match: Jacobs

9 October 2016 Round 4	Queen of the South	2 – 0 (a.e.t.)	Linfield	Palmerston Park
13:00	Dykes 102'; Dobbie 109'	QOSFC Report; BBC Sport Report		Attendance: 2,358; Referee: Griffith: Welsh FA; Man of the Match: Dykes

12 November 2016 Round 5	Queen of the South	2 – 0	Alloa Athletic	Palmerston Park
15:00	Dobbie 41', 76'	QOSFC Report; BBC Sport Report		Attendance: 1,180; Referee: Anderson; Man of the Match: Dobbie

18 February 2017 Round 6	Queen of the South	2 – 3	Dundee United	Palmerston Park
17:15	Dobbie 51'; Lyle 90'	QOSFC Report; BBC Sport Report	Telfer 3'; Fraser 11'; Andreu 35'	Attendance: 1,526; Referee: Walsh; Man of the Match: Jacobs

=== Scottish League Cup ===
16 July 2016 Round 1;Group E-1	Queen's Park	0 – 2	Queen of the South	Excelsior Stadium
15:00		QOSFC Report; SPFL Report	Pickard 29'; Dowie 34'	Attendance: 410; Referee: Newlands; Man of the Match: Hamill

19 July 2016 Round 1;Group E-2	Queen of the South	2 – 0	Airdrieonians	Palmerston Park
19:45	Lyle 9', 24'	QOSFC Report; SPFL Report		Attendance: 1,036; Referee: Walsh; Man of the Match: Lyle

23 July 2016 Round 1;Group E-3	Partick Thistle	2 – 1	Queen of the South	Firhill Stadium
15:00	Erskine 82'; Lawless 90'	QOSFC Report; SPFL Report	Hilson 48'	Attendance: 2,358; Referee: Muir; Man of the Match: Hilson

30 July 2016 Round 1; Group E-4	Queen of the South	1 – 0	Stenhousemuir	Palmerston Park
15:00	Hamill 78'	QOSFC Report; SPFL Report		Attendance: 1,013; Referee: Graham; Man of the Match: Hamill

9 August 2016 Round 2	Hibernian	1 – 3	Queen of the South	Easter Road
19:45	Hanlon 22'	QOSFC Report; BBC Sport Report	Dobbie 66'; Anderson 82'; Dykes 86'	Attendance: 7,646; Referee: Anderson; Man of the Match: Robinson

20 September 2016 Round 3	Rangers	5 – 0	Queen of the South	Ibrox Stadium
19:45	Holt 33'; Halliday 62'; Waghorn 63', 71', 83'	QOSFC Report; BBC Sport Report		Attendance: 26,079; Referee: D Robertson; Man of the Match: Hilson

=== Scottish Cup ===
26 November 2016 Round 3	Albion Rovers	P - P	Queen of the South	Exsel Group Stadium
15:00		BBC Sport News
Note: Postponed due to frozen pitch

29 November 2016 Round 3	Albion Rovers	2 – 1	Queen of the South	Exsel Group Stadium
19:45	M. Dunlop 16'; Wallace (yellow card) 80' (yellow-red card) 87'; Ferguson 90'	QOSFC Report; BBC Sport Report; SFA Report	Hamill 76'	Attendance: 387; Referee: Ross; Man of the Match: Hamill

== Player statistics ==
=== Captains ===
No.	P	Name	Country	No. games	Notes
6	DF	Chris Higgins	(Scotland)	15	Club Captain
4	DF	Andy Dowie	(Scotland)	14	Vice Captain
8	MF	John Rankin	(Scotland)	17	Club Captain
11	FW	Stephen Dobbie	(Scotland)	1	Vice Captain

Last updated: 6 May 2017
Source: Competitive match reports.
Competitive matches only
Matches started as captain only
Country: FIFA nationality; No.: Squad number; P: Position; Name: Player name; No. Games: Number of games started as captain.

=== Squad ===
Last updated 4 January 2018

No.	Pos	Nat	Player	Total		Scottish Championship		Challenge Cup		League Cup		Scottish Cup	
No.	Pos	Nat	Player	Apps	Goals	Apps	Goals	Apps	Goals	Apps	Goals	Apps	Goals
1	GK	(England) ENG	Lee Robinson	46	0	35+0	0	4+0	0	6+0	0	1+0	0
2	DF	(Scotland) SCO	Jamie Hamill	32	2	18+3	0	4+0	0	6+0	1	0+1	1
3	DF	(England) ENG	Jordan Marshall	41	0	31+0	0	4+0	0	5+0	0	1+0	0
4	DF	(Scotland) SCO	Andy Dowie	38	1	27+0	0	4+0	0	6+0	1	1+0	0
5	DF	(Scotland) SCO	Darren Brownlie	42	0	34+1	0	4+0	0	2+0	0	1+0	0
6	DF	(Scotland) SCO	Chris Higgins	29	0	23+0	0	1+0	0	4+0	0	1+0	0
*7	MF	(Scotland) SCO	Grant Anderson	29	3	16+3	1	3+0	1	6+0	1	1+0	0
*8	MF	(Scotland) SCO	Mark Millar	26	1	17+1	1	2+1	0	4+0	0	1+0	0
8	MF	(Scotland) SCO	John Rankin	17	1	17+0	1	0+0	0	0+0	0	0+0	0
9	FW	(Scotland) SCO	Derek Lyle	37	14	19+8	10	3+0	2	5+1	2	1+0	0
10	FW	(Scotland) SCO	Dale Hilson	21	3	5+9	1	1+0	1	5+1	1	0+0	0
11	FW	(Scotland) SCO	Stephen Dobbie	42	26	34+1	19	4+0	6	1+1	1	1+0	0
12	FW	(England) ENG	Steven Rigg	16	2	3+7	0	1+1	2	1+3	0	0+0	0
14	MF	(South Africa) RSA	Kyle Jacobs	42	1	33+0	1	4+0	0	3+2	0	0+0	0
15	MF	(Scotland) SCO	Joe Thomson	17	4	16+1	4	0+0	0	0+0	0	0+0	0
16	DF	(Scotland) SCO	Scott Hooper	2	0	0+1	0	0+0	0	1+0	0	0+0	0
*17	MF	(England) ENG	Jake Pickard	19	1	5+6	0	1+2	0	3+1	1	1+0	0
17	MF	(Scotland) SCO	Connor McManus	4	0	1+3	0	0+0	0	0+0	0	0+0	0
18	FW	(Scotland) SCO	Aidan Smith	2	0	0+0	0	0+0	0	1+1	0	0+0	0
19	MF	(England) ENG	Owen Moxon	8	0	0+5	0	0+2	0	0+1	0	0+0	0
20	GK	(England) ENG	James Atkinson	1	0	1+0	0	0+0	0	0+0	0	0+0	0
*21	GK	(Scotland) SCO	Robbie Thomson	0	0	0+0	0	0+0	0	0+0	0	0+0	0
21	GK	(Scotland) SCO	Jack Leighfield	0	0	0+0	0	0+0	0	0+0	0	0+0	0
22	MF	(Scotland) SCO	Callum Tapping	8	0	2+3	0	0+0	0	3+0	0	0+0	0
23	MF	(Scotland) SCO	Dom Thomas	19	3	15+3	3	1+0	0	0+0	0	0+0	0
24	DF	(Scotland) SCO	Scott Mercer	11	0	11+0	0	0+0	0	0+0	0	0+0	0
25	FW	(Australia) AUS	Lyndon Dykes	40	4	20+10	2	2+1	1	4+2	1	1+0	0
26	MF	(Scotland) SCO	Ayrton Sonkur	0	0	0+0	0	0+0	0	0+0	0	0+0	0
27	FW	(Scotland) SCO	Connor Murray	9	0	1+7	0	1+0	0	0+0	0	0+0	0
28	DF	(Scotland) SCO	Richard Murray	0	0	0+0	0	0+0	0	0+0	0	0+0	0
29	MF	(Scotland) SCO	Owen Bell	3	0	1+2	0	0+0	0	0+0	0	0+0	0
31	MF	(England) ENG	Ryan Nelson	0	0	0+0	0	0+0	0	0+0	0	0+0	0
32	FW	(Scotland) SCO	Ross Fergusson	6	0	0+6	0	0+0	0	0+0	0	0+0	0
34	GK	(England) ENG	Cameron Copeland	0	0	0+0	0	0+0	0	0+0	0	0+0	0
35	FW	(Scotland) SCO	Dean Brotherston	16	1	1+9	1	0+2	0	0+4	0	0+0	0
39	MF	(Scotland) SCO	Dan Carmichael	21	0	11+8	0	0+1	0	0+0	0	0+1	0

=== Disciplinary record ===
As of 6 May 2017 (UTC)

Number	Nation	Position	Name	Scottish Championship		Challenge Cup		League Cup		Scottish Cup		Total	
Number	Nation	Position	Name	Yellow card	Red card	Yellow card	Red card	Yellow card	Red card	Yellow card	Red card	Yellow card	Red card
1	(England)	GK	Lee Robinson	4	0	0	0	0	0	0	0	4	0
2	(Scotland)	DF	Jamie Hamill	6	0	0	0	2	0	0	0	8	0
3	(England)	DF	Jordan Marshall	4	0	0	0	0	0	0	0	4	0
4	(Scotland)	DF	Andy Dowie	9	0	0	0	1	0	1	0	11	0
5	(Scotland)	DF	Darren Brownlie	6	0	0	0	0	0	0	0	6	0
6	(Scotland)	DF	Chris Higgins	5	0	0	0	0	0	0	0	5	0
7	(Scotland)	MF	Grant Anderson	1	0	0	0	1	0	0	0	2	0
*8	(Scotland)	MF	Mark Millar	3	0	0	0	1	0	0	0	4	0
8	(Scotland)	MF	John Rankin	3	0	0	0	0	0	0	0	3	0
9	(Scotland)	FW	Derek Lyle	1	0	0	0	0	0	0	0	1	0
10	(Scotland)	FW	Dale Hilson	4	0	0	0	0	0	0	0	4	0
11	(Scotland)	FW	Stephen Dobbie	2	0	0	0	0	0	0	0	2	0
14	(South Africa)	MF	Kyle Jacobs	6	0	0	0	1	0	0	0	7	0
15	(Scotland)	MF	Joe Thomson	1	0	0	0	0	0	0	0	1	0
17	(England)	MF	Jake Pickard	2	0	0	0	2	0	1	0	5	0
22	(Scotland)	MF	Callum Tapping	1	0	0	0	2	0	0	0	3	0
23	(Scotland)	MF	Dom Thomas	1	0	0	0	0	0	0	0	1	0
24	(Scotland)	DF	Scott Mercer	1	0	0	0	0	0	0	0	1	0
25	(Australia)	FW	Lyndon Dykes	1	0	1	0	0	0	0	0	2	0
27	(Scotland)	FW	Connor Murray	0	0	1	0	0	0	0	0	1	0
Totals				61	0	2	0	10	0	2	0	75	0

=== Top scorers ===
Last updated 6 May 2017

Position	Nation	Name	Scottish Championship	Challenge Cup	League Cup	Scottish Cup	Total
1	(Scotland)	Stephen Dobbie	19	6	1	0	26
2	(Scotland)	Derek Lyle	10	2	2	0	14
3	(Scotland)	Joe Thomson	4	0	0	0	4
=	(Australia)	Lyndon Dykes	2	1	1	0	4
5	(Scotland)	Grant Anderson	1	1	1	0	3
=	(Scotland)	Dom Thomas	3	0	0	0	3
=	(Scotland)	Dale Hilson	1	1	1	0	3
8	(England)	Steven Rigg	0	2	0	0	2
=	(Scotland)	Jamie Hamill	0	0	1	1	2
10	(Scotland)	Mark Millar	1	0	0	0	1
=	(Scotland)	Andy Dowie	0	0	1	0	1
=	(England)	Jake Pickard	0	0	1	0	1
=	(Scotland)	Dean Brotherston	1	0	0	0	1
=	(South Africa)	Kyle Jacobs	1	0	0	0	1
=	(Scotland)	John Rankin	1	0	0	0	1

=== Clean sheets ===
R	Pos	Nat	Name	Scottish Championship	Challenge Cup	League Cup	Scottish Cup	Total
1	GK	(England)	Lee Robinson	8	2	3	0	13
20	GK	(England)	James Atkinson	0	0	0	0	0
			Totals	8	2	3	0	13

Last updated: 6 May 2017
Source: Match reports in Competitive matches

== Team statistics ==
=== League table ===
Pos	Team	Pld	W	D	L	GF	GA	GD	Pts	Promotion, qualification or relegation
4	Greenock Morton	36	13	13	10	44	41	+3	52	Qualification for the Premiership play-off quarter-finals
5	Dunfermline Athletic	36	12	12	12	46	43	+3	48	
6	Queen of the South	36	11	10	15	46	52	−6	43	
7	St Mirren	36	9	12	15	52	56	−4	39	
8	Dumbarton	36	9	12	15	46	56	−10	39	

Source: Soccerway
Rules for classification: 1) Points; 2) Goal difference; 3) Number of goals scored

=== Division summary ===
Round	1	2	3	4	5	6	7	8	9	10	11	12	13	14	15	16	17	18	19	20	21	22	23	24	25	26	27	28	29	30	31	32	33	34	35	36
Ground	A	H	H	A	A	H	H	A	H	A	A	H	A	H	H	A	H	A	H	A	A	A	H	H	H	H	A	A	H	A	H	A	A	H	A	H
Result	D	W	W	W	W	W	D	D	L	L	L	L	L	L	L	D	D	L	D	W	D	W	L	W	W	L	D	L	L	D	W	W	L	L	D	L
Position	6	3	3	3	2	1	1	1	2	3	5	6	6	6	6	6	6	6	7	7	7	5	5	5	5	5	5	5	5	5	5	5	6	6	6	6

Updated to match(es) played on 6 May 2017. Source: "Queen of the South". Statto.
A = Away; H = Home; W = Win; D = Draw; L = Loss

=== Management statistics ===
Last updated 6 May 2017

Name	From	To	P	W	D	L	Win% (Note: Win% is the percentage of matches won rounded to two decimal places.)
Gavin Skelton	22 April 2016	5 November 2016	22	12	3	7	54.55
Jim Thomson	12 November 2016	3 December 2016	4	1	0	3	25.00
Gary Naysmith	6 December 2016	6 May 2017	23	6	7	10	26.09

== Transfers ==
=== Players in ===
Player	From	Fee
(Australia) Lyndon Dykes	(Australia) Surfers Paradise Apollo SC	Free
(England) Steven Rigg	(England) Carlisle United	Free
(Scotland) Grant Anderson	(Scotland) Raith Rovers	Free
(Scotland) Jamie Hamill	(Scotland) Kilmarnock	Free
(England) Lee Robinson	Free Agent	Free
(Scotland) Stephen Dobbie	(England) Bolton Wanderers	Free
(Scotland) Dan Carmichael	(Scotland) Hibernian	Free
(Scotland) Dom Thomas	(Scotland) Motherwell	Loan
(Scotland) Joe Thomson	(Scotland) Celtic	Loan
(Scotland) John Rankin	(Scotland) Falkirk	Free
(Scotland) Scott Mercer	(Scotland) East Fife	Undisclosed
(Scotland) Connor McManus	(Scotland) Celtic	Loan

=== Players out ===
Player	To	Fee
(Scotland) Kyle Hutton	(Scotland) St Mirren	Free
(Scotland) Iain Russell	(Scotland) Airdrieonians	Free
(Scotland) Gary Oliver	(Scotland) Greenock Morton	Free
(England) Jack Dickinson	(Scotland) Gretna 2008	Free
(Scotland) Shaun Rutherford	(Scotland) Cowdenbeath	Free
(Scotland) Ryan Conroy	(Scotland) Airdrieonians	Free
(Scotland) Lewis Kidd	(Scotland) Falkirk	Free
(England) Jack Brannan	Free Agent	Free
(Scotland) Aidan Smith	(Scotland) Annan Athletic	Loan
(Scotland) Jack Leighfield	(Scotland) Gretna 2008	Loan
(Scotland) Robbie Thomson	(Scotland) Hamilton Academical	Free
(Scotland) Connor Murray	(Scotland) Gretna 2008	Loan
(Scotland) Richard Murray	(Scotland) Dalbeattie Star	Loan
(Scotland) Mark Millar	(Scotland) Livingston	Free
(England) Jake Pickard	(England) Washington	Free
(Scotland) Grant Anderson	(Scotland) Peterhead	Free
(England) Owen Moxon	(Scotland) Gretna 2008	Loan
(Scotland) Dean Brotherston	(Scotland) Dalbeattie Star	Loan
(England) Ryan Nelson	Free Agent	Free

== See also ==
- List of Queen of the South F.C. seasons
