= 2018–19 Queen of the South F.C. season =

Queen of the South
2018–19 season
- Chairman: Billy Hewitson
- Manager: Gary Naysmith; Allan Johnston
- Stadium: Palmerston Park
- Scottish Championship: 9th
- Scottish Cup: Fifth round
- League Cup: Second round
- Challenge Cup: Third round
- Top goalscorer: League: Stephen Dobbie (21); All: Stephen Dobbie (43)
- Highest home attendance: 3,916 vs. Partick Thistle, 4 May 2019
- Lowest home attendance: 727 vs. Dunfermline Athletic, 15 December 2018
- Average home league attendance: 1,656
Home colours	Away colours	Third colours

The 2018–19 season was Queen of the South's Centenary season and was also the club's sixth consecutive season back in the second tier of Scottish football and their sixth season in the Scottish Championship, having been promoted as champions from the Scottish Second Division at the end of the 2012–13 season. Queens also competed in the Scottish Cup, the League Cup, and the Challenge Cup.

== Summary ==
Queens finished ninth in the Scottish Championship and their league position qualified the club for the semi-final stage of the play-offs, where the played Montrose and progressed 6–2 on aggregate. Queens won the play-off final 3–1 on aggregate versus Raith Rovers.

Queens reached the third round of the Challenge Cup, losing 2–0 away to East Fife.

Queens reached the second round of the League Cup, losing 4–2 after extra time at Palmerston to St Johnstone.

Queens reached the fifth round of the Scottish Cup, losing 4–1 to Aberdeen at Pittodrie.

== Results and fixtures ==
Win Draw Loss Abandoned or Postponed

=== Preseason ===
30 June 2018 Friendly	Annan Athletic	2–2	Queen of the South	Galabank
14:00	Muir 35'; A. Smith 79'	QOSFC Report; Sportsman Report; Black & Golds Photos	Dobbie 2', 14'	Attendance: 450; Referee: Anderson

3 July 2018 Friendly	East Fife	0–4	Queen of the South	Bayview Stadium
19:45		QOSFC Report; Sportsman Report; Fifers Photos	Dykes 6'; Dobbie 13', 31'; Harkins 86'	Attendance: 350; Referee: Kirkland

6 July 2018 Friendly	Queen of the South	2–2	Livingston	Palmerston Park
19:45	Harkins 50'; Dykes 61'	QOSFC Report; Sportsman Report; Lions Photos	Cadden 35'; Gallagher 46'	Attendance: 750; Referee: Dallas

11 July 2018 Friendly	Queen of the South	1–0	Heart of Midlothian	Palmerston Park
19:45	M. Smith 34' (o.g.)	QOSFC Report; Sportsman Report; Jambos Photos		Attendance: 750; Referee: Steven

=== Scottish Championship ===
4 August 2018 ScoChamp Match 1	Greenock Morton	2–2	Queen of the South	Cappielow Park
15:00	Tidser 47'; MacLean 63'	QOSFC Report; BBC Sport Report; Ton Photos	Semple 69'; Todd 76'	Attendance: 2,019; Referee: Duncan; Man of the Match: Todd

11 August 2018 ScoChamp Match 2	Queen of the South	1–2	Dundee United	Palmerston Park
15:00	Dobbie 67'	QOSFC Report; BBC Sport Report; Terrors Photos	Stanton 15'; Šafranko 27'	Attendance: 1,960; Referee: Kirkland; Man of the Match: Jacobs

25 August 2018 ScoChamp Match 3	Falkirk	0–3	Queen of the South	Falkirk Stadium
15:00		QOSFC Report; BBC Sport Report; Bairns Photos	Dobbie 11', 39', 75'	Attendance: 4,026; Referee: Reid; Man of the Match: Dobbie

1 September 2018 ScoChamp Match 4	Queen of the South	5–0	Ayr United	Palmerston Park
15:00	Dobbie 12', 20' (pen.), 22', 84'; Harkins 37'	QOSFC Report; BBC Sport Report; Honest Men Photos	Harvie (yellow card) 20' (yellow-red card) 79'	Attendance: 2,498; Referee: Steven; Man of the Match: Dobbie

15 September 2018 ScoChamp Match 5	Queen of the South	0–0	Ross County	Palmerston Park
15:00		QOSFC Report; BBC Sport Report; Staggies Photos		Attendance: 1,509; Referee: McLean; Man of the Match: Doyle

22 September 2018 ScoChamp Match 6	Partick Thistle	3–2	Queen of the South	Firhill Stadium
15:00	Doolan 32'; Spittal 38', 41'	QOSFC Report; BBC Sport Report; Harry Wraggs Photos	Dobbie 4'; Todd 34'	Attendance: 2,710; Referee: Beaton; Man of the Match: Todd

29 September 2018 ScoChamp Match 7	Inverness Caledonian Thistle	0–0	Queen of the South	Caledonian Stadium
15:00		QOSFC Report; BBC Sport Report; Caley Jags Photos		Attendance: 2,029; Referee: Muir; Man of the Match: Doyle

6 October 2018 ScoChamp Match 8	Queen of the South	3–3	Alloa Athletic	Palmerston Park
15:00	Dobbie 36', 43', 70'	QOSFC Report; BBC Sport Report; Wasps Photos	Flannigan 3'; Hastie 15'; Shields 25'	Attendance: 1,228; Referee: Munro; Man of the Match: Dobbie

20 October 2018 ScoChamp Match 9	Dunfermline Athletic	0–1	Queen of the South	East End Park
15:00		QOSFC Report; BBC Sport Report; Pars Photos	Todd 83'	Attendance: 4,443; Referee: Reid; Man of the Match: Martin

27 October 2018 ScoChamp Match 10	Queen of the South	2–0	Falkirk	Palmerston Park
15:00	Doyle 52'; Marshall 54'	QOSFC Report; BBC Sport Report; Bairns Photos		Attendance: 1,463; Referee: Steven; Man of the Match: Todd

30 October 2018 ScoChamp Match 11	Queen of the South	1–2	Greenock Morton	Palmerston Park
19:45	Dobbie 65'	QOSFC Report; BBC Sport Report; Ton Photos	McHugh 41'; Lyon 84'	Attendance: 1,174; Referee: Newlands; Man of the Match: Stirling

3 November 2018 ScoChamp Match 12	Dundee United	2–0	Queen of the South	Tannadice Park
15:00	Šafranko 3'; Doyle 81' (o.g.)	QOSFC Report; BBC Sport Report; Terrors Photos		Attendance: 5,171; Referee: Thomson; Man of the Match: Norman Jr.

10 November 2018 ScoChamp Match 13	Ayr United	1–1	Queen of the South	Somerset Park
15:00	Rose 75'	QOSFC Report; BBC Sport Report; Honest Men Photos	Murray 81'	Attendance: 2,539; Referee: Beaton; Man of the Match: Martin

17 November 2018 ScoChamp Match 14	Queen of the South	3–3	Inverness Caledonian Thistle	Palmerston Park
15:00	Dykes 31'; Dobbie 31'; Todd 61'	QOSFC Report; BBC Sport Report; Caley Jags Photos	McCart 71'; Austin 74'; Welsh 81' (pen.)	Attendance: 1,233; Referee: Aitken; Man of the Match: Stirling

1 December 2018 ScoChamp Match 15	Queen of the South	1–0	Partick Thistle	Palmerston Park
15:00	Dobbie 82'	QOSFC Report; BBC Sport Report; Harry Wraggs Photos		Attendance: 1,508; Referee: McLean; Man of the Match: Doyle

8 December 2018 ScoChamp Match 16	Ross County	1–1	Queen of the South	Victoria Park
15:00	Mullin 55'	QOSFC Report; BBC Sport Report; Staggies Photos	Stirling 71'	Attendance: 3,305; Referee: Roncone; Man of the Match: Martin

15 December 2018 ScoChamp Match 17	Queen of the South	0–0	Dunfermline Athletic	Palmerston Park
15:00		QOSFC Report; BBC Sport Report; Pars Photos		Attendance: 727; Referee: Kirkland; Man of the Match: Martin

22 December 2018 ScoChamp Match 18	Alloa Athletic	2–0	Queen of the South	Indodrill Stadium
15:00	Flannigan 63'; Zanatta 90+1'	QOSFC Report; BBC Sport Report; Wasps Photos		Attendance: 646; Referee: Muir; Man of the Match: Doyle

29 December 2018 ScoChamp Match 19	Queen of the South	1–1	Ayr United	Palmerston Park
15:00	Todd 29'	QOSFC Report; BBC Sport Report; Honest Men Photos	Moffat 41'	Attendance: 2,349; Referee: Newlands; Man of the Match: Semple

5 January 2019 ScoChamp Match 20	Inverness Caledonian Thistle	1–2	Queen of the South	Caledonian Stadium
15:00	Walsh 69'	QOSFC Report; BBC Sport Report; Caley Jags Photos	Mercer 83'; Dobbie 84'	Attendance: 2,225; Referee: Cook; Man of the Match: Low

12 January 2019 ScoChamp Match 21	Queen of the South	4–0	Ross County	Palmerston Park
15:00	Dobbie 12', 77'; Doyle 45'; Maguire 65'	QOSFC Report; BBC Sport Report; Staggies Photos	Mullin (red card) 68'	Attendance: 1,386; Referee: Reid; Man of the Match: Low

26 January 2019 ScoChamp Match 22	Partick Thistle	2–1	Queen of the South	Firhill Stadium
15:00	Cardle 18'; Storey 54'	QOSFC Report; BBC Sport Report; Harry Wraggs Photos	Dobbie 80' (pen.)	Attendance: 2,662; Referee: Steven; Man of the Match: Stirling

2 February 2019 ScoChamp Match 23	Falkirk	3–0	Queen of the South	Falkirk Stadium
15:00	Keillor-Dunn 8' (yellow card) 71' (yellow-red card) 72'; Edjenguele 64'; Petravicius 77'	QOSFC Report; BBC Sport Report; Bairns Photos		Attendance: 4,538; Referee: Duncan; Man of the Match: Marshall

16 February 2019 ScoChamp Match 24	Queen of the South	0–1	Dundee United	Palmerston Park
15:00	Maguire (red card) 40'	QOSFC Report; BBC Sport Report; Terrors Photos	Clark 40' (pen.)	Attendance: 2,012; Referee: Dallas; Man of the Match: Mercer

23 February 2019 ScoChamp Match 25	Queen of the South	1–2	Alloa Athletic	Palmerston Park
15:00	Jacobs 59'	QOSFC Report; BBC Sport Report; Wasps Photos	Graham 18'; Kirkpatrick 90+3'	Attendance: 1,116; Referee: Newlands; Man of the Match: Jacobs

26 February 2019 ScoChamp Match 26	Greenock Morton	1–0	Queen of the South	Cappielow Park
19:45	Buchanan 85'	QOSFC Report; BBC Sport Report; Ton Photos		Attendance: 1,324; Referee: Lowe; Man of the Match: Wilson

2 March 2019 ScoChamp Match 27	Dunfermline Athletic	1–0	Queen of the South	East End Park
15:00	Blair 74'	QOSFC Report; BBC Sport Report; Pars Photos		Attendance: 4,708; Referee: Duncan; Man of the Match: Marshall

9 March 2019 ScoChamp Match 28	Queen of the South	0–2	Inverness Caledonian Thistle	Palmerston Park
15:00		QOSFC Report; BBC Sport Report; Caley Jags Photos	Doran 7'; McKay 20'	Attendance: 1,066; Referee: Munro; Man of the Match: Dykes

16 March 2019 ScoChamp	Ayr United	P – P	Queen of the South	Somerset Park
15:00		BBC Sport News
Note: Postponed due to waterlogged pitch

30 March 2019 ScoChamp Match 29	Dundee United	1–2	Queen of the South	Tannadice Park
15:00	Clark 71'	QOSFC Report; BBC Sport Report; Terrors Photos	Dobbie 52' (pen.); Dykes 57'	Attendance: 4,839; Referee: Muir; Man of the Match: Leighfield

2 April 2019 ScoChamp Match 30	Queen of the South	1–1	Falkirk	Palmerston Park
19:45	Dobbie 90+6' (pen.)	QOSFC Report; BBC Sport Report; Bairns Photos	Keillor-Dunn 90+2' (pen.) (yellow card) 81' (yellow-red card) 90+4'	Attendance: 1,508; Referee: Cook; Man of the Match: Stirling

6 April 2019 ScoChamp Match 31	Queen of the South	1–1	Greenock Morton	Palmerston Park
15:00	Jacobs 42'	QOSFC Report; BBC Sport Report; Ton Photos	Telfer 64'	Attendance: 1,442; Referee: D Robertson; Man of the Match: Wilson

9 April 2019 ScoChamp Match 32	Ayr United	1–0	Queen of the South	Somerset Park
19:45	Shankland 43' (pen.)	QOSFC Report; BBC Sport Report; Honest Men Photos		Attendance: 1,582; Referee: Aitken; Man of the Match: Doyle

13 April 2019 ScoChamp Match 33	Alloa Athletic	1–0	Queen of the South	Indodrill Stadium
15:00	Hetherington 73'	QOSFC Report; BBC Sport Report; Wasps Photos		Attendance: 1,086; Referee: Clancy; Man of the Match: Wilson

20 April 2019 ScoChamp Match 34	Queen of the South	2–1	Dunfermline Athletic	Palmerston Park
15:00	Wilson 44'; Todd 52'	QOSFC Report; BBC Sport Report; Pars Photos	J. Longridge 90+5'	Attendance: 1,704; Referee: Reid; Man of the Match: Wilson

26 April 2019 ScoChamp Match 35	Ross County	4–0	Queen of the South	Victoria Park
19:05	Stewart 29'; Graham 51', 81'; Mullin 54'	QOSFC Report; BBC Sport Report; Staggies Photos		Attendance: 4,805; Referee: Beaton; Man of the Match: Marshall

4 May 2019 ScoChamp Match 36	Queen of the South	0–3	Partick Thistle	Palmerston Park
15:00		QOSFC Report; BBC Sport Report; Harry Wraggs Photos	Mansell 14'; McDonald 44'; Bannigan 73' (pen.)	Attendance: 3,916; Referee: Dallas; Man of the Match: Marshall

=== Championship play-offs ===
7 May 2019 Semi Final 1st Leg	Montrose	2–1	Queen of the South	Links Park
19:45	R. Campbell 43', 69'	QOSFC Report; BBC Sport Report; Gable Endies Photos	Murray 68'	Attendance: 1,124; Referee: McKendrick; Man of the Match: Marshall

11 May 2019 Semi Final 2nd Leg	Queen of the South	5–0 (6–2 agg.)	Montrose	Palmerston Park
15:00	Dobbie 11', 28', 40'; Dykes 23'; Doyle 32'	QOSFC Report; BBC Sport Report; Gable Endies Photos		Attendance: 2,001; Referee: Aitken; Man of the Match: Dobbie

15 May 2019 Final 1st Leg	Raith Rovers	1–3	Queen of the South	Stark's Park
19:45	McKay 86'	QOSFC Report; BBC Sport Report; Rovers Photos	Dykes 17'; C. Murray 22'; E. Murray 75' (o.g.)	Attendance: 2,471; Referee: Munro; Man of the Match: Dykes

18 May 2019 Final 2nd Leg	Queen of the South	0–0 (3–1 agg.)	Raith Rovers	Palmerston Park
16:05		QOSFC Report; BBC Sport Report; Rovers Photos		Attendance: 2,420; Referee: Walsh; Man of the Match: Murray

=== Scottish Challenge Cup ===
14 August 2018 Round 1	Stenhousemuir	0–3	Queen of the South	Ochilview Park
19:30		QOSFC Report; BBC Sport Report; Warriors Photos	Dobbie 59', 66'; Dykes 62'	Attendance: 387; Referee: Graham; Man of the Match: Dobbie

8 September 2018 Round 2	Queen of the South	4–3	Crusaders	Palmerston Park
14:30	Dobbie 22', 31'; Dykes 25'; Harkins 29'	QOSFC Report; BBC Sport Report; Hatchetmen Photos	Patterson 47', 51' (pen.); Heatley 85'	Attendance: 1,204; Referee: MacGraith: Ireland FA; Man of the Match: Dobbie

13 October 2018 Round 3	East Fife	2–0	Queen of the South	Bayview Stadium
15:00	K. Smith 34'; Dowds 78'	QOSFC Report; BBC Sport Report; Fifers Photos		Attendance: 579; Referee: Cook; Man of the Match: Doyle

=== Scottish League Cup ===
14 July 2018 Round 1;Group G-1	Queen of the South	5–3	Stranraer	Palmerston Park
15:00	Harkins 41'; Dobbie 42', 87'; Dykes 45'; Stirling 64'	QOSFC Report; BBC Sport Report; Blues Photos	McGowan 4'; Donnelly 9'; Turner 80'	Attendance: 803; Referee: Beaton; Man of the Match: Dykes

17 July 2018 Round 1;Group G-2	Queen of the South	3–0	Clyde	Palmerston Park
19:45	Dobbie 47', 49', 78'	QOSFC Report; BBC Sport Report; Bully Wee Photos		Attendance: 788; Referee: Munro; Man of the Match: Dobbie

21 July 2018 Round 1;Group G-3	Edinburgh City	0–4	Queen of the South	Ainslie Park
15:00		QOSFC Report; BBC Sport Report; Citizens Photos	Dykes 24'; Dobbie 26', 38'; Todd 34'	Attendance: 525; Referee: Napier; Man of the Match: Todd

24 July 2018 Round 1;Group G-4	Motherwell	2–0	Queen of the South	Fir Park
19:45	Sammon 12', 37'	QOSFC Report; BBC Sport Report; SPFL Report; Well Photos		Attendance: 3,337; Referee: D Robertson; Man of the Match: Doyle

18 August 2018 Round 2	Queen of the South	2 – 4 (a.e.t.)	St Johnstone	Palmerston Park
15:00	Dykes 45+1'; Dobbie 116' (pen.)	QOSFC Report; BBC Sport Report; Saints Photos	Watt 27', 105'; Wright 95'; Hendry 120+1'	Attendance: 1,652; Referee: D Robertson; Man of the Match: Stirling

=== Scottish Cup ===
24 November 2018 Round 3	Queen of the South	4–1	Formartine United	Palmerston Park
15:00	Dobbie 2', 8'; Dykes 42'; Mercer 67'	QOSFC Report; BBC Sport Report; United Photos	Wood 28'	Attendance: 931; Referee: Ross; Man of the Match: Dobbie

19 January 2019 Round 4	Dundee	1–1	Queen of the South	Dens Park
15:00	Curran 45'	QOSFC Report; BBC Sport Report; Dee Photos	Dobbie 28'	Attendance: 2,728; Referee: Clancy; Man of the Match: Todd

29 January 2019 Round 4 Replay	Queen of the South	3–0	Dundee	Palmerston Park
19:45	Dobbie 12', 27', 74'	QOSFC Report; BBC Sport Report; Dee Photos		Attendance: 1,421; Referee: McLean; Man of the Match: Dobbie

10 February 2019 Round 5	Aberdeen	4–1	Queen of the South	Pittodrie Stadium
15:30	McGinn 47'; Considine 63'; Cosgrove 67', 73' (pen.)	QOSFC Report; BBC Sport Report; Dons Photos	Dobbie 50'	Attendance: 7,857; Referee: Anderson; Man of the Match: Doyle

== Player statistics ==
=== Captains ===
No.	P	Name	Country	No. games	Notes
11	FW	Stephen Dobbie	(Scotland)	44	Club Captain
4	DF	Callum Fordyce	(Scotland)	4	Vice Captain
8	MF	Kyle Jacobs	(South Africa)	4	Vice Captain

Last updated: 18 May 2019
Source: Competitive match reports.
Competitive matches only
Matches started as captain only
Country: FIFA nationality; No.: Squad number; P: Position; Name: Player name; No. Games: Number of games started as captain.

=== Squad ===
Last updated 18 May 2019

No.	Pos	Nat	Player	Total		Scottish Championship		Other ^{[a]}		League Cup		Scottish Cup	
No.	Pos	Nat	Player	Apps	Goals	Apps	Goals	Apps	Goals	Apps	Goals	Apps	Goals
1	GK	(Scotland) SCO	Alan Martin	40	0	27+0	0	6+0	0	4+0	0	3+0	0
2	DF	(Scotland) SCO	Scott Mercer	47	2	32+0	1	6+0	0	5+0	0	4+0	1
3	DF	(England) ENG	Jordan Marshall	51	1	35+0	1	7+0	0	5+0	0	4+0	0
4	DF	(Scotland) SCO	Callum Fordyce	33	0	20+3	0	1+1	0	5+0	0	3+0	0
5	DF	(Scotland) SCO	Darren Brownlie	11	0	4+3	0	4+0	0	0+0	0	0+0	0
6	DF	(Scotland) SCO	Michael Doyle	51	3	35+0	2	7+0	1	5+0	0	4+0	0
7	MF	(Scotland) SCO	Andy Stirling	50	2	29+6	1	3+3	0	4+1	1	4+0	0
8	MF	(South Africa) RSA	Kyle Jacobs	51	2	36+0	2	7+0	0	3+1	0	4+0	0
9	MF	(Canada) CAN	Fraser Aird	9	0	3+3	0	1+1	0	0+0	0	0+1	0
10	MF	(England) ENG	Josh Todd	42	7	30+0	6	6+0	0	2+2	1	2+0	0
11	FW	(Scotland) SCO	Stephen Dobbie	45	43	30+0	21	5+1	7	5+0	8	4+0	7
*12	DF	(England) ENG	Callum Semple	27	1	15+3	1	3+0	0	4+1	0	0+1	0
12	MF	(United States) USA	Ian McGrath	14	0	2+9	0	0+2	0	0+0	0	0+1	0
13	GK	(Turkey) TUR	Deniz Mehmet	2	0	2+0	0	0+0	0	0+0	0	0+0	0
*14	MF	(Scotland) SCO	Gary Harkins	20	3	12+1	1	1+1	1	5+0	1	0+0	0
14	MF	(Scotland) SCO	Nicky Low	10	0	5+2	0	0+0	0	0+0	0	3+0	0
15	DF	(England) ENG	Charlie Exley	0	0	0+0	0	0+0	0	0+0	0	0+0	0
16	MF	(Scotland) SCO	Dean Watson	3	0	0+2	0	0+0	0	0+1	0	0+0	0
17	FW	(Scotland) SCO	Connor Murray	32	3	3+18	1	4+1	2	0+3	0	0+3	0
18	FW	(Scotland) SCO	Declan Tremble	3	0	0+1	0	1+0	0	0+1	0	0+0	0
19	MF	(Scotland) SCO	Owen Bell	19	0	1+8	0	1+1	0	2+3	0	0+3	0
20	GK	(Scotland) SCO	Jack Leighfield	11	0	7+1	0	1+0	0	1+0	0	1+0	0
*21	MF	(Scotland) SCO	Adam Frizzell	13	0	2+9	0	1+1	0	0+0	0	0+0	0
21	MF	(Scotland) SCO	Iain Wilson	18	1	11+3	1	4+0	0	0+0	0	0+0	0
22	MF	(Canada) CAN	David Norman Jr.	12	0	6+4	0	0+1	0	0+0	0	1+0	0
23	DF	(Scotland) SCO	Ewan Gourlay	0	0	0+0	0	0+0	0	0+0	0	0+0	0
24	DF	(England) ENG	Daniel Harvey	1	0	0+0	0	0+1	0	0+0	0	0+0	0
25	FW	(Australia) AUS	Lyndon Dykes	52	10	36+0	2	7+0	4	5+0	3	4+0	1
26	MF	(England) ENG	Robbie Ivison	2	0	0+2	0	0+0	0	0+0	0	0+0	0
27	MF	(Scotland) SCO	Daniel Irving	0	0	0+0	0	0+0	0	0+0	0	0+0	0
28	FW	(Scotland) SCO	Ross Irving	0	0	0+0	0	0+0	0	0+0	0	0+0	0
29	MF	(England) ENG	Callum Williams	0	0	0+0	0	0+0	0	0+0	0	0+0	0
*30	GK	(Scotland) SCO	Sam Henderson	0	0	0+0	0	0+0	0	0+0	0	0+0	0
30	DF	(Scotland) SCO	Barry Maguire	20	1	13+2	1	1+1	0	0+0	0	3+0	0
31	GK	(Scotland) SCO	Ryan Gibson	0	0	0+0	0	0+0	0	0+0	0	0+0	0

a. Includes other competitive competitions, including the play-offs and the Challenge Cup.

=== Disciplinary record ===
As of 18 May 2019 (UTC)

Number	Nation	Position	Name	Scottish Championship		Other		League Cup		Scottish Cup		Total	
Number	Nation	Position	Name	Yellow card	Red card	Yellow card	Red card	Yellow card	Red card	Yellow card	Red card	Yellow card	Red card
2	(Scotland)	DF	Scott Mercer	4	0	0	0	1	0	0	0	5	0
3	(England)	DF	Jordan Marshall	3	0	0	0	1	0	0	0	4	0
4	(Scotland)	DF	Callum Fordyce	1	0	0	0	0	0	0	0	1	0
5	(Scotland)	DF	Darren Brownlie	1	0	0	0	0	0	0	0	1	0
6	(Scotland)	DF	Michael Doyle	7	0	0	0	0	0	1	0	8	0
7	(Scotland)	MF	Andy Stirling	4	0	1	0	0	0	1	0	6	0
8	(South Africa)	MF	Kyle Jacobs	7	0	0	0	0	0	0	0	7	0
9	(Canada)	MF	Fraser Aird	1	0	0	0	0	0	0	0	1	0
10	(England)	MF	Josh Todd	3	0	0	0	0	0	0	0	3	0
12	(England)	DF	Callum Semple	4	0	1	0	1	0	0	0	6	0
14	(Scotland)	MF	Gary Harkins	2	0	0	0	1	0	0	0	3	0
14	(Scotland)	MF	Nicky Low	1	0	0	0	0	0	1	0	2	0
17	(Scotland)	FW	Connor Murray	1	0	0	0	0	0	0	0	1	0
19	(Scotland)	MF	Owen Bell	0	0	0	0	1	0	0	0	1	0
21	(Scotland)	MF	Adam Frizzell	1	0	0	0	0	0	0	0	1	0
21	(Scotland)	MF	Iain Wilson	4	0	0	0	0	0	0	0	4	0
22	(Canada)	MF	David Norman Jr.	3	0	0	0	0	0	0	0	3	0
25	(Australia)	FW	Lyndon Dykes	10	0	0	0	1	0	0	0	11	0
30	(Scotland)	DF	Barry Maguire	1	1	0	0	0	0	0	0	1	1
Totals				58	1	2	0	6	0	3	0	69	1

=== Top scorers ===
Last updated 18 May 2019

Position	Nation	Name	Scottish Championship	Other	League Cup	Scottish Cup	Total
1	(Scotland)	Stephen Dobbie	21	7	8	7	43
2	(Australia)	Lyndon Dykes	2	4	3	1	10
3	(England)	Josh Todd	6	0	1	0	7
4	(Scotland)	Gary Harkins	1	1	1	0	3
=	(Scotland)	Michael Doyle	2	1	0	0	3
=	(Scotland)	Connor Murray	1	2	0	0	3
7	(Scotland)	Andy Stirling	1	0	1	0	2
=	(Scotland)	Scott Mercer	1	0	0	1	2
=	(South Africa)	Kyle Jacobs	2	0	0	0	2
10	(England)	Callum Semple	1	0	0	0	1
=	(England)	Jordan Marshall	1	0	0	0	1
=	(Scotland)	Barry Maguire	1	0	0	0	1
=	(Scotland)	Iain Wilson	1	0	0	0	1

=== Clean sheets ===
R	Pos	Nat	Name	Scottish Championship	Other	League Cup	Scottish Cup	Total
1	GK	(Scotland)	Alan Martin	9	2	2	1	14
13	GK	(Turkey)	Deniz Mehmet	0	0	0	0	0
20	GK	(Scotland)	Jack Leighfield	0	1	0	0	1
			Totals	9	3	2	1	15

Last updated: 18 May 2019
Source: Match reports in Competitive matches

== Team statistics ==
=== League table ===
Pos	Team	Pld	W	D	L	GF	GA	GD	Pts	Promotion, qualification or relegation
6	Partick Thistle	36	12	7	17	43	52	−9	43	
7	Dunfermline Athletic	36	11	8	17	33	40	−7	41	
8	Alloa Athletic	36	10	9	17	39	53	−14	39	
9	Queen of the South (O)	36	9	11	16	41	48	−7	38	Qualification for the Championship play-offs
10	Falkirk (R)	36	9	11	16	37	49	−12	38	Relegation to League One

Source: SPFL
Rules for classification: 1) Points; 2) Goal difference; 3) Goals scored; 4) Points in head-to-head matches; 5) Goal difference in hth matches; 6). Goals scored in hth matches; 7). Play-off (only for deciding promotion, play-off participation and relegation).
(O) Play-off winners; (R) Relegated

=== League Cup table ===
Pos	Team	Pld	W	PW	PL	L	GF	GA	GD	Pts	Qualification	MOT	QOS	EDC	CLY	STR
1	Motherwell (Q)	4	3	0	1	0	11	2	+9	10	Qualification for the Second round	—	2–0	5–0	—	—
2	Queen of the South (Q)	4	3	0	0	1	12	5	+7	9	Qualification for the Second round	—	—	—	3–0	5–3
3	Edinburgh City	4	1	1	0	2	5	12	−7	5		—	0–4	—	—	4–2
4	Clyde	4	1	0	1	2	5	8	−3	4		1–3	—	1–1p	—	—
5	Stranraer	4	0	1	0	3	7	13	−6	2		p1–1	—	—	1–3	—

Rules for classification: 1) goal difference, 2) goals scored, 3) away goals scored, 4) matches won, 5) away matches won, 6) drawing of lots.
(Q) Qualified to the phase indicated

=== Division summary ===
Round	1	2	3	4	5	6	7	8	9	10	11	12	13	14	15	16	17	18	19	20	21	22	23	24	25	26	27	28	29	30	31	32	33	34	35	36
Ground	A	H	A	H	H	A	A	H	A	H	H	A	A	H	H	A	H	A	H	A	H	A	A	H	H	A	A	H	A	H	H	A	A	H	A	H
Result	D	L	W	W	D	L	D	D	W	W	L	L	D	D	W	D	D	L	D	W	W	L	L	L	L	L	L	L	W	D	D	L	L	W	L	L
Position	6	8	6	3	4	7	5	6	5	4	5	6	6	6	5	4	4	5	6	5	4	5	5	5	6	7	7	7	7	7	7	7	8	8	8	9

Updated to match(es) played on 4 May 2019. Source:
A = Away; H = Home; W = Win; D = Draw; L = Loss

=== Management statistics ===
Last updated 18 May 2019

Name	From	To	P	W	D	L	Win% (Note: Win% is the percentage of matches won rounded to two decimal places.)
Gary Naysmith	14 July 2018	4 May 2019	48	16	12	20	33.33
Allan Johnston	5 May 2019	18 May 2019	4	2	1	1	50.00

== Transfers ==
=== Players in ===
Player	From	Fee
(England) Josh Todd	(Scotland) St Mirren	Free
(Scotland) Gary Harkins	(Scotland) Greenock Morton	Free
(Scotland) Dean Watson	(England) Carlisle United	Free
(England) Charlie Exley	(England) Newcastle United	Free
(England) Callum Semple	(England) Sheffield United	Loan
(Scotland) Michael Doyle	(Scotland) Greenock Morton	Free
(Scotland) Adam Frizzell	(Scotland) Kilmarnock	Loan
(Canada) David Norman Jr.	(Canada) Vancouver Whitecaps	Loan
(Scotland) Nicky Low	(Northern Ireland) Derry City	Free
(Scotland) Barry Maguire	(Scotland) Motherwell	Loan
(Scotland) Iain Wilson	(Scotland) Kilmarnock	Loan
(Australia) Lyndon Dykes	(Scotland) Queen of the South	Loan
(Canada) Fraser Aird	(Scotland) Dundee United	Loan
(United States) Ian McGrath	(United States) Nashville SC	Free
(Turkey) Deniz Mehmet	(Scotland) Dundee United	Free

=== Players out ===
Player	To	Fee
(Scotland) Shaun Rooney	(Scotland) Inverness Caledonian Thistle	Free
(Scotland) John Rankin	(Scotland) Clyde	Free
(Scotland) Derek Lyle	(Scotland) Peterhead	Free
(Scotland) Dan Carmichael	(Scotland) Cumnock Juniors	Free
(England) Jesse Akubuine	(Scotland) Cumbernauld Colts	Free
(Scotland) Ross Fergusson	(Scotland) Annan Athletic	Free
(Scotland) Sam Henderson	Free Agent	Free
(Scotland) Declan Tremble	(Scotland) Abbey Vale	Loan
(England) Charlie Exley	(Scotland) Gretna 2008	Loan
(Scotland) Dean Watson	(Scotland) Gretna 2008	Loan
(Scotland) Gary Harkins	(Scotland) Partick Thistle	Free
(Australia) Lyndon Dykes	(Scotland) Livingston	Free
(Scotland) Owen Bell	(Scotland) East Kilbride	Loan
(England) Josh Todd	(Scotland) Dundee	Free

== See also ==
- List of Queen of the South F.C. seasons
