= Brotherston =

Brotherston is a surname. Notable people with the surname include:

- Dean Brotherston (born 1997), Scottish footballer
- Lez Brotherston (born 1961), British set and costume designer
- Noel Brotherston (1956–1995), Northern Irish footballer

== See also ==
- Brotherton
