= Mark Shankland =

Scottish footballer

Personal information
- Date of birth: 11 July 1995 (age 31)
- Place of birth: Mauchline, Scotland
- Position: Forward

Team information
- Current team: Mauchline AFC

Youth career
- –2012: Ayr United

Senior career*
Years	Team	Apps	(Gls)
2011–2014	Ayr United	27	(0)
2013	→ Albion Rovers (loan)	3	(1)
2014–2023	Auchinleck Talbot		
2023-2024	Troon		

International career
2012	Scotland U17	1	(0)
- * Club domestic league appearances and goals as of 15:14, 9 September 2023 (UTC)

Mark Shankland is a Scottish footballer who plays as a forward for Troon. He began his career in the senior leagues with Ayr United.

== Club career ==
In the final Scottish Second Division match of the 2010–11 season, Shankland came off the bench to become the youngest-ever player for Ayr United at just 15 years and 300 days old, the record was previously held by Stewart Kean at 17 years and 56 days. By then he had already been on trial at Liverpool and subsequently also spent time at Burnley and Birmingham City, but no offer from England materialised after Ayr requested a development fee from interested clubs.

At the start of the 2012–13 season, Shankland broke another record held by Kean, becoming the youngest goalscorer at 17 years and 17 days old, in a 3–1 away defeat at East Stirlingshire in the Challenge Cup. (that record was broken by Alan Forrest the following season).

In 2013, Shankland joined League Two side Albion Rovers on loan. He scored in the final minute of his debut for Rovers.

Shankland left Ayr at the end of the 2013–14 season after turning down a new contract; however, the club held on to his registration, meaning he could not sign for a SPFL club without Ayr being owed a fee, and could only play on amateur terms – a situation which did not change until the player turned 23 in July 2018.

On 13 October 2014, Shankland signed for Junior club Auchinleck Talbot. He went on to win several trophies with the East Ayrshire side including two West Region League titles and two Scottish Junior Cups, and was still playing with them in January 2019 when they secured an unexpected 1–0 victory over his former club Ayr United in the fourth round of the 2018–19 Scottish Cup; Shankland came off the bench in what was the first win for Bot over a professional club and the furthest they had advanced in the competition. He provided the cross for the goal headed in by another former Ayr player Craig McCracken, just as the two had combined for a last-minute goal to win the 2017–18 Scottish Junior Cup for Auchinleck the previous year.

== International career ==
In February 2012, Shankland was called into Ricky Sbragia's Scotland Under-17 side for the match against Serbia at Somerset Park.

== Personal life ==
Shankland was raised in the Ayrshire town of Mauchline and as a child supported Auchinleck Talbot, a team for which his father Kevin Biggart also played. His elder brother Stephen is an amateur footballer who won the Scottish Amateur Cup with Shortlees in 2018. They are not related to Lawrence Shankland who also played for Ayr United.
