= 2018–19 Scottish Cup =

2018–19 William Hill Scottish Cup
Tournament details
- Country: Scotland
- Teams: 95

Final positions
- Champions: Celtic
- Runners-up: Heart of Midlothian

Tournament statistics
- Matches played: 105
- Goals scored: 350 (3.33 per match)
- Top goal scorer: Stephen Dobbie (7 goals)
- All statistics correct as of 25 May 2019.

The 2018–19 Scottish Cup was the 134th season of Scotland's most prestigious football knockout competition. The tournament was sponsored by bookmaker William Hill in what was the eighth season of a nine-year partnership, after contract negotiations saw the initial five-year contract extended for an additional four years in October 2015.

The cup was won for the third consecutive occasion, and a record 39th in total, by the defending champions, Celtic who had won the 2018 Scottish Cup Final on 19 May 2018.

== Calendar ==
The calendar for the 2018–19 Scottish Cup, as announced by Scottish Football Association.

Round	Main date	Number of fixtures	Clubs	New Entries
Preliminary Round 1	11 August 2018	7	95 → 88	19
Preliminary Round 2	1 September 2018	6	88 → 82	None
First Round	22 September 2018	18	82 → 64	30
Second Round	20 October 2018	16	64 → 48	14
Third Round	24 November 2018	16	48 → 32	16
Fourth Round	19 January 2019	16	32 → 16	16
Fifth Round	9 February 2019	8	16 → 8	None
Quarter-Finals	2 March 2019	4	8 → 4	None
Semi-Finals	13–14 April 2019	2	4 → 2	None
Final	25 May 2019	1	2 → 1	None

== Preliminary rounds ==
=== Draw ===
The draw for the preliminary rounds took place on Monday, 16 July 2018 at Hampden Park and was made by Scottish National Team Head Coaches Alex McLeish and Shelley Kerr.

19 clubs were involved in the draw, of which five received a bye to the second preliminary round, while the other 14 entered the first preliminary round. The teams competing in these rounds were made up of teams from the East of Scotland Football League (8), South of Scotland Football League (4), North Caledonian Football League (1), Scottish Junior Football Association (4) and the Scottish Amateur Football Association (2). Shortlees and Tynecastle took part in the Scottish Cup for the first time after winning the 2017–18 Scottish Amateur Cup and the 2017–18 South & East Cup-Winners Shield respectively.

There were three parts to the draw. The first part determined which five clubs, from the 14 eligible, received a bye to the second preliminary round. The clubs which did not receive a bye into the second preliminary round entered the first preliminary round. Seven ties were then drawn in the first preliminary round to be played on Saturday, 11 August 2018. The final part of the draw saw six ties drawn in the second preliminary round to be played on Saturday, 1 September 2018.

Clubs with a valid Club Licence at the date of the draw were eligible for a bye to the second preliminary round. Teams in Bold advanced to the first round.

Clubs eligible for a bye	Clubs participating in the first preliminary round draw
1. Banks O’Dee; 2. **Burntisland Shipyard**; 3. **Coldstream**; 4. Girvan; 5. Glasgow University; 6. Golspie Sutherland; 7. Hawick Royal Albert; 8. **Linlithgow Rose**; 9. Lothian Thistle Hutchison Vale; 10. Newton Stewart; 11. Preston Athletic; 12. St Cuthbert Wanderers; 13. Threave Rovers; 14. Wigtown & Bladnoch	15. **Auchinleck Talbot** ^{(2017–18 Junior Cup winners)}; 16. **Beith** ^{(2017–18 West Super League winners)}; 17. **Bonnyrigg Rose** ^{(2017–18 East Superleague winners)}; 18. Shortlees ^{(2017–18 Scottish Amateur Cup winners)}; 19. Tynecastle ^{(2017–18 South & East Cup-Winners Shield)}

=== Preliminary round one ===
Girvan, Linlithgow Rose, Lothian Thistle Hutchison Vale, Newton Stewart, and Wigtown & Bladnoch received a bye to preliminary round two.

==== Matches ====
11 August 2018	Hawick Royal Albert	**0–5**	**Bonnyrigg Rose**	Hawick
15:00		Report	Currie 39', 55'; Turner 44'; Thomson 83'; Wilson 85'	Stadium: Albert Park; Referee: Connor Ashwood

11 August 2018	Golspie Sutherland	**1–4**	**Burntisland Shipyard**	Golspie
15:00	Coghill 87'	Report	Jordan Galloway 30', 45'; Kinnaird 39'; Brown 73'	Stadium: King George V Park; Referee: Duncan Nicolson

11 August 2018	**Auchinleck Talbot**	**3–1**	Banks O' Dee	Auchinleck
15:00	Kemp 7'; G. Wilson 38'; Shankland 47'	Report	Henderson 6'	Stadium: Beechwood Park; Referee: Alastair Grieve

11 August 2018	**Coldstream**	**4–2**	St Cuthbert Wanderers	Coldstream
15:00	Briggs 7', 23', 33' (pen.); Harbottle 59'	Report	Miller 59', 90' (pen.)	Stadium: Home Park; Attendance: 156; Referee: Jordan Curran

11 August 2018	**Preston Athletic**	**3–1**	Glasgow University	Prestonpans
15:00	Turkington 3'; Jardine 32'; Archibald 46'	Report	Wilson 73'	Stadium: Pennypit Park; Referee: Ryan Oliver

11 August 2018	Threave Rovers	**0–3**	**Beith**	Castle Douglas
15:00		Report	Collins 12'; Haggarty 74'; Docherty 89'	Stadium: Meadow Park; Referee: Euan Birch

12 August 2018	Tynecastle	**0–2**	**Shortlees**	Edinburgh
15:00		Report	Knapp 63'; Grant 65' (o.g.)	Stadium: Meggetland Sports Complex; Referee: Chris Gentles

=== Preliminary round two ===
==== Matches ====
1 September 2018	Preston Athletic	**0–2**	**Linlithgow Rose**	Prestonpans
14:30		Report	Coyne 13', 43'	Stadium: Pennypit Park; Referee: Kyle Hall

1 September 2018	Girvan	**0–1**	**Burntisland Shipyard**	Girvan
15:00		Report	Jordan Galloway 55'	Stadium: Hamilton Park; Referee: George Calder

1 September 2018	Newton Stewart	**0–3**	**Coldstream**	Newton Stewart
15:00		Report	Lee 8'; Harbottle 25'; Briggs 88'	Stadium: Blairmount Park; Referee: Colin Whyte

1 September 2018	**Auchinleck Talbot**	**10–0**	Wigtown & Bladnoch	Auchinleck
15:00	G. Wilson 12', 36'; Shankland 17', 54'; Dougan 28' (o.g.); White 40'; Kemp 45'; McIlroy 65', 87'; Hyslop 73'	Report		Stadium: Beechwood Park; Referee: Iain Snedden

1 September 2018	**Bonnyrigg Rose**	**3–0**	Shortlees	Bonnyrigg
15:00	Wilson 49', 53'; Brett 71'	Report		Stadium: New Dundas Park; Referee: Jordan Paterson

1 September 2018	**Beith**	**3–2**	Lothian Thistle Hutchison Vale	Beith
15:00	McGlinchey 30'; Bradley 46'; Milliken 90'	Report	McGregor 61'; Nhamburo 89'	Stadium: Bellsdale Park; Referee: Alex Shepherd

== First round ==
The first round took place on the weekend of 22 September 2018. Along with the six winners from the second preliminary round, there were 30 new entries at this stage - 16 from the Highland Football League and 14 from the Lowland Football League.

=== Draw ===
The draw for the first round took place on Saturday, 1 September 2018 at Hampden Park and was made by former Scottish Cup winner Robbie Neilson and boxer Charlie Flynn. Selkirk withdrew from the competition before the draw was made so one team received a bye to the second round.

Teams in Bold advanced to the second round.

Highland Football League	Lowland Football League	Other
**Brora Rangers**; Buckie Thistle; Clachnacuddin; **Deveronvale**; Forres Mechanics; Fort William; **Fraserburgh**; Huntly; Inverurie Loco Works; Keith; Lossiemouth; Nairn County; **Rothes**; Strathspey Thistle; Turriff United; Wick Academy	**BSC Glasgow**; **Civil Service Strollers**; **Cumbernauld Colts**; Dalbeattie Star; **East Stirlingshire**; Edinburgh University; **Edusport Academy**; **Gala Fairydean Rovers**; **Gretna 2008**; **Kelty Hearts**; **Stirling University**; Vale of Leithen; **Whitehill Welfare**	East of Scotland teams: Bonnyrigg Rose; Burntisland Shipyard; **Coldstream**; **Linlithgow Rose**; SJFA teams: **Auchinleck Talbot**; **Beith**

BSC Glasgow were drawn to receive a bye to the second round.

=== Matches ===
21 September 2018	Inverurie Loco Works	**3–4**	**Fraserburgh**	Inverurie
20:00	Angus 9'; Broadhurst 68'; Gauld 86'	Report	Campbell 4' (pen.), 6' (pen.); West 20'; Dickson 22'	Stadium: Harlaw Park; Referee: Stewart Luke

22 September 2018	**Brora Rangers**	**4–3**	Turriff United	Brora
15:00	MacLeod 28'; Campbell 62', 72'; Mackay 80'	Report	Smith 49'; Ross 59'; Taylor 64'	Stadium: Dudgeon Park; Referee: Chris McNab

22 September 2018	**Gala Fairydean Rovers**	**6–0**	Lossiemouth	Galashiels
15:00	Paton 8', 12', 75'; Paterson 39'; McKirdy 76'; Baxter 90'	Report		Stadium: Netherdale; Referee: Alistair Grieve

22 September 2018	**Edusport Academy**	**3–1**	Buckie Thistle	Annan
15:00	McLaughlin 7', 19', 23'	Report	Ross 74'	Stadium: Galabank; Referee: Jordan Curran

22 September 2018	Nairn County	**1–3**	**Beith**	Nairn
15:00	Main 51'	Report	Christie 38', 85'; McGlinchey 46'	Stadium: Station Park; Referee: Craig Wilson

22 September 2018	Forres Mechanics	**2–2**	Civil Service Strollers	Forres
15:00	Pollock 41', 68'	Report	Laird 16'; Churchill 89'	Stadium: Mosset Park; Referee: Connor Ashwood

22 September 2018	Burntisland Shipyard	**1–4**	**Cumbernauld Colts**	Burntisland
15:00	R. Brown 44'	Report	Team 12'; S. Brown 61', 77'; O'Neill 86'	Stadium: Recreation Park; Referee: Ryan Oliver

22 September 2018	**Linlithgow Rose**	**3–0**	Fort William	Linlithgow
15:00	Coyne 62'; Sloan 87'; Turnbull 89'	Report		Stadium: Prestonfield; Referee: Jordan Paterson

22 September 2018	**Gretna 2008**	**3–2**	Vale of Leithen	Gretna
15:00	Grandison 28'; Kelly 37', 71'	Report	Stewart 16'; Bonnar 46'	Stadium: Raydale Park; Referee: Colin Whyte

22 September 2018	Dalbeattie Star	**0–0**	Kelty Hearts	Dalbeattie
15:00		Report		Stadium: Islecroft Stadium; Referee: Chris Gentles

22 September 2018	**Rothes**	**4–0**	Clachnacuddin	Rothes
15:00	Wilson 2', 88'; Stark 47'; Davidson 60'	Report		Stadium: Mackessack Park; Referee: Darren Munro

22 September 2018	**Whitehill Welfare**	**1–0**	Edinburgh University	Rosewell
15:00	Keane 52'	Report		Stadium: Ferguson Park; Referee: Dan McFarlane

22 September 2018	Wick Academy	**1–2**	**Auchinleck Talbot**	Wick
15:00	Halliday 54'	Report	Glasgow 38'; S. Wilson 57'	Stadium: Harmsworth Park; Referee: Alex Shepherd

22 September 2018	Strathspey Thistle	**0–2**	**Coldstream**	Grantown-on-Spey
15:00		Report	Briggs 27', 80'	Stadium: Seafield Park; Referee: Harry Bruce

22 September 2018	**Deveronvale**	**2–1**	Bonnyrigg Rose	Banff
15:00	Noble 11'; Robertson 20'	Report	Wilson 23'	Stadium: Princess Royal Park; Referee: Matthew MacDermid

22 September 2018	Huntly	**1–4**	**East Stirlingshire**	Huntly
15:00	Jack 35'	Report	Ramsay 26'; Rodgers 50'; Allum 61', 75'	Stadium: Christie Park; Referee: William Wilson

23 September 2018	**Stirling University**	**2–1**	Keith	Stirling
15:00	Lyons 20'; Hall 26'	Report	Keith 75'	Stadium: Forthbank Stadium; Referee: George Calder

=== Replays ===
29 September 2018	**Civil Service Strollers**	**2–1**	Forres Mechanics	Edinburgh
15:00	Faye 65'; Froude 79'	Report	Wilson 81'	Stadium: Christie Gillies Park; Referee: Connor Ashwood

29 September 2018	**Kelty Hearts**	**3–1**	Dalbeattie Star	Kelty
15:00	Cargill 3'; Ritchie 43'; Husband 45'	Report	Todd 82'	Stadium: New Central Park; Referee: Chris Gentles

== Second round ==
The second round took place on the weekend of 20 October 2018. Along with the 17 winners and one bye from the first round, there were 14 new entries at this stage - two each from the Highland Football League and the Lowland Football League and all 10 from League Two.

=== Draw ===
The draw for the second round took place at Hampden Park on 22 September 2018. The draw was made by Olympic bronze medallist Eve Muirhead and Kilmarnock's Scottish Cup winning captain Ray Montgomerie.

Teams in Italics were not known at the time of the draw. Teams in Bold advanced to the third round.

League Two	Highland Football League	Lowland Football League	Other
Albion Rovers; **Annan Athletic**; **Berwick Rangers**; Clyde; **Cowdenbeath**; **Edinburgh City**; **Elgin City**; **Peterhead**; **Queen's Park**; Stirling Albion	**Brora Rangers**; Cove Rangers; Deveronvale; **Formartine United**; **Fraserburgh**; Rothes	**BSC Glasgow**; Civil Service Strollers; Cumbernauld Colts; **East Kilbride**; East Stirlingshire; Edusport Academy; **Gala Fairydean Rovers**; Gretna 2008; Kelty Hearts; Spartans; **Stirling University**; Whitehill Welfare	East of Scotland teams: Coldstream; Linlithgow Rose; SJFA teams: **Auchinleck Talbot**; **Beith**

=== Matches ===
20 October 2018	**Cowdenbeath**	**2–1**	Clyde	Cowdenbeath
15:00	Deas 10'; Cox 84'	Report	Goodwillie 88'	Stadium: Central Park; Attendance: 384; Referee: Graham Beaton

20 October 2018	Rothes	**0–1**	**Annan Athletic**	Rothes
15:00		Report	Wright 37'	Stadium: Mackessack Park; Attendance: 320; Referee: Peter Stuart

20 October 2018	Stirling Albion	**1–2**	**Queen's Park**	Stirling
15:00	Docherty 61'	Report	Hawke 25'; McLauchlan 42'	Stadium: Forthbank Stadium; Attendance: 516; Referee: David Munro

20 October 2018	Cumbernauld Colts	**1–4**	**BSC Glasgow**	Cumbernauld
15:00	Team 67'	Report	Hughes 45'; Pignatiello 49'; Duncan 83'; Orr 87'	Stadium: Broadwood Stadium; Attendance: 127; Referee: Calum Scott

20 October 2018	Edusport Academy	**1–2**	**Fraserburgh**	Annan
15:00	Coogans 90'	Report	Campbell 51'; Buchan 80'	Stadium: Galabank; Attendance: 109; Referee: Kyle Hall

20 October 2018	**Elgin City**	**2–0**	Whitehill Welfare	Elgin
15:00	Morrison 12'; McHardy 45'	Report		Stadium: Borough Briggs; Attendance: 599; Referee: Scott Lambie

20 October 2018	**Brora Rangers**	**6–0**	Coldstream	Brora
15:00	Pickles 8'; Nicolson 22'; Herdman 26' (o.g.); Gillespie 76'; MacLeod 85'; MacKay 89'	Report		Stadium: Dudgeon Park; Attendance: 255; Referee: Stephen Graham

20 October 2018	**Edinburgh City**	**1–0**	Civil Service Strollers	Edinburgh
15:00	McIntyre 70'	Report		Stadium: Ainslie Park; Attendance: 249; Referee: Stephen Brown

20 October 2018	Deveronvale	**1–2**	**Stirling University**	Banff
15:00	Wallace 64'	Report	Bonar 60' (pen.); Slattery 68'	Stadium: Princess Royal Park; Attendance: 226; Referee: Duncan Williams

20 October 2018	Cove Rangers	**1–1**	Auchinleck Talbot	Aberdeen
15:00	Megginson 5'	Report	G.Wilson 69' (pen.)	Stadium: Balmoral Stadium; Attendance: 740; Referee: Chris Fordyce

20 October 2018	**Beith**	**4–0**	Linlithgow Rose	Beith
15:00	Wilson 8'; Sheridan 14'; Christie 48'; Frize 62'	Report		Stadium: Bellsdale Park; Attendance: 483; Referee: William Wilson

20 October 2018	**East Kilbride**	**3–1**	Spartans	East Kilbride
15:00	Malcolm 39', 59'; Winter 70'	Report	Corbett 5'	Stadium: K-Park Training Academy; Attendance: 166; Referee: Liam Duncan

20 October 2018	Albion Rovers	**0–2**	**Formartine United**	Coatbridge
15:00		Report	MacPhee 3'; Greig 77' (pen.)	Stadium: Cliftonhill; Attendance: 246; Referee: Duncan Smith

20 October 2018	**Peterhead**	**3–2**	Kelty Hearts	Peterhead
15:00	McLean 7'; McAllister 74'; Lyle 90'	Report	Chalmers 20'; Gay 90'	Stadium: Balmoor Stadium; Attendance: 658; Referee: Grant Irvine

20 October 2018	**Gala Fairydean Rovers**	**2–0**	East Stirlingshire	Galashiels
15:00	Paton 31'; Miller 83'	Report		Stadium: Netherdale; Attendance: 240; Referee: Graham Grainger

20 October 2018	**Berwick Rangers**	**3–1**	Gretna 2008	Berwick-upon-Tweed, England
15:00	Willis 38', 52'; Scott 51'	Report	Hope 87'	Stadium: Shielfield Park; Attendance: 356; Referee: David Dickinson

=== Replay ===
27 October 2018	**Auchinleck Talbot**	**2–1**	Cove Rangers	Auchinleck
14:30	S. Wilson 42'; Kemp 61'	Report	Megginson 52' (pen.)	Stadium: Beechwood Park; Attendance: 650; Referee: Chris Fordyce

== Third round ==
The third round took place on the weekend of 24 November 2018. Along with the 16 winners from the second round, there were 16 new entries at this stage - all 10 from League One, and six from the Championship.

=== Draw ===
The draw for the third round took place at Hampden Park on 20 October 2018 at 5:45pm.

Teams in Italics were not known at the time of the draw. Teams in Bold advanced to the fourth round.

Championship	League One	League Two	Highland Football League	Lowland Football League	SJFA
**Alloa Athletic**; **Ayr United**; Falkirk; **Greenock Morton**; **Inverness Caledonian Thistle**; **Queen of the South**	**Airdrieonians**; Arbroath; Brechin City; Dumbarton; **East Fife**; **Forfar Athletic**; **Montrose**; **Raith Rovers**; **Stenhousemuir**; **Stranraer**	Annan Athletic; Berwick Rangers; **Cowdenbeath**; Edinburgh City; **Elgin City**; Peterhead; Queen's Park	Brora Rangers; Formartine United; Fraserburgh	BSC Glasgow; **East Kilbride**; Gala Fairydean Rovers; Stirling University	**Auchinleck Talbot**; Beith

=== Matches ===
24 November 2018	Beith	**0–3**	**Ayr United**	Beith
13:30		Report	Shankland 64'; Docherty 78'; Moffat 88'	Stadium: Bellsdale Park; Attendance: 1,780; Referee: Colin Steven

24 November 2018	**Airdrieonians**	**3–0**	Dumbarton	Airdrie
15:00	Wilkie 26', 77'; Duffy 36'	Report		Stadium: Penny Cars Stadium; Attendance: 592; Referee: Steven Kirkland

24 November 2018	**Alloa Athletic**	**3–0**	Brechin City	Alloa
15:00	Zanatta 31'; Spence 59'; Trouten 61'	Report		Stadium: Indodrill Stadium; Attendance: 301; Referee: Steven Reid

24 November 2018	Arbroath	**0–1**	**Stranraer**	Arbroath
15:00		Report	I. Smith 76'	Stadium: Gayfield Park; Attendance: 496; Referee: David Dickinson

24 November 2018	Berwick Rangers	**1–2**	**East Fife**	Berwick-upon-Tweed, England
15:00	Healy 56'	Report	Davidson 6'; Agnew 11'	Stadium: Shielfield Park; Attendance: 401; Referee: John McKendrick

24 November 2018	**Cowdenbeath**	**1–0**	Brora Rangers	Cowdenbeath
15:00	Cox 39'	Report		Stadium: Central Park; Attendance: 432; Referee: Duncan Williams

24 November 2018	**East Kilbride**	**1–0**	Gala Fairydean Rovers	East Kilbride
15:00	Longworth 90'	Report		Stadium: K-Park Training Academy; Attendance: 180; Referee: Connor Ashwood

24 November 2018	**Forfar Athletic**	**2–0**	BSC Glasgow	Forfar
15:00	Baird 75'; Moore 85'	Report		Stadium: Station Park; Attendance: 385; Referee: Grant Irvine

24 November 2018	Fraserburgh	**0–1**	**Auchinleck Talbot**	Fraserburgh
15:00		Report	S. Wilson 60'	Stadium: Bellslea Park; Attendance: 721; Referee: Peter Stuart

24 November 2018	Greenock Morton	**1–1**	Peterhead	Greenock
15:00	McHugh 40'	Report	Brown 26'	Stadium: Cappielow; Attendance: 958; Referee: Mike Roncone

24 November 2018	Montrose	**0–0**	Annan Athletic	Montrose
15:00		Report		Stadium: Links Park; Attendance: 585; Referee: David Lowe

24 November 2018	**Queen of the South**	**4–1**	Formartine United	Dumfries
15:00	Dobbie 2', 8'; Dykes 42'; Mercer 67'	Report	Wood 28'	Stadium: Palmerston Park; Attendance: 931; Referee: Gavin Ross

24 November 2018	Queen's Park	**0–3**	**Raith Rovers**	Glasgow
15:00		Report	Nisbet 13'; Buchanan 24'; Flanagan 56'	Stadium: Hampden Park; Attendance: 679; Referee: Lloyd Wilson

24 November 2018	**Stenhousemuir**	**4–2**	Falkirk	Stenhousemuir
15:00	McBrearty 12', 16'; Dickson 59'; McGuigan 85'	Report	Paton 6'; McKee 42'	Stadium: Ochilview Park; Attendance: 2,050; Referee: Alan Newlands

24 November 2018	Stirling University	**0–4**	**Elgin City**	Stirling
15:00		Report	Omar 9'; Cameron 14'; Hay 58'; Loveland 80'	Stadium: Forthbank Stadium; Attendance: 395; Referee: Barry Cook

25 November 2018	Edinburgh City	**1–1**	Inverness Caledonian Thistle	Edinburgh
15:00	L.Henderson 86'	Report	Rooney 39'	Stadium: Ainslie Park; Attendance: 867; Referee: David Munro

=== Replays ===
27 November 2018	Annan Athletic	**3–4**	**Montrose**	Annan
19:45	Smith 61' (pen.), 79'; Sonkur 84'	Report	Rennie 19' (pen.); Fotheringham 23'; Watson 25'; Steeves 30'	Stadium: Galabank; Attendance: 205; Referee: David Lowe

27 November 2018	Peterhead	**0–3**	**Greenock Morton**	Peterhead
20:00		Report	Waddell 10'; R.Thomson 61'; Millar 83'	Stadium: Balmoor Stadium; Attendance: 527; Referee: Gavin Ross

4 December 2018	**Inverness Caledonian Thistle**	**6–1**	Edinburgh City	Inverness
19:45	Walsh 5', 53'; White 15', 60', 61'; Doran 90'	Report	B. Henderson 7'	Stadium: Caledonian Stadium; Attendance: 672; Referee: David Munro

== Fourth round ==
The fourth round took place on the weekend of 19 January 2019. Along with the 16 winners from the third round, there were 16 new entries at this stage - the remaining four clubs from the Championship, and all 12 from the Premiership.

=== Draw ===
The draw for the fourth round took place at Hampden Park on 24 November 2018 at 5:45pm.

Teams in Italics were not known at the time of the draw. Teams in Bold advanced to the fifth round.

Premiership	Championship	League One	League Two	Other
**Aberdeen**; **Celtic**; Dundee; Hamilton Academical; **Heart of Midlothian**; **Hibernian**; **Kilmarnock**; Livingston; Motherwell; **Rangers**; **St Johnstone**; **St Mirren**	Alloa Athletic; Ayr United; **Dundee United**; Dunfermline Athletic; Greenock Morton; **Inverness Caledonian Thistle**; **Partick Thistle**; **Queen of the South**; **Ross County**	Airdrieonians; **East Fife**; Forfar Athletic; Montrose; **Raith Rovers**; Stenhousemuir; Stranraer	Cowdenbeath; Elgin City	Lowland Football League: East Kilbride; SJFA: **Auchinleck Talbot**

=== Matches ===
19 January 2019	**Auchinleck Talbot**	**1–0**	Ayr United	Auchinleck
12:15	McCracken 78'	Report		Stadium: Beechwood Park; Attendance: 3,100; Referee: Euan Anderson

19 January 2019	**East Fife**	**2–1**	Greenock Morton	Methil
15:00	Dowds 9'; Watson 75'	Report	McHugh 7'	Stadium: Bayview Stadium; Attendance: 903; Referee: Steven Kirkland

19 January 2019	**St Mirren**	**3–2**	Alloa Athletic	Paisley
15:00	Cooke 68'; Erhahon 85'; McAllister 87'	Report	Trouten 26'; Cawley 34'	Stadium: St Mirren Park; Attendance: 2,760; Referee: Don Robertson

19 January 2019	**Inverness Caledonian Thistle**	**4–0**	East Kilbride	Inverness
15:00	White 6'; Doran 21'; Polworth 27'; Reid 71' (o.g.)	Report		Stadium: Caledonian Stadium; Attendance: 1,196; Referee: Mike Roncone

19 January 2019	**Hibernian**	**4–0**	Elgin City	Edinburgh
15:00	Kamberi 21'; Horgan 25', 53'; Mallan 45' (pen.)	Report		Stadium: Easter Road; Attendance: 7,082; Referee: Nick Walsh

19 January 2019	Aberdeen	**1–1**	Stenhousemuir	Aberdeen
15:00	Lowe 21'	Report	McGuigan 71'	Stadium: Pittodrie Stadium; Attendance: 9,661; Referee: Barry Cook

19 January 2019	**St Johnstone**	**2–0**	Hamilton Academical	Perth
15:00	Kerr 1'; Watt 26'	Report		Stadium: McDiarmid Park; Attendance: 2,363; Referee: John Beaton

19 January 2019	Dundee	**1–1**	Queen of the South	Dundee
15:00	Curran 45'	Report	Dobbie 28'	Stadium: Dens Park; Attendance: 2,728; Referee: Kevin Clancy

19 January 2019	Motherwell	**1–2**	**Ross County**	Motherwell
15:00	Hastie 90+1'	Report	Graham 52', 60'	Stadium: Fir Park; Attendance: 3,869; Referee: Steven McLean

19 January 2019	**Raith Rovers**	**3–0**	Dunfermline Athletic	Kirkcaldy
15:00	Vaughan 69' (pen.), 78', 81'	Report		Stadium: Stark's Park; Attendance: 6,013; Referee: Bobby Madden

19 January 2019	Montrose	**0–4**	**Dundee United**	Montrose
15:00		Report	Šafranko 8'; Booth 43'; King 81'; Harkes 90+2'	Stadium: Links Park; Attendance: 3,604; Referee: David Munro

19 January 2019	**Kilmarnock**	**2–0**	Forfar Athletic	Kilmarnock
15:00	Findlay 19'; Burke 78'	Report		Stadium: Rugby Park; Attendance: 4,376; Referee: Greg Aitken

19 January 2019	**Partick Thistle**	**4–1**	Stranraer	Glasgow
15:00	Fitzpatrick 17'; Cardle 50'; Saunders 74'; Spittal 81'	Report	Crossan 52'	Stadium: Firhill Stadium; Attendance: 2,254; Referee: Alan Newlands

19 January 2019	**Celtic**	**3–0**	Airdrieonians	Glasgow
17:15	Sinclair 37', 56'; Weah 83'	Report		Stadium: Celtic Park; Attendance: 29,941; Referee: Andrew Dallas

20 January 2019	**Heart of Midlothian**	**1–0**	Livingston	Edinburgh
14:30	Clare 48'	Report		Stadium: Tynecastle Park; Attendance: 11,077; Referee: Willie Collum

30 January 2019	Cowdenbeath	**1–3**	**Rangers**	Cowdenbeath
19:45	Cox 47'	Report	Halliday 12'; Coulibaly 26'; Lafferty 45'	Stadium: Central Park; Attendance: 4,116; Referee: Craig Thomson

=== Replays ===
29 January 2019	Stenhousemuir	**1–4**	**Aberdeen**	Stenhousemuir
19:30	Munro 53'	Report	McGinn 13'; Cosgrove 30' (pen.); Stewart 38'; Donaldson 67' (o.g.)	Stadium: Ochilview Park; Attendance: 2,429; Referee: Barry Cook

29 January 2019	**Queen of the South**	**3–0**	Dundee	Dumfries
19:45	Dobbie 12', 27', 74'	Report		Stadium: Palmerston Park; Attendance: 1,421; Referee: Steven McLean

== Fifth round ==
The fifth round took place on the weekend of 9 February 2019.

=== Draw ===
The draw for the fifth round took place at Tynecastle Stadium on 20 January 2019 following the Hearts v Livingston match live on BBC One Scotland.

Teams in Italics were not known at the time of the draw. Teams in Bold advanced to the quarter-finals.

Premiership	Championship	League One	SJFA
**Aberdeen**; **Celtic**; **Heart of Midlothian**; **Hibernian**; Kilmarnock; **Rangers**; St Johnstone; St Mirren	**Dundee United**; **Inverness Caledonian Thistle**; **Partick Thistle**; Queen of the South; Ross County	East Fife; Raith Rovers	Auchinleck Talbot

=== Matches ===
9 February 2019	**Hibernian**	**3–1**	Raith Rovers	Edinburgh
15:00	Horgan 22'; Slivka 38'; McNulty 58'	Report	Murray 75'	Stadium: Easter Road; Attendance: 9,131; Referee: Bobby Madden

9 February 2019	St Mirren	**1–2**	**Dundee United**	Paisley
15:00	Nazon 77'	Report	Šafranko 15'; Clark 45'	Stadium: St Mirren Park; Attendance: 3,965; Referee: Willie Collum

9 February 2019	East Fife	**0–1**	**Partick Thistle**	Methil
15:00		Report	Anderson 61'	Stadium: Bayview Stadium; Attendance: 1,724; Referee: Don Robertson

9 February 2019	Kilmarnock	**0–0**	Rangers	Kilmarnock
17:15		Report		Stadium: Rugby Park; Attendance: 11,430; Referee: Alan Muir

10 February 2019	**Celtic**	**5–0**	St Johnstone	Glasgow
13:30	Sinclair 3', 54', 89'; Brown 9'; Forrest 52'	Report		Stadium: Celtic Park; Attendance: 28,404; Referee: Nick Walsh

10 February 2019	**Heart of Midlothian**	**4–0**	Auchinleck Talbot	Edinburgh
15:00	Berra 10'; Mitchell 31'; MacLean 38'; Keena 86'	Report		Stadium: Tynecastle Park; Attendance: 14,946; Referee: Kevin Clancy

10 February 2019	**Aberdeen**	**4–1**	Queen of the South	Aberdeen
15:30	McGinn 47'; Considine 63'; Cosgrove 67', 73' (pen.)	Report	Dobbie 50'	Stadium: Pittodrie Stadium; Attendance: 7,857; Referee: Euan Anderson

11 February 2019	Ross County	**2–2**	Inverness Caledonian Thistle	Dingwall
19:15	Stewart 55'; Mullin 90+1'	Report	Doran 13'; McKay 65'	Stadium: Victoria Park; Attendance: 2,862; Referee: John Beaton

=== Replays ===
19 February 2019	**Inverness Caledonian Thistle**	**2–2** (a.e.t.) (**5–4** p)	Ross County	Inverness
19:45	White 56', 81'	Report	Stewart 22'; Gardyne 67'	Stadium: Caledonian Stadium; Attendance: 3,608; Referee: John Beaton
	**Penalties**
	White (penalty scored); Donaldson (penalty scored); Welsh (penalty scored); Polworth (penalty scored); Austin (penalty scored)		(penalty scored) Gardyne; (penalty scored) Fraser; (penalty missed) McManus; (penalty scored) Graham; (penalty scored) Draper

20 February 2019	**Rangers**	**5–0**	Kilmarnock	Glasgow
19:45	Morelos 7', 45', 78', 83'; Halliday 77'	Report		Stadium: Ibrox Stadium; Attendance: 37,918; Referee: Alan Muir

== Quarter-finals ==
The quarter-finals took place on the weekend of 2 March 2019.

=== Draw ===
The draw for the quarter-finals took place at Victoria Park on 11 February 2019 following the Ross County v Inverness Caledonian Thistle match live on BBC Two Scotland.

Teams in Italics were not known at the time of the draw. Teams in Bold advanced to the semi-finals.

Premiership	Championship
**Aberdeen**; **Celtic**; **Heart of Midlothian**; Hibernian; Rangers	Dundee United; **Inverness Caledonian Thistle**; Partick Thistle

=== Matches ===
2 March 2019	Hibernian	**0–2**	**Celtic**	Edinburgh
17:15		Report	Forrest 62'; Brown 75'	Stadium: Easter Road; Attendance: 15,719; Referee: Willie Collum

3 March 2019	Aberdeen	**1–1**	Rangers	Aberdeen
13:30	Cosgrove 11' (pen.)	Report	Worrall 49'	Stadium: Pittodrie Stadium; Attendance: 15,395; Referee: Kevin Clancy

3 March 2019	Dundee United	**1–2**	**Inverness Caledonian Thistle**	Dundee
15:30	Clark 68' (pen.)	Report	Chalmers 19'; Doran 90'	Stadium: Tannadice Park; Attendance: 7,274; Referee: Steven McLean

4 March 2019	Partick Thistle	**1–1**	Heart of Midlothian	Glasgow
19:05	Elliott 72'	Report	Berra 12'	Stadium: Firhill Stadium; Attendance: 5,171; Referee: Bobby Madden

=== Replays ===
12 March 2019	**Heart of Midlothian**	**2–1**	Partick Thistle	Edinburgh
19:45	Ikpeazu 24'; Clare 35' (pen.)	Report	McDonald 17'	Stadium: Tynecastle Park; Attendance: 10,351; Referee: Bobby Madden

12 March 2019	Rangers	**0–2**	**Aberdeen**	Glasgow
19:45		Report	McGinn 3'; McLennan 62'	Stadium: Ibrox Stadium; Attendance: 47,397; Referee: Kevin Clancy

== Semi-finals ==
The semi-finals took place on the weekend of 13 April 2019.

=== Draw ===
The draw for the semi-finals took place at Firhill Stadium on 4 March 2019 during 'The Nine' live on BBC Scotland.

Teams in Italics were not known at the time of the draw. Teams in Bold advanced to the final.

Premiership	Championship
Aberdeen; **Celtic**; **Heart of Midlothian**	Inverness Caledonian Thistle

=== Matches ===
13 April 2019	**Heart of Midlothian**	**3–0**	Inverness Caledonian Thistle	Glasgow
12:15	Ikpeazu 49'; Souttar 66'; Clare 74' (pen.)	Report		Stadium: Hampden Park; Attendance: 21,011; Referee: Don Robertson

14 April 2019	Aberdeen	**0–3**	**Celtic**	Glasgow
14:00		Report	Forrest 45+2'; Édouard 61' (pen.); Rogić 69'	Stadium: Hampden Park; Attendance: 46,773; Referee: Craig Thomson

== Final ==
The final was played on 25 May 2019 at Hampden Park in Glasgow.

25 May 2019
15:00

Heart of Midlothian	1–2	Celtic
Edwards 52'	Report	Édouard 62' (pen.), 82'

Hampden Park, Glasgow
Attendance: 49,434
Referee: Willie Collum

== Bracket ==
The following is the bracket which the Scottish Cup resembled. Numbers in parentheses next to the match score represent the results of a replay, and numbers in parentheses next to the replay score represents the results of a penalty shoot-out.

**Fourth Round**; 19–20 January 2019; 29 January 2019 (replays)
**East Fife**	**2**
Greenock Morton	1
**Partick Thistle**	**4**
Stranraer	1
**Heart of Midlothian**	**1**
Livingston	0
**Auchinleck Talbot**	**1**
Ayr United	0
**St Mirren**	**3**
Alloa Athletic	2
Montrose	0
**Dundee United**	**4**
Motherwell	1
**Ross County**	**2**
**Inverness Caledonian Thistle**	**4**
East Kilbride	0
**Aberdeen**	**1 (4)**
Stenhousemuir	1 (1)
Dundee	1 (0)
**Queen of the South**	**1 (3)**
**Kilmarnock**	**2**
Forfar Athletic	0
Cowdenbeath	1
**Rangers**	**3**
**Raith Rovers**	**3**
Dunfermline Athletic	0
**Hibernian**	**4**
Elgin City	0
**Celtic**	**3**
Airdrieonians	0
**St Johnstone**	**2**
Hamilton Academical	0

**Fifth Round**; 9–11 February 2019; 19–20 February 2019 (replays)
East Fife	0
**Partick Thistle**	**1**
**Heart of Midlothian**	**4**
Auchinleck Talbot	0
St Mirren	1
**Dundee United**	**2**
Ross County	2 (2) (4)
**Inverness Caledonian Thistle**	**2 (2) (5)**
**Aberdeen**	**4**
Queen of the South	1
Kilmarnock	0 (0)
**Rangers**	**0 (5)**
**Hibernian**	**3**
Raith Rovers	1
**Celtic**	**5**
St Johnstone	0

**Quarter-finals**; 2–4 March 2019; 12 March 2019 (replays)
Partick Thistle	1 (1)
**Heart of Midlothian**	**1 (2)**
Dundee United	1
**Inverness Caledonian Thistle**	**2**
**Aberdeen**	**1 (2)**
Rangers	1 (0)
Hibernian	0
**Celtic**	**2**

**Semi-finals**; 13–14 April 2019
**Heart of Midlothian**	**3**
Inverness Caledonian Thistle	0
Aberdeen	0
**Celtic**	**3**

**Final**; 26 May 2019
Heart of Midlothian	1
**Celtic**	**2**

== Media coverage ==
From round four onwards, selected matches from the Scottish Cup are broadcast live in the UK and Ireland by BBC Scotland and Premier Sports (EIR Sport in the Republic of Ireland). BBC Scotland has the option to show two ties per round, with Premier Sports also showing two ties per round; Premier Sports show both semi-finals live with one of them also on BBC Scotland, and both channels screen the final live.

The following matches are to be broadcast live on UK television:

Round	BBC Scotland	Premier Sports
Fourth Round	Auchinleck Talbot v Ayr United; Heart of Midlothian v Livingston	Cowdenbeath v Rangers; Celtic v Airdrieonians
Fifth Round	Aberdeen v Queen of the South; Ross County v Inverness Caledonian Thistle	Kilmarnock v Rangers; Celtic v St Johnstone; Rangers v Kilmarnock (replay) (delayed coverage) (also on FreeSports)
Quarter-Finals	Dundee United v Inverness Caledonian Thistle; Partick Thistle v Heart of Midlothian	Hibernian v Celtic; Aberdeen v Rangers; Rangers v Aberdeen (replay) (delayed coverage)
Semi-Finals	Heart of Midlothian v Inverness Caledonian Thistle	Heart of Midlothian v Inverness Caledonian Thistle; Aberdeen v Celtic
Final	Heart of Midlothian v Celtic	
