= Jordan Marshall (footballer, born 1996) =

English footballer

Personal information
- Date of birth: 27 October 1996 (age 30)
- Place of birth: Newcastle upon Tyne, England
- Position: Left-back

Team information
- Current team: South Shields

Youth career
- Carlisle United

Senior career*
Years	Team	Apps	(Gls)
2015–2019	Queen of the South	124	(3)
2019–2023	Dundee	97	(2)
2023–2026	The New Saints	39	(1)
2026–	South Shields	7	(1)
- * Club domestic league appearances and goals as of 18 October 2026

Jordan Marshall (born 27 October 1996) is an English footballer who plays as a left-back for National League North club South Shields. He has previously played for Queen of the South, Dundee and The New Saints.

== Career ==
Marshall was born in Newcastle upon Tyne and is a product of the Carlisle United Academy.

=== Queen of the South ===
On 29 June 2015, Marshall signed for Queen of the South after being involved with them in the latter part of the previous season. His signing was announced alongside that of Dale Hilson and Kyle Jacobs. Marshall first played for Queens on 25 July 2015 in the first round of the Scottish League Challenge Cup, playing the full 90 minutes of a 2–0 win over Stranraer at Palmerston Park and receiving a yellow card in the tenth minute. He made his league debut on 8 August 2015 as Queens started the Scottish Championship season with a 3–1 home win over Alloa Athletic, again playing the entirety of the match. On 25 February 2017, he signed a one-year extension to his contract until May 2018.

On 17 March 2018, Marshall scored his first goal for Queen of the South in a 3–1 defeat versus St Mirren at Palmerston. He initially decided to leave the club at the end of the 2017-18 season, turning down the offer of a new contract, but he failed to find a new club during the 2018 close season and decided to sign a new one-year contract with Queens on 25 June 2018.

=== Dundee ===
On 18 June 2019, Marshall signed a two-year contract with Dundee. He impressed throughout his first season, until it was ended early due to severe thigh strain. On 7 January 2021, he signed a two-year contract extension with Dundee, keeping him with the club until 2023. Marshall would return from injuries in time to be a part of the Dundee team which won the Premiership play-offs and gained promotion to the Scottish Premiership.

Marshall would make his 100th appearance for the Dark Blues on 17 September 2022 against Inverness Caledonian Thistle. After suffering a knee injury in October, Marshall remained out of action until December when he started in an away win against Ayr United which put Dundee atop the Scottish Championship at Christmas. He would remain a consistent figure for the Dark Blues and would form a strong partnership with winger Luke Hannant en route to winning the Scottish Championship. On 31 May 2023, Dundee announced Marshall had not been offered a new contract and would leave the club.

=== The New Saints ===
On 6 October 2023, Marshall signed with Cymru Premier club The New Saints on a two-year contract. He made his debut on 18 October in a Welsh Cup win over Ruthin Town. Marshall would come off the bench for TNS in their Welsh League Cup final victory over Swansea City U21s. Marshall won the Cymru Premier with TNS on 2 March. On 24 March, Marshall came on as a substitute in the 2024 Scottish Challenge Cup final which TNS lost to Airdrieonians. On 8 March 2025, Marshall scored his first goal for the Saints in a home league win over Haverfordwest County. On 28 May 2025, TNS confirmed that Marshall had signed a new contract for the following season.

=== South Shields ===
On 24 June 2026, Marshall signed with National League North club South Shields.

== Career statistics ==
As of 5 September 2026

Appearances and goals by club, season and competition
Club	Season	League			National Cup		League Cup		Continental		Other		Total	
Club	Season	Division	Apps	Goals	Apps	Goals	Apps	Goals	Apps	Goals	Apps	Goals	Apps	Goals
Queen of the South	2015–16	Scottish Championship	29	0	1	0	2	0	—		2 (Note: Appearances in the Scottish Challenge Cup)	0	34	0
Queen of the South	2016–17	Scottish Championship	31	0	1	0	5	0	—		4	0	41	0
Queen of the South	2017–18	Scottish Championship	29	2	2	0	4	0	—		4	0	39	2
Queen of the South	2018–19	Scottish Championship	35	1	4	0	5	0	—		7 (Note: Three appearances in the Scottish Challenge Cup and four appearances in the Scottish Championship play-offs)	0	51	1
Queen of the South	Total		124	3	8	0	16	0	0	0	17	0	165	3
Dundee	2019–20	Scottish Championship	17	0	1	0	5	0	—		0	0	23	0
Dundee	2020–21	Scottish Championship	24	1	2	0	4	0	—		2 (Note: Appearances in the Premiership play-offs)	0	32	1
Dundee	2021–22	Scottish Premiership	30	1	1	0	4	0	—		0	0	35	1
Dundee	2022–23	Scottish Championship	26	0	1	0	5	0	—		2	0	34	0
Dundee	Total		97	2	5	0	18	0	0	0	4	0	124	2
The New Saints	2023–24	Cymru Premier	6	0	4	0	1	0	—		2	0	13	0
The New Saints	2024–25	Cymru Premier	12	1	2	0	1	0	7 (Note: One appearance in the UEFA Champions League, two appearances in the UEFA Europa League, and four appearances in the UEFA Conference League)	0	—		22	1
The New Saints	2025–26	Cymru Premier	21	0	2	0	3	0	4 (Note: Two appearances in the UEFA Champions League, two appearances in the UEFA Conference League)	0	0	0	30	0
The New Saints	Total		39	1	8	0	5	0	11	0	2	0	65	1
South Shields	2026–27	National League North	5	1	0	0	0	0	0	0	0	0	5	1
Career total			265	7	21	0	39	0	11	0	23	0	359	7

== Honours ==
Dundee

- Scottish Premiership play-offs: 2020–21
- Scottish Championship: 2022–23

The New Saints

- Welsh League Cup (2): 2023–24, 2024–25
- Cymru Premier (3): 2023–24, 2024–25, 2025–26
- Welsh Cup: 2024–25
