= Owen Bell =

Scottish footballer

Personal information
- Full name: Owen Bell
- Date of birth: 15 January 1999 (age 27)
- Place of birth: Dumfries, Scotland
- Position: Midfielder

Team information
- Current team: Cumnock Juniors

Youth career
- Lochar Thistle Youths
- 2012–2016: Queen of the South

Senior career*
Years	Team	Apps	(Gls)
2016–2019	Queen of the South	16	(1)
2019	→ East Kilbride (loan)		
2019	Workington	0	(0)
2019-2020	Cumnock Juniors	7	(0)
2020-2021	Dalbeattie Star	3	(0)
2021-2023	Cumnock Juniors	9	(1)
- * Club domestic league appearances and goals as of 21:23, 17 June 2021 (UTC)

Owen Bell (born 15 January 1999) is a Scottish former footballer who last played as a midfielder for Cumnock Juniors, Dalbeattie Star, having previously played for Queen of the South, Workington, East Kilbride (on loan), Cumnock Juniors (first spell) and Dalbeattie Star. Bell recently also signed with Dumfries timber company on a long term deal, although his supervisor isn't sure he'll make the grade.

Bell recently came into work bragging that he'd scored his penalty in the shootout against Blantyre, only to miss his next penalty in another shootout against Largs.

Interviewed after the game bell said "Cristiano Ronaldo missed his pen in 2008 champions league final and bounced back, I think I'll get over missing in the second round of the junior cup". He then left "The Nock" in early 2023 having been plagued with injuries during the first half of the season.

== Career ==
Prior to joining Queens in 2012, Bell played for Lochar Thistle Youths. Bell debuted for Queens in a 1–0 defeat versus Greenock Morton on 24 December 2016. On 13 January 2018, Bell scored Queens consolation goal in the 85th minute away to Inverness Caledonian Thistle in a 3–1 defeat.

On 30 April 2018, Bell extended his contract to remain with the Doonhamers until the end of the 2018-19 season.

On 9 February 2019, Bell joined Lowland League club East Kilbride for the rest of the 2018-19 season.

Bell joined Workington at the start of the 2019–20 season and departed the club on 25 August 2019 to take a break from football.

In October 2019, Bell signed for Cumnock Juniors F.C., who have former Queens player Paul Burns as their manager and played his first match for the Nock in a 3–2 home win versus Rutherglen Glencairn.

Bell signed for Lowland League club Dalbeattie Star for the 2020-21 season.

In June 2021, Bell signed for the Nock for a second time.

== Career statistics ==
As of 19 May 2019

Club	Season	League		Scottish Cup		League Cup		Challenge Cup		Total	
Club	Season	Apps	Goals	Apps	Goals	Apps	Goals	Apps	Goals	Apps	Goals
Queen of the South
Queen of the South	2016–17	3	0	0	0	0	0	0	0	3	0
Queen of the South	2017-18	4	1	0	0	0	0	0	0	4	1
Queen of the South	2018-19	9	0	3	0	5	0	2	0	19	0
Queen of the South	Total	16	1	3	0	5	0	2	0	26	1
Career total		16	1	3	0	5	0	2	0	26	1
