= Jake Pickard =

English footballer

Personal information
- Date of birth: 14 March 1997 (age 29)
- Place of birth: Newcastle upon Tyne, England
- Position: Midfielder

Team information
- Current team: Washington

Senior career*
Years	Team	Apps	(Gls)
2015–2017	Queen of the South	96	(16)
2017–	Washington	10	(6)
- * Club domestic league appearances and goals as of 13:36, 7 October 2017

Jake Pickard (born 14 March 1997) is an English footballer who plays as a midfielder for Northern League Division One club Washington, who formerly played for Queen of the South in the Scottish Championship.

== Career ==
Born in Newcastle upon Tyne, Pickard began his career at Queen of the South and was first called up to a senior game on 22 November 2014 in a 2–0 home victory over Raith Rovers in the Scottish Championship. A week later Pickard made his debut in the fourth round of the Scottish Cup, replacing goalscorer Derek Lyle for the final four minutes of a 4–1 win versus Brora Rangers at Palmerston Park. Pickard's league debut was on 24 January 2015 when he replaced Ian McShane for the final eight minutes of a 2–0 home defeat to Hibernian. Pickard appeared a further ten times, all as a substitute, as his team reached the promotion play-offs.

Pickard departed the Doonhamers on 20 January 2017, in an attempt to find first-team football away from Dumfries.

In February 2017, Pickard signed for Washington for the second half of the 2016–17 season and was retained for the 2017–18 season.
