= Scott Mercer =

Scottish footballer (born 1995)

Personal information
- Date of birth: 18 June 1995 (age 31)
- Place of birth: Kirkcaldy, Scotland
- Height: 6 ft 0 in (1.83 m)
- Position: Defender

Team information
- Current team: Kelty Hearts
- Number: 20

Youth career
- 2005–2013: Dunfermline Athletic

Senior career*
Years	Team	Apps	(Gls)
2013–2015	Dunfermline Athletic	1	(0)
2013	→ Albion Rovers (loan)	1	(0)
2015–2017	East Fife	54	(1)
2017–2020	Queen of the South	86	(1)
2020–2021	Falkirk	16	(1)
2021–2023	East Fife	55	(5)
2023–2024	Edinburgh City	27	(1)
2024	Bonnyrigg Rose	11	(0)
2024–	Kelty Hearts	16	(1)
- * Club domestic league appearances and goals as of 21 December 2024

Scott Mercer (born 18 June 1995) is a Scottish professional footballer who plays as a defender for Scottish League Two club Kelty Hearts. He previously played for Dunfermline Athletic, Albion Rovers (loan spell), East Fife twice, Queen of the South, Falkirk, Edinburgh City and Bonnyrigg Rose.

== Career ==
Born in Kirkcaldy, Mercer began his career with Dunfermline Athletic in 2005, progressing through the club's youth set-up. On 8 November 2013, Mercer joined Scottish League Two club Albion Rovers on loan for one month, making his only appearance in a league match versus Berwick Rangers. After the Pars went into administration in 2013, Mercer played once for the club in a Scottish League One match versus Rangers, coming on as an 82nd minute substitute for Craig Dargo. Mercer did not feature for the club at all during the 2014–15 season and following the arrival of new manager Allan Johnston, Mercer was released by the club, along with seventeen other players.

After departing the Pars, Mercer signed for East Fife in July 2015. Mercer's first start for the club was in the Scottish Challenge Cup against Falkirk with his first league start versus East Stirlingshire. In his first season, Mercer was ever-present in the Methil club's defence, playing a total of 41 matches and scoring one goal versus Montrose. This helped the club win automatic promotion to Scottish League One.

Mercer's second season with the club started brightly, with the defender assisting the club to consolidate their position in the third tier of Scottish football. Mercer's impressive performances in Fife alerted the attention of newly appointed Queens manager Gary Naysmith, whom Mercer previously worked under in Methil. On 12 January 2017, Mercer signed for Queen of the South in the Scottish Championship for an undisclosed fee.

On 28 April 2018, Mercer extended his contract to remain with the Doonhamers until the end of the 2018–19 season. On the same day, Mercer sustained a broken foot after 16 minutes of Queens final league match of the 2017–18 season at Glebe Park versus Brechin City. On 24 November 2018, Mercer scored his first goal for Queens, scoring the final goal versus Formartine United at Palmerston in the third round of the Scottish Cup in a 4–1 win. On 11 June 2019, Mercer extended his contract to remain with Queens until the end of the 2019–20 season.

On 24 July 2020, Mercer signed a one-year deal with Falkirk. He returned to East Fife during the 2021 close season.

== Career statistics ==
As of 25 July 2020

Club statistics
Club	Season	League			Scottish Cup		League Cup		Other		Total	
Club	Season	Division	Apps	Goals	Apps	Goals	Apps	Goals	Apps	Goals	Apps	Goals
Dunfermline Athletic	2013–14	Scottish League One	1	0	0	0	0	0	0	0	1	0
Dunfermline Athletic	2014–15	Scottish League One	0	0	0	0	0	0	0	0	0	0
Dunfermline Athletic	Total		1	0	0	0	0	0	0	0	1	0
Albion Rovers (loan)	2013–14	Scottish League Two	1	0	0	0	0	0	0	0	1	0
East Fife	2015–16	Scottish League Two	36	1	2	0	2	0	1	0	41	1
East Fife	2016–17	Scottish League One	18	0	2	0	4	0	2	0	26	0
East Fife	Total		54	1	4	0	6	0	3	0	67	1
Queen of the South	2016–17	Scottish Championship	11	0	0	0	0	0	0	0	11	0
Queen of the South	2017–18	Scottish Championship	20	0	1	0	2	0	3	0	26	0
Queen of the South	2018–19	Scottish Championship	32	1	4	1	5	0	6	0	47	2
Queen of the South	2019–20	Scottish Championship	23	0	1	0	3	1	1	0	28	1
Queen of the South	Total		86	1	6	1	10	1	10	0	112	3
Falkirk	2020–21	Scottish League One	0	0	0	0	0	0	0	0	0	0
Career total			141	2	10	1	16	1	13	0	180	4
