= Shortlees A.F.C. =

Association football club in Scotland

Coordinates: 55.586891°N 4.499599°W

Shortlees
- Full name: Shortlees Amateurs Football Club
- Nickname: The Lees
- Founded: 2010
- Ground: Burnpark Recreation Ground, Kilmarnock
- Manager: Colin Smith
- League: Ayrshire AFA Premier Division
Home colours	Away colours

Shortlees Amateurs Football Club is a Scottish football club based in Kilmarnock, East Ayrshire, representing the neighbourhood of Shortlees.

In 2018 they won the Scottish Amateur Cup, granting entry to the following season's senior Scottish Cup for the first time in their history.
Shortlees won another Scottish Amateur Cup final in 2026, beating Drumchapel Amateurs 3–2 at Hampden Park.

== Overview ==
Shortlees are members of the Ayrshire Amateur Football Association and compete in its Premier Division, having been promoted as winners of the First Division in 2016.

They were established as a Sunday league team in 2009 and became more organised the following year, with the organisers (a football coach and the owner of the Murray Bar, the local public house) hoping to emulate the performance of a previous incarnation in the 1980s and 1990s, as well as provide a positive influence in the community. The team soon began moving up through the divisions of the Ayrshire AFA league.

In the Scottish Amateur Cup Final on 20 May 2018 at Hampden Park, they defeated Goldenhill AFC (Scottish Amateur Football League members from Clydebank) by a 2–1 scoreline. Defender Gordon Minor and former Kilmarnock F.C. youth player Joe Gold scored the Shortlees goals. They added the Ayrshire Premier Division title on 4 June 2018, defeating defending champions and arch rivals Hurlford Thistle 5–0 in the decisive fixture, with a crowd estimated at over 1000 in attendance to witness the victory.

As well as gaining promotion, in 2016 Shortlees had won the West of Scotland Cup (considered the most prestigious in the region after the Scottish Cup), and again the opponent they overcame in the final was Goldenhill, by the same scoreline.

The club play in black-and-red striped shirts or an all-white away kit. Their crest depicts a skull and crossbones. Their home ground is technically Burnpark Recreation Ground in Shortlees (a council housing estate within the historic parish of Riccarton, which today forms the southern portion of the Kilmarnock urban area), but home fixtures are played at various locations in the locality, including Riccarton Public Park and the artificial surface at Grange Academy.

=== Scottish Cup ===
Shortlees entered the 2018–19 Scottish Cup at the preliminary round 1 stage on 12 August 2018, away to East of Scotland Football League club Tynecastle. A 2–0 victory in Edinburgh was followed by another away fixture in the next round on 1 September against Bonnyrigg Rose (also East of Scotland League, although the Midlothian club entered as winners of the previous season's Junior East Superleague). A 3–0 victory for Bonnyrigg brought the Shortlees campaign to an end at that stage.

== Rivalries ==
One of Shortlees' main rivals are Hurlford Thistle, who also won the Scottish Amateur Cup in 2012 and 2014; however, those were the final years before its winners were invited to enter the senior Scottish Cup. Shortlees are therefore the first such entrants from Ayrshire and its regional league.
