= Aidan Smith =

Scottish footballer

Personal information
- Date of birth: 11 May 1997 (age 29)
- Place of birth: Dumfries, Scotland
- Position: Striker

Team information
- Current team: Annan Athletic
- Number: 9

Youth career
- 2008–2015: Queen of the South

Senior career*
Years	Team	Apps	(Gls)
2015–2017	Queen of the South	21	(2)
2016–2017	→ Annan Athletic (loan)	33	(7)
2017–2019	Annan Athletic	71	(23)
2019–2020	Peterhead	23	(0)
2020–	Annan Athletic	186	(45)
- * Club domestic league appearances and goals as of 5 May 2026

Aidan Smith (born 11 May 1997) is a Scottish footballer who plays for Annan Athletic as a striker. Smith has previously played for Queen of the South and Peterhead.

== Career ==
Born in Dumfries, Smith started his career at hometown club Queen of the South. Smith was first named in a match-day squad on 24 August 2013, remaining an unused substitute in the team's 2–0 defeat away to Hamilton Academical in the Scottish Championship. Smith was a named substitute for six other matches that season, although he was unused.

On 6 March 2015, Smith debuted in the quarter-finals of the Scottish Cup, replacing Gavin Reilly for the final 11 minutes of the 1–0 defeat at Palmerston Park versus Falkirk. Four days later, Smith made his league debut at Ibrox versus Rangers, replacing Reilly once again in the 83rd minute and three minutes later the 17-year-old scored his first career league goal, exploiting a mistake by goalkeeper Lee Robinson to earn a 1–1 draw for the Doonhamers.

Smith was then loaned out to Annan Athletic for the first half of the 2016–17 season, with the loan deal then extended until the end of the season on 7 January 2017. His contract with Queens wasn't renewed during May 2017, so he was released after spending seven seasons in the youth set-up at Palmerston from 2008 until 2015 and then two seasons in the first-team squad. On 14 June 2017, Smith signed a permanent deal with Annan Athletic, after a season-long spell on loan at Galabank from Queens during the 2016–17 season.

On 24 June 2019, Smith signed for Peterhead after two seasons with the Galabankies. He left Peterhead after one season, and returned to Annan in September 2020.

== Statistics ==
As of match played 23 October 2021

Appearances and goals by club, season and competition
Club	Season	League			Scottish Cup		League Cup		Other		Total	
Club	Season	Division	Apps	Goals	Apps	Goals	Apps	Goals	Apps	Goals	Apps	Goals
Queen of the South	2014–15	Scottish Championship	5	1	1	0	0	0	1 (Note: Appearance in the Premiership play-offs)	0	7	1
Queen of the South	2015–16	Scottish Championship	16	1	0	0	2	0	2 (Note: Appearances in the Scottish Challenge Cup)	0	20	1
Queen of the South	2016–17	Scottish Championship	0	0	0	0	2	0	0	0	2	0
Queen of the South	Total		21	2	1	0	4	0	3	0	29	2
Annan Athletic (loan)	2016–17	Scottish League Two	33	7	0	0	0	0	2 (Note: Appearances in the League One play-offs)	2	35	9
Annan Athletic	2017–18	Scottish League Two	36	12	1	0	4	0	2	3	43	15
Annan Athletic	2018–19	Scottish League Two	35	11	3	2	4	1	6 (Note: Two appearances in the Scottish Challenge Cup and four appearances in the Scottish League One play-offs)	0	48	14
Annan Athletic	Total		71	23	4	2	8	1	8	3	91	29
Peterhead	2019–20	Scottish League One	23	0	1	0	4	0	1	0	29	0
Annan Athletic	2020–21	Scottish League Two	22	2	1	1	4	0	0	0	27	3
Annan Athletic	2021–22	Scottish League Two	10	1	1	0	3	0	1	0	15	1
Annan Athletic	Total		32	3	2	1	7	0	1	0	42	4
Career total			180	35	8	3	23	1	15	5	226	44
