= Dean Brotherston =

Scottish footballer

Personal information
- Date of birth: 1 September 1997 (age 29)
- Place of birth: Dumfries, Scotland
- Positions: Full-back; striker

Team information
- Current team: Gretna 2008
- Number: 10

Youth career
- Queen of the South

Senior career*
| Years | Team | Apps | (Gls) |
| 2015–2017 | Queen of the South | 10 | (1) |
| 2017 | Dalbeattie Star (loan) | | |
| 2017 | Sunshine George Cross | | |
| 2017–2018 | Dalbeattie Star | | |
| 2018 | Forfar Athletic | 1 | (0) |
| 2018 | Dalbeattie Star | | |
| 2018–2019 | Cumnock Juniors | | |
| 2019–2023 | Dalbeattie Star | | |
| 2024- | Gretna 2008 | | |
- * Club domestic league appearances and goals as of 10:15, 1 July 2019 (UTC)

Dean Brotherston (born 1 September 1997) is a Scottish footballer who plays for Gretna 2008 in the Lowland League.

Predominately a striker during his career, Brotherston has previously played for Queen of the South in the Scottish Championship.

== Career ==
A product of the Queen of the South youth system, Brotherston scored his first goal for the club on 17 September 2016 in a 3–1 league victory over Raith Rovers. He went on loan to Lowland Football League club, Dalbeattie Star in early 2017 to gain more first-team experience, but was released by Queens in May 2017, having played in ten league matches and scoring one goal. In June 2017, Brotherston signed for Sunshine George Cross in Melbourne, Australia. After rejoining Dalbeattie on his return from Australia, Brotherston signed for Forfar Athletic on amateur terms in March 2018, making one appearance before the end of the season.

Brotherston signed for Dalbeattie Star in July 2018 for his third spell at the club but moved on to Cumnock Juniors two months later. Brotherston resigned for Star for the 2019-20 season.
