= 2015–16 Greenock Morton F.C. season =

Greenock Morton
2015-16 season
- Chairman: Douglas Rae
- Manager: Jim Duffy
- Stadium: Cappielow Park
- Championship: 5th
- Challenge Cup: First round (lost v Dumbarton)
- League Cup: Quarter-final (lost v St Johnstone)
- Scottish Cup: Quarter-final (lost v Celtic)
- Top goalscorer: League: Denny Johnstone (14); All: Denny Johnstone (17)
- Highest home attendance: League: 7,392 v Rangers; Cup: 2,539 v Motherwell
- Lowest home attendance: League: 1,175 v Queen of the South; Cup: 1,052 v Elgin City
- Average home league attendance: 2,726
Home colours	Away colours

Season 2015–16 saw Greenock Morton compete in the Scottish Championship the second tier of Scottish football, having finished top of the Scottish League One in 2014-15. Morton also competed in the Challenge Cup, Scottish League Cup and the Scottish Cup.

== Story of the season ==
=== May ===
After the conclusion to the 2014-15 season, manager Jim Duffy dedicated the title triumph to Greenock broadcaster Arthur Montford.

The first pre-season game of the season was announced as being an away fixture against BSC Glasgow, with Rotherham United visiting Cappielow for the third year in a row.

Jamie McCluskey was released, while Lee Kilday and Ricki Lamie were offered one-year contract extensions. Sean Crighton was also released along with Stefan Milojević, Aidan Ferris, Nicolas Caraux and Ross Caldwell. Jon Scullion also agreed a new contract with the club.

Brechin City winger Bobby Barr signed on a one-year deal. Joe McKee (one-year deal) and Jon Scullion (6-month contract) also re-sign.

Stefan McCluskey and Ross Forbes signed one-year contract extensions, as did Ricki Lamie, Michael Miller, Grant Adam and Derek Gaston. Thomas O'Ware also signed up on a one-year contract.

Andy Millen was appointed as Development squad manager to replace David Hopkin.

=== June ===
Warren Hawke was co-opted on to the club's board.

Celtic youth striker Luke Donnelly was announced as a loan target by manager Jim Duffy.

Four of Morton's U17 league winning side were offered full-time development contracts with the club; they were John Mitchell, Ruaridh Langan, Alex McWaters (all 17) and 16-year-old Scott Tiffoney.

Morton signed defender Frank McKeown from Stranraer. Young defender Craig Knight left the club by mutual consent on the same day.

When the fixtures were released on 19 June, Morton learned they would unfurl the Scottish League One championship flag against Falkirk on 8 August 2015.

Morton were given a home tie at home to Dumbarton in the first round of the Scottish Challenge Cup, when it was drawn on 29 June at St Mirren Park, Paisley.

=== July ===
Morton were drawn against Elgin City in the first round of the League Cup.

Frank McKeown and Peter MacDonald suffered minor injuries and were ruled out of most of pre-season.

Two of Morton's home games were selected by BBC Alba and BT Sport for live television coverage meaning they were moved to Friday (St Mirren) and Sunday (Rangers).

Morton's squad numbers were announced on 22 July, with new signings Frank McKeown and Bobby Barr getting numbers 5 and 16 respectively.

Ex-PSV Eindhoven youth player Romario Sabajo was offered a six-month deal, but fellow trialist Ricardo Talu would leave the club. He would sign the contract but would not be able to play against Dumbarton as the club were waiting on international clearance from the Dutch FA.

Morton tied up the signing of Birmingham City forward Denny Johnstone on a season-long loan.

Thomas O'Ware was ruled out for three weeks after going off injured at half time in the game against Dumbarton.

After scoring a brace as a trialist in a 3-0 win over Greenock Juniors, Chris Duggan would continue his trial for the foreseeable future according to manager Jim Duffy.

=== August ===
After defeating Elgin comfortably in the first round, Morton were drawn away to Queen of the South in round two of the League Cup.

After an injury to Frank McKeown, Morton brought in Canadian defender Luca Gasparotto on loan from Rangers until January 2016. The club also signed ex-Aberdeen youth Jai Quitongo on a free transfer for their development squad.

McKeown was ruled out for three months with extensive knee ligament damage.

Morton received international clearance to sign Romario Sabajo after a three-week hold up.

Queen of the South were defeated 1-0 to advance Morton to the third round of the League Cup, where they received a home tie against Motherwell.

=== September ===
Morton signed Swansea City striker Alex Samuel on loan until January.

In the third round of the Scottish League Cup, Motherwell were disposed of by three goals to two after extra-time. They were drawn against St Johnstone in the quarter-finals, for the second time in three years, to be played in late October.

=== October ===
The Renfrewshire derby with St Mirren was again chosen for coverage on BBC Alba, and moved forward to the Friday.

Mark Russell rejected an offer of a new contract, but stated that he would be willing to re-negotiate. However, Derek Gaston signed up for another two seasons until 2018.

Jordan Cairnie joined East Stirlingshire on an emergency loan until 6 January, whilst Cameron O'Neil was released by mutual consent.

Morton were eliminated from the Scottish League Cup by St Johnstone, by a scoreline of three goals to one.

Two days after the League Cup elimination, Morton were drawn away to Albion Rovers in the third round of the Scottish Cup.

=== November ===
After defeating Forfar in the third round, Morton were given a home tie against Ross County in the Little Big Shot Youth Cup.

Ricki Lamie ruled himself out for the whole of November with a hamstring tear.

Luca Gasparotto would be available to play against Queen of the South after he was not selected for Canada's matches against Honduras and El Salvador.

The development squad was eliminated from the Youth Cup by Ross County at Cappielow, with Thomas Orr scoring a second half consolation goal.

Morton would defeat Albion Rovers with goals from Denny Johnstone and Joe McKee to progress to the Scottish Cup fourth round.

=== December ===
Morton were drawn away from home against Livingston in the fourth round of the William Hill-sponsored Scottish Cup.

Another Morton fixture was moved for television purposes; Morton v Rangers which was due to be played on 23 January 2016 was moved back to the Monday night for BT Sport coverage.

Youth players Jai Quitongo and Lewis Strapp were rewarded for excellent form in the development squad with 18-month professional full-time contracts being offered. They would both accept the contract offers.

Jon Scullion was offered a contract extension until the end of the season, with the possibility of going out on loan.

With the end of his short-term contract approaching, Romario Sabajo will be allowed to return home after making few appearances for the first team.

Mark Russell signed a contract extension until the summer of 2017.

With the development league in its winter shutdown, captain Dylan Stevenson was loaned to Berwick Rangers for a month.

Morton brought last season's top scorer Declan McManus back to the club on loan from English side Fleetwood Town.

=== January ===
Grant Adam was released and signed for Cowdenbeath.

Matches against Hibernian were rescheduled to two midweek dates in February.

Alex Samuel's loan deal from Swansea City was extended until the end of the season.

Morton defeated Livingston to reach the fifth round of the Scottish Cup. Their reward was an away tie against Annan Athletic in the fifth round.

=== February ===
Luca Gasparotto was ruled out for up to 10 weeks with an ankle injury.

After defeating Annan Athletic in the fifth round, Morton received another away draw in their first quarter-final since 1999; away to Celtic at Celtic Park.

Andrew McNeil signed on a short-term deal until the end of the season.

Alex Samuel returned to Swansea to receive treatment after sustaining an injury in a Development League West match against Queen's Park.

Morton's quarter-final match with Celtic was chosen for television coverage by Sky Sports.

Morton signed winger Paul McMullan on loan from Celtic.

Bobby Barr signed a pre-contract agreement on a two-year deal with league rivals Raith Rovers.

=== March ===
Morton were eliminated from the Scottish Cup by three first-half goals to nil at Celtic Park.

Declan McManus was named as SPFL Championship player of the month for February.

Michael Tidser's season was ruled to be over when he suffered a suspected hernia.

After a 19-game unbeaten run Morton won the Development League West win a 1-1 draw with nearest rivals Ayr United.

=== April ===
Cappielow's pitch was given a platinum status by the SPFL, as one of the top four pitches in the country along with Bayview Stadium, Tynecastle Stadium and Hampden Park.

Thomas O'Ware agreed a two-year contract extension, tying him to the club until 2018. Ross Forbes followed him in agreeing a two-year contract.

Morton released defenders Frank McKeown, Jordan Cairnie and Luke Irvine.

Manager Jim Duffy signed a new two-year deal after successfully keeping the team in the Championship and reaching two cup quarter-finals.

== First team transfers ==
- From end of 2014-15 season, to last match of season 2015-16

=== In ===
Player	Last club	League	Fee
(Scotland) Bobby Barr	(Scotland) Brechin City	(Scotland) League One	Bosman
(Scotland) Frank McKeown	(Scotland) Stranraer	(Scotland) League One	Bosman
(Netherlands) Romario Sabajo	(Netherlands) FC Lienden	(Netherlands) Topklasse (Sunday League)	Free
(Scotland) Denny Johnstone	(England) Birmingham City	(England) Football League Championship	Loan
(Canada) Luca Gasparotto	(Scotland) Rangers	(Scotland) Championship	Loan
(Scotland) Jai Quitongo	(Scotland) Aberdeen	(Scotland) Premiership	Free
(Wales) Alex Samuel	(Wales) Swansea City	(England) Premier League	Loan
(Scotland) Declan McManus	(England) Fleetwood Town	(England) Football League One	Loan
(Scotland) Andrew McNeil	(Scotland) Alloa Athletic	(Scotland) Championship	Free
(Scotland) Paul McMullan	(Scotland) Celtic	(Scotland) Premiership	Loan

=== Out ===
Player	To	League	Fee
(Scotland) Jamie McCluskey	(Scotland) Stranraer	(Scotland) League One	Free
(Scotland) Sean Crighton	(Scotland) Airdrieonians	(Scotland) League One	Free
(Serbia) Stefan Milojević	(Slovakia) Zlaté Moravce	(Slovakia) Super Liga	Free
(Scotland) Ross Caldwell	(Scotland) Ayr United	(Scotland) League One	Free
(Scotland) Aidan Ferris	(Scotland) BSC Glasgow	(Scotland) Lowland Football League	Free
(France) Nicolas Caraux	(France) Athletic Club de Boulogne-Billancourt	(France) CFA	Free
(Scotland) Craig Knight	(Scotland) Ardrossan Winton Rovers	(Scotland) Scottish Junior Football Ayrshire Division One	Free
(Scotland) Jordan Cairnie	(Scotland) East Stirlingshire	(Scotland) League Two	Loan
(Scotland) Cameron O'Neil	(Scotland) Barrhead YM AFC	(Scotland) Greater Glasgow Premier League	Free
(Netherlands) Romario Sabajo	(Netherlands) VPV Purmersteijn	(Netherlands) Eerste Klasse	Free
(Scotland) Dylan Stevenson	(England) Berwick Rangers	(Scotland) League Two	Loan
(Scotland) Thomas Orr	(Scotland) East Stirlingshire	(Scotland) League Two	Loan
(Scotland) Jamie McGowan	(Scotland) Cumbernauld United	West of Scotland Super League First Division	Loan
(Scotland) Grant Adam	(Scotland) Cowdenbeath	(Scotland) League One	Free
(Scotland) Jordan Cairnie	(Scotland) Kilwinning Rangers	West of Scotland Super League Premier Division	Free
(Scotland) Frank McKeown	(Scotland) Stranraer	(Scotland) League One	Free
(Scotland) Luke Irvine	(Scotland) Ardrossan Winton Rovers	(Scotland) Scottish Junior Football Ayrshire Division One	Free

== Fixtures and results ==
Win Draw Loss Upcoming fixture

=== Pre-season ===
==== Friendlies ====
3 July 2015 Friendly	Dundee	0 – 3	Greenock Morton	Dundee
			Trialist (Romario Sabajo); Joe McKee; Jon Scullion	Stadium: Riverside Pitches; Attendance: Public park

4 July 2015 Friendly	Greenock Morton	4 – 0	Next Level Soccer XI	Port Glasgow
	Trialist; Ross Forbes; Jon Scullion			Stadium: Parklea; Attendance: Public park

7 July 2015 Friendly	BSC Glasgow	2 – 3	Greenock Morton XI	Airdrie
19.15	Ross McKinnon; Chris McDougall	report	Thomas Orr	Stadium: Excelsior Stadium

9 July 2015 Friendly	Clachnacuddin	0 – 0	Greenock Morton	Inverness
19.00		report		Stadium: Grant Street Park

11 July 2015 Friendly	Brora Rangers	0 – 1	Greenock Morton	Brora
15.00		report	Stefan McCluskey	Stadium: Dudgeon Park

13 July 2015 Testimonial match	Greenock Morton	1 – 3	Celtic XI	Greenock
19.30	Thomas Orr	report	Stefan Šćepović; Luke Donnelly; Anthony Stokes	Stadium: Cappielow Park; Attendance: 1,018; Referee: Nick Walsh

15 July 2015 Friendly	Kilmarnock	4 – 0	Greenock Morton	Kilmarnock
	Kris Boyd; Greg Kiltie; Euan Smith			Stadium: Rugby Park; Attendance: Closed door

18 July 2015 Friendly	Greenock Morton	0 – 3	Rotherham United	Greenock
15.00		report	Greg Halford; Lee Frecklington; Jonson Clarke-Harris	Stadium: Cappielow Park; Attendance: 548; Referee: Don Robertson

3 August 2015 Friendly	Rangers XI	1 – 0	Greenock Morton XI	Milngavie
	Fraser Aird			Stadium: Rangers Training Centre; Attendance: Closed door

=== Scottish Championship ===
8 August 2015 1	Greenock Morton	1 – 1	Falkirk	Greenock
15:00	Peter MacDonald 60'	report	Paul Watson 19'	Stadium: Cappielow Park; Attendance: 2,782; Referee: Alan Muir; Man of the Match: Mark Russell

15 August 2015 2	Hibernian	1 – 0	Greenock Morton	Edinburgh
15:00	Jason Cummings 58'	report		Stadium: Easter Road; Attendance: 8,923; Referee: Craig Charleston

21 August 2015 3	Greenock Morton	0 – 0	St Mirren	Greenock
19:45 (live on BBC Alba)		report	Luke Conlan (red card) 55'	Stadium: Cappielow Park; Attendance: 5,343; Referee: Greg Aitken; Man of the Match: Ricki Lamie

29 August 2015 4	Alloa Athletic	0 – 1	Greenock Morton	Alloa
15:00		report	Thomas O'Ware 72'	Stadium: Recreation Park; Attendance: 825; Referee: Nick Walsh

5 September 2015 5	Livingston	2 – 4	Greenock Morton	Livingston
15:00	Ben Gordon (red card) 30'; Jordan White 85'; Jordyn Sheerin 89'	report	Stefan McCluskey 31'; Denny Johnstone 52'; Bobby Barr 66'; Jon Scullion 82'	Stadium: Almondvale Stadium; Attendance: 1,186; Referee: Euan Anderson

12 September 2015 6	Greenock Morton	0 – 0	Dumbarton	Greenock
15:00	Conor Pepper (yellow card) 67' (red card)	report		Stadium: Cappielow Park; Attendance: 2,016; Referee: Stephen Finnie; Man of the Match: Thomas O'Ware

19 September 2015 7	Queen of the South	2 – 2	Greenock Morton	Dumfries
15:00	Derek Lyle 45'; Luca Gasparotto 81' (o.g.)	report	Chris Higgins 7' (o.g.); Denny Johnstone 65'	Stadium: Palmerston Park; Attendance: 1,565; Referee: Andrew Dallas

27 September 2015 8	Greenock Morton	0 – 4	Rangers	Greenock
12:30 (live on BT Sport)		report	Martyn Waghorn 12' (pen.), 22', 81'; James Tavernier 34'	Stadium: Cappielow Park; Attendance: 7,392; Referee: Willie Collum; Man of the Match: Denny Johnstone

3 October 2015 9	Raith Rovers	2 – 1	Greenock Morton	Kirkcaldy
15:00	Mark Stewart 45'; Jason Thomson 90+4'	report	Thomas O'Ware 82'	Stadium: Stark's Park; Attendance: 1,754; Referee: Bobby Madden

10 October 2015 10	Queen of the South	1 – 0	Greenock Morton	Dumfries
15:00	Derek Lyle 14'	report		Stadium: Palmerston Park; Attendance: 1,583; Referee: John McKendrick

17 October 2015 11	Falkirk	1 – 0	Greenock Morton	Grangemouth
15:00	Lee Miller 90+1'	report		Stadium: Falkirk Stadium; Attendance: 3,946; Referee: Euan Anderson

24 October 2015 12	Greenock Morton	1 – 0	Alloa Athletic	Greenock
15:00	Ross Forbes 55'	report		Stadium: Cappielow Park; Attendance: 1,716; Referee: Brian Colvin; Man of the Match: Ross Forbes

31 October 2015 13	Dumbarton	1 – 2	Greenock Morton	Dumbarton
15:00	Darren Barr 53'	report	Joe McKee 41'; Denny Johnstone 85'	Stadium: Dumbarton Football Stadium; Attendance: 1,110; Referee: George Salmond

7 November 2015 14	Greenock Morton	1 – 0	Livingston	Greenock
15:00	Denny Johnstone 6' (pen.)	report		Stadium: Cappielow Park; Attendance: 1,758; Referee: Craig Charleston; Man of the Match: Luca Gasparotto

14 November 2015 15	Greenock Morton	2 – 0	Queen of the South	Greenock
15:00	Denny Johnstone 51', 62'	report		Stadium: Cappielow Park; Attendance: 1,849; Referee: Mat Northcroft; Man of the Match: Denny Johnstone

20 November 2015 16	St Mirren	1 – 1	Greenock Morton	Paisley
19:45 (live on BBC Alba)	Jack Baird 11'	report	Alex Samuel 90'	Stadium: St Mirren Park; Attendance: 4,163; Referee: John Beaton; Man of the Match: Jack Baird

5 December 2015	Greenock Morton	P – P	Hibernian	Greenock
15:00				Stadium: Cappielow Park

12 December 2015 17	Rangers	2 – 2	Greenock Morton	Glasgow
15:00	Kenny Miller 2'; Martyn Waghorn 84'	report	James Tavernier 31' (o.g.); Stefan McCluskey 82'	Stadium: Ibrox Stadium; Attendance: 41,816; Referee: Don Robertson

18 December 2015 18	Greenock Morton	1 – 2	Raith Rovers	Greenock
19:45 (live on BBC Alba)	Alex Samuel 23'	report	Ross Callachan 48'; James Craigen 90' (pen.)	Stadium: Cappielow Park; Attendance: 1,264; Referee: John McKendrick; Man of the Match: Thomas O'Ware

2 January 2016 19	Greenock Morton	0 – 1	St Mirren	Greenock
15:00		report	Lawrence Shankland 39'	Stadium: Cappielow Park; Attendance: 4,736; Referee: Andrew Dallas

16 January 2016	Alloa Athletic	A – A	Greenock Morton	Alloa
15:00				Stadium: Recreation Park; Referee: Alan Muir

25 January 2016 20	Greenock Morton	0 – 2	Rangers	Greenock
19:45 (live on BT Sport)		report	Kenny Miller 26'; Barrie McKay 70'; Andy Halliday (yellow card) 72' (red card)	Stadium: Cappielow Park; Attendance: 5,778; Referee: Barry Cook; Man of the Match: Joe McKee

30 January 2016	Hibernian	P – P	Greenock Morton	Edinburgh
15:00				Stadium: Easter Road

2 February 2016 21	Greenock Morton	0 – 1	Hibernian	Greenock
19:45		report	Anthony Stokes 46'	Stadium: Cappielow Park; Attendance: 2,696; Referee: John McKendrick; Man of the Match: Bobby Barr

9 February 2016 22	Alloa Athletic	2 – 2	Greenock Morton	Alloa
19:30	Colin Hamilton 19'; Dougie Hill 71'	report	Declan McManus 14'; Stefan McCluskey 17'	Stadium: Recreation Park; Attendance: 535; Referee: Alan Muir

13 February 2016 23	Greenock Morton	2 – 0	Dumbarton	Greenock
15:00	Denny Johnstone 64'; Joe McKee 88'	report		Stadium: Cappielow Park; Attendance: 1,595; Referee: George Salmond

20 February 2016 24	Greenock Morton	0 – 1	Falkirk	Greenock
15:00		report	John Baird 27'	Stadium: Cappielow Park; Attendance: 1,911; Referee: Craig Thomson; Man of the Match: Declan McManus

24 February 2016 25	Hibernian	0 – 3	Greenock Morton	Edinburgh
19:45		report	Thomas O'Ware 36'; Denny Johnstone 51'; Ross Forbes 63'	Stadium: Easter Road; Attendance: 8,655; Referee: Steven McLean

27 February 2016 26	Raith Rovers	3 – 2	Greenock Morton	Kirkcaldy
15:00	Rory McKeown 7'; Aidan Connolly 74'; Ryan Hardie 89'	report	Declan McManus 73', 87'	Stadium: Stark's Park; Attendance: 1,633; Referee: Mat Northcroft

1 March 2016 27	Livingston	0 – 0	Greenock Morton	Livingston
19:30		report		Stadium: Almondvale Stadium; Attendance: 787; Referee: Kevin Clancy

5 March 2016	Greenock Morton	P – P	Queen of the South	Greenock
15:00				Stadium: Cappielow Park

11 March 2016 28	Rangers	3 – 1	Greenock Morton	Glasgow
19:45	Kenny Miller 43', 48'; Lee Wallace 56'	report	Denny Johnstone 22'	Stadium: Ibrox Stadium; Attendance: 45,072; Referee: Nick Walsh

15 March 2016 29	Greenock Morton	3 – 2	Queen of the South	Greenock
19:45	Denny Johnstone 8', 22'; Paul McMullan 29'	report	Dale Hilson 69'; Gary Oliver 78'	Stadium: Cappielow Park; Attendance: 1,175; Referee: Don Robertson

19 March 2016 30	Greenock Morton	4 – 1	Alloa Athletic	Greenock
15:00	Jason Marr 15' (o.g.); Declan McManus 78'; Ross Forbes 17'; Denny Johnstone 81'	report	Kyle McAusland 39'	Stadium: Cappielow Park; Attendance: 1,513; Referee: Euan Anderson; Man of the Match: Declan McManus

26 March 2016 31	Greenock Morton	0 – 1	Raith Rovers	Greenock
15:00		Report	James Craigen 53'	Stadium: Cappielow Park; Attendance: 1,778; Referee: Stephen Finnie; Man of the Match: Ross Forbes

2 April 2016 32	Dumbarton	0 – 0	Greenock Morton	Dumbarton
15:00		report		Stadium: Dumbarton Football Stadium; Attendance: 994; Referee: Crawford Allan

9 April 2016 33	Greenock Morton	2 – 1	Livingston	Greenock
15:00	Denny Johnstone 51' (pen.); Thomas O'Ware 82'	report	Jordan White 33'	Stadium: Cappielow Park; Attendance: 1,463; Referee: John McKendrick; Man of the Match: Derek Gaston

16 April 2016 34	St Mirren	3 – 1	Greenock Morton	Paisley
13:00	Lawrence Shankland 7'; Calum Gallagher 62'; Stephen Mallan 90+2'	report	Denny Johnstone 59'	Stadium: St Mirren Park; Attendance: 4,299; Referee: Willie Collum; Man of the Match: Lawrence Shankland

23 April 2016 35	Greenock Morton	0 – 0	Hibernian	Greenock
15:00		report		Stadium: Cappielow Park; Attendance: 2,308; Referee: Stephen Finnie

1 May 2016 36	Falkirk	1 – 0	Greenock Morton	Grangemouth
12:30	John Baird (penalty missed); Paul Watson 48'	report		Stadium: Falkirk Stadium; Attendance: 5,271; Referee: Kevin Clancy

=== Scottish Cup ===
28 November 2015 3rd Round	Albion Rovers	0 – 2	Greenock Morton	Coatbridge
15.00		report	Denny Johnstone 41'; Joe McKee 88'	Stadium: Cliftonhill Stadium; Attendance: 505; Referee: Greg Aitken

9 January 2016 4th Round	Livingston	0 – 1	Greenock Morton	Livingston
15.00		report	Thomas O'Ware 64'	Stadium: Almondvale Stadium; Attendance: 873; Referee: Craig Charleston

6 February 2016 5th Round	Annan Athletic	1 – 4	Greenock Morton	Annan
15.00	Matt Flynn 76'	report	Stefan McCluskey 21', 65', 68'; Joe McKee 45+2'	Stadium: Galabank; Attendance: 756; Referee: John Beaton

6 March 2016 Quarter-final	Celtic	3 – 0	Greenock Morton	Glasgow
12.00 (live on Sky Sports)	Leigh Griffiths 14'; Gary Mackay-Steven 25'; Callum McGregor 35'	report		Stadium: Celtic Park; Attendance: 14,858; Referee: Willie Collum; Man of the Match: Kieran Tierney

=== Scottish League Cup ===
1 August 2015 1st Round	Greenock Morton	5 – 0	Elgin City	Greenock
15.00	Stefan McCluskey 48'; Denny Johnstone 68'; Jon Scullion 70', 83'; Ross Forbes 74' (pen.)	report		Stadium: Cappielow Park; Attendance: 1,052; Referee: Barry Cook

25 August 2015 2nd Round	Queen of the South	0 – 1	Greenock Morton	Dumfries
19.45		report	Ross Forbes 69'	Stadium: Palmerston Park; Attendance: 1,034; Referee: Andrew Dallas

22 September 2015 3rd Round	Greenock Morton	3 – 2 AET	Motherwell	Greenock
19.45	Alex Samuel 11', 100'; Michael Tidser 112'	report	Scott McDonald 90+3'; Louis Moult 116'	Stadium: Cappielow Park; Attendance: 2,539; Referee: Greg Aitken; Man of the Match: Alex Samuel

27 October 2015 Quarter-final	Greenock Morton	1 – 3	St Johnstone	Greenock
19.45	Denny Johnstone 52'	report	Steven MacLean 61' (pen.); Michael O'Halloran 63'; Chris Kane 83'	Stadium: Cappielow Park; Attendance: 2,433; Referee: Craig Thomson

=== Scottish Challenge Cup ===
25 July 2015 1st Round South	Greenock Morton	2 – 3	Dumbarton	Greenock
15:00	Lee Kilday 73'; Peter MacDonald 83' (pen.)	report	Grant Gallagher 6', 30'; Garry Fleming 65'	Stadium: Cappielow Park; Attendance: 1,418; Referee: Craig Charleston

=== Development squad ===
==== Friendlies ====
24 July 2015 Friendly	Greenock Juniors	0 – 3	Greenock Morton	Greenock
19.30		Greenock Telegraph report	Trialist (Chris Duggan); Jordan Cairnie	Stadium: Ravenscraig Stadium; Attendance: 200-300

==== Development League West ====
1 September 2015 1	Greenock Morton	3 – 5	Queen of the South	Greenock
19.30	Romario Sabajo; Thomas Orr		Aidan Smith; Scott Hooper (yellow card) (red card); Jake Pickard	Stadium: Cappielow Park; Referee: William Wilson

9 September 2015 2	Greenock Morton	3 – 1	Clyde	Greenock
19.30	Thomas Orr; Scott Tiffoney; Alex McWaters	Greenock Telegraph report	Jonathan Reynolds	Stadium: Cappielow Park; Referee: Calum Scott

15 September 2015 3	Greenock Morton	5 – 1	Queen's Park	Greenock
19.30	Jon Scullion; Thomas Orr; Cameron O'Neil; Lewis Strapp	Greenock Telegraph report	Grant Brennan	Stadium: Cappielow Park; Referee: David Dickinson

29 September 2015 4	Greenock Morton	3 – 1	Dumbarton	Greenock
19.30	Jon Scullion; Jai Quitongo; Alex McWaters	Greenock Telegraph report	Jordan Kirkpatrick (penalty missed); Trialist	Stadium: Cappielow Park; Referee: Chris Graham

6 October 2015 5	Greenock Morton	2 – 2	Stranraer	Greenock
19.45	Jon Scullion; Jai Quitongo	Greenock Telegraph report	Kieran McLaughlin; Calvin Kemp	Stadium: Cappielow Park; Referee: Craig Napier

13 October 2015 6	Greenock Morton	2 – 1	Ayr United	Greenock
19.30	Thomas Orr; Ruaridh Langan		Ryan Nisbet	Stadium: Cappielow Park; Referee: Garry Doherty

20 October 2015 7	Airdrieonians	1 – 3	Greenock Morton	Airdrie
20.00	?	NO REPORT AVAILABLE	Thomas Orr ? (o.g.)	Stadium: Excelsior Stadium; Referee: Steven Reid

5 November 2015 8	Queen of the South	0 – 3	Greenock Morton	Dumfries
20.00		GMFC report	Alex McWaters; Scott Tiffoney; Thomas Orr (pen.)	Stadium: Palmerston Park; Referee: Lloyd Wilson

10 November 2015 9	Clyde	3 – 3	Greenock Morton	Cumbernauld
19.15	?	GMFC report	Jon Scullion; John Tennent	Stadium: Broadwood Stadium (outdoor pitch); Referee: David Dickinson

16 November 2015	Queen's Park	P – P	Greenock Morton	Glasgow
19.15				Stadium: Lesser Hampden; Referee: William Wilson

30 November 2015 10	Stranraer	0 – 4	Greenock Morton	Stranraer
20.00	Calvin Kemp (red card)	GMFC Twitter	Alex McWaters; Scott Tiffoney	Stadium: Stranraer Academy; Referee: Calum Haswell

2 December 2015 11	Queen's Park	0 – 3	Greenock Morton	Glasgow
20.00		Greenock Telegraph report	Thomas Orr; Romario Sabajo	Stadium: Lesser Hampden; Referee: William Wilson

15 December 2015 12	Ayr United	0 – 2	Greenock Morton	Ayr
19.30		AUFA report	Alex Samuel; Ruaridh Langan	Stadium: Somerset Park; Referee: Craig Napier

18 January 2016	Dumbarton	P – P	Greenock Morton	Milngavie
20.00				Stadium: Rangers Training Centre

28 January 2016	Greenock Morton	P – P	Airdrieonians	Greenock
19.45				Stadium: Cappielow Park; Referee: Chris Graham

4 February 2016 13	Greenock Morton	4 – 0	Queen of the South	Port Glasgow
13.30	Jai Quitongo; Thomas Orr; Ricki Lamie; Jon Scullion	Greenock Telegraph report		Stadium: Port Glasgow Community Stadium; Referee: Matthew MacDermid

9 February 2016	Clyde	P – P	Greenock Morton	Cumbernauld
				Stadium: Broadwood Stadium (outdoor pitch)

16 February 2016 14	Greenock Morton	3 – 0	Queen's Park	Lennoxtown
19.30	Jai Quitongo; Jon Scullion; Ruaridh Langan			Stadium: Lennoxtown training centre Referee: Craig King

22 February 2016 15	Dumbarton	1 – 1	Greenock Morton	Milngavie
20.00	Andrew Biddulph	NO REPORT AVAILABLE	Alex McWaters	Stadium: Rangers Training Centre; Referee: Daniel McFarlane

29 February 2016 16	Dumbarton	3 – 3	Greenock Morton	Milngavie
20.00	Trialist (Sebastian Osei-Obengo); Kler Heh ? (red card); Mikey Hopkins	NO REPORT AVAILABLE	Jai Quitongo; Jon Scullion	Stadium: Rangers Training Centre

8 March 2016 17	Greenock Morton	3 – 3	Stranraer	Lennoxtown
20.00	Jon Scullion; Jai Quitongo; Ruaridh Langan	Greenock Telegraph report	Zach Simpson; Kyle Turner (penalty missed); Kieran McLaughlin	Stadium: Lennoxtown training centre Referee: William Wilson

21 March 2016 18	Airdrieonians	5 – 5	Greenock Morton	Airdrie
20.00	Goal	Greenock Telegraph report	Jon Scullion; Scott Tiffoney; Ruaridh Langan; Alex McWaters	Stadium: Excelsior Stadium; Referee: David Dickinson

24 March 2016 19	Clyde	1 – 3	Greenock Morton	Cumbernauld
18.15	Goal	GMFC Twitter	Jai Quitongo; Ruaridh Langan; Alex McWaters	Stadium: Broadwood Stadium (outdoor pitch); Referee: William Wilson

28 March 2016 20	Greenock Morton	1 – 1	Ayr United	Greenock
19.30	Jon Scullion	Greenock Telegraph report	Ryan Nisbet (pen.)	Stadium: Cappielow Park; Referee: Stephen Brown

31 March 2016 21	Greenock Morton	3 – 2	Airdrieonians	Greenock
19.30	Luke Irvine; Alex McWaters	Greenock Telegraph report	Conor McLaughlin; Aaron Ross	Stadium: Cappielow Park; Referee: Chris Graham

==== Scottish Youth Cup ====
1 November 2015 3rd Round	Forfar Athletic	0 – 2	Greenock Morton	Forfar
13.00	Cameron Clark (penalty missed)	GMFC Highlights	Thomas Orr (pen.); Jai Quitongo	Stadium: Station Park; Referee: Steven Traynor

22 November 2015 4th Round	Greenock Morton	1 – 2	Ross County	Greenock
14.00	Thomas Orr	GMFC report	Sam Morrison; Greg Morrison	Stadium: Cappielow Park; Referee: Chris McTiernan

== League table ==
Pos	Team	Pld	W	D	L	GF	GA	GD	Pts	Promotion, qualification or relegation
3	Hibernian	36	21	7	8	59	34	+25	70	Qualification for the Europa League second qualifying round and for the Premiership play-off quarter-finals (Note: Hibernian qualified for the Europa League second qualifying round by winning the 2015–16 Scottish Cup.)
4	Raith Rovers	36	18	8	10	52	46	+6	62	Qualification for the Premiership play-off quarter-finals
5	Greenock Morton	36	11	10	15	39	42	−3	43	
6	St Mirren	36	11	9	16	44	53	−9	42	
7	Queen of the South	36	12	6	18	46	56	−10	42	

Source: Soccerway
Rules for classification: 1) Points; 2) Goal difference; 3) Number of goals scored

== Player statistics ==
As of 1 May 2016

=== All competitions ===
Position	Player	Starts	Subs	Unused subs	Goals	Red cards (red card)	Yellow cards (yellow card)
GK	(Scotland) Grant Adam	10	1	11	0	0	0
MF	(Scotland) Bobby Barr	37	5	1	1	0	8
DF	(Scotland) Jordan Cairnie	0	1	8	0	0	0
GK	(Scotland) Greig Connor	0	0	1	0	0	0
MF	(Scotland) Ross Forbes	40	5	0	5	0	5
DF	(Canada) Luca Gasparotto (on loan from Rangers)	23	2	2	0	0	1
GK	(Scotland) Derek Gaston	33	0	3	0	0	0
FW	(Scotland) Denny Johnstone (on loan from Birmingham City)	42	1	0	17	0	0
DF	(Scotland) Lee Kilday	41	1	2	1	0	6
DF	(Scotland) Ricki Lamie	19	6	11	0	0	4
MF	(Scotland) Ruaridh Langan	0	0	1	0	0	0
FW	(Scotland) Peter MacDonald	6	5	7	2	0	0
GK	(Scotland) Jamie McGowan	1	0	16	0	0	0
MF / FW	(Scotland) Stefan McCluskey	30	7	1	7	0	5
MF	(Scotland) Joe McKee	26	5	5	4	0	7
DF	(Scotland) Frank McKeown	0	1	0	0	0	0
FW	(Scotland) Declan McManus (on loan from Fleetwood Town)	20	0	0	4	0	8
FW	(Scotland) Paul McMullan (on loan from Celtic)	6	5	1	1	0	1
GK	(Scotland) Andrew McNeil	1	0	13	0	0	0
FW	(Scotland) Alex McWaters	0	0	1	0	0	0
DF / MF	(Scotland) Michael Miller	27	4	11	0	0	6
DF / MF	(Scotland) Thomas O'Ware	40	1	0	5	0	4
FW	(Scotland) Thomas Orr	1	5	13	0	0	0
DF / MF	(Republic of Ireland) Conor Pepper	29	1	2	0	1	6
FW	(Scotland) Jai Quitongo	0	7	7	0	0	0
DF	(Scotland) Mark Russell	35	1	1	0	0	3
MF / FW	(Netherlands) Romario Sabajo	4	5	4	0	0	0
FW	(Wales) Alex Samuel (on loan from Swansea City)	9	21	0	4	0	2
FW	(Scotland) Jon Scullion	2	9	29	3	0	0
MF	(Scotland) Dylan Stevenson	0	5	13	0	0	0
DF	(Scotland) Lewis Strapp	0	0	2	0	0	0
DF	(Scotland) John Tennent	0	1	11	0	0	0
MF	(Scotland) Michael Tidser	12	7	2	1	0	3
FW	(Scotland) Scott Tiffoney	0	0	2	0	0	0

=== Development squad goalscorers ===
Including goals from the Development League West (champions) and SFA Youth Cup

- Thomas Orr - 14
- Jon Scullion - 12
- Alex McWaters - 11
- Jai Quitongo - 9
- Ruaridh Langan - 6
- Scott Tiffoney - 4
- Romario Sabajo - 2
- Cameron O'Neil, Lewis Strapp, Luke Irvine, Ricki Lamie, John Tennent & Alex Samuel - 1

=== Awards ===
Last updated 14 March 2016

Nation	Name	Award	Month
(Scotland)	Declan McManus	Championship Player of the Month	February 2016
