= 2014–15 Greenock Morton F.C. season =

Greenock Morton
2014-15 season
- Chairman: Douglas Rae
- Manager: Jim Duffy
- Stadium: Cappielow Park
- League One: Champions
- Challenge Cup: Quarter final (lost to Alloa Athletic)
- League Cup: 2nd round (lost to Partick Thistle)
- Scottish Cup: 4th round (lost to Spartans)
- Top goalscorer: League: Declan McManus (20 goals); All: Declan McManus (23 goals)
- Highest home attendance: League: 6,024 v Peterhead; Cup: 2,811 v St Mirren
- Lowest home attendance: League: 1,037 v Stirling Albion; Cup: 906 v Berwick Rangers
- Average home league attendance: 1,728
| Home colours | Away colours |

Season 2014–15 saw Greenock Morton compete in the Scottish League One the third tier of Scottish football, having finished bottom of the Scottish Championship in 2013–14. Morton will also compete in the Challenge Cup, Scottish League Cup and the Scottish Cup.

Morton won the championship on the final day of the regular season, on 2 May 2015, with a 3–1 victory over Peterhead.

== Story of the season ==
=== May ===
Kenny Shiels resigned as manager at the end of the previous season.

Marc Fitzpatrick left the club to look for a part-time club.

Morton appointed Clyde manager Jim Duffy as the replacement for Kenny Shiels. Duffy signed a two-year contract with the club.

Young defender Nicky Jamieson left to take up an accountancy apprenticeship with Ernst & Young.

Ten of the club's youth players signed new full-time contracts. Luke Irvine, Steven Lamont and Aidan Ferris were given six-month extensions, while Jordan Cairnie, Cameron O'Neil, Craig Knight, Lewis McIntyre, John Tennant, Dylan Stevenson and Thomas Orr penned two-year deals.

Derek Gaston agreed a new one-year deal with the club. Thomas O'Ware followed suit.

=== June ===
Ex-Ton midfielder Craig McPherson signed a two-year contract to become Jim Duffy's assistant.

Captain Dougie Imrie left the club to re-join Hamilton Academical after turning down a contract extension.

Morton re-signed Mark Russell on a two-year deal, whilst Stefan Milojević and Conor Pepper verbally agreed terms.

Scott Taggart left the club after rejecting a new deal.

Morton agreed terms with two more players, Michael Miller from Celtic, and ex-Hamilton Accies defender Lee Kilday. Kilday signed, along with Sean Crighton who was already working at the club as a youth coach.

Stefan Milojević, Conor Pepper and Stefan McCluskey all signed for the club.

Andrew Barrowman started training with the club.

=== July ===
Morton were drawn against Lowland Football League champions Spartans in the first round of the Scottish Challenge Cup.

Barrowman became the first new striker to sign with the club.

Morton received a second home cup tie of the season with a game against Berwick Rangers.

Morton defeated Viewfield Rovers 13–1 to confirm their place in the Renfrewshire Cup final. Barrowman scored a hat-trick, with Mark Russell and Joe McKee getting braces.

Morton signed trialist duo Jordan Allan and Ricki Lamie, as well as re-signing David McNeil, on short-term contracts.

Ex-St Mirren youth striker Jon Scullion signed a 6-month contract with the club.

After defeating Spartans in the first round, Morton received another home tie against Berwick Rangers in the second round of the Challenge Cup.

Stefan McCluskey's brother Jamie signed on a one-month contract, rejecting offers from India and Cyprus.

=== August ===
Morton drew Partick Thistle at home in the second round of the League Cup.

Declan McManus signed on loan from Aberdeen until 6 January 2015.

Fouad Bachirou made a move to Swedish second-tier side Östersunds FK for an undisclosed fee.

After defeating Berwick in extra time in round 2, Morton were given a fifth successive home tie with a quarter final clash against Alloa Athletic.

Jamie McCluskey signed a contract extension to tie him to the club until the end of the season.

=== September ===
Morton signed Rangers midfielder Robbie Crawford on a four-month loan spell.

Declan McManus received his first call-up to the Scotland U21 side.

Aidan Fulton was officially released by the club after failing to win a deal over the summer.

=== October ===
Aidan Ferris was loaned out to Lowland League side BSC Glasgow.

In the Scottish Cup third round, drawn by Billy Connolly, Morton were given a home tie against Airdrieonians; whilst they were drawn away to Raith Rovers in the Scottish Youth Cup.

Third-choice goalkeeper Lewis McIntyre asked to be released from his contract.

=== November ===
After defeating Raith 5–0, Morton were given a home draw in the fourth round of the Scottish Youth Cup.

Defender Luke Irvine (18) and goalkeeper Jamie McGowan (17) signed new 18-month contracts with the club's development squad.

Morton were eliminated from the Scottish Cup at the fourth round stage by Spartans; this was their first ever defeat against non-league opposition.

=== December ===
Grant Adam was brought in as a trialist after injuries to Derek Gaston and Nicolas Caraux.

Morton were eliminated on penalties from the Scottish Youth Cup by bogey side Queen's Park.

Jim Duffy was named as League One manager of the month for November 2014.

Jon Scullion and Ricki Lamie were given contract extensions until the end of the season.

=== January ===
Reece Hands was released by mutual consent.

Morton signed trialist goalkeeper Grant Adam as well as strikers Peter MacDonald and Ross Caldwell.

Andrew Barrowman was also released by mutual consent to sign for Dunfermline Athletic in a swap deal with Ross Forbes.

Aidan Ferris was given a contract until the end of the season after returning from a successful loan spell in Glasgow, Steven Lamont from the under-20s squad was also released, as were Jordan Allan and David McNeil.

David Hopkin left his post as reserve team manager to become assistant head coach at Livingston to Mark Burchill.

18 months after leaving for £50,000, Michael Tidser returned to the club on a free transfer, signing a 2 1/2-year contract. FIFA rules prevent him from playing for the club until next season however as he has already played for Rotherham and Oldham this season.

=== February ===
Top scorer Declan McManus returned on loan for the rest of the season after failing to get any playing time back at Pittodrie.

Captain Peter MacDonald was ruled out after undergoing a back procedure to alleviate the pain of a bulging disc.

Gary McCann of junior side Irvine Meadow played as a trialist against Ayr United U20s.

Morton came to agreements with several junior sides to farm the development squad out to get first team experience whilst still being eligible to play for the U20s during the week.

=== March ===
Another two youngsters went out on loan to junior sides.

Luke Irvine also joined Port Glasgow on loan.

Mark Russell was told by the chairman that he would be offered a new improved contract.

=== April ===
Declan McManus was nominated for PFA Scotland League One Player of the Year.

Morton finished third in the Development League West with a victory over Queens Park, and the U17s won the Club Academy Scotland U16/17 South/West League with a 3–1 win against Ayr United.

=== May ===
Declan McManus and Mark Russell were announced as being included in the PFA Scotland League One Team of the Year.

Morton finished the season as champions, defeating Peterhead by three goals to one; goals being scored by Mark Russell, Declan McManus and Michael Miller

McManus won the PFA Scotland League One Player of the Year award.

== First team transfers ==
- From end of 2013–14 season, to last match of season 2014–15

=== In ===
| Player | Last club | League | Fee |
|---|---|---|---|
| (Scotland) Michael Miller | (Scotland) Celtic | Scottish Premiership | Free |
| (Scotland) Lee Kilday | (Scotland) Hamilton Academical | Scottish Premiership | Free |
| (Scotland) Sean Crighton | (Scotland) Elgin City | Scottish League Two | Free |
| (Serbia) Stefan Milojević | (Scotland) Airdrieonians | Scottish League One | Free |
| (Republic of Ireland) Conor Pepper | (Scotland) Inverness Caledonian Thistle | Scottish Premiership | Free |
| (Scotland) Stefan McCluskey | (Scotland) Clyde | Scottish League Two | Free |
| (Scotland) Andrew Barrowman | (Scotland) Livingston | Scottish Championship | Free |
| (Scotland) Jordan Allan | (Scotland) Dundee United | Scottish Premiership | Free |
| (Scotland) Ricki Lamie | (Scotland) Airdrieonians | Scottish League One | Free |
| (Scotland) Jon Scullion | (Scotland) St Mirren | Scottish Premiership | Free |
| (Scotland) Jamie McCluskey | (Scotland) Forfar Athletic | Scottish League One | Free |
| (Scotland) Declan McManus | (Scotland) Aberdeen | Scottish Premiership | Loan |
| (Scotland) Robbie Crawford | (Scotland) Rangers | Scottish Championship | Loan |
| (Scotland) Grant Adam | (Scotland) Dundee | Scottish Premiership | Free |
| (Scotland) Ross Caldwell | (Scotland) St Mirren | Scottish Premiership | Free |
| (Scotland) Peter MacDonald | (Scotland) Dundee | Scottish Premiership | Free |
| (Scotland) Ross Forbes | (Scotland) Dunfermline Athletic | Scottish League One | Swap with Andrew Barrowman |
| (Scotland) Michael Tidser | (England) Rotherham United | Football League Championship | Free |
| (Scotland) Declan McManus | (Scotland) Aberdeen | Scottish Premiership | Loan |

=== Out ===
| Player | To | League | Fee |
|---|---|---|---|
| (Scotland) Marc Fitzpatrick | (Scotland) Airdrieonians | Scottish League One | Free |
| (Scotland) Nicky Jamieson | (Scotland) Largs Thistle | Super League First Division | Free |
| (Scotland) David Robertson | (Scotland) Livingston | Scottish Championship | Free |
| (Scotland) Dougie Imrie | (Scotland) Hamilton Academical | Scottish Premiership | Free |
| (Scotland) Darren Cole | (Scotland) Livingston | Scottish Championship | Free |
| (Scotland) Jamie McCormack | (Scotland) Brechin City | Scottish League One | Free |
| (Scotland) Garry O'Connor | (Scotland) Selkirk | Lowland Football League | Free |
| (England) Rowan Vine | (England) Welling United | Conference Premier | Free |
| (Scotland) Tony Wallace | (Scotland) BSC Glasgow | Lowland Football League | Free |
| (Scotland) David O'Brien | | | Retired |
| (England) Ben Sampayo | (England) Grays Athletic | Isthmian League Premier Division | Free |
| (Scotland) David Verlaque | (Scotland) Clydebank | West of Scotland Super League Premier Division | Free |
| (Scotland) Scott Taggart | (Scotland) Dumbarton | Scottish Championship | Free |
| (Scotland) Archie Campbell | (Scotland) Dumbarton | Scottish Championship | Free |
| (Scotland) Adam Asghar | (Scotland) Alloa Athletic | Scottish Championship | Free |
| (Comoros) Fouad Bachirou | (Sweden) Östersunds FK | Superettan | Undisclosed |
| (Scotland) Aidan Fulton | | | Free |
| (Scotland) Aidan Ferris | (Scotland) BSC Glasgow | Lowland Football League | Loan |
| (Scotland) Jack Smith | (Scotland) Arbroath | Scottish League Two | Free |
| (Scotland) Lewis McIntyre | | | Free |
| (Scotland) David McNeil | (Scotland) Greenock Juniors | West of Scotland Super League First Division | Free |
| (England) Reece Hands | | | Free |
| (Scotland) Andrew Barrowman | (Scotland) Dunfermline Athletic | Scottish League One | Swap with Ross Forbes |
| (Scotland) Steven Lamont | (Scotland) Stenhousemuir | Scottish League One | Free |
| (Scotland) Jordan Allan | (Scotland) Montrose | Scottish League Two | Free |
| (Scotland) Jordan Cairnie | (Scotland) Ardrossan Winton Rovers | Scottish Junior Football Ayrshire Division One | Loan |
| (Scotland) Dylan Stevenson | (Scotland) Dalry Thistle | Scottish Junior Football Ayrshire Division One | Loan |
| (Scotland) John Tennent | (Scotland) Dalry Thistle | Scottish Junior Football Ayrshire Division One | Loan |
| (Scotland) Craig Knight | (Scotland) Port Glasgow | Scottish Junior Football Central Division Two | Loan |
| (Scotland) Luke Irvine | (Scotland) Port Glasgow | Scottish Junior Football Central Division Two | Loan |

== Squad (that played for first team) ==
Note: Flags indicate national team as defined under FIFA eligibility rules; some limited exceptions apply. Players may hold more than one non-FIFA nationality.

| No. | Pos. | Nation | Player |
|---|---|---|---|
| — | GK | SCO | Grant Adam |
| — | GK | FRA | Nicolas Caraux |
| — | GK | SCO | Derek Gaston (vice-captain) |
| — | GK | SCO | Jamie McGowan |
| — | DF | SCO | Jordan Allan (released mid-season) |
| — | DF | SCO | Sean Crighton |
| — | DF | SCO | Lee Kilday |
| — | DF | SCO | Ricki Lamie |
| — | DF | SCO | Michael Miller |
| — | DF | SCO | Stefan Milojević |
| — | DF | SCO | Thomas O'Ware |
| — | DF | SCO | Mark Russell |
| — | MF | SCO | Robbie Crawford (on loan from Rangers) |
| — | MF | EIR | Ross Forbes |
| — | MF | ENG | Reece Hands (released mid-season) |

| No. | Pos. | Nation | Player |
|---|---|---|---|
| — | MF | SCO | Jamie McCluskey |
| — | MF | SCO | Joe McKee |
| — | MF | SCO | Cameron O'Neil |
| — | MF | EIR | Conor Pepper |
| — | MF | SCO | Dylan Stevenson |
| — | FW | SCO | Andrew Barrowman (released mid-season) |
| — | FW | SCO | Jordan Cairnie |
| — | FW | SCO | Ross Caldwell |
| — | FW | SCO | Aidan Ferris |
| — | FW | SCO | Peter MacDonald (Captain) |
| — | FW | SCO | Stefan McCluskey |
| — | FW | SCO | Declan McManus (on loan from Aberdeen) |
| — | FW | SCO | David McNeil (released mid-season) |
| — | FW | SCO | Thomas Orr |
| — | FW | SCO | Jon Scullion |

== Fixtures and results ==
Win Draw Loss Upcoming fixture

=== Pre-season ===
==== Friendlies ====
| 5 July 2014 Friendly | Greenock Morton | 0 – 1 | Queen of the South | Croy |
| | | Report | Michael Paton 10' | Stadium: Broadwood Stadium; Attendance: Closed doors Referee: David Watt |

| 8 July 2014 Friendly | Greenock Morton | 1 – 1 | Motherwell | Greenock |
| | | | | Stadium: Cappielow Park; Attendance: Closed doors |

| 12 July 2014 Friendly | Greenock Morton | 0 – 1 | (England) Rotherham United | Greenock |
| 15:00 | | report | Kieran Agard 29' | Stadium: Cappielow Park; Attendance: 598 |

| 16 July 2014 Friendly | Partick Thistle | 0 – 1 | Greenock Morton | Glasgow |
| | | | | Stadium: Garscube Sports Complex; Attendance: Public park |

| 23 July 2014 Friendly | Celtic | 3 – 0 | Greenock Morton | Glasgow |
| | | | | Stadium: Lennoxtown training centre Attendance: Closed door |

| 3 August 2014 Friendly | Scotland | 3 – 0 | Greenock Morton | Bishopton |
| 15:00 | | | | Stadium: Mar Hall; Attendance: Public park |

==== Renfrewshire Cup ====
| 14 July 2014 Semi-Final | Greenock Morton | 13 – 1 | Viewfield Rovers | Greenock |
| 19:00 | Andrew Barrowman 7', 12', 45'; Joe McKee 25', 43'; Dylan Stevenson 38'; Stefan McCluskey 52'; Jordan Cairnie 57'; Reece Hands 62'; Zoltan Istvan 68' (o.g.); Mark Russell 72', 84'; Jon Scullion 89' | report | Craig Brown 72' | Stadium: Cappielow Park |

| 19 July 2014 Final | Greenock Morton | 0 – 1 | St Mirren | Greenock |
| 15:00 | | report | Jason Naismith 76' | Stadium: Cappielow Park; Attendance: 2,811 |

=== Scottish League One ===
| 9 August 2014 1 | Ayr United | 1 – 0 | Greenock Morton | Ayr |
| 15:00 | Ryan Donnelly 79' | report | Jordan Allan (red card) 68' | Stadium: Somerset Park; Attendance: 1,617; Referee: Craig Charleston |

| 16 August 2014 2 | Greenock Morton | 4 – 0 | Stranraer | Greenock |
| 15:00 | Declan McManus 19' (pen.) 45'; Jamie McCluskey 32'; Conor Pepper 56' | report | David Mitchell (red card) 18'; Barry Russell (yellow card) 77' (red card) | Stadium: Cappielow Park; Attendance: 1,314; Referee: Greg Aitken |

| 23 August 2014 3 | Peterhead | 1 – 2 | Greenock Morton | Peterhead |
| 15:00 | Rory McAllister 66' (pen.) (yellow card) 88' (red card) | report | Stefan Milojević 47'; Thomas O'Ware 90+2' | Stadium: Balmoor Stadium; Attendance: 708; Referee: Euan Anderson |

| 30 August 2014 4 | Forfar Athletic | 3 – 2 | Greenock Morton | Forfar |
| 15:00 | Gavin Swankie 19', 71'; Danny Denholm 53' | report | Declan McManus 37'; Reece Hands 89' | Stadium: Station Park; Attendance: 704; Referee: Crawford Allan |

| 13 September 2014 5 | Greenock Morton | 2 – 1 | Airdrieonians | Greenock |
| 15:00 | Andrew Barrowman 51'; Robbie Crawford 69' | report | Liam Watt 15' | Stadium: Cappielow Park; Attendance: 1,482; Referee: Kevin Graham; Man of the Match: Conor Pepper |

| 20 September 2014 6 | Greenock Morton | 2 – 1 | Dunfermline Athletic | Greenock |
| 15:00 | Declan McManus 29'; Conor Pepper 76' | report | Ross Millen 72' (pen.) | Stadium: Cappielow Park; Attendance: 1,934; Referee: Nick Walsh; Man of the Match: Ricki Lamie |

| 27 September 2014 7 | Stenhousemuir | 2 – 1 | Greenock Morton | Stenhousemuir |
| 15:00 | Martin Grehan 32'; Sean Dickson 48' | report | Declan McManus 31' | Stadium: Ochilview Park; Attendance: 692; Referee: Alan Muir |

| 4 October 2014 8 | Brechin City | 3 – 1 | Greenock Morton | Brechin |
| 15:00 | Alan Trouten 11' (pen.); Robert Thomson 33'; Kyle McAusland 62' | report | Thomas O'Ware 69' | Stadium: Glebe Park; Attendance: 557; Referee: Barry Cook |

| 11 October 2014 9 | Greenock Morton | 2 – 0 | Stirling Albion | Greenock |
| 13:00 | Andrew Barrowman 33'; David McNeil 85' | report | | Stadium: Cappielow Park; Attendance: 1,225; Referee: Mat Northcroft; Man of the Match: Joe McKee |

| 18 October 2014 10 | Greenock Morton | 0 – 1 | Ayr United | Greenock |
| 15:00 | | report | Scott McLaughlin 36' | Stadium: Cappielow Park; Attendance: 1,744; Referee: Calum Murray; Man of the Match: Thomas O'Ware |

| 25 October 2014 11 | Dunfermline Athletic | 1 – 2 | Greenock Morton | Dunfermline |
| 15:00 | Fayssal El-Bakhtaoui 52' | report | Thomas O'Ware 79'; Declan McManus 90+3' | Stadium: East End Park; Attendance: 3,342; Referee: John McKendrick |

| 8 November 2014 12 | Greenock Morton | 2 – 0 | Forfar Athletic | Greenock |
| 15:00 | Jon Scullion 15'; Andrew Barrowman 62' | report | Jim Paterson (red card) 88' | Stadium: Cappielow Park; Attendance: 1,244; Referee: Greg Aitken; Man of the Match: Jon Scullion |

| 15 November 2014 13 | Airdrieonians | 0 – 1 | Greenock Morton | Airdrie |
| 15:00 | | report | Jamie McCluskey 40' | Stadium: Excelsior Stadium; Attendance: 949; Referee: Gavin Duncan |

| 22 November 2014 14 | Greenock Morton | 3 – 1 | Stenhousemuir | Greenock |
| 15:00 | Lee Kilday 15', 35'; Stefan McCluskey 87' | report | Sean Dickson 68' | Stadium: Cappielow Park; Attendance: 1,315; Referee: Kevin Graham |

| 6 December 2014 15 | Stranraer | 2 – 0 | Greenock Morton | Stranraer |
| 15:00 | Craig Malcolm 30', 46' | report | Sean Crighton (yellow card) 59' (red card); Conor Pepper (yellow card) 85' (red card) | Stadium: Stair Park; Attendance: 321; Referee: Gavin Ross |

| 13 December 2014 16 | Greenock Morton | 2 – 2 | Brechin City | Greenock |
| 15:00 | Jamie McCluskey 64'; Declan McManus 90+2' (pen.) | report | Andy Jackson 9'; Jamie Masson 18' | Stadium: Cappielow Park; Attendance: 1,108; Referee: Stephen Finnie |

| 20 December 2014 17 | Greenock Morton | 0 – 1 | Peterhead | Greenock |
| 15:00 | | report | Jamie Stevenson 45' | Stadium: Cappielow Park; Attendance: 1,098; Referee: Gavin Ross; Man of the Match: Declan McManus |

| 27 December 2014 18 | Stirling Albion | 3 – 4 | Greenock Morton | Stirling |
| 15:00 | Sandy Cunningham 3'; Ross McGeachie 30'; Angus Beith 59'; Callum Reidford (red card) 90+3' | report | Joe McKee 28'; Declan McManus 75', 81'; Craig Wedderburn 79' (o.g.) | Stadium: Forthbank Stadium; Attendance: 931; Referee: Craig Charleston |

| 3 January 2015 19 | Greenock Morton | 0 – 1 | Airdrieonians | Greenock |
| 15:00 | | report | Jim Lister 46' | Stadium: Cappielow Park; Attendance: 1,712; Referee: Nick Walsh |

| 10 January 2015 20 | Stenhousemuir | 2 – 3 | Greenock Morton | Stenhousemuir |
| 15:00 | Colin McMenamin 50', 88' (pen.) | report | Stefan McCluskey 52'; Thomas O'Ware 59'; Ross Caldwell 63' | Stadium: Ochilview Park; Attendance: 508; Referee: John McKendrick |

| 17 January 2015 21 | Ayr United | 1 – 1 | Greenock Morton | Ayr |
| 15:00 | Morgyn Neill 37' | report | Peter MacDonald 46' | Stadium: Somerset Park; Attendance: 1,217; Referee: Colin Steven; Man of the Match: Robbie Crawford (Ayr) |

| 24 January 2015 22 | Greenock Morton | 2 – 0 | Dunfermline Athletic | Greenock |
| 17.30 (BBC Alba) | Ross Caldwell 67'; Peter MacDonald 81' | report | | Stadium: Cappielow Park; Attendance: 1,447; Referee: Alan Muir; Man of the Match: Mark Russell (club); Peter MacDonald (BBC Alba) |

| 31 January 2015 23 | Forfar Athletic | 1 – 2 | Greenock Morton | Forfar |
| 15:00 | Danny Denholm 65' | report | Joe McKee 33'; Peter MacDonald 70' | Stadium: Station Park; Attendance: 595; Referee: Alan Newlands |

| 7 February 2015 | Greenock Morton | P – P | Stirling Albion | Greenock |
| | | | | Stadium: Cappielow Park |

| 14 February 2015 24 | Brechin City | 1 – 1 | Greenock Morton | Brechin |
| 15:00 | Robert Thomson 79' | report | Ross Caldwell 24' (pen.) | Stadium: Glebe Park; Attendance: 602; Referee: Euan Anderson |

| 21 February 2015 25 | Greenock Morton | 2 – 0 | Stranraer | Greenock |
| 15:00 | Declan McManus 44'; Mark Russell 90+1' | report | | Stadium: Cappielow Park; Attendance: 1,921; Referee: John McKendrick |

| 28 February 2015 26 | Peterhead | 1 – 3 | Greenock Morton | Peterhead |
| 15:00 | Andy Rodgers 56' (pen.) | report | Declan McManus 61', 87'; Ross Caldwell 90+4' | Stadium: Balmoor Stadium; Attendance: 659; Referee: Barry Cook |

| 3 March 2015 27 | Greenock Morton | 4 – 0 | Stirling Albion | Greenock |
| 19:30 | Stefan McCluskey 35', 62', 79'; Declan McManus 82' | report | | Stadium: Cappielow Park; Attendance: 1,037; Referee: Mat Northcroft |

| 7 March 2015 28 | Greenock Morton | 0 – 2 | Forfar Athletic | Greenock |
| 15:00 | | report | Iain Campbell (penalty missed); James Dale 25'; Gavin Malin 78' | Stadium: Cappielow Park; Attendance: 1,560; Referee: Craig Charleston |

| 14 March 2015 29 | Airdrieonians | 2 – 1 | Greenock Morton | Airdrie |
| 15:00 | Bryan Prunty 56'; Nathan Blockley 66' | report | Jamie McCluskey 90+1' | Stadium: Excelsior Stadium; Attendance: 1,109; Referee: Stephen Finnie |

| 21 March 2015 30 | Greenock Morton | 2 – 1 | Ayr United | Greenock |
| 15:00 | Declan McManus 90'; Ross Forbes 90+2' | report | Jon Paul McGovern 53' | Stadium: Cappielow Park; Attendance: 1,552; Referee: George Salmond |

| 28 March 2015 31 | Dunfermline Athletic | 0 – 4 | Greenock Morton | Dunfermline |
| 15:00 | | report | Stefan McCluskey 45'; Lee Kilday 50'; Declan McManus 76'; Mark Russell 90' | Stadium: East End Park; Attendance: 2,732; Referee: Kevin Clancy |

| 4 April 2015 32 | Greenock Morton | 0 – 2 | Brechin City | Greenock |
| 15:00 | | report | Bobby Barr 79' (pen.); Jamie Masson 88' | Stadium: Cappielow Park; Attendance: 1,823; Referee: Colin Steven; Man of the Match: Lee Kilday |

| 11 April 2015 33 | Greenock Morton | 3 – 2 | Stenhousemuir | Greenock |
| 15:00 | Peter MacDonald 78'; Declan McManus 87'; Stefan McCluskey 90' | report | Ross Meechan 35'; Paul McMullan 55' | Stadium: Cappielow Park; Attendance: 1,568; Referee: Barry Cook |

| 18 April 2015 34 | Stirling Albion | 0 – 2 | Greenock Morton | Stirling |
| 15:00 | | report | Jamie McCluskey 53'; Declan McManus 59' | Stadium: Forthbank Stadium; Attendance: 963; Referee: Nick Walsh |

| 25 April 2015 35 | Stranraer | 0 – 2 | Greenock Morton | Stranraer |
| 17:30 (BBC Alba) | Chris Aitken (red card) 90+4' | report | Declan McManus 40' (pen.), 44'; Ricki Lamie (red card) 77' | Stadium: Stair Park; Attendance: 1,321; Referee: Greg Aitken; Man of the Match: Declan McManus |

| 2 May 2015 36 | Greenock Morton | 3 – 1 | Peterhead | Greenock |
| 15:00 | Michael Miller 36'; Mark Russell 39'; Declan McManus 83' | report | Gary McDonald 17'; Scott Ross (red card) 21' | Stadium: Cappielow Park; Attendance: 6,024; Referee: Euan Anderson |

=== Scottish Cup ===
| 1 November 2014 3rd Round | Greenock Morton | 0 – 0 | Airdrieonians | Greenock |
| 15.00 | Joe McKee (red card) 64' | report | | Stadium: Cappielow Park; Attendance: 1,420; Referee: George Salmond |

| 11 November 2014 3rd Round Replay | Airdrieonians | 0 – 2 | Greenock Morton | Airdrie |
| 19.45 | | report | Andrew Barrowman 36', 77' | Stadium: Excelsior Stadium; Attendance: 668; Referee: George Salmond |

| 29 November 2014 4th Round | Spartans | 2 – 1 | Greenock Morton | Edinburgh |
| 15.00 | Willie Bremner 71'; Jack Beesley 90' | report | Andrew Barrowman 25'; Stefan McCluskey (yellow card) 82' (red card) | Stadium: Ainslie Park; Attendance: 1,288; Referee: Euan Anderson |

=== Scottish League Cup ===
| 2 August 2014 1st Round | Greenock Morton | 2 – 1 | (England) Berwick Rangers | Greenock |
| 19:30 | Joe McKee 27', 64' | report | Lee Currie 63' (pen.); Paul Currie (red card) 87' | Stadium: Cappielow Park; Attendance: 931; Referee: Calum Murray |

| 26 August 2014 2nd Round | Greenock Morton | 0 – 1 | Partick Thistle | Greenock |
| 19:30 | | report | Kris Doolan 45+1' | Stadium: Cappielow Park; Attendance: 2,005; Referee: Stephen Finnie |

=== Scottish Challenge Cup ===
| 26 July 2014 1st Round South | Greenock Morton | 1 – 0 | Spartans | Greenock |
| 15:00 | Cameron O'Neil 27' | report | | Stadium: Cappielow Park; Attendance: 928; Referee: Calum Murray |

| 19 August 2014 2nd Round South | Greenock Morton | 5 – 2 | (England) Berwick Rangers | Greenock |
| 19:30 | Jamie McCluskey 14'; Thomas O'Ware 45'; Declan McManus 105', 114', 117'; Jamie McCluskey (yellow card) 119' (red card) | report | Scott Maxwell 9'; Lee Currie 90+3' | Stadium: Cappielow Park; Attendance: 906; Referee: Barry Cook |

| 6 September 2014 Quarter-final | Greenock Morton | 0 – 1 | Alloa Athletic | Greenock |
| 15:00 | | report | Ryan McCord 89' | Stadium: Cappielow Park; Attendance: 1,273; Referee: Des Roache |

=== Development squad ===
==== Friendlies ====
| 21 July 2014 Friendly | St Mirren | 1 – 3 | Greenock Morton | Ralston |
| | Goal | report | Hermann Kabasele; Jon Scullion (pen.) | Stadium: St Mirren training complex Attendance: Closed door |

| 30 July 2014 Friendly | Neilston Juniors | 3 – 3 | Greenock Morton | Neilston |
| | Bryan Smith; Derek Kennedy; Thomas McGaughey | | Aidan Ferris; Jon Scullion (pen.); Jordan Cairnie | Stadium: Brig O' Lea Stadium |

==== Development League West ====
| 2 September 2014 1 | Clyde | 0 – 3 | Greenock Morton | Croy |
| 19.15 | | report | Jon Scullion | Stadium: Broadwood Stadium (outdoor pitch); Referee: David Dickinson |

| 8 September 2014 2 | Dumbarton | 1 – 4 | Greenock Morton | Milngavie |
| 20.00 | Andrew Biddulph 69' | report | Jon Scullion 19', 70', 82'; David McNeil 78' | Stadium: Rangers Training Centre; Referee: Stephen Brown |

| 15 September 2014 3 | Queen's Park | 2 – 2 | Greenock Morton | Glasgow |
| 19.30 | Thomas Collins (pen.) (pen.) | report | Jon Scullion (pen.); David McNeil | Stadium: Toryglen Regional Football Centre (outdoor pitch); Referee: Chris Graham |

| 23 September 2014 4 | Greenock Morton | 1 – 1 | Queen of the South | Port Glasgow |
| 14.00 | Stefan McCluskey | report | Aidan Smith | Stadium: Port Glasgow Community Stadium; Referee: Alan Macfadyen |

| 30 September 2014 5 | Airdrieonians | 0 – 1 | Greenock Morton | Airdrie |
| 20.00 | | report | Jack Kirwan 19' (o.g.) | Stadium: Shyberry Excelsior Stadium; Referee: Steven Reid |

| 7 October 2014 6 | Greenock Morton | 3 – 1 | Annan Athletic | Greenock |
| 19.30 | Reece Hands; Cameron O'Neil; Luke Irvine (yellow card) (red card) | report | Peter Weatherson | Stadium: Cappielow Park; Referee: Steven Kirkland |

| 14 October 2014 7 | Ayr United | 3 – 1 | Greenock Morton | Ayr |
| 19.45 | Goal | report | David McNeil 1' | Stadium: Somerset Park; Referee: Calum Haswell |

| 21 October 2014 | Greenock Morton | P – P | Clyde | Greenock |
| | | | | Stadium: Cappielow Park |

| 27 October 2014 8 | Dumbarton | 0 – 3 | Greenock Morton | Milngavie |
| 20.00 | | | Thomas Orr; David McNeil; Alex McWaters | Stadium: Rangers Training Centre; Referee: Craig Napier |

| 4 November 2014 9 | Greenock Morton | 0 – 1 | Queen's Park | Greenock |
| 19.30 | | report | Gavin Mitchell | Stadium: Cappielow Park; Referee: Steven Kirkland |

| 13 November 2014 10 | Queen of the South | 1 – 0 | Greenock Morton | Dumfries |
| 19.30 | Dean Smith | report | | Stadium: Palmerston Park; Referee: Calum Haswell |

| 17 November 2014 11 | Greenock Morton | 3 – 4 | Airdrieonians | Greenock |
| 19.30 | Mark Russell; Stefan McCluskey; Thomas Orr (pen.) | report | Jamie Watson; Macaulay Wilson (red card) | Stadium: Cappielow Park; Referee: William Wilson |

| 25 November 2014 12 | Annan Athletic | 2 – 4 | Greenock Morton | Annan |
| 19.30 | Scott Davidson; Rabine Omar | report | Craig Murray (o.g.); Thomas Orr (pen.); David McNeil | Stadium: Galabank; Referee: Brian Templeton |

| 1 December 2014 13 | Greenock Morton | 0 – 4 | Ayr United | Greenock |
| 19.30 | Jamie McGowan (red card) 44' | report | Ryan Nesbit 39' (pen.) 70', 80'; Mick Wardrope 60' | Stadium: Cappielow Park; Referee: Duncan Williams |

| 16 December 2014 14 | Greenock Morton | 3 – 1 | Dumbarton | Greenock |
| 19.00 | Thomas Orr; Jordan Allan | | Steven McDougall | Stadium: Cappielow Park; Referee: David Lowe |

| 6 January 2015 | Greenock Morton | P – P | Clyde | Greenock |
| | | | | Stadium: Cappielow Park |

| 19 January 2015 | Queen's Park | P – P | Greenock Morton | Glasgow |
| | | | | Stadium: Lesser Hampden |

| 27 January 2015 15 | Greenock Morton | 2 – 0 | Queen of the South | Port Glasgow |
| 14.30 | Sean Crighton 42'; Scott Tiffoney 50'; Stefan Milojević (red card) 60' | report | | Stadium: Port Glasgow Community Stadium; Referee: Calum Haswell |

| 2 February 2015 16 | Airdrieonians | 1 – 0 | Greenock Morton | Airdrie |
| 20.00 | Macaulay Wilson | report | | Stadium: Shyberry Excelsior Stadium; Referee: Duncan Williams |

| 10 February 2015 17 | Greenock Morton | 4 – 2 | Annan Athletic | Greenock |
| 19.30 | Aidan Ferris; Thomas Orr | report | Craig Knight (o.g.); Junior Ogan | Stadium: Cappielow Park; Referee: Steven Kirkland |

| 17 February 2015 18 | Ayr United | 0 – 1 | Greenock Morton | Ayr |
| 20.00 | | report | Thomas Orr | Stadium: Somerset Park; Referee: David Dickinson |

| 24 February 2015 19 | Clyde | 1 – 3 | Greenock Morton | Croy |
| 19.15 | Liam McGuigan 61' | report | Jon Scullion 4', 6'; Jordan Cairnie 58'; Lewis Stevenson (yellow card) 60' (red card) | Stadium: Broadwood Stadium (outdoor pitch); Referee: Chris Graham |

| 10 March 2015 20 | Greenock Morton | 2 – 1 | Queen's Park | Glasgow |
| 20.00 | Thomas Orr; Joe McKee | report | Billy Mortimer | Stadium: Lesser Hampden (officially Morton's home game); Referee: David Munro |

| 12 March 2015 | Greenock Morton | P – P | Clyde | Greenock |
| | | | | Stadium: Cappielow Park |

| 16 March 2015 21 | Queen of the South | 2 – 1 | Greenock Morton | Dumfries |
| 19.30 | Goal | report | Jordan Cairnie | Stadium: Palmerston Park; Referee: Derek Crothers |

| 24 March 2015 22 | Greenock Morton | 0 – 3 | Airdrieonians | Airdrie |
| 20.00 | | report | Scott Gray; Kyle Richford | Stadium: Shyberry Excelsior Stadium (officially Morton's home game); Referee: Grant Irvine |

| 21 October 2014 23 | Greenock Morton | 3 – 0 | Clyde | Greenock |
| 19.30 | John Mitchell; Jon Scullion; Scott Miller | report | | Stadium: Cappielow Park |

| 31 March 2015 24 | Annan Athletic | 0 – 2 | Greenock Morton | Annan |
| 19.30 | | | Aidan Ferris; Michael Tidser | Stadium: Galabank; Referee: Matthew MacDermid |

| 2 April 2015 25 | Greenock Morton | 0 – 2 | Dumbarton | Lennoxtown |
| 19.45 | | | Ryan Clark; Donald McCallum | Stadium: Lennoxtown training centre (officially Morton's home game); Referee: Duncan Williams |

| 6 April 2015 26 | Greenock Morton | 1 – 3 | Ayr United | Greenock |
| 19.30 | Thomas Orr; Ross Caldwell (penalty missed) | 19.30 | Ryan Nesbit; Sean McKenzie | Stadium: Cappielow Park; Referee: Steven Kirkland |

| 8 April 2015 27 | Greenock Morton | 3 – 0 | Clyde | Greenock |
| 19.30 | Thomas Orr (pen.) | | | Stadium: Cappielow Park; Referee: David Dickinson |

| 13 April 2015 28 | Queen's Park | 1 – 2 | Greenock Morton | Glasgow |
| 20.00 | Thomas Loan | | Dylan Stevenson; Jordan Cairnie | Stadium: Lesser Hampden; Referee: David Munro |

==== Scottish Youth Cup ====
| 2 November 2014 3rd Round | Raith Rovers | 0 – 5 | Greenock Morton | Kirkcaldy |
| | | report | Jordan Allan; David McNeil; Thomas Orr | Stadium: Stark's Park; Referee: Chris McNab |

| 7 December 2014 4th Round | Greenock Morton | 4 – 4 (3 – 4 on penalties) | Queen's Park | Greenock |
| 12.00 | Jon Scullion; Dale Jones (o.g.); Thomas Orr (pen.); Cameron O'Neil; Jordan Allan (yellow card) (red card) | report | William Mortimer; Samuel Biggart | Stadium: Cappielow Park; Referee: Kevin McElhinney |

== League table ==
| Pos | Team | Pld | W | D | L | GF | GA | GD | Pts | Promotion or relegation |
|---|---|---|---|---|---|---|---|---|---|---|
| 1 | Greenock Morton (C, P) | 36 | 22 | 3 | 11 | 65 | 40 | +25 | 69 | Promotion to the Championship |
| 2 | Stranraer | 36 | 20 | 7 | 9 | 59 | 38 | +21 | 67 | Qualification for the Championship play-offs |
| 3 | Forfar Athletic | 36 | 20 | 6 | 10 | 59 | 43 | +16 | 66 | Qualification for the Championship play-offs |
| 4 | Brechin City | 36 | 15 | 14 | 7 | 58 | 46 | +12 | 59 | Qualification for the Championship play-offs |
| 5 | Airdrieonians | 36 | 16 | 10 | 10 | 53 | 39 | +14 | 58 | |

Source: SPFL
Rules for classification: 1) points; 2) goal difference; 3) number of goals scored.
(C) Champions; (P) Promoted

== Player statistics ==
As of 4 May 2015

=== All competitions ===
- Additional positions played listed, if have started in more than one this season.

| Position | Player | Starts | Subs | Unused subs | Goals | Red cards (red card) | Yellow cards (yellow card) |
|---|---|---|---|---|---|---|---|
| GK | (Scotland) Grant Adam | 4 | 0 | 11 | 0 | 0 | 0 |
| MF | (Scotland) Jordan Allan | 1 | 7 | 15 | 0 | 1 | 0 |
| FW | (Scotland) Andrew Barrowman | 19 | 0 | 0 | 6 | 0 | 3 |
| FW | (Scotland) Jordan Cairnie | 0 | 1 | 5 | 0 | 0 | 0 |
| FW | (Scotland) Ross Caldwell | 10 | 7 | 0 | 4 | 0 | 3 |
| GK | (France) Nicolas Caraux | 5 | 0 | 17 | 0 | 0 | 0 |
| MF | (Scotland) Robbie Crawford (on loan from Rangers) | 10 | 2 | 4 | 1 | 0 | 2 |
| DF | (Scotland) Sean Crighton | 36 | 1 | 3 | 0 | 1 | 4 |
| FW | (Scotland) Aidan Ferris | 0 | 3 | 6 | 0 | 0 | 0 |
| MF | (Scotland) Ross Forbes | 15 | 1 | 0 | 1 | 0 | 3 |
| GK | (Scotland) Derek Gaston | 34 | 0 | 7 | 0 | 0 | 0 |
| MF | (England) Reece Hands | 5 | 7 | 5 | 1 | 0 | 0 |
| DF | (Scotland) Luke Irvine | 0 | 0 | 1 | 0 | 0 | 0 |
| DF | (Scotland) Lee Kilday | 43 | 1 | 0 | 3 | 0 | 4 |
| DF | (Scotland) Craig Knight | 0 | 0 | 8 | 0 | 0 | 0 |
| DF | (Scotland) Ricki Lamie | 33 | 4 | 5 | 0 | 1 | 7 |
| FW | (Scotland) Peter MacDonald | 10 | 5 | 0 | 4 | 0 | 2 |
| MF | (Scotland) Jamie McCluskey | 25 | 7 | 4 | 6 | 1 | 4 |
| FW | (Scotland) Stefan McCluskey | 21 | 9 | 5 | 7 | 1 | 6 |
| GK | (Scotland) Jamie McGowan | 1 | 1 | 8 | 0 | 0 | 0 |
| MF | (Scotland) Joe McKee | 26 | 5 | 5 | 4 | 1 | 5 |
| FW | (Scotland) Declan McManus (on loan from Aberdeen) | 34 | 0 | 0 | 23 | 0 | 8 |
| FW | (Scotland) David McNeil | 2 | 7 | 15 | 1 | 0 | 0 |
| DF / MF | (Scotland) Michael Miller | 23 | 6 | 6 | 1 | 0 | 4 |
| DF | (Serbia) Stefan Milojević | 27 | 2 | 6 | 1 | 0 | 5 |
| MF | (Scotland) Cameron O'Neil | 1 | 1 | 2 | 1 | 0 | 0 |
| FW | (Scotland) Thomas Orr | 0 | 3 | 4 | 0 | 0 | 0 |
| DF / MF / FW | (Scotland) Thomas O'Ware | 38 | 4 | 0 | 5 | 0 | 5 |
| MF | (Republic of Ireland) Conor Pepper | 27 | 4 | 4 | 2 | 1 | 9 |
| DF / MF | (Scotland) Mark Russell | 30 | 5 | 8 | 3 | 0 | 5 |
| MF / FW | (Scotland) Jon Scullion | 4 | 7 | 24 | 1 | 0 | 1 |
| MF | (Scotland) Dylan Stevenson | 0 | 1 | 0 | 0 | 0 | 0 |
| DF | (Scotland) John Tennent | 0 | 0 | 1 | 0 | 0 | 0 |

=== Development squad goalscorers ===
Including goals from the Development League West and SFA Youth Cup

- Thomas Orr - 15
- Jon Scullion - 11
- David McNeil - 7
- Jordan Allan, Jordan Cairnie & Aidan Ferris - 3
- Cameron O'Neil, Stefan McCluskey & Reece Hands - 2
- Joe McKee, Sean Crighton, Dylan Stevenson, Scott Tiffoney, Mark Russell, Scott Miller, Michael Tidser, John Mitchell & Alex McWaters - 1

=== Awards ===
Last updated 25 April 2014

| Nation | Name | Award | Month |
|---|---|---|---|
| (Scotland) | Jim Duffy | League One Manager of the Month | November 2014 |
| (Scotland) | Declan McManus | PFA Scotland League One Team of the Year | May 2015 |
| (Scotland) | Mark Russell | PFA Scotland League One Team of the Year | May 2015 |
| (Scotland) | Declan McManus | SPFA League One Player of the Year | May 2015 |
