= Jon Scullion =

Scottish footballer

Personal information
- Date of birth: 16 March 1995 (age 31)
- Place of birth: Glasgow, Scotland
- Position: Striker

Team information
- Current team: Kilbirnie Ladeside

Youth career
- 2012–2014: St Mirren

Senior career*
Years	Team	Apps	(Gls)
2014–2017	Greenock Morton	26	(2)
2017–	Kilbirnie Ladeside	?	(?)
2020-2021	→ Yoker Athletic (loan)	?	(?)
- * Club domestic league appearances and goals as of 17 June 2022

Jon Scullion (born 16 March 1995) is a Scottish professional footballer who plays as a striker for Kilbirnie Ladeside, having previously played for Greenock Morton in the Scottish Championship.

== Career ==
Scullion started his career with Paisley side St Mirren before joining their local rivals Greenock Morton in 2014. He made his debut away at Stenhousemuir in September 2014.

He signed an extension to his original deal in May 2015 which contracted him to the club until January 2016. In December 2015, Scullion was offered an extension until the end of the season.

In May 2016, Scullion received another six-month deal with the club. This was extended further towards the end of December to take him to the end of the season. At the end of his deal, Scullion's contract was not renewed and he left the club in May 2017.

After failing to win a contract at Lowland Football League side East Kilbride, Scullion joined Ayrshire Junior side Kilbirnie Ladeside in August 2017.

In season 2020–21, Scullion had a loan spell at Yoker Athletic.

== Career statistics ==
As of match played 6 May 2017

Appearances and goals by club, season and competition
Club	Season	League			Scottish Cup		League Cup		Other		Total	
Club	Season	Division	Apps	Goals	Apps	Goals	Apps	Goals	Apps	Goals	Apps	Goals
Greenock Morton	2014–15	League One	9	1	1	0	0	0	0	0	10	1
Greenock Morton	2015–16	Championship	8	1	0	0	2	2	1 (Note: Appearances in the Scottish Challenge Cup)	0	11	3
Greenock Morton	2016–17	Championship	9	0	0	0	3	0	1	0	13	0
Greenock Morton	Greenock Morton total		26	2	1	0	5	2	2	0	34	4
Kilbirnie Ladeside	2017–18	West of Scotland Super League; Premier Division										
Career total			26	2	1	0	5	2	2	0	34	4

== Honours ==
Morton

- Scottish League One: Winners 2014–15
- SPFL Development League West: Winners 2015–16
