= David McNeil (footballer) =

Scottish footballer

Personal information
- Full name: David John McNeil
- Date of birth: 21 January 1995 (age 31)
- Place of birth: Greenock, Scotland
- Height: 6 ft 0 in (1.83 m)
- Position: Forward

Team information
- Current team: Port Glasgow Juniors

Youth career
- 2007–2013: Kilmarnock

Senior career*
Years	Team	Apps	(Gls)
2013–2015	Greenock Morton	15	(1)
2015–2016	Greenock Juniors	12	(4)
2016–2017	Ardrossan Winton Rovers	26	(9)
2018–	Port Glasgow Juniors	18	(5)
- * Club domestic league appearances and goals as of 11.57, 30 December 2018 (UTC)

David John McNeil (born 21 January 1995) is a Scottish footballer. He currently plays junior football for Port Glasgow Juniors having last played professionally for Greenock Morton in Scottish League One.

== Career ==
He started his career at Kilmarnock aged 12, after coming through the First Touch scheme.

McNeil made his senior debut for Greenock Morton at the age of 18, scoring the third as a substitute against East Fife on 3 August 2013.

McNeil signed a new 6-month deal in July 2014.

He scored his first league goal for the club in a 2–0 win over Stirling Albion in October 2014.

McNeil was released at the end of his short-term contract in January 2015. Since leaving Morton, McNeil has had trials with Livingston, Queens Park, Stenhousemuir and Clyde.

For the start of the 2015/16 season, he was invited for a second trial at Queens Park, to take part in there pre-season training. It was after this trial spell that McNeil signed for Greenock Juniors. In 2016, McNeil joined up with his ex-Morton colleagues Luke Irvine, Jordan Cairnie and Sandy MacLean at Ardrossan Winton Rovers.

McNeil joined Port Glasgow Juniors for the 2018/19 season.

== Personal life ==
David is the son of Morton player John McNeil. He attended St. Columba's High School in Gourock and grew up as a Morton supporter.

== See also ==
- Greenock Morton F.C. season 2013–14 | 2014–15
