= Jamie McCluskey =

Scottish footballer

Personal information
- Full name: James McCluskey
- Date of birth: 6 November 1987 (age 38)
- Place of birth: Bellshill, Scotland
- Position: Winger

Senior career*
Years	Team	Apps	(Gls)
2003–2007	Hibernian	19	(0)
2007–2008	St Johnstone	5	(0)
2009–2010	Wrexham	21	(0)
2010–2011	St Mirren	3	(0)
2011	→ Clyde (loan)	9	(1)
2011–2013	Dundee	28	(3)
2013–2014	Forfar Athletic	14	(2)
2014–2015	Greenock Morton	27	(5)
2015–2016	Stranraer	4	(0)
- * Club domestic league appearances and goals

James McCluskey (born 6 November 1987) is a Scottish former footballer.

McCluskey, who started his career with Hibernian, set a record for the youngest player to play in the Scottish Premier League when he made his senior debut. He has also played for St Johnstone, Wrexham, St Mirren, Clyde, Dundee, Forfar Athletic, Greenock Morton and Stranraer.

== Career ==
McCluskey graduated from the Hibernian youth team and made fourteen first team appearances in the 2004–05 season. When McCluskey made his debut, he became the youngest-ever player to play in the Scottish Premier League. This record was broken by Scott Robinson of Hearts in April 2008.

McCluskey was released by Hibs, however, in the summer of 2007, having had "a difference of opinion" with manager John Collins. Another reason for being released was a lack of first team opportunities

He was then signed by First Division club St Johnstone. McCluskey suffered terrible injury problems with St Johnstone, breaking the same foot twice. In March 2008, having required surgery, McCluskey was ruled out for the rest of the season. He only made five league appearances before being released at the end of the 2007–08 season.

After his release by St Johnstone, McCluskey had a trial period with Serbian club Partizan Belgrade, but he failed to win a contract. He then went on trial with Serie A club Catania, but eventually signed for Wrexham until the end of the 2008–09 season. After signing a new deal, he remained with the club for the 2009–10 season, before being released at the end of the season.

In July 2010, McCluskey went on trial at Greenock Morton, playing in trial games against Hamilton Accies, Albion Rovers and a Nigerian touring XI. In the friendly match against the Nigerian side, he scored a penalty in a 4–2 Morton victory. After the trial, manager Allan Moore announced he had ended his interest signing McCluskey.

After failing to win a contract at Morton, McCluskey signed a one-year contract with St Mirren on 24 September 2010. Having struggled to get in the first team at St Mirren, he, along with four youngsters, was linked with a temporary move to Irish side Galway United, but nothing came of it.

In March 2011, McCluskey joined Clyde on loan until the end of the season. He made his debut for the club in a 1–1 draw against Arbroath on 22 March 2011. Seven days later, on 29 March 2011, McCluskey scored his first goal for the club, in a 2–0 win over Annan Athletic. At the end of the season, he had made nine appearances, scoring once before returning to St Mirren, who then released him.

Ahead of the new season, Dundee signed McCluskey on a one-year deal in July 2011. He made his debut for the club in the opening game of the season, a 1–0 win over Partick Thistle. After eight months at the club, McCluskey scored twice against Livingston in a 3–2 win and scored again in the next match, a 4–1 win over Ayr United, also providing an assist for Ryan Conroy. At the end of the season, he had made 27 appearances, scoring three times.

The club would finish in second place but were promoted to the Scottish Premier League to replace Rangers, who had been placed in the Third Division. However, that season, McCluskey failed to make a first team appearance, suffering an Achilles tendon injury. At the end of the season McCluskey was amongst the players released by Dundee after their relegation.

On 12 October 2013, McCluskey played as a trialist for Forfar Athletic in their Scottish League One match against Stranraer. After making three appearances as a trialist, McCluskey signed a short-term contract with Forfar.

On 30 July 2014, McCluskey signed for Greenock Morton on a one-month contract. This was extended until the end of the season, on 22 August 2014. McCluskey was released at the end of the season and signed for Scottish League One side Stranraer in October 2015.

== Personal life ==
Jamie's younger brother Stefan McCluskey is also a footballer and they once played together for Greenock Morton.

== Career statistics ==
As of 26 December 2015

Club	Season	League		National Cup		League Cup		Other		Total	
Club	Season	App	Goals	App	Goals	App	Goals	App	Goals	App	Goals
Hibernian	2003–04	1	0	0	0	0	0	0	0	1	0
Hibernian	2004–05	10	0	2	0	1	0	0	0	13	0
Hibernian	2005–06	3	0	3	0	0	0	0	0	6	0
Hibernian	2006–07	5	0	0	0	2	1	1	0	8	1
Hibernian	Total	19	0	5	0	3	1	1	0	28	1
St Johnstone	2007–08	5	0	0	0	1	0	2	0	8	0
Wrexham	2008–09	8	0	0	0	0	0	0	0	8	0
Wrexham	2009–10	13	0	2	0	0	0	0	0	15	0
Wrexham	Total	21	0	2	0	0	0	0	0	23	0
St Mirren	2010–11	3	0	0	0	0	0	0	0	3	0
Clyde (loan)	2010–11	9	1	0	0	0	0	0	0	9	1
Dundee	2011–12	28	3	3	0	1	1	2	0	34	4
Dundee	2012–13	0	0	0	0	0	0	0	0	0	0
Dundee	Total	28	3	3	0	1	1	2	0	34	4
Forfar Athletic	2013–14	14	2	2	0	0	0	0	0	16	2
Greenock Morton	2014–15	27	5	3	0	1	0	1	1	32	6
Stranraer	2015–16	4	0	0	0	0	0	0	0	4	0
Career Total		130	11	15	0	6	0	6	1	157	12

== Honours ==
Morton

- Scottish League One: Winners 2014–15

St Johnstone

- Scottish Challenge Cup: Winners 2007–08

Hibernian

- Scottish League Cup: Winners 2006–07

== See also ==
- Greenock Morton F.C. season 2014–15
