= Derek Gaston =

Scottish footballer

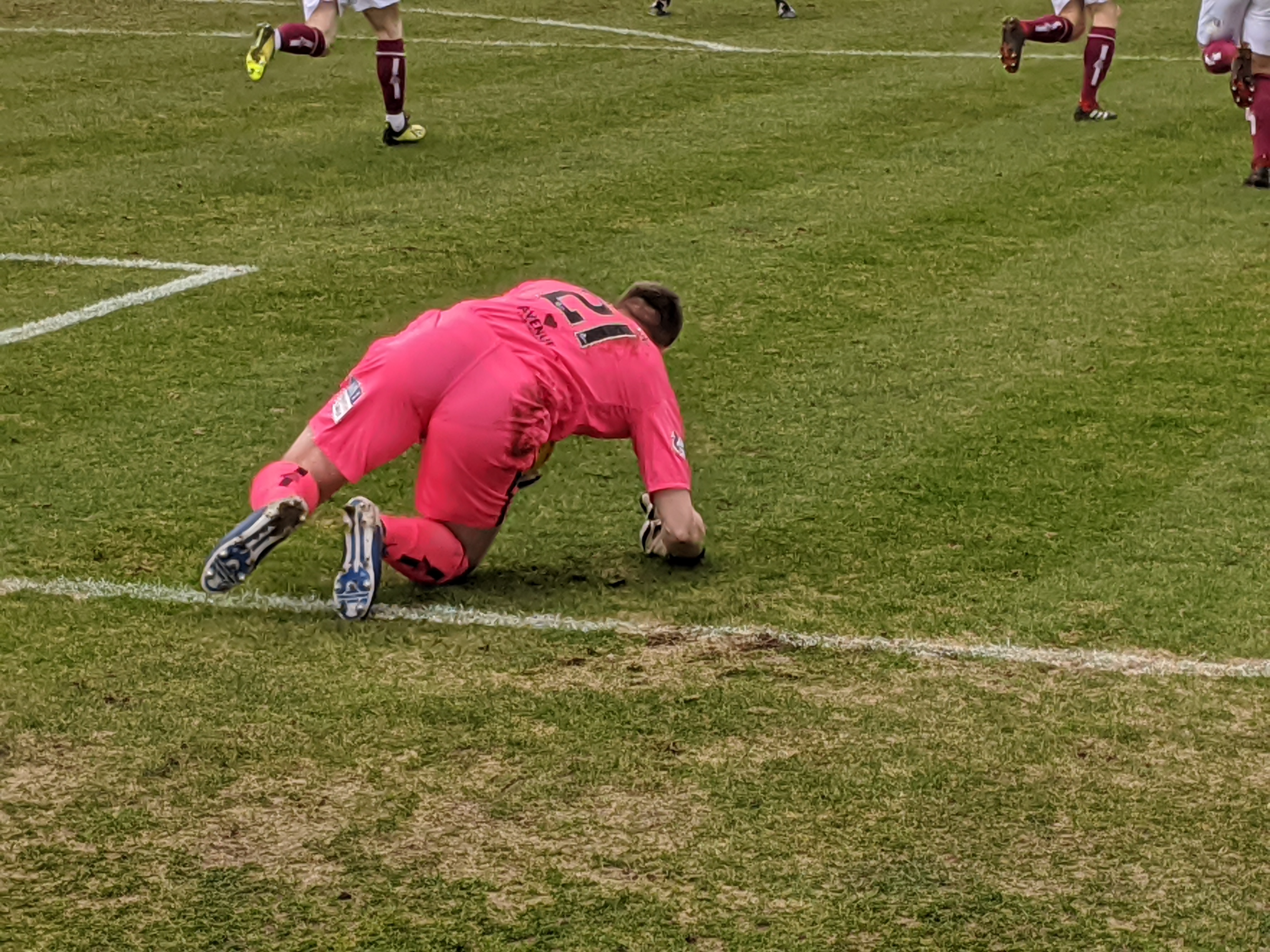
- Gaston playing for Arbroath in 2020.

Personal information
- Full name: Derek John Gaston
- Date of birth: 18 April 1987 (age 39)
- Place of birth: Glasgow, Scotland
- Height: 6 ft 3 in (1.91 m)
- Position: Goalkeeper

Team information
- Current team: East Fife
- Number: 1

Youth career
- Ballieston U21

Senior career*
Years	Team	Apps	(Gls)
2009–2012	Albion Rovers	78	(0)
2012–2019	Greenock Morton	180	(0)
2019–2024	Arbroath	137	(0)
2024–2026	Stirling Albion	67	(0)
2026–	East Fife	4	(0)
- * Club domestic league appearances and goals as of 27 August 2026

Derek Gaston (born 18 April 1987) is a Scottish professional footballer who plays as a goalkeeper for East Fife. Gaston previously played for Albion Rovers before lengthy stints with Greenock Morton and Arbroath. He then spent two seasons with Stirling Albion.

== Career ==
Gaston began his senior career with Albion Rovers in 2009, signing from local youth side Baillieston under-21s. He won the Scottish Football League player of the month award for September 2009.

He joined Greenock Morton in 2012, making his debut against his former club in the Challenge Cup in July 2012. After playing all but three matches for Morton in his first season, Gaston signed a new one-year contract in May 2013.

In May 2014, he agreed to sign for a further season, followed by signing another one-year deal in May 2015 after winning Scottish League One. Another contract renewal followed in October 2015, to tie him to Morton until 2018.

Gaston signed on for a seventh season at Cappielow in June 2018. He was released by Morton in the summer of 2019, having made over 200 appearances for the club.

On 4 June 2019, Gaston signed for newly promoted Scottish Championship club Arbroath. In his third season, Gaston earned 10 clean sheets in the opening 20 league games.

== Career statistics ==
As of 5 May 2023

Appearances and goals by club, season and competition
Club	Season	League			Scottish Cup		League Cup		Other		Total	
Club	Season	Division	Apps	Goals	Apps	Goals	Apps	Goals	Apps	Goals	Apps	Goals
Albion Rovers	2009–10	Scottish Third Division	21	0	3	0	2	0	1 (Note: Appearances in the Scottish Challenge Cup)	0	27	0
Albion Rovers	2010–11	Scottish Third Division	26	0	1	0	1	0	5 (Note: One appearance in the Scottish Challenge Cup and four appearances in the Second Division play-offs)	0	33	0
Albion Rovers	2011–12	Scottish Second Division	31	0	1	0	0	0	5	0	37	0
Albion Rovers	Total		78	0	5	0	3	0	11	0	97	0
Greenock Morton	2012–13	Scottish First Division	33	0	5	0	2	0	2	0	42	0
Greenock Morton	2013–14	Scottish Championship	18	0	0	0	1	0	0	0	19	0
Greenock Morton	2014–15	Scottish League One	31	0	2	0	0	0	1	0	34	0
Greenock Morton	2015–16	Scottish Championship	26	0	3	0	3	0	1	0	33	0
Greenock Morton	2016–17	Scottish Championship	30	0	3	0	2	0	1 (Note: Appearance in the Premiership play-offs)	0	36	0
Greenock Morton	2017–18	Scottish Championship	32	0	3	0	4	0	1	0	40	0
Greenock Morton	2018–19	Scottish Championship	10	0	3	0	1	0	1	0	15	0
Greenock Morton	Total		180	0	19	0	13	0	7	0	219	0
Arbroath	2019–20	Scottish Championship	19	0	3	0	2	0	2	0	26	0
Arbroath	2020–21	Scottish Championship	27	0	1	0	5	0	0	0	33	0
Arbroath	2021–22	Scottish Championship	33	0	3	0	3	0	2 (Note: Appearances in the Premiership play-offs)	0	41	0
Arbroath	2022–23	Scottish Championship	35	0	1	0	4	0	0	0	40	0
Arbroath	Total		114	0	8	0	14	0	4	0	140	0
Career total			372	0	32	0	30	0	22	0	456	0

== Honours ==
Morton

- Scottish League One: Winners 2014–15

Individual

- GMFC Player of the Year: 2014–15
- SPFL Team of the Year: 2014–15
- Scottish Football League Player of the Month: September 2009

== See also ==
- Greenock Morton F.C. season 2012–13 | 2013–14 | 2014–15 | 2015–16
