= Mark Russell (footballer, born 1996) =

Scottish footballer

Personal information
- Date of birth: 22 March 1996 (age 30)
- Place of birth: Paisley, Scotland
- Height: 1.78 m (5 ft 10 in)
- Position: Left midfielder

Team information
- Current team: Stirling Albion
- Number: 10

Youth career
- Gleniffer B.C.
- St. Mirren B.C.

Senior career*
Years	Team	Apps	(Gls)
2013–2018	Greenock Morton	126	(4)
2018–2019	Falkirk	3	(0)
2019–2021	Finn Harps	57	(3)
2021–2022	Greenock Morton	26	(0)
2022	Galway United	1	(0)
2022–2024	Portadown	71	(3)
2024–2026	Stranraer	48	(16)
2026–	Stirling Albion	14	(2)
- * Club domestic league appearances and goals as of 5 May 2026

Mark Russell (born 22 March 1996) is a Scottish professional footballer who plays as a left midfielder for Stirling Albion. He also regularly plays at left back/left wing back.

He began his career with Greenock Morton and made over 100 appearances for them, spending a short spell with Falkirk before spending two years playing in Ireland for Finn Harps.

== Early life ==
Born in Paisley, Russell attended Gleniffer High School.

== Club career ==
Russell moved into the professional game when he signed a full-time contract with Greenock Morton in the Scottish Championship as part of their new development squad.

He made his début for the club as an injury time substitute for Dougie Imrie in November 2013.

In June 2014, Russell signed a new two-year development squad contract with Morton.

Russell was included in the PFA Scotland League One Team of the Year for 2014-15 along with teammate Declan McManus.

In Autumn 2015, Russell rejected a new contract offer from Morton. A second offer was made, which Russell accepted in December 2015.

In June 2017, Russell signed up for a further season with the club.

=== Falkirk ===
He left Morton in June 2018 in search of a new challenge, signing a six-month contract with rival Championship club Falkirk. After making just four appearances for Falkirk, he was released by the club in January 2019.

=== Finn Harps ===
Shortly after leaving Falkirk, Russell trialled with League of Ireland Premier Division side Finn Harps, earning himself a one-year deal at the Irish club. He featured in 29 games for the club, scoring one goal in the relegation play-offs, as Harps retained their place in the Premier Division.

Following speculation around his future, he signed a new one-year extension for the 2020 season in January 2020.

2020 saw Russell having a successful season with Finn Harps. In the shortened 18 game season, due to the COVID-19 pandemic, Russell scored three times as the Donegal side recorded their highest league finish in twenty years, with Russell playing a number of games as a support striker. In turn, he finished as the club's top league goalscorer. The season ended in disappointment, however, as Harps were controversially beaten by Shamrock Rovers in the FAI Cup quarter final.

Russell signed on for a further year at Harps in January 2021, marking his third season in succession with the club.

=== Return to Greenock Morton ===
On 22 June 2021, Russell returned to Greenock Morton after a three-year spell away from the club.

=== Galway United ===
On 2 July 2022, he signed for League of Ireland First Division side Galway United until the end of the season. He made his debut on 8 July, coming off the bench for the last 5 minutes of a 3–0 win over Cobh Ramblers in what proved to be his only appearance for the club.

=== Portadown ===
Just one month later, on 4 August 2022 Russell moved club again, this time signing for NIFL Premiership club Portadown. After 2 seasons at the club, Russell would depart, seeking a return to Scotland.

=== Stranraer ===
On 29 June 2024, Russell signed with Stranraer in Scottish League Two.

== Career statistics ==
As of match played 8 July 2022

Appearances and goals by club, season and competition
Club	Season	League			National Cup		League Cup		Other		Total	
Club	Season	Division	Apps	Goals	Apps	Goals	Apps	Goals	Apps	Goals	Apps	Goals
Greenock Morton	2013–14	Scottish Championship	12	0	1	0	0	0	0	0	13	0
Greenock Morton	2014–15	Scottish League One	25	3	2	0	0	0	0	0	27	3
Greenock Morton	2015–16	Scottish Championship	30	0	4	0	2	0	1 (Note: Appearance in the Scottish Challenge Cup)	0	37	0
Greenock Morton	2016–17	Scottish Championship	30	1	3	0	5	0	2 (Note: Appearances in the Premiership play-offs)	0	40	1
Greenock Morton	2017–18	Scottish Championship	29	0	3	0	4	0	0	0	36	0
Greenock Morton	Total		116	4	13	0	11	0	3	0	143	4
Falkirk	2018–19	Scottish Championship	3	0	0	0	0	0	1	0	4	0
Finn Harps	2019	League of Ireland Premier Division	25	0	1	0	2	0	2 (Note: Appearance in the 2019 League of Ireland Premier Division Playoff)	1	30	1
Finn Harps	2020	League of Ireland Premier Division	17	3	3	0	—		—		20	3
Finn Harps	2021	League of Ireland Premier Division	15	0	0	0	—		—		15	0
Finn Harps	Total		57	3	4	0	2	0	2	1	65	4
Greenock Morton	2021–22	Scottish Championship	26	0	1	0	0	0	2	0	29	0
Galway United	2022	League of Ireland First Division	1	0	0	0	—		—		1	0
Portadown	2022–23	NIFL Premiership	0	0	0	0	0	0	0	0	0	0
Career total			213	7	18	0	13	0	8	1	252	8

== Honours ==
Morton

- Scottish League One: Winners 2014–15
- PFA Scotland League One Team of the Year: 2014–15

== See also ==
- Greenock Morton F.C. season 2013–14 | 2014–15 | 2015–16
