= Declan McManus =

Scottish footballer (born 1994)

Personal information
- Full name: Declan Joseph McManus
- Date of birth: 3 August 1994 (age 32)
- Place of birth: Glasgow, Scotland
- Height: 5 ft 11 in (1.80 m)
- Position: Forward

Team information
- Current team: Bangor City 1876
- Number: 9

Youth career
- –2012: Aberdeen

Senior career*
Years	Team	Apps	(Gls)
2010–2015	Aberdeen	12	(0)
2013	→ Alloa Athletic (loan)	18	(1)
2014–2015	→ Greenock Morton (loan)	19	(9)
2015	→ Greenock Morton (loan)	13	(11)
2015–2017	Fleetwood Town	7	(1)
2016	→ Greenock Morton (loan)	17	(4)
2016–2017	→ Raith Rovers (loan)	34	(5)
2017–2018	Dunfermline Athletic	32	(7)
2018–2020	Ross County	32	(2)
2019–2020	→ Falkirk (loan)	26	(19)
2020–2021	Dunfermline Athletic	27	(9)
2021–2025	The New Saints	83	(71)
2025–2026	Coleraine	24	(3)
2026–	Bangor City 1876	24	(25)

International career^{‡}
2012	Scotland U18	2	(1)
2012–2013	Scotland U19	8	(3)
2014–2015	Scotland U21	2	(0)

Managerial career
- 2026: Bangor City 1876 (interim)
- * Club domestic league appearances and goals as of 06:27, 7 November 2026 (UTC) ‡ National team caps and goals as of 22:30, 11 August 2015 (UTC)

Declan Joseph McManus (born 3 August 1994) is a Scottish professional footballer for Cymru North club Bangor City 1876. McManus has previously played for Aberdeen, Fleetwood Town, Greenock Morton, Alloa Athletic, Raith Rovers, Dunfermline Athletic, Ross County, Falkirk, The New Saints and Coleraine.

== Career ==
=== Aberdeen ===
McManus made his debut for Aberdeen's first team on 28 April 2012, coming on as a substitute in a 3–0 defeat to Dunfermline Athletic. In the new season, McManus goalscoring form in the U20 league caught the eye of Dundee and Partick Thistle, who were keen to sign him on loan. In November 2012, McManus signed a new contract with the club that will keep him until 2015.

On 31 July 2013 McManus joined Alloa Athletic on a six-month loan deal. McManus made his first ever senior start in Alloa Athletic's 2–0 win in the League Cup First Round fixture against Peterhead. On 14 December 2013, McManus scored his first senior goal in Alloa's 2–0 win against Greenock Morton.

McManus moved on loan to Scottish League One club Greenock Morton on 8 August 2014. He scored his first ever senior hat-trick in a 5–2 cup victory over Berwick Rangers in August 2014, and left the club at the end of his loan spell having scored 12 goals in 21 starts. On 2 February 2015, McManus joined Greenock Morton for a second loan spell, signing until the end of the 2014–15 season. McManus was nominated for the SPFA League One player of the year for 2014–15, as well as being included in the League One Team of the Year with teammate Mark Russell. He won the Player of the Year award.

=== Fleetwood Town ===
On 15 May 2015, McManus signed a pre-contract agreement with Fleetwood Town. On 31 December 2015, McManus returned for his third loan spell with Morton. In July 2016, McManus returned to Scotland, joining Scottish Championship side Raith Rovers on loan. In May 2017 he left Fleetwood at the end of his contract

=== Dunfermline Athletic ===
McManus returned north to Scotland in June 2017, signing for Scottish Championship side Dunfermline Athletic on a one-year deal.

=== Ross County ===
McManus signed for Ross County in June 2018 and was loaned to Falkirk on 16 July 2019. McManus was released by County in May 2020, following the end of his contract.

=== Dunfermline return ===
Following his release from County, McManus re-signed for Dunfermline Athletic on 10 July 2020, joining the club on a two-year deal.

=== The New Saints ===
After one season with Dunfermline, McManus moved to Cymru Premier club The New Saints on 14 June 2021, for a fee of £60,000. McManus scored a second half penalty to secure the Welsh side's first ever win in a competitive European match, defeating FC Astana 2-0.

=== Coleraine ===
On 31 January 2025 he joined Coleraine. He scored his first goal for the club on 8 March as the club defeated Glenavon in a league game. He left the club by mutual consent in January 2026.

=== Bangor City 1876 ===
In January 2026 he joined Welsh third-tier side Bangor City 1876. In June 2026 he recommitted himself to the club for the 2026–27 Cymru North season. During the 2026–27 season he was briefly interim player-manager before the permanent appointment of Huw Griffiths as club manager.

== International career ==
Having represented Scotland in U18 and U19 Levels, McManus was called up for the U21 squad in 2014.

== Career statistics ==
As of 26 December 2024

Appearances and goals by club, season and competition
Club	Season	League			FA Cup		League Cup		Other		Total	
Club	Season	Division	Apps	Goals	Apps	Goals	Apps	Goals	Apps	Goals	Apps	Goals
Aberdeen	2011–12	Scottish Premier League	2	0	0	0	0	0	0	0	2	0
Aberdeen	2012–13	Scottish Premier League	7	0	0	0	0	0	0	0	7	0
Aberdeen	2013–14	Scottish Premiership	3	0	0	0	0	0	0	0	3	0
Aberdeen	2014–15	Scottish Premiership	0	0	0	0	0	0	1 (Note: Appearance in the Europa League)	0	1	0
Aberdeen	Total		12	0	0	0	0	0	1	0	13	0
Alloa Athletic (loan)	2013–14	Scottish Championship	18	1	0	0	1	0	0	0	19	1
Greenock Morton (loan)	2014–15	Scottish League One	19	9	0	0	1	0	1 (Note: Appearances in the Scottish Challenge Cup)	3	21	12
Greenock Morton (loan)	2014–15	Scottish League One	13	11	0	0	0	0	0	0	13	11
Greenock Morton (loan)	Total		32	20	0	0	1	0	1	3	34	23
Fleetwood Town	2015–16	Football League One	7	1	1	0	1	0	1 (Note: Appearance in the Football League Trophy)	0	10	1
Fleetwood Town	2016–17	EFL League One	0	0	0	0	0	0	0	0	0	0
Fleetwood Town	Total		7	1	1	0	1	0	1	0	10	1
Greenock Morton (loan)	2015–16	Scottish Championship	17	4	3	0	0	0	0	0	20	4
Raith Rovers (loan)	2016–17	Scottish Championship	34	5	2	1	2	0	3 (Note: Appearance in the Championship play-offs)	3	41	9
Dunfermline Athletic	2017–18	Scottish Championship	32	7	2	2	5	3	5 (Note: Appearance in the Premiership play-offs)	1	44	13
Ross County	2018–19	Scottish Championship	32	2	3	0	5	1	5	1	45	4
Falkirk (loan)	2019–20	Scottish League One	26	19	4	2	3	3	1	0	34	24
Dunfermline Athletic	2020–21	Scottish Championship	27	9	1	0	6	1	2 (Note: Appearances in the Scottish Championship play-off)	0	36	10
The New Saints	2021–22	Welsh Premier League	28	24	3	1	0	0	6 (Note: Appearances in the Europa Conference League Qualifiers)	6	37	31
The New Saints	2022–23	Welsh Premier League	25	29	4	3	0	0	4 (Note: 2 appearances in the Europa League & 2 appearances in Champions League)	0	33	32
The New Saints	2023–24	Welsh Premier League	18	13	3	5	2	0	3 (Note: Appearance & 1 goal in UEFA Champions League, two appearances & 2 goals in UEFA Europa Conference League)	3	26	21
The New Saints	2024–25	Welsh Premier League	12	5	2	1	1	2	12 (Note: Four appearances in UEFA Champions League, two appearances in UEFA Europa League six appearances & 1 goal in UEFA Europa Conference League)	1	27	9
The New Saints	Total		83	71	12	10	3	2	25	10	123	93
Career total			320	139	28	15	26	10	44	18	418	182

== Honours ==
Greenock Morton

- Scottish League One: 2014–15

Ross County

- Scottish Championship: 2018–19
- Scottish Challenge Cup: 2018–19

The New Saints

- Cymru Premier: 2021–22, 2022-23, 2023-24
- Scottish Challenge Cup Runner-up: 2018–19

Bangor City 1876

- Ardal NW: 2025–26
- FAW Trophy: 2025–26

Individual

- PFA Scotland League One Player of the Year: 2014–15
- PFA Scotland League One Team of the Year: 2014–15
- Greenock Telegraph Player of the Year: 2014–15
- SPFL Championship Player of the Month: February 2016
- Cymru Premier Player of the Season: 2021–22
