= Romario Sabajo =

Dutch footballer (born 1989)

Personal information
- Date of birth: 1 February 1989 (age 37)
- Place of birth: Haarlem, Netherlands
- Height: 5 ft 11 in (1.80 m)
- Position: Winger

Team information
- Current team: JOS Watergraafsmeer

Youth career
- HFC Haarlem
- 2004–2008: PSV Eindhoven

Senior career*
| Years | Team | Apps | (Gls) |
| 2008–2011 | PSV Eindhoven | 0 | (0) |
| 2013–2014 | FC Lienden | 25 | (3) |
| 2015 | Greenock Morton | 7 | (0) |
| 2016–2017 | VPV Purmersteijn | ? | (?) |
| 2017–2018 | JOS Watergraafsmeer | ? | (?) |
| 2018-2019 | FC Hilversum | ? | (?) |
| 2019- | AFC DWS | ? | (?) |
- * Club domestic league appearances and goals as of 2 January 2019

Romario Sabajo (born 1 February 1989) is a Dutch professional footballer who last played as a winger for lower league Dutch club AFC DWS.

He has played senior football for FC Lienden and Greenock Morton, after coming through the youth systems of HFC Haarlem and PSV Eindhoven.

== Career ==
Sabajo moved to PSV Eindhoven in 2004, from his local club HFC Haarlem. As a regular in the Jong PSV side, he was on the verge on breaking into the first team, making the bench in an Eredivisie game in 2009.

He joined FC Lienden in the Dutch third tier in 2013 to regain his fitness after a serious injury before moving to Scotland to join up with NLSL Premier Football Coaching, from where he and Ricardo Talu earned trials at Greenock Morton.

In August 2015, Sabajo received international clearance to sign for Morton after a three-week wait. In December 2015, it was announced that Sabajo would return home as he was not going to have his contract renewed. On his return to The Netherlands, Sabajo signed for lower league side VPV Purmersteijn.

After a season, Sabajo moved to JOS Watergraafsmeer in Amsterdam.

== Personal life ==
Sabajo is of Surinamese descent.

== See also ==
- Greenock Morton F.C. season 2015-16
