= Dylan Stevenson =

Scottish footballer

Personal information
- Date of birth: 17 February 1997 (age 29)
- Place of birth: [[Pollock], Scotland
- Height: 1.78 m (5 ft 10 in)
- Position: Midfielder

Team information
- Current team: Troon
- Number: 11

Youth career
- TASS Rovers
- Ayr United
- –2015: Greenock Morton

Senior career*
Years	Team	Apps	(Gls)
2015–2016	Greenock Morton	47	(6)
2015	→ Dalry Thistle (loan)	?	(?)
2015–2016	→ Berwick Rangers (loan)	15	(0)
2016–2017	Auchinleck Talbot	?	(?)
2017–2018	Dalry Thistle	?	(?)
2018	→ Largs Thistle (loan)	3	(1)
2018–	Troon	?	(?)
- * Club domestic league appearances and goals as of 9 August 2018

Dylan Stevenson (born 17 February 1997) is a Scottish professional footballer who plays as a midfielder.

He started his career with Greenock Morton and had loan spells with Berwick Rangers and Dalry Thistle. He moved permanently to the Junior game in 2016 when he transferred from Morton to Auchinleck Talbot, and then back to Dalry from where he also had a loan spell at Largs Thistle.

== Career ==
Before joining Morton, Stevenson played for Ayrshire youth side TASS Rovers.

Before making his debut for Morton, Stevenson joined Dalry Thistle on loan. After a couple of substitute appearances in the cups, Stevenson made his league debut against Hibernian on 15 August 2015 as a late replacement for Mark Russell. With the development league in its winter shutdown, Stevenson went on a development loan to Berwick Rangers in December 2015. He signed a six-month deal at Morton in May 2016.

In August 2016, he left Morton by mutual consent to join Auchinleck Talbot.

He moved back to Dalry Thistle for a season before signing with Troon in 2018, after a brief loan spell at Largs Thistle.

== Personal life ==
Stevenson attended Garnock Academy.

== Honours ==
Morton

- SPFL Development League West: Winners 2015-16

Dalry Thistle

- Scottish Junior Football Ayrshire Division One: Winners 2017-18

== See also ==
- Greenock Morton F.C. season 2015–16
