= Sean Crighton =

Scottish footballer (born 1990)

Personal information
- Date of birth: 26 March 1990 (age 36)
- Place of birth: Greenock, Scotland
- Position: Central defender

Team information
- Current team: Queen's Park (head coach)

Senior career*
Years	Team	Apps	(Gls)
2008–2009	St Mirren	0	(0)
2008–2009	→ Montrose (loan)	18	(0)
2009–2012	Montrose	88	(2)
2012–2014	Elgin City	68	(2)
2014–2015	Greenock Morton	30	(0)
2015–2016	Airdrieonians	36	(4)
2016–2017	Livingston	32	(1)
2017–2018	Brechin City	34	(1)
2018–2021	Airdrieonians	79	(1)
2021-2023	Stenhousemuir	63	(9)
2023–2024	Dumbarton	33	(2)

Managerial career
- 2022–2023: Stenhousemuir (caretaker)
- 2025–: Queen's Park
- * Club domestic league appearances and goals

Sean Crighton (born 26 March 1990) is a Scottish former footballer and coach who is currently the head coach of Queen's Park. Crighton began his career with St Mirren, and has also played for Montrose, Elgin City, Greenock Morton, Airdrieonians, Livingston, Brechin City, Stenhousemuir and Dumbarton. During his playing time at Stenhousemuir, Crighton performed the role of caretaker manager.

== Playing career ==
Crighton began his career as a youth player with Scottish Premier League club St Mirren, spending a season on loan with Montrose before moving permanently to the club in June 2009.

After three years and almost 100 appearances, Crighton left Montrose to sign a two-year contract with Elgin City in 2012, spending two seasons with the side before being released at the end of the 2013–14 season.

Crighton subsequently signed for hometown club Greenock Morton in June 2014, helping the club win Scottish League One. Crighton was released by Morton shortly after the league win, moving east to sign with Airdrieonians after just a month without a club.

After his spell with the Diamonds, he signed for a season with Livingston where he captained the club to the League One title, before joining newly promoted Scottish Championship side Brechin City in July 2017. Crighton left Brechin at the end of the 2017–18 season.

On 3 May 2018, Crighton agreed a deal to return for a second spell at Airdrieonians, remaining with the club until May 2021. He then signed for Stenhousemuir. After two seasons with the Warriors, Crighton joined Dumbarton in May 2023. He signed an extended deal and helped the club to promotion via the play-offs in his first season as a Sons player, before leaving to become a manager of the B team at Queen's Park in June 2024.

== Coaching career ==
In April 2018, Crighton was promoted to head of the academy pathway at Greenock Morton. He left his role in August 2019, to take up coaching positions with the Airdrieonians first team and the Hamilton Academical youth academy.

After the departure of manager Stephen Swift, Crighton was named as caretaker manager of Stenhousemuir on 7 December 2022. He performed the role until the appointment of Gary Naysmith as manager on 3 January 2023.

After stints coaching the Queen's Park B team and assisting caretaker manager Steven MacLean, Crighton was appointed their head coach in May 2025.

== Career total ==
As of 08:24, 18 May 2024 (UTC)

Appearances and goals by club, season and competition
Club	Season	League			Scottish Cup		League Cup		Other		Total	
Club	Season	Division	Apps	Goals	Apps	Goals	Apps	Goals	Apps	Goals	Apps	Goals
Montrose (loan)	2008–09	Scottish Third Division	18	0	0	0	0	0	0	0	18	0
Montrose	2009–10	Scottish Third Division	29	0	4	0	1	0	1 (Note: Appearances in the Scottish Challenge Cup)	0	35	0
Montrose	2010–11	Scottish Third Division	33	1	5	0	1	0	1	0	40	1
Montrose	2011–12	Scottish Third Division	26	1	3	0	1	0	1	0	31	1
Montrose	Total		88	2	12	0	3	0	3	0	106	2
Elgin city	2012–13	Scottish Third Division	35	0	3	0	1	0	1	0	40	0
Elgin city	2013–14	Scottish League Two	33	2	1	0	1	1	2	1	37	4
Elgin city	Total		68	2	4	0	2	1	3	1	77	4
Greenock Morton	2014–15	Scottish League One	30	0	3	0	2	0	2	0	37	0
Airdrieonians	2015–16	Scottish League One	36	4	2	0	2	0	1	1	41	5
Livingston	2016–17	Scottish League One	32	1	2	0	4	0	4	1	42	2
Brechin City	2017–18	Scottish Championship	34	1	2	0	4	0	0	0	40	1
Airdrieonians	2018–19	Scottish League One	36	1	2	0	4	2	2	0	44	3
Airdrieonians	2019–20	Scottish League One	26	0	2	2	4	0	2	0	34	2
Airdrieonians	2020–21	Scottish League One	17	0	1	0	4	0	0	0	25	0
Airdrieonians	Total		79	1	5	2	12	2	4	0	103	5
Stenhousemuir	2021–22	Scottish League Two	33	3	2	0	4	0	0	0	39	3
Stenhousemuir	2022–23	Scottish League Two	30	6	2	0	4	0	1	0	37	6
Stenhousemuir	Total		63	9	4	0	8	0	1	0	76	9
Dumbarton	2023–24	Scottish League Two	33	2	3	0	4	0	6	0	46	2
Career total			480	22	37	2	41	3	24	3	568	30

=== Managerial statistics ===
As of 14 November 2026

Team	From	To	Record					
Team	From	To	G	W	D	L	Win %	
Stenhousemuir (caretaker)	7 December 2022	3 January 2023	2	0	0	2	0.00	
Queen's Park	15 May 2025	Present	65	18	17	30	27.69	
Career Total			67	18	17	32	26.87	—

== Honours ==
=== Morton ===
- Scottish League One: 2014–15

=== Livingston ===
- Scottish League One: 2016–17
