= Ross Caldwell =

Scottish footballer (born 1993)

Personal information
- Date of birth: 26 October 1993 (age 33)
- Place of birth: Bellshill, Scotland
- Positions: Midfielder; forward

Team information
- Current team: Darvel

Senior career*
Years	Team	Apps	(Gls)
2011–2014	Hibernian	21	(2)
2014	→ Alloa Athletic (loan)	12	(2)
2014–2015	St Mirren	13	(0)
2015	Greenock Morton	17	(4)
2015–2016	Ayr United	17	(4)
2016	Cowdenbeath	16	(1)
2016–2017	Brechin City	27	(5)
2017	East Kilbride		
2017–2020	Blantyre Victoria		
2020–	Darvel		

International career^{‡}
2008	Scotland U16	1	(0)
- * Club domestic league appearances and goals as of 08:00, 14 December 2020 (UTC) ‡ National team caps and goals as of 8 November 2013

Ross Caldwell (born 26 October 1993) is a Scottish footballer who plays as a midfielder or striker for Darvel.

Caldwell has previously played for Hibernian, Alloa Athletic, St Mirren, Greenock Morton, Ayr United, Cowdenbeath, Brechin City, and Blantyre Victoria.

== Career ==
Caldwell, who was educated at Hamilton Grammar School, started playing football relatively late in childhood. He played for various boys teams before joining the youth system of Edinburgh professional club Hibernian (Hibs). Hibs manager Pat Fenlon added Caldwell to the first team squad soon after he took charge in November 2011. Caldwell was named as a substitute in a game against Motherwell, but was prevented from playing because the match was abandoned. He made his senior debut on 10 December 2011, appearing as a substitute in a 2–0 defeat against Rangers. Caldwell agreed a new two-year contract with Hibs in March 2012.

Caldwell was mainly used as a substitute during the 2012–13 season. In his second starting appearance for Hibs, he scored a match-winning goal against Hearts at Tynecastle on 12 May 2013. He made seven first team appearances in the early months of the 2013–14 season, but did not play for Hibs after 30 November. Caldwell was loaned to Alloa Athletic in January 2014 for the rest of the season. He scored a goal in his first appearance for Alloa, in a 3–1 defeat against Queen of the South.

Caldwell went on trial with St Mirren in July 2014 and subsequently signed a one-year contract with the club, with the option of a second year. After limited appearances for the club, Caldwell terminated his contract by mutual consent on 9 January 2015. In his time at the club, Caldwell made 15 appearances, scoring two goals.

On the same day Caldwell left St Mirren, he signed a contract with Scottish League One side Greenock Morton until the end of season 2014–15. He was released by Morton at the end of the season. In July 2015, Caldwell signed for Ayr United on a six-month deal. At the start of January 2016, Caldwell was released by Ayr United having made 22 appearances, scoring five times for the side. He subsequently signed for league rivals Cowdenbeath shortly after his released from Ayr. Caldwell left Central Park and just four months, signing for Brechin City in June 2016. Caldwell was released by the club on 30 May 2017, after one season at Glebe Park.

On 3 October 2020, Caldwell announced that he had joined West of Scotland Football League side Darvel ahead of the upcoming season.

=== International ===
Caldwell was invited to a training camp of the Scotland national under-19 football team in March 2011.

== Career statistics ==
As of 30 May 2017

Appearances and goals by club, season and competition
Club	Season	League			Scottish Cup		League Cup		Other		Total	
Club	Season	Division	App	Goals	App	Goals	App	Goals	App	Goals	App	Goals
Hibernian	2011–12	Premier League	1	0	0	0	0	0	0	0	1	0
Hibernian	2012–13	Premier League	17	2	2	0	0	0	0	0	19	2
Hibernian	2013–14	Premiership	3	0	1	0	2	0	1 (Note: Appearance in the Europa League)	0	7	0
Hibernian	Total		21	2	3	0	2	0	1	0	27	2
Alloa Athletic (loan)	2013–14	Championship	12	2	0	0	0	0	0	0	12	2
St Mirren	2014–15	Premiership	13	0	0	0	2	2	0	0	15	2
Greenock Morton	2014–15	League One	17	4	0	0	0	0	0	0	17	4
Ayr United	2015–16	League One	17	4	1	0	2	0	2 (Note: Appearances in the Scottish Challenge Cup)	1	22	5
Cowdenbeath	2015–16	League One	16	1	0	0	0	0	2 (Note: Appearances in the League One play-offs)	0	18	1
Brechin City	2016–17	League One	27	5	1	0	4	0	6 (Note: Two appearances and a goal in the Scottish Challenge Cup; four appearances and two goals in the Championship play-offs)	3	38	8
East Kilbride	2017–18	Lowland League	0	0	0	0	3	0	0	0	3	0
Blantyre Victoria	2017–18	West of Scotland League; Central District, 1st Div.	4	4	0	0	—		0	0	4	4
Total			127	22	5	0	13	2	9	4	156	28

== Honours ==
Morton

- Scottish League One: Winners 2014–15
