= Bryan Wharton (footballer) =

Scottish association football player

Personal information
- Date of birth: 8 June 1990 (age 36)
- Place of birth: Hamilton, Scotland
- Position: Defender

Team information
- Current team: Arthurlie

Youth career
- Thorniewood United

Senior career*
Years	Team	Apps	(Gls)
2011-2012	Shotts Bon Accord	?	(?)
2014-2018	Queens Park	54	(2)
2017-2018	Pollok (loan)	?	(?)
2017-2018	Pollok	?	(?)
2018-2019	Albion Rovers	45	(0)
2020-2021	Pollok	?	(?)
2020-2021	Bo'ness United (loan)	?	(?)
2022-2023	Irvine Meadow	?	(?)
2023	Johnstone Burgh	2	(0)
2023-2024	Arthurlie	3	(1)
2024-	Troon	0	(0)
- * Club domestic league appearances and goals as of 05 August 2024

Bryan Wharton (born 8 June 1990) is a Scottish footballer who plays as a defender.
