= Michael Miller (footballer) =

Scottish footballer

Personal information
- Date of birth: 31 December 1994 (age 31)
- Place of birth: Glasgow, Scotland
- Positions: Defender; defensive midfielder

Youth career
- Celtic

Senior career*
Years	Team	Apps	(Gls)
2014	Celtic	0	(0)
2014	→ Dumbarton (loan)	12	(2)
2014–2016	Greenock Morton	48	(1)
2016–2017	Livingston	14	(3)
2019	Brechin City	8	(1)
2019–2020	Raith Rovers	19	(4)
2020–2022	Ayr United	21	(4)
2021–2022	→ Stenhousemuir (loan)	11	(1)
2022-2023	Stenhousemuir	50	(3)
2023-2024	Broomhill		
2024–2025	Dumbarton	21	(0)

International career^{‡}
2012	Scotland U18	2	(0)
2012	Scotland U19	3	(0)
2012	Scotland U20	1	(0)
- * Club domestic league appearances and goals as of 18:46, 12 April 2025 (UTC) ‡ National team caps and goals as of 13:40, 28 November 2016 (UTC)

Michael Miller (born 31 December 1994) is a Scottish footballer who last played as a defender or defensive midfielder for Scottish League Two club Dumbarton. Miller was in the Celtic youth system and has since played for Dumbarton, Brechin City, Livingston, Greenock Morton, Raith Rovers, Ayr United, Stenhousemuir and Broomhill.

Miller played for Scotland at under-18, under-19 and under-20 levels.

== Career ==
=== Club ===
Miller began his youth career at Celtic, spending a short time on loan at Dumbarton in 2014. In June that same year, Miller was released by Celtic and signed for Greenock Morton on a one-year contract. Miller scored his first goal for Morton as they defeated Peterhead to win the League One title in May 2015. At the end of the 2015–16 season, Miller signed with Livingston. Miller was released by the club at the end of the 2016–17 season.

After leaving Livingston, Miller had an unsuccessful trial spell at St Mirren. He joined Brechin City during the 2018–19 season, and made his league debut on 9 March 2019. After a season with Raith Rovers, Miller joined Ayr United in 2020. Ayr loaned him to Stenhousemuir in September 2021.

Miller signed permanently for Stenhousemuir in 2022. After a season in the Lowland League with Broomhill Miller joined Scottish League One Dumbarton in June 2024.

=== International ===
Miller made appearances for Scotland at under-18, under-19 and under-20 level in 2012 whilst at Celtic.

== Honours ==
=== Club ===
Greenock Morton

- Scottish League One: 2014–15

Livingston

- Scottish League One: 2016–17
