= Aidan Ferris =

Scottish footballer (born 1996)

Personal information
- Date of birth: 7 July 1996 (age 30)
- Place of birth: Paisley, Scotland
- Height: 5 ft 7 in (1.70 m)
- Position: Striker

Team information
- Current team: Benburb

Youth career
- 2011–2013: St Mirren

Senior career*
Years	Team	Apps	(Gls)
2013–2015	Greenock Morton	4	(0)
2014–2015	→ BSC Glasgow (loan)	7	(5)
2015–2017	BSC Glasgow	45	(29)
2017	East Kilbride	?	(?)
2017–2018	BSC Glasgow	?	(?)
2018–2019	Stirling University	?	(?)
2020–2021	Muirkirk	?	(?)
2021-	Benburb	?	(?)
- * Club domestic league appearances and goals as of 31 October 2021

Aidan Ferris (born 7 July 1996) is a Scottish footballer who plays as a striker for Benburb.

He previously played for Greenock Morton and St Mirren in the Scottish Professional Football League, and lower league clubs BSC Glasgow, East Kilbride, Stirling University and Muirkirk.

== Career ==
Born in Paisley, Ferris started his career at St Mirren before moving to local rivals Greenock Morton in the summer of 2013 to join their new full-time development squad. Ferris debuted for Ton as a half-time substitute on 21 December 2013 versus Falkirk.

In October 2014, Ferris joined BSC Glasgow in a loan deal and scored on his debut versus Dalbeattie Star. After returning from his loan spell, Ferris was given a contract extension with Ton until the end of the 2014–15 season. Ferris was then released from his contract with Ton at the end of that season.

Ferris then signed a two-year deal with BSC Glasgow in June 2015.

After his contract with BSC ended, Ferris signed for East Kilbride in June 2017. In September 2017 Ferris was released by East Kilbride after only 3 months with the club.

He then signed for Benburb where he was a regular in midfield before moving to Stirling University in July 2018.

== See also ==
- Greenock Morton F.C. season 2013-14 | 2014–15
