= Stefan Milojević (footballer, born 1991) =

Serbian footballer

Personal information
- Full name: Stefan Milojević
- Date of birth: 20 February 1991 (age 35)
- Place of birth: Brest, France
- Height: 1.93 m (6 ft 4 in)
- Position: Defender

Youth career
- Mallorca

Senior career*
Years	Team	Apps	(Gls)
2010	Dubnica	0	(0)
2011	Teleoptik	11	(0)
2012	Košice	1	(0)
2012–2013	BSK Borča	13	(0)
2013	Bežanija	4	(0)
2014	Airdrieonians	17	(0)
2014–2015	Greenock Morton	21	(1)
2015	ViOn Zlaté Moravce	4	(0)
- * Club domestic league appearances and goals

Stefan Milojević (Serbian Cyrillic: Стефан Милојевић; born 20 February 1991) is a Serbian football defender who last played for ViOn Zlaté Moravce. His father Goran Milojević was also a footballer.

== Club career ==
While at Spain, Milojević started his career at Mallorca before returning to Serbia, where he joined Teleoptik as a professional.

In January 2012, he joined Slovak club MFK Košice on a two-year contract. After six months at the club, Milojević joined BSK Borča in July 2012. Milojević have since moved to Bežanija.

In January 2014, Milojević have been training with Airdrieonians and then joined the club until the end of a season following a trial. He made his debut for the club on 11 January 2014, in a 3-0 win over Ayr United. Since making his debut, Milojević have established himself in the first team and made sixteen appearances for the club. He helped the club survive in League One that he was offered a new contract, but Milojević rejected it.

Milojević signed for Greenock Morton under freedom of contract in June 2014 one a year-contract and revealed that he was linked with a move to Dunfermline Athletic, but preferred to join Morton, citing a better option. Milojević scored his first goal, in a 2-1 win over Peterhead on 23 August 2014. After suffering an injury late on in the season, Milojević was released at the end of his contract.

== Honours ==
Morton

- Scottish League One: 2014-15

== Personal life ==
Born in Brest to a Serbian parents, Milojević moved to Spain when his father moved to a Spanish club and spent ten years in Spain, qualifying him for Spanish citizenship.

Milojević is the founder and president of a neo-Nazi biker gang called United Tribuns, which controls drug trafficking in Mallorca. In November 2025, he was arrested for alleged crimes of drug trafficking, arms trafficking, bribery and belonging to a criminal organization.
