= Nicolas Caraux =

French professional football goalkeeper (born 1991)

Personal information
- Date of birth: 4 March 1991 (age 35)
- Place of birth: Versailles, France
- Height: 1.90 m (6 ft 3 in)
- Position: Goalkeeper

Team information
- Current team: FC Versailles 78

Youth career
- RC Lens

Senior career*
Years	Team	Apps	(Gls)
2008–2012	RC Lens II	39	(0)
2012–2013	Edusport Academy	?	(?)
2013–2015	Greenock Morton	21	(0)
2016–2017	ACBB	9	(0)
2017	FC Versailles 78	2	(0)
2018	Atlanta United 2	7	(0)
2019–	FC Versailles 78	22	(0)
- * Club domestic league appearances and goals as of 7 October 2020

Nicolas Caraux (born 4 March 1991) is a French professional football goalkeeper who currently plays for FC Versailles 78.

== Career ==
Caraux came through the youth academy at RC Lens, before joining the Edusport Academy in Motherwell in 2012.

Nicolas signed with Scottish Championship side Greenock Morton in July 2013. He made his first competitive debut in a 1–0 defeat in the Scottish Challenge Cup to Annan Athletic.

In September 2013, he signed a contract extension until summer 2015. He was released by Morton in May 2015.

After a year without a club he signed for ACBB. He then played two league for Versailles, before moving to the United States.

On 6 February 2018, Caraux joined Atlanta United 2 of the United Soccer League.

== See also ==
- Greenock Morton F.C. season 2013-14 | 2014-15
