= Jamie McCormack =

Scottish footballer

Personal information
- Date of birth: 1 February 1992 (age 34)
- Place of birth: Stirling, Scotland
- Position: Defender

Team information
- Current team: Berwick Rangers
- Number: 15

Youth career
- –2011: Heart of Midlothian
- 2011–2014: Wigan Athletic

Senior career*
Years	Team	Apps	(Gls)
2014	Greenock Morton	10	(0)
2014–2015	Brechin City	10	(0)
2015–2017	Stenhousemuir	65	(6)
2017–2018	East Stirlingshire	?	(?)
2019–2021	BSC Glasgow	28	(4)
2021–2023	Bo'ness United	?	(?)
2023-	Berwick Rangers	?	(?)
- * Club domestic league appearances and goals as of 28 May August 2021

Jamie McCormack (born 1 February 1992) is a Scottish professional footballer who plays for Berwick Rangers in the Scottish Lowland Football League.

McCormack has previously played for Heart of Midlothian, Wigan Athletic, Greenock Morton, Brechin City, Stenhousemuir, East Stirlingshire, BSC Glasgow and Bo'ness United.

== Club career ==
McCormack signed for Wigan Athletic's development squad in 2011 after being released by Hearts. He left Wigan when his contract wasn't renewed, having been out for thirteen months after suffering a cruciate ligament injury.

In January 2014, McCormack signed for Scottish Championship side Greenock Morton on a free transfer. He left Morton after four months at the club, in May 2014.

On 25 July 2014, McCormack signed for Brechin City.

After playing two matches as a trialist, McCormack signed for Stenhousemuir on 30 January 2015. After two-and-a-half years with Stenhousemuir, McCormack was released at the end of the 2016–17 season.

McCormack signed for Lowland League club East Stirlingshire on 1 July 2017 and would later sign for league rivals BSC Glasgow in 2019.

Bo'ness United manager Max Christie signed McCormack in May 2021 on a precontract for the 2021-22 Lowland League season.
