= Stefan McCluskey =

Scottish footballer (born 1990)

Personal information
- Date of birth: 22 August 1990 (age 36)
- Place of birth: Bellshill, Scotland
- Height: 1.73 m (5 ft 8 in)
- Position: Winger

Team information
- Current team: Cumnock Juniors

Youth career
- Avonbridge Colts
- 2007–2008: Blantyre Victoria

Senior career*
| Years | Team | Apps | (Gls) |
| 2008–2009 | Airdrie United | 1 | (0) |
| 2009–2010 | Laighstonehall Academicals U21 | ? | (?) |
| 2010–2011 | Lanark United | ? | (?) |
| 2011–2012 | Shotts Bon Accord | ? | (?) |
| 2012–2014 | Clyde | 62 | (14) |
| 2014–2016 | Greenock Morton | 55 | (10) |
| 2016 | Peterhead | 10 | (0) |
| 2017 | Alloa Athletic | 12 | (1) |
| 2017–2019 | Pollok | 33 | (13) |
| 2019–2021 | Dumbarton | 28 | (0) |
| 2021–2023 | Forfar Athletic | 63 | (18) |
| 2023–2024 | Kelty Hearts | 30 | (1) |
| 2024– | Cumnock Juniors | | |
- * Club domestic league appearances and goals as of 17:00, 4 May 2024 (UTC)

Stefan McCluskey (born 22 August 1990) is a Scottish professional footballer who plays as a winger for Lowland League West club Cumnock Juniors. McCluskey, who started his career with Blantyre Victoria, has also played for Airdrie United, Shotts Bon Accord, Clyde, Greenock Morton, Peterhead, Alloa Athletic, Pollok, Dumbarton, Forfar Athletic and Kelty Hearts.

== Career ==
McCluskey's first senior club was Airdrie United, after signing from junior side Blantyre Vics. He made his senior debut in the Scottish Football League First Division as a substitute in a 4–0 reverse against St Johnstone.

After release by Airdrie, he played amateur with Laighstonehall Academicals, before having a nomadic career in the juniors with Lanark United and Shotts Bon Accord punctuated with a short trial spell with Albion Rovers.

After scoring 24 goals for Shotts, McCluskey rejoined the senior game with a transfer to Clyde, then when manager Jim Duffy moved to Greenock Morton he took McCluskey with him despite interest from East Fife.

After winning the title in 2014–15, McCluskey was given a one-year contract extension, however he left the club at the end of that contract in May 2016. In August of that year, McCluskey signed for Scottish League One side Peterhead, making his first appearance as a substitute against Albion Rovers. McCluskey's time with Peterhead was, however, short, with the winger leaving the club in November 2016 after a disagreement with manager Jim McInally.

He signed for Alloa Athletic in January 2017 until the end of the season. He made his debut in the Scottish Cup against Dunfermline Athletic and scored a 68th minute consolation goal in a 3–2 defeat. At the end of his contract, McCluskey left Alloa and signed for SJFA West Premier Division club Pollok.

McCluskey was transfer listed in August 2018 as he sought to return to the senior game.

On 31 May 2019, it was confirmed that McCluskey had signed a one-year deal with Scottish League One side Dumbarton having scored 13 times in 33 league games for Pollok. He renewed his contract with the Sons in July 2020. After an injury hit 2020–21 season however he left the club in March 2021 after shoulder surgery ruled him out for the season.

After leaving Dumbarton, McCluskey joined Scottish League Two side Forfar Athletic in June 2021 on a one-year deal.

== Honours ==
Morton

- Scottish League One: Winners 2014–15
