= Jordan Cairnie =

Scottish footballer

Personal information
- Date of birth: 26 May 1996 (age 30)
- Place of birth: Irvine, Scotland
- Positions: Defender; forward

Youth career
- Tass Thistle
- Ardrossan Winton Rovers

Senior career*
Years	Team	Apps	(Gls)
2013–2016	Greenock Morton	2	(0)
2015	→ Ardrossan Winton Rovers (loan)	10	(2)
2015–2016	→ East Stirlingshire (loan)	19	(2)
2016	Kilwinning Rangers	?	(?)
2016–2018	Ardrossan Winton Rovers	19	(5)
- * Club domestic league appearances and goals as of 10 September 2018

Jordan Cairnie (born 26 May 1996) is a Scottish professional footballer who plays as a defender or a striker who last played for Ardrossan Winton Rovers.

== Career ==
Cairnie, who attended Ardrossan Academy, made his debut for Greenock Morton in the Scottish Championship on 29 March 2014, in a defeat against Queen of the South. In May 2014 he signed a two-year full-time contract with the club, keeping him at Cappielow until 2016.

Cairnie had a spell on loan with Ardrossan Winton Rovers, who he previously played with at youth level. With the club, Cairnie scored two goals, helping them to win the Ayrshire District League.

In October 2015, Cairnie moved on loan to Scottish League Two side East Stirlingshire until 6 January 2016. He made his Shire debut in a home victory over Elgin City and scored his first senior goal in a 3–1 win over Montrose at Ochilview.

Cairnie was released by Morton at the end of April 2016, and signed for Ayrshire Junior side Kilwinning Rangers. He quickly moved on to Ardrossan Winton Rovers for the third time, when ex-Morton coach Sandy MacLean took over as manager.

== Honours ==
Ardrossan Winton Rovers

- SJFA West Region – Ayrshire District League: 2014–15

Morton

- SPFL Development League West: Winners 2015-16
