= 2014–15 Scottish League One =

Scottish League One
- Season: 2014–15
- Champions: Greenock Morton
- Promoted: Greenock Morton
- Relegated: Stirling Albion
- Matches: 180
- Biggest home win: Stranraer 5–0 Peterhead (28 October 2014)
- Biggest away win: Stirling Albion 0–5 Brechin City (13 September 2014)
- Highest scoring: Stenhousemuir 4–5 Stirling Albion (23 August 2014)

The 2014–15 Scottish League One was the 21st season in the current format of 10 teams in the third-tier of Scottish football.

== Teams ==
Peterhead and Stirling Albion were promoted respectively as 2013–14 Scottish League Two champions and 2013–14 Scottish League One play-off winners, whilst Greenock Morton were relegated from the 2013–14 Scottish Championship.

=== Stadia and locations ===
Location of teams in 2014–15 Scottish League One

Team	Location	Stadium	Capacity
Airdrieonians	Airdrie	Excelsior Stadium	10,101
Ayr United	Ayr	Somerset Park	10,185
Brechin City	Brechin	Glebe Park	4,083
Dunfermline Athletic	Dunfermline	East End Park	11,480
Forfar Athletic	Forfar	Station Park	6,777
Greenock Morton	Greenock	Cappielow Park	11,589
Peterhead	Peterhead	Balmoor	3,150
Stenhousemuir	Stenhousemuir	Ochilview Park	3,746
Stirling Albion	Stirling	Forthbank Stadium	3,808
Stranraer	Stranraer	Stair Park	4,178

=== Personnel ===
Team	Manager	Manufacturer	Sponsors
Airdrieonians	(Scotland) Gary Bollan	Puma	Annick Structures Ltd
Ayr United	(Scotland) Ian McCall	Adidas	Bodog
Brechin City	(Scotland) Ray McKinnon	Pendle	Delson
Dunfermline Athletic	(Scotland) John Potter	Joma	The Purvis Group
Forfar Athletic	(Scotland) Dick Campbell	Pendle	Orchard Timber Products
Greenock Morton	(Scotland) Jim Duffy	Nike	Millions Sweets
Peterhead	(Scotland) Jim McInally	Adidas	Kerloch Oil Tools
Stenhousemuir	(Scotland) Brown Ferguson (Caretaker)	CiC	Gulnar Tandoori Restaurant
Stirling Albion	(Scotland) Stuart McLaren	Macron	Prudential Insurance
Stranraer	(Scotland) Stephen Aitken	Stanno	Stena Line

== League table ==
Pos	Team	Pld	W	D	L	GF	GA	GD	Pts	Promotion or relegation
1	Greenock Morton (C, P)	36	22	3	11	65	40	+25	69	Promotion to the Championship
2	Stranraer	36	20	7	9	59	38	+21	67	Qualification for the Championship play-offs
3	Forfar Athletic	36	20	6	10	59	43	+16	66	Qualification for the Championship play-offs
4	Brechin City	36	15	14	7	58	46	+12	59	Qualification for the Championship play-offs
5	Airdrieonians	36	16	10	10	53	39	+14	58	
6	Peterhead	36	14	9	13	51	54	−3	51	
7	Dunfermline Athletic	36	13	9	14	46	48	−2	48	
8	Ayr United	36	9	7	20	45	60	−15	34	
9	Stenhousemuir (O)	36	8	5	23	42	63	−21	29	Qualification for the League One play-offs
10	Stirling Albion (R)	36	4	8	24	35	84	−49	20	Relegation to League Two

Source: SPFL
Rules for classification: 1) points; 2) goal difference; 3) number of goals scored.
(C) Champions; (O) Play-off winners; (P) Promoted; (R) Relegated

== Results ==
=== First half of season ===
Home \ Away	AIR	AYR	BRE	DNF	FOR	GMO	PET	STE	STI	STR
Airdrieonians		3–0	4–0	3–1	1–2	0–1	0–2	2–0	0–0	3–3
Ayr United	2–3		0–2	0–1	2–0	1–0	3–3	2–3	2–2	0–2
Brechin City	1–1	2–4		1–1	3–3	3–1	1–1	1–0	2–1	1–2
Dunfermline Athletic	3–0	4–2	0–0		0–0	1–2	3–0	2–0	4–0	0–1
Forfar Athletic	1–1	2–0	3–1	2–0		3–2	1–0	3–0	2–1	1–1
Greenock Morton	2–1	0–1	2–2	2–1	2–0		0–1	3–1	2–0	4–0
Peterhead	1–1	2–0	1–1	1–1	3–2	1–2		1–0	1–1	1–4
Stenhousemuir	1–0	1–1	0–2	1–0	0–2	2–1	1–2		4–5	2–2
Stirling Albion	2–2	1–3	0–5	0–2	2–2	3–4	2–3	0–4		1–1
Stranraer	1–0	3–1	2–2	1–2	1–1	2–0	5–0	0–2	2–0	

Updated to match(es) played on 10 March 2015. Source: BBC Sport
Legend: Blue = home team win; Yellow = draw; Red = away team win.

=== Second half of season ===
Home \ Away	AIR	AYR	BRE	DNF	FOR	GMO	PET	STE	STI	STR
Airdrieonians		2–0	1–1	3–2	3–1	2–1	1–3	2–1	4–1	1–1
Ayr United	0–1		2–2	0–2	1–0	1–1	2–4	0–0	4–0	0–2
Brechin City	0–0	2–1		3–0	2–3	1–1	2–2	2–1	2–1	1–3
Dunfermline Athletic	2–2	2–1	0–1		1–3	0–4	1–1	3–2	1–1	1–0
Forfar Athletic	2–0	1–3	0–2	1–0		1–2	3–1	1–0	4–0	1–0
Greenock Morton	0–1	2–1	0–2	2–0	0–2		3–1	3–2	4–0	2–0
Peterhead	0–1	2–0	3–0	1–1	1–0	1–3		2–0	2–1	1–2
Stenhousemuir	0–2	1–1	2–2	0–1	1–3	2–3	2–1		1–2	1–0
Stirling Albion	0–2	1–4	0–1	2–2	0–1	0–2	2–1	3–2		0–1
Stranraer	1–0	1–0	0–2	5–1	4–2	0–2	2–0	3–2	1–0	

Updated to match(es) played on 2 May 2015. Source: BBC Sport
Legend: Blue = home team win; Yellow = draw; Red = away team win.

== League One play-offs ==
The second bottom team in League one enters into a 4 team playoff with the teams from 2nd to 4th from League Two

=== Semi-finals ===
All times British Summer Time (UTC+1)

==== First leg ====
6 May 2015
19:45

Arbroath	2–2	Queen's Park
McWalter (red card) 23'; Murray 43', 64'	Report	Wharton 18'; Fraser 36'

Gayfield Park, Arbroath
Attendance: 837
Referee: Craig Charleston

6 May 2015
19:45

East Fife	1–1	Stenhousemuir
Brown 3'	Report	Lithgow 61'

Bayview Stadium, Methil
Attendance: 679
Referee: Euan Anderson

==== Second leg ====
9 May 2015
15:00

Queen's Park	1–0 (a.e.t.)	Arbroath
Quinn 118'	Report

Hampden Park, Glasgow
Attendance: 1,026
Referee: Andrew Dallas

Queen's Park win 3-2 on aggregate

9 May 2015
15:00

Stenhousemuir	3–1 (a.e.t.)	East Fife
Millar 2'; McCormack 94'; Sutherland 116'	Report	Page 87'

Ochilview Park, Stenhousemuir
Attendance: 799
Referee: John McKendrick

Stenhousemuir win 4-2 on aggregate

=== Final ===
The two semi-final winners play-off over two legs . the winner is awarded a place in the 2015–16 Scottish League One

==== First leg ====
13 May 2015
19:30

Queen's Park	0–1	Stenhousemuir
	Report	McCormack 55'

Hampden Park, Glasgow
Attendance: 811
Referee: Barry Cook

==== Second leg ====
16 May 2015
15:00

Stenhousemuir	1–1	Queen's Park
McMenamin 3'	Report	Fraser 36'

Ochilview Park, Stenhousemuir
Attendance: 1,165
Referee: Don Robertson

Stenhousemuir win 2-1 on aggregate

== Top scorers ==
As of 30 May 2015 (UTC)

Rank	Scorer	Club	Goals
1	(Scotland) Declan McManus	Greenock Morton	20
2	(Scotland) Colin McMenamin	Stenhousemuir	15
2	(Scotland) Alan Trouten	Brechin City	15
4	(Scotland) Bryan Prunty	Airdrieonians	14
5	(Scotland) Andy Jackson	Brechin City	11
5	(Scotland) Jamie Longworth	Stranraer	11
5	(Scotland) Gavin Swankie	Forfar Athletic	11
8	(Scotland) Dale Hilson	Forfar Athletic	10
8	(Scotland) Craig Malcolm	Stranraer	10
10	(Scotland) Alan Forrest	Ayr United	9
10	(Scotland) Willie Gibson	Stranraer	9
10	(Scotland) Jim Lister	Airdrieonians	9
