= Dylan (name) =

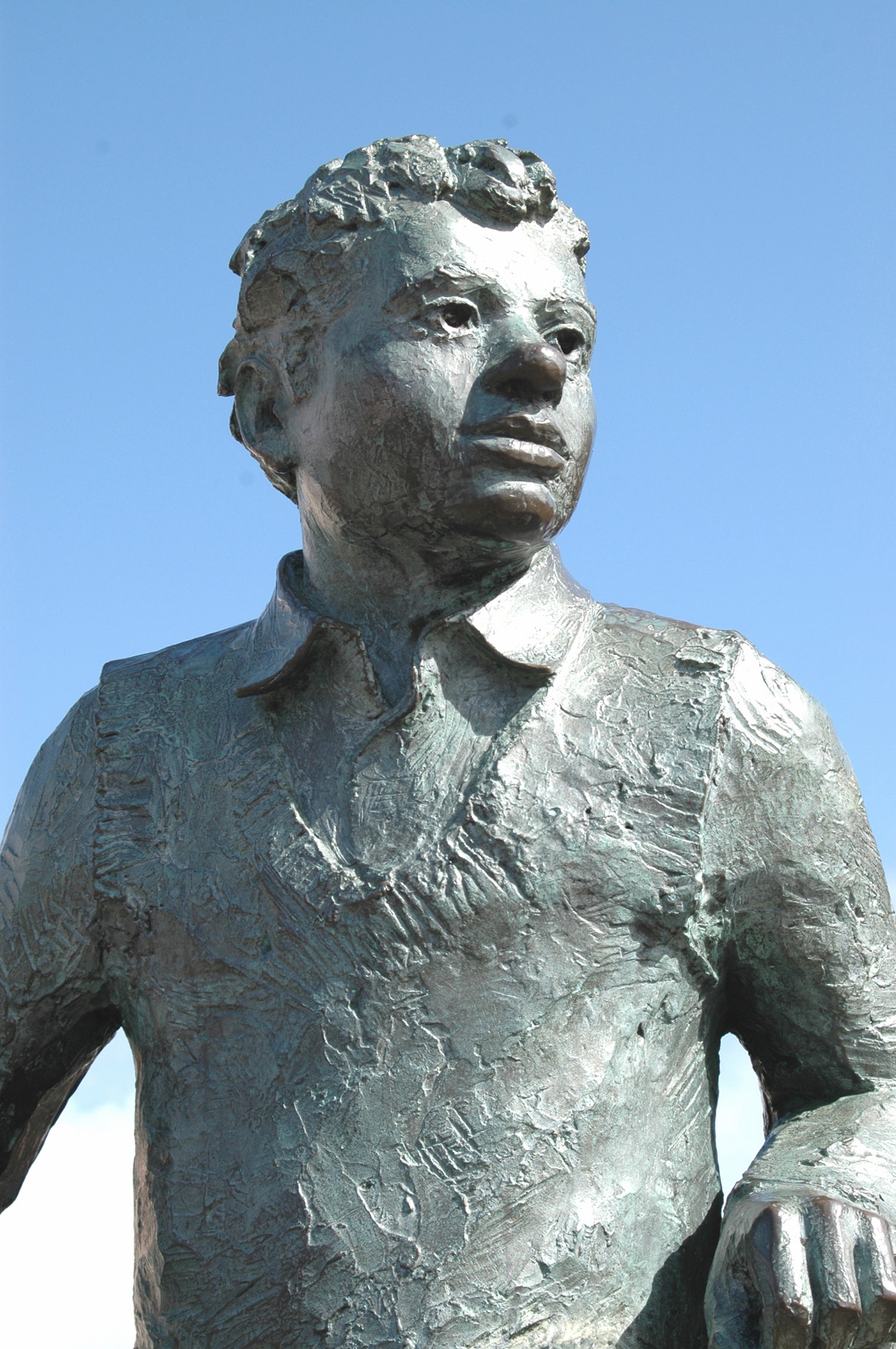
- Dylan Thomas statue in Swansea
- Pronunciation: Welsh: [ˈdə.lan] /ˈdɪ.lən/ Original pronunciation of Dylan Anglicised pronunciation of Dylan
- Gender: Unisex
- Language: Welsh, English

Origin
- Language: Welsh
- Origin: dy- + llanw
- Meaning: "son of the sea" or "born from the ocean"
- Region of origin: Wales

Other names
- Variant forms: Dylann, Dylon
- Related names: Dillon

Dylan is a given name and surname of Welsh origin. It means "son of the sea", "born from the ocean", or "great tide". It is derived from the Welsh words "dy," meaning "great," and "llanw," meaning "tide" or "sea".

In Welsh mythology, Dylan ail Don is a sea god or hero associated with the waves and tides in the Welsh mythic Mabinogion tales. Dylan may have served as a model for the Arthurian figure Dyonas, the father of the beautiful Vivian. In Wales, it was the most popular Welsh name given to boys in 2010.

== Notable people with the given name ==
=== Male ===
- Dylan Ababou (born 1986), Filipino former PBA player
- Dylan Addison (born 1987), Australian former AFL player
- Dylan Adjei-Hersey (born 2002), English professional footballer
- Dylan Ainsworth (born 1992), Canadian former CFL player
- Dylan Alcott (born 1990), Australian former wheelchair tennis- and basketball player, radio host, actor, foundation founder, business owner, and motivational speaker
- Dylan Alexis Romney (born 1996), French professional footballer
- Dylan Anderson, American indicted member of militant group Citizens for Constitutional Freedom
- Dylan Andrews (born 1979), New Zealand mixed martial artist
- Dylan Anhorn (born 1999), Canadian AHL player
- Dylan Armstrong (born 1981), Canadian athletics coach and competitive shot putter
- Dylan Arnold (born 1994), American actor
- Dylan Asonganyi (born 2000), English professional footballer
- Dylan Audsley (born 1994), American rugby union player
- Dylan Avery, American writer, director, editor, and producer of the Loose Change film series
- Dylan Axelrod (born 1985), American MLB pitcher
- Dylan Bachelet (born 2004), English pastry chef and television personality
- Dylan Bahamboula (born 1995), French-born Republic of the Congo professional footballer
- Dylan Baker (born 1959), American actor
- Dylan Baldi, American singer-songwriter; founder, guitarist, and lead singer of indie rock band Cloud Nothings
- Dylan Balliett, American past member of rock band The World Is a Beautiful Place & I Am No Longer Afraid to Die
- Dylan Barker (born 1986), Canadian former CFL player
- Dylan Barkers (born 2000), Dutch footballer
- Dylan Batubinsika (born 1996), French-born Democratic Republic of the Congo professional footballer
- Dylan Beard (born 1998), American hurdler
- Dylan Beaulieu (born 1997), French footballer
- Dylan Beavers (born 2001), American MLB player
- Dylan Behler (born 1998), American politician
- Dylan Bennett (born 1984), Dutch professional squash player
- Dylan Benoit (born 1988/1989), Canadian chef
- Dylan Berry (born 1974), American music composer, radio host, and entrepreneur
- Dylan Besseau (born 1997), Vietnamese-born French filmmaker and producer
- Dylan Beynon, American entrepreneur; founder of telemedicine company Mindbloom
- Dylan Bibic (born 2003), Canadian professional road- and track cyclist
- Dylan Bikey (born 1995), French professional footballer
- Dylan Blaha, American medical research scientist, and candidate in the 2026 United States House of Representatives elections in Illinois
- Dylan Blignaut (born 1995), South African-born German cricketer
- Dylan Blujus (born 1994), American former AHL player
- Dylan Borczak (born 1999), American USLC player
- Dylan Borge (born 2003), Gibraltarian semi-professional footballer
- Dylan Borlée (born 1992), Belgian sprinter
- Dylan Borrero (born 2002), Colombian professional footballer
- Dylan Bosch (born 1993), South African swimmer
- Dylan Boyack, American actor
- Dylan Boyle (born 2002), Northern Irish professional footballer
- Dylan Brady (born 1993), American music producer, singer, and songwriter; member of musical duo 100 gecs
- Dylan Brady (country singer) (born 1998), American pop recording artist, singer, and songwriter
- Dylan Bregeon (born 1994), French professional boxer
- Dylan Brody (born 1964), American humorist, playwright, author, and comedian
- Dylan Bronn (born 1995), French-born professional footballer
- Dylan Broom (born 2002), Welsh para swimmer
- Dylan Brown (born 2000), New Zealand professional rugby league footballer
- Dylan Browne McMonagle (born 2003), Irish jockey
- Dylan Bruce (born 1980), Canadian actor
- Dylan Bruno (born 1972), American actor and former model
- Dylan Buckley (born 1993), Australian former AFL player
- Dylan Budge (born 1995), Scottish cricketer
- Dylan Bundy (born 1992), American former MLB pitcher
- Dylan Burns, English-Australian past member of electronic music duo BodyRockers
- Dylan Butler (2006–2024), American perpetrator of the 2024 Perry High School shooting
- Dylan Byers, American journalist
- Dylan C. Jordan, American politician
- Dylan C. Penningroth, American historian and professor
- Dylan Campbell (born 2002), American MLB player
- Dylan Cantrell (born 1994), American former NFL player
- Dylan Cappello (born 1996), American professional stock car racing driver and crew chief
- Dylan Cardwell (born 2001), American NBA player
- Dylan Carlson (disambiguation), multiple people
- Dylan Carreiro (born 1995), Canadian professional soccer player
- Dylan Carey (born 2003), American baseball player
- Dylan Carter (swimmer) (born 1996), American-born Trinidad and Tobago competitive swimmer
- Dylan Cartlidge (born 1994), English rapper and multi-instrumentalist
- Dylan Casey (born 1971), American professional cyclist
- Dylan Cash (born 1994), American former child actor
- Dylan Castanheira (born 1995), American soccer player
- Dylan Caton (born 1995), Australian soccer player
- Dylan Cease (born 1995), American MLB pitcher
- Dylan Chambers, American member of rock band Moonalice
- Dylan Chambost (born 1997), French MLS player
- Dylan Chellamootoo (born 1995), French taekwondo practitioner
- Dylan Chiazor (born 1998), Dutch footballer
- Dylan Christie (born 2003), American racing driver
- Dylan Clark, American film producer of Chernin Entertainment
- Dylan Clarke (born 1998), Australian former AFL player
- Dylan Clayton (born 1974), British BMX rider
- Dylan Coghlan (born 1998), Canadian AHL- and NHL player
- Dylan Cole, American digital matte-painter and concept artist
- Dylan Cole (American football) (born 1994), American AFC- and NFL player
- Dylan Coleman (born 1996), American MLB pitcher
- Dylan Collard (born 2000), Australian professional footballer
- Dylan Collier (born 1991), New Zealand professional rugby union player
- Dylan Collins (born 1980), Irish software company founder and technology investor
- Dylan Connolly (born 1995), Irish professional footballer
- Dylan Connolly (footballer, born 2000), Irish footballer
- Dylan Cook (born 1998), American NFL player
- Dylan Covey (born 1991), American MLB pitcher
- Dylan Cozens (born 2001), Canadian NHL player
- Dylan Cozens (baseball) (born 1994), American former MLB player
- Dylan Cramer (born 1958), Canadian alto saxophonist, jazz musician, and author
- Dylan Cretin (born 1997), French rugby union player
- Dylan Crews (born 2002), American MLB player
- Dylan Crowe (born 2001), English professional footballer
- Dylan Cunningham (born 1994), American professional squash player
- Dylan Cuthbert, Japanese video game developer; founder of Q-Games
- Dylan Damraoui (born 1997), Belgian footballer
- Dylan Darling, American college basketball player
- Dylan Darmohoetomo (born 1992), Surinamese badminton player and coach
- Dylan Davies, British military contractor who was charged with assault
- Dylan Davis (born 1994), American thoroughbred jockey
- Dylan de Beer (born 1982), Zimbabwean cricketer
- Dylan de Braal (born 1994), Dutch footballer
- Dylan de Leeuw, South African rugby union footballer
- Dylan De Belder (born 1992), Belgian footballer
- Dylan De Bruycker (born 1997), Belgian-born Filipino professional footballer
- Dylan DeLucia (born 2000), American MLB pitcher
- Dylan DeMelo (born 1993), Canadian NHL player
- Dylan Demuynck (born 2004), Belgium-born Filipino professional footballer
- Dylan des Fountain (born 1985), South African professional rugby union footballer
- Dylan Deschamps (born 2002), Canadian freestyle skier
- Dylan Disu (born 2000), American professional basketball player
- Dylan Djete (born 2003), Canadian gridiron football player
- Dylan Dodd (born 1998), American MLB pitcher
- Dylan Donahue (born 1992), American IFL player, and former NFL- and CFL player
- Dylan Donkin, American rock musician
- Dylan Donnellan (born 1994), Irish rugby union player
- Dylan Dreiling (born 2003), American MLB player
- Dylan Dresdow, American audio engineer and mixer
- Dylan Drummond (born 2000), American NFL player
- Dylan Duffy (born 2002), Irish professional footballer
- Dylan Duke (born 2003), American AHL- and NHL player
- Dylan Dunlop-Barrett (born 1991), New Zealand swimmer
- Dylan Duo (born 1977), Gibraltarian professional darts player
- Dylan Durivaux (born 2001), French professional footballer
- Dylan Duventru (born 1989), French professional footballer
- Dylan Dykes (born 1996), Scottish footballer
- Dylan Eagleson, Irish boxer
- Dylan Easton (born 1994), Scottish footballer
- Dylan Edwards (born 1996), Australian professional rugby league footballer
- Dylan Edwards (American football) (born 2004), American college football player
- Dylan Efron (born 1992), American television personality and production coordinator
- Dylan Egan (born 2004), Australian professional rugby league footballer
- Dylan Ehler (born 2017), Canadian missing boy
- Dylan Eitharong (born 1991), Thai-American chef and restauranteur
- Dylan Emery (born 2001), Welsh professional snooker player
- Dylan Ennis (born 1991), Jamaican professional basketball player
- Dylan Escobar (born 2000), Chilean professional footballer
- Dylan Esmel (born 1998), Ivorian professional footballer
- Dylan Eti (born 2005), New Zealand rugby union player
- Dylan Evans (born 1966), British academic and author
- Dylan Evans (rugby union) (born 1989), Australian rugby union player
- Dylan Everett (born 1995), Canadian actor
- Dylan Fabre (born 2000), French professional ice hockey player
- Dylan Fage (born 1999), French professional footballer
- Dylan Fairchild (born 2003), American NFL player
- Dylan Farrell (born 1991), Australian professional rugby league footballer
- Dylan Fawsitt (born 1990), Irish-born American rugby union player and coach
- Dylan Fergus (born 1980), American actor, producer, and director
- Dylan Ferguson (disambiguation), several people
- Dylan Fernandes (born 1989), American politician
- Dylan Ferrandis (born 1994), French motorcycle racer
- Dylan Fetcho (born 2000), American professional stock car racing driver
- Dylan Field (born 1992), American billionaire technology businessman; co-founder of software company Figma
- Dylan File (born 1996), American professional baseball pitcher
- Dylan Fitterer, American video game designer; developer of the game Audiosurf
- Dylan Fitzell, Irish hurler
- Dylan Fletcher (born 1988), British sailor and Olympic champion
- Dylan Flores (born 1993), Costa Rican professional footballer
- Dylan Floro (born 1990), American MLB pitcher
- Dylan Fontani (born 1997), French professional footballer
- Dylan Fox (born 1994), Northern Irish professional footballer
- Dylan Frazier (born 2001), American professional pickleball player
- Dylan French (born 1997), Canadian fencer
- Dylan Frittelli (born 1990), South African professional golfer
- Dylan Gaither (born 2000), American college soccer player
- Dylan Gambrell (born 1996), American AHL- and NHL player
- Dylan Gandy (born 1982), American former NFL player
- Dylan Garand (born 2002), Canadian NHL player
- Dylan Gardner (born 1996), American singer-songwriter, producer, and musician
- Dylan Garner (born 1998), American professional stock car racing driver
- Dylan Gavin (born 2003), Irish footballer
- Dylan Geick (born 1998), American social media personality, writer, and wrestler
- Dylan George (born 1998), Dutch footballer
- Dylan Germana, American politician
- Dylan Giambatista, American politician and musician
- Dylan Giffen (born 1997), Canadian CFL player
- Dylan Gilmer (born 2009), American actor, rapper, and television host
- Dylan Girdlestone (born 1989), South African professional racing cyclist
- Dylan Gissi (born 1991), Swiss professional footballer
- Dylan Glaby (born 1996), Argentine professional footballer
- Dylan Godfrey, real name of Lil Windex (born 1992), Canadian rapper
- Dylan Golden Aycock (born 1985), American primitive guitarist and experimental musician
- Dylan Gossett (born 1999), American country singer-songwriter
- Dylan Graves (born 1997), American artist and curator
- Dylan Grimes (born 1991), Australian former AFL player
- Dylan Groene (?–2005), American murder victim
- Dylan Groenewegen (born 1993), Dutch professional road racing cyclist
- Dylan Guenther (born 2003), Canadian NHL player
- Dylan Guthro (born 1991), Canadian singer-songwriter
- Dylan Hadley, American member of indie pop duo Sharpie Smile
- Dylan Hanwright, American member of indie rock group Great Grandpa
- Dylan Harper (born 2006), American NBA player
- Dylan Hartley (born 1986), New Zealand-born English rugby union player
- Dylan Haskins (born 1987), Irish broadcaster, documentary maker, and producer
- Dylan Hayes (born 1994), New Zealand rugby union player
- Dylan Hessey (born 2003), English BMX cyclist
- Dylan Hicks (born 1970), American singer-songwriter, novelist, and DJ
- Dylan Higgins (born 1991), Zimbabwean cricketer
- Dylan Hill (born 2004), English professional footballer
- Dylan Hockley (?–2012), American victim of the Sandy Hook Elementary School shooting
- Dylan Hoffman, American actor
- Dylon Hoffpauir, American dancer, choreographer, coach, cheerleader, and Internet personality
- Dylan Holloway (born 2001), Canadian NHL player
- Dylan Holmes (disambiguation), several people
- Dylan Hondo (born 1995), Zimbabwean cricketer
- Dylan Hoogerwerf (born 1995), Dutch short track speed skater
- Dylan Hopkins (born 1999), American former college football player
- Dylan Horrocks (born 1966), New Zealand cartoonist
- Dylan Horton (born 2000), American NFL player
- Dylan Howard (born 1982), Australian-born American entertainment journalist and media executive
- Dylan Howard (basketball), American college basketball coach and former player
- Dylan Howe (born 1969), English drummer, bandleader, session musician, and composer
- Dylan Hudecki, Canadian past member of indie rock band By Divine Right
- Dylan Hughes (born 1985), Canadian-born Welsh footballer
- Dylan Hunter (born 1985), Canadian former AHL- and NHL player
- Dylan Hutchison (born 1994), American professional stock car racing driver
- Dylan Isidro Berdayes Ason (born 1998), Cuban chess grandmaster
- Dylan Jacobs (born 2000), American distance runner
- Dylan Jasso (born 2002), Mexican MLB player
- Dylan Jennings (born 1979), South African cricketer
- Dylan Jobe, American video game designer of Starhawk (2012 video game)
- Dylan Joel (born 1991), Australian musician, singer, and rapper
- Dylan John Riley (born 1971), American professor of sociology
- Dylan Jones (born 1960), English journalist and author
- Dylan Jones, Australian-born husband of Bo Songvisava (born 1979/1980), Thai chef and restaurateur
- Dylan Jones-Evans (born 1966), Welsh politician and blogger
- Dylan Jones (physicist), American-born Canadian atmospheric scientist and professor of physics
- Dylan Jordan (born 2005), American MLB pitcher
- Dylan Kadji (born 2003), English footballer
- Dylan Keefe (born 1970), American bassist and a founding member of alternative rock band Marcy Playground
- Dylan Keith Summers, real name of Necro Butcher (born 1973), American professional wrestler
- Dylan Kennett (born 1994), New Zealand professional racing cyclist
- Dylan Kerr (born 1967), Maltese-born English football manager and former professional player
- Dylan Kidd (born 1969), American film director, producer, and screenwriter
- Dylan Kight (born 1984), American singer-songwriter
- Dylan Kingwell (born 2004), Canadian actor
- Dylan Klebold (1981–1999), American mass murderer (one of the Columbine High School massacre perpetrators)
- Dylan Kuiper, Australian past member of alternative metalcore band Dream On Dreamer
- Dylan Kuo (born 1977), Taiwanese actor, singer, and model
- Dylan Kussman (born 1971), American film- and television writer and actor
- Dylan Kwasniewski (born 1995), American real estate broker, businessman, entrepreneur, and former professional stock car racing driver
- Dylan Lane, American former host of television game show Chain Reaction
- Dylan Lardelli (born 1979), New Zealand composer and guitarist
- Dylan Larkin (born 1996), American NHL player
- Dylan Laube (born 1999), American NFL player
- Dylan Lawlor (born 2006), Welsh professional footballer
- Dylan LeBlanc (born 1990), American singer-songwriter and guitarist
- Dylan LeBlanc, American past member of metalcore band Myka Relocate
- Dylan Lee (born 1994), American MLB pitcher
- Dylan Leicher, Namibian international cricketer
- Dylan Lempereur (born 1998), French professional footballer
- Dylan Leonard (born 2007), Australian professional soccer player
- Dylan Lesko (born 2003), American MLB pitcher
- Dylan Levitt (born 2000), Welsh professional footballer
- Dylan Lewis (born 1973), Australian television- and radio host
- Dylan Littlehales (born 1999), Australian paracanoeist
- Dylan Llewellyn (born 1992), English actor
- Dylan Lobban (born 2005), Scottish footballer
- Dylan Loewe, American speechwriter, political strategist, and author
- Dylan Lonergan (born 2004), American college football player
- Dylan Louiserre (born 1995), French footballer
- Dylan Lucas (born 2000), Australian professional rugby league footballer
- Dylan Lues, South African-born Irish cricketer
- Dylan Lupton (born 1993), American professional stock car racing driver
- Dylan Lyons (1998–2023), American television news reporter and murder victim
- Dylan Maart, South African rugby union footballer
- Dylan Mabin (born 1997), American NFL player
- Dylan Macallister (born 1982), Australian former soccer player and current coach
- Dylan MacDonald (born 2003), Scottish footballer
- Dylan Mackin (born 1997), Scottish footballer
- Dylan Macleod, Canadian cinematographer
- Dylan Main (born 1995), Australian WAFL player
- Dylan Maltz (born 1994), American professional lacrosse player
- Dylan Mandlsohn (born 1979/1980), Canadian stand-up comedian, impressionist, and actor
- Dylan Manickum (born 1992), New Zealand footballer and futsal player
- Dylan Mares (born 1992), American professional soccer player
- Dylan Marlowe (born 1997), American country music singer-songwriter
- Dylan Marron (born 1988), American actor, writer, and activist
- Dylan Marshall, Australian member of Afrobeat band Shaolin Afronauts
- Dylan Martin (born 1998), Australian field hockey player
- Dylan Matthews, American journalist
- Dylan Mattingly (born 1991), American composer
- Dylan Mavin, Australian motorcycle racer
- Dylan Mbayo (born 2001), Belgian professional footballer
- Dylan Mboumbouni (born 1996), French-born professional footballer
- Dylan McCaffrey, American college football player; son of Ed McCaffrey
- Dylan McCullough (born 2001), New Zealand triathlete
- Dylan McDermott (born 1961), American actor
- Dylan McDuffie (born 2000), American college football player
- Dylan McFarland (born 1980), American former NFL player
- Dylan McGeouch (born 1993), Scottish footballer
- Dylan McGowan (born 1991), Australian professional footballer
- Dylan McGrath (born 1977), Irish celebrity head chef
- Dylan McIlrath (born 1992), Canadian NHL player, and former WHL player
- Dylan McLachlan (born 1999), Australian cricketer
- Dylan McLaren (born 1982), Australian former AFL player
- Dylan McLaughlin (footballer) (born 1995), Scottish footballer
- Dylan McMahon (born 2001), American NFL player
- Dylan Meier (1984–2010), American football player
- Dylan Menzie, Canadian singer-songwriter
- Dylan Mertens (born 1995), Dutch professional footballer
- Dylan Meyer (disambiguation), several people
- Dylan Mika (1972–2018), New Zealand-born rugby union player
- Dylan Miley, real name of Lars Sullivan (born 1988), American professional wrestler
- Dylan Mills, real name of Dizzee Rascal (born 1984), English rapper, songwriter, and record producer
- Dylan Miner (born 1976), American artist and assistant professor
- Dylan Mingo, American high school basketball player
- Dylan Minnette (born 1996), American actor, singer, and musician
- Dylan Mohan Gray, Indian- and Canadian director, producer, and screenwriter
- Dylan Molloy (born 1995), American PLL player
- Dylan Mondegreen, Norwegian singer and songwriter
- Dylan Moonan (born 2002), English professional footballer
- Dylan Moore (born 1992), American MLB player
- Dylan Moore (footballer) (born 1999), Australian AFL player
- Dylan Moran (born 1971/1972), Irish comedian, writer, actor, and artist
- Dylan Morgan (1946–2011), Welsh mathematician, physicist, hypnotherapist, and author
- Dylan Morris, American college football coach and former player
- Dylan Moscovitch (born 1984), Canadian pair skater
- Dylan Moses (born 1998), American professional football player
- Dylan Moss (born 1998), Welsh rugby union player
- Dylan Mottley-Henry (born 1997), English professional footballer
- Dylan Murcott (born 1992), American sports car racing driver
- Dylan Murnane (born 1995), Australian footballer
- Dylan Murray (disambiguation), several people
- Dylan Nahi (born 1999), French handball player
- Dylan Naidoo (born 1998), South African professional golfer
- Dylan Nandín (born 2002), Uruguayan footballer
- Dylan Napa (born 1992), Australian rugby league footballer
- Dylan Naputi (born 1995), Guamanian international footballer
- Dylan Nathan, real name of Jega (musician), English electronic musician
- Dylan Neal (born 1969), Canadian actor
- Dylan Nealis (born 1998), American MLS player
- Dylan Nel (born 1992), South African rugby union player
- Dylan O'Brien (born 1991), American actor and musician
- Dylan O'Donnell, Australian IT entrepreneur and photographer
- Dylan O'Grady (born 1971), Irish former rugby union player who has also coached
- Dylan O'Keeffe (born 1998), Australian racing driver
- Dylan Olsen (born 1991), American- and Canadian former NHL player
- Dylan Orr (born 1979), American politician
- Dylan Osetkowski (born 1996), American-born German professional basketball player
- Dylan Ouédraogo (born 1998), French professional footballer
- Dylan Page (born 1982), American professional basketball player
- Dylan Page (cyclist) (born 1993), Swiss professional cyclist
- Dylan Parham (born 1999), American NFL player
- Dylan Parker (born 1999), English professional footballer
- Dylan Patterson (born 2007), Australian AFL player
- Dylan Patton (born 1992), American former actor and child model
- Dylan Peacock (born 2001), Gibraltarian association footballer
- Dylan Peraić-Cullen (born 2006), Australian professional soccer player
- Dylan Perceval-Maxwell, Canadian activist and businessman; candidate in the 2020 Green Party of Canada leadership election
- Dylan Pereira (born 1997), Portuguese-Luxembourgish racing driver
- Dylan Perera (born 2003), Spanish professional footballer
- Dylan Peterson (born 1990), South African professional rugby union player
- Dylan Phillips, Canadian member of indie rock band Half Moon Run
- Dylan Phythian (born 1995), Australian professional rugby league footballer
- Dylan Pierias (born 2000), Australian professional soccer player
- Dylan Pieterse (born 1995), South African rugby union player
- Dylan Pietsch (born 1998), Australian professional rugby union player
- Dylan Playfair (born 1992), Canadian actor
- Dylan Pledger (born 2005), New Zealand rugby union player
- Dylan Postl, real name of Hornswoggle (born 1986), American professional wrestler and YouTuber
- Dylan Presnell (born 1995), American former professional stock car racing driver
- Dylan Pugh, American politician
- Dylan Quick, American convicted criminal
- Dylan Ragland, real name of Party Favor, American DJ and EDM producer
- Dylan Ragolle (born 1994), Belgian footballer
- Dylan Raiola (born 2005), American college football player
- Dylan Ramsey, American-Canadian actor and film producer
- Dylan Ratigan (born 1972), American businessman, author, film producer, former host, and political commentator
- Dylan Ray (born 2001), American MLB pitcher
- Dylan Reese (born 1984), American former NHL-, KHL-, and SHL player
- Dylan Reid (born 2005), Scottish professional footballer
- Dylan Remick (born 1991), American MLS player
- Dylan Reznick, American past member of hip-hop producer duo Friendzone
- Dylan Rice (born 1976), American singer-songwriter and arts administrator
- Dylan Richardson (born 1999), Scottish international rugby union player
- Dylan Rieder (1988–2016), American professional skateboarder, artist, and model
- Dylan Riley (disambiguation), several people
- Dylan River (born 1992), Australian film director, writer, and cinematographer
- Dylan Rizk, American college football player
- Dylan Roberton (born 1991), Australian former AFL player
- Dylan Roberts (born 1989), American politician and attorney
- Dylan Robinson, Skwah First Nation-Canadian artist, curator, writer, and associate professor
- Dylan Rockoff (born 1994), American singer-songwriter
- Dylann Roof (born 1994), American perpetrator of the Charleston church shooting
- Dylan Rosiek (born 2002), American college football player
- Dylan Ross, American rapper and producer
- Dylan Ross (born 2000), American MLB pitcher
- Dylan Rourke, American actor
- Dylan Ruiz-Diaz (born 2001), Australian professional footballer
- Dylan Ryan (drummer) (born 1979), American drummer and composer
- Dylan Ryan (soccer) (born 2000), Australian professional soccer player
- Dylan Sacramento (born 1995), Canadian soccer player
- Dylan Sage (born 1992), South African rugby union player
- Dylan Saint-Louis (born 1995), French-born Republic of the Congo professional footballer
- Dylan Salvador (born 1993), French mixed martial artist and former Muay Thai kickboxer
- Dylan Samberg (born 1999), American NHL player
- Dylan Sampson (born 2004), American NFL player
- Dylan Scharf, American past member of hardcore punk band The Locust
- Dylan Schmidt (born 1997), New Zealand trampoline gymnast
- Dylan Schmorrow, American scientist and defense official
- Dylan Schneider (born 1999), American country music singer and songwriter
- Dylan Scicluna (born 2004), Australian footballer
- Dylan Scott (born 1990), American country music singer and songwriter
- Dylan Scott (footballer) (born 2005), English professional footballer
- Dylan Seys (born 1996), Belgian professional footballer
- Dylan She, alternate name of She Zhijiang (born c. 1982), Chinese Cambodian businessman
- Dylan Shiel (born 1993), Australian former AFL player
- Dylan Shipley, British director
- Dylan Sicobo (born 1997), Seychellois sprinter
- Dylan Sikura (born 1995), Canadian KHL player, and former NHL player
- Dylan Silva (born 1999), French-born Portuguese professional footballer
- Dylan Sinclair (born 2001), Canadian R&B singer-songwriter
- Dylan Sjoblom, South African rugby union footballer
- Dylan Skee (born 1986), Australian rugby league footballer
- Dylan Slepian (born 1995), American professional stock car racing driver
- Dylan Slevin (born 2002), Irish professional darts player
- Dylan Small, American statistician
- Dylan Smith (disambiguation), several people
- Dylan Soedjasa (born 1995), New Zealand badminton player
- Dylan Southern, English film director and writer
- Dylan Speerstra, Australian past member of Metanoia
- Dylan Sprayberry (born 1998), American actor
- Dylan Sprouse (born 1992), American actor
- Dylan Stadelmann (born 1989), Swiss professional footballer
- Dylan Stanley (born 1991), South African cricketer
- Dylan Steenbergen (born 1987), Canadian former CFL player
- Dylan Stephens (born 2001), Australian AFL player
- Dylan Stephenson (born 2002), English professional footballer
- Dylan Sterling, alternate name of Sun Delin (born 2001), American soccer player
- Dylan Stevenson (born 1997), Scottish professional footballer
- Dylan Stewart (born 2005), American college football player
- Dylan Strome (born 1997), Canadian NHL player
- Dylan Sullivan (born 2001), American MLSNP player
- Dylan Sunderland (born 1996), Australian professional racing cyclist
- Dylan Switters (born 2001), English footballer
- Dylan Tait (born 2001), Scottish professional footballer
- Dylan Taite (1937–2003), New Zealand rock music journalist
- Dylan Talero (born 2004), Colombian footballer
- Dylan Tavares (born 1996), Swiss professional footballer
- Dylan Taylor (disambiguation), several people
- Dylan Teuns (born 1992), Belgian professional road racing cyclist
- Dylan Teves (born 2000), American MLS player
- Dylan Thomas (disambiguation), several people
- Dylan Thompson (disambiguation), several people
- Dylan Thuras, American documentary filmmaker and author
- Dylan Tichenor (born 1968), American film editor
- Dylan Tierney-Martin (born 1999), Irish rugby union player
- Dylan Timber (born 2000), Dutch professional footballer
- Dylan Tippetts (born 2000), English politician
- Dylan Tombides (1994–2014), Australian professional footballer
- Dylan Travis (born 1993), American basketball player
- Dylan Tully, alternate name of Michael Lindsay (1963–2019), American voice actor
- Dylan Tuomy-Wilhoit, American actor
- Dylan Unsworth (born 1992), South African professional baseball pitcher
- Dylan Valley, South African filmmaker
- Dylan van Baarle (born 1992), Dutch professional road racing cyclist
- Dylan Vandenstorme (born 2002), Belgian cyclist
- Dylan Van Unen (born 1990), Australian AFL player
- Dylan Vanwelkenhuysen (born 1992), Belgian footballer
- Dylan Vente (born 1999), Dutch-born Surinamese professional footballer
- Dylan Verrechia (born 1976), French-born Danish film director, auteur, screenwriter, director of photography, and producer
- Dylan Volantis (born 2005), American college baseball pitcher
- Dylan Voller, Aboriginal-Australian activist and former youth criminal
- Dylan Walczyk (born 1993), American Olympic freestyle skier
- Dylan Waldron (born 1953), British artist
- Dylan Walker (born 1994), Australian professional rugby league footballer
- Dylan Walker, American member of grindcore band Full of Hell
- Dylan Walsh (born 1963), American actor
- Dylan Walsh (hurler) (born 1998), Irish hurler
- Dylan Walshe, Irish folk music singer-songwriter
- Dylan Wang (born 1998), Chinese actor and singer
- Dylan Ward, American suspect in the murder of Robert Eric Wone
- Dylan Ward (born 1993), American professional stock car racing driver
- Dylan Watts (born 1997), Irish footballer
- Dylan Wegela, American politician
- Dylan Wells (born 1998), Canadian NHL- and AHL player
- Dylan Wells (footballer) (born 2006), Scottish footballer
- Dylan Wendt (born 2001), American ECHL player
- Dylan Wenzel-Halls (born 1997), Australian professional soccer player
- Dylan Westbrook (born 1998), Canadian professional dirt track racing driver
- Dylan Wheeler, Australian member of hacker group Xbox Underground
- Dylan Wiggins (born 1995), American singer, songwriter, producer, and multi-instrumentalist
- Dylan Wight, Australian politician
- Dylan Wiliam, Welsh educationalist and emeritus professor
- Dylan Williams (disambiguation), several people
- Dylan Windler (born 1996), American NBL player
- Dylan Wissing, American drummer, percussionist, and composer
- Dylan Woodhead (born 1998), American water polo player
- Dylan Wotherspoon (born 1993), Australian international field hockey player
- Dylan Wright (singer), Australian contestant on Australian Idol season 9
- Dylan Wright (motorcyclist) (born 1997), Canadian professional Motocross racer
- Dylan Wruck (born 1992), German-Canadian professional ice hockey player
- Dylan Wu (born 1996), American professional golfer
- Dylan Wykes (born 1983), Canadian long-distance runner
- Dylan Wynn (born 1993), American CFL player, and former NFL- and AAF player
- Dylan Yeo (born 1986), Canadian professional ice hockey player
- Dylan Young (born 1989), Australian racing driver
- Dylan Yturralde, Filipino contestant on Pinoy Big Brother: Gen 11
- Dylan Zink (born 1992), American ice hockey executive and former professional player

=== Female ===
- Dylan (musician) (born 1999), English musician, singer, and songwriter
- Dylann Ceriani, American volleyball player
- Dylan Conrique (born 2004), American singer, songwriter, and actress
- Dylan Dreyer (born 1981), American television meteorologist
- Dylan Farrow (born 1985), American adopted daughter of actress Mia Farrow
- Dylan Gelula (born 1994), American actress
- Dylan Greenberg (born 1997), American film director and musician
- Dylan Holmes (born 1997), Australian professional footballer
- Dylan Hundley, American actress, singer, and visual artist
- Dylan Krieger (born 1990), American poet and writer
- Dylan Lauren (born 1974), American businesswoman; daughter of fashion designer Ralph Lauren, and owner of Dylan's Candy Bar
- Dylan Mulvaney (born 1996), American social media personality, actress, comedian, singer, and author
- Dylan Mira, alternate name of Na Mira (born 1982), American artist and educator
- Dylan Penn (born 1991), American model and actress; daughter of Sean Penn and Robin Wright
- Dylan Quercia (born 1985), American chess player- and coach, journalist, and filmmaker
- Dylan Ryan (born 1981), American pornographic actress
- Dylan Ryder (born 1981), American former pornographic film actress
- Dylan Sahara (1992–2018), Indonesian television actress and presenter

== People with the middle name ==
=== Male ===
- B. Dylan Hollis (born 1995), Bermudian-American social media personality and baker

=== Female ===
- Sky Dylan-Robbins (born 1989), American journalist, documentary producer, and media entrepreneur

== People with the surname ==
=== Male ===
- Bob Dylan (born 1941), American singer-songwriter, painter, and writer (born Robert Zimmerman)
- Jakob Dylan (born 1969), American singer-songwriter; lead singer of rock band The Wallflowers (son of Bob and Sara Dylan)
- Jesse Dylan (born 1966), American film director and production executive; eldest son of Bob Dylan and Sara Dylan
- Ray Dylan (born 1978), South African singer, songwriter, and producer
- Steve Dylan, Canadian comedian and television writer

=== Female ===
- Ellie Dylan (born 1952), American executive
- Sara Dylan (born 1939), American former actress and model; first wife of Bob Dylan
- Sarah X Dylan (born 1980), American Internet radio- and television host, and former radio producer and talk show co-host
- Whitney Dylan (born 1976), American actress

== Fictional characters ==
- Dylan, in the UK children's program The Magic Roundabout
- Dylan Briggs, in the US drama TV series Hunters, played by Mark Coles Smith
- Dylan Brock, in the US Marvel Comics
- Dylan Carter, in the Australian TV soap opera Home and Away, played by Jeremy Lindsay Taylor
- Dylan Christie, in the UK TV soap opera River City, played by Sean Connor
- Dylan Crandall, in the US medical drama TV series House, played by D. B. Sweeney
- Dylan Dog, in the Italian horror comic series of the same name, played by Brandon Routh in the 2011 US comedy horror film Dylan Dog: Dead of Night
- Dylan Dubrow, in the 1996 US science fiction action film Independence Day, played by Ross Bagley
- Dylan G., in the US science fiction psychological thriller TV series Severance, played by Zach Cherry
- Dylan Gould, in the 2011 US science fiction action film Transformers: Dark of the Moon, played by Patrick Dempsey
- Dylan Jenkins, in the UK soap opera Hollyoaks, played by James Fletcher
- Dylan Keogh, in the UK medical drama Casualty, played by William Beck
- Dylan Killington, in the US comedy-drama TV series Studio 60 on the Sunset Strip, played by Nate Torrence
- Dylan Lenivy, in the 2022 interactive drama horror game The Quarry, played by Miles Robbins
- Dylan Marshall, in the US TV sitcom Modern Family, played by Reid Ewing
- Dylan Marvil, in the young adult novel series The Clique
- Dylan Mayfair, in the US mystery comedy-drama TV series Desperate Housewives, played by Lyndsy Fonseca
- Dylan McAvoy, in the US TV soap opera The Young and the Restless, played by Steve Burton
- Dylan McKay, in the US teen drama TV series Beverly Hills 90210, played by Luke Perry
- Dylan Michalchuk, in the Canadian teen drama TV series Degrassi: The Next Generation
- Dylan Moody, in the US soap opera One Life to Live, played by Christopher Douglas
- Dylan Moreland, in the TV drama series The L Word, played by Alexandra Hedison
- Dylan Mulholland, in the Australian TV drama Sea Patrol, played by Conrad Coleby
- Dylan Parrish, in the Australian TV soap opera Home and Away, played by Jimmy Lucini, Jay Patterson, and Corey Glaister
- Dylan "Dil" Pickles, in the US animated TV series Rugrats and All Grown Up!, voiced by Tara Strong
- Dylan Reinhart, several characters
- Dylan Russell, in the Australian TV soap opera Home and Away, played by Brett Hicks-Maitland
- Dylan Timmins, in the Australian TV soap opera Neighbours, played by Damien Bodie
- Dylan Wilson, in the UK TV soap opera Coronation Street, played by Charlie Corry, Connor McCheyne, and Liam McCheyne
- Dylan Yuki, in the Japanese manga and anime series Mirmo!, voiced by Yukitoshi Tokumoto and Daisuke Namikawa

== Other uses ==
- See Dylan (disambiguation)
