= Dillon (given name) =

- Gender: Male
- Language: English

Origin
- Languages: English, Irish, Breton
- Origin: Dillon (surname)
- Region of origin: Ireland, Brittany

Other names
- Related names: Dylan

Dillon is a masculine given name.

== Notable people with the given name include ==
- Dillon Anderson (1906–1974), American politician
- Dillon Ashe (1666–1724), English archdeacon
- Dillon Barnes (born 1996), English footballer
- Dillon Bassett (born 1997), American stock car racing driver
- Dillon Bates (born 1988), American politician
- Dillon Battistini (born 1977), British racing driver
- Dillon Baxter (born 1991), American football player
- Dillon Bell (1822–1898), New Zealand politician
- Dillon Bell (American football) (born 2003), American football player
- Dillon Boucher (born 1975), New Zealand basketball player
- Dillon Brooks (born 1996), Canadian basketball player
- Dillon Burroughs (born 1976), American author
- Dillon Carew (born 1970), Guyanese boxer
- Dillon Carman (born 1986), Canadian professional boxer and reality television personality
- Dillon Carmichael, American singer
- Dillon Casey (born 1983), American-Canadian actor
- Dillon Day (born 1970), American pornographic actor
- Dillon Day (American football) (born 1991), American football player
- Dillon De Silva (born 2002), Sri Lankan footballer
- Dillon Douglas (born 1988), West Indian cricketer
- Dillon Dubé (born 1998), Canadian ice hockey player
- Dillon Dumont, American politician
- Dillon du Preez (born 1981), South African cricketer
- Dillon Farrell (born 1990), American football player
- Dillon Forte (born 1987), American tattoo artist
- Dillon Fournier (born 1994), Canadian ice hockey player
- Dillon Francis (born 1987), American disc jockey
- Dillon Freasier (born 1996), American actor
- Dillon Gabriel (born 2000), American football player
- Dillon Gee (born 1986), American baseball player
- Dillon Gordon (born 1993), American football player
- Dillon Guy (born 1991), American football player
- Dillon Head (born 2004), American baseball player
- Dillon Heatherington (born 1995), Canadian ice hockey player
- Dillon Heyliger (born 1989), Canadian cricketer
- Dillon Hunt (born 1995), New Zealand rugby union player
- Dillon Johnson (born 2001), American football player
- Dillon Jones (born 2001), American basketball player
- Dillon D. Jordan (born 1973), American film producer
- Dillon Lawson, American baseball coach
- Dillon Lewis (born 1996), Welsh rugby union player
- Dillon Maggard (born 1995), American runner
- Dillon Maples (born 1992), American baseball player
- Dillon Mitchell (basketball) (born 2003), American basketball player
- Dillon Mitchell (gridiron football) (born 1998), American football player
- Dillon S. Myer (1891–1982), American politician
- Dillon Naylor (born 1968), Australian cartoonist
- Dillon Overton (born 1991), American baseball pitcher
- Dillon Pennington (born 1999), English cricketer
- Dillon Peters (born 1992), American baseball player
- Dillon Phillips (born 1995), English footballer
- Dillon Powers (born 1991), American soccer player
- Dillon Quirke (1998–2022), Irish hurler
- Dillon Radunz (born 1998), American football player
- Dillon Ruml (born 1999), American racing driver
- Dillon Serna (born 1994), American soccer player
- Dillon Sheppard (born 1979), South African football player
- Dillon Simpson (born 1993), Canadian ice hockey player
- Dillon Smit (born 1992), South African rugby union footballer
- Dillon Steuer (born 2002), American racing driver
- Dillon Stevens (born 1997), American actor
- Dillon Stith (born 1992), American basketball player
- Dillon Stoner (born 1998), American football player
- Dillon Tate (born 1994), American baseball player
- Dillon Thieneman (born 2004), American football player
- Dillon Thomas (born 1992), American baseball player
- Dillon Wallace (1863–1939), American author
- Dillon Ward (born 1991), Canadian lacrosse player

== See also ==
- Dillon (disambiguation)
- Dillon (surname)
- Dylan (name), includes a list of people with the given name or surname
