= List of Happy Sundays Fest events and acts =

Music Festival

Happy Sundays Fest (AKA Happy Sundays FREE Music Fest, Anti-Music Festival) is a free music festival organized by Julia Kugel, Scott Montoya and Jess Giles that takes place annually in Long Beach, California. In 2024, Happy Sundays expanded to two days and expanded its scope to host aerospace talks.

Along with organizing the annual free festival, the Happy Sundays has collaborated with Long Beach Symphony, Michelin Star winner Heritage and acclaimed arranger and CalArts faculty Eyvind Kang for Psychedelic Symphony.

== Festival Lineups ==
=== 2017 ===
==== February 19, 2017 ====
Stage	Performers
Alex's Bar	Girl Tears • Dustin Lovelis • The Potential Lunatics • Bom Bon • Feels
From The Moon Vintage	The Natives • Black Noise • King Kang • Boa Constrictors • The Vespertines • Alicia Murphy Band • Toliver

==== May 7, 2017 ====
Stage	Performers
Alex's Bar	The Ghost Dance • The High Curbs • Meow Twins • Criminal Hygiene • Cheap Tissue • Plague Vendor
From The Moon Vintage	Kalyn Aolani • Te Adoro • The Tissues • The Potential Lunatics
Urban Americana	Quixote's Revolver • Space Waves • Cat Signs

==== August 26, 2018 ====
Stage	Performers
Alex's Bar	Space Parts for Broken Hearts • No Tides • Ramonda Hammer • Falkow • Yip Yops • Holy Wars • Dræmings • Death Valley Girls • The Shrine
Analog Records	Emma Cole • Leo James Conroy
DiPiazza's	Bundy • Emmitt James • Devil Season • Los Hurricanes • Caught a Ghost
Iguana Kelley's	China Rose • The Ghost Dance • The No. 44 • The Paranoyds • Audacity
Long Beach Playhouse (Comedy Stage)	Emery Becker Photo Art Show • Nick Thune • Jay Larsen • Vince Royale
Los Altos Plaza Park	Jelly of the Month Club • Rok Academy • Cosmic Reaction
Red Leprechaun	Easy Friend • Lucy & La Mer • Rudy De Anda • White Woods • Jake Snider (Minus The Bear)
Urban Americana	DCHAV • Earl Grey • Mind Monogram • Levitation Room • Spendtime Palace

==== August 25, 2019 ====
Stage	Performers
Alex's Bar	Slop Stomp • Big Monsta • Jordan Jones • Rats in The Louvre • Birth Defects • Kevin • Cat Scan • The Coathangers
Alex's Bar	Velvet Starlings • The Gems • Lily Waters • Triptides • Tropa Magica
Ashtanga Yoga Long Beach	Aceoteric & Future Past Lives • Very Crush • Koibito • THESTART
Bamboo Club	DJ Lili & DJ Desi • Eusebio Asaka & DJ Nativity
DiPiazza's	DJ Moonkill Radio • Suburban John • Jane Lane • Billy Changer • The Molochs
Iguana Kelley's	Wacko • Girl Tears • Slaughterhouse • Prettiest Eyes
Long Beach Playhouse (Comedy Stage)	Neil Hamburger • Megan Koester • Lizzy Cooperman • Kyle Kinane • Mikey Kampmann • Andrew Michann
Red Leprechaun	Sophie Strauss • TJ Ridings • White Woods • Sunny War
Supply & Demand	Karenn Campbell • Devil Season • Slice • Healing Gems

==== August 29, 2021 ====
Stage	Performers
Alex's Bar	DJ Moonkill Radio • Stormhouse • Litronix • Fahi'h • Black Hall • The Sleeperz • UGHH • Jagged Baptist Club • N8NOFACE
Alex's Bar	Jimmy Vincent • Christian Aguilar • Closed Tear • Danke • The Volclays
Bamboo Club	Slop Stomp • The Thingz • Icky & The Splooges • Boogie Mamas • Clown Sounds
Compound	The Portuguese Lover
DiPiazza's	Chapis • Widows Gold • Velvet Starlings • Pop Club • Belted Sweater • Trap Girl • Bundy • Spirit Mother
Tennessee Jack's	Adult Books • Sweet Nobody • She Wears Black • Soul Flow • MoonFuzz • Dream Phases

==== August 28, 2022 ====
Stage	Performers
Alex's Bar	DJ Unholy • Solancy • Vox Humana • UGHH • Furcast • DJ Dennis Owens • Julez & The Rollerz • Trap Girl • Shamon Cassette + Z.Z.Z.
Ashtanga Yoga Long Beach	Gongstravaganza w/ Oracle Gong
Bamboo Club	Psyched! Radio DJ's La Marcha Tropical & Little Gris • Wyld Gooms • Cuspidors • DJ Linda Nuves • Lost Cat • Bolero! • Tropa Magica • DJ Lili Bird
All Time Plants	Pageants • It's Butter • Date Nite • Smooth Jas • Nanna B.
Compound	Bearspring Singers • DJ Telegram Sam • Family Art Workshop
DiPiazza's	Siam Gem • Koka • VTB • Young Winona • Broken Baby • Jagged Baptist Club
Long Beach Playhouse	A Special Screening of Queercore: How To Punk a Revolution - A Film by Yony Leyser • THEMOUTH.tv Immersive Experience with visuals by Mad Alchemist
Port City Tavern	Nadu • Flatwaves • Buckets • Taleen Kali • Bastidas! • Carsex
Roland Sands Design	Sun Jelly • Hair • The McCharmlys
Supply & Demand	El Feeling • Kovekat • Nowandformerly • Moonily • Black Hall • Wisteria • Dark Disco Takeover • Chase Petra • Visuals by Moirebender
Tennessee Jack's	Pacific Sunsets • She Wear Black • The Gravities • Nebulaz Beach • The Merry Rounders • Julia, Julia
Tacos Le Revancha	Mariachi Octavo

==== August 27,2023 ====
Stage	Performers
Bamboo Club (Suicide Squeeze Records Stage)	Tremours • Pearl Earl • Julia, Julia • The Paranoyds • The Shivas • L.A. Witch • DJ Red Baron • UGHH • Bushfire • Guantanamo Baywatch
Bar Envie	Goodbye Ranger • Gold Shimmer • Norman Woods • Dabble • Apollo Bebop • DJ Little Son
Good Time	Jacob Sorenson • Adron • Dennis Robichaeu • Cult Baby • Pardon Me Sir • Al Bert
Long Beach Playhouse (Comedy Stage)	Carmen Christopher • Shane Torres
Port City Tavern	Bonus Land • Balance Riot • The Killing Floors • NÜTT • Scott Yoder • Soft Palms • Nectarines • Unholy DJ • Wave Wizard DJ • Freedom Curse • Terminal A • Black Hall • Visuals by Moirebender
Supply & Demand	The Frick Frakcs • Hoopjail • Chorus Pedal • Jon Boell Band • Zodiac Rippers • Birth Defects

=== 2024 ===
==== Saturday, August 24 ====
Stage	Performers
Alex's Bar	DJ Lonely Creeper • Decent Times • Breatherrr • Auxilio • Power Flex 5 • Sweat • Robber • NÜTT • NIIS • DJ Dennis Owens
Space Talks at the Long Bach Art Theatre	Jason Achilles - Rovers, Rockets & Rock n' Roll • Jeff Megivern - Rocket Scientist at NASA JPL - Gaming in the Space Age • Bobby Van Ness - Spacecraft Robotics Engineer - Space Robots
Bamboo Club	J Mau & The Sneaky Boys • Icky & The Splooges • M.O.T.O. • Mike Watt + The Missingmen • Clown Sounds • Self Improvement • Fartbarf
Compound	Art For Kids • Asi Fui • Rose Haze • George Sarah Ensemble • Cassowary • Zzzahara
Fear City Tattoo	Tattoo Heritage Project Popup Flash Event
Port City Tavern	Bonus Land • Mad Menace & The Murder Dogs • Blanco Niño • Holy Cuts • Hex Code • Gazoota • Dream Phases

==== Sunday, August 25 ====
Stage	Performers
Bamboo Club	The Sleeperz • Egg Drop Soup • Jagged Baptist Club • Buzzed Lightbeer • Soft Palms • Shamon Cassette • Sego
Compound	Art For All • Long Beach Symphony Instrument Petting Zoo • Adam Topol & Matt Costa • Laena Myers • Jennie Cotterill • Jason Achilles • Mo0d
Fear City Tattoo	Tattoo Heritage Project Popup Flash Event
Long Beach Playhouse (Comedy Stage)	Nina Nguyen • Willie Macc • Moses Storm • Andrei Bailey • Courtney Haynes • CP
Port City Tavern	Unguarded • Golden Ram • Soundfrom • Sharpie Smile • Pop Hysteria • Furcast • DJ Marlon X
