= On Our Own Island =

- Directed by: Ellie Dylan Sky Dylan-Robbins
- Produced by: Ellie Dylan
- Starring: Ellie Dylan Steven Robbins Sky Dylan-Robbins
- Cinematography: Sky Dylan-Robbins
- Edited by: Michael Levine Ellie Dylan
- Music by: Dominique Charpentier
- Production company: Wingspan Media Partners
- Release dates: June 16, 2021 (Sedona); February 15, 2023 (US)
- Running time: 82 Mins
- Country: United States
- Language: English

On Our Own Island is a 2021 American documentary film, co-directed by Ellie Dylan and Sky Dylan-Robbins. The film is a timeless true love story that chronicles the seasons of a relationship from its romantic beginnings through life’s final moments. The film premiered at the 2021 Sedona International Film Festival, where it won the Audience Award for Best Documentary Feature. It went on to win numerous awards and screen at film festivals across the United States and around the world.

== Synopsis ==
This “vivid, lyrical, and loving” documentary, directed by mother-daughter filmmakers Ellie Dylan and Sky Dylan-Robbins, presents a heartwarming tale about the enduring power of true love. When a terminal diagnosis for Steven Robbins (their husband and father) upends their lives, the family decides to film its journey. For two years, they “unflinchingly” follow Robbins as he goes from complete health to, and through, a peaceful death at home. Intertwined in the film is Dylan and Robbins’ decades-long romance that rivals a Hollywood love story — which includes hundreds of love letters that Robbins wrote to Dylan throughout their relationship.

== Development & Production ==
The filmmakers were equipped to support Robbins along his journey, and used their decades of media experience and journalistic skills to tell this story. The themes explored in this documentary also tie into previous experiences of the filmmakers: Dylan conducted her senior thesis at Tulane University on death over 40 years before, with the belief that death was not the end, but rather a transition. Meanwhile, at the start of the film’s production, Dylan-Robbins had just completed a short documentary about birth, the beginning of life, as a journalist at The New Yorker magazine.

However, the genesis of the film began decades earlier when Dylan and Robbins first met on a deserted beach in Malibu, California. Years later, after Robbins’ diagnosis, the family began searching for ways to heal him. With his death looming, the family’s focus shifted to finding ways to make his end-of-life experience peaceful and consistent with the values they embraced. Astonished when their search came up empty, the family decided to film its journey so others could benefit from the answers they were determined to find.

In 2020, in the film’s final stages and after six years in production, Dylan discovered boxes of love letters from Robbins to her in the attic of their home. The final title of the film had been evolving over its years in production. With the discovery of these letters, it became obvious to the filmmakers that there was only one title the film should have. In his final letter to Dylan, as well as in other previous letters he wrote to her over the years, Robbins referred to their time together as being “on our own island,” reflecting the romance and the beach theme that began with their first encounter.

On Our Own Island is a film about both love and death. Reviewers and audiences alike have lauded the film’s honesty, grace, and much-needed mission "to ignite a quiet revolution by empowering people everywhere to take back control of their end-of-life experience and “recognize that death and love intersect…mitigating society’s fear of death, and at the same time, supporting the idea that unconditional love is the most important thing of all.

== Cast ==
- Ellie Dylan
- Steven Robbins
- Sky Dylan-Robbins

== Film Festivals & Awards ==
Year	Festival	Awards
2021	Sedona International Film Festival	Audience Choice & Independent Spirit Awards, Best Documentary
2021	Heartland International Film Festival	
2021	Maui Film Festival	
2023	Bahamas International Film Festival	Spirit of Freedom Award
2021	Spirit International Film Festival	
2020	Santa Monica Film Festival	
2021	Malibu Film Festival	
2021	Buffalo International Film Festival	
2021	Manhattan Film Festival	Film Heals Award, Best Documentary
2020	Anchorage International Film Festival	Jury Award, Best Documentary
2022	Victoria Film Festival	
2021	NewFilmmakers New York	
2021	Vail Film Festival	
2021	Kansas City FilmFest International	
2021	Rhode Island International Film Festival	Semi-Finalist, Documentary
2021	Switzerland International Film Festival	

== Links ==
- Official Website
- IMDB
