= Swing State (film) =

- Poster
- Directed by: Jonathan Sheldon
- Written by: Jonathan Sheldon
- Produced by: Jonathan Sheldon; Douglas Magallon; Diego Espana; Adam Falkoff; Arthur L. Bernstein; Kenneth Prieto; Dillon D. Jordan
- Starring: Alex Beh; Taryn Manning; Billy Zane; Sean Astin; Angela Kinsey
- Cinematography: Alan Marino
- Edited by: Alan Marino; Kenneth Prieto
- Music by: Aleks de Carvalho
- Distributed by: The Orchard
- Release date: November 1, 2016
- Running time: 89 minutes
- Country: United States
- Language: English

Swing State is a 2016 American comedy film written and directed by Jonathan Sheldon and starring Alex Beh, Taryn Manning, Billy Zane, Sean Astin, Arthur L. Bernstein, and Angela Kinsey.

== Plot ==
DJ Ethan Smith (Alex Beh), host of a Seattle-based public music radio program, takes over a conservative talk show and creates a fictional Republican persona, Charles Fern. When his fictional persona is a huge hit with listeners, unaware he is parodying conservative political pundits, he continues the ruse and becomes nationally famous, while in his personal life he experiences a series of misadventures.

== Cast ==
- Alex Beh as Ethan Smith
- Taryn Manning as Adrienne Lockhart
- Angela Kinsey as Susan Davis
- Sean Astin as Bob Bernard
- Billy Zane as Governor Richard Sollow
- Arthur L. Bernstein as Radio Dad
- Elaine Hendrix as Ann Alcott
- Nick Loeb as Peter Dennon
- Shane Black as Luke
- Ted Levine as Rouge Holmes
- Jake Busey as Woody Woodrow
- Lydia Hearst as Julia Davis
- Lorraine Ziff as Mary Sue

== Release ==
The film was released on iTunes on November 1, 2016.

== Reception ==
Simi Horowitz of Film Journal International gave the film a positive review and wrote, "Nonetheless, Swing State generally scores, and if it’s any indication, Sheldon’s next film should prove winning."
