= Schwadron =

Schwadron is a surname. Notable people with the surname include:

- Adam Schwadron, American politician
- Avraham Schwadron
- Ernst Schwadron, Austrian architect and interior designer
- Harley Schwadron, American cartoonist
- Joshua Schwadron (born 1981), American lawyer and entrepreneur
- Sholom Mordechai Schwadron (1835–1911), rabbi
- Sholom Schwadron (1912–1997), rabbi and orator
