= Joshua Schwadron =

American lawyer

- Born: Joshua Steven Schwadron; December 23, 1981 (age 44)
- Education: University of Michigan (BA, MA); Emory University (JD)
- Occupations: Lawyer, Business Executive

Joshua Steven Schwadron (born December 23, 1981) is an American lawyer and Internet entrepreneur. He is the CEO and co-founder of Mighty, a legal technology company.

== Early life and education ==
Schwadron attended the University of Michigan where in 2003 he was featured in a publication of GQ magazine where it honored him as its national college "Big Man on Campus." The same year, Joshua appeared on the NBC reality TV show "Fear Factor" where he won the two-episode Las Vegas special. After graduating from the Ross School of Business at U of M, Schwadron went on to pursue a career in law, graduating from the Emory University School of Law.

== Career ==
Schwadron is the CEO and co-founder of Mighty, a legal technology company that generates leads for personal injury lawyers. He co-founded the company with Dylan Beynon, who would later create Mindbloom.

Previously, he was the founder and CEO of Betterfly, a B2C service provider marketplace. Betterfly raised $4M in venture capital from Lightbank with Eric Lefkofsky and Brad Keywell, co-founders of Groupon, becoming members of the board. Betterfly was sold to TakeLessons in 2013.
