= Skyshapers Foundation =

Public charity

- Type: 501(c)(3) Non-Profit Organization
- Founded: New York City, U.S., August 1998
- Headquarters: 105 Chambers Street, New York City, NY, U.S.
- Founder: Ellie Dylan
- Industry: Supplemental curriculum, academic achievement and motivation
- Web Site: http://www.skyu.tv

The 501(c)(3) Skyshapers Foundation (dba Skyshapers University) is a public charity established in August 1988, which provides scholarships, materials and services to children, parents, schools and other non-profit organizations. With funding and distribution from the US government, Skyshapers University has to date provided more than 20 percent of public elementary schools in the United States with Skyshapers supplemental curriculum to boost academic achievement and motivation. First endorsed by the U.S. Surgeon General, Dr. Antonia Novello in 1992, Skyshapers materials have been used in more than 10,000 elementary schools reaching over 7.5 million children and their teachers across America.

In partnership with The Department of Health and Human Services, other government agencies and corporate sponsors, The Skyshapers Foundation developed and executed one of the largest outreach programs ever conducted by the Public Health Service in American schools.

An approved vendor of the NYC Department of Education for Textbooks and Teachers' Editions, Skyshapers University developed and is spearheading The SKY U Quest For Excellence Tour initiative in New York City schools.

== SKY U, LLC. ==
Sky U, LLC is the multi-media production company established in February 2003, which produces Skyshapers University programs, materials, and events. In 2005, Sky U produced, distributed, and implemented The Sky U Quest For Excellence initiative in New York City schools, a series of six, live two-hour multi-media events with thousands of school children and their teachers. The host and producer of these events is Ellie Dylan.
