= Dylan Riley =

Dylan Riley may be:

- Dylan John Riley (born 1971), American professor of sociology
- Dylan Riley (American football) (born 2006), American football player
- Dylan Riley (rugby union) (born 1997), South African-born Australian-Japanese professional rugby union player
- Dylan Riley Snyder (born 1997), American actor, singer, dancer, filmmaker, and Twitch streamer
