= Dylan Krieger =

American poet and writer

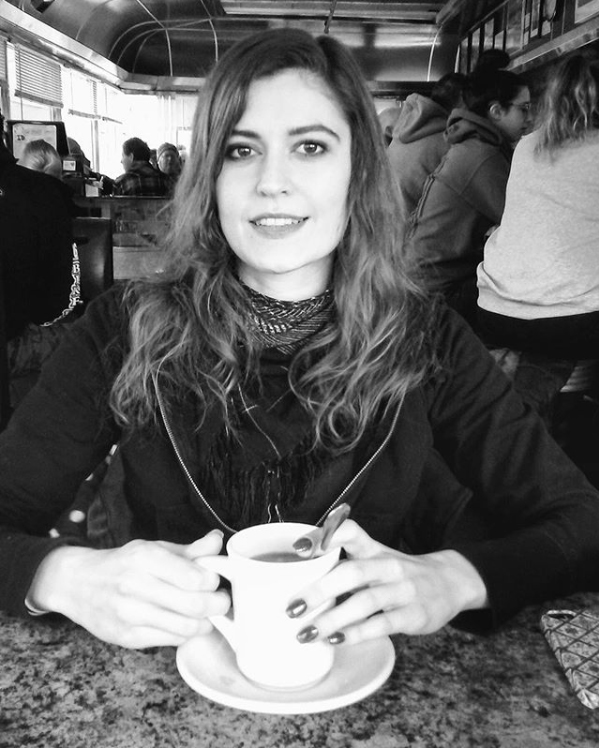
- Dylan Krieger at a diner in Albany, New York.
- Born: March 6, 1990 (age 36); South Bend, Indiana, U.S.
- Occupations: Poet, Editor
- Writing career
- Notable works: Giving Godhead (2017) dreamland trash (2018); No Ledge Left to Love (2018); The Mother Wart (2019); Metamortuary (2020); Soft-Focus Slaughterhouse (2021); Predators Welcome (2024); No One is Daddy (2026)

Dylan Krieger (born 6 March 1990) is an American poet and writer who has authored the books Giving Godhead, dreamland trash, No Ledge Left to Love, The Mother Wart, Metamortuary, Soft-Focus Slaughterhouse, Predators Welcome, and No One is Daddy. Her work has also appeared in numerous journals, including Nine Mile, Entropy, New Delta Review, (b)oink, Fine Print, Seneca Review, Jacket2, Five: 2: One, and others.

== Early life ==
Born in South Bend, Indiana, Krieger is the granddaughter of American historian Leonard Krieger, and the great-niece of Murray Krieger, an American literary critic and theorist. She was home-schooled by her mother for religious reasons and gave her first reading at age 16 after winning a contest. She attended the University of Notre Dame, where she earned a B.A. in English and philosophy in 2012 before moving to Baton Rouge, Louisiana, to earn her M.F.A. in creative writing at Louisiana State University. There, she studied under Lara Glenum and Laura Mullen and won the Robert Penn Warren MFA Thesis Award in 2015. That same year, she directed the Delta Mouth Literary Festival in Baton Rouge, Louisiana.

== Publications and appearances ==
In 2017, Delete Press published Krieger's first collection of poetry, Giving Godhead, which was dubbed the best collection of poetry to appear in English that year by The New York Times, as well as making their list of 100 notable books of the year. Also in 2017, she was a Susan K. Collins/Mississippi Valley Poetry Chapbook Contest finalist, was nominated for a Pushcart Prize for her poem "Fake Barns" by the Midwest Review, and her book No Ledge Left to Love won the annual book contest of the Henry Miller Memorial Library and was published by their imprint Ping Pong Free Press the following year. In 2018, she appeared on the podcast No Good Poetry, and was honored at the Louisiana Book Festival where she gave a reading at the state capitol. In 2019, she appeared on the panel "Apocalypse Lovers: Co-Conceiving Our Own Demise" at the New Orleans Poetry Festival, appeared on a panel presented by Louisiana Poet Laureate John Warner Smith at the Louisiana Book Festival, became the managing editor of the independent literary and visual arts journal Fine Print, and a full-length study of her first four books entitled Obscenity and Disruption in the Poetry of Dylan Krieger was published by Peter Lang. In 2020, she released a phonograph record of her reading six new poems entitled Turn into the Water via Fine Print Press.

== Poetry collections ==
- No One is Daddy, Saturnalia Books, 2026, ISBN 978-1947817944
- Predators Welcome, Limit Zero, 2024, ISBN 978-1-938753-48-0
- Hideous Compass, Underground Books, 2022, Chapbook
- Soft-Focus Slaughterhouse, 11:11 Press, 2021, ISBN 978-1948687263
- Metamortuary, Nine Mile Books, 2020, ISBN 978-1-7326600-5-2
- The Mother Wart, Vegetarian Alcoholic Press, 2019, ISBN 978-1-7326827-9-5
- No Ledge Left to Love, Ping Pong Free Press, 2018, ISBN 978-0-9973795-3-2
- dreamland trash, Saint Julian Press, 2018, ISBN 978-0-9986404-4-0
- Giving Godhead, Delete Press, 2017, ISBN 978-0-692-82351-4

== Recordings ==
- Turn into the Water, Fine Print Press, 2020, 7" record
