= Dylan Williams =

Dylan Williams may refer to:

- Dylan Holmes Williams (born 1992), British film director and screenwriter
- Dylan Williams (Australian footballer) (born 2001), Australian footballer
- Dylan Williams (footballer, born 2003), English footballer
