= Dylan Taylor =

Dylan Taylor may refer to:

- Dylan Taylor (actor) (born 1981), Canadian actor
- Dylan Taylor (executive) (born 1970), American business executive and philanthropist
- Dylan Taylor (bassist) (born 1960), American bassist
