= Dylan O'Donnell =

Australian astrophotographer, web developer and science communicator

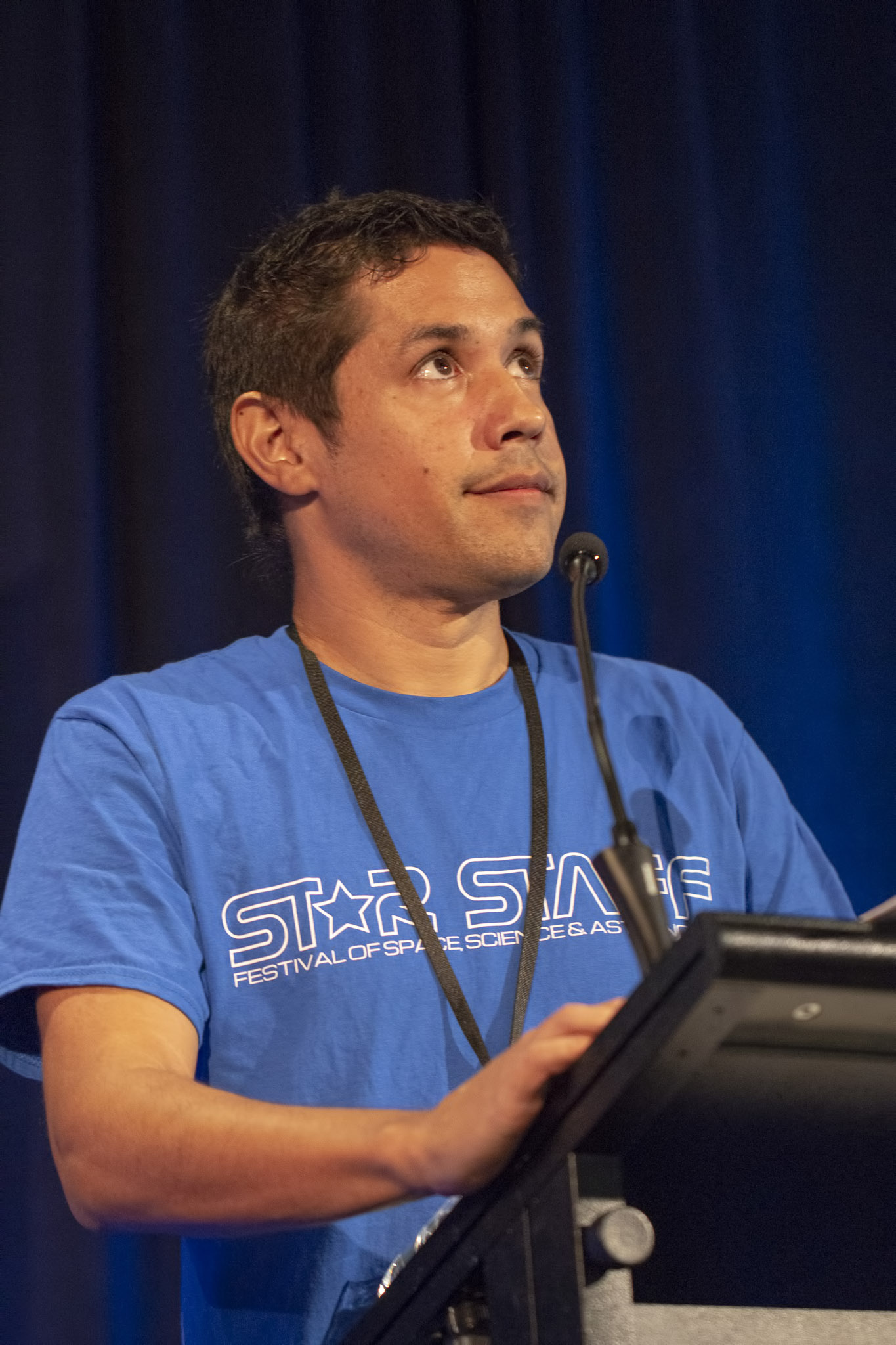
- O'Donnell at Star Stuff festival in 2018
- Education: Charles Sturt University (BSIT, MSIT); Swinburne University of Technology (Swinburne Astronomy Online)
- Years active: 2001-present
- Known for: Astrophotography
- Website: http://deography.com

Dylan O'Donnell is an Australian IT entrepreneur and amateur photographer, whose astrophotography has been featured by the European Space Agency (ESA), and NASA. His work has been selected twice for NASA's Astronomy Picture of the Day (APOD).

== Early life and education ==
O'Donnell grew up in Sydney, Melbourne, and Perth. He currently lives in Byron Bay. He has a bachelor's and a master's degree in information technology from Charles Sturt University. As part of his second degree, he developed an iPhone piano tutorial application which came out in the App Store in 2008. In 2019, O'Donnell graduated from Swinburne Astronomy Online (SAO).

== Astrophotography career ==
After visiting the Kennedy Space Center, O'Donnell, already a hobby photographer, became interested in astronomy. He bought a telescope and took up astrophotography. His photos have been published several times on the websites of NASA and the ESA.

Having set up an observatory behind his house in Byron Bay, O'Donnell began submitting his astrophotographs to a variety of websites, with some being published by NASA, ESA, Time, and National Geographic. He photographed Comet 252P/LINEAR passing through the Large Magellanic Cloud; it was published on the main page of National Geographic's website on March 21, 2016.

In April 2019, he took part in the U.S. Northeast Astronomy Forum in New York as a featured speaker.

== Projects ==
=== Star Stuff festival ===
O'Donnell is the founder of the annual Star Stuff festival of space, science and astronomy, which took place in Byron Bay in 2017 and 2018. The festival promoted the preservation of dark skies from light pollution and other electronic interference. He made a proposal to his community, which resulted in plans for the festival. Further iterations of the festival have not been announced.

The festival's initial investment was provided by his webhosting service, DNA Digital, as well as the telescope manufacturers Celestron and Bintel. Its participants included some of Australia's leading scientists, including astrophysicists and astrophotographers. Space Stuff took place again in 2018; sponsors included Celestron, the European Space Agency, Bintel, Cosmos Magazine, and Sidereal Trading.

=== Astronomy Picture of the Day ===
O'Donnell has been awarded with the Astronomy Picture of the Day (APOD) by NASA twice. The first was published on the APOD website on March 20, 2015, entitled "Sunshine, Earthshine". "Earth Shine" depicts the moon 14 hours after perigee, the point where the moon is closest to the earth. The second, published on July 31, 2015, titled "The ISS and a Colorful Moon", captured the ISS transiting across the moon.

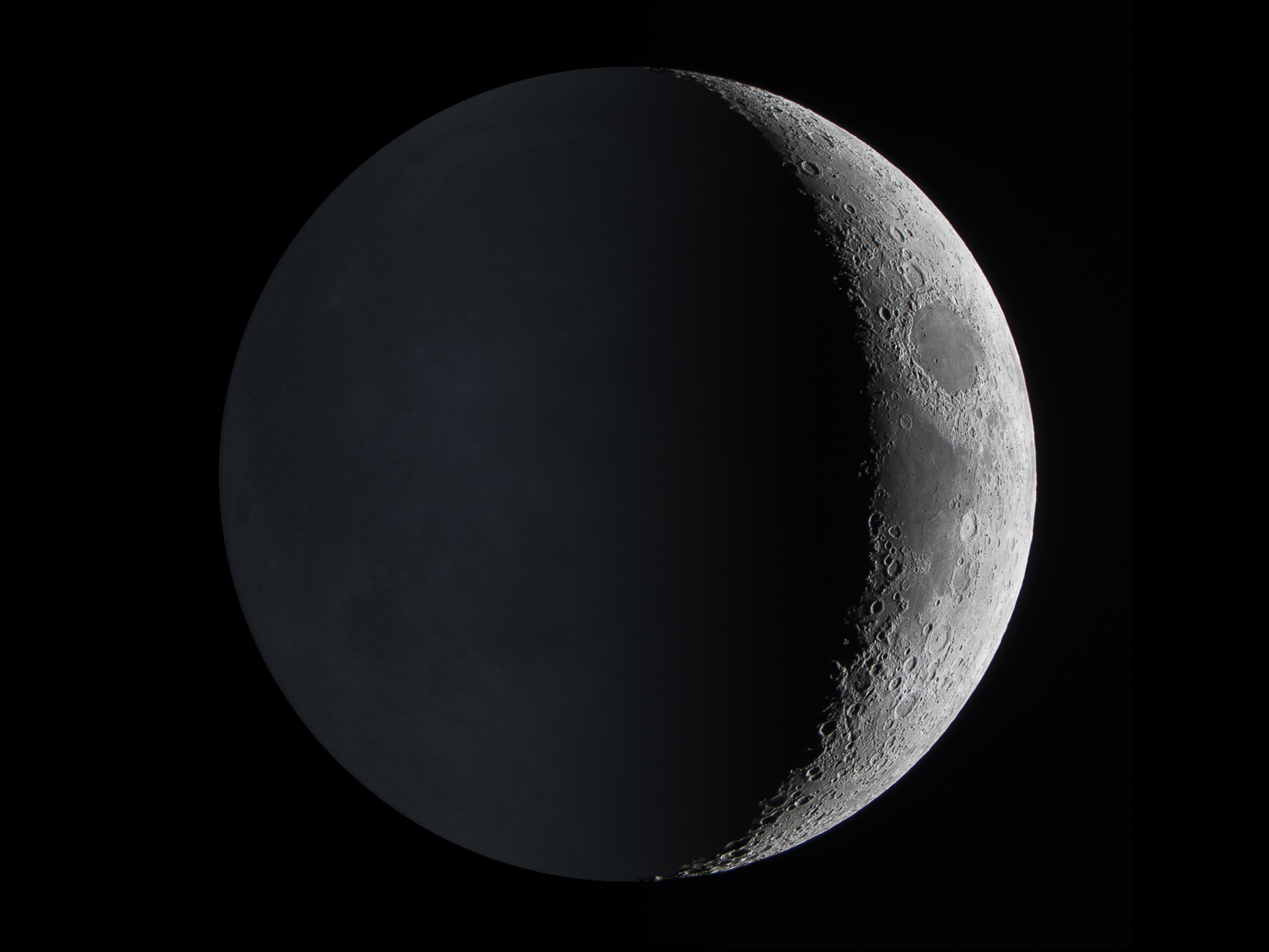
"Earth Shine" is a picture of the moon 14 hours after perigee. It shows both the day and the night in the same picture. It was published on March 20, 2015

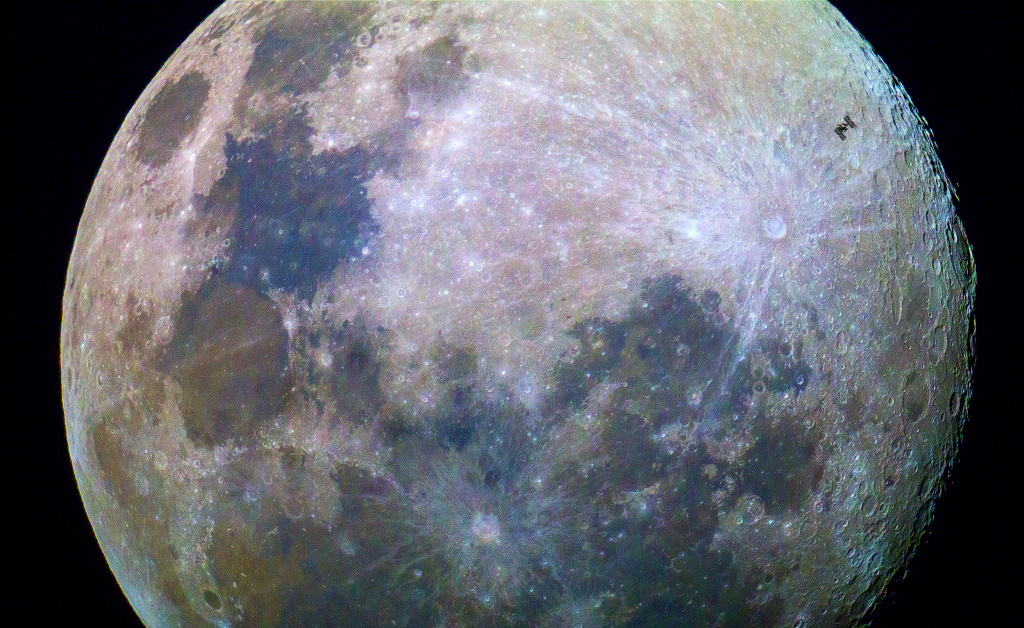
The ISS (International Space Station) transiting across the moon. It represents the second full moon of July 2015 and shows rare colors of the moon that emerge before it transforms into a full moon. It was published on July 31, 2015

== Awards ==
- 2015: Member of the Year from the Southern Astronomical Society.
- 2016: Honourable Mention, David Malin Awards.
- 2017: Member of the Year from the Southern Astronomical Society.
- 2017: Achievement Award from the Queensland Astronomical Societies.
- 2018: Editors Pick in the Solar System Category, David Malin Awards.

== See also ==
- Amateur astronomy
- Amateur astrophotography
- Observatory
- Space Station
- Telescope
