= Dylan Ferguson =

Dylan Ferguson may refer to:

- Dylan Ferguson (skier) (born 1988), American freestyle skier
- Dylan Ferguson (ice hockey) (born 1998), Canadian hockey player
