= Dylan Mingo =

American basketball player

No. 5 – Baylor Bears
- Position: Point guard / shooting guard
- Conference: Big 12 Conference

Personal information
- Born: October 6, 2008 (age 17)
- Listed height: 6 ft 5 in (1.96 m)
- Listed weight: 185 lb (84 kg)

Career information
- High school: Long Island Lutheran (Brookville, New York)
- College: Baylor (2026–present)

Dylan Mingo (born October 6, 2008) is an American college basketball player for the Baylor Bears of the Big 12 Conference. He is a five-star prospect and one of the top recruits in the class of 2026.

On February 17, 2026, Mingo committed to play college basketball for the North Carolina Tar Heels, but decommitted on April 13, after the firing of head coach Hubert Davis.

== Early life ==
Mingo is from Farmingdale, New York. He has two brothers, Dalique and Kayden, both of whom played basketball; Mingo was teammates with Kayden growing up and in high school. In eighth grade, Mingo played for the basketball team at Farmingdale High School, averaging 13.8 points. He then attended, with his brother, Long Island High School in Brookville, New York, being a four-year member of the varsity team. He averaged 6.4 points as a sophomore.

As a junior, Mingo averaged 14.1 points, 5.3 rebounds, 3.3 assists, and 2.1 steals per game while helping Long Island to a record of 22–7, earning selection to the MaxPreps Junior All-American third-team. In 2025, he was named MVP of the NBPA Top 100 Camp. He also played for the PSA Cardinals of the Nike Elite Youth Basketball League (EYBL), averaging 19.3 points, 7.8 rebounds, 2.6 assists, and 2.3 steals.

A consensus five-star recruit, Mingo is ranked one of the top-10 prospects in the class of 2026. He is also the top-ranked recruit in New York.
