= Dylan Moss =

English rugby union player

- Full name: Dylan Moss
- Born: 8 September 1998 (age 28) Milton Keynes, Buckinghamshire, England
- Height: 6 ft 1 in (1.85 m)
- Weight: 14 st 13 lb (95 kg)
- School: Wellington College
- University: Swansea University

Rugby union career
- Position: Wing
Senior career
Years	Team	Apps	(Points)
2018–2020	Ospreys	1	(0)

Dylan Moss is a Welsh rugby union player who played for Ospreys as a winger.

Moss made his debut for the Ospreys in 2018 against Zebre having previously played for the Ospreys academy and Bridgend Ravens.
