= Dylan Jones (physicist) =

American physicist and atmospheric scientist

- Education: Harvard University
- Scientific career
- Fields: Atmospheric physics
- Workplaces: University of Toronto

Dylan Jones is a professor of physics and atmospheric scientist at the University of Toronto.

== Education and Research ==
Jones received his undergraduate degree from Harvard University in 1990, a Masters in Applied Physics from Harvard in 1994, and a PhD in Earth and Planetary Sciences from Harvard in 1998. Jones' research is focused on integrating measurements of atmospheric composition with global three-dimensional models of chemistry and transport to develop a better understanding of how pollution influences the chemical and dynamical state of the atmosphere.

== Career ==
Jones was a researcher in the Division of Engineering and Applied Sciences at Harvard University from 1998 to 2004, whereupon he took up a faculty position in the Department of Physics at the University of Toronto. He was promoted to full professor in 2016.
