= Dylan Holmes (disambiguation) =

Dylan Holmes is an Australian female soccer player.

Dylan Holmes may also refer to:

- Dylan Holmes (actor) in Nothing Trivial
- Dylan Holmes, one of the Modern Family characters
- Dylan Holmes Williams (born 1992), British film director and screenwriter
