= Dylan Reinhart =

Dylan Reinhart may refer to:

- Dylan Denlon, in the 2006 US horror film Saw III, played by Stefan Georgiou
- Dylan Reinhart, in the New Zealand soap opera Shortland Street, played by Ryan O'Kane
- Dylan Reinhart, in the 2018 US police procedural drama TV series Instinct, played by Alan Cumming
