= Dylan Rice =

American singer

Dylan Rice (born 1976) is an American, San Francisco-based singer-songwriter and arts administrator, who grew up in Salt Lake City, Utah, United States. In May 2007 his song "The Lie" was included in the Columbia Records compilation Music with a Twist: Revolutions, along with The Gossip, Sarah Bettens (K's Choice), and Ivri Lider. His debut album, Wandering Eyes, was produced by former Acme engineer Blaise Barton (Bob Dylan, Liz Phair). Styx bassist Chuck Panozzo collaborated with Rice on a demo tape in 2002.

== Career ==
Rice spent his early career in Chicago performing at coffeehouses, clubs and street festivals with different acts. He has done musical collaborations with John Stirratt of Wilco, Grazyna Auguscik, Julie Wolf, and Johnny Iguana of the Claudettes. He has opened for Paula Cole, Shelby Lynne, Maps & Atlases, Garrison Starr, Alice Peacock, and Sarah Bettens of K's Choice. Also a published poet, he was included in the American Academy of Poets' New Voices Anthology (ed. Heather McHugh). He attended Northwestern University in Evanston, Illinois, where he received a BA in English and poetry writing.

His songs have received airplay on Sirius XM, Newsweek.com, Out.com, as well as in commercial radio markets in New York (WPLJ), Chicago (93 XRT, WCKG), Los Angeles (Star 98.7), San Francisco (Alice 97.3), Atlanta (Q100.5), Washington DC (Hot 99.5), Seattle (Kiss 106.1), and Houston (Mix 96.5), among others.

In July 2006, Rice, who is openly gay, performed his stadium-rock anthem "The Faces of Victory" for 20,000 people at the Gay Games Closing Ceremonies at Wrigley Field in Chicago, joined onstage by Styx bassist Chuck Panozzo, and backed by a chorus of Chicago LGBTQ rockers. Written especially for the Gay Games, the song was also recorded in the studio with Panozzo, released as a single, and was highlighted in the official Gay Games VII commemorative DVD in December 2006.

Critics have described his voice as "like Chris Isaak via Morrissey", and Rice himself has described his music as "folk-rock crooning" or "torch-song rock".

In 2010, Rice released the album, Electric Grids and Concrete Towers, recorded by Blaise Barton at Joyride Studios in Chicago. John Stirratt of Wilco played bass on Rice's track "Motel Daughters" from the album. The New Yorker illustrator Tom Bachtell designed the art work for Electric Grids and Concrete Towers.

From September 2012 to July 2016, Rice directed the City of Chicago’s music industry program at the Chicago Department of Cultural Affairs and Special Events. He collaborated with many of the nation's leading music industry leaders and celebrities on industry promotion and education initiatives including Chance the Rapper, Common, Seymour Stein, Jimmy Chamberlain, and Martin Atkins.

From 2013 to 2015, Rice was lead singer of the Chicago synth-rock band Software Giant. The band released We Are Overcome in 2015. Their song, "The Collider," appeared in the short film I Love You, Dad (directed by Eric Normington), which screened at the 2015 Cannes Film Festival.

Rice released the album, Fits and Fevers, in late 2019. Recorded by Adam Munoz, the album was one of the last projects to record at Fantasy Studios in Berkeley, California, before it closed its doors.

Since July 2016, Rice has been working as a Project and Communications Manager at the City and County of San Francisco Entertainment Commission.

On October 8, 2024, Rice spoke on behalf of the San Francisco Entertainment Commission at The White House as a part of the Office of National Drug Control Policy's White House Challenge to Save Lives from Overdose Event. The event recognized a number of organizations and businesses from around the country, including the San Francisco Entertainment Commission and its partnership with the SF Department of Public Health and the local drag community to prevent overdoses from fentanyl at nightlife spaces.

== Discography ==
- 2004: Wandering Eyes (self-released)
- 2006: "The Faces of Victory" – single featuring Styx bassist Chuck Panozzo (self-released)
- 2010: Electric Grids and Concrete Towers (self-released)
- 2015: We Are Overcome with Software Giant (self-released)
- 2019: Fits and Fevers (self-released)

=== Compilations ===
- 2006: Gay Games VII Vol. 2 Chicago 2006 (Centaur Records)
- 2007: Music With A Twist: Revolutions (Columbia Records)

== Awards and honors ==
- 2005 Outmusic Award for "Best Debut Recording – Male"
- Voted "One of the Top 10 Indie CD's of 2005" by The Advocate
