= Mindbloom =

Ketamine-assisted therapy telemedicine service

- Type: Private
- Industry: Telehealth
- Founded: 2018; 8 years ago
- Founders: Dylan Beynon
- Area served: United States (35 states, incl. Washington, D.C.)
- Key people: Dylan Beynon (CEO); Dr. Leonardo Vando (Medical director)
- Website: www.mindbloom.com

Mindbloom is an American telemedicine company that treats anxiety and depression via ketamine-assisted therapy. It was founded in 2018 by Dylan Beynon. The company has contributed to studies researching the effectiveness of ketamine as a treatment for mental health related issues.

== History ==
Mindbloom was founded in late 2018 by Dylan Beynon, an entrepreneur, who also serves as the company's chief executive officer. Beynon previously co-founded Mighty, a legal technology company, with Joshua Schwadron. Beynon was influenced to create Mindbloom through his family's history of mental illness and his own positive experiences with psychedelic medicines.

In September 2019, Mindbloom became an exclusively virtual business. In March 2020, Mindbloom opened an in-person clinic on New York's Fifth Avenue, which was described in a Forbes article as the city's "first legal, upscale guided psychedelic therapy center". Not long after the center's opening, the governor's office of New York issued the PAUSE order in response to the severity of the COVID-19 pandemic, closing all non-essential businesses, causing the company to pivot back to a remote model. Mindbloom, among other telehealth providers, ultimately expanded during the COVID-19 pandemic, partially due to federal officials relaxing rules on telehealth and mailing controlled substances through the temporary suspension of the Ryan Haight Act, a law passed in 2008. In 2022, it was reported in The Wall Street Journal that Mindbloom had hired former House representative Greg Walden for the purpose of lobbying on telehealth policies.

In November 2023, Mindbloom released its Mastermind Series, an episodic therapy program. Each episode addresses a specific issue and is led by its own mental health professional.

== Protocol ==
Patients must first receive approval from a psychiatric clinician certified to prescribe ketamine. In 2021, Mindbloom reported that it denied approximately 35% of applicants to its programs, which included potential cases where symptoms either weren’t severe enough or were too severe for at-home treatment. Other reasons for denial include previously diagnosed substance use disorder, psychosis, and uncontrolled hypertension. New patient programs begin with six ketamine-assisted therapy sessions.

Patients are shipped dissolvable tablets, slow-release lozenges, or faster-acting injectables containing ketamine for use at home. Another household member is expected to be present during use. A trained mental health professional is present via video conference for the first dose. In addition to the medicine, patients are shipped a sleep mask, journal, and blood pressure cuff to monitor their vitals before and after a session. The medicine and additional components are shipped in a branded "Bloombox". Mindbloom also provides a curated soundtrack for patients to listen to during a session. Through the company's mobile app, patients can reach out to clinicians during their treatment, or, access "interactive educational content for use before or after" their sessions.

Other employees, known as "psychedelic guides", meet with patients virtually before and after sessions to process their experiences. Despite there being no formal requirements to become a psychedelic guide, a majority of guides have completed trainings in some form of mental health, life coaching, or crisis management.

=== Studies ===
In 2022, a study was published in the Journal of Affective Disorders, testing the effectiveness of at-home ketamine therapy for treating depression and anxiety, using data from 1,247 Mindbloom patients. This was the largest study regarding the safety and efficacy of ketamine treatments at the time of its publishing. The results showed that 62.8% of patients with depression and 62.9% of patients with anxiety experienced improvement in their symptoms within four weeks, while less than 1% of patients saw their symptoms worsen. 88.6% of patients in the study reported an improvement in their symptoms, with 9.3% of that total accounting for a delayed improvement. The study lacked a control group for comparison and contained limited follow-up data.

In 2024, a follow-up study was published, also in the Journal of Affective Disorders. In a sample of 11,441 Mindbloom patients, 56.4% of those experiencing depression reported an improvement in their symptoms, while 28.1% reported remission in their depressive symptoms after 4 sessions. Among patients who experienced anxiety-related symptoms, 56.1% reported an improvement, while 28.8% of patients reported remission in those symptoms after 4 sessions. Less than 5% of patients responded negatively to the treatment. The study lacked a control group and a fixed dosage of medicine, and showed a drop-off in follow-up data after 4 weeks. The study also found that "mutual activation of depressed mood and anhedonia had a substantial role in maintaining depression despite ongoing treatment."

== Litigation ==
In June 2025, Mindbloom filed a defamation lawsuit in Delaware Superior Court against Dow Jones & Company, publisher of The Wall Street Journal, alleging that a 2024 article falsely implied that Mindbloom was connected to the death of actor Matthew Perry. The complaint stated that Perry had never been a Mindbloom client and had not received ketamine or other treatment from the company or its affiliated clinicians. A spokesperson for The Wall Street Journal denied the allegations and described the lawsuit as meritless.

In October 2025, John Ward, acting on behalf of the estate of his son Phillip Ward, filed a wrongful-death lawsuit against Mindbloom and related defendants in Pitt County, North Carolina. The lawsuit alleged that Mindbloom failed to properly screen Ward before providing at-home ketamine treatment and continued supplying ketamine despite missed appointments and other alleged warning signs. Mindbloom denied wrongdoing, with CEO Dylan Beynon stating that the facts would show the company provided appropriate care.
