= Dillon Forte =

American tattoo artist & entrepreneur (born 1987)

- Born: February 1987 (age 38); Santa Monica, California
- Citizenship: American
- Occupation(s): Tattoo artist, entrepreneur
- Website: www.dillonforte.com

Dillon Forte (born February 1987 in Santa Monica, California) is an American tattoo artist and entrepreneur, based in Austin, Texas. Known for his use of sacred geometry-inspired patterns, Forte has been featured in Paramount Network's The Art of Ink (2018) and the Amazon Studios comedy Jean-Claude Van Johnson (2017).

== Biography ==
Forte was born in Santa Monica, California. His mother is a romance novelist, and his father worked as a fashion photographer. He grew up in Berkeley and Oakland, and got his first tattoo at 16. After spending two years seeking an apprenticeship, at 19, Forte began working for tattoo artist Mark Freitas in Berkley, Forte saw a career in tattoo as a natural progression from his childhood interests of drawing, painting and skateboarding. Inspired by reading Drunvalo Melchizedek's The Ancient Secret of the Flower of Life (1999), Forte became interested in incorporating geometric patterns found in nature, as well as the geometric shapes found in traditional sacred geometry.

After six years, Forte opened his first tattoo studio in Oakland in 2012, and opened his second on Abbot Kinney Boulevard in Venice, Los Angeles in 2019. Forte developed a tetrahedral kite tattoo for artist Kat Von D, and tattooed actor Chris Hemsworth in Morocco, based on a design Hemsworth's daughter made while he was filming Men in Black: International in 2018. Forte additionally worked on tattoos with singer Kehlani and linebacker DeAndre Levy, and in 2018 was featured in an episode of Paramount Network's The Art of Ink, focusing on geometric designs.

In 2019, Forte worked with singer Usher on an elaborate head tattoo, and on a hand tattoo for Imagine Dragons' bassist Ben McKee. In 2020, Forte launched a range of naturally derived eco-friendly tattoo products. In 2022, Dillon Forte tattooed Chris Hemsworth and moved his studio and business to Austin, Texas.

== Style ==
Forte's designs are inspired by sacred geometry and underlying mathematical principles found in nature, and additionally by ancient cosmology, tribal and spiritual art. Forte uses blackwork and dot work tattooing techniques.

== Filmography ==
=== Television ===
Year	Title	Role	Notes
2017	Jean-Claude Van Johnson	Tattoo Artist	Episode: "Run to Nowhere"
2018	The Art of Ink	Himself	Episode: "Geometric"
