= Disappearance of Dylan Ehler =

2020 missing child case in Canada

Dylan Ehler
- Born: Dylan John Ehler; April 16, 2017; Truro, Nova Scotia, Canada
- Disappeared: May 6, 2020 (aged 3); Truro, Nova Scotia, Canada
- Status: Missing for 6 years, 4 months and 4 days
- Parent(s): Jason Ehler; Ashley Brown

Locations 6 May, 2020
1 Elizabeth Street in Truro, Nova Scotia.

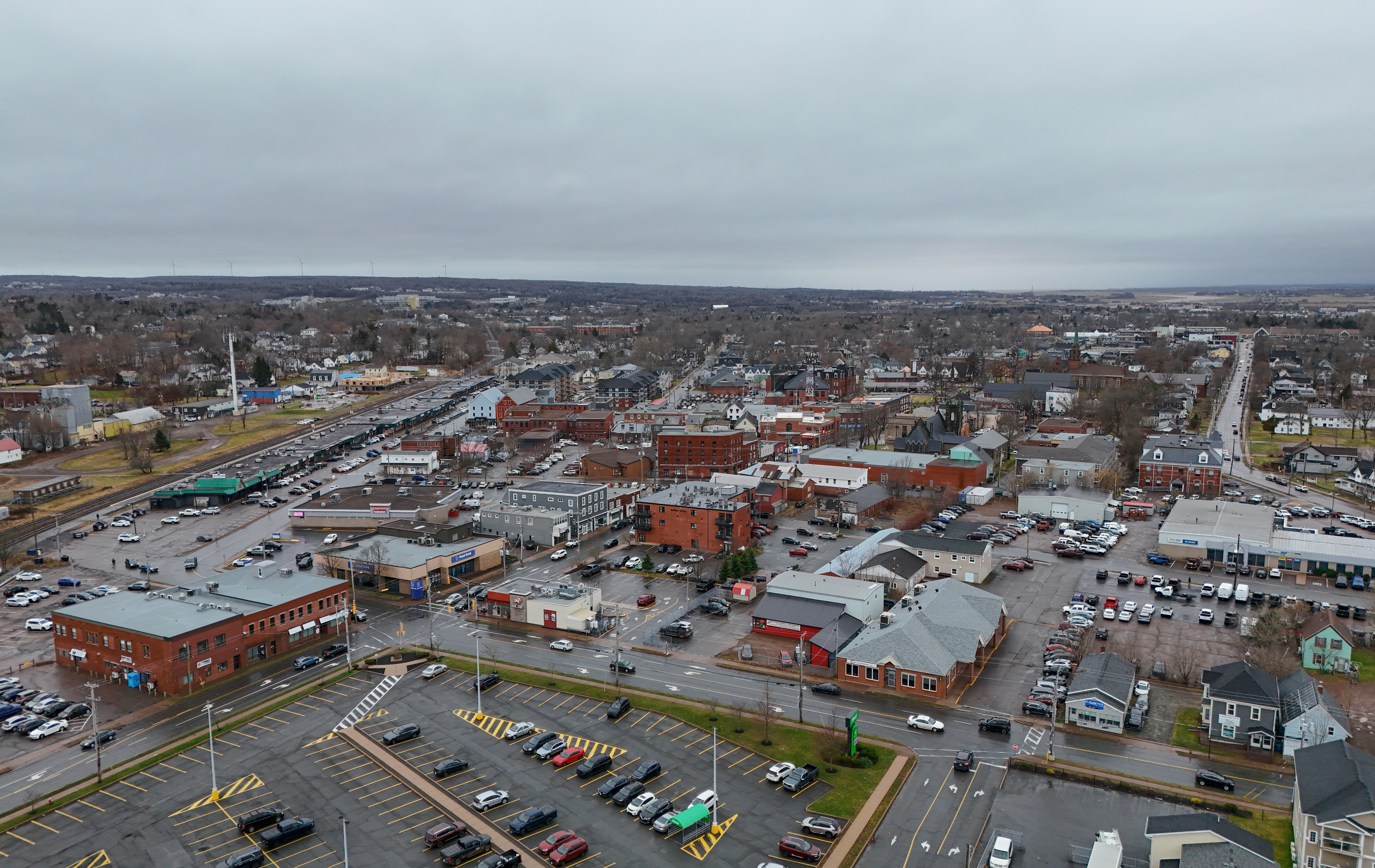
Aerial view of Truro, Nova Scotia

Dylan Ehler is a Canadian boy whose disappearance on May 6, 2020 at the age of 3 became the subject of much media interest. His parents, Ashley Brown and Jason Ehler, criticized what they regarded as shortcomings in the initial police investigation. They also filed suit under provincial cyberbullying law against two administrators of a social media group that had hosted messages suggesting the parents were negligent or responsible for the death of their son.

== Background ==
Dylan Ehler (born April 16, 2017) was three years old when he went missing from the residence of his grandmother, Dorothy Parsons, on Elizabeth Street in Truro, Nova Scotia. His mother, Ashley Brown, had gone to meet a friend for coffee and had dropped the boy off to be watched by Parsons. Dylan's father, Jason Ehler, and Ashley had recently been in a domestic dispute at the time involving a broken cell phone, an alleged assault and a death threat.

According to Parsons, Dylan had been in her backyard with her pet dog when he vanished: "I went to tie the dog on her lead and I turn around and Dylan is just gone. Gone. I have no explanation." Parsons argued that the boy had been abducted. It is unclear how long it took Parsons to tether the dog to its lead, or how long Dylan was out of Parsons's sight; no known suspects were spotted by Parsons in the backyard that day.

Police investigators believed that the boy might have fallen into Lepper Brook, which fed into Salmon River, a local waterway known for a strong undercurrent. Rubber boots, which he was wearing, were found in the waterway and were the only items found after his disappearance.

== Allegations of police misconduct ==
Dylan's father Jason has since blamed the lack of prompt response time by authorities for his ongoing absence, and has expressed criticism toward volunteer rescue workers aiding in the search. According to his mother, "they never treated Dylan’s case like a criminal investigation. They just treated it like a search and rescue. I know that they didn't block off any streets. They didn't stop the public from coming into the crime scene of the area that he went missing and they were very late on issuing alerts and getting help. So I think that tunnel vision did have a play in that. Once they found the boots and that was it, that's where he went and essentially the police tell us that we need to accept it. And move on."

Police searched the waterways near Parsons' backyard for several days, using underwater cameras and thermal imaging devices, as well as rigging up a mannequin with similar bodily proportions to Dylan, putting it in the water to test what would happen.

== Ashley Brown's videos ==
After the disappearance, videos were discovered posted to the social media platform TikTok by Dylan's mother, Ashley Brown. One video featured Ashley lip syncing to an audio with Dylan that said "this motherfucker will send me to jail some day". Another video had been posted of Ashley lip syncing to an audio clip, to the tune of "Do You Want to Build a Snowman?" from Disney's Frozen; "Will you help me hide a body? Come on, we can’t delay... no one can see him on the floor... get him out the door, before he can decay..." There is no evidence to suggest Ashley spoke any of this aloud to Dylan, only that she mouthed the words as the audio played on her phone.

The videos had been deleted by Ashley, then reposted for a short time on a true crime website. They are still publicly available elsewhere. Snippets of the videos can be found featured in the W5 documentary by CTV News, Where's Dylan?.

== Public response ==
In the wake of Dylan's disappearance, and in the light of his mother's video uploads, various online communities considered whether she or another family member had murdered Dylan and hidden his body. Katherine Laidlaw of Wired magazine considered that this public response was in part fueled by the rural nature of The Maritimes and the high rate of missing persons in Nova Scotia, noting that much of the province is covered with thick forest and undeveloped land.

A Facebook group was started, with over 17,000 members at its height, in which the case was debated and allegations were made that Dylan was killed by a family member. The Ehler-Brown Family was also accused of negligence toward Dylan, leading to Halifax lawyer Allison Harris seeking to have the group removed under Nova Scotia's "Intimate Images and Cyber-protection Act", an anti-cyberbullying law. Settlements were reached with the group's two administrators in mid-2021, in which they were forbidden from contacting Dylan's family and from creating any new internet groups about the disappearance.

The legal action was a landmark case in the province regarding cyberbullying (an earlier similar case involving bullied suicide victim Rehtaeh Parsons had been quashed in prior years), although it has been argued that it limits freedom of speech to restrict how uninvolved parties share public discourse about ongoing police investigations. According to Harris, her intent was not to limit free speech online, but rather "to balance freedom of speech on the one hand with preventing harm to people being targeted by malicious online postings on the other". Some of the comments shared in the group included usage of the word "bitch" directed towards Dylan's mother with no critical context, as well as allegations of "Satan worship" and murder, neither of which have ever been proven. Most of the Facebook posts were later removed from the internet, except for those quoted in media interviews for the purposes of reporting the cyberbullying case.

== Ehler-Brown family response ==
Dylan's family have consistently maintained their lack of involvement in his disappearance. Parsons in particular has suggested that the boy may have been abducted while she was busy with her dog, although the police do not suspect foul play. In an interview for CTV News, Dylan's mother admitted that her TikTok videos were inappropriate but argued that the public has taken them out of context; the Frozen song video in particular was intended, according to Ashley, to coincide with an ongoing internet trend of posting parodies of Frozen soundtracks, and the video was meant to be morbid humor in no way related to Dylan.

In January 2022, Dylan's father was arrested and charged with fraud after being caught using a deceased person's banking information at three different financial institutions local to the Bible Hill area. According to Saltwire, "Court information shows Ehler is accused of falsifying cheques written from Melanie MacCormick [deceased party] to himself for various amounts ranging from $100 to $800 each. He is accused of cashing in and defrauding the TD Bank, Royal Bank of Canada and Bank of Montreal in Truro, on occasions from Nov. 15 to 23, 2021."

A year after Dylan's disappearance, his family placed numerous paper boats in Lepper Brook as a form of memorial to the boy, which the public could join in on. "Today was more of a gathering for Dylan, to talk about him and spread awareness, to hold a special moment for him", said his father. "He would have loved to have thrown boats in the water."

== Ehler Alert petition ==
In the hopes of establishing a stronger public alert system in Nova Scotia, Dylan's father started a petition for setting up the "Ehler Alert", a public alert system which would facilitate "the rapid distribution of information to the public about young children lost in potentially hazardous environments", according to Jason.

== See also ==
- List of people who disappeared mysteriously (2000–present)
