= TakeLessons =

Online marketplace for lessons

Microsoft TakeLessons
- Available in: Arabic, Czech, Dutch, English, Esperanto, French, German, Italian, Japanese, Korean, Polish, Portuguese, Russian, Simplified Chinese, Spanish, Thai, Traditional Chinese, Turkish and Vietnamese
- Headquarters: San Diego
- Country of origin: United States
- Founder: Steven Cox
- Industry: Language Learning
- Parent: Microsoft
- Website: takelessons.com
- Launched: 2007; 19 years ago
- Current status: Shut down

TakeLessons was an online platform that connected students with instructors for a variety of subjects offering both online and in-person individual and group lessons. The online marketplace covered topics including in areas like cooking, music, languages, academic subjects, and professional training.

The platform was launched in 2007 in San Diego initially for music teaching. In 2021, Microsoft acquired the platform.

The last day to book lessons was August 15, 2024 and the website closed on November 15, 2024.

== See also ==
- Preply
- Italki
