= Dylan Fontani =

French professional footballer (born 1997)

Personal information
- Full name: Dylan Fontani
- Date of birth: 13 February 1997 (age 29)
- Place of birth: La Seyne-sur-Mer, France
- Height: 1.92 m (6 ft 4 in)
- Position: Centre-back

Senior career*
Years	Team	Apps	(Gls)
2016–2017	Montpellier II	19	(0)
2017–2018	Toulon	11	(0)
2018–2020	Niort II	15	(0)
2018–2020	Niort	0	(0)
2020	→ Hyères (loan)	3	(0)
2020	Hyères	2	(0)
- * Club domestic league appearances and goals as of 07:28, 4 November 2020 (UTC)

Dylan Fontani (born 13 February 1997) is a French professional footballer who currently plays as a centre-back.

== Professional career ==
Fonatni joined Toulon on 17 June 2017, from the youth academy of Montpellier HSC. On 29 July 2018, Fontani signed his first professional contract with Chamois Niortais. Fonatni made his professional with Niort in a 1-0 Coupe de la Ligue loss to LB Châteauroux on 14 August 2018.

On 1 February 2020, Fontani joined Championnat National 2 club Hyères on loan until the end of the 2019–20 season. He joined the club permanently at the end of the season and played two games in the 2020-21 season, before his contract was terminated by mutual consent on 21 October 2020.
