= Dylan Walsh (hurler) =

Irish hurler (born 1998)

Personal information
- Native name: Diolún Breathnach (Irish)
- Born: 1998 (age 27–28) Ballingarry, County Tipperary, Ireland
- Occupation: Garda

Sport
- Sport: Hurling
- Position: Right corner-forward
Club
- Years: Club
- Ballingarry
Club titles
- Tipperary titles: 0
College
- Years: College
- Garda College
College titles
- Fitzgibbon titles: 0
Inter-county
- Years: County
- 2022-present: Tipperary
Inter-county titles
- Munster titles: 0
- All-Irelands: 0
- NHL: 0
- All Stars: 0

Dylan Walsh (born 1998) is an Irish hurler. At club level he plays with Ballingarry and at inter-county level with the Tipperary senior hurling team.

== Career ==
Walsh played hurling as a student at Presentation Secondary School in Ballingarry. He later played with the Garda College and won a Ryan Cup medal in 2025 after a 0–19 to 1–13 defeat of Technological University Dublin in the final.

After progressing through the juvenile and underage ranks with the Ballingarry club, Walsh eventually started to line out at adult level. He captained Ballingarry to the South Tipperary IHC title in 2021, after a 0–24 to 1–15 win over Moyle Rovers.

Walsh first appeared on the inter-county scene with Tipperary as a member of the minor team in 2016. He won a Munster MHC medal that year before later winning an All-Ireland MHC medal following a 1–21 to 0–17 defeat of Limerick in the final. Walsh immediately progressed to the under-21 team and won an All-Ireland U21HC medal after a 3–13 to 1–16 win over Cork in the 2018 All-Ireland under-21 final.

After being associated with the senior team for the first time in 2022, Walsh became a regular member of the team during the National Hurling League in 2025.

== Honours ==
Garda College

- Ryan Cup: 2025

Ballingarry

- South Tipperary Intermediate Hurling Championship: 2021

Tipperary

- All-Ireland Under-21 Hurling Championship: 2018
- Munster Under-21 Hurling Championship: 2018
- All-Ireland Minor Hurling Championship: 2016
- Munster Minor Hurling Championship: 2016
