= Dylan Kight =

American singer-songwriter

- Born: Robert Dylan Kight; September 4, 1984 (age 42)
- Origin: Atlanta, Georgia, US
- Genres: indie, anti-folk, americana
- Occupations: singer, songwriter, musician
- Instruments: Vocals, guitar
- Years active: 2004–present
- Label: Aztec Ballroom Records
- Website: www.dylankight.com, www.dylankight.net

Dylan Kight (born September 4, 1984) is an American singer-songwriter Known as the "lost" record. What should have been the debut record for Dylan Kight became one of his first tests as an artist. It took over 8 months to record and consisted of about 30 songs. The record was almost mixed when the record was lost. It was recorded on 2 inch analog tape and then transferred to Pro Tools HD to maximize mixing capabilities. However, at some point the hard drive malfunctioned and the record was lost. Dylan Kight's side project at the time, Daydream Deferred had already used the 2 inch tape to record on. Feel The Silence was forever lost. The only thing that remains are early mixes of the album on CD.

== No Destination but Heartbreak Ave. ==
Kight quickly started the album from scratch and decided to rename the record, No Destination but Heartbreak Ave. In the wake of losing, Feel The Silence. Consisting almost entirely of new songs the record was nothing like the one that was almost complete of Feel The Silence.

=== Press ===
Sweet Misery selected as Track of the week August 28, 2006 by GarageBand.com "Man on Fire" selected as track of the day on September 7, 2006, by GarageBand.com

JoeRockhead.com Overall, it reminds me of some of the more magic moments of British folk rock. You remember—back when it had balls..."

== The Nightbirds Revolt ==
Recorded immediately after the release of No Destination but Heartbreak Ave.. The Nightbirds Revolt is a strong cohesive album. Born out of a sonic dream sequence. Dylan Kight & The Nightbirds played two dozen local shows for the support of this record. Receiving national press in Performing Songwriter where The Nightbirds Revolt was selected as a top 12 DIY release in December 2008.

== Places in Between ==
An acoustic EP with some of the most personal songs Dylan Kight has released to date. Produced, engineered and mastered by David Barbe in Athens at Chase Park Transduction. David Barbe also played bass and backing vocals.

== Discography ==
- Feel The Silence (2005)
- Sweet Misery (2006)
- No Destination but Heartbreak Ave. (2006)
- The Nightbirds Revolt (2007)
- Places in Between (2010)

== Notes ==
- https://web.archive.org/web/20081222014108/http://www.performingsongwriter.com/pages/music/114.cfm
- http://www.joerockhead.com/shop/index.php?main_page=product_info&products_id=1051
- https://web.archive.org/web/20081222014108/http://www.performingsongwriter.com/pages/music/114.cfm
- https://wildysworld.blogspot.com/2008/09/cd-review-dylan-kight-nightbirds-revolt.html
- http://sonicbids.com/dylankight
- http://www.garageband.com/song?|pe1|S8LTM0LdsaSjY1C_YWs
