= Xbox Underground =

Hacker group

Xbox Underground was an international hacker group responsible for gaining unauthorized access to the computer network of Microsoft and its development partners, including Activision, Epic Games, and Valve, in order to obtain sensitive information relating to Xbox One and Xbox Live.

== Microsoft ==
Microsoft's computer network was compromised repeatedly by the Xbox Underground between 2011 and 2013. According to a 65-page indictment, the hackers spent "hundreds of hours" searching through Microsoft's network copying log-in credentials, source code, technical specifications and other data. This culminated in the perpetrators carrying out a physical theft, by using stolen credentials to enter "a secure building" at Microsoft's Redmond headquarters and exiting with publicly unreleased prototypes of the Xbox One codenamed "Durango". Group members say they were driven by a strong curiosity about Microsoft's then-unreleased Xbox One console and associated software.

Beginning in or about January 2011, Microsoft was the victim of incidents of unauthorized access to its computer networks, including GDNP's protected computer network, which resulted in the theft of log-in credentials, trade secrets and intellectual property relating to its Xbox gaming system. ^{p. 4}

In or about September 2013, Alcala and Pokora brokered a physical theft, committed by A.S. and E.A., of multiple Xbox Development Kits (XDKs) from a secure building on Microsoft's Redmond, Washington campus. Using stolen access credentials to a Microsoft building, A.S. and E.A. entered the building and stole three non-public versions of the Xbox One console... ^{p. 31}

== Apache helicopter simulator software ==
The group is also accused of breaching the computer network of Zombie Studios, through which they obtained Apache helicopter simulator software developed for the United States military. In a wiretap, David Pokora was quoted as saying: "Have you been listening to the [expletive] that I've done this past month? I have [expletive] to the U.S. military. I have [expletive] to the Australian Department of Defense ... I have every single big company – Intel, AMD, Nvidia – any game company you could name, Google, Microsoft, Disney, Warner Bros., everything."

== Members ==
Four out of six members of the group have pleaded guilty to charges.

David Pokora

David Pokora, the first foreign hacker ever to be sentenced on United States soil, received an 18-month prison term on April 23, 2014, and was released in July 2015.

Sanad Nesheiwat

Sanad Nesheiwat was sentenced on June 11 and received an 18-month prison term.

Holly Leroux

Holly LeRoux (formerly known as Nathan LeRoux) was sentenced on June 11 and received a term of 24 months. Before serving her sentence, Leroux was allowed to live with her parents with an ankle monitor, where she tried to escape to Canada but was caught at the border. Leroux and a female were later found deceased while wearing respirators inside a motel room where evidence of a chemical-making process was found, and the police chief quoted as saying "We’re not certain at this point whether or not this is a murder-suicide or maybe a double suicide or accidental death."

Austin Alcala

Austin Alcala was due for sentencing in July, though, he went on to cooperate with the FBI in resolving another criminal case involving the illegal trade of FIFA coins.

Dylan Wheeler

Dylan Wheeler (referred to in the indictment as D.W), currently in the UK, lived in Australia at the time. Wheeler was charged with an array of offences following a raid on his Perth home address, including possession of an offensive weapon, drugs and child pornography. He was not convicted, having fled from Australia to Dubai and eventually the Czech Republic over what he claimed were human rights and political issues with his trial. from where he cannot be extradited since he holds Czech citizenship, and is currently living in the UK. His mother, Anna Wheeler, was later jailed for more than two years for helping him flee Australia to avoid criminal charges.

Justin May

Wheeler alleges that a sixth member, Justin May (referred to as "Person A"), worked with the FBI "to bring down the group". May had previously been placed on pre-trial probation for an earlier offense involving data theft, the agreement of which required him to stay off Xbox Live. He came under renewed interest from the FBI in 2017 after they seized a new BMW coupe and $38,595 in cash that was hidden throughout his home. In June 2021, May was sentenced to seven years in prison for defrauding over 3.5 million dollars from several tech companies, among them Microsoft and Cisco Systems, by exploiting warranty policies to illegitimately receive replacements which were then sold online.
