= Dylan Loewe =

American speechwriter, political strategist and author

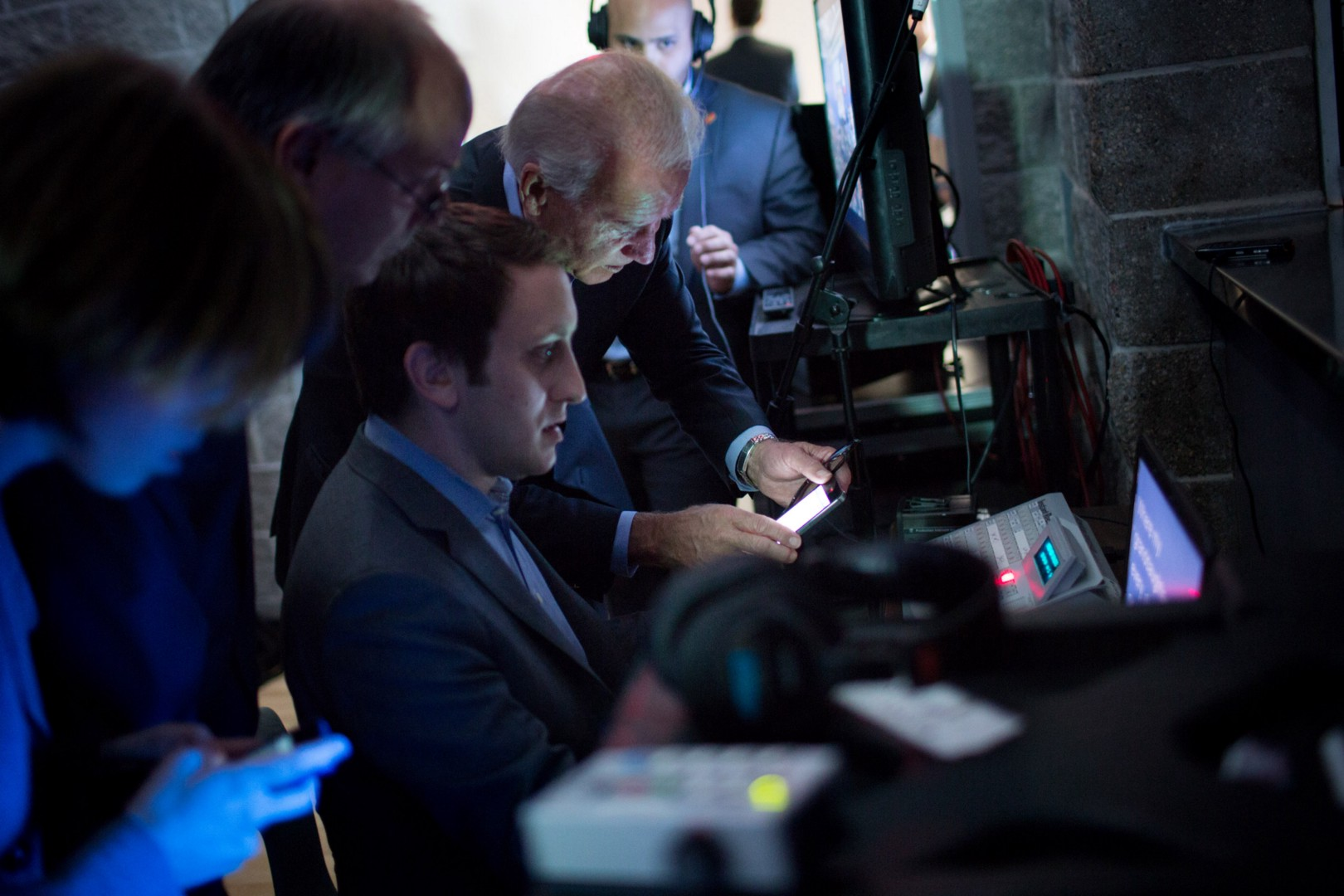
- Loewe with Joe Biden
- Born: Los Angeles, California
- Education: University of California, Los Angeles (BA); Harvard University (MPP); Columbia University (JD)
- Occupations: Speechwriter, ghostwriter, author, political commentator
- Years active: 2010–present
- Website: Official website

Dylan Loewe is an American speechwriter, political strategist and author. In 2021, Loewe was named chief speechwriter to Apple CEO Tim Cook. He served as chief speechwriter to then-Vice President Joe Biden from 2012 to 2013. He has collaborated with several authors on their memoirs, including the former Israeli Prime Minister Shimon Peres and Vice President Kamala Harris. In 2010, he authored the book Permanently Blue: How Democrats Can End the Republican Party and Rule the Next Generation.

== Early life and education ==
Loewe was born in Los Angeles. He received his bachelor's degree in political science from the University of California, Los Angeles in 2004. He earned a master's degree in public policy from Harvard Kennedy School at Harvard University in 2010. He completed a J.D. degree from Columbia Law School.

== Career ==
He began his career as a regular contributor to the Huffington Post and the Guardian. In 2010, he authored the book Permanently Blue: How Democrats Can End the Republicans Party and Rule the Next Generation. That same year, he became a senior writer at the Washington-based speechwriting firm West Wing Writers. In 2012, he was appointed special assistant to President Barack Obama and chief speechwriter to then-Vice President Biden. In 2013, the National Journal named him one of the administration's top decision-makers. In 2016, Loewe assisted with the writing of the memoir of former Israeli Prime Minister Shimon Peres, No Room for Small Dreams. He was a collaborator on Vice President Kamala Harris's memoir, The Truths We Hold: An American Journey, which was published in 2019. He is also credited with helping to write Elton John's 2012 book, Love is the Cure: On Life, Loss, and the End of Aids.

In 2020, he founded The Lead Pen, a writing and public affairs consultancy. He has taught speechwriting at Stanford University and American University.

== Books ==
- Loewe, Dylan (2010). Permanently Blue: How Democrats Can End the Republican Party and Rule the Next Generation. Three Rivers Press. ISBN 978-0307717993.
