= Dylan Smith =

Dylan Smith may refer to:

- Dylan Akio Smith (born 1974), Canadian film director and producer
- Dylan Smith, real name of Mamba Smith (born 1992), American social media personality, commentator, and racing driver
- Dylan Smith (actor) (born 1975), Canadian actor
- Dylan Smith (Australian rules footballer) (born 1982), Australian former AFL player
- Dylan Smith (baseball) (born 2000), American MLB pitcher
- Dylan Smith (businessman) (born 1985), American co-founder and CFO of Box
- Dylan Smith (rugby union) (born 1994), South African professional rugby union player
- Dylan Smith (Scottish footballer) (born 2006), Scottish professional footballer
- Dylan Smith (soccer) (born 1996), Australian association footballer
- Dylan Thomas-Smith (born 2004), English actor
