= Dylan Graves =

American artist and curator

- Born: 1997 (age 28–29); Cincinnati, Ohio, United States
- Occupation: Photographer
- Website: whosdylangraves.com

Dylan Graves (born 1997) is an American artist and curator from Cincinnati, Ohio known for his photographs, digital collage, and print techniques such as chromogenic and lenticular printing. Graves has exhibited work across the United States, including at the Cincinnati Art Museum.

Graves studied at the Savannah College of Art and Design. In 2020 when some of his in-person exhibitions were canceled, he explored online ways of releasing new work. Graves has also participated in Non-fungible token (NFT) projects with other artists.

As a freelance artist, Graves has completed work for clients including the Cincinnati Bengals, FC Cincinnati, and Desiigner.
