= Dylan Waldron =

British artist (born 1953)

Dylan Waldron RBSA is a British artist, born in Newcastle-Under-Lyme in 1953. He was educated at Stourbridge College of Art and University of Wolverhampton, graduating with a BA Honours in art in 1976. Since then, Waldron has exhibited both nationally and internationally. His work has been exhibited regularly in the Royal Academy Summer Exhibition and has been purchased for private collections worldwide. Furthermore, Waldron's work is also in the public collections of institutions nationwide, including West Midlands Art Association, Basildon Arts Trust, Leicester University, Royal Birmingham Society of Artists and the Birmingham Museums Trust. He is represented by the renowned Goldmark Gallery which focuses on commercially successful contemporary artists.

He works in traditional techniques such as painting in egg tempera and silverpoint. These are techniques often associated with Renaissance artists such as Leonardo da Vinci and are now less common techniques amongst contemporary artists. He has won numerous prizes for his tempera and silverpoint works, including First Prize of £1,000 in the RBSA Prize exhibition 2014. Waldron also constructs the frames for each of his works, which he believes is as important as the art itself.
