= Dylan Thompson (disambiguation) =

Dylan Thompson (born 1991) is an American retired NFL player.

Dylan Thompson may also refer to:

- Dylan Thompson, American snowboarder who competed in Winter X Games XVII

== Fictional characters ==
- Dylan Thompson, in the UK sitcom Cuckoo, played by Tyger Drew-Honey
