= Dylan Small =

Dylan Shepard Small is an American statistician.

Small earned a Bachelor of Arts degree from Harvard University in 1997, followed by a doctorate at Stanford University in 2002. Upon completing his PhD, Small joined the Wharton School faculty. At Wharton, Small has held the Class of 1965 Wharton Professorship in Statistics and the Universal Furniture Professorship of statistics and data science.

In 2013, Small was elected fellow of the American Statistical Association and was a chair-elect candidate for the ASA's Section on Statistics in Epidemiology. Ten years later, Small was elected a fellow of the Institute of Mathematical Statistics.
