= Ellie Dylan =

Executive

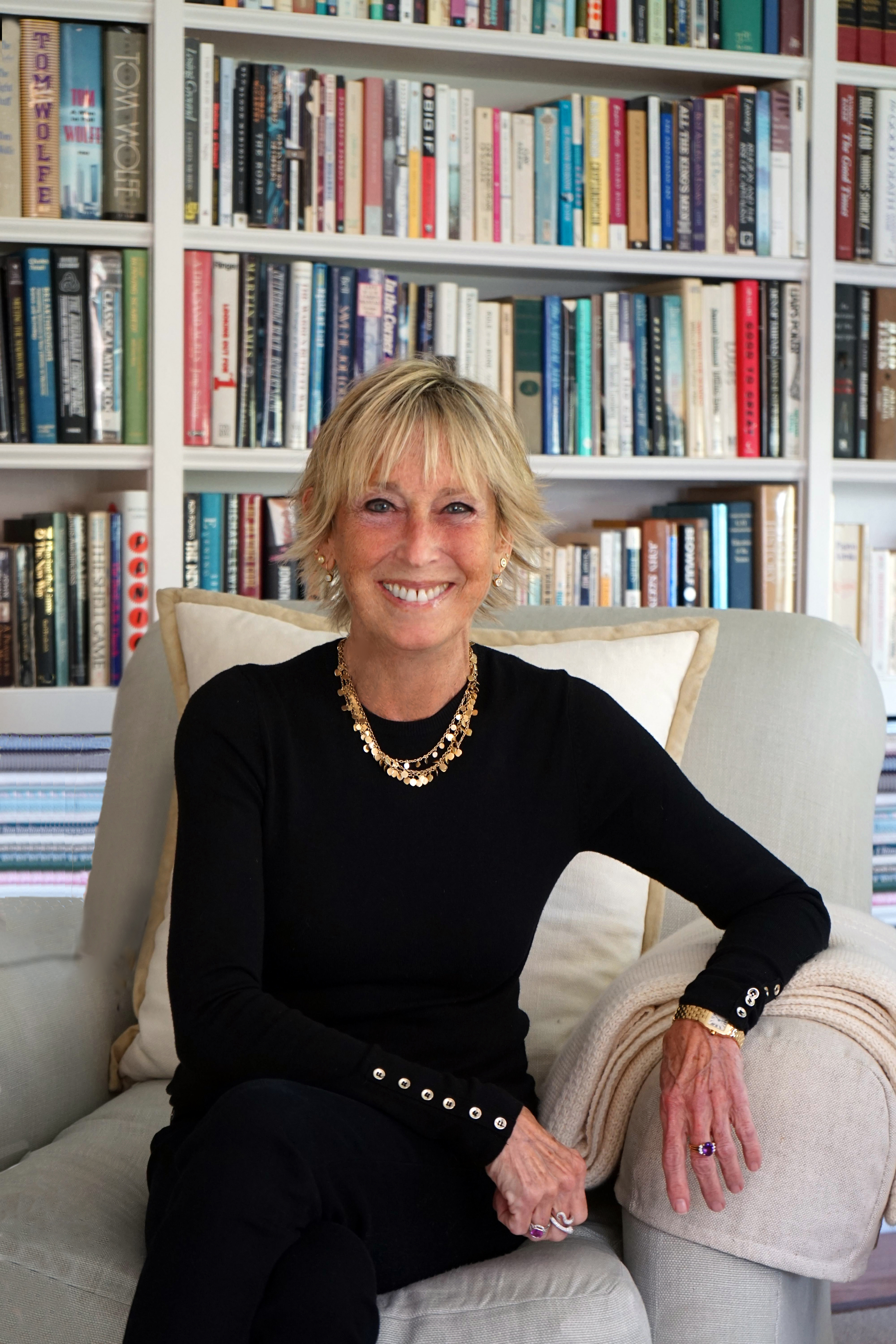
- Born: September 8, 1952 (age 74); Chattanooga, Tennessee
- Education: Tulane University
- Occupations: disc jockey; television host; documentary producer
- Children: Sky Dylan-Robbins
- Website: Official website

Ellie Dylan (born Elinor Angel Helman September 8, 1952) is the president and founder of The Skyshapers Foundation (dba Skyshapers University) and the CEO, president and founder of SKY U, LLC.

Dylan began her career in radio as a college disc jockey and rose to become "the most listened to female disc jockey in the United States" on NBC Radio: Dylan took her 7:00pm-to-midnight time shift on WMAQ from 17th place in the ratings to the number-one rated show in Chicago, and then became the first woman to do an afternoon drive shift on AM radio in a major market. She went on to become the first woman to hold a morning drive time position on AM radio in a major market when she replaced Don Imus at WNBC in New York City in 1977.

Dylan next moved to television as the host and producer of “You!,” a weekly television series on WABC-TV in New York City. Her program grew into a solid ratings success following Dylan's initial telecast, which was nominated for three Emmy Awards. Her “You!” show went on to win an Emmy Award and became number one in the ratings.

Dylan later established Skyshapers University and Sky U to develop and produce multimedia programs to motivate elementary school-age children to excel. More than 7.5 million children and more than 10,000 schools across America have participated in Skyshapers University programs.

Subsequently, Dylan produced and co-directed the feature documentary, On Our Own Island, which received many accolades and screened at film festivals around the world.

== Early life ==
Ellie Dylan was born in Chattanooga, Tennessee, but spent her formative years in Columbus, Georgia. She later explained that growing up in the Deep South during the Civil Rights Movement had a profound impact on her life.

Dylan left Georgia to attend Tulane University in New Orleans and spent her junior year abroad at the University of London. Returning to New Orleans, Dylan graduated with honors, Phi Beta Kappa and magna cum laude, from Tulane and was accepted by Tulane's Law School.

Dylan relates that during those college years, she experienced two life-changing events which shaped her future. The first occurred when her freshman English professor gave Dylan an “F” on a major paper she had written, explaining that she would continue to fail Dylan until she worked at her full potential. (This professor later bestowed the honor of Phi Beta Kappa on Dylan upon her graduation in the top percentile of her class at Tulane in 1974.)

During her college years, Dylan was also a disc jockey on WTUL, the Tulane campus radio station, where she played music from The Grateful Dead, Bob Dylan, etc. and began to discover the power of the media to create change.

Dylan relates that her passion for radio became such that on every college vacation she attempted to get a job at a “real radio station” in her hometown, only to be told time after time “Women are not on the radio.”

Finally, the summer before she was to begin law school, Dylan was hired to do radio shows on WWRH and WPNX in her hometown. There she posed pointed questions to the likes of David Duke, Grand Dragon of the KKK, and Lester Maddox, controversial Georgia Governor, who is reported to have walked off her show. Thereafter, a local radio station employee told Dylan “You’ll never make it in radio. Because you’re different.”

Soon after, Dylan heard about a nationwide talent search for ‘The Queen of Country Music’ from WMAQ Radio (the NBC-owned Chicago radio station, which covers 38 states and Canada). Dylan sent in a three-minute biographical tape backed by Earl Scruggs banjo picking. Again, Dylan was “different” and won the talent search.

== Career ==
=== Radio (1975-78) ===
In 1975, Dylan moved to Chicago and accepted the job as "The Queen of Country Music" at WMAQ, a hefty salary, and a new surname (after her favorite musician, Bob Dylan). By June of that year, Dylan was on the cover of the Chicago Tribune Sunday Magazine, which called her "82 pounds and 50,000 watts of down-home disc jockey." In her two years at WMAQ, Dylan turned her 7:00pm-to-midnight shift into the number-one rated music show in Chicago. She then became the first woman to do an afternoon drive shift on AM radio in a major market, and doubled the ratings in the 3-7pm slot.

In September 1977, Dylan joined WNBC, NBC's flagship radio station in New York, as the first woman to hold a morning drive time shift on AM radio in a major market. There she replaced Don Imus. Although Imus had a loyal following, Dylan in her first rating book increased WNBC's morning audience, and became the most listened-to female disc jockey in the United States. But the success at WNBC did not last though, as the station's switch to a more streamlined format was short-lived; and Ellie was gone from WNBC within a few months.

=== Television (1978-85) ===
But Dylan itched to broaden her horizons and set her sights on television, explaining that she wanted to “create a kind of ‘reality show’ that is honest, clear, and alive.”

On Saturday, September 30, 1978, Ellie Dylan’s You! show premiered on WABC-TV in New York and was subsequently nominated for three Emmy Awards. Called “one of the best rating increase stories ever” by WABC-TV, in February 1979, Ellie Dylan's You! show became number one in the ratings and “the hottest show in New York television” and won an Emmy Award.

By 1980, Dylan also began hosting and producing a series of one-hour Ellie Dylan Specials in her first departure from the You! format. Stints on other television programs followed: Kids are People Too, The Love Report and later, The Today Show.

=== Multimedia education (1985–2020) ===
Drawing from her past when she was discouraged from becoming a radio disc jockey and then a television host/producer, only to succeed at both, Dylan next set her sights on developing entertainment to motivate children.

In 1986, Dylan started Skyshapers, Inc., a company to produce motivational entertainment products and programs for children. By August 1988, Dylan had also formed a 501(c)(3) public charity, the Skyshapers Foundation to develop and distribute children's motivational programs and scholarships. Along with creating 22 original cartoon characters and an original rock music soundtrack, Dylan put together an advisory board and forged alliances with the Department of Health and Human Services to develop a program that would motivate children by giving them “action steps” to reach their dreams.

=== Government partnerships ===
After seven years of market research and focus groups with children, the Skyshapers Foundation program was endorsed by the U.S. Surgeon General, Antonia Novello. It was federally funded and distributed in 20 percent of the elementary schools in the U.S., reaching more than 10,000 schools and 7.5 million children. It became one of the largest programs of its kind the Public Health Service has ever run in American schools.

In excess of 14 million pieces of Skyshapers materials were distributed to fulfill orders from 10,000 public and private elementary schools, and thousands of Boys' and Girls' Clubs, Scout troops, and church- and synagogue-affiliated youth groups in the United States. Inspired by the successful response to the Skyshapers Program, Dylan and her team began developing Skyshapers textbooks and teacher editions; the first of which was the Sky Quest series.

In 1999, Skyshapers became an official vendor for textbooks and teachers' editions for the New York City Board of Education, and Dylan began developing and delivering programs for the New York City school system, the largest in America with over 1 million students in more than 1,400 schools. In 2003, Dylan started Sky U, L.L.C., to serve as the production entity for the marketing and distribution of Skyshapers University products and programs.

=== Quest For Excellence ===
In 2005, Dylan began The SKY U Quest For Excellence initiative in NYC schools, with Sky U and Skyshapers University producing and delivering SKY U Quest For Excellence Live Events for students, Faculty Training Seminars, SKY U Tracker Organizer Systems, SKY U Activity Sets, SKY U Incentive Cards, and Leaders’ Curriculum Sets.

SKYSHAPERS University programs use cartoon characters, an intergalactic theme, music, and language aimed at children. Dylan described the programs as combining entertainment with educational and lifestyle messages for children.

=== Documentary filmmaking (2014–present) ===
In 2022, Dylan completed and premiered the feature documentary, On Our Own Island, a timeless true love story that chronicles the seasons of a relationship from its romantic beginnings through life’s final moments. On Our Own Island, described as “vivid, lyrical, and loving,” was produced by Dylan to mitigate society's fear of death while illustrating that unconditional love is the most important thing of all. Dylan co-directed the film with her daughter, Sky Dylan-Robbins, also a filmmaker and journalist. The film was inspired by and dedicated to Dylan's husband of 33 years and Sky's father, Steven Robbins, who died in February 2016. On Our Own Island has won numerous awards and screened at film festivals in the United States and around the world.

== Articles ==
- (June 22, 1975) Terry, Clifford, Chicago Tribune Sunday Magazine Cover Story
- (February 1980) WABC-TV Biography
- (October 11, 1992) AP Wire Service Story
- (November 9, 1992) Nick Chiles, “Teaching Kids The Sky’s No Limit,” New York Newsday
- (September 1, 2007) Malcolm N. Carter, Associated Press Writer, Not Another Imus Blog
