= Dylan John Riley =

American sociologist (born 1971)

- Born: 1971 (age 54–55)

Academic background
- Education: University of California, Los Angeles
- Thesis: Hegemony and Domination: Civil Society and Regime Variation in Inter-War Europe (2002)
- Doctoral advisor: Rebecca Jean Emigh, Michael Mann, Perry Anderson, Carlo Ginzburg
- Influences: Antonio Gramsci

Academic work
- Discipline: Sociologist
- Sub-discipline: Comparative historical research
- Institutions: University of California, Berkeley
- Main interests: Civil society, fascism, cultural hegemony

Dylan John Riley (born 1971) is Professor of Sociology at the University of California, Berkeley, and is on the editorial committee of the New Left Review (NLR). He writes for the NLR and Jacobin.

== Publications ==
=== Books ===
- Doctoral dissertation, Hegemony and Domination: Civil Society and Regime Variation in Inter-War Europe, University of California, Los Angeles, 2002
- The Civic Foundations of Fascism in Europe: Italy, Spain, and Romania 1870-1945, Johns Hopkins University Press, 2010
- How Societies and States Count: A Comparative Genealogy of Censuses with Rebecca Jean Emigh and Patricia Ahmed, Palgrave Press, 2016:
  - Volume 1: Antecedents of Censuses: From Medieval to Nation States
  - Volume 2: Changes in Censuses: From Imperialism to Welfare States
- upcoming Rethinking Liberal Democracy and the Fascist Legacy

=== Selected papers ===
- The Third Reich as Rogue Regime: Adam Tooze’s Wages of Destruction, Historical Materialism, vol. 22, nos 3-4, 2014
