= Sky Dylan-Robbins =

American journalist, documentary producer and media entrepreneur

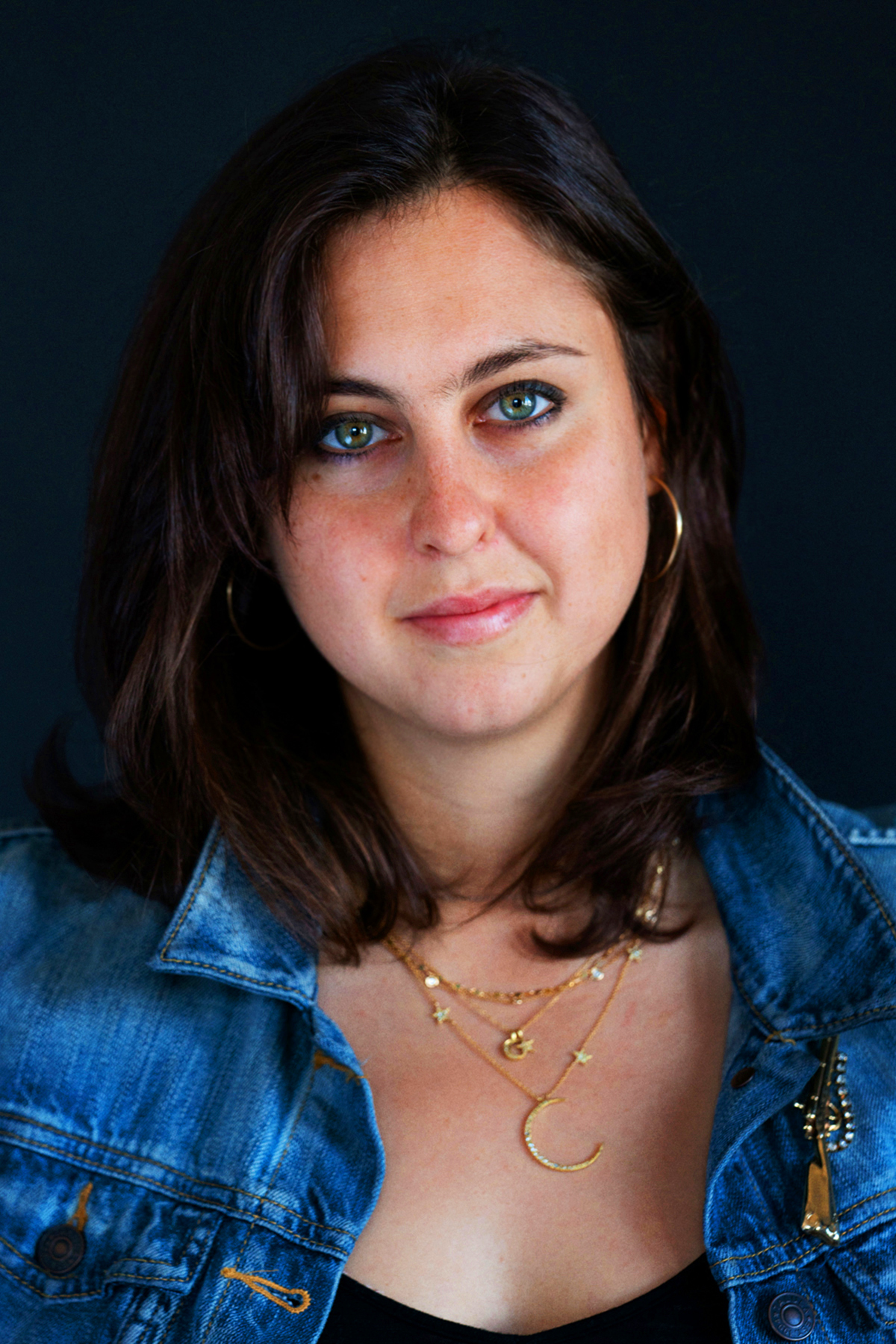
- Born: January 14, 1989 (age 37); New York City, U.S.
- Education: Northwestern University
- Occupations: Journalist, documentary producer, entrepreneur
- Website: www.skydylanrobbins.com

Sky Dylan-Robbins (born Skyler Dylan-Robbins on January 14, 1989) is an American journalist, documentary producer and media entrepreneur. She is the founder and Executive Director of The Video Consortium, a global nonprofit network that connects journalists and documentary filmmakers around the world. She was a journalist at The New Yorker and a producer at NBC News.

== Early life ==
Born and raised in New York City, Dylan-Robbins is the only child of media personality and education entrepreneur Ellie Dylan and Steven Robbins, a business executive. She attended the Rudolf Steiner School on Manhattan's Upper East Side and went on to receive a Bachelor of Arts in Radio/Television/Film, Italian, and Sociology from Northwestern University, cum laude. She spent her junior year making films in Italy and studying cinema at the University of Bologna.

== Career ==
Dylan-Robbins began her career at Tumblr as its editorial video lead. With journalist Jessica Bennett and media executive Chris Mohney, she covered subcultures, news, and trends among the platform's 475 million blogs for its online magazine, Storyboard, while partnering with media outlets like Time and WNYC.

In 2013, she was hired by The New Yorker's Nicholas Thompson to produce the magazine's video series and short documentaries. Dylan-Robbins worked at the magazine alongside Myles Kane and Kristina Budelis when video was becoming the focus of media outlets as a tool for growth and developed The New Yorker's video strategy. During her four years at the magazine, Dylan-Robbins reported on a range of topics from the rise of e-cigarettes and the overuse of c-sections to California's deadly drought and psilocybin's healing effects on the terminally ill. She helped migrate the magazine onto emerging platforms like Snapchat to reach a younger audience.

In 2017, Dylan-Robbins left the magazine for NBC to help launch a new video initiative under the umbrella of NBC News. She worked across digital, streaming, and broadcast departments, reporting on stories in America, Japan, Italy, and the Balkans. She worked at NBC exactly forty years after her mother, Ellie Dylan, was at the network, which inspired Dylan-Robbins to use old segments from her mother's reportage and feature them to show changing trends across the decades. While at The New Yorker, Dylan-Robbins founded the Video Consortium, a 501(c)3-registered nonprofit network that supports, develops, and connects the next generation of video journalists and documentary filmmakers with resources, tools, and jobs. The network has chapters around the world. Dylan-Robbins serves as its Executive Director.

Dylan-Robbins is recognized for her media innovation and was chosen by Forbes magazine as a 30 under 30 in the Media category. She has received numerous journalism accolades, including Pictures of the Year International, New York Press Club, the Newswomen's Club of New York, the James Beard Foundation, and the Society of Publication Designers. She won a Webby Award in 2013 for her work with Storyboard.
