= Dillon D. Jordan =

American film producer

Dillon D. Jordan is an American film producer. He is the founder of production company PaperChase Films. He is best known as the producer of Skin and the executive producer of the films The Kindergarten Teacher and The Kid. In 2022, he pled guilty to running a prostitution ring and received a five-year prison sentence.

== Early life ==
Jordan was born in North Hollywood, CA and raised in Los Angeles. Before starting in film, he worked in and ran nightclubs.

== Career ==
In 2013, Jordan founded PaperChase Films. Four years later, he associate produced Bodied directed by Joseph Kahn and produced by Adi Shankar and Eminem. In 2018, Jordan executive produced The Kindergarten Teacher which won Best Director (US Drama) for Sara Colangelo at the Sundance Film Festival and was acquired by Netflix for North American distribution. Maggie Gyllenhaal and Gael García Bernal play the lead roles.

That same year, he produced Skin written and directed by Academy Award-winner Guy Nattiv, starring Jamie Bell and Danielle Macdonald. Skin was acquired by A24 for North American distribution in 2019. Also in 2018, Jordan produced Heavy, directed by Jouri Smit, starring Sophie Turner and Daniel Zovatto.

== Prostitution trafficking ==
On July 15, 2021, Jordan was indicted by the United States Attorney for the Southern District of New York on charges of operating a prostitution business and money laundering. On September 1, 2022, Jordan pled guilty to conspiracy to operate a prostitution business which prosecutors stated delivered women to clients in the United States and England. As part of his plea, it was initially agreed Jordan would serve between 21 months and 27 months in prison, and pay a fine between $10,000 and $95,000. It also calls for him to forfeit $1.4 million. US District Judge John P. Cronan scheduled for a sentence to be handed down December 12, 2022.

The DOJ released a statement on 9/1/2022 that reads in part "... JORDAN, 50, of Arrowhead Lake, California, pled guilty to one count of conspiracy to violate the Mann Act, which carries a maximum sentence of five years in prison. As part of his guilty plea, JORDAN has agreed to forfeit $1,429,717 to the United States. The sentencing of JORDAN is scheduled for December 12, 2022, before Judge Cronan..."

On February 9, 2023, two months after the initial sentencing was scheduled to be handed down, Cronan sentenced Jordan to the maximum five-year prison sentence. When he was sentenced, it was determined that in addition to running a prostitution ring for a seven-year period, Jordan physically abused and drugged women who served in the ring as well.
