= Sharpie Smile =

American indie pop duo

- Origin: Los Angeles, California
- Genres: Indie pop
- Years active: 2025-present
- Label: Drag City
- Spinoff of: Kamikaze Palm Tree
- Members: Dylan Hadley, Cole Berliner
- Website: sharpiesmile.com

Sharpie Smile (formerly known as Kamikaze Palm Tree) is an American indie pop duo consisting of Dylan Hadley and Cole Berliner. The duo are currently signed to Drag City.

== History ==
Dylan Hadley and Cole Berliner were originally in the psych rock band Kamikaze Palm Tree, before they opted to change the band's name. The name originates from a Kamikaze Palm Tree song. The duo released their first single under the name "Sharpie Smile" in 2025 titled "Love or Worship". In April 2025, the duo announced their debut album under the name Sharpie Smile called The Staircase, alongside a single titled "The Slide", The duo released the title track from the album in May. The album was released on June 27, 2025. The album received positive reviews. and was named one of the "Best Albums of June 2025" by Our Culture Mag.

== Discography ==
Studio albums

- The Staircase (2025, Drag City)
