= 2013–14 Greenock Morton F.C. season =

Greenock Morton F.C.
2013–14 season
- Chairman: Douglas Rae
- Manager: Allan Moore (until 23 November); David Hopkin (Interim); Kenny Shiels (from 16 December)
- Championship: 10th (relegated)
- Scottish Cup: Fourth round (eliminated by Inverness Caledonian Thistle)
- League Cup: Quarter-final (eliminated by St Johnstone)
- Challenge Cup: First round (eliminated by Annan Athletic)
- Top goalscorer: League: Dougie Imrie (9); All: Dougie Imrie (11)
- Highest home attendance: League: 2,341 v Queen of the South; Cup: 2,619 v St Johnstone
- Lowest home attendance: League: 826 v Dumbarton; Cup: 918 v Montrose
- Average home league attendance: 1,686
Home colours	Away colours	Third colours

Season 2013–14 saw Greenock Morton compete in their seventh consecutive season in the second tier of Scottish football (now called the Scottish Championship), having finished 2nd in the 2012–13 season. Morton also competed in the Challenge Cup, Scottish League Cup and the Scottish Cup.

At the end of the season, they were relegated to Scottish League One for the 2014–15 season.

== Story of the season ==
=== May ===
Manager Allan Moore and his assistant Mark McNally agreed new one-year deals with the club, whilst experienced pros Martin Hardie and Colin McMenamin were released.

Nine players were offered new one-year deals but David Hutton, Kyle Wilkie and Peter Weatherson were released.

David O'Brien and Derek Gaston were the first to sign their new contracts. Archie Campbell was next to sign up for another season.

Stranraer striker Craig Malcolm rejected a contract offer as he preferred to stay part-time.

Peter MacDonald was offered a two-year deal by Dundee, and Partick Thistle spoke to Aidan Fulton about a possible move to Firhill.

Scott Taggart agreed a new one-year deal, and Aidan Fulton was offered a full-time deal to avoid him leaving for Partick.

Dumbarton midfielder Chris Turner rejected terms, as did winger Declan McDaid.

A friendly match was arranged to be played at Cappielow against League One side Rotherham United for 9 July 2013.

Morton signed Joe McKee who had been released by Bolton Wanderers, and Thomas O'Ware agreed his new contract.

Further friendlies were announced to be played at Cappielow, against St Johnstone and Sheffield United, with a date announced for the Renfrewshire Cup semi-final against Viewfield Rovers.

Aidan Fulton, David Verlaque, David McNeil and ten other trialists, reserves and U17 players were offered professional contracts with the club.

McNeil agreed to sign his contract with club, to follow in the footsteps of his father John McNeil.

Thomas O'Ware signed his new contract, as did Mark McLaughlin. Fulton also agreed to reject Partick Thistle and go full-time with Morton.

=== June ===
Albion Rovers winger David Crawford was invited to pre-season training.

Former JEF United Ichihara Chiba Reserves midfielder Ryan Hirooka was announced as being at the club on trial.

David Verlaque rejected the offer of a trial at Nottingham Forest to stay with Morton. 12 of the 13 youths offered full-time deals accepted them, with only Christopher McLaughlin opting to sign instead for Dundee United.

Chris Millar was brought in as a coach for the U15 side.

Morton signed ex-Hamilton Academical defender Jonathan Page on a free transfer.

On 19 June, the fixture lists were released with Morton facing Cowdenbeath at Cappielow on the opening day.

Morton rejected a £50,000 bid for Michael Tidser from Rotherham United, a second bid for £50k up front was later accepted.

Morton brought in three players to train with the squad for pre-season; Dougie Imrie, Marc Fitzpatrick and James Creaney.

Morton were drawn away to Annan Athletic in the Scottish Challenge Cup first round.

=== July ===
Tidser finally joined Rotherham United for £50,000, and signed a three-year contract with the club.

Before the friendly with Sheffield United, Morton signed French goalkeeper Nicolas Caraux on a one-year deal.

Morton also signed left wing-back Marc Fitzpatrick on a one-year deal.

Gambian forward Kabba-Modou Cham flew in from Belgium to sign a two-year deal with the club.

Morton were drawn away to East Fife in the first round of the Scottish League Cup.

Morton signed Dougie Imrie from local rivals St Mirren for one season, as well as former Blackburn Rovers youngster Reece Hands on a two-year deal.

Two more players signed up, Slovakian defenders Tomáš Peciar and Michal Habai.

Morton won the Renfrewshire Cup for the 52nd time, defeating St Mirren at St Mirren Park by four goals to two.

Morton were eliminated from the Challenge Cup, 1–0 by Annan Athletic, after a Peter Weatherson free-kick separated the two sides.

=== August ===
Morton progressed to the second round of the League Cup, after defeating East Fife 6–2 after extra time. As a seeded team, they were drawn at home to Montrose in the second round.

Morton announced their squad numbers for the 2013–14 season on 9 August.

The Reserve League fixture list was published on 23 August, with the development squad starting their campaign at Galabank.

Morton won two games in the League Cup for only the second time in 30 years as they defeated Montrose 4–0.

Morton were drawn away to Celtic in the League Cup third round.

Dylan McLaughlin and Ewan McLean were released.

=== September ===
It was announced that Cappielow would host the UEFA Youth League fixture between Celtic and Barcelona on 1 October.

Scottish champions Celtic were humbled as Morton progressed to the League Cup quarter final with a 1–0 away victory. Their reward was a home tie against St Johnstone.

Nicolas Caraux and Fouad Bachirou signed contract extensions to keep them at the club until the summer of 2015. Joe McKee also extended his contract. Stephen Stirling signed on again on a short-term deal until January 2014.

=== October ===
Morton signed former Rangers striker Nacho Novo on a short-term deal, until January 2014.

Craig Reid re-signed on 18 October on a short-term deal.

Morton were knocked out of the League Cup at the quarter-final stage by St Johnstone, and drawn against Inverness Caledonian Thistle in the fourth round of the Scottish Cup.

=== November ===
Jake Nicholson signed after leaving Spurs in the summer.

Allan Moore was sacked on 23 November 2013 after a 5–1 home defeat to Livingston. David Hopkin would take interim charge of the club, assisted by Derek Anderson.

In Hopkin's second match in charge of Morton (the first being a 2–1 defeat at Cliftonhill in November 2002), they were eliminated from the Scottish Cup after a 4–0 thrashing by Inverness.

=== December ===
Ex-Kilmarnock manager Kenny Shiels was appointed as the new Morton boss.

Nacho Novo was released on Christmas Eve. Mark McLaughlin also left the club on the same day.

Morton signed Barrie McKay on a month's loan from Rangers, as well as signing ex-Rangers defender Darren Cole on a contract until the end of the season.

A selection of trialists including Garry O'Connor and David Robertson played as Morton lost 1–0 to St Mirren at Parklea.

=== January ===
David Robertson signed, along with ex-Wigan Athletic youth defender Jamie McCormack.

Craig Reid, Jake Nicholson and Stephen Stirling were told they could leave the club at the end of their short-term contracts.

Having freed up some wages with the five releases thus far, Shiels signed former Scotland international Garry O'Connor.

Morton completed the signing of former Chelsea and Brighton full-back Ben Sampayo.

Development squad full-back Glenn Eadie was released by mutual consent after receiving limited playing time in the reserves this season.

Tomáš Peciar left the club while Celtic defender Stuart Findlay came in on loan to replace him. Derek Riordan was scheduled to train with Morton.

Jonathan Page was released, while former St Mirren striker Jack Smith signed for the development squad.

Riordan didn't appear at training so Kenny Shiels ended his interest in the player.

Michal Habai moved to Livingston on a free transfer.

Morton's home match against Queen of the South on 25 January was abandoned after a spectator collapsed from a suspected heart attack.

Barrie McKay's loan was extended until the end of the season.

Rowan Vine signed just before the transfer window shut, until the end of the season.

=== February ===
Kabba Cham was released from his two-year contract by mutual consent.

Tony Wallace joined Queen's Park on a month's loan.

Stuart Findlay became the first current Morton player to be selected for the Scotland U21 squad in many years. Fouad Bachirou also received his first call-up for the Comoros national football team, and after making his international debut he became the first Morton player to be capped since Paul Fenwick with Canada.

=== March ===
Both Findlay and Bachirou played 90 minutes for their respective international sides.

After returning from his loan spell, and playing one match for Morton, Tony Wallace again was loaned out to Queen's Park

=== April ===
Shiels signed English midfielder Oliver Emsden on amateur terms.

David Hopkin resigned as Morton's assistant manager on 23 April 2014.

== First team transfers ==
- From end of 2012–13 season, to last match of season 2013–14

=== In ===
Player	Last club	League	Fee
(Scotland) Joe McKee	(England) Bolton Wanderers	Football League Championship	Free
(Scotland) David McNeil	(Scotland) Kilmarnock	Scottish Premier League	Free
(England) Jonathan Page	(Scotland) Hamilton Academical	Scottish Football League First Division	Free
(France) Nicolas Caraux	(France) Lens	Ligue 2	Free
(Scotland) Marc Fitzpatrick	(Scotland) Queen of the South	Scottish Football League First Division	Free
(The Gambia) Kabba-Modou Cham	(Belgium) Sint-Truiden	Belgian Second Division	Free
(Scotland) Dougie Imrie	(Scotland) St Mirren	Scottish Premier League	Free
(England) Reece Hands	(England) Blackburn Rovers	Football League Championship	Free
(Slovakia) Tomáš Peciar	(Germany) Budissa Bautzen	NOFV-Oberliga Süd	Free
(Slovakia) Michal Habai	(Slovakia) FC Petržalka	3. Slovenská Futbalová Liga	Free
(Spain) Nacho Novo	(Spain) Huesca	Segunda División B	Free
(England) Jake Nicholson	(England) Tottenham Hotspur	Premier League	Free
(Scotland) Barrie McKay	(Scotland) Rangers	Scottish League One	Loan
(Scotland) Darren Cole	(Scotland) Rangers	Scottish League One	Free
(Scotland) David Robertson	(Scotland) St Johnstone	Scottish Premiership	Free
(Scotland) Jamie McCormack	(England) Wigan Athletic	Football League Championship	Free
(Scotland) Garry O'Connor	(Russia) Tom Tomsk	Russian Football Premier League	Free
(England) Ben Sampayo	(England) Chelmsford City	Conference South	Free
(Scotland) Stuart Findlay	(Scotland) Celtic	Scottish Premiership	Loan
(Scotland) Jack Smith	(Scotland) East Fife	Scottish League One	Free
(England) Rowan Vine	(Scotland) Hibernian	Scottish Premiership	Free
(England) Oliver Emsden	(Cyprus) APEP	Cypriot Second Division	Amateur

=== Out ===
Player	To	League	Fee
(Scotland) Martin Hardie	(Scotland) Airdrieonians	Scottish Football League Second Division	Free
(Scotland) Colin McMenamin	(England) Celtic Nation	Northern Football League Division One	Free
(England) Peter Weatherson	(Scotland) Annan Athletic	Scottish Football League Third Division	Free
(Scotland) Kyle Wilkie	(Scotland) Livingston	Scottish Football League First Division	Free
(Scotland) David Hutton	(Scotland) Ayr United	Scottish Football League Second Division	Free
(Scotland) Willie Dyer	(Scotland) Dundee	Scottish Football League First Division	Free
(Scotland) Peter MacDonald	(Scotland) Dundee	Scottish Football League First Division	Free
(Scotland) Declan McDaid	(Scotland) Partick Thistle	Scottish Premier League	Free
(Scotland) William Boyd	(Scotland) Largs Thistle	Scottish Junior Football West Premier League	Free
(Scotland) Euan Blair	(Scotland) Hurlford United	Scottish Junior Football West Premier League	Free
(Scotland) Michael Tidser	(England) Rotherham United	Football League One	£50,000
(Scotland) Scott Keogh	(Scotland) Largs Thistle	Scottish Junior Football West Premier League	Free
(Scotland) Martin Maguire	(Scotland) Albion Rovers	Scottish Football League Second Division	Free
(Scotland) Alan Frizzell	(Scotland) Port Glasgow Juniors	Scottish Junior Football Central Division Two	Free
(Scotland) Dylan McLaughlin	(Scotland) Largs Thistle	Scottish Junior Football West Premier League	Free
(Scotland) Ewan McLean	(Scotland) Rutherglen Glencairn	West of Scotland Super League First Division	Free
(Spain) Nacho Novo	(England) Carlisle United	Football League One	Free
(Scotland) Mark McLaughlin	(Scotland) Dumbarton	Scottish Championship	Free
(Scotland) Craig Reid	(Scotland) Motherwell	Scottish Premiership	Free
(England) Jake Nicholson	(England) AFC Wimbledon	Football League Two	Free
(Scotland) Stephen Stirling	(Scotland) Stranraer	Scottish League One	Free
(Scotland) Glenn Eadie	(Scotland) Dumbarton	Scottish Championship	Free
(Slovakia) Tomáš Peciar	(Sweden) Östersund	Superettan	Free
(England) Jonathan Page	(Scotland) Dunfermline Athletic	Scottish League One	Free
(Slovakia) Michal Habai	(Scotland) Livingston	Scottish Championship	Free
(The Gambia) Kabba-Modou Cham	(Malta) Mosta	Maltese Premier League	Free
(Scotland) Tony Wallace	(Scotland) Queen's Park	Scottish League Two	Loan
(Scotland) Tony Wallace	(Scotland) Queen's Park	Scottish League Two	Loan

== Squad (that played for first team) ==
Note: Flags indicate national team as defined under FIFA eligibility rules; some limited exceptions apply. Players may hold more than one non-FIFA nationality.

No.	Pos.	Nation	Player
1	GK	SCO	Derek Gaston
2	DF	SCO	Scott Taggart
3	DF	SCO	Marc Fitzpatrick
4	DF	SVK	Tomáš Peciar (released in January)
5	DF	ENG	Jonathan Page (released in January)
6	DF	SCO	Mark McLaughlin (released in December)
6	DF	SCO	Stuart Findlay (on loan from Celtic)
7	MF	SCO	Joe McKee
8	MF	SCO	Dougie Imrie
9	MF	SCO	Tony Wallace
10	FW	SCO	Archie Campbell
11	MF	SCO	David O'Brien
12	DF	SCO	Craig Reid (released in January)
14	MF	ENG	Reece Hands
15	FW	SCO	Garry O'Connor
16	MF	SCO	Stephen Stirling (released in January)
16	DF	ENG	Ben Sampayo
17	MF	ENG	Jake Nicholson (released in January)

No.	Pos.	Nation	Player
17	FW	SCO	Jack Smith
18	DF	SVK	Michal Habai (released in January)
18	MF	ENG	Rowan Vine
19	FW	SCO	Barrie McKay (on loan from Rangers)
20	FW	ESP	Nacho Novo (released in December)
21	MF	COM	Fouad Bachirou
22	DF	SCO	Thomas O'Ware
23	GK	FRA	Nicolas Caraux
24	DF	SCO	Craig Knight
25	MF	SCO	David Robertson
26	MF	SCO	Aidan Fulton
27	FW	SCO	David McNeil
28	MF	SCO	Mark Russell
32	FW	SCO	Aidan Ferris
36	FW	SCO	Jordan Cairnie
40	DF	SCO	Darren Cole
44	DF	SCO	Jamie McCormack
48	FW	GAM	Kabba-Modou Cham (released in February)

== Fixtures and results ==
Win Draw Loss Upcoming fixture

=== Friendlies ===
Date	Opponents	Stadium	Result F–A (Note: Morton scores first.)	Scorers	Attendance	Notes	Ref.
3 July 2013	Sheffield United	Cappielow Park, Greenock	0–1		709	Sheffield United scorer was Chris Porter from the penalty spot	
6 July 2013	Motherwell	Cappielow Park, Greenock	3–1	Kabba-Modou Cham Martin Murphy	Closed doors	Motherwell scorer was Fraser Kerr; Ex-Morton defender Craig Reid played as a trialist for Motherwell; Both Morton scorers played as trialists	
9 July 2013	Rotherham United	Cappielow Park, Greenock	0–0		667	Ex-Morton midfielder Michael Tidser played for Rotherham	
13 July 2013	St Johnstone	Cappielow Park, Greenock	0–1		1,014	Testimonial match for Peter Weatherson; St Johnstone scorer was Dave Mackay with a 25-yard free-kick Weatherson's two brothers played the last few minutes up-front for Morton; Ex-Morton midfielders Chris Millar and Patrick Cregg played for St Johnstone	
16 July 2013	Viewfield Rovers	Cappielow Park, Greenock	9–0	Archie Campbell; Jordan Cairnie; Joe McKee; Aidan Fulton; David Verlaque; David McNeil; Tony Wallace (pen.)	233	Renfrewshire Cup semi-final	
20 July 2013	St Mirren	St Mirren Park, Paisley	4–2	Kabba-Modou Cham Reece Hands; David O'Brien	3,703	Renfrewshire Cup final Ex-Morton players David van Zanten, Jason Naismith and Paul McGowan played for St Mirren; Morton win the trophy for the 52nd time St Mirren scorers were Paul McGowan and Gary Teale	
28 July 2013	Largs Thistle	Barrfields, Largs	4–3	Dylan McLaughlin; Jordan Cairnie; Ryan Hirooka; Cameron O'Neil		Testimonial match for Stephen Connick; Ex-Morton defender Creag Little played for Largs; As did ex-youths Craig Black, Kevin Struthers, Scott Keogh and William Boyd; Ryan Hirooka played as a trialist	
20 August 2013	Motherwell U20	Dalziel Park, Carfin	1–2	Kabba-Modou Cham	Public park	Nicolas Caraux saved a penalty	
17 September 2013	Kilmarnock	Broadwood Stadium, Cumbernauld	0–3		Closed door		
30 December 2013	St Mirren	Parklea Community Stadium, Port Glasgow	0–1		Closed door		
7 February 2014	Motherwell	Dalziel Park, Carfin	1–5	Thomas O'Ware	Public park		

=== Scottish Championship ===
- League position is after Morton game, not after round of games in case of postponements.

Date	Opponents	Stadium	Result F–A	Home events	Away events	Attendance	Points	League position	Referee	Ref.
10 August 2012	Cowdenbeath	Cappielow Park, Greenock	2–0	Reece Hands 27'; Archie Campbell 65'; Joe McKee (yellow card) 82'	Thomas O'Brien (yellow card) 36' (yellow card) 88' (red card); Kenny Adamson (yellow card) 58'	1,817	3	1st	Euan Norris	
17 August 2012	Falkirk	The Falkirk Stadium, Grangemouth	1–3	Jay Fulton (yellow card) 5'; Rory Loy 40', 45+1'; Philip Roberts 48'	Mark McLaughlin (yellow card) 67'; Reece Hands 90'	3,058	3	6th ▼	Craig Thomson	
24 August 2013	Dumbarton	Dumbarton Football Stadium, Dumbarton	1–3	Mitchel Megginson 18'; Colin Nish 42'; Steven McDougall 84'	Dougie Imrie 19' (pen.)	1,171	3	8th ▼	Willie Collum	
31 August 2013	Raith Rovers	Cappielow Park, Greenock	1–1	Tony Wallace (yellow card) 25'; Michal Habai (yellow card) 36'; Dougie Imrie 39' (pen.) (yellow card) 41'	Calum Elliot (yellow card) 39'; Kevin Moon (yellow card) 58'; Grant Anderson 78'; Liam Fox (yellow card) 83'	1,545	4	8th	Barry Cook	
14 September 2013	Livingston	Almondvale Stadium, Livingston	2–2	Simon Mensing 4'; Marc McNulty 14' (yellow card) 69'; Kyle Wilkie (yellow card) 17'; Coll Donaldson (yellow card) 49'; Burton O'Brien (yellow card) 78'	Reece Hands 34'; Kabba-Modou Cham 45+1'; Michal Habai (yellow card) 57'	1,077	5	8th	Andrew Dallas	
21 September 2013	Queen of the South	Cappielow Park, Greenock	0–2	Scott Taggart (yellow card) 57'; Reece Hands (penalty missed); Michal Habai (yellow card) 70'; Tony Wallace (yellow card) 90'	Iain Russell 45' (yellow card) 90'; Derek Lyle 59'; Derek Young (yellow card) 85'	1,826	5	9th ▼	Stephen Finnie	
28 September 2013	Dundee	Dens Park, Dundee	1–3	Peter MacDonald 47', 50'; Craig Beattie 71'	Tomáš Peciar 23'	3,870	5	10th ▼	Iain Brines	
5 October 2013	Alloa Athletic	Cappielow Park, Greenock	0–2	Dougie Imrie (yellow card) 55'; Fouad Bachirou (yellow card) 87'	Graeme Holmes 41'; Andy Kirk 48'; Declan McManus (yellow card) 75'	1,478	5	10th	Don Robertson	
12 October 2013	Hamilton Academical	Cappielow Park, Greenock	1–1	Michal Habai 69' (yellow card) 77'; Dougie Imrie (yellow card) 90+2'	Anthony Andreu 33'; Alex Neil (yellow card) 77'; Ziggy Gordon (yellow card) 90'	2,106	6	10th	Calum Murray	
19 October 2013	Cowdenbeath	Central Park, Cowdenbeath	1–5	Jordan Morton 2'; Kane Hemmings 4', 39', 79'; Jon Robertson (yellow card) 55'; Greg Stewart 72'	Dougie Imrie (yellow card) 14' (goal) 45+1'; Archie Campbell (yellow card) 80'; Joe McKee (yellow card) 82'	543	6	10th	Kevin Clancy	
26 October 2013	Raith Rovers	Stark's Park, Kirkcaldy	1–2	Kevin Moon 44'; Laurie Ellis (yellow card) 74'; Gordon Smith 90+3' (yellow card) 90+4'	Michal Habai (yellow card) 30'; Nacho Novo (yellow card) 48' (goal) 70'	1,569	6	10th	George Salmond	
9 November 2013	Dumbarton	Cappielow Park, Greenock	2–0	Mark McLaughlin 60'; Fouad Bachirou (yellow card) 65'; Tomáš Peciar 88'; Stephen Stirling (yellow card) 90'	Jordan Kirkpatrick (yellow card) 58'; Paul McGinn (yellow card) 63'; Scott Agnew (yellow card) 77'	1,687	9	10th	Stevie O'Reilly	
16 November 2013	Queen of the South	Palmerston Park, Dumfries	0–2	Gavin Reilly 6'; Ian McShane 18'; Kevin Holt (yellow card) 66'	Fouad Bachirou (yellow card) 55'; Tony Wallace (yellow card) 66'; Kabba-Modou Cham (yellow card) 71'	1,685	9	10th	Crawford Allan	
23 November 2013	Livingston	Cappielow Park, Greenock	1–5	Kabba-Modou Cham 26' (red card) 87'; Dougie Imrie (yellow card) 41'; Nacho Novo (yellow card) 81'	Marc McNulty; 6', 90+2' 64' (pen.); Andy Barrowman 28'; Martin Scott 37'; Simon Mensing (yellow card) 56'; Callum Fordyce (yellow card) 85'	1,460	9	10th	Greg Aitken	
7 December 2013	Dundee	Cappielow Park, Greenock	1–2	Jake Nicholson (yellow card) 28'; Dougie Imrie 59'; Tomáš Peciar (yellow card) 60'; Mark McLaughlin (yellow card) 73'	Craig Beattie 17'; Declan Gallagher 45'; Kevin McBride (yellow card) 89'	1,536	9	10th	Crawford Allan	
14 December 2013	Alloa Athletic	Recreation Park, Alloa	0–2	Jason Marr (yellow card) 28'; Andy Kirk 43'; Ben Gordon (yellow card) 59'; Stephen Simmons (yellow card) 77'; Declan McManus 85'	Fouad Bachirou (yellow card) 35'; Tomáš Peciar (yellow card) 39'; Jake Nicholson (yellow card) 59'	546	9	10th	Des Roache	
21 December 2013	Falkirk	Cappielow Park, Greenock	0–2	Dougie Imrie (yellow card) 60'; Aidan Ferris (yellow card) 72'	Kieran Duffie 51'; Conor McGrandles (yellow card) 59'; Rory Loy 69'	1,873	9	10th	Stephen Finnie	
28 December 2013	Hamilton Academical	New Douglas Park, Hamilton	0–1	Mickaël Antoine-Curier 24'; Grant Gillespie (yellow card) 90+1'; Ali Crawford (yellow card) 90+2'		1,472	9	10th	Iain Brines	
4 January 2014	Dumbarton	Dumbarton Football Stadium, Dumbarton	0–2	Mitchel Megginson (yellow card) 12'; Chris Turner (yellow card) 26'; Bryan Prunty 45+1' (pen.); Chris Kane 82'; Colin Nish (yellow card) 87'	Tomas Peciar (yellow card) 18'; Scott Taggart (yellow card) 45'	1,469	9	10th	Kevin Clancy	
11 January 2014	Raith Rovers	Cappielow Park, Greenock	0–0		Kevin Moon (yellow card) 87'	1,745	10	10th	Iain Brines	
18 January 2014	Livingston	Almondvale Stadium, Livingston	1–0		Dougie Imrie (yellow card) 41'; Barrie McKay 45+1'; David Robertson (yellow card) 48'	1,245	13	10th	George Salmond	
25 January 2014	Queen of the South	Cappielow Park, Greenock	A–A							
29 January 2014	Queen of the South	Cappielow Park, Greenock	1–1	Dougie Imrie (yellow card) 37'; Thomas O'Ware (yellow card) 59'; Archie Campbell 86'	Paul Burns (yellow card) 36'; Iain Russell 44' (red card) 51'; Chris Higgins (red card) 45+1'; Stephen McKenna (yellow card) 50'; Ian McShane (yellow card) 76'	2,341	14	10th	Euan Anderson	
1 February 2014	Falkirk	The Falkirk Stadium, Grangemouth	1–1	Rory Loy (penalty missed); Mark Millar 63' (pen.) (yellow card) 68'	Dougie Imrie 45+1'; Fouad Bachirou (yellow card) 82'	3,120	15	10th	John McKendrick	
15 February 2014	Cowdenbeath	Cappielow Park, Greenock	1–1	Stuart Findlay (yellow card) 64'; Archie Campbell 85'	John Armstrong 13'; Kenny Adamson (yellow card) 57'; James Fowler (yellow card) 88'	2,087	16	10th	Brian Colvin	
22 February 2014	Alloa Athletic	Cappielow Park, Greenock	0–1	Rowan Vine (yellow card) 28'; Stuart Findlay (yellow card) 48'; Dougie Imrie (red card) 90+2'	Ryan McCord 18'; Stephen Simmons (yellow card) 75'; Ben Gordon (yellow card) 82'	1,628	16	10th	John Beaton	
1 March 2014	Dundee	Dens Park, Dundee	0–2	Christian Nadé 13' (yellow card) 58'; Willie Dyer (yellow card) 57'; Declan Gallagher (yellow card) 75'; Peter MacDonald 86'; Martin Boyle (yellow card) 90+1'	Fouad Bachirou (yellow card) 67'; Marc Fitzpatrick (yellow card) 82'	4,488	16	10th	George Salmond	
15 March 2014	Raith Rovers	Stark's Park, Kirkcaldy	1–2	Callum Booth (yellow card) 27'; Greig Spence 68' (pen.) 80'	Darren Cole (yellow card) 3'; Dougie Imrie (yellow card) 13'; Rowan Vine 18'; Aidan Fulton (yellow card) 53'; Archie Campbell (yellow card) 67'	1,308	16	10th	Craig Charleston	
22 March 2014	Hamilton Academical	Cappielow Park, Greenock	3–4	Rowan Vine 23'; Dougie Imrie (yellow card) 45+2'; Marc Fitzpatrick 60'; Garry O'Connor 84'	Jason Scotland 13'; Darian MacKinnon (yellow card) 45+3'; Louis Longridge 54', 64'; Mickaël Antoine-Curier 87'	1,345	16	10th	Calum Murray	
25 March 2014	Cowdenbeath	Central Park, Cowdenbeath	0–3	Kyle Miller 6', 70'; Greg Stewart 63'	Rowan Vine (red card) 53'; Fouad Bachirou (yellow card) 56'; Marc Fitzpatrick (yellow card) 69'	318	16	10th	John Beaton	
29 March 2014	Queen of the South	Palmerston Park, Dumfries	0–3	Chris Higgins 9'; Chris Mitchell (yellow card) 34'; Derek Lyle 49'; Mark Kerr (yellow card) 66'; Gavin Reilly 81'		1,487	16	10th	Iain Brines	
1 April 2014	Dumbarton	Cappielow Park, Greenock	3–0	Rowan Vine 14'; Thomas O'Ware 38' (yellow card) 59'; Barrie McKay 57'	Mitchel Megginson (yellow card) 56'; Garry Fleming (yellow card) 74'	826	19	10th	Alan Muir	
5 April 2014	Livingston	Cappielow Park, Greenock	2–0	Dougie Imrie 14'; Barrie McKay 45+2'	Simon Mensing (yellow card) 51'; Nejc Mevlja (yellow card) 77'; Kyle Wilkie (yellow card) 86'	1,009	22	10th	Craig Charleston	
12 April 2014	Alloa Athletic	Recreation Park, Alloa	0–2	Kevin Cawley 15'; Ryan McCord 53'; Jonathan Tiffoney (yellow card) 60'; Darryl Meggatt (yellow card) 84'		615	22	10th RELEGATED	John McKendrick	
19 April 2014	Dundee	Cappielow Park, Greenock	1–0	Stuart Findlay (yellow card) 74'; Dougie Imrie 78'	Iain Davidson (yellow card) 32'; Gavin Rae (yellow card) 75'	2,117	25	10th	Mat Northcroft	
26 April 2014	Falkirk	Cappielow Park, Greenock	1–1	Thomas O'Ware (yellow card) 45'; Rowan Vine 60'; Darren Cole (yellow card) 63'	Conor McGrandles 41'; Mark Millar (yellow card) 69'	1,921	26	10th	Craig Thomson	
3 May 2014	Hamilton Academical	New Douglas Park, Hamilton	2–10	Mickaël Antoine-Curier 5', 56', 78', 86'; Anthony Andreu 8', 32' 45' (pen.); Louis Longridge 35'; Michael Devlin 68'	Dougie Imrie 22', 73'; Rowan Vine (yellow card) 45' (penalty missed); Scott Taggart (yellow card) 62'; Stuart Findlay 85' (o.g.)	2,034	26	10th	Steven McLean	

=== Scottish Cup ===
Date	Round	Opponents	Stadium	Result F–A	Home events	Away events	Attendance	Referee	Ref.
30 November 2013	Round 4	Inverness Caledonian Thistle	Caledonian Stadium, Inverness	0–4	Nick Ross 45+2' (pen.); Ross Draper (yellow card) 59'; Josh Meekings (yellow card) 63'; Billy McKay 71', 90'; Aaron Doran 90+3' (pen.)	Craig Reid (yellow card) 45'; Nacho Novo (yellow card) 45+1'; Scott Taggart (red card) 90+1'	TBC	Don Robertson	

=== Scottish League Cup ===
Date	Round	Opponents	Stadium	Result F–A	Home events	Away events	Attendance	Referee	Ref.
3 August 2012	Round 1	East Fife	Bayview Stadium, Methil	6–2 (a.e.t.)	Johnny Stewart (yellow card) 64'; Liam Buchanan 75', 82'; Craig Johnstone (red card) 101'	Mark McLaughlin 55'; Michal Habai 70' (yellow card) 72'; David McNeil 92' (yellow card) 96'; Archie Campbell 97', 119'; Dougie Imrie 102'; Scott Taggart (yellow card) 112'	727	Craig Charleston	
27 August 2013	Round 2	Montrose	Cappielow Park, Greenock	4–0	Kabba-Modou Cham 50'; Marc Fitzpatrick 69'; Reece Hands (yellow card) 84' (goal) 90+1'; Aidan Fulton 90+2'	David Gray (yellow card) 60'	918	Andrew Dallas	
24 September 2013	Round 3	Celtic	Celtic Park, Glasgow	1–0 (a.e.t.)	Charlie Mulgrew (yellow card) 78'	Tony Wallace (yellow card) 87'; Dougie Imrie 97' (pen.); Archie Campbell (yellow card) 99'	15,709	Bobby Madden	
30 October 2013	Quarter-final	St Johnstone	Cappielow Park, Greenock	0–1	Michal Habai (yellow card) 28'; Joe McKee (yellow card) 48'; Nacho Novo (yellow card) 90+3'; Dougie Imrie (yellow card) 90+5'	Nigel Hasselbaink (yellow card) 25'; Brian Easton (yellow card) 40'; Gary McDonald 90+4'	2,619	John McKendrick	

=== Scottish Challenge Cup ===
Date	Round	Opponents	Stadium	Result F–A	Home events	Away events	Attendance	Referee	Ref.
27 July 2013	Round 1 (South-West)	Annan Athletic	Galabank, Annan	0–1	Peter Weatherson 71'	Dougie Imrie (yellow card) 44'	732	Crawford Allan	

=== Reserves ===
Date	Opponents	Stadium	Result F–A	Morton goalscorers	Ref.
11 July 2012	Stranraer	Lochinch Police Club, Pollok Country Park, Glasgow	2–7	Aidan Fulton; Trialist	
2 September 2013	Alloa Athletic (Reserve League)	Recreation Park, Alloa	0–3		
9 September 2013	Stenhousemuir (Reserve League)	Cappielow Park, Greenock	3–1	Archie Campbell; David McNeil (pen.)	
2 October 2013	East Stirlingshire (Reserve League)	University of Stirling, Bridge of Allan	3–1	Stephen Stirling (pen.); Aidan Ferris; David McNeil (pen.)	
8 October 2013	Dundee (Reserve League)	Dens Park, Dundee	3–3	Michal Habai; Archie Campbell	
14 October 2013	Berwick Rangers (Reserve League)	Cappielow Park, Greenock	4–1	Aidan Ferris	
20 October 2013	Fraserburgh (SFA Youth Cup R3)	Cappielow Park, Greenock	2–0	David McNeil (pen.)	
22 October 2013	Annan Athletic (Reserve League)	Galabank, Annan	0–6		
31 October 2013	Rangers U18	Rangers Training Centre, Auchenhowie	3–2	Aidan Fulton; David McNeil	
5 November 2013	Raith Rovers (Reserve League)	Stark's Park, Kirkcaldy	2–2	Cameron O'Neil; Archie Campbell	
11 November 2013	Queen of the South (Reserve League)	Parklea Community Stadium, Port Glasgow	3–2	Kabba-Modou Cham; David McNeil; Aidan Ferris	
18 November 2013	Livingston (Reserve League)	Albyn Park, Broxburn	2–1	Kabba-Modou Cham	
26 November 2013	East Fife (Reserve League)	Parklea Community Stadium, Port Glasgow	2–1	David McNeil; Aidan Ferris	
1 December 2013	Ayr United (SFA Youth Cup R4)	Cappielow Park, Greenock	3–2	David McNeil; John Tennant	
3 December 2013	Cowdenbeath (Reserve League)	Central Park, Cowdenbeath	2–0	Archie Campbell; Aidan Fulton	
10 December 2013	Ayr United (Reserve League)	Cappielow Park, Greenock	2–0	David McNeil; Thomas O'Ware	
17 December 2013	Airdrieonians (Reserve League)	Excelsior Stadium, Airdrie	4–0	Derek Gaston; Aidan Ferris; Reece Hands	
23 December 2013	Queen's Park (Reserve League)	Toryglen Regional Football Centre, Toryglen, Glasgow	0–2		
17 February 2014	Ayr United (Reserve League Cup)	Somerset Park, Ayr	7–1	Archie Campbell (pen.); Tony Wallace; Nicky Jamieson; Jack Smith	
25 February 2014	Livingston (Reserve League Cup)	Parklea Community Stadium, Port Glasgow	2–0	Joe McKee (pen.); Dougie Imrie	
2 March 2014	Kilmarnock (SFA Youth Cup QF)	Rugby Park, Kilmarnock	1–2	Aidan Fulton	
6 March 2014	Airdrieonians (Reserve League Cup)	Excelsior Stadium, Airdrie	3–2	Thomas O'Ware; Rowan Vine	
18 March 2014	Queen of the South (Reserve League Cup)	Parklea Community Stadium, Port Glasgow	0–2		
27 March 2014	Annan Athletic (Reserve League Cup)	Galabank, Annan	3–1	David McNeil; Cameron O'Neil; Aidan Ferris	
15 April 2014	Queen's Park (Reserve League Cup)	Cappielow Park, Greenock	0–3		
28 April 2014	Cowdenbeath (Reserve League Cup SF)	Central Park, Cowdenbeath	1–2	Jordan Cairnie	

== League table ==
Pos	Team	Pld	W	D	L	GF	GA	GD	Pts	Promotion, qualification or relegation
6	Livingston	36	13	7	16	51	56	−5	46	
7	Raith Rovers	36	11	9	16	48	61	−13	42	
8	Alloa Athletic	36	11	7	18	34	51	−17	40	
9	Cowdenbeath (O)	36	11	7	18	50	72	−22	40	Qualification for the Championship play-offs
10	Greenock Morton (R)	36	6	8	22	32	71	−39	26	Relegation to League One

Source: Soccerway
Rules for classification: 1) points; 2) goal difference; 3) number of goals scored.
(O) Play-off winners; (R) Relegated

== Player statistics ==
As of 20 May 2014

=== All competitions ===
- Additional positions played listed, if have started in more than one this season.

Position	Player	Starts	Subs	Unused subs	Goals	Red cards (red card)	Yellow cards (yellow card)
MF	(Comoros) Fouad Bachirou	41	0	0	0	0	7
FW	(Scotland) Jordan Cairnie	0	1	4	0	0	0
FW	(Scotland) Archie Campbell	11	24	7	5	0	3
GK	(France) Nicolas Caraux	24	1	15	0	0	0
FW	(The Gambia) Kabba-Modou Cham	11	2	3	3	1	1
DF	(Scotland) Darren Cole	18	0	0	0	0	2
FW	(Scotland) Aidan Ferris	0	1	0	0	0	1
DF	(Scotland) Stuart Findlay (on loan from Celtic)	14	0	0	0	0	3
DF / MF	(Scotland) Marc Fitzpatrick	35	0	1	2	0	2
MF	(Scotland) Aidan Fulton	2	15	7	1	0	1
GK	(Scotland) Derek Gaston	18	1	22	0	0	0
DF / MF / FW	(Slovakia) Michal Habai	19	1	4	2	0	7
MF	(England) Reece Hands	13	1	2	4	0	1
MF / FW	(Scotland) Dougie Imrie	39	0	1	11	1	12
DF	(Scotland) Luke Irvine	0	0	1	0	0	0
DF	(Scotland) Nicky Jamieson	0	0	1	0	0	0
MF	(Scotland) Craig Knight	2	1	6	0	0	0
DF	(Scotland) Jamie McCormack	10	0	7	0	0	0
GK	(Scotland) Lewis McIntyre	0	0	3	0	0	0
MF	(Scotland) Barrie McKay (on loan from Rangers)	14	4	0	3	0	0
MF	(Scotland) Joe McKee	9	9	3	0	0	3
DF	(Scotland) Mark McLaughlin	15	1	5	2	0	2
FW	(Scotland) David McNeil	2	10	12	1	0	1
MF	(England) Jake Nicholson	4	1	0	0	0	2
FW	(Spain) Nacho Novo	10	0	1	1	0	4
MF	(Scotland) David O'Brien	6	4	3	0	0	0
FW	(Scotland) Garry O'Connor	9	2	3	1	0	0
MF	(Scotland) Cameron O'Neil	0	0	2	0	0	0
DF	(Scotland) Thomas O'Ware	11	1	8	1	0	3
DF	(England) Jonathan Page	12	3	4	0	0	0
DF	(Slovakia) Tomáš Peciar	18	2	2	2	0	3
DF	(Scotland) Craig Reid	11	0	0	0	0	1
MF	(Scotland) David Robertson	14	2	1	0	0	1
DF / MF	(Scotland) Mark Russell	5	8	10	0	0	0
DF	(England) Ben Sampayo	0	2	2	0	0	0
FW	(Scotland) Jack Smith	0	2	3	0	0	0
MF	(Scotland) Stephen Stirling	9	4	1	0	0	1
DF / MF	(Scotland) Scott Taggart	34	0	3	0	1	4
MF	(Scotland) David Verlaque	0	0	7	0	0	0
MF / FW	(England) Rowan Vine	12	0	0	4	1	2
MF	(Scotland) Tony Wallace	10	9	6	0	0	4
