= 2013–14 Scottish League Cup =

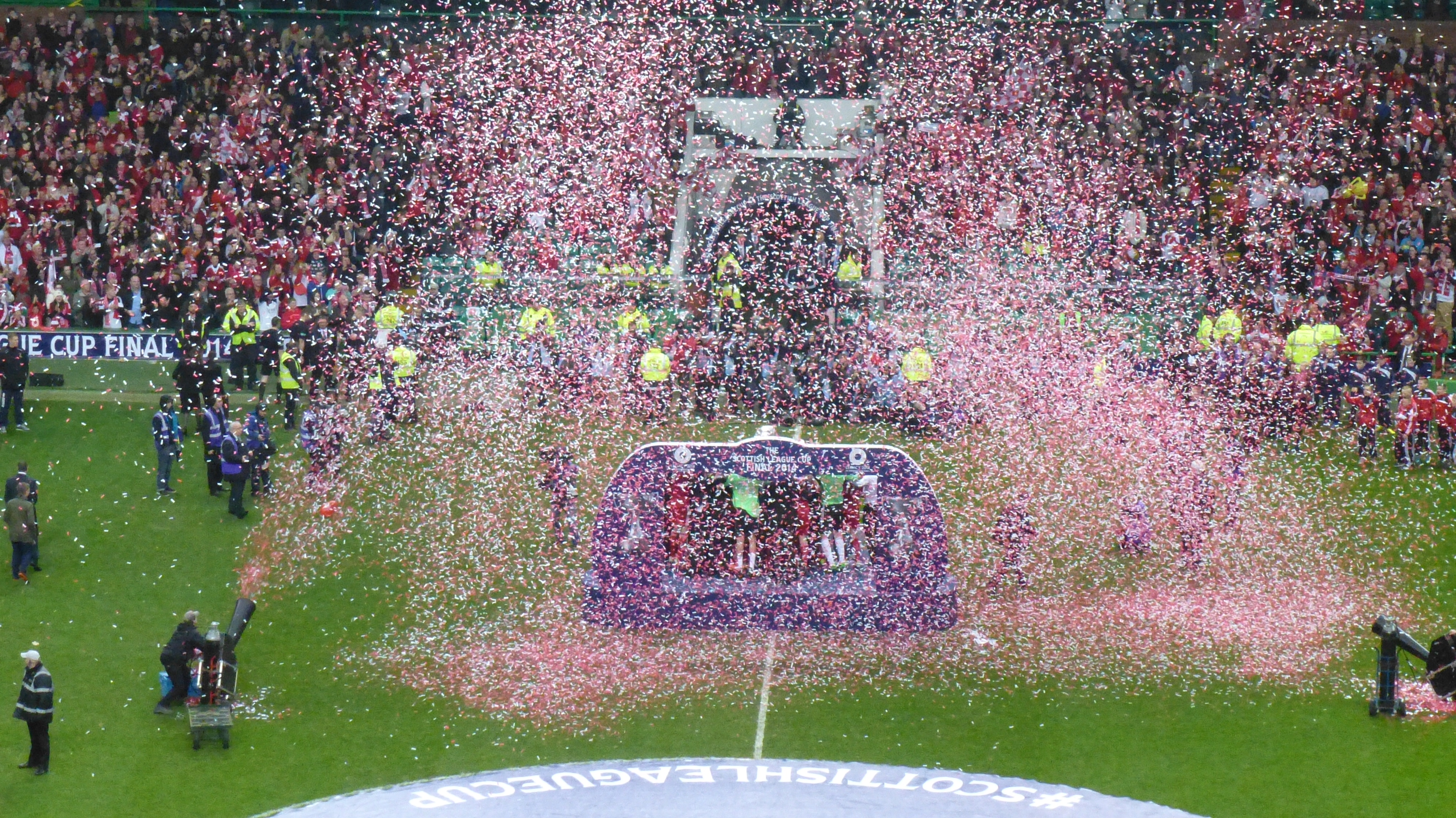
- Aberdeen celebrate winning the cup final

Tournament details
- Country: Scotland
- Dates: 3 August 2013 – 16 March 2014
- Teams: 42

Final positions
- Champions: Aberdeen
- Runners-up: Inverness CT

The 2013–14 Scottish League Cup was the 68th season of Scotland's second-most prestigious football knockout competition.

== Format ==
The competition is a single elimination knock-out competition. In each round, fixtures are determined by random draw, with the first to third rounds seeded according to last season's league positions (higher 50% of finishers drawn v lower 50% of finishers, alternating which is at home with each tie drawn).

Fixtures are played to a finish, with extra time and then penalties used in the event of draws. The competition is open to all clubs in the Scottish Professional Football League. Clubs involved in European competitions are given a bye to the third round in order to avoid congestion of fixtures.

- First round: All 30 sides from the previous season's Scottish Football League enter including Partick Thistle.
- Second round: The 15 winners of the first round are joined by last season's seven lowest placed teams in the SPL not in European competition, including relegated Dundee.
- Third round: The 11 winners of the second round are joined by the four SPL sides participating in European competition (Celtic, Motherwell, St Johnstone & Hibernian) and the highest placed SPL finisher not in European competition (Inverness Caledonian Thistle).
- Quarter-finals: The 8 winners of the third round play.
- Semi-finals: The 4 winners of the quarter-finals play.
- Final: The 2 winners of the semi-finals play.

== Schedule ==
- First round: Saturday 3 & Tuesday 6 August 2013
- Second round: Tuesday 27 & Wednesday 28 August 2013
- Third round: Tuesday 24 & Wednesday 25 September 2013
- Quarter-finals: Tuesday 29 & Wednesday 30 October 2013
- Semi-finals: Saturday 1 & Sunday 2 February 2014
- Final: Sunday 16 March 2014

== Fixtures & Results ==
=== First round ===
The first round draw was conducted at Hampden Park on Friday 12 July 2013 at 2:30pm.

3 August 2013	Falkirk	3–0	Clyde	Recreation Park
15:00	Alston 73'; Roberts 79'; Grant 81'	BBC Sport		Referee: Brian Colvin

3 August 2013	East Fife	2–6 (a.e.t.)	Greenock Morton	Bayview Stadium
15:00	Buchanan 85', 90+1'; Johnstone (red card) 102'	BBC Sport	McLaughlin 55'; Habai 81'; McNeil 93'; Campbell 99', 119'; Imrie 104'	Referee: Craig Charleston

3 August 2013	Arbroath	0–1	Montrose	Gayfield Park
15:00		BBC Sport	Watson (red card) 58'; McCord 76'	Referee: Alan Muir

3 August 2013	Berwick Rangers	0–5	Cowdenbeath	Shielfield Park
15:00		BBC Sport	Hemmings 36', 38', 88'; Miller 49'; Stewart 73'	Attendance: 465; Referee: Crawford Allan

3 August 2013	Forfar Athletic	2–1 (a.e.t.)	Rangers	Station Park
15:00	Swankie 9', 115'	BBC Sport	Aird 84'	Attendance: 4,079; Referee: Calum Murray

3 August 2013	Stranraer	4–3	Brechin City	Stair Park
15:00	Borris 10'; Robertson 24'; Aitken 33' (pen.); McKenna 48'	BBC Sport	Donnelly 55', 83'; Barr 86'	Attendance: 291; Referee: Kevin Graham

3 August 2013	Stirling Albion	0–3	Hamilton Academical	Forthbank Stadium
15:00		BBC Sport	Keatings 32', 64'; Smith 41' (o.g.)	Attendance: 556; Referee: John McKendrick

3 August 2013	Dumbarton	1–0	Albion Rovers	Dumbarton Football Stadium
15:00	Gilhaney 42'	BBC Sport		Referee: Barry Cook

3 August 2013	East Stirlingshire	0–2	Dunfermline Athletic	Ochilview Park
15:00	Turner (yellow card) 61' (red card)	BBC Sport	Wallace 10' (pen.); Dargo 88'	Attendance: 1,043; Referee: Mat Northcroft

3 August 2013	Queen of the South	3–0	Annan Athletic	Palmerston Park
15:00	Lyle 59', 67', 69'	BBC Sport	Watson (red card) 58'	Attendance: 1,588; Referee: Paul Robertson

3 August 2013	Peterhead	0–2	Alloa Athletic	Balmoor Stadium
15:00		BBC Sport	McCord 52'; Andy Kirk 83'	Attendance: 429; Referee: David Somers

3 August 2013	Raith Rovers	6–0	Queen's Park	Stark's Park
15:00	Smith 15'; Cardle 34'; Elliot 57', 67'; Spence 70'; Vaughan 86'	BBC Sport	Capuano (yellow card) 62' (red card)	Attendance: 1,219; Referee: Stephen Finnie

3 August 2013	Elgin City	1–3	Livingston	Borough Briggs
15:00	Crighton 45+2'	BBC Sport	Scott 15'; Fordyce 39'; McNulty 62'	Attendance: 563; Referee: Don Robertson

3 August 2013	Airdrieonians	4–3	Stenhousemuir	Excelsior Stadium
15:00	Sinclair 33'; O'Neil (red card) 39'; Blockley 44'; O'Byrne 45+2'; Coult 77'	BBC Sport	Dickson 16'; Smith 24'; Malone (red card) 38'; McMillan 88'	Attendance: 647; Referee: Andrew Dallas

6 August 2013	Partick Thistle	2–1	Ayr United	Firhill Stadium
19:45	O'Donnell 13'; Balatoni 83'	BBC Sport	Shankland 89'	Attendance: 2,145; Referee: Iain Brines

=== Second round ===
The second round draw was conducted at Hampden Park on Wednesday 7 August 2013 at 2:30pm.

27 August 2013	Greenock Morton	4–0	Montrose	Cappielow Park
19:30	Cham 50'; Fitzpatrick 69'; Hands 90'; Fulton 90'	BBC Sport		Attendance: 918; Referee: Andrew Dallas

27 August 2013	Stranraer	3–2	Ross County	Stair Park
19:30	Winter 65'; Aitken 71' (pen.); Grehan 82'	BBC Sport	Brittain 45' (pen.); Mustafi 79'	Attendance: 215; Referee: Stephen Finnie

27 August 2013	Dundee	2–1 (a.e.t.)	Forfar Athletic	Dens Park
19:45	McAlister 51'; MacDonald 120'	BBC Sport	Campbell 43'	Attendance: 2027; Referee: Barry Cook

27 August 2013	Kilmarnock	0–1	Hamilton Academical	Rugby Park
19:45		BBC Sport	Antoine-Curier 42'	Attendance: 2,033; Referee: Calum Murray

27 August 2013	Airdrieonians	0–2	Livingston	Excelsior Stadium
19:45		BBC Sport	Barrowman 38'; Wilkie 67'	Attendance: 483; Referee: Greg Aitken

27 August 2013	Partick Thistle	3–1 (a.e.t.)	Cowdenbeath	Firhill Stadium
19:45	Elliott 92'; Lawless 103'; Muirhead 114' (pen.)	BBC Sport	Hemmings 93'	Attendance: 1,544; Referee: John McKendrick

27 August 2013	Queen of the South	2–1 (a.e.t.)	St Mirren	Palmerston Park
19:45	McKenna 103'; Paton 115'	BBC Sport	Thompson 95'	Attendance: 2,073; Referee: Craig Charleston

27 August 2013	Aberdeen	0–0 (a.e.t.) (6–5 p)	Alloa Athletic	Pittodrie Stadium
19:45		BBC Sport		Attendance: 4,897; Referee: Stevie O'Reilly
	Penalties
	McGinn (penalty scored); Low (penalty scored); Pawlett (penalty scored); Jack (penalty scored); Vernon (penalty scored); Reynolds (penalty scored)		Holmes (penalty scored); Ferns (penalty scored); McCord (penalty scored); Gordon (penalty scored); Young (penalty scored); Doyle (penalty missed)

27 August 2013	Raith Rovers	1–1 (a.e.t.) (4–5 p)	Heart of Midlothian	Stark's Park
19:45	Fox 50'	BBC Sport	Hamill 62' (pen.)	Attendance: 3,668; Referee: Brian Colvin
	Penalties
	Watson (penalty scored); Vaughan (penalty missed); Elliot (penalty scored); Booth (penalty scored); Fox (penalty missed); Thomson (penalty missed); Cardle (penalty scored); Callachan (penalty missed)		Wilson (penalty missed); Hamill (penalty scored); McGowan (penalty scored); Walker (penalty scored); McHattie (penalty missed); Holt (penalty missed); Smith (penalty scored); McKay (penalty scored)

27 August 2013	Falkirk	2–1	Dunfermline Athletic	Falkirk Stadium
19:45	Morris 19' (o.g.); Fulton 33'	BBC Sport	Moore 28'	Attendance: 3,663; Referee: Steven McLean

28 August 2013	Dumbarton	2–3	Dundee United	Dumbarton Football Stadium
19:45	Smith 34'; Megginson 87'	BBC Sport	Çiftçi 69', 89'; Gauld 77'	Attendance: 1,045; Referee: Alan Muir

=== Third round ===
The third round draw was conducted at Easter Road Stadium on Thursday 29 August 2013 at 11:30am.

24 September 2013	Hibernian	5–3	Stranraer	Easter Road
19:45	Craig 8', 47', 61' (pen.); Zoubir 34'; Rumsby 36' (o.g.)	BBC Sport	Longworth 3', 48'; Nelson 52' (o.g.)	Attendance: 6,431; Referee: Crawford Allan

24 September 2013	Dundee	0–1	Inverness Caledonian Thistle	Dens Park
19:45		BBC Sport	McKay 11'	Attendance: 1,682; Referee: Stephen Finnie

24 September 2013	Celtic	0–1 (a.e.t.)	Greenock Morton	Celtic Park
19:45		BBC Sport	Imrie 97' (pen.)	Referee: Bobby Madden

24 September 2013	Hamilton Academical	0–3	St Johnstone	New Douglas Park
19:45		BBC Sport	May 4', 90'; Edwards 86'	Attendance: 1,059; Referee: John Beaton

25 September 2013	Falkirk	0–5	Aberdeen	Falkirk Stadium
19:15		BBC Sport	Shaughnessy 23'; Smith 36'; Vernon 54', 55', 75' (pen.)	Attendance: 2,838; Referee: Steven McLean

25 September 2013	Livingston	1–2	Motherwell	Almondvale Stadium
19:45	Talbot (red card) 65'; Denholm 90'	BBC Sport	McHugh 16'; McFadden 73'	Attendance: 1,660; Referee: Brian Colvin

25 September 2013	Heart of Midlothian	3–3 (a.e.t.) (4–2 p)	Queen of the South	Tynecastle Stadium
19:45	McHattie 14'; Hamill 51' (pen.); Wilson 93'	BBC Sport	McGuffie 20'; Paton 62'; Higgins 115'	Attendance: 8,381; Referee: John McKendrick
	Penalties
	McGhee (penalty scored); Hamill (penalty missed); McGowan (penalty scored); B.King (penalty scored); Carrick (penalty scored)		Lyle (penalty scored); Mitchell (penalty missed); Paton (penalty missed); Dzierzawski (penalty scored)

25 September 2013	Dundee United	4–1	Partick Thistle	Tannadice Park
19:45	Goodwillie 33', 45', 90'; Dow 87'	BBC Sport	Elliott 89'	Attendance: 3,778; Referee: Calum Murray

=== Quarter-finals ===
The quarter-final draw was conducted at Hampden Park on Thursday 26 September 2013 at 3:00pm.

29 October 2013	Inverness Caledonian Thistle	2–1 (a.e.t.)	Dundee United	Caledonian Stadium
19:45	Warren 54'; Draper 120'	BBC Sport	Watson 5'; Çiftçi (red card) 42'	Attendance: 2,133; Referee: Kevin Clancy

30 October 2013	Hibernian	0–1	Heart of Midlothian	Easter Road
19:00	McPake (red card) 83'	BBC Sport	Stevenson 34'	Attendance: 16,797; Referee: Willie Collum

30 October 2013	Greenock Morton	0–1	St Johnstone	Cappielow
19:30		BBC Sport	McDonald 90'	Attendance: 2,619; Referee: John McKendrick

30 October 2013	Motherwell	0–2	Aberdeen	Fir Park
19:45		BBC Sport	Shaughnessy (red card) 13'; Considine 83'; Hayes 90'	Attendance: 6,995; Referee: John Beaton

=== Semi-finals ===
The semi-final draw was conducted at Hampden Park on Thursday 31 October 2013 at 3:00pm.

1 February 2014	Aberdeen	4–0	St Johnstone	Tynecastle
15:00	Hayes 3', 79'; Pawlett 32'; Rooney 63'	BBC Sport		Attendance: 16,761; Referee: Bobby Madden

2 February 2014	Heart of Midlothian	2–2 (a.e.t.) (2–4 p)	Inverness Caledonian Thistle	Easter Road
12:15	Hamill 68', 70'	Report	Tansey 54'; Ross 90+5'	Attendance: 12,762; Referee: John Beaton
	Penalties
	McCallum (penalty missed); Carrick (penalty scored); Hamill (penalty missed); Robinson (penalty scored)		(penalty missed) Shinnie; (penalty scored) McKay; (penalty scored) Ross; (penalty scored) Tansey; (penalty scored) Draper

=== Final ===
16 March 2014	Aberdeen	0–0 (a.e.t.) (4–2 p)	Inverness CT	Celtic Park, Glasgow
14:30		Report		Attendance: 51,143; Referee: Steven McLean
	Penalties
	Robson (penalty scored); Low (penalty scored); Vernon (penalty scored); Rooney (penalty scored)		(penalty missed) McKay; (penalty missed) Tansey; (penalty scored) Ross; (penalty scored) Doran
