= Stephen Stirling (footballer) =

Scottish footballer

Personal information
- Date of birth: 5 January 1990 (age 36)
- Place of birth: Paisley, Scotland
- Position: Midfielder

Youth career
- 2007–2009: Rangers

Senior career*
Years	Team	Apps	(Gls)
2009–2011	Rangers	0	(0)
2011	→ Stirling Albion (loan)	10	(2)
2011–2012	Stranraer	26	(12)
2012–2013	Greenock Morton	7	(1)
2013–2014	Greenock Morton	11	(0)
2014–2015	Stranraer	40	(5)
2015–2017	Stenhousemuir	43	(2)
2018–2019	Neilston		
2022–	Renfrew		

International career
2007–2009	Scotland U19	9	(5)
- * Club domestic league appearances and goals

Stephen Stirling (born 5 January 1990) is a Scottish footballer who plays for Neilston.

Stirling started his career with Rangers, spending a loan spell at Stirling Albion, before being released and dropping out the senior game for a short time, then returning with Stranraer. He has also had two spells at Greenock Morton.

== Club career ==
Born in Paisley, Stirling joined Stirling Albion in the 2011 January transfer window until the end of the season. On 7 May 2011 he scored his first league goals, when he scored twice as Stirling ended a 25-match winless streak with victory over Morton on the final day of the season.

After leaving Rangers in 2011, Stirling dropped out of the senior game for a short time playing amateur football in Paisley, before returning to senior football with Stranraer. After scoring 12 goals in 26 league matches, Stirling signed a pre-contract agreement with First Division side Greenock Morton. Stirling scored his first league goal for Morton when he drove in the only goal in a 1–0 victory over Raith Rovers. Stirling missed the rest of the 2012–13 season injured with a broken leg sustained in a league match against Partick Thistle. With him being out of contract in the summer of 2013, Stirling was given the summer to prove he had recovered from his injury by Allan Moore.

After recovering from his leg break, Stirling was given a short-term deal in September 2013. In January 2014, he was released from his contract and returned to his former club Stranraer in January 2014. After eighteen months with the Scottish League One side, Stirling was released from his contract with the side. Shortly after leaving Stranraer, Stirling signed for fellow League One side Stenhousemuir on a one-year contract.

== International career ==
Stirling has represented Scotland at Under-19 international level, playing in the 2009 UEFA U19 European Championship Elite Round.

In total he received nine caps at U19 level, scoring five goals.

== Career statistics ==
Appearances and goals by club, season and competition
Club	Season	League			Scottish Cup		League Cup		Other		Total	
Club	Season	Division	Apps	Goals	Apps	Goals	Apps	Goals	Apps	Goals	Apps	Goals
Stirling Albion (loan)	2010–11	Scottish First Division	10	2	0	0	0	0	0	0	10	2
Stranraer	2011–12	Scottish Third Division	26	12	0	0	0	0	0	0	26	12
Greenock Morton	2012–13	Scottish First Division	7	1	0	0	2	1	1 (Note: Appearance(s) in Scottish Challenge Cup)	0	10	2
Greenock Morton	2013–14	Scottish Championship	11	0	1	0	1	0	0	0	13	0
Greenock Morton	Total		18	1	1	0	3	1	1	0	23	2
Stranraer	2013–14	Scottish League One	11	1	0	0	0	0	2 (Note: Appearances in Scottish League One play-offs)	0	13	1
Stranraer	2014–15	Scottish League One	29	4	4	1	2	0	6 (Note: 4 appearances in Scottish Challenge Cup, 2 appearances in Scottish League One play-offs)	0	41	5
Stranraer	Total		40	5	4	1	2	0	8	0	54	4
Stenhousemuir	2015–16	Scottish League One	31	1	1	0	1	0	3	3	36	4
Stenhousemuir	2016–17	Scottish League One	12	1	0	0	3	0	2	0	17	1
Stenhousemuir	Total		43	2	1	0	4	0	5	3	53	5
Career total			137	22	6	1	9	1	14	3	166	27
