= Tomáš Peciar =

Slovak footballer

Personal information
- Full name: Tomáš Peciar
- Date of birth: 10 June 1988 (age 38)
- Place of birth: Bojnice, Czechoslovakia
- Height: 1.93 m (6 ft 4 in)
- Position: Defender

Team information
- Current team: Andau
- Number: 78

Youth career
- HFK Prievidza
- SFM Senec

Senior career*
Years	Team	Apps	(Gls)
2008–2011	AS Trenčín	54	(4)
2009–2010	→ Omniworld (loan)	0	(0)
2011	→ Viktoria Žižkov (loan)	1	(0)
2012	Baník Ružiná	?	(?)
2012–2013	Budissa Bautzen	11	(1)
2013	→ Baník Ružiná (loan)	?	(?)
2013–2014	Greenock Morton	17	(2)
2014–2015	Östersund	21	(1)
2016	Frýdek-Místek	?	(?)
2016–2017	FK Poprad	6	(1)
2017–2018	Kremser SC	?	(?)
2018–	Andau	?	(?)

International career^{‡}
2009	Slovakia U21	2	(0)
- * Club domestic league appearances and goals as of 11 August 2018 ‡ National team caps and goals as of 11 August 2018

Tomáš Peciar (born 10 June 1988 in Bojnice) is a Slovak football central defender who currently plays for FC Andau in the Austrian 2. Landesliga (fifth tier).

== Career ==
He played one match in the Gambrinus Liga for Viktoria Žižkov. In July 2013, Peciar left Budissa Bautzen to sign for Greenock Morton. Peciar left Morton in January 2014 as his fiancée did not wish to move to Scotland, and signed with Östersund in Sweden.

== See also ==
- Greenock Morton F.C. season 2013–14
