= Darren Cole =

Scottish footballer

Personal information
- Date of birth: 3 January 1992 (age 34)
- Place of birth: Edinburgh, Scotland
- Height: 1.89 m (6 ft 2 1/2 in)
- Position: Defender

Senior career*
Years	Team	Apps	(Gls)
2010–2013	Rangers	3	(0)
2012	→ Partick Thistle (loan)	6	(0)
2013–2014	Greenock Morton	18	(0)
2015–2016	Livingston	28	(0)
2016–2017	Broxburn Athletic	28	(1)
2017–2021	Derry City	93	(7)
2021–2023	Glentoran	7	(0)
2022-2023	→ Dungannon Swifts (loan)	2	(0)
2023-2024	Coleraine	15	(1)

International career
2007–2008	Scotland U16	6	(0)
2008–2009	Scotland U17	13	(0)
2009–2010	Scotland U19	7	(0)
2011	Scotland U21	2	(0)
- * Club domestic league appearances and goals as of 1 October 2023

Darren Cole (born 3 January 1992) is a Scottish footballer who plays as a defender. He has previously played for Rangers, Partick Thistle, Greenock Morton, Livingston, Derry City, as well as with several clubs in the NIFL Premiership.

== Club career ==
=== Rangers ===
Cole signed a two-year contract extension with Rangers on 2 December 2010 and made his first-team debut five days later against Turkish side Bursaspor in Rangers' final 2010–11 UEFA Champions League group match, which ended 1–1. Cole's performance was praised by manager Walter Smith.

Cole did not feature in the Rangers first team under Ally McCoist during the 2011–12 season. He was loaned to Partick Thistle in early January.

Cole suffered ankle ligament damage in January 2013, which was expected to rule him out for the remainder of the 2012–13 season. He did make an appearance in the final game of the season, against Berwick Rangers. Cole had his contract with Rangers terminated on 28 August 2013, after he failed to report for a reserve team friendly game with junior club Cambuslang Rangers.

=== Greenock Morton ===
On 27 December 2013, Cole signed for Greenock Morton until the end of the season. He left Morton in the summer of 2014 after just six months at the club.

=== Livingston ===
On 20 February 2015, Cole signed for Scottish Championship club Livingston until the end of the 2014–15 season. After impressing in his first season at Livingston, he not only won a new contract, but also was named captain for the season 2015–16. Following the club's relegation to League One, Cole was released from his contract on 15 July 2016.

=== Broxburn Athletic ===
In August 2016, Cole signed a one-year contract with Junior Super League club Broxburn Athletic. He was a regular in the team, appearing 28 times for the Albyn Park club, scoring one goal.

Cole's missed out on playing in the 2017 Fife and Lothians Cup Final against Tranent Juniors, as his side lost 1–0, at New Victoria Park, Newtongrange.

=== Derry City ===
In June 2017 Cole signed a six-month contract with League of Ireland Premier Division club Derry City. On the 16 September, Cole scored in the 2018 League of Ireland Cup Final in a 3–1 win over League of Ireland First Division side Cobh Ramblers. He signed a new contract with the club in February 2019.

=== Glentoran ===
Cole signed for Glentoran in December 2021. The defender signed for Dungannon Swifts on loan in August 2022.

== International career ==
Cole has represented Scotland at various age levels.

== Career statistics ==
As of 5 October 2021

Appearances and goals by club, season and competition
Club	Season	League			National Cup (Note: Includes Scottish Cup & FAI Cup)		League Cup (Note: Includes Scottish League Cup & League of Ireland Cup)		Europe		Other		Total	
Club	Season	Division	Apps	Goals	Apps	Goals	Apps	Goals	Apps	Goals	Apps	Goals	Apps	Goals
Rangers	2010–11	Scottish Premiership	0	0	0	0	0	0	1 (Note: Appearances in UEFA Champions League)	0	—		1	0
Rangers	2011–12	Scottish Premiership	0	0	—		0	0	0	0	—		0	0
Partick Thistle (loan)	2011–12	Scottish Championship	6	0	0	0	—		—		—		6	0
Rangers	2012–13	Scottish League Two	3	0	1	0	0	0	—		0 (Note: Appearances in Scottish Challenge Cup)	0	4	0
Rangers	2013–14	Scottish League One	0	0	—		0	0	—		0	0	0	0
Rangers	Rangers Total		3	0	1	0	0	0	1	0	0	0	5	0
Greenock Morton	2013–14	Scottish Championship	18	0	0	0	0	0	—		0	0	18	0
Livingston	2014–15	Scottish Championship	9	0	0	0	0	0	—		1	0	10	0
Livingston	2015–16	Scottish Championship	20	0	0	0	2	0	—		3 (Note: 2 appearances in Scottish Championship play-offs & 1 appearance in Scottish Challenge Cup)	0	25	0
Livingston	Livingston Total		29	0	0	0	2	0	—		4	0	35	0
Broxburn Athletic	2016–17	Scottish Junior Super League	28	1	0	0	—		—		2 (Note: Appearances in Scottish Junior Cup)	0	30	1
Derry City	2017	League of Ireland Premier Division	12	1	1	0	—		—		—		13	1
Derry City	2018	League of Ireland Premier Division	32	2	3	0	3	1	2 (Note: Appearances in UEFA Europa League)	0	—		40	3
Derry City	2019	League of Ireland Premier Division	25	3	2	0	1	0	—		—		28	3
Derry City	2020	League of Ireland Premier Division	9	1	1	0	—		1	0	—		11	1
Derry City	2021	League of Ireland Premier Division	14	0	1	0	—		—		—		15	0
Derry City	Derry City Total		92	7	8	0	4	1	3	0	—		107	8
Career total			176	8	9	0	6	1	4	0	6	0	201	9

== Honours ==
Rangers

- Scottish League Two: 2012–13

Derry City

- League of Ireland Cup: 2018
