= Lewis Hawke =

Scottish footballer

Personal information
- Date of birth: 22 October 1993 (age 33)
- Place of birth: Kirkcaldy, Scotland
- Height: 1.85 m (6 ft 1 in)
- Position: Striker

Youth career
- 2001–2007: Everton B.C.
- 2007–2011: Linwood Rangers B.C.
- 2011–2012: Greenock Morton
- 2013–2016: Furman Paladins

Senior career*
Years	Team	Apps	(Gls)
2012–2013	Greenock Morton	7	(2)
2013	Annan Athletic	6	(0)
2017–2018	Bulleen Lions	15	(8)
2018–2019	Queen's Park	30	(6)
2019–2020	Stirling Albion	6	(0)
2020–2021	Montrose	6	(0)
- * Club domestic league appearances and goals

Lewis Hawke (born 22 October 1993) is a Scottish former footballer.

He has previously played for Furman Paladins, Annan Athletic, Bulleen Lions, Queen's Park and Stirling Albion.

Hawke started his career at Greenock Morton and is the son of their former striker (and later Chief Executive) Warren Hawke.

== Career ==
After playing as a youngster for Linwood Rangers, Hawke signed for Greenock Morton where his father was a legend.

He was rewarded for his great form with the under-19s (16 goals in his first ten games) when he made his debut at 18 as an injury time substitute on 14 January 2012, against Raith Rovers. On 5 May 2012, Hawke scored his first senior goal for Greenock Morton after coming on as a substitute, against the same opposition. with a bullet header from the edge of the 6-yard box.

In February 2013, Hawke was allowed to sign for Annan Athletic on a free transfer.

After three years in the USA on a scholarship with Furman Paladins, Hawke signed for Bulleen Lions in Australia.

After 18 months, he returned to Scotland to sign for amateur side Queen's Park in Scottish League Two in August 2018. He scored his first goal for Queen's Park in the penalty kicks victory over Welsh side TNS in the Scottish Challenge Cup in September 2018.

Following one season at Hampden, Hawke moved to League Two side Stirling Albion. He left Stirling to join Montrose in January 2020.

== Personal life ==
Hawke is the son of former Berwick Rangers, Morton, Queen of the South and Sunderland striker, Warren Hawke.

He was a ballboy at Cappielow whilst his father was playing for the club, before signing with Morton in 2011.

== Honours ==
Furman Paladins

- Southern Conference Championship (2): 2014, 2015

== See also ==
- Greenock Morton F.C. season 2011–12 | 2012–13
