= Dylan McLaughlin =

Scottish footballer

Personal information
- Date of birth: 19 February 1995 (age 31)
- Place of birth: Greenock, Scotland
- Height: 5 ft 7 in (1.70 m)
- Position: Striker

Team information
- Current team: Port Glasgow

Youth career
- Partick Thistle
- Greenock Morton

Senior career*
Years	Team	Apps	(Gls)
2013	Greenock Morton	1	(0)
2013–2015	Largs Thistle	?	(?)
2015–	Port Glasgow	?	(?)
- * Club domestic league appearances and goals as of 13:15, 22 February 2016 (UTC)

Dylan McLaughlin (born 19 February 1995 in Greenock) is a Scottish footballer who plays for junior side Port Glasgow.

He started his senior career with Greenock Morton in the Scottish Football League First Division.

== Career ==
McLaughlin made his senior debut at the age of 18, as a substitute against Falkirk on 4 May 2013.

He was released in August 2013, along with Ewan McLean. In September, he signed for Largs Thistle, managed by Morton youth coach Sandy MacLean.

After a spell at Largs Thistle, McLaughlin is now playing for Port Glasgow.

== See also ==
- Greenock Morton F.C. season 2012-13
