= Thomas O'Ware =

Scottish footballer and manager

Personal information
- Date of birth: 20 March 1993 (age 33)
- Place of birth: Irvine, Scotland
- Positions: Defender; midfielder

Youth career
- 2003–2008: Rangers
- 2008–2010: Kilmarnock
- 2010–2011: Bonnyton Thistle

Senior career*
Years	Team	Apps	(Gls)
2011–2018	Greenock Morton	174	(19)
2018–2021	Partick Thistle	23	(1)
2021–2026	Kelty Hearts	108	(5)

International career
2011	Scotland U18		

Managerial career
- 2025–2026: Kelty Hearts
- * Club domestic league appearances and goals as of 4 May 2026

Thomas O'Ware (born 20 March 1993) is a Scottish professional footballer manager and player, who most recently managed Scottish League Two club Kelty Hearts. O'Ware, who plays as a defender, has previously played for Greenock Morton and Partick Thistle.

== Early life ==
Born in Irvine, North Ayrshire, Troon resident O'Ware attended Queen Margaret Academy in Ayr.

== Playing career ==
=== Youth ===
After beginning his career with hometown team Troon Thistle boys club, O'Ware spent five years in the Rangers youth system at Murray Park, then a further two at Kilmarnock. He then signed for youth side Bonnyton Thistle, where he was part of the team that won the Under-19 Scottish Cup final.

=== Morton ===
O'Ware joined Greenock Morton in 2011. He made his début at left back in a Scottish Cup tie against Deveronvale on 19 November 2011. O'Ware also had a trial at EFL Championship side Middlesbrough. He broke into the Morton team at left back due to an injury to Ross Forsyth. In January 2012, O'Ware suffered a stress fracture to his tibia making him miss at least a month of Morton's season. O'Ware agreed one-year extensions with Morton in 2013, 2014 and 2015.

In April 2016, O'Ware's good form resulted in him being awarded a two-year contract extension with the club. He won the Scottish Championship Player of the Month award for October 2016 and was twice named in the Scottish Championship Team of the Year in successive seasons. He also finished season 2016/17 as Europe's top scoring defender with 11 goals.

This form brought him to the attention of a host of Scottish Premiership clubs, and he was linked with a move to his boyhood heroes Celtic in the summer of 2017, as Brendan Rodgers looked to solidify his back line.

After the sacking of manager Jim Duffy in May 2018, O'Ware left the club seeking "a new challenge". Thomas featured at full-back, centre-back, centre midfield, and occasionally as a striker during his seven seasons at Cappielow.

=== Partick Thistle ===
O'Ware signed a two-year contract with Partick Thistle in June 2018. He scored his first goal for the Jags on 14 August 2018, opening the scoring in a 5–0 win at Stranraer in the Scottish Challenge Cup. On 25 August 2018, O'Ware was substituted four minutes into the game against Dundee United due to a knee injury, and it was later revealed that he would miss the remainder of the season as a result. O'Ware scored his first league goal for Thistle in the final game of the decade, scoring the winner against his former side Greenock Morton in a 2–1 away win. O'Ware signed a two-year contract extension with Thistle in January 2020.

=== Kelty Hearts ===
After leaving Partick Thistle on 29 July 2021, O'Ware joined newly-promoted Scottish League Two side Kelty Hearts on 30 July 2021 ahead of the 2021-22 campaign.

=== International ===
O'Ware represented Scotland at schoolboy level in 2011.

== Coaching ==
During his playing career, O'Ware began his coaching career by working with the Greenock Morton academy. After rupturing his ACL at Partick Thistle, O'Ware helped out with the coaching staff under then manager Gary Caldwell, and spent matchdays in the dugout as part of the non-playing staff.

O'Ware was appointed as Head Coach for the Troon F.C. Development Team in August 2020, who will be competing in the Lowland Development League (West) in season 2020–21. In November 2021, O'Ware joined the coaching staff at Rangers, coaching the club's under-16 team. In May 2023, O'Ware was appointed the new head coach of Queen's Park's development squad, known as Young Queen's Park.

He was appointed player/manager of Kelty Hearts in May 2025, having previously filled the role twice on a caretaker basis. he left on 19th September 2026

== Career statistics ==
As of matches played 4 May 2024

Appearances and goals by club, season and competition
Club	Season	League			Scottish Cup		League Cup		Other		Total	
Club	Season	Division	Apps	Goals	Apps	Goals	Apps	Goals	Apps	Goals	Apps	Goals
Greenock Morton	2011–12	Scottish Division One	14	0	2	0	0	0	0	0	16	0
Greenock Morton	2012–13	Scottish Division One	14	0	1	0	0	0	0	0	15	0
Greenock Morton	2013–14	Scottish Championship	11	1	1	0	0	0	0	0	12	1
Greenock Morton	2014–15	Scottish League One	34	4	3	0	2	0	3 (Note: Appearance(s) in the Scottish Challenge Cup)	1	42	5
Greenock Morton	2015–16	Scottish Championship	33	4	4	1	3	0	1	0	41	5
Greenock Morton	2016–17	Scottish Championship	35	6	3	2	7	2	3 (Note: One appearance in the Scottish Challenge Cup; two appearances and a goal in the Premiership play-offs)	1	48	12
Greenock Morton	2017–18	Scottish Championship	33	4	3	0	0	0	1	0	37	4
Greenock Morton	Total		174	19	17	3	12	2	8	2	211	26
Partick Thistle	2018–19	Scottish Championship	3	0	0	0	4	1	1	0	8	1
Partick Thistle	2019–20	Scottish Championship	20	1	2	0	5	0	4	0	31	1
Partick Thistle	2020–21	Scottish League One	0	0	0	0	0	0	0	0	0	0
Partick Thistle	2021-22	Scottish Championship	-		-		1	0	-		1	0
Partick Thistle	Total		23	1	2	0	10	1	5	0	40	2
Kelty Hearts	2021-22	Scottish League Two	28	1	3	1	-		0	0	31	2
Kelty Hearts	2022-23	Scottish League One	23	2	1	0	2	0	3	0	29	2
Kelty Hearts	2023-24	Scottish League One	13	1	0	0	3	0	1	0	17	1
Kelty Hearts	Total		64	4	4	1	5	0	4	0	77	5
Career total			261	24	23	4	27	3	17	2	328	33

=== Managerial Record ===
As of match played 19 September 2026

Managerial record by team and tenure
Team	Nat	From	To	Record					Ref.
Team	Nat	From	To	G	W	D	L	Win %	Ref.
Kelty Hearts	(Scotland)	11 April 2025	19 September 2026	68	19	16	33	27.94	
Career Total				68	19	16	33	27.94	—

== Honours ==
=== Club ===
Bonnyton Thistle

- Under-19 Scottish Cup: 2010–11

Greenock Morton

- Scottish League One: 2014–15

Kelty Hearts

- Scottish League Two: 2021-22

=== Individual ===
- Scottish Championship Player of the Month (1): October 2016
- 2016–17 Championship Team of the Year

== See also ==
- Greenock Morton F.C. season 2011–12 | 2012–13 | 2013–14 | 2014–15 | 2015–16
