= 2012–13 Greenock Morton F.C. season =

Greenock Morton
2012–13 season
- Chairman: Douglas Rae
- Manager: Allan Moore
- Scottish First Division: 2nd
- Scottish Cup: Fifth round (eliminated by Dundee)
- League Cup: Second round (eliminated by Aberdeen)
- Challenge Cup: Second round (eliminated by Queen of the South)
- Top goalscorer: League: Peter MacDonald (14); All: Peter MacDonald (15)
- Highest home attendance: League: 5,647 v Partick Thistle; Cup: 3,722 v St Mirren
- Lowest home attendance: League: 1,302 v Airdrie United; Cup: 746 v Albion Rovers
- Average home league attendance: 2,139
| Home colours | Away colours |

Season 2012–13 sees Greenock Morton compete in their sixth consecutive season in the First Division, having finished 8th in the 2011–12 season. Morton will also compete in the Challenge Cup, Scottish League Cup and the Scottish Cup.

== Story of the season ==
=== May ===
Paul Di Giacomo, Colin Stewart, Stuart McCaffrey, Darren McGeouch, Ross Forsyth, Grant Evans, Marc Smyth, Andy Jackson, Matthew McGinley and Iain Flannigan left the club after their contracts expired. Mark McLaughlin was the first to be brought in to begin the rebuilding process.

Joel Kasubandi and Creag Little were released while Fouad Bachirou stated he would not re-sign, Lewis Hawke and Martin Maguire were offered unpaid reserve contracts, and Andy Graham, Thomas O'Ware, Derek Young, Peter MacDonald, Archie Campbell and Peter Weatherson were asked to re-sign. Winger David O'Brien signed on for another season.

Willie Dyer signed on a free transfer from Raith Rovers, and Archie Campbell re-signed to the club.

Thomas O'Ware signed his new one-year contract, as did Peter Weatherson. Weatherson also agreed to take over as a coach of one of the club's youth sides.

Morton signed Scotland youth international Jason Naismith on loan from St Mirren. Former Scotland U19 international Stephen Stirling signed a pre-contract to join when his Stranraer contract expired in June.

London-based Danshell became the new sponsor of the Morton youth academy, in a £10,000 one-year deal.

=== June ===
David Hopkin was brought in to work as co-manager of the reserve side alongside Jonatan Johansson.

Morton made their fifth signing of the season, bringing in young Motherwell fullback Jordan Halsman on a free transfer.

Andy Graham rejected the club's contract offer and signed for Dumbarton, along with Ross Forsyth who has been released in May.

As they did last season, Morton brought in Graeme Jones as a sports scientist on a consultancy basis during the off-season period.

Morton were given a home tie in the first round of the Scottish League Challenge Cup against Albion Rovers.

Moore revealed that it was unlikely that captain Derek Young would re-sign with the club as "his kids and his wife are still up in Aberdeen".

The fixtures were released on 18 June, with Morton starting off at home to Livingston on 11 August.

Peter MacDonald signed a new one-year deal at the club, and goalkeeper Derek Gaston was signed as back-up to Alan Combe from Albion Rovers.

Ex-Dunfermline winger David Graham was signed on 20 June.

Morton agreed to send a side to Campbeltown to play the local amateur side, Campbeltown Pupils on 11 July.

A home friendly against Kilmarnock, and a closed doors game against Rapid București was organised.

Simon Mensing and Kyle Wilkie were taken on trial after being released by Hamilton Accies. Tony Wallace was also on trial, and Moore expected to sign him within the next week.

=== July ===
Tony Wallace completed his transfer to Cappielow for an undisclosed nominal fee.

Morton also have Craig Reid and Martin Hardie on trial, with the latter scoring in a 1-0 friendly win over Albion Rovers. Reid signed on 14 July.

Reid, Hardie and ex-Hibs fullback Scott Taggart signed for the club.

Morton were drawn away to East Stirlingshire in the first round of the Scottish Communities League Cup.

Kevin Rutkiewicz accepted a contract offer after playing in two trial matches for the club, and signed on 27 July.

Kyle Wilkie would sign up on 30 July 2012.

=== August ===
After dispatching of East Stirlingshire in the first round, Morton were given a home tie against Aberdeen in the second round.

Morton re-signed Fouad Bachirou on 17 August in time for him to make his second début against Hamilton Accies.

After only a couple of months, Johansson left the club to become U20 coach at Motherwell.

David Hutton signed a short-term deal at the club as understudy to Derek Gaston.

=== September ===
Alan Combe left to become a coach at Tynecastle with Hearts.

After not being able to play all season up to this point, Peter MacDonald was ruled out for a further six weeks due to having surgery on his plantar fascia.

Morton brought in ex-Celtic youth Liam Gormley on trial, and he scored in his first match against Largs Thistle.

With a 3–2 defeat of Airdrie United, Morton won four straight league games for the first time since the 1995–96 season.

=== October ===
Morton entered the Scottish Cup in the third round draw, and received an away tie at Albion Rovers who they defeated in the Challenge Cup earlier in the season.

Archie Campbell was awarded the SFL Young Player of the Month award and the Irn-Bru Ginger Boot as top scorer in the SFL for September.

=== November ===
Allan Moore received the October SFL Manager of the Month award, as Archie Campbell this time picked up the SFL Player of the Month award to add to his double of awards for September.

Morton defeated Albion Rovers in a replay to set up a fourth round tie against Highland Football League side Turriff United.

After eight consecutive wins, Morton's reserves ("the Bomb Squad") drew their first game of the season against Airdrie United.

=== December ===
Morton avoided the embarrassment of losing to Turriff when Peter Weatherson earned them a replay at Cappielow in the fourth round of the Scottish Cup. The replay was postponed at the first attempt due to a frozen pitch.

Morton won the replay 6–0 to set up a fifth round tie against Premier League Dundee.

Three youth players went out on loan to junior sides; Iain Beattie to Neilston Juniors, Martin Maguire to Port Glasgow and Euan Blair to Hurlford United.

=== January ===
Morton started the year badly, going down to a 3–0 defeat at home to strugglers Dumbarton.

David Hutton signed an extension to stay with the club to the end of the season.

Aidan Fulton went on a week-long trial at Motherwell's U20 side who are managed by former Morton coach Jonatan Johansson.

Allan Moore again won the dreaded SFL Manager of the Month award for December.

Morton signed Colin McMenamin with the help of local company McGill's Bus Services.

Youngster Declan McDaid received the first Morton call-up for many years when he was selected to represent Scotland Schools U18's at the 2013 Centenary Cup.

=== February ===
To allow him to get some first-team experience before heading to the United States for a scholarship, Lewis Hawke was released to allow him to sign on amateur terms at Annan Athletic.

Morton were hammered by Dundee in the Scottish Cup fifth round.

David Verlaque, whose father used to play for the club in the Scottish Premier Division, signed an amateur contract until the end of the season to play in the reserves.

Two Morton youth players received call-ups to try out for the Scotland U14 squad at the Excelsior Stadium in Airdrie; they were Lewis Strapp and Scott Miller.

Morton launched their social inclusion project, the Greenock Morton Community Trust, to get people in the local area involved in football at a young age.

=== March ===
As Morton suffered their first away league defeat since April 2012, Willie Dyer had to be taken from the field with a dislocated shoulder.

David Verlaque went on week long trial to Nottingham Forest.

Peter MacDonald won the player of the month for February.

=== April ===
Lewis Strapp rejected an approach from Celtic to stay at Morton's youth academy.

After Partick Thistle's victory on 20 April, they were confirmed as First Division champions; and Morton confirmed as league runners-up.

Michael Tidser was nominated for the PFA Scotland First Division Player of the Year award.

David Graham was released by Morton with two games still to go in the season.

Kevin Rutkiewicz and Jordan Halsman were released from their contracts to join Carolina RailHawks and Fram respectively.

=== May ===
Following a 4–1 defeat away at Falkirk, Morton finished the season in second place with 67 points. Peter MacDonald was the club's top scorer with 15 goals in all competitions.

== First team transfers ==
- From end of 2011–12 season, to last match of season 2012–13
  - Including unsigned trialists who appeared in first team matchday squads

=== In ===
| Player | From | League | Fee |
|---|---|---|---|
| (Scotland) Mark McLaughlin | (Scotland) Hamilton Academical | Scottish Football League First Division | Free |
| (Scotland) Willie Dyer | (Scotland) Raith Rovers | Scottish Football League First Division | Free |
| (Scotland) Jason Naismith | (Scotland) St Mirren | Scottish Premier League | Loan |
| (Scotland) Stephen Stirling | (Scotland) Stranraer | Scottish Football League Third Division | Free |
| (Scotland) Jordan Halsman | (Scotland) Motherwell | Scottish Premier League | Free |
| (Scotland) Derek Gaston | (Scotland) Albion Rovers | Scottish Football League Second Division | Free |
| (Scotland) David Graham | (Scotland) Dunfermline Athletic | Scottish Football League First Division | Free |
| (Scotland) Tony Wallace | (Scotland) Dumbarton | Scottish Football League First Division | Nominal |
| (Scotland) Craig Reid | (Scotland) Queen of the South | Scottish Football League Second Division | Free |
| (Scotland) Martin Hardie | (Scotland) Dunfermline Athletic | Scottish Football League First Division | Free |
| (Scotland) Scott Taggart | (Scotland) Hibernian | Scottish Premier League | Free |
| (Scotland) Kevin Rutkiewicz | (Scotland) Dunfermline Athletic | Scottish Football League First Division | Free |
| (Scotland) Kyle Wilkie | (Scotland) Hamilton Academical | Scottish Football League First Division | Free |
| (England) Simon Mensing | (Scotland) Hamilton Academical | Scottish Football League First Division | Trial |
| (Scotland) David Hutton | (Scotland) Hamilton Academical | Scottish Football League First Division | Trial |
| (Scotland) David Hutton | (Scotland) Hamilton Academical | Scottish Football League First Division | Free |
| (Scotland) Liam Gormley | (Scotland) Celtic | Scottish Premier League | Trial |
| (Australia) Daniel Moss | (Australia) Western Australian National Training Centre | Football West State League Premier Division | Free |
| (Scotland) Colin McMenamin | (Scotland) Ross County | Scottish Premier League | Free |
| (Scotland) David Verlaque | (Scotland) Queen's Park | Scottish Football League Third Division | Free |
| (Scotland) Glenn Eadie | (Scotland) Celtic | Scottish Premier League | Free |

=== Out ===
| Player | To | League | Fee |
|---|---|---|---|
| (Scotland) Paul Di Giacomo | (Scotland) Airdrie United | Scottish Football League First Division | Free |
| (Scotland) Stuart McCaffrey | | | Retired |
| (Scotland) Creag Little | (Scotland) Largs Thistle | Scottish Junior Football West Division One | Free |
| (Scotland) Colin Stewart | (Qatar) Al-Khor Sports Club (coach) | Qatar Stars League | Free |
| (Scotland) Grant Evans | (Scotland) Airdrie United | Scottish Football League First Division | Free |
| (Scotland) Ross Forsyth | (Scotland) Dumbarton | Scottish Football League First Division | Free |
| (Northern Ireland) Marc Smyth | (Northern Ireland) Cliftonville | IFA Premiership | Free |
| (Republic of Ireland) Andy Jackson | (Scotland) Brechin City | Scottish Football League Second Division | Free |
| (Scotland) Darren McGeouch | (Scotland) Glasgow Perthshire | Scottish Junior Football West Division One | Free |
| (Scotland) Matthew McGinley | (Scotland) Albion Rovers | Scottish Football League Second Division | Free |
| (Scotland) Iain Flannigan | (Scotland) Falkirk | Scottish Football League First Division | Free |
| (Democratic Republic of the Congo) Joel Kasubandi | (Scotland) Vale of Clyde | Scottish Junior Football Central Division Two | Free |
| (Scotland) Conor Ramsay | (Scotland) Johnstone Burgh | Scottish Junior Football Central Division Two | Free |
| (Scotland) Andy Graham | (Scotland) Dumbarton | Scottish Football League First Division | Free |
| (Scotland) Derek Young | (Scotland) Queen of the South | Scottish Football League Second Division | Free |
| (England) Simon Mensing | (Scotland) Raith Rovers | Scottish Football League First Division | Free |
| (Scotland) Alan Combe | (Scotland) Heart of Midlothian (coach) | Scottish Premier League | Free |
| (Scotland) Liam Gormley | (Scotland) East Fife | Scottish Football League Second Division | Free |
| (Scotland) Iain Beattie | (Scotland) Neilston Juniors | Scottish Junior Football Central Division One | Loan |
| (Scotland) Martin Maguire | (Scotland) Port Glasgow | Scottish Junior Football Central Division One | Loan |
| (Scotland) Euan Blair | (Scotland) Hurlford United | Scottish Junior Football West Division One | Loan |
| (Scotland) Lewis Hawke | (Scotland) Annan Athletic | Scottish Football League Third Division | Free |
| (Scotland) David Graham | | | Free |
| (Scotland) Kevin Rutkiewicz | (United States) Carolina RailHawks | North American Soccer League | Free |
| (Scotland) Jordan Halsman | (Iceland) Fram Reyjavik | Úrvalsdeild | Free |

== Squad (that played for first team) ==
Note: Flags indicate national team as defined under FIFA eligibility rules; some limited exceptions apply. Players may hold more than one non-FIFA nationality.

| No. | Pos. | Nation | Player |
|---|---|---|---|
| — | GK | SCO | Derek Gaston |
| — | GK | SCO | David Hutton |
| — | DF | SCO | Willie Dyer |
| — | DF | SCO | Jordan Halsman |
| — | DF | SCO | Mark McLaughlin (Captain) |
| — | DF | ENG | Simon Mensing (trialist) |
| — | DF | SCO | Jason Naismith (on loan from St Mirren) |
| — | DF | SCO | Thomas O'Ware |
| — | DF | SCO | Craig Reid |
| — | DF | SCO | Kevin Rutkiewicz |
| — | DF | SCO | Scott Taggart |
| — | MF | FRA | Fouad Bachirou |
| — | MF | SCO | Aidan Fulton |
| — | MF | SCO | Martin Hardie |
| — | MF | SCO | Declan McDaid |

| No. | Pos. | Nation | Player |
|---|---|---|---|
| — | MF | SCO | Dylan McLaughlin |
| — | MF | SCO | Ewan McLean |
| — | MF | SCO | David O'Brien |
| — | MF | SCO | Stephen Stirling |
| — | MF | SCO | Michael Tidser (Vice Captain) |
| — | MF | SCO | Tony Wallace |
| — | MF | SCO | Kyle Wilkie |
| — | FW | SCO | Archie Campbell |
| — | FW | SCO | Liam Gormley (trialist) |
| — | FW | SCO | David Graham |
| — | FW | SCO | Lewis Hawke |
| — | FW | SCO | Peter MacDonald |
| — | FW | SCO | Colin McMenamin |
| — | FW | ENG | Peter Weatherson |

== Fixtures and results ==
Win Draw Loss Upcoming fixture

=== Friendlies ===
| Date | Opponents | Stadium | Result F – A | Scorers | Attendance | Notes |
|---|---|---|---|---|---|---|
| 3 July 2012 | (Romania) Rapid București | Grangemouth Athletics Stadium, Grangemouth | 2–5 | Peter Weatherson; Archie Campbell | TBC | Game open to public despite information to the contrary |
| 7 July 2012 | Albion Rovers | St. Andrew's High School, Coatbridge | 1–0 | Martin Hardie | TBC | Played on astroturf Martin Hardie played as a trialist |
| 11 July 2012 | Campbeltown Pupils | Kintyre Park, Campbeltown | 10–2 | Stephen Stirling Lewis Hawke; Jordan Halsman; Thomas O'Ware; Michael Tidser; Declan McDaid (pen.) | TBC | Opening of a new exhibit at Campbeltown museum |
| 12 July 2012 | (Romania) Concordia Chiajna | Cappielow Park, Greenock | 0–1 | | Closed doors | The second Romanian team to play at Cappielow |
| 16 July 2012 | Kilmarnock | Cappielow Park, Greenock | 4–1 | David O'Brien; Mark McLaughlin; Peter Weatherson (pen.); Jordan Halsman | 636 | Under-strength Kilmarnock side |
| 21 July 2012 | St Mirren | Cappielow Park, Greenock | 0–1 | Derek Gaston (Own goal) | 3,722 | Renfrewshire Cup Final; Goal claimed by Paul McGowan |
| 9 September 2012 | Largs Thistle | Barrfields Stadium, Largs | 4–1 | Liam Gormley; Archie Campbell (pen.); Tony Wallace; Aidan Fulton | TBC | To mark the opening of hosts' new 3G artificial pitch Liam Gormley played as a trialist |

=== Scottish Football League First Division ===
  - League position is after Morton game, not after round of games in case of postponements.

| Date | Opponents | Stadium | Result F – A | Home Events | Away Events | Attendance | Points | League Position | Referee |
|---|---|---|---|---|---|---|---|---|---|
| 11 August 2012 | Livingston | Cappielow Park, Greenock | 2–2 | Peter Weatherson 7'; Jason Naismith (yellow card) 41'; Jordan Halsman (yellow card) 77'; Tony Wallace 80' | Iain Russell; 25' (yellow card) 27'; Craig Barr (yellow card) 37'; Stefan Scougall 39' | 1,898 | 1 | 6th | Craig Charleston |
| 18 August 2012 | Hamilton Academical | New Douglas Park, Hamilton | 1–1 | Alex Neil (yellow card) 34' (yellow card) 45' (red card); Ali Crawford 81' | David O'Brien 15'; Michael Tidser (red card) 86' | 1,572 | 2 | 6th | Crawford Allan |
| 25 August 2012 | Falkirk | Cappielow Park, Greenock | 1–2 | Archie Campbell 31'; David O'Brien (yellow card) 54'; Scott Taggart (yellow card) 59'; David Graham (yellow card) 78' | Jay Fulton 9'; Kieran Duffie (yellow card) 21'; Lyle Taylor 39' | 1,756 | 2 | 7th ▼ | Craig Thomson |
| 1 September 2012 | Dumbarton | Cappielow Park, Greenock | 3–0 | Willie Dyer (yellow card) 16'; Archie Campbell; 43', 54' (pen.), 76' (penalty missed) | Bryan Prunty (yellow card) 57'; James Creaney (yellow card) 61'; Martin McNiff (yellow card) 88' | 1,602 | 5 | 6th ▲ | Bobby Madden |
| 15 September 2012 | Cowdenbeath | Central Park, Cowdenbeath | 4–3 | John Armstrong 40'; Colin Cameron (yellow card) 61'; Mark Ramsay 82'; Kenny Adamson (yellow card) 90'; Jamie Stevenson; 90' | Peter Weatherson; 12', 25'; Archie Campbell 46'; David O'Brien 54' | 611 | 8 | 5th ▲ | Stephen Finnie |
| 22 September 2012 | Raith Rovers | Cappielow Park, Greenock | 1–0 | Scott Taggart (yellow card) 29'; Stephen Stirling; 67' (yellow card) 90'; Willie Dyer (yellow card) 85' | Brian Graham (yellow card) 1'; Simon Mensing (yellow card) 80'; Dougie Hall (yellow card) 89' | 1,628 | 11 | 3rd ▲ | George Salmond |
| 29 September 2012 | Airdrie United | Excelsior Stadium, Airdrie | 3–2 | Cameron MacDonald; (yellow card) 11'; John Boyle; 37', 80' (yellow card) 62'; David Lilley (red card) 85'; Michael Hart (yellow card) 90' | Archie Campbell; 49', 79'; David O'Brien 68'; Jason Naismith (yellow card) 90' | 1,054 | 14 | 3rd | John McKendrick |
| 6 October 2012 | Partick Thistle | Cappielow Park, Greenock | 3–1 | Kevin Rutkiewicz; 14' (yellow card) 45'; Mark McLaughlin; 39'; Fouad Bachirou (yellow card) 66'; David O'Brien 86' | Steven Craig 20'; Hugh Murray; (yellow card) 37' (yellow card) 55' (red card); Paul Paton (yellow card) 67'; Stuart Bannigan (yellow card) 82' | 3,445 | 17 | 3rd | Des Roache |
| 20 October 2012 | Dunfermline Athletic | East End Park, Dunfermline | 2–2 | Ryan Wallace; (yellow card) 38' (goal) 87'; Jordan McMillan (yellow card) 78'; Stephen Husband; 82' (pen.) | Kevin Rutkiewicz (yellow card) 7'; Archie Campbell; 40', 76'; Willie Dyer (yellow card) 57'; David O'Brien (yellow card) 63'; Mark McLaughlin (yellow card) 82' | 3,511 | 18 | 3rd | Craig Charleston |
| 27 October 2012 | Livingston | Almondvale Stadium, Livingston | 2–2 | Iain Russell; 8', 79' (pen.); Keaghan Jacobs (yellow card) 53'; Craig Barr (yellow card) 82'; Callum Booth (yellow card) 89' | Michael Tidser (yellow card) 12'; Archie Campbell; 50', 55'; Mark McLaughlin (yellow card) 72' | 1,417 | 19 | 3rd | Mike Tumilty |
| 10 November 2012 | Hamilton Academical | Cappielow Park, Greenock | 0–1 | Tony Wallace (yellow card) 40'; Archie Campbell (yellow card) 54' | Stevie May 21'; Martin Canning (yellow card) 49'; Grant Gillespie (yellow card) 90' | 1,815 | 19 | 3rd | Paul Robertson |
| 17 November 2012 | Dumbarton | Dumbarton Football Stadium, Dumbarton | 5–1 | Jim Lister (yellow card) 52'; Garry Fleming (yellow card) 72'; Bryan Prunty 84' | Martin Hardie; 3' (pen.) 17'; Willie Dyer (yellow card) 15'; Peter Weatherson; 37', 61'; David Graham 54' | 1,188 | 22 | 3rd | Stevie O'Reilly |
| 24 November 2012 | Cowdenbeath | Cappielow Park, Greenock | 1–0 | Lewis Hawke 88' | Mark Ramsay (yellow card) 59' | 1,562 | 25 | 3rd | Craig Thomson |
| 8 December 2012 | Raith Rovers | Stark's Park, Kirkcaldy | 3–3 | Brian Graham; 23', 71' (yellow card) 42'; Greig Spence; 85' (yellow card) 86'; Eddie Malone (yellow card) 90' | Kevin Rutkiewicz 8'; Martin Hardie; (penalty missed) (yellow card) 67' (goal) 88'; Willie Dyer (yellow card) 44'; David O'Brien 65' | 1,375 | 26 | 3rd | Steven McLean |
| 15 December 2012 | Airdrie United | Cappielow Park, Greenock | 2–0 | Mark McLaughlin (yellow card) 28'; David Graham 43'; David O'Brien (yellow card) 45'; Martin Hardie 83' | Josh Watt (yellow card) 17'; Grant Evans (yellow card) 52' | 1,302 | 29 | 3rd | Brian Colvin |
| 26 December 2012 | Partick Thistle | Firhill Stadium, Glasgow | 2–1 | Steven Craig 28' (yellow card) 87'; Aaron Sinclair (yellow card) 57'; Ross Forbes (yellow card) 64' (yellow card) 70' (red card); Sean Welsh (yellow card) 89' | David Graham (yellow card) 4'; Martin Hardie 64' (yellow card) 79'; Scott Taggart 84' | 4,955 | 32 | 2nd ▲ | Bobby Madden |
| 29 December 2012 | Dunfermline Athletic | Cappielow Park, Greenock | 4–2 | Fouad Bachirou 44'; Michael Tidser 56', 89'; Peter Weatherson 61'; Craig Reid (yellow card) 70' | Callum Morris 9'; Ryan Wallace 77' (yellow card) 90'; Stephen Jordan (yellow card) 83'; Josh Falkingham (yellow card) 84' | 3,076 | 35 | 1st ▲ | John McKendrick |
| 2 January 2013 | Dumbarton | Cappielow Park, Greenock | 0–3 | | Garry Fleming 32'; Scott Agnew 39'; Steven McDougall (yellow card) 56'; Jim Lister (yellow card) 56'; Bryan Prunty 79' | 2,412 | 35 | 1st | John Beaton |
| 5 January 2013 | Cowdenbeath | Central Park, Cowdenbeath | 1–1 | Liam Caddis 37'; Joe Mbu (yellow card) 90' | Willie Dyer (yellow card) 13'; Peter MacDonald 51'; Kevin Rutkiewicz (yellow card) 74' | 647 | 36 | 2nd ▼ | Mike Tumilty |
| 12 January 2013 | Falkirk | Falkirk Stadium, Grangemouth | 1–0 | | Martin Hardie 64'; Fouad Bachirou (yellow card) 90' | 3,078 | 39 | 1st ▲ | Crawford Allan |
| 19 January 2013 | Livingston | Cappielow Park, Greenock | 2–1 | Martin Hardie 15'; Fouad Bachirou (yellow card) 29'; David Graham (yellow card) 60'; Peter MacDonald 68'; Scott Taggart (yellow card) 90' | Iain Russell 53'; Liam Fox (yellow card) 62'; Kevin McCann (yellow card) 85' | 1,913 | 42 | 1st | Stephen Finnie |
| 26 January 2013 | Raith Rovers | Cappielow Park, Greenock | 1–0 | Michael Tidser 53'; Martin Hardie (yellow card) 66' | | 2,006 | 45 | 1st | Kevin Clancy |
| 9 February 2013 | Airdrie United | Excelsior Stadium, Airdrie | 4–0 | Gregor Buchanan (yellow card) 38'; Marc Warren (yellow card) 45' (yellow card) 83' (red card); Ricki Lamie (red card) 89' | David O'Brien 24'; Colin McMenamin 44'; Peter MacDonald 52'; Kyle Wilkie 60' | 984 | 48 | 1st | Brian Colvin |
| 16 February 2013 | Partick Thistle | Cappielow Park, Greenock | 2–2 | Peter MacDonald 57', 80' (pen.) (yellow card) 85'; Willie Dyer (yellow card) 60' | Chris Erskine 9'; Steven Craig 47'; Paul Paton (yellow card) 75'; Hugh Murray; (yellow card) 80' (yellow card) 84' (red card) | 5,647 | 49 | 1st | Euan Norris |
| 23 February 2013 | Dunfermline Athletic | East End Park, Dunfermline | 4–1 | Chris Kane (yellow card) 23'; Andy Geggan (yellow card) 32'; Jordan McMillan (yellow card) 33'; Andy Dowie (yellow card) 33'; Andrew Barrowman (penalty missed); Ryan Wallace (yellow card) 57'; Callum Morris 82' | Peter MacDonald; 31' (pen.) 50'; Fouad Bachirou (yellow card) 43'; Martin Hardie (yellow card) 44'; Michael Tidser 46', 64' | 2,720 | 52 | 1st | Craig Charleston |
| 5 March 2013 | Hamilton Academical | New Douglas Park, Hamilton | 1–2 | Derek Gaston 35' (o.g.); Michael Devlin (yellow card) 55'; Ziggy Gordon 58'; Gary Fisher (yellow card) 85'; Andy Ryan (yellow card) 90' | David O'Brien 8'; Martin Hardie (yellow card) 43'; Kevin Rutkiewicz (yellow card) 44'; Thomas O'Ware (yellow card) 90' | 1,009 | 52 | 1st | Kevin Clancy |
| 9 March 2013 | Falkirk | Cappielow Park, Greenock | 2–0 | Archie Campbell 30'; Peter MacDonald 44' | | 1,962 | 55 | 1st | Calum Murray |
| 16 March 2013 | Dumbarton | Dumbarton Football Stadium, Dumbarton | 3–0 | Garry Fleming (yellow card) 25'; Alan Lithgow (yellow card) 76' | Michael Tidser 32' (yellow card) 35'; Martin Hardie 38'; Peter MacDonald 81' | 1,241 | 58 | 1st | Paul Robertson |
| 23 March 2013 | Cowdenbeath | Cappielow Park, Greenock | 4–2 | Peter MacDonald 51' (pen.) 54'; Scott Taggart 63'; Martin Hardie (yellow card) 66' (goal) 71' | Craig Moore 13'; Jamie Stevenson 40'; Dean Brett (yellow card) 50'; Sean McAllister (yellow card) 73' | 1,533 | 61 | 1st | Iain Brines |
| 30 March 2013 | Raith Rovers | Stark's Park, Kirkcaldy | 1–2 | Brian Graham 12'; Allan Walker (yellow card) 22'; Michael Tidser 38' (o.g.); Joe Hamill (yellow card) 56' | Craig Reid (yellow card) 59'; Kyle Wilkie 72'; Thomas O'Ware (yellow card) 75' | 1,529 | 61 | 2nd ▼ | Crawford Allan |
| 6 April 2013 | Airdrie United | Cappielow Park, Greenock | 5–2 | Peter MacDonald 5', 22', 60'; Colin McMenamin 69' (pen.); Marc Warren 85' (o.g.) | Steven Hetherington (yellow card) 42'; Ricki Lamie (yellow card) 52'; Grant Evans (yellow card) 69' (red card) 80'; Sean Lynch 70'; Alan Cook 73' | 1,772 | 64 | 2nd | George Salmond |
| 10 April 2013 | Partick Thistle | Firhill Stadium, Glasgow | 0–1 | James Craigen 41'; Aaron Sinclair (yellow card) 59' | Martin Hardie (yellow card) 66' | 8,875 | 64 | 2nd | Brian Colvin |
| 13 April 2013 | Dunfermline Athletic | Cappielow Park, Greenock | 0–1 | Kyle Wilkie (yellow card) 68' | Ryan Thomson 10'; Chris Kane (yellow card) 65' | 1,634 | 64 | 2nd | Euan Norris |
| 20 April 2013 | Livingston | Almondvale Stadium, Livingston | 2–0 | García Tena (yellow card) 28' | Archie Campbell 43'; Tony Wallace (yellow card) 49'; Kyle Wilkie 55' | 1,158 | 67 | 2nd | Craig Charleston |
| 27 April 2013 | Hamilton Academical | Cappielow Park, Greenock | 0–2 | Thomas O'Ware (yellow card) 67' | Stevie May 39', 55'; Martin Canning (yellow card) 42'; Andy Ryan (yellow card) 60'; Michael Devlin (yellow card) 77' | 1,541 | 67 | 2nd | Alan Muir |
| 4 May 2013 | Falkirk | Falkirk Stadium, Grangemouth | 1–4 | Craig Sibbald 60'; Lyle Taylor 64' (pen.); Kieran Duffie 79'; Sean Higgins 88' | Mark McLaughlin 27'; Craig Reid (yellow card) 62' | 3,179 | 67 | 2nd | Euan Anderson |

=== Scottish Cup ===
| Date | Round | Opponents | Stadium | Result F – A | Home Events | Away Events | Attendance | Referee |
|---|---|---|---|---|---|---|---|---|
| 3 November 2012 | Round 3 | Albion Rovers | Cliftonhill, Coatbridge | 1–1 | Simon Marriott (yellow card) 15'; Alan Reid (yellow card) 27'; Tony Stevenson 45' | Peter Weatherson 58' | 656 | Crawford Allan |
| 13 November 2012 | Round 3 replay | Albion Rovers | Cappielow Park, Greenock | 3–0 | Martin Hardie 51'; Michael Tidser 53', 73' | Peter Innes (yellow card) 68'; Tony Stevenson (yellow card) 71' | 746 | Crawford Allan |
| 1 December 2012 | Round 4 | Turriff United | The Haughs, Turriff | 1–1 | Mark Simpson 40'; Gary Davidson (yellow card) 79'; Cammy Bowden (red card) 89' | Peter Weatherson; 45' (yellow card) 74'; Craig Reid (red card) 88' | 824 | Gary Hilland |
| 17 December 2012 | Round 4 replay | Turriff United | Cappielow Park, Greenock | 6–0 | Mark McLaughlin (yellow card) 20'; Peter Weatherson 37', 82', 84'; Michael Tidser 45' (pen.) 67'; Peter MacDonald 77' | Christopher Herd (yellow card) 10' | 915 | Gary Hilland |
| 3 February 2013 | Round 5 | Dundee | Dens Park, Dundee | 1–5 | Jim McAlister 29'; Lewis Toshney 65'; Colin Nish 71'; John Baird 74'; Declan Gallagher 82' | Michael Tidser 31' | 3,336 | Bobby Madden |

=== Scottish League Cup ===
| Date | Round | Opponents | Stadium | Result F – A | Home Events | Away Events | Attendance | Referee |
|---|---|---|---|---|---|---|---|---|
| 5 August 2012 | Round 1 | East Stirlingshire | Ochilview Park, Larbert | 5–1 | Michael Herd 34'; Michael Hunter (yellow card) 53'; Kevin Turner (yellow card) 76'; Ricky Miller (yellow card) 85' | Mark McLaughlin 1' (yellow card) 56'; Peter Weatherson 11' (yellow card) 43'; Stephen Stirling 37'; Tony Wallace 67'; Michael Tidser 86' | 581 | John Beaton |
| 22 August 2012 | Round 2 | Aberdeen | Cappielow Park, Greenock | 0–2 (AET) | David O'Brien (yellow card) 13'; Mark McLaughlin (yellow card) 73'; Craig Reid (yellow card) 86' | Gavin Rae 109'; Scott Vernon 115' | 2,817 | Iain Brines |

=== Scottish Challenge Cup ===
| Date | Round | Opponents | Stadium | Result F – A | Home Events | Away Events | Attendance | Referee |
|---|---|---|---|---|---|---|---|---|
| 28 July 2012 | Round 1 (South-West) | Albion Rovers | Cappielow Park, Greenock | 2–0 | Tony Wallace 48'; David O'Brien 59' | Connor Stevenson (yellow card) 66'; Tony Stevenson (red card) 75'; Peter Innes (yellow card) 83' | 1,268 | John Beaton |
| 14 August 2012 | Round 2 (South-West) | Queen of the South | Cappielow Park, Greenock | 1–2 (AET) | Michael Tidser 38'; Stephen Stirling (yellow card) 44'; Peter Weatherson (penalty missed) | Stephen McKenna (yellow card) 39'; Mark Durnan 66'; Derek Lyle (yellow card) 78'; Nicky Clark 105' | 1,178 | George Salmond |

=== Reserves ===
| Date | Opponents | Stadium | Result F – A | Morton goalscorers |
|---|---|---|---|---|
| 21 July 2012 | Rutherglen Glencairn (James Glen Memorial Trophy Semi-final) | Valefield Park, Kilbirnie | 0–3 |
| 22 July 2012 | Kilbirnie Ladeside (James Glen Memorial Trophy 3rd/4th place play-off) | Valefield Park, Kilbirnie | 4–2 | Ewan McLean; Archie Campbell |
| 25 July 2012 | Port Glasgow | Parklea Community Stadium, Port Glasgow | 1–1 | Kyle Wilkie |
| 30 July 2012 | Glasgow University | Garscube Sports Complex, Bearsden | 6–1 | Thomas O'Ware; Declan McDaid; Jason Naismith; Raymond Lynch; Dylan McLaughlin; Lewis Hawke |
| 6 August 2012 | Queen's Park | Lesser Hampden, Glasgow | 1–3 | Lewis Hawke |
| TBC | Johnstone Burgh Boys Club U21s | Ralston Training Complex, Ralston | 2–1 | Jamie Logan; William Boyd |
| 20 August 2012 | Partick Thistle | Bellsdale Park, Beith | 2–4 | Dylan McLaughlin; William Boyd |
| 12 September 2012 | Ayr United (Reserve League) | Cappielow Park, Greenock | 4–0 | Stephen Stirling (pen.); Declan McDaid; Thomas O'Ware; Liam Gormley |
| 18 September 2012 | Raith Rovers (Reserve League) | Stark's Park, Kirkcaldy | 2–1 | Liam Gormley (pen.); Declan McDaid |
| 25 September 2012 | Dumbarton (Reserve League) | Dumbarton Football Stadium, Dumbarton | 3–1 | Liam Gormley; Kyle Wilkie; Tony Wallace |
| 8 October 2012 | Livingston (Reserve League) | Cappielow Park, Greenock | 2–1 | Own goal Daniel Moss |
| 16 October 2012 | Rangers (Reserve League) | Murray Park, Milngavie | 3–1 | Dylan McLaughlin; Lewis Hawke; Aidan Fulton |
| 23 October 2012 | Annan Athletic (Reserve League) | Cappielow Park, Greenock | 4–0 | Thomas O'Ware; Lewis Hawke; Kyle Wilkie; Jordan Halsman |
| 31 October 2012 | East Fife (Reserve League) | Bayview Stadium, Methil | 4–2 | Kyle Wilkie; Lewis Hawke; Tony Wallace |
| 5 November 2012 | Cowdenbeath (Reserve League) | Cappielow Park, Greenock | 1–0 | Martin Hardie (pen.) |
| 19 November 2012 | Airdrie United (Reserve League) | Excelsior Stadium, Airdrie | 0–0 |
| 27 November 2012 | Queen of the South (Reserve League) | Palmerston Park, Dumfries | 2–3 | Scott Keogh; Own goal |
| 19 December 2012 | Queen's Park (Reserve League) | Lesser Hampden, Glasgow | 2–0 | Aidan Fulton; Dylan McLaughlin |
| 22 December 2012 | Pollok | Newlandsfield Park, Glasgow | 2–2 | Archie Campbell; Aidan Ferris |
| 9 January 2013 | Port Glasgow | Parklea Community Stadium, Port Glasgow | 4–2 | Dylan McLaughlin; Jordan Cairnie; Aidan Ferris; Aidan Fulton |
| 29 January 2013 | Stenhousemuir (Reserve League) | Cappielow Park, Greenock | 2–2 | Thomas O'Ware; Kyle Wilkie |
| 25 March 2013 | Partick Thistle (Reserve League Cup) | Cappielow Park, Greenock | 3–1 | Declan McDaid; Peter Weatherson; Jordan Halsman |
| 8 April 2013 | Airdrie United (Reserve League Cup) | Excelsior Stadium, Airdrie | 2–3 | Jordan Cairnie; Aidan Fulton |
| 16 April 2013 | Annan Athletic (Reserve League Cup) | Galabank, Annan | 2–4 | Aidan Fulton; David McNeil |
| 18 April 2013 | Ayr United (Reserve League Cup) | Cappielow Park, Greenock | 1–5 | Michael Thomson |
| 22 April 2013 | Queen of the South (Reserve League Cup) | Cappielow Park, Greenock | 2–0 | David McNeil; Scott Keogh |
| 25 April 2013 | Rangers (Reserve League Cup) | Murray Park, Milngavie | 0–3 |
| 29 April 2013 | Queen's Park (Reserve League Cup) | Lesser Hampden, Glasgow | 1–6 | Mark Davidson |
| 16 May 2013 | Partick Thistle (Reserve League) | Battery Park, Greenock | 5–0 | Jordan Cairnie; Kyle Wilson; Fergus O'Hanlon |

== League table ==
| Pos | Team | Pld | W | D | L | GF | GA | GD | Pts | Promotion or relegation |
|---|---|---|---|---|---|---|---|---|---|---|
| 1 | Partick Thistle (C, P) | 36 | 23 | 9 | 4 | 76 | 28 | +48 | 78 | Promotion to the Premiership |
| 2 | Greenock Morton | 36 | 20 | 7 | 9 | 73 | 47 | +26 | 67 | |
| 3 | Falkirk | 36 | 15 | 8 | 13 | 52 | 48 | +4 | 53 | |
| 4 | Livingston | 36 | 14 | 10 | 12 | 58 | 56 | +2 | 52 | |
| 5 | Hamilton Academical | 36 | 14 | 9 | 13 | 52 | 45 | +7 | 51 | |

Source: SPFL Archive
Rules for classification: 1) points; 2) goal difference; 3) number of goals scored.
(C) Champions; (P) Promoted

== Player statistics ==
As of 15 May 2013

=== All competitions ===
- Additional positions played listed, if have started in more than one this season.

| Position | Player | Starts | Subs | Unused subs | Goals | Red cards (red card) | Yellow cards (yellow card) |
|---|---|---|---|---|---|---|---|
| MF | (France) Fouad Bachirou | 36 | 2 | 1 | 1 | 0 | 4 |
| FW | (Scotland) Archie Campbell | 17 | 13 | 1 | 13 | 0 | 1 |
| GK | (Scotland) Alan Combe | 0 | 0 | 7 | 0 | 0 | 0 |
| DF | (Scotland) Willie Dyer | 30 | 1 | 2 | 0 | 0 | 7 |
| MF | (Scotland) Aidan Fulton | 0 | 2 | 0 | 0 | 0 | 0 |
| GK | (Scotland) Derek Gaston | 42 | 0 | 3 | 0 | 0 | 0 |
| FW | (Scotland) Liam Gormley (trialist) | 0 | 1 | 1 | 0 | 0 | 0 |
| FW | (Scotland) David Graham | 22 | 11 | 2 | 2 | 0 | 3 |
| DF | (Scotland) Jordan Halsman | 7 | 6 | 11 | 0 | 0 | 1 |
| MF | (Scotland) Martin Hardie | 22 | 4 | 1 | 10 | 0 | 7 |
| FW | (Scotland) Lewis Hawke | 0 | 7 | 1 | 1 | 0 | 0 |
| GK | (Scotland) David Hutton | 3 | 1 | 34 | 0 | 0 | 0 |
| FW | (Scotland) Peter MacDonald | 15 | 8 | 0 | 15 | 0 | 1 |
| MF | (Scotland) Declan McDaid | 0 | 1 | 2 | 0 | 0 | 0 |
| MF | (Scotland) Dylan McLaughlin | 0 | 1 | 0 | 0 | 0 | 0 |
| DF | (Scotland) Mark McLaughlin (Captain) | 28 | 1 | 2 | 3 | 0 | 6 |
| MF | (Scotland) Ewan McLean | 0 | 1 | 0 | 0 | 0 | 0 |
| FW | (Scotland) Colin McMenamin | 11 | 4 | 0 | 2 | 0 | 0 |
| DF | (England) Simon Mensing (trialist) | 1 | 0 | 0 | 0 | 0 | 0 |
| DF | (Scotland) Jason Naismith (on loan from St Mirren) | 3 | 4 | 3 | 0 | 0 | 2 |
| MF | (Scotland) David O'Brien | 40 | 2 | 0 | 8 | 0 | 4 |
| DF | (Scotland) Thomas O'Ware | 10 | 5 | 11 | 0 | 0 | 3 |
| DF / MF | (Scotland) Craig Reid | 38 | 0 | 1 | 0 | 1 | 4 |
| DF | (Scotland) Kevin Rutkiewicz | 32 | 0 | 1 | 2 | 0 | 4 |
| MF | (Scotland) Stephen Stirling | 10 | 1 | 0 | 2 | 0 | 2 |
| DF / MF | (Scotland) Scott Taggart | 38 | 4 | 2 | 2 | 0 | 3 |
| MF | (Scotland) Michael Tidser (Vice-Captain) | 40 | 0 | 0 | 13 | 1 | 2 |
| DF / MF | (Scotland) Tony Wallace | 13 | 12 | 8 | 3 | 0 | 1 |
| MF | (Scotland) Kyle Wilkie | 11 | 16 | 9 | 3 | 0 | 1 |
| DF / FW | (England) Peter Weatherson | 26 | 11 | 3 | 12 | 0 | 2 |

=== Awards ===
Last updated 26 April 2013

| Nation | Name | Award | Month |
|---|---|---|---|
| (Scotland) | Archie Campbell | Young Player of the Month | September |
| (Scotland) | Archie Campbell | Ginger Boot | September |
| (Scotland) | Allan Moore | Manager of the Month | October |
| (Scotland) | Archie Campbell | Player of the Month | October |
| (Scotland) | Allan Moore | Manager of the Month | December |
| (Scotland) | Peter MacDonald | Player of the Month | February |
| (Scotland) | Michael Tidser | Player of the Year nominee | April |
