= Reece Hands =

English footballer (born 1993)

Personal information
- Date of birth: 6 October 1993 (age 33)
- Place of birth: Rotherham, England
- Position: Midfielder

Youth career
- –2007: Sheffield United
- 2007–2013: Blackburn Rovers

Senior career*
| Years | Team | Apps | (Gls) |
| 2013–2015 | Greenock Morton | 48 | (4) |
| 2016–2017 | Gainsborough Trinity | 22 | (6) |
| 2018–2019 | Parkgate | 9 | (4) |
| 2019 | Cincinnati Dutch Lions | 13 | (3) |
- * Club domestic league appearances and goals as of 13 August 2019

Reece Hands (born 6 October 1993) is an English retired professional footballer who last played as a defender for USL League Two side Cincinnati Dutch Lions.

In his career he also played senior football in the UK as a midfielder for National League North side Gainsborough Trinity and Scottish Championship side Greenock Morton.

== Club career ==
Hands came to Scotland having spent his career playing in youth teams at Sheffield United and Blackburn Rovers. When Hands moved to Blackburn, he rejected a scholarship with Manchester United to do so.

He signed for Greenock Morton in July 2013, and made his first competitive appearance in a 1–0 defeat in the Scottish Challenge Cup to Annan Athletic.

Hands was released by mutual consent in January 2015.

Following a successful trial period, Hands signed for Gainsborough Trinity of the National League North on 4 August 2016.

While on his Christmas break from the US, Hands signed for Parkgate F.C. on 29 November 2018. He made his debut on 1 December 2018 and inspired his team to a 3–2 win. In his second game for the club Hands helped the team to a 4–1 victory against F.C. Bolsover and got on the score sheet with a side-footed shot into the top right corner. Hands signed for the Cincinnati Dutch Lions of USL League Two for their 2019 campaign.

On 10 May 2019 he made his debut as captain against West Virginia Alliance FC and led the team to a 3–0 victory. He scored his first goal for the club on 25 May 2019 in a 3–2 loss to Flint City Bucks.

On 13 August 2019 he was named in the USL League Two Central Conference Team of the year .

== Coaching career ==
In 2017 Hands moved to Cincinnati, Ohio and started coaching with U.S. Soccer Development Academy club Cincinnati United.

== Honours ==
- Scottish League One (1): Winner 2014–15

== See also ==
- Greenock Morton F.C. season 2013-14 | 2014–15
