= Kabba-Modou Cham =

Gambian footballer

Personal information
- Date of birth: 25 December 1992 (age 33)
- Place of birth: Antwerp, Belgium
- Height: 1.88 m (6 ft 2 in)
- Position: Forward

Team information
- Current team: KSC City Pirates
- Number: 70

Youth career
- –2010: VW Hamme
- 2010–2012: Mechelen
- 2012–2013: Sint-Truiden

Senior career*
Years	Team	Apps	(Gls)
2013–2014	Greenock Morton	9	(2)
2015	Mosta		
2015–2016	KVV Coxyde		
2016–2017	KSV Bornem		
2017–2018	Cappellen		
2020–2021	Cappellen		
2025–	KSC City Pirates	0	(0)

International career
2011	Gambia U20	1	(0)
- * Club domestic league appearances and goals as of 16 January 2026

Kabba-Modou Cham (born 25 December 1992) is a footballer who plays as a forward for KSC City Pirates. Born in Belgium, he is a youth international for the Gambia.

He has also played competitively for KVV Coxyde and KSV Bornem, as well as abroad for Scottish club Greenock Morton and Mosta in Malta.

== Club career ==
Cham started his career with various professional youth academies back home in Belgium, namely K Beerschot VA, VW Hamme, K.V. Mechelen and S.K. Beveren. He started his senior career for Sint-Truiden but left after one year to go and sign for Greenock Morton in July 2013 on a two-year contract, and made his first competitive debut for Morton in a 1–0 defeat in the Scottish Challenge Cup to Annan Athletic.

Cham ingratiated himself with the Morton support after he scored a double against arch-rivals St Mirren in the Renfrewshire Cup final.

== Personal life ==
Cham was born in Belgium to a Greek mother and a Gambian father and has elected to represent Gambia at international level. To date, he has made one appearance for the Under-20 side in a 2011 African Youth Championship group match against Nigeria.

His maternal grandfather is Greek but moved to Belgium, where the striker's mother, Panayoula Kontoyannis, was born meaning that Cham is also eligible to represent Greece at international level.

== See also ==
- Greenock Morton F.C. season 2013–14
