= Jake Nicholson =

English footballer

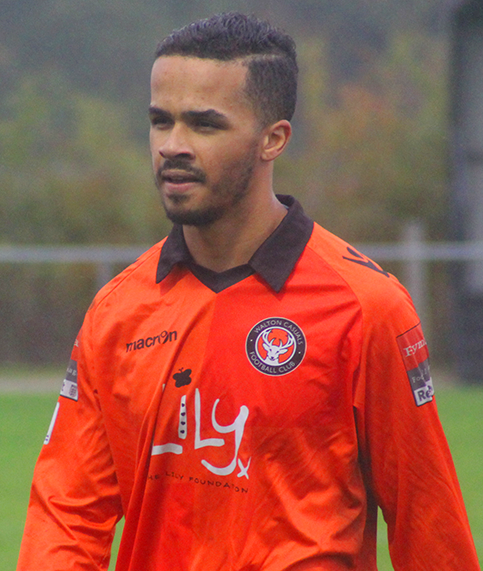

Personal information
- Full name: Jake Charlie Nicholson
- Date of birth: 19 July 1992 (age 34)
- Place of birth: Harrow, England
- Position: Midfielder

Youth career
- 2002–2009: West Ham United
- 2009–2010: Tottenham Hotspur

Senior career*
Years	Team	Apps	(Gls)
2010–2013	Tottenham Hotspur	1	(0)
2011	→ MyPa (loan)	5	(0)
2013–2014	Greenock Morton	5	(0)
2014–2015	AFC Wimbledon	6	(1)
2015	St Albans City	3	(0)
2015	Hayes & Yeading United	10	(1)
2016	Walton Casuals	26	(1)
2016	Kingstonian	3	(0)
2016	Walton Casuals	1	(0)
Total		60	(3)

International career^{‡}
2011	England U19	1	(0)
- * Club domestic league appearances and goals as of 28 August 2016 ‡ National team caps and goals as of 13:06, 24 November 2013 (UTC)

Jake Charlie Nicholson (born 19 July 1992) is an English former footballer. He is a product of the West Ham United and Tottenham Hotspur youth academies. He has also represented England at under-19 level.

== Club career ==
=== Tottenham Hotspur ===
Nicholson began his career with West Ham United, joining the club at the age of 10, but opted for a switch to Tottenham Hotspur in July 2009. After a year with the Under-18s, he was promoted to the first team ahead of the 2010–11 season.

Prior to making an appearance for the senior side, Nicholson joined Finnish club MyPa on a two-month loan in March 2011. The midfielder made his professional debut for Tottenham Hotspur on 25 August 2011, replacing Jake Livermore in a UEFA Europa League qualification play-off match against Hearts. However, it would go on to be his only appearance for the club before his release in June 2013.

=== Greenock Morton ===
In the 2013–14 season, Nicholson returned to football in a move brokered by his friend, actor Tamer Hassan. He completed a switch to Scottish club Greenock Morton on 23 November, where he remained for three months.

=== AFC Wimbledon ===
Nicholson returned to English football on 19 February 2014, when he joined League Two side AFC Wimbledon after a successful trial. Scoring on his debut in a 4–3 win against Cheltenham Town, the club were then deducted the three points after fielding Nicholson as an ineligible player. Nicholson later signed a new long-term deal with the club in May 2014. However, his contract was mutually terminated with the Dons in January 2015.

=== International career ===
Nicholson made a single appearance for the England Under-19 national team. He replaced George Thorne in the 74th minute in a 1–0 defeat to Germany on 8 February 2011.
