= Aidan Fulton =

Scottish footballer

Personal information
- Date of birth: 1 January 1994 (age 32)
- Place of birth: Greenock, Scotland
- Height: 6 ft 0 in (1.83 m)
- Position: Midfielder

Youth career
- Celtic
- St Mirren
- 2011–2012: Greenock Morton

Senior career*
Years	Team	Apps	(Gls)
2013–2014	Greenock Morton	16	(0)
- * Club domestic league appearances and goals as of 17:35, 26 September 2014 (UTC)

Aidan Fulton (born 1 January 1994) is a Scottish footballer who last played for Greenock Morton in the Scottish Championship.

== Career ==
Fulton made his senior debut at the age of 19, as a substitute against Dunfermline Athletic on 13 April 2013. Fulton officially left Morton in September 2014.

== See also ==
- Greenock Morton F.C. season 2012-13 | 2013–14
