= Jack Smith (footballer, born 1994) =

Scottish footballer

Personal information
- Date of birth: 27 December 1994 (age 31)
- Place of birth: Bellshill, Scotland
- Position: Striker

Team information
- Current team: Bo'ness United

Youth career
- 2010–2013: St Mirren

Senior career*
Years	Team	Apps	(Gls)
2012–2013	St Mirren	2	(0)
2013–2014	East Fife	4	(0)
2014	Greenock Morton	2	(0)
2014–2015	Arbroath	20	(3)
2015–2016	East Kilbride		
2016–2017	Stenhousemuir	7	(1)
2016–2017	→ East Kilbride (loan)		
2017–2018	BSC Glasgow		
2018–2020	Spartans		
2020–2021	Caledonian Braves		
2021–2022	Drumchapel United		
2022–	Bo'ness United		
- * Club domestic league appearances and goals as of 11 March 2022

Jack Smith (born 27 December 1994) is a Scottish footballer who plays as a striker for Thorniewood United.

He previously played for St Mirren, East Fife, Greenock Morton, Arbroath, East Kilbride, Stenhousemuir, BSC Glasgow, Spartans, Caledonian Braves, Drumchapel United and Bo'ness United.

== Career ==
Smith started his career with St Mirren, making two brief appearances as a substitute in the 2012–13 Scottish Premier League before signing for East Fife in 2013. After a trial match plus three other appearances for the Fifers, Smith signed for Greenock Morton's development squad in January 2014. He made his debut on 22 February as a substitute against Alloa Athletic. He was released at the end of the 2013–14 season.

After his release by Morton, Smith signed for Arbroath until May 2015, only making four starts in a full season. He subsequently signed for Lowland League side, East Kilbride in August 2015.

After impressing for East Kilbride, Smith was signed by Scottish League One side Stenhousemuir in June 2016. In November 2016, Smith returned to East Kilbride on a short-term loan. Smith only lasted twelve months with the Ochilview side, and was released at the end of the 2016–17 season.

After a season with BSC Glasgow in the Lowland League, On 25 June 2018 Smith moved, within the division to the reigning champions Spartans.

Smith decided to leave Spartans in May 2020 to play football closer to home and later signed for Caledonian Braves in July 2020.

Drumchapel United announced the signing of Smith on 29 May 2021.

Smith signed with Bo'ness United in February 2022.

== Personal life ==
Smith is the son of former Dunfermline Athletic and Airdrieonians striker Andy Smith.
