= Michal Habai =

Slovak footballer

Personal information
- Date of birth: 30 July 1985 (age 41)
- Place of birth: Bratislava, Czechoslovakia
- Height: 1.85 m (6 ft 1 in)
- Positions: Defender; defensive midfielder

Youth career
- 1997–2004: Slovan Bratislava

Senior career*
Years	Team	Apps	(Gls)
2004–2008	Slovan Bratislava	?	(?)
2007–2008	→ Baník Sokolov (loan)	?	(?)
2008–2010	Baník Sokolov	37	(0)
2010–2012	SFM Senec	?	(?)
2012–2013	Petržalka	?	(?)
2013–2014	Greenock Morton	15	(1)
2014	Livingston	7	(0)
2014–2015	Rača	?	(?)
2015–2018	Danubia Hrubý Šúr	?	(?)
2018–	SV Petzenkirchen	?	(?)
- * Club domestic league appearances and goals

Michal Habai (born 30 July 1985) is a Slovak former professional footballer who played as a defender or defensive midfielder.

== Club career ==
Habai came to Scotland at the age of 27, having spent his career playing in his homeland of Slovakia, with a spell in the Czech Republic with Druhá liga side Baník Sokolov.

He signed for Greenock Morton in July 2013, and made his first competitive debut for Morton in a 1–0 defeat in the Scottish Challenge Cup to Annan Athletic. He scored his first goal for Morton in a 6-2 Scottish League Cup win over East Fife.

Habai turned down an offer of a trial from League One side Rangers after catching their eye playing as a trialist in Morton's pre-season friendly with Sheffield United.

Morton released Habai in January 2014, he signed for Livingston the same day. He was released by Livingston in May 2014. At the start of the 2015–16 season, Habai joined FK Rača in the Slovak third tier.

Habai moved to Austrian lower-league side SV Petzenkirchen in the summer of 2018.

== Personal life ==
Although Habai played for Slovan Bratislava, he was a childhood fan of city rivals Artmedia Bratislava (who famously defeated Celtic in the UEFA Champions League qualifiers in 2005).

== See also ==
- Greenock Morton F.C. season 2013-14
