= Ewan McLean =

Scottish footballer

Personal information
- Date of birth: 11 September 1994 (age 32)
- Place of birth: Glasgow, Scotland
- Height: 6 ft 0 in (1.83 m)
- Position: Midfielder

Youth career
- Campsie Black Watch
- Greenock Morton

Senior career*
Years	Team	Apps	(Gls)
2013	Greenock Morton	1	(0)
2013	Queen's Park (trial)	1	(0)
- * Club domestic league appearances and goals as of 10:31, 7 May 2013 (UTC)

Ewan McLean (born 11 September 1994 in Greenock) is a Scottish footballer who last played for Greenock Morton in the Scottish Championship.

== Career ==
McLean made his senior debut at the age of 18, as a substitute against Falkirk on 4 May 2013.

After his release in August 2013, McLean played a trial match for Queen's Park replacing Paul Burns for the last 25 minutes against Peterhead at Balmoor Stadium.

== See also ==
- Greenock Morton F.C. season 2012-13
