= 2016–17 Greenock Morton F.C. season =

Greenock Morton
2016-17 season
- Chairman: Douglas Rae
- Manager: Jim Duffy
- Stadium: Cappielow Park
- Championship: 4th (playoffs)
- Challenge Cup: 3rd Round (lost v Queen's Park)
- League Cup: Semi-final (lost v Aberdeen)
- Scottish Cup: 5th Round (lost v Rangers)
- Top goalscorer: League: Ross Forbes (9); All: Ross Forbes (12)
- Highest home attendance: League: 4,609 v St Mirren; Cup: 2,349 v Falkirk
- Lowest home attendance: League: 1,451 v Queen of the South; Cup: 931 v Clyde
- Average home league attendance: 2,362
Home colours	Away colours

Season 2016–17 saw Greenock Morton compete in the Scottish Championship the second tier of Scottish football, having finished fifth in 2015-16. Morton also competed in the Challenge Cup, Scottish League Cup and the Scottish Cup.

== Story of the season ==
=== May ===
Manager Jim Duffy signed a new two-year deal after successfully keeping the team in the Championship and reaching two cup quarter-finals.

Lee Kilday, Jon Scullion and Ricki Lamie were confirmed as having signed new contracts.

Dylan Stevenson, John Mitchell, John Tennent, Thomas Orr, Jamie McGowan and Conor Pepper all agreed new deals. Meanwhile, Peter MacDonald left the club for a second time, to join Clyde.

The other four senior players at the club, Stefan McCluskey, Michael Miller, Joe McKee and Andy McNeil were offered contracts.

Six of the club's under-17 side made the step up to the full-time development squad.

Derek Allan took a year off from coaching the club's under-17 side.

The new coaching line-ups for the 2016–17 season were announced, with Livingston defender Sean Crighton and Thomas O'Ware coaching the club's under-15s.

Morton gave their fans the chance to vote for a new strip after an Ajax-style strip was overwhelmingly rejected by the support. The vote would go public on 27 May.

Michael Miller left to sign with newly relegated Livingston.

Craig McPherson signed a two-year deal to stay on as Jim Duffy's assistant.

Joe McKee signed for Carlisle United, whilst full-back Michael Doyle joined from St Johnstone.

=== June ===
The new strip was announced as being blue and white hoops with yellow sidings.

Morton found out that they would open their season with an away trip in the Betfred Cup to Albion Rovers.

Jim Duffy signed his nephew Gary Oliver on a two-year deal from Queen of the South for a nominal fee after he rejected terms at QotS as well as Plymouth Argyle and St Mirren.

The new format of the Challenge Cup was announced, with Morton due to start in the third round instead of the first as in previous years.

The fixture lists were released on 17 June, with a derby match away to St Mirren being announced as the first game of the season.

Morton took three players in on trial including Kidderminster midfielder Reece Hales. Hales's trial was ended along with an unnamed Dutch trialist, but Jamie McDonagh's trial was extended. McDonagh was then offered a contract with the club, with the club expecting to hear back soon afterwards.

=== July ===
Morton's chief executive Gillian Donaldson quit the club after 15 years.

After a short trial, Morton signed Jamie McDonagh from Sheffield United and Caolan McAleer from Airdrie.

Thomas Orr was loaned out to Livingston.

Morton sign Celtic starlet Jamie Lindsay on loan for the season.

Morton were given a second round tie away at Hamilton Accies in the League Cup.

=== August ===
After a successful trial in a friendly against Kilbirnie Ladeside, Morton signed English striker Kudus Oyenuga on a one-year contract.

Aidan Nesbitt signed on loan on 9 August.

After defeating Hamilton Accies, Morton were given a quarter-final home tie against Dundee United.

Dylan Stevenson left the club by mutual consent to join Junior side Auchinleck Talbot.

Morton received a trip to Hampden Park in the third-round of the Challenge Cup, drawing Queen's Park away.

Alex McWaters joined Largs Thistle on loan until January. John Tennent also went out on loan to Lowland League side Cumbernauld Colts.

Thomas Orr was recalled from his loan deal at Livingston.

On the last day of the transfer window, Morton rejected an offer for Jai Quitongo from Doncaster Rovers.

=== September ===
Morton signed Irish centre-back Gavin Gunning on a short-term deal.

Winger Scott Tiffoney and full-back Lewis Strapp signed new deals to tie them to the club until summer 2018.

Morton reached the semi-final of the Scottish League Cup for the first time since 1981 beating Dundee United to reach Hampden to face Aberdeen.

Central midfielder Andy Murdoch joined the club.

Morton's development squad were drawn at home to Banks O' Dee in the Scottish Youth Cup third round.

=== October ===
Morton received an away draw against Junior side Beith Juniors in the third round of the Scottish Cup.

Alongside Aidan Nesbitt who won his first cap earlier in the season; Jai Quitongo received his first call-up to the Scotland U21 call-up.

=== November ===
After a convincing win over Banks O' Dee in the third round of the Scottish Youth Cup, Morton received an away tie against Motherwell in the fourth.

John Tennent was recalled from his loan spell at Broadwood Stadium.

Scott Tiffoney joined League Two side Clyde on loan until January.

Thomas O'Ware was named October's player of the month, and Jim Duffy named as manager of the month.

Andy Murdoch extended his contract until the end of the season.

=== December ===
Morton defeated Beith Juniors 6-0 to progress to a fourth round meeting with Falkirk.

Development squad defender John Mitchell made a short-term loan switch to local side Greenock Juniors.

Caolan McAleer was allowed to leave the club early and return to Northern Ireland.

Jon Scullion signed until the end of the season.

A red tartan effort was chosen by fan vote to be the new away strip for next season.

Kudus Oyenuga signed a contract extension until the end of the season.

=== January ===
John Tennent was released at the end of his short-term contract, as Scott Tiffoney returned from Clyde.

Andrew McNeil left the club to move into coaching with Guangzhou R&F.

Reserve team captain Ruaridh Langan joined Neilston Juniors on loan, whilst Alex McWaters spell at Largs Thistle was extended until the end of January.

Aidan Nesbitt's loan was extended until the end of the season.

Gavin Gunning left the club on the expiration of his short-term contract to sign for EFL League Two side Grimsby Town.

Warren Hawke was appointed chief executive of the club.

After his loan at St Mirren was terminated, Lawrence Shankland signed on loan from Aberdeen.

After defeating Falkirk in round 4, Morton were given an away tie against Rangers at Ibrox Stadium.

Blair Docherty signed his first professional contract, tying him to the club until the end of May.

Cappielow was announced as being the host for the Scotland U17 game against their Montenegrin counterparts. The schoolboy international with England will also be played at Cappielow.

Thomas Orr joined ex-Morton striker Aidan Ferris when he signed on loan at Alloa-based Scottish Lowland Football League side BSC Glasgow.

=== February ===
Ross Forbes won SPFL Championship Player of the Month for January 2017.

Morton signed a third player on loan from Celtic; long-time target, forward Luke Donnelly.

Dumbarton striker Robert Thomson signed a pre-contract agreement with the club.

=== March ===
Jai Quitongo signed a contract extension to keep him at the club for a further year.

=== April ===
Bryn Halliwell returned to the club on loan from Gartcairn Juniors to provide back-up to Derek Gaston.

Despite a serious downturn in form, Morton secured a playoff place thanks to other results going their way.

Ross Forbes was nominated for Championship Player of the Year.

=== May ===
Jim Duffy was nominated for SPFL Manager of the Year, alongside Brendan Rodgers, Alan Archibald and Derek McInnes.

Ross Forbes and Thomas O'Ware were selected in the PFA Scotland Championship Team of the Year.

Thomas Orr, Alex McWaters and John Mitchell were released. Meanwhile youngsters Jamie McGowan and Ben Armour signed one-year and six-month extensions respectively.

Four members of the first team squad were released; Kudus Oyenuga, Conor Pepper, Jon Scullion and Jamie McDonagh.

Jim Duffy was named as Championship Manager of the Season by league sponsors Ladbrokes.

== First team transfers ==
- From end of 2015-16 season, to last match of season 2016-17

=== In ===
Player	From	League	Fee
(Scotland) Michael Doyle	(Scotland) St Johnstone	Scottish Premiership	Free
(Scotland) Gary Oliver	(Scotland) Queen of the South	Scottish Championship	Nominal
(Northern Ireland) Jamie McDonagh	(England) Sheffield United	EFL League One	Free
(Northern Ireland) Caolan McAleer	(Scotland) Airdrieonians	Scottish League One	Free
(Scotland) Jamie Lindsay	(Scotland) Celtic	Scottish Premiership	Loan
(England) Kudus Oyenuga	(England) Hartlepool United	EFL League Two	Free
(Scotland) Aidan Nesbitt	(Scotland) Celtic	Scottish Premiership	Loan
(Republic of Ireland) Gavin Gunning	(Scotland) Dundee United	Scottish Premiership	Free
(Scotland) Andy Murdoch	(Scotland) Rangers	Scottish Premiership	Free
(Scotland) Lawrence Shankland	(Scotland) Aberdeen	Scottish Premiership	Loan
(Scotland) Luke Donnelly	(Scotland) Celtic	Scottish Premiership	Loan
(England) Bryn Halliwell	(Scotland) Gartcairn Juniors	West of Scotland League Central District Second Division	Loan

=== Out ===
Player	To	League	Fee
(Scotland) Peter MacDonald	(Scotland) Clyde	Scottish League Two	Free
(Scotland) Bobby Barr	(Scotland) Raith Rovers	Scottish Championship	Bosman
(Scotland) Michael Miller	(Scotland) Livingston	Scottish League One	Bosman
(Scotland) Joe McKee	(England) Carlisle United	EFL League Two	Bosman
(Scotland) Stefan McCluskey	(Scotland) Peterhead	Scottish League One	Free
(Scotland) Jamie McGowan	(Scotland) Cumbernauld United	West of Scotland Super League First Division	Loan
(Scotland) Thomas Orr	(Scotland) Livingston	Scottish League One	Loan
(Scotland) Dylan Stevenson	(Scotland) Auchinleck Talbot	West of Scotland Super League Premier Division	Free
(Scotland) Alex McWaters	(Scotland) Largs Thistle	West of Scotland Super League Premier Division	Loan
(Scotland) John Tennent	(Scotland) Cumbernauld Colts	Scottish Lowland Football League	Loan
(Scotland) Scott Tiffoney	(Scotland) Clyde	Scottish League Two	Loan
(Scotland) John Mitchell	(Scotland) Greenock Juniors	West of Scotland League Central District First Division	Loan
(Northern Ireland) Caolan McAleer	(Republic of Ireland) Finn Harps	League of Ireland Premier Division	Free
(Scotland) John Tennent	(Scotland) Largs Thistle	West of Scotland Super League Premier Division	Free
(Scotland) Andrew McNeil	(China) Guangzhou R&F	Chinese Super League	Free
(Scotland) Ruaridh Langan	(Scotland) Neilston Juniors	West of Scotland League Central District First Division	Loan
(Republic of Ireland) Gavin Gunning	(England) Grimsby Town	EFL League Two	Free
(Scotland) Thomas Orr	(Scotland) BSC Glasgow	Scottish Lowland Football League	Loan
(Scotland) Thomas Orr	(Scotland) Queen's Park	Scottish League One	Free
(Scotland) Alex McWaters	(Scotland) Annan Athletic	Scottish League Two	Free
(Scotland) John Mitchell	(Scotland) Stranraer	Scottish League One	Free
(Scotland) Jon Scullion			Free
(England) Kudus Oyenuga	(England) Chelmsford City	National League South	Free
(Republic of Ireland) Conor Pepper			Free
(Northern Ireland) Jamie McDonagh	(Republic of Ireland) Sligo Rovers	League of Ireland Premier Division	Free

== Fixtures and results ==
Win Draw Loss Upcoming fixture

=== Friendlies ===
24 June 2016 Friendly	Dundee	1 – 1	Greenock Morton	Dundee
	Craig Wighton	report	Gary Oliver	Stadium: Riverside Pitches

28 June 2016 Friendly	Greenock Morton	1 – 1	Airdrieonians	Port Glasgow
	Thomas Orr		Robbie Leighton	Stadium: Port Glasgow Community Stadium

5 July 2016 Friendly	Livingston	2 – 2	Greenock Morton	Livingston
19:00	Kudus Oyenuga; Danny Mullen	report	Scott Tiffoney	Stadium: Almondvale Stadium; Referee: Colin Steven

9 July 2016 Friendly	Greenock Morton	1 – 2	Partick Thistle	Greenock
15:00	Michael Tidser 45'	report	Chris Erskine 12', 33'	Stadium: Cappielow Park; Attendance: 607; Referee: Barry Cook

26 July 2016 Friendly	Greenock Morton	1 – 2	(Wales) Swansea City U23	Greenock
19:30	Jon Scullion	report	George Byers; Tom Holland	Stadium: Cappielow Park; Attendance: 377

=== Scottish Championship ===
6 August 2016 1	St Mirren	1 – 1	Greenock Morton	Paisley
15:00	John Sutton 83'	report	Thomas O'Ware 17'	Stadium: St Mirren Park; Attendance: 4,997; Referee: Steven McLean

13 August 2016 2	Greenock Morton	1 – 1	Falkirk	Greenock
15:00	Lee Kilday 25'	report	Luke Leahy 90+2'	Stadium: Cappielow Park; Attendance: 2,079; Referee: John Beaton

20 August 2016 3	Greenock Morton	1 – 1	Dumbarton	Greenock
15:00	Kudus Oyenuga 62'	report	Derek Gaston 28' (o.g.)	Stadium: Cappielow Park; Attendance: 1,586; Referee: Mat Northcroft

27 August 2016 4	Hibernian	4 – 0	Greenock Morton	Edinburgh
15:00	Andrew Shinnie 29'; Grant Holt 41'; Jason Cummings 54'; Brian Graham 74'	report		Stadium: Easter Road; Attendance: 14,508; Referee: Alan Muir

10 September 2016 5	Ayr United	2 – 1	Greenock Morton	Ayr
15:00	Paul Cairney 47'; Alan Forrest 69'	report	Mark Russell (red card) 74'; Ross Forbes 86'	Stadium: Somerset Park; Attendance: 1,441; Referee: John McKendrick

18 September 2016 6	Greenock Morton	2 – 1	Dunfermline Athletic	Greenock
15:00	Gary Oliver 24'; Jai Quitongo 84'	report	Nicky Clark 30'	Stadium: Cappielow Park; Attendance: 1,756; Referee: Kevin Clancy

24 September 2016 7	Dundee United	2 – 1	Greenock Morton	Dundee
15:00	Tony Andreu 64', 90+1'	report	Sean Dillon 90+4' (o.g.)	Stadium: Tannadice Park; Attendance: 5,829; Referee: Barry Cook

1 October 2016 8	Greenock Morton	1 – 0	Raith Rovers	Greenock
15:00	Ross Forbes 18'	report		Stadium: Cappielow Park; Attendance: 1,528; Referee: Craig Charleston

15 October 2016 9	Queen of the South	0 – 5	Greenock Morton	Dumfries
15:00		report	Ross Forbes 6'; Jamie McDonagh 33'; Gary Oliver 36'; Jai Quitongo 64'; Thomas O'Ware 72' (pen.)	Stadium: Palmerston Park; Attendance: 1,695; Referee: Steven Kirkland

29 October 2016 10	Greenock Morton	2 – 1	Ayr United	Greenock
15:00	Thomas O'Ware 73'; Gary Oliver 89'	report	Kevin Nisbet 37'	Stadium: Cappielow Park; Attendance: 1,859; Referee: Mat Northcroft

1 November 2016 11	Greenock Morton	3 – 1	St Mirren	Greenock
19:45	Thomas O'Ware 15'; Ross Forbes 27'; Gary Oliver 68'	report	Ben Gordon 86'	Stadium: Cappielow Park; Attendance: 3,378; Referee: Euan Anderson; Man of the Match: Gary Oliver

5 November 2016 12	Falkirk	1 – 1	Greenock Morton	Grangemouth
15:00	Lee Miller 90+3'	report	Lee Kilday 89'	Stadium: Falkirk Stadium; Attendance: 4,432; Referee: Greg Aitken

12 November 2016 13	Dumbarton	0 – 2	Greenock Morton	Dumbarton
15:00		report	Mark Russell 69'; Kudus Oyenuga 76'	Stadium: Dumbarton Football Stadium; Attendance: 1,147; Referee: Don Robertson

19 November 2016 14	Greenock Morton	0 – 0	Dundee United	Greenock
15:00		report		Stadium: Cappielow Park; Attendance: 2,578; Referee: Crawford Allan

3 December 2016	Greenock Morton	P – P	Raith Rovers	Greenock
15:00				Stadium: Cappielow Park

10 December 2016 15	Dunfermline Athletic	2 – 1	Greenock Morton	Dunfermline
15:00	Michael Moffat 12', 23'	report	Thomas O'Ware (penalty missed); Aidan Nesbitt 43'	Stadium: East End Park; Attendance: 3,101; Referee: Stephen Finnie

17 December 2016 16	Greenock Morton	1 – 1	Hibernian	Greenock
17:15 (live on BBC Alba)	Gary Oliver 79'	report	Jason Cummings 81'	Stadium: Cappielow Park; Attendance: 2,156; Referee: Steven McLean

24 December 2016 17	Greenock Morton	1 – 0	Queen of the South	Greenock
13:00	Thomas O'Ware 17'	report		Stadium: Cappielow Park; Attendance: 1,638; Referee: Barry Cook

31 December 2016 18	St Mirren	1 – 1	Greenock Morton	Paisley
15:00	Gary MacKenzie 30'	report	Ricki Lamie 90+3'	Stadium: St Mirren Park; Attendance: 4,902; Referee: Nick Walsh

7 January 2017 19	Greenock Morton	2 – 1	Dumbarton	Greenock
15:00	Gregor Buchanan 19' (o.g.); Michael Tidser 66' (pen.)	report	Andy Stirling 69'	Stadium: Cappielow Park; Attendance: 2,094; Referee: John Beaton

14 January 2017 20	Greenock Morton	2 – 0	Raith Rovers	Greenock
15:00	Ross Forbes 27'; Lawrence Shankland 67'	report		Stadium: Cappielow Park; Attendance: 1,957; Referee: Gavin Duncan

28 January 2017 21	Ayr United	1 – 4	Greenock Morton	Ayr
17:15 (live on BBC Alba)	Jamie Adams 36'	report	Ross Forbes 11', 19'; Gary Oliver 31', 65'	Stadium: Somerset Park; Attendance: 1,576; Referee: Don Robertson

4 February 2017 22	Queen of the South	3 – 0	Greenock Morton	Dumfries
15:00	Derek Lyle 71'; Kyle Jacobs 83'; Joe Thomson 90+3'	report		Stadium: Palmerston Park; Attendance: 1,588; Referee: Bobby Madden

7 February 2017 23	Raith Rovers	0 – 1	Greenock Morton	Kirkcaldy
19:45		report	Lee Kilday 53'	Stadium: Stark's Park; Attendance: 1,161; Referee: Gavin Duncan

18 February 2017 24	Greenock Morton	2 – 2	Falkirk	Greenock
15:00	Thomas O'Ware 13'; Ross Forbes 68'	report	James Craigen 43'; Aaron Muirhead 50' (pen.)	Stadium: Cappielow Park; Attendance: 2,397; Referee: Greg Aitken

25 February 2017 25	Dundee United	1 – 1	Greenock Morton	Dundee
15:00	Mark Durnan 83'	report	Lee Kilday 39'	Stadium: Tannadice Park; Attendance: 6,065; Referee: Kevin Clancy

11 March 2017 26	Greenock Morton	1 – 0	Queen of the South	Greenock
17:15 (live on BBC Alba)	Ross Forbes 55'	report		Stadium: Cappielow Park; Attendance: 1,451; Referee: Craig Charleston; Man of the Match: Aidan Nesbitt

18 March 2017 27	Falkirk	0 – 1	Greenock Morton	Grangemouth
17:15 (live on BBC Alba)		report	Kudus Oyenuga 79'	Stadium: Falkirk Stadium; Attendance: 4,584; Referee: Alan Muir; Man of the Match: Aidan Nesbitt

25 March 2017 28	Greenock Morton	0 – 1	Dunfermline Athletic	Greenock
15:00		report	Nat Wedderburn 16'	Stadium: Cappielow Park; Attendance: 2,670; Referee: Mat Northcroft

29 March 2017 29	Hibernian	0 – 0	Greenock Morton	Edinburgh
19:45	Darren McGregor (red card) 90+4'		Kudus Oyenuga (red card) 90+3'	Stadium: Easter Road; Attendance: 15,149; Referee: Nick Walsh

1 April 2017 30	Dumbarton	1 – 0	Greenock Morton	Dumbarton
15:00	Lewis Vaughan 59'	report		Stadium: Dumbarton Football Stadium; Attendance: 1,323; Referee: John Beaton

8 April 2017 31	Greenock Morton	1 – 1	Hibernian	Greenock
15:00	Lawrence Shankland 66' (pen.)	report	Jason Cummings 34'	Stadium: Cappielow Park; Attendance: 4,229; Referee: Bobby Madden

11 April 2017 32	Greenock Morton	1 – 4	St Mirren	Greenock
19:45	Andy Murdoch 29'	report	Stelios Demetriou 20'; Stevie Mallan 45'; John Sutton 56'; Gary MacKenzie 80'	Stadium: Cappielow Park; Attendance: 4,609; Referee: Stephen Finnie

15 April 2017 33	Raith Rovers	2 – 0	Greenock Morton	Kirkcaldy
15:00	Craig Barr 28'; Ross Matthews 59'	report		Stadium: Stark's Park; Attendance: 1,720; Referee: Alan Newlands

22 April 2017 34	Greenock Morton	1 – 1	Ayr United	Greenock
15:00	Lawrence Shankland 38'	report	Craig Moore 45+1'	Stadium: Cappielow Park; Attendance: 2,390; Referee: Steven Kirkland

29 April 2017 35	Dunfermline Athletic	3 – 1	Greenock Morton	Dunfermline
15:00	Nicky Clark 3'; Michael Moffat 51'; Rhys McCabe 85'	report	Lawrence Shankland 37'	Stadium: East End Park; Attendance: 3,339; Referee: Euan Anderson

6 May 2017 36	Greenock Morton	1 – 1	Dundee United	Greenock
15:00	Kudus Oyenuga 52'	report	Blair Spittal 63'	Stadium: Cappielow Park; Attendance: 2,158; Referee: John Beaton; Man of the Match: Thomas O'Ware

=== Scottish Premiership Playoffs ===
9 May 2017 Quarter-final Leg 1	Greenock Morton	1 – 2	Dundee United	Greenock
19:45	Thomas O'Ware 7'	report	Simon Murray 51'; Blair Spittal 65'	Stadium: Cappielow Park; Attendance: 3,306; Referee: Willie Collum

12 May 2017 Quarter-final Leg 2	Dundee United	3 – 0	Greenock Morton	Dundee
19:45	Simon Murray 52'; Wato Kuaté 64'; Blair Spittal 81'	report		Stadium: Tannadice Park; Attendance: 6,606; Referee: Andrew Dallas

=== Scottish Cup ===
26 November 2016 3rd round	Beith Juniors	P – P	Greenock Morton	Beith
13:30				Stadium: Bellsdale Park

3 December 2016 3rd round	Beith Juniors	0 – 6	Greenock Morton	Beith
13:30		report	Ross Forbes 11'; Michael Tidser 16'; Jamie McDonagh 42'; Thomas O'Ware 51', 90'; Jamie Lindsay 78'	Stadium: Bellsdale Park; Attendance: 1,693; Referee: John McKendrick

21 January 2017 4th round	Greenock Morton	2 – 0	Falkirk	Greenock
15:00	Jamie Lindsay 39'; Ross Forbes 47'	report		Stadium: Cappielow Park; Attendance: 2,349; Referee: Greg Aitken

12 February 2017 5th round	Rangers	2 – 1	Greenock Morton	Glasgow
15:00 (live on Sky Sports)	Kenny Miller 13'; Martyn Waghorn 61'	report	Michael Tidser 7'	Stadium: Ibrox Stadium; Attendance: 30,295; Referee: Andrew Dallas

=== Scottish League Cup ===
16 July 2016 Group stage	Albion Rovers	0 – 0; 3 – 4 on pens	Greenock Morton	Coatbridge
15:00		report		Stadium: Cliftonhill; Attendance: 431; Referee: John Beaton

19 July 2016 Group Stage	Greenock Morton	1 – 0	Clyde	Greenock
19:45	Thomas O'Ware 77'	report		Stadium: Cappielow Park; Attendance: 931; Referee: John McKendrick; Man of the Match: Scott Tiffoney

23 July 2016 Group Stage	Kilmarnock	0 – 2	Greenock Morton	Kilmarnock
15:00		report	Gary Oliver 7'; Jai Quitongo 67'	Stadium: Rugby Park; Attendance: 3,020; Referee: Steven McLean; Man of the Match: Jai Quitongo

30 July 2016 Group Stage	Greenock Morton	2 – 0	(England) Berwick Rangers	Greenock
15:00	Jamie Lindsay 2'; Jai Quitongo 16'	report		Stadium: Cappielow Park; Attendance: 1,044; Referee: Alan Newlands; Man of the Match: Jamie Lindsay

9 August 2016 2nd Round	Hamilton Academical	1 – 2	Greenock Morton	Hamilton
19:45	Dougie Imrie 8' (pen.)	report	Ross Forbes 59'; Jai Quitongo 63'	Stadium: New Douglas Park; Attendance: 1,112; Referee: Stephen Finnie

20 September 2016 Quarter-final	Greenock Morton	2 – 1	Dundee United	Greenock
19:45	Jai Quitongo 24'; Thomas O'Ware 31'	report	Nick van der Velden 55'	Stadium: Cappielow Park; Attendance: 2,149; Referee: Andrew Dallas; Man of the Match: Jai Quitongo

22 October 2016 Semi-final	Greenock Morton	0 – 2	Aberdeen	Glasgow
12:15 (Live on BT Sport)		report	Adam Rooney 69'; Kenny McLean 88'	Stadium: Hampden Park; Attendance: 16,183; Referee: Kevin Clancy; Man of the Match: Kenny McLean

=== Scottish Challenge Cup ===
3 September 2016 3rd Round	Queen's Park	2 – 0	Greenock Morton	Glasgow
15:00	Adam Cummins 44'; David Galt 46'	report		Stadium: Hampden Park; Attendance: 1,085; Referee: Gavin Duncan

=== Development squad ===
==== Friendlies ====
15 June 2016 Friendly	(Bulgaria) Cherno More Varna	0 – 2	Greenock Morton	Varna
19:00		report	? (o.g.); Scott Miller	Stadium: Sportpalace Hotel

30 June 2016 Friendly	Cumbernauld Colts	3 – 0	Greenock Morton	Cumbernauld
19:45	Goal			Stadium: Broadwood Stadium

12 July 2016 Friendly	Queen's Park	1 – 2	Greenock Morton	Glasgow
	Goal		Thomas Orr; Alex McWaters	Stadium: Lesser Hampden

28 July 2016 Friendly	Largs Thistle	4 – 1	Greenock Morton XI	Largs
19:15	James Marks; Michael Lennox; Steve Lamont		Blair Docherty	Stadium: Barrfields

3 August 2016 Friendly	Kilbirnie Ladeside	1 – 1	Greenock Morton XI	Kilbirnie
19:00	Chris Malone		Scott Tiffoney	Stadium: Valefield Park

21 August 2016 Friendly	Greenock Juniors	1 – 5	Greenock Morton XI	Greenock
13:00	Daniel Patton	report	Caolan McAleer; John Mitchell; Ryan McWilliams (o.g.); Ruaridh Langan	Stadium: Ravenscraig Stadium

17 January 2017 Friendly	Ardrossan Winton Rovers	1 – 3	Greenock Morton	Ardrossan
19:30	Larry McMahon 53'	report	John Mitchell 30'; Thomas Orr 34', 50' (pen.)	Stadium: Winton Park; Referee: Calum Scott

==== Development League West ====
6 September 2016 1	Stranraer	2 – 2	Greenock Morton	Stranraer
20:00	Evan Maley 37'; Adam Lawrie 89'	report	Jamie McDonagh 34', 35'	Stadium: Stair Park; Referee: Calum Haswell

13 September 2016 2	Greenock Morton	2 – 1	Queen's Park	Greenock
19:30	Jon Scullion 58', 63'	report	Jamie Gallagher 74'	Stadium: Cappielow Park; Referee: David Dickinson

22 September 2016 3	Airdrieonians	1 – 2	Greenock Morton	Motherwell
15:00	Conor Scullion 36'	report	Alex McWaters 75'; Jack Purdue 90+1'	Stadium: Ravenscraig Regional Sports Facility; Referee: Craig King

4 October 2016 4	Greenock Morton	3 – 0	Ayr United	Greenock
19:30	Jon Scullion 3', 74', 86'	report		Stadium: Cappielow Park; Referee: Calum Haswell

10 October 2016 5	Greenock Morton	3 – 0	Clyde	Greenock
19:30	Alex McWaters 58'; Ben Armour 59'; Scott Tiffoney 72'	report		Stadium: Cappielow Park; Referee: Stephen Brown

18 October 2016 6	Queen of the South	2 – 3	Greenock Morton	Dumfries
19:30	Owen Moxon 13' (pen.), 50'	report	Thomas Orr 18' (pen.); Kudus Oyenuga 28'; Scott Tiffoney 67'	Stadium: Palmerston Park; Referee: Calum Scott

24 October 2016 7	Greenock Morton	5 – 2	Albion Rovers	Greenock
19:30	Jon Scullion 16'; Thomas Orr 18', 80'; Michael Tidser 28'; Ruaridh Langan 31'	report	Ryan McManus 46'; Connor Shields 84'	Stadium: Cappielow Park; Referee: Graham Grainger

31 October 2016 8	Stranraer	1 – 4	Greenock Morton	Stranraer
20:00	Evan Maley 85'	report	Lewis Strapp 24'; Jack Purdue 27', 43', 65'	Stadium: Stair Park; Referee: Calum Scott

15 November 2016 9	Greenock Morton	3 – 0	Airdrieonians	Port Glasgow
13:30	Alex McWaters 42' (pen.); Caolan McAleer 49'; Scott Miller 86'	report		Stadium: Port Glasgow Community Stadium; Referee: Duncan Williams

21 November 2016 10	Ayr United	0 – 0	Greenock Morton	Cumnock
19:45		report	John Mitchell (red card) 21'; Alex McWaters (penalty missed)	Stadium: Townhead Park; Referee: Lloyd Wilson

6 December 2016 11	Clyde	1 – 8	Greenock Morton	Lennoxtown
19:30	Craig Quinn 88'	report	Kudus Oyenuga 3'; Jon Scullion 23' (pen.), 32'; Conor Pepper 30'; Lewis Strapp 66'; Scott Miller 74', 88'; Caolan McAleer 76'	Stadium: Lennoxtown training centre Referee: David Dickinson

14 December 2016 12	Queen's Park	0 – 3	Greenock Morton	Glasgow
19:45		report	Jon Scullion 27', 28', 44'	Stadium: Lesser Hampden; Referee: Chris Gentles

31 January 2017	Greenock Morton	P – P	Queen of the South	Greenock
19:30				Stadium: Cappielow Park

8 February 2017 13	Albion Rovers	4 – 0	Greenock Morton	Coatbridge
19:45	Connor Shields 40', 60', 80'; Jamie Gallagher 54'		Alex McWaters (red card) 65'	Stadium: Cliftonhill; Referee: Graham Grainger

14 February 2017 14	Greenock Morton	2 – 1	Stranraer	Greenock
19:30	Kudus Oyenuga 41'; Thomas Orr 53'	report	Amadou Kassaraté 49'	Stadium: Cappielow Park; Referee: Garry Doherty

21 February 2017	Greenock Morton	P – P	Queen's Park	Greenock
19:30				Stadium: Cappielow Park

28 February 2017 15	Airdrieonians	3 – 5	Greenock Morton	Motherwell
14:00	Daniel Boateng 3'; Murray Loudon 50', 55' (pen.)	report	John Mitchell 15'; Thomas Orr 33', 68'; Ruaridh Langan 56'; Jon Scullion 70'	Stadium: Ravenscraig Regional Sports Facility

7 March 2017 16	Greenock Morton	2 – 2	Ayr United	Greenock
19:30	Alex McWaters 62', 89'	report	Sean McKenzie 18'; Jack Sherrie 81'	Stadium: Cappielow Park; Referee: Ross Menzies

14 March 2017 17	Clyde	2 – 1	Greenock Morton	Croy
20:00	Ronan Sweeney 40'; Aaron Miller 62'	report	Jack Purdue 33'	Stadium: Broadwood Stadium (outdoor pitches); Referee: Matthew MacDermid

21 March 2017 18	Queen of the South	4 – 0	Greenock Morton	Dumfries
19:30	Ross Fergusson 21'; Aidan Smith 51'; Connor Murray 65', 66'	report		Stadium: Palmerston Park; Referee: Lloyd Wilson

30 March 2017 19	Greenock Morton	1 – 1	Queen's Park	Greenock
19:30	Lewis Strapp 61'	report	Joseph Manderson 79'	Stadium: Cappielow Park; Referee: Ross Hardie

3 April 2017 20	Greenock Morton	3 – 0	Albion Rovers	Lennoxtown
20:00	Ben Armour 24'; Scott Tiffoney 63', 73'			Stadium: Lennoxtown training centre Referee: Matthew MacDermid

5 April 2017 21	Greenock Morton	2 – 0	Queen of the South	Greenock
19:30	Ben Eardley 15'; Scott Tiffoney 47'			Stadium: Cappielow Park; Referee: Craig King

==== Scottish Youth Cup ====
6 November 2016 3rd round	Greenock Morton	10 – 1	Banks O' Dee	Greenock
14:00	John Tennent (penalty missed); Ruaridh Langan; Thomas Orr; Scott Tiffoney; Jack Purdue; Mitchell Duffy; Blair Docherty	report	Mitch McPherson	Stadium: Cappielow Park; Referee: Connor Ashwood

4 December 2016 4th round	Motherwell	3 – 1	Greenock Morton	Airdrie
16:00	Barry Maguire (red card) 10'; David Turnbull 30' (pen.), 42' (pen.), 67'; Tom Fry (yellow card) 90+2' (red card)		Jack Purdue 78'	Stadium: Excelsior Stadium; Referee: Tony Fullerton

== League table ==
Pos	Team	Pld	W	D	L	GF	GA	GD	Pts	Promotion, qualification or relegation
2	Falkirk	36	16	12	8	58	40	+18	60	Qualification for the Premiership play-off semi-finals
3	Dundee United	36	15	12	9	50	42	+8	57	Qualification for the Premiership play-off quarter-finals
4	Greenock Morton	36	13	13	10	44	41	+3	52	Qualification for the Premiership play-off quarter-finals
5	Dunfermline Athletic	36	12	12	12	46	43	+3	48	
6	Queen of the South	36	11	10	15	46	52	−6	43	

Source: Soccerway
Rules for classification: 1) Points; 2) Goal difference; 3) Number of goals scored

== Player statistics ==
As of 13 May 2017

=== All competitions ===
Position	Player	Starts	Subs	Unused subs	Goals	Red cards (red card)	Yellow cards (yellow card)
FW	(Scotland) Ben Armour	0	1	0	0	0	0
FW	(Scotland) Luke Donnelly (on loan from Celtic)	2	5	8	0	0	0
DF	(Scotland) Michael Doyle	38	3	6	0	0	5
MF	(Scotland) Ross Forbes	45	1	1	12	0	8
GK	(Scotland) Derek Gaston	35	1	8	0	0	0
DF	(Republic of Ireland) Gavin Gunning	12	0	2	0	0	1
GK	(England) Bryn Halliwell (on loan from Gartcairn Juniors)	1	0	1	0	0	0
DF	(Scotland) Lee Kilday	25	6	7	4	0	5
DF	(Scotland) Ricki Lamie	33	4	4	1	0	3
MF	(Scotland) Ruaridh Langan	0	0	2	0	0	0
MF	(Scotland) Jamie Lindsay (on loan from Celtic)	39	2	2	3	0	9
MF	(Northern Ireland) Caolan McAleer	3	9	6	0	0	0
DF / FW	(Northern Ireland) Jamie McDonagh	26	12	6	2	1	9
GK	(Scotland) Jamie McGowan	1	1	23	0	0	1
GK	(Scotland) Andrew McNeil	12	1	14	0	0	0
DF	(Scotland) John Mitchell	0	0	2	0	0	0
MF	(Scotland) Andy Murdoch	31	2	2	1	0	2
FW	(Scotland) Aidan Nesbitt (on loan from Celtic)	28	9	2	1	0	0
DF / MF	(Scotland) Thomas O'Ware	48	0	0	11	0	4
FW	(Scotland) Gary Oliver	40	1	2	8	0	3
FW	(Scotland) Thomas Orr	0	3	7	0	0	0
FW	(England) Kudus Oyenuga	11	18	3	4	1	1
FW	(Scotland) Jai Quitongo	20	3	1	6	0	5
DF / MF	(Scotland) Mark Russell	36	4	5	1	1	4
FW	(Scotland) Jon Scullion	2	11	32	0	0	0
FW	(Scotland) Lawrence Shankland (on loan from Aberdeen)	14	4	0	4	0	1
MF	(Scotland) Dylan Stevenson	1	1	3	0	0	1
DF	(Scotland) Lewis Strapp	5	0	29	0	0	0
DF	(Scotland) John Tennent	0	0	5	0	0	0
MF	(Scotland) Michael Tidser	25	13	4	3	0	4
FW	(Scotland) Scott Tiffoney	5	12	16	0	0	1

=== Development squad goalscorers ===
Including goals from the Development League West (runners-up) and SFA Youth Cup

- Jon Scullion - 12
- Thomas Orr - 8
- Jack Purdue - 7
- Scott Tiffoney - 6
- Alex McWaters - 5
- Ruaridh Langan - 4
- Kudus Oyenuga, Lewis Strapp & Scott Miller - 3
- Ben Armour, Jamie McDonagh, Caolan McAleer & John Tennent - 2
- Michael Tidser, Mitchell Duffy, John Mitchell, Blair Docherty, Ben Eardley & Conor Pepper - 1

=== Awards ===
Last updated 16 November 2016

Nation	Name	Award	Month
(Scotland)	Thomas O'Ware	Championship Player of the Month	November 2016
(Scotland)	Jim Duffy	Championship Manager of the Month	November 2016
(Scotland)	Ross Forbes	Championship Player of the Month	January 2017
(Scotland)	Ross Forbes	Championship Player of the Year nominee	April 2017
(Scotland)	Jim Duffy	SPFL Manager of the Year nominee	May 2017
(Scotland)	Ross Forbes	PFA Scotland Championship Team of the Year	May 2017
(Scotland)	Thomas O'Ware	PFA Scotland Championship Team of the Year	May 2017
(Scotland)	Jim Duffy	Ladbrokes Championship Manager of the Season	May 2017
