= List of Northern Ireland football transfers summer 2023 =

This is a list of Northern Irish football transfers for the 2023 Summer Transfer Window.

== Sports Direct Premiership ==
=== Ballymena United ===
In:

No.	Pos.	Nation	Player
4	DF	NIR	Donal Rocks (on loan from Cliftonville)
6	DF	NIR	Colin Coates (from Cliftonville)
7	FW	NIR	Alex Gawne (from Coleraine)
14	FW	NIR	John McGuigan (from (Australia) St Albains Saints)
15	FW	IRL	Fiontan O'Boyle (loan return from Crumlin United)
16	MF	SCO	Fraser Taylor (on loan from (Scotland) St Mirren)
19	FW	IRL	Marc Walsh (from Dungannon Swifts)
20	MF	NIR	TJ Murray (from Ards)
22	DF	NIR	Caleb Crawford (loan return from Crusaders)
26	MF	NIR	Sam Johnston (loan return from Harland & Wolff Welders)
27	FW	NIR	Jonny McMurray (from Warrenpoint Town)

Out:

No.	Pos.	Nation	Player
—	DF	NIR	Nathan Clarke (to Newington)
—	DF	NIR	Craig Farquhar (to Larne)
—	DF	NIR	Robbie McVarnock (to Newington)
—	DF	NIR	Pierce Quigley (to Moyola Park)
—	MF	NIR	Jake Corbett (to Dundela)
—	MF	NIR	Joshua Kelly (to Glentoran)
—	MF	NIR	George Tipton (to Ards)
—	MF	IRL	Evan Tweed (on loan to Institute)
—	MF	NIR	Dougie Wilson (to (Republic of Ireland) Portadown)
—	FW	NIR	Kenny Kane (to Portadown)
—	FW	IRL	David McDaid (to Coleraine)
—	FW	NIR	David Parkhouse (Released, previously on loan at Cliftonville)

=== Carrick Rangers ===
In:

No.	Pos.	Nation	Player
24	FW	NIR	Daniel Purkis (from Glentoran)
—	DF	NIR	Lewis MacKinnon (from (Scotland) Rangers)

Out:

No.	Pos.	Nation	Player
22	FW	NIR	Stewart Nixon (on loan to Queen's University Belfast)
—	MF	NIR	Ronan Kalla (to Knockbreda)

=== Cliftonville ===
In:

No.	Pos.	Nation	Player
2	DF	IRL	Conor Pepper (from Linfield)
3	DF	NIR	Sean Stewart (on loan from (England) Norwich City)
5	DF	SCO	Luke Kenny (on loan from (Scotland) St Mirren)
15	DF	NIR	Reece Jordan (from Portadown)
20	FW	ENG	Sam Ashford (from (Scotland) Ayr United)
23	GK	IRL	David Odumosu (on loan from (Republic of Ireland) St Patrick's Athletic)
27	FW	NIR	Ben Wilson (from (England) Brighton & Hove Albion)

Out:

No.	Pos.	Nation	Player
11	FW	NIR	Jamie McDonagh (on loan to Glenavon)
12	DF	NIR	Seanna Foster (on loan to Bangor)
18	DF	NIR	Donal Rocks (on loan to Ballymena United)
21	MF	NIR	Gerard Storey (on loan to Lisburn Distillery)
—	DF	NIR	Colin Coates (to Ballymena United)
—	DF	NIR	Levi Ives (to Larne)
—	MF	IRL	Sean Moore (to (England) West Ham United)
—	FW	NIR	David Parkhouse (loan return to Ballymena United)

=== Coleraine ===
In:

No.	Pos.	Nation	Player
10	FW	IRL	David McDaid (from Ballymena United)

Out:

No.	Pos.	Nation	Player
33	FW	NIR	Luca Doherty (on loan to Limavady United)
—	DF	NIR	Conor McDermott (on loan to Lisburn Distillery)
—	MF	NIR	Ronan Wilson (to Harland & Wolff Welders)
—	FW	NIR	Alex Gawne (to Ballymena United)

=== Crusaders ===
In:

No.	Pos.	Nation	Player

Out:

No.	Pos.	Nation	Player
—	DF	NIR	Caleb Crawford (loan return to Ballymena United)

=== Dungannon Swifts ===
In:

No.	Pos.	Nation	Player

Out:

No.	Pos.	Nation	Player
—	FW	IRL	Marc Walsh (to Ballymena United)

=== Glenavon ===
In:

No.	Pos.	Nation	Player
27	FW	NIR	Jamie McDonagh (on loan from Cliftonville)

Out:

No.	Pos.	Nation	Player

=== Glentoran ===
In:

No.	Pos.	Nation	Player
20	MF	NIR	Joshua Kelly (from Ballymena United)

Out:

No.	Pos.	Nation	Player
—	MF	NIR	Terry Devlin (to (England) Portsmouth)
—	FW	NIR	Daniel Purkis (to Carrick Rangers)

=== Larne ===
In:

No.	Pos.	Nation	Player
5	DF	NIR	Craig Farquhar (from Ballymena United)
14	DF	NIR	Levi Ives (from Cliftonville)

Out:

No.	Pos.	Nation	Player
—	GK	ENG	Jamie Pardington (to (England) Cheltenham Town)

=== Linfield ===
In:

No.	Pos.	Nation	Player

Out:

No.	Pos.	Nation	Player
—	DF	IRL	Conor Pepper (to Cliftonville)

=== Loughgall ===
In:

No.	Pos.	Nation	Player

Out:

No.	Pos.	Nation	Player

=== Newry City ===
In:

No.	Pos.	Nation	Player

Out:

No.	Pos.	Nation	Player
