= Ben Armour =

Scottish footballer (born 1998)

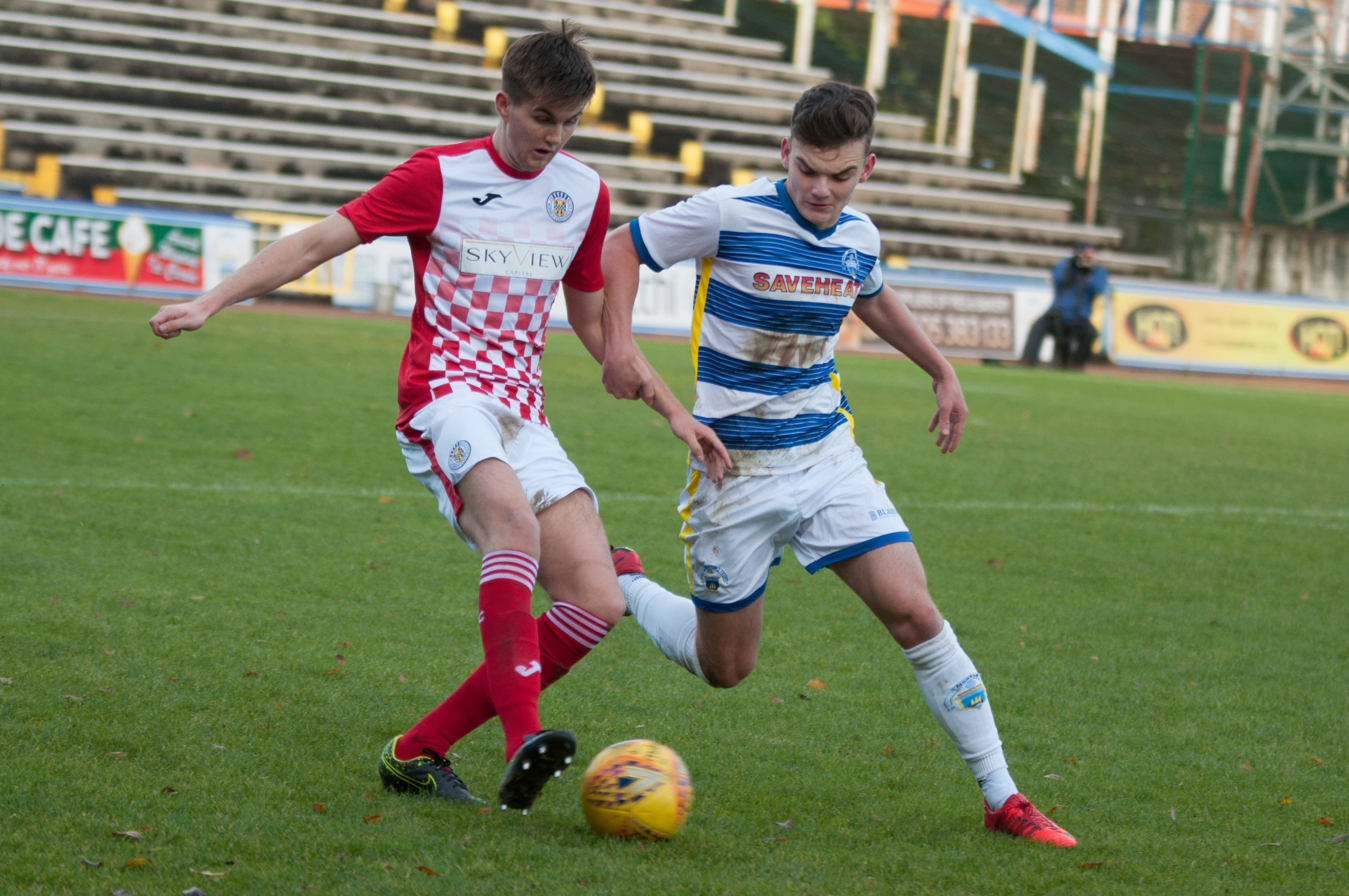
- Armour (right) in action for Morton Reserves against St Mirren

Personal information
- Date of birth: 17 April 1998 (age 28)
- Place of birth: Glasgow, Scotland
- Height: 1.81 m (5 ft 11 in)
- Position: Striker

Youth career
- Queen's Park
- Greenock Morton

Senior career*
Years	Team	Apps	(Gls)
2017–2019	Greenock Morton	9	(0)
2018	→ Annan Athletic (loan)	15	(0)
2019	→ Dumbarton (loan)	10	(0)
2019–2021	Peterhead	30	(5)
2021–2022	Alloa Athletic	3	(0)
2022–2023	Forfar Athletic	32	(9)
2023–2024	Stranraer	24	(3)
2024–2025	Peterhead	13	(1)
- * Club domestic league appearances and goals as of 31 May 2025

Ben Armour (born 17 April 1998) is a Scottish professional footballer who plays as a striker.

== Club career ==
Born in Glasgow, Scotland, Armour started his career with Queen's Park.

He then joined Morton's youth academy, before making his debut in April 2017 as a late substitute against Dunfermline Athletic.

Armour and goalkeeper Jamie McGowan signed a contract extension on 11 May 2017, for six months and one year respectively.

The young striker scored his first goal for the club after coming on as a substitute on 1 July 2017; tapping in a rebound from close range in a pre-season friendly with Stenhousemuir.

Armour signed a one-year contract in June 2018. A month later, Armour scored his first competitive goal for the club in a 5-0 home win against Albion Rovers in the Scottish League Cup group stage. He joined Scottish League One side Dumbarton on loan in January 2019, linking up with former manager Jim Duffy.

Armour left Morton in June 2019 and then signed a one-year contract with Peterhead.

He signed for Alloa Athletic in June 2021.

In June 2022, Armour signed with Scottish League Two side Forfar Athletic on a one-year deal.

== Career statistics ==
As of match played 26 February 2022

Appearances and goals by club, season and competition
Club	Season	League			Scottish Cup		League Cup		Other		Total	
Club	Season	Division	Apps	Goals	Apps	Goals	Apps	Goals	Apps	Goals	Apps	Goals
Greenock Morton	2016–17	Scottish Championship	1	0	0	0	0	0	0	0	1	0
Greenock Morton	2017–18	Scottish Championship	7	0	0	0	1	0	0	0	8	0
Greenock Morton	2018–19	Scottish Championship	1	0	1	0	3	1	1	0	6	1
Greenock Morton	Total		9	0	1	0	4	1	1	0	15	1
Annan Athletic (loan)	2017–18	Scottish League Two	15	0	0	0	0	0	0	0	15	0
Dumbarton (loan)	2018–19	Scottish League One	10	0	0	0	0	0	0	0	10	0
Peterhead	2019–20	Scottish League One	18	1	1	0	4	1	1	0	24	2
Peterhead	2020–21	Scottish League One	12	4	1	0	4	0	0	0	17	4
Peterhead	Total		30	5	2	0	8	1	1	0	41	6
Alloa Athletic	2021–22	Scottish League One	3	0	0	0	4	0	1	0	8	0
Forfar Athletic	2022–23	Scottish League Two	0	0	0	0	0	0	0	0	0	0
Career Total			67	5	3	0	16	2	3	0	89	7
