= Kudus Oyenuga =

English footballer

Personal information
- Full name: Olalekan Kudus Oyenuga
- Date of birth: 18 March 1993 (age 33)
- Place of birth: Walthamstow, England
- Position: Striker

Youth career
- 2008–2011: Tottenham Hotspur

Senior career*
Years	Team	Apps	(Gls)
2011–2012	Tottenham Hotspur	0	(0)
2011	→ MyPa (loan)	3	(0)
2011	→ Bury (loan)	1	(0)
2012	→ St Johnstone (loan)	1	(0)
2012–2013	Hayes & Yeading United	36	(15)
2013–2015	Dundee United	1	(0)
2014	→ Boreham Wood (loan)	16	(3)
2014–2015	→ Cowdenbeath (loan)	28	(6)
2015–2016	Hartlepool United	8	(1)
2016–2017	Greenock Morton	24	(4)
2017–2018	Chelmsford City	33	(10)
2018–2019	Dartford	21	(1)
2019	→ Haringey Borough (loan)	10	(1)
2019	Welling United	0	(0)
2019–2020	Margate	15	(5)
2020	Leatherhead	1	(0)
2020–2021	Brentwood Town	2	(0)
2021	Grays Athletic	7	(0)
2021	Coggeshall Town	9	(2)
2022	Basildon United	7	(0)
2022–2023	Southend Manor	9	(1)
2023–2024	Burnham Ramblers	18	(5)

Managerial career
- 2022–2023: Southend Manor
- 2023–2024: Burnham Ramblers
- * Club domestic league appearances and goals as of 16:30, 7 January 2024 (UTC)

Olalekan Kudus Oyenuga (born 18 March 1993) is an English footballer, who plays as a forward. He was most recently player-manager at Burnham Ramblers.

He has played for Tottenham Hotspur, Hayes & Yeading United, Dundee United, Hartlepool United and Greenock Morton. He has also played for MyPa, Bury, St Johnstone, Boreham Wood, Dartford and Cowdenbeath on loan.

== Playing career ==
Oyenuga was born in Walthamstow and began his football career by joining the Tottenham Hotspur academy in 2008. In April 2011, Oyenuga agreed a two-year deal with Tottenham and then went out on loan to Finnish side MyPa, until the end of August 2011.

On 15 August 2011, he joined Bury on loan for a month, making one appearance, coming on as a substitute, in a 2–1 loss against Charlton on 28 August 2011. Afterwards, he left Bury. In November, Oyenuga went on trial with Southampton after scoring twice in a reserve match in a 4–1 win over Plymouth Argyle, but no move was made.

In the January 2012 transfer window, Oyenuga joined Scottish Premier League side St Johnstone on loan, until the end of the season. On 14 February he made his St Johnstone debut, coming on as a substitute in extra time, in a 2–1 loss against Hearts in a fifth round replay in the Scottish Cup. Two months later, he made his league debut, coming on as a substitute, in a 2–0 loss against Celtic. At the end of the season, Oyenuga returned to Tottenham and was soon released by the club.

In August 2012, Oyenuga joined Hayes & Yeading United. He established himself in the first team, making 40 appearances and scoring eighteen in all competitions. In addition, he was the club's top-scorer and helped the club avoid relegation. At the end of the season it was thought that Oyenuga might leave the club. The club then granted permission for him to leave the club.

After leaving Hayes & Yeading United, Kudus returned to Scotland, joining Dundee United on trial, along with former teammate Calum Butcher. After impressing manager Jackie McNamara during their trial, both players subsequently joined the club, Oyenuga signing a three-year contract. On 22 September 2013, he made his Dundee United debut, coming on as a substitute against Motherwell.

In January 2014, Oyenuga joined Boreham Wood on loan until the end of the season. On 25 August 2014, he was loaned out again, this time to Scottish Championship club Cowdenbeath until January 2015, later extended for the rest of the 2014–15 season. On 13 May 2015, he was released by Dundee United.

On 6 July 2015, Oyenuga signed for Hartlepool United on a free transfer, becoming their eighth signing of the summer. He scored his first goal for Hartlepool in a 1–0 FA Cup win against Cheltenham Town on 7 November 2015. A week later he scored his first league goal in a 3–1 win over Leyton Orient.

On 4 May 2016, Oyenuga was named as one of three players released by Hartlepool United, and went on trial at Livingston and then Greenock Morton. After his trial match for Morton, Oyenuga signed a five-month contract with the club. He scored his first goal for Morton in a 1–1 draw with Dumbarton on 20 August 2016. In late December, Oyenuga would sign a contract to keep him at the club until the end of the season. He was released at the end of his contract.

In June 2017, Oyenuga signed for Chelmsford City. On 5 August 2017, Oyenuga scored twice on his debut for the club in a 2–0 win against Gloucester City. In June 2018, Oyenuga signed for Dartford. On 15 February 2019, Oyenuga joined Haringey Borough on an initial month's loan. On 19 June 2019, Oyenuga joined Welling United. Before playing a single game for Welling United, Oyenuga joined Margate. He left the club on 6 January 2020 and joined Leatherhead. In July 2021, Oyenuga signed for Grays Athletic. In November 2021, Oyenuga signed for Coggeshall Town. In March 2022, Oyenuga signed for Basildon United.

== Managerial career ==
In October 2022, Oyenuga was appointed assistant manager at Southend Manor, whilst also holding a playing role at the club. In December 2022, Oyenuga was named as Southend Manor manager alongside Jack Morris. On 25 March 2023, Oyenuga resigned as manager of Southend Manor, also leaving the club as a player.

On 13 May 2023, Burnham Ramblers announced the appointment of Oyenuga as manager. On 7 January 2024, Burnham Ramblers announced Oyenuga had departed the club.

Following his time at Burnham Ramblers, Oyenuga was involved in coaching Chido Obi, following his move from Arsenal to Manchester United.

== Career statistics ==
As of match played 4 October 2020

Appearances and goals by club, season and competition
Club	Season	League			National Cup		League Cup		Other		Total	
Club	Season	Division	Apps	Goals	Apps	Goals	Apps	Goals	Apps	Goals	Apps	Goals
Tottenham Hotspur	2011–12	Premier League	0	0	0	0	0	0	0	0	0	0
MyPa (loan)	2011	Veikkausliiga	3	0	1	0	0	0	0	0	4	0
Bury (loan)	2011–12	League One	1	0	0	0	1	0	1 (Note: Appearances in the Football League Trophy)	0	3	0
St Johnstone	2011–12	Scottish Premier League	1	0	1	0	0	0	—		2	0
Hayes & Yeading United	2012–13	Conference South	36	15	1	0	—		1 (Note: Appearance in the FA Trophy)	0	38	15
Dundee United	2013–14	Scottish Premiership	1	0	0	0	0	0	—		1	0
Boreham Wood (loan)	2013–14	Conference South	16	3	0	0	—		0	0	16	3
Cowdenbeath (loan)	2014–15	Scottish Championship	28	6	2	0	1	0	0	0	31	6
Hartlepool United	2015–16	League Two	8	1	1	1	0	0	0	0	9	2
Greenock Morton	2016–17	Scottish Championship	24	4	1	0	2	0	3 (Note: One appearance in the Scottish Challenge Cup and two in the Scottish Premiership play-offs)	0	30	4
Chelmsford City	2017–18	National League South	33	10	4	0	—		2	0	39	10
Dartford	2018–19	National League South	21	1	0	0	—		3 (Note: Appearance(s) in Kent Senior Cup)	1	24	2
Haringey Borough (loan)	2018–19	Isthmian League Premier Division	10	1	—		—		1 (Note: Appearance in the Isthmian League Premier Division Play-Offs)	1	11	2
Welling United	2019–20	National League South	0	0	0	0	—		0	0	0	0
Margate	2019–20	Isthmian League Premier Division	15	5	0	0	—		0	0	15	5
Leatherhead	2019–20	Isthmian League Premier Division	1	0	0	0	—		0	0	1	0
Brentwood Town	2020–21	Isthmian League North Division	2	0	3	1	—		0	0	5	1
Career total			200	45	14	2	4	0	11	2	229	49
