= Caolan McAleer =

Northern Irish footballer

Personal information
- Date of birth: 19 August 1993 (age 33)
- Place of birth: Strabane, Northern Ireland
- Height: 1.73 m (5 ft 8 in)
- Position: Winger

Team information
- Current team: Dungannon Swifts
- Number: 23

Youth career
- Linfield

Senior career*
Years	Team	Apps	(Gls)
2012–2014	Partick Thistle	1	(0)
2012–2013	→ Arthurlie (loan)		
2013–2014	→ Airdrieonians (loan)	20	(3)
2014–2015	East Fife	16	(3)
2015–2016	Airdrieonians	9	(0)
2016	→ Kilbirnie Ladeside (loan)		
2016	Greenock Morton	5	(0)
2017	Finn Harps	29	(4)
2018	Sligo Rovers	32	(4)
2019	Finn Harps	24	(3)
2020–2022	Dungannon Swifts	31	(0)
2022–	Loughgall		
- * Club domestic league appearances and goals as of 13:48, 15 February 2022 (UTC)

Caolan McAleer (born 19 August 1993) is a Northern Irish professional footballer who plays for Loughgall as a winger.

== Early and personal life ==
McAleer comes from Strabane, and attended Christian Brothers Grammar School, Omagh.

== Club career ==
McAleer moved from Linfield to Scottish club Partick Thistle in January 2012. After making his debut for them in May 2012, McAleer signed a new two-year contract in July 2012, before going on loan to Arthurlie. Later that month, McAleer participated in the 2012 Milk Cup. On 2 October 2013, Partick Thistle announced that McAleer would join Scottish League Two side Albion Rovers on loan until 6 January 2014. However, the loan deal broke down two days later, and he moved on loan to Airdrieonians on 21 November 2013.

On 5 June 2014, McAleer signed for East Fife. After one season with The Fifers, McAleer returned to Airdrieonians, signing a contract with the club in June 2015. In January 2016, McAleer moved on loan to Kilbirnie Ladeside until the end of the season.

In July 2016, McAleer signed for Greenock Morton. McAleer was released in mid-December 2016. From here he moved to the Republic of Ireland to join Finn Harps in January 2017. He spent the 2018 season with Sligo Rovers.

After one season, McAleer returned to Finn Harps for the 2019 season. On 13 December 2019 it was confirmed that McAleer would join Dungannon Swifts on 1 January 2020 on a deal until the summer 2021. He moved to Loughgall in January 2022.

== International career ==
McAleer played for Northern Ireland at Schools Under-18 level in the Centenary Shield.

== Career statistics ==
As of 10 May 2019

Appearances and goals by club, season and competition
Club	Season	League		FA Cup		League Cup		Other		Total	
Club	Season	Apps	Goals	Apps	Goals	Apps	Goals	Apps	Goals	Apps	Goals
Partick Thistle	2011–12	1	0	0	0	0	0	0	0	1	0
Partick Thistle	2012–13	0	0	0	0	0	0	0	0	0	0
Partick Thistle	2013–14	0	0	0	0	0	0	0	0	0	0
Partick Thistle	Total	1	0	0	0	0	0	0	0	1	0
Airdrieonians (loan)	2013–14	20	3	0	0	0	0	0	0	20	3
East Fife	2014–15	16	3	2	1	1	0	3	0	22	4
Airdrieonians	2015–16	9	0	0	0	0	0	1	0	10	0
Greenock Morton	2016–17	5	0	1	0	5	0	1	0	12	0
Finn Harps	2017	29	4	1	0	2	0	0	0	32	4
Finn Harps	2019	16	3	1	0	0	0	0	0	17	3
Career total		80	10	4	1	8	0	5	0	97	11
