= 2011–12 Tottenham Hotspur F.C. season =

English football club season

Tottenham Hotspur F.C.
2011–12 season
- Owner: ENIC International Ltd.
- Chairman: Daniel Levy
- Manager: Harry Redknapp
- Stadium: White Hart Lane
- Premier League: 4th
- FA Cup: Semi-finals
- League Cup: Third round
- UEFA Europa League: Group stage
- Top goalscorer: League: Emmanuel Adebayor (17); All: Emmanuel Adebayor (18)
- Highest home attendance: 36,274 vs. Arsenal (2 October 2011, Premier League)
- Lowest home attendance: 24,058 vs. Rubin Kazan (20 October 2011, UEFA Europa League)
| Home colours | Away colours | Third colours |

The 2011–12 season was Tottenham Hotspur's 20th season in the Premier League and 34th successive season in the top division of the English football league system.

The campaign featured Tottenham's 10th appearance in the UEFA Europa League (formerly the UEFA Cup), entering the Play-off Qualifying round due to finishing fifth in the 2010–11 Premier League season. They reached the group stage by defeating Hearts over two legs, but finished third in their group and therefore didn't make the knockout stages of the tournament. The club entered the League Cup in the third round and were defeated by Stoke City on penalties, as well as the FA Cup where they reached the semi-finals but were defeated 5–1 by Chelsea.

Tottenham finished the season in fourth place after occupying third place for the majority of the season however did not qualify for the Champions League as Chelsea won the 2011-12 campaign costing Tottenham their place in the tournament. Their last game of the Premier League season was a 2–0 victory against Fulham.

This was the first season not to feature Robbie Keane since 2001–02 and 2008–09 who departed to join LA Galaxy, although Keane returned for his second spell from Liverpool during the following campaign

== Squad list ==
=== First-team squad ===
As of 14 February 2012.

Note: Flags indicate national team as defined under FIFA eligibility rules; some limited exceptions apply. Players may hold more than one non-FIFA nationality.

| No. | Pos. | Nation | Player |
|---|---|---|---|
| 1 | GK | BRA | Heurelho Gomes |
| 3 | MF | WAL | Gareth Bale |
| 4 | DF | FRA | Younès Kaboul |
| 6 | MF | ENG | Tom Huddlestone |
| 7 | MF | ENG | Aaron Lennon |
| 8 | MF | ENG | Scott Parker |
| 10 | FW | TOG | Emmanuel Adebayor (on loan from Manchester City) |
| 11 | MF | NED | Rafael van der Vaart |
| 13 | DF | FRA | William Gallas (2nd vice-captain) |
| 14 | MF | CRO | Luka Modrić |
| 15 | FW | FRA | Louis Saha |
| 17 | FW | MEX | Giovani dos Santos |
| 18 | FW | ENG | Jermain Defoe |

| No. | Pos. | Nation | Player |
|---|---|---|---|
| 20 | DF | ENG | Michael Dawson (vice captain) |
| 21 | MF | CRO | Niko Kranjčar |
| 23 | GK | ITA | Carlo Cudicini |
| 24 | GK | USA | Brad Friedel |
| 25 | MF | ENG | Danny Rose |
| 26 | DF | ENG | Ledley King (captain) |
| 28 | DF | ENG | Kyle Walker |
| 29 | MF | ENG | Jake Livermore |
| 30 | MF | BRA | Sandro |
| 32 | DF | CMR | Benoît Assou-Ekotto |
| 33 | DF | NZL | Ryan Nelsen |
| 36 | DF | RSA | Bongani Khumalo |
| 38 | MF | ENG | David Bentley |

=== Reserve squad ===
Note: Flags indicate national team as defined under FIFA eligibility rules; some limited exceptions apply. Players may hold more than one non-FIFA nationality.

| No. | Pos. | Nation | Player |
|---|---|---|---|
| 35 | GK | ENG | David Button |
| 37 | FW | ENG | Harry Kane |
| 43 | MF | ENG | Ryan Fredericks |
| 44 | MF | ESP | Cristian Ceballos |
| 45 | MF | AUS | Massimo Luongo |
| 46 | MF | ENG | Tom Carroll |
| 47 | MF | ENG | Jake Nicholson |
| 51 | DF | ENG | Adam Smith |

| No. | Pos. | Nation | Player |
|---|---|---|---|
| 53 | FW | ENG | Cameron Lancaster |
| 54 | FW | ENG | Alex Pritchard |
| 56 | MF | ENG | Jesse Waller-Lassen |
| 57 | GK | SCO | Jordan Archer |
| 58 | MF | ENG | Dean Parrett |
| 59 | DF | ENG | Kevin Stewart |
| 60 | DF | ENG | Jack Barthram |

== Transfers ==
=== In ===
| Date | Player | Previous club | Cost |
|---|---|---|---|
| 3 June 2011 | (United States) Brad Friedel | Aston Villa | Free |
| 11 July 2011 | (Spain) Cristian Ceballos | Free agent | Free |
| 18 July 2011 | (Ivory Coast) Souleymane Coulibaly | Siena | Undisclosed |
| 31 August 2011 | (England) Scott Parker | West Ham United | £5.5 million |
| 16 January 2012 | (Spain) Iago Falque | Juventus | Undisclosed |
| 31 January 2012 | (France) Louis Saha | Everton | Free |
| 2 February 2012 | (New Zealand) Ryan Nelsen | Free Agent | Free |

=== Loaned in ===
| Date | Player | Club | Return Date |
|---|---|---|---|
| 25 August 2011 | (Spain) Iago Falque | Juventus | Transferred January 2012 |
| 25 August 2011 | (Togo) Emmanuel Adebayor | Manchester City | End of 2011–12 season |
| 15 February 2012 | (Brazil) Bruno Uvini | São Paulo | April 2012 |

=== Out ===
| Date | Player | New Club | Cost |
|---|---|---|---|
| 16 June 2011 | (England) Jonathan Woodgate | Stoke City | Released |
| 21 June 2011 | (England) Jamie O'Hara | Wolverhampton Wanderers | £5 million |
| 19 July 2011 | (Belgium) Paul-José M'Poku | Standard Liège | Undisclosed |
| 15 August 2011 | (Republic of Ireland) Robbie Keane | LA Galaxy | £3.5 million |
| 31 August 2011 | (Scotland) Callum Tapping | Hearts | Undisclosed |
| 31 August 2011 | (Honduras) Wilson Palacios | Stoke City | £6 million |
| 31 August 2011 | (Scotland) Alan Hutton | Aston Villa | £3 million |
| 31 August 2011 | (England) Peter Crouch | Stoke City | £12 million |
| 31 January 2012 | (Russia) Roman Pavlyuchenko | Lokomotiv Moscow | £8 million |

=== Loaned out ===
| Date | Player | Club | Return Date |
|---|---|---|---|
| 1 July 2011 | (England) Steven Caulker | Swansea City | End of 2011–12 season |
| 21 July 2011 | (England) Kyle Naughton | Norwich City | End of 2011–12 season |
| 28 July 2011 | (England) Nathan Byrne | AFC Bournemouth | End of 2011–12 season |
| 28 July 2011 | (England) Ryan Mason | Doncaster Rovers | End of 2011–12 season |
| 4 August 2011 | (England) Jonathan Obika | Yeovil Town | End of 2011–12 season |
| 8 August 2011 | (Italy) Mirko Ranieri | Esperia | End of 2011–12 season |
| 31 August 2011 | (England) Jermaine Jenas | Aston Villa | End of 2011–12 season |
| 30 September 2011 | (Scotland) Jordan Archer | Bishop's Stortford | End of 2011–12 season |
| 29 December 2011 | (England) Harry Kane | Millwall | End of 2011–12 season |
| 29 December 2011 | (England) Ryan Mason | Millwall | End of 2011–12 season |
| 13 January 2012 | (England) Dean Parrett | Yeovil Town | End of 2011–12 season |
| 16 January 2012 | (Spain) Iago Falque | Southampton | End of 2011–12 season |
| 30 January 2012 | (England) Tom Carroll | Derby County | End of 2011–12 season |
| 30 January 2012 | (England) Kudus Oyenuga | St Johnstone | End of 2011–12 season |
| 31 January 2012 | (England) Adam Smith | Leeds United | End of 2011–12 season |
| 31 January 2012 | (Croatia) Vedran Ćorluka | Bayer Leverkusen | End of 2011–12 season |
| 31 January 2012 | (Cameroon) Sébastien Bassong | Wolverhampton Wanderers | End of 2011–12 season |
| 31 January 2012 | (South Africa) Steven Pienaar | Everton | End of 2011–12 season |
| 14 February 2012 | (England) Simon Dawkins | San Jose Earthquakes | June 2012 |
| 18 February 2012 | (Sweden) Oscar Jansson | Shamrock Rovers | June 2012 |
| 24 February 2012 | (England) Andros Townsend | Birmingham City | End of 2011–12 season |
| 19 March 2012 | (England) David Button | Barnsley | April 2012 |
| 22 March 2012 | (England) John Bostock | Swindon Town | End of 2011–12 season |

=== Completed loans ===
| Date | Player | Club | Return Date |
|---|---|---|---|
| 8 August 2011 | (Sweden) Oscar Jansson | Bradford City | September 2011 |
| 15 August 2011 | (England) Kudus Oyenuga | Bury | September 2011 |
| 16 August 2011 | (England) Adam Smith | MK Dons | 31 January 2012 |
| 25 August 2011 | (England) David Button | Leyton Orient | January 2012 |
| 31 August 2011 | (England) David Bentley | West Ham United | October 2011 |
| 9 September 2011 | (England) Ben Alnwick | Leyton Orient | December 2011 |
| 25 July 2011 | (South Africa) Bongani Khumalo | Reading | 31 January 2012 |
| 1 January 2012 | (England) Andros Townsend | Leeds United | February 2012 |
| 1 January 2012 | (England) David Button | Doncaster Rovers | February 2012 |
| 30 January 2012 | (England) John Bostock | Sheffield Wednesday | March 2012 |

== Match results ==
=== Spurs XI ===
| Date | Opponents | H / A | Result (H/A) | Scorers | Attendance |
|---|---|---|---|---|---|
| 23 July 2011 | Barnet | A | 3 - 2 | Kane 55'(pen), Obika 70' | 1,582 |
| 23 July 2011 | MK Dons | A | 3 - 5 | Pavlyuchenko 8', 36', Kane 78', 90', Kranjčar 83' | 16,189 |
| 29 July 2011 | Leyton Orient | A | 1 - 4 | Crouch 22', 34', Cuthbert (o.g.) 50', Kranjčar 70' |
| 9 August 2011 | Birmingham XI | H | 6 - 3 | Kane 25', 34', ?', Bostock ?', Carroll ?', Coulibaly ?' |
| 7 September 2011 | Kettering Town | A | 4 - 5 | Falque 20', 73', Ceballos 22', 64', Bostock 66' | 874 |
| 12 September 2011 | West Ham XI | H | 2 - 2 | Lancaster 8', Parrett 72' |
| 4 October 2011 | Leyton Orient | H | 3 - 1 | Lancaster 19', Bostock 27' (pen), Stewart 55' |
| 11 October 2011 | Queens Park Rangers | A | 2 - 2 | Coulibaly 27', Falque 44' |
| 24 October 2011 | West Ham XI | A | 2 - 5 | Parrett 20', Falque 27', Kane ?', ?', Ceballos 77' |
| 2 November 2011 | Crystal Palace XI | H | 1 - 3 | Ceballos 76' (pen.) |
| 7 November 2011 | Ipswich Town | H | 1 - 3 | Lancaster 86' |
| 16 November 2011 | Enfield Town | A | 2 - 1 | Obika 47' |
| 30 November 2011 | Sports & Future Football Academy | H | 7 - 2 | Bostock ?', Mason 15', ?', 61', ?', Lancaster ?', Luongo 85' |
| 13 December 2011 | Queens Park Rangers XI | A | 2 - 6 | Dawkins 9', Mason ?', ?', Lancaster 65', Ceballos ?', Oyenuga ?' |
| 11 January 2012 | Queens Park Rangers XI | A | 2 - 2 | Parrett 60', Lancaster ?' |
| 17 January 2012 | Celtic XI | H | 4 - 1 | Lancaster 14' (pen.), Dos Santos 20', Bostock 31', ?' (pen.) |
| 24 January 2012 | Leyton Orient XI | H | 2 - 3 | Dawkins 34', Coulibaly 74' |
| 21 February 2012 | Leyton Orient XI | H | 7 - 3 | Lancaster 6', 50', 57', Luongo 27', Ekong 64', Ceballos ?', Dawkins 90' |
| 28 February 2012 | Nike Academy | H | 2 - 0 | Ceballos 20', Byrne 65' |
| 6 March 2012 | Southampton XI | H | 2 - 3 | Coulibaly 44', 55' |
| 13 March 2012 | Brighton XI | H | 1 - 4 | Pritchard 17' |

=== Pre-season ===
| Date | Opponents | H / A | Result (H/A) | Scorers | Attendance |
|---|---|---|---|---|---|
| 16 July 2011 | Kaizer Chiefs | A | 1 – 0 | | n/a |
| 19 July 2011 | Orlando Pirates | A | 1 – 1 | Van der Vaart 17' | n/a |
| 23 July 2011 | Orlando Pirates | A | 0 - 3 | Van der Vaart 34', 52', Defoe 88' | 38,777 |
| 30 July 2011 | Brighton & Hove Albion | A | 2 - 3 | Kaboul 42', Ćorluka 44', Livermore 69' |
| 6 August 2011 | Athletic Club Bilbao | H | 2 - 1 | Crouch 49' Defoe 52' |

=== Premier League ===
==== League table ====
| Pos | Team | Pld | W | D | L | GF | GA | GD | Pts | Qualification or relegation |
|---|---|---|---|---|---|---|---|---|---|---|
| 2 | Manchester United | 38 | 28 | 5 | 5 | 89 | 33 | +56 | 89 | Qualification for the Champions League group stage |
| 3 | Arsenal | 38 | 21 | 7 | 10 | 74 | 49 | +25 | 70 | Qualification for the Champions League group stage |
| 4 | Tottenham Hotspur | 38 | 20 | 9 | 9 | 66 | 41 | +25 | 69 | Qualification for the Europa League group stage (Note: Chelsea won the Champions League and thus qualified for the group stage as defending champions, forfeiting their spot in the Europa League as the FA Cup winners. This meant that Tottenham were to compete in the Europa League group stage, since, pursuant to the rules, only four clubs from the Premier League could play in the Champions League.) |
| 5 | Newcastle United | 38 | 19 | 8 | 11 | 56 | 51 | +5 | 65 | Qualification for the Europa League play-off round |
| 6 | Chelsea | 38 | 18 | 10 | 10 | 65 | 46 | +19 | 64 | Qualification for the Champions League group stage |

Source: Barclays Premier League
Rules for classification: 1) points; 2) goal difference; 3) number of goals scored.

==== Matches ====
| 22 August 2011 1 | Manchester United | 3–0 | Tottenham Hotspur | Manchester |
| 20:00 GMT | Welbeck 61'; Anderson 76'; Rooney 87' | Report | | Stadium: Old Trafford; Attendance: 75,498; Referee: Lee Probert |

| 28 August 2011 2 | Tottenham Hotspur | 1–5 | Manchester City | London |
| 13:30 GMT | Kaboul 68' | Report | Džeko 34', 41', 55', 90+3'; Agüero 60' | Stadium: White Hart Lane; Attendance: 36,150; Referee: Phil Dowd |

| 10 September 2011 3 | Wolverhampton Wanderers | 0–2 | Tottenham Hotspur | Wolverhampton |
| 15:00 GMT | | Report | Adebayor 67'; Defoe 80' | Stadium: Molineux Stadium; Attendance: 25,274; Referee: Walton |

| 18 September 2011 4 | Tottenham Hotspur | 4–0 | Liverpool | London |
| 13:30 GMT | Modrić 7'; Defoe 66'; Adebayor 68', 90+3' | Report | Adam (yellow card) 12' (yellow-red card) 28'; Škrtel (yellow card) 36' (yellow-red card) 63' | Stadium: White Hart Lane; Attendance: 36,129; Referee: Mike Jones |

| 24 September 2011 5 | Wigan Athletic | 1–2 | Tottenham Hotspur | Wigan |
| 15:00 GMT | Diamé 50' | Report | Van der Vaart 3'; Bale 23' | Stadium: DW Stadium; Attendance: 18,778; Referee: Jonathan Moss |

| 2 October 2011 6 | Tottenham Hotspur | 2–1 | Arsenal | London |
| 16:00 GMT | Van der Vaart 40'; Walker 73' | Report | Ramsey 51' | Stadium: White Hart Lane; Attendance: 36,274; Referee: Mike Dean |

| 16 October 2011 7 | Newcastle United | 2–2 | Tottenham Hotspur | Newcastle upon Tyne |
| 16:00 GMT | Ba 48'; Sh. Ameobi 86' | Report | Van der Vaart 40' (pen.); Defoe 68' | Stadium: St James' Park; Attendance: 46,420; Referee: Lee Probert |

| 23 October 2011 8 | Blackburn Rovers | 1–2 | Tottenham Hotspur | Blackburn |
| 15:00 GMT | Formica 28' | Report | van der Vaart 15', 53' | Stadium: Ewood Park; Attendance: 22,786; Referee: Stuart Attwell |

| 30 October 2011 9 | Tottenham Hotspur | 3–1 | Queens Park Rangers | London |
| 16:00 GMT | Bale 20', 72'; Van der Vaart 33' | Report | Bothroyd 62' | Stadium: White Hart Lane; Attendance: 36,147; Referee: Howard Webb |

| 6 November 2011 10 | Fulham | 1–3 | Tottenham Hotspur | London |
| 16:00 GMT | Kaboul 57' (o.g.) | Report | Baird 10' (o.g.); Lennon 45+3'; Kaboul (yellow card) 69'; Defoe 90+5' | Stadium: Craven Cottage; Attendance: 25,698; Referee: Peter Walton |

| 21 November 2011 11 | Tottenham Hotspur | 2–0 | Aston Villa | London |
| 20:00 GMT | Adebayor 14', 40' | Report | | Stadium: White Hart Lane; Attendance: 35,818; Referee: Mark Halsey |

| 26 November 2011 12 | West Bromwich Albion | 1–3 | Tottenham Hotspur | West Bromwich |
| 15:00 GMT | Mulumbu 8' | Report | Adebayor 25', 90+3'; Defoe 81' | Stadium: The Hawthorns; Attendance: 24,801; Referee: Lee Probert |

| 3 December 2011 13 | Tottenham Hotspur | 3–0 | Bolton Wanderers | London |
| 15:00 GMT | Bale 7'; Lennon 50'; Defoe 61' | Report | | Stadium: White Hart Lane; Attendance: 35,896; Referee: Stuart Attwell |

| 11 December 2011 14 | Stoke City | 2–1 | Tottenham Hotspur | Stoke-on-Trent |
| 16:00 GMT | Etherington 13', 43' | Report | Adebayor 62' (pen.) | Stadium: Britannia Stadium; Attendance: 27,529; Referee: Chris Foy |

| 18 December 2011 15 | Tottenham Hotspur | 1–0 | Sunderland | London |
| 15:00 GMT | Pavlyuchenko 61' | Report | | Stadium: White Hart Lane; Attendance: 36,021; Referee: Mike Dean |

| 22 December 2011 16 | Tottenham Hotspur | 1–1 | Chelsea | London |
| 20:00 GMT | Adebayor 8', (yellow card) 19'; Bale (yellow card) 70' | Report | (yellow card) 12' Ivanović; 23' Sturridge; (yellow card) 42' Ramires | Stadium: White Hart Lane; Attendance: 36,141; Referee: Howard Webb |

| 27 December 2011 17 | Norwich City | 0–2 | Tottenham Hotspur | Norwich, Norfolk |
| 19:30 GMT | Whitbread (yellow card) 69' | Report | Gallas (yellow card) 52'; Bale 55', 67' | Stadium: Carrow Road; Attendance: 26,807; Referee: Michael Oliver |

| 31 December 2011 18 | Swansea City | 1–1 | Tottenham Hotspur | Swansea |
| 15:00 GMT | Richards (yellow card) 15'; Sinclair 84' | Report | Bale (yellow card) 41' van der Vaart 44'; Livermore (yellow card) 88' | Stadium: Liberty Stadium; Attendance: 20,393; Referee: Phil Dowd |

| 3 January 2012 19 | Tottenham Hotspur | 1–0 | West Bromwich Albion | London |
| 19:45 GMT | Defoe 63' | Report | | Stadium: White Hart Lane; Attendance: 36,062; Referee: Mark Halsey |

| 11 January 2012 20 | Tottenham Hotspur | 2–0 | Everton | London, England |
| 19:45 GMT | Lennon 35', (yellow card) 74'; Assou-Ekotto 63' | Report | Donovan (yellow card) 45+2'; Cahill (yellow card) 83'; Fellaini (yellow card) 85' | Stadium: White Hart Lane; Attendance: 36,132; Referee: Martin Atkinson |

| 14 January 2012 21 | Tottenham Hotspur | 1–1 | Wolverhampton Wanderers | London |
| 15:00 GMT | Modrić 51' | Report | Fletcher 22' | Stadium: White Hart Lane; Attendance: 36,194; Referee: Mike Jones |

| 22 January 2012 22 | Manchester City | 3–2 | Tottenham Hotspur | Manchester |
| 13:30 GMT | Nasri 56'; Lescott 59'; Balotelli 90+5' (pen.) | Report | Defoe 60'; Bale 65' | Stadium: Etihad Stadium; Attendance: 47,422; Referee: Howard Webb |

| 31 January 2012 23 | Tottenham Hotspur | 3–1 | Wigan Athletic | London |
| 20:00 GMT | Bale 29', 64'; Modrić 34' | Report | McArthur 80' | Stadium: White Hart Lane; Attendance: 35,801; Referee: Lee Probert |

| 6 February 2012 24 | Liverpool | 0–0 | Tottenham Hotspur | Liverpool |
| 20:00 GMT | | Report | | Stadium: Anfield; Attendance: 44,461; Referee: Mike Oliver |

| 11 February 2012 25 | Tottenham Hotspur | 5–0 | Newcastle United | London |
| 17:30 GMT | Assou-Ekotto 4'; Saha 6', 20'; Kranjčar 34'; Adebayor 64' | Report | | Stadium: White Hart Lane; Attendance: 36,176; Referee: Andre Marriner |

| 26 February 2012 26 | Arsenal | 5–2 | Tottenham Hotspur | London |
| 13:30 GMT | Koscielny (yellow card) 31'; Sagna 40'; Arteta (yellow card) 42'; Van Persie 43', (yellow card) 79'; Rosický 51'; Walcott 65', 68' | Report | 4' Saha; (yellow card) 29' Modrić; (yellow card) 30' (yellow-red card) 87' Parker; 34' (pen.) Adebayor; (yellow card) 61' Sandro | Stadium: Emirates Stadium; Attendance: 60,106; Referee: Mike Dean |

| 4 March 2012 27 | Tottenham Hotspur | 1–3 | Manchester United | London |
| 16:10 BST (UTC+1) | Defoe 87' | Report | Rooney 45'; Young 60', 69' | Stadium: White Hart Lane; Attendance: 36,034; Referee: Martin Atkinson |

| 10 March 2012 28 | Everton | 1–0 | Tottenham Hotspur | Liverpool |
| 17:30 GMT | Jelavić 22'; Heitinga (yellow card) 80'; Howard (yellow card) 90+5' | Report | Assou-Ekotto (yellow card) 60'; Defoe (yellow card) 61' | Stadium: Goodison Park; Attendance: 34,992; Referee: Mark Halsey |

| 21 March 2012 29 | Tottenham Hotspur | 1–1 | Stoke City | London |
| 20:00 GMT | van der Vaart (yellow card) 81', (goal) 90+3' | Report | Palacios (yellow card) 44'; Jerome 75' | Stadium: White Hart Lane; Attendance: 35,172; Referee: Mike Jones |

| 24 March 2012 30 | Chelsea | 0–0 | Tottenham Hotspur | London |
| 12:30 GMT | Essien (yellow card) 50' | Report | Assou-Ekotto (yellow card) 65'; Sandro (yellow card) 66' | Stadium: Stamford Bridge; Attendance: 41,830; Referee: Martin Atkinson |

| 1 April 2012 31 | Tottenham Hotspur | 3–1 | Swansea City | London |
| 16:00 GMT | van der Vaart 19'; Adebayor 73', 86' | Report | Sigurðsson 59' | Stadium: White Hart Lane; Attendance: 36,174; Referee: Andre Marriner |

| 7 April 2012 32 | Sunderland | 0–0 | Tottenham Hotspur | Sunderland |
| 12:45 GMT | Larsson (yellow card) 87'; Vaughan (yellow card) 90+3' | Report | Sandro (yellow card) 62'; Assou-Ekotto (yellow card) 89' | Stadium: Stadium of Light; Attendance: 39,335; Referee: Chris Foy |

| 9 April 2012 33 | Tottenham Hotspur | 1–2 | Norwich City | London |
| 15:00 GMT | Defoe 33' | Report | Pilkington 13'; E. Bennett 66' | Stadium: White Hart Lane; Attendance: 36,126; Referee: Michael Oliver |

| 21 April 2012 34 | Queens Park Rangers | 1–0 | Tottenham Hotspur | London |
| 17:30 GMT | Zamora (yellow card) 22'; Taarabt 24', (yellow card) 42', (yellow card) 77' (yellow-red card); Onuoha (yellow card) 75'; Hill (yellow card) 79' | Report | | Stadium: Loftus Road; Attendance: 18,021; Referee: Mark Clattenburg |

| 29 April 2012 35 | Tottenham Hotspur | 2–0 | Blackburn Rovers | London |
| 16:00 GMT | van der Vaart 22'; Walker 75' | Report | | Stadium: White Hart Lane; Attendance: 35,798; Referee: Mike Jones |

| 2 May 2012 36 | Bolton Wanderers | 1–4 | Tottenham Hotspur | Bolton |
| 20:00 GMT | Reo-Coker 51' | Report | Modrić 37'; Van der Vaart 60'; Adebayor 62', 69' | Stadium: Reebok Stadium; Attendance: 22,349; Referee: Mike Dean |

| 6 May 2012 37 | Aston Villa | 1–1 | Tottenham Hotspur | Birmingham |
| 15:00 GMT | Clark 35' | Report | Rose (red card) 50'; Adebayor 63' (pen.) | Stadium: Villa Park; Attendance: 36,008; Referee: Lee Probert |

| 13 May 2012 38 | Tottenham Hotspur | 2–0 | Fulham | London |
| 15:00 GMT | Adebayor 2'; Defoe 63' | Report | | Stadium: White Hart Lane; Attendance: 36,256; Referee: Phil Dowd |

^{1} Goal originally awarded to Gareth Bale but subsequently ruled a Chris Baird own goal by the Premier League's Dubious Goals Committee.

==== Results by matchday ====
| Match | 1 | 2 | 3 | 4 | 5 | 6 | 7 | 8 | 9 | 10 | 11 | 12 | 13 | 14 | 15 | 16 | 17 | 18 | 19 | 20 | 21 | 22 | 23 | 24 | 25 | 26 | 27 | 28 | 29 | 30 | 31 | 32 | 33 | 34 | 35 | 36 | 37 | 38 |
|---|---|---|---|---|---|---|---|---|---|---|---|---|---|---|---|---|---|---|---|---|---|---|---|---|---|---|---|---|---|---|---|---|---|---|---|---|---|---|
| Ground | A | H | A | H | A | H | A | A | H | A | H | A | H | A | H | H | A | A | H | H | H | A | H | A | H | A | H | A | H | A | H | A | H | A | H | A | A | H |
| Result | L | L | W | W | W | W | D | W | W | W | W | W | W | L | W | D | W | D | W | W | D | L | W | D | W | L | L | L | D | D | W | D | L | L | W | W | D | W |
| Position | 20 | 20 | 15 | 11 | 6 | 6 | 6 | 5 | 5 | 5 | 3 | 3 | 3 | 4 | 3 | 3 | 3 | 3 | 3 | 3 | 3 | 3 | 3 | 3 | 3 | 3 | 3 | 3 | 4 | 4 | 4 | 4 | 4 | 5 | 4 | 4 | 4 | 4 |

A = Away; H = Home; W = Win; D = Draw; L = Loss

=== FA Cup ===
| Round | Date | Opponents | H / A | Result | Scorers | Attendance |
|---|---|---|---|---|---|---|
| Third round | 7 January 2012 | Cheltenham | H | 3 – 0 | Defoe 24', Pavlyuchenko 43', Dos Santos 87' | 35,672 |
| Fourth round | 27 January 2012 | Watford | A | 0 – 1 | Van der Vaart 42' | 15,384 |
| Fifth round | 19 February 2012 | Stevenage | A | 0 – 0 | – | 6,332 |
| Fifth round Replay | 7 March 2012 | Stevenage | H | 3 – 1 | Defoe 26', 75', Adebayor 55' (pen.) | 35,757 |
Quarter-finals
| Quarter-finals | 17 March 2012 | Bolton Wanderers | H | 1 – 1 (41')^{1} | Walker 11' | – |
| Quarter-finals | 27 March 2012 | Bolton Wanderers | H | 3 – 1 | Nelsen 74', Bale 77', Saha 90+4' | 30,718 |
| Semi-finals | 15 April 2012 | Chelsea | N | 1 – 5 | Bale 56' | 85,731 |

^{1} Fabrice Muamba collapsed after 41 minutes, with the score at 1–1, after which referee Howard Webb abandoned the game. It was later revealed to be a cardiac arrest.

Win Draw Loss Postponed Abandoned

=== League Cup ===
| Round | Date | Opponents | H / A | Result | Scorers | Attendance |
|---|---|---|---|---|---|---|
| Third round | 20 September 2011 | Stoke City | A | 0 - 0 (7 - 6 pen) | – | 15,023 |

=== Europa League ===
==== Play-off round ====
| Leg | Date | Opponents | H / A | Result | Scorers | Attendance |
|---|---|---|---|---|---|---|
| 1st Leg | 18 August 2011 | Heart of Midlothian | A | 0 - 5 | Van der Vaart 5', Defoe 13', Livermore 28', Bale 63', Lennon 78', | 16,279 |
| 2nd Leg | 25 August 2011 | Heart of Midlothian | H | 0 - 0 | | 32,590 |

Tottenham Hotspur win 5–0 on aggregate.

==== Group stage ====
| Date | Opponents | H / A | Result (H/A) | Scorers | Attendance |
|---|---|---|---|---|---|
| 15 September 2011 | PAOK | A | 0 – 0 | – | 24,645 |
| 29 September 2011 | Shamrock Rovers | H | 3 – 1 | Pavlyuchenko 60', Defoe 61', Dos Santos 65' | 24,782 |
| 20 October 2011 | Rubin Kazan | H | 1 – 0 | Pavlyuchenko 33' | 24,058 |
| 3 November 2011 | Rubin Kazan | A | 1 – 0 | – | 21,250 |
| 30 November 2011 | PAOK | H | 1 – 2 | Modrić 38' (pen.) | 26,229 |
| 15 December 2011 | Shamrock Rovers | A | 0 – 4 | Pienaar 29', Townsend 38', Defoe 45', Kane 90' | 7,500 |

| Pos | Team | Pld | W | D | L | GF | GA | GD | Pts | Qualification | PAOK | RK | TH | SR |
|---|---|---|---|---|---|---|---|---|---|---|---|---|---|---|
| 1 | (Greece) PAOK | 6 | 3 | 3 | 0 | 10 | 6 | +4 | 12 | Advance to knockout phase | — | 1–1 | 0–0 | 2–1 |
| 2 | (Russia) Rubin Kazan | 6 | 3 | 2 | 1 | 11 | 5 | +6 | 11 | Advance to knockout phase | 2–2 | — | 1–0 | 4–1 |
| 3 | (England) Tottenham Hotspur | 6 | 3 | 1 | 2 | 9 | 4 | +5 | 10 | | 1–2 | 1–0 | — | 3–1 |
| 4 | (Republic of Ireland) Shamrock Rovers | 6 | 0 | 0 | 6 | 4 | 19 | −15 | 0 | | 1–3 | 0–3 | 0–4 | — |

Source: Soccerway

== Statistics ==
=== Appearances ===
Last updated: 26 July 2020.
Source: premierleague.com

| No. | Pos. | Name | Premier League | | FA Cup | | League Cup | | Europa League | | Total | |
| No. | Pos. | Name | Apps | Goals | Apps | Goals | Apps | Goals | Apps | Goals | Apps | Goals |
Goalkeepers
| 1 | GK | (Brazil) Heurelho Gomes | 0 | 0 | 0 | 0 | 1 | 0 | 3 | 0 | 4 | 0 |
| 23 | GK | (Italy) Carlo Cudicini | 0 | 0 | 6 | 0 | 0 | 0 | 5 | 0 | 11 | 0 |
| 24 | GK | (United States) Brad Friedel | 38 | 0 | 0 | 0 | 0 | 0 | 0 | 0 | 38 | 0 |
Defenders
| 4 | DF | (France) Younes Kaboul | 33 | 1 | 3 | 0 | 1 | 0 | 2+2 | 0 | 39+2 | 1 |
| 13 | DF | (France) William Gallas | 15 | 0 | 1 | 0 | 0 | 0 | 2 | 0 | 18 | 0 |
| 19 | DF | (Cameroon) Sebastien Bassong | 1+4 | 0 | 1 | 0 | 1 | 0 | 6 | 0 | 9+4 | 0 |
| 20 | DF | (England) Michael Dawson | 6+1 | 0 | 4 | 0 | 0 | 0 | 2 | 0 | 12+1 | 0 |
| 22 | DF | (Croatia) Vedran Corluka | 1+2 | 0 | 0 | 0 | 1 | 0 | 4 | 0 | 6+2 | 0 |
| 25 | DF | (England) Danny Rose | 3+8 | 0 | 4+1 | 0 | 0 | 0 | 4 | 0 | 11+9 | 0 |
| 26 | DF | (England) Ledley King | 21 | 0 | 2 | 0 | 0 | 0 | 0 | 0 | 23 | 0 |
| 28 | DF | (England) Kyle Walker | 37 | 2 | 4+1 | 0 | 0 | 0 | 4+1 | 0 | 45+2 | 2 |
| 32 | DF | (Cameroon) Benoît Assou-Ekotto | 34 | 2 | 2 | 0 | 1 | 0 | 2+1 | 0 | 39+1 | 2 |
| 33 | DF | (New Zealand) Ryan Nelsen | 0+5 | 0 | 3 | 1 | 0 | 0 | 0 | 0 | 3+5 | 1 |
| 43 | DF | (England) Ryan Fredericks | 0 | 0 | 0 | 0 | 0 | 0 | 2+1 | 0 | 2+1 | 0 |
| 51 | DF | (England) Adam Smith | 0+1 | 0 | 0 | 0 | 0 | 0 | 0 | 0 | 0+1 | 0 |
Midfielders
| 3 | MF | (Wales) Gareth Bale | 36 | 9 | 4 | 2 | 0 | 0 | 1+1 | 1 | 41+1 | 12 |
| 6 | MF | (England) Tom Huddlestone | 0+2 | 0 | 0 | 0 | 0 | 0 | 1+1 | 0 | 1+3 | 0 |
| 7 | MF | (England) Aaron Lennon | 19+4 | 3 | 3+2 | 0 | 0 | 0 | 4 | 1 | 26+6 | 4 |
| 8 | MF | (England) Scott Parker | 28+1 | 0 | 5 | 0 | 0 | 0 | 0 | 0 | 33+1 | 0 |
| 11 | MF | (Netherlands) Rafael van der Vaart | 28+5 | 11 | 4 | 1 | 1 | 0 | 1 | 1 | 34+5 | 13 |
| 14 | MF | (Croatia) Luka Modrić | 36 | 4 | 3 | 0 | 0 | 0 | 1+1 | 1 | 40+1 | 5 |
| 21 | MF | (Croatia) Niko Kranjčar | 9+3 | 1 | 2+1 | 0 | 0 | 0 | 2+1 | 0 | 13+5 | 1 |
| 29 | MF | (England) Jake Livermore | 7+17 | 0 | 4+1 | 0 | 1 | 0 | 8 | 1 | 20+18 | 1 |
| 30 | MF | (Brazil) Sandro | 17+6 | 0 | 0+1 | 0 | 1 | 0 | 2 | 0 | 20+7 | 0 |
| 31 | MF | (England) Andros Townsend | 0 | 0 | 0 | 0 | 0+1 | 0 | 4+2 | 1 | 4+3 | 1 |
| 34 | MF | (Spain) Iago Falque | 0 | 0 | 0+1 | 0 | 0 | 0 | 2+3 | 0 | 2+4 | 0 |
| 40 | MF | (South Africa) Steven Pienaar | 0+2 | 0 | 1+1 | 0 | 0 | 0 | 3 | 1 | 4+3 | 1 |
| 41 | MF | (England) John Bostock | 0 | 0 | 0+1 | 0 | 0 | 0 | 0 | 0 | 0+1 | 0 |
| 45 | MF | (Australia) Massimo Luongo | 0 | 0 | 0 | 0 | 0+1 | 0 | 0 | 0 | 0+1 | 0 |
| 46 | MF | (England) Tom Carroll | 0 | 0 | 0+1 | 0 | 1 | 0 | 5 | 0 | 6+1 | 0 |
| 46 | MF | (England) Jake Nicholson | 0 | 0 | 0 | 0 | 0 | 0 | 0+1 | 0 | 0+1 | 0 |
| 58 | MF | (England) Dean Parrett | 0 | 0 | 0 | 0 | 0 | 0 | 0+2 | 0 | 0+2 | 0 |
Forwards
| 10 | FW | (Togo) Emmanuel Adebayor | 32+1 | 17 | 3+1 | 1 | 0 | 0 | 0 | 0 | 35+2 | 18 |
| 15 | FW | (France) Louis Saha | 5+5 | 3 | 1+1 | 1 | 0 | 0 | 0 | 0 | 6+6 | 4 |
| 17 | FW | (Mexico) Giovani dos Santos | 0+7 | 0 | 1 | 1 | 1 | 0 | 4 | 1 | 6+7 | 2 |
| 18 | FW | (England) Jermain Defoe | 11+14 | 11 | 4+2 | 3 | 0+1 | 0 | 6 | 3 | 21+17 | 17 |
| 37 | FW | (England) Harry Kane | 0 | 0 | 0 | 0 | 0 | 0 | 3+3 | 1 | 3+3 | 1 |
| 53 | FW | (England) Cameron Lancaster | 0+1 | 0 | 0 | 0 | 0 | 0 | 0 | 0 | 0+1 | 0 |
Players transferred out during the season
| 9 | FW | (Russia) Roman Pavlyuchenko | 0+5 | 1 | 1+1 | 1 | 1 | 0 | 5+1 | 2 | 7+7 | 4 |
| 15 | FW | (England) Peter Crouch | 1 | 0 | 0 | 0 | 0 | 0 | 0 | 0 | 1 | 0 |

=== Goal scorers ===
Last updated: 26 July 2020.
Source: premierleague.com

The list is sorted by shirt number when total goals are equal.

| Rnk | Pos | No. | Player | Premier League | FA Cup | League Cup | Europa League | Total |
|---|---|---|---|---|---|---|---|---|
| 1 | FW | 10 | (Togo) Emmanuel Adebayor | 17 | 1 | 0 | 0 | 18 |
| 2 | FW | 18 | (England) Jermain Defoe | 11 | 3 | 0 | 3 | 17 |
| 3 | MF | 3 | (Wales) Gareth Bale | 10 | 2 | 0 | 1 | 13 |
| 3 | MF | 11 | (Netherlands) Rafael van der Vaart | 11 | 1 | 0 | 1 | 13 |
| 5 | MF | 14 | (Croatia) Luka Modrić | 4 | 0 | 0 | 1 | 5 |
| 6 | MF | 7 | (England) Aaron Lennon | 3 | 0 | 0 | 1 | 4 |
| 6 | FW | 9 | (Russia) Roman Pavlyuchenko | 1 | 1 | 0 | 2 | 4 |
| 6 | FW | 15 | (France) Louis Saha | 3 | 1 | 0 | 0 | 4 |
| 9 | FW | 17 | (Mexico) Giovani dos Santos | 0 | 1 | 0 | 1 | 2 |
| 9 | DF | 28 | (England) Kyle Walker | 2 | 0 | 0 | 0 | 2 |
| 9 | DF | 32 | (Cameroon) Benoît Assou-Ekotto | 2 | 0 | 0 | 0 | 2 |
| 12 | DF | 4 | (France) Younes Kaboul | 1 | 0 | 0 | 0 | 1 |
| 12 | MF | 21 | (Croatia) Niko Kranjčar | 1 | 0 | 0 | 0 | 1 |
| 12 | MF | 29 | (England) Jake Livermore | 0 | 0 | 0 | 1 | 1 |
| 12 | MF | 31 | (England) Andros Townsend | 0 | 0 | 0 | 1 | 1 |
| 12 | DF | 33 | (New Zealand) Ryan Nelsen | 0 | 1 | 0 | 0 | 1 |
| 12 | FW | 37 | (England) Harry Kane | 0 | 0 | 0 | 1 | 1 |
| 12 | MF | 40 | (South Africa) Steven Pienaar | 0 | 0 | 0 | 1 | 1 |
| TOTALS | | | | 66 | 11 | 0 | 14 | 91 |

=== Clean sheets ===
Last updated: 26 July 2020.
Source: premierleague.com

The list is sorted by shirt number when total clean sheets are equal.

| Rnk | No. | Player | Premier League | FA Cup | League Cup | Europa League | Total |
|---|---|---|---|---|---|---|---|
| 1 | 24 | (United States) Brad Friedel | 14 | 0 | 0 | 0 | 14 |
| 2 | 23 | (Italy) Carlo Cudicini | 0 | 3 | 0 | 3 | 6 |
| 3 | 1 | (Brazil) Heurelho Gomes | 0 | 0 | 1 | 2 | 3 |
| TOTALS | | | 14 | 3 | 1 | 5 | 23 |
