= Levi Ives (footballer) =

Northern Irish footballer (born 1997)

Personal information
- Date of birth: 28 July 1997 (age 29)
- Place of birth: Belfast, Northern Ireland
- Height: 1.73 m (5 ft 8 in)
- Position: Left-back

Team information
- Current team: Coleraine
- Number: 15

Youth career
- Torquay United

Senior career*
Years	Team	Apps	(Gls)
2014–2015	Torquay United	20	(0)
2015–2023	Cliftonville	195	(14)
2023–2025	Larne	37	(4)
2025–	Coleraine	49	(1)

International career^{‡}
2013	Northern Ireland U16	2	(0)
2014–2015	Northern Ireland U19	7	(2)
- * Club domestic league appearances and goals as of 29 April 2026 ‡ National team caps and goals as of 17 February 2023

Levi Ives (born 28 July 1997) is a Northern Irish footballer who plays as a left-back for Coleraine in NIFL Premiership.

== Club career ==
Ives began his career at Torquay United. He made 20 appearances in his first season, attracting attention from Premier League and EFL Championship teams. Ives left Torquay United in 2015.

In 2015, Ives joined Cliftonville. On 17 October 2015, Ives made his debut against Portadown. He helped Cliftonville win the 2015–16 Northern Ireland Football League Cup and 2021–22 Northern Ireland Football League Cup.

== Career statistics ==
=== Club ===
As of match played 4 December 2024

Appearances and goals by club, season and competition
Club	Season	League			National cup (Note: Includes FA Cup, Irish Cup)		League Cup (Note: Includes EFL Cup, NIFL Cup)		Continental		Other		Total	
Club	Season	Division	Apps	Goals	Apps	Goals	Apps	Goals	Apps	Goals	Apps	Goals	Apps	Goals
Torquay United	2014-15	Football Conference	20	0	0	0	—		—		4 (Note: Appearance(s) in FA Trophy)	0	24	0
Cliftonville	2015-16	NIFL Premiership	26	0	2	0	3	0	—		0	0	31	0
Cliftonville	2016-17	NIFL Premiership	35	4	0	0	1	0	4 (Note: Appearance(s) in UEFA Europa League)	0	1 (Note: Appearance(s) in NIFL Premiership UEFA Europa League play-offs)	0	41	4
Cliftonville	2017-18	NIFL Premiership	33	1	3	0	3	0	—		2	0	41	1
Cliftonville	2018-19	NIFL Premiership	30	3	0	0	2	2	2	0	2	1	36	6
Cliftonville	2019-20	NIFL Premiership	12	0	1	0	0	0	4	0	—		17	0
Cliftonville	2020-21	NIFL Premiership	4	0	0	0	0	0	—		2	0	6	0
Cliftonville	2021-22	NIFL Premiership	34	4	3	0	3	0	—		—		40	4
Cliftonville	2022-23	NIFL Premiership	12	1	2	0	1	0	2 (Note: Appearance(s) in UEFA Europa Conference League)	0	2 (Note: Appearance(s) in NIFL Premiership UEFA Europa Conference League play-offs)	0	19	1
Cliftonville	Total		186	13	11	0	13	2	12	0	9	1	231	16
Larne	2023-24	NIFL Premiership	28	3	4	1	2	0	2	0	—		36	4
Larne	2024-25	NIFL Premiership	14	1	0	0	2	0	9 (Note: Two appearances in UEFA Champions League, Seven appearances in UEFA Europa Conference League)	0	1 (Note: Appearance(s) in NIFL Charity Shield)	0	24	0
Larne	Total		42	4	4	1	4	0	11	0	1	0	60	4
Career total			248	17	15	1	17	2	23	0	14	1	317	21

== Honours ==
Cliftonville

- Irish League Cup: 2015-16, 2021-22
- County Antrim Shield: 2019-20
