= John Tennent (footballer) =

Scottish footballer

Personal information
- Date of birth: 27 August 1997 (age 29)
- Place of birth: Paisley, Scotland
- Position: Defender

Team information
- Current team: Largs Thistle

Youth career
- Greenock Morton

Senior career*
Years	Team	Apps	(Gls)
2015–2017	Greenock Morton	1	(0)
2016	→ Cumbernauld Colts (loan)	?	(?)
2017–	Largs Thistle	7	(1)
- * Club domestic league appearances and goals as of 14:23, 25 April 2017 (UTC)

John Tennent (born 27 August 1997) is a Scottish professional footballer who plays as a right-sided defender. After leaving Morton he signed with Junior side Largs Thistle. On 7 July 2024 he signed for Kilbirnie Ladeside and is now a Blastie.

He also played for Lowland League side Cumbernauld Colts, on loan from Greenock Morton.

== Club career ==
Tennent turned professional when he signed a full-time contract in May 2014 with Greenock Morton in the Scottish League One as part of their new development squad.

He made his début for the club as an injury time substitute at Ibrox Stadium in March 2016.

Tennent agreed a new deal in May 2016 to keep him at the club for at least six more months.

On the final day of the summer transfer window, Tennent went on loan to Lowland Football League side Cumbernauld Colts. He was recalled in November from his loan spell.

Once the expiration of his short-term deal with Morton, he was released in Tennent signed with Ayrshire junior side Largs Thistle.

== Honours ==
Morton

- SPFL Development League West: Winners 2015–16
