= Jamie McDonagh =

Northern Irish footballer

Personal information
- Full name: Jamie Dean Cantona McDonagh
- Date of birth: 8 May 1996 (age 30)
- Place of birth: Lisburn, Northern Ireland
- Positions: Winger; forward

Team information
- Current team: Lisburn Rangers

Youth career
- Portadown
- Linfield
- Sheffield United

Senior career*
Years	Team	Apps	(Gls)
2014–2016	Sheffield United	0	(0)
2014–2015	→ Matlock Town (loan)	15	(6)
2015	→ Chester (loan)	1	(0)
2016	→ Alfreton Town (loan)	2	(0)
2016–2017	Greenock Morton	25	(1)
2017–2018	Sligo Rovers	7	(0)
2018–2020	Derry City	63	(5)
2020–2021	Glentoran	20	(1)
2021–2024	Cliftonville	58	(6)
2023	→ Glenavon (loan)	6	(0)
2024	→ Newry City (loan)	4	(0)
2024–2025	Portadown	4	(0)
2025	→ Bangor (loan)	5	(0)
2025-2026	Oxford Sunnyside	8	(1)
2025-2026	Lisburn Distillery	17	(5)
2026	Knockbreda	1	(0)
2026-	Lisburn Rangers	3	(0)

International career^{‡}
2012–2013	Northern Ireland U17	5	(4)
2014	Northern Ireland U19	3	(1)
2015–2018	Northern Ireland U21	10	(0)
- * Club domestic league appearances and goals as of 20:08, 28 April 2024 (UTC) ‡ National team caps and goals as of 16 October 2018

Jamie McDonagh (born 8 May 1996) is a Northern Irish semi-professional footballer who plays as a winger or forward for Lisburn Rangers F.C.

== Career ==
=== Greenock Morton ===
Jamie McDonagh signed for Greenock Morton in the summer of 2016 as a forward. Though throughout the 2016–17 campaign, McDonagh featured as a right midfielder and right back, due to injuries to Conor Pepper and Michael Doyle. McDonagh left Morton in May 2017 at the expiration of his contract.

After a short spell at Sligo Rovers, McDonagh joined Derry City in December 2017.

=== Glentoran ===
On 1 August 2020, Jamie signed for Irish Premiership side, Glentoran.

== Honours ==
Alfreton Town

- Derbyshire Senior Cup: 2015-16

Derry City

- EA Sports Cup: 2018

Cliftonville

- Irish League Cup: 2021-22
