= Jamie McGowan (footballer, born 1997) =

Scottish footballer

Personal information
- Date of birth: 29 January 1997 (age 29)
- Place of birth: Paisley, Scotland
- Position: Goalkeeper

Team information
- Current team: Kilbirnie Ladeside

Youth career
- St Mirren
- Greenock Morton

Senior career*
Years	Team	Apps	(Gls)
2014–2018	Greenock Morton	3	(0)
2016	→ Cumbernauld United (loan)	15	(0)
2016	→ Cumbernauld United (loan)	6	(0)
2017–2018	→ Troon (loan)	?	(?)
2018–2019	Dumbarton	4	(0)
2019–2023	Largs Thistle		
2023	Johnstone Burgh		
2023-	Kilbirnie Ladeside		
- * Club domestic league appearances and goals as of 21:40, 28 December 2023 (UTC)

James McGowan (born 29 January 1997) is a Scottish professional footballer, who plays as a goalkeeper for West of Scotland Premier Division side Johnstone Burgh.

He previously played for Greenock Morton and Dumbarton and spent loan spells at Junior clubs Cumbernauld United and Troon.

Scotland youth internationalist

== Career ==
McGowan started his career as a youth player at St Mirren before moving to local rivals Greenock Morton as part of their development squad. He made his debut as a substitute in November 2014, after Derek Gaston was injured against Stenhousemuir. He made his first start in the Scottish Cup in a defeat to Spartans, before making his first league start in February 2016 after Gaston suffered a concussion in the previous match.

McGowan agreed a new one-year deal for the 2016–17 season. He spent time on loan at Cumbernauld United, either side of the summer in 2016.

In May 2017, he again signed up for a further year at Morton. He was then loaned to Troon in August 2017.

Although his contract expired at the end of the 2017–18 season, new manager Ray McKinnon invited him in for pre-season training to assess him however he declined the offer to sign for Scottish League One side Dumbarton. After making just five appearances for the club, he was released in January 2019 and signed for SJFA West Region Premiership side Largs Thistle.

== Personal life ==
As well as playing semi-professionally for Largs Thistle, McGowan also runs his own one-to-one goalkeeping school in Paisley that he launched in 2019.

== Honours ==
Morton

- SPFL Development League West: Winners (2) 2015–16, 2017–18

== See also ==
- Greenock Morton F.C. season 2015–16
