= Conor Pepper =

Irish footballer

Personal information
- Date of birth: 4 May 1994 (age 32)
- Place of birth: Dublin, Ireland
- Positions: Midfielder; defender

Youth career
- Portmarnock
- Cherry Orchard
- 2011–2012: St Patrick's Athletic

Senior career*
| Years | Team | Apps | (Gls) |
| 2012 | St Patrick's Athletic | 0 | (0) |
| 2012–2014 | Inverness Caledonian Thistle | 12 | (2) |
| 2014–2017 | Greenock Morton | 47 | (2) |
| 2018–2020 | Glentoran | 57 | (0) |
| 2020–2023 | Linfield | 34 | (0) |
| 2023–2026 | Cliftonville | 68 | (0) |

International career
| 2012–2013 | Republic of Ireland U19 | | |
- * Club domestic league appearances and goals as of 21:03, 7 September 2026 (UTC)

Conor Pepper (born 4 May 1994) is an Irish professional association football coach and former player, who played as a midfielder or full-back.

== Career ==
Born in Dublin, Pepper played youth football with Portmarnock AFC and Cherry Orchard. He played for St. Patrick's Athletic Under 19s and also made one first team appearance in the Leinster Senior Cup in a Dublin derby away to Shamrock Rovers, before signing for Scottish Premier League club Inverness Caledonian Thistle in July 2012.

He made his first competitive appearance for Inverness on 18 August 2012. During this appearance he scored a late equalising goal in a 2–2 draw against Hearts at Tynecastle. He made an assist in his second match, a 4–2 loss against Celtic. Then scored his second goal for the club in his first start away at Hibernian.

Pepper has represented the Republic of Ireland at youth international levels.

Despite a promising first campaign with Inverness with Terry Butcher, Pepper failed to feature during his second season and was subsequently released by the club in May 2014 by manager John Hughes.

However, Pepper stayed in Scottish football by signing for Greenock Morton. He agreed a new deal with Morton in May 2016. Pepper was part of the team that won the Scottish league One title in his first season at Greenock Morton. Pepper featured in every game up of his second campaign until February 2016 when suffered a knee injury and didn't feature again for the first-team. After 3 seasons with Morton, Pepper left the club in May 2017 at the end of his contract.

After spending 2 years without playing first-team football, still recovering from injury, Pepper moved to Belfast to sign for NIFL Premiership side Glentoran. In his first month as a Glentoran player, Pepper won the Glentoran Supporters Player of the Month Award for August 2018 with 85% of the vote. Pepper was praised by his manager Mick McDermott, who said "I have said it before, and I will say it again, that we have the best two full-backs in the league" After two seasons with Glentoran, Pepper signed for Big Two rivals Linfield. He then spent 3 seasons with Linfield's rivals Cliftonville before retiring from professional football in the summer of 2026, transitioning into the role of first team coach under manager Jim Magilton.

== Career statistics ==
As of match played 11 April 2026

| Club | Season | League | | | National Cup | | League Cup | | Europe | | Other | | Total | |
| Club | Season | Division | Apps | Goals | Apps | Goals | Apps | Goals | Apps | Goals | Apps | Goals | Apps | Goals |
|---|---|---|---|---|---|---|---|---|---|---|---|---|---|---|
| St Patrick's Athletic | 2012 | LOI Premier Division | 0 | 0 | 0 | 0 | 0 | 0 | 0 (Note: Appearances in UEFA Europa League) | 0 | 1 (Note: Appearances in Leinster Senior Cup) | 0 | 1 | 0 |
| Inverness Caledonian Thistle | 2012–13 | Scottish Premiership | 12 | 2 | 0 | 0 | 3 | 0 | — | | — | | 15 | 2 |
| Inverness Caledonian Thistle | 2013–14 | Scottish Premiership | 0 | 0 | 0 | 0 | 0 | 0 | — | | — | | 0 | 0 |
| Inverness Caledonian Thistle | Total | | 12 | 2 | 0 | 0 | 3 | 0 | — | | — | | 15 | 2 |
| Greenock Morton | 2014–15 | Scottish League One | 25 | 2 | 2 | 0 | 2 | 0 | — | | 2 (Note: Appearances in Scottish Challenge Cup) | 0 | 31 | 2 |
| Greenock Morton | 2015–16 | Scottish Championship | 22 | 0 | 3 | 0 | 4 | 0 | — | | 1 | 0 | 30 | 0 |
| Greenock Morton | 2016–17 | Scottish Championship | 0 | 0 | 0 | 0 | 0 | 0 | — | | 0 | 0 | 0 | 0 |
| Greenock Morton | Total | | 47 | 2 | 5 | 0 | 6 | 0 | — | | 3 | 0 | 61 | 2 |
| Glentoran | 2018–19 | NIFL Premiership | 34 | 0 | 0 | 0 | 2 | 0 | — | | — | | 36 | 0 |
| Glentoran | 2019–20 | NIFL Premiership | 23 | 0 | 1 | 0 | 1 | 0 | — | | — | | 25 | 0 |
| Glentoran | Total | | 57 | 0 | 1 | 0 | 3 | 0 | — | | — | | 61 | 0 |
| Linfield | 2020–21 | NIFL Premiership | 17 | 0 | 5 | 0 | — | | 1 (Note: Appearances in UEFA Champions League) | 0 | 1 (Note: Appearances in County Antrim Shield) | 0 | 24 | 0 |
| Linfield | 2021–22 | NIFL Premiership | 7 | 0 | 0 | 0 | 0 | 0 | 2 (Note: 1 appearance in UEFA Champions League & 1 appearance in UEFA Europa Conference League) | 0 | 0 | 0 | 9 | 0 |
| Linfield | 2022–23 | NIFL Premiership | 10 | 0 | 2 | 0 | 2 | 0 | 2 (Note: 1 appearance in UEFA Champions League & 1 appearance in UEFA Europa League) | 0 | 5 (Note: 3 appearances in County Antrim Shield, 1 appearance in NIFL Charity Shield & 1 appearance in Scottish Challenge Cup) | 0 | 21 | 0 |
| Linfield | Total | | 34 | 0 | 7 | 0 | 2 | 0 | 5 | 0 | 6 | 0 | 54 | 0 |
| Cliftonville | 2023–24 | NIFL Premiership | 23 | 0 | 2 | 0 | 1 | 0 | — | | 2 (Note: 1 appearance in County Antrim Shield & 1 appearance in Scottish Challenge Cup) | 0 | 28 | 0 |
| Cliftonville | 2024–25 | NIFL Premiership | 25 | 0 | 1 | 0 | 2 | 0 | 2 (Note: Appearances in UEFA Conference League) | 0 | 3 (Note: 1 appearance in NIFL Charity Shield; 2 appearances in 2025 NIFL Premiership European Playoffs) | 0 | 33 | 0 |
| Cliftonville | 2025–26 | NIFL Premiership | 20 | 0 | 3 | 0 | 2 | 0 | 2 | 0 | 3 | 0 | 30 | 0 |
| Cliftonville | Total | | 68 | 0 | 6 | 0 | 5 | 0 | 4 | 0 | 8 | 0 | 91 | 0 |
| Career Total | | 218 | 4 | 19 | 0 | 19 | 0 | 9 | 0 | 18 | 0 | 283 | 4 | |

== Honours ==
Morton

- Scottish League One: 2014–15

Glentoran

- Irish Cup: 2019–20

Linfield

- NIFL Premiership: 2020-21
- Irish Cup: 2020-21

Cliftonville

- Irish Cup: 2023-24
- Northern Ireland Football League Cup: 2024–25
